= 2011 Women's European Volleyball Championship squads =

This article shows all participating team squads at the 2011 Women's European Volleyball Championship, held in Italy and Serbia from 23 September to 3 October 2011.

== Pool A ==
=== France ===
- Head Coach: Fabrice Vial

№	Name	Date of birth	Height	Weight	2011 club
1	Pauline Soullard	24 April 1985	183 cm (6 ft 0 in)	66 cm (2 ft 2 in)	(France) Béziers Volley
2	Véronika Hudima	8 July 1988	185 cm (6 ft 1 in)	72 cm (2 ft 4 in)	(Poland) TPS Rumia
3	Taiana Tere	27 May 1986	178 cm (5 ft 10 in)		(France) Évreux Volley-ball
4	Christina Bauer	1 January 1989	196 cm (6 ft 5 in)	76 cm (2 ft 6 in)	(Italy) FV Busto Arsizio
5	Marielle Bousquet	5 April 1985	168 cm (5 ft 6 in)	60 cm (2 ft 0 in)	(France) SF Paris Saint Cloud
7	Jelena Lozančić	26 March 1983	186 cm (6 ft 1 in)		(France) RC Cannes
9	Anna Rybaczewski	23 March 1982	186 cm (6 ft 1 in)	75 cm (2 ft 6 in)	(France) ASPTT Mulhouse
10	Maëva Orlé	8 May 1991	184 cm (6 ft 0 in)	60 cm (2 ft 0 in)	(France) ES Le Cannet
11	Armelle Faesch	26 December 1981	183 cm (6 ft 0 in)	67 cm (2 ft 2 in)	(France) ASPTT Mulhouse
14	Mallory Steux	24 October 1988	171 cm (5 ft 7 in)	62 cm (2 ft 0 in)	(France) Stella ES Calais
15	Gaëlle Mollinger	23 April 1988	18 cm (7 in)		(France) Évreux Volley-ball
16	Hélène Schleck	31 May 1986	181 cm (5 ft 11 in)	68 cm (2 ft 3 in)	(France) Évreux Volley-ball
17	Alexandra Dascalu	17 April 1991	184 cm (6 ft 0 in)		(France) Nantes Volley
18	Alexandra Rochelle	14 December 1983	173 cm (5 ft 8 in)	59 cm (1 ft 11 in)	(France) Évreux Volley-ball

=== Germany ===
- Head Coach: Giovanni Guidetti

№	Name	Date of birth	Height	Weight	2011 club
1	Lenka Dürr	10 December 1990	171 cm (5 ft 7 in)		(Germany) Raben Vilsbiburg
2	Kathleen Weiß	2 February 1984	171 cm (5 ft 7 in)		(Azerbaijan) Igtisadchi Baku
4	Kerstin Tzscherlich	15 February 1978	186 cm (6 ft 1 in)		(Germany) Dresdner SC
7	Angelina Grün	2 December 1979	179 cm (5 ft 10 in)		(Germany) Alemannia Aachen
8	Berit Kauffeldt	8 July 1990	185 cm (6 ft 1 in)		(Germany) Schweriner SC
9	Corina Ssuschke	5 May 1983	190 cm (6 ft 3 in)	75 cm (2 ft 6 in)	(Czech Republic) VK Prostějov
10	Anne Matthes	30 April 1985	189 cm (6 ft 2 in)		(Italy) Time Volley Matera
11	Christiane Fürst	29 March 1985	193 cm (6 ft 4 in)		(Turkey) Fenerbahçe SK
13	Saskia Hippe	16 January 1991	192 cm (6 ft 4 in)		(Germany) Dresdner SC
14	Margareta Kozuch	30 October 1986	187 cm (6 ft 2 in)		(Russia) Zarechie Odintsovo
15	Maren Brinker	10 July 1986	188 cm (6 ft 2 in)		(Germany) VC Stuttgart
16	Lisa Thomsen	20 August 1985	184 cm (6 ft 0 in)		(Germany) Schweriner SC
19	Regina Burchardt	1 July 1983	172 cm (5 ft 8 in)		(Germany) VC Wiesbaden
20	Mareen Apitz	26 March 1987	183 cm (6 ft 0 in)		(Germany) Dresdner SC

=== Serbia ===
- Head Coach: Zoran Terzić

№	Name	Date of birth	Height	Weight	2011 club
1	Ana Lazarević	4 July 1991	187 cm (6 ft 2 in)	77 cm (2 ft 6 in)	(Serbia) Vizura Belgrado
2	Jovana Brakočević	5 March 1988	196 cm (6 ft 5 in)	82 cm (2 ft 8 in)	(China) Guangdong Hengda
3	Sanja Malagurski	8 June 1990	193 cm (6 ft 4 in)	75 cm (2 ft 6 in)	(Serbia) OK Crvena Zvezda
5	Nataša Krsmanović	19 June 1985	188 cm (6 ft 2 in)	73 cm (2 ft 5 in)	(Azerbaijan) Rabita Baku
6	Tijana Malešević	18 March 1991	185 cm (6 ft 1 in)	78 cm (2 ft 7 in)	(Switzerland) Voléro Zürich
7	Brižitka Molnar	28 July 1985	182 cm (6 ft 0 in)	66 cm (2 ft 2 in)	(Greece) Panathinaikos
8	Ana Antonijević	26 August 1987	185 cm (6 ft 1 in)	71 cm (2 ft 4 in)	(France) RC Cannes
9	Jovana Vesović	21 June 1987	182 cm (6 ft 0 in)	68 cm (2 ft 3 in)	(Romania) Dinamo Bucarest
10	Maja Ognjenović	6 August 1984	183 cm (6 ft 0 in)	68 cm (2 ft 3 in)	(Greece) Olympiakos
12	Jelena Nikolić	13 April 1982	194 cm (6 ft 4 in)	79 cm (2 ft 7 in)	(Turkey) VakıfGüneş Istanbul
14	Nađa Ninković	1 November 1991	193 cm (6 ft 4 in)	77 cm (2 ft 6 in)	(Serbia) OK Crvena Zvezda
16	Milena Rašić	25 October 1990	193 cm (6 ft 4 in)	75 cm (2 ft 6 in)	(France) RC Cannes
18	Suzana Ćebić	9 November 1984	167 cm (5 ft 6 in)	60 cm (2 ft 0 in)	(Germany) VfB 91 Suhl
19	Silvija Popović	15 March 1986	175 cm (5 ft 9 in)	60 cm (2 ft 0 in)	(Azerbaijan) Rabita Baku

=== Ukraine ===
- Head Coach: Volodymyr Buzaiev

№	Name	Date of birth	Height	Weight	2011 club
1	Svitlana Halkina	9 February 1989	176 cm (5 ft 9 in)	65 cm (2 ft 2 in)	
2	Tetyana Litvinovska	5 December 1989	185 cm (6 ft 1 in)	70 cm (2 ft 4 in)	(Ukraine) Severodonchanka
3	Svitlana Lidyayeva	11 December 1993	185 cm (6 ft 1 in)	65 cm (2 ft 2 in)	(Ukraine) Severodonchanka
4	Maryna Marchenko	12 July 1985	187 cm (6 ft 2 in)	64 cm (2 ft 1 in)	(France) RC Cannes
6	Anna Dovgopoliuk	11 October 1985	188 cm (6 ft 2 in)	73 cm (2 ft 5 in)	(Ukraine) Volyn Universytet-Odyussh Lutsk
7	Inna Molodtsova	8 May 1986	187 cm (6 ft 2 in)	74 cm (2 ft 5 in)	(Ukraine) Volyn Universytet-Odyussh Lutsk
8	Maryna Degtyarova	22 November 1993	184 cm (6 ft 0 in)	64 cm (2 ft 1 in)	(Ukraine) Severodonchanka
9	Nataliya Chernetska	30 April 1985	183 cm (6 ft 0 in)	73 cm (2 ft 5 in)	(Ukraine) Halychanka-Dynamo-TNEU Ternopil
10	Ganna Lisieienkova	26 February 1991	188 cm (6 ft 2 in)	80 cm (2 ft 7 in)	(Ukraine) Severodonchanka
11	Iryna Komisarova	18 June 1970	185 cm (6 ft 1 in)	72 cm (2 ft 4 in)	(Ukraine) Severodonchanka
13	Ganna Burbelyuk	15 June 1993	184 cm (6 ft 0 in)	62 cm (2 ft 0 in)	(Ukraine) Severodonchanka
16	Nadiia Kodola	29 September 1988	184 cm (6 ft 0 in)	72 cm (2 ft 4 in)	(Ukraine) Halychanka-Dynamo-TNEU Ternopil

Severodonchanka 2011 squad, Inna Molodtsova, 2010-11 match report of Halychanka Ternopil and Volyn Lutsk

== Pool B ==
=== Azerbaijan ===
- Head Coach: Faig Garayev

№	Name	Date of birth	Height	Weight	2011 club
1	Darya Zamanova	30 April 1987	194 cm (6 ft 4 in)	78 cm (2 ft 7 in)	(Azerbaijan) Şahdağ-Şirvan
2	Kseniya Kovalenko	21 April 1986	190 cm (6 ft 3 in)	78 cm (2 ft 7 in)	(Azerbaijan) Lokomotiv Baku
4	Oksana Parkhomenko	28 September 1984	184 cm (6 ft 0 in)	72 cm (2 ft 4 in)	(Russia) Dinamo Moscow
5	Odina Əliyeva	22 May 1990	182 cm (6 ft 0 in)		(Azerbaijan) Şahdağ-Şirvan
7	Yelena Parkhomenko	11 September 1982	186 cm (6 ft 1 in)	68 cm (2 ft 3 in)	(Azerbaijan) Lokomotiv Baku
8	Natavan Gasimova	8 July 1985	176 cm (5 ft 9 in)	64 cm (2 ft 1 in)	(Italy) Robursport Pesaro
9	Natalya Mammadova	2 December 1984	195 cm (6 ft 5 in)	75 cm (2 ft 6 in)	(Azerbaijan) Rabita Baku
10	Oksana Mammadyarova	6 April 1978	178 cm (5 ft 10 in)	64 cm (2 ft 1 in)	(Azerbaijan) Lokomotiv Baku
12	Valeriya Korotenko	29 January 1984	171 cm (5 ft 7 in)	62 cm (2 ft 0 in)	(Azerbaijan) Azərreyl Baku
15	Aynur Kərimova	7 December 1988	189 cm (6 ft 2 in)	66 cm (2 ft 2 in)	(Azerbaijan) Azərreyl Baku
16	Oksana Kiselyova	30 May 1992	178 cm (5 ft 10 in)		(Azerbaijan) Azərreyl Baku
17	Polina Rəhimova	5 June 1990	195 cm (6 ft 5 in)	73 cm (2 ft 5 in)	(Azerbaijan) Azərreyl Baku

=== Croatia ===
- Head Coach: Damir Jurko

№	Name	Date of birth	Height	Weight	2011 club
1	Biljana Gligorović	31 October 1982	185 cm (6 ft 1 in)		(Romania) Dinamo Bucarest
2	Marijeta Draženović	19 August 1988	177 cm (5 ft 10 in)	71 cm (2 ft 4 in)	
4	Marina Miletić	21 February 1983	180 cm (5 ft 11 in)		(Azerbaijan) Rabita Baku
6	Sanja Popović	31 May 1984	186 cm (6 ft 1 in)	76 cm (2 ft 6 in)	(South Korea) GS Caltex Seoul
8	Hana Čutura	10 March 1988	194 cm (6 ft 4 in)		(Germany) USC Münster
9	Ilijana Dugandžić	17 April 1981	189 cm (6 ft 2 in)	71 cm (2 ft 4 in)	(Azerbaijan) Igtisadchi Baku
10	Mira Topić	2 June 1983	186 cm (6 ft 1 in)	73 cm (2 ft 5 in)	
14	Nikolina Kovačić	30 April 1986	180 cm (5 ft 11 in)	74 cm (2 ft 5 in)	(Italy) Volley 2002 Forlì
15	Ivana Miloš	7 September 1986	187 cm (6 ft 2 in)		(Azerbaijan) Igtisadchi Baku
16	Paola Došen	6 January 1988	177 cm (5 ft 10 in)		(Croatia) ŽOK Rijeka
17	Jelena Alajbeg	1 October 1989	183 cm (6 ft 0 in)		(Switzerland) Voléro Zürich
18	Maja Poljak	2 May 1983	194 cm (6 ft 4 in)	80 cm (2 ft 7 in)	(Turkey) Eczacıbaşı Istanbul

=== Italy ===
- Head Coach: Massimo Barbolini

№	Name	Date of birth	Height	Weight	2011 club
1	Sara Anzanello	30 July 1980	193 cm (6 ft 4 in)	78 cm (2 ft 7 in)	(Italy) GSO Villa Cortese
7	Martina Guiggi	1 May 1984	188 cm (6 ft 2 in)		(Italy) Robursport Pesaro
8	Carolina Costagrande	15 October 1980	188 cm (6 ft 2 in)	78 cm (2 ft 7 in)	(Russia) Dinamo Moscow
11	Serena Ortolani	7 January 1987	187 cm (6 ft 2 in)	63 cm (2 ft 1 in)	(Italy) Volley Bergamo
12	Francesca Piccinini	10 January 1979	184 cm (6 ft 0 in)	71 cm (2 ft 4 in)	(Italy) Volley Bergamo
13	Valentina Arrighetti	26 January 1985	185 cm (6 ft 1 in)	72 cm (2 ft 4 in)	(Italy) Volley Bergamo
14	Eleonora Lo Bianco	22 December 1979	171 cm (5 ft 7 in)	67 cm (2 ft 2 in)	(Italy) Volley Bergamo
15	Antonella Del Core	5 November 1980	180 cm (5 ft 11 in)	70 cm (2 ft 4 in)	(Turkey) Eczacıbaşı Istanbul
16	Lucia Bosetti	9 July 1989	175 cm (5 ft 9 in)	65 cm (2 ft 2 in)	(Italy) Volley Bergamo
17	Simona Gioli	17 September 1977	185 cm (6 ft 1 in)	70 cm (2 ft 4 in)	(Italy) Spes Conegliano
19	Giulia Leonardi	1 December 1987	165 cm (5 ft 5 in)	57 cm (1 ft 10 in)	(Italy) Tiboni Urbino
20	Francesca Ferretti	15 February 1984	180 cm (5 ft 11 in)	70 cm (2 ft 4 in)	(Italy) Robursport Pesaro

=== Turkey ===
- Head Coach: Marco Aurelio Motta

№	Name	Date of birth	Height	Weight	2011 club
1	Güldeniz Önal	25 March 1986	182 cm (6 ft 0 in)	67 cm (2 ft 2 in)	(Turkey) VakıfGüneş Istanbul
2	Gülden Kayalar	5 December 1980	167 cm (5 ft 6 in)	56 cm (1 ft 10 in)	(Turkey) Eczacıbaşı Istanbul
3	Gizem Güreşen	14 January 1987	178 cm (5 ft 10 in)	70 cm (2 ft 4 in)	(Turkey) VakıfGüneş Istanbul
5	Ergül Avcı	24 July 1987	192 cm (6 ft 4 in)		(Turkey) Fenerbahçe SK
6	Polen Uslupehlivan	27 August 1990	193 cm (6 ft 4 in)	65 cm (2 ft 2 in)	(Turkey) Nilüfer Bursa
7	Büşra Cansu	16 July 1990	188 cm (6 ft 2 in)	69 cm (2 ft 3 in)	(Turkey) Eczacıbaşı Istanbul
8	Bahar Toksoy	6 February 1988	190 cm (6 ft 3 in)	68 cm (2 ft 3 in)	(Turkey) VakıfGüneş Istanbul
9	Özge Kırdar	26 June 1985	183 cm (6 ft 0 in)	70 cm (2 ft 4 in)	(Turkey) VakıfGüneş Istanbul
10	Gözde Kırdar	26 June 1985	183 cm (6 ft 0 in)	70 cm (2 ft 4 in)	(Turkey) VakıfGüneş Istanbul
12	Esra Gümüş	2 October 1982	181 cm (5 ft 11 in)	76 cm (2 ft 6 in)	(Turkey) Eczacıbaşı Istanbul
13	Neriman Özsoy	13 July 1988	188 cm (6 ft 2 in)	73 cm (2 ft 5 in)	(Poland) Atom Trefl Sopot
14	Eda Erdem	22 February 1987	187 cm (6 ft 2 in)	75 cm (2 ft 6 in)	(Turkey) Fenerbahçe SK
17	Neslihan Demir	9 December 1983	187 cm (6 ft 2 in)	72 cm (2 ft 4 in)	(Turkey) Eczacıbaşı Istanbul
18	Asuman Karakoyun	16 July 1990	180 cm (5 ft 11 in)	72 cm (2 ft 4 in)	(Turkey) Eczacıbaşı Istanbul

== Pool C ==
=== Czech Republic ===
- Head Coach: Jirí Šiller

№	Name	Date of birth	Height	Weight	2011 club
1	Andrea Kossanyiová	6 August 1993	184 cm (6 ft 0 in)	74 cm (2 ft 5 in)	(Czech Republic) PVK Olymp Praga
2	Šárka Barborková	6 November 1985	192 cm (6 ft 4 in)	71 cm (2 ft 4 in)	(Germany) Raben Vilsbiburg
3	Kristýna Pastulová	22 October 1985	197 cm (6 ft 6 in)	80 cm (2 ft 7 in)	(Czech Republic) PVK Přerov
4	Aneta Havlíčková	3 July 1987	190 cm (6 ft 3 in)	88 cm (2 ft 11 in)	(Italy) FV Busto Arsizio
5	Julie Jášová	14 September 1987	179 cm (5 ft 10 in)	62 cm (2 ft 0 in)	(Germany) VT Hamburg
8	Šárka Melichárková	8 June 1990	183 cm (6 ft 0 in)	64 cm (2 ft 1 in)	(Czech Republic) Královo Pole Brno
10	Šárka Kubínová	19 April 1988	178 cm (5 ft 10 in)	66 cm (2 ft 2 in)	(Czech Republic) VK Prostějov
13	Tereza Vanžurová	4 April 1991	183 cm (6 ft 0 in)	72 cm (2 ft 4 in)	(Czech Republic) PVK Olymp Praga
14	Lucie Mühlsteinová	15 October 1984	178 cm (5 ft 10 in)	70 cm (2 ft 4 in)	(Poland) MKS Dąbrowa Górn.
15	Ivona Svobodníková	1 April 1991	191 cm (6 ft 3 in)	78 cm (2 ft 7 in)	(Czech Republic) Královo Pole Brno
16	Helena Havelková	25 July 1988	188 cm (6 ft 2 in)	64 cm (2 ft 1 in)	(Italy) FV Busto Arsizio
17	Ivana Plchotová	28 October 1992	192 cm (6 ft 4 in)	74 cm (2 ft 5 in)	(Poland) MKS Dąbrowa Górn.

=== Israel ===
- Head Coach: Arie Selinger

№	Name	Date of birth	Height	Weight	2011 club
1	Tatjana Frage	23 February 1973	183 cm (6 ft 0 in)	70 cm (2 ft 4 in)	
3	Anna Velikiy	10 December 1982	179 cm (5 ft 10 in)	69 cm (2 ft 3 in)	(Czech Republic) VK Prostějov
6	Shany Peham	3 March 1993	169 cm (5 ft 7 in)	60 cm (2 ft 0 in)	
8	Galit Devash	18 September 1986	179 cm (5 ft 10 in)	70 cm (2 ft 4 in)	
9	Adva Zinober	5 November 1982	169 cm (5 ft 7 in)	59 cm (1 ft 11 in)	
10	Inessa Birman	21 August 1978	188 cm (6 ft 2 in)	71 cm (2 ft 4 in)	(Azerbaijan) Lokomotiv Baku
11	Elvira Kolnogorov	23 July 1992	191 cm (6 ft 3 in)	85 cm (2 ft 9 in)	
12	Libi Haim	24 April 1984	182 cm (6 ft 0 in)	74 cm (2 ft 5 in)	
13	Polina Arazi	18 February 1978	187 cm (6 ft 2 in)	72 cm (2 ft 4 in)	
14	Ron Ponte	14 July 1988	173 cm (5 ft 8 in)	71 cm (2 ft 4 in)	
15	Anna Farhi	1 March 1980	189 cm (6 ft 2 in)	70 cm (2 ft 4 in)	
16	Tatiana Artmenko	2 September 1976	184 cm (6 ft 0 in)	72 cm (2 ft 4 in)	(Czech Republic) VK Prostějov
17	Inbar Vinarsky	6 November 1991	188 cm (6 ft 2 in)	63 cm (2 ft 1 in)	
19	Yael Lotan	28 February 1993	174 cm (5 ft 9 in)	58 cm (1 ft 11 in)	

=== Poland ===
- Head Coach: Alojzy Świderek

№	Name	Date of birth	Height	Weight	2011 club
1	Anna Podolec	30 October 1985	193 cm (6 ft 4 in)		(Poland) BKS Bielsko-Biała
2	Katarzyna Wellna	22 March 1985	184 cm (6 ft 0 in)		(Poland) Atom Trefl Sopot
3	Karolina Kosek	28 June 1985	183 cm (6 ft 0 in)		(Poland) Budowlani Łódź
5	Berenika Tomsia	18 March 1988	189 cm (6 ft 2 in)		(Poland) BKS Bielsko-Biała
6	Agnieszka Bednarek	20 February 1986	185 cm (6 ft 1 in)		
8	Klaudia Kaczorowska	20 December 1988	183 cm (6 ft 0 in)		(Poland) MKS Muszynianka
9	Katarzyna Jaszewska	6 December 1981	182 cm (6 ft 0 in)		(Poland) Gwardia Wrocław
10	Anita Kwiatkowska	5 March 1985	184 cm (6 ft 0 in)		(Poland) KPSK Stal Mielec
11	Krystyna Strasz	24 July 1987	165 cm (5 ft 5 in)		(Poland) MKS Dąbrowa Górnicza
12	Milena Sadurek	18 October 1984	178 cm (5 ft 10 in)		(Poland) MKS Muszynianka
13	Paulina Maj	22 March 1987	166 cm (5 ft 5 in)		(Poland) Atom Trefl Sopot
14	Joanna Wołosz	7 April 1990	181 cm (5 ft 11 in)		(Poland) Gwardia Wrocław
16	Zuzanna Efimienko	8 August 1989	195 cm (6 ft 5 in)		(Poland) Gwardia Wrocław
17	Katarzyna Skowrońska	30 June 1983	189 cm (6 ft 2 in)		(Turkey) Fenerbahçe SK

=== Romania ===
- Head Coach: Darko Zakoč

№	Name	Date of birth	Height	Weight	2011 club
2	Iuliana Nucu	4 October 1980	185 cm (6 ft 1 in)	70 cm (2 ft 4 in)	(Italy) Volley Bergamo
3	Florentina Nedelcu	26 March 1976	181 cm (5 ft 11 in)	65 cm (2 ft 2 in)	(France) Vennelles VB
4	Alexandra Trică	21 October 1985	180 cm (5 ft 11 in)	68 cm (2 ft 3 in)	(Romania) Tomis Constanța
5	Mirela Corjeutanu	6 July 1977	192 cm (6 ft 4 in)	80 cm (2 ft 7 in)	(Italy) RDM Pomezia
6	Carmen Țurlea	18 November 1975	183 cm (6 ft 0 in)	65 cm (2 ft 2 in)	(Italy) Spes Conegliano
7	Ioana Nemțanu	1 January 1989	181 cm (5 ft 11 in)	72 cm (2 ft 4 in)	(Romania) Tomis Constanța
9	Diana Neaga	24 May 1986	178 cm (5 ft 10 in)	61 cm (2 ft 0 in)	(Romania) Tomis Constanța
10	Nicoleta Manu	3 December 1980	174 cm (5 ft 9 in)	67 cm (2 ft 2 in)	(Romania) CS Știința Bacău
11	Alina Albu	6 September 1983	192 cm (6 ft 4 in)	75 cm (2 ft 6 in)	(France) ASPTT Mulhouse
13	Sabina Miclea	4 December 1990	184 cm (6 ft 0 in)	61 cm (2 ft 0 in)	
14	Elena Butnaru	27 April 1975	183 cm (6 ft 0 in)	66 cm (2 ft 2 in)	(Romania) Tomis Constanța
15	Ana Cazacu	21 July 1994	185 cm (6 ft 1 in)	72 cm (2 ft 4 in)	(Romania) Tomis Constanța
17	Daiana Mureșan	6 July 1990	187 cm (6 ft 2 in)	70 cm (2 ft 4 in)	(Poland) AZS Białystok
18	Nneka Onyejekwe	8 August 1989	188 cm (6 ft 2 in)	74 cm (2 ft 5 in)	(Switzerland) Voléro Zürich

== Pool D ==
=== Bulgaria ===
- Head Coach: Dragutin Baltić

№	Name	Date of birth	Height	Weight	2011 club
1	Lora Kitipova	19 May 1991	183 cm (6 ft 0 in)	64 cm (2 ft 1 in)	(Bulgaria) CSKA Sofia
2	Kristin Kolchagova	12 January 1991	167 cm (5 ft 6 in)	59 cm (1 ft 11 in)	
3	Tanya Sabkova	10 June 1988	185 cm (6 ft 1 in)	64 cm (2 ft 1 in)	
5	Dobriana Rabadzhieva	14 June 1991	190 cm (6 ft 3 in)	72 cm (2 ft 4 in)	(Italy) Spes Conegliano
6	Tsvetelina Zarkova	18 December 1986	187 cm (6 ft 2 in)	69 cm (2 ft 3 in)	(Russia) Samorodok Khabarovsk
7	Gabriela Koeva	25 July 1989	185 cm (6 ft 1 in)	66 cm (2 ft 2 in)	(Switzerland) Voléro Zürich
9	Lyubka Debarlieva	21 September 1980	178 cm (5 ft 10 in)	69 cm (2 ft 3 in)	
10	Kremena Kamenova	21 May 1988	185 cm (6 ft 1 in)	64 cm (2 ft 1 in)	(Azerbaijan) Lokomotiv Baku
11	Hristina Ruseva	1 October 1991	190 cm (6 ft 3 in)	77 cm (2 ft 6 in)	(Bulgaria) CSKA Sofia
12	Mariya Karakasheva	27 October 1988	182 cm (6 ft 0 in)	65 cm (2 ft 2 in)	(Bulgaria) CSKA Sofia
13	Ivelina Monova	17 January 1986	173 cm (5 ft 8 in)	58 cm (1 ft 11 in)	(Bulgaria) Maritza Plovdiv
16	Elitsa Vasileva	13 May 1990	190 cm (6 ft 3 in)	73 cm (2 ft 5 in)	(Italy) Volley Bergamo
17	Strashimira Filipova	18 August 1985	195 cm (6 ft 5 in)	78 cm (2 ft 7 in)	(Russia) Uralochka-NTMK
18	Emiliya Nikolova	26 December 1991	187 cm (6 ft 2 in)	70 cm (2 ft 4 in)	(Romania) Tomis Constanța

=== Netherlands ===
- Head Coach: Avital Selinger

№	Name	Date of birth	Height	Weight	2011 club
1	Kim Staelens	7 January 1982	182 cm (6 ft 0 in)	78 cm (2 ft 7 in)	(Germany) VT Hamburg
3	Francien Huurman	18 April 1975	192 cm (6 ft 4 in)	80 cm (2 ft 7 in)	
4	Chaïne Staelens	7 November 1980	194 cm (6 ft 4 in)	77 cm (2 ft 6 in)	(Japan) Pioneer Red Wings
5	Robin De Kruijf	5 May 1991	193 cm (6 ft 4 in)	81 cm (2 ft 8 in)	(Netherlands) TVC Amstelveen
6	Maret Grothues	16 September 1988	180 cm (5 ft 11 in)	67 cm (2 ft 2 in)	(Netherlands) TVC Amstelveen
8	Alice Blom	7 April 1980	178 cm (5 ft 10 in)	64 cm (2 ft 1 in)	(Azerbaijan) Igtisadchi Baku
9	Myrthe Schoot	29 August 1988	184 cm (6 ft 0 in)	71 cm (2 ft 4 in)	(Netherlands) TVC Amstelveen
10	Janneke van Tienen	29 May 1979	177 cm (5 ft 10 in)	73 cm (2 ft 5 in)	
11	Caroline Wensink	4 August 1984	187 cm (6 ft 2 in)	80 cm (2 ft 7 in)	(Poland) MKS Muszynianka
12	Manon Flier	8 February 1984	192 cm (6 ft 4 in)	73 cm (2 ft 5 in)	(Italy) Robursport Volley Pesaro
14	Laura Dijkema	18 February 1990	184 cm (6 ft 0 in)	71 cm (2 ft 4 in)	(Netherlands) TVC Amstelveen
15	Ingrid Visser	4 June 1977	191 cm (6 ft 3 in)	74 cm (2 ft 5 in)	(Spain) CAV Murcia 2005
16	Debby Stam	24 July 1984	184 cm (6 ft 0 in)	68 cm (2 ft 3 in)	(Poland) MKS Muszynianka
18	Lonneke Slöetjes	15 November 1990	192 cm (6 ft 4 in)	75 cm (2 ft 6 in)	(Netherlands) VV Pollux Oldenzaal

=== Russia ===
- Head Coach: Vladimir Kuzyutkin

№	Name	Date of birth	Height	Weight	2011 club
1	Maria Borodakova	8 March 1986	190 cm (6 ft 3 in)	80 cm (2 ft 7 in)	(Russia) Dinamo Kazan
2	Lesya Makhno	4 September 1981	188 cm (6 ft 2 in)	73 cm (2 ft 5 in)	(Russia) Dinamo Moscow
3	Maria Perepelkina	9 March 1984	187 cm (6 ft 2 in)	72 cm (2 ft 4 in)	(Russia) Dinamo Moscow
6	Ol'ga Bukreeva	15 May 1987	190 cm (6 ft 3 in)		(Russia) Dinamo Krasnodar
8	Nataliya Obmochaeva	1 June 1989	196 cm (6 ft 5 in)	64 cm (2 ft 1 in)	(Russia) Dinamo Moscow
9	Olga Fateeva	4 May 1984	191 cm (6 ft 3 in)	70 cm (2 ft 4 in)	(Poland) Atom Trefl Sopot
10	Iuliia Morozova	8 January 1985	194 cm (6 ft 4 in)	75 cm (2 ft 6 in)	(Russia) Avtodor-Metar
11	Ekaterina Gamova	17 October 1980	205 cm (6 ft 9 in)	72 cm (2 ft 4 in)	(Russia) Dinamo Kazan
12	Vera Ulyakina	21 August 1986	192 cm (6 ft 4 in)	79 cm (2 ft 7 in)	(Russia) Dinamo Kazan
13	Yevgeniya Startseva	12 February 1989	202 cm (6 ft 8 in)	80 cm (2 ft 7 in)	(Russia) Dinamo Krasnodar
14	Ekaterina Ulanova	5 August 1986	180 cm (5 ft 11 in)	73 cm (2 ft 5 in)	(Russia) Dinamo Kazan
16	Yulia Merkulova	17 February 1984	202 cm (6 ft 8 in)	68 cm (2 ft 3 in)	(Russia) Dinamo Moscow
17	Viktorija Kuzjakina	1 June 1985	172 cm (5 ft 8 in)	61 cm (2 ft 0 in)	(Russia) Dinamo Moscow
19	Ksenija Naumova	1 February 1990	201 cm (6 ft 7 in)	75 cm (2 ft 6 in)	(Russia) Zarechie Odintsovo

=== Spain ===
- Head Coach: Gido Vermeulen

№	Name	Date of birth	Height	Weight	2011 club
3	María Isabel Fernández	6 September 1982	194 cm (6 ft 4 in)	89 cm (2 ft 11 in)	(Azerbaijan) Igtisadchi Baku
4	Elena Esteban	13 June 1982	181 cm (5 ft 11 in)	70 cm (2 ft 4 in)	(Spain) CV Murillo
5	Milagros Collar	15 April 1988	188 cm (6 ft 2 in)	72 cm (2 ft 4 in)	(Spain) CAV Murcia 2005
6	Ana Correa	19 January 1985	186 cm (6 ft 1 in)	71 cm (2 ft 4 in)	(Spain) CV Ciutadella
7	Amaranta Fernández	11 August 1983	189 cm (6 ft 2 in)	79 cm (2 ft 7 in)	(Poland) Atom Trefl Sopot
8	Diana Sánchez	7 March 1977	180 cm (5 ft 11 in)	68 cm (2 ft 3 in)	(Spain) CV Ciutadella
9	Patricia Aranda	27 June 1979	181 cm (5 ft 11 in)	68 cm (2 ft 3 in)	(Spain) Aguere S. Cristóbal
10	Diana Castaño	5 April 1983	170 cm (5 ft 7 in)	69 cm (2 ft 3 in)	(Spain) CAV Murcia 2005
12	Sara Hernández	12 September 1986	174 cm (5 ft 9 in)	58 cm (1 ft 11 in)	(Spain) Club Voleibol Tenerife
14	Jessica Rivero	15 March 1995	180 cm (5 ft 11 in)	78 cm (2 ft 7 in)	(Spain) CV JAV Las Palmas
15	Mireya Delgado	5 November 1991	181 cm (5 ft 11 in)	73 cm (2 ft 5 in)	(Spain) CV Diego Porcelos
17	Lucía Paraja	10 February 1983	185 cm (6 ft 1 in)	75 cm (2 ft 6 in)	(Italy) Sirio Perugia
