= 2011 Women's European Volleyball League squads =

Below there are the squads from the participating teams of the 2011 Women's European Volleyball League.

== Belarus ==
- Head Coach: Viktar Hancharou

| # | Name | Date of Birth | Height | Weight | Spike | Block |
|---|---|---|---|---|---|---|
| 1 | Marina Tumas | 17.09.1984 | 188 | 72 | 320 | 310 |
| 2 | Volha Palcheuskaya | 06.12.1984 | 183 | 66 | 295 | 290 |
| 3 | Yuliya Markouskaya | 29.05.1982 | 175 | 75 | 270 | 260 |
| 5 | Nadzeya Malasai | 14.12.1990 |
| 6 | Ekaterina Skrabatun | 23.04.1987 | 195 | 72 | 310 | 300 |
| 7 | Alina Ilyuta |
| 8 | Anastasiya Harelik | 20.03.1991 |
| 9 | Katsiaryna Zakreuskaya | 29.09.1986 | 186 | 70 | 310 | 295 |
| 10 | Alena Hendzel | 21.09.1984 | 191 | 77 | 315 | 305 |
| 12 | Aksana Kavalchuk | 23.11.1979 | 186 | 70 | 328 | 318 |
| 13 | Halina Karshakevich |
| 19 | Maryna Kuchko |

== Bulgaria ==
- Head Coach: Dragutin Baltic

| # | Name | Date of Birth | Height | Weight | Spike | Block |
|---|---|---|---|---|---|---|
| 1 | Diana Nenova |
| 5 | Dobriana Rabadzhieva |
| 6 | Tsvetelina Zarkova |
| 7 | Gabriela Koeva | 25.07.1989 | 1.88 | 67 | 295 | 290 |
| 10 | Kremena Kamenova |
| 11 | Hristina Ruseva |
| 12 | Mariya Karakasheva |
| 13 | Mariya Filipova | 10.09.1982 | 178 | 68 | 295 | 275 |
| 14 | Nadezhda Shopova |
| 17 | Strashimira Filipova | 18.08.1985 | 195 | 78 | 307 | 300 |
| 18 | Emiliya Nikolova |
| 21 | Lora Kitipova |

== Croatia ==
- Head Coach: Irina Kirillova

| # | Name | Date of Birth | Height | Weight | Spike | Block |
|---|---|---|---|---|---|---|
| 1 | Biljana Gligorovic | 31.01.1982 | 182 | 65 |
| 2 | Ana Grbac | 23.03.1988 | 187 | 64 | 298 | 288 |
| 3 | Simona Usic | 04.01.1988 | 173 | 64 | 270 | 260 |
| 4 | Marina Miletic | 21.02.1983 | 180 | 65 | 290 | 284 |
| 5 | Antonija Kaleb | 02.04.1986 | 189 | 73 | 305 | 300 |
| 7 | Cecilia Dujic | 06.12.1987 | 184 | 71 | 300 | 295 |
| 8 | Hana Cutura | 10.03.1988 | 192 | 78 | 308 | 298 |
| 9 | Ilijana Dugandžic | 17.04.1981 | 189 | 71 | 300 | 297 |
| 11 | Samanta Fabris | 08.02.1992 | 188 | 79 | 318 | 304 |
| 14 | Nikolina Kovacic | 30.04.1986 | 180 | 74 | 307 | 290 |
| 16 | Paola Došen | 06.01.1988 | 177 | 61 | 290 | 284 |
| 17 | Jelena Alajbeg | 01.10.1989 | 183 | 75 | 310 | 300 |

== Czech Republic ==
- Head Coach: Jiri Siller

| # | Name | Date of Birth | Height | Weight | Spike | Block |
|---|---|---|---|---|---|---|
| 1 | Andrea Kossanyiova |
| 2 | Šárka Barborková |
| 3 | Kristyna Pastulova |
| 4 | Aneta Havlíčková | 03.07.1987 | 190 | 88 | 315 | 302 |
| 5 | Julie Jasova | 14.09.1987 | 179 | 62 | 295 | 280 |
| 6 | Vendula Merkova | 24.04.1984 | 190 | 72 | 310 | 295 |
| 8 | Sarka Melicharkova |
| 9 | Anna Kallistová | 30.10.1982 | 189 | 71 | 313 | 302 |
| 10 | Sarka Kubinova |
| 13 | Tereza Vanzurová |
| 14 | Lucie Muhlsteinova |
| 15 | Ivona Svobodnikova |
| 16 | Helena Havelková |
| 18 | Pavla Vincourova |
| 19 | Nikol Sajdova |

== France ==
- Head Coach: Fabrice Vial

| # | Name | Date of Birth | Height | Weight | Spike | Block |
|---|---|---|---|---|---|---|
| 1 | Pauline Soullard | 24.04.1985 | 183 | 66 | 295 | 285 |
| 2 | Veronika Hudima | 08.07.1988 | 185 | 72 | 294 | 283 |
| 3 | Taiana Tere | 27.05.1986 | 178 | 64 | 295 | 285 |
| 7 | Jelena Lozancic | 26.03.1983 | 186 | 63 | 300 | 289 |
| 9 | Anna Rybaczewski | 23.03.1982 | 185 | 75 | 298 | 290 |
| 11 | Armelle Faesch | 26.12.1981 | 183 | 67 | 292 | 290 |
| 12 | Déborah Ortschitt | 10.06.1987 | 165 | 55 | 292 | 280 |
| 14 | Mallory Steux | 24.10.1988 | 171 | 62 | 285 | 280 |
| 16 | Helene Schleck | 13.05.1986 | 180 | 68 | 301 | 288 |
| 17 | Alexandra Dascalu | 17.04.1987 | 184 | 71 | 294 | 283 |
| 20 | Bénédicte Mauricette | 01.06.1985 | 182 | 68 | 308 | 297 |
| 24 | Nassira Camara | 28.06.1983 | 187 | 70 | 311 | 297 |

== Greece ==
- Head Coach: Dimitrios Floros

| # | Name | Date of Birth | Height | Weight | Spike | Block |
|---|---|---|---|---|---|---|
| 1 | Evangelia Kyriakidou | 27.07.1981 | 184 | 74 | 286 | 278 |
| 2 | Nikoletta Koutouxidou | 10.01.1980 | 177 | 63 | 280 | 270 |
| 3 | Athina Papafotiou | 23.08.1989 | 180 |
| 7 | Eleni Kiosi | 27.02.1985 | 184 | 69 | 278 | 267 |
| 9 | Georgia Tzanakaki | 1.12.1980 | 189 | 85 | 280 | 278 |
| 11 | Panagiota Gkiouzeli | 17.03.1990 |
| 12 | Xanthi Mylona | 27.05.1980 | 174 | 64 | 278 | 270 |
| 14 | Evangelia Chantava | 26.10.1990 | 183 | 65 | 286 | 277 |
| 16 | Maria Lamprinidou | 29.06.1986 | 188 | 72 | 293 | 283 |
| 17 | Eirini Kelesidou | 16.05.1991 | 177 |
| 20 | Evangelia Merteki | 29.04.1991 |
| 24 | Ourania Gkouzou | 25.01.1981 | 184 | 74 | 305 | 295 |

== Hungary ==
- Head Coach: Zoltán Jókay

| # | Name | Date of Birth | Height | Weight | Spike | Block |
|---|---|---|---|---|---|---|
| 1 | Rita Liliom |
| 4 | Zsuzsanna Józsa |
| 5 | Timea Kovacs | 02.05.1986 | 185 | 65 | 298 | 280 |
| 6 | Barbara Degi | 29.11.1983 | 185 | 72 | 305 | 288 |
| 7 | Beatrix Melendez Pal |
| 8 | Zsuzsanna Talas |
| 9 | Zsanett Miklai |
| 13 | Katalin Kiss | 02.02.1979 |
| 14 | Renata Sandor |
| 15 | Dora Kotel | 16.06.1988 | 175 | 61 | 273 | 263 |
| 17 | Anita Filipovics | 09.04.1988 | 191 | 75 | 306 | 285 |
| 18 | Julia Milovits |

== Israel ==
- Head Coach: Arie Selinger

| # | Name | Date of Birth | Height | Weight | Spike | Block |
|---|---|---|---|---|---|---|
| 1 | Tatjana Frage-Gerber | 23.02.1973 | 183 | 70 | 312 | 302 |
| 3 | Anna Velikiy | 10.12.1982 | 179 | 69 | 310 | 300 |
| 4 | Shir-Lee Rooney | 14.07.1989 | 186 | 73 | 294 | 286 |
| 8 | Galit Devash | 18.09.1986 | 180 | 74 | 296 | 287 |
| 9 | Adva Zinober | 5.11.1982 | 173 | 61 | 270 | 250 |
| 10 | Inessa Birman-Vysotski |
| 12 | Libi Haim | 24.04.1984 | 182 | 74 | 298 | 286 |
| 13 | Polina Arazi |
| 14 | Ron Ponte | 14.07.1988 | 175 | 74 | 278 | 267 |
| 15 | Anna Farhi |
| 16 | Tatiana Artmenko | 02.09.1976 | 182 | 72 | 310 | 300 |
| 17 | Inbar Vinarsky |

== Romania ==
- Head Coach: Darko Zakoc

| # | Name | Date of Birth | Height | Weight | Spike | Block |
|---|---|---|---|---|---|---|
| 1 | Ioana Nemtanu | 01.01.1989 | 184 |
| 2 | Ana Cristina Cazacu | 21.07.1994 | 183 | 75 | 240 | 294 |
| 4 | Alexandra Romela Trica | 21.10.1985 |
| 6 | Alexandra Sobo | 25.04.1987 |
| 8 | Adina Stanciu | 17.12.1986 |
| 9 | Diana-Ioana Neaga | 24.05.1986 |
| 10 | Nicoleta Manu | 03.12.1980 | 174 | 67 | 276 | 258 |
| 11 | Alina Speranta Albu | 06.09.1983 |
| 12 | Adina Salaoru | 05.08.1989 |
| 13 | Sabina Miclea Grigoruta | 04.12.1990 | 184 | 61 | 290 | 282 |
| 17 | Daiana Georgiana Muresan | 06.07.1990 |
| 18 | Nneka Obiamaka Onyejekwe | 18.08.1989 | 188 | 74 | 310 | 298 |

== Spain ==
- Head Coach: Gido Vermeulen

| # | Name | Date of Birth | Height | Weight | Spike | Block |
|---|---|---|---|---|---|---|
| 1 | Rocio Gómez |
| 3 | Maria Isabel Fernández |
| 4 | Marta García |
| 5 | Milagros Collar |
| 6 | Ana Mirtha Correa |
| 8 | Diana Sánchez | 7.03.1977 | 180 | 67 | 277 | 269 |
| 9 | Patricia Aranda | 27.06.1979 | 181 | 68 | 295 | 280 |
| 10 | Diana Castaño |
| 12 | Sara Hernández |
| 15 | Mireya Delgado |
| 16 | María Segura |
| 18 | Alba Sánchez |

== Serbia ==
- Head Coach: Zoran Terzić

| # | Name | Date of Birth | Height | Weight | Spike | Block |
|---|---|---|---|---|---|---|
| 1 | Ana Lazarević | 04.07.1991 | 186 | 74 | 280 | 268 |
| 2 | Jovana Brakočević | 05.03.1988 | 196 | 77 | 309 | 295 |
| 3 | Sanja Malagurski | 08.06.1990 | 191 | 75 | 305 | 295 |
| 4 | Bojana Živković | 29.03.1988 | 185 | 70 | 292 | 284 |
| 5 | Nataša Krsmanović | 19.06.1985 | 188 | 73 | 294 | 273 |
| 6 | Tijana Malešević | 18.03.1991 | 184 | 73 | 289 | 288 |
| 7 | Brižitka Molnar | 28.07.1985 | 182 | 66 | 304 | 290 |
| 8 | Ana Antonijević | 26.08.1987 | 185 | 71 | 282 | 269 |
| 9 | Jovana Vesović | 21.06.1987 | 182 | 68 | 283 | 268 |
| 14 | Nađa Ninković | 01.11.1991 | 193 | 77 | 301 | 286 |
| 16 | Milena Rašić | 25.10.1990 | 193 | 75 | 303 | 293 |
| 17 | Silvija Popović | 15.03.1986 | 175 | 60 | 228 | 226 |

== Turkey ==
- Head Coach: Marco Aurélio Motta

| # | Name | Date of Birth | Height | Weight | Spike | Block |
|---|---|---|---|---|---|---|
| 1 | Asuman Karakoyun | 16.07.1990 | 180 | 72 | 300 | 290 |
| 3 | Gizem Güreşen | 14.01.1987 | 178 | 70 | 250 | 270 |
| 4 | Elif Onur | 20.12.1989 | 185 | 67 | 290 | 280 |
| 6 | Polen Uslupehlivan | 27.08.1990 | 193 | 65 | 308 | 300 |
| 8 | Bahar Toksoy | 06.02.1988 | 190 | 68 | 315 | 305 |
| 10 | Güldeniz Önal | 25.03.1986 | 182 | 67 | 306 | 290 |
| 11 | Naz Aydemir | 14.08.1990 | 186 | 68 | 304 | 300 |
| 12 | Esra Gümüş | 02.10.1982 | 181 | 76 | 305 | 297 |
| 14 | Eda Erdem | 22.06.1987 | 187 | 75 | 308 | 302 |
| 15 | Nesve Büyükbayram | 01.01.1990 | 188 | 74 | 296 | 288 |
| 16 | Selime Ilyasoglu | 18.11.1988 | 183 | 67 |
| 17 | Neslihan Demir Darnel | 09.12.1983 | 185 | 72 | 315 | 306 |
| 21 | Ceren Kestirengöz | 19.07.1993 | 188 | 82 | 290 | 280 |
