= Velikoye (disambiguation) =

Velikoye may refer to:

- Velikoye, Kaduysky District, Vologda Oblast
- Velikoye, Sheksninsky District, Vologda Oblast
- Velikoye, Kubenskoye Rural Settlement, Vologodsky District, Vologda Oblast
- Velikoye, Prilukskoye Rural Settlement, Vologodsky District, Vologda Oblast

== See also ==
- Velika (disambiguation)
- Velikaya (disambiguation)
- Veliky (disambiguation)
