= Veliky (rural locality) =

Veliky (Russian: Вели́кий; masculine), Velikaya (Вели́кая; feminine), or Velikoye (Вели́кое; neuter) is the name of several rural localities in Russia.

== Modern localities ==
- Velikoye, Primorsky District, Arkhangelsk Oblast, a village in Zaostrovsky Selsoviet of Primorsky District of Arkhangelsk Oblast
- Velikoye, Velsky District, Arkhangelsk Oblast, a settlement in Puysky Selsoviet of Velsky District of Arkhangelsk Oblast
- Velikoye, Leningrad Oblast, a logging depot settlement in Seleznevskoye Settlement Municipal Formation of Vyborgsky District of Leningrad Oblast
- Velikoye, Kaduysky District, Vologda Oblast, a selo in Velikoselsky Selsoviet of Kaduysky District of Vologda Oblast
- Velikoye, Sheksninsky District, Vologda Oblast, a village in Domshinsky Selsoviet of Sheksninsky District of Vologda Oblast
- Velikoye, Tarnogsky District, Vologda Oblast, a village in Ramensky Selsoviet of Tarnogsky District of Vologda Oblast
- Velikoye, Nesvoysky Selsoviet, Vologodsky District, Vologda Oblast, a village in Nesvoysky Selsoviet of Vologodsky District of Vologda Oblast
- Velikoye, Priluksky Selsoviet, Vologodsky District, Vologda Oblast, a village in Priluksky Selsoviet of Vologodsky District of Vologda Oblast
- Velikoye, Yaroslavl Oblast, a selo in Velikoselsky Rural Okrug of Gavrilov-Yamsky District of Yaroslavl Oblast
- Velikaya, Ustyansky District, Arkhangelsk Oblast, a village in Dmitriyevsky Selsoviet of Ustyansky District of Arkhangelsk Oblast
- Velikaya, Verkhnetoyemsky District, Arkhangelsk Oblast, a village in Gorkovsky Selsoviet of Verkhnetoyemsky District of Arkhangelsk Oblast
- Velikaya, Kirov Oblast, a railway station in Verkhovinsky Rural Okrug of Yuryansky District of Kirov Oblast
- Velikaya, Pskov Oblast, a village in Pustoshkinsky District of Pskov Oblast
- Velikaya, Cherepovetsky District, Vologda Oblast, a village in Anninsky Selsoviet of Cherepovetsky District of Vologda Oblast
- Velikaya, Tarnogsky District, Vologda Oblast, a village in Verkhovsky Selsoviet of Tarnogsky District of Vologda Oblast

== Abolished localities ==
- Velikaya, Novgorod Oblast, a village under the administrative jurisdiction of the urban-type settlement of Lyubytino in Lyubytinsky District of Novgorod Oblast; abolished in December 2012
