= Velikaya (disambiguation) =

Velikaya is a river in Pskov Oblast, Russia.

Velikaya (Russian: Вели́кая) may also refer to:

== Populated places ==
- Velikaya, Cherepovetsky District, Vologda Oblast
- Velikaya, Tarnogsky District, Vologda Oblast

== Rivers ==
- Velikaya (Chukotka), river in Chukotka
- Velikaya (river, Vyatka tributary), right tributary of Vyatka River
- Velikaya (river, Gulf of Finland), river in Finland (Vilajoki) and Leningrad Oblast, Russia
- Velikaya (river, Gladyshevskoye), river in Leningrad Oblast, Russia

== Other ==
- Sofya Velikaya, Russian sabre fencer
- Velikaya, Russian title of Catherine the Great (2015 TV series)

== See also ==
- Velika (disambiguation)
- Veliky (disambiguation)
- Velikoye (disambiguation)
