= Romanian Volleyball Player of the Year =

The Romanian Volleyball Player of the Year has been chosen annually by the Romanian Volleyball Federation.

== Women's Volleyball Player of the Year ==
Year	Winner	Runner-up	Third place	Fourth place
2018	Nneka Onyejekwe	Ioana Baciu	Adina Salaoru	Alexandra Alice Kapelovies
2017	Nneka Onyejekwe	Adina Salaoru	Cristina Cazacu	Ioana Baciu
2016	Adina Salaoru	Georgiana Faleș	Cristina Cazacu	Roxana Bacșiș
2014	Denisa Rogojinaru	Alexandra Sobo	Diana Calotă	Nneka Onyejekwe
2007	Carmen Țurlea	Alida Marcovici	Daniela Mincă	Iuliana Nucu

== Volleyball Player of the Year ==
Year	Winner	Runner-up	Third place	Fourth place	Fifth place
2018	Laurențiu Lică	Cristian Bartha	Marian Bala	Adrian Aciobăniței	Gabriel Cherbeleață
2017	Laurențiu Lică	Cristian Bartha	Marian Bala	Adrian Aciobăniței	Andrei Spînu
2016	Laurențiu Lică	Bogdan Olteanu	Cristian Bartha	Adrian Aciobăniței	Marian Bala
2014	Bogdan Olteanu (4)	Andrei Spînu	Laurențiu Lică	Cristian Bartha	Marian Bala
2007	Sergiu Stancu	Adrian Feher	Valentin Pereu	Fabian Birău	Corneliu Andrieș
