= 1994–95 FC Dinamo București season =

FC Dinamo București
1994–95 season
- Head coach: Ion Moldovan (until 14 December); Remus Vlad (from 7 January)
- Divizia A: 3rd
- Romanian Cup: Last 16
- UEFA Cup: First round
- Top goalscorer: Viorel Moldovan, Gheorghe Ceaușilă (6 goals)

The 1994–95 season was FC Dinamo București's 46th season in Divizia A. Dinamo brought Ion Moldovan as head coach, but the team was 11th after the first half of the season. At the beginning of the second half, Moldovan was replaced by Remus Vlad, who started the second phase with five consecutive victories. The team finished the championship in the 3rd place.

After the final tournament of the world championship, FRF aligned with the world practice and decided to award 3 points for the victory, instead of 2 points as before. Also after the English fashion, FRF decided to set up a new trophy, the Romanian Super Cup, which was to be contested between the champion team and the winner of the Romanian Cup in the respective season.

Dinamo had a new record of debutants in this season: 16 – Vasile Brătianu, Gheorghe Ceaușilă, Razvan Chiriță, Mihai Drăguș, Cătălin Hîldan, Marian Ivan, Laurențiu Lică, Simion Mironaș, Dănuț Moisescu, Constantin Moldoveanu, Radu Niculescu, Florentin Petre, Cristian Savu, Ion Sburlea, Mihai Tararache, Constantin Varga.

== Results ==
Divizia A
Round	Date	Opponent	Stadium	Result	Goals for Dinamo
1	20 August 1994	Electroputere Craiova	A	1–3	Demollari 12
2	27 August 1994	FC Național	H	3–1	Pușcaș 32, Demollari 75, Ceaușilă 83
3	31 August 1994	Ceahlăul Piatra Neamț	A	3–3	Ceaușilă 23, Moldovan 64, Demollari 68
4	9 September 1994	Gloria Bistrița	H	7–4	Moldovan 3,10, M.Pană 13, Ceaușilă 49,59,82p, Demollari 40
5	17 September 1994	FC Argeș	A	1–2	Moga 27
6	23 September 1994	FC Maramureș Baia Mare	H	2–0	Demollari 47, Moldovan 61
7	2 October 1994	Steaua București	A	0–2	
8	15 October 1994	Universitatea Cluj	H	2–0	Petre 3, Ceaușilă 52 p
9	22 October 1994	FC Brașov	A	0–0	
10	28 October 1994	Universitatea Craiova	H	0–1	
11	5 November 1994	Sportul Studențesc	H	2–0	Moldovan 24, P. Marin 39 o.g.
12	16 November 1994	Petrolul Ploiești	A	0–1	
13	19 November 1994	Oțelul Galați	H	3–2	Moldovan 17, Ivan 48, Moga 53
14	26 November 1994	Farul Constanța	A	0–1	
15	3 December 1994	Rapid București	H	2–0	Ivan 45, Tararache 82
16	7 December 1994	Inter Sibiu	A	0–2	
17	17 December 1994	UTA	H	1–1	Moisescu 71
18	4 March 1995	Electroputere Craiova	H	3–0	C. Pană 48, Ivan 49, Mihali 63
19	11 March 1995	FC Național	A	3–2	Mateuț 44, 68, Bătrînu 89o.g.
20	18 March 1995	Ceahlăul Piatra Neamț	H	1–0	Savu 73
21	22 March 1995	Gloria Bistrița	A	2–1	Mateuț 35, Savu 55
22	1 April 1995	FC Argeș	H	4–0	Savu 5, Ivan 49, 82, Mateuț 78
23	8 April 1995	FC Maramureș Baia Mare	A	0–2	
24	15 April 1995	Steaua București	H	0–0	
25	19 April 1995	Universitatea Cluj	A	1–0	Savu 83
26	29 April 1995	FC Brașov	H	4–0	Savu 41, Moldovan 53, 73, Varga 83
27	5 May 1995	Universitatea Craiova	A	0–1	
28	13 May 1995	Sportul Studențesc	A	4–0	Moga 2, Mateuț 47, 52, Ivan 71
29	20 May 1995	Petrolul Ploiești	H	1–0	Moldovan 65
30	27 May 1995	Oțelul Galați	A	2–1	Mateuț 47p, 55
31	31 May 1995	Farul Constanța	H	4–2	Ivan 16, Barbu 18og, Moldovan 30, Cheregi 63
32	10 June 1995	Rapid București	A	2–2	Mateuț 20, 60p
33	14 June 1995	Inter Sibiu	H	2–1	Fulga 50, Savu 56
34	17 June 1995	UTA	A	1–0	Mihali 87

Cupa României
Round	Date	Opponent	Stadium	Result	Goals for Dinamo
Last 32	26 February 1994	Dacia Pitești	Pitești	3–1	Cheregi 5, Ivan 40, Pușcaș 90
Last 16	15 March 1995	Universitatea Craiova	Pitești	1–3	Mateuț 44

== UEFA Cup ==
First round

13 September 1994

Trabzonspor (Turkey)	2–1	(Romania) Dinamo București
Kaynak 7'; Boz 19'	Report	Ivan 28'

Hüseyin Avni Aker Stadium, Trabzon
Attendance: 12.000
Referee: Angelo Amendolia (Italy)

27 September 1994

Dinamo București (Romania)	3–3	(Turkey) Trabzonspor
Ceaușilă 9'; Niculescu 51'; Lică 82'	Report	Orhan 21'; Kaynak 23'; Boz 78'

Stadionul Dinamo, Bucharest
Attendance: 8.000
Referee: Gerard Ashby (England)

Trabzonspor won 5–4 on aggregate.

== Squad ==
Goalkeepers: Florin Prunea (17/0), Florin Tene (13/0).

Defenders: Gheorghe Mihali (23/1), Zoltan Kadar (22/0), Leontin Grozavu (15/0), Florin Constantinovici (14/0), Cornel Mirea (9/0), Ion Sburlea (7/0), Marian Pană (6/1), Constantin Varga (6/0), Vasile Brătianu (4/0), Emanuel Moldoveanu (4/0), Simion Mironaş (2/0), Irinel Voicu (0/0).

Midfielders: Sebastian Moga (21/2), Costel Pană (13/1), Dănuţ Moisescu (12/1), Mihai Tararache (11/1), Dorin Mateuţ (9/4), Florentin Petre (7/1), Marius Cheregi (5/0), Cătălin Hîldan (3/0), Laurențiu Lică (3/0), Ionel Fulga (2/0), Dorel Chiriţă (1/0), Marius Coporan (0/0), Eugen Popistașu (0/0), Cezar Dinu (0/0).

Forwards: Marian Ivan (21/5), Viorel Moldovan (20/6), Sulejman Demollari (14/5), Gheorghe Ceaușilă (10/6), Cristian Pușcaș (9/1), Marian Savu (4/3), Radu Niculescu (3/0), Mihai Drăguş (0/0), Ionuţ Savu (0/0), Sorin Bucuroaia (0/0).

== New Transfers ==
Dinamo signed Dorin Mateuţ from Reggiana, Gheorghe Ceaușilă from PAOK FC, Marian Ivan from FC Brașov, Simion Mironaş from Gloria Bistrița and Radu Niculescu from FC Inter Sibiu.

In the winter break, Marius Cheregi was signed from Samsunspor, Constantin Varga from FC Politehnica Timișoara and Ion Sburlea from Universitatea Craiova.
