= Veliky =

Veliky, or similar, may refer to:

- Veliky (rural locality) (Velikaya, Velikoye), name of several rural localities in Russia
- Veliky (surname)
- Veliky Island, White Sea, Russia

== See also ==
- Petr Veliky (disambiguation) or Peter the Great
- Sissoi Veliky (disambiguation)
- Velika (disambiguation)
- Velikaya (disambiguation)
