= Frage =

Frage may refer to:

- Tatjana Frage (born 1973), Israeli volleyball player
- Frage, a move in the card game German Solo#Frage
