= Elvira Kolnogorov =

Israeli volleyball player (born 1992)

Elvira Kolnogorov אלווירה קולנוגורוב

Personal information
- Nationality: Israeli
- Born: 23 July 1992 (age 34)
- Height: 191 cm (75 in)
- Weight: 85 kg (187 lb)

Volleyball information
- Position: right side hitter
- Number: 11 (national team)

National team
2011	Israel

Elvira Kolnogorov (Hebrew: אלווירה קולנוגורוב; born 23 July 1992) is an Israeli female former volleyball player, playing as a right side hitter.

She was part of the Israel women's national volleyball team. She competed at the 2011 Women's European Volleyball Championship.
