= Inbar Vinarsky =

Israeli volleyball player (born 1991)

Inbar Vinarsky ענבר וינרסקי

Personal information
- Nationality: Israeli
- Born: 6 November 1991 (age 34)
- Height: 188 cm (74 in)
- Weight: 63 kg (139 lb)

Volleyball information
- Position: central
- Number: 17 (national team)

Career
Years	Teams
2011

National team
2011	Israel

Inbar Vinarsky (Hebrew: ענבר וינרסקי; born 6 November 1991) is an Israeli female former volleyball player, playing as a central. She was part of the Israel women's national volleyball team. She played at Israeli Women's Volleyball League for Hapoel Ironi Kiryat Ata, Hapoel Kfar Saba and for Maccabi Raanana and for University of San Francisco.

She competed at the 2011 Women's European Volleyball Championship. At club level she played for Raanana VBC, and at university level she played for the University of San Francisco.
