= Israel national volleyball team =

Israel national volleyball team may refer to:

- Israel men's national volleyball team
- Israel women's national volleyball team
