= Monov =

Monov (feminine: Monova) is Bulgarian surname. Notable people with the surname include:

- Ivelina Monova (born 1986), Bulgarian volleyball player
- Krasimir Monov (born 1983), Bulgarian ice hockey player
- Lyubomir Monov (born 1967), Bulgarian brigade general
- Nikolay Monov, Russian and Moldovan wrestler
- Polina Monova (born 1993), Russian tennis player
