= Inessa Birman =

Israeli volleyball player (born 1978)

Inessa Birman אינסה בירמן

Personal information
- Nationality: Israeli
- Born: 21 August 1978 (age 48)
- Height: 188 cm (74 in)
- Weight: 71 kg (157 lb)

Volleyball information
- Position: central
- Number: 10 (national team)

Career
Years	Teams
2011	Lokomotiv Baku

National team
2011	Israel

Inessa Birman (Hebrew: אינסה בירמן; born 21 August 1978) is an Israeli female former volleyball player, playing as a central. She was part of the Israel women's national volleyball team.

She competed at the 2011 Women's European Volleyball Championship. On club level she played for Lokomotiv Baku.
