= Veliky (surname) =

Veliky (also Veliky, Velikyi, Velykyi, etc., masculine; Cyrillic: Великий) or Velikaya (also Veliykaya or Velikaia feminine) means large, great/grand, or combines these two meaning in several Slavic languages. It is the surname of the following notable people:

- Anna Velikiy (born 1982), Israeli volleyball player
- Oleg Velyky (1977–2010), Ukrainian and German handball player
- Sofya Velikaya (born 1985), Russian sabre fencer

== See also ==
- Veliky (disambiguation)
