= Yael Lotan =

Yael Lotan may refer to:

- Yael Lotan (volleyball) (born 1993), Israeli volleyball player
- Yael Lotan (writer) (1935–2009), Israeli writer and activist
