= Adva =

Adva may refer to:

== Given name ==
- Adva Cohen (born 1996), Israeli runner
- Adva Reichman, Israeli writer and director
- Adva Twil (born 1985), Israeli football forward
- Adva Zinober (born 1982), Israeli female former volleyball player

== Other ==
- Adva Center, non-partisan Israeli policy analysis center
- AdvaMed, American medical device trade association
- ADVA Optical Networking, European telecommunications vendor
