= Galit Devash =

Israeli volleyball player (born 1986)

Galit Devash גלית דבש

Personal information
- Nationality: Israeli
- Born: 18 September 1986 (age 40)
- Height: 179 cm (70 in)
- Weight: 70 kg (154 lb)

Volleyball information
- Position: central
- Number: 8 (national team)

National team
2011	Israel

Galya "Galit" Devash (Hebrew: גליה "גלית" דבש; born 18 September 1986) is an Israeli female former volleyball player, playing as a central. She was part of the Israel women's national volleyball team. She plays for Hapoel Kfar Saba at Israeli Women's Volleyball League since 2011.

== Early life ==
Devash was raised in Israel, to a family of Jewish background.

She competed at the 2011 Women's European Volleyball Championship.
