= Shany Peham =

Israeli volleyball player (born 1993)

Shany Peham שני פהאם
Personal information
- Nationality: Israeli
- Born: 3 March 1993 (age 33)
- Height: 169 cm (67 in)
- Weight: 60 kg (132 lb)

Volleyball information
- Position: setter
- Number: 6 (national team)

National team
- Years: Team
- 2011: Israel

Shany Peham (Hebrew: שני פהאם; born 3 March 1993) is an Israeli female volleyball player, playing as a setter, in 2023–2024 season she plays for Maccabi Raanana in Israel women's volleyball league.

She was part of the Israel women's national volleyball team. She competed at the 2011 Women's European Volleyball Championship.
