= Kraljev Vrh =

Kraljev Vrh may refer to:

- Kraljev Vrh, Jakovlje, a village in Zagreb County, Croatia
- Kraljev Vrh, Preseka, a village in Zagreb County, Croatia
- Kraljev Vrh, Primorje-Gorski Kotar County, a village near Čabar, Croatia
