= Libi Haim =

Israeli volleyball player (born 1984)

Libi Haim ליבי חיים

Personal information
- Nationality: Israeli
- Born: 24 April 1984 (age 42)
- Height: 182 cm (72 in)
- Weight: 74 kg (163 lb)

Volleyball information
- Position: setter
- Number: 12 (national team)

National team
2011	Israel

Libi Haim (Hebrew: ליבי חיים; born 24 April 1984) is an Israeli female former volleyball player, playing as a setter. She was part of the Israel women's national volleyball team. she played at Israeli Women's Volleyball League for Hapoel Ironi Kiryat Ata, Hapoel Kfar Saba and Maccabi Raanana.

She competed at the 2011 Women's European Volleyball Championship.
