= Kristin Kolchagova =

Bulgarian volleyball player (born 1991)

Personal information
- Nationality: Bulgarian
- Born: 12 January 1991 (age 35)
- Height: 167 cm (66 in)
- Weight: 59 kg (130 lb)

Volleyball information
- Position: libero
- Number: 2 (national team)

National team
2011	Bulgaria

Kristin Kolchagova (Bulgarian: Кристин Колчагова) (born 12 January 1991) is a Bulgarian female former volleyball player, playing as a libero. She was part of the Bulgaria women's national volleyball team.

She competed at the 2009 Women's European Volleyball Championship, 2011 Women's European Volleyball Championship.
