= Tanya Sabkova =

Bulgarian volleyball player (born 1988)

Personal information
- Nationality: Bulgarian
- Born: 10 June 1988 (age 38)
- Height: 185 cm (73 in)
- Weight: 64 kg (141 lb)

Volleyball information
- Position: right-side hitter
- Number: 3 (national team)

National team
2011	Bulgaria

Tanya Sabkova (Bulgarian: Таня Събкова; born 10 June 1988) is a Bulgarian female former volleyball player, playing as a right-side hitter. She was part of the Bulgaria women's national volleyball team.

She competed at the 2009 Women's European Volleyball Championship. She competed at the 2011 Women's European Volleyball Championship.
