= Tatjana Frage =

Israeli volleyball player (born 1973)

Tatjana Frage 'טטיאנה פראג

Personal information
- Nationality: Israeli
- Born: 23 February 1973 (age 53)
- Height: 183 cm (72 in)
- Weight: 70 kg (154 lb)

Volleyball information
- Position: right side hitter
- Number: 1 (national team)

National team
2011	Israel

Tatjana Frage (Hebrew: 'טטיאנה פראג; born 23 February 1973) is an Israeli female former volleyball player, playing as a right side hitter. She was part of the Israel women's national volleyball team.

She competed at the 2011 Women's European Volleyball Championship.
