= Preseka, Zagreb County =

Preseka
- Municipality
- Municipality of Preseka
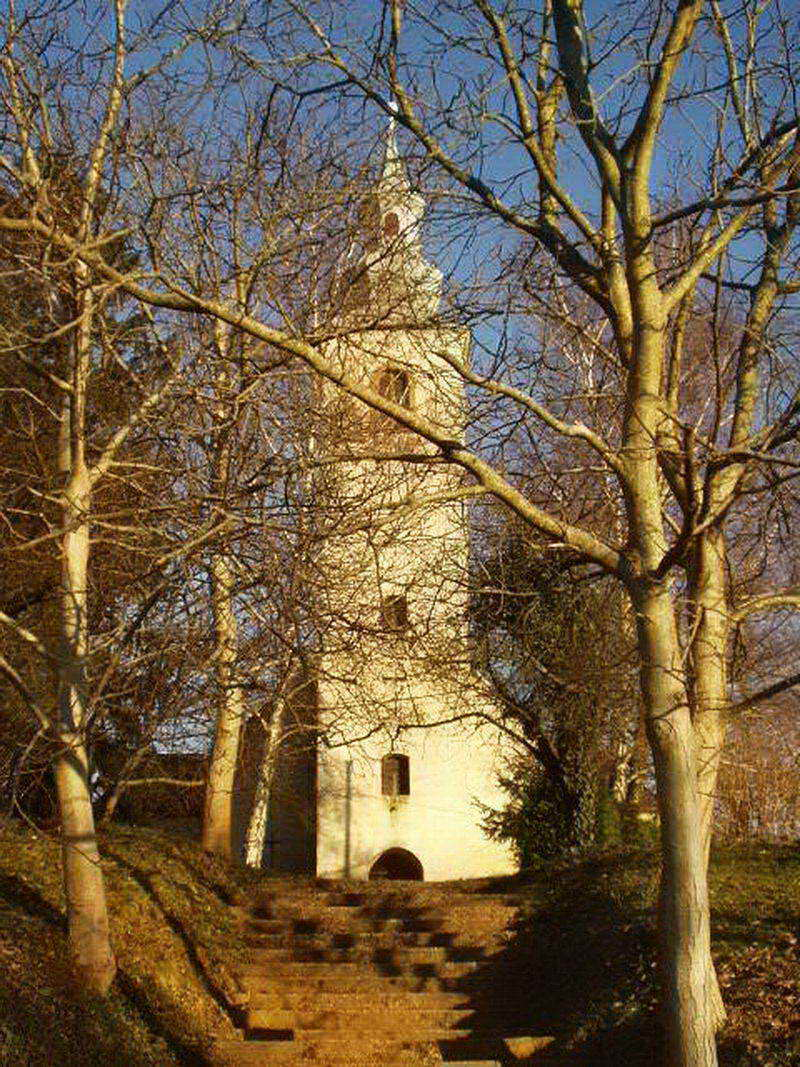

- Location within Croatia
- Coordinates: 45.975°N 16.39°E
- Country: Croatia
- County: Zagreb County

Area
  - Municipality: 46.1 km^{2} (17.8 sq mi)
  - Urban: 2.6 km^{2} (1.0 sq mi)

Population (2021)
  - Municipality: 1,129
  - Density: 24.5/km^{2} (63.4/sq mi)
  - Urban: 83
  - Urban density: 32/km^{2} (83/sq mi)
- Time zone: UTC+1 (Central European Time)
- Vehicle registration: ZG
- Website: opcina-preseka.hr

Preseka is a municipality in Croatia in the Zagreb County.

In the 2011, there were a total of 1,448 inhabitants, in the following settlements:

- Donja Velika, population 68
- Gornja Velika, population 62
- Gornjaki, population 49
- Kamenica, population 64
- Kraljev Vrh, population 99
- Krušljevec, population 104
- Ledina, population 198
- Pogančec, population 125
- Preseka, population 104
- Slatina, population 117
- Srednja Velika, population 58
- Strmec, population 25
- Šelovec, population 161
- Vinkovec, population 136
- Žabnjak, population 78

In the same sensus, the absolute majority of population were Croats.
