= Anita Kwiatkowska =

Polish volleyball player (born 1985)

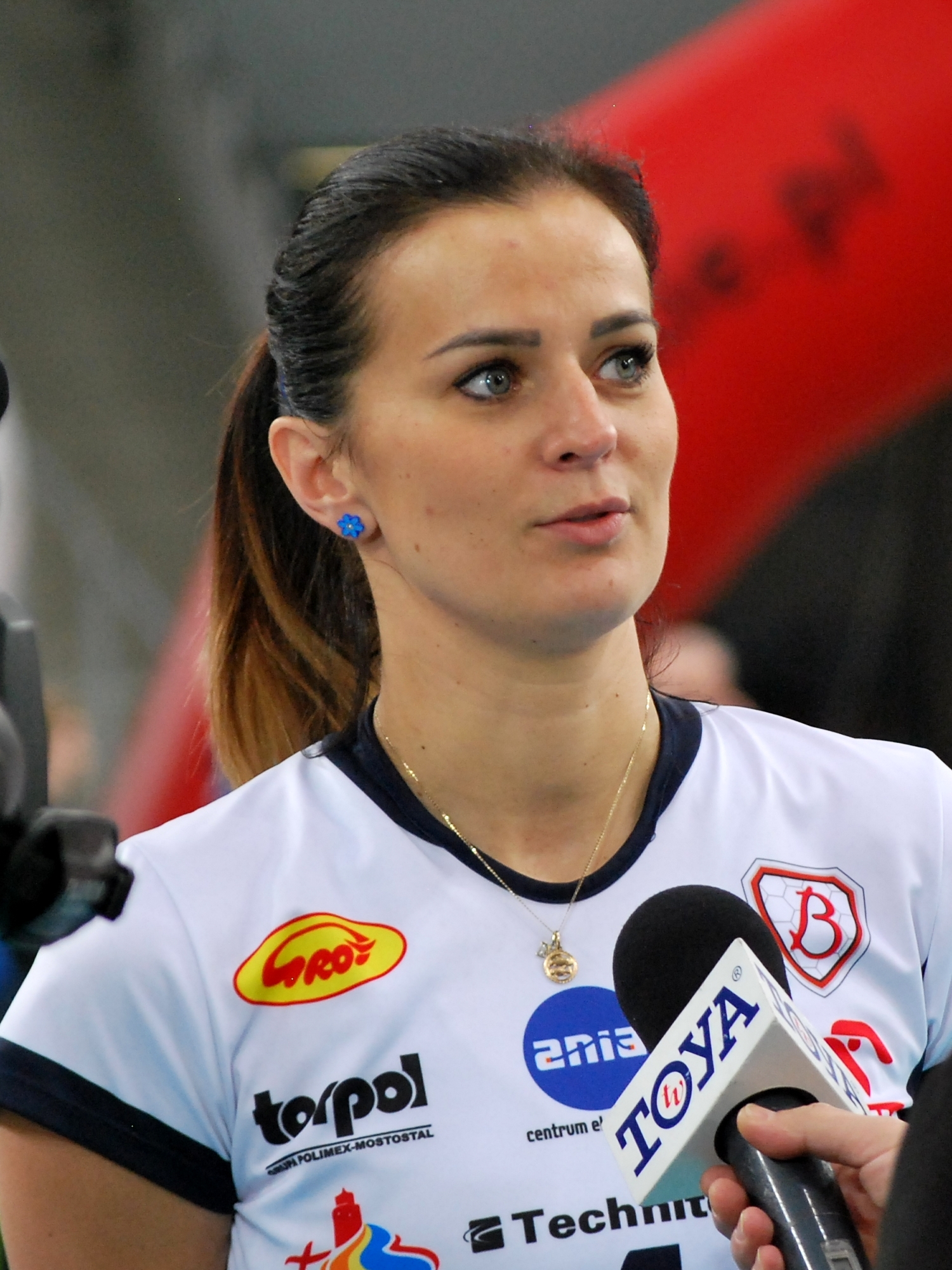

Personal information
- Nationality: Polish
- Born: 5 March 1985 (age 41); Piła, Poland
- Height: 184 cm (72 in)

Volleyball information
- Position: right side hitter
- Number: 10 (national team)

Career
Years	Teams
2011	KPSK Stal Mielec

National team
2011	Poland

Anita Kwiatkowska, née Chojnacka (born 5 March 1985) is a Polish former volleyball player, playing as a right side hitter. She was part of the Poland women's national volleyball team.

She competed at the 2011 Women's European Volleyball Championship. On club level she played for KPSK Stal Mielec.
