= Alexandra Trică =

Romanian volleyball player (born 1985)

Personal information
- Full name: Alexandra Romela Trică
- Nationality: Romanian
- Born: 21 October 1985 (age 41)
- Height: 180 cm (5 ft 11 in)
- Weight: 68 kg (150 lb)

Volleyball information
- Position: right-side hitter
- Number: 4 (national team)

Career
| Years | Teams |
|---|---|
| 2011 | Tomis Constanza |

National team
| 2011 | Romania |

Alexandra Trică (born 21 October 1985) is a Romanian female former volleyball player, playing as a right-side hitter. She was part of the Romania women's national volleyball team.

She competed at the 2011 Women's European Volleyball Championship. On club level, she played for Tomis Constanza.
