= Yael Lotan (volleyball) =

Israeli volleyball player (born 1993)

Yael Lotan יעל לוטן
Personal information
- Nationality: Israeli
- Born: 28 February 1993 (age 33)
- Height: 174 cm (69 in)
- Weight: 58 kg (128 lb)

Volleyball information
- Position: outside hitter
- Number: 19 (national team)

National team
- Years: Team
- 2011: Israel

Yael Lotan (Hebrew: יעל לוטן; born 28 February 1993) is an Israeli female former volleyball player, playing as an outside hitter. She was part of the Israel women's national volleyball team.

She competed at the 2011 Women's European Volleyball Championship.
