= Tatiana Artmenko =

Israeli volleyball player (born 1976)

Tatiana Artmenko טטיאנה ארטמנקו
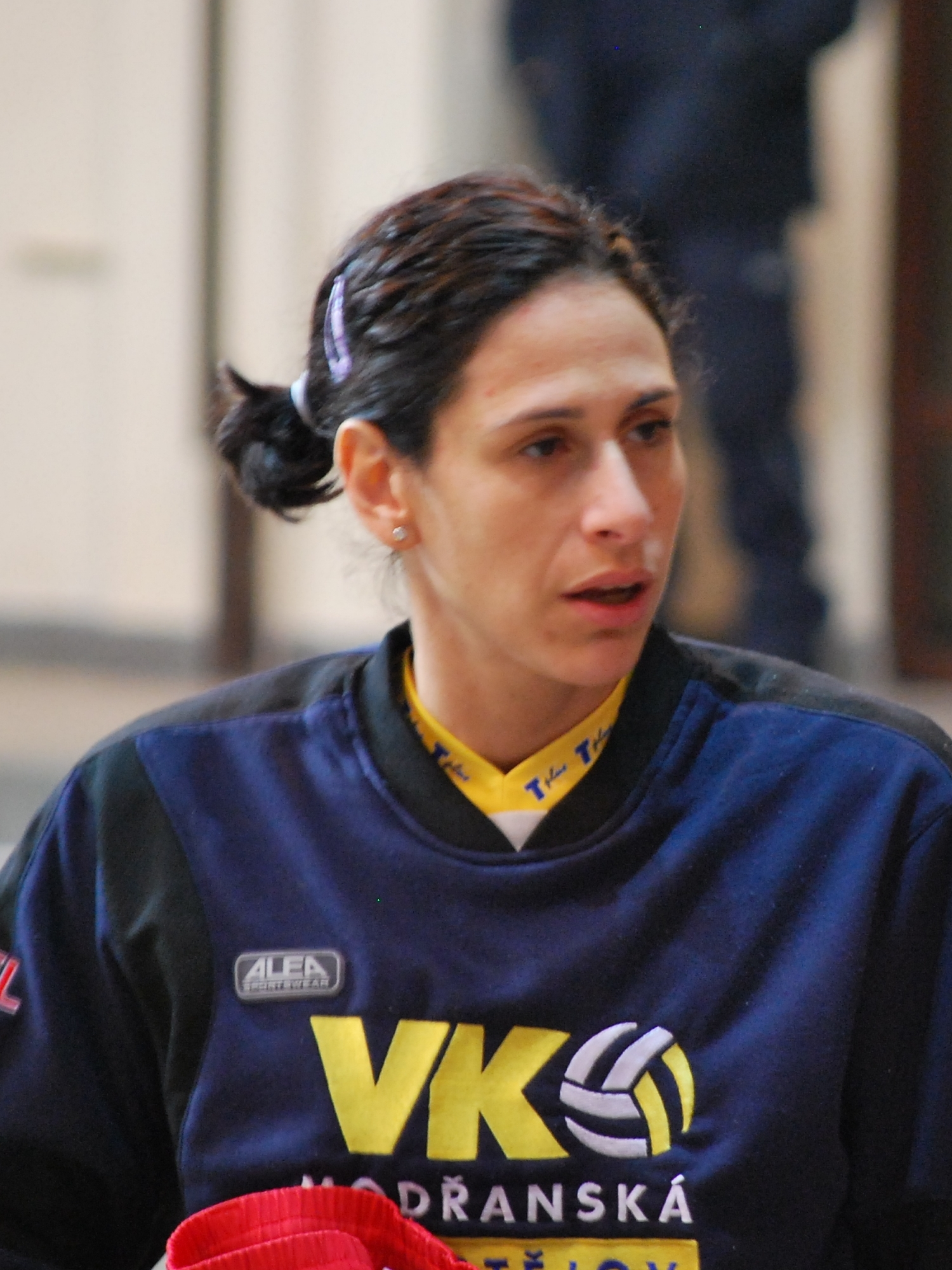

Personal information
- Nationality: Israeli
- Born: 2 September 1976 (age 50); Odesa, Ukrainian SSR, USSR

Volleyball information
- Position: right side hitter

National team
Israel

Tatiana Artmenko (Hebrew: טטיאנה ארטמנקו; born 2 September 1976) is an Israeli female former volleyball player, playing as a right side hitter. She was part of the Israel women's national volleyball team. She competed at the 2011 Women's European Volleyball Championship. On club level she played for Vk Prostějov. During 2017-2020 she was coach assistant for Israel women's national volleyball team young teams.
