= Regina Burchardt =

German volleyball player (born 1983)

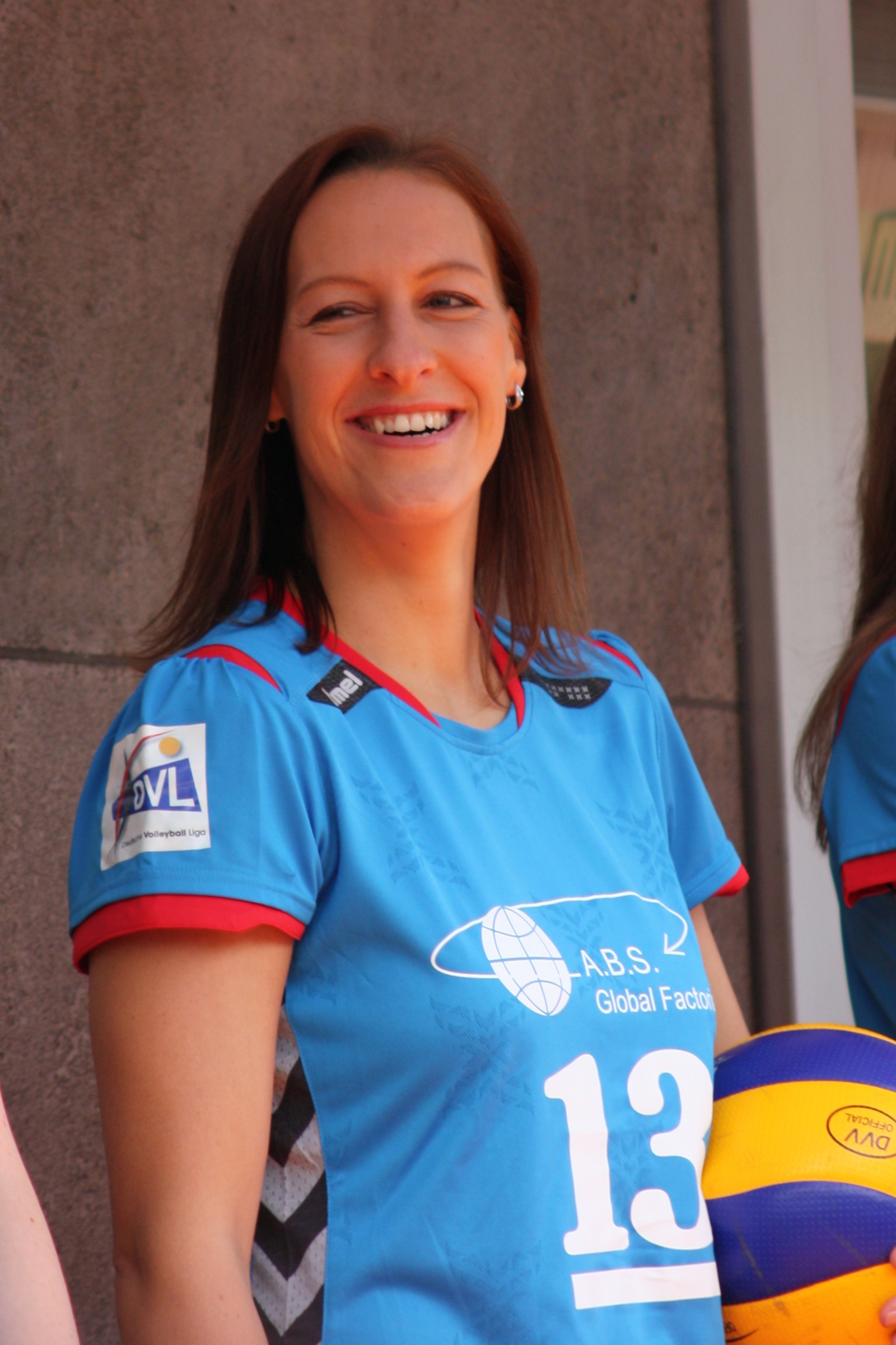
- Regina Burchardt, 2013

Personal information
- Nationality: German
- Born: 1 July 1983 (age 43)
- Height: 172 cm (68 in)

Volleyball information
- Position: right side hitter
- Number: 19 (national team)

Career
Years	Teams
2011	VC Wiesbaden

National team
2011	Germany

Regina Burchardt (born 1 July 1983) is a German female former volleyball player, playing as a right side hitter. She was part of the Germany women's national volleyball team.

She competed at the 2011 Women's European Volleyball Championship. On club level she played for VC Wiesbaden.
