= Ron Ponte =

Israeli volleyball player (born 1988)

Ron Ponte רון פונטה
Personal information
- Nationality: Israeli
- Born: 14 July 1988 (age 38)
- Height: 173 cm (68 in)
- Weight: 71 kg (157 lb)

Volleyball information
- Position: setter
- Number: 14 (national team)

National team
- Years: Team
- 2011: Israel

Ron Ponte (Hebrew: רון פונטה; born 14 July 1988) is an Israeli female former volleyball player, playing as a setter. She was part of the Israel women's national volleyball team for the KKTA Tel Aviv team. She was the Israeli National Champion in 2017–18.

She competed at the 2011 Women's European Volleyball Championship.

In the 2010 Euroleague, she placed third. She is a three-time national championship, a five-time cup holder. Ponte also played as a foreign player for the German First Division.
