= Anna Farhi =

Israeli volleyball player (born 1980)

Anna Farhi אנה פרחי

Personal information
- Nationality: Israeli
- Born: 1 March 1980 (age 46); Bulgaria
- Height: 189 cm (74 in)
- Weight: 70 kg (154 lb)

Volleyball information
- Position: Middle Blocker
- Number: 15 (national team)

National team
- 2011-2015
- Unknown
- Israel
- Bulgaria
- Last updated: 25 February 2017

Anna Farhi (Hebrew: אנה פרחי; born 1 March 1980) is an Israeli female former volleyball player, born in Bulgaria, who plays as a middle blocker. She was part of the Israel women's national volleyball team from 2011 to 2015. She competed at the 2011 and 2015 Women's European Volleyball Championships. She retired in 2017 after playing for Maccabi Even Yhooda.

== History ==
In her youth, Farhi played for Bulgaria's under-17 team before travelling to Switzerland at the age of 21. While playing an exhibition game in Switzerland, the coach of Israel's women's national volleyball team convinced her to come to Israel and play for their national team.
