= Adva Zinober =

Israeli volleyball player (born 1982)

Adva Zinober אדוה זינובר

Personal information
- Nationality: Israeli
- Born: 5 November 1982 (age 43)
- Height: 169 cm (67 in)
- Weight: 59 kg (130 lb)

Volleyball information
- Position: libero
- Number: 9 (national team)

National team
2011	Israel

Adva Zinober (Hebrew: אדוה זינובר; born 5 November 1982) is an Israeli female former volleyball player, playing as a libero. She was part of the Israel women's national volleyball team and played between 2017 and 2023 for Hapoel Ironi Kiryat Ata at Israeli Women's Volleyball League.

She competed at the 2011 Women's European Volleyball Championship, and 2013 Women's European Volleyball Championship.
