= Polina Arazi =

Israeli volleyball player (born 1978)

Polina Arazi פולינה ארזי

Personal information
- Nationality: Israeli
- Born: 18 February 1978 (age 48)
- Height: 187 cm (74 in)
- Weight: 72 kg (159 lb)

Volleyball information
- Position: outside hitter
- Number: 13 (national team)

National team
2011	Israel

Polina Arazi (Hebrew: פולינה ארזי; born 18 February 1978) is an Israeli female former volleyball player, playing as an outside hitter. She was part of the Israel women's national volleyball team and playerd for Maccabi Raanana in 2008-2009 Israeli Women's Volleyball League season.

She competed at the 2011 Women's European Volleyball Championship.
