= Anna Dovgopoliuk =

Ukrainian volleyball player (born 1985)

Personal information
- Nationality: Ukrainian
- Born: 11 October 1985 (age 41)
- Height: 188 cm (6 ft 2 in)
- Weight: 73 kg (161 lb)

Volleyball information
- Position: outside hitter

National team
2011	Ukraine

Anna Dovgopoliuk (born 11 October 1985) is a Ukrainian female former volleyball player, playing as an outside hitter. She was part of the Ukraine women's national volleyball team.

She competed at the 2011 Women's European Volleyball Championship.
