= Ivelina Monova =

Bulgarian volleyball player

Personal information
- Nationality: Bulgaria
- Born: 17 January 1986 (age 40); Ukraine
- Height: 1.73 m (5 ft 8 in)
- Weight: 58 kg (128 lb)
- Spike: 285 cm (112 in)
- Block: 280 cm (110 in)

Volleyball information
- Number: 12

Career
Years	Teams
2014	(Bulgaria) Maritza Plovdiv

Ivelina Monova (Bulgarian: Ивелина Монова) (born 17 January 1986) is a Bulgarian female volleyball player. She is a member of the Bulgaria women's national volleyball team and played for Maritza Plovdiv in 2014.

She was part of the Bulgarian national team at the 2014 FIVB Volleyball Women's World Championship in Italy. She competed at the 2009 Women's European Volleyball Championship, and at the 2011 Women's European Volleyball Championship. On club level she played for Maritza Plovdiv.

== Clubs ==
- (Bulgaria) Maritza Plovdiv (2014)
