= Sissoi Veliky =

Sissoi Veliky (Russian: Сисой Великий) may refer to:

- St. Sisoes the Great of Egypt, early Christian saint
- Sissoi Veliky (1788), Russian ship of the line
- Sissoi Veliky (1822), Russian ship of the line
- Sissoi Veliky (1849), Russian ship of the line
- Russian battleship Sissoi Veliky (1896), Russian battleship
