= Irinel Voicu =

Romanian footballer

Personal information
- Full name: Irinel Constantin Voicu
- Date of birth: 9 May 1977 (age 49)
- Place of birth: Târgovişte, Romania
- Height: 1.85 m (6 ft 1 in)
- Position: Defender

Team information
- Current team: Chindia Târgoviște U19 (head coach)

Youth career
- –1995: Oțelul Târgoviște

Senior career*
Years	Team	Apps	(Gls)
1995	Dinamo București	0	(0)
1996–1999	Chindia Târgovişte	63	(0)
1999–2000	Rocar București	15	(0)
2000	Fulgerul Bragadiru	4	(0)
2001	Rocar București	10	(0)
2001–2002	AEK București	10	(0)
2002–2005	Politehnica Timișoara	63	(6)
2005	Vaslui	6	(0)
2006–2007	Unirea Urziceni	13	(0)
2007–2008	Dacia Mioveni	12	(0)
2008	FC Snagov	9	(1)
2009	Voința Domnești		
2009–2011	FC Snagov	50	(2)
2011–2013	Voluntari		
Total		255	(9)

Managerial career
- 2017–2018: Chindia Târgoviște U19
- 2019–2022: Chindia Târgoviște (youth center director)
- 2022–2023: Chindia Târgoviște (assistant)
- 2023–: Chindia Târgoviște U19
- * Club domestic league appearances and goals

Irinel Constantin Voicu (born 9 May 1977) is a former Romanian footballer and currently a manager.

== Honours ==
=== Player ===
Oțelul Târgoviște

- Divizia B: 1995–96

Rocar București

- Cupa României: runner-up 2000–01

AEK București

- Divizia B: 2001–02
