= Velika =

Velika (Cyrillic: Велика; "great" (fem.) in South Slavic) may refer to:

== Places ==
- Velika (bishopric), a medieval bishopric associated with Clement of Ohrid
- Velika, Bosnia and Herzegovina, a village in Derventa
- Velika, Bulgaria, a village near Tsarevo, in Burgas Province
- Velika, Croatia, a village and municipality in Požega-Slavonia County
- Velika, Larissa, a beach village in Thessaly, Greece
- Velika, Montenegro, a village in Plav
- Velika (Česma), a river in Croatia, right tributary of Česma
- Velika Jamnička, a village near Pisarovina, Croatia
- Velika Petrovagorska, a village near Lobor, Croatia
- Velika Veternička, a village near Novi Golubovec, Croatia
- Kraljeva Velika, a village near Lipovljani, Croatia
- Lovrečka Velika, a village near Vrbovec, Croatia
- Srednja Velika, a village near Preseka, Croatia
- Donja Velika, Zagreb County, a village near Preseka
- Donja Velika, Koprivnica-Križevci County, a village near Sokolovac, Croatia
- Gornja Velika, Zagreb County, a village near Preseka
- Gornja Velika, Koprivnica-Križevci County, a village near Sokolovac

== Other uses ==
- Velika Begovica, 19th-century Serbian rebel

== See also ==
- Veliky (disambiguation)
