= Adrian Aciobăniței =

Romanian volleyball player (born 1997)

Personal information
- Full name: Adrian Robert Aciobăniței
- Born: 24 August 1997 (age 29); Fălticeni, Romania
- Height: 1.94 m (6 ft 4 in)
- Weight: 97 kg (214 lb)
- Spike: 346 cm (136 in)
- Block: 319 cm (126 in)

Volleyball information
- Position: Outside hitter
- Current club: Panathinaikos

Career
Years	Teams
2012–2015; 2015–2016; 2016–2018; 2018–2019; 2019–2021; 2021–2023; 2023–2024; 2024–2025; 2025–	Tomis Constanța; VfB Friedrichshafen; United Volleys Rhein-Main; VfB Friedrichshafen; AS Cannes; Chaumont VB 52; Skra Bełchatów; Alanya Belediyespor; Panathinaikos

National team
Romania

Adrian Robert Aciobăniței (born 24 August 1997) is a Romanian professional volleyball player who plays as an outside hitter for Panathinaikos and the Romania national team.

== Career ==
Aciobăniței made his debut in professional volleyball at the age of 14, joining Tomis Constanța in his native country. The Romanian Volleyball Federation (FRV) named him the best Romanian male volleyball player in both 2020 and 2022.

== Honours ==
=== Club ===
- Domestic
  - 2012–13 Romanian Cup, with Tomis Constanța
  - 2012–13 Romanian Championship, with Tomis Constanța
  - 2013–14 Romanian Cup, with Tomis Constanța
  - 2013–14 Romanian Championship, with Tomis Constanța
  - 2014–15 Romanian Championship, with Tomis Constanța
  - 2018–19 German SuperCup, with VfB Friedrichshafen
  - 2018–19 German Cup, with VfB Friedrichshafen
  - 2020–21 French Championship, with AS Cannes
  - 2021–22 French SuperCup, with Chaumont VB 52
  - 2021–22 French Cup, with Chaumont VB 52
