= Velikoye, Kubenskoye Rural Settlement, Vologodsky District, Vologda Oblast =

Velikoye Великое
- Village
- Location within Vologda Oblast Location within Russia
- Coordinates: 59°23′N 39°29′E
- Country: Russia
- Region: Vologda Oblast
- District: Vologodsky District
- Time zone: UTC+3:00

Velikoye (Russian: Великое) is a rural locality (a village) in Kubenskoye Rural Settlement, Vologodsky District, Vologda Oblast, Russia. The population was 30 as of 2002.

== Geography ==
The distance to Vologda is 45 km, to Kubenskoye is 11 km. Tatarovo, Yelizarovo, Zabolotnoye are the nearest rural localities.
