= Antonija Kaleb =

Croatian volleyball player (born 1986)

Personal information
- Nationality: Croatian
- Born: 2 April 1986 (age 40); Zadar, SFR Yugoslavia
- Height: 1.88 m (6 ft 2 in)
- Weight: 71 kg (157 lb)
- Spike: 305 cm (120 in)
- Block: 289 cm (114 in)

Volleyball information
- Position: Middle blocker

Career
Years	Teams
2015	Jakarta BNI 46

National team
2003–2014	Croatia

Antonija Kaleb (born 2 April 1986) is a Croatian volleyball player. She is a member of the Croatia women's national volleyball team.

She was part of the Croatian national team at the 2014 FIVB Volleyball Women's World Championship in Italy, and played for Jakarta BNI 46 in 2014.

== Clubs ==
- (Croatia) OK Pula (2001–2006)
- (Croatia) OK Rijeka (2006–2008)
- (Belgium) Dauphines Charleroi (2008–2009)
- (Switzerland) Volero Zurich (2009)
- (Romania) Universitate Craiova (2009–2010)
- (Turkey) Karsiyaka S.K. (2010–2011)
- (France) Hainaut Volley (2011–2013)
- (Indonesia) Jakarta BNI 46 (2013–2015)
