= Adina Salaoru =

Romanian volleyball player (born 1989)

Personal information
- Nationality: Romanian
- Born: 5 August 1989 (age 37); Miercurea Ciuc, Romania
- Height: 1.84 m (6 ft 0 in)

Volleyball information
- Position: Outside hitter
- Current club: CSM București
- Number: 2

Career
Years	Teams
2006–2013	CSM Medicina Târgu Mureș
2013–2018	CSM Volei Alba Blaj
2018–	CSM București

National team
2008–	Romania

Adina Salaoru (born 5 August 1989) is a Romanian volleyball player who plays for CSM București and the Romania national team.

She competed at the 2015 Women's European Volleyball Championship.

She was given the award of Cetățean de onoare ("Honorary Citizen") of the city of Blaj in 2017.

== Achievements ==
- Divizia A1:
  - Winner (3): 2015, 2016, 2017
  - Silver Medalist: 2018
- Cupa României :
  - Winner (1): 2017
  - Finalist: 2018
- Supercupa României :
  - Finalist: 2016
- EHF Champions League:
  - Finalist: 2018

== Individual awards ==
- Romanian Volleyball Player of the Year: 2017
