= Alexandra Dascalu =

French volleyball player (born 1991)

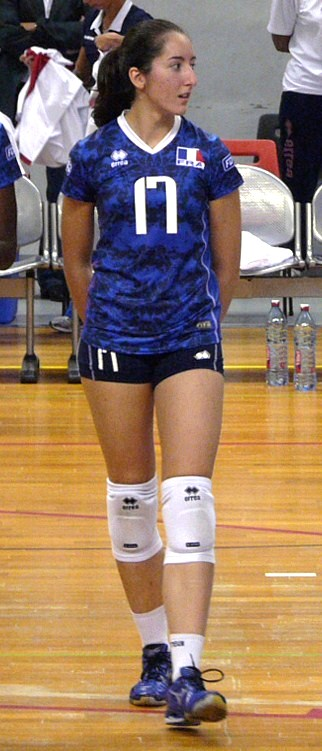
- Dascalu playing for France in 2011

Personal information
- Full name: Alexandra Alina Dascalu
- Nationality: French
- Born: 17 April 1991 (age 35); Palma de Mallorca, Spain
- Height: 1.84 m (6 ft 0 in)
- Spike: 311 cm (122 in)
- Block: 299 cm (118 in)

Volleyball information
- Position: right side hitter
- Number: 17 (national team)

Career
Years	Teams
2011	fr:Saint-Cloud Paris Stade français

National team
2011-	France

Alexandra Alina Dăscalu (born 17 April 1991) is a French female volleyball player who currently plays for Italian club Baronissi, as a right side hitter. She is also a member of the France women's national volleyball team. Her father, Pompiliu, is a retired volleyballer and current coach in France. Dăscalu's younger sister, Silvana, is also a volleyball player.

She competed at the 2011 Women's European Volleyball Championship.

== Clubs ==
- (France) Nantes Volley (2010–2013)
- (France) Vannes Volley (2013–2015)
- (France) Saint-Cloud Paris Stade français (2015–2018)
- (Italy) Baronissi Volley (2018–present)

== Sources ==
- "Alexandra Dascalu - Volleyball - Scoresway - Results, fixtures, tables and statistics". Scoresway. Archived from the original on 27 March 2017.
- "Un œil sur les Dascalu - Volleyball - Eurosport". Eurosport.fr. 19 January 2016.
- "Le Télégramme - Volley - DEF/ Vannes - Chamalières, demain (19 h). Dascalu, tel père, telle fille". Letelegramme.fr.
- "Cev League Stock Photos and Pictures". Getty Images.
