= Velikoye, Prilukskoye Rural Settlement, Vologodsky District, Vologda Oblast =

Velikoye Великое
- Village
- Location within Vologda Oblast Location within Russia
- Coordinates: 59°19′N 39°55′E
- Country: Russia
- Region: Vologda Oblast
- District: Vologodsky District
- Time zone: UTC+3:00

Velikoye (Russian: Великое) is a rural locality (a village) in Prilukskoye Rural Settlement, Vologodsky District, Vologda Oblast, Russia. The population was 5 as of 2002.

== Geography ==
The distance to Vologda is 23 km, to Dorozhnoye is 8 km. Zaonikiyevo, Semyonkovo-2, Borilovo-2, Arkhipovo are the nearest rural localities.
