= Peter the Great (disambiguation) =

Peter the Great (Пётр Великий, Petr Veliky) (1672–1725) was a Russian monarch.

Peter the Great may also refer to:

== Monarchs ==
- Peter III of Aragon (1239–1285)

== Ships ==
- Russian ironclad Petr Veliky, an 1872 ironclad turret ship
- Russian battlecruiser Pyotr Velikiy, commissioned in 1998
- SS Pyotr Velikiy, a Soviet passenger-ship in service 1946–47 and 1949–73

== Film and television ==
- Peter the Great (1910 film), a Russian short film
- Peter the Great (1922 film), a German silent historical film
- Peter the Great (1937 film), a Soviet two-part historical biographical film
- Peter the Great (miniseries), an American television mini-series

== Other uses ==
- Peter the Great (horse), an American Standardbred horse
- Pierre le Grand (pirate) ('Peter the Great'), a 17th-century buccaneer
- Peter the Great (Fabergé egg), a jewelled Easter egg
