= Gabriela Koeva =

Bulgarian volleyball player (born 1989)

Personal information
- Born: July 25, 1989 (age 37); Pleven, Bulgaria
- Height: 1.86 m (6 ft 1 in)
- Weight: 74 kg (163 lb)
- Spike: 310 cm (122 in)
- Block: 295 cm (116 in)

Volleyball information
- Position: Middle Blocker
- Current club: (Azerbaijan) Telekom Baku

Career
Years	Teams
2002-06; 2007-09; 2009-11; 2011-12; 2012-15; 2015-16; 2016-17	(Bulgaria) Spartak'96 Pleven (Bulgaria) VC CSKA Sofia (Switzerland) Voléro Zürich (Italy) Minerva Volley Pavia (Turkey) Beşiktaş Women's Volleyball (Azerbaijan) Telekom Baku (Azerbaijan) Telekom Baku

National team
2007-	Bulgaria women's national volleyball team
Honours
Women's volleyball
Representing Bulgaria
European League
Bronze medal – third place	2011 Istanbul	Team

Gabriela Koeva (Bulgarian: Габриела Коева, born 25 July 1989 in Pleven) is a Bulgarian female volleyball player. The 1.86 m (6 ft 1 in) middle blocker at 74 kg (163 lb) is since 2007 a member of the Bulgaria women's national volleyball team.

After playing for VC CSKA Sofia in her home country between 2007 and 2009, she transferred to Voléro Zürich in Switzerland, where she played for two seasons until 2011. In the 2011-12 season, Koeva was with Minerva Volley Pavia in Italy. In November 2012, she signed for Beşiktaş Women's Volleyball.

Currently (season 2016-2017) Gabriela is playing her second season in the Azerbaijan championship, wearing the jersey of Telekom Baku.

== Achievements ==
- 2011 Women's European Volleyball League - Bulgarian national team (bronze)
- Swiss Cup
- Championship of Switzerland
