= Biljana Gligorović =

Croatian volleyball player (born 1982)

Personal information
- Nickname: Bibi
- Nationality: Croatian
- Born: 31 January 1982 (age 44); Pula, Croatia
- Hometown: Athens
- Height: 1.85 m (6 ft 1 in)
- Weight: 65 kg (143 lb)
- Spike: 305 cm (120 in)
- Block: 287 cm (113 in)

Volleyball information
- Position: Setter
- Current club: G.S.Ilioupoly
- Number: 1

Career
Years	Teams
1997-1998; 1998-2000; 2000-2001; 2001-2002; 2002-2003; 2003-2005; 2005-2006; 2006-2007; 2007-2008; 2008-2009; 2009-2010; 2010-2011; 2011-2012; 2012-2013; 2013-2014; 2015-2017; 2017-2018; 2018-2019	(Croatia) Ντουμπρόβνικ (Croatia) Ριέκα (Italy) Ρέτζιο Καλάμπρια (Italy) Βόλει Ιμόλα (Russia) Φακέλ Νόβι Ουρενγκόι (Italy) Σαντεράμο Σπορτ (Italy) Μέγκιους Βόλει Κλαμπ (Italy) Αλτάμουρα Βόλει (Italy) Τσιέρι Βόλει (Greece) Ολυμπιακός Πειραιώς (Greece) Απολλώνιος (Romania) Ντιναμό Βουκουρεστίου (Azerbaijan) ΒΚ Μπακού (Greece) Ηρακλής Κηφισιάς (Greece) Α.Ο. Βριλήσσια (Greece) Ηλιούπολη (Greece) Άρης (Greece) Ηλιούπολη

National team
1997-2012 (Croatia) 180 participation	Croatia
Medal record
Women's volleyball
Representing Croatia
Mediterranean Games
Bronze medal – third place	2009 Pescara	Team

Biljana Gligorović (born 31 January 1982) is a Croatian former professional international volleyball player, who played as setter. During her career so far she has played in the championships of Italy, Russia, Greece, Romania and Azerbaijan. She competed for Croatia at the 2000 Summer Olympics.

Born in Croatia, has been in Italy since she was very young and signed her first professional contract with Italian Reggio Calabria. In the first year with Calabria, Gligorovic managed to win two titles, namely the Italian Super Cup (2000) and the Italian Championship (2001). After her successful pass from the Calabria, Gligorovic continued to compete in teams in Italy for the next seven years, namely until 2008. The teams that he played during the seven years were Volley Imola, Santeram Sport, Megui Volley Club, Altemura Volley and Chieri Volley. In 2008 she decided to leave Italy and travel to Greece on behalf of Olympic Piraeus, The Piraeus team stayed for a year without a title. However, he managed to conquer the second place in the final score of the Greek championship. The next season she continued to compete in Greece by wearing Apollonius shirt. In 2010, Biljana Gligorovic decided to move to Romania on behalf of Dynamo Bucharest. She remained in the Bucharest team for a year but did not manage to win a title. After the end of the 2010–11 season, Gligorovic moved to Baku, a team in Azerbaijan, where he also stayed for a year. With the Baku team taking third place in the country championship and the bronze medal at the Challenge Cup In 2012 she decided to return to Greece on behalf of Hercules Kifissias. Kifissia's team stayed for a year as they moved to Vrilissia in the summer of 2013. In 2015 she competed in the team of Ilioupoli for two years. In 2017 she moves on behalf of ARIS in Thessaloniki where they reach the final of the championship. In 2018 she returns to Ilioupolis where she closes her career.
