= Velikoye, Kaduysky District, Vologda Oblast =

Velikoye Великое
- Selo
- Location within Vologda Oblast Location within Russia
- Coordinates: 59°31′N 37°01′E
- Country: Russia
- Region: Vologda Oblast
- District: Kaduysky District
- Time zone: UTC+3:00

Velikoye (Russian: Великое) is a rural locality (a selo) in Nikolskoye Rural Settlement, Kaduysky District, Vologda Oblast, Russia. The population was 126 as of 2002. There are 6 streets.

== Geography ==
Velikoye is located 46 km north of Kaduy (the district's administrative centre) by road. Pochinok is the nearest rural locality.
