= Anna Velikiy =

Soviet Uzbek-born Israeli volleyball player (born 1982)

Anna Velikiy Анна Великий
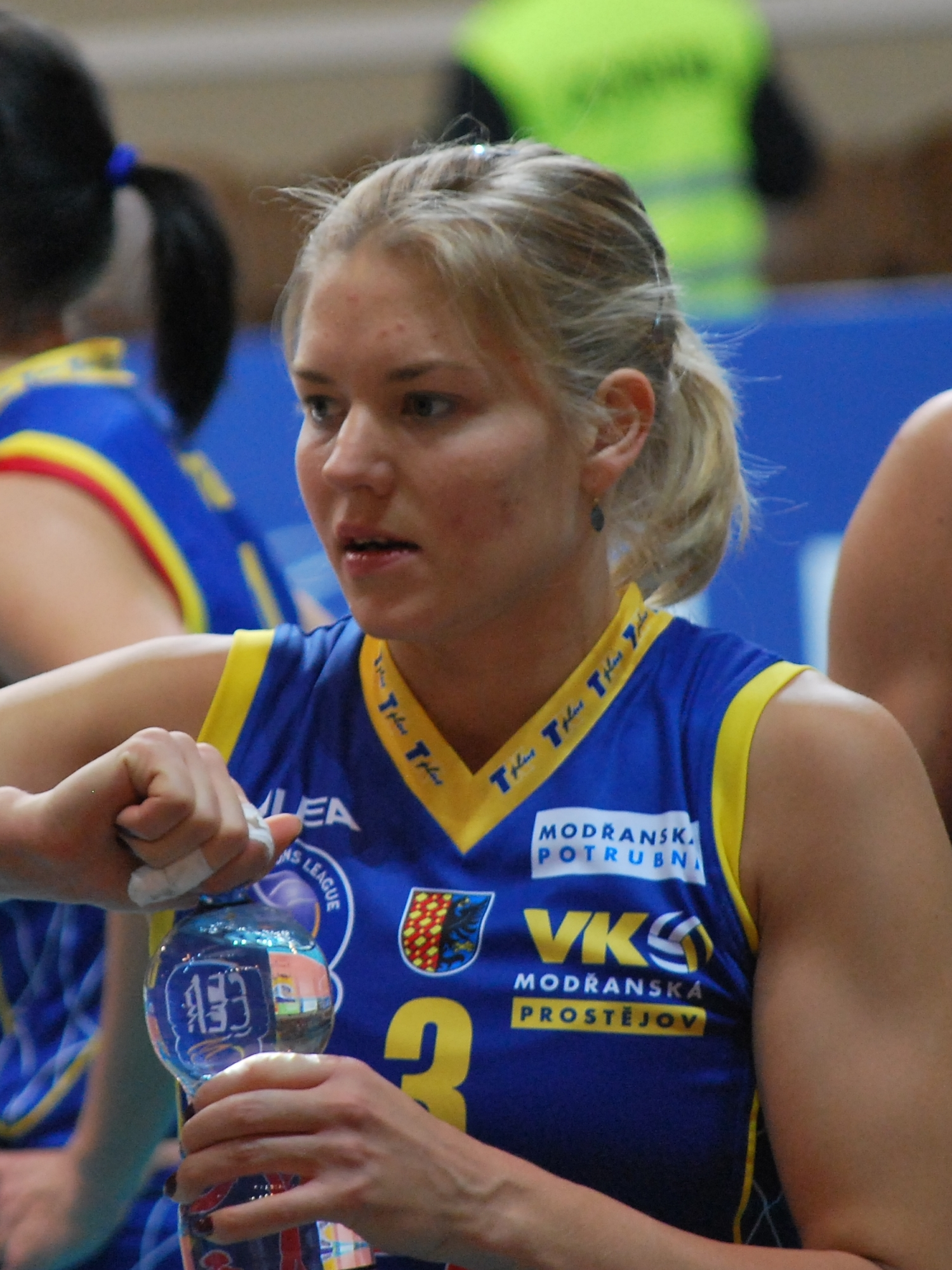
- Velikiy playing for VK Prostějov in 2010

Personal information
- Full name: Anya Velikiy
- Nickname: Anna
- Nationality: Israeli
- Born: 10 December 1982 (age 43) Soviet Uzbekistan, USSR
- Height: 179 cm (70 in)
- Weight: 69 kg (152 lb)

Volleyball information
- Position: Right side hitter
- Number: 3 (national team)

Career
- Years: Team
- 2011: VK Prostějov

National team
- Years: Team
- 2011: Israel

Anya "Anna" Velikiy (Russian: Аня "Анна" Великий, Hebrew: אניה "אנה" וליקי; born December 10, 1982) is a Soviet Uzbek-born Israeli female former volleyball player, who played as a right side hitter. She captained the Israel women's national volleyball team.

She competed at the 2011 Women's European Volleyball Championship.

She immigrated to Israel from Uzbekistan in 2006.

She played for Czech club VK Prostějov. She also played for Israeli volleyball club Hapoel Kfar Saba from 2015 to 2023 and for Hapoel Ironi Kiryat Ata in 2012–2014.
