= Laurențiu Lică =

Romanian footballer

Personal information
- Date of birth: 28 October 1975 (age 51)
- Position: Midfielder

Senior career*
Years	Team	Apps	(Gls)
1993–1995	Dinamo București		
1995–1997	Gloria Bistrița		
1997–1999	DSV Leoben		
1999–2000	Rocar București		
2000	Torpedo-MAZ Minsk	17	(4)
2003–2004	Unirea Alba Iulia		
- * Club domestic league appearances and goals

Laurențiu Lică (born 28 October 1975) is a retired Romanian football midfielder.
