= Milagros Collar =

Spanish volleyball player (born 1988)

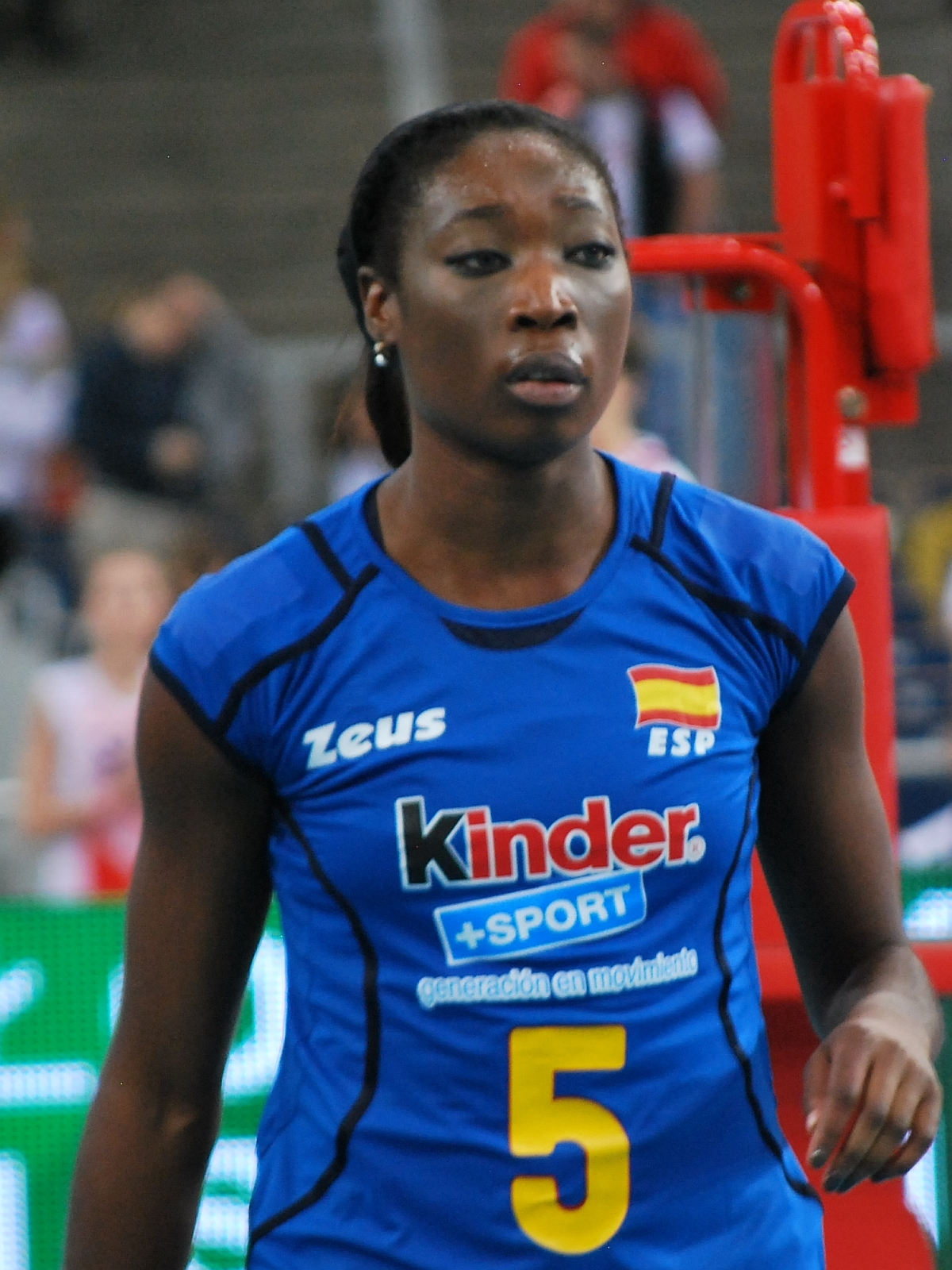
- Collar playing for Spain at the 2014 FIVB Volleyball Women's World Championship qualification

Personal information
- Full name: Milagros Catalina Collar Nguema
- Nickname: Mila
- Nationality: Spanish
- Born: 15 April 1988 (age 38); Madrid, Spain
- Height: 1.87 m (6 ft 2 in)
- Weight: 77 kg (170 lb)
- Spike: 300 cm (118 in)
- Block: 290 cm (114 in)

Volleyball information
- Position: Opposite
- Current club: PAOK

Career
Years	Teams
2004–2010	JAV Olímpico
2010–2011	CAV Murcia 2005
2011–2012	Pallavolo Pontecagnano
2012–2013	Le Cannet-Rocheville
2013–2014	Alba Blaj
2014–2015	Dinamo București
2015–2018	Târgoviște
2018	Nilüfer Belediyespor
2018–2019	Suwon Hyundai E&C
2019	Foton Tornadoes
2019–	Suwon Hyundai E&C

National team
2006–2018	Spain

Milagros Catalina Collar Nguema (born 15 April 1988) is a Spanish volleyball player, playing as an Opposite hitter (she formerly played as a Middle Blocker). She has been a member of the Spain women's national volleyball team. She is of Equatorial Guinean descent.
