= Cristina Cazacu =

Romanian volleyball player (born 1994)

Cristina Ana Cazacu

Personal information
- Nationality: Romania
- Born: 21 July 1994 (age 32); Tulcea
- Height: 1.85 m (6 ft 1 in)
- Weight: 72 kg (159 lb)

Volleyball information
- Position: Outside hitter
- Current club: CS Medgidia
- Number: 12 & 7 (club and national team)

National team
2011	Romania
- Last updated: 7 January 2017

Cristina Ana Cazacu (born 21 July 1994) is a Romanian female volleyball player, playing as a right side hitter. She was part of the Romania women's national volleyball team.

She competed at the 2011 Women's European Volleyball Championship. On club level she plays for CS Știința Bacău.

== Clubs ==
- (Romania) 2004 Tomis Constanța (2009–2013)
- (Romania) CSM București (2013–2015)
- (Romania) CS Știința Bacău (2015–2020)
- (Romania) CS Medgidia (2020–present)
