= Ana Correa =

Spanish volleyball player (born 1985)

Personal information
- Full name: Ana Mirtha Correa
- Nationality: Spanish
- Born: 19 January 1985 (age 41)
- Height: 187 cm (6 ft 2 in)

Volleyball information
- Position: central
- Number: 6 (national team)

Career
Years	Teams
2013	(France) Béziers Volley

National team
2013	Spain

Ana Mirtha Correa (born 19 January 1985) is a Spanish volleyball player, playing as a central. She is part of the Spain women's national volleyball team.

She competed at the 2013 Women's European Volleyball Championship. On club level she played for Béziers Volley.
