= Nneka Onyejekwe =

Romanian volleyball player (born 1989)

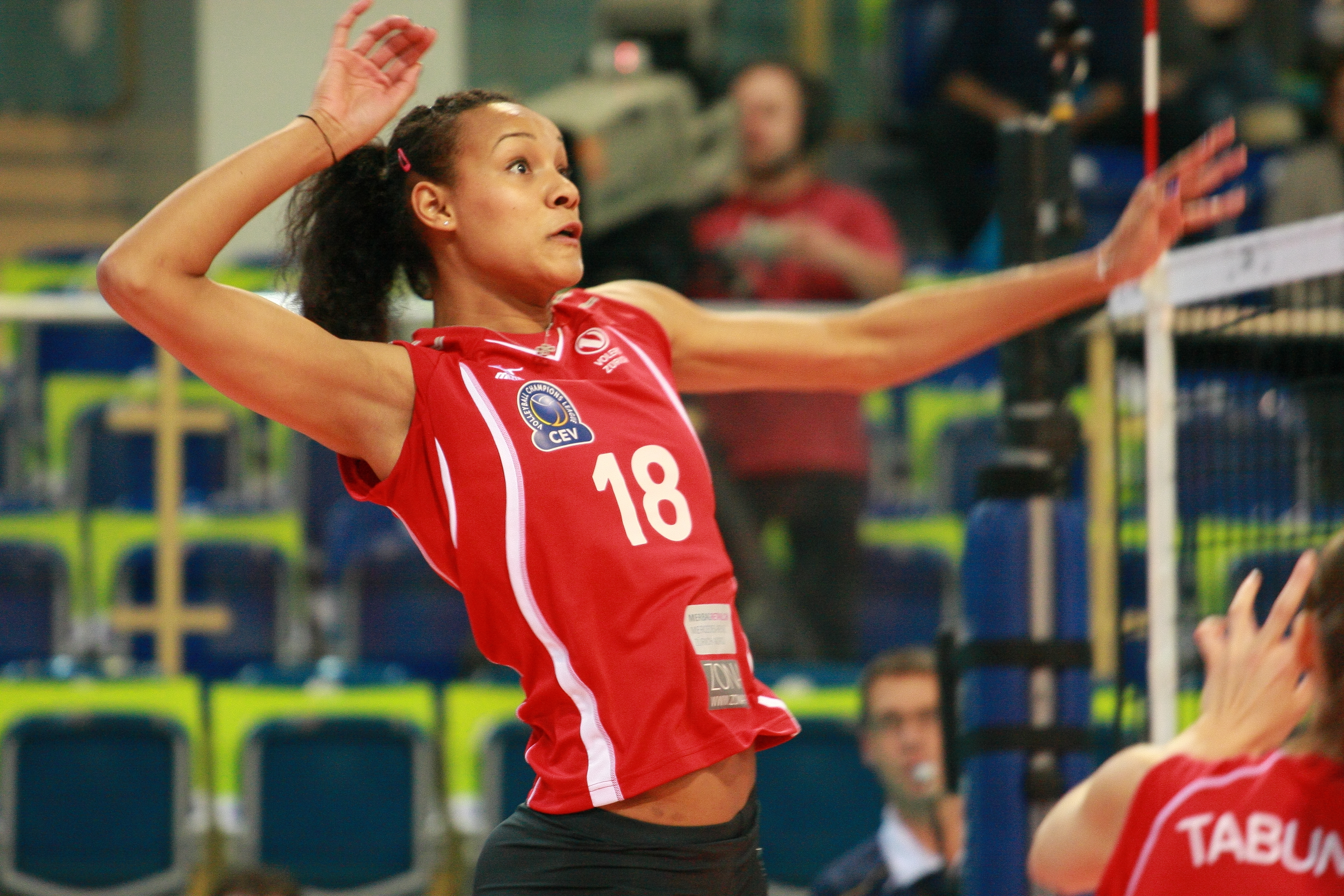
- Onyejekwe in 2011

Personal information
- Full name: Nneka Obiamaka Onyejekwe
- Nationality: (Romania) Romanian
- Born: 18 August 1989 (age 37); Hațeg, Romania
- Height: 1.89 m (6 ft 2 in)
- Weight: 75 kg (165 lb)
- Spike: 319 cm (126 in)
- Block: 301 cm (119 in)

Volleyball information
- Position: Middle blocker
- Current club: CS DINAMO
- Number: 18

Career
Years	Teams
2007–2010; 2010–2014; 2014–2015; 2015–2016; 2016–	Metal Galați; Voléro Zürich; RC Cannes; Dresdner SC; CS Volei Alba-Blaj

National team
2006–	Romania
Honours
Top Volley International
Gold medal – first place	2010 Basel	Team

Nneka Obiamaka Onyejekwe (born 18 August 1989 in Hațeg) is a Romanian professional volleyball player who played as a middle blocker for CS Volei Alba-Blaj and now plays for Dinamo Bucharest and the Romania national team.

She was born in Hațeg to a Romanian mother and Nigerian father, both intellectuals, and was raised in Cluj-Napoca. One of her brothers, Chike, plays handball professionally.

== Honours ==
=== Clubs ===
- 2011, 2012, 2013 Swiss Championship – Champion, with Voléro Zürich
- 2011, 2012, 2013 Swiss Cup – Champion, with Voléro Zürich
- 2010, 2011 Swiss Super Cup – Champion, with Voléro Zürich
- 2007, 2008, 2009, 2010 Romanian Championship – Champion, with Metal Galați
- 2007, 2008, 2009 Romanian Cup – Champion, with Metal Galați
- 2017–18 CEV Champions League - Runner-Up, with CSM Volei Alba Blaj

== Individual awards ==
- 2017–18 CEV Champions League "Best Middle Blocker"
- 2017 Romanian Volleyball Player of the Year
- 2018 Romanian Volleyball Player of the Year

== See also ==
- Romania women's national volleyball team

Awards
Preceded by (Serbia) Milena Rašić (United States) Rachael Adams	Best Middle Blocker of CEV Champions League; 2017–2018 ex aequo (Serbia) Milena Rašić	Succeeded by TBD
