= Kristýna Pastulová =

Czech volleyball player (born 1985)

Personal information
- Full name: Kristýna Pastulová
- Born: October 22, 1985; Czech Republic
- Height: 1.97 m (6 ft 6 in)
- Weight: 80 kg (180 lb)
- Spike: 310 cm (122 in)
- Block: 302 cm (119 in)

Kristýna Pastulová (born October 22, 1985) is a volleyball player from the Czech Republic. She represented the Czech Republic national team at the 2009 Women's European Volleyball Championship.

== Clubs ==
| Club | Country | From | To |
|---|---|---|---|
| SVS Post Schwechat | Austria | 2007–2008 | |
