= Kraljev Vrh, Preseka =

Coordinates: 45°57′00″N 16°25′12″E

Kraljev Vrh
- Village
- Interactive map of Kraljev Vrh
- Country: Croatia
- County: Zagreb County

Area
  - Total: 2.6 km^{2} (1.0 sq mi)

Population (2021)
  - Total: 68
  - Density: 26/km^{2} (68/sq mi)
- Time zone: UTC+1 (CET)
  - Summer (DST): UTC+2 (CEST)

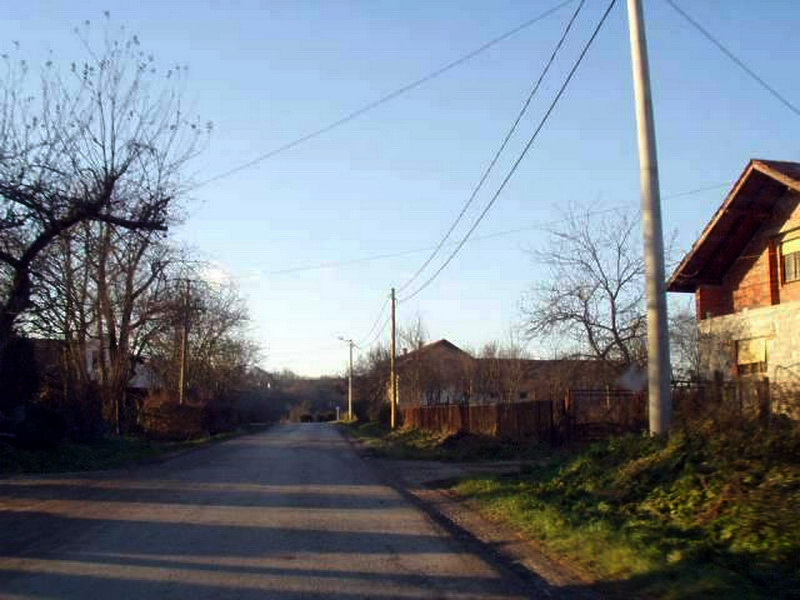
Kraljev Vrh

Kraljev Vrh is a village in Croatia.
