= Israeli Women's Volleyball League =

- Current season, competition or edition: 2019–20 Israeli Women's Volleyball League
- Sport: Volleyball
- Founded: 1960
- First season: 1961
- Administrator: IVA
- No. of teams: 10 (2019–20)
- Country: Israel
- Continent: Asia Following CEV
- Level on pyramid: 1
- Relegation to: 2nd League
- Domestic cups: Israeli Cup; Israeli Super Cup
- International cups: CEV Champions League; CEV Cup; CEV Challenge Cup
- Website: http://www.iva.org.il/

The Israeli Women's Volleyball First League is an important Israeli women's volleyball competition organized by the Israeli Volleyball Association ( איגוד הכדורעף בישראל, IVA ), it was established in 1960.

== History ==
In the 2018/19 season of the Israeli Women's Volleyball League 10 teams has participated in the regular season : "Maccabi (Haifa), Hapoel (Kfar Sava), Maccabi (Raanana), KK (Tel Aviv), Hapoel Irony (Kiryat Ata), Menashe-Hadera (Emek-Hefer), Academy. (Netanya), Maccabi (Nazareth), Maccabi (Hodh-ha-Sharon), ASA Ben-Gurion (Beer Sheva). The championship title was won for the second time in a row by Maccabi (Haifa), who won the final series beating Hapoel (Kfar Sava) 3-0 (3:1, 3:1, 3:1). The 3rd place went to Maccabi (Raanana).

== Winners list ==
Years	Champions
1961	Hapoel Ein Shemer
1962	Hapoel Naaman
1963	Hapoel Kfar Masaryk
1964	Hapoel Kfar Masaryk
1965	Hapoel Kfar Masaryk
1966	Hapoel Hampil
1967	Hapoel Hampil
1968	Hapoel Hampil
1969	Hapoel Hampil
1970	Hapoel Hampil
1971	Hapoel Ein Hamifratz
1972	Hapoel Hampil
1973	Hapoel Hampil
1974	Hapoel HaOgen
1975	Hapoel Naaman
1976	Hapoel Naaman
1977	Hapoel Naaman
1978	Hapoel Merhavia
1979	Hapoel Naaman
1980	Hapoel Merhavia
1981	Hapoel Merhavia
1982	Hapoel Merhavia

Years	Champions
1983	Hapoel Naaman
1984	Hapoel Naaman
1985	Hapoel Naaman
1986	Hapoel Naaman
1987	Hapoel Bat Yam
1988	Hapoel Bat Yam
1989	Hapoel Mateh Asher
1990	Hapoel Mateh Asher
1991	Hapoel Bat Yam
1992	Hapoel Mate Asher
1993	Hapoel Mateh Asher
1994	Hapoel Mateh Asher
1995	Hapoel Mateh Asher
1996	Hapoel Kiryat-Yam/Kiryat Haïm
1997	Hapoel Emek Hefer
1998	Hapoel Kiryat-Yam/Kiryat Haïm
1999	Hapoel Kiryat-Yam/Kiryat Haïm
2000	Hapoel Ironi Kiryat Ata
2001	Hapoel Ironi Kiryat Ata
2002	Hapoel Ironi Kiryat Ata
2003	Hapoel Ironi Kiryat Ata
2004	Hapoel Ironi Kiryat Ata

Years	Champions
2005	Davshanim Raanana
2006	Hapoel Ironi Kiryat Ata
2007	Hapoel Ironi Kiryat Ata
2008	Hapoel Ironi Kiryat Ata
2009	LK Raanana
2010	Hapoel Ironi Kiryat Ata
2011	Raanana Volleyball Club
2012	Hapoel Ironi Kiryat Ata
2013	Hapoel Ironi Kiryat Ata
2014	Hapoel Ironi Kiryat Ata
2015	Hapoel Kfar Saba
2016	Maccabi Haifa
2017	Hapoel Kfar Saba
2018	Maccabi Haifa
2019	Maccabi Haifa
2021	Hapoel Kfar Saba
2022	Maccabi Haifa
