= Israel women's national volleyball team =

Women's national volleyball team representing Israel

Israel
- Association: Israel Volleyball Association
- Confederation: CEV
- Head coach: Anna Velikiy
- FIVB ranking: 59 ▼1 (24 May 2026)

Uniforms
Home	Away

Summer Olympics
- Appearances: 0

World Championship
- Appearances: 1 (First in 1956)
- Best result: 14th

European Championship
- Appearances: 3 (First in 1967)
- Best result: 8th
- www.iva.org.il (in Hebrew)

The Israel women's national volleyball team participates in international volleyball competitions and friendly matches. It is governed by the Israel Volleyball Association (IVA). As in any other sports, even though Israel is geographically located in Asia, it competes in European (CEV) competitions. Its best result so far was a fourth place, in the 2010 European League, in Turkey. On September 11, 2010, after losing the first leg of the repechage against Belarus side by 3:2, and beating them by 3:1 at home, the team qualified for the 2011 European Championship after thirty nine years of absence on this competition.

== History ==
In the beginning of the State of Israel, volleyball was one of the sports with regular contests, including women's championships. But because of the 1947–1949 Palestine war, like most of the Israeli sports, volleyball was suspended, in order to help the army in the battlefield.

The first time Israel women's national team participated in a prestigious competition, was the 1956 World Championship, in France. The squad was seeded in a group along with the Soviet Union, United States and Luxembourg. Israel finished third in the group, and then went on to dispute from 11th to 17th places, where it got a final 14th, whereas Brazil finished 11th and the Soviet Union claimed the world championship.

In 1967, the Israeli national team celebrated her first European Championship. The tournament was held in Istanbul, Turkey, and the team played in the group stages, finishing second, after Turkey and before Sweden and Bulgaria. The next stage, the final round, had the top eight teams in the tournament. There, Israel has achieved two wins and seven losses and finished eighth in the final rankings.

Four years later, in 1971, the Israeli national team again reached the European Championship finals tournament. The tournament was held in Italy, where the team played the preliminary round, reaching the second place in its group, after Hungary and before England. This second place led to the 7th–12th spots placement games. Israel has achieved one win and suffered four losses in its last appearance on the European championship tournament, finishing 11th.

=== Project Selinger ===
Israeli women's national team in recent years has become a success model for imitation in other Israeli sports. Since the return of Dr. Arie Selinger to the Israeli coach's position, the Israeli team was dubbed "Project Selinger." The project was launched in the summer of 2007 with the goal of qualifying for the London 2012 Olympics. Special daily trainings were made for the evolution of the team.

In the spring of 2010, the Israeli team played in 2011 European Championship qualifier in Group C along with the sides of Ukraine, United Kingdom and Slovakia. The first two stages, when Israel played Ukraine and Great Britain, finished in second place, with four wins and two losses. Not qualifying directly, the Israelis had to dispute playoff games to define the last spots. On the playoffs, Israel had to face Belarus in two matches. After losing in Minsk on September 4, by 3:2 (19–25, 18–25, 25–18, 27–25, 15–13), a week later, in Ra'anana, Israel came back for a 3:1 win (25–22, 16–25, 25–20, 26–24) in front of 1,500 spectators, giving them the spot for the final round of the 2011 competition, after thirty nine years since they last took part on the finals.

In June 2010 women's team began the campaign debut in the European League. Israel has been inserted to Group B together with Turkey, Spain and Greece at the end the group stage, qualified for four major teams tournament held in late July 2010 in Ankara, the capital of Turkey. Losing by 3:0 to Serbia and 3:0 to Turkey, Israel got the fourth place of the league, its best result so far in any tournament.

== Results ==
=== Olympic Games ===
- 1964 to 2024 — did not compete

=== World Championship ===
- 1952 — did not compete
- 1956 — 14th place
- 1960 to 2006 — did not compete
- 2010 to 2025 — did not qualify

=== World Grand Prix ===
- 1993 to 2017 — did not compete

=== European Championship ===
- 1949 to 1963 — did not compete
- 1967 — 8th place
- 1971 — 11th place
- 1975 to 2007 — did not compete
- 2009 — did not qualify
- 2011 — 16th place
- 2013 to 2023 — did not qualify

=== European League ===
- 2009 — did not compete
- 2010 — 4th place
- 2011 — League round
- 2012 — 9th place
- 2013 — 8th place
- 2014 — did not compete
- 2015 — 3rd place
- 2016 — did not qualify
- 2017 — did not qualify
- 2018 — 18th place
- 2019 — 15th place
- 2020 — cancelled
- 2021 — 17th place
- 2022 — did not compete
- 2023 — did not compete
- 2024 — did not compete
- 2025 — 16th place
- 2026 — 19th place

== See also ==
- Israel men's national volleyball team
- Sport in Israel
