= 2011 Women's European Volleyball Championship =

Tournament details
- Host countries: Italy; Serbia
- Dates: 23 September – 2 October
- Teams: 16
- Venue: 4 (in 4 host cities)

Final positions
- Champions: Serbia (1st title)

Tournament awards
- MVP: (Serbia) Jovana Brakočević

The 2011 Women's European Volleyball Championship was the 27th edition of the European Volleyball Championship, organised by Europe's governing volleyball body, the Confédération Européenne de Volleyball. It was hosted in Italy and Serbia from 23 September to 2 October 2011.

== Qualification ==
Team	Method of qualification
Azerbaijan	Qualification Second round group A winners
Bulgaria	Qualification Second round group F winners
Croatia	Qualification Third round play-off winners
Czech Republic	Qualification Second round group B winners
France	Qualification Third round play-off winners
Germany	2009 edition fourth place
Israel	Qualification Third round play-off winners
Italy	Hosts
Netherlands	2009 edition second place
Poland	2009 edition third place
Romania	Qualification Second round group E winners
Russia	2009 edition sixth place
Serbia	Hosts
Spain	Qualification Second round group D winners
Turkey	2009 edition fifth place
Ukraine	Qualification Second round group C winners

== Format ==
The tournament was played in two different stages. In the first stage, the sixteen participants were divided in four groups of four teams each. A single round-robin format was played within each group to determine the teams group position, the three best teams of each group (total of 12 teams) progressed to the second stage, with group winners advancing to the quarterfinals while second and third placed advancing to the playoffs.

The second stage of the tournament consisted of a single-elimination, with winners advancing to the next round. A playoff was played (involving group second and third places) to determine which teams joined the group winners in the quarterfinals, followed by semifinals, third place match and final.

== Pools composition ==
Pool A	Pool B	Pool C	Pool D
France	Azerbaijan	Czech Republic	Bulgaria
Germany	Croatia	Israel	Netherlands
Serbia	Italy	Poland	Russia
Ukraine	Turkey	Romania	Spain

== Venues ==
The tournament was played at four venues in four cities (two in Italy and two in Serbia). Each city hosted a group during the preliminary round. Monza and Belgrade hosted the playoffs and quarterfinals. Belgrade also concluded the championship hosting the semifinals, third place match and final.

Pool A, Championship round	Pool C	Host cities in Serbia
Belgrade, Serbia	Zrenjanin, Serbia	Host cities in Serbia
Hala Pionir	Crystal Hall	Host cities in Serbia
Capacity: 5,900	Capacity: 2,800	Host cities in Serbia
Pool B, Playoffs and Quarterfinals	Pool D	Host cities in Italy
Monza, Italy	Busto Arsizio, Italy	Host cities in Italy
PalaIper	PalaYamamay	Host cities in Italy
Capacity: 4,500	Capacity: 5,000	Host cities in Italy

== Preliminary round ==
- All times are Central European Summer Time (UTC+02:00).

=== Pool A ===
- venue: Hala Pionir, Belgrade, Serbia

Pos	Team	Pld	W	L	Pts	SW	SL	SR	SPW	SPL	SPR	Qualification
1	Germany	3	3	0	9	9	1	9.000	245	187	1.310	Quarterfinals
2	Serbia	3	2	1	6	7	4	1.750	249	215	1.158	Playoffs
3	France	3	1	2	3	4	6	0.667	205	223	0.919	Playoffs
4	Ukraine	3	0	3	0	0	9	0.000	152	226	0.673	

Date	Time		Score		Set 1	Set 2	Set 3	Set 4	Set 5	Total	Report
24 Sep	17:00	Germany	3–0	Ukraine	25–17	25–15	25–17			75–49	Report
24 Sep	20:00	France	1–3	Serbia	25–20	15–25	11–25	19–25		70–95	Report
25 Sep	17:00	France	0–3	Germany	18–25	23–25	18–25			59–75	Report
25 Sep	20:00	Serbia	3–0	Ukraine	25–18	25–18	25–14			75–50	Report
26 Sep	17:00	Ukraine	0–3	France	24–26	14–25	15–25			53–76	Report
26 Sep	20:00	Serbia	1–3	Germany	22–25	15–25	25–20	17–25		79–95	Report

=== Pool B ===
- venue: PalaIper, Monza, Italy

Pos	Team	Pld	W	L	Pts	SW	SL	SR	SPW	SPL	SPR	Qualification
1	Italy	3	2	1	7	8	4	2.000	272	254	1.071	Quarterfinals
2	Turkey	3	2	1	5	6	6	1.000	275	258	1.066	Playoffs
3	Azerbaijan	3	1	2	3	5	7	0.714	262	283	0.926	Playoffs
4	Croatia	3	1	2	3	4	6	0.667	222	236	0.941	

Date	Time		Score		Set 1	Set 2	Set 3	Set 4	Set 5	Total	Report
23 Sep	17:30	Turkey	3–1	Azerbaijan	23–25	25–17	25–19	25–21		98–82	Report
23 Sep	20:30	Croatia	0–3	Italy	19–25	20–25	19–25			58–75	Report
24 Sep	17:30	Croatia	3–0	Turkey	25–21	25–23	25–22			75–66	Report
24 Sep	20:30	Italy	3–1	Azerbaijan	25–22	25–22	21–25	25–16		96–85	Report
25 Sep	17:30	Azerbaijan	3–1	Croatia	27–25	18–25	25–21	25–18		95–89	Report
25 Sep	20:30	Italy	2–3	Turkey	25–21	26–28	16–25	25–22	9–15	101–111	Report

=== Pool C ===
- venue: Crystal Hall, Zrenjanin, Serbia

Pos	Team	Pld	W	L	Pts	SW	SL	SR	SPW	SPL	SPR	Qualification
1	Poland	3	3	0	9	9	0	MAX	230	176	1.307	Quarterfinals
2	Czech Republic	3	2	1	6	6	3	2.000	220	185	1.189	Playoffs
3	Romania	3	1	2	3	3	6	0.500	202	210	0.962	Playoffs
4	Israel	3	0	3	0	0	9	0.000	144	225	0.640	

Date	Time		Score		Set 1	Set 2	Set 3	Set 4	Set 5	Total	Report
24 Sep	16:00	Israel	0–3	Poland	23–25	7–25	15–25			45–75	Report
24 Sep	19:00	Romania	0–3	Czech Republic	27–29	19–25	16–25			62–79	Report
25 Sep	16:00	Poland	3–0	Czech Republic	25–20	28–26	25–20			78–66	Report
25 Sep	19:00	Israel	0–3	Romania	17–25	23–25	14–25			54–75	Report
26 Sep	16:00	Czech Republic	3–0	Israel	25–11	25–18	25–16			75–45	Report
26 Sep	19:00	Poland	3–0	Romania	27–25	25–18	25–22			77–65	Report

=== Pool D ===
- venue: PalaYamamay, Busto Arsizio, Italy

Pos	Team	Pld	W	L	Pts	SW	SL	SR	SPW	SPL	SPR	Qualification
1	Russia	3	3	0	9	9	2	4.500	277	242	1.145	Quarterfinals
2	Netherlands	3	2	1	6	7	3	2.333	237	209	1.134	Playoffs
3	Spain	3	1	2	3	4	6	0.667	218	232	0.940	Playoffs
4	Bulgaria	3	0	3	0	0	9	0.000	177	226	0.783	

Date	Time		Score		Set 1	Set 2	Set 3	Set 4	Set 5	Total	Report
23 Sep	17:30	Netherlands	3–0	Spain	25–15	25–14	25–17			75–46	Report
23 Sep	20:30	Bulgaria	0–3	Russia	13–25	24–26	21–25			58–76	Report
24 Sep	17:30	Bulgaria	0–3	Netherlands	23–25	17–25	23–25			63–75	Report
24 Sep	20:30	Russia	3–1	Spain	32–30	19–25	25–20	25–22		101–97	Report
25 Sep	17:30	Russia	3–1	Netherlands	26–24	24–26	25–15	25–22		100–87	Report
25 Sep	20:30	Spain	3–0	Bulgaria	25–17	25–18	25–21			75–56	Report

== Championship round ==
- venues:

Hala Pionir, Belgrade, Serbia
PalaIper, Monza, Italy

- All times are Central European Summer Time (UTC+02:00).

Playoffs; 27–28 September
Czech Republic	3
France	1
Netherlands	3
Azerbaijan	1
Serbia	3
Romania	0
Turkey	3
Spain	0

Quarterfinals; 28–29 September
Germany	3
Czech Republic	0
Italy	3
Netherlands	1
Poland	0
Serbia	3
Russia	0
Turkey	3

Semifinals; 1 October
Germany	3
Italy	0
Serbia	3
Turkey	2

Final; 2 October
Germany	2
Serbia	3
Third place
Italy	2
Turkey	3

=== Playoffs ===
Date	Time		Score		Set 1	Set 2	Set 3	Set 4	Set 5	Total	Report
27 Sep	17:30	Turkey	3–0	Spain	25–19	25–17	25–21			75–57	Report
27 Sep	20:30	Netherlands	3–1	Azerbaijan	23–25	27–25	25–16	25–17		100–83	Report
28 Sep	17:00	Serbia	3–0	Romania	25–19	25–15	25–20			75–54	Report
28 Sep	20:00	Czech Republic	3–1	France	25–21	23–25	25–14	25–14		98–74	Report

=== Quarterfinals ===
Date	Time		Score		Set 1	Set 2	Set 3	Set 4	Set 5	Total	Report
28 Sep	17:30	Russia	0–3	Turkey	25–27	21–25	19–25			65–77	Report
28 Sep	20:30	Italy	3–1	Netherlands	25–21	25–20	21–25	25–18		96–84	Report
29 Sep	17:00	Germany	3–0	Czech Republic	25–18	25–20	25–17			75–55	Report
29 Sep	20:00	Poland	0–3	Serbia	17–25	21–25	24–26			62–76	Report

=== Semifinals ===
Date	Time		Score		Set 1	Set 2	Set 3	Set 4	Set 5	Total	Report
1 Oct	17:00	Germany	3–0	Italy	25–22	25–22	25–17			75–61	Report
1 Oct	20:00	Serbia	3–2	Turkey	25–15	25–22	23–25	20–25	15–13	108–100	Report

The semifinal and final matches played in Belgrade, Serbia, were stormy with more than five thousand Serbian audience. In the semifinal match between Serbia and Turkey, Serbia won with a 3:2 score and qualified for the final.

=== Bronze medal match ===
Date	Time		Score		Set 1	Set 2	Set 3	Set 4	Set 5	Total	Report
2 Oct	15:00	Italy	2–3	Turkey	21–25	25–15	27–25	19–25	10–15	102–105	Report

In order to get the third place in the tournament Turkey and Italy came to court and both teams wanted it so much to win, but Turkey was the one getting to the bronze medal with a 3:2 win.

=== Final ===
Date	Time		Score		Set 1	Set 2	Set 3	Set 4	Set 5	Total	Report
2 Oct	18:00	Germany	2–3	Serbia	25–16	20–25	25–19	23–25	9–15	102–100	Report

At the final match against Germany, Serbia was able to get the title of European Champion in front of its audience, ending the match and the tournament with a 3:2 score once more.

== Final standing ==
Rank	Team
1st place, gold medalist(s)	Serbia
2nd place, silver medalist(s)	Germany
3rd place, bronze medalist(s)	Turkey
4	Italy
5	Poland
6	Russia
7	Netherlands
8	Czech Republic
9	Azerbaijan
10	France
11	Spain
12	Romania
13	Croatia
14	Bulgaria
15	Ukraine
16	Israel

2011 Women's European champions

Serbia
1st title

Team Roster:

1 Ana Lazarević 2 Jovana Brakočević 3 Sanja Malagurski 5 Nataša Krsmanović 6 Tijana Malešević 7 Brižitka Molnar 8 Ana Antonijević 9 Jovana Vesović 10 Maja Ognjenović 12 Jelena Nikolić 14 Nađa Ninković 16 Milena Rašić 18 Suzana Ćebić (L)

19 Silvija Popović (L)
Head Coach: Zoran Terzić

== Individual awards ==
- MVP: Jovana Brakočević (SRB)
- Best scorer: Neslihan Darnel (TUR)
- Best spiker: Margareta Kozuch (GER)
- Best blocker: Christiane Fürst (GER)
- Best server: Bahar Toksoy (TUR)
- Best setter: Maja Ognjenović (SRB)
- Best receiver: Angelina Grün (GER)
- Best libero: Suzana Ćebić (SRB)
