= Suzana Ćebić =

Serbian volleyball player (born 1984)

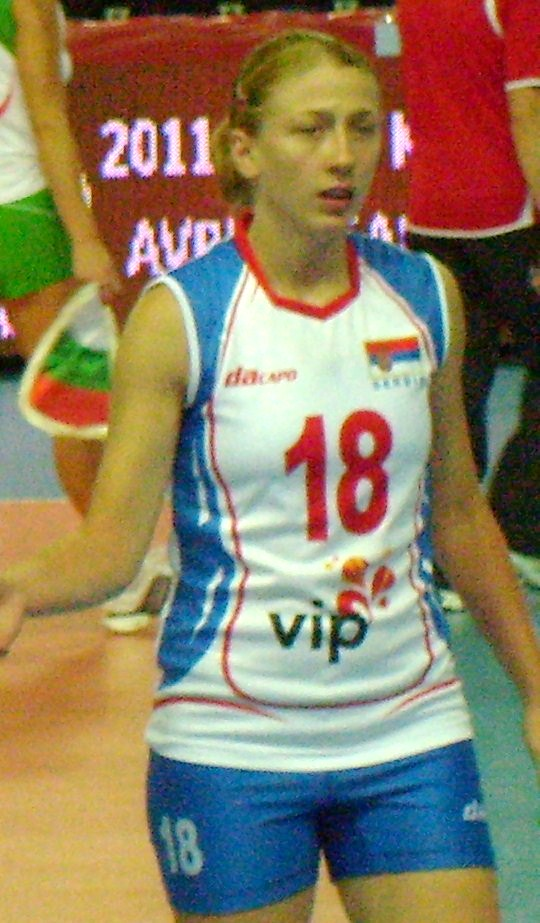
- Ćebić with Serbian national team, July 2010

Personal information
- Full name: Suzana Ćebić Pavić
- Nationality: Serbian
- Born: 9 November 1984 (age 41); Kosjerić, SR Serbia, SFR Yugoslavia
- Height: 1.67 m (5 ft 6 in)
- Weight: 60 kg (132 lb)
- Spike: 279 cm (110 in)
- Block: 255 cm (100 in)

Volleyball information
- Position: Libero
- Current club: (Romania) CSM Volei Alba Blaj

Career
Years	Teams
1998-2005; 2005-2008; 2008-2009; 2009-2010; 2010-2011; 2012-2013; 2013-2014; 2014-2015; 2015-2016; 2016-2017; 2017-2018; 2018-	Crnokosa Kosjerić; Jedinstvo Užice; Tenerife Marichal; CSU Metal Galați; VfB 91 Suhl; Rabita Baku; Lokomotiv Baku; CSM Târgoviște; Beijing; CSM Târgoviște; CSM București; CSM Volei Alba Blaj

National team
2005–2006; 2007–2017	Serbia and Montenegro; Serbia
Honours
Women's volleyball
Representing Serbia and Montenegro
World Championship
Bronze medal – third place	2006 Japan	Team
Representing Serbia
European Championship
Gold medal – first place	2011 Serbia / Italy	Team
Silver medal – second place	2007 Belgium / Luxembourg	Team
Bronze medal – third place	2015 Netherlands / Belgium	Team
World Cup
Silver medal – second place	2015 Japan
FIVB World Grand Prix
Bronze medal – third place	2011 Macau	Team
Bronze medal – third place	2013 Sapporo	Team
European League
Gold medal – first place	2010 Ankara	Team
Bronze medal – third place	2012 Karlovy Vary	Team
- Last updated: October 2011

Suzana Ćebić Pavić (Serbian Cyrillic: Сузана Ћебић; born 9 November 1984, in Kosjerić, Serbia) is a volleyball player from Serbia, playing as a libero for CSM Volei Alba Blaj.

== Career ==
Suzana was a member of the Women's National Team until 2017 (when she retired to make room for the youngsters) that won the silver medal at the 2007 European Championship in Belgium and Luxembourg. Ćebić was named "Best Libero" at the 2006 FIVB Women's World Championship, where Serbia claimed the bronze medal.

Ćebić won the silver medal in the 2012 FIVB Club World Championship, playing with the Azerbaijani club Rabita Baku.

== Awards ==
=== Individuals ===
- 2006 World Championship "Best Libero"
- 2011 European Championship "Best Libero"
- 2013 European Championship "Best Receiver"

=== National team ===
==== Senior team ====
- 2009 European League - Gold Medal
- 2010 European League - Gold Medal
- 2011 European Championship - Gold Medal

=== Clubs ===
- 2003 Serbian Cup - Champion, with Crnokosa Kosjerić
- 2006 Serbian Championship - Champion, with Jedinstvo Užice
- 2008 Spanish Supercup - Champion, with Tenerife Marichal
- 2010 Romanian Championship - Champion, with Metal Galaţi
- 2010 Romanian Cup - Champion, with Metal Galaţi
- 2012 FIVB Club World Championship - Runner-Up, with Rabita Baku
- 2012–13 CEV Champions League - Runner-Up, with Rabita Baku
- 2012-13 Azerbaijan Super League - Champion, with Rabita Baku
