= Jovana Vesović =

Serbian volleyball player (born 1987)

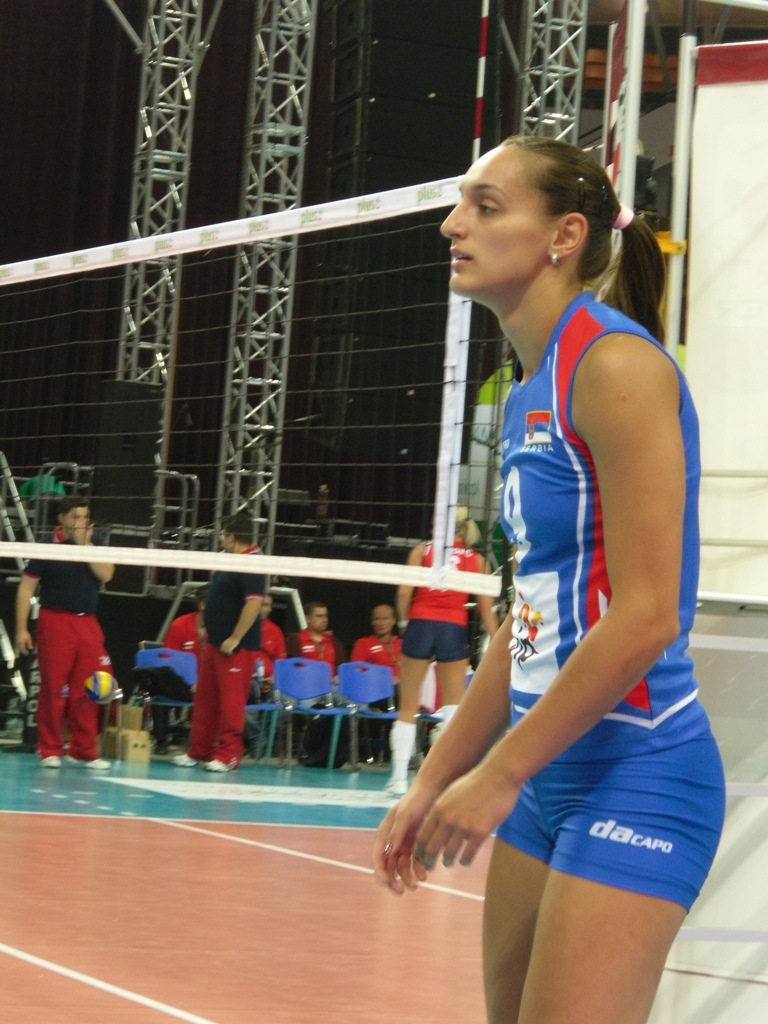

Personal information
- Nationality: Serbian
- Born: 21 June 1987 (age 39); Titovo Užice, SR Serbia, SFR Yugoslavia
- Height: 1.82 m (6 ft 0 in)
- Weight: 68

Volleyball information
- Position: Wing spiker
- Current club: Serbia, ŽOK Ub
- Number: 10

National team
2006-2012	Serbia
Medal record
Women's volleyball
Representing Serbia
World Championship
Bronze medal – third place	2006 Japan	Team
European Championships
Gold medal – first place	2011 Serbia / Italy	Team
Silver medal – second place	2007 Belgium/Luxembourg	Team
FIVB World Grand Prix
Bronze medal – third place	2011 Macau	Team
European League
Gold medal – first place	2010 Ankara	Team
Gold medal – first place	2011 Istanbul	Team
Bronze medal – third place	2012 Karlovy Vary	Team
Universiade
Silver medal – second place	2009 Belgrade	Team

Jovana Janković (Serbian: Јована Јанковић, née Vesović; born 21 June 1987) is a Serbian volleyball player who competed in the 2008 and 2012 Summer Olympics. She also won gold and silver medal at the European championship with the national team.
