= Volleyball at the 2009 Summer Universiade =

The volleyball competition in the 2009 Summer Universiade was held at different venues in Serbia between 2–11 July 2009.

== Men ==
Event	Gold	Silver	Bronze
Men's volleyball	Russia (RUS); Dmitry Shestak; Artem Khabibullin; Sergey Bagrey; Roman Danilov; Denis Kalinin; Dmitry Krasikov; Denis Biryukov; Dmitry Ilinykh; Alexey Lipezin; Alexander Sokolov; Nikita Tkachev; Dmitry Shcherbinin	Brazil (BRA); Denis Moraes; Theo Lopes; Rômulo Batista; Mauricio Borges; Bruno Temponi; Orestes Carvalho Jr. Marcos Cavalari; Mauricio Souza; Humberto Lima; Thiago Sens; Tiago Brendle; Aurivam Da Silva	Egypt (EGY); Abdalla Abdel-Salam; Abdel-Hay Ahmed Salah El-Din; Ahmed Abdel - Latif Osman; Mohamed Ahmed Mohamed; Youssef Saleh Fathy Mohamed; Rashad Shebl El - Dosouky; Afifi Ahmed Youssef; Mohamed Abdel - Moneim; Mahmoud Moustafa El - Koumy; Mohamed Aly Seifelnasr; Abdalla Hossam Youssef; Mohamed Essam El-Din

== Women ==
Event	Gold	Silver	Bronze
Women's volleyball	Italy (ITA); Enrica Merlo; Manuela Di Crescenzo; Giulia Pincerato; Serena Ortolani; Veronica Angeloni; Valentina Arrighetti; Federica Stufi; Lucia Crisanti; Lucia Bosetti; Ilaria Garzaro; Cristina Barcellini; Annamaria Quaranta	Serbia (SRB); Jelena Nikolić; Jovana Brakočević; Ivana Đerisilo Stanković; Nataša Krsmanović; Jasna Majstorović; Ana Antonijević; Jovana Vesović; Maja Ognjenović; Stefana Veljković; Milena Rašić; Silvija Popović; Sanja Bursać	Poland (POL); Anna Kaczmar; Ewelina Sieczka; Karolina Kosek; Katarzyna Wellna; Marta Haladyn; Dominika Koczorowska; Berenika Okuniewska; Katarzyna Zaroslinska; Krystyna Tkaczewska; Klaudia Kaczorowska; Zuzanna Efimienko; Paulina Maj
