= Nataša Krsmanović =

Serbian volleyball player (born 1985)

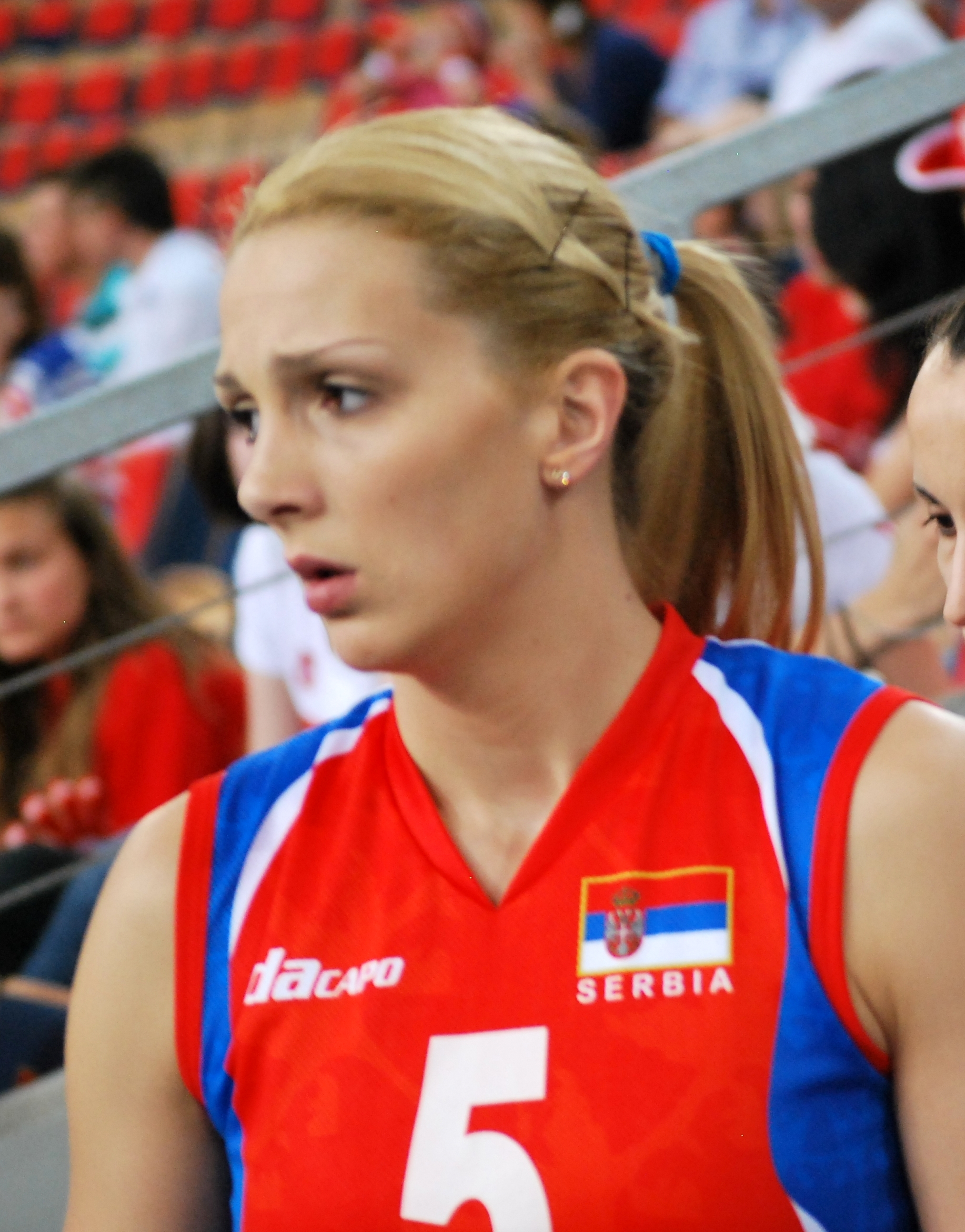
- Krsmanović in 2012

Personal information
- Full name: Nataša Krsmanović
- Born: 19 June 1985 (age 41); Titovo Užice, SR Serbia, SFR Yugoslavia
- Height: 1.88 m (6 ft 2 in)

Volleyball information
- Position: Middle blocker
- Current club: CSM Volei Alba Blaj
- Number: 5

Career
Years	Teams
2001–2004; 2004–2008; 2008–2010; 2010–2015; 2015-2016; 2016; 2017-2018; 2018 -	Jedinstvo Užice; Voléro Zürich; Galatasaray; Rabita Baku; Beijing; Azzurra Volley San Casciano; Seramiksan; CSM Volei Alba Blaj

National team
2005 - 2015	Serbia
Honours
Women's volleyball
Representing Serbia
World Championship
Bronze medal – third place	2006 Japan	Team
European Championships
Silver medal – second place	2007 Belgium-Luxembourg	Team
Gold medal – first place	2011 Serbia / Italy	Team
FIVB World Grand Prix
Bronze medal – third place	2011 Macau	Team
Bronze medal – third place	2013 Sapporo	Team
European League
Gold medal – first place	2010 Ankara	Team
Gold medal – first place	2011 Istanbul	Team
Bronze medal – third place	2012 Karlovy Vary	Team
Universiade
Silver medal – second place	2009 Belgrade	Team

Nataša Krsmanović (Serbian Cyrillic: Наташа Крсмановић, born 19 June 1985) is a Serbian volleyball player, who plays as a middle-blocker for Seramiksan in Turkish Women's Volleyball League. She was a member of the national teams that won the silver medal at the 2007 European Championship and competed at the 2008 and 2012 Summer Olympics.

== Career ==
Krsmanović lost the final game at the 2010–11 CEV Champions League Final Four with her team Rabita Baku, finishing as runner-up.

Krsmanović won the silver medal in the 2012 FIVB Club World Championship, playing with the Azerbaijani club Rabita Baku.

Krsmanović club, Rabita Baku won the bronze medal of the 2013–14 CEV Champions League after falling 0–3 to the Russian Dinamo Kazan in the semifinals, but defeating the Turkish Eczacıbaşı VitrA Istanbul 3–0 in the third place match.

== Awards ==
=== Individuals ===
- 2012–13 CEV Champions League "Best Blocker"

=== Clubs ===
- 2011 FIVB Club World Championship – Champion, with Rabita Baku
- 2010–11 CEV Champions League – Runner-Up, with Rabita Baku
- 2012 FIVB Club World Championship – Runner-Up, with Rabita Baku
- 2012–13 CEV Champions League – Runner-Up, with Rabita Baku
- 2013–14 CEV Champions League – Bronze medal, with Rabita Baku
- 2017–18 CEV Champions League – Runner-Up, with CSM Volei Alba Blaj
