= Strashimira Filipova =

Bulgarian volleyball player

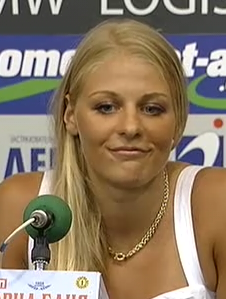

Personal information
- Full name: Strashimira Filipova
- Nickname: Strashi
- Born: August 18, 1985; Sofia, Bulgaria
- Height: 1.95 m (6 ft 5 in)
- Weight: 78 kg (172 lb)
- Spike: 307 cm (121 in)
- Block: 300 cm (118 in)

Volleyball information
- Position: Middle Blocker
- Current club: Fakel Novy Urengoy

Strashimira Filipova (Bulgarian Cyrillic: Страшимира Филипова; born August 18, 1985) is a Bulgarian volleyball player. She represented the Bulgaria national team at the 2005 Women’s European Volleyball Championship, which marked her debut for the national side.

== Career ==
Her youth years were spent with VC CSKA Sofia and she played for their senior team (2001–2003, 2004–2005). She has also donned the colours of the Slavia Sofia volleyball team (2003–2004). Filipova is also a former member of the RC Cannes team.

Filipova initially focused on the high jump, but switched to volleyball when she was in grade 9.

In 2009, she was part of the squad that finished in third place at the 2009 Women's European Volleyball League.

Filipova was a key member of the Bulgarian team that won a bronze medal at the 2011 Women's European Volleyball League. In 2011, she was chosen as the captain of the team for the 2011 Women's European Volleyball Championship, as Eva Yaneva was banned from participating in the tournament.

== Awards ==
=== Individuals ===
- 2010 European Volleyball League "Best Server"

=== National team ===
- 2009 Women's European Volleyball League – Bronze medal
- 2011 Women's European Volleyball League – Bronze medal
- 2012 Women's European Volleyball League – Silver medal
- 2013 Women's European Volleyball League – Bronze medal
