= Sanja Malagurski =

Serbian volleyball player (born 1990)

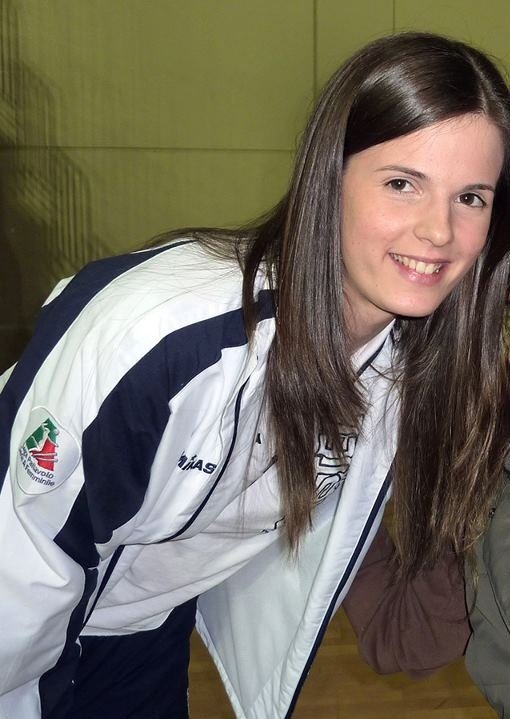

Personal information
- Full name: Sanja Malagurski
- Nationality: Serbia
- Born: June 8, 1990 (age 36); Subotica, Serbia
- Height: 191 cm (6 ft 3 in)
- Spike: 288 cm (113 in)
- Block: 280 cm (110 in)

Volleyball information
- Position: Outside hitter

National team
2007–2018	Serbia
Honours
Women's volleyball
Representing Serbia
European Championships
Gold medal – first place	2011 Serbia / Italy	Team
FIVB World Grand Prix
Bronze medal – third place	2011 Macau	Team
Bronze medal – third place	2017 Nanjing	Team
European League
Gold medal – first place	2009 Kayseri	Team
Gold medal – first place	2010 Ankara	Team
Gold medal – first place	2011 Istanbul	Team

Sanja Malagurski (Serbian Cyrillic: Сања Малагурски; born 8 June 1990) is a former Serbian volleyball player who competed in the 2008 Summer Olympics.

== Career ==
In 2008, she was eliminated with the Serbian team in the quarter-finals of the Olympic tournament.

Sanja was playing for Brazilian club Osasco Voleibol Clube and won the silver medal in the 2014 FIVB Club World Championship after her club lost 0–3 to the Russian Dinamo Kazan in the championship match.

In season of 2017-2018 Sanja plays for Italian club Foppapedretti Bergamo (Italy) .

== Awards ==
=== Clubs ===
- 2013/2014 Paulista Championship – Champion, with Molico Osasco
- 2014 Brazilian Cup – Champion, with Molico Osasco
- 2014 FIVB Club World Championship – Runner-up, with Molico Osasco
- 2013/2014 Brazilian Superliga – 3rd place, with Molico Osasco
