= Brižitka Molnar =

Serbian volleyball player (born 1985)

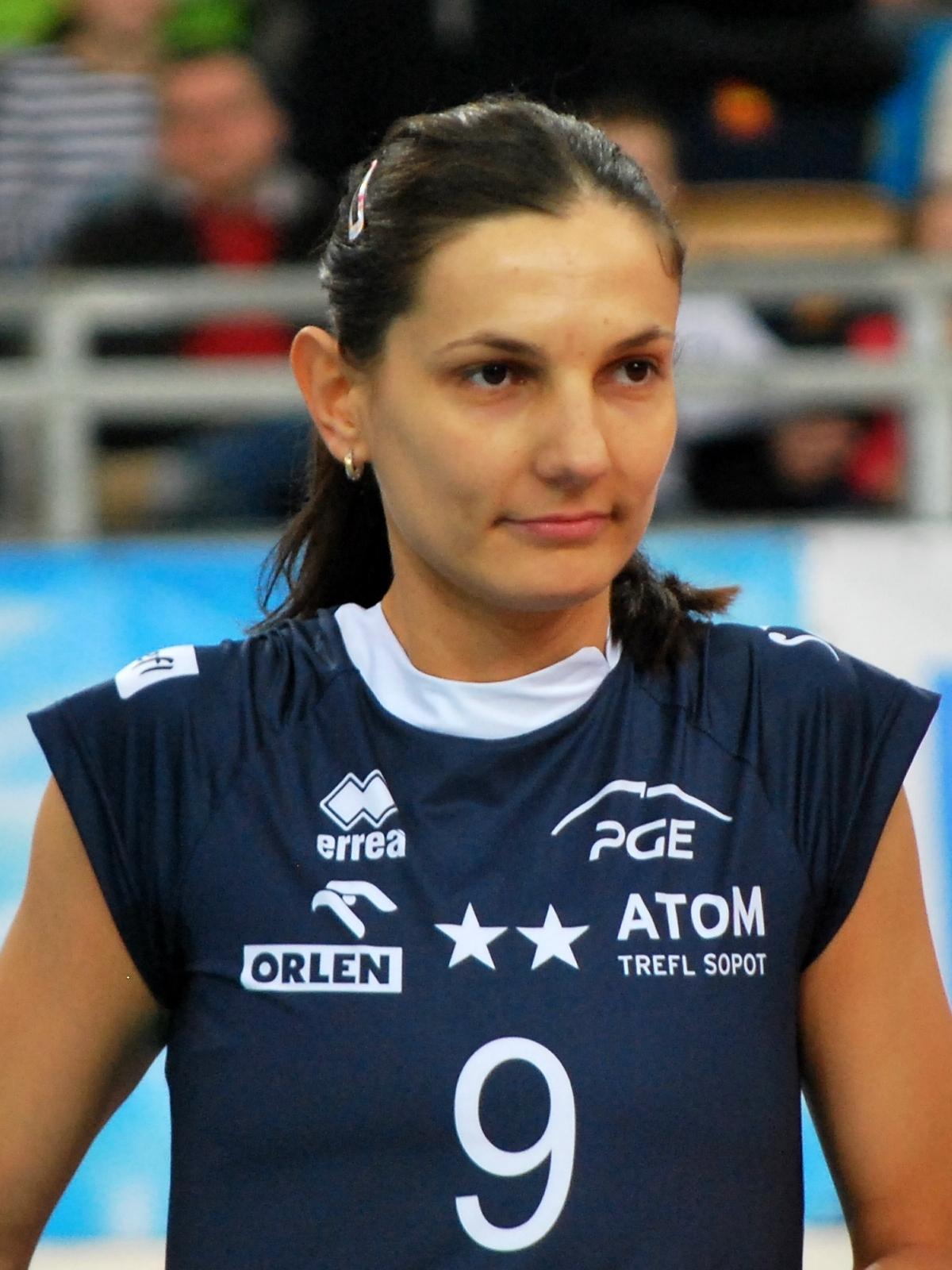
- Molnar with Serbia team

Personal information
- Full name: Brižitka Molnar
- Nickname: Biki
- Nationality: Serbian
- Born: 28 July 1985 (age 41); Torak, SR Serbia, SFR Yugoslavia
- Height: 1.84 m (6 ft 0 in)
- Weight: 66 kg (146 lb)
- Spike: 308 cm (121 in)
- Block: 294 cm (116 in)

Volleyball information
- Position: Outside hitter

National team
2005–2006; 2007 –	Serbia and Montenegro; Serbia
Honours
Women's volleyball
World Championship
Bronze medal – third place	2006 Japan	Team
European Championships
Gold medal – first place	2011 Serbia / Italy	Team
Silver medal – second place	2007 Belgium/Luxembourg	Team
FIVB World Grand Prix
Bronze medal – third place	2011 Macau	Team
Bronze medal – third place	2013 Sapporo	Team
European Games
Bronze medal – third place	2015 Baku	Team
European League
Gold medal – first place	2009 Kayseri	Team
Gold medal – first place	2010 Ankara	Team
Gold medal – first place	2011 Istanbul	Team
- Last updated: 14 January 2016

Brižitka Molnar (Serbian Cyrillic: Брижитка Молнар; born 28 July 1985 in Torak, Serbia) is a retired Serbian volleyball player who plays as an outside hitter.

She competed in the 2008 Summer Olympics where she was eliminated with the Serbian team in the quarter-finals of the tournament, and at the 2013 FIVB World Grand Prix.

== Clubs ==
Club	Country	From	To
OK Klek	Serbia and Montenegro	2000–2001	2005–2006
Metal Galaţi	Romania	2006–2007	2008–2009
Panathinaikos Athens	Greece	2009–2010	2010–2011
NEC Red Rockets	Japan	2011–2012	2011–2012
Galatasaray Daikin	Turkey	2012–2013	2012–2013
Atom Trefl Sopot	Poland	2013–2014	2013–2014
Tianjin Volleyball	China	2014–2015	2014–2015
Panathinaikos Athens	Greece	2016	2016

== Awards ==
=== Club ===
- 2010 Greek Championship with Panathinaikos
- 2010 Greek Cup with Panathinaikos
- 2011 Greek Championship with Panathinaikos
- 2012 Turkish Volleyball Super Cup - Runner-Up, with Galatasaray Daikin
- 2012-2013 Turkish Women's Volleyball Cup - Bronze Medal with Galatasaray Daikin
