= Isailović =

Isailović (Serbian: Исаиловић) is a Serbian surname derived from a masculine given name Isailo. It may refer to:

- Bojan Isailović (born 1980), football player
- Dragan Isailović (born 1976), footballer
- Ivana Isailović (born 1986), female volleyball player
- Marko Isailovic (born 1996), rugby player
