= Nađa Ninković =

Serbian volleyball player

Personal information
- Full name: Nađa Ninković
- Nationality: Serbian
- Born: November 1, 1991 (age 34); Belgrade, SR Serbia, SFR Yugoslavia
- Height: 1.93 m (6 ft 4 in)
- Weight: 77 kg (170 lb)
- Spike: 312 cm (123 in)
- Block: 307 cm (121 in)

Volleyball information
- Position: Middle Blocker
- Current club: CSM Volei Alba Blaj

Career
Years	Teams
2006-10; 2011-15; 2015; 2016-17; 2017-18; 2018-	(Serbia) OK Crvena Zvezda (Switzerland) Voléro Zürich (Italy) Il Bisonte Firenze (Romania) CS Volei Alba-Blaj (Brazil) Vôlei Nestlé (Romania) CSM Volei Alba Blaj

National team
Serbia
Honours
Women's volleyball
Representing Serbia
European Championships
Gold medal – first place	2011 Serbia / Italy	Team
FIVB World Grand Prix
Bronze medal – third place	2011 Macau	Team
Bronze medal – third place	2013 Sapporo	Team
European League
Gold medal – first place	2009 Kayseri	Team
Gold medal – first place	2011 Istanbul	Team
Bronze medal – third place	2012 Karlovy Vary	Team
- Last updated: 26 July 2010

Nađa Ninković (Serbian: Нађа Нинковић; born November 1, 1991) is a professional volleyball player from Serbia, who was a member of the Serbia women's national volleyball team that won the gold medal at the 2011 European Championship in Serbia and Italy. She plays for CSM Volei Alba Blaj.

She is daughter of Serbian actor Slobodan Ninković.

== Career ==
Ninković won the bronze medal at the 2015 FIVB Club World Championship, playing with the Swiss club Voléro Zürich.

== Awards ==
=== Individuals ===
- 2009 European League "Best Blocker"

=== Clubs ===
- 2015 FIVB Club World Championship - Bronze medal, with Voléro Zürich
