= Jelena Blagojević =

Serbian volleyball player (born 1988)

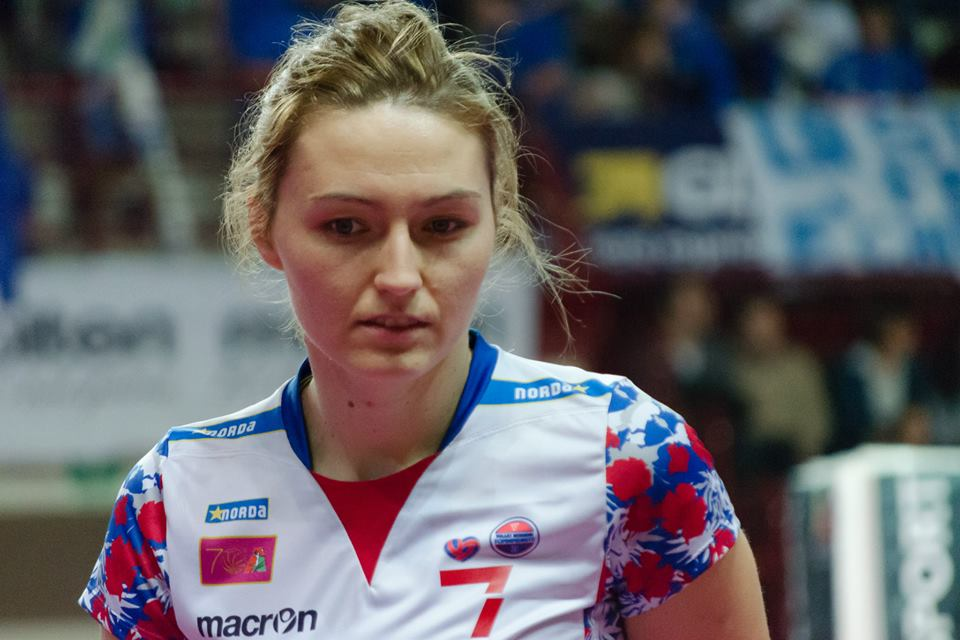
- Blagojević playing for Volley Bergamo in April 2015

Personal information
- Born: 1 December 1988 (age 37); Olovo, SR Bosnia-Herzegovina, SFR Yugoslavia
- Height: 1.81 m (5 ft 11 in)
- Weight: 68 kg (150 lb)
- Spike: 267 cm (105 in)
- Block: 242 cm (95 in)

Volleyball information
- Position: Outside hitter, Libero
- Current club: KS DevelopRes Rzeszów
- Number: 7

Career
Years	Teams
2007–2011; 2011–2012; 2012–2015; 2015–2016; 2016–2017; 2017 -	OK Crvena zvezda Volley Urbino; Volley Bergamo; Trabzon İdmanocağı; KPS Chemik Police; KS Developres Rzeszów

National team
Serbia
Honours
Women's volleyball
Representing Serbia
Olympic Games
Bronze medal – third place	2020 Tokyo	Team
European Championship
Gold medal – first place	2017 Azerbaijan/Georgia
Gold medal – first place	2019 Turkey
Silver medal – second place	2021 Serbia/Croatia/Bulgaria/Romania
FIVB World Grand Prix
Bronze medal – third place	2017 Nanjing
European League
Bronze medal – third place	2012 Karlovy Vary

Jelena Blagojević (born 1 December 1988) is a Serbian professional volleyball player and two-time Olympian. She plays for Serbia women's national volleyball team. She competed in the 2012 Summer Olympics in London, United Kingdom. She also competed in the 2020 Summer Olympics in Tokyo, Japan and won a bronze medal. She is 1.81 m (5 ft 11 in) tall. She plays for KS DevelopRes Rzeszów in Poland.

== Achievements ==
=== Clubs ===
- Serbian volleyball league: 2009/10, 2010/11
- Serbian Volleyball Cup: 2009/10, 2010/11
- Polish Volleyball League: 2016/17
- MVP CEV Women's Challenge Cup: 2015/16
- Best Outside hitter, Polish cup : 2019/2020
- Polish Supercup: 2022/23
- MVP Polish Supercup: 2022/23
