= Jasna Majstorović =

Serbian volleyball player

Jasna Majstorović Јасна Мајсторовић

Personal information
- Full name: Jasna Majstorović
- Nationality: Serbia
- Born: April 23, 1984 (age 42); Čačak, SFR Yugoslavia
- Height: 1.80 m (5 ft 11 in)
- Weight: 64 kg (141 lb)
- Spike: 200 cm (79 in)
- Block: 293 cm (115 in)

Volleyball information
- Position: Winger/spiker
- Current club: CSM București (women's volleyball)
- Number: 6

Career
Years	Teams
2000–2005; 2005–2006; 2006–2009; 2009–2010; 2010–2011; 2011–2012; 2012-2013; 2014-	OK Jedinstvo Užice; Voléro Zürich; Poštar 064 Belgrad; Beşiktaş; C.S. Volei 2004 Tomis Constanța; Rabita Baku; Tomis Constanța; CSM București

National team
Serbia
Honours
Women's volleyball
Representing Serbia
European Championships
Silver medal – second place	2007 Belgium-Luxembourg	Team
FIVB World Grand Prix
Bronze medal – third place	2013 Sapporo	Team
European League
Gold medal – first place	2010 Ankara	Team
Universiade
Silver medal – second place	2009 Belgrade	Team
- Last updated: March 9, 2013

Jasna Majstorović (Serbian: Јасна Мајсторовић; born April 23, 1984) is a volleyball player from Serbia, playing as a spiker/winger. She was a member of the Women's National Team that won the silver medal at the 2007 European Championship in Belgium and Luxembourg. She plays for Romanian club CSM București.

== Awards ==
=== Clubs ===
- 2011 FIVB Club World Championship - Champion, with Rabita Baku
