= Serbia women's national volleyball team =

Women's national volleyball team representing Serbia

Serbia
- Association: Volleyball Federation of Serbia
- Confederation: CEV
- Head coach: Zoran Terzić
- FIVB ranking: 9 (2 October 2026)

Uniforms
Home	Away

Summer Olympics
- Appearances: 5 (First in 2008)
- Best result: (silver) (2016)

World Championship
- Appearances: 7 (First in 1978)
- Best result: (gold) (2018, 2022)

World Cup
- Appearances: 4 (First in 2007)
- Best result: (2015)

European Championship
- Appearances: 22 (First in 1951)
- Best result: (2011, 2017, 2019)
- www.ossrb.org (in Serbian)
Honours
Event	1st	2nd	3rd
Olympic Games	0	1	1
World Championship	2	0	1
World Cup	0	1	0
World Grand Prix	0	0	3
European Championship	3	3	3
Nations League	0	0	1
European League	3	0	1
Mediterranean Games	1	1	3
Total	9	6	13
Representing Yugoslavia / Serbia and Montenegro / Serbia
Summer Olympics
Silver medal – second place	2016 Rio de Janeiro	Team
Bronze medal – third place	2020 Tokyo	Team
World Championship
Gold medal – first place	2018 Japan	Team
Gold medal – first place	2022 Netherlands/Poland	Team
Bronze medal – third place	2006 Japan	Team
World Cup
Silver medal – second place	2015 Japan	
World Grand Prix
Bronze medal – third place	2011 Macau	
Bronze medal – third place	2013 Sapporo	
Bronze medal – third place	2017 Nanjing	
Nations League
Bronze medal – third place	2022 Ankara	
European Championship
Gold medal – first place	2011 Serbia/Italy	
Gold medal – first place	2017 Azerbaijan/Georgia	
Gold medal – first place	2019 Slovakia/Hungary/Poland/Turkey	
Silver medal – second place	2007 Belgium/Luxembourg	
Silver medal – second place	2021 Serbia/Croatia/Bulgaria/Romania	
Silver medal – second place	2023 Belgium/Estonia/Germany/Italy	
Bronze medal – third place	1951 France	
Bronze medal – third place	2015 Netherlands/Belgium	
Bronze medal – third place	2026 Azerbaijan/Czech Republic/Sweden/Turkey	
European Games
Bronze medal – third place	2015 Baku	Team
European League
Gold medal – first place	2009 Kayseri	
Gold medal – first place	2010 Ankara	
Gold medal – first place	2011 Istanbul	
Bronze medal – third place	2012 Karlovy Vary	
Mediterranean Games
Gold medal – first place	1975 Algiers	
Silver medal – second place	1979 Split	
Bronze medal – third place	1983 Casablanca	
Bronze medal – third place	2022 Oran	
Bronze medal – third place	2026 Taranto	
Montreux Volley Masters
Silver medal – second place	1987 Montreux	
Bronze medal – third place	1988 Montreux	
Memorial of Agata Mróz-Olszewska
Gold medal – first place	2024 Mielec	
Silver medal – second place	2010 Katowice	
Savaria Cup
Gold medal – first place	2004 Szombathely	
Yeltsin Cup
Gold medal – first place	2017 Yekaterinburg	
Gloria Cup
Gold medal – first place	2019 Belek	
Trofeo Valle d'Aosta
Bronze medal – third place	2005 Courmayeur	
Summer Universiade
Silver medal – second place	2007 Bangkok	
Silver medal – second place	2009 Belgrade	

The Serbia women's national volleyball team is governed by the Volleyball Federation of Serbia and takes part in international volleyball competitions.

FIVB considers Serbia the inheritor of the records of SFR Yugoslavia (1948–1992) and Serbia and Montenegro (1992–2006). The Olympic Committee of Serbia declared the women's national volleyball squad Team of The Year thirteen times from 2006 to 2023.

Serbia earned a silver medal at the 2016 summer Olympics, a bronze medal at the 2020 summer Olympics, and won back to back the FIVB World Championship in 2018 and 2022.

== Results ==
=== Olympic Games ===
Champions Runners up Third place Fourth place

Year	Round	Position	Pld	W	L	SW	SL
1964 – 1988	part of Yugoslavia						
(Spain) 1992	suspended						
(United States) 1996	did not qualify						
(Australia) 2000	did not qualify						
(Greece) 2004	did not qualify						
(China) 2008	Quarterfinals	5th	6	2	4	6	13
(United Kingdom) 2012	Preliminary round	11th	5	0	5	2	15
(Brazil) 2016	Final	2nd place, silver medalist(s)	8	5	3	19	11
(Japan) 2020	Semifinals	3rd place, bronze medalist(s)	8	6	2	19	6
(France) 2024	Quarterfinals	7th	4	1	3	6	9
(United States) 2028	to be determined						
(Australia) 2032	to be determined						
Total	Qualified: 5/11		31	14	17	52	54

=== World Championship ===
Champions Runners up Third place Fourth place

Year	Round	Position	Pld	W	L	SW	SL
(Brazil) 1994	banned from entering the qualifying tournaments						
(Japan) 1998	did not qualify						
(Germany) 2002	did not qualify						
(Japan) 2006	Semifinal	3rd place, bronze medalist(s)	11	9	2	30	12
(Japan) 2010	Second Round	8th	11	6	5	20	18
(Italy) 2014	Second Round	7th	9	6	3	19	13
(Japan) 2018	Final	1st place, gold medalist(s)	13	11	2	34	10
(Netherlands) (Poland) 2022	Final	1st place, gold medalist(s)	12	12	0	36	5
(Thailand) 2025	Round of 16	10th	4	2	2	9	6
(Canada) (United States) 2027	qualified						
(Philippines) 2029	to be determined						
Total	Qualified: 7/11		60	46	14	148	64

=== World Cup ===
Year	Position	Pld	W	L	SW	SL
(Japan) 1995	did not qualify					
(Japan) 1999	did not qualify					
(Japan) 2003	did not qualify					
(Japan) 2007	5th	11	7	4	26	15
(Japan) 2011	7th	11	5	6	22	19
(Japan) 2015	2nd place, silver medalist(s)	11	10	1	31	11
(Japan) 2019	9th	11	4	7	20	24
Total	Qualified: 4/7	44	26	18	99	69

=== World Grand Prix ===
Year	Position	Pld	W	L	SW	SL
1993 to 2010	did not qualify					
(Macau) 2011	3rd place, bronze medalist(s)	14	10	4	35	17
(China) 2012	11th	9	3	6	15	19
(Japan) 2013	3rd place, bronze medalist(s)	14	10	4	35	17
(Japan) 2014	7th	9	4	5	18	18
(United States) 2015	8th	9	3	6	17	19
(Thailand) 2016	7th	9	5	4	18	20
(China) 2017	3rd place, bronze medalist(s)	13	10	3	33	15
Total	Qualified: 7/25	77	45	32	171	125

=== Nations League ===
Year	Position	Pld	W	L	SW	SL
(China) 2018	5th	17	12	5	43	21
(China) 2019	13th	15	5	10	20	33
(China) 2020	not held due to the COVID-19 pandemic					
(Italy) 2021	13th	15	4	11	19	36
(Turkey) 2022	3rd place, bronze medalist(s)	15	10	5	34	25
(United States) 2023	9th	12	6	6	27	27
(Thailand) 2024	12th	12	3	9	16	29
(Poland) 2025	15th	12	3	9	21	28
(Macau) 2026	11th	12	5	7	26	21
(N/A) 2027	qualified					
Total	9/9	110	48	62	206	220

=== European Championship ===
Champions Runners up Third place Fourth place

Year	Round	Position	Pld	W	L	SW	SL
1949 – 1991	part of Yugoslavia						
(Czech Republic) 1993	banned from entering the qualifying tournament						
(Netherlands) 1995	did not enter the qualifying tournament						
(Czech Republic) 1997	did not qualify						
(Italy) 1999	did not enter the qualifying tournament						
(Bulgaria) 2001	did not enter the qualifying tournament						
(Turkey) 2003	Preliminary Round	9th	5	1	4	5	12
(Croatia) 2005	Preliminary Round	7th	7	3	4	12	15
(Belgium) (Luxembourg) 2007	Final	2nd place, silver medalist(s)	8	5	3	17	14
(Poland) 2009	Playoff Round	7th	6	3	3	12	9
(Italy) (Serbia) 2011	Final	1st place, gold medalist(s)	7	6	1	19	8
(Germany) (Switzerland) 2013	Semifinals	4th	6	3	3	13	10
(Netherlands) (Belgium) 2015	Semifinals	3rd place, bronze medalist(s)	6	5	1	16	4
(Azerbaijan) (Georgia (country)) 2017	Final	1st place, gold medalist(s)	6	6	0	18	2
(Hungary) (Poland) (Slovakia) (Turkey) 2019	Final	1st place, gold medalist(s)	9	9	0	27	6
(Bulgaria) (Croatia) (Romania) (Serbia) 2021	Final	2nd place, silver medalist(s)	9	8	1	25	7
(Belgium) (Italy) (Germany) (Estonia) 2023	Final	2nd place, silver medalist(s)	9	8	1	26	7
(Azerbaijan) (Czech Republic) (Sweden) (Turkey) 2026	Semifinals	3rd place, bronze medalist(s)	9	8	1	24	6
(Spain) 2028	To be determined						
Total	Qualified: 12/35		87	65	22	214	100

=== European Games ===
Year	Position	Pld	W	L	SW	SL
(Azerbaijan) 2015	3rd place, bronze medalist(s)	8	6	2	22	11
Total	Qualified: 1/1	8	6	2	22	11

=== European Volleyball League ===
Champions Runners up Third place Fourth place

Year	Position	Pld	W	L	SW	SL
(Turkey) 2009	1st place, gold medalist(s)	14	12	2	39	15
(Turkey) 2010	1st place, gold medalist(s)	14	13	1	40	7
(Turkey) 2011	1st place, gold medalist(s)	14	14	0	42	4
(Czech Republic) 2012	3rd place, bronze medalist(s)	14	13	1	40	10
(Bulgaria) 2013	5th	12	6	6	22	23
(European Union) 2014	did not enter					
(European Union) 2015	did not enter					
(European Union) 2016	did not enter					
(European Union) 2017	did not enter					
(Hungary) 2018	did not enter					
(Croatia) 2019	did not enter					
(Bulgaria) 2020	not held due to the COVID-19 pandemic					
(Bulgaria) (Slovenia) 2021	did not enter					
(European Union) 2022	did not enter					
(European Union) 2023	did not enter					
(European Union) 2024	did not enter					
(European Union) 2025	did not enter					
(European Union) 2026	did not enter					
Total	Qualified: 5/14	68	58	10	183	59

=== Mediterranean Games ===
Year	Position
1975 – 1991	part of Yugoslavia
(France) 1993 Languedoc-Roussillon	banned from entering Games
(Italy) 1997 Bari	4th place
(Tunisia) 2001 Tunis	6th place
2005 – 2018	did not enter
(Algeria) 2022 Oran	3rd place
(Italy) 2026 Taranto	3rd place
Total	Participated: 4/9

== Team ==
=== Current squad ===
The following is the Serbian roster for the 2025 World Championship.

Head coach: Zoran Terzić

No.	Name	Date of birth	Height	Weight	Spike	Block	Position	2025–26 club
2	Katarina Lazović	12 September 1999	1.82 m (6 ft 0 in)	65 kg (143 lb)	310 cm (120 in)	305 cm (120 in)	Outside Hitter	(Turkey) VakıfBank S.K.
5	Mina Popović	16 September 1994	1.87 m (6 ft 2 in)	85 kg (187 lb)	315 cm (124 in)	305 cm (120 in)	Middle Blocker	-
8	Slađana Mirković	7 October 1995	1.85 m (6 ft 1 in)	74 kg (163 lb)	293 cm (115 in)	282 cm (111 in)	Setter	(Kazakhstan) VC Kuanysh
11	Hena Kurtagić	27 August 2004	1.95 m (6 ft 5 in)	85 kg (187 lb)	320 cm (130 in)	307 cm (121 in)	Middle Blocker	(Italy) Vero Volley Milano
12	Teodora Pušić	12 March 1993	1.70 m (5 ft 7 in)	58 kg (128 lb)	270 cm (110 in)	260 cm (100 in)	Libero	(United States) Orlando Valkyries
14	Maja Aleksić	6 June 1997	1.88 m (6 ft 2 in)	72 kg (159 lb)	302 cm (119 in)	290 cm (110 in)	Middle Blocker	(Turkey) Zeren Spor Kulübü
15	Aleksandra Uzelac	27 July 2004	1.88 m (6 ft 2 in)	74 kg (163 lb)	315 cm (124 in)	310 cm (120 in)	Outside Hitter	(Turkey) Zeren Spor Kulübü
16	Aleksandra Jegdić	9 October 1994	1.67 m (5 ft 6 in)	58 kg (128 lb)	262 cm (103 in)	248 cm (98 in)	Libero	(United States) Columbus Fury
18	Tijana Bošković	8 March 1997	1.94 m (6 ft 4 in)	78 kg (172 lb)	325 cm (128 in)	317 cm (125 in)	Opposite spiker	(Turkey) VakıfBank S.K.
19	Bojana Milenković	6 March 1997	1.85 m (6 ft 1 in)	70 kg (150 lb)	294 cm (116 in)	288 cm (113 in)	Outside Hitter	(Turkey) Fenerbahçe S.K.
26	Maša Kirov	16 August 2005	1.89 m (6 ft 2 in)	78 kg (172 lb)	304 cm (120 in)	295 cm (116 in)	Middle Blocker	(Brazil) Sesc RJ Flamengo
27	Vanja Bukilić	13 June 1999	1.98 m (6 ft 6 in)	89 kg (196 lb)	320 cm (130 in)	310 cm (120 in)	Opposite spiker	(Italy) Il Bisonte Firenze
28	Marija Miljević	9 July 1998	1.78 m (5 ft 10 in)	62 kg (137 lb)	272 cm (107 in)	262 cm (103 in)	Setter	(Greece) Aris Thessaloniki
40	Vanja Ivanović	22 October 2004	1.85 m (6 ft 1 in)	73 kg (161 lb)	305 cm (120 in)	305 cm (120 in)	Outside Hitter	(Russia) Korabelka

=== Previous squads ===
- 2003 European Championship — 9th place
  Sanja Starović, Svetlana Ilić, Maja Ilić, Aleksandra Ranković, Ivana Đerisilo, Vesna Tomašević, Anja Spasojević, Jelena Nikolić, Aleksandra Milosavljević, Maja Simanić, Mira Golubović, Ivana Krdžić. Head Coach: Zoran Terzić.
- 2005 European Championship — 7th place
  Sanja Starović, Marina Vujović, Vesna Čitaković, Aleksandra Ranković, Ivana Đerisilo, Brižitka Molnar, Anja Spasojević, Jelena Nikolić, Maja Ognjenović, Maja Simanić, Nataša Krsmanović, Aleksandra Avramović. Head Coach: Zoran Terzić.

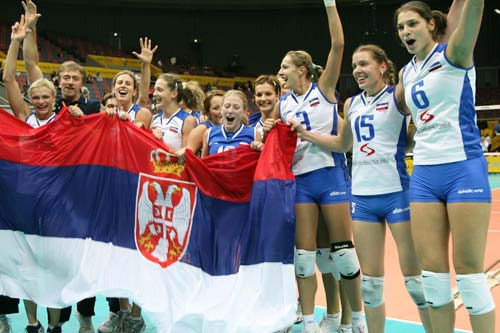
2006 World Championship, 3rd place.

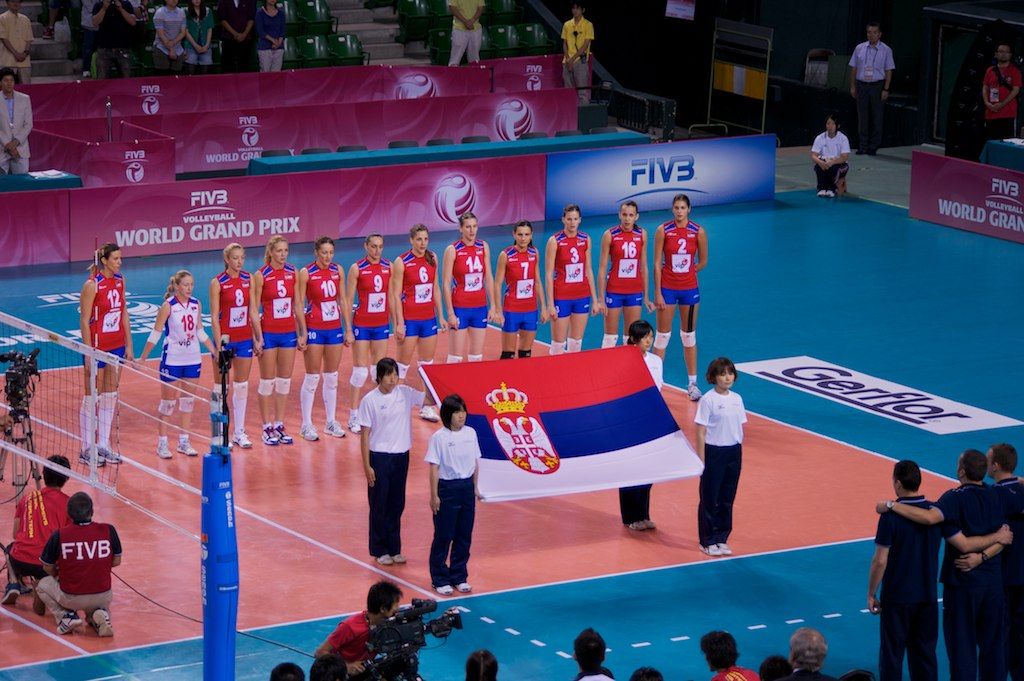
2011 FIVB Volleyball World Grand Prix, 3rd place

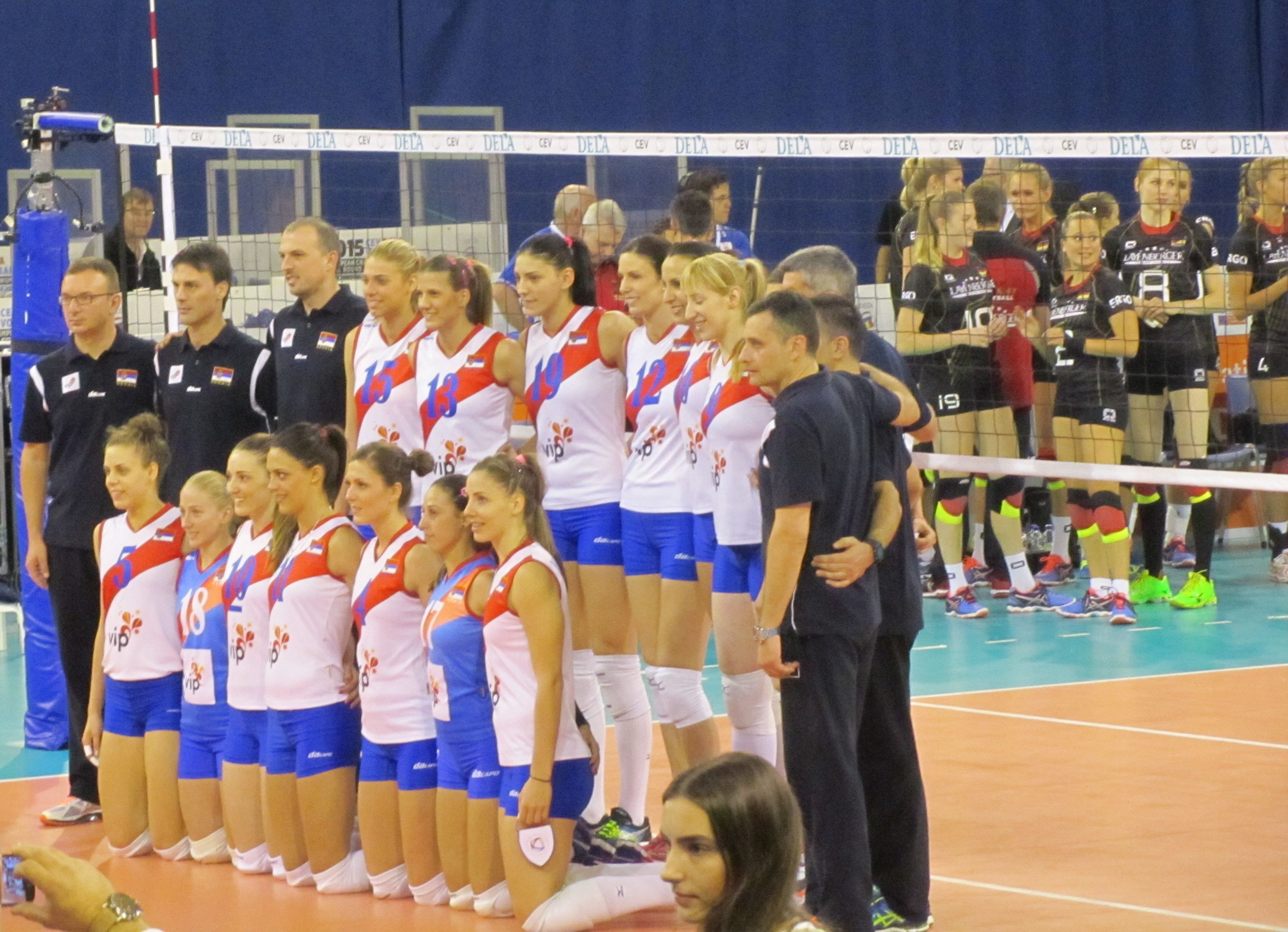
European Championships 2015, 3rd place

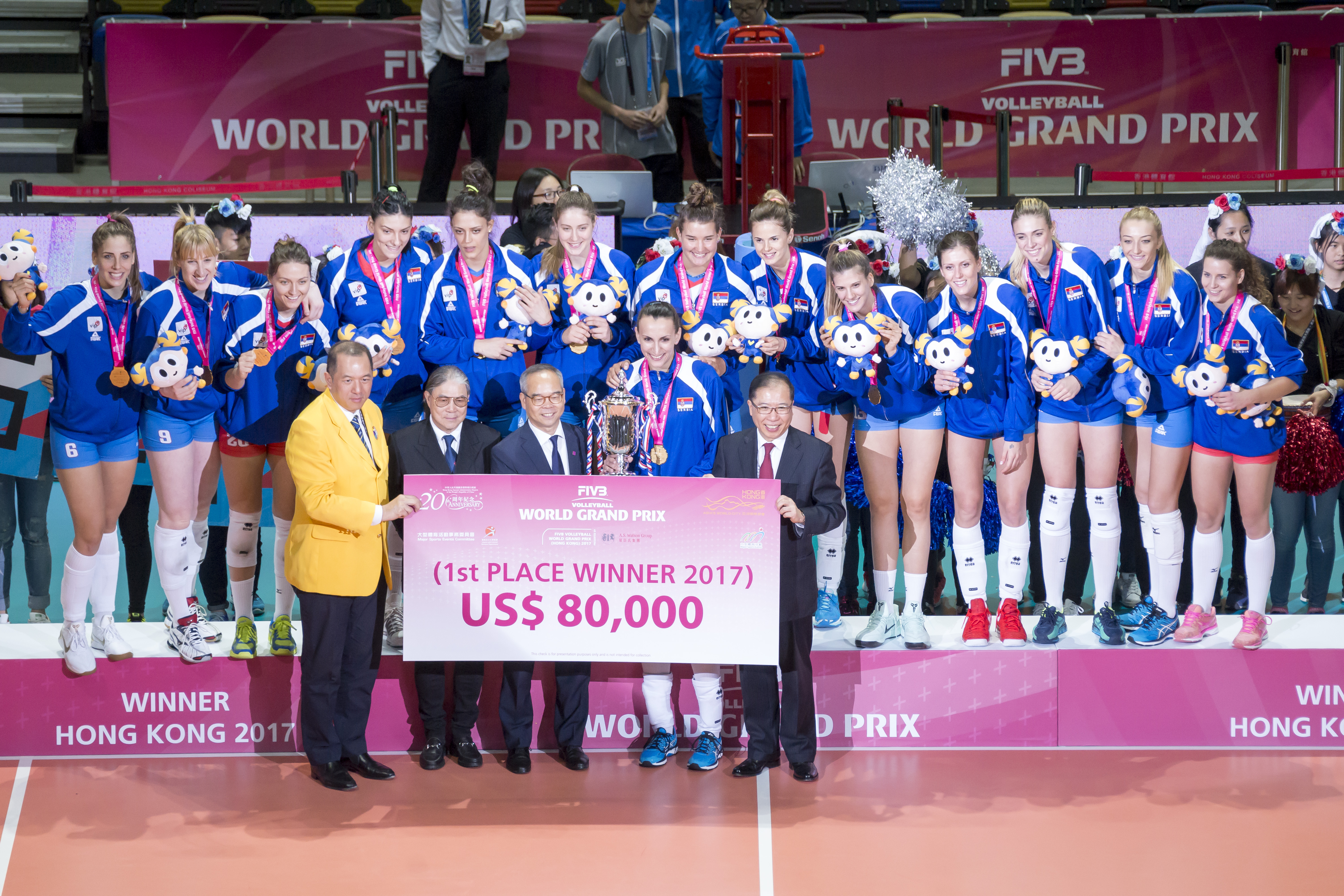
Grand Prix 2017, 1st place in Group 1

- 2006 World Championship — 3rd place
  Jelena Nikolić, Aleksandra Ranković, Ivana Đerisilo, Nataša Krsmanović, Jovana Brakočević, Brižitka Molnar, Jovana Vesović, Maja Ognjenović, Vesna Čitaković, Maja Simanić, Anja Spasojević, Suzana Ćebić. Head Coach: Zoran Terzić.
- 2007 European Championship — 2nd place
  Jelena Nikolić, Jasna Majstorović, Nataša Krsmanović, Jovana Brakočević, Brižitka Molnar, Jovana Vesović, Maja Ognjenović, Vesna Čitaković, Ivana Isailović, Maja Simanić, Anja Spasojević, Suzana Ćebić. Head Coach: Zoran Terzić.
- 2008 Olympics — 5th place
  Jovana Brakočević, Suzana Ćebić, Vesna Čitaković, Nataša Krsmanović, Ivana Đerisilo, Brižitka Molnar, Sanja Malagurski, Jelena Nikolić, Maja Ognjenović, Maja Simanić, Stefana Veljković, Jovana Vesović. Head Coach: Zoran Terzić.
- 2009 European Championship — 7th place
  Jelena Nikolić, Jovana Brakočević, Ivana Đerisilo, Nataša Krsmanović, Jasna Majstorović, Brižitka Molnar, Ana Antonijević, Jovana Vesović, Maja Ognjenović, Stefana Veljković, Milena Rašić, Aleksandra Petrović, Silvija Popović, Suzana Ćebić. Head Coach: Zoran Terzić.
- 2010 World Championship — 8th place
  Jelena Nikolić, Jovana Brakočević, Sanja Malagurski, Nataša Krsmanović, Jasna Majstorović, Brižitka Molnar, Ana Antonijević, Jovana Vesović, Maja Ognjenović, Stefana Veljković, Milena Rašić, Silvija Popović, Suzana Ćebić, Dragana Marinković. Head Coach: Zoran Terzić.
- 2011 FIVB Volleyball World Grand Prix — 3rd place
  Ana Lazarević, Jovana Brakočević, Sanja Malagurski, Nataša Krsmanović, Tijana Malešević, Brižitka Molnar, Ana Antonijević, Jovana Vesović, Maja Ognjenović, Jelena Nikolić, Nađa Ninković, Milena Rašić, Suzana Ćebić, Silvija Popović. Head Coach: Zoran Terzić.
- 2011 European Championship — 1st place
  Ana Lazarević, Jovana Brakočević, Sanja Malagurski, Nataša Krsmanović, Tijana Malešević, Brižitka Molnar, Ana Antonijević, Jovana Vesović, Maja Ognjenović, Jelena Nikolić, Nađa Ninković, Milena Rašić, Suzana Ćebić, Silvija Popović. Head Coach: Zoran Terzić.
- 2012 Olympics — 11th place
  Jovana Brakočević, Ivana Đerisilo, Bojana Živković, Nataša Krsmanović, Brankica Mihajlović, Jovana Vesović, Maja Ognjenović, Stefana Veljković, Milena Rašić, Suzana Ćebić, Sanja Starović, Jelena Blagojević. Head Coach: Zoran Terzić.
- 2013 FIVB Volleyball World Grand Prix — 3rd place
  Jovana Brakočević, Bojana Živković, Nataša Krsmanović, Tijana Malešević, Brižitka Molnar, Brankica Mihajlović, Maja Ognjenović, Stefana Veljković, Jelena Nikolić, Ana Bjelica, Nađa Ninković, Milena Rašić, Suzana Ćebić, Jasna Majstorović. Head Coach: Zoran Terzić.
- 2013 European Championship — 4th place
  Jovana Brakočević, Sanja Malagurski, Bojana Živković, Nataša Krsmanović, Tijana Malešević, Brižitka Molnar, Brankica Mihajlović, Maja Ognjenović, Stefana Veljković, Jelena Nikolić, Ana Bjelica, Milena Rašić, Suzana Ćebić, Jasna Majstorović. Head Coach: Zoran Terzić.
- 2014 World Championship — 7th place
  Jovana Brakočević, Bojana Živković, Nataša Krsmanović, Tijana Malešević, Brižitka Molnar, Brankica Mihajlović, Maja Ognjenović, Stefana Veljković, Jelena Nikolić, Nađa Ninković, Milena Rašić, Silvija Popović, Suzana Ćebić, Tijana Bošković. Head Coach: Zoran Terzić.
- 2015 FIVB Volleyball Women's World Cup — 2nd place
  Bianka Buša, Bojana Živković, Mina Popović, Tijana Malešević, Brankica Mihajlović, Maja Ognjenović, Stefana Veljković, Jelena Nikolić, Ana Bjelica, Jovana Stevanović, Milena Rašić, Silvija Popović, Suzana Ćebić, Tijana Bošković. Head Coach: Zoran Terzić.
- 2015 European Championship — 3rd place
  Bianka Buša, Bojana Živković, Mina Popović, Tijana Malešević, Brankica Mihajlović, Maja Ognjenović, Stefana Veljković, Jelena Nikolić, Ana Bjelica, Jovana Stevanović, Milena Rašić, Silvija Popović, Suzana Ćebić, Tijana Bošković. Head Coach: Zoran Terzić.
- 2016 Olympics — 2nd place
  Bianka Buša, Jovana Brakočević, Bojana Živković, Tijana Malešević, Brankica Mihajlović, Maja Ognjenović, Stefana Veljković, Jelena Nikolić, Jovana Stevanović, Milena Rašić, Silvija Popović, Tijana Bošković. Head Coach: Zoran Terzić.
- 2017 FIVB Volleyball World Grand Prix — 3rd place
  Bianka Buša, Sanja Malagurski, Bojana Živković, Tijana Malešević, Ana Antonijević, Brankica Mihajlović, Stefana Veljković, Teodora Pušić, Ana Bjelica, Jovana Stevanović, Milena Rašić, Tijana Bošković, Bojana Milenković, Jelena Blagojević. Head Coach: Zoran Terzić.
- 2017 European Championship — 1st place
  Bianka Buša, Bojana Živković, Mina Popović, Tijana Malešević, Brankica Mihajlović, Slađana Mirković, Stefana Veljković, Teodora Pušić, Ana Bjelica, Jovana Stevanović, Milena Rašić, Tijana Bošković, Bojana Milenković, Jelena Blagojević. Head Coach: Zoran Terzić.
- 2018 World Championship — 1st place
  Bianka Buša, Bojana Živković, Tijana Malešević, Brankica Mihajlović, Maja Ognjenović, Stefana Veljković, Teodora Pušić, Ana Bjelica, Maja Aleksić, Jovana Stevanović, Milena Rašić, Silvija Popović, Tijana Bošković, Bojana Milenković. Head Coach: Zoran Terzić.
- 2019 European Championship — 1st place
  Bianka Buša, Katarina Lazović, Mina Popović, Slađana Mirković, Brankica Mihajlović, Maja Ognjenović, Stefana Veljković, Teodora Pušić, Ana Bjelica, Maja Aleksić, Silvija Popović, Tijana Bošković, Bojana Milenković, Jelena Blagojević. Head Coach: Zoran Terzić.
- 2020 Olympics — 3rd place
  Bianka Buša, Mina Popović, Slađana Mirković, Brankica Mihajlović, Maja Ognjenović, Ana Bjelica, Maja Aleksić, Milena Rašić, Silvija Popović, Tijana Bošković, Bojana Milenković, Jelena Blagojević. Head Coach: Zoran Terzić.
- 2021 European Championship — 2nd place
  Bianka Buša, Katarina Lazović, Sara Carić, Mina Popović, Slađana Mirković, Maja Ognjenović, Stefana Veljković, Ana Bjelica, Milena Rašić, Silvija Popović, Tijana Bošković, Bojana Milenković, Jelena Blagojević, Jovana Kocić. Head Coach: Zoran Terzić.
- 2022 FIVB Volleyball Women's Nations League — 3rd place
  Bianka Buša, Katarina Lazović, Bojana Drča, Mina Popović, Slađana Mirković, Brankica Mihajlović, Teodora Pušić, Ana Bjelica, Maja Aleksić, Jovana Stevanović, Bojana Milenković, Sara Lozo, Jovana Kocić, Sanja Djurdjević. Head Coach: Daniele Santarelli
- 2022 World Championship — 1st place
  Bianka Buša, Katarina Lazović, Bojana Drča, Mina Popović, Slađana Mirković, Brankica Mihajlović, Teodora Pušić, Ana Bjelica, Maja Aleksić, Jovana Stevanović, Aleksandra Jegdić, Tijana Bošković, Bojana Milenković, Sara Lozo. Head Coach: Daniele Santarelli
- 2023 European Championship — 2nd place
  Bianka Buša, Katarina Lazović, Bojana Drča, Mina Popović, Aleksandra Uzelac, Maja Ognjenović, Hena Kurtagić, Teodora Pušić, Ana Bjelica, Maja Aleksić, Jovana Stevanović, Aleksandra Jegdić, Tijana Bošković, Sara Lozo. Head Coach: Giovanni Guidetti
- 2024 Olympics — 7th place
  Bianka Buša, Katarina Lazović, Bojana Drča, Mina Popović, Aleksandra Uzelac, Maja Ognjenović, Maja Aleksić, Jovana Stevanović, Silvija Popović, Tijana Bošković, Bojana Milenković, Sara Lozo. Head Coach: Giovanni Guidetti

=== Coaches ===
Name	From	Until
(Federal Republic of Yugoslavia) Darko Zakoč	1996	2001
(Serbia) Zoran Terzić	2002	2022
(Italy) Daniele Santarelli	2022	
(Italy) Giovanni Guidetti	2023	2024
(Serbia) Zoran Terzić	2024	present

== Kit providers ==
The table below shows the history of kit providers for the Serbia national volleyball team.

Period	Kit provider
2000–	Asics DAcapo
2017–	Peak Sport Products

=== Sponsorship ===
One of the main sponsors is Poštanska štedionica.

== See also ==
- Serbia men's national volleyball team
- Yugoslavia women's national volleyball team
- Yugoslavia men's national volleyball team
