= Duško Đurišić =

Montenegrin footballer (born 1977)

Personal information
- Date of birth: 20 December 1977 (age 48)
- Place of birth: Bar, SFR Yugoslavia
- Height: 1.90 m (6 ft 3 in)
- Position: Defender

Youth career
- Mornar

Senior career*
Years	Team	Apps	(Gls)
1994–2000	OFK Beograd	93	(3)
2001	Sion	26	(2)
2002–2003	Sedan	30	(1)
2004	Lokeren	12	(0)
2004–2005	Hapoel Petah Tikva	31	(2)
2005–2008	SC Paderborn	68	(3)
2008–2009	Apollon Limassol	22	(2)
2010	Vojvodina	7	(0)
Total		258	(11)
- * Club domestic league appearances and goals

Duško Đurišić (Cyrillic: Душко Ђуришић; born 20 December 1977) is a Montenegrin former professional footballer who played as a defender.

== Career ==
After spending seven years at OFK Beograd, Đurišić moved abroad to Switzerland and joined Sion in early 2001. He spent one year at the club, before transferring to French side Sedan in the 2002 winter transfer window. In the following period, Đurišić also played for Lokeren, Hapoel Petah Tikva, and SC Paderborn.

In the summer of 2008, Đurišić signed with Cypriot club Apollon Limassol. He spent one season there, scoring twice in 22 league appearances. In January 2010, Đurišić returned to Serbia to play for Vojvodina. He eventually retired at the end of the 2009–10 season.

== Personal life ==
Đurišić is married to Vesna Čitaković, a Serbian former professional volleyball player. Their son, Nikola Đurišić, is a basketball player.
