= Katarina Lazović =

Serbian volleyball player (born 1999)

Katarina Dangubić
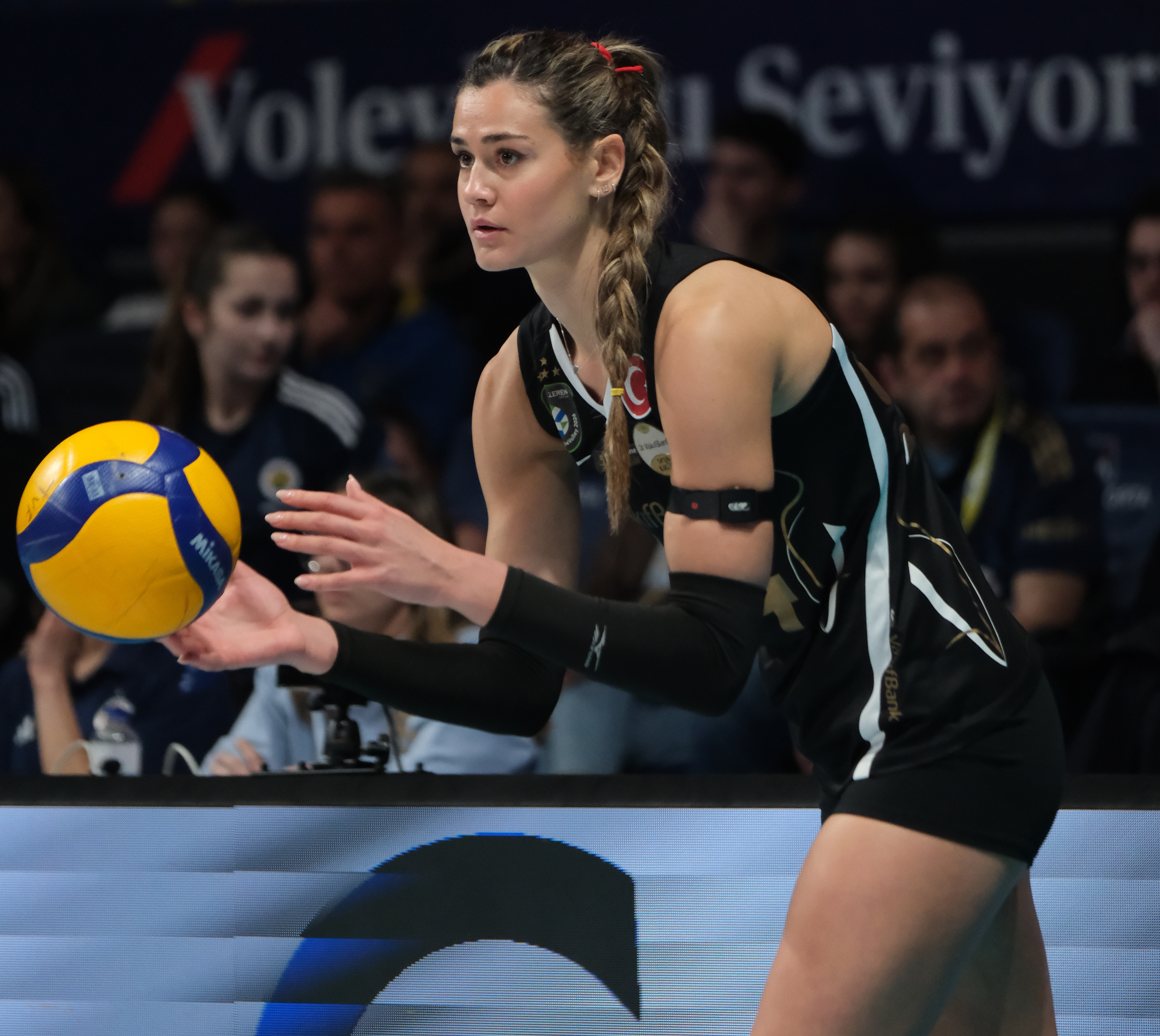
- Katarina Dangubić in 2026

Personal information
- Nationality: Serbian
- Born: 12 September 1999 (age 27); Belgrade, Serbia, FR Yugoslavia
- Height: 1.86 m (6 ft 1 in)
- Weight: 70 kg (154 lb)
- Spike: 310 cm (122 in)
- Block: 305 cm (120 in)

Volleyball information
- Position: Outside hitter
- Current club: VakıfBank

Career
Years	Teams
2014–2019	OK Vizura Belgrade
2019–2021	ŁKS Łódź
2021–2022	Pallavolo Monza
2022–2023	Beijing BAIC Motor
2023	Çukurova Belediyesi Spor Kulübü
2023–2024	Beijing BAIC Motor
2024–2025	Galatasaray
2025–	VakıfBank

National team
Serbia
Honours
World Championship
Gold medal – first place	2022 Netherlands/Poland	Team
European Championship
Gold medal – first place	2019 Turkey
Silver medal – second place	2021 Serbia/Croatia/Bulgaria/Romania
Silver medal – second place	2023 Belgium/Estonia/Germany/Italy
FIVB Nations League
Bronze medal – third place	2022 Ankara	Team

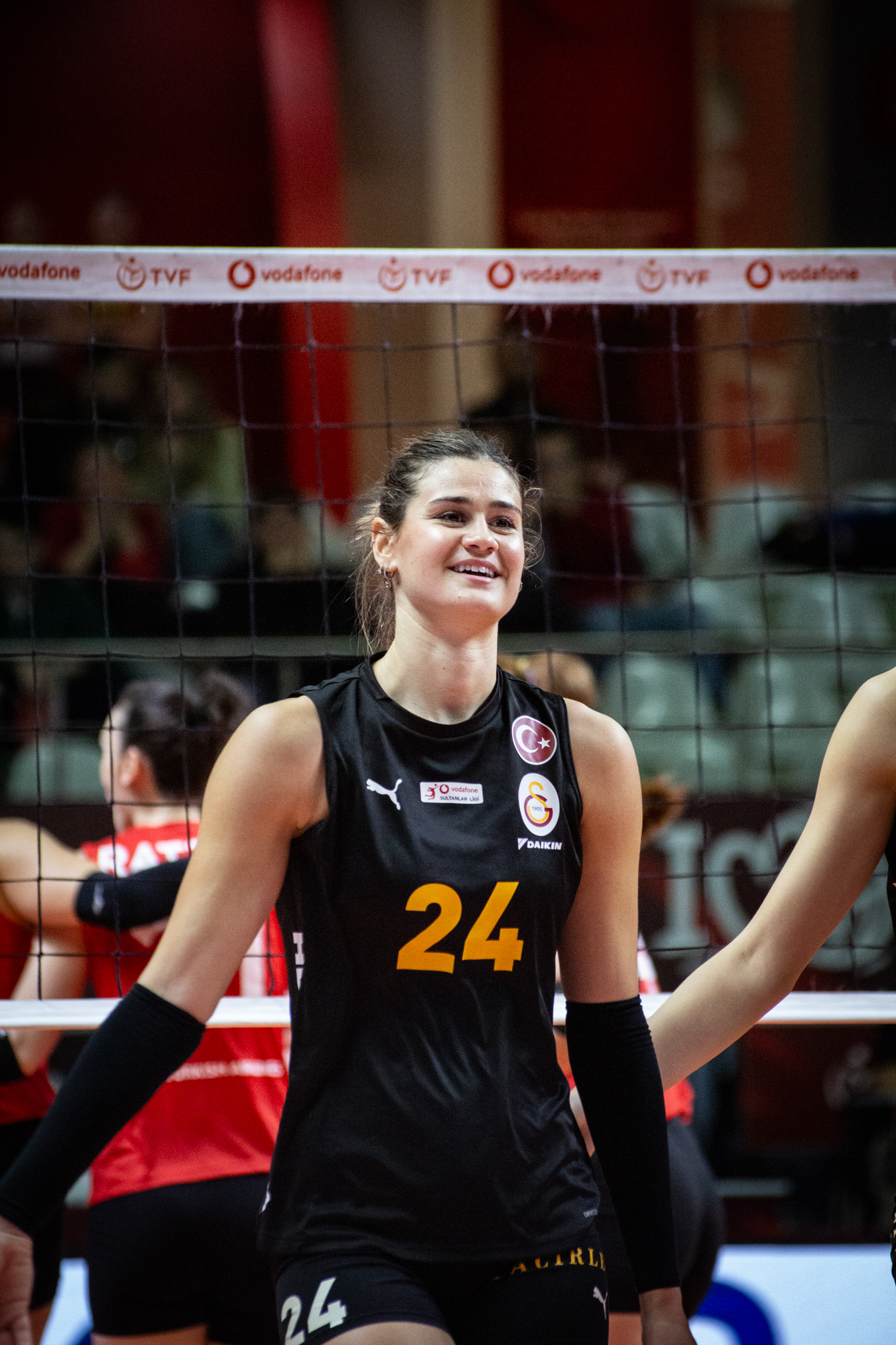
Katarina Dangubić in 2024

Katarina Dangubić (Serbian Cyrillic: Катарина Дангубић; née Lazović; born 12 September 1999) is a Serbian volleyball player, playing as wing spiker.

== Playing career ==
=== Club ===
She had played for OK Vizura Belgrade before continuing an international career in Poland in 2019 for ŁKS Łódź. From 2021 she joined Italian club Pallavolo Monza.

She signed a contract with Galatasaray on 10 February 2024, valid until the end of the season.

=== International ===
She is a member of the Serbia women's national volleyball team. She participated at the 2019 Women's European Volleyball Championship and winning gold medal.
