= Maja Simanić =

Serbian volleyball player (born 1980)

Personal information
- Born: 8 February 1980 (age 46)
- Height: 180 cm (5 ft 11 in)
- Weight: 70 kg (154 lb)
Medal record
Women's volleyball
Representing Serbia
World Championship
Bronze medal – third place	2006 Japan	Team
European Championship
Silver medal – second place	2007 Belgium-Luxembourg	Team

Maja Simanić (born 8 February 1980) is a volleyball player from Serbia, playing as a setter. She was a member of the Women's National Team that won the silver medal at the 2007 European Championship in Belgium and Luxembourg. At the 2006 FIVB Women's World Championship she claimed the bronze medal with Serbia.
