= Maja Aleksić =

Serbian volleyball player (born 1997)

Personal information
- Born: 6 June 1997 (age 29); Užice, FR Yugoslavia
- Height: 1.88 m (6 ft 2 in)
- Weight: 72 kg (159 lb)
- Spike: 302 cm (119 in)
- Block: 290 cm (114 in)

Volleyball information
- Position: Middle blocker
- Current club: Savino Del Bene Scandicci
- Number: 14 (NT), 8 (Club)

Career
Years	Teams
2011–2013	Jedinstvo Uzice
2013–2018	Vizura Ruma
2018–2021	CSM Volei Alba Blaj
2021–2022	Volero Le Cannet
2022–2023	Megabox Volley Vallefoglia
2023–2025	Igor Gorgonzola Novara
2025–2026	Zeren Spor Kulübü
2026–	Savino Del Bene Scandicci

National team
2015–	Serbia
Honours
Women's volleyball
Representing Serbia
Olympic Games
Bronze medal – third place	2020 Tokyo	Team
World Championship
Gold medal – first place	2018 Japan	Team
Gold medal – first place	2022 Netherlands/Poland	Team
European Championship
Gold medal – first place	2019 Hungary/Poland/Slovakia/Turkey
Silver medal – second place	2023 Belgium/Estonia/Germany/Italy
FIVB Nations League
Bronze medal – third place	2022 Ankara	Team

Maja Aleksić (Serbian Cyrillic: Маја Алексић; born 6 June 1997, Užice) is a Serbian volleyball player who plays as a middle blocker. She is currently a member of Serbian women's national volleyball team.

Aleksić competed in the 2018 FIVB Volleyball Women's Nations League, 2018 FIVB Volleyball Women's World Championship, 2019 FIVB Volleyball Women's Nations League, and 2019 FIVB Volleyball Women's World Cup.

Aleksić was part of the Serbian women's national volleyball team at the 2020 Tokyo Summer Olympics, where she won a bronze medal. With the national team, she also won the bronze medal at 2022 FIVB Volleyball Women's Nations League.
