= Vesna Čitaković =

Serbian volleyball player (born 1979)

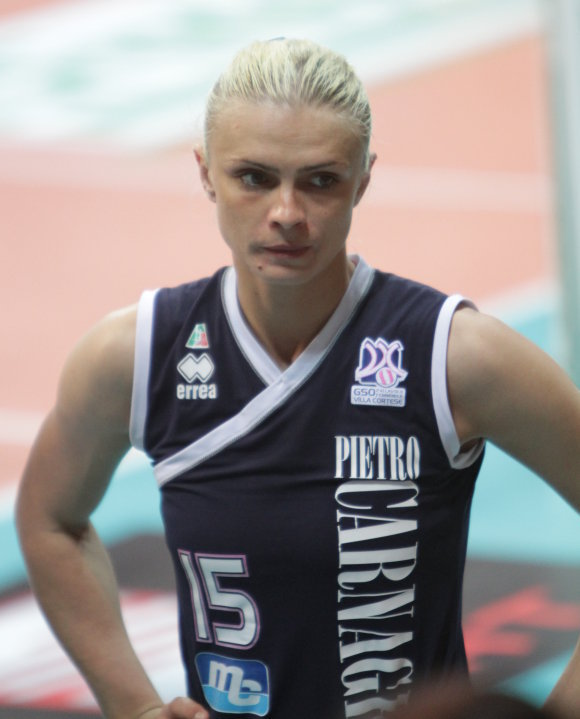

Personal information
- Full name: Vesna Čitaković
- Nationality: Serbian
- Born: 3 February 1979 (age 47); Titovo Užice, SR Serbia, SFR Yugoslavia
- Hometown: Istanbul, Turkey
- Height: 1.88 m (6 ft 2 in)
- Weight: 75 kg (165 lb)
- Spike: 305 cm (120 in)
- Block: 300 cm (120 in)

Volleyball information
- Position: Middle blocker

Career
Years	Teams
1995-2002; 2002-2003; 2004-2005; 2005-2006; 2006-2009; 2009; 2009-2010; 2010-2011; 2011-2012; 2012-2013; 2013-2014; 2014; 2015; 2015-2016; 2016	(Federal Republic of Yugoslavia) Jedinstvo Užice (Italy) Volley Modena (Israel) Raanana VBC (Germany) USC Münster (Turkey) Eczacıbaşı (Romania) Dinamo Romprest București (Italy) Villa Cortese (Turkey) Galatasaray Medical Park (Poland) Muszynianka Muszyna (Poland) Impel Wrocław (Turkey) Çanakkale Belediyespor (Turkey) Beşiktaş (Indonesia) Jakarta PGN Popsivo (Serbia) OK Crvena Zvezda (Italy) Volley Bergamo

National team
2000–2003; 2003–2006; 2006–2008	FR Yugoslavia; Serbia and Montenegro; Serbia
Honours
Women's volleyball
World Championship
Bronze medal – third place	2006 Japan	Team
European Championships
Silver medal – second place	2007 Belgium-Luxembourg	Team
- Last updated: 12 July 2010

Vesna Čitaković (Serbian Cyrillic: Весна Читаковић; born 3 February 1979) is a Serbian former professional volleyball player.

She was a member and captain of the women's national team that won the bronze medal at the 2006 World Championship in Japan and the silver medal at the 2007 European Championship in Belgium and Luxembourg. She signed for OK Crvena Zvezda in 2015. In March 2016, Čitaković signed for Volley Bergamo. She retired as a player with Bergamo in 2016.

== Personal life ==
She is married to a Montenegrin football player, Duško Đurišić. Their son, Nikola Đurišić, is a basketball player.
