= Ivana Đerisilo =

Serbian volleyball player (born 1983)

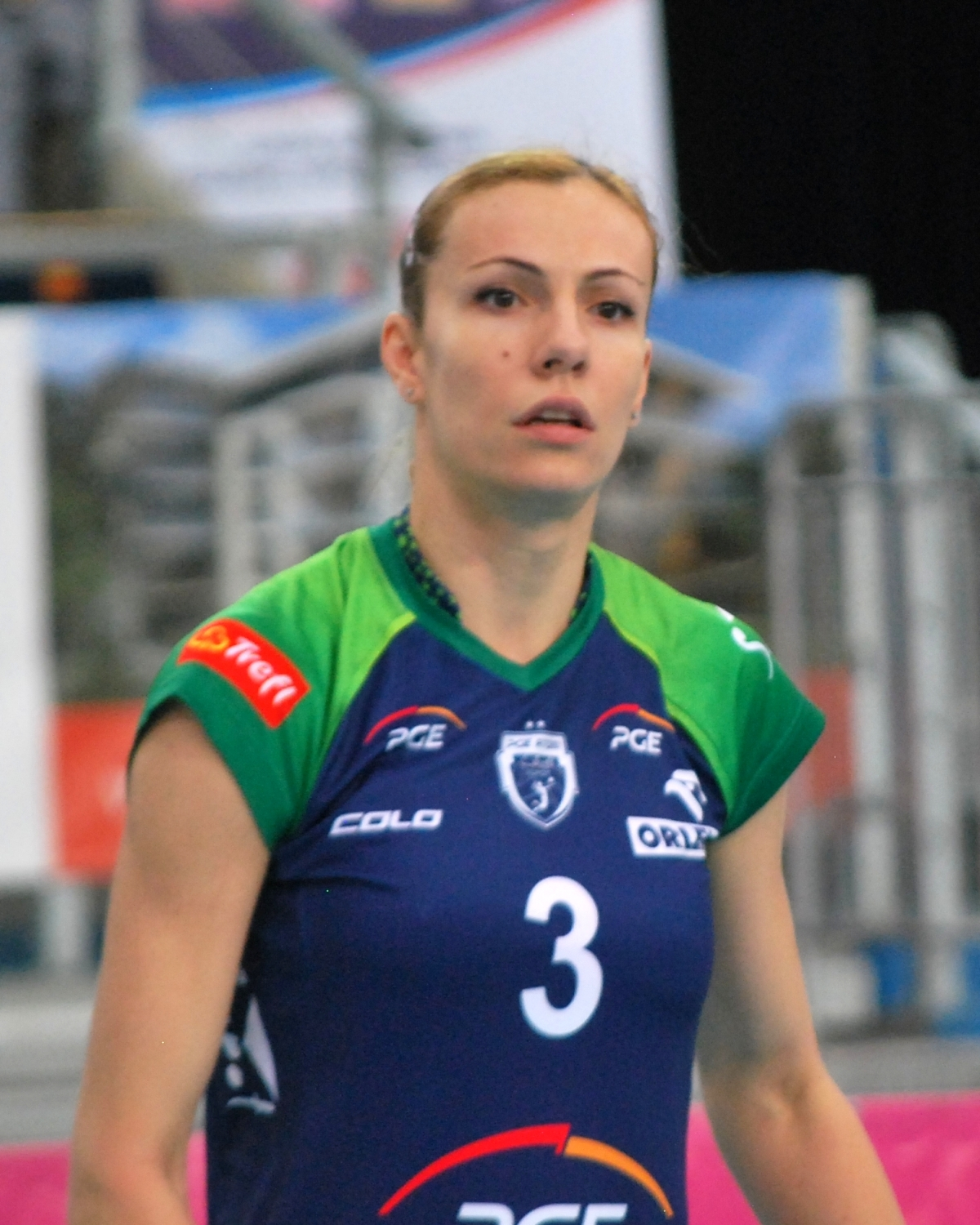
- Đerisilo in February 2016

Personal information
- Full name: Ivana Đerisilo-Stankovic
- Nationality: Serbian
- Born: 8 August 1983 (age 43); Belgrade, SR Serbia, SFR Yugoslavia
- Height: 1.85 m (6 ft 1 in)
- Weight: 72 kg (159 lb)
- Spike: 306 cm (120 in)
- Block: 291 cm (115 in)

Volleyball information
- Position: Outside hitter
- Current club: CSM Târgoviște
- Number: 19

Career
Years	Teams
2000-2004; 2004-2006; 2006-2007; 2007-2008; 2008-2009; 2009-2011; 2011-2012; 2012-2014; 2014-2015; 2015; 2015-2016; 2016-	OK Crvena zvezda Minetti Infoplus Vicenza; Eczacıbaşı; Voléro Zürich; Metal Galaţi; Galatasaray Medical Park; Volley Urbino; Inactive; Lokomotiv Baku; CS Volei Alba Blaj; OK Crvena zvezda CSM Târgoviște

National team
2000–2003; 2003–2006; 2006–2016	FR Yugoslavia; Serbia and Montenegro; Serbia
Honours
Women's volleyball
World Championship
Bronze medal – third place	2006 Japan	Team
Universiade
Silver medal – second place	2009 Belgrade	Team
- Last updated: 4 June 2010

Ivana Đerisilo-Stankovic (Serbian Cyrillic: Ивана Ђерисило; born 8 August 1983) is a volleyball player from Serbia, playing as an outside hitter. She was a member of the Women's National Team that won the bronze medal at the 2006 FIVB World Championship in Japan. She plays for the club CSM Târgoviște.
