= Slađana Mirković =

Serbian volleyball player

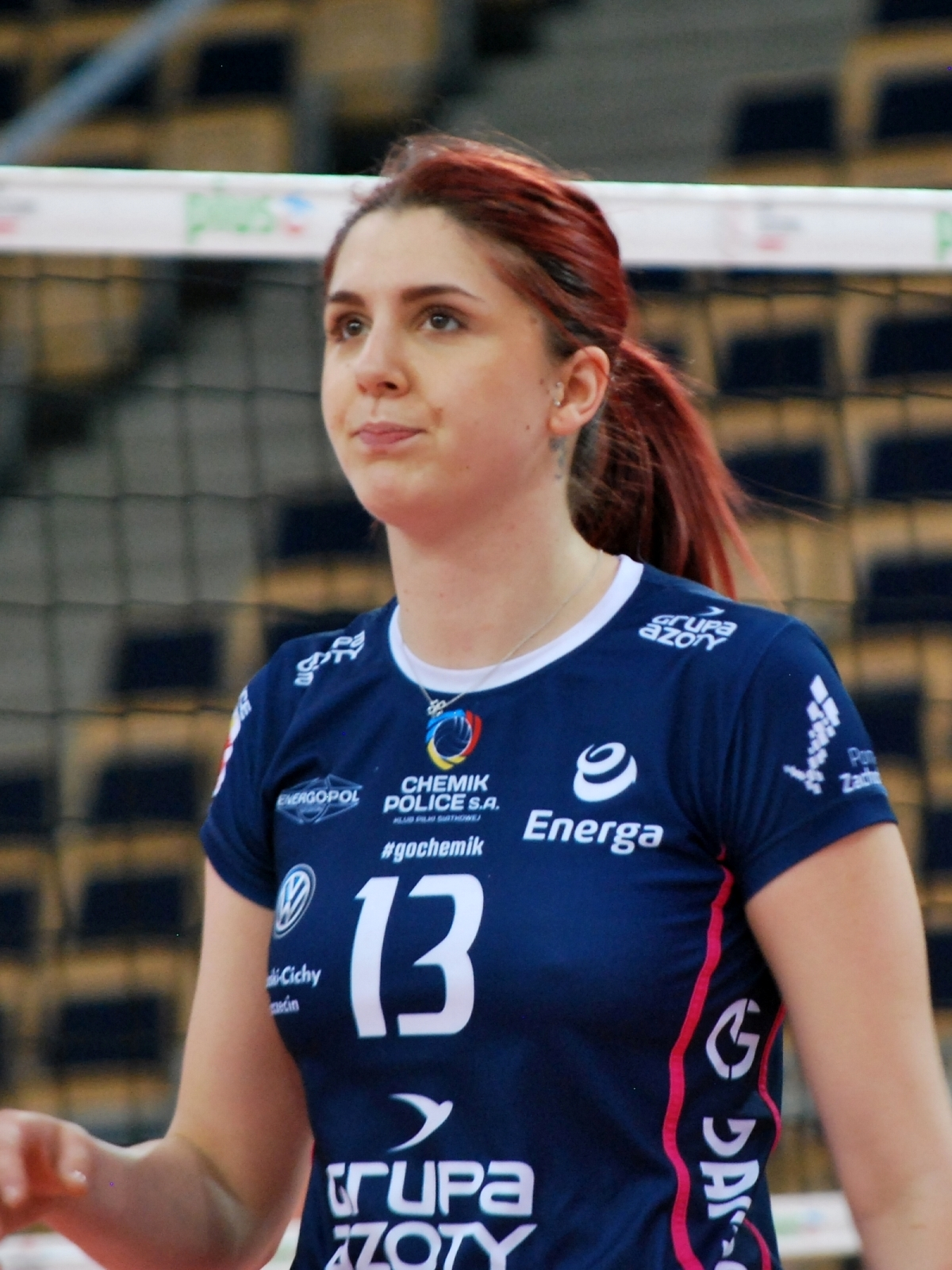
- Mirković playing for Chemik Police in April 2018

Personal information
- Nationality: Serbian
- Born: 7 October 1995 (age 31); Užice, Serbia, FR Yugoslavia
- Height: 1.85 m (6 ft 1 in)
- Weight: 74 kg (163 lb)
- Spike: 293 cm (115 in)
- Block: 282 cm (111 in)

Volleyball information
- Position: Setter
- Current club: Eczacıbaşı VitrA
- Number: 13

Career
Years	Teams
2012–2015; 2015–2016; 2016–2017; 2017–2019; 2019–2020; 2020–2021	(Serbia) Partizan Vizura (Serbia) Dinamo Azotara Pancevo (Azerbaijan) Telekom Baku (Poland) Chemik Police (Italy) Volley Bergamo (Turkey) Eczacıbaşı VitrA

National team
Serbia
Honours
Women's volleyball
Representing Serbia
Olympic Games
Bronze medal – third place	2020 Tokyo	Team
World Championship
Gold medal – first place	2022 Netherlands/Poland	Team
FIVB Nations League
Bronze medal – third place	2022 Ankara	Team
European Championship
Gold medal – first place	2017 Azerbaijan/Georgia
Gold medal – first place	2019 Turkey
Silver medal – second place	2021 Serbia/Bulgaria/Croatia/Romania
European Games
Bronze medal – third place	2015 Baku	Team

Slađana Mirković (born 7 October 1995 in Sevojno) is a Serbian volleyball player. She plays as a setter with the Italian team Volley Bergamo and is a member of Serbian women's national team. In 2017 she moved to Chemik Police from Telekom Baku.

She participated in the 2017 Women's European Volleyball Championship.
