= Aleksandra Ranković =

Serbian volleyball player

Personal information
- Full name: Aleksandra Ranković
- Born: July 8, 1980 (age 46)
- Height: 1.87 m (6 ft 2 in)

National team
Serbia
Honours
Women's volleyball
Representing Serbia and Montenegro
World Championship
Bronze medal – third place	2006 Japan	Team

Aleksandra Ranković (Serbian: Александра Ранковић; born July 8, 1980) is a volleyball player from Serbia. She was a member of the Serbia and Montenegro women's National Team that won the bronze medal at the 2006 World Championship in Japan.
