= Ana Antonijević =

Serbian volleyball player

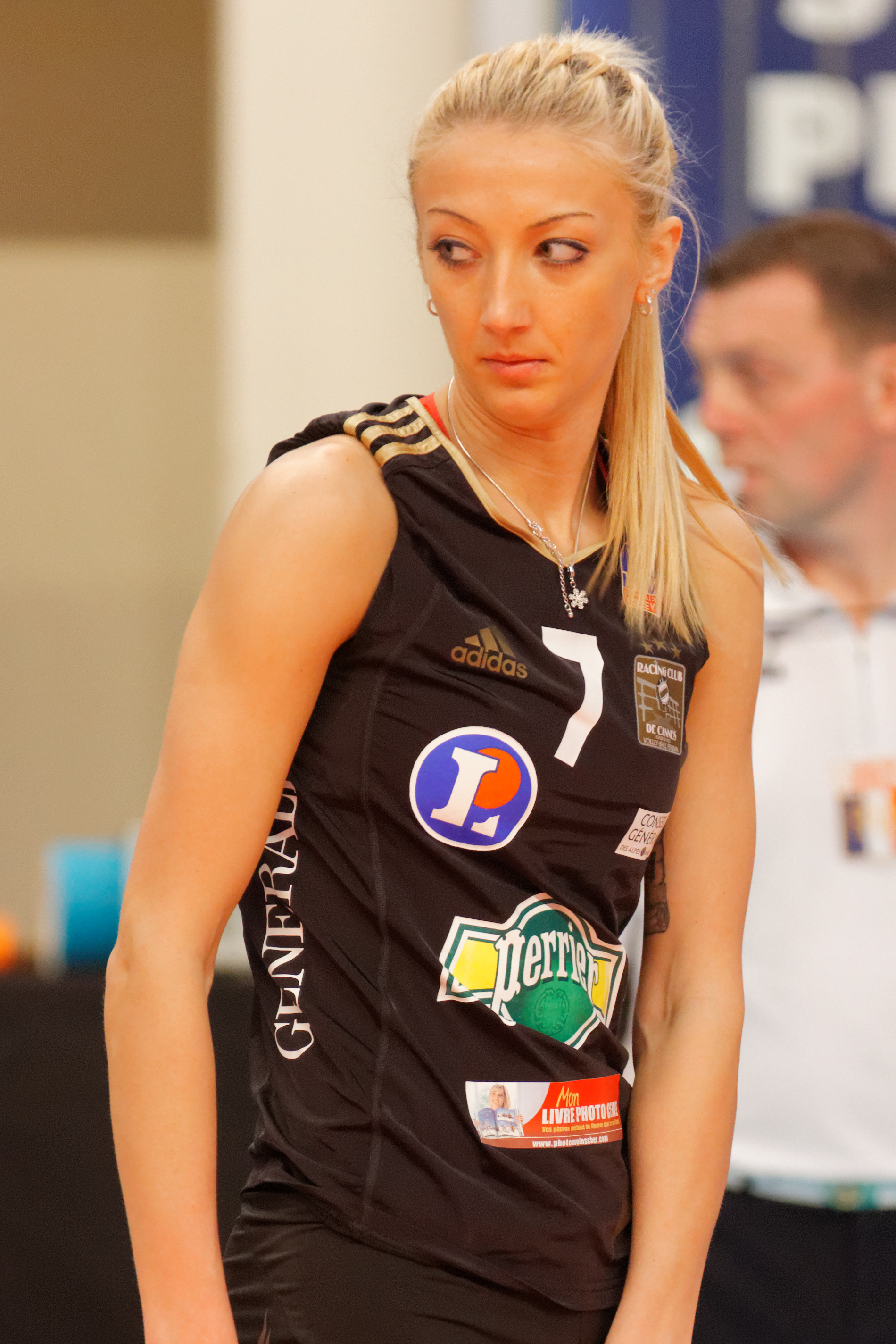
- Antonijević playing for RC Cannes in March 2013.

Personal information
- Nationality: Serbia
- Born: August 26, 1987 (age 39); Titovo Užice, SR Serbia, SFR Yugoslavia
- Height: 1.85 m (6 ft 1 in)
- Weight: 72 kg (159 lb)
- Spike: 282 cm (111 in)
- Block: 269 cm (106 in)

Volleyball information
- Position: Setter
- Current club: Fenerbahçe

Career
Years	Teams
2001-2007	OK Jedinstvo Užice
2007-2008	Voléro Zürich
2008-2009	Poštar 064 Beograd
2009-2014	RC Cannes
2015-2016	Voléro Zürich
2017	CSM Volei Alba Blaj
2018	Voléro Zürich
2018-	Fenerbahçe

National team
2006–	Serbia
Honours
Women's volleyball
Representing Serbia
European Championships
Gold medal – first place	2011 Serbia / Italy	Team
FIVB World Grand Prix
Bronze medal – third place	2011 Macau	Team
Bronze medal – third place	2017 Nanjing	Team
European League
Gold medal – first place	2011 Istanbul	Team
Universiade
Silver medal – second place	2007 Bangkok	Team competition
Silver medal – second place	2009 Belgrade	Team
- Last updated: 24 March 2018

Ana Antonijević (Serbian Cyrillic: Ана Антонијевић; born August 26, 1987) is a female professional volleyball player from Serbia. She was a member of the Serbia women's national volleyball team that won the gold medal at the 2011 European Championship in Serbia and Italy.

== Achievements ==
=== Clubs ===
- Switzerland volleyball league (1): 2007/08
- Serbian volleyball league (1): 2008/09
- French volleyball league (4): 2009/10, 2010/11, 2011/12, 2012/13, 2013/14
- Serbian Volleyball Cup (2): 2002/03, 2008/09
- Switzerland Volleyball Cup (1): 2008/09
- French Volleyball Cup (5): 2009/10, 2010/11, 2011/12, 2012/13, 2013/14
