= Aleksandra Avramović =

Serbian volleyball player (born 1982)

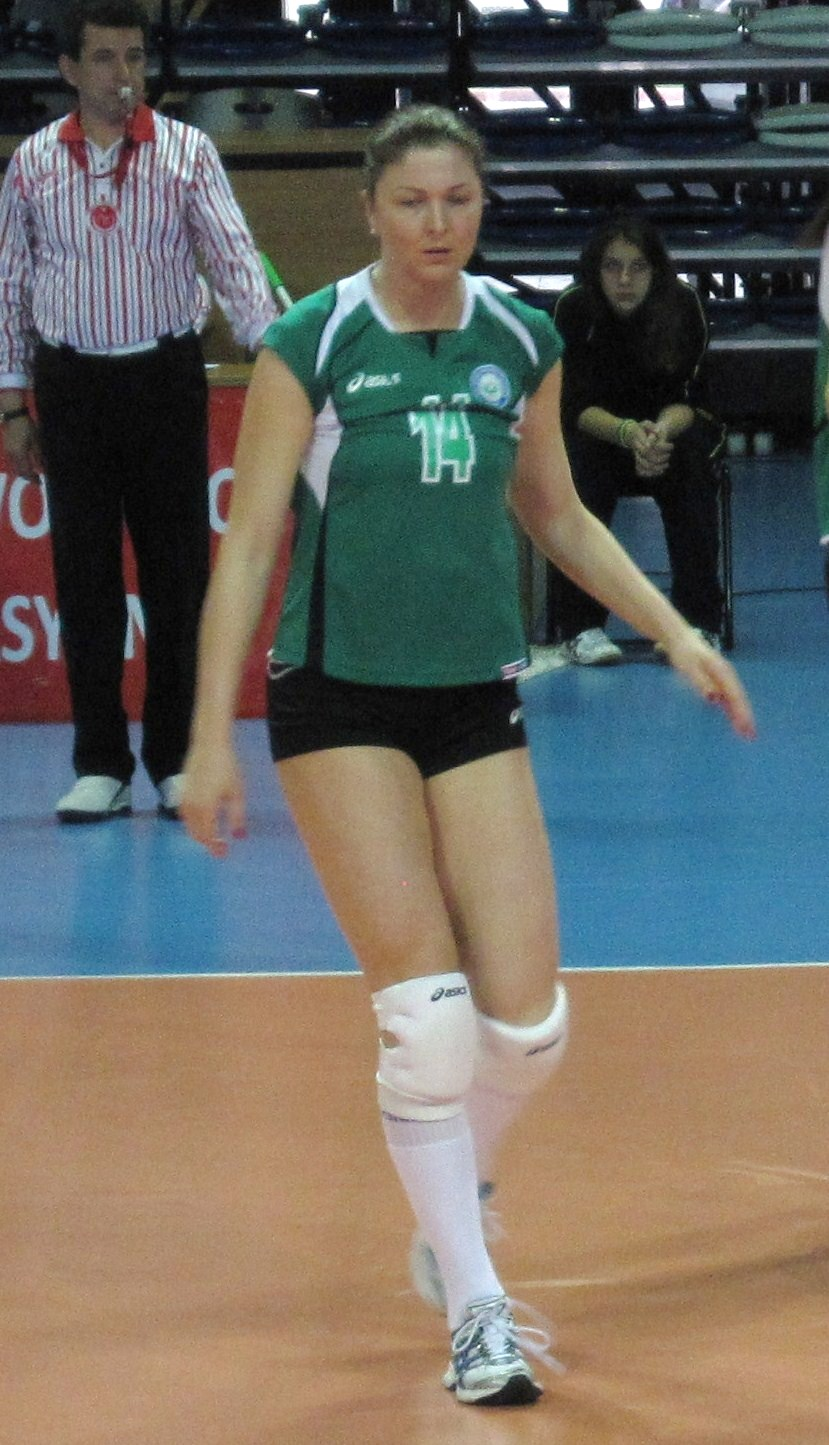

Personal information
- Nationality: Serbian
- Born: 3 July 1982 (age 44); Priboj, SR Serbia, SFR Yugoslavia
- Height: 189 cm (6 ft 2 in)
- Weight: 80 kg (176 lb)
- Spike: 309 cm (122 in)
- Block: 295 cm (116 in)

Volleyball information
- Position: Middle-blocker
- Number: 14 (national team)

Career
Years	Teams
2005	CSU Metal Galați

National team
2005	Serbia and Montenegro

Aleksandra Avramović (born 3 July 1982) is a Serbian former volleyball player, playing as a middle-blocker. She was part of the Serbia and Montenegro women's national volleyball team.

She competed at the 2005 Women's European Volleyball Championship. On club level she played for CSU Metal Galați in 2005.
