= Ivana Isailović =

Serbian volleyball player

Ivana Isailović Ивана Исаиловић

Personal information
- Full name: Ivana Isailović
- Nationality: Serbia
- Born: January 1, 1986 (age 40); Šabac, Yugoslavia
- Height: 1.85 m (6 ft 1 in)
- Weight: 66 kg (146 lb)
- Spike: 310 cm (120 in)
- Block: 295 cm (116 in)

Volleyball information
- Current club: VfB Suhl
- Number: 9

Career
| Years | Teams |
|---|---|
| 2006-2010 | OK Crvena Zvezda |
| 2010- | VfB Suhl |

National team
| Serbia |
Honours
Women's volleyball
Representing Serbia
European Championships
| Silver medal – second place | 2007 Belgium-Luxembourg | Team |
- Last updated: 26 July 2010

Ivana Isailović (Serbian: Ивана Исаиловић; born January 1, 1986, in Šabac, Yugoslavia) is a professional volleyball player from Serbia, who was a member of the Serbia women's national volleyball team that won the silver medal at the 2007 European Championship in Belgium and Luxembourg. She currently plays for Schweriner SC.
