= Volleyball at the 2009 Summer Universiade – Women's tournament =

The women's tournament of volleyball at the 2009 Summer Universiade at Belgrade, Serbia began on July 1 and ended on July 11.

== Teams ==
Africa	Americas	Asia	Europe	Oceania	Automatic qualifiers
	Brazil; Canada	China; Chinese Taipei; Japan; Mongolia; Thailand	Great Britain; Italy; Poland; Russia; Slovenia; Spain; Sweden; Turkey		Serbia– Universiade hosts

== Preliminary ==
=== Group A ===
Pos	Team	Pld	W	L	Pts	SPW	SPL	SPR	SW	SL	SR
1	Italy	3	3	0	6	279	219	1.274	9	3	3.000
2	Serbia	3	2	1	5	248	198	1.253	8	3	2.667
3	Brazil	3	1	2	4	221	227	0.974	4	6	0.667
4	Great Britain	3	0	3	3	121	225	0.538	0	9	0.000

Date		Score		Set 1	Set 2	Set 3	Set 4	Set 5	Total
3 July	Serbia	3–0	Great Britain	25:6	25:16	25:12			75:34
3 July	Brazil	1–3	Italy	20:25	26:24	20:25	21:25		87:99
4 July	Serbia	3–0	Brazil	25:19	25:23	25:17			75:59
4 July	Great Britain	0–3	Italy	11:25	13:25	10:25			34:75
5 July	Italy	3–2	Serbia	20:25	20:25	25:21	25:15	15:12	105:98
5 July	Brazil	3–0	Great Britain	25:20	25:15	25:18			75:53

=== Group B ===
Pos	Team	Pld	W	L	Pts	SPW	SPL	SPR	SW	SL	SR
1	Poland	3	3	0	6	252	176	1.432	9	1	9.000
2	Spain	3	2	1	5	211	219	0.963	6	5	1.200
3	Turkey	3	1	2	4	277	238	1.164	6	6	1.000
4	Mongolia	3	0	3	3	118	225	0.524	0	9	0.000

Date		Score		Set 1	Set 2	Set 3	Set 4	Set 5	Total
3 July	Mongolia	0–3	Poland	18:25	12:25	10:25			40:75
3 July	Spain	3–2	Turkey	11:25	26:24	25:23	17:25	15:11	94:108
4 July	Poland	3–1	Turkey	29:27	25:16	20:25	28:26		102:94
4 July	Mongolia	0–3	Spain	9:25	12:25	15:25			36:75
5 July	Spain	0–3	Poland	14:25	11:25	17:25			42:75
5 July	Turkey	3–0	Mongolia	25:11	25:20	25:11			75:42

=== Group C ===
Pos	Team	Pld	W	L	Pts	SPW	SPL	SPR	SW	SL	SR
1	China	3	3	0	6	225	123	1.829	9	0	MAX
2	Chinese Taipei	3	2	1	5	227	237	0.958	6	5	1.200
3	Slovenia	3	1	2	4	191	247	0.773	3	8	0.375
4	Canada	3	0	3	3	252	288	0.875	4	9	0.444

Date		Score		Set 1	Set 2	Set 3	Set 4	Set 5	Total
2 July	Chinese Taipei	3–0	Slovenia	25:14	25:20	25:20			75:54
2 July	Chinese Taipei	3–0	Canada	25:15	25:18	25:14			75:46
3 July	Slovenia	3–2	Canada	25:14	25:20	16:25	18:25	15:13	99:97
3 July	Chinese Taipei	0–3	China	12:25	15:25	11:25			38:75
5 July	China	3–0	Slovenia	25:11	25:19	25:8			75:38
5 July	Canada	2–3	Chinese Taipei	25:23	22:25	25:23	20:25	16:18	108:114

=== Group D ===
Pos	Team	Pld	W	L	Pts	SPW	SPL	SPR	SW	SL	SR
1	Russia	3	3	0	6	247	198	1.247	9	2	4.500
2	Japan	3	2	1	5	252	186	1.355	8	3	2.667
3	Thailand	3	1	2	4	194	249	0.779	3	8	0.375
4	Sweden	3	0	3	3	194	254	0.764	2	9	0.222

Date		Score		Set 1	Set 2	Set 3	Set 4	Set 5	Total
2 July	Russia	3–0	Thailand	25:14	25:15	25:17			75:46
2 July	Japan	3–0	Sweden	25:8	25:18	25:19			75:45
3 July	Thailand	3–2	Sweden	21:25	25:21	25:16	18:25	15:12	104:99
3 July	Russia	3–2	Japan	19:25	13:25	25:20	25:19	15:13	97:102
5 July	Japan	3–0	Thailand	25:17	25:20	25:7			75:44
5 July	Sweden	0–3	Russia	15:25	20:25	15:25			50:75

== Classification round ==
=== Classification 9-16 places ===
Date		Score		Set 1	Set 2	Set 3	Set 4	Set 5	Total
7 July	Slovenia	2–3	Great Britain	25:20	25:15	14:25	17:25	13:15	94:100
7 July	Turkey	3–2	Sweden	25:17	19:25	27:29	25:17	15:8	111:96
7 July	Brazil	3–0	Canada	25:21	25:20	25:14			75:55
7 July	Thailand	3–1	Mongolia	25:16	20:25	25:12	25:23		95:76

=== Classification 13-16 places ===
Date		Score		Set 1	Set 2	Set 3	Set 4	Set 5	Total
8 July	Slovenia	3–1	Sweden	23:25	26:24	25:16	25:20		99:85
8 July	Canada	3–0	Mongolia	25:10	25:15	25:15			75:40

=== Classification 9-12 places ===
Date		Score		Set 1	Set 2	Set 3	Set 4	Set 5	Total
8 July	Great Britain	1–3	Turkey	17:25	25:21	13:25	15:25		70:96
8 July	Brazil	3–0	Thailand	25:18	25:10	25:11			75:49

== Quarterfinals ==
Date		Score		Set 1	Set 2	Set 3	Set 4	Set 5	Total
7 July	China	1–3	Serbia	24:26	25:19	19:25	21:25		89:95
7 July	Poland	3–1	Japan	25:17	25:22	13:25	25:20		88:84
7 July	Italy	3–1	Chinese Taipei	18:25	25:9	25:13	25:18		93:65
7 July	Russia	3–1	Spain	17:25	25:18	25:19	26:24		93:86

=== Classification 5-8 places ===
Date		Score		Set 1	Set 2	Set 3	Set 4	Set 5	Total
8 July	China	3–1	Japan	19:25	25:23	25:16	25:20		94:84
8 July	Chinese Taipei	3–2	Spain	15:25	25:21	25:22	26:28	15:12	106:108

== Semifinals ==
Date		Score		Set 1	Set 2	Set 3	Set 4	Set 5	Total
8 July	Serbia	3–0	Poland	25:17	25:17	25:15			75:49
8 July	Italy	3–0	Russia	29:27	25:11	25:17			79:55

== Finals ==
=== Final 15-16 places ===
Date		Score		Set 1	Set 2	Set 3	Set 4	Set 5	Total
9 July	Sweden	3–0	Mongolia	25:20	25:18	25:23			75:61

=== Final 13-14 places ===
Date		Score		Set 1	Set 2	Set 3	Set 4	Set 5	Total
9 July	Slovenia	1–3	Canada	14:25	25:23	17:25	14:25		70:98

=== Final 11-12 places ===
Date		Score		Set 1	Set 2	Set 3	Set 4	Set 5	Total
9 July	Great Britain	0–3	Thailand	21:25	22:25	22:25			65:75

=== Final 9-10 places ===
Date		Score		Set 1	Set 2	Set 3	Set 4	Set 5	Total
9 July	Turkey	3–2	Brazil	21:25	25:20	19:25	25:18	15:9	105:97

=== Final 7-8 places ===
Date		Score		Set 1	Set 2	Set 3	Set 4	Set 5	Total
10 July	Japan	3–1	Spain	15:25	25:8	25:19	25:8		90:60

=== Final 5-6 places ===
Date		Score		Set 1	Set 2	Set 3	Set 4	Set 5	Total
10 July	China	3–0	Chinese Taipei	25:7	25:14	25:12			75:33

== Bronze-medal match ==
Date		Score		Set 1	Set 2	Set 3	Set 4	Set 5	Total
10 July	Poland	3–1	Russia	20:25	25:23	25:22	25:19		95:89

== Gold-medal match ==
Date		Score		Set 1	Set 2	Set 3	Set 4	Set 5	Total
10 July	Serbia	2–3	Italy	25:20	16:25	25:21	14:25	9:15	89:106

== Final standings ==
Place	Team	Score
1st place, gold medalist(s)	Italy	6–0
2nd place, silver medalist(s)	Serbia	4–2
3rd place, bronze medalist(s)	Poland	5–1
4	Russia	4–2
5	China	5–1
6	Chinese Taipei	3–3
7	Japan	3–3
8	Spain	2–4
9	Turkey	4–2
10	Brazil	3–3
11	Thailand	3–3
12	Great Britain	1–5
13	Canada	2–4
14	Slovenia	2–4
15	Sweden	1–5
16	Mongolia	0–6
