= 2009 Women's European Volleyball League =

European volleyball tournament

Tournament details
- Host country: Turkey
- Dates: May 22 – June 28 (qualification); July 11 – 12 (final four)
- Teams: 8
- Venue: 1 (in 1 host city)

Final positions
- Champions: Serbia (1st title)

Tournament awards
- MVP: (Turkey) Neslihan Darnel

The 2009 Women's European Volleyball League was the first edition of the annual women's volleyball tournament, played by eight European countries from May 22 to June 28, 2009. The final Four was held in Kayseri, Turkey from July 11 to July 12.

== Competing nations ==
Group A	Group B
Bulgaria; Greece; Serbia; Spain	France; Great Britain; Romania; Turkey

== League round ==
=== Pool A ===
Pos	Team	Pld	W	L	Pts	SW	SL	SR	SPW	SPL	SPR	Qualification
1	Serbia	12	10	2	22	33	11	3.000	1030	874	1.178	Final Four
2	Bulgaria	12	7	5	19	27	23	1.174	1110	1005	1.104	Final Four
3	Spain	12	6	6	18	23	21	1.095	970	963	1.007	
4	Greece	12	1	11	13	7	35	0.200	755	1023	0.738	

==== Leg 1 ====
Date		Score		Set 1	Set 2	Set 3	Set 4	Set 5	Total
23 May	Bulgaria	0–3	Spain	23:25	20:25	20:25			63:75
23 May	Serbia	3–0	Greece	25:21	25:14	25:15			75:50
24 May	Bulgaria	3–1	Spain	25:21	25:17	19:25	30:28		99:91
24 May	Serbia	3–1	Greece	20:25	25:23	25:20	25:20		95:88

==== Leg 2 ====
Date		Score		Set 1	Set 2	Set 3	Set 4	Set 5	Total
29 May	Spain	3–0	Greece	25:13	25:22	25:19			75:54
30 May	Bulgaria	1–3	Serbia	25:16	24:26	16:25	17:25		83:92
30 May	Spain	3–0	Greece	25:20	25:19	25:16			75:55
31 May	Bulgaria	3–2	Serbia	25:21	21:25	25:18	22:25	18:16	111:105

==== Leg 3 ====
Date		Score		Set 1	Set 2	Set 3	Set 4	Set 5	Total
5 June	Serbia	3–0	Spain	25:12	25:15	30:28			80:55
5 June	Greece	2–3	Bulgaria	11:25	27:25	25:23	9:25	10:15	82:113
6 June	Serbia	3–0	Spain	25:23	25:15	25:19			75:57
6 June	Greece	1–3	Bulgaria	16:25	19:25	25:23	17:25		77:98

==== Leg 4 ====
Date		Score		Set 1	Set 2	Set 3	Set 4	Set 5	Total
12 June	Spain	3–1	Serbia	23:25	25:18	25:23	25:18		98:84
13 June	Bulgaria	3–0	Greece	25:12	25:14	25:11			75:37
13 June	Spain	0–3	Serbia	15:25	20:25	17:25			52:75
14 June	Bulgaria	3–0	Greece	25:19	25:12	25:16			75:47

==== Leg 5 ====
Date		Score		Set 1	Set 2	Set 3	Set 4	Set 5	Total
19 June	Greece	3–2	Spain	25:23	36:34	15:25	21:25	15:10	112:117
19 June	Serbia	3–1	Bulgaria	25:21	25:21	21:25	27:25		98:92
20 June	Greece	0–3	Spain	22:25	23:25	22:25			67:75
20 June	Serbia	3–2	Bulgaria	25:20	19:25	26:24	16:25	15:8	101:102

==== Leg 6 ====
Date		Score		Set 1	Set 2	Set 3	Set 4	Set 5	Total
26 June	Spain	3–2	Bulgaria	22:25	25:20	14:25	25:14	15:8	101:92
26 June	Greece	0–3	Serbia	11:25	14:25	9:25			34:75
27 June	Spain	2–3	Bulgaria	25:23	20:25	18:25	25:19	11:15	99:107
27 June	Greece	0–3	Serbia	17:25	20:25	15:25			52:75

=== Pool B ===
Pos	Team	Pld	W	L	Pts	SW	SL	SR	SPW	SPL	SPR	Qualification
1	Turkey	12	10	2	22	32	11	2.909	1028	867	1.186	Final Four
2	France	12	7	5	19	25	18	1.389	972	884	1.100	Final Four
3	Romania	12	7	5	19	25	20	1.250	972	960	1.013	
4	Great Britain	12	0	12	12	3	36	0.083	703	964	0.729	

==== Leg 1 ====
Date		Score		Set 1	Set 2	Set 3	Set 4	Set 5	Total
22 May	Romania	3–2	Turkey	14:25	25:20	15:25	25:18	15:12	94:100
23 May	France	3–0	Great Britain	25:22	25:12	25:11			75:45
23 May	Romania	3–0	Turkey	25:22	25:23	25:12			75:57
24 May	France	3–0	Great Britain	25:21	25:18	25:18			75:57

==== Leg 2 ====
Date		Score		Set 1	Set 2	Set 3	Set 4	Set 5	Total
30 May	Great Britain	1–3	Turkey	17:25	25:21	17:25	23:25		82:96
30 May	France	3–0	Romania	25:16	25:14	25:23			75:53
31 May	Great Britain	0–3	Turkey	15:25	18:25	20:25			53:75
31 May	France	3–1	Romania	27:25	25:15	19:25	25:19		96:84

==== Leg 3 ====
Date		Score		Set 1	Set 2	Set 3	Set 4	Set 5	Total
6 June	Romania	3–0	Great Britain	25:21	25:17	25:11			75:49
6 June	Turkey	3–1	France	25:21	24:26	25:16	25:18		99:81
7 June	Romania	3–0	Great Britain	25:12	25:23	25:22			75:57
7 June	Turkey	3–0	France	25:20	25:17	27:25			77:62

==== Leg 4 ====
Date		Score		Set 1	Set 2	Set 3	Set 4	Set 5	Total
12 June	France	0–3	Turkey	21:25	20:25	23:25			64:75
13 June	Great Britain	1–3	Romania	21:25	23:25	25:20	20:25		89:95
13 June	France	1–3	Turkey	15:25	17:25	27:25	24:26		83:101
14 June	Great Britain	0–3	Romania	17:25	13:25	21:25			51:75

==== Leg 5 ====
Date		Score		Set 1	Set 2	Set 3	Set 4	Set 5	Total
20 June	Turkey	3–1	Great Britain	25:22	23:25	25:20	25:22		98:89
20 June	Romania	2–3	France	25:22	23:25	15:25	25:22	7:15	95:109
21 June	Turkey	3–0	Great Britain	25:11	25:12	25:14			75:37
21 June	Romania	3–2	France	14:25	25:20	25:16	22:25	18:16	104:102

==== Leg 6 ====
Date		Score		Set 1	Set 2	Set 3	Set 4	Set 5	Total
27 June	Great Britain	0–3	France	19:25	18:25	16:25			53:75
27 June	Turkey	3–0	Romania	25:22	25:19	30:28			80:69
28 June	Great Britain	0–3	France	21:25	11:25	9:25			41:75
28 June	Turkey	3–1	Romania	20:25	25:16	25:18	25:19		95:78

== Final four ==
Qualified teams

- Turkey, as host
- Serbia
- Bulgaria
- France

Semi-finals
2009-07-11 – Kayseri
Serbia	3
France	2
2009-07-11 – Kayseri
Turkey	3
Bulgaria	1

Final
2009-07-12 – Kayseri
Serbia	3
Turkey	2
3rd place
2009-07-12 – Kayseri
France	0
Bulgaria	3

=== Semifinals ===
Date		Score		Set 1	Set 2	Set 3	Set 4	Set 5	Total
11 July	Serbia	3–2	France	25:21	25:15	21:25	18:25	15:10	104:96
11 July	Turkey	3–1	Bulgaria	25:13	26:24	24:26	25:21		100:84

=== Bronze medal match ===
Date		Score		Set 1	Set 2	Set 3	Set 4	Set 5	Total
12 July	France	0–3	Bulgaria	23:25	23:25	24:26			70:76

=== Gold Medal match ===
Date		Score		Set 1	Set 2	Set 3	Set 4	Set 5	Total
12 July	Serbia	3–2	Turkey	32:34	17:25	25:20	25:23	17:15	116:117

== Final ranking ==
Place	Team
1.	Serbia
2.	Turkey
3.	Bulgaria
4.	France
5.	Romania
5.	Spain
7.	Greece
7.	Great Britain

2009 Women's European League winners

Serbia
First title

== Individual awards ==
- Most valuable player:
  - Neslihan Demir Darnel (TUR)
- Best spiker:
  - Aleksandra Petrović (SRB)
- Best blocker:
  - Nađa Ninković (SRB)
- Best server:
  - Myriam Kloster (FRA)
- Best libero:
  - Mariya Filipova (BUL)
- Best setter:
  - Pelin Çelik (TUR)
- Best scorer:
  - Neslihan Demir Darnel (TUR)
