= 2010 Women's European Volleyball League =

European volleyball tournament

Tournament details
- Host country: Turkey
- Dates: June 5 – July 18 (qualification); July 24 – 25 (final four)
- Teams: 8
- Venue: 1 (in 1 host city)

Final positions
- Champions: Serbia (2nd title)

Tournament awards
- MVP: (Serbia) Jelena Nikolić

The 2010 Women's European Volleyball League was the second edition of the annual women's volleyball tournament, played by eight European countries from June 5 to July 18, 2010. The final Four were held in Ankara, Turkey, on July 24 and 25.

== Competing nations ==
Group A	Group B
Serbia; Great Britain; Romania; Bulgaria	Israel; Greece; Spain; Turkey

== League round ==
=== Pool A ===
Pos	Team	Pld	W	L	Pts	SW	SL	SR	SPW	SPL	SPR	Qualification
1	Serbia	12	11	1	23	34	6	5.667	969	775	1.250	Semifinals
2	Bulgaria	12	9	3	21	30	12	2.500	988	877	1.127	Semifinals
3	Romania	12	4	8	16	13	25	0.520	829	869	0.954	Eliminated
4	Great Britain	12	0	12	12	2	36	0.056	682	947	0.720	Eliminated

==== Leg 1 ====
Date		Score		Set 1	Set 2	Set 3	Set 4	Set 5	Total
5 June	Great Britain	0–3	Romania	19–25	15–25	15–25			49–75
6 June	Great Britain	0–3	Romania	22–25	20–25	20–25			62–75

==== Leg 2 ====
Date		Score		Set 1	Set 2	Set 3	Set 4	Set 5	Total
11 June	Serbia	3–0	Great Britain	25–16	25–18	25–19			75–53
11 June	Romania	0–3	Bulgaria	15–25	23–25	18–25			56–75
12 June	Serbia	3–0	Great Britain	25–21	25–16	25–14			75–51
12 June	Romania	0–3	Bulgaria	22–25	26–28	22–25			70–75

==== Leg 3 ====
Date		Score		Set 1	Set 2	Set 3	Set 4	Set 5	Total
19 June	Great Britain	0–3	Bulgaria	14–25	14–25	14–25			42–75
19 June	Serbia	3–0	Romania	25–18	25–21	25–19			75–58
20 June	Great Britain	0–3	Bulgaria	13–25	23–25	14–25			50–75
20 June	Serbia	3–0	Romania	25–19	25–20	25–23			75–62

==== Leg 4 ====
Date		Score		Set 1	Set 2	Set 3	Set 4	Set 5	Total
25 June	Romania	3–1	Great Britain	25–18	25–16	23–25	25–22		98–81
25 June	Serbia	3–2	Bulgaria	25–13	25–23	22–25	20–25	15–12	107–98
26 June	Romania	3–0	Great Britain	25–22	25–11	25–14			75–47
26 June	Serbia	1–3	Bulgaria	26–24	19–25	20–25	18–25		83–99

==== Leg 5 ====
Date		Score		Set 1	Set 2	Set 3	Set 4	Set 5	Total
1 July	Bulgaria	3–0	Romania	25–21	25–19	25–17			75–57
2 July	Bulgaria	3–1	Romania	25–20	25–22	26–28	26–24		102–94
3 July	Great Britain	0–3	Serbia	15–25	11–25	20–25			46–75
4 July	Great Britain	0–3	Serbia	19–25	20–25	23–25			62–75

==== Leg 6 ====
Date		Score		Set 1	Set 2	Set 3	Set 4	Set 5	Total
9 July	Romania	0–3	Serbia	22–25	18–25	12–25			52–75
10 July	Bulgaria	3–1	Great Britain	25–22	24–26	25–16	25–21		99–85
10 July	Romania	0–3	Serbia	18–25	19–25	20–25			57–75
11 July	Bulgaria	3–0	Great Britain	25–18	25–18	25–18			75–54

==== Leg 7 ====
Date		Score		Set 1	Set 2	Set 3	Set 4	Set 5	Total
17 July	Bulgaria	0–3	Serbia	16–25	20–25	14–25			50–75
18 July	Bulgaria	1–3	Serbia	20–25	15–25	31–29	21–25		87–104

=== Pool B ===
Pos	Team	Pld	W	L	Pts	SW	SL	SR	SPW	SPL	SPR	Qualification
1	Turkey	12	9	3	21	29	14	2.071	858	729	1.177	Semifinals
2	Israel	12	8	4	20	30	16	1.875	863	827	1.044	Semifinals
3	Spain	12	6	6	18	23	23	1.000	1000	1011	0.989	Eliminated
4	Greece	12	1	11	13	9	35	0.257	889	1033	0.861	Eliminated

==== Leg 1 ====
Date		Score		Set 1	Set 2	Set 3	Set 4	Set 5	Total
11 June	Israel	3–1	Greece	25–20	19–25	25–16	25–19		94–80
11 June	Spain	2–3	Turkey	14–25	25–21	16–25	25–19	11–15	91–105
12 June	Israel	3–0	Greece	25–21	25–23	25–21			75–65
12 June	Spain	2–3	Turkey	25–17	21–25	12–25	25–18	8–15	91–100

==== Leg 2 ====
Date		Score		Set 1	Set 2	Set 3	Set 4	Set 5	Total
18 June	Greece	3–2	Turkey	25–19	19–25	25–21	25–27	15–12	109–104
18 June	Spain	3–2	Israel	25–12	26–24	19–25	19–25	21–19	110–105
19 June	Greece	0–3	Turkey	18–25	20–25	10–25			48–75
19 June	Spain	3–1	Israel	24–26	25–19	28–26	25–18		102–89

==== Leg 3 ====
Date		Score		Set 1	Set 2	Set 3	Set 4	Set 5	Total
26 June	Spain	3–0	Greece	25–13	25–18	25–23			75–54
26 June	Turkey	3–0	Israel						
27 June	Spain	3–2	Greece	25–14	19–25	18–25	31–29	15–11	108–104
27 June	Turkey	3–0	Israel						

==== Leg 4 ====
Date		Score		Set 1	Set 2	Set 3	Set 4	Set 5	Total
2 July	Israel	3–0	Turkey						
3 July	Greece	0–3	Spain	21–25	22–25	24–26			67–76
3 July	Israel	3–0	Turkey						
4 July	Greece	0–3	Spain	24–26	24–26	14–25			62–77

==== Leg 5 ====
Date		Score		Set 1	Set 2	Set 3	Set 4	Set 5	Total
9 July	Israel	3–1	Spain	25–22	20–25	25–22	25–17		95–86
10 July	Turkey	3–1	Greece	21–25	25–12	25–17	25–17		96–71
10 July	Israel	3–0	Spain	25–19	25–21	27–25			77–65
11 July	Turkey	3–0	Greece	25–17	25–23	25–20			75–60

==== Leg 6 ====
Date		Score		Set 1	Set 2	Set 3	Set 4	Set 5	Total
16 July	Greece	2–3	Israel	25–22	25–15	24–26	22–25	12–15	108–103
17 July	Turkey	3–0	Spain	25–21	25–18	28–26			78–65
17 July	Greece	0–3	Israel	21–25	21–25	19–25			61–75
18 July	Turkey	3–0	Spain	25–19	25–15	25–20			75–54

== Final four ==
The final Four will be held at Başkent Volleyball Hall in Ankara, Turkey, from July 24 to July 25.

Qualified teams

- Turkey, as host
- Bulgaria
- Serbia
- Israel

Semi-finals
July 24 – Ankara
Israel	0
Serbia	3
July 24 – Ankara
Turkey	2
Bulgaria	3

Final
July 25 – Ankara
Serbia	3
Bulgaria	1
3rd place
July 25 – Ankara
Israel	0
Turkey	3

=== Semifinals ===
Date		Score		Set 1	Set 2	Set 3	Set 4	Set 5	Total
24 July	Israel	0–3	Serbia	20–25	12–25	21–25			53–75
24 July	Turkey	2–3	Bulgaria	19–25	17–25	25–11	25–23	13–15	99–99

=== Bronze medal match ===
Date		Score		Set 1	Set 2	Set 3	Set 4	Set 5	Total
25 July	Israel	0–3	Turkey	19–25	23–25	15–25			57–75

=== Final ===
Date		Score		Set 1	Set 2	Set 3	Set 4	Set 5	Total
25 July	Serbia	3–1	Bulgaria	25–20	25–20	16–25	25–23		91–88

== Final standing ==
Rank	Team
1st place, gold medalist(s)	Serbia
2nd place, silver medalist(s)	Bulgaria
3rd place, bronze medalist(s)	Turkey
4	Israel
5	Spain
6	Romania
7	Greece
8	Great Britain

2010 Women's European League winners

Serbia
Second title

== Awards ==
- MVP: (Serbia) Jelena Nikolić
- Best scorer: (Turkey) Neslihan Darnel
- Best spiker: (Serbia) Jovana Brakočević
- Best blocker: (Turkey) Eda Erdem
- Best server: (Bulgaria) Strashimira Filipova
- Best setter: (Serbia) Maja Ognjenović
- Best libero: (Bulgaria) Mariya Filipova
- Best receiver: (Serbia) Jelena Nikolić
