= 2012 Women's European Volleyball League =

European volleyball tournament

Tournament details
- Host country: Czech Republic
- Dates: June 1 – June 30 (qualification); July 5–6 (final round)
- Teams: 12
- Venue: 1 (in 1 host city)

Final positions
- Champions: Czech Republic (1st title)

Tournament awards
- MVP: (Czech Republic) Aneta Havlíčková

The 2012 Women's European Volleyball League was the fourth edition of the annual Women's European Volleyball League, which featured women's national volleyball teams from twelve European countries. A preliminary league round was played from June 1 to June 30, and the final four tournament, which was held at the Czech Republic on July 5–6, 2012.

During the league round, competing nations were drawn into three pools of four teams, and every team hosted a tournament with three other teams and playing a round-robin system over three days. One standings table was used, combined with all four tournaments. The Pool winners and the best runner up qualified for the final four round, joining the host team. If the final four host team finished first in its league round pool, the best pool runners-up qualified for the final four.

The Czech Republic defeated Bulgaria 3–0 in the final.

== Teams ==
- Bulgaria
- Czech Republic
- France
- Greece
- Hungary
- Israel
- Netherlands
- Romania
- Serbia
- Spain
- Switzerland
- Turkey

== League round ==
=== Pool A ===
Pos	Team	Pld	W	L	Pts	SW	SL	SR	SPW	SPL	SPR	Qualification
1	Serbia	12	12	0	35	36	6	6.000	1034	791	1.307	Semifinals
2	Romania	12	6	6	19	21	21	1.000	941	937	1.004	
3	Spain	12	6	6	18	23	22	1.045	987	1029	0.959	
4	Hungary	12	0	12	0	5	36	0.139	803	1008	0.797	

==== Leg 1 ====
The tournament was played at Hala sportova, Subotica, Serbia.

Date	Time		Score		Set 1	Set 2	Set 3	Set 4	Set 5	Total	Report
1 Jun	17:30	Spain	3–0	Romania	25–20	25–22	25–22			75–64	Report
1 Jun	20:15	Serbia	3–0	Hungary	25–15	25–12	25–22			75–49	Report
2 Jun	17:30	Romania	3–0	Hungary	25–23	25–20	25–21			75–64	Report
2 Jun	20:15	Spain	0–3	Serbia	17–25	11–25	19–25			47–75	Report
3 Jun	17:30	Hungary	1–3	Spain	18–25	25–20	21–25	16–25		80–95	Report
3 Jun	20:15	Serbia	3–1	Romania	27–25	25–16	22–25	25–15		99–81	Report

==== Leg 2 ====
The tournament was played at Sportmax 2, Budapest, Hungary.

Date	Time		Score		Set 1	Set 2	Set 3	Set 4	Set 5	Total	Report
8 Jun	16:00	Romania	0–3	Serbia	18–25	22–25	20–25			60–75	Report
8 Jun	19:00	Hungary	0–3	Spain	23–25	20–25	23–25			66–75	Report
9 Jun	16:00	Serbia	3–1	Spain	25–14	25–15	22–25	25–20		97–74	Report
9 Jun	19:00	Romania	3–1	Hungary	17–25	25–17	25–19	25–20		92–81	Report
10 Jun	16:00	Spain	1–3	Romania	25–23	19–25	14–25	21–25		79–98	Report
10 Jun	19:00	Hungary	1–3	Serbia	18–25	14–25	25–16	19–25		76–91	Report

==== Leg 3 ====
The tournament was played in Palau d'Esports de Granollers, Granollers, Spain.

Date	Time		Score		Set 1	Set 2	Set 3	Set 4	Set 5	Total	Report
15 Jun	17:00	Romania	0–3	Serbia	19–25	13–25	23–25			55–75	Report
15 Jun	20:00	Spain	3–0	Hungary	25–18	25–19	28–26			78–63	Report
16 Jun	15:00	Hungary	0–3	Serbia	12–25	14–25	17–25			43–75	Report
16 Jun	18:00	Spain	3–2	Romania	22–25	24–26	26–24	25–18	15–11	112–104	Report
17 Jun	15:00	Romania	3–0	Hungary	25–23	25–23	25–10			75–56	Report
17 Jun	18:00	Serbia	3–1	Spain	25–18	25–10	21–25	25–20		96–73	Report

==== Leg 4 ====
The tournament was played in Sala Polivalentă, Piatra Neamț, Romania.

Date	Time		Score		Set 1	Set 2	Set 3	Set 4	Set 5	Total	Report
22 Jun	17:00	Spain	2–3	Serbia	25–23	18–25	29–31	33–31	13–15	118–125	Report
22 Jun	19:30	Romania	3–1	Hungary	26–24	25–19	24–26	25–17		100–86	Report
23 Jun	17:00	Serbia	3–0	Hungary	25–22	25–17	25–14			75–53	Report
23 Jun	19:30	Spain	0–3	Romania	21–25	19–25	19–25			59–75	Report
24 Jun	17:00	Hungary	1–3	Spain	27–29	25–21	9–25	25–27		86–102	Report
24 Jun	19:30	Romania	0–3	Serbia	24–26	18–25	20–25			62–76	Report

=== Pool B ===
Pos	Team	Pld	W	L	Pts	SW	SL	SR	SPW	SPL	SPR	Qualification
1	Bulgaria	12	12	0	35	36	4	9.000	986	743	1.327	Semifinals
2	France	12	7	5	22	26	18	1.444	997	939	1.062	
3	Turkey	12	5	7	14	17	24	0.708	875	885	0.989	
4	Switzerland	12	0	12	1	3	36	0.083	669	960	0.697	

==== Leg 1 ====
The tournament was played at Palace of Culture and Sports, Varna, Bulgaria.

Date	Time		Score		Set 1	Set 2	Set 3	Set 4	Set 5	Total	Report
8 Jun	15:00	France	3–1	Turkey	16–25	25–22	25–21	25–18		91–86	Report
8 Jun	17:30	Bulgaria	3–0	Switzerland	25–17	25–18	25–11			75–46	Report
9 Jun	15:00	Turkey	3–0	Switzerland	25–12	25–13	25–20			75–45	Report
9 Jun	17:30	Bulgaria	3–1	France	23–25	25–20	25–15	25–15		98–75	Report
10 Jun	15:00	Switzerland	1–3	France	15–25	25–23	15–25	14–25		69–98	Report
10 Jun	17:30	Turkey	0–3	Bulgaria	21–25	20–25	19–25			60–75	Report

==== Leg 2 ====
The tournament was played at Atatürk Sport Hall, İzmir, Turkey.

Date	Time		Score		Set 1	Set 2	Set 3	Set 4	Set 5	Total	Report
15 Jun	16:00	Turkey	3–0	Switzerland	25–18	25–13	25–15			75–46	Report
15 Jun	18:30	France	1–3	Bulgaria	19–25	25–22	17–25	22–25		83–97	Report
16 Jun	16:30	Switzerland	0–3	Bulgaria	7–25	25–27	12–25			44–77	Report
16 Jun	19:00	Turkey	3–1	France	25–16	21–25	25–22	25–23		96–86	Report
17 Jun	16:30	Switzerland	0–3	France	15–25	18–25	17–25			50–75	Report
17 Jun	19:00	Bulgaria	3–0	Turkey	25–13	25–23	25–22			75–58	Report

==== Leg 3 ====
The tournament was played at Salle Omnisport St. Léonard, Fribourg, Switzerland.

Date	Time		Score		Set 1	Set 2	Set 3	Set 4	Set 5	Total	Report
22 Jun	17:30	Bulgaria	3–0	Turkey	25–15	25–19	25–20			75–54	Report
22 Jun	20:00	Switzerland	0–3	France	15–25	22–25	22–25			59–75	Report
23 Jun	17:30	Switzerland	2–3	Turkey	19–25	16–25	25–14	25–23	18–20	103–107	Report
23 Jun	20:00	France	2–3	Bulgaria	24–26	25–22	23–25	25–23	14–16	111–112	Report
24 Jun	15:00	Turkey	0–3	France	15–25	18–25	15–25			48–75	Report
24 Jun	17:30	Bulgaria	3–0	Switzerland	25–11	26–24	26–24			77–59	Report

==== Leg 4 ====
The tournament was played at Complexe St. Symphorien, Metz, France.

Date	Time		Score		Set 1	Set 2	Set 3	Set 4	Set 5	Total	Report
28 Jun	15:00	France	3–0	Switzerland	26–24	25–22	25–20			76–66	Report
28 Jun	18:00	Turkey	0–3	Bulgaria	18–25	22–25	18–25			58–75	Report
29 Jun	17:00	Switzerland	0–3	Bulgaria	13–25	14–25	12–25			39–75	Report
29 Jun	20:00	France	3–1	Turkey	25–20	21–25	25–23	25–15		96–83	Report
30 Jun	17:00	Switzerland	0–3	Turkey	14–25	8–25	21–25			43–75	Report
30 Jun	20:00	Bulgaria	3–0	France	25–16	25–17	25–23			75–56	Report

=== Pool C ===
Pos	Team	Pld	W	L	Pts	SW	SL	SR	SPW	SPL	SPR	Qualification
1	Netherlands	12	9	3	30	33	11	3.000	1002	833	1.203	Semifinals
2	Czech Republic	12	10	2	26	30	16	1.875	1034	911	1.135	Semifinals
3	Israel	12	3	9	9	12	28	0.429	790	955	0.827	
4	Greece	12	2	10	7	11	31	0.355	845	972	0.869	

==== Leg 1 ====
The tournament was played at Městská hala Vodová, Brno, Czech Republic.

Date	Time		Score		Set 1	Set 2	Set 3	Set 4	Set 5	Total	Report
1 Jun	15:00	Czech Republic	3–1	Israel	23–25	25–17	25–23	25–7		98–72	Report
1 Jun	18:00	Greece	0–3	Netherlands	15–25	15–25	14–25			44–75	Report
2 Jun	15:00	Netherlands	3–0	Israel	25–13	25–19	25–19			75–51	Report
2 Jun	18:00	Greece	0–3	Czech Republic	20–25	18–25	11–25			49–75	Report
3 Jun	15:00	Israel	1–3	Greece	22–25	19–25	25–23	21–25		87–98	Report
3 Jun	18:00	Czech Republic	3–2	Netherlands	25–17	25–23	22–25	21–25	15–10	108–100	Report

==== Leg 2 ====
The tournament was played at Topsport Centre, Almere, Netherlands.

Date	Time		Score		Set 1	Set 2	Set 3	Set 4	Set 5	Total	Report
8 Jun	17:00	Czech Republic	3–0	Israel	25–22	25–21	25–9			75–52	Report
8 Jun	19:30	Netherlands	3–0	Greece	25–18	25–21	25–16			75–55	Report
9 Jun	14:30	Israel	1–3	Netherlands	25–17	7–25	18–25	12–25		62–92	Report
9 Jun	17:00	Greece	2–3	Czech Republic	25–15	22–25	24–26	25–22	11–15	107–103	Report
10 Jun	14:30	Netherlands	2–3	Czech Republic	20–25	25–20	20–25	25–18	12–15	102–103	Report
10 Jun	17:00	Israel	3–0	Greece	25–12	25–23	25–23			75–58	Report

==== Leg 3 ====
The tournament was played at Metrowest Sport Palace, Ra'anana, Israel.

Date	Time		Score		Set 1	Set 2	Set 3	Set 4	Set 5	Total	Report
15 Jun	17:00	Greece	3–0	Israel	25–19	25–18	25–23			75–60	Report
15 Jun	19:30	Czech Republic	0–3	Netherlands	20–25	18–25	16–25			54–75	Report
16 Jun	17:00	Israel	3–0	Czech Republic	28–26	25–21	27–25			80–72	Report
16 Jun	19:30	Netherlands	3–0	Greece	25–16	25–16	27–25			77–57	Report
17 Jun	17:00	Czech Republic	3–1	Greece	25–17	16–25	25–18	25–18		91–78	Report
17 Jun	19:30	Netherlands	3–0	Israel	25–18	25–16	25–22			75–56	Report

==== Leg 4 ====
The tournament was played at Neo Kleisto Orestiados, Orestiada, Greece.

Date	Time		Score		Set 1	Set 2	Set 3	Set 4	Set 5	Total	Report
21 Jun	18:00	Israel	0–3	Czech Republic	14–25	12–25	21–25			47–75	Report
21 Jun	20:30	Netherlands	3–1	Greece	11–25	25–20	25–17	25–21		86–83	Report
22 Jun	18:00	Czech Republic	3–2	Netherlands	25–16	23–25	25–19	17–25	15–13	105–98	Report
22 Jun	20:30	Greece	1–3	Israel	22–25	25–18	23–25	17–25		87–93	Report
23 Jun	18:00	Netherlands	3–0	Israel	25–18	25–18	25–19			75–55	Report
23 Jun	20:30	Czech Republic	3–0	Greece	25–17	25–17	25–20			75–54	Report

== Final four ==
The final four was held at KV Arena in Karlovy Vary, Czech Republic on July 5/6, 2012.

Qualified teams

- Bulgaria
- Czech Republic (host)
- Netherlands
- Serbia

Semifinals
July 5 – Karlovy Vary
Bulgaria	3
Serbia	1
July 5 – Karlovy Vary
Czech Republic	3
Netherlands	1

Final
July 6 – Karlovy Vary
Bulgaria	0
Czech Republic	3
Third place
July 6 – Karlovy Vary
Serbia	3
Netherlands	1

=== Semifinals ===
Date	Time		Score		Set 1	Set 2	Set 3	Set 4	Set 5	Total	Report
5 July	15:00	Bulgaria	3–1	Serbia	34–32	25–22	21–25	25–20		105–99	Report
5 July	18:00	Czech Republic	3–1	Netherlands	25–17	20–25	25–23	25–17		95–82	Report

=== Third place match ===
Date	Time		Score		Set 1	Set 2	Set 3	Set 4	Set 5	Total	Report
6 July	15:00	Serbia	3–1	Netherlands	25–23	25–15	23–25	25–13		98–76	Report

=== Final ===
Date	Time		Score		Set 1	Set 2	Set 3	Set 4	Set 5	Total	Report
6 July	18:00	Bulgaria	0–3	Czech Republic	24–26	18–25	23–25			65–76	Report

== Final standing ==
Rank	Team
1st place, gold medalist(s)	Czech Republic
2nd place, silver medalist(s)	Bulgaria
3rd place, bronze medalist(s)	Serbia
4	Netherlands
5	France
6	Romania
7	Spain
8	Turkey
9	Israel
10	Greece
11	Switzerland
12	Hungary

2012 Women's European League winners

Czech Republic
First title

== Awards ==
- MVP: (Czech Republic) Aneta Havlíčková
- Best scorer: (Bulgaria) Elitsa Vasileva
- Best spiker: (Bulgaria) Elitsa Vasileva
- Best server: (Bulgaria) Dobriana Rabadzhieva
- Best blocker: (Netherlands) Caroline Wensink
- Best receiver: (Czech Republic) Helena Havelková
- Best setter: (Serbia) Maja Ognjenović
- Best libero: (Czech Republic) Julie Jasova
