= Sport in Serbia =

Sport in Serbia includes football, basketball, handball, tennis, volleyball, and water polo. Professional sports in Serbia are organized by sporting federations and leagues (in case of team sports). Serbian professional sports includes multi-sport clubs (called "sports societies"), biggest and most successful of which are Crvena Zvezda (three world titles and seven European in various sports), Partizan (fourteen European titles in various sports), Radnički (three European titles in various sports) and Beograd in Belgrade, Vojvodina in Novi Sad, Radnički in Kragujevac, Spartak in Subotica. Serbia had successes in basketball, winning the Olympic silver medal and Nikola Jokic winning 3 NBA MVPs, as well as the 2023 NBA Championship and Finals MVP, Novak Djokovic winning a record setting 24th Grand Slam, and in handball, volleyball and water polo as well.

== Individual sports ==
=== Athletics ===
After folk games, athletics in the modern sense appeared at the beginning of the 20th century. Among the first events on the territory of Serbia was the race held in 1906 on the route Valjevo-Jovanje, and in 1908 the Gymnastics Association "Dusan Silni" founded the first athletic section. The founding of the Serbian Olympic Club in 1910 and the beginning of Serbia's participation in the Olympic Games were important for the further development of athletics.

The European Open Championship was organized in Belgrade in 1962, the European Indoor Games in 1966, and the European Club Championship for men in 1989. When it comes to the 21st century, the largest organized competition on the territory of Serbia is the European Indoor Championship in 2017. From the athletic competitions, the Belgrade Marathon and the memorial rally in honor of Artur Takač are held every year.

The successes of athletes from Serbia includes:

- Vera Nikolić - two-time European champion in the 800 meter race (1966, 1971), and world record holder with a time of 2: 00.5 (1968—1971)
- Nenad Stekić - two-time vice-champion of the Old Continent (1974, 1978), former European record holder in long jump (8.45), three years the best result in the world (1975, 1977 and 1978)
- Miloš Srejović - European triple jump champion in 1978.
- Vladimir Milić - European champion in throwing the ball in the hall in 1982.
- Dragan Zdravković - European champion in the 3000 meter indoor race in 1983.
- Snežana Pajkić - European champion in the 1500 meter race in 1990.
- Dragutin Topić - European champion in high jump 1990, European indoor champion 1996, bronze medal at the World Indoor Championships in 1997 and the European Indoor Championships in 1992 and 2000, (personal record 2.37 meters, among the 10 best of all time)
- Slobodan Branković - European indoor champion in the 400 meter race in 1992.
- Dragan Perić - bronze medal at the World Indoor Championships in 1995 and silver at the European Indoor Championships in 1994 in shot put
- Olivera Jevtić - the first athletic medal for Serbia since independence, a silver medal in the marathon at the 2006 European Championships, four bronze medals at the European Cross Country Championships.
- Asmir Kolašinac - gold medal in throwing the ball at the European Indoor Championships in 2013, silver in 2015 and bronze from the European Championships in 2012.
- Ivana Španović - in the long jump discipline, among the most significant successes are bronze from the 2016 Olympic Games, gold medals in 2023 World Athletics Championships, 2018 World Indoor Championships and 2022 World Indoor Championships, two world bronze medals in the open (2013, 2015), four European Championships titles - two in the open (2016 and 2022) and three in the hall (2015, 2017, 2019).
- Adriana Vilagoš - Winner of three medals in European Athletics Championships in javelin throw, silver in 2022 and 2024 and bronze in 2026.
- Angelina Topić - Winner of two medals in European Athletics Championships in high jump, silver in 2024 and bronze in 2022.

=== Bowling ===
The national team of Serbia were two-time world champions in bowling in 9 cones and broke the team world record. Vilmos Zavarko is the world record holder in individual competition, and he won four gold, three silver and two bronze medals at the world championships, as well as the first place on the world ranking list.

=== Chess ===
There are 46 grandmasters (active and inactive) among Serbian chess players. At the Chess Olympics in 1950, the Yugoslavia national team won a gold medal, and among the Serbian chess players in the national team were Petar Trifunović and Svetozar Gligorić, who won medals at other Olympics, as well as at European championships. Among the most successful Serbian grandmasters are Borislav Ivkov, Aleksandar Matanović, Milan Matulović, Ivan Ivanišević, Dragan Šolak, Aleksandar Kovačević, Branko Damljanović, Igor Miladinović ...

There are 11 grandmasters among the female competitors. The most successful Serbian chess player is the former Minister of Sports and Youth, Alisa Marić, who won two bronze medals at the Chess Olympics, as well as a silver medal at the European Championship in 1999. Novi Sad hosted the Olympics in 1990, as well as the European Team Championship in 2009. In 1970, a match was held in Belgrade for the first time between the Soviet Union and the rest of the world.

=== Cycling ===
Djordje Nesic participated in international bicycle races in Europe as a student. On his initiative, the First Serbian Bicycle Association was founded in 1884, and he was elected president. The first competition race was held in Belgrade in 1896, and the following year the first national championship was held.

=== Diving ===
The Diving Association of Serbia is an organization that takes care of the development of diving on the territory of Serbia. It was founded in 1971 when it separated from the swimming association. There were a maximum of 13 clubs in the association. There are six members in the alliance, all from Belgrade. The greatest success of a Serbian competitor at the international level is the silver medal of Selena Trajković, under the flag of Yugoslavia, from the Mediterranean Games in 1979 in Split in the platform discipline. Belgrade hosted the first World Diving Championship in 1973.

=== Fencing ===
After the First World War, the Yugoslav Fencing Federation was founded with its headquarters in Belgrade, and later in Zagreb. The first individual state championship was held in 1928, and the club championship in 1939. During the Second World War, the Federation ceased to operate. In 1949, the work of the Alliance was renewed and it was renamed the Fencing Alliance of Yugoslavia. The main organization in charge of fencing in Serbia is the Fencing Association of Serbia. The most successful Serbian swordswoman is Tamara Savić-Šotra, a triple participant in the Olympic Games under the flag of FR Yugoslavia. The greatest success of the Serbian leadership since the independence of Serbia in 2006 is the bronze medal at the Mediterranean Games in Mersin in 2013, which was won by Smiljka Rodić.

=== Gymnastics ===
Gymnastics appeared among Serbs in the middle of the nineteenth century. The director of the Serbian Great Orthodox Gymnasium in Novi Sad, Djordje Natosevic, introduced classes and descriptive assessment. Stevan Todorović founded the First Serbian Society for Gymnastics and Wrestling in 1857.

Tereza Kočiš is a Serbian gymnast, who won a silver medal on the ground floor at the 1950 World Championships, and won silver medals on the beam and two-height loom at the European Championships in 1963, as well as a bronze medal on the ground floor. At the same championship, Mirjana Bilić became the European champion in all-around and on the floor, and she also won bronze on the beam. As for rhythmic gymnastics, Milena Reljin took 5th place at the 1984 Olympic Games in Los Angeles, and Danijela Simić 10. Belgrade hosted the European Men's Championship in 1963.

=== Kayak and canoe ===
The Kayak Federation of Yugoslavia was formed in 1930, and the Federation of Serbia in 1953.Four world and one European championships were held in Belgrade. The best results in kayaking and canoeing were achieved at the 1984 Olympic Games in Los Angeles, when Mirko Nišović won a gold medal in the double canoe at 500 (S-2) and a silver at 1000, and Milan Janić won silver in the single kayak. 2) at 1000 m. They were both three-time world champions and won more medals.

Milan Janić children are also kayakers. Mico and Stjepan won a silver medal in the 1000 m at the 1998 World Championships. Later, they changed their citizenship, Mićo and Stjepan joined the Croatian national team, and Nataša competes under the Hungarian flag, for which she won medals.

Ognjen Filipović, Dragan Zorić, Bora Sibinkić and Milan Đenandić were trophy four-seater in a kayak. In the 200 m race, among other things, they won gold at the world and European championships. Filipović won medals in the one-seater, but also in the two-seater with Zorić.

Dusko Stanojevic and Dejan Pajic won bronze at the 2010 World Championships and silver at the European Championships in 2011 in a two-seater kayak in the 500 meters. silver medals. In 2014, Novaković won a gold medal with Nebojsa Grujić at the world championships in the two-seater 200 m, with the fastest time of all time in that discipline. Then they won a silver medal at the European Championships and a gold medal at the European Games.

Antonija Nagy twice won a silver medal at the European championships in the 1000 meter race. The sisters, Nikolina and Olivera Moldovan, won three medals at the world championships, three at the European and one at the European Games.

Dalma Benedek, after being an eight-time world and seven-time European champion, has been competing under the Serbian flag since 2013 and in the same year won gold medals at the European Championships in the 500 and 1,000 meters, and then bronze in the 500 meters at the World Championships., as well as up to two or two bronze medals at the European Championship and gold at the European Games with Milica Starović.

=== Motorsports ===
Milos Pavlovic is a Serbian motorist. He was the champion in Nissan's world light series, and in 2007 he won third place in the Formula Renault series with two victories. He competed in Formula 2 in 2009 and took 9th place, he was on the podium twice. Dušan Borković won the title of champion in the European Mountain Racing Championship in 2012, winning eight of the eleven races.A year earlier, he took third place. As a representative of the NIS Petrol Racing Team in the European Touring Cup car in 2013 took third place in the overall standings, and since 2014 competes in the FIA World Touring Car Championship. The Belgrade Grand Prix was the last Grand Prix motorcycle race, the forerunner of Formula 1, before the start of World War II.

=== Rowing ===
The Rowing Federation of Serbia, then Yugoslavia, was founded in 1922. The European Championships were held in Belgrade in 1932 and 2014. Zoran Pančić and Milorad Stanulov are Serbian rowers, who won a silver medal (M2x) for Yugoslavia in the 1980 Olympic Games in Moscow and a bronze medal in Los Angeles in 1984. The most successful rowers in independent Serbia are Nikola Stojić and Goran Jagar, who were European champions as a duo without a coxswain (M2 -).Nikola Stojić won a gold medal with Jovan Popović at the 2006 World Championships in the doubles with a coxswain (M2 +), while with Jagar, Popović and Marko Marjanović he won silver in the quadruple with a coxswain (M4 +) in 2007. Stojić also won with Nenad Bedjik. in the discipline, the duo without a coxswain won a bronze (2012) and a gold medal (2013) at the European Championships. Besides them, Goran Nedeljković, Miloš Tomić, Nenad Babović, Dušan Bogićević and Veselin Savić won medals at competitions. Iva Obradović won two silver medals at the European Championships.

=== Shooting ===
Shooting is one of the oldest sports in Serbia. The first shooting club was founded in Bela Crkva in 1777, and the Association of Shooting Societies of the Kingdom of Serbia was formed in 1887. The European Championship was held twice in Belgrade, in 2005 and 2011. Jasna Šekarić won a gold medal (10m air pistol discipline) at the 1988 Olympics. At the same Games, she won a bronze medal in the sport pistol discipline. She continued her success in Barcelona in 1992, Sydney in 2000, and Athens in 2004, winning three silver medals in the air pistol disciplines. In addition, she was a three-time world champion and a four-time European champion, and also broke the world record. Goran Maksimović won a gold medal in the air rifle disciplines at the 1988 Olympic Games, and Ivana Maksimović won silver in the small-caliber rifle three positions at the 2012 Olympic Games. Damir Mikec and Zorana Arunović won the gold medal in 2024 Olympic Games in the mixed 10 metre air pistol team

In addition to them, the shooters who won Olympic medals from Serbia are:

- Aleksandra Ivošev (1996 gold in the triple rifle discipline and bronze in the air rifle discipline, bronze with the European Championship)
- Aranka Binder (1992 Bronze in Air Rifle)
- Stevan Pletikosic (1992 bronze in Olympic discipline, world record, two silver medals with world championship)
- Andrija Zlatić (2012 bronze in the 10 m air pistol disciplines, European champion, two silver medals at the World and European Championships)
- Damir Mikec (2020 silver in the 10 m air pistol disciplines, multiple World and European champion)
- Milenko Sebić (2020 bronze in the 50 m rifle three positions disciplines)

World records in the triple jump were broken by Vladimir Grozdanović and Mirjana Mašić (European Championship and double championship in air rifles), and in air rifles Srećko Pejović (silver with European Championship) and Ten Sasen-on foot, gold with European Championship. Zorana Arunović became the world champion in 2010 in the air pistol disciplines and won a gold medal at the European Games in 2015, while among the successful shooters are Dušan Efafanić (bronze with the world championship), Nemanja Mirosavljev (bronze with WC, silver and bronze from the European Championship, Damir Mikec (silver at the European Championship, two gold medals at the European Games), Bobana Veličković (two-time European champion), Andreja Arsović (gold at the European Championship and European Games).

=== Swimming ===
Milorad Čavić won a silver medal in swimming (discipline 100 meters butterfly) at the 2008 Olympic Games, and a gold and a silver medal at the 2009 World Championships. He won ten medals at the European Championships. He broke world and European records several times.

Nađa Higl became the world champion in the 200-meter breaststroke in 2009, breaking the European record.

Velimir Stjepanović won gold medals in the 200 m and 400 m freestyle at the European Championships in 50-meter pool, as well as a bronze medal at the World Championships in 25-meter pools in the 400 m freestyle.

Andrej Barna won the silver medal in the 50-metre freestyle in 2026 European Championships, as well as a bronze medal in 100 m freestyle in 2024 European Championships.

Serbian 4x100m freestyle relay team won the gold medal in 2024 European Championships.

Ivan Lenđer, Čaba Silađi, Miroslava Najdanovski and Szebasztián Szabó won medals at the Universiade, the Mediterranean Games, the European Championship in 25-meter pools, and junior championships. The first World Aquatics Championships in water sports was held in Belgrade in 1973.

=== Table tennis ===
In table tennis, Serbian athletes are most successful in the doubles game. Ilija Lupulescu won a silver Olympic medal in men's doubles in 1988, and Jasna Fazlić and Gordana Perkučin won a bronze medal in women's doubles. Zoran Kalinic won one world title and 3 European doubles titles. He has 3 more silver medals from the world championships. Aleksandar Karakašević was the European champion in mixed doubles three times, in 2000, 2005 and 2007, all three times in a pair with the Lithuanian Ruta Pakauskiene. He won five more medals at the European Championships, including a bronze medal in the individual competition in 2011. In 2003, Silvija Erdelji won a bronze medal in the individual competition at the European Championships, as well as in doubles with her sister Anamarija Erdelji. In 1981, Novi Sad hosted competitors at the 36th World Table Tennis Championships (SPENS). Belgrade hosted the European Championship in 2007.

=== Tennis ===
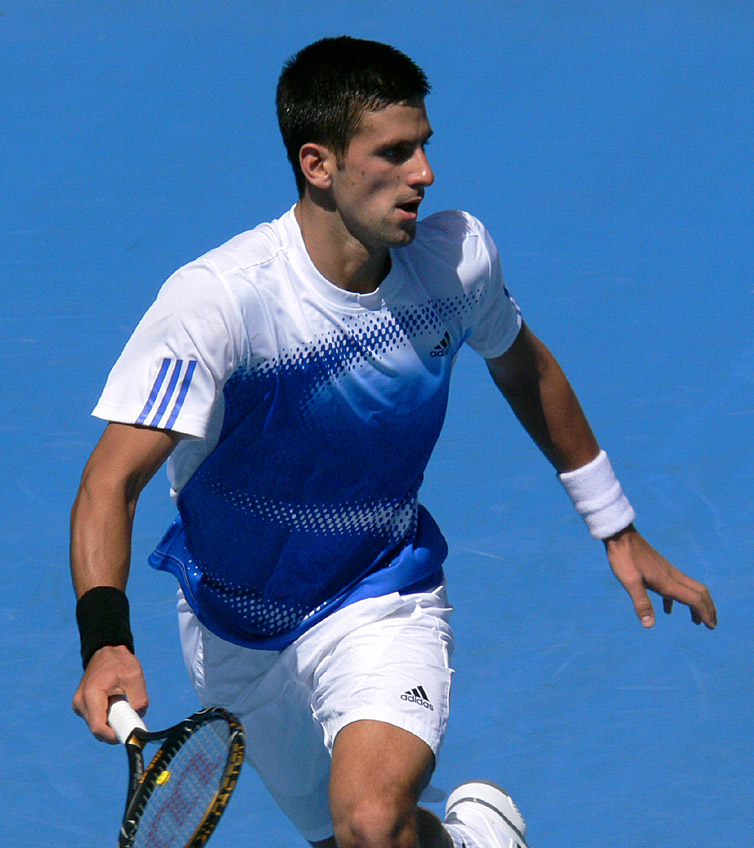
Novak Djokovic has won a record 24 Grand Slam titles

Recent success of Serbian tennis players has led to a growth in the popularity of tennis in Serbia. Novak Djokovic holds the all-time record with 24 Grand Slam titles, a record 40 Masters, a record seven year-end championships, 8 year end number 1 titles, and the only player in singles to have won all of the Big Titles over the course of his career. He spent a record 428 weeks as ATP world number 1.

Monica Seles, a former world no. 1, member of the International Tennis Hall of Fame, won eight Grand Slam singles titles (while representing FR Yugoslavia).

Ana Ivanovic (champion of 2008 French Open) and Jelena Janković were both ranked No. 1 in the WTA rankings. Janković was a Grand Slam champion in mixed doubles (2007 Wimbledon Championships). There were two No. 1 ranked-tennis double players as well: Nenad Zimonjić (three-time men's double and five-time mixed double Grand Slam champion) and Slobodan Živojinović (champion of 1986 US Open). The Serbia men's tennis national team won the 2010 Davis Cup, and 2020 ATP Cup, also two World Team Cup (in 2009 and 2012) while Serbia women's tennis national team reached the final at 2012 Fed Cup.

== Team sports ==
=== Basketball ===
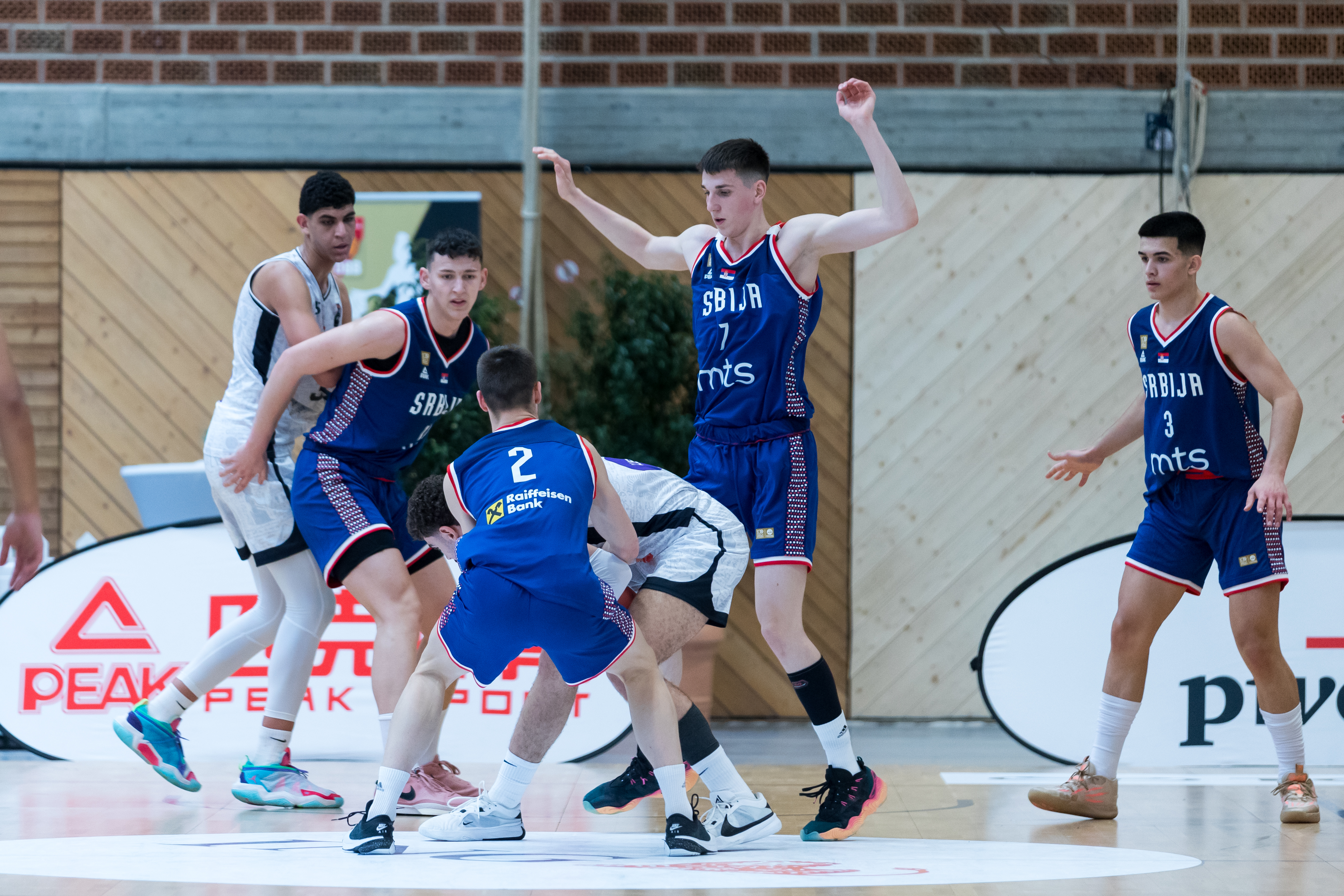
Serbia vs Egypt

Serbia men's national basketball team have won two World Cups in 1998 and 2002, so as silver medal in 2014 and 2023, three European Championships in 1995, 1997, and 2001, one FIBA Diamond Ball in 2004, two Olympic silver medals in 1996 and 2016, and bronze medal in 2024

The women's national basketball team won the European Championship twice (2015 and 2021) and Olympic bronze medal in 2016.

Serbia men's national 3x3 team have won six FIBA 3x3 World Cups (in 2012, 2016, 2017, 2018, 2022 and 2023), and five FIBA 3x3 Europe Cup (2018, 2019, 2021, 2022 and 2023).

A total of 34 Serbian players (five with an NBA ring) have played in the NBA in last three decades, including Nikola Jokić (2023 NBA champion, three-time NBA Most Valuable Player and a six-time NBA All-Star), Predrag "Peja" Stojaković (three-time NBA All-Star) and Vlade Divac (2001 NBA All-Star and Basketball Hall of Famer). European basketball coach Željko Obradović who won 9 Euroleague titles as a coach. The first foreign coach in the history of any NBA team is Igor Kokoškov. KK Partizan basketball club was the 1992 European champion and ŽKK Crvena zvezda women's basketball club was 1979 European champion.

Miloš Teodosić (2010) and Nemanja Bjelica (2015) received the award for the most useful player in the Euroleague, and Predrag Danilović, Žarko Paspalj, Zoran Savić, Željko Rebrača and twice Dejan Bodiroga were named the most useful players in the final tournament. Radivoj Korać, Dragan Kićanović, Vlade Divac, Zoran Slavnić and Dražen Dalipagić, who is also a member of the NBA Hall of Fame, were admitted to the FIBA Hall of Fame. Aleksandar Nikolić and Ranko Žeravica were received from the coaches, and Obrad Belošević from the basketball referees.

Due to the many successes, basketball is currently the second most popular sport in the country, trailing only slightly behind football. It is also the most popular sport played by women, sharing the position with volleyball.

==== Attendances ====
In the 2024–25 league season, the two European basketball clubs with the highest average home league attendance were both from Serbia:

#	Club	Average
1	Partizan Mozzart Bet	18,486
2	Crvena zvezda Meridianbet	18,239

=== Football ===
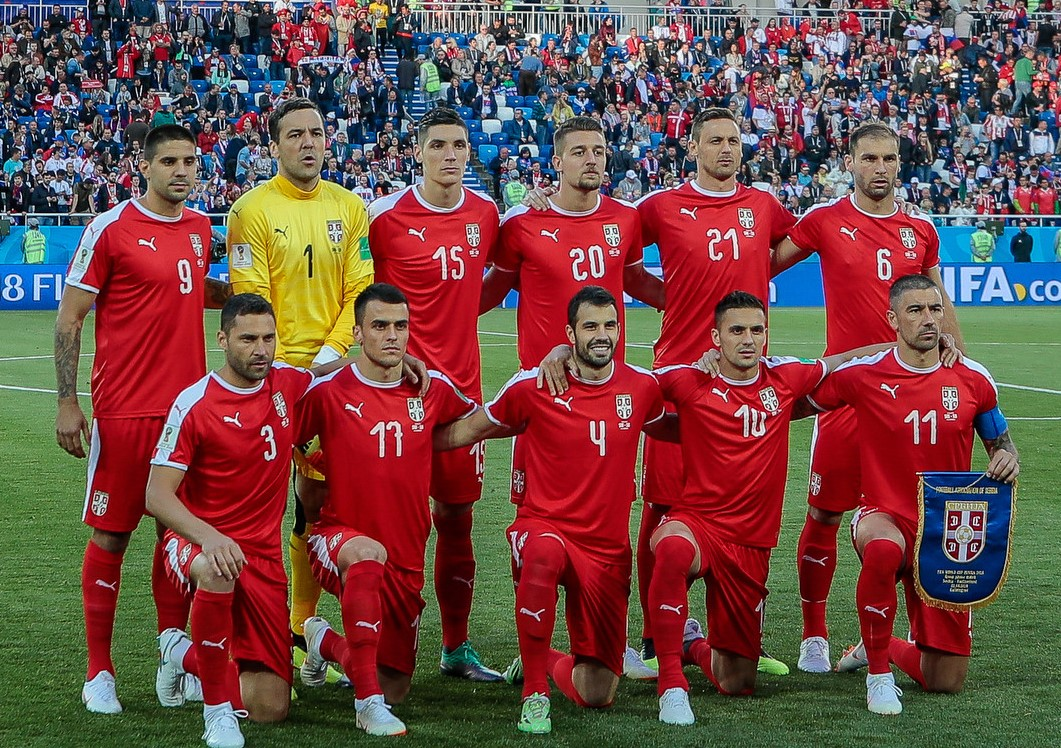
Serbia national football team

Football is the most popular sport in Serbia, and the Football Association of Serbia with 146,845 registered players, is the largest sporting association in the country. Dragan Džajić was officially recognized as "the best Serbian player of all times" by the Football Association of Serbia, and more recently players such as Nemanja Vidić, Dejan Stanković, Branislav Ivanović, Aleksandar Kolarov, Nemanja Matić and Dušan Tadić played in the UEFA Champions League and achieved a lot of success in their careers. The Serbia national football team lacks relative success although it qualified for four five FIFA World Cups. Serbia national youth football teams have won 2013 U-19 European Championship and 2015 U-20 World Cup. The two main football clubs in Serbia are Crvena Zvezda who won under Yugoslavia the 1991 European Cup and 1991 Intercontinental Cup) and Partizan being the (finalist of the 1966 European Cup), both from Belgrade. The rivalry between the two clubs is known as the "Eternal Derby", and is often cited as one of the most exciting sports rivalries in the world.

In addition, the Serbian football players who won the Champions League with their clubs are Velibor Vasović, Boriša Đorđević, Vladimir Jugović, Perica Ognjenović, Nemanja Vidić, Dejan Stanković, Branislav Ivanović and Luka Jović and in women's football Jovana Damnjanović. Bora Milutinović led a large number of world clubs and national teams, and participated in the World Cups with five different national teams. The House of Football, the sports center of the Football Association of Serbia, was opened in Stara Pazova in 2011.

=== Handball ===
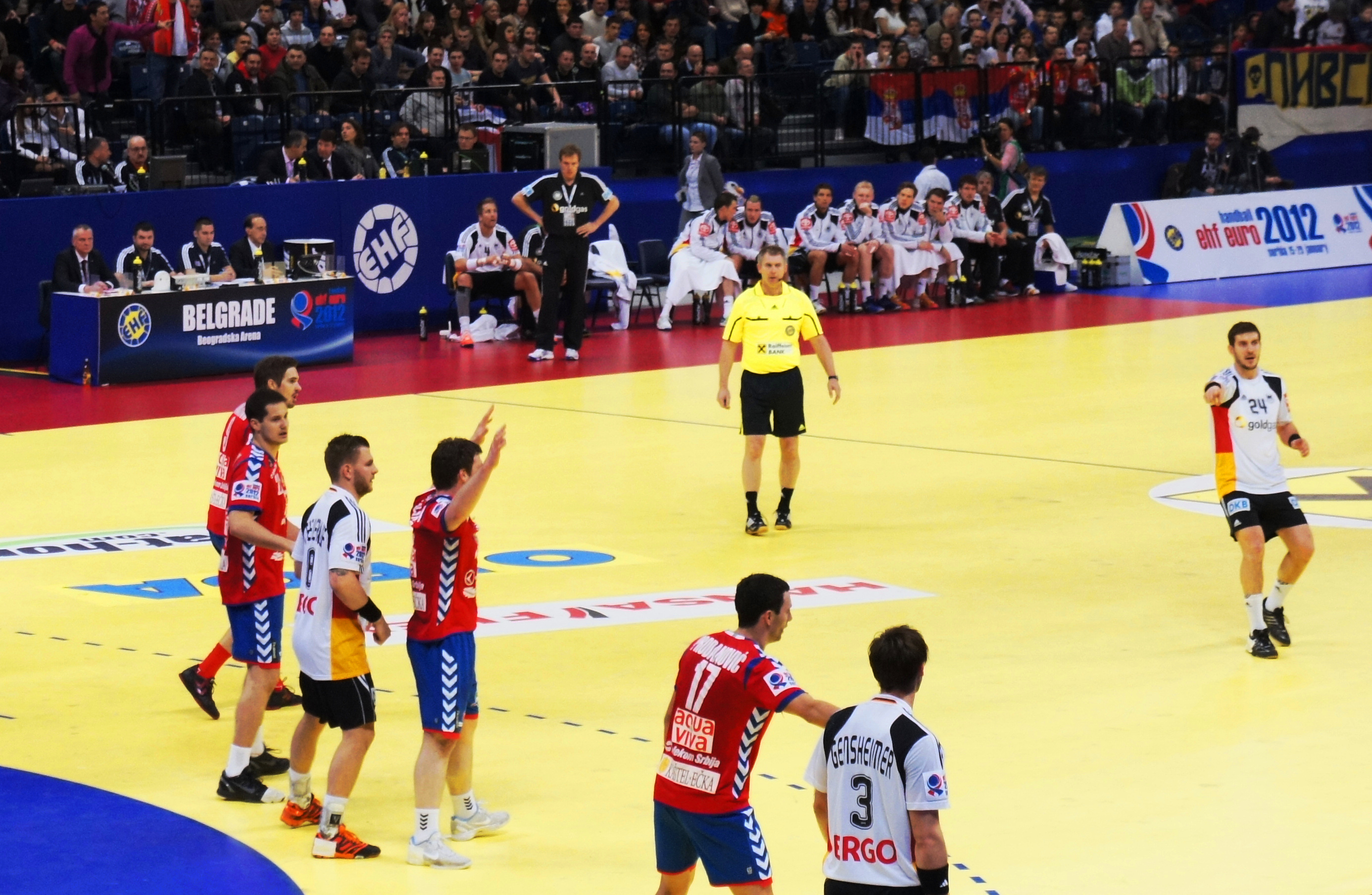
Serbia vs Germany 2012 European Men's Handball Championship

The Handball Federation of Serbia is a house that organizes domestic leagues and manages the women's and men's handball national teams of Serbia. The federation was founded in 1949. Serbia hosted the 2012 European Championship in men's competition where the Serbian national team won second place and a silver medal. In the same year, the women's championship was organized, and the next world championship for women, at which the Serbian national team won silver. RK Metaloplastika has twice been the champion of the Champions League. Dragan Skrbic were named IHF Player of the Year. One of the players from the so-called of the golden generation is Mile Isaković. In 1988, Svetlana Kitić was named IHF Player of the Year. Andrea Lekić is the winner of the award for the best handball player in the world in 2013.

=== Volleyball ===
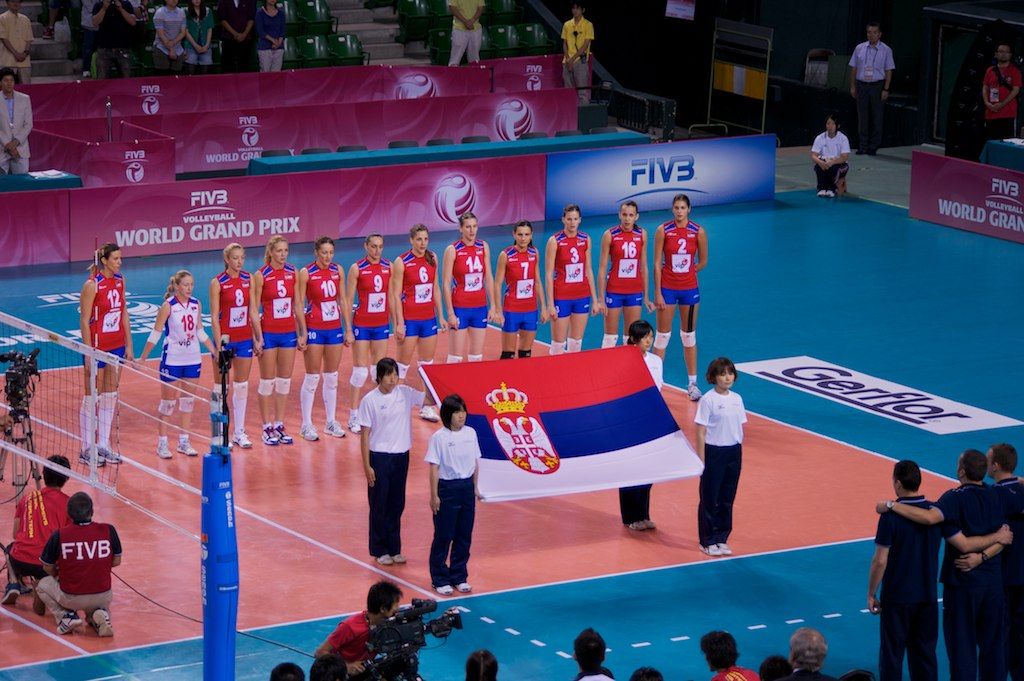
Serbia women's national volleyball team

In 1924, several American sports were demonstrated in Belgrade and Novi Sad, including volleyball. Serbia’s men's national team won the gold medal at 2000 Olympics, silver and bronze medal at the World Championship, the European Championship on 3 occasions (2001, 2011 and 2019) as well as the 2016 FIVB World League.

The women's national volleyball team have won World Championship two times (2018 and 2022), European Championship three times (2011, 2017 and 2019) as well as silver medal in the 2016 Olympics and bronze in 2020 Olympics.

Ivan Miljković was named the most useful player of the European Championship in 2001 and 2011, and Jovana Brakočević in 2011. Vladimir Grbić is a member of the Volleyball Hall of Fame, as well as the Volleyball Hall of Fame together with his brother Nikola Grbić. Tijana Bošković was named by the FIVB and CEV as the most useful volleyball player of the European Championship in 2017 and the World Championship in 2018, as well as CEV Female Volleyball Player of the Year three times (2017,2018,2019).

=== Beach volleyball ===
The Volleyball Federation of Serbia is in charge of the development of beach volleyball in Serbia. Beach volleyball was first played in Serbia in the early 1990s. A year later, the Volleyball Association of Belgrade launched an initiative to create a section within the association, which was also the beginning of organized work. The first championship was held in 1997, and a year later the tournament in San Diego was won. There are currently two competitions in Serbia: the Championship and the Cup, which are played according to the tournament system. Since 2008, the European Masters Tournament has been organized in Novi Sad, with the participation of players from different countries. The most successful competitors are Stefan Basta and Igor Tešić, the champions of the Balkans.

=== Water polo ===
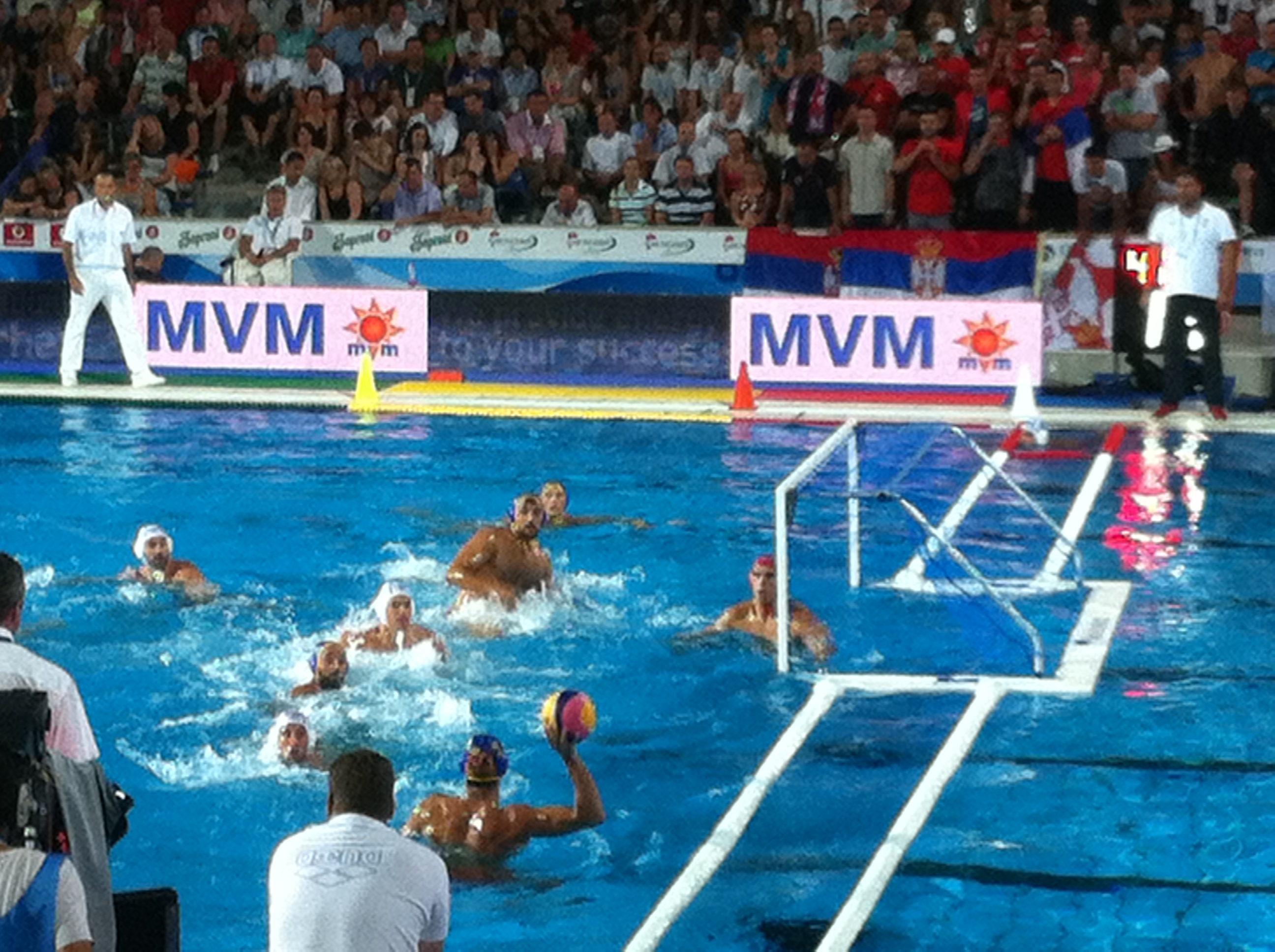
2014 European Water Polo Championship, Serbia vs Montenegro

In Serbia, water polo was originally played on the territory of Vojvodina, the first matches were played in Sombor at the beginning of the 20th century. Students who have studied in Hungary, Austria and Germany, where this sport has already been developed, are most responsible for the arrival of water polo.

The Serbia men's national water polo team is the second most successful national team after Hungary in the history of sport, having won three Olympic gold medals (in 2016, 2020, and 2024), three World Championships (2005, 2009 and 2015). The last 3 FINA World Cups in 2006, 2010, 2014. A record 12 FINA World Leagues and eight European Championships in 2001, 2003, 2006, 2012, 2014, 2016, 2018 and 2026 respectively. VK Partizan has won seven European champion titles, VK Bečej and VK Crvena zvezda one.

The most famous players of the golden generation of Serbian water polo were: Igor Milanović, Aleksandar Šoštar, Vladimir Vujasinović, Aleksandar Šapić, Aleksandar Ćirić and Vanja Udovičić.

Filip Filipovic received FINA Water polo player of the year award in 2009, 2011, 2014 and 2021. Vanja Udovicic received it in 2010, and Dušan Mandić in 2020.

Igor Milanović and Mirko Sandić are members of the House of Famous Water Sports.

== Winter sports ==
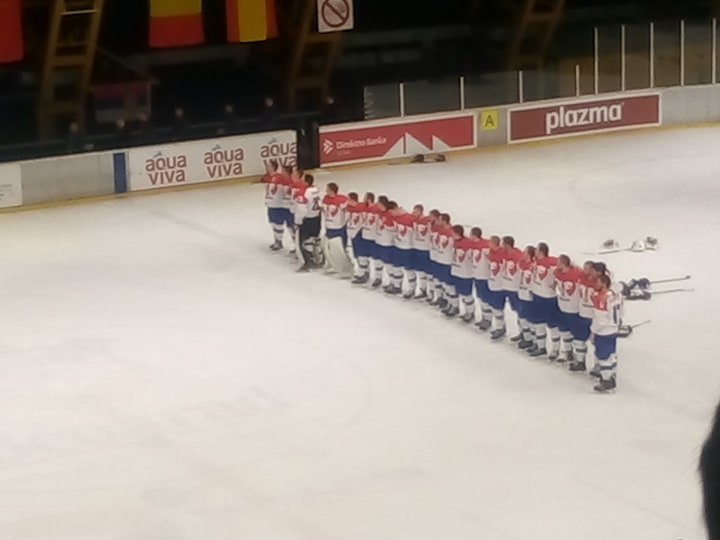
Serbia men's national ice hockey team

Serbian sports athletes are regular participants in the Winter Olympics, but as of 2022 Serbia has not yet won a single medal.

The first organized skiing was in 1922 in the winter-mountaineering section of the Serbian Mountaineering Association, and in the sports sense in 1929, when a cross-country skiing competition was organized on Avala. In 1935, the Mountaineering Association built a mountain lodge on Kopaonik, which was used by skiers from Belgrade, and the following year the first championship in alpine disciplines was held.

According to some data, skating has been practiced in Novi Sad since the end of the nineteenth century. It was originally skated on frozen natural water surfaces. The first artificial ice rink was built in 1890.The best Serbian skater is Trifun Živanović. He won medals at prestigious international competitions, was a participant in World and European Championships. He participated in the Olympic Games in Turin in 2006, which no Serbian competitor managed to repeat. Among skaters, Helena Pajović and Ksenija Jastsenjski achieved more significant results.

Jelena Lolović is the most successful alpine skier. She won medals at the Winter Universiade. Nevena Ignjatović, a gold medalist in slalom at the 2013 Universiade, is also a successful alpine skier. The largest ski centers in Serbia are located on Kopaonik, Zlatibor and Stara Planina.

Milanko Petrovic achieved the greatest success in cross-country skiing in Serbia. He won a gold medal at the 2013 Universiade in the 10 km freestyle.

At the European Biathlon Championships in 2012 in the sprint discipline, Milanko Petrović took 9th place, and at the 2013 World Cup race in Oberhof, Germany, he won the first points, which are also the first points of Serbia ever at the World Cup and the most valuable. the result of Serbian biathlon. At the Universiade in 2013, he won a gold medal in the 10 km sprint and a bronze medal in the individual 20 km.

The most successful and most trophy-winning Serbian snowboarder is Nina Micic. She won silver at the 2007 European Youth Olympic Festival in Haki, which is also the only international medal in winter sports under the Serbian flag, participates in the World Cup and regularly wins points.The first snowboarding park in Serbia was opened on Kopaonik in 2012.The Serbian bobsled team competed in the 2002 Salt Lake City Olympics, where it finished 25th. and Vancouver in 2010, where he was 18th.The best place at the European Championships was 10th place in 2013 in Austria. The most successful Serbian bobsledder is Vuk Radjenovic, who is currently among the top 50 in the world.

Among the most trophy-winning clubs in the national hockey championship are Partizan, Crvena zvezda and Vojvodina. Since the founding of the Serbian Hockey League, no more than 5 clubs have participated. Partizan won every championship, and counting the Yugoslav championships, he was the champion 16 times. Partizan also triumphed twice in the regional Slohokej league.

Five ski jumps were built on the territory of Serbia. They were located on Avala, Košutnjak, Fruška gora, Goč and Kopaonik. Currently, there is only a ski jump on Goč, but it is not in use either.

In 2005, Belgrade hosted the World Junior Speed Skating Championships.

== Athletes with disabilities ==
The Paralympic Committee of Serbia is a national Paralympic Committee that organizes and sends athletes to competitions adapted for competitors with disabilities, primarily the Paralympic Games. The chairman of the committee is Zoran Mićović. The most developed throwing disciplines are in athletics. Zeljko Dereta became the Paralympic champion in shot put in 1984, breaking the world record, and he also won a silver medal in shot put and a bronze medal in discus throw. Nada Vuksanović won gold (with a world record) and silver in shot put and gold in discus throw. Draženko Mitrović won two silver Paralympic medals in discus throw, as well as five silver medals from world championships and other throwing disciplines, he was a three-time European champion and broke the world record. Tanja Dragić also broke the world record, and in 2011 she became the champion at the world championships, and the next Paralympic ones in javelin throwing. Zeljko Dimitrijevic broke the world record in shot put in 2012 and won the Paralympic gold. Milos Grlica won a bronze medal in javelin throw in 2004, and he was also the European champion. Slobodan Adzic won Paralympic medals in racing disciplines, silver in the 1,500 and 5,000 meters, two bronze medals in the 400 and one in the 5,000 meters.

In 1988, the SFRY national team won a gold medal in goalball. Miroslav Jančić was a member of the team, but he also competed in athletics and won gold in pentathlon, as well as silver in javelin throw and bronze in fast walking.

The most successful competitors in table tennis are Svetislav Dimitrijevic, winner of two gold and one silver Paralympic medal, Zlatko Kesler, one gold, two silver and bronze, world and European champion, Borislava Peric, two silver medals from 2008 and 2012, as well as gold from European Championships, Zoran Gajić two bronze medals from the Paralympic Games.

In archery, Ružica Aleksov won two gold and one silver medal at the Paralympic Games, Simo Kecman was the Paralympic champion, and Radomir Rakonjac won a silver medal. Drago Ristic and Sinisa Vidic broke world records.

The greatest successes in swimming were achieved by Nenad Krišanović, who won gold and two silver medals, and Jovo Cvetanovski was the world champion.

Lazar Filipović won a silver medal at the 2012 World Paratriathlon Championships.

== National leagues ==
Football:

- Serbian Superliga
- Serbian First League
- Serbian League
- Serbian Zone League
- Serbian SuperLiga (women)
- Prva Futsal Liga
- Serbian cup
- Serbian Women's Cup

Basketball:

- Basketball League of Serbia
- Second Basketball League of Serbia
- First Regional Basketball League Serbia
- Second Regional Basketball League Serbia
- First Women's Basketball League of Serbia
- Cup Radivoj Korac
- Milan Ciga Vasojević Cup
- ABA League
- ABA League Second Division
- ABA League Supercup
- WABA League

Volleyball:

- Volleyball League of Serbia
- Serbian Women's Volleyball League

Handball:

- Handball League of Serbia
- Serbian Handball Cup
- Serbian First League of Handball for Women
- SEHA League

Water Polo:

- Serbian Water Polo League A
- Serbian Water Polo Cup

Ice hockey:

- Serbian Hockey League
- Panonian League
- Slohokej League

Rugby football:

- Rugby Championship of Serbia
- Serbian Rugby League Championship

== National sports teams ==
=== Football ===
- Serbia national football team
- Serbia national under-21 football team
- Serbia national under-20 football team
- Serbia national under-19 football team
- Serbia national under-17 football team
- Serbia national beach soccer team
- Serbia women's national football team
- Serbia women's national under-19 football team
- Serbia women's national under-17 football team
- Serbia national futsal team

=== Basketball ===
- Serbia men's national basketball team
- Serbia men's national under-20 basketball team
- Serbia men's national under-19 basketball team
- Serbia men's national under-18 basketball team
- Serbia men's national under-17 basketball team
- Serbia men's national under-16 basketball team
- Serbian men's university basketball team
- Serbia women's national basketball team
- Serbia women's national under-20 basketball team
- Serbia women's national under-18 and under-19 basketball team
- Serbia women's national under-16 and under-17 basketball team
- Serbian women's university basketball team
- Serbia men's national 3x3 team
- Serbia men's national under-18 3x3 team
- Serbia women's national 3x3 team

=== Volleyball ===
- Serbia men's national volleyball team
- Serbia men's national under-21 volleyball team
- Serbia men's national under-19 volleyball team
- Serbia women's national volleyball team
- Serbia women's national under-23 volleyball team
- Serbia women's national under-20 volleyball team
- Serbia women's national under-18 volleyball team

=== Handball ===
- Serbia men's national handball team
- Serbia women's national handball team
- Serbia men's national youth handball team
- Serbia national beach handball team
- Serbia women's national beach handball team

=== Water polo ===
- Serbia men's national water polo team
- Serbia women's national water polo team

=== Tennis ===
- Serbia Davis Cup team
- Serbia Fed Cup team
- Serbia Hopman Cup team

=== Rugby league ===
- Serbia national rugby league team

=== Rugby union ===
- Serbia national rugby union team
- Serbia national rugby sevens team
- Serbia women's national rugby union team
- Serbia women's national rugby sevens team

=== Ice hockey ===
- Serbia national ice hockey team
- Serbia men's national junior ice hockey team
- Serbia men's national under-18 ice hockey team

=== Softball ===
- Serbia women's national softball team

=== Baseball ===
- Serbia national baseball team

=== Cricket ===
- Serbia national cricket team

=== Korfball ===
- Serbia national korfball team

=== American football ===
- Serbia national American football team

== Achievements ==
=== Football ===
==== Club ====
UEFA Champions League
- 1990–91 winners: Crvena Zvezda
- 1965-66 runners-up Partizan

UEFA Europa League

- 1978–79 runners-up: Crvena Zvezda

UEFA Super Cup

- 1991 Runners-up Crvena Zvezda

Intercontinental Cup

- 1991 winners: Crvena Zvezda

Mitropa Cup

- 1958 winners Crvena Zvezda
- 1967–68 winners Crvena Zvezda
- 1976–77 winners Vojvodina
- 1977–78 winners Partizan

International (men)

- 2004 Runners-up UEFA European Under-21 Championship
- 2007 Runners-up UEFA European Under-21 Championship
- 2015 Champions FIFA U-20 World Cup
- 2013 Champions UEFA European Under-19 Championship

==== Tournament ====
- Serbia at the FIFA World Cup
- Serbia at the UEFA European Championship

Serbia national football team results:

- Serbia national football team results
- Serbia national football team results (2006–2009)
- Serbia national football team results (2010–2019)
- Serbia national football team results (2020–present)
- Serbia national under-21 football team results

Serbian football clubs in European competitions:

- Red Star Belgrade in European football
- FK Partizan in European football
- FK Vojvodina in European football
- FK Radnički Niš in European football
- OFK Beograd in European football

=== Basketball ===
==== International (men) ====
Games	Gold	Silver	Bronze	Total
Olympic Games	0	2	1	3
World Cup	2	2	0	4
European Championship	3	2	1	6
Total	5	6	2	13

Serbia men's national basketball team:

- 1996 Runners-up Basketball at the Summer Olympics
- 2016 Runners-up Basketball at the Summer Olympics
- 2024 Third place Basketball at the Summer Olympics
- 1998 Champions FIBA World Championship
- 2002 Champions FIBA World Championship
- 2014 Runners-up FIBA World Championship
- 2023 Runners-up FIBA World Championship
- 1995 Champions EuroBasket
- 1997 Champions EuroBasket
- 1999 Third place EuroBasket
- 2001 Champions EuroBasket
- 2009 Runners-up EuroBasket
- 2017 Runners-up EuroBasket
- 2023 Runners-up FIBA World Championship

Serbia men's national under-20 basketball team:

- 1998, 2006, 2007, 2008, 2015 Champions FIBA U20 European Championship
- 1996, 2005, 2014 Third place FIBA U20 European Championship

Serbia men's national under-19 basketball team

- 2007 Champions FIBA Under-19 Basketball World Cup
- 2011, 2013 Runners-up FIBA Under-19 Basketball World Cup

Serbia men's national under-18 basketball team

- 2005, 2007, 2009, 2017, 2018 Champions FIBA U18 European Championship
- 2011, 2014 Runners-up FIBA U18 European Championship
- 1996, 2012 Third place FIBA U18 European Championship

Serbia men's national under-17 basketball team

- 2014 Third place FIBA Under-17 Basketball World Cup

Serbia men's national under-16 basketball team

- 1997, 1999, 2001, 2003, 2007 Champions FIBA U16 European Championship
- 2013 Runners-up FIBA U16 European Championship
- 2006, 2009, 2012, 2017 Third place FIBA U16 European Championship

Serbian men's university basketball team

- 2001, 2003, 2009, 2011 Champions Basketball at the Summer Universiade
- 1999, 2007 Runners-up Basketball at the Summer Universiade
- 2005, 2013 Third place Basketball at the Summer Universiade

Serbia men's national 3x3 team

- 2012, 2016, 2017, 2018, 2022, 2023 Champions FIBA 3x3 World Cup
- 2014 Runners-up FIBA 3x3 World Cup
- 2018, 2019, 2021, 2022, 2023 Champions FIBA 3x3 Europe Cup
- 2016 Runners-up FIBA 3x3 Europe Cup
- 2015 Third place Basketball at the 2015 European Games

Serbia men's national under-18 3x3 team

- 2010 Champions Basketball at the Youth Olympic Games
- 2012 Champions FIBA 3x3 Under-18 World Championships
- 2018 Runners-up FIBA Europe Under-18 3x3 Championships

==== International (women) ====
Games	Gold	Silver	Bronze	Total
Olympic Games	0	0	1	1
European Championship	2	0	1	3
Total	2	0	2	4

Serbia women's national basketball team:

- 2016 Third place Basketball at the Summer Olympics
- 2015 Champions EuroBasket Women
- 2019 Third place EuroBasket Women
- 2021 Champions EuroBasket Women
- 2009 Runners-up Mediterranean Games

Serbia women's national under-20 basketball team:

- 2007, 2018 Runners-up FIBA U20 Women's European Championship
- 2008 Third place FIBA U20 Women's European Championship

Serbia women's national under-18 and under-19 basketball team:

- 2005, 2007 Champions FIBA U18 Women's European Championship
- 2006 Runners-up FIBA U18 Women's European Championship
- 2012, 2013 Third place FIBA U18 Women's European Championship
- 2005 Runners-up FIBA Under-19 Women's Basketball World Cup
- 2007 Third place FIBA Under-19 Women's Basketball World Cup

Serbia women's national under-16 and under-17 basketball team:

- 2003 Champions FIBA Europe Under-16 Championship for Women
- 1999, 2004 Runners-up FIBA Europe Under-16 Championship for Women

==== Club ====
Euroleague

- 1991–92 winners: Partizan

FIBA Saporta Cup
- 1973–74 winners Crvena zvezda
FIBA Korać Cup
- 1977–78, 1978–79, 1988–89 winners Partizan
ABA League
- 2007, 2008, 2009, 2010, 2011, 2013 winners Partizan
- 2014–15, 2015–16, 2016–17, 2018–19, 2020–21 winners Crvena zvezda
- 2003–04, 2005–06 winners KK FMP
- 2005 winners KK Vršac
ABA League Supercup
- 2018 winners Crvena zvezda
- 2019 winners Partizan
Junior ABA League
- 2017–18 winners Mega Bemax U19
- 2020–21 winners Mega Soccerbet U19
Euroleague Basketball Next Generation Tournament
- 2007–08 winners FMP
- 2008–09 winners FMP
- 2013–14 winners Crvena zvezda Telekom
- 2006–07, 2009–10 Runners-up FMP
- 2014–15, 2015–16 Runners-up Crvena zvezda Telekom
- 2016–17, 2018–19 Runners-up Mega Bemax
Serbian Basketball clubs in European competitions:
- KK Partizan in EuroLeague
- KK Partizan in Europe
- KK Crvena zvezda in international competitions
EuroLeague Women

- 1978–79 winners: ŽKK Crvena zvezda

=== Volleyball ===
==== International (men) ====
Games	Gold	Silver	Bronze	Total
Olympic Games	1	0	1	2
World Championship	0	1	1	2
European Championship	3	1	6	10
Total	4	2	8	14

Serbia men's national volleyball team:

- 2000 Champions, 1996 Third place Volleyball at the Summer Olympics
- 1998 Runners-up, 2010 Third place FIVB Volleyball Men's World Championship
- 2003 Third place FIVB Volleyball Men's World Cup
- 2001 Third place FIVB Volleyball World Grand Champions Cup
- 2016 Champions, 2003 2005 2008 2009 2015 Runners-up, 2002 2004 2010 Third place FIVB Volleyball World League
- 2001 2011 2019 Champions, 1997 Runners-up, 1995 1999 2005 2007 2013 2017 Third place Men's European Volleyball Championship
- 2005 Third place Mediterranean Games

Serbia men's national under-21 volleyball team

- 2011 Third place FIVB U21 World Championship

Serbia men's national under-19 volleyball team

- 2009 2011 Champions FIVB U19 World Championship
- 2011 Champions, 2009 Runners-up Boys' Youth European Volleyball Championship

==== International (women) ====
Games	Gold	Silver	Bronze	Total
Olympic Games	0	1	1	2
World Championship	2	0	1	3
European Championship	3	3	1	7
Total	5	4	3	12

Serbia women's national volleyball team:

- 2016 Runners-up Volleyball at the Summer Olympics
- 2020 Third place Volleyball at the Summer Olympics
- 2018, 2022 Champions, 2006 Third place FIVB Volleyball Women's World Championship
- 2011, 2017, 2019 Champions, 2007, 2021, 2023 Runners-up, 2015 Third place Women's European Volleyball Championship
- 2015 Runners-up FIVB Volleyball Women's World Cup
- 2011, 2013, 2017 Third place FIVB Volleyball World Grand Prix
- 2015 Third place European Games
- 2009, 2010, 2011 Champions, 2012 Third place Women's European Volleyball League

Serbia women's national under-20 volleyball team:

- 2014 Champions, 2010 2012 2016 Runners-up Europe U19 Championship

Serbia women's national under-18 volleyball team:

- 2009 Runners-up, 2011 Third place FIVB Volleyball Girls' U18 World Championship
- 2007, 2009, 2015 Runners-up, 2011 Third place Girls' Youth European Volleyball Championship

==== CEV Challenge Cup ====
- 2014–15 Champions Vojvodina NS Seme Novi Sad

=== Handball ===
==== International (men) ====
Games	Gold	Silver	Bronze	Total
World Championship	0	0	2	2
European Championship	0	1	1	2
Total	0	1	3	4

Serbia men's national handball team:

- 1999, 2001 Third place World Men's Handball Championship
- 2012 Runner-up, 1996 Third place European Men's Handball Championship
- 2009 Champions Handball at the Mediterranean Games

==== International (women) ====
Games	Gold	Silver	Bronze	Total
World Championship	0	1	1	2
Total	0	1	1	2

Serbia women's national handball team:

- 2013 Runner-up, 2001 Third place IHF World Women's Handball Championship
- 2013 Champions, 2005 Runner-up Handball at the Mediterranean Games

==== Club ====
EHF Champions League

- 1984–85 Champions League winners: Metaloplastika Šabac
- 1985–86 Champions League winners: Metaloplastika Šabac

EHF Women's Champions League

- 1975–76 Champions League winners: ŽRK Radnički Belgrade
- 1979–80 Champions League winners: ŽRK Radnički Belgrade
- 1983–84 Champions League winners: ŽRK Radnički Belgrade

==== EHF European Cup ====
- 2000–01 Champions RK Jugović Kać

=== Water polo ===
==== International ====
Games	Gold	Silver	Bronze	Total
Olympic Games	3	1	3	7
World Championship	3	2	3	8
European Championship	7	2	1	10
Total	13	5	7	25

Serbia men's national water polo team:

- 2016 Rio de Janeiro Champions Olympic Games
- 2020 Tokyo Champions Olympic Games
- 2024 Paris Champions Olympic Games
- 2004 Athens Runner-up Olympic Games
- 2000 Sydney, 2008 Beijing, 2012 London Third place Olympic Games
- 2005 Montreal, 2009 Rome, 2015 Kazan Champions World Championship
- 2001 Fukuoka, 2011 Shanghai Runner-up World Championship
- 1998 Perth, 2003 Barcelona, 2017 Budapest Third place World Championship
- 2006 Budapest, 2010 Oradea, 2014 Almaty Champions FINA World Cup
- 2002 Belgrade, 2018 Berlin Third place FINA World Cup
- 2005 Belgrade, 2006 Athens, 2007 Berlin, 2008 Genoa, 2010 Niš, 2011 Florence, 2013 Chelyabinsk, 2014 Dubai, 2015 Bergamo, 2016 Huizhou, 2017 Ruza, 2019 Belgrade Champions FINA World League
- 2004 Long Beach Runner-up FINA World League
- 2009 Podgorica Third place FINA World League
- 2001 Budapest, 2003 Kranj, 2006 Belgrade, 2012 Eindhoven, 2014 Budapest, 2016 Belgrade, 2018 Barcelona Champions European Championship
- 1997 Seville, 2008 Malaga Runner-up European Championship
- 2010 Zagreb Third place European Championship
- 1997 Bari, 2009 Pescara, 2018 Tarragona Champions Mediterranean Games
- 2005 Almeria Third place Mediterranean Games
- 2005 Izmir, 2011 Shenzhen, 2017 Taipei Champions Summer Universiade
- 2003 Daegu Runner-up Summer Universiade
- 2009 Belgrade, 2013 Kazan Third place Summer Universiade

Serbian water polo teams in junior categories won medals in the following competitions:

- FINA Junior Water Polo World Championships
- FINA Youth Water Polo World Championships
- LEN European U19 Water Polo Championship
- LEN European Junior Water Polo Championship

==== Club ====
LEN Champions League

- 1963–64 Champions League winners: Partizan
- 1965–66 Champions League winners: Partizan
- 1966–67 Champions League winners: Partizan
- 1970–71 Champions League winners: Partizan
- 1974–75 Champions League winners: Partizan
- 1975–76 Champions League winners: Partizan
- 1999–00 Champions League winners: Bečej
- 2010–11 Champions League winners: Partizan
- 2012–13 Champions League winners: Crvena zvezda

==== LEN Euro Cup ====
- 1997–98: Partizan
- 2012–13: Radnički Kragujevac

==== LEN Cup Winners' Cup ====
- 1990-91 Partizan

==== LEN Super Cup ====
- 1991 Partizan
- 2011 Partizan
- 2013 Crvena zvezda

=== Tennis ===
Players Grand Slam Singles-Doubles-Mixed Doubles

- Novak Djokovic (24)
  - Australian Open: 2008, 2011, 2012, 2013, 2015, 2016, 2019, 2020, 2021, 2023
  - Wimbledon: 2011, 2014, 2015, 2018, 2019, 2021, 2022
  - US Open: 2011, 2015, 2018, 2023
  - French Open: 2016, 2021, 2023
- Nenad Zimonjić (8)
  - Australian Open: 2004, 2008
  - Wimbledon: 2008, 2009, 2014
  - French Open: 2006, 2010, 2010
- Jelena Janković (1) - Wimbledon 2007
- Ana Ivanovic (1) - French Open 2008
- Monica Seles (8)
  - Australian Open: 1991, 1992, 1993
  - US Open: 1991, 1992
  - French Open: 1990, 1991, 1992
- Slobodan Živojinović (1) - US Open 1986

==== International ====
Davis Cup

- 2010 Davis Cup winners
- 2013 Davis Cup runner-up

ATP Cup

- 2020 ATP Cup winners

World Team Cup

- 2009 World Team Cup winners
- 2012 World Team Cup winners

Fed Cup

- 2012 Fed Cup runner-up

== Sporting infrastructure ==
- List of football stadiums in Serbia
- List of indoor arenas in Serbia

== Serbia in big competitions ==
- Serbia at the FIFA World Cup
- Serbia at the UEFA European Championship
- Serbia at the Olympics
- Serbia at the Paralympics
- Serbia at the European Games
- Serbia at the Universiade
- Serbia at the European Youth Olympic Festival
- Serbia at the Mediterranean Games
- Serbian football clubs in European competitions

== League system in Serbia ==
- Serbian football league system
- Serbian basketball league system

== Serbia sports award ==
- Serbian Footballer of the Year and Coach of the Year
- Serbian Basketball Player of the Year
- Awards of Olympic Committee of Serbia
- DSL Sport

== Serbian sports newspapers ==
- Sportski žurnal
- DSL Sport
- Tempo

== Anti-doping agency ==
The Anti-Doping Agency of the Republic of Serbia (ADAS) deals with the control of doping in sports in Serbia. Tests athletes at domestic and international competitions in the country, as well as when there is no competition, performs analyzes, determines the penalty after a possible violation of the rules, gives recommendations and advice to combat doping, etc. In November 2005, the Serbian Parliament adopted law on the prevention of doping in sports, which established the agency. In addition to athletes, ADAS also tests horses in equestrian sports. The agency punishes athletes who use funds from the illicit list, as well as coaches who give them to athletes. Penalties are most often in the form of a ban on competition for a certain period of time, sometimes for life, and there are also fines.

== Serbian supporter associations ==
Serbian fan groups have a long history. They follow their clubs at home matches, but also abroad. Many groups are extreme. Serbian fan groups are connected in fraternal relations with fans from Russia and Greece.

- Crveni Đavoli
- Delije
- Firma
- Grobari
- Marinci
- Meraklije
- Plava unija
- United Force

Interrupted matches:

- Partizan - Zrinjski Mostar UEFA expelled Partizan from the 2007–08 UEFA Cup due to crowd trouble at their away tie in Mostar, which forced the match to be interrupted for 10 minutes. UEFA adjudged travelling Partizan fans to have been the culprits of the trouble, but Partizan were allowed to play the return leg while the appeal was being processed. However, Partizan's appeal was rejected so Zrinjski Mostar qualified.
- Dinamo–Red Star riot It took the Zagreb police about 15 minutes to surround Zvezda's fans and calm them down, but it was not easy, because there was a big fight between the police and Zvezda's fans in which one police officer was seriously injured. Then, the Zagreb police managed to take Zvezda's fans, accompanied by them, to Maksimir Park, not far from the stadium, with the intention of keeping them there until the beginning of the game and escorting them to the stadium, but they did not succeed, because Zvezda the fans mostly pulled out of that hoop. In the very center of Zagreb, there were several fights, between Zvezda and Dinamo fans, in which two Dinamo fans were seriously injured. When the start of the match was approaching, the Zagreb police escorted Zvezda's fans (there were over 2,000 of them) to the south stand of the Maksimir Stadium. Even while the stands were filled with the audience, verbal skirmishes and standard name-calling of Zvezda and Dinamo fans started, followed by mutual insults, even on a national basis. As soon as a few minutes of the match were played, Dinamo fans of the "Bad Blue Boys" very easily broke down the protective fence on the north stand of the Maksimir Stadium. A physical confrontation between Dinamo and Zvezdaš followed, which lasted for almost an hour, and part of those riots were recorded by the cameras of TV Zagreb. Almost three hours after this unplayed match, Zvezda fans were detained at the demolished Maksimir Stadium. At that time, they were provided with buses that transported them to Dugo Selo, a suburb of Zagreb, and then they were taken by an emergency train to Belgrade, where they arrived in the morning hours of May 14, 1990.
- Serbia v Albania match was abandoned with the score at 0–0 shortly before halftime after "various incidents", which resulted in the Albania players refusing to return to the field. UEFA ruled that Albania had forfeited the match and awarded a 3–0 win to Serbia, but also deducted three points from Serbia for their involvement in the events. Serbia must also play their next two home qualifying games behind closed doors, and both the Serbian and Albanian FAs were fined €100,000. Both the Serbian and Albanian football associations were looking to have the decision revisited, but the decision was upheld by UEFA. Both associations then filed further appeals to the Court of Arbitration for Sport, and on 10 July 2015 the Court of Arbitration for Sport rejected the appeal filed by the Serbian FA, and upheld in part the appeal filed by the Albanian FA, meaning the match is deemed to have been forfeited by Serbia with 0–3 and they are still deducted three points. Serbian FA announced appeal at the Federal Supreme Court of Switzerland.
- Italy v Serbia match was abandoned after six minutes due to rioting by Serbian fans. The match was stopped after only six minutes due to riots caused by the visiting fans. The match was supposed to start at 20.50, but the start was postponed for more than half an hour because the visiting fans threw torches on the field, but also among the home spectators, and one fell very close to the home goalkeeper Viviani, so the referee decided to return the players to the locker rooms until the police bring order to the stadium. In the meantime, the police isolated Serbian fans in the stands and it seemed that the situation calmed down, so the match, after the appeal of the Serbian national team, started with a delay of 35 minutes. But after just a few minutes of play and new torches thrown into the pitch, Scottish referee Craig Thomson definitely stopped the match. On the eve of the match, a group of Serbian fans attacked goalkeeper Vladimir Stojković at the moment when the bus with Serbian players was heading towards the stadium. A more serious incident was prevented, but Stojković refused to defend, so Željko Brkić took his place in the first team. The UEFA Control and Disciplinary Body awarded the match as a 3–0 forfeit win to Italy.
- Serbia and Montenegro v Bosnia and Herzegovina played a deciding match on the last matchday of 2006 World Cup qualifying, The circumstances and high stakes made this an extremely important clash for Serbia. Not to mention the fact that both nations were parts of SFR Yugoslavia, which further raised the tensions. Going into the last matchday, Serbia-Montenegro was top of the group - two points ahead of second placed Spain and three points in spare compared to the third placed Bosnia-Herzegovina. Spain, however, was to play the minnows of the group San Marino and was virtually assured a win. With such highly probable scenario in the Spanish game, Serbia-Bosnia clash in Belgrade gained extra significance. The points advantage on top seemingly gave Serbia an advantage, but they still almost certainly needed a win because the match was mind-boggling. If the Belgrade score was to be tied, Serbia and Spain would then be equal on points at the top of the group and their two previous matches would have to decide who gets the first spot and automatic qualification. However, both of those games ended in ties (0-0 in Belgrade, 1–1 in Madrid), and according to FIFA rules, unlike UEFA's, away goals count for nothing, so goal difference would be the next deciding factor. That meant that if Bosnia managed to get a tie in Belgrade and Spain beat San Marino by a 4-goal margin, the Spaniards would be on top and Serbia would go into the playoffs. Bosnia was also not without a chance - if it managed to beat Serbia by any score in Belgrade, it would've become tied on points with Serbia, but would overtake it because the first match in Sarajevo ended in a 0–0 tie. Right from the start the tensions were extremely high, the stadium was packed . Mateja Kežman put the Serbs up in 7th minute, and the lead was not relinquished until the end. Serbia-Montenegro qualified directly for Germany 2006, sparking jubilant scenes all over Serbia & Montenegro. A physical confrontation followed, which was started by the fans of the home team, and torches, stones, parts of broken chairs flew to the tribune of BiH fans... UEFA then stood calmly and watched the clashes in the stands, the captain of Bosnia and Herzegovina, of the national team, Sergei Barbarez pointed out to the judges the war being waged in the stands, but no one reacted. BiH fans suffered serious injuries, and a fan comment that cheered on the visiting national team while showing a wound on their forehead spoke more than any other word that night.
- Serbia–Croatia semifinal (2012 European Men's Handball Championship) Events during the competition and later during the semifinal match: On 24 January 2012, after the match between Croatia and France, Serbian hooligans attacked Croatian fans in several locations in northern Serbia. In Novi Sad, Croatian supporters were heading home after the game, when they ran into a road block and some 50 masked men assaulted them with stones, bricks and axes, smashing windscreens. The attack left several supporters injured and one of them hospitalized. In Ruma, about 30 kilometres (19 mi) south from Novi Sad, a Croatian van was set on fire and one of the passengers stabbed with a knife.A day later the unrest continued and many cars were damaged, torched, or burnt out throughout Novi Sad. The Croatian Foreign Ministry officially complained to Serbian Ambassador Stanimir Vukicevic over the attacks; Vukicevic expressed regret and stated that the Serbian police was already taking the necessary steps. Thirteen people were arrested in connection with the incident, including Ivan Ključovski and Jovan Bajić, leaders of a fan group from Novi Sad, and a member of the Obraz right-wing organization. After questioning, all of them remained in custody for a month. Serbia and Croatia met in the semi-final of the tournament, which caused further concern on both sides. About 5,000 policemen were deployed to ensure the security of the fans, while in Croatia some tourist agencies cancelled trips for the match and the Croatian Handball Federation (Hrvatski rukometni savez, HRS) also recommended not to go to Serbia as the supporters' safety might not be guaranteed. Spokesman Zlatko Skrinjar also added that the HRS had planned to organize trips for the event, however, they changed their mind due to the incidents in the preceding days. On the Croatian-Serbian border, joint checkpoints were set up to prevent hooligans and other groups who have no ticket for the match to enter Serbia, and to escort the fans with tickets from the border to Belgrade. The police reported that there were no incidents during the match, which was eventually won by the Serbians 26–22, however, a bottle actually meant for Croatian playmaker Ivano Balić and coach Slavko Goluža hit Serbian back player Žarko Šešum, severely injuring his eye. Šešum's eye suffered significant bleeding. After the trauma he had only minimal vision on the affected eye, but the risk of permanent sight loss was reportedly averted. Morten Stig Christensen, Secretary of the Danish Handball Federation, Serbia's opponent in the final said that he was "severely shocked" by the incident and so were the people from the European Handball Federation with whom he spoke. Christensen also added that he was shocked that although there were more than five thousand security personnel at the stadium, the hooligans still managed to sneak in Roman candles and laser lights.

Serbian fans hold the record for the largest visit to the EuroCup Basketball

Highest attendance records:

- 24,232 attendance for Red Star Belgrade in a 79–70 win over Budivelnyk Kyiv, at Kombank Arena, Belgrade, on 26 March 2014.
- 22,736 attendance for Red Star Belgrade in a 63–52 win over UNICS Kazan, at Kombank Arena, Belgrade, on 2 April 2014.

Serbian fans hold the record for the largest visit to the Euroleague

Rank	Home team	Score	Away team	Attendance	Arena	Date	Ref
1	(Serbia) Partizan	63–56	(Greece) Panathinaikos	22,567	Belgrade Arena	5 March 2009	
2	(Serbia) Partizan	76–67	(Israel) Maccabi Tel Aviv	21,367	Belgrade Arena	1 April 2010	
3	(Serbia) Partizan	56–67	(Russia) CSKA Moscow	21,352	Belgrade Arena	31 March 2009	
4	(Serbia) Partizan	81–73	(Israel) Maccabi Tel Aviv	20,783	Belgrade Arena	30 March 2010	

Season averages Euroleague:

Season	Total gate	Games	Average	Change	High avg.	Team	Low avg.	Team
2013–14	2,063,600	248	8,130	+10.4%	12,578	(Serbia) Partizan NIS	3,960	(Ukraine) Budivelnyk
2014–15	2,013,305	251	8,184	+0.1%	14,483	(Serbia) Crvena Zvezda Telekom	1,949	(Poland) PGE Turów

== Rivals of Serbian clubs and national teams ==
Largest derbies:

- Derby of Serbia
- Eternal derby
- Crvena Zvezda–Partizan basketball rivalry
- Budućnost–Crvena Zvezda basketball rivalry

Belgrade derbies:

- OFK Belgrade vs. Red Star Belgrade
- OFK Belgrade vs. Partizan Belgrade
- Rad Belgrade vs. Red Star Belgrade
- OFK Belgrade vs. Rad Belgrade
- Rad Belgrade vs. Partizan Belgrade
- FK Voždovac vs. Rad Belgrade
- FK Zemun vs. OFK Belgrade, Partizan Belgrade or Red Star Belgrade

Others derbies:

- Novi Sad derby: Vojvodina Novi Sad vs. FK Novi Sad
- Derbi nizije (Lowland derby) or Derbi ravnice (Plain derby): Vojvodina Novi Sad vs. Spartak Subotica
- Political derby: FK Rad vs. FK Novi Pazar
- Šumadija derby: Radnički Kragujevac vs. FK Smederevo
- South Serbian derby: GFK Dubočica vs. Radnički Niš

National teams:

- Croatia–Serbia football rivalry
- Albania–Serbia football rivalry
- Croatia–Serbia basketball rivalry

== Sport events hosted in Serbia ==
Multi Sport Events

- 2007 European Youth Summer Olympic Festival
- 2009 Summer Universiade

Aquatic sports

- 1973 World Aquatics Championships
- 2008 European Junior Swimming Championships
- 2011 European Junior Swimming Championships
- 2024 European Aquatics Championships

Athletics

- Belgrade Marathon, annually
- 1962 European Athletics Championships
- 1969 European Indoor Games
- 2009 European Athletics Junior Championships
- 2013 European Cross Country Championships
- 2017 European Athletics Indoor Championships
- 2022 World Athletics Indoor Championships
- 2024 World Athletics Cross Country Championships

Basketball

- EuroBasket Women 1954
- EuroBasket 1961
- EuroBasket 1975
- 1988 FIBA Europe Under-18 Championship
- 2004 FIBA Diamond Ball
- 2005 EuroBasket
- 2007 FIBA Under-19 World Championship
- 2011 FIBA Europe Under-20 Championship for Women
- EuroBasket Women 2019 (alongside Latvia)
- 2018 FIBA U16 European Championship
- 2018 EuroLeague Final Four
- 2022 Euroleague Final For
- 2016 FIBA World Olympic Qualifying Tournament – Belgrade
- 2020 FIBA Men's Olympic Qualifying Tournaments – Belgrade

=== Boxing ===
- 1961 European Amateur Boxing Championships
- 1973 European Amateur Boxing Championships
- 1978 World Amateur Boxing Championships
- 1987 Boxing World Cup
- 2021 AIBA World Boxing Championships
- 2024 European Amateur Boxing Championships

Canoeing

- 1971 ICF Canoe Sprint World Championships
- 1975 ICF Canoe Sprint World Championships
- 1978 ICF Canoe Sprint World Championships
- 1982 ICF Canoe Sprint World Championships
- 2011 Canoe Sprint European Championships
- 2018 Canoe Sprint European Championships

Chess

- 1990 29th Chess Olympiad
- 2009 European Team Chess Championship
- 2013 European Individual Chess Championship for Women

Cycling

- Tour de Serbie
- 2021 European Mountain Bike Championships

Fencing

- 2018 European Fencing Championships

Football

- UEFA Euro 1976
- 1973 European Cup Final
- 1979 UEFA Cup Final
- 2011 UEFA European Under-17 Football Championship

Futsal

- 2016 UEFA Futsal Championship

Gymnastics

- 1963 European Men's Artistic Gymnastics Championships

Handball

- 1957 World Women's Handball Championship
- 1973 World Women's Handball Championship
- 2012 European Men's Handball Championship
- 2012 European Women's Handball Championship
- 2013 World Women's Handball Championship

Judo

- 1989 World Judo Championships
- 2006 European Judo Open Championships
- 2007 European Judo Championships

Karate

- 1998 European Karate Championships
- 2010 World Karate Championships
- 2018 European Karate Championships

MMA

- UFC Fight Night: Medić vs. Rodriguez

Rowing

- 1932 European Rowing Championships
- 2014 European Rowing Championships
- 2023 World Rowing Championships

Shooting

- 1957 European Shooting Championships
- 1972 10m European Shooting Championships
- 2005 European Shooting Championships
- 2010 ISSF World Cup
- 2008 ISSF World Cup
- 2011 World Shotgun Championships
- 2011 European Shooting Championships

Table tennis

- 1974 Table Tennis European Championships
- 1981 World Table Tennis Championships
- 2007 Table Tennis European Championships
- 2009 Table Tennis European Championships
- 2010 Table Tennis European Championships
- 2003 European Youth Table Tennis Championships
- 1988 European Youth Table Tennis Championships

Taekwondo

- 2024 European Taekwondo Championships

Tennis

- Serbia Open, 2009–2012, 2021–2022
- Belgrade Open
- 2010 Davis Cup, World Group final
- 2013 Davis Cup, World Group final

Volleyball

- 1975 Men's European Volleyball Championship
- 1975 Women's European Volleyball Championship
- 2005 Men's European Volleyball Championship
- 2005 FIVB Volleyball World League, Final Round
- 2005 Men's European Volleyball Championship
- 2009 FIVB Volleyball World League, Final Round
- 2011 Women's European Volleyball Championship
- 2013 Boys' Youth European Volleyball Championship
- 2013 Girls' Youth European Volleyball Championship
- 2021 Women's European Volleyball Championship

Water polo

- 2002 FINA Water Polo World Cup
- 2005 FINA Men's Water Polo World League, Super Final
- 2006 Men's European Water Polo Championship
- 2006 Women's European Water Polo Championship
- 2010 FINA Men's Water Polo World League, Super Final
- 2016 Men's European Water Polo Championship
- 2016 Women's European Water Polo Championship
- 2019 FINA Men's Water Polo World League
- 2008 LEN European Junior Water Polo Championship Men's tournament
- 2017 LEN European Junior Water Polo Championship Women's tournament
- 2018 FINA Youth Water Polo World Championships Women's tournament

Weightlifting

- 1980 European Weightlifting Championships

Wrestling

- 2003 European Greco-Roman Wrestling Championships
- 2012 European Wrestling Championships
- 2017 European Wrestling Championships
- 2022 World Wrestling Championships
- 2023 World Wrestling Championships
