= Serbian Association of American Football =

Organization governing American football in Serbia

The Serbian Association of American Football (Serbian: Srpska Asocijacija Američkog Fudbala; SAAF) is an organization governing American football in Serbia. Based in Belgrade, it was founded in 2003. The current president is Nikola Davidović. Sponsor of the association is Meridian Sport.

== History ==
The Serbian Association of American Football was established in 2003. The first club was founded a year earlier in Sremska Mitrovica, known as Sirmium Legionaries. Soon after, teams such as Wild Boars Kragujevac, Wolves Belgrade, Panthers Pančevo, and Stids Nis were established, paving the way for the first season under the association's organization. Due to financial constraints, the initial league was played without proper equipment.

In 2006, four Serbian teams equipped for American football joined the SELAF League, a regional league covering Southeastern Europe. These clubs included Novi Sad Dukes, Wild Boars Kragujevac, Wolves Belgrade, and Sirmium Legionaries. The remaining 11 unequipped teams played a separate league divided into North and South groups based on geographical location. The following year, in 2007, the first fully equipped league season was played in Serbia, while seven unequipped teams played their final season without equipment. By 2008, all competing teams in Serbia possessed the necessary equipment.

The rules for American football in the national championship do not follow NFL regulations but NCAA rules, which differ in certain aspects from professional American football league rules.

In 2008, there was a split within SAAF, leading to the formation of two parallel associations: SAFS, led mainly by Wild Boars Kragujevac and Belgrade Blue Dragons, and SAAF, formed by Wolves Belgrade, Novi Sad Dukes, and several other clubs. Fortunately, this period was short-lived, and by the 2011 season, the clubs reunited under a single association, as natural.

In that season, 20 clubs participated in the competition, divided into three divisions: Central, North, and South. The champions of Serbia were the Belgrade Vukovi, who defeated the home team Wild Boars in an exciting final match in Kragujevac, watched by over 1000 spectators.

The following three years saw continued dominance by Wolves, winning championships in 2012, 2013, and 2014. The next year, Novi Sad Dukes won their first title in club history, completing a perfect season with an undefeated victory of 25–23 over Vukovi Belgrade in the final. This victory also secured the CEFL League title, where the finalists competed alongside Silverhawks Ljubljana and Blue Devils Sinoplex.

Since 2016, Wild Boars Kragujevac have taken over, winning four consecutive titles. They defeated Vukovi Belgrade three times (2016, 2018, and 2019) and Novi Sad Dukes once in 2017.

== Presidents ==
- Vuk Dinčić (2010–2013)
- Rade Rakočević (2013–2017)
- Branko Vučinić (2017–2021)
- Nikola Davidović (2021–present)

== See more ==
- Serbia national American football team
- Nacionalna Liga Srbije
