= KK Partizan in international competitions =

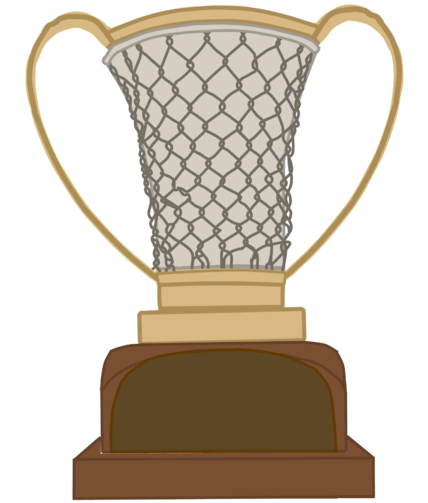
KK Partizan history and statistics in FIBA Europe and Euroleague Basketball (company) competitions. Košarkaški klub Partizan is a professional basketball club based in Belgrade, Serbia that competes in the Basketball League of Serbia, Adriatic League and Euroleague. The club was founded on 4 October 1945, as a basketball section of the Sports Association of the Central House of the Yugoslav Army.

The most significant trophy the club has won is the European Champion trophy at the Final Four of the Euroleague in Istanbul in 1992. KK Partizan was not allowed to defend the Euroleague title in the 1992–93 season, because of UN sanctions. They also won 3 Radivoj Korać Cups in 1978, 1979 and 1989. Other notable results include 3rd places in Champions Cup in 1982 and 1988, participation in Final Fours in 1998 and 2010, and Korać Cup final in 1974 and semifinal in 1975.

Partizan recorded its biggest win in European competitions on November 6, 1985 in Belgrade against DBV Charlottenburg (now ALBA Berlin). The final result was 129:79, with Partizan winning by 50 points. The biggest defeat happened on November 15, 2013 in Moscow when CSKA won by 42 points, 88:46.

== European competitions ==
| Record | Round | Opponent club | | | |
|---|---|---|---|---|---|
1966–67 FIBA European Cup Winners' Cup 2nd–tier
| 2–2 | 2nd round | (Turkey) İTÜ | 75–71 a | 80–50 h | |
| 2–2 | QF | (Italy) Ignis Varese | 55–83 a | 73–76 h | |
1973–74 FIBA Korać Cup 3rd–tier
| 5–5 | 2nd round | (Greece) YMCA Thessaloniki | 79–77 a | 88–63 h | |
| 5–5 | Top 12 | (Italy) Mobilquattro Milano | 84–64 h | 82–85 a | |
| 5–5 | Top 12 | (Spain) Juventud Schweppes | 83–87 a | 82–75 h | |
| 5–5 | SF | (Socialist Federal Republic of Yugoslavia) Jugoplastika | 108–97 h | 75–85 a | |
| 5–5 | F | (Italy) Forst Cantù | 86–99, April 4, Palazzetto dello Sport Parini, Cantù; 68–75, April 11, Hala sportova, Belgrade | | |
1974–75 FIBA Korać Cup 3rd–tier
| 8–4 | 1st round | (Switzerland) Vevey | 91–85 a | 102–80 h | |
| 8–4 | 2nd round | (France) Caen | 100–79 h | 87–90 a | |
| 8–4 | Top 16 | (Italy) Innocenti Milano | 88–104 a | 84–69 h | |
| 8–4 | Top 16 | (Belgium) Sunair Oostende | 97–85 a | 103–73 h | |
| 8–4 | Top 16 | (France) Tours | 110–80 h | 86–98 a | |
| 8–4 | SF | (Italy) Forst Cantù | 101–88 h | 67–84 a | |
1975–76 FIBA Korać Cup 3rd–tier
| 3–3 | 2nd round | Bye | Partizan qualified without games | | |
| 3–3 | Top 16 | (West Germany) 04 Leverkusen | 88–96 a | 96–83 h | |
| 3–3 | Top 16 | (Italy) Sinudyne Bologna | 99–82 h | 75–98 a | |
| 3–3 | Top 16 | (Bulgaria) Cherno More | 107–89 h | 102–118 a | |
1976–77 FIBA European Champions Cup 1st–tier
| 2–2 | 1st round | (Czechoslovakia) Spartak-Zbrojovka Brno | 85–96 h | 100–93 a | |
| 2–2 | 1st round | (Bulgaria) Academic | 98–113 a | 117–74 h | |
| 2–2 | 1st round | (Egypt) Al-Gezira | Al-Gezira withdrew without games | | |
1977–78 FIBA Korać Cup 3rd–tier
| 7–4 | 1st round | (Belgium) Anderlecht | 80–98 a | 110–87 h | |
| 7–4 | Top 16 | (France) Nice | 96–98 a | 99–85 h | |
| 7–4 | Top 16 | (Greece) AEK | 93–78 h | 99–88 a | |
| 7–4 | Top 16 | (Italy) Emerson Genova | 100–78 h | 86–94 a | |
| 7–4 | SF | (Spain) Juventud Freixenet | 109–114 a | 107–95 h | |
| 7–4 | F | (Socialist Federal Republic of Yugoslavia) Bosna | 117–110; April 21, Sportska dvorana Borik, Banja Luka | | |
1978–79 FIBA Korać Cup 3rd–tier
| 9–0 | 2nd round | Bye | Partizan qualified without games | | |
| 9–0 | Top 16 | (France) Olympique Antibes | 88–87 a | 90–83 h | |
| 9–0 | Top 16 | (Italy) Pagnossin Gorizia | 113–93 a | 111–89 h | |
| 9–0 | Top 16 | (Israel) Hapoel Haifa | 103–96 h | 93–89 a | |
| 9–0 | SF | (Socialist Federal Republic of Yugoslavia) Jugoplastika | 97–96 a | 98–96 h | |
| 9–0 | F | (Italy) Arrigoni Rieti | 108–98; March 20, Hala Pionir, Belgrade | | |
1979–80 FIBA European Champions Cup 1st–tier
| 6–10 | 1st round | (Albania) Partizani Tirana | 115–82 h | 98–101 a | |
| 6–10 | 1st round | (Syria) Al-Ittihad Aleppo | 111–67 h | 94–69 a | |
| 6–10 | 1st round | (Hungary) Honvéd | 110–107 a | 104–88 h | |
| 6–10 | SF | (Socialist Federal Republic of Yugoslavia) Bosna | 96–93 h | 86–93 a | |
| 6–10 | SF | (Spain) Real Madrid | 83–110 a | 87–100 h | |
| 6–10 | SF | (Netherlands) Nashua EBBC | 65–91 a | 77–83 h | |
| 6–10 | SF | (Italy) Sinudyne Bologna | 70–96 h | 84–90 a | |
| 6–10 | SF | (Israel) Maccabi Elite | 71–87 a | 91–95 h | |
1980–81 FIBA Korać Cup 3rd–tier
| 5–3 | 2nd round | (France) Caen | 84–83 a | 98–78 h | |
| 5–3 | Top 16 | (Belgium) Sunair Oostende | 112–94 h | 74–76 a | |
| 5–3 | Top 16 | (Spain) Joventut Freixenet | 104–87 h | 63–67 a | |
| 5–3 | Top 16 | (France) ASVEL | 81–96 a | 116–89 h | |
1981–82 FIBA European Champions Cup 1st–tier
| 10–4 | 1st round | (Egypt) Al-Zamalek | Al-Zamalek withdrew without games | | |
| 10–4 | 1st round | (Turkey) Eczacıbaşı | 94–79 h | 85–72 a | |
| 10–4 | 1st round | (Czechoslovakia) Slavia VŠ Praha | 99–97 a | 85–80 h | |
| 10–4 | SF | (Netherlands) Nashua EBBC | 105–76 h | 96–92 a | |
| 10–4 | SF | (Italy) Squibb Cantù | 74–90 a | 104–89 h | |
| 10–4 | SF | (Israel) Maccabi Elite | 83–84 h | 86–88 a | |
| 10–4 | SF | (Greece) Panathinaikos | 106–91 a | 98–83 h | |
| 10–4 | SF | (Spain) FC Barcelona | 117–98 h | 85–119 a | |
1982–83 FIBA Korać Cup 3rd–tier
| 3–3 | 2nd round | Bye | Partizan qualified without games | | |
| 3–3 | Top 16 | (Spain) Joventut Fichet | 117–97 h | 80–75 a | |
| 3–3 | Top 16 | (France) Monaco | 88–100 a | 91–102 h | |
| 3–3 | Top 16 | (Soviet Union) Dynamo Moscow | 110–102 h | 90–99 a | |
1983–84 FIBA Korać Cup 3rd–tier
| 1–1 | 2nd round | (Turkey) Eczacıbaşı | 72–93 a | 79–62 h | |
1985–86 FIBA Korać Cup 3rd–tier
| 7–3 | 1st round | (Luxembourg) Contern | 108–83 a | 101–60 h | |
| 7–3 | 2nd round | (West Germany) Charlottenburg | 96–89 a | 129–79 h | |
| 7–3 | Top 16 | (Italy) Mobilgirgi Caserta | 98–96 h | 81–102 a | |
| 7–3 | Top 16 | (Spain) Cacaolat Granollers | 110–88 h | 90–100 a | |
| 7–3 | Top 16 | (France) Orthez | 105–103 a | 94–105 h | |
1986–87 FIBA Korać Cup 3rd–tier
| 5–3 | 2nd round | (Greece) PAOK | 69–79 a | 90–75 h | |
| 5–3 | Top 16 | (Spain) CAI Zaragoza | 100–97 h | 91–98 a | |
| 5–3 | Top 16 | (Belgium) Assubel Mariembourg | 99–92 a | 109–93 h | |
| 5–3 | Top 16 | (Italy) Berloni Torino | 101–90 h | 90–91 a | |
1987–88 FIBA European Champions Cup 1st–tier
| 13–5 | Top 16 | (Hungary) Körmendi Dózsa | 130–94 a | 101–71 h | |
| 13–5 | QF | (Netherlands) Nashua EBBC | 101–94 h | 106–85 a | |
| 13–5 | QF | (Italy) Tracer Milano | 83–93 a | 92–85 h | |
| 13–5 | QF | (France) Orthez | 94–89 h | 73–70 a | |
| 13–5 | QF | (Spain) FC Barcelona | 88–84 a | 96–90 h | |
| 13–5 | QF | (Greece) Aris | 101–94 h | 87–96 a | |
| 13–5 | QF | (West Germany) Saturn Köln | 101–95 a | 99–110 h | |
| 13–5 | QF | (Israel) Maccabi Elite | 85–77 h | 84–98 a | |
| 13–5 | SF | (Israel) Maccabi Elite | 82–87; April 5, Flanders Expo, Ghent | | |
| 13–5 | 3rd place game | (Greece) Aris | 105–93; April 7, Flanders Expo, Ghent | | |
1988–89 FIBA Korać Cup 3rd–tier
| 10–2 | 2nd round | (Bulgaria) Levski-Spartak | 90–96 a | 128–79 h | |
| 10–2 | Top 16 | (Italy) Divarese Varese | 75–71 h | 77–75 a | |
| 10–2 | Top 16 | (Belgium) Assubel Mariembourg | 98–91 h | 108–102 a | |
| 10–2 | Top 16 | (Spain) Estudiantes Bosé | 76–66 a | 102–93 h | |
| 10–2 | SF | (Socialist Federal Republic of Yugoslavia) Zadar | 75–63 h | 88–84 a | |
| 10–2 | F | (Italy) Wiwa Vismara Cantù | 76–89, March 16, Palasport Pianella, Cucciago; 101–82, March 22, Hala sportova, Belgrade | | |
1989–90 FIBA European Cup Winners' Cup 2nd–tier
| 4–4 | Top 16 | (Cyprus) Apollon Limassol | 100–71 a | 82–68 h | |
| 4–4 | QF | (France) Mulhouse | 91–83 h | 71–80 a | |
| 4–4 | QF | (Spain) Real Madrid | 88–105 h | 76–101 a | |
| 4–4 | QF | (Greece) PAOK | 81–93 a | 95–79 h | |
1991–92 FIBA European League 1st–tier
| 15–6 | 2nd round | (Hungary) Szolnoki Olajbányász | 92–65 a | 89–72 h | |
| 15–6 | Top 16 | (Netherlands) Commodore Den Helder | 81–75 a | 111–77 h | |
| 15–6 | Top 16 | (Belgium) Racing Maes Pils Mechelen | 87–67 h | 72–86 a | |
| 15–6 | Top 16 | (Italy) Philips Milano | 86–70 h | 94–89 a | |
| 15–6 | Top 16 | (Spain) Montigalà Joventut | 76–79 a | 76–75 h | |
| 15–6 | Top 16 | (Germany) Bayer 04 Leverkusen | 73–80 a | 93–69 h | |
| 15–6 | Top 16 | (Spain) Estudiantes Caja Postal | 75–95 h | 72–75 a | |
| 15–6 | Top 16 | (Greece) Aris | 83–75 a | 99–65 h | |
| 15–6 | QF | (Italy) Knorr Bologna | 78–65 h | 60–61 a | 69–65 a |
| 15–6 | SF | (Italy) Philips Milano | 82–75; April 14, Abdi İpekçi Arena, Istanbul | | |
| 15–6 | F | (Spain) Montigalà Joventut | 71–70; April 16, Abdi İpekçi Arena, Istanbul | | |
1992–93 FIBA European League 1st–tier
| – | 2nd round | Bye | Partizan qualified without games | | |
| – | Top 16 | Bye | Partizan withdrew without games | | |
1995–96 FIBA European League 1st–tier
| 1–2 +1 draw | 1st round | (Bulgaria) Pleven | 93–83 a | 92–95 h | |
| 1–2 +1 draw | 2nd round | (Portugal) Benfica | 64–64 h | 95–112 a | |
1995–96 FIBA European Cup 2nd–tier
| 5–7 | 3rd round | (Israel) Hapoel Galil Elyon | 69–76 h | 87–64 a | |
| 5–7 | Top 12 | (Lithuania) Žalgiris | 90–99 h | 84–93 a | |
| 5–7 | Top 12 | (Israel) Bnei Herzliya | 98–85 h | 107–94 a | |
| 5–7 | Top 12 | (France) Limoges | 75–78 a | 103–90 h | |
| 5–7 | Top 12 | (Belgium) Sunair Oostende | 77–82 a | 88–67 h | |
| 5–7 | Top 12 | (Spain) Taugrés | 76–80 h | 88–99 a | |
1996–97 FIBA EuroLeague 1st–tier
| 10–9 | 1st round | (Spain) Caja San Fernando | 67–72 a | 66–72 h | |
| 10–9 | 1st round | (Turkey) Efes Pilsen | 76–72 h | 77–93 a | |
| 10–9 | 1st round | (France) Pau-Orthez | 84–75 h | 77–73 a | |
| 10–9 | 1st round | (Italy) Kinder Bologna | 83–100 a | 78–70 h | |
| 10–9 | 1st round | (Russia) Dynamo Moscow | 72–71 a | 97–64 h | |
| 10–9 | 2nd round | Croatia Osiguranje | 75–76 a | 71–82 h | |
| 10–9 | 2nd round | (Spain) FC Barcelona | 91–87 h | 73–75 a | |
| 10–9 | 2nd round | (Germany) Bayer 04 Leverkusen | 81–70 a | 89–76 h | |
| 10–9 | Top 16 | (Greece) Olympiacos | 71–81 h | 61–60 a | 69–74 h |
1997–98 FIBA EuroLeague 1st–tier
| 10–13 | 1st round | (Turkey) Ülker | 95–86 h | 81–80 a | |
| 10–13 | 1st round | (Spain) FC Barcelona | 71–87 a | 106–110 h | |
| 10–13 | 1st round | (Israel) Hapoel Jerusalem | 79–59 h | 84–88 a | |
| 10–13 | 1st round | (Italy) Kinder Bologna | 72–77 a | 49–74 h | |
| 10–13 | 1st round | (France) Pau-Orthez | 86–72 h | 70–74 a | |
| 10–13 | 2nd round | (Croatia) Cibona | 70–78 h | 66–84 a | |
| 10–13 | 2nd round | (Italy) Teamsystem Bologna | 82–85 a | 76–66 h | |
| 10–13 | 2nd round | (Greece) AEK | 71–73 h | 76–68 a | |
| 10–13 | Top 16 | (Greece) Olympiacos | 78–74 a | 72–60 h | – a |
| 10–13 | QF | (Russia) CSKA Moscow | 87–72 h | 52–77 a | 89–77 h |
| 10–13 | SF | (Italy) Kinder Bologna | 61–83; April 21, Palau Sant Jordi, Barcelona | | |
| 10–13 | 3rd place game | (Italy) Benetton Treviso | 89–96; April 23, Palau Sant Jordi, Barcelona | | |
1998–99 FIBA Saporta Cup 2nd–tier
| 12–3 +1 draw | 1st round | (Croatia) Zagreb | 76–64 h | 97–87 a | |
| 12–3 +1 draw | 1st round | (Hungary) Atomerőmű | 92–85 h | 84–64 a | |
| 12–3 +1 draw | 1st round | (Greece) AEK | 62–71 a | 87–82 h | |
| 12–3 +1 draw | 1st round | (Slovenia) Pivovarna Laško | 86–71 a | 89–68 h | |
| 12–3 +1 draw | 1st round | (Finland) Torpan Pojat | 95–81 h | 82–71 a | |
| 12–3 +1 draw | 2nd round | (Latvia) ASK Brocēni | 97–84 a | 87–89 h | |
| 12–3 +1 draw | 3rd round | (Turkey) Türk Telekom | 85–70 a | 76–43 h | |
| 12–3 +1 draw | QF | (Italy) Benetton Treviso | 77–90 a | 73–73 h | |

=== 2000–09 ===
| Season | Competition | Round | Opposition | Score |
|---|---|---|---|---|
| 1999-00 | Saporta Cup | Group E | (Austria) UKJ Suba Basketball | 70–67 (A), 91–66 (H) |
| 1999-00 | Saporta Cup | Group E | (Slovakia) Slovakofarma Pezinok | 70–65 (A), 89–93 (H) |
| 1999-00 | Saporta Cup | Group E | (Germany) Telekom Baskets Bonn | 76–70 (H), 68–77 (A) |
| 1999-00 | Saporta Cup | Group E | (Portugal) F.C. Porto | 79–73 (H), 66–69 (A) |
| 1999-00 | Saporta Cup | Group E | (Greece) Hercules | 71-79 (A), 54-60 (H) |
| 2000-01 | SuproLeague | Group B | (France) Pau-Orthez | 75–69 (H), 81–92 (A) |
| 2000-01 | SuproLeague | Group B | (Greece) Iraklis | 76–91 (A), 93–81 (H) |
| 2000-01 | SuproLeague | Group B | (Slovenia) Krka | 77–67 (H), 79–78 (A) |
| 2000-01 | SuproLeague | Group B | (Italy) Scavolini Victoria Libertas | 76–73 (H), 93–84 (A) |
| 2000-01 | SuproLeague | Group B | (Sweden) Plannja Basket | 90-81 (A), 99-88 (H) |
| 2000-01 | SuproLeague | Group B | (Belgium) Telindus Oostende | 89–80 (H), 88–94 (A) |
| 2000-01 | SuproLeague | Group B | (Turkey) Efes Pilsen Istanbul | 82–93 (A), 79–68 (H) |
| 2000-01 | SuproLeague | Group B | (Germany) TSV Bayer 04 | 108–99 (H), 81–95 (H) |
| 2000-01 | SuproLeague | Group B | (Israel) Maccabi Tel Aviv | 53–89 (A), 73–95 (H) |
| 2000-01 | SuproLeague | Round of 16 | (France) ASVEL Basket | 80–73 (H), 76–94 (A), 62-73 (H) |
| 2001-02 | Euroleague | Group D | (Belgium) Telindus Oostende | 86–77 (H), 94–104 (A) |
| 2001-02 | Euroleague | Group D | (Greece) AEK | 70–106 (A), 69–74 (H) |
| 2001-02 | Euroleague | Group D | (Russia) Ural Great | 85–80 (H), 111–100 (A) |
| 2001-02 | Euroleague | Group D | (Spain) Tau Ceramica Baskonia | 85–80 (A), 59–65 (H) |
| 2001-02 | Euroleague | Group D | (Croatia) Cibona | 81–76 (H), 71–85 (A) |
| 2001-02 | Euroleague | Group D | (Italy) Scavolini Victoria Libertas | 68-80 (A), 98-86 (H) |
| 2001-02 | Euroleague | Group D | (France) ASVEL Basket | 91–78 (A), 82–88 (H) |
| 2002-03 | Euroleague | Group C | (Spain) Real Madrid | 82–86 (H), 78–89 (A) |
| 2002-03 | Euroleague | Group C | (Russia) CSKA Moscow | 57–93 (A), 93–81 (H) |
| 2002-03 | Euroleague | Group C | (Italy) Virtus Bologna | 73–86 (H), 64–81 (A) |
| 2002-03 | Euroleague | Group C | (Greece) Olympiacos Piraeus | 80–78 (A), 81–71 (H) |
| 2002-03 | Euroleague | Group C | (Poland) Śląsk Wrocław | 85–86 (H), 74–83 (A) |
| 2002-03 | Euroleague | Group C | (France) ASVEL Basket | 79-71 (H), 103-104 (A) |
| 2002-03 | Euroleague | Group C | (Turkey) Ülker Gençlik | 74–84 (A), 86–90 (H) |
| 2003-04 | Euroleague | Group A | (Slovenia) Union Olimpija | 67–69 (A), 77–67 (H) |
| 2003-04 | Euroleague | Group A | (Turkey) Ülker Gençlik | 77–68 (H), 73–81 (A) |
| 2003-04 | Euroleague | Group A | (Italy) Lottomatica Virtus Roma | 77–63 (A), 73–81 (H) |
| 2003-04 | Euroleague | Group A | (Croatia) Cibona VIP | 93–81 (H), 69–92 (A) |
| 2003-04 | Euroleague | Group A | (France) Pau-Orthez | 78–81 (A), 75–77 (H) |
| 2003-04 | Euroleague | Group A | (Spain) FC Barcelona | 61-57 (H), 91-95 (A) |
| 2003-04 | Euroleague | Group A | (Greece) AEK | 92–95 (A), 78–71 (H) |
| 2004-05 | Euroleague | Group A | (Poland) Prokom Trefl | 64–66 (H), 68–76 (A) |
| 2004-05 | Euroleague | Group A | (Spain) Adecco Estudiantes | 59–71 (A), 83–77 (H) |
| 2004-05 | Euroleague | Group A | (Spain) Real Madrid | 87–92 (H), 66–82 (A) |
| 2004-05 | Euroleague | Group A | (Italy) Climamio Fortitudo Bologna | 91–103 (A), 85–88 (H) |
| 2004-05 | Euroleague | Group A | (Greece) Olympiacos Piraeus | 87–73 (H), 74–100 (A) |
| 2004-05 | Euroleague | Group A | (Croatia) Cibona VIP | 78-81 (H), 76-85 (A) |
| 2004-05 | Euroleague | Group A | (Turkey) Efes Pilsen Istanbul | 63–78 (A), 49–74 (H) |
| 2005-06 | Euroleague | Group C | (France) Pau-Orthez | 57–82 (H), 69–77 (A) |
| 2005-06 | Euroleague | Group C | (Italy) Montepaschi Mens Sana | 59–66 (A), 75–73 (H) |
| 2005-06 | Euroleague | Group C | (Spain) Real Madrid | 63–75 (H), 68–85 (A) |
| 2005-06 | Euroleague | Group C | (Greece) Panathinaikos Athens | 62–81 (A), 93–94 (H) |
| 2005-06 | Euroleague | Group C | (Turkey) Ülker Gençlik | 85–69 (A), 64–100 (H) |
| 2005-06 | Euroleague | Group C | (Spain) Unicaja Málaga | 67-86 (H), 79-83 (A) |
| 2005-06 | Euroleague | Group C | (Russia) CSKA Moscow | 58–89 (A), 79–92 (H) |
| 2006-07 | Euroleague | Group B | (Italy) Lottomatica Virtus Roma | 60–65 (A), 73–63 (H) |
| 2006-07 | Euroleague | Group B | (Israel) Maccabi Tel Aviv | 103–91 (H), 83–85 (A) |
| 2006-07 | Euroleague | Group B | (Spain) Joventut Badalona | 51–82 (A), 74–83 (H) |
| 2006-07 | Euroleague | Group B | (Croatia) Cibona VIP | 101–92 (H), 72–89 (A) |
| 2006-07 | Euroleague | Group B | (Slovenia) Union Olimpija | 71–70 (A), 106–60 (H) |
| 2006-07 | Euroleague | Group B | (Greece) Panathinaikos Athens | 65-73 (H), 93-80 (A) |
| 2006-07 | Euroleague | Group B | (Spain) Unicaja Málaga | 58–66 (A), 90–94 (H) |
| 2006-07 | Euroleague | Top 16 Group E | (Greece) Olympiacos Piraeus | 84–92 (H), 75–79 (A) |
| 2006-07 | Euroleague | Top 16 Group E | (Russia) CSKA Moscow | 44-67 (A), 55-86 (H) |
| 2006-07 | Euroleague | Top 16 Group E | (Spain) Joventut Badalona | 85-70 (H), 89-80 (A) |
| 2007-08 | Euroleague | Group C | (Spain) AXA FC Barcelona | 81–78 (H), 69–95 (A) |
| 2007-08 | Euroleague | Group C | (France) Chorale Roanne Basket | 88–87 (A), 82–76 (H) |
| 2007-08 | Euroleague | Group C | (Greece) Panathinaikos Athens | 90–94 (H), 66–67 (A) |
| 2007-08 | Euroleague | Group C | (Spain) Real Madrid | 64–75 (A), 72–80 (H) |
| 2007-08 | Euroleague | Group C | (Italy) Lottomatica Virtus Roma | 91–86 (H), 87–88 (A) |
| 2007-08 | Euroleague | Group C | (Germany) Brose Baskets | 62-78 (A), 85-37 (H) |
| 2007-08 | Euroleague | Group C | (Turkey) Fenerbahçe Ülker | 72–76 (H), 91–86 (A) |
| 2007-08 | Euroleague | Top 16 Group D | (Italy) Montepaschi Mens Sana | 54–71 (A), 78–75 (H) |
| 2007-08 | Euroleague | Top 16 Group D | (Greece) Panathinaikos Athens | 65-67 (A), 82-73 (H) |
| 2007-08 | Euroleague | Top 16 Group D | (Turkey) Efes Pilsen Istanbul | 78-65 (H), 83-79 (A) |
| 2007-08 | Euroleague | Quarterfinals | (Spain) Tau Ceramica Baskonia | 66-74 (A), 76-55 (H), 68-85 (A) |
| 2008-09 | Euroleague | Group D | (Turkey) Efes Pilsen Istanbul | 61–60 (A), 83–77 (H) |
| 2008-09 | Euroleague | Group D | (Spain) Real Madrid | 81–77 (H), 67–68 (A) |
| 2008-09 | Euroleague | Group D | (Italy) Armani Jeans Olimpia Milano | 81–76 (H), 59–73 (A) |
| 2008-09 | Euroleague | Group D | (Greece) Panionios | 67–72 (A), 80–57 (H) |
| 2008-09 | Euroleague | Group D | (Russia) CSKA Moscow | 62–63 (H), 66–63 (A) |
| 2008-09 | Euroleague | Top 16 Group G | (Greece) Panathinaikos Athens | 63-81 (A), 63-56 (H) |
| 2008-09 | Euroleague | Top 16 Group G | (Italy) Lottomatica Virtus Roma | 84–76 (H), 72–88 (A) |
| 2008-09 | Euroleague | Top 16 Group G | (Spain) Unicaja Málaga | 60–59 (H), 78–74 (A) |
| 2008-09 | Euroleague | Quarterfinals | (Russia) CSKA Moscow | 47-56 (A), 50-77 (A), 56-67 (H) |

=== 2010–19 ===
| Season | Competition | Round | Opposition | Score |
|---|---|---|---|---|
| 2009-10 | Euroleague | Group B | (Spain) Unicaja Málaga | 64–72 (H), 72–64 (A) |
| 2009-10 | Euroleague | Group B | (Turkey) Efes Pilsen Istanbul | 67–77 (A), 93–92 (H) |
| 2009-10 | Euroleague | Group B | (France) Entente Orléans Loiret | 78–71 (H), 72–75 (A) |
| 2009-10 | Euroleague | Group B | (Lithuania) Lietuvos Rytas Vilnius | 56–78 (A), 97–67 (H) |
| 2009-10 | Euroleague | Group B | (Greece) Olympiacos Piraeus | 86–80 (H), 60–81 (A) |
| 2009-10 | Euroleague | Top 16 Group E | (Greece) Panathinaikos Athens | 64-58 (A), 66-82 (H) |
| 2009-10 | Euroleague | Top 16 Group E | (Spain) Regal FC Barcelona | 67–66 (H), 64–82 (A) |
| 2009-10 | Euroleague | Top 16 Group E | (Greece) Maroussi Athens | 49–57 (A), 79–76 (H) |
| 2009-10 | Euroleague | Quarterfinals | (Israel) Maccabi Tel Aviv | 85-77 (A), 78-98 (A), 81-73 (H), 76-67 (H) |
| 2009-10 | Euroleague | Semifinals | (Greece) Olympiacos Piraeus | 80-83 |
| 2009-10 | Euroleague | Third-place playoff | (Russia) CSKA Moscow | 88-90 |
| 2010-11 | Euroleague | Group A | (Lithuania) Žalgiris Kaunas | 62–73 (A), 68–62 (H) |
| 2010-11 | Euroleague | Group A | (Russia) Khimki Moscow | 72–68 (H), 65–92 (A) |
| 2010-11 | Euroleague | Group A | (Israel) Maccabi Tel Aviv | 54–67 (H), 62-76 (A) |
| 2010-11 | Euroleague | Group A | (Poland) Asseco Prokom Gdynia | 69-62 (A), 61-59 (H) |
| 2010-11 | Euroleague | Group A | (Spain) Caja Laboral | 74-71 (H), 71-87 (A) |
| 2010-11 | Euroleague | Top 16 Group G | (Spain) Real Madrid | 58-78 (A), 56-61 (H) |
| 2010-11 | Euroleague | Top 16 Group G | (Turkey) Efes Pilsen Istanbul | 76-79 (H), 67-65 (A) |
| 2010-11 | Euroleague | Top 16 Group G | (Italy) Montepaschi Siena | 58-66 (H), 74-77 (A) |
| 2011–12 | Euroleague | Group C | (Turkey) Anadolu Efes | 73–84 (H), 58–67 (A) |
| 2011–12 | Euroleague | Group C | (Israel) Maccabi Tel Aviv | 66–70 (A), 74–71 (H) |
| 2011–12 | Euroleague | Group C | (Belgium) Spirou Basket | 91-81 (H), 79-84 (A) |
| 2011–12 | Euroleague | Group C | (Spain) Real Madrid | 80-79 (H), 83-101 (A) |
| 2011–12 | Euroleague | Group C | (Italy) EA7 Emporio Armani | 69-65 (A), 66-72 (H) |
| 2012–13 | Euroleague | Group D | (Turkey) Beşiktaş | 65-81 (A), 87-72 (H) |
| 2012–13 | Euroleague | Group D | (Russia) CSKA Moscow | 71-76 (H), 61-78 (A) |
| 2012–13 | Euroleague | Group D | (Lithuania) Lietuvos Rytas | 61-69 (A), 75-74 (H) |
| 2012–13 | Euroleague | Group D | (Spain) Regal FC Barcelona | 82-85 (A), 67-68 (H) |
| 2012–13 | Euroleague | Group D | (Germany) Brose Baskets | 72-77 (H), 90-92 (A) |
| 2013–14 | Euroleague | Group A | (Spain) FC Barcelona Regal | 60-67 (A), 64-82 (H) |
| 2013–14 | Euroleague | Group A | (France) JSF Nanterre | 73-43 (H), 61-62 (A) |
| 2013–14 | Euroleague | Group A | (Ukraine) Budivelnyk | 69-74 (A), 76-61 (H) |
| 2013–14 | Euroleague | Group A | (Turkey) Fenerbahçe Ülker | 78-88 (H), 79-77 (A) |
| 2013–14 | Euroleague | Group A | (Russia) CSKA Moscow | 46-88 (A), 62-73 (H) |
| 2013–14 | Euroleague | Top 16 Group F | (Spain) Real Madrid | 64–80 (H), 57-80 (A) |
| 2013–14 | Euroleague | Top 16 Group F | (Germany) FC Bayern Munich | 65–71 (A), 70-55 (H) |
| 2013–14 | Euroleague | Top 16 Group F | (Russia) CSKA Moscow | 73–72 (H), 52-84 (A) |
| 2013–14 | Euroleague | Top 16 Group F | (Russia) Lokomotiv Kuban | 81-87 (H), 73-84 (A) |
| 2013–14 | Euroleague | Top 16 Group F | (Israel) Maccabi Tel Aviv | 67-88 (A), 72–70 (H) |
| 2013–14 | Euroleague | Top 16 Group F | (Lithuania) Žalgiris Kaunas | 77-89 (A), 77–67 (H) |
| 2013–14 | Euroleague | Top 16 Group F | (Turkey) Galatasaray Liv Hospital | 70–78 (H), 55-64 (A) |
| 2014–15 | Eurocup | Group E | (Lithuania) Lietuvos Rytas | 65-92 (A), 76-85 (H) |
| 2014–15 | Eurocup | Group E | (Turkey) Banvit | 61-77 (H), 85-90 (A) |
| 2014–15 | Eurocup | Group E | (Israel) Hapoel Jerusalem | 79-82 (A), 64-83 (H) |
| 2014–15 | Eurocup | Group E | (Russia) Krasny Oktyabr | 59-61 (A), 84-70 (H) |
| 2014–15 | Eurocup | Group E | (Romania) Asesoft Ploiești | 76-69 (H), 85-65 (A) |
| 2016–17 | Champions League | Group E | (Germany) Ludwigsburg | 65-64 (A), 86-82 (H) |
| 2016–17 | Champions League | Group E | (Turkey) Beşiktaş | 62-77 (A), 86-71 (H) |
| 2016–17 | Champions League | Group E | (Poland) Zielona Góra | 58-56 (H), 81-80 (A) |
| 2016–17 | Champions League | Group E | (Hungary) Szolnoki Olaj | 70-55 (A), 77-67 (H) |
| 2016–17 | Champions League | Group E | (Belgium) Spirou | 70-84 (H), 65-63 (A) |
| 2016–17 | Champions League | Group E | (Greece) AEK Athens | 81–91 (A), 65-69 (H) |
| 2016–17 | Champions League | Group E | (Italy) Dinamo Sassari | 87–88 (H), 85-99 (A) |
| 2016–17 | Champions League | Play-offs qualifiers | (Greece) PAOK | 76–74 (A), 78-82 (H) |
| 2017–18 | EuroCup | Group C | (Germany) ALBA Berlin | 85-111 (A), 80-96 (H) |
| 2017–18 | EuroCup | Group C | (Lithuania) Lietuvos Rytas | 80-91 (H), 75-93 (A) |
| 2017–18 | EuroCup | Group C | (Spain) Bilbao Basket | 96-92 (A), 67-83 (H) |
| 2017–18 | EuroCup | Group C | (France) Limoges CSP | 83-92 (A), 98-101 (H) |
| 2017–18 | EuroCup | Group C | (Russia) Lokomotiv Kuban | 83-93 (H), 64-99 (A) |
| 2018–19 | EuroCup | Group C | (Italy) Aquila Basket Trento | 73-82 (A), 76-71 (H) |
| 2018–19 | EuroCup | Group C | (Russia) Zenit Saint Petersburg | 89-82 (H), 71-75 (A) |
| 2018–19 | EuroCup | Group C | (Spain) Valencia Basket | 71-79 (A), 61-69 (H) |
| 2018–19 | EuroCup | Group C | (France) ASVEL Basket | 78-75 (A), 78-89 (H) |
| 2018–19 | EuroCup | Group C | (Turkey) Türk Telekom B.K. | 87-72 (H), 72-77 (A) |
| 2018–19 | EuroCup | Top 16 Group E | (Lithuania) BC Rytas | 74-80 (A), 77-78 (H) |
| 2018–19 | EuroCup | Top 16 Group E | (Germany) Alba Berlin | 78-66 (H), 74-97 (A) |
| 2018–19 | EuroCup | Top 16 Group E | (France) AS Monaco Basket | 71-68 (A), 68-72 (H) |

=== 2020–present ===
| Season | Competition | Round | Opposition | Score |
|---|---|---|---|---|
| 2019–20 | EuroCup | Group B | (Italy) Reyer Venezia | 66-63 (A), 69-83 (H) |
| 2019–20 | EuroCup | Group B | (Turkey) Tofaş S.K. | 93-80 (H), 72-82 (A) |
| 2019–20 | EuroCup | Group B | (Lithuania) BC Rytas | 66-61 (A), 86-81 (H) |
| 2019–20 | EuroCup | Group B | (Russia) PBC Lokomotiv Kuban | 80-71 (H), 76-83 (A) |
| 2019–20 | EuroCup | Group B | (France) Limoges CSP | 82-60 (A), 77-58 (H) |
| 2019–20 | EuroCup | Top 16 Group E | (Italy) Virtus Pallacanestro Bologna | 99-81 (H), 84-82 (A) |
| 2019–20 | EuroCup | Top 16 Group E | (Italy) Aquila Basket Trento | 83-58 (A), 91-75 (H) |
| 2019–20 | EuroCup | Top 16 Group E | (Turkey) Darüşşafaka Basketbol | 63-65 (A), 69-57 (H) |
| 2019–20 | EuroCup | Quarter-finals | (Russia) UNICS Kazan | Competition postponed |
| 2020–21 | EuroCup | Group A | (Russia) UNICS Kazan | 89-86 (H), 70-93 (A) |
| 2020–21 | EuroCup | Group A | (Spain) Club Joventut Badalona | 78-75 (H), 82-85 (A) |
| 2020–21 | EuroCup | Group A | (Italy) Reyer Venezia | 95-73 (H), 79-59 (A) |
| 2020–21 | EuroCup | Group A | (France) JL Bourg Basket | 76-89 (H), 71-73 (A) |
| 2020–21 | EuroCup | Group A | (Turkey) Bahçeşehir Koleji S.K. | 88-75 (H), 82-76 (A) |
| 2020–21 | EuroCup | Top 16 Group F | (France) Metropolitans 92 | 70-75 (H), 62-79 (A) |
| 2020–21 | EuroCup | Top 16 Group F | (Russia) PBC Lokomotiv Kuban | 71-69 (H), 67-74 (A) |
| 2020–21 | EuroCup | Top 16 Group F | (Italy) Dolomiti Energia Trento | 71-43 (H), 54-69 (A) |
| 2021–22 | EuroCup | Group A | (Spain) MoraBanc Andorra | 95-70 (H), 60-61 (A) |
| 2021–22 | EuroCup | Group A | (Russia) ~~PBC Lokomotiv Kuban~~ | Lokomotiv ejected |
| 2021–22 | EuroCup | Group A | (Spain) Club Joventut Badalona | 68-67 (H), 84-92 (A) |
| 2021–22 | EuroCup | Group A | (Lithuania) BC Lietkabelis | 84-77 (H), 78-93 (A) |
| 2021–22 | EuroCup | Group A | (Italy) Dolomiti Energia Trento | 97-65 (H), 79−63 (A) |
| 2021–22 | EuroCup | Group A | (France) Metropolitans 92 | 87-72 (H), 89-82 (A) |
| 2021–22 | EuroCup | Group A | (Turkey) Türk Telekom B.K. | 85-59 (H), 71-85 (A) |
| 2021–22 | EuroCup | Group A | (Germany) Hamburg Towers | 102-77 (H), 106-97 (A) |
| 2021–22 | EuroCup | Group A | (Poland) Śląsk Wrocław | 75-73 (H), 93-71 (A) |
| 2021–22 | EuroCup | Eightfinals | (Turkey) Frutti Extra Bursaspor | 95-103 (H) |
| 2022–23 | EuroLeague | Regular season | (Germany) Alba Berlin | 84-100 (A), 88-74 (H) |
| 2022–23 | EuroLeague | Regular season | (Spain) Cazoo Baskonia | 96-103 (A), 83-65 (H) |
| 2022–23 | EuroLeague | Regular season | (Italy) EA7 Emporio Armani Milan | 75-80 (H), 62-76 (A) |
| 2022–23 | EuroLeague | Regular season | (Italy) Virtus Segafredo Bologna | 90-62 (H), 88-79 (A) |
| 2022–23 | EuroLeague | Regular season | (Lithuania) Žalgiris | 87-76 (H), 88-74 (A) |
| 2022–23 | EuroLeague | Regular season | (Greece) Panathinaikos | 91-89 (A), 83-81 (H) |
| 2022–23 | EuroLeague | Regular season | (Greece) Olympiacos | 58-87 (A), 90-75 (H) |
| 2022–23 | EuroLeague | Regular season | (Israel) Maccabi Playtika Tel Aviv | 96-88 (H), 81-90 (A) |
| 2022–23 | EuroLeague | Regular season | (Spain) Barcelona | 68-79 (A), 80-89 (H) |
| 2022–23 | EuroLeague | Regular season | (Spain) Real Madrid | 97-105 (A), 104-90 (H) |
| 2022–23 | EuroLeague | Regular season | (Spain) Valencia Basket | 96-100 (H), 81-89 (A) |
| 2022–23 | EuroLeague | Regular season | (Serbia) Crvena zvezda Meridianbet | 73-76 (H), 79-78 (A) |
| 2022–23 | EuroLeague | Regular season | (France) LDLC ASVEL | 87-91 (A), 92-71 (H) |
| 2022–23 | EuroLeague | Regular season | (Turkey) Anadolu Efes | 82-79 (H), 97-84 (A) |
| 2022–23 | EuroLeague | Regular season | (Turkey) Fenerbahçe Beko | 73-72 (A), 94-97 (H) |
| 2022–23 | EuroLeague | Regular season | (Germany) Bayern Munich | 83-77 (H), 82-71 (A) |
| 2022–23 | EuroLeague | Regular season | (France) AS Monaco | 100-80 (H), 88-84 (A) |
| 2022–23 | EuroLeague | Playoffs | (Spain) Real Madrid | 89-87 (A), 95-80 (A), 80-82 (H), 78-85 (H), 94-98 (A) |
| 2023–24 | EuroLeague | Regular season | (Germany) Alba Berlin | 89-74 (H), 94-83 (A) |
| 2023–24 | EuroLeague | Regular season | (Spain) Cazoo Baskonia | 83-84 (A), 87-83 (H) |
| 2023–24 | EuroLeague | Regular season | (Italy) EA7 Emporio Armani Milan | 82-69 (H), 83-85 (A) |
| 2023–24 | EuroLeague | Regular season | (Italy) Virtus Segafredo Bologna | 75-77 (H), 84-88 (A) |
| 2023–24 | EuroLeague | Regular season | (Lithuania) Žalgiris | 93-85 (A), 81-72 (H) |
| 2023–24 | EuroLeague | Regular season | (Greece) Panathinaikos | 92-87 (H), 71-84 (A) |
| 2023–24 | EuroLeague | Regular season | (Greece) Olympiacos | 94-98 (A), 69-74 (H) |
| 2023–24 | EuroLeague | Regular season | (Israel) Maccabi Playtika Tel Aviv | 81-96 (A), 88-79 (H) |
| 2023–24 | EuroLeague | Regular season | (Spain) Barcelona | 83-92 (H), 76-94 (A) |
| 2023–24 | EuroLeague | Regular season | (Spain) Real Madrid | 75-91 (A), 76-88 (H) |
| 2023–24 | EuroLeague | Regular season | (Spain) Valencia Basket | 72-67 (A), 79-66 (H) |
| 2023–24 | EuroLeague | Regular season | (Serbia) Crvena zvezda Meridianbet | 88-86 (H), 72-88 (A) |
| 2023–24 | EuroLeague | Regular season | (France) LDLC ASVEL | 88-62 (A), 90-77 (H) |
| 2023–24 | EuroLeague | Regular season | (Turkey) Anadolu Efes | 94-100 (A), 100-90 (H) |
| 2023–24 | EuroLeague | Regular season | (Turkey) Fenerbahçe Beko | 85-84 (H), 76-91 (A) |
| 2023–24 | EuroLeague | Regular season | (Germany) Bayern Munich | 85-94 (A), 78-79 (H) |
| 2023–24 | EuroLeague | Regular season | (France) AS Monaco | 89-85 (H), 70-85 (A) |

== Record ==
=== Biggest victory in Europe ===
| +50 | 1985–86 FIBA Korać Cup | 6–11–1985 | Partizan - (Germany) DBV Charlottenburg | 129–79 |

=== Biggest defeat in Europe ===
| +42 | 2013–14 Euroleague | 15–11–2013 | (Russia) CSKA Moscow - Partizan | 88–46 |

=== The most common opponents in Europe ===
| Opposition | P | W | L | P+ | P− | +/− |
|---|---|---|---|---|---|---|
| (Spain) Real Madrid | 29 | 5 | 24 | 2244 | 2510 | −266 |
| (Israel) Maccabi Playtika Tel Aviv | 25 | 9 | 16 | 1955 | 2086 | −131 |
| (Russia) CSKA Moscow | 21 | 5 | 16 | 1348 | 1621 | −273 |
| (Spain) Barcelona | 22 | 7 | 15 | 1740 | 1879 | −139 |
| (Spain) Club Joventut Badalona | 19 | 11 | 8 | 1579 | 1555 | +24 |
| (Turkey) Anadolu Efes | 20 | 11 | 9 | 1538 | 1576 | −38 |
| (Italy) Virtus Segafredo Bologna | 20 | 8 | 12 | 1535 | 1597 | −62 |
| (Greece) Olympiacos | 18 | 8 | 10 | 1369 | 1420 | −51 |
| (Greece) Panathinaikos | 18 | 9 | 9 | 1413 | 1421 | −8 |

== See also ==
- Yugoslav basketball clubs in European competitions
