= Serbia women's national under-23 volleyball team =

Serbia U23
- Association: Serbian Volleyball Federation
- Confederation: CEV

Uniforms
Home	Away

FIVB U23 World Championship
- Appearances: None
- Official website

The Serbia women's national under-23 volleyball team represented Serbia in international women's volleyball competitions and friendly matches under the age 23 until abolishment of U23 World Championship by FIVB. It was ruled by the Serbian Volleyball Federation that is an affiliate of International Volleyball Federation (FIVB) and also a part of European Volleyball Confederation (CEV).

== Results ==
=== FIVB U23 World Championship ===
Champions Runners up Third place Fourth place

FIVB U23 World Championship
Year	Round	Position	Pld	W	L	SW	SL	Squad
(Mexico) 2013	didn't qualify							
(Turkey) 2015	didn't qualify							
(Slovenia) 2017	didn't qualify							
Total	0 Titles	0/3						

== Team ==
=== Current squad ===
The following is the Serbia roster Under-23 team in the European Women's U23 World Qualification.

Head coach: (Serbia) Marijana Boričić

Name	Year of birth	Height	Weight	Spike	Block
Maja Aleksić	1997	1.88 m (6 ft 2 in)	72 kg (159 lb)	000 cm (0 in)	000 cm (0 in)
Vanja Bukilić	1999	1.91 m (6 ft 3 in)	70 kg (150 lb)	000 cm (0 in)	000 cm (0 in)
Bianka Buša	1994	1.87 m (6 ft 2 in)	74 kg (163 lb)	000 cm (0 in)	000 cm (0 in)
Katarina Čanak	1995	1.88 m (6 ft 2 in)	67 kg (148 lb)	000 cm (0 in)	000 cm (0 in)
Nataša Čikiriz	1995	1.94 m (6 ft 4 in)	74 kg (163 lb)	000 cm (0 in)	000 cm (0 in)
Aleksandra Ćirović	1997	1.75 m (5 ft 9 in)	57 kg (126 lb)	000 cm (0 in)	000 cm (0 in)
Milena Dimić	1997	1.70 m (5 ft 7 in)	64 kg (141 lb)	000 cm (0 in)	000 cm (0 in)
Jovana Kočić	1998	1.90 m (6 ft 3 in)	85 kg (187 lb)	000 cm (0 in)	000 cm (0 in)
Katarina Lazović	1999	1.78 m (5 ft 10 in)	60 kg (130 lb)	000 cm (0 in)	000 cm (0 in)
Sara Lozo	1997	1.86 m (6 ft 1 in)	61 kg (134 lb)	000 cm (0 in)	000 cm (0 in)
Katarina Marinković	1996	1.86 m (6 ft 1 in)	72 kg (159 lb)	000 cm (0 in)	000 cm (0 in)
Bojana Milenković	1997	1.85 m (6 ft 1 in)	70 kg (150 lb)	000 cm (0 in)	000 cm (0 in)
Ljubica Milojević	1999	1.90 m (6 ft 3 in)	70 kg (150 lb)	000 cm (0 in)	000 cm (0 in)
Tijana Milojević	1998	1.73 m (5 ft 8 in)	54 kg (119 lb)	000 cm (0 in)	000 cm (0 in)
Slađana Mirković	1995	1.85 m (6 ft 1 in)	78 kg (172 lb)	000 cm (0 in)	000 cm (0 in)
Mina Popović	1994	1.87 m (6 ft 2 in)	73 kg (161 lb)	000 cm (0 in)	000 cm (0 in)
Maja Savić	1993	1.89 m (6 ft 2 in)	70 kg (150 lb)	000 cm (0 in)	000 cm (0 in)
Anastasija Sekulić	1998	1.80 m (5 ft 11 in)	60 kg (130 lb)	000 cm (0 in)	000 cm (0 in)
Aleksandra Tadić	1997	1.74 m (5 ft 9 in)	60 kg (130 lb)	000 cm (0 in)	000 cm (0 in)
Milica Tasić	1999	1.83 m (6 ft 0 in)	65 kg (143 lb)	000 cm (0 in)	000 cm (0 in)
Anđela Veselinović	1999	1.75 m (5 ft 9 in)	55 kg (121 lb)	000 cm (0 in)	000 cm (0 in)
Jelena Vignjević	1996	1.80 m (5 ft 11 in)	65 kg (143 lb)	000 cm (0 in)	000 cm (0 in)
Sara Vučićević	1997	1.86 m (6 ft 1 in)	66 kg (146 lb)	000 cm (0 in)	000 cm (0 in)
Marija Vujnović	1997	1.82 m (6 ft 0 in)	65 kg (143 lb)	000 cm (0 in)	000 cm (0 in)
Jelena Vulin	1996	1.80 m (5 ft 11 in)	60 kg (130 lb)	000 cm (0 in)	000 cm (0 in)
