= FK Radnički Niš in European football =

- Club: Radnički Niš
- First entry: 1964–65 Intertoto Cup
- Latest entry: 2022–23 UEFA Europa Conference League

Radnički Niš is a professional football club, based in Niš, Serbia, founded in 1923.

The greatest success in European competitions was achieved in the 1981–82 season, when they reached the semifinals of UEFA Cup.

== Matches ==
=== UEFA Cup / UEFA Europa League ===
Season	Stage	Opponent		Date	Venue	Score	Agg
Season	Stage	Team	Country	Date	Venue	Score	Agg
1980–81	R1	LASK Linz	Austria	17 September 1980	Linzer Stadion, Linz	2–1	6–2
1980–81	R1	LASK Linz	Austria	1 October 1980	Čair Stadium, Niš	4–1	6–2
1980–81	R2	Beroe Stara Zagora	Bulgaria	22 October 1980	Beroe Stadium, Stara Zagora	1–0	3–1
1980–81	R2	Beroe Stara Zagora	Bulgaria	5 November 1980	Čair Stadium, Niš	2–1	3–1
1980–81	R3	AZ	Netherlands	26 November 1980	Čair Stadium, Niš	2–2	2–7
1980–81	R3	AZ	Netherlands	10 December 1980	Alkmaarderhout, Alkmaar	0–5	2–7
1981–82	R1	Napoli	Italy	16 September 1981	Stadio San Paolo, Naples	2–2	2–2 (a)
1981–82	R1	Napoli	Italy	30 September 1981	Čair Stadium, Niš	0–0	2–2 (a)
1981–82	R2	Grasshoppers	Switzerland	21 October 1981	Hardturm, Zürich	0–2	2–2 (3–0 p)
1981–82	R2	Grasshoppers	Switzerland	4 November 1981	Čair Stadium, Niš	2–0	2–2 (3–0 p)
1981–82	R3	Feyenoord	Netherlands	25 November 1981	Čair Stadium, Niš	2–0	2–1
1981–82	R3	Feyenoord	Netherlands	9 December 1981	De Kuip, Rotterdam	0–1	2–1
1981–82	QF	Dundee United	Scotland	3 March 1982	Tannadice, Dundee	0–2	3–2
1981–82	QF	Dundee United	Scotland	17 March 1982	Čair Stadium, Niš	3–0	3–2
1981–82	SF	Hamburg	West Germany	7 April 1982	Čair Stadium, Niš	2–1	3–6
1981–82	SF	Hamburg	West Germany	21 April 1982	Volksparkstadion, Hamburg	1–5	3–6
1983–84	R1	St. Gallen	Switzerland	14 September 1983	Čair Stadium, Niš	3–0	5–1
1983–84	R1	St. Gallen	Switzerland	27 September 1983	Espenmoos, St. Gallen	2–1	5–1
1983–84	R2	Inter Bratislava	Czechoslovakia	19 October 1983	Čair Stadium, Niš	4–0	6–3
1983–84	R2	Inter Bratislava	Czechoslovakia	2 November 1983	Štadión Pasienky, Bratislava	2–3	6–3
1983–84	R3	Hajduk Split	Yugoslavia	23 November 1983	Čair Stadium, Niš	0–2	0–4
1983–84	R3	Hajduk Split	Yugoslavia	7 December 1983	Stadion Poljud, Split	0–2	0–4
2018–19	QR1	Gżira United	Malta	12 July 2018	Čair Stadium, Niš	4–0	5–0
2018–19	QR1	Gżira United	Malta	19 July 2018	Centenary Stadium, Ta' Qali	1–0	5–0
2018–19	QR2	Maccabi Tel Aviv	Israel	26 July 2018	Netanya Stadium, Netanya	0–2	2–4
2018–19	QR2	Maccabi Tel Aviv	Israel	2 August 2018	Čair Stadium, Niš	2–2	2–4
2019–20	QR1	Flora	Estonia	11 July 2019	A. Le Coq Arena, Tallinn	0–2	2–4
2019–20	QR1	Flora	Estonia	18 July 2019	Čair Stadium, Niš	2–2	2–4

Notes

- QR: Qualifying round
- R1: First round
- R2: Second round
- R3: Third round
- QF: Quarter-finals
- SF: Semi-finals

=== UEFA Europa Conference League ===
Season	Stage	Opponent		Date	Venue	Score	Agg
Season	Stage	Team	Country	Date	Venue	Score	Agg
2022–23	QR2	Gżira United	Malta	21 Jul 2022	Centenary Stadium, Ta'Qali	2–2	5–5 (1–3 p)
2022–23	QR2	Gżira United	Malta	28 Jul 2022	Čair Stadium, Niš	3–3	5–5 (1–3 p)

=== UEFA Intertoto Cup ===
Season	Stage	Opponent		Date	Venue	Score	Agg
Season	Stage	Team	Country	Date	Venue	Score	Agg
1964-65	Group B2	Gwardia Warsaw	Poland	21 Jun 1964	WKS Gwardia, Warsaw	2–4	4th out of 4
1964-65	Group B2	Gwardia Warsaw	Poland	26 Jul 1964	Čair Stadium, Niš	5–1	4th out of 4
1964-65	Group B2	Empor Rostock	East Germany	28 Jun 1964	Čair Stadium, Niš	3–0	4th out of 4
1964-65	Group B2	Empor Rostock	East Germany	12 Jul 1964	Ostseestadion, Rostock	1–3	4th out of 4
1964-65	Group B2	Norrköping	Sweden	5 Jul 1964	Idrottspark, Norrköping	2–2	4th out of 4
1964-65	Group B2	Norrköping	Sweden	19 Jul 1964	Čair Stadium, Niš	0–2	4th out of 4
1965-66	Group B2	Zagłębie Sosnowiec	Poland	19 Jun 1965	Away	2–5	3rd out of 4
1965-66	Group B2	Zagłębie Sosnowiec	Poland	17 Jul 1965	Čair Stadium, Niš	0–0	3rd out of 4
1965-66	Group B2	Empor Rostock	East Germany	26 Jun 1965	Čair Stadium, Niš	2–1	3rd out of 4
1965-66	Group B2	Empor Rostock	East Germany	10 Jul 1965	Ostseestadion, Rostock	0–3	3rd out of 4
1965-66	Group B2	Košice	Czechoslovakia	3 Jul 1965	Čair Stadium, Niš	7–2	3rd out of 4
1965-66	Group B2	Košice	Czechoslovakia	24 Jul 1965	?, Košice	0–2	3rd out of 4
