= FK Vojvodina in European football =

Serbian football club match results

FK Vojvodina is a professional football club based in Novi Sad, Serbia.

== Matches ==
Only official matches included (European Cup / Champions League, Cup Winners' Cup, UEFA Cup / Europa League, UEFA Conference League & Inter-Cities Fairs Cup matches).

Season	Competition	Round	Country	Club	Home	Away	Aggregate
1961–62	Inter-Cities Fairs Cup	R1	(Italy)	Milan	2–0	0–0	2–0
1961–62	Inter-Cities Fairs Cup	R2	(Greece)	Iraklis	9–1	1–2	10–3
1961–62	Inter-Cities Fairs Cup	QF	(Hungary)	MTK	1–4	1–2	2–6
1962–63	Inter-Cities Fairs Cup	R1	(East Germany)	Leipzig XI	1–0	0–2	1–2
1964–65	Inter-Cities Fairs Cup	R1	(Bulgaria)	Lokomotiv Plovdiv	1–1	1–1	2–2 (0–2 Playoff)
1966–67	European Cup	R1	(Austria)	Admira Energie Vienna	0–0	1–0	1–0
1966–67	European Cup	R2	(Spain)	Atlético Madrid	2–0	1–3	3–3 (3–2 Playoff)
1966–67	European Cup	QF	(Scotland)	Celtic	1–0	0–2	1–2
1967–68	Inter-Cities Fairs Cup	R1	(Portugal)	GD CUF	1–0	3–1	4–1
1967–68	Inter-Cities Fairs Cup	R2	(East Germany)	Lokomotive Leipzig	0–0	2–0	2–0
1967–68	Inter-Cities Fairs Cup	R3	(Turkey)	Göztepe	1–0	1–0	2–0
1967–68	Inter-Cities Fairs Cup	QF	(Italy)	Bologna	0–2	0–0	0–2
1968–69	Inter-Cities Fairs Cup	R1	(Scotland)	Rangers	1–0	0–2	1–2
1969–70	Inter-Cities Fairs Cup	R1	(Poland)	Gwardia Warszawa	0–1	1–1	1–2
1972–73	UEFA Cup	R1	(Czechoslovakia)	Slovan Bratislava	1–2	0–6	1–8
1975–76	UEFA Cup	R1	(Greece)	AEK Athens	0–0	1–3	1–3
1989–90	European Cup	R1	(Hungary)	Budapest Honvéd FC	2–1	0–1	2–2 (a)
1996–97	UEFA Cup	QR1	(Northern Ireland)	Portdown FC	4–1	1–0	5–1
1996–97	UEFA Cup	QR2	(Austria)	Grazer AK	1–5	0–2	1–7
1997–98	UEFA Cup	QR	(Norway)	Viking FK	0–2	2–0 (a.e.t.)	2–2 (4–5 pen.)
1998–99	Intertoto Cup	R1	(Norway)	Stabæk	3–2	2–1	5–3
1998–99	Intertoto Cup	R2	(Sweden)	Örebro SK	2–0	2–0	4–0
1998–99	Intertoto Cup	R3	(Russia)	FC Baltika Kaliningrad	4–1	0–1	4–2
1998–99	Intertoto Cup	SF	(France)	SC Bastia	4–0	0–2	4–2
1998–99	Intertoto Cup	F	(Germany)	Werder Bremen	1–1	0–1	1–2
1999–00	UEFA Cup	QR	(Hungary)	Újpest FC	4–0	1–1	5–1
1999–00	UEFA Cup	R1	(Czech Republic)	SK Slavia Praha	0–0	2–3	2–3
2007–08	UEFA Cup	QR1	(Malta)	Hibernians FC	5–1	2–0	7–1
2007–08	UEFA Cup	QR2	(Spain)	Atlético Madrid	1–2	0–3	1–5
2008–09	UEFA Cup	QR1	(Azerbaijan)	Olimpik Baku	1–0	1–1	2–1
2008–09	UEFA Cup	QR2	(Israel)	Hapoel Tel Aviv	0–0	0–3	0–3
2009–10	Europa League	QR3	(Austria)	Austria Vienna	1–1	2–4	3–5
2011–12	Europa League	QR2	(Liechtenstein)	Vaduz	1–3	2–0	3–3 (a)
2012–13	Europa League	QR2	(Lithuania)	Sūduva Marijampolė	1–1	4–0	5–1
2012–13	Europa League	QR3	(Austria)	Rapid Wien	2–1	0–2	2–3
2013–14	Europa League	QR1	(Malta)	Hibernians FC	3–2	4–1	7–3
2013–14	Europa League	QR2	(Hungary)	Budapest Honvéd FC	2–0	3–1	5–1
2013–14	Europa League	QR3	(Turkey)	Bursaspor	2–2	3–0	5–2
2013–14	Europa League	PO	(Moldova)	FC Sheriff Tiraspol	1–1	1–2	2–3
2014–15	Europa League	QR2	(Slovakia)	AS Trenčín	3–0	0–4	3–4
2015–16	Europa League	QR1	(Hungary)	MTK Budapest	3–1	0–0	3–1
2015–16	Europa League	QR2	(Latvia)	Spartaks Jūrmala	3–0	1–1	4–1
2015–16	Europa League	QR3	(Italy)	Sampdoria	0–2	4–0	4–2
2015–16	Europa League	PO	(Czech Republic)	Viktoria Plzeň	0–2	0–3	0–5
2016–17	Europa League	QR1	(Montenegro)	Bokelj	5–0	1–1	6–1
2016–17	Europa League	QR2	(Wales)	Connah's Quay Nomads	1–0	2–1	3–1
2016–17	Europa League	QR3	(Belarus)	Dinamo Minsk	1–1	2–0	3–1
2016–17	Europa League	PO	(Netherlands)	AZ	0–3	0–0	0–3
2017–18	Europa League	QR1	(Slovakia)	Ružomberok	2–1	0–2	2–3
2020–21	Europa League	QR3	(Belgium)	Standard Liège	—N/a	1–2 (a.e.t.)	—N/a
2021–22	Conference League	QR2	(Lithuania)	Panevėžys	1–0	1–0	2–0
2021–22	Conference League	QR3	(Austria)	LASK	0–1	1–6	1–7
2023–24	Conference League	QR2	(Cyprus)	APOEL	1–2	1–2	2–4
2024–25	Europa League	QR2	(Netherlands)	Ajax	1–3	0–1	1–4
2024–25	Conference League	QR3	(Slovenia)	Maribor	1–0 (a.e.t.)	1–2	2–2 (2–4 pen.)
2026–27	UEFA Europa League	QR1	(Hungary)	Ferencváros	1–2	0–3	1–5
2026–27	UEFA Conference League	QR2	(Netherlands)	Ajax	1–4	1–4	2–8

== Overall record by country ==
As of 1 August 2026

FK Vojvodina record in European football by country
Opponents	Pld	W	D	L
Austria	10	2	3	5
Azerbaijan	2	1	1	0
Belarus	2	1	1	0
Belgium	1	0	0	1
Bulgaria	3	0	2	1
Czech Republic	4	0	1	3
Cyprus	2	0	0	2
France	2	1	0	1
Germany	6	2	2	2
Greece	4	1	1	2
Hungary	12	5	2	5
Israel	2	0	1	1
Italy	6	2	2	2
Latvia	2	1	1	0
Liechtenstein	2	1	0	1
Lithuania	4	3	1	0
Malta	4	4	0	0
Moldova	2	0	1	1
Montenegro	2	1	1	0
Netherlands	6	0	1	5
Northern Ireland	2	2	0	0
Norway	4	3	0	1
Poland	2	0	1	1
Portugal	2	2	0	0
Russia	2	1	0	1
Scotland	4	2	0	2
Slovakia	6	2	0	4
Slovenia	2	1	0	1
Spain	5	2	0	3
Sweden	2	2	0	0
Turkey	4	3	1	0
Wales	2	2	0	0
