= Serbia national American football team =

National American Football team representing Serbia

Serbia

General information
- Founded: 2003
- Colors: Red and white

Personnel
- Head coach: (Serbia) Bojan Kovačević

League / conference affiliations
- SAAF; IFAF Europe

Current uniform
Home

Away

The Serbian national American football team is the official men's American football senior national team of Serbia. They are organized by the Serbian Association of American Football (SAAF). They get their players from teams of the Central European Football League.

== European Championships ==
Serbia competed in European Championship B division along with Czech Republic, Great Britain and Italy. In 2012, Serbia won the European Championship C Division after beating Switzerland in the final and advanced to the B division. In 2013, Serbia won the 5th place in the European Championship B division after beating Spain 30–0.

In 2015, Serbia played in the qualifications for 2018 European Championship of American football. In the first round, Serbia won against Hungary 56-0 and qualified for the second round tournament in Italy. In the semifinals, Serbia recorded a win over Switzerland 17–0 but lost in the final match against the host Italy 14–17.

In 2019, IFAF created a new biyearly cycle. Serbia was placed in Group A - Division A with France and the Czech Republic. On October 27 Serbia defeated Czech Republic 16–00 at home in the city of Pozarevac. On November 9, against European champions France in Lille, Serbia lost 7–13 and missed a chance to qualify for the final tournament.

In 2020, Serbia was scheduled to play against Austria and, depending on results, another game against either Great Britain or Denmark, but due to the COVID-19 pandemic these matches were canceled.

== Roster ==
Squad for 2019 European Championship matches against Czech Republic and France:

Serbia national American Football team roster
Quarterbacks: Mladen Zlatić; David Hanomihi-Lukić; Running backs: Ivan Pleva; Mihailo Josović; Filip Vlajić; Mihailo Novaković; Aleksandar Ristić; Wide receivers: Miloš Kolibar; Stefan Borković; Davor Soldo; Tihomir Todorov; Filip Nedeljković; Milan Nikolić; Tight ends: Stefan Đurić; Bojan Nešić	Offensive linemen: Nikola Davidović; Srđan Aleksandrović; Stefan Drecun; Aleksandar Blažić; Aleksandar Stanković; Vladimir Ikraš; Dušan Radojević; Dejan Šarenac; Dragan Kovačević; Defensive linemen: Milorad Novaković; Dušan Novaković; Danilo Mijušković; Igor Timotijević; Miloš Janković; Uroš Josipović; Saša Jokić	Linebackers: Luka Vujnović; Predrag Šćekić; Strahinja Grujić; Nebojša Rajković; Mihajlo Miškiv; Lazar Bogićević; Defensive backs: Ivan Radojičić; Marko Bates; Aleksa Denović; Slavoljub Dukovski; Lazar Bućan; Aleksandar Borković; Nenad Andonović; Aleksandar Živanović; Nemanja Vučković; Goran Zec; Miloš Katić	Special team: Željko Stegnjaja; Coaching staff: Doug Adkins HC/OC; Predrag Durlić Vujić DC; Position/Assistant coaches: Predrag Šćekić; Vladislav Petković; Petar Vitorović; Ljubodrag Anđelković; Blažo Bojić; Josh Hepner; Miloš Grujičić; Lawrence Williams

== See also ==
- Nacionalna Liga Srbije
- Central European Football League
- EFAF European Championship
