= Arso Jovanović =

Yugoslav paritsan (1907–1948)

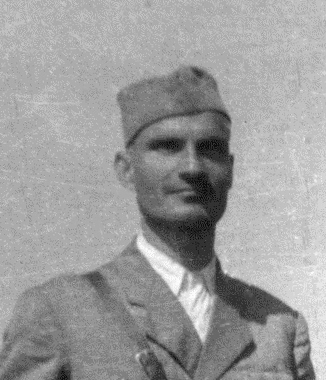
- Jovanović in 1943
- Born: Arsenije Jovanović; 24 March 1907; Zavala, Đurkovići near Podgorica, Montenegro
- Died: 12 August 1948 (aged 41)
- Military career
- Allegiance: Kingdom of Yugoslavia; SFR Yugoslavia
- Branch: Royal Yugoslav Army; Yugoslav Ground Forces
- Service years: 1924–1948
- Rank: Colonel General
- Nickname: Arso
- Commands: Chief of the General Staff
- Conflicts: World War II in Yugoslavia: Uprising in Montenegro; Battle of Pljevlja
- Awards: Order of Suvorov; Order of Kutuzov; Order of the White Lion; Order of the Cross of Grunwald; Order of the Yugoslav Flag; Order of the Partisan Star; Order of Merit for the People; Order of Brotherhood and Unity; Order of Bravery; Order of the Yugoslav Crown

Arsenije "Arso" Radivojev Jovanović (Serbian Cyrillic: Арсо Радивојев Јовановић; 24 March 1907 – 12 August 1948) was a Yugoslav partisan general and one of the country's foremost military commanders during World War II in Yugoslavia, serving as Chief of the Supreme Headquarters of the Yugoslav National Liberation Army.

Educated through the Royal Yugoslav Army academies, Jovanović was one of the best-educated generals among the partisan forces in Yugoslavia, speaking French, Russian and English. His military reports distinguished him, sometimes running to as many as ten pages, and he stayed close to the partisan High Command, lecturing in the first partisan officer school in Drvar, 1944. After the Tito–Stalin split in 1948, Jovanović openly sided with the Soviet Union. He was killed by Yugoslav border guards while trying to escape to Romania with two other Montenegrin dissidents, Vlado Dapčević and Branko Petričević, who were captured alive.

== Biography ==
Arso Jovanović was born in the village of Zavala, Đurkovići, near Podgorica, Principality of Montenegro on March 24, 1907, into a family belonging to the Piperi clan. His blood relative Blažo Jovanović was a prominent Montenegrin communist.

His father was, until 1910, an officer of the Royal Serbian Army, stationed with the artillery regiment in Topčider, a suburb of Belgrade, capital of the Kingdom of Serbia. Jovanović went to school in Podgorica, and then progressed to the Yugoslav Royal Army's Military Academy in Belgrade in 1925. There he was a contemporary of Velimir Terzić and Petar Ćetković, who would later also become significant commanders in the partisan forces during World War II. He graduated near the top of his class, and was appointed sergeant (platoon commander) in the 10th Infantry Regiment "Takovski", stationed in Sarajevo.

He went on to the Higher School of the Military Academy, where he studied several subject including tactics of war and French, graduating in 1934. During the interwar period, Jovanović authored a professional military study titled Tactics of the Infantry Battalion. He returned to Sarajevo where he became a commander of the cadet company at the School for Reserve Infantry Officers, until the Nazi German Invasion of Yugoslavia.

In 1934, he married Senka Vujić, a law clerk from Nikšić; together they had two daughters.

== The German invasion ==
When the German invasion started, Jovanović was a commander of the school battalion. He was subject to the Second Army Group under General Dragoslav Miljković. His task was to take action in the direction of Sarajevo - Travnik. An interesting fact is that here he served with a number of future high commanders in the army such as Dragoljub Mihailović, Major Miodrag Palošević and Major Radoslav Đurić. Following the breakdown of the front at Sarajevo on April 15, and the entry of a German armoured group into the city, Jovanović did not go forward to support Colonel Mihailović who was being attacked near Derventa. Instead he returned to his birthplace, unwilling to surrender to the enemy. There he awaited the famous 13 July uprising in Montenegro, in which he participated.

In these actions other active officers of the Kingdom of Yugoslavia who subsequently crossed over to the partisan lines also excelled themselves. Examples include infantry Colonel Savo Orović, reserve Lt. Colonel Veljko Bulatović, infantry Captain 1st Class Velimir Terzić and infantry Captain 1st Class Petar Ćetković. All fought then in the Royal Yugoslav Army that renounced the country's capitulation to the invaders, and later alongside the partisan units commanded by Peko Dapčević, Vlado Ćetković, Jovo Kapičić and others.

Since Montenegrins had traditionally held great affection for Russia, when the Soviet-German war broke out Montenegro rose in revolution. Despite the fact that plans and preparations for guerrilla warfare had not been made, a universal uprising was under way. Jovanović commanded his forces in a drive against the Italians near Crmnica, where they defeated one Italian battalion. Alone, Jovanović's unit captured 2,000 Italians and a significant amount of war equipment. Jovanović then joined the partisan forces.

== The partisan war ==
Jovanović was well received among the partisans. Due to his experience, he was assigned as chief of staff of the partisan guerrilla units for Montenegro and Boka. Until December, he was chief of staff for Montenegro.

Meanwhile, the Italian army had managed to transfer one army corps and three squadrons from Albania in order to quell the uprising. Jovanović found himself pressed between strong forces that slowly cleared the partisan units from the territory. He ordered a move towards Cetinje, where partisan units even managed to surround the Italian governor. The Italians however succeeded in deblocking Cetinje. Jovanović then ordered an attack on Kolašin and Šavnik but the enemy forces were too strong, and the partisans were forced to retreat.

Jovanović faced the ire of the people due to the deteriorating military situation. In this situation, he ordered a retreat on the entire front until the arrival of troops from Sandžak. For this action, 3,500 people were mobilised in Montenegro. On November 20, these forces commenced a march-manoeuvre in all parts of Montenegro. The main objectives were Kolašin, Mojkovac, Mioče, Donja Morača, Gornja Morača, Boan, Đurđevića Tara, Nikšić, Šavnik and Žabljak. Jovanović ordered his troops to take the city of Pljevlja at any cost, and manoeuvres were made to surround the city. The Battle of Pljevlja commenced on December 1 when the majority of the forces entered the city itself. Jovanović was among his fighters, and ordered charge, then retreat, followed by another charge. The Komski, "Bajo Pivljanin" and "Zetsko-lješanski" battalions all participated in this battle. The city was almost taken, but the enemy counter-attack was so strong that Jovanović had to order a retreat. The Axis forces suffered 74 dead, compared to 253 among the partisan units. Following this defeat partisans plundered villages and executed captured Italians, party "sectarians" and "perverts".

After the unsuccessful battle for Pljevlja, which was intended to connect the communist-controlled territory in Sandžak and Montenegro, Jovanović was called up to supreme command. He thought that he would be relieved of duty, but (instead of Captain Branko Poljanac) Jovanović was appointed on December 12, 1941, as head of the Supreme Command of Yugoslavia's partisan forces. He held this post until the end of the war. Jovanović wrote an extensive report on the uprising in Montenegro and the reasons for the unsuccessful attempt on Pljevlja. In this report he described the shortcomings of the partisan forces.

== After the war ==
When Joseph Stalin broke with Josip Broz Tito in 1948, Jovanović, along with other political and military personnel sided with the Soviet Union. According to the statement of the Interior Ministry on August 18, 1948, he was killed by Yugoslav border guards while trying to escape to Romania with Vlado Dapčević and Branko Petričević. His death is still a contested topic, with 29 possible versions. Most notably, in a Ljubljana court in 2000, the head of UDBA in the Yugoslav General Staff testified that he was at the meeting where the Chief of KOS in the Yugoslav Army, Jefto Šašić, killed Jovanović during an argument in Belgrade, and that he was personally involved in staging the Yugoslav-Romanian border incident.

According to the scholars Vlatka Vukelić and Vladimir Šumanović, in the initial years after the war Jovanović was "one of the most influential and most quoted figures of the restored Yugoslav state" but that after accepting the informbiro resolution in favor of the Soviet Union, he was declared an "enemy of the state" and "was literally cut out of the official Yugoslav account of World War II".

== See also ==
- Titoism
- Informbiro period
- Yugoslav Partisans

== Sources ==
- Vukelić, Vlatka; Šumanović, Vladimir (2018). "Arso Jovanović – an erased biography" (PDF). Balcanica Posnaniensia Acta et studia. 25: 161–180. doi:10.14746/bp.2018.25.10. S2CID 159061329.

Military offices
Preceded by Position established	Chief of the General Staff of the People's Liberation Army of Yugoslavia; 1 March – 11 September 1945	Succeeded by Koča Popović as Chief of the General Staff of the Yugoslav Army
