= Order of the People's Hero (Serbia and Montenegro) =

- Presented by: Serbia and Montenegro

Precedence
- Next (lower): Order of the Yugoslav Flag (1998–2006)

In 1998, the Federal Republic of Yugoslavia decided to award the Order of the People's Hero and decorated several military units, but no individuals.

Following the dissolution of SFR Yugoslavia, the Federal Republic of Yugoslavia was formed, and later renamed Serbia and Montenegro. In 1998, it passed a law that continued to use some of the decorations of former Yugoslavia, among them Order of the People's Hero, making it, at the time, the fourth-highest order after the Order of Yugoslavia, the Order of the Yugoslav Star and the Order of Freedom.

The Serbian media ridiculed several proposals to decorate Slobodan Milošević with the Order of the People's hero because he would have had to decorate himself. It was never given to any individuals, but several military units active in the Kosovo War were decorated:

The military units of the Kosovo War who received the order included:

- 125th Motorized Brigade, Military of Yugoslavia
- 549th Motorized Brigade, Military of Yugoslavia
- 37th Motorized Brigade, Military of Yugoslavia
- 63rd Parachute Brigade, Military of Yugoslavia
- 124th Police Intervention Brigade, Serbian Ministry of Internal Affairs
- 126th Air Surveillance Brigade, Military of Yugoslavia
- 250th Air Defence Missile Brigade, Military of Yugoslavia

== See also ==
- Orders and medals of Federal Republic of Yugoslavia
