= Orders, decorations, and medals of Yugoslavia =

Orders, decorations, and medals of Yugoslavia may refer to:

- Orders, decorations, and medals of the Kingdom of Yugoslavia
- Orders, decorations, and medals of the Socialist Federal Republic of Yugoslavia

== See also ==
- Orders, decorations, and medals of the Federal Republic of Yugoslavia (Serbia and Montenegro)
