= Velimir Terzić =

Yugoslav general and historian (1908–1983)

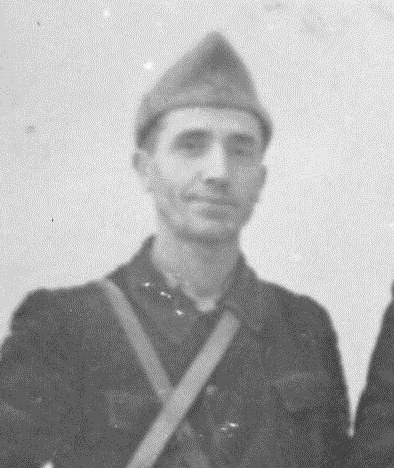
- Terzić in 1942
- Born: 26 May 1908; Golubovci, Montenegro
- Died: 13 December 1983 (aged 75); Belgrade, SR Serbia, SFR Yugoslavia
- Military career
- Allegiance: Kingdom of Yugoslavia, Democratic Federal Yugoslavia, Federal People's Republic of Yugoslavia
- Service years: 1924–1955
- Rank: Colonel General
- Conflicts: World War II in Yugoslavia: Invasion of Yugoslavia; Uprising in Montenegro; Operation Weiss; Operation Schwarz

Velimir Terzić (Serbian: Велимир Терзић; 26 May 1908 – 13 December 1983) was a Serbian and Yugoslav People's Army captain, partisan general, and historian.

== Military career ==
Terzić was born on 26 May 1908 in Golubovci, near Podgorica, Montenegro. Prior to World War II, he was captain of the Royal Yugoslav Army.

After Yugoslavia's defeat in the April War, he joined the Montenegrin partisans and took part in the 13 July Uprising. He commanded the Bijelo Polje unit. By the summer of 1942, he became the deputy of general Arso Jovanović, chief of the Partisan Supreme HQ. Terzić also commanded the main staff of Montenegro, was deputy commander of the 5th Montenegrin Proletarian brigade, chief of staff of the fifth operative zone and the main staff of Croatia. In April 1944, along with Milovan Djilas, he headed a Yugoslav military mission to the Soviet Union.

After the war, he remained in the Yugoslav People's Army and had many roles, including chief inspector and head of the Military Academy. He retired from the army in 1955 and became head of the Military History Institute (Vojno-istorijski institut) in Belgrade.

== Work as historian ==
In 1963, Terzić's Jugoslavija u aprìlskom ratu 1941 was published, a monograph which explored the reasons behind Yugoslavia's defeat in the April war. In it Terzić lists a Croatian fifth column as an important factor in the Yugoslav army's fall. He singles out Croatian Peasant Party leader Vladko Maček as having collaborated with the Ustaše and negotiating with the Axis powers, which led to a sedition among Croatian forces resulting in the collapse of the whole army. According to Terzić, many Croats abandoned Yugoslavia in favor of an independent Croatian state and enthusiastically welcomed German troops into Zagreb.

The historian Wayne S. Vucinich cites the book as among "the best studies of the coup d'état to appear in Yugoslavia" at the time but also notes that it was controversial. It sparked a wave of criticism in Croatia and condemnation from the Communist Party Press. Among the criticism levied at Terzić were that he relied on half-truths, poor sources and oversimplified the situation, in addition to ignoring the official Communist Party narrative for the Yugoslav capitulation. Stjepan Ščetarić, a scholar from Yugoslavia, criticized Terzić for focusing on the behavior of individual peoples as opposed to more pertinent issues, such as the relations between different Yugoslav nationalities, corruption and lack of preparation by the state and military leadership, as well as the broader aggression on the part of the Axis forces. Jozo Tomasevich writes that Terzić's claim that Maček left the government to negotiate with Germans without notifying anyone is wrong. He also says that the fifth column had little effect on the ultimate outcome of the invasion. The scholar Aleksa Djilas writes that "despite the considerable evidence" Terzić shows, he tends to overplay the Croatian desertion, as many Croatian units actively fought the Germans and most Croatian officers "remained loyal until 10 April when the NDH was proclaimed" which brought an end to Yugoslavia and in turn, their loyalty to the government. He adds that the army simply reflected the weak Yugoslav political system and the main reasons for the defeat were the lack of leadership, the army's subpar equipment and outdated tactical and strategical techniques.

During the 1960s, Yugoslav WWII historiography shifted from a "brotherhood and unity" narrative to debates between Serbian and Croatian nationalists about each group's role in the war, leading Josip Broz Tito and his Communist Party to repeatedly denounce "bourgeois nationalist tendencies" in historiography. Terzić's book exacerbated tensions. His work prompted another former Partisan general-turned historian, and future President of Croatia Franjo Tudjman to publish his own thesis in which he highlighted the impact of "Great Serbian hegemonism" of the Yugoslav Kingdom. The 1983 expanded edition of the book once again received sharp rebuke in Croatia, and contributed to the growth of Serbian nationalism. The historian Kenneth Morrison writes that it is an "exceptionally detailed analysis of the events that led to the dismemberment and occupation of Yugoslavia."

In August 1983, Terzić made the exaggerated claim that a million Serbs were killed at the Jasenovac concentration camp.

== Bibliography ==
- "Završne operacije Jugoslovenske Armije 1945 godine" in Istoriski Zapisi Vol. 18, Issue 2. (1961)
- Jugoslavija u aprìlskom ratu 1941 , Titograd; Grafički zavod. (1963)
- Slom Kraljevine Jugoslavije 1941, two vols. Belgrade; Narodna Knjiga. (1982-1983)

== Honours ==
Yugoslavian decorations
Order of the War Banner
Order of the Partisan Star
Order of Merits for the People
Commemorative Medal of the Partisans of 1941
International and foreign awards
Order of Suvorov, (Soviet Union)

== Sources ==
Books

- Joksimovic, Milan; Rajović, Radošin (1970). Jugoslovenski savremenici: Ko je ko u Jugoslaviji [Yugoslav contemporaries: Who's who in Yugoslavia]. Biblioteka Leksikon. Belgrade: Hronometar.
- Tomasevich, Jozo (2001). War and Revolution in Yugoslavia, 1941-1945: Occupation and Collaboration. Stanford University Press. ISBN 978-0-80477-924-1.
- Banac, Ivo (2008). The Diary of Georgi Dimitrov, 1933-1949. Yale University Press. ISBN 978-0-30013-385-1.
- Banac, Ivo (2019). "The Dissolution of Yugoslav Historiography". In Ramet, Sabrina P. (ed.). Beyond Yugoslavia: Politics, Economics, And Culture In A Shattered Community. Routledge. ISBN 978-0-42972-232-5.
- Vucinich, Wayne S. (2021) [1969]. "Nationalism and Communism". In Vucinich, Wayne S. (ed.). Contemporary Yugoslavia: Twenty Years of Socialist Experiment. University of California Press. ISBN 978-0-52033-110-5.
- Radonić, Ljiljana (2017). "Post-Socialist Politics of History in Croatia". In Luthar, Oto (ed.). Of Red Dragons and Evil Spirits: Post-Communist Historiography between Democratization and the New Politics of History. Central European University Press. ISBN 978-9-63386-151-6.
- Sindbaek, Tina (2012). Usable History?: Representations of Yugoslavia's Difficult Past from 1945 to 2002. ISD LLC. ISBN 978-8-77124-107-5.
- Calic, Marie-Janine (2019). A History of Yugoslavia (e-Pub ed.). Purdue University Press. ISBN 978-1-61249-564-4.
