= Order of the Yugoslav Star (Serbia and Montenegro) =

- Established: 1998
- Country: Serbia and Montenegro
- Status: Defunct (since 2006)

Precedence
- Next (higher): Order of Yugoslavia
- Next (lower): Order of Freedom

The Order of the Yugoslav Star was the second highest order of merit in Serbia and Montenegro.

After the Breakup of Yugoslavia, the Federal Republic of Yugoslavia (and later Serbia and Montenegro) continued to use some of the decorations of former Yugoslavia, among them Order of the Yugoslav Star. The new Law on Decorations was adopted in December 1998. The Law of 1998 made a distinction between the Order of the Yugoslav Great Star (single class) and the Order of the Yugoslav Star (three classes). In the Federal Republic of Yugoslavia, Order of the Yugoslav Great Star was the second highest order after the Order of Yugoslavia. The design of the insignia was not changed.

Recipients of the Great Star included:

- Muammar Gaddafi, leader of Libya – awarded on 26 October 1999 Muammar Gaddafi is the only person to be awarded both the SFRY Order of the Yugoslav Star and this Order.
- (China) Li Peng, Chairman of the Standing Committee of the National People's Congress – awarded on 12 June 2000
- Carlo Azeglio Ciampi, President of Italy – awarded on 17 January 2002
- Ion Iliescu, President of Romania – awarded on 30 August 2004

== See also ==
- Orders, decorations, and medals of the Federal Republic of Yugoslavia
