= Orders, decorations, and medals of Serbia =

State decorations of the Republic of Serbia (Serbian: Државна одликовања Републике Србије, romanized: Državna odlikovanja Republike Srbije) are regulated by the 2009 Law on Decorations.

Decorations are divided into three grades: orders, medals, and commemorative medals. There are six orders and three medals.

State decorations are awarded by the President of the Republic, typically at the ceremonies held twice per year - on the Statehood Day and Vidovdan. They can be awarded to citizens of the Republic of Serbia, domestic legal entities and other subjects, as well as to foreign citizens, foreign legal entities and international organizations. Honors may also be awarded posthumously.

Proposers for awarding awards can be state bodies, provincial bodies, local self-government bodies, the Serbian Academy of Sciences and Arts as well as other organizations and associations. In addition to the proposal for the award, the consent of a certain ministry must be obtained - the Ministry of Foreign Affairs (for foreign citizens), the Ministry of Defence (for members, units and institutions of the Serbian Armed Forces) and the Ministry of Internal Affairs (for members of the Police of Serbia). The President of the Republic can also award decorations on his own initiative.

== Current ==
=== Orders ===
	Ribbon	Order	Class	Native name
1		Order of the Republic of Serbia	1st class	Орден Републике Србије на великој огрлици
1		Order of the Republic of Serbia	2nd class	Орден Републике Србије на ленти
2		Order of the Serbian Flag	1st class	Орден српске заставе првог реда
2		Order of the Serbian Flag	2nd class	Орден српске заставе другог реда
2		Order of the Serbian Flag	3rd class	Орден српске заставе трећег реда
3		Order of Karađorđe's Star	1st class	Орден Карађорђеве звезде првог реда
3		Order of Karađorđe's Star	2nd class	Орден Карађорђеве звезде другог реда
3		Order of Karađorđe's Star	3rd class	Орден Карађорђеве звезде трећег реда
4		Sretenje Order	1st class	Сретењски орден првог реда
4		Sretenje Order	2nd class	Сретењски орден другог реда
4		Sretenje Order	3rd class	Сретењски орден трећег реда
5		Order of the White Eagle with Swords	1st class	Орден белог орла с мачевима првог реда
5		Order of the White Eagle with Swords	2nd class	Орден белог орла с мачевима другог реда
5		Order of the White Eagle with Swords	3rd class	Орден белог орла с мачевима трећег реда
6		Order of Merits in Defense and Security	1st class	Орден заслуга за одбрану и безбедност првог реда
6		Order of Merits in Defense and Security	2nd class	Орден заслуга за одбрану и безбедност другог реда
6		Order of Merits in Defense and Security	3rd class	Орден заслуга за одбрану и безбедност трећег реда

=== Medals ===
	Ribbon	Medal	Class	Native name
1		Medal for Bravery "Miloš Obilić"	Golden	Златна медаља за храброст "Милош Обилић"
1		Medal for Bravery "Miloš Obilić"	Silver	Сребрна медаља за храброст "Милош Обилић"
2		Medal for Merits	Golden	Златна медаља за заслуге
2		Medal for Merits	Silver	Сребрна медаља за заслуге
3		Medal for Merits in Defense and Security	Golden	Златна медаља за ревносну службу
3		Medal for Merits in Defense and Security	Silver	Сребрна медаља за ревносну службу

== Former ==
=== Orders ===
	Ribbon	Order	Native name	Notes
1	—	Order of Holy Prince Lazar	Орден Светог кнеза Лазара	Established in 1889, civil order.
2		Order of Karađorđe's Star	Орден Карађорђеве звезде	Established in 1904, civil and military order.
3		Order of Karađorđe's Star with Swords	Орден Карађорђеве звезде с мачевима	Established in 1912, military order.
4		Order of the White Eagle	Орден белог орла	Established in 1883, civil and military order.
5		Order of the White Eagle with Swords	Орден белог орла с мачевима	Established in 1915, military order.
6		Order of St. Sava	Орден Светог Саве	Established in 1883, disestablished in 1945, civil order.
7		Order of the Cross of Takovo	Орден Таковског крста	Established in 1865, reorganized in 1878, disestablished in 1903.
8		Order of the Cross of Takovo with Swords	Орден Таковског крста	Established in 1865, disestablished in 1903.
9		Order of Miloš the Great	Орден Милоша Великог	Established in 1898, disestablished in 1903.

=== Medals ===
	Ribbon	Order	Native name	Notes
1		Commemorative Medal of the Enthronement of King Peter I	Споменица крунисања Краља Петра Првог	
2		Commemorative Medal of the First Balkan War	Споменица Првог балканског рата	
3		Commemorative Medal of the Second Balkan War	Споменица Другог балканског рата	
4		Commemorative Medal for Loyalty to the Fatherland in 1915	Споменица за верност отаџбини 1915.	Established in 1920, disestablished in 1929.

== Gallery ==
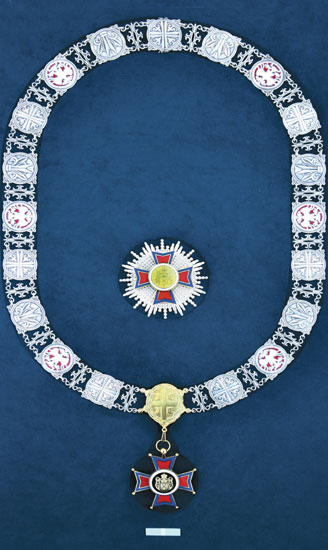
Order of the Republic of Serbia on grand necklace

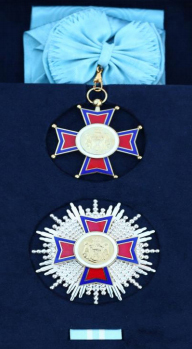
Order of the Republic of Serbia on ribbon

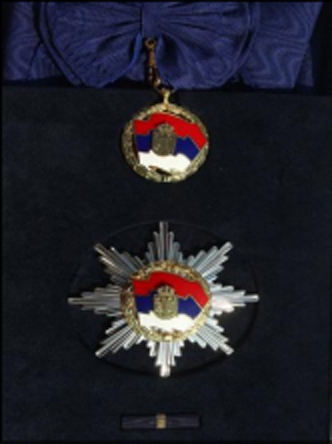
Order of the Serbian Flag 1st class

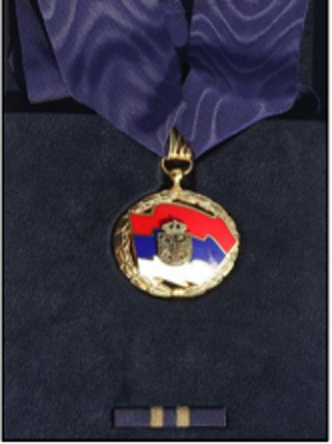
Order of the Serbian Flag 2nd class

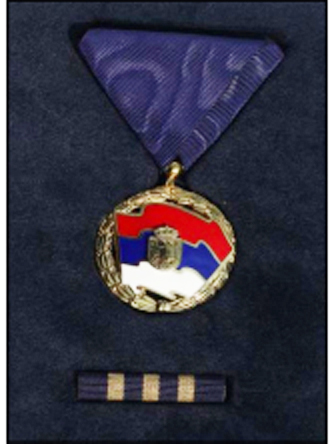
Order of the Serbian Flag 3rd class

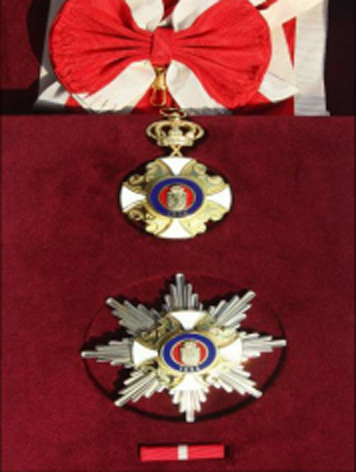
Order of Karađorđe's Star 1st class

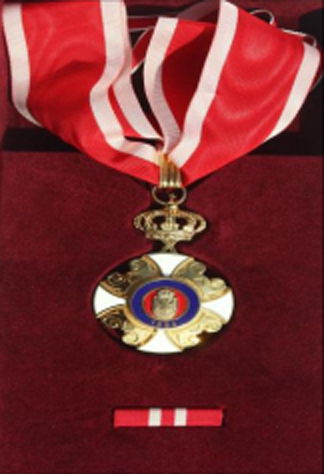
Order of Karađorđe's Star 2nd class

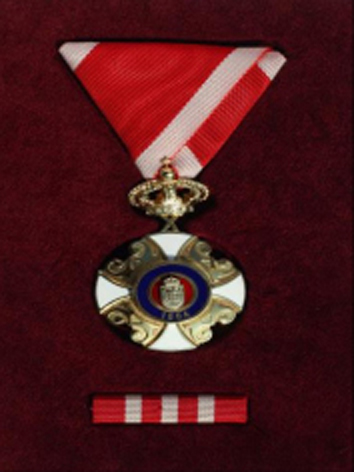
Order of Karađorđe's Star 3rd class

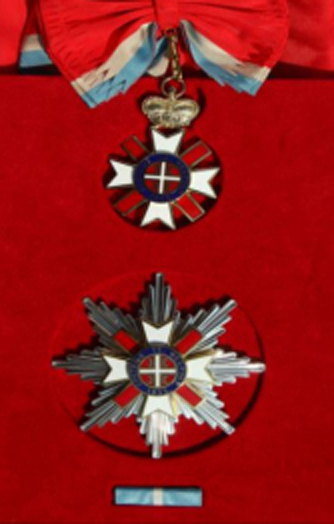
Sretenje Order 1st class

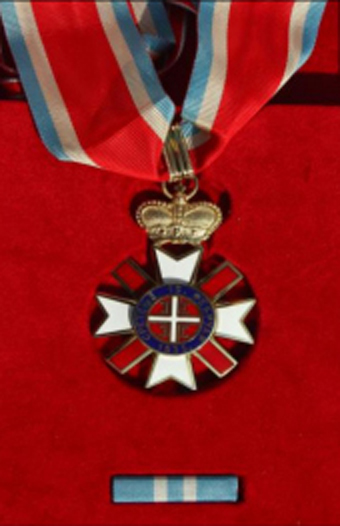
Sretenje Order 2nd class

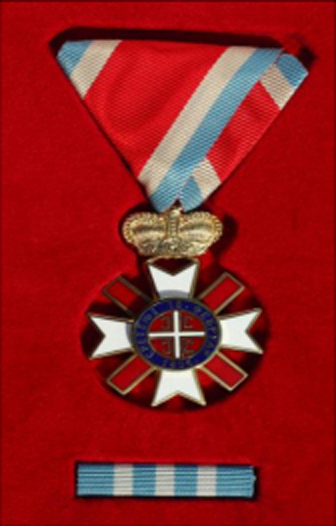
Sretenje Order 3rd class

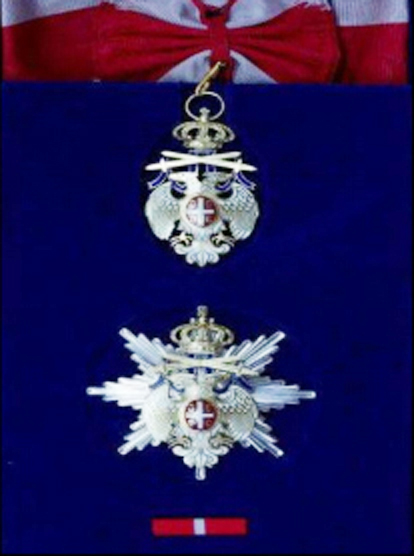
Order of the White Eagle with Swords 1st class

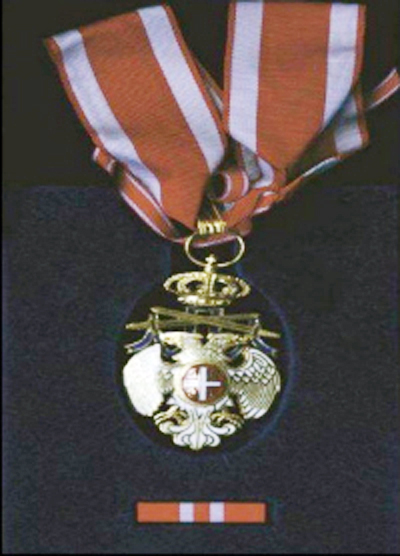
Order of the White Eagle with Swords 2nd class

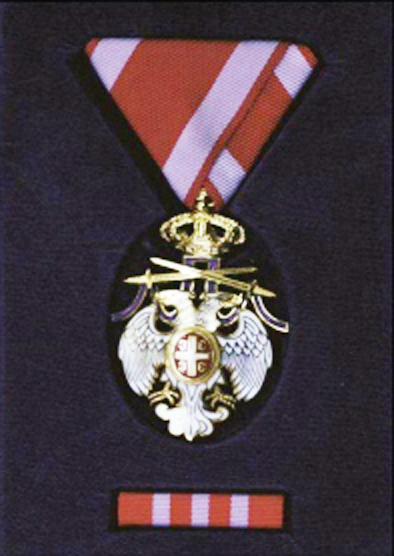
Order of the White Eagle with Swords 3rd class

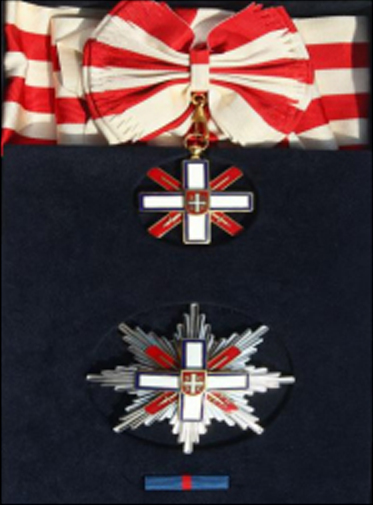
Order of Merits in Defense and Security 1st class

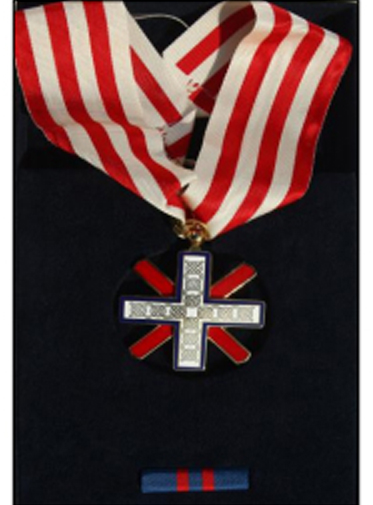
Order of Merits in Defense and Security 2nd class

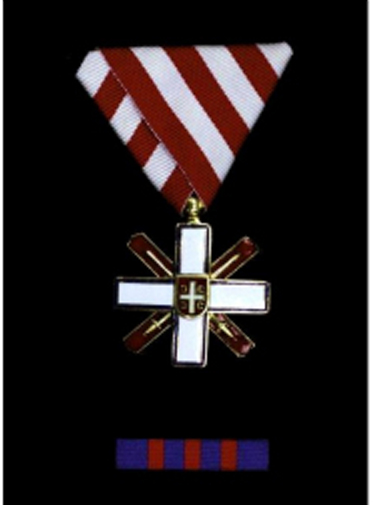
Order of Merits in Defense and Security 3rd class

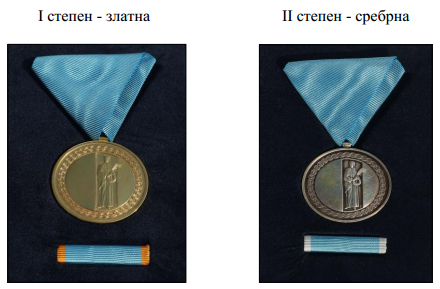
Medal for Merits

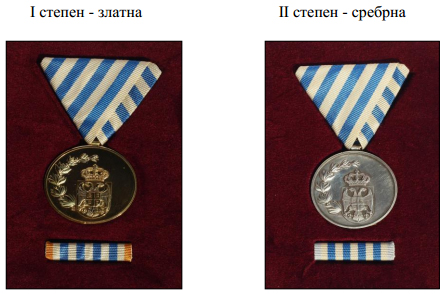
Medal for Merits in Defense and Security

== See also ==
- Orders, decorations, and medals of the Federal Republic of Yugoslavia
- Orders, decorations, and medals of the Socialist Federal Republic of Yugoslavia
- Orders, decorations, and medals of the Kingdom of Yugoslavia

== Sources ==
- Acović, Dragomir (2013). Слава и част: одликовања међу Србима: Срби међу одликовањима. Службени гласник, Београд. ISBN 978-86-519-1750-2.
- Acović, Dragomir (2019). Шест векова одликовања међу Србима. Политика, Београд. COBISS 279618316
- Car, Pavel; Muhić, Tomislav (2009). Odlikovanja Srbije i Jugoslavije: od 1859. do 1941. Wien: Militaria. COBISS 430956
- Dimitrijević, Vukadin (1998). Одликовања и војне ознаке Србије и Југославије. Удружење грађана "Стари Ниш"; Нумизматичко друштво "Медијана"; Клуб војске Југославије, Ниш: Просвета. COBISS 141659655
- Nikolić, Desanka (1971). Наша одликовања до 1941 : из колекције Војног музеја у Београду. Војни музеј, Београд: Просвета. COBISS 108440839
- Vasić Delimanović, Јелена (2015). "Новац и одликовања из времена династије Обреновић у Збирци за новац и медаље Музеја града Београда". Обреновићи у музејским и другим збиркама Србије и Европе (PDF). Музеј рудничко-таковског краја, Горњи Милановац; Службени гласник, Београд. pp. 155–186. COBISS 220541708
- Operativno odeljenje Vrhovne komande (1879). "XIV: Декорисање заслужних лица". Rat Srbije sa Turskom za oslobođenje i nezavisnost, 1877-78. godine. Državna štamparija. pp. 313–425.
