= Order of Bravery (Yugoslavia) =

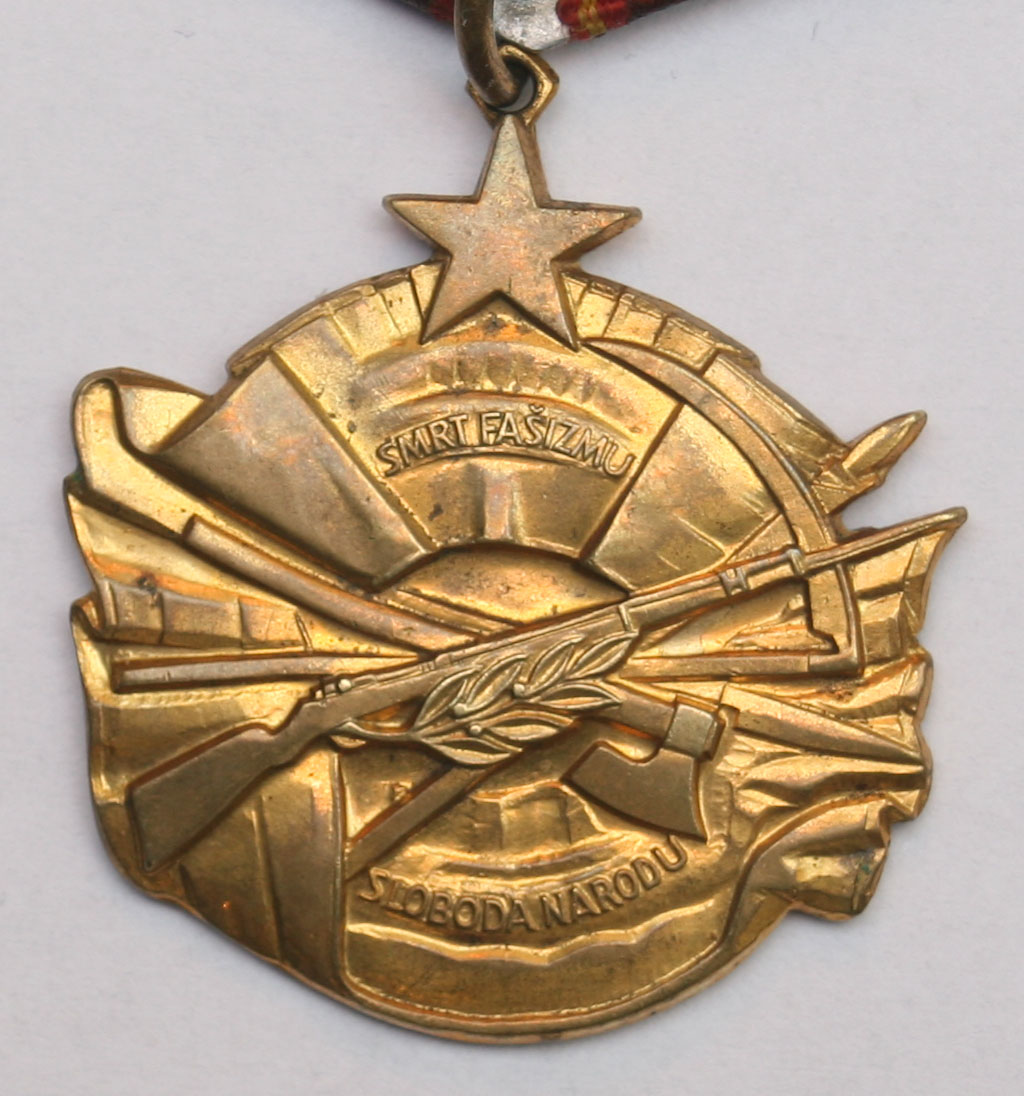
- Order of Bravery of the Socialist Yugoslavia
- Type: Order with one degree
- Awarded for: Distinguishing oneself by extraordinary brave deeds
- Presented by: SFR Yugoslavia
- Status: Dissolved
- First award: 1943

Highlights
- Total: 120,636
- Ribbon of the order

Precedence
- Next (higher): Order of Brotherhood and Unity (1945-1955); Order of Military Merits (1955-1992)
- Next (lower): Order of Labour (1945-1955); Lowest (1955-1992)
- Related: Medal for Bravery

The Order of Bravery was a Yugoslav gallantry medal, the twenty-third overall Yugoslav decoration.

It was awarded to individuals who distinguished themselves by extraordinary courageousness during war. The vast majority was awarded to Yugoslav Partisans for actions during the Second World War. A total of 120,636 orders were awarded in Yugoslavia.

== See also ==
- Orders and medals of Socialist Yugoslavia
- Orders and medals of Federal Republic of Yugoslavia
- The Order of Bravery of Yugoslavia - numbering issues.

== Sources ==
- Narodni heroji Jugoslavije (People's Heroes of Yugoslavia), "Mladost", Belgrade, 1975 (in Serbo-Croatian)
- Encyclopedia (1982). Narodni heroji Jugoslavije (People's Heroes of Yugoslavia) (in Serbo-Croatian). Belgrade and Titograd: Partizanska knjiga, Narodna knjiga, Pobjeda.
