= Order of Freedom (Serbia and Montenegro) =

- Type: Military decoration with one degree
- Country: Serbia and Montenegro

Statistics
- Total inductees: 2

Order of Freedom (Serbo-Croatian: Orden slobode, Орден слободе) was the highest military decoration awarded in Serbia and Montenegro.

After the breakup of Yugoslavia, the union of Serbia and Montenegro, formally Federal Republic of Yugoslavia until 2003, continued to use some of the decorations of former Yugoslavia, among them the Order of Freedom. It was awarded by the President of FR Yugoslavia (later President of Serbia and Montenegro). It was the highest military decoration in FR Yugoslavia, and the third highest state decoration overall, after the Order of Yugoslavia and the Yugoslav Great Star.

It was awarded 2 times in FR Yugoslavia, after the 1999 Kosovo War, to:

- (Serbia and Montenegro) Dragoljub Ojdanić — awarded on 26 November 1999
- (Serbia and Montenegro) Nebojša Pavković — awarded on 26 November 1999

== See also ==
- Order of Freedom (Yugoslavia)
- Orders, decorations, and medals of the Federal Republic of Yugoslavia
