= Zoran Terzić =

Serbian volleyball coach (born 1966)

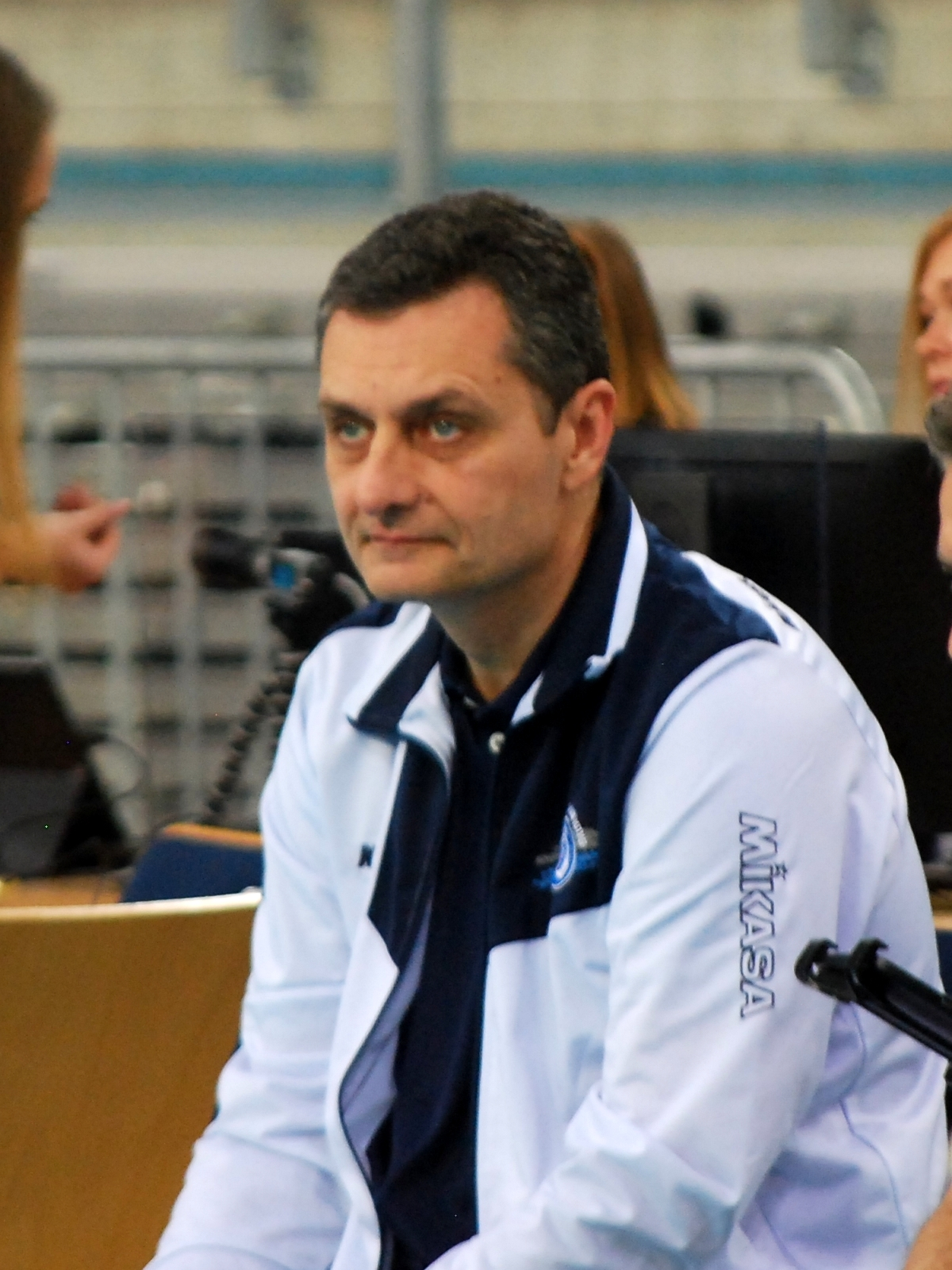

Personal information
- Nationality: Serbian
- Born: 9 July 1966 (age 60) Belgrade, SFR Yugoslavia

Coaching information
- Previous teams coached
- Years: Teams
- 2002–2021, 2025—; 2022–2024: (Serbia and Montenegro) / Serbia; Russia
Honours
Coach for Women's volleyball
Serbia and Montenegro / Serbia
Summer Olympics
| Silver medal – second place | 2016 Rio de Janeiro | Team |
| Bronze medal – third place | 2020 Tokyo | Team |
World Championship
| Gold medal – first place | 2018 Japan |
| Bronze medal – third place | 2006 Japan |
World Cup
| Silver medal – second place | 2015 Japan |
World Grand Prix
| Bronze medal – third place | 2011 Macau |
| Bronze medal – third place | 2013 Sapporo |
| Bronze medal – third place | 2017 Nanjing |
European Championship
| Gold medal – first place | 2011 Serbia/Italy |
| Gold medal – first place | 2017 Azerbaijan/Georgia |
| Gold medal – first place | 2019 Slovakia/Hungary/Poland/Turkey |
| Silver medal – second place | 2007 Belgium/Luxembourg |
| Silver medal – second place | 2021 Serbia/Croatia/Bulgaria/Romania |
| Bronze medal – third place | 2015 Netherlands/Belgium |
European Games
| Bronze medal – third place | 2015 Baku | Team |
European League
| Gold medal – first place | 2009 Kayseri |
| Gold medal – first place | 2010 Ankara |
| Gold medal – first place | 2011 Istanbul |
| Bronze medal – third place | 2012 Karlovy Vary |

Zoran Terzić (Serbian Cyrillic: Зоран Терзић, born 9 July 1966) is a Serbian volleyball coach. He was the coach of the Serbia women's national volleyball team between 2002 and 2022, and under his leadership the team won 20 European, World and Olympic medals. In 2024, Terzić was again named head coach of the Serbia women's national team. On club level he coaches WVC Dynamo Kazan.

As a player, Terzić passed through all selections of the Red Star club in Belgrade between 1979 and 1986. He stopped playing in order to pursue his studies. He graduated at the University of Belgrade's Faculty of Sport and Physical Education in 1998.

His first experience as a coach was as an assistant to Drago Nešić, head coach of the "IMT" Volleyball Club in Belgrade. In 1996, Terzić began working as a coach of the Red Star's junior team, with whom he won all available titles, from the championships of Belgrade to those of Serbia and FR Yugoslavia. At the suggestion of Aleksandar Boričić, head of the Red Star Volleyball Club, he started helping coach Red Star's women team, although it was not his original plan. Under Terzić's leadership, Red Star girls interrupted the 8-year winning streak of OK Jedinstvo Užice and won the 2001/02 and 2002/03 seasons of the National League.

Terzić took over the national team of FR Yugoslavia in 2002 (later Serbia and Montenegro and then Serbia), leading his teams to numerous successes, including a gold and bronze medal at the FIVB Volleyball Women's World Championship, an Olympic silver at Rio 2016 and bronze at Tokyo 2020, the European Championship titles in 2011, 2017 and 2019, and a silver at the 2015 World Cup.

On 17 January 2022, Terzić announced that he will not coach the national team anymore, as his contract with the National Organization has expired and they mutually agreed not to renew it again. Between 2022 and 2024, Terzić was the head coach of the Russia women's national volleyball team. During this period, the team did not play any competitive matches due to sanctions against Russia. In December 2024, Terzić was again hired to coach Serbia women's national team.

In 2022, Serbian president Aleksandar Vučić awarded Terzić the Sretenje Order, 2nd class, for his merits in sport.

== Club career ==
| Club | Seasons | Status/team |
|---|---|---|
| (Socialist Federal Republic of Yugoslavia) IMT Belgrade | 1986—1990 | Assistant coach |
| (Serbia and Montenegro) OK Crvena Zvezda | 1996—1998 | Youth team coach |
| (Serbia and Montenegro) OK Crvena Zvezda | 1998—2005 | Women's team coach |
| (Romania) Metal Galati | 2006—2010 | Women's team coach |
| (Italy) Despar Sirio Perugia | 2010—2011 | Women's team coach |
| (Romania) Dinamo Bucharest | 2011—2012 | Women's team coach |
| (Russia) Omichka Omsk | 2012—2015 | Women's team coach |
| (Romania) CSM Târgovişte | 2016 | Women's team coach |
| (Switzerland) Volero Zurich | 2016—2017 | Women's team coach |
| (Russia) WVC Dynamo Moscow | 2017—2018 | Women's team coach |
| (Turkey) Fenerbahçe SK | 2018—2023 | Women's team coach |
| (Russia) WVC Dinamo-Ak Bars | 2023—present | Women's team coach |

== National career ==
| Club | Seasons | Status/team |
|---|---|---|
| (Serbia and Montenegro) / SCG/Serbia | 2002—2022 | Women's team coach |
| Russia | 2022—2024 | Women's team coach |
| Serbia | 2025— | Women's team coach |
