= Order of the White Eagle with Swords =

Decoration of the Republic of Serbia

Order of the White Eagle with Swords Орден белог орла с мачевима
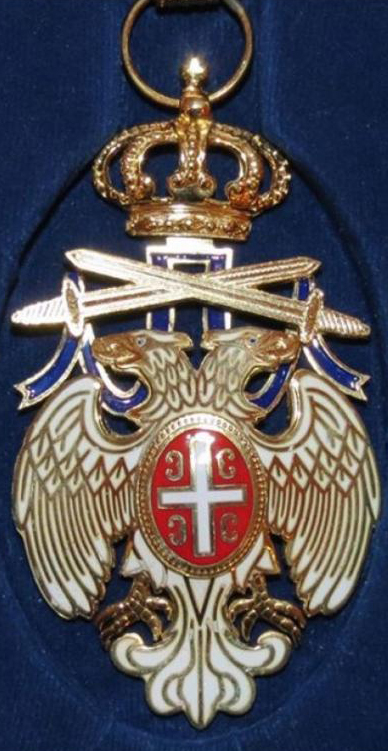

Awarded by Republic of Serbia
- Type: State order
- Eligibility: Serbian citizens and institutions
- Awarded for: Special merits in the development of the defense system of Serbia or in commanding, leading and training military units and institutions for the defense of Serbia
- Status: Active

Statistics
- First induction: 2009

Precedence
- Next (higher): Sretenje Order
- Next (lower): Order of Merits in Defense and Security
- 1st class; 2nd class; 3rd class; Ribbon bars of the order

Order of the White Eagle with Swords (Serbian: Орден белог орла с мачевима, romanized: Orden belog orla s mačevima) is the fifth highest state order of Serbia. The order is awarded by the decree of the President of the Republic on special occasions, typically at the ceremonies held on the Statehood Day. It is awarded for merits in the fields of defense and military merits.

== History ==
King Milan I established the Order of the White Eagle in 1883. In 1945, with the abolition of the monarchy, the order was in effect abolished. Since the end of Yugoslavia, the dynastic order continues to be awarded by Alexander, Crown Prince of Yugoslavia, as the senior representative of the Crown.

Order of the White Eagle was re-established in 2010 when the National Assembly adopted the amendments to the Law on Decorations of the Republic of Serbia. Since the order was re-introduced, the first person to receive it was General Ljubiša Diković, Chief of the General Staff of the Serbian Armed Forces.

== Ranks ==
Order of the White Eagle with Swords has three classes.

1st class	2nd class	3rd class

== Notable recipients ==
=== 1st class ===
- 2020 - Military Academy
- 2015 - Ljubiša Diković

=== 2nd class ===
- 2018 - Military Technical Institute
- 2014 - Serbian Air Force and Air Defence
- 2014 - Aleksandar Živković

=== 3rd class ===
- 2016 - Milomir Todorović

== See also ==
- Orders, decorations and medals of Serbia
- Order of the White Eagle
