= Order of the War Banner (Serbia and Montenegro) =

- Country: Serbia and Montenegro
- Status: Dissolved

Precedence
- Next (higher): Order of the Yugoslav Flag
- Next (lower): Order of Merits of FR Yugoslavia

The Order of the War Banner (Serbo-Croatian: Orden ratne zastave, Орден ратне заставе) was a military order of honor and the 7th highest state decoration of Serbia and Montenegro (also known as the Federal Republic of Yugoslavia).

In 1998, Federal Republic of Yugoslavia adopted new Law on Decorations that kept most of the decorations of the Socialist Yugoslavia, with some additions. Order of the War Banner was kept, but now had three classes. The inscription on the badge was slightly altered, so now it read "За слободу и независност отаџбине" (For the freedom and independence of the motherland).

Recipients included:

- Vladimir Lazarević (1st class)
- Guards Brigade (1st class)
- 72nd Brigade for Special Operations (1st class)

Ribbon bars (1998-2006)
Order of the War Banner, 1st class	Order of the War Banner, 2nd class	Order of the War Banner, 3rd class

== See also ==
- Orders, decorations, and medals of the Federal Republic of Yugoslavia
- Order of the War Banner
