= Order of Freedom (Yugoslavia) =

Highest military decoration of Yugoslavia

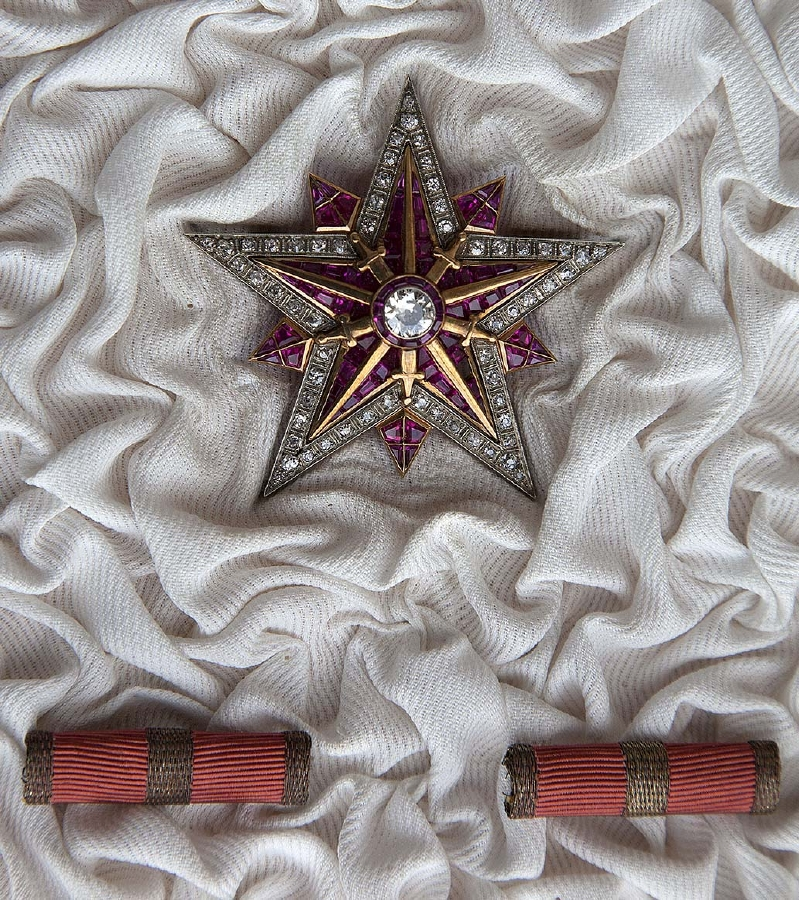
- Order of Freedom badge and ribbon bar
- Type: Military decoration with one degree
- Country: Yugoslavia
- Ribbon
- Eligibility: Military commanders
- Awarded for: Skillful leadership and outstanding courage

Statistics
- Last induction: 16 June 1999
- Total inductees: 7

Precedence
- Next (higher): Order of the People's Hero (1945–1955); Yugoslav Great Star (after 1955)
- Next (lower): Order of the Partisan Star (1945–1955); Order of the People's Hero (after 1955)

Order of Freedom (Serbo-Croatian: Orden slobode, Орден слободе; Slovene: Red svobode; Macedonian: Орден на слободата, Orden na slobodata) was the highest military decoration awarded in Yugoslavia, and the second highest Yugoslav state decoration after the Yugoslav Great Star. It was awarded to the commanders of large military units for skillful leadership and for the outstanding courage of the troops. It was awarded to both Yugoslavian and foreign military commanders, and was the most rarely awarded of all Yugoslavian orders, decorations, and medals, being awarded only 7 times before the breakup of Yugoslavia.

== History ==
The Order of Freedom was founded on 12 June 1945 and was awarded by the Presidency of the AVNOJ (later Presidency of the People's Assembly of Yugoslavia). The recipient could be nominated by the Federal Executive Council of Yugoslavia, the executive council of one of the Republics, Federal Secretary for Foreign Affairs or Federal Secretary for Defense.

== Recipients ==
The Order was awarded a total of 7 times. The recipients were:

- (Socialist Federal Republic of Yugoslavia) Josip Broz Tito — awarded on 29 November 1947
- (Socialist Federal Republic of Yugoslavia) Ivan Gošnjak — awarded on 22 December 1951
- (Socialist Federal Republic of Yugoslavia) Koča Popović — awarded on 22 December 1951
- (Soviet Union) Georgy Zhukov — awarded on 20 June 1956
- (Socialist Federal Republic of Yugoslavia) Peko Dapčević — awarded on 12 July 1973
- (Socialist Federal Republic of Yugoslavia) Kosta Nađ — awarded on 22 December 1973
- (Soviet Union) Leonid Brezhnev — awarded on 15 November 1976

== See also ==
- Orders, decorations, and medals of the Socialist Federal Republic of Yugoslavia
- Order of Freedom (Federal Republic of Yugoslavia)
- Order of Freedom of the Republic of Slovenia
- Order of Freedom (Bosnia and Herzegovina)
- Order of Freedom (Kosovo)
