= Sombor Gymnasium =

Veljko Petrović Gymnasium

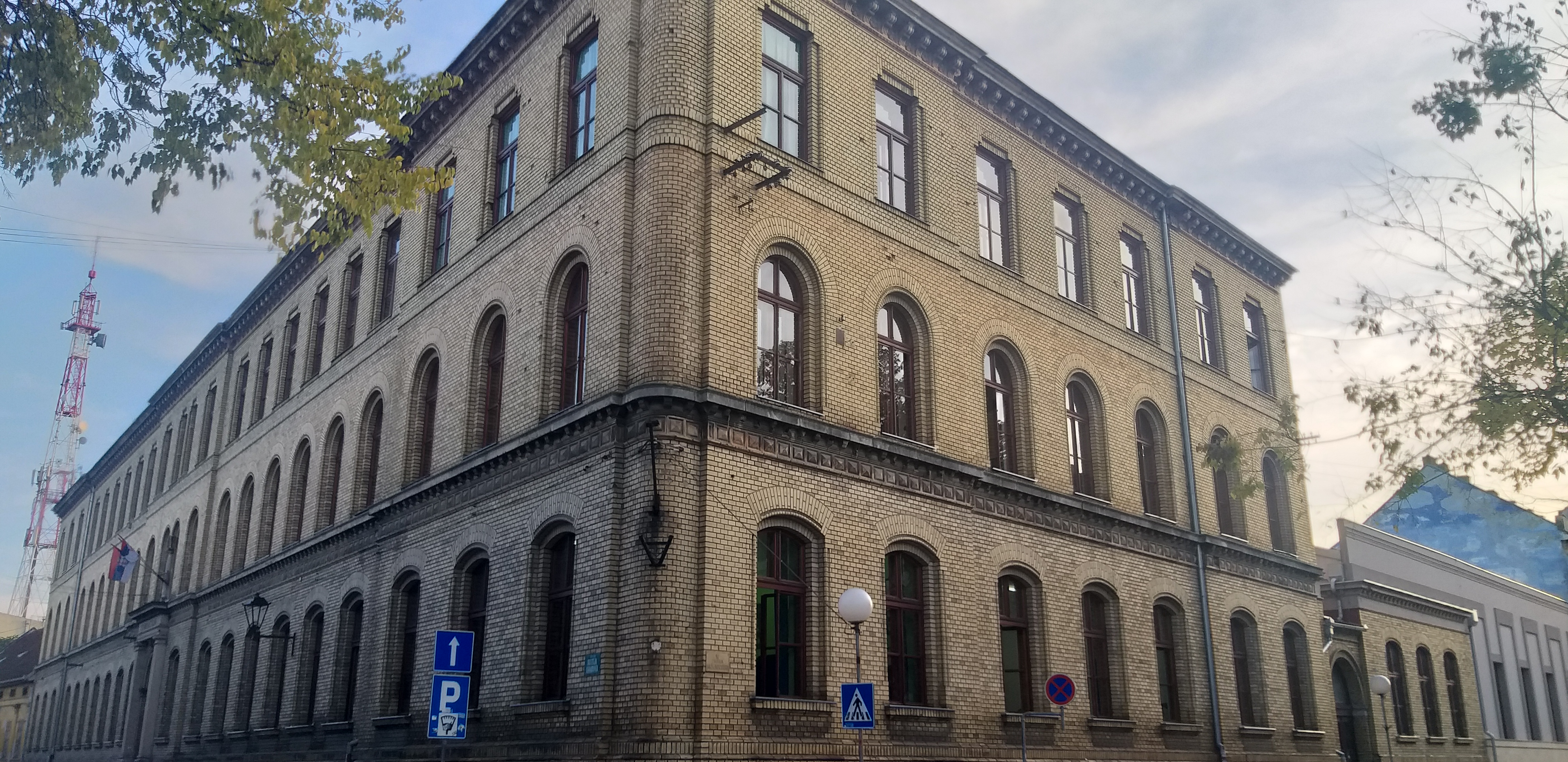

Location
- Sombor, Vojvodina; Serbia
- Coordinates: 45°46′18″N 19°06′50″E

Information
- Type: public school
- Established: 1872; 154 years ago
- Campus: Urban
- Website: www.gimnazijaso.edu.rs

The Veljko Petrović Gymnasium (Serbian: Гимназија Вељко Петровић, Gimnazija Veljko Petrović), colloquially known as the Sombor Gymnasium, is a public coeducational high school (gymnasium, similar to preparatory school) located in Sombor, city in Vojvodina, Serbia. In February 2023 the school received the Sretenje Order, the fourth highest state order of Serbia, for its contribution to the Republic and citizens of Serbia.

Alongside Veljko Petrović, notable alumni of the school include Ivan Radović, Milan Konjović, Gaja Alaga, Bogdan Maglich, Tihomir Novakov, Sima Ćirković, Iván Gutman, Irinej Bulović and others. In 2022 the 150 Years of Gymnasium in Sombor book by Dr. Attila Pfajfer, assistant professor at the Faculty of Philosophy at the University of Novi Sad, was published with support from the City of Sombor and the Provincial Secretariat for Education of Vojvodina.

== History ==
=== Establishment ===
The first educational institution at the site of gymnasium was the Latin Grammar School established in 1781. The school building used at that time was built at the site of an earlier Ottoman bath where in 1698 Martin Lipković received permission to build a brewery and a post office. The decision by Franciscan friar Fra Bona Mihaljević to close the Latin Grammar School caused dissatisfaction among parents motivating authorities to open the public school already at the beginning of the next school year. First ideas about the opening of gymnasium in the city appeared already in 1819 when Serb community in Sombor collected 20,000 forints for the new school but the town authorities failed to ensure the land for the new institution. In 1830 6-class gymnasium program was initiated in the town and from 1853 it provided German and Serbian language elementary gymnasium classes. Sombor's Roman Catholic elementary schools introduced four-year school curriculum in 1846 with Orthodox schools following with the same decision in 1855. In 1843 the town appointed a commission on the proposed new gymnasium but this decision was not followed by the establishment of the school. The Town of Sombor Gymnasium in Serbian and Hungarian language was established only in 1869 but it remained open only for 2 years. The current institution was finally established in 1872 as the State Gymnasium of Sombor.

=== Austro-Hungarian period until the World War I ===
At the beginning the school enrolled only four grades of students but with one additional higher grade introduced each subsequent school year until 1876/77 when it expanded to eight grades institution. In 1886 the school was moved to the current building inspired by North German architecture, where classes were now conducted in Hungarian exclusively all the way up until the end of World War I when Banat, Bačka and Baranja joined the newly created Kingdom of Serbs, Croats and Slovenes. On average, at that time the school had between 250 and 350 students in each class with about half of them from Sombor, and other half from the Bács-Bodrog County or neighbouring areas.

=== Kingdom of Yugoslavia ===
Between 1918 and 1923 classes were again conducted both in Serbian and Hungarian while from 1923 classes in Hungarian were discontinued.

=== SFR Yugoslavia ===
In the immediate aftermath of the liberation of Sombor in October 1944 and until the end of April 1945, the gymnasium building housed a military hospital for the Soviet Red Army and the Yugoslav Partisan Army. In 1968 the school was named after its alumni Veljko Petrović.
