= Order of Merits in Defense and Security =

Republic of Serbia order

Order of Merits in Defense and Security Орден заслуга за одбрану и безбедност

Awarded by Republic of Serbia
- Type: State order
- Awarded for: Above-average, exemplary and honorable performance of duties and tasks in the fields of defense and security.
- Status: Active

Statistics
- First induction: 2009

Precedence
- Next (higher): Order of the White Eagle with Swords
- Next (lower): None
- 1st class; 2nd class; 3rd class; Ribbon bars of the order

Order of Merits in Defense and Security (Serbian: Орден заслуга за одбрану и безбедност, romanized: Orden zasluga za odbranu i bezbednost) is the sixth highest state order of Serbia. The order is awarded by the decree of the President of the Republic on special occasions, typically at the ceremonies held on the Statehood Day. It is awarded for above-average, exemplary and honorable performance of duties and tasks in the fields of defense and security.

== Ranks ==
Order of Merits in Defense and Security has three classes.

1st class	2nd class	3rd class

== See also ==
- Orders, decorations and medals of Serbia
