= Order of Labour =

Yugoslav civil decoration

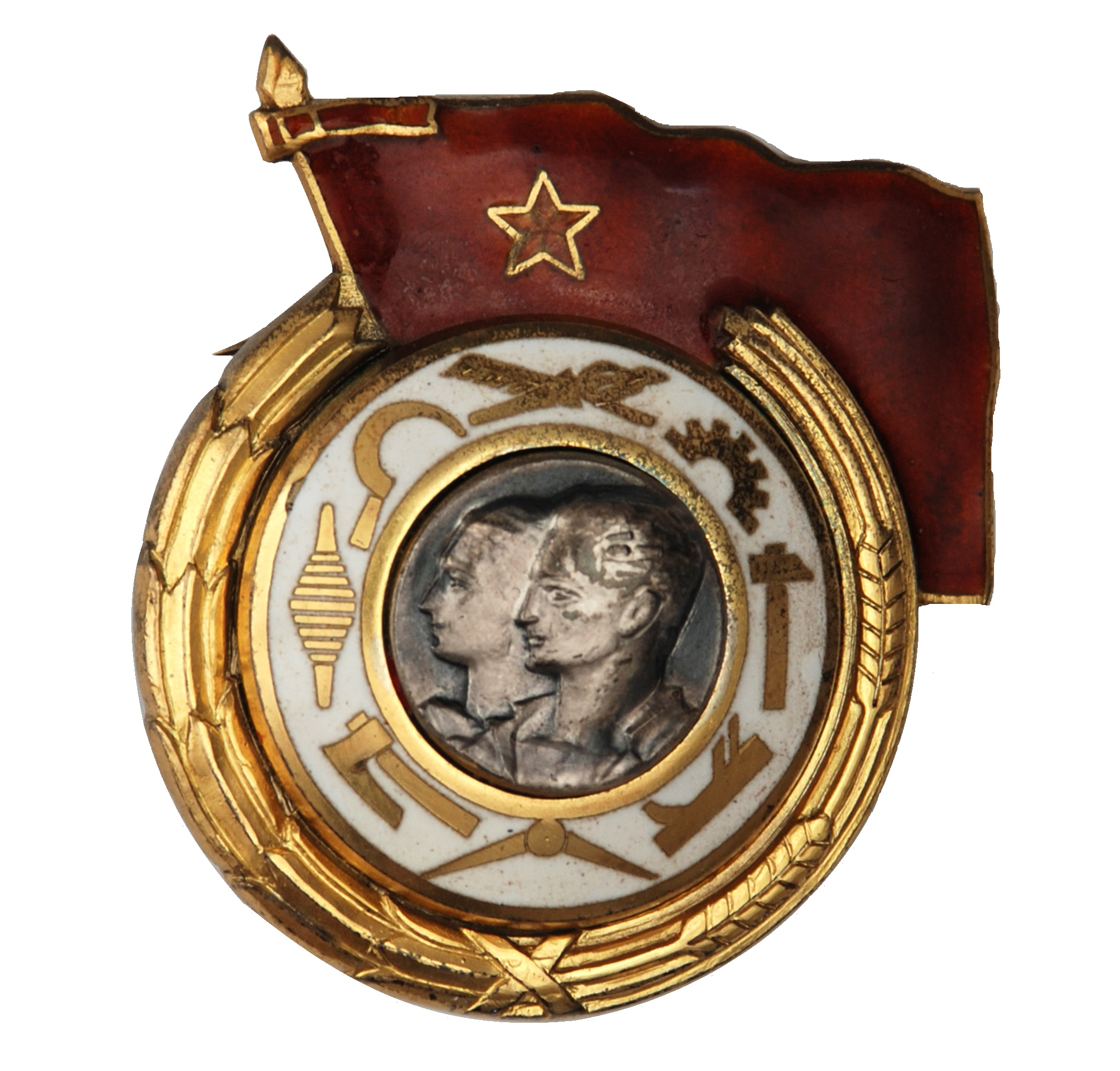
- Order of Labour with the Red Flag (1st class)
- Type: Three classes (1945-1992) Single class (1998-2006)
- Country: Yugoslavia; FR Yugoslavia
- Eligibility: Yugoslav civilian and military personnel
- Status: No longer awarded
- Established: 1 May 1945
- First award: July 1945
- Final award: 1992

Highlights
- Total recipients: 7,096 (Class I); 36,000 (Class II); 182,910 (Class III)
- Ribbon bar of the 1st class

Precedence
- Next (higher): Order of Bravery (1945-1955); Order of Merits for the People (1955-1960); Order of the Republic (1960-1961); Order of the People's Army (1961-1992); Order of Tesla (1998-2006)
- Next (lower): Lowest (1945-1955); Order of the People's Army (1950-1961); Order of Military Merits (1961-1992); Order of Bravery (1998-2006)
- Related: Medal of Labour

The Order of Labour (Serbo-Croatian: Orden rada, Орден рада, Slovene: Red dela, Macedonian: Орден на трудот) was a Yugoslav civil decoration awarded to both civilians and military personnel for outstanding work performance. It was established in May 1945, and had three classes. In 1961, the classes were renamed: Order of Labour with Red Banner (formerly 1st class), Order of Labour with Golden Wreath (formerly 2nd class) and Order of Labour with Silver Wreath (formerly 3rd class).

In 1998, the Federal Republic of Yugoslavia adopted a new Law on Decorations that kept most of the decorations of the Socialist Yugoslavia, with some additions. The Order of Labour was retained, but now had only a single class.

== Gallery ==
1945-1992

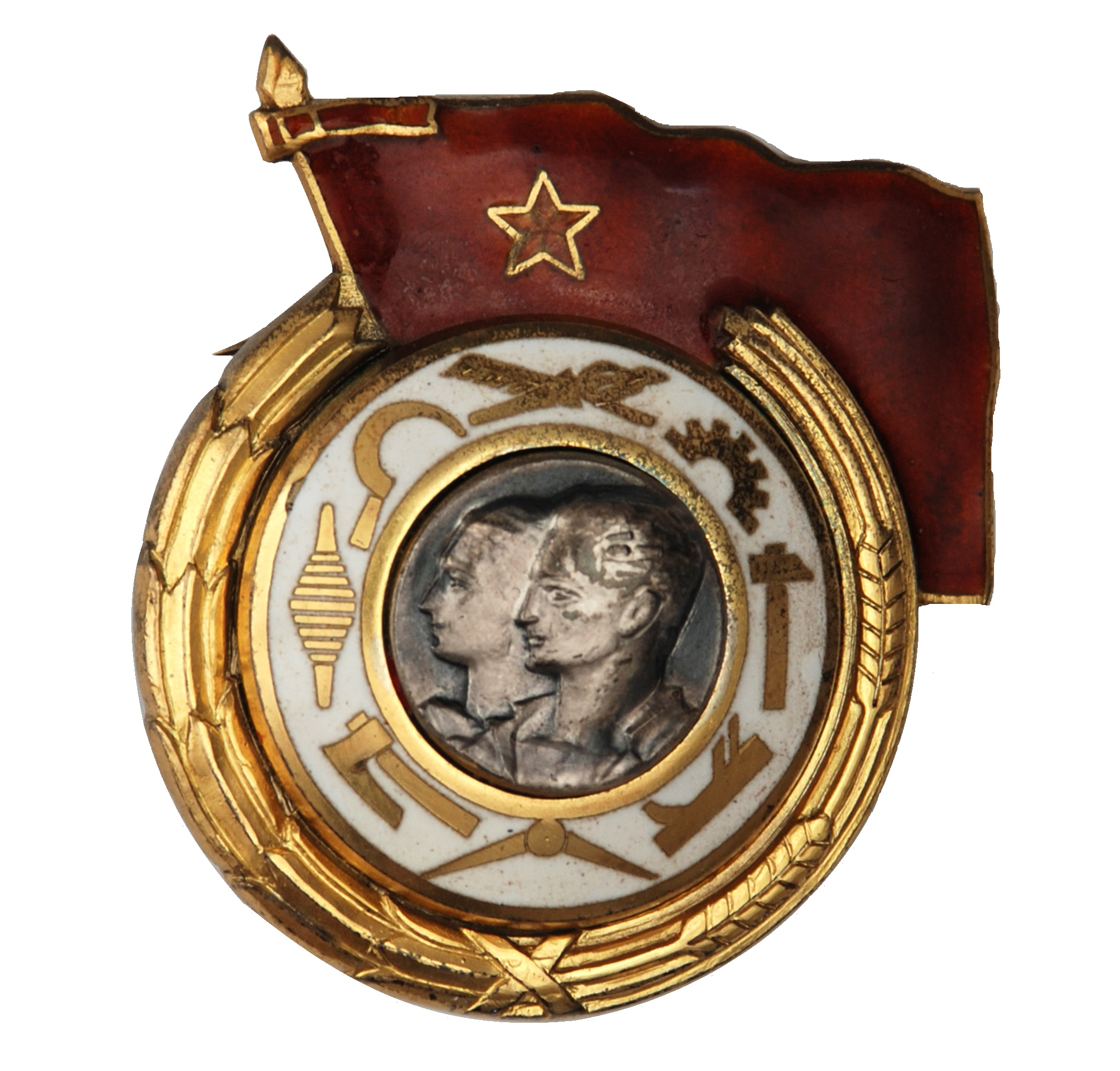
First Class (with red banner)

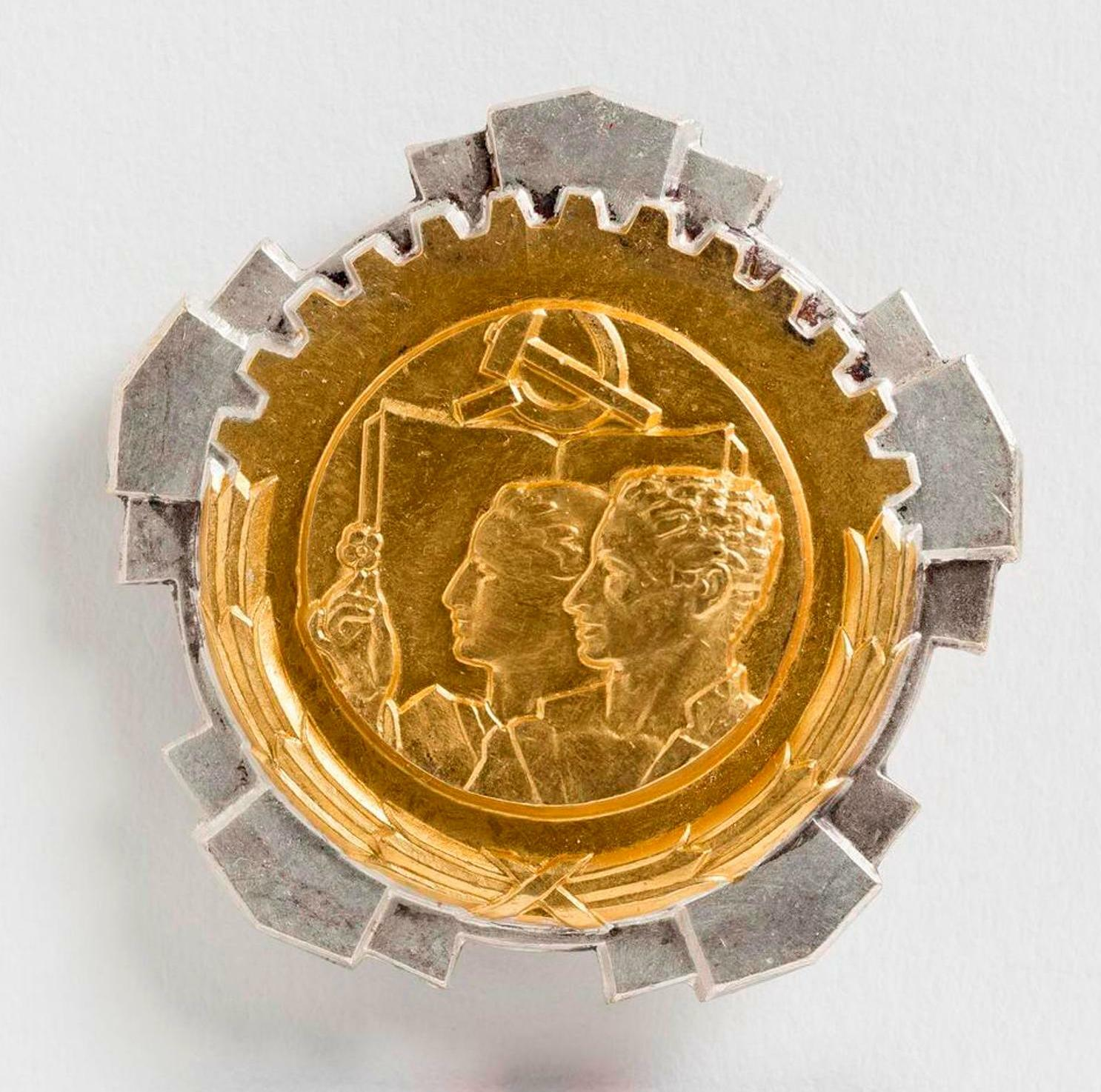
Second Class (with golden wreath)

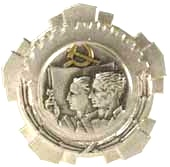
Third Class (with silver wreath)

Ribbons

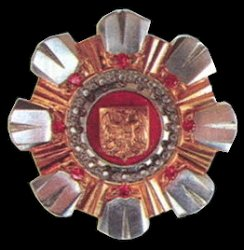
1992-2006

Ribbon
