= Sretenje Order =

Republic of Serbia order

Sretenje Order Сретењски орден

Awarded by Republic of Serbia
- Type: State order
- Eligibility: Serbian and foreign citizens and institutions
- Awarded for: Special merits for Serbia and its citizens in the fields of public, economic, cultural, educational, sports and humanitarian activities.
- Status: Active

Statistics
- First induction: 2009

Precedence
- Next (higher): Order of Karađorđe's Star
- Next (lower): Order of the White Eagle with Swords
- 1st class; 2nd class; 3rd class; Ribbon bars of the order

Sretenje Order (Serbian: Сретењски орден, romanized: Sretenjski orden) is the fourth highest state order of Serbia. The order is awarded by the decree of the President of the Republic on special occasions, typically at the ceremonies held on Statehood Day. It is awarded for merits in the fields of public, economic, cultural, educational, sports and humanitarian activities. It can be awarded to individuals and institutions.

== Ranks ==
Sretenje Order has three classes.

1st class	2nd class	3rd class

== Notable recipients ==
=== 1st class ===
- 2013 - (United Kingdom) Harold Pinter (posthumously)
- 2013 - (France) Pierre Marie Gallois (posthumously)
- 2015 - (Serbia) Smilja Avramov
- 2016 - (Greece) Corfu municipality
- 2017 - (Serbia) Serbian Academy of Sciences and Arts
- 2017 - (Serbia) Matica srpska
- 2018 - (Serbia) National Theatre in Belgrade
- 2019 - National Museum of Serbia
- 2020 - (Serbia) Dušan Kovačević
- 2020 - (Serbia) Clerical High School of Saint Arsenije
- 2020 - (Serbia) University of Belgrade Faculty of Medicine
- 2021 - (Serbia) Emir Kusturica
- 2021 - (Russia) Aleksandr Rukavishnikov
- 2022 - (Serbia) Ištvan Pastor
- 2022 - (Serbia) Prohor Pčinjski Monastery
- 2022 - (Slovenia) Zoran Janković
- 2022 - (Serbia) Gallery of Matica Srpska
- 2022 - (Serbia) Serbian National Theatre
- 2022 - (Serbia) Dušan Čkrebić
- 2022 - (Serbia) National Theatre in Niš
- 2022 - (Serbia) Serbian Literary Guild
- 2023 - (Serbia) Vladimir Kanjuh
- 2023 - (Serbia) Belgrade Philharmonic Orchestra
- 2023 - (Serbia) Milovan Bojić
- 2024 - (Serbia) Ninoslav Radovanović
- 2024 - (Bosnia and Herzegovina) Rajko Kuzmanović
- 2024 - (Serbia) Belgrade City Museum
- 2024 - (Serbia) Politika
- 2024 - (Serbia) Radio Belgrade
- 2024 - Basketball Federation of Serbia
- 2024 - (Serbia) Večernje novosti
- 2025 - (Serbia) Roman Catholic Diocese of Subotica
- 2025 - (Mount Athos) Hilandar Monastery
- 2025 - (Serbia) Sima Avramović
- 2025 - (Serbia) National Bank of Serbia
- 2025 - (Serbia) Pošta Srbije
- 2025 - (Serbia) Volleyball Federation of Serbia
- 2026 - (Serbia) Irinej Bulović

=== 2nd class ===
- 2012 - (Serbia) Petnica Science Center
- 2012 - (United States) Ramsey Clark
- 2013 - National Library of Serbia
- 2013 - (Russia) Alexander Babakov
- 2014 - Archive of Serbia
- 2014 - (Serbia) Milorad Ekmečić
- 2015 - (United States) Noam Chomsky
- 2015 - (Azerbaijan) Mehriban Aliyeva
- 2016 - (Serbia) Mihajlo Pupin Institute
- 2016 - (Serbia) Museum of Natural History, Belgrade
- 2016 - (Serbia) Puriša Đorđević
- 2017 - Red Cross of Serbia
- 2017 - (France) City of Jausiers
- 2017 - (Serbia) Ilija M. Kolarac Endowment
- 2018 - (Serbia) Museum of Vojvodina
- 2018 - (Serbia) Military Museum, Belgrade
- 2019 - (Serbia) Zemun Gymnasium
- 2019 - (Serbia) Zrenjanin Theatre
- 2021 - (Serbia) Aleksandar Berček
- 2021 - (Serbia) Pero Zubac
- 2022 - (Serbia) Poštanska štedionica
- 2022 - (Serbia) Borba
- 2022 - (Serbia) Zoran Terzić
- 2023 - (Serbia) Vukov sabor
- 2023 - (Serbia) Radmila Živković
- 2024 - (Serbia) Arsenije Glavčić
- 2024 - (Serbia) Vinča Nuclear Institute
- 2025 - (Serbia) Novo Hopovo Monastery

=== 3rd class ===
- 2012 - (Serbia) Jovan Ćirilov
- 2012 - (Serbia) Miodrag Stojković
- 2012 - (Serbia) Milunka Lazarević
- 2013 - (Serbia) Veran Matić
- 2013 - Historical Museum of Serbia
- 2014 - (Serbia) Zastava Arms
- 2014 - (Serbia) Veselin Đuretić
- 2014 - (Serbia) Petar Omčikus
- 2015 - (Serbia) Milan Raspopović
- 2015 - (Serbia) Ivan Klajn
- 2015 - (Serbia) Đorđe Marjanović
- 2016 - (Serbia) Belgrade Mathematical Gymnasium
- 2016 - (Serbia) Mokranjac Music School
- 2016 - (Serbia) Belgrade City Library
- 2017 - (Serbia) Atelje 212
- 2017 - (Serbia) Belgrade International Theatre Festival
- 2017 - (Serbia) Belgrade Drama Theatre
- 2019 - (Serbia) Vladeta Jerotić (posthumously)
- 2019 - (Serbia) Dobrica Erić (posthumously)
- 2020 - (Serbia) Politikin zabavnik
- 2020 - (Serbia) Historical Archive of Belgrade
- 2022 - (Serbia) Vladimir Obradović
- 2022 - (Serbia) Institute of History Belgrade
- 2022 - (Serbia) University of Belgrade Faculty of Economics
- 2022 - (Serbia) VK Partizan
- 2023 - (Serbia) Svetlana Stević Vukosavljević
- 2023 - (Serbia) Sombor Gymnasium
- 2024 - (Serbia) Tuman Monastery
- 2024 - (Serbia) Kolibri Choir
- 2025 - (Russia) Sretensky Monastery

== See also ==
- Orders, decorations and medals of Serbia
