= Order of the War Banner =

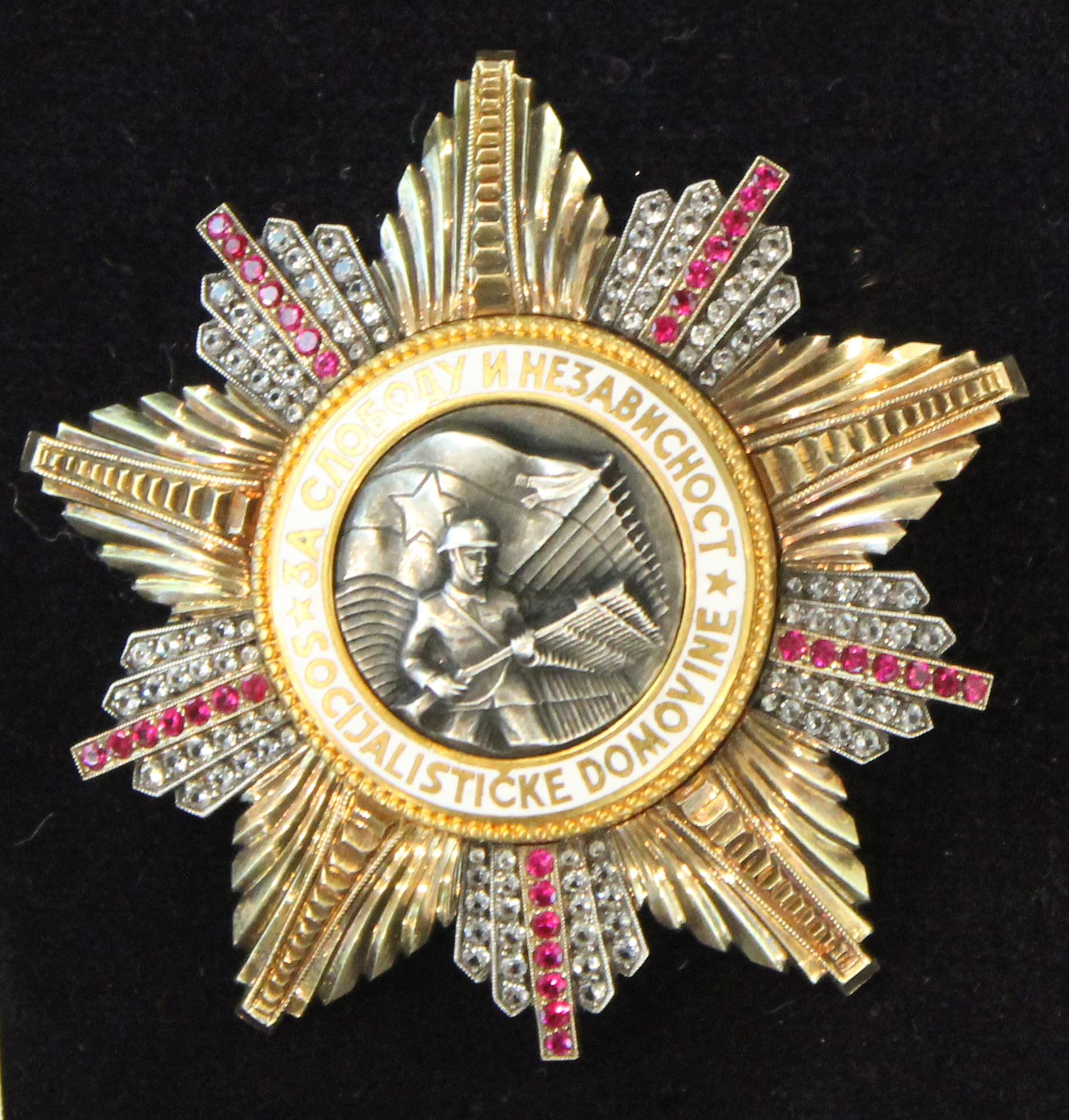
- "За слободу и независност ★ socijalističke domovine" (lit. 'For the freedom and independence of the socialist homeland')
- Type: Order
- Awarded for: Personal courage, self-sacrifice, involvement in commanding and distinct role in creation, fixing and training of Armed Forces of SFRY during the war
- Country: Yugoslavia
- Eligibility: Military commanders
- Status: Dissolved
- Established: 29 December 1951
- First award: 1954

Highlights
- Total: 209

Precedence
- Next (higher): Order of the People's Liberation
- Next (lower): Order of the Yugoslav Flag

The Order of the War Banner (Serbo-Croatian: Orden ratne zastave / Орден ратне заставе, Macedonian: Орден на военото знаме, Slovene: Red vojne zastave) was a military order of honor and the sixth highest state decoration of the Socialist Federal Republic of Yugoslavia (SFRY). It was awarded to military commanders who show personal courage or self-sacrifice during the war.

== History ==
The Order of the War Banner It was founded by the Presidency of People's Assembly on 29 December 1951, with one class. After that, a public competition for the design of the insignia was announced. The results of the competition were published in Politika on 27 August 1953, and the winner was Grigorij Samojlov, an architect from Belgrade. From its establishment in 1951 until 1984, there were 209 recipients of the order; 204 were Yugoslav citizens, and the remaining five were Soviet generals (who were all awarded in 1964).

Ribbon bar (1951-1992)
Order of the War Banner (single class)

== Recipients ==
- Petar Gračanin

== See also ==
- Orders, decorations, and medals of the Socialist Federal Republic of Yugoslavia
- Order of the War Banner (Federal Republic of Yugoslavia)
