= Orders, decorations, and medals of the Socialist Federal Republic of Yugoslavia =

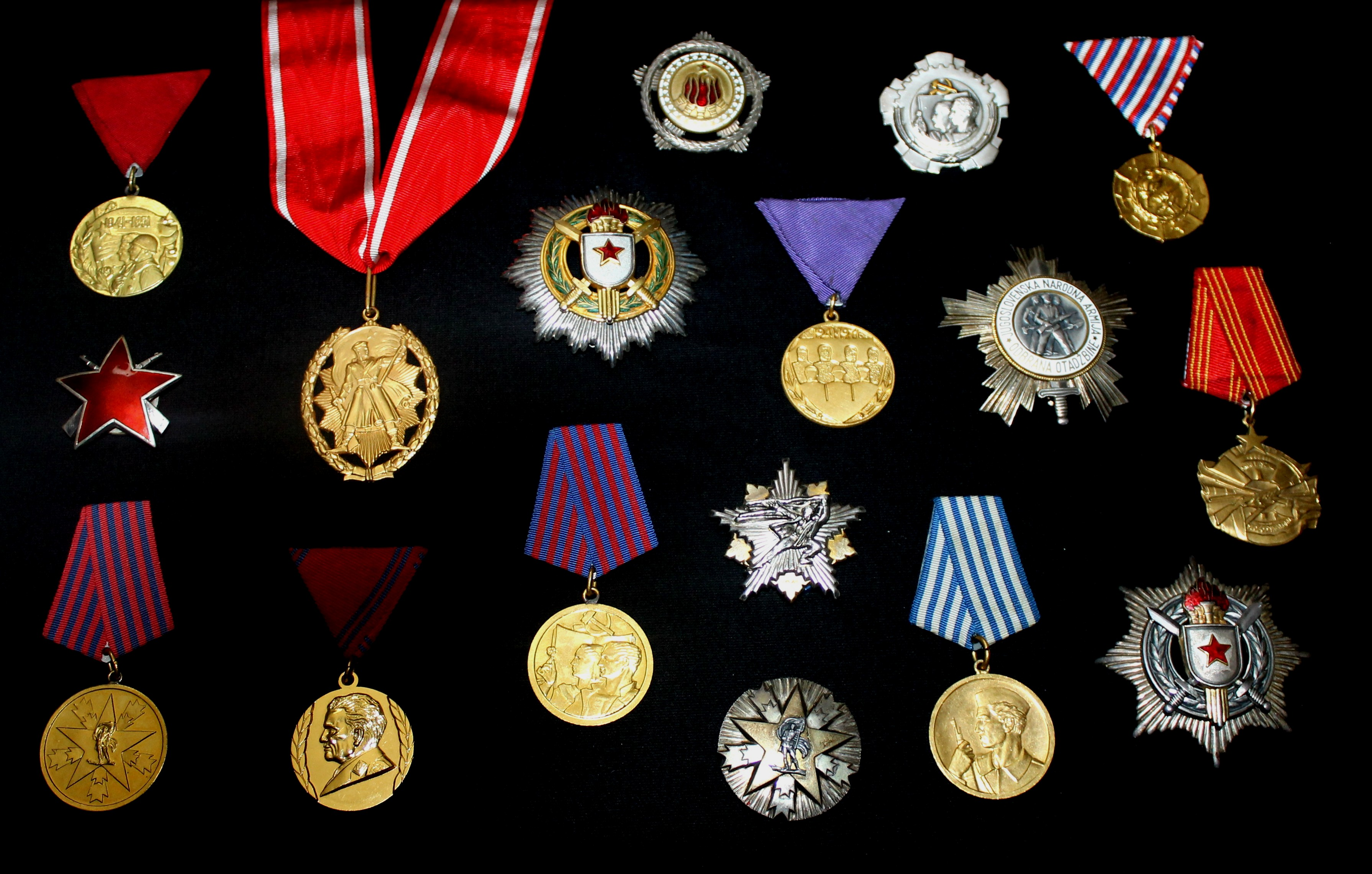
Decorations of the SFRY: Order of Brotherhood and Unity, Order of the People's Hero, Order of Military Merit, Medal of Labor, Medal of Bravery and Memorial Medal of the Partisans of 1941.

Orders, decorations, and medals of the Socialist Federal Republic of Yugoslavia were created during the Second World War and used throughout the existence of the Socialist Federal Republic of Yugoslavia (called Federal People's Republic of Yugoslavia until 1963). The first decorations were created by AVNOJ on August 15, 1943 and included the Order of the People's Hero, Order of the People's Liberation, Order of the Partisan Star, Order of the Brotherhood and Unity, Order for Bravery and Medal for Bravery. By 1960 the total number of decorations increased to 42 and consisted of 35 orders, 6 medals and 1 commemorative medal. The designers of the Yugoslav orders and medals were Antun Augustinčić and Đorđe Andrejević Kun.

The Law on Decorations of 1945 introduced two new orders (Order of Freedom, Order of Merits for the People) and one new medal (Medal for Merits for the People) and assigned the order of precedence of all orders and medals. The Law was amended in 1946, when the Commemorative medal of Partisans of 1941 was removed and no longer considered a decoration. New decorations were introduced in 1947 (Order of the Yugoslav Flag), 1948 (Order of the Hero of Socialist Labour), 1951 (Order of the War Banner, Order of the People's Army, Order of Military Merits, Medal for Military Merits, Medal for Military Virtues), 1954 (Order of the Yugoslav Star), 1955 (Medal for Merits), and 1960 (Order of the Republic). In 1961, the Law was amended again, so that names of many lower class orders was changed, and the order of precedence was slightly changed. In 1973, new Law on Decorations was adopted. It kept all the previous decorations, but the order of precedence was abolished.

Before 1955, no distinction was made between the civil and military decorations. The Law on Decorations of 1955 made this distinction for the first time and it was kept until the Law of 1973 when this distinction was abolished. Between 1955 and 1973, the orders of Freedom, People's Hero, War Banner, Partisan Star, People's Army, Military Merits, and Bravery, and the medals for Bravery, Military Merits and Military Virtues were considered military decorations, while all others were considered civil decorations.

The original decorations are kept at the World Intellectual Property Organization. The Yugoslav government requested that the decorations be given the status of "official sign" as opposed to other countries and states where the status of official control and warranty is reserved only for the national seal. With the dissolution of Yugoslavia the decorations stopped being awarded but continue to be protected by Article 6 of the Paris Convention for the Protection of Industrial Property.

In 1998, the Federal Republic of Yugoslavia (also known as Serbia and Montenegro) adopted new Law on Decorations that kept most of the decorations of the Socialist Yugoslavia, with some additions.

== Orders ==
	Order	Ribbon bar	Date of establishment	Rank overall (1945)	Rank overall (1955)	Rank overall (1960)	Rank overall (1961)	Number awarded (until the end of 1985)
1.	Order of the Yugoslav Star							
1.	Order of the Yugoslav Great Star		1 February 1954	—	1	1	1	127
1.	Order of the Yugoslav Star with Sash (Before 1961: Order of the Yugoslav Star 1st class)		1 February 1954	—	6	6	6	159
1.	Order of the Yugoslav Star with Golden Wreath (Before 1961: Order of the Yugoslav Star 2nd class)		1 February 1954	—	15	16	14	320
1.	Order of the Yugoslav Star on Cravat (Before 1961: Order of the Yugoslav Star 3rd class)		1 February 1954	—	24	26	24	322
2.	Order of Freedom		9 June 1945	2	2	2	2	7
3.	Order of the People's Hero		15 August 1943	1	3	3	3	1,322
4.	Order of the Hero of Socialist Labour		1 December 1948	—	4	4	4	121
5.	Order of the People's Liberation		15 August 1943	4	5	5	5	335
6.	Order of the War Banner		29 December 1951	—	7	7	7	209
7.	Order of the Yugoslav Flag							
7.	Order of the Yugoslav Flag with Sash (Before 1961: Order of the Yugoslav Flag, 1st class)		26 November 1947	—	8	8	8	1,321
7.	Order of the Yugoslav Flag with Golden Wreath (Before 1961: Order of the Yugoslav Flag, 2nd class)		26 November 1947	—	16	17	19	1,433
7.	Order of the Yugoslav Flag with Golden Star on Cravat (Before 1961: Order of the Yugoslav Flag, 3rd class)		26 November 1947	—	25	27	28	1,300
7.	Order of the Yugoslav Flag with Golden Star (Before 1961: Order of the Yugoslav Flag, 4th class)		26 November 1947	—	30	33	32	955
7.	Order of the Yugoslav Flag with Silver Star (Before 1961: Order of the Yugoslav Flag, 5th class)		26 November 1947	—	32	35	35	769
8.	Order of the Partisan Star							
8.	Order of the Partisan Star with Golden Wreath (Before 1961: Order of the Partisan Star, 1st class)		15 August 1943	3	9	9	9	627
8.	Order of the Partisan Star with Silver Wreath (Before 1961: Order of the Partisan Star, 2nd class)		15 August 1943	7	17	18	17	1,531
8.	Order of Partisan Star with Rifles (Before 1961: Order of the Partisan Star, 3rd class)		15 August 1943	10	26	28	29	10,384
9.	Order of the Republic							
9.	Order of the Republic with Golden Wreath (Before 1961: Order of the Republic, 1st class)		2 July 1960	—	—	13	10	1,150
9.	Order of the Republic with Silver Wreath (Before 1961: Order of the Republic, 2nd class)		2 July 1960	—	—	22	18	6,310
9.	Order of the Republic with Bronze Wreath (Before 1961: Order of the Republic, 3rd class)		2 July 1960	—	—	31	27	121,088
10.	Order of Merits for the People							
10.	Order of Merits for the People with Golden Star (Before 1961: Order of Merits for the People, 1st class)		9 June 1945	5	10	10	11	4,688
10.	Order of Merits for the People with Silver Rays (Before 1961: Order of Merits for the People, 2nd class)		9 June 1945	8	18	19	20	39,534
10.	Order of Merits for the People with Silver Star (Before 1961: Order of Merits for the People, 3rd class)		9 June 1945	13	27	29	30	282,864
11.	Order of Brotherhood and Unity							
11.	Order of Brotherhood and Unity with Golden Wreath (1943-1945: Order of Brotherhood and Unity; 1945-1961: Order of Brotherhood and Unity, 1st class)		15 August 1943	6	13	11	12	3,870
11.	Order of Brotherhood and Unity with Silver Wreath (Before 1961: Order of Brotherhood and Unity, 2nd class)		9 June 1945	9	21	20	21	55,675
12.	Order of the People's Army							
12.	Order of the People's Army with Laurer Wreath (Before 1961: Order of the People's Army, 1st class)		29 December 1951	—	12	12	13	536
12.	Order of the People's Army with Golden Star (Before 1961: Order of the People's Army, 2nd class)		29 December 1951	—	20	21	22	9,137
12.	Order of the People's Army with Silver Star (Before 1961: Order of the People's Army, 3rd class)		29 December 1951	—	29	30	31	45,384
13.	Order of Labour							
13.	Order of Labor with Red Banner (Before 1961: Order of Labor, 1st class)		1 May 1945	12	11	14	15	7,096
13.	Order of Labour with Golden Wreath (Before 1961: Order of Labor, 2nd class)		1 May 1945	14	19	23	25	36,000
13.	Order of Labour with Silver Wreath (Before 1961: Order of Labor, 3rd class)		1 May 1945	15	28	32	33	182,910
14.	Order of Military Merits							
14.	Order of Military Merits with Great Star (Before 1961: Order of Military Merits, 1st class)		29 December 1951	—	14	15	16	2,609
14.	Order of Military Merits with Golden Swords (Before 1961: Order of Military Merits, 2nd class)		29 December 1951	—	22	24	26	24,141
14.	Order of Military Merits with Silver Swords (Before 1961: Order of Military Merits, 3rd class)		29 December 1951	—	31	34	34	94,684
15.	Order of Bravery		15 August 1943	11	23	25	23	more than 120,000

== Medals ==
Rank	Medal	Ribbon bar	Date of establishment	Number awarded (until the end of 1985)
1	Medal for Bravery		15 August 1943	205,590
2	Medal for Merits for the People		9 June 1945	430,666
3	Medal of Labour		1 May 1945	133,233
4	Medal for Military Merits		29 December 1951	87,699
5	Medal for Military Virtues		29 December 1951	115,589
6	Medal for Merits		14 November 1955	845

=== Commemorative medal ===
Commemorative medal	Ribbon bar	Date of establishment	Number awarded
Commemorative Medal of the Partisans of 1941		14 September 1944	27,629

Instituted on 14 September 1944 for award to those actively involved in partisan or political units between 1941 and the end of WW2. At first, the Commemorative medal of the partisans of 1941 was considered to be the lowest of rank among the orders, but later lost that status to be considered outside of the before mentioned group and listed below medals.

=== Other medals ===
Medal	Ribbon bar	Date of establishment	Number awarded
"Death to fascism, freedom to the people" Medal		1965	7,960
"10 Years of Yugoslav Army" Medal		1951	
"20 Years of Yugoslav People's Army" Medal		1961	
"30 Years of Yugoslav People's Army" Medal		1971	
"30 Years of Victory over Fascism" Medal		1975	
"40 Years of Yugoslav People's Army" Medal		1981	
"50 Years of Yugoslav People's Army" Medal		1991	
Distinguished Marksman Medal		1953	
Medal for the participants of President Tito's Visit to India and Burma of 1954–1955		1955	1,200
Medals of the Association of Yugoslav Fighters in the International Brigades in Spain (two medals awarded together)		1956	250 each

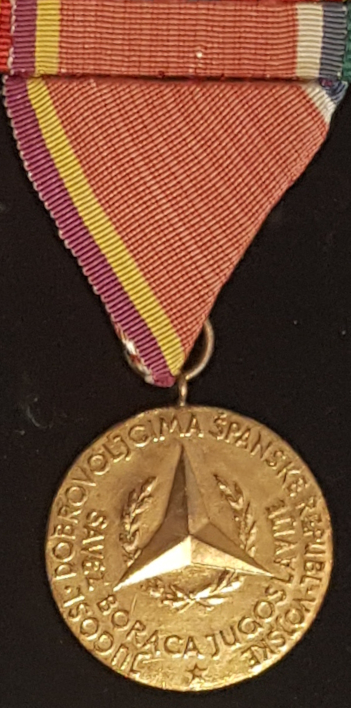
Medal of Yugoslav Fighters in the International Brigades in Spain, 1956.

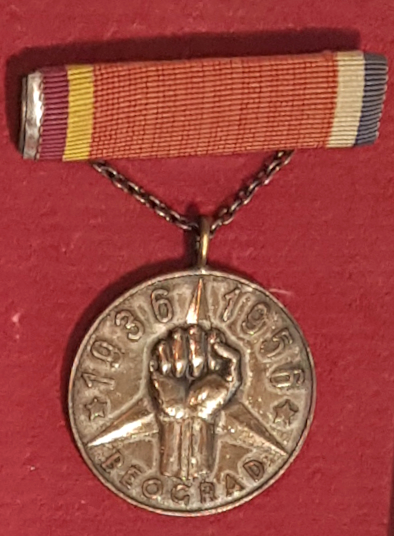
Medal of Yugoslav Fighters in the International Brigades in Spain, 1956.

== See also ==
- Orders, decorations, and medals of the Kingdom of Yugoslavia
- Orders and medals of Federal Republic of Yugoslavia
- Orders, decorations, and medals of Bosnia and Herzegovina
- Orders, decorations, and medals of Croatia
- Orders, decorations, and medals of Kosovo
- Orders, decorations, and medals of Montenegro
- Orders, decorations, and medals of North Macedonia
- Orders, decorations, and medals of Serbia
- Orders, decorations, and medals of Slovenia
- Socialist orders of merit
