= Đurkovići =

- Village
- Location within Montenegro
- Coordinates: 42°30′24″N 19°17′13″E
- Country: Montenegro
- Municipality: Podgorica

Population (2011)
  - Total: 91
- Time zone: UTC+1 (CET)
  - Summer (DST): UTC+2 (CEST)

Đurkovići (Montenegrin Cyrillic: Ђурковићи) is a village in the municipality of Podgorica, Montenegro.

The village is within the territorial boundaries of the Piperi tribe.

== Demographics ==
According to the 2011 census, its population was 91.

Ethnicity in 2011
Ethnicity	Number	Percentage
Montenegrins	52	57.1%
Serbs	39	42.9%
Total	91	100%
