= Order of Military Merit (Yugoslavia) =

Order of Military Merits
- Type: Order of merit with 3 degrees
- Awarded for: Outstanding achievements in national defense
- Country: Yugoslavia
- Presented by: Presidium of the National Assembly of Yugoslavia
- Eligibility: Yugoslav civilian and military personnel
- Status: Dissolved
- Established: 29 December 1951
- First award: 1951
- Final award: 1985

Highlights
- Total: 2,609 (Class I); 24,141 (Class II); 94,684 (Class III)

Precedence
- Next (higher): Order of Brotherhood and Unity (1945-1955); Order of Labour (after 1955)
- Next (lower): Order of Bravery
- Related: Medal for Military Merits

Order of Military Merits (Serbo-Croatian: Orden za vojne zasluge/Орден за војне заслуге, Slovene: Red za vojaške zasluge, Macedonian: Орден на Воени заслуги) was a state decoration awarded in Yugoslavia, divided into three classes. It was awarded to commanders of units and civilians serving in the Yugoslav People's Army, as well as individuals in trade unions or other organizations with outstanding contributions and accomplishment of tasks of special immediate importance for national defense.

== History ==
The order was established by the Presidium of the National Assembly of Yugoslavia on 29 December 1951 together with the Medal for Military Merits and awarded until the breakup of Yugoslavia in 1992. The number of times it was awarded has last been documented on 31 December 1985. The three classes of the order ranked as following in their importance, per the Law on Decorations of the FPR Yugoslavia from 1 March 1961:

- Order of Military Merits with Great Star – Class I, 16th in order of importance, awarded 2,609 times
- Order of Military Merits with Golden Swords – Class II, 26th in order of importance, awarded 24,141 times
- Order of Military Merits with Silver Swords – Class III, 34th in order of importance, awarded 94,684 times

After the breakup of SFR Yugoslavia, the new union of Serbia and Montenegro, formally Federal Republic of Yugoslavia, established an equivalent Order of Merit in the Field of Defense and Security (Serbo-Croatian: Орден за заслуге у области одбране и безбедности, Orden za zasluge u oblasti odbrane i bezbednosti) on 4 December 1998. It looked the same, but the red star was replaced with the Coat of arms of Serbia and Montenegro and torches behind the shield were removed.

== Gallery ==
Order of Military Merits with Great Star (Class I)	Order of Military Merits with Golden Swords (Class II)	Order of Military Merits with Silver Swords (Class III)
Ribbons

== Literature ==
- Vojna enciklopedija [Military Encyclopedia]. Vol. VI. Belgrade: Editorial office of the Military Encyclopedia. 1973. OCLC 180448376.
- General Encyclopedia of the Yugoslav Lexicographical Institute. Vol. VI. Belgrade: Yugoslav Lexicographical Institute. 1980. ISBN 978-86-7053-012-6. OCLC 31939890.
- Vojni leksikon [Military Lexicon]. Belgrade: Vojno izdavački zavod. 1981. OCLC 877809478.
- Sjaj ordena — Odlikovanja Savezne Republike Jugoslavije [Shine of the Orders — Decorations of the Federal Republic of Yugoslavia]. Belgrade: Vojni informator. 2001.
- Katalog izložbe: Odlikovanja iz legata Istorijskog arhiva Beograda [Catalog of the exhibition: Decorations from the legacy of the Historical Archive of Belgrade] (PDF). Belgrade: Historical Archive of Belgrade. 2015.
- Prister, Boris (2003). "Prve medalje za vojne zasluge" [The First Medals for Military Merit]. Numizmatičke vijesti (56). Zagreb: Croatian Numismatic Society: 240–244. COBISS 103662599.
