= Orders, decorations, and medals of the Kingdom of Yugoslavia =

The orders, decorations, and medals of the Kingdom of Yugoslavia were inherited from the Kingdom of Serbia and also established during the Kingdom of Yugoslavia period from 1918 to 1945.

== Orders ==
No.	Order	Depiction	Ribbon	Date of establishment
-	Order of Saint Prince Lazarus	Royal order only	None, chain only	1889
1.	Order of the Karađorđe's Star	Civil and military order		1904
	Order of the Karađorđe's Star with swords	Civil and military order		1912
2.	Order of the White Eagle	Civil and military order		1883
2.	Order of the White Eagle with swords	Civil and military order		1915
3.	Order of the Yugoslav Crown	Civil order		1930
4.	Order of St. Sava	Civil order		1883

== See also ==
- Orders, decorations, and medals of the Socialist Federal Republic of Yugoslavia
