= Order of Yugoslavia =

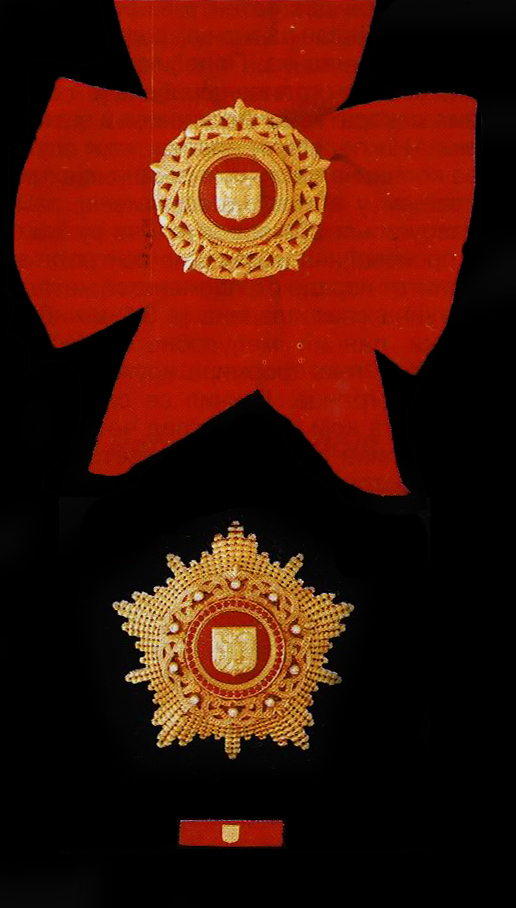
- Insignia of the order (without grand collar)

Awarded by President of Serbia and Montenegro
- Type: National order of merit
- Established: 3 December 1998
- Country: Serbia and Montenegro
- Ribbon
- Eligibility: heads of states or governments
- Status: Defunct
- Classes: one class

Statistics
- Total inductees: 1

Precedence
- Next (higher): Highest
- Next (lower): Order of the Yugoslav Star

Order of Yugoslavia (Serbian: Орден Југославије, Orden Jugoslavije) was the highest national order of merit awarded in Serbia and Montenegro (known as the Federal Republic of Yugoslavia until 2003) between 1998 and the dissolution of the Union in 2006. It was intended to be awarded to heads of states and governments, in two variants: on grand collar or on sash.

According to the Law on decorations of 3 December 1998, the Order of Yugoslavia on grand collar was to be automatically awarded to the President of FR Yugoslavia upon their inauguration. Only one insignia of this order (on grand collar) was ever produced, for then incumbent president Slobodan Milošević. His successor, Vojislav Koštunica, declined the order after he was inaugurated. No other person was ever awarded this order.

== Description ==
The new Law on decorations of the Federal Republic of Yugoslavia was proclaimed on 3 December 1998. It kept most of the old orders and decorations of the Socialist Yugoslavia, one of the exceptions being the introduction of the new highest national order of merit - the Order of Yugoslavia. According to the Law, the Order of Yugoslavia was to have one class, but could be awarded on a grand collar (only to the heads of states) or on a sash (to heads of states and heads of governments). It also stipulated that the President of Yugoslavia automatically becomes recipient of the Order of Yugoslavia on grand collar upon inauguration. The order was to be awarded by the President of Yugoslavia (later Serbia and Montenegro).

The Law did not give detailed description of the insignia of any decorations, but gave the Government mandate to do so. The Government adopted a Decision of 17 June 1999 with precise descriptions of the orders and medals, but the Order of Yugoslavia was not mentioned in that decision. The Order of Yugoslavia's insignia was precisely described only in the new Government's Decision of 27 July 2000. The star of the order has five points, and on it is a folk ornament made of gold in the form of a wreath with embedded gems. The central part of the ornament is framed by a golden circle decorated with rubies. The circular base in the center is covered with transparent red enamel on which is the golden coat of arms of the FRY. The grand collar is made of gold it consists of 20 chain pieces that alternately bear the coat of arms of the FRY, and the central piece has engraved laurel branches decorated with four gems.

== History ==
Only one set of insignia of the Order of Yugoslavia was ever produced, in November 1999, for then incumbent President of Yugoslavia, Slobodan Milošević (version with the grand collar). Whether Milošević ever wore this insignia is not known. Upon his arrest in 2001, the insignia was taken from him and kept in a vault of the Ministry of Interior of Serbia until 2014, when it was sent to the National Bank of Serbia.

After being inaugurated for the next President in October 2000, Vojislav Koštunica declined the order that was to be automatically awarded to him. In May 2001, the Law on decorations was amended by the Federal Assembly of Yugoslavia, and the paragraph that stipulated that the President automatically receives the order upon inauguration was removed from the Law.

== See also ==
- Orders, decorations, and medals of the Federal Republic of Yugoslavia
