= Order of the Partisan Star (Yugoslavia) =

Yugoslav military award

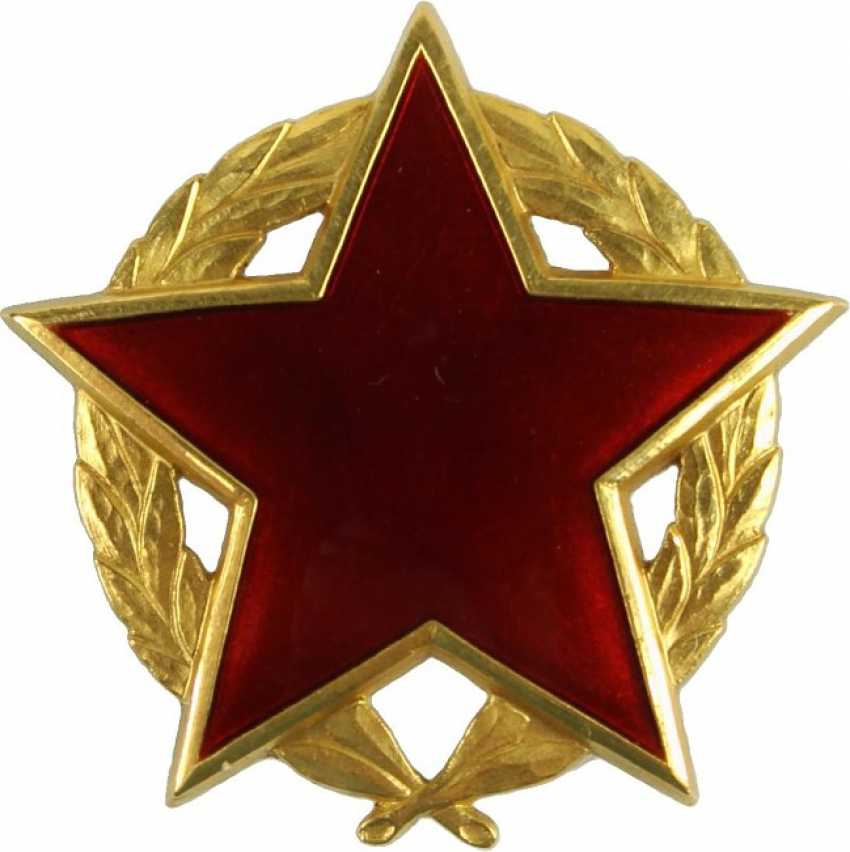
- Order of the Partisan Star with a golden wreath (1st class)
- Type: Three classes
- Awarded for: Participants in the People's Liberation War of Yugoslavia
- Country: Yugoslavia
- Eligibility: Yugoslav or foreign allied civilian and military personnel
- Status: No longer awarded
- Established: 15 August 1943
- First award: 7 September 1944
- Final award: 1980

Highlights
- Total: 12,542
- Ribbon bar of the 1st class

Precedence
- Next (higher): Order of the Yugoslav Flag
- Next (lower): Order of the Republic

The Order of the Partisan Star (Serbo-Croatian: Орден партизанске звезде / Orden partizanske zvijezde, Slovene: Red partizanske zvezde, Macedonian: Орден на партизанската ѕвезда) was a Yugoslav military decoration.

== History ==
The order was established by order of Josip Broz Tito, the supreme commander of the Yugoslav Partisans on August 15, 1943. Depending on the type of personal qualities manifested, the recipient was awarded different orders:

- Order of the Partisan Star with a golden wreath - for skillful command and outstanding services.
- Order of the Partisan Star with a silver wreath - for bravery and feat of a warrior.
- Order of the Partisan Star with rifles - for courage and self-sacrifice.

On March 1, 1961, the act changed the names of the classes and set the name to the Order of Partisan Star to 1st class, 2nd class and 3rd class. All classes continued to be awarded to officers of the Yugoslav People's Army for successful command of units of the armed forces, for skill in conducting combat operations and for showing special courage in fighting the enemy. It could be awarded to both citizens of Yugoslavia and foreign nationals.

The order was awarded in the years 1943-1980 and during that time it was awarded a total of 12,542 times, including:

- 1st class - 627, including 37 foreigners
- 2nd class - 1,531, including 34 foreigners
- 3rd class - 10,384

== Award description ==
The Order of the Partisan Star's badge is made of silver, which is gilded in the case of 1st class. The badge of the order of the 1st class has the shape of a red enamelled five-pointed star placed on a golden laurel wreath. The star is gold lined. In the case of 2nd class, the order is with a wreath and silver edging. In the 3rd clas, the star is not placed on a wreath but lies on crossed rifles. Rifles and edging are silver in this case.

The order was originally granted without a ribbon. In order for the order to be worn according to general customs with other decorations, a ribbon was established in 1961. It is red in the case of 1st class. In 2nd class, the ribbon is red with two yellow stripes. In 3rd class, the ribbon is red with four yellow stripes.

The authors of the design were painter Đorđe Andrejević-Kun and sculptor Antun Augustinčić. The first specimens were made at the Moscow Mint. After the war, they were first produced at the workshop of the Knaus Brothers in Zagreb, and later at the Orešković Marko mint in Zagreb.

| First Class (with golden wreath) | Second Class (with silver wreath) | Third Class (with rifles) |
Ribbons

== See also ==
- Orders, decorations, and medals of the Socialist Federal Republic of Yugoslavia
