= Order of the Yugoslav Star =

Highest order of merit awarded in Yugoslavia

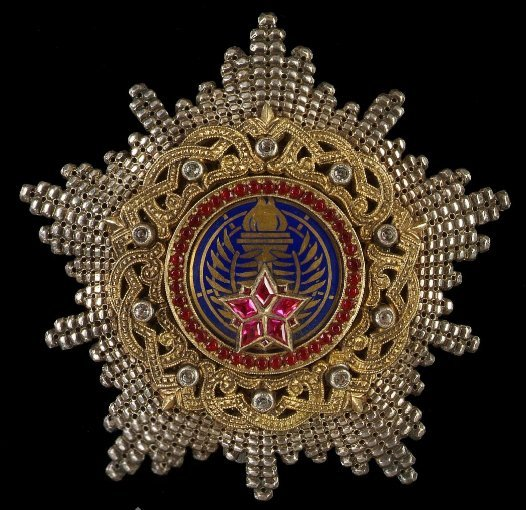
- Star of the Yugoslav Great Star rank
- Type: National order of merit in 4 Classes
- Established: 1 February 1954
- Country: Yugoslavia
- Ribbon
- Awarded for: Development and strengthening of peace and cooperation between nations
- Status: Defunct

Precedence
- Next (higher): Highest
- Next (lower): Order of Freedom

The Order of the Yugoslav Star (Note: Croatian: Orden jugoslavenske zvijezde; Serbian: Орден југословенске звезде, Orden jugoslovenske zvezde; Slovene: Red jugoslovanske zvezde; Macedonian: Орден на југословенската ѕвезда, Orden na jugoslovenskata dzvezda) was the highest national order of merit awarded in Yugoslavia. It was divided into four classes. The highest class, the Yugoslav Great Star was the highest state decoration awarded in Yugoslavia. The order was mostly awarded to foreign heads of state for the development and strengthening of peace and cooperation between nations.

== History ==
Order of the Yugoslav Star was founded by the President of Yugoslavia Josip Broz Tito on 1 February 1954 and had four classes. The highest class, Yugoslav Great Star, was intended for foreign heads of state "for outstanding merits in developing and consolidating peaceful and friendly cooperation between two countries." The first such order was presented to the Emperor of Ethiopia Haile Selassie.

Law on Decorations was amended on 1 March 1961, so from then on, the Order had these classes:

- Yugoslav Great Star — highest decoration in SFR Yugoslavia
- Yugoslav Star with Sash (before 1961 Order of the Yugoslav Star, I Class) — 6th highest decoration in SFR Yugoslavia
- Yugoslav Star with Golden Wreath (before 1961 Order of the Yugoslav Star, II Class) — 14th highest decoration in SFR Yugoslavia
- Yugoslav Star on Cravat (before 1961 Order of the Yugoslav Star, III Class) — 24th highest decoration in SFR Yugoslavia

In 1972, the Law on Decorations was amended again, so that the Yugoslav Great Star could be now awarded not only to heads of states, but also to Yugoslav citizens for "revolutionary work and meritorious service in the development of SFRY, for developing and strengthening the consciousness of our citizens in the fight for the development of socialism, for the freedom and independence of our country, as well as for an extremely valuable contribution to strengthening peaceful cooperation and friendly relations between SFRY and other countries."

Ribbon bars
Yugoslav Great Star (Order of the Yugoslav Great Star)	Yugoslav Star with Sash (Yugoslav Star, I Class)	Yugoslav Star with Golden Wreath (Yugoslav Star, II Class)	Yugoslav Star on Cravat (Yugoslav Star, III Class)

== Recipients of the Great Star ==
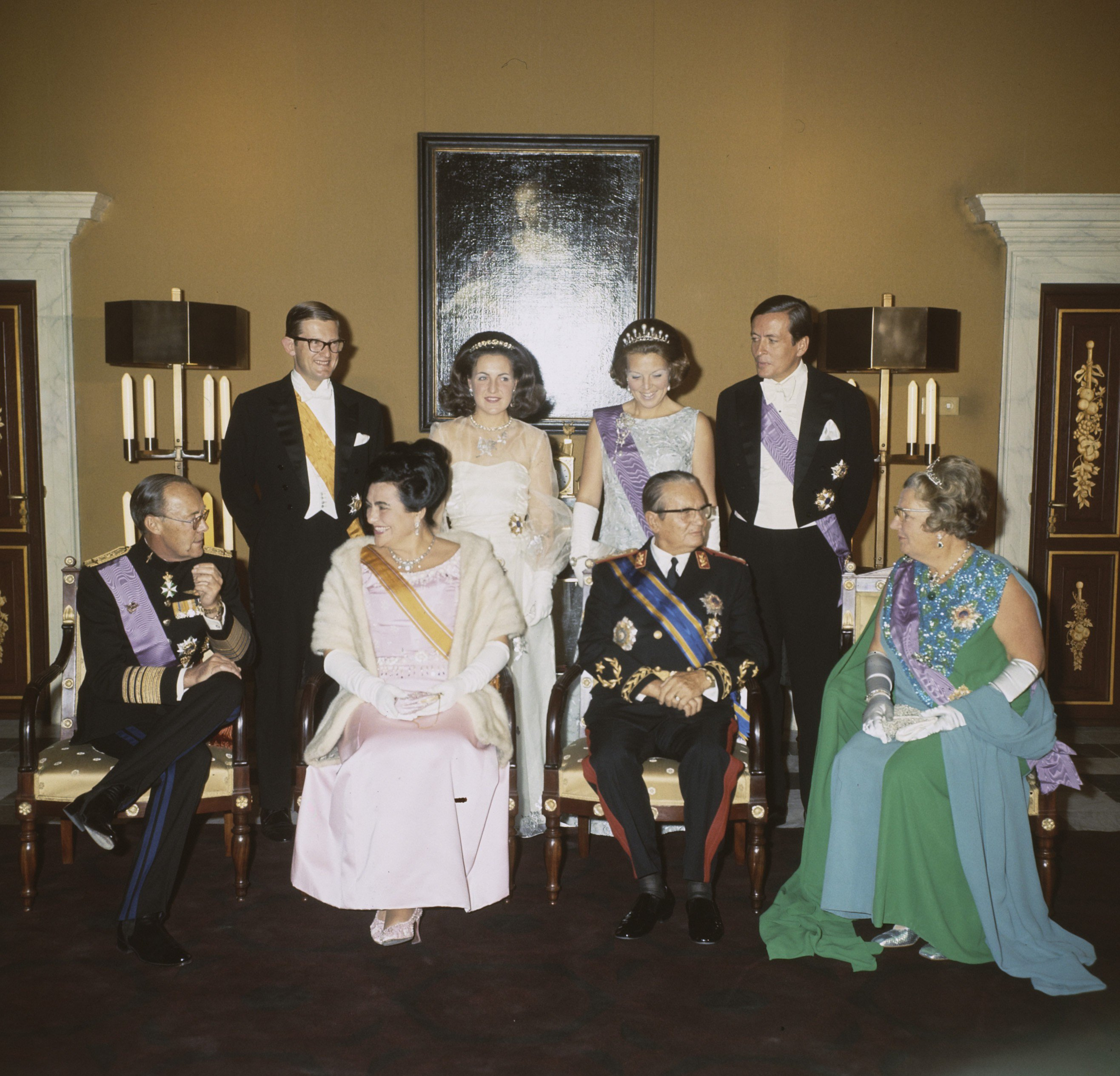
Tito and his wife Jovanka with members of the Dutch royal family. Queen Juliana is wearing the star and the sash of the Yugoslav Great Star, while Tito is wearing the star and sash of the Knight Grand Cross of the Order of the Netherlands Lion (Tito also has the Yugoslav Great Star on his chest). Prince Bernhard is wearing the Yugoslav Star with Sash, while Jovanka is wearing the sash of the Grand Cross of the Order of the Crown.

The Order was usually awarded to foreign heads of state and other distinguished foreigners who visited Yugoslavia. Up to 1985, the Yugoslav Great Star was awarded 127 times of which 115 to foreigners and 12 to Yugoslav citizens.

- (Socialist Federal Republic of Yugoslavia) Josip Broz Tito, President of Yugoslavia - awarded on 1 February 1954
- Haile Selassie, Emperor of Ethiopia – awarded on 11 February 1954
- Celâl Bayar, President of Turkey – awarded on 13 April 1954
- Paul I, King of Greece – awarded on 2 June 1954
- (Post-independence Burma (1948–1962)) Ba U, President of Burma – awarded on 7 January 1955
- Gamal Abdel Nasser, President of Egypt – awarded on 30 December 1955
- René Coty, President of France – awarded on 7 May 1956
- Sukarno, President of Indonesia – awarded on 12 September 1956
- Norodom Suramarit, King of Cambodia – awarded on 6 August 1957
- (Kingdom of Afghanistan) Mohammed Zahir Shah, King of Afghanistan – awarded on 1 November 1960
- Ahmed Sékou Touré, President of Guinea – awarded on 7 January 1961
- Muhammad Ayub Khan, President of Pakistan – awarded on 13 January 1961
- Kwame Nkrumah, President of Ghana – awarded on 2 March 1961
- Sylvanus Olympio, Prime Minister of Togo – awarded on 6 March 1961
- William Tubman, President of Liberia – awarded on 13 March 1961
- Modibo Keïta, President of Mali – awarded on 26 March 1961
- Hassan II, King of Morocco – awarded on 1 April 1961
- Habib Bourguiba, President of Tunisia – awarded on 9 April 1961
- (Soviet Union) Leonid Brezhnev, Chairman of the Presidium of the Supreme Soviet – awarded on 3 October 1962
- Adolfo López Mateos, President of Mexico – awarded on 30 March 1963
- Urho Kekkonen, President of Finland – awarded on 6 May 1963
- João Goulart, President of Brazil – awarded on 21 September 1963
- Jorge Alessandri, President of Chile – awarded on 25 September 1963
- Víctor Paz Estenssoro, President of Bolivia – awarded on 30 September 1963
- Ahmed Ben Bella, President of Algeria – awarded on 12 March 1964
- (Poland) Władysław Gomułka, First Secretary of the Polish United Workers' Party – awarded on 25 June 1964
- Aleksander Zawadzki, Chairman of the Council of State of Poland – awarded on 25 June 1964
- István Dobi, Chairman of the Presidential Council of Hungary – awarded on 15 September 1964
- (Hungary) János Kádár, First Secretary of the Hungarian Socialist Workers' Party and the Chairman of the Council of Ministers – awarded on 15 September 1964
- Antonín Novotný, President of Czechoslovakia – awarded on 26 September 1964
- Olav V, King of Norway – awarded on 13 May 1965
- Walter Ulbricht, Chairman of the State Council of East Germany – awarded on 9 June 1965
- Todor Zhivkov, General Secretary of the Bulgarian Communist Party and Prime Minister of Bulgaria – awarded on 22 September 1965
- (Bulgaria) Georgi Traykov, Chairman of the Presidium of the National Assembly – awarded on 22 September 1965
- (Romania) Nicolae Ceaușescu, General Secretary of the Romanian Communist Party – awarded on 18 April 1966
- (Romania) Chivu Stoica, President of the State Council – awarded on 18 April 1966
- (Pahlavi Iran) Mohammad Reza Pahlavi, Shah of Iran – awarded on 3 June 1966
- Franz Jonas, President of Austria – awarded on 12 February 1967
- Ahmadou Ahidjo, President of Cameroon – awarded on 23 June 1967
- Norodom Sihanouk, Chief of State of Cambodia – awarded on 17 January 1968
- Hirohito, Emperor of Japan – awarded on 8 April 1968
- Yumjaagiin Tsedenbal, First Secretary of the Mongolian People's Revolutionary Party and Prime Minister of Mongolia – awarded on 20 April 1968
- Jamsrangiin Sambuu, Chairman of the Presidium of the People's Great Khural of Mongolia – awarded on 20 April 1968
- Moktar Ould Daddah, President of Mauritania – awarded on 5 September 1968
- Giuseppe Saragat, President of Italy – awarded on 2 October 1969
- (Socialist Federal Republic of Yugoslavia) Edvard Kardelj – awarded on 23 January 1970 for his 60th birthday
- Julius Nyerere, President of Tanzania – awarded on 27 January 1970
- Jomo Kenyatta, President of Kenya – awarded on 12 February 1970
- Kenneth Kaunda, President of Zambia – awarded on 7 May 1970
- Gaafar Nimeiry, Chairman of the National Revolutionary Command Council of Sudan – awarded on 16 June 1970
- (Belgium) Baudouin, King of the Belgians – awarded on 6 October 1970
- Jean, Grand Duke of Luxembourg – awarded on 9 October 1970
- Juliana, Queen of the Netherlands – awarded on 20 October 1970
- Dolores Ibárruri, honorary president of the Communist Party of Spain – awarded on 19 May 1971 for her 75th birthday
- (Socialist Federal Republic of Yugoslavia) Vladimir Bakarić – awarded on 20 April 1972 for his 60th birthday
- Jean-Bédel Bokassa, President of the Central African Republic – awarded on 3 May 1972
- (Socialist Federal Republic of Yugoslavia) Petar Stambolić – awarded on 6 July 1972 for his 60th birthday
- (Socialist Federal Republic of Yugoslavia) Svetozar Vukmanović – awarded on 3 August 1972 for his 60th birthday
- Elizabeth II, Queen of the United Kingdom – awarded on 11 October 1972
- (Poland) Edward Gierek, First Secretary of the Polish United Workers' Party – awarded on 4 May 1973
- Nguyễn Hữu Thọ, Chairman of the Consultative Council of the Provisional Revolutionary Government of the Republic of South Vietnam – awarded on 20 September 1973
- Muammar Gaddafi, Chairman of the Revolutionary Command Council of Libya – awarded on 18 November 1973
- Birendra, King of Nepal – awarded on 2 February 1974
- Hafez al-Assad, President of Syria – awarded on 6 February 1974
- Luis Echeverría, President of Mexico – awarded on 13 February 1974
- (Socialist Federal Republic of Yugoslavia) Lazar Koliševski – awarded on 13 February 1974 for his 60th birthday
- Gustav Heinemann, President of West Germany – awarded on 24 June 1974
- (Myanmar) Ne Win, President of Burma – awarded on 7 October 1974
- (Socialist Federal Republic of Yugoslavia) Veljko Vlahović – awarded on 9 November 1974 for his 60th birthday
- Margrethe II, Queen of Denmark – awarded on 31 October 1974
- (East Germany) Erich Honecker, First Secretary of the Socialist Unity Party of Germany – awarded on 12 November 1974
- Willi Stoph, Chairman of the State Council of East Germany – awarded on 12 November 1974
- (Socialist Federal Republic of Yugoslavia) Đuro Pucar – awarded on 12 December 1974 for his 75th birthday
- (Socialist Federal Republic of Yugoslavia) Blažo Jovanović, President of the Constitutional court of Yugoslavia – awarded on 26 December 1974 for 50 years of revolutionary work
- (Socialist Federal Republic of Yugoslavia) Miha Marinko – awarded on 14 May 1975
- (Socialist Federal Republic of Yugoslavia) Franc Leskošek – awarded on 14 May 1975
- Suharto, President of Indonesia – awarded on 30 June 1975
- Léopold Sédar Senghor, President of Senegal – awarded on 31 August 1975
- Marien Ngouabi, President of the People's Republic of the Congo – awarded on 10 September 1975 (Note: Borba reported that Ngouabi was awarded the Order of the Yugosal Great Star, but his name cannot be found in the Official Gazette (Službeni list SFRJ).)
- Francisco da Costa Gomes, President of Portugal – awarded on 23 October 1975
- (Socialist Federal Republic of Yugoslavia) Jovan Veselinov – awarded on 25 January 1976 for his 70th birthday
- Demetrio B. Lakas, President of Panama – awarded on 15 March 1976
- Omar Torrijos, Head of Government and Military leader of Panama – awarded on 15 March 1976
- Carlos Andrés Pérez, President of Venezuela – awarded on 18 March 1976
- Siad Barre, Chairman of the Supreme Revolutionary Council of Somalia – awarded on 26 March 1976
- Carl XVI Gustaf, King of Sweden – awarded on 29 March 1976
- Konstantinos Tsatsos, President of Greece – awarded on 10 May 1976
- Luís Cabral, Chairman of the Council of State of Guinea-Bissau – awarded on 1 June 1976
- Fahri Korutürk, President of Turkey – awarded on 8 June 1976
- Gnassingbé Eyadéma, President of Togo – awarded on 23 June 1976
- Valéry Giscard d'Estaing, President of France – awarded on 6 December 1976
- Anwar Sadat, President of Egypt – awarded in 13 January 1977 (Note: A Decree was published in the Official Gazette (Službeni list SFRJ) on awarding the Order of the Yugogoslav Great Star to Anwar Sadat. Tito was planned to visit Egypt in January 1977 and to present the order to Sadat during the visit. But, the visit was canceled, and the two never met again. It is not known whether the order was ever presented to Sadat.)
- Agostinho Neto, President of Angola – awarded on 22 April 1977
- Kim Il Sung, President of North Korea – awarded on 29 August 1977
- António Ramalho Eanes, President of Portugal – awarded on 17 October 1977
- Aristides Maria Pereira, President of Cape Verde – awarded on 11 October 1978
- Ziaur Rahman, President of Bangladesh – awarded on 22 November 1978
- Mengistu Haile Mariam, Chairman of the Provisional Military Administrative Council of Socialist Ethiopia – awarded in December 1978
- Jaber Al-Ahmad Al-Jaber Al-Sabah, Emir of Kuwait – awarded on 3 February 1979
- Ahmed Hassan al-Bakr, President of Iraq – awarded on 4 February 1979
- Hussein I, King of Jordan – awarded on 11 February 1979
- Julio César Turbay Ayala, President of Colombia – awarded on 29 June 1979
- France-Albert René, President of Seychelles – awarded on 27 July 1979
- Moussa Traoré, President of Mali – awarded on 17 September 1979
- Sandro Pertini, President of Italy – awarded on 11 October 1979
- Spyros Kyprianou, President of Cyprus – awarded on 7 October 1980
- Jaime Roldós Aguilera, President of Ecuador – awarded on 11 November 1980
- Fernando Belaúnde, President of Peru – awarded on 12 November 1980
- Hilla Limann, President of Ghana – awarded on 18 May 1981
- Shehu Shagari, President of Nigeria – awarded on 8 June 1981
- Muhammad Zia-ul-Haq, President of Pakistan – awarded on 22 January 1982
- Omar Bongo, President of Gabon – awarded on 22 March 1982
- Rudolf Kirchschläger, President of Austria – awarded on 13 April 1982
- Chadli Bendjedid, President of Algeria – awarded on 19 April 1982
- Luis Herrera Campins, President of Venezuela – awarded on 7 April 1983
- Belisario Betancur, President of Colombia - awarded on 12 April 1983
- Hernán Siles Zuazo, President of Bolivia - awarded on 14 April 1983
- Reynaldo Bignone, President of Argentina – awarded on 6 June 1983
- Karl Carstens, President of West Germany – awarded on 5 September 1983
- Samora Machel, President of Mozambique – awarded on 12 October 1983
- François Mitterrand, President of France – awarded on 15 December 1983
- Hosni Mubarak, President of Egypt – awarded on 26 February 1984
- José Eduardo dos Santos, President of Angola – awarded on 3 April 1984
- Miguel de la Madrid, President of Mexico – awarded on 24 January 1985
- Forbes Burnham, President of Guyana – awarded on 15 April 1985
- Juan Carlos I, King of Spain – awarded on 22 May 1985
- Daniel arap Moi, President of Kenya – awarded on 3 June 1985
- Raúl Alfonsín, President of Argentina – awarded on 15 September 1985
- Mauno Koivisto, President of Finland – awarded on 15 April 1986
- Fidel Castro, President of the Council of State and the Council of Ministers and First Secretary of the Communist Party of Cuba – awarded on 14 September 1986
- Gustáv Husák, President of Czechoslovakia – awarded on 21 September 1987
- Jaime Lusinchi, President of Venezuela – awarded on 9 June 1988
- Ibrahim Babangida, President of Nigeria – awarded on 30 July 1988
- Robert Mugabe, President of Zimbabwe – awarded on 23 January 1989
- George Vassiliou, President of Cyprus – awarded on 9 April 1990
- Mário Soares, President of Portugal – awarded on 23 April 1990
- Roh Tae-woo, President of South Korea – awarded on 8 November 1990

== See also ==
- Orders, decorations, and medals of the Socialist Federal Republic of Yugoslavia
- Order of the Yugoslav Star (Federal Republic of Yugoslavia)
