= Orders, decorations, and medals of Serbia and Montenegro =

Orders and medals were awarded in the Federal Republic of Yugoslavia (and later Serbia and Montenegro) between 1998 and 2006.

Before the 1992 Breakup of Yugoslavia, the Orders and medals of the Socialist Federal Republic of Yugoslavia were awarded. Some of the old pre-1992 SFRY orders and medals were retained by FR Yugoslavia, while some new were established. Orders and medals of FR Yugoslavia were regulated by the Law on Decorations of Federal Republic of Yugoslavia adopted on 4 December 1998. Between 1992 and 1998, no decorations were awarded in FR Yugoslavia.

All decorations were divided into four grades: orders, higher decorations, medals and commemorative medals.

== Orders ==
	Order	Ribbon bar	Rank overall
1.	Order of Yugoslavia		1
2.	Order of the Yugoslav Star		
2.	Yugoslav Great Star (I Rank)		2
2.	1st Class (II Rank)		7
2.	2nd Class (III Rank)		20
2.	3rd Class (IV Rank)		31
3.	Order of Freedom		3
4.	Order of the People's Hero		4
5.	Order of the Yugoslav Flag		
5.	1st Class		5
5.	2nd Class		18
5.	3rd Class		29
6.	Order of the War Banner		
6.	1st Class		6
6.	2nd Class		19
6.	3rd Class		30
7.	Order of Merits of FR Yugoslavia		
7.	1st Class		8
7.	2nd Class		21
7.	3rd Class		32
8.	Order of the Victorious Sword		
8.	1st Class		9
8.	2nd Class		22
8.	3rd Class		33
9.	Order of the Yugoslav Army		
9.	1st Class		10
9.	2nd Class		23
9.	3rd Class		34
10.	Order of Nemanja		
10.	1st Class		11
10.	2nd Class		24
10.	3rd Class		35
11.	Order of Njegoš		
11.	1st Class		12
11.	2nd Class		25
11.	3rd Class		36
12.	Order of Vuk Karadžić		
12.	1st Class		13
12.	2nd Class		26
12.	3rd Class		37
13.	Order of Tesla		
13.	1st Class		14
13.	2nd Class		27
13.	3rd Class		38
14.	Order of Labor		15
15.	Order of Bravery		16
16.	Order of Merits in Defence and Security		
16.	1st Class		17
16.	2nd Class		28
16.	3rd Class		39

== Higher decorations ==
Rank	Medal	Ribbon bar
1	Medal of Obilić	
2	Medal of Honor	
3	Medal of Cvijić	
4	Medal of the White Angel	
5	Medal of Humanity	

== Medals ==
Rank	Medal	Ribbon bar
1	State Long Service Medal	
1	40 years of service	
1	30 years of service	
1	20 years of service	
1	10 years of service	
2	Defence and Security Long Service Medal	
2	40 years of service	
2	30 years of service	
2	20 years of service	
2	10 years of service	
3	Medal of Merits in Education and Culture	
3	1st Class	
3	2nd Class	
3	3rd Class	
4	Medal of Merits in Economy	
4	1st Class	
4	2nd Class	
4	3rd Class	
5	Medal of Merits in Agriculture	
5	1st Class	
5	2nd Class	
5	3rd Class	
6	Defense and Security Medal of Merit	
7	Defense and Security Medal of Virtue	

== See also ==
- State decoration
