= Yoraxi Meleán =

Spanish volleyball player

Personal information
- Full name: Yoraxi de los Ángeles Meleán Álvarez
- Nickname: La Flaca
- Nationality: Spanish
- Born: 1 May 1975 (age 51) Maracaibo, Venezuela
- Home town: Logroño, Spain
- Height: 178 cm (5 ft 10 in)
- Weight: 68 kg (150 lb)
- Spike: 275 cm (108 in)
- Block: 272 cm (107 in)

Volleyball information
- Position: Setter
- Current club: CK Ponta Delgada
- Number: 1

National team
- Years: Team
- –: Venezuela (1998-2001) Spain (2002-2012)
Honours
Women's volleyball
Representing Venezuela
Central American and Caribbean Games
| Bronze medal – third place | 1998 Maracaibo | Team |

Yoraxi de los Ángeles Meleán Álvarez (born 1 May 1975 in Maracaibo, Venezuela) is a female Venezuelan born, Spanish volleyball player, playing as a setter. She was part of the Spain national team that competed at the 2005 European Championship.

== Career ==
Meleán won with the Venezuelan club Indias Guerreras de Miranda the bronze medal in the 1995 South American Club Championship played in Medellin, Colombia.

After winning the 1998 Central American and Caribbean Games bronze medal with the Venezuela national team, she signed with the Spanish professional club A Pinguela.

On club level she played for Playas de Benidorm for the 2003/04 and 2004/05 season.

=== 2005 ===
For the 2005-06 she signed in mid-August with Spar Tenerife Marichal, that she found unexpected and confessed she found the signing as a big chance to prove her value. Nonetheless, se was expected to be the back-up setter for Romina Lamas. In early August, Meleán played beach volleyball as an ending exhibition in the Torneo de Tamaduste at El Hierro with Tenerife Marichal teammates including Susana Rodríguez and Esther López. With this team she won the 2005 Spanish Supercup in October 2005.

=== 2006 ===
Having won the previous five Spanish Queen's Cup, Melean's Spar Tenerife Marichal won the 2006 season's competition, defeating Hotel Cantur in the final match, even when Tenerife started that match losing 0-7. After that her team won their third consecutive Spanish Superleague defeating Hotel Cantur again 3-0. After winning all the three titles available for the season, and still having the option to play for Tenerife Marichal, Meleán decided to try the Italian League, signing with The Lions Alfieri Volley Santeramo. She said that the lack of chance to play, being the second setter was the main reason of her change, as she have being promised to be the main player in her position.

=== 2016 ===
Meleán won her third consecutive Spanish League with Naturhouse Ciudad de Logroño, when her team won 3-0 the 2015–16 season's final series against Fígaro Peluqueros Haris, ending the season winning the three club awards, the Supercup, the Queen's Cup and the League.

Starting the new season with Naturhouse Ciudad de Logroño, she won the silver medal in the 2016 Spanish Supercup.

=== 2017 ===
With Naturhouse Ciudad de Logroño, she entered as a substitute to help them claim the silver medal in the 2017 Queen's Cup.

She helped Naturhouse Ciudad de Logroño to win their fourth consecutive Spanish title, after having set a league record of 91 consecutive matches won, in a season where she was playing mainly as a substitute player.

She signed with the Portuguese club Clube Kairos from Ponta Delgada, playing the 2017–18 CEV Challenge Cup with this club and falling 1-3 in their first match against the Belgian Hermes Oostende.

== Clubs ==
- (Venezuela) Indias Guerreras de Miranda (1995)
- (Spain) Agrupación Deportiva A Pinguela (1995-2002)
- (Spain) Visual Home Benidorm (2002-2005)
- (Spain) Spar Tenerife Marichal (2005-2006)
- (Italy) Alfieri Santeramo (2006-2007)
- (Spain) Valeriano Allès Menorca (2007-2012)
- (Spain) Nuchar Tramek Murillo (2012-2014)
- (Spain) Naturhouse Ciudad de Logroño (2014-2016)
- (Portugal) CK Ponta Delgada (2017-2018)

== Awards ==
=== Individuals ===
- 2011–12 Spanish Superliga "Most Valuable Player"
- 2014 Spanish Queen Cup "Most Valuable Player"

=== Clubs ===
- 1995 South American Club Championship – Bronze medal, with Indias Guerreras de Miranda
- 2005 Spanish Supercup - Champion, with Spar Tenerife Marichal
- 2006 Spanish Queen's Cup - Champion, with Spar Tenerife Marichal
- 2005–06 Spanish Superleague - Champion, with Spar Tenerife Marichal
- 2009 Spanish Queen's Cup - Runner-Up, with Valeriano Allés Menorca Volei
- 2009 Spanish Supercup - Runner-Up, with Valeriano Allés Menorca Volei
- 2009–10 Spanish Superleague - Runner-Up, with Valeriano Allés Menorca Volei
- 2011 Spanish Queen's Cup - Runner-Up, with Valeriano Allés Menorca Volei
- 2010–11 Spanish Superleague - Champion, with Valeriano Allés Menorca Volei
- 2011–12 Spanish Superleague - Champion, with Valeriano Allés Menorca
- 2013 Spanish Queen's Cup - Runner-Up, with Nuchar Tramek Murillo
- 2012–13 Spanish Superleague - Runner-Up, with Nuchar Tramek Murillo
- 2013 Spanish Supercup - Champion, with Embalajes Blanco Tramek Murillo
- 2014 Spanish Queen's Cup - Champion, with Embalajes Blanco Tramek Murillo
- 2013–14 Spanish Superleague - Champion, with Embalajes Blanco Tramek Murillo
- 2014 Spanish Supercup - Champion, with Naturhouse Ciudad de Logroño
- 2015 Spanish Queen's Cup - Champion, with Naturhouse Ciudad de Logroño
- 2014–15 Spanish Superleague - Champion, with Naturhouse Ciudad de Logroño
- 2015 Spanish Supercup - Champion, with Naturhouse Ciudad de Logroño
- 2016 Spanish Queen's Cup - Champion, with Naturhouse Ciudad de Logroño
- 2015–16 Spanish Superleague - Champion, with Naturhouse Ciudad de Logroño
- 2016 Spanish Supercup - Runner-Up, with Naturhouse Ciudad de Logroño
- 2017 Spanish Queen's Cup - Runner-Up, with Naturhouse Ciudad de Logroño
- 2016–17 Spanish Superleague - Champion, with Naturhouse Ciudad de Logroño
