= 2014–15 Superliga Femenina de Voleibol =

Superliga Femenina 2014–15
- League: Superliga Femenina
- Sport: volleyball
- Duration: October 11, 2014–March 21, 2015 (regular season); March 28–April 18 (2nd stage); April 25–May 2 (Final)
- Teams: 11

Summary
- Season champions: Naturhouse Ciudad de Logroño
- Runners-up: GH Leadernet Navarcable
- Season MVP: Helia González
- Top scorer: Helia González
- Promoted to Superliga 2: Emevé & Atlantic Holding
- Relegated to Superliga 2: Emevé

Superliga Femenina seasons
- ← 2013–14 2015–16 →

Superliga Femenina de Voleibol 2014–15 was the 46th season since its establishment. This season comprises regular season, 2nd phase and Final. Regular season started on October 11, 2014, and 2nd phase matches finished on April 18, 2015.

Naturhouse Ciudad de Logroño and GH Leadernet Navarcable played the Championship Final to the best of three matches.

Defending champions Naturhouse Ciudad de Logroño won its second title in a row after defeating GH Leadernet Navarcable 3–0 in the Final.

== Teams ==
2014–15 Superliga Femenina de Voleibol teams
Canary Islands

Team	Stadium	Capacity	City/Area
Naturhouse Ciudad de Logroño	CDM Lobete	1,100	Logroño
GH Leadernet Navarcable	Pabellón Universitario	3,000	Pamplona
CVB-Barça	L'Hospitalet Nord	1,000	Barcelona
IBSA ACE Gran Canaria	Centro Insular	5,200	Las Palmas de Gran Canaria
Avarca de Menorca	Pavelló Municipal	2,500	Ciutadella, Balearic Islands
Haro Rioja Voley	El Ferial	800	Haro
Feel Volley Alcobendas	Luis Buñuel	100	Alcobendas
Extremadura Arroyo	Pabellón Municipal	1,000	Arroyo de la Luz
Aguere	Juan Ríos Tejera	3,500	San Cristóbal de La Laguna
UCAM Voley Murcia	Infante	500	Murcia
Emevé	Palacio de Deportes	3,500	Lugo
Atlantic Holding	Multifuncional de Bayás	1,200	Miranda de Ebro

== Regular season standings ==
Pos	Team	Pld	W	L	Pts	SW	SL	SR	SPW	SPL	SPR	Qualification or relegation
1	Naturhouse Ciudad de Logroño	20	20	0	60	60	2	30.000	1549	1065	1.454	Qualified for 2nd phase
2	GH Leadernet Navarcable	20	16	4	48	51	17	3.000	1619	1399	1.157	Qualified for 2nd phase
3	Aguere	20	14	6	39	43	32	1.344	1641	1627	1.009	Qualified for 2nd phase
4	Avarca de Menorca	20	11	9	35	41	31	1.323	1587	1530	1.037	Qualified for 2nd phase
5	UCAM Voley Murcia	20	11	9	31	41	42	0.976	1767	1826	0.968	Qualified for 2nd phase
6	CVB-Barça	20	9	11	27	32	37	0.865	1510	1564	0.965	Qualified for 2nd phase
7	Feel Volley Alcobendas	20	9	11	27	33	40	0.825	1571	1640	0.958	Qualified for 2nd phase
8	IBSA ACE Gran Canaria	20	8	12	22	32	44	0.727	1638	1640	0.999	Qualified for 2nd phase
9	Extremadura Arroyo	20	5	15	18	27	47	0.574	1577	1696	0.930	
10	Haro Rioja Voley	20	5	15	15	24	52	0.462	1602	1764	0.908	
11	Emevé	20	2	18	8	18	58	0.310	1460	1770	0.825	Relegated

== 2nd phase standings ==
=== Group A ===
Pos	Team	Pld	W	L	Pts	SW	SL	SR	SPW	SPL	SPR	Qualification
1	Naturhouse Ciudad de Logroño	6	6	0	18	18	0	MAX	458	291	1.574	Qualified for Final
2	IBSA ACE Gran Canaria	6	4	2	10	12	10	1.200	490	442	1.109	
3	Avarca de Menorca	6	2	4	8	10	12	0.833	469	490	0.957	
4	UCAM Voley Murcia	6	0	6	0	0	18	0.000	256	450	0.569	

=== Group B ===
Pos	Team	Pld	W	L	Pts	SW	SL	SR	SPW	SPL	SPR	Qualification
1	GH Leadernet Navarcable	6	5	1	16	17	5	3.400	531	451	1.177	Qualified for Final
2	Aguere	6	4	2	11	15	10	1.500	547	520	1.052	
3	Feel Volley Alcobendas	6	2	4	7	10	14	0.714	511	524	0.975	
4	CVB-Barça	6	1	5	2	4	17	0.235	408	502	0.813	

== Final ==
=== Match 1 ===
Date	Time		Score		Set 1	Set 2	Set 3	Set 4	Set 5	Total	Report
25 Apr	19:00	Naturhouse Ciudad de Logroño	3–1	GH Leadernet Navarcable	20–25	25–21	25–17	25–23		95–86	Box Score

==== Match 2 ====
Date	Time		Score		Set 1	Set 2	Set 3	Set 4	Set 5	Total	Report
26 Apr	19:00	Naturhouse Ciudad de Logroño	3–2	GH Leadernet Navarcable	25–27	25–20	21–25	25–19	15–12	111–103	Box Score

==== Match 3 ====
Date	Time		Score		Set 1	Set 2	Set 3	Set 4	Set 5	Total	Report
2 May	19:00	GH Leadernet Navarcable	1–3	Naturhouse Ciudad de Logroño	20–25	25–22	18–25	24–26		87–98	Box Score

2014–15 Superliga Femenina winners
(La Rioja)
Naturhouse Ciudad de Logroño
Second title

== Top scorers ==
(This statistics includes regular season and playoff matches.)

Rk	Name	Team	Points	Sets	PPS
1	(United Kingdom) Janine Sandell	Aguere	475	105	4,52
2	(United States) Therese McNatt	GH Leadernet Navarcable	446	95	4,69
3	(Spain) Nerea Sánchez	CVB-Barça	397	96	4,14
4	(Brazil) Soraya Fraga	IBSA ACE Gran Canaria	369	90	4,1
5	(Brazil) Daniela da Silva	Naturhouse Ciudad de Logroño	340	76	4,47
