= 2016–17 Superliga Femenina de Voleibol =

2016–17 Superliga Femenina
- League: Superliga Femenina
- Sport: volleyball
- Duration: October 15, 2016–March 25, 2017 (regular season); April 22–28 (playoff)
- Teams: 11

Summary
- Season champions: Naturhouse Ciudad de Logroño
- Runners-up: Fígaro Peluqueros Haris
- Season MVP: Daniela da Silva
- Promoted to Superliga 2: DSV CV Sant Cugat
- Relegated to Superliga 2: Extremadura Arroyo 30

Superliga Femenina seasons
- ← 2015–16 2017–18 →

2016–17 Superliga Femenina de Voleibol was the 48th season since its establishment in 1970. Twelve teams played the championship this season.

The season comprises regular season and championship playoff. Regular season started on October 15, 2016 and ended on March 25, 2017. Championship playoff began on April 9 with semifinals.

Top four teams when finishing regular season play playoff while two bottom teams are relegated.

Naturhouse Ciudad de Logroño won its four title in a row (2014, 2015, 2016 & 2017) after defeating Fïgaro Peluqueros Haris in the Championship Final playoff 3–0.

== Teams ==
2016–17 Superliga Femenina de Voleibol teams
Canary Islands

Team	Stadium	Capacity	City/Area
Naturhouse Ciudad de Logroño	CDM Lobete	1,100	Logroño
Fígaro Peluqueros Haris	Pablos Abril	500	San Cristóbal de La Laguna
Haro Rioja Voley	El Ferial	800	Haro
Feel Volley Alcobendas	Luis Buñuel	100	Alcobendas
IBSA Gran Canaria	Centro Insular	5,200	Las Palmas de Gran Canaria
Avarca de Menorca	Pavelló Municipal	2,500	Ciutadella, Balearic Islands
DISA Aguere Tenerife	Juan Ríos Tejera	3,500	San Cristóbal de La Laguna
CVB-Barça	L'Hospitalet Nord	1,000	Barcelona
VP Madrid	CDM Entrevías	700	Madrid
Extremadura Arroyo	Pabellón Municipal	1,000	Arroyo de la Luz
DSV Sant Cugat	Pavelló Municipal de Valldoreix	700	Sant Cugat del Vallès

== Regular season standings ==
Pos	Team	Pld	W	L	Pts	SW	SL	SR	SPW	SPL	SPR	Qualification or relegation
1	Naturhouse Ciudad de Logroño	20	20	0	59	60	6	10.000	1625	1107	1.468	Qualification to playoffs
2	Fígaro Peluqueros Haris	20	17	3	50	52	20	2.600	1671	1483	1.127	Qualification to playoffs
3	Hario Rioja Voley	20	13	7	41	49	29	1.690	1755	1564	1.122	
4	Feel Volley Alcobendas	20	12	8	34	43	36	1.194	1767	1704	1.037	
5	Aguere Tenerife	20	11	9	32	40	36	1.111	1665	1600	1.041	
6	CVB Barça	20	10	10	28	34	37	0.919	1544	1583	0.975	
7	Avarca de Menorca	20	8	12	28	36	41	0.878	1643	1686	0.974	
8	IBSA Gran Canaria	20	7	13	21	34	47	0.723	1681	1830	0.919	
9	DSV Sant Cugat	20	6	14	17	28	49	0.571	1590	1739	0.914	
10	VP Madrid	20	4	16	12	18	52	0.346	1281	1659	0.772	Relegation to Superliga 2
11	Extremadura Arroyo 30	20	2	18	8	16	57	0.281	1435	1702	0.843	Relegation to Superliga 2

== Championship playoff ==
=== Bracket ===
Final
1	Naturhouse Ciudad de Logroño	3	3	3
2	Fígaro Peluqueros Haris	0	1	2

=== Final ===
==== Match 1 ====
Date	Time		Score		Set 1	Set 2	Set 3	Set 4	Set 5	Total	Report
22 Apr	19:00	Naturhouse Ciudad de Logroño	3–0	Fígaro Peluqueros Haris	25–13	25–15	25–16			75–44	Boxscore

==== Match 2 ====
Date	Time		Score		Set 1	Set 2	Set 3	Set 4	Set 5	Total	Report
23 Apr	19:00	Naturhouse Ciudad de Logroño	3–1	Fígaro Peluqueros Haris	25–18	21–25	26–24	25–19		97–86	Boxscore

==== Match 3 ====
Date	Time		Score		Set 1	Set 2	Set 3	Set 4	Set 5	Total	Report
28 Apr	21:00	Fígaro Peluqueros Haris	2–3	Naturhouse Ciudad de Logroño	20–25	25–17	25–22	18–25	10–15	98–104	Boxscore

2016–17 Superliga Femenina winners
(La Rioja)
Naturhouse Ciudad de Logroño
Fourth title

== Top scorers ==
(Regular season and playoff statistic combined.)

Rk	Name	Team	Points	Sets	PPS
1	(Brazil) Daniela da Silva	Naturhouse Ciudad de Logroño	386	87	4,44
2	(United States) Alyssa Dibbern	Haro Rioja Voley	328	93	3,53
3	(Spain) María Schlegel	Haro Rioja Voley	325	91	3,57
4	(Spain) Helia González	Naturhouse Ciudad de Logroño	319	78	4,09
5	(Brazil) Daniele Batista	Fígaro Peluqueros Haris	312	100	3,12
6	(Spain) Diana Sánchez	Aguere Tenerife	311	91	3,42
7	(Brazil) Carla Moreira	DSV Sant Cugat	308	65	4,74
8	(Brazil) Sylvia Campos	IBSA Gran Canaria	304	81	3,75
9	(Portugal) Marta Santos	CVB-Barça	301	85	3,54
10	(United States) Jessica Wagner	Fígaro Peluqueros Haris	297	98	3,03
