= 2013–14 Superliga Femenina de Voleibol =

Superliga Femenina 2013–14
- League: Superliga Femenina
- Sport: volleyball
- Duration: October 26, 2013–March 29, 2014 (regular season); April 5–April 26 (playoffs)
- Teams: 12

Summary
- Season champions: Embalajes Blanco Tramek Murillo
- Runners-up: GH Leadernet
- Promoted to Superliga 2: Dulce de Leche Mardel, Feel Volley Alcobendas, Extremadura Arroyo & Sant Cugat
- Relegated to Superliga 2: Sant Cugat & UCAM Voley Murcia

Superliga Femenina seasons
- ← 2012–13 2014–15 →

Superliga Femenina de Voleibol 2013–14 was the 45th season since its establishment. The season comprises regular season and championship playoffs. Regular season started in October 2013, and finished on March 29, 2014.

Championship playoffs began on April 5, with semifinal matches and finished with the Final matches during April.

Defending champions are Haro Rioja Voley having defeated Nuchar Tramek Murillo in the championship playoff final of previous season.

Embalajes Blanco Tramek Murillo won its first title after defeating 3–0 in the Championship playoff final.

== 2013–14 season teams ==
2013–14 Superliga Femenina de Voleibol teams
Canary Islands

Team	Stadium	Capacity	City/Area
Haro Rioja Voley	El Ferial	800	Haro
Embalaj. Blanco Tramek Murillo	García Lorca	1,000	Murillo de Río Leza
UCAM Voley Murcia	Infante	500	Murcia
CVB-Barça	L'Hospitalet Nord	1,000	Barcelona
GH Leadernet	Pabellón Universitario	3,000	Pamplona
Valeriano Allès Menorca	Pavelló Municipal	2,500	Ciutadella, Balearic Islands
IBSA ACE Gran Canaria 2014	Carlos García San Román	500	Las Palmas
Aguere	Juan Ríos Tejera	3,500	San Cristóbal de La Laguna
Dulce de leche Mardel	Pavelló Vall d'Hebron	1,670	Barcelona
Feel Volley Alcobendas	Luis Buñuel	100	Alcobendas
Extremadura Arroyo	Pabellón Municipal	1,000	Arroyo de la Luz
Sant Cugat	Valldoreix	500	Sant Cugat del Vallès

== 2013–14 season standings ==
#	Team	P	Wx3	Wx2	Lx1	Lx0	Sets+	Sets–	Points+	Points–	Pts	Qualification or relegation
1	Embalaj. Blanco Tramek Murillo	22	20	1	0	1	64	8	1761	1292	62	Final playoffs
2	GH Leadernet	22	17	1	1	3	58	17	1791	1432	54	Final playoffs
3	CVB Barça	22	10	5	2	5	49	35	1870	1759	42	Final playoffs
4	IBSA ACE Gran Canaria 2014	22	10	2	4	6	46	37	1869	1739	38	Final playoffs
5	Valeriano Allès Menorca	22	9	4	2	7	46	41	1896	1890	37	
6	Haro Rioja Voley	22	10	1	4	7	42	39	1752	1774	36	
7	Feel Volley Alcobendas	22	9	2	2	9	42	39	1791	1754	33	
8	Extremadura Arroyo	22	9	2	1	10	39	41	1780	1790	32	
9	Dulce de leche Mardel	22	5	4	4	9	37	48	1775	1855	27	Relegated
10	Aguere	22	4	3	1	14	27	53	1669	1873	19	
11	Sant Cugat	22	3	0	3	16	21	59	1563	1861	12	Relegated
12	UCAM Voley Murcia	22	1	0	1	20	10	64	1303	1801	4	

== Championship playoffs ==
All times are CEST, except for Canary Islands which is WEST.

=== Bracket ===
- To best of three games.

Semi-finals
1	Embalaj. Blanco Tramek Murillo	3	3	3
4	IBSA ACE Gran Canaria 2014	1	1	0
2	GH Leadernet	3	3	1	2	3
3	CVB Barça	1	1	3	3	2

Final
1	Embalaj. Blanco Tramek Murillo	3	3	3
2	GH Leadernet	1	0	0

2013–14 Superliga Femenina winners
(La Rioja)
Embalajes Blanco Tramek Murillo
First title

=== Semifinals ===
==== Match 1 ====
Date	Time		Score		Set 1	Set 2	Set 3	Set 4	Set 5	Total	Report
5 Apr	18:30	GH Leadernet	3–1	CVB Barça	34–32	25–15	19–25	25–23		103–95	Box Score
5 Apr	19:00	Embalaj. Blanco Tramek Murillo	3–1	IBSA ACE Gran Canaria 2014	23–25	25–23	25–23	25–9		98–80	Box Score

==== Match 2 ====
Date	Time		Score		Set 1	Set 2	Set 3	Set 4	Set 5	Total	Report
6 Apr	12:00	Embalaj. Blanco Tramek Murillo	3–1	IBSA ACE Gran Canaria 2014	25–16	31–29	20–25	25–16		101–86	Box Score
6 Apr	18:30	GH Leadernet	3–1	CVB Barça	23–25	25–22	25–23	25–22		98–92	Box Score

==== Match 3 ====
Date	Time		Score		Set 1	Set 2	Set 3	Set 4	Set 5	Total	Report
12 Apr	16:00	IBSA ACE Gran Canaria 2014	0–3	Embalaj. Blanco Tramek Murillo	22–25	19–25	21–25			62–75	Box Score
12 Apr	18:00	CVB Barça	3–1	GH Leadernet	25–22	23–25	25–19	32–30		105–96	Box Score

==== Match 4 ====
Date	Time		Score		Set 1	Set 2	Set 3	Set 4	Set 5	Total	Report
13 Apr	13:00	CVB Barça	3–2	GH Leadernet	25–23	26–28	17–25	25–23	15–10	108–109	Box Score

==== Match 5 ====
Date	Time		Score		Set 1	Set 2	Set 3	Set 4	Set 5	Total	Report
16 Apr	20:00	GH Leadernet	3–2	CVB Barça	25–20	22–25	26–24	20–25	15–9	108–103	Box Score

=== Final ===
==== Match 1 ====
Date	Time		Score		Set 1	Set 2	Set 3	Set 4	Set 5	Total	Report
19 Apr	19:00	Embalaj. Blanco Tramek Murillo	3–1	GH Leadernet	33–35	25–15	25–22	26–24		109–96	Box Score

==== Match 2 ====
Date	Time		Score		Set 1	Set 2	Set 3	Set 4	Set 5	Total	Report
20 Apr	19:00	Embalaj. Blanco Tramek Murillo	3–0	GH Leadernet	25–15	25–20	25–19			75–54	Box Score

==== Match 3 ====
Date	Time		Score		Set 1	Set 2	Set 3	Set 4	Set 5	Total	Report
26 Apr	18:30	GH Leadernet	0–3	Embalaj. Blanco Tramek Murillo	12–25	28–30	20–25			60–80	Box Score

== Top scorers ==
(This statistics includes regular season and playoff matches.)

Rk	Name	Team	Points	Sets	PPS
1	(Spain) Mar Arranz	Dulce de leche Mardel	379	75	5,053
2	(Ukraine) Natalia Kvasnytsya	Aguere	370	74	5,000
3	(Brazil) Daniela da Silva	Embalaj. Blanco Tramek Murillo	362	77	4,701
4	(United States) Therese McNatt	Valeriano Allès Menorca	395	87	4,540
5	(Cuba) Magaly Carvajal	IBSA ACE Gran Canaria 2014	411	91	4,516
