= 2015–16 Superliga Femenina de Voleibol =

Superliga Femenina 2015–16
- League: Superliga Femenina
- Sport: volleyball
- Duration: October 10, 2015–April 2, 2016 (regular season); April 9– (playoff)
- Teams: 11

Summary
- Season champions: Naturhouse Ciudad de Logroño
- Runners-up: Fígaro Peluqueros Haris
- Season MVP: Helia González
- Promoted to Superliga 2: Fígaro Peluqueros Haris & VP Madrid
- Relegated to Superliga 2: None

Superliga Femenina seasons
- ← 2014–15 2016–17 →

Superliga Femenina de Voleibol 2015–16 was the 47th season since its establishment in 1970. Eleven teams played the championship this season.

The season comprises regular season and championship playoff. Regular season started on October 10, 2015 and ended on April 2, 2016. Championship playoff began on April 9 with semifinals.

Top four teams when finishing regular season play playoff while two bottom teams are relegated.

Naturhouse Ciudad de Logroño won its third title in a row (2014, 2015 & 2016) after defeating Fïgaro Peluqueros Haris in the Championship Final playoff 3–0.

== Teams ==
2015–16 Superliga Femenina de Voleibol teams
Canary Islands

Team	Stadium	Capacity	City/Area
Naturhouse Ciudad de Logroño	CDM Lobete	1,100	Logroño
GH Leadernet Navarcable	Pabellón Universitario	3,000	Pamplona
Aguere	Juan Ríos Tejera	3,500	San Cristóbal de La Laguna
Avarca de Menorca	Pavelló Municipal	2,500	Ciutadella, Balearic Islands
CVB-Barça	L'Hospitalet Nord	1,000	Barcelona
Feel Volley Alcobendas	Luis Buñuel	100	Alcobendas
IBSA CCO 7 Palmas ACEGC	Centro Insular	5,200	Las Palmas de Gran Canaria
Extremadura Arroyo	Pabellón Municipal	1,000	Arroyo de la Luz
Haro Rioja Voley	El Ferial	800	Haro
Fígaro Peluqueros Haris	Pablos Abril	500	San Cristóbal de La Laguna
VP Madrid	CDM Entrevías	700	Madrid

== Regular season standings ==
Pos	Team	Pld	W	L	Pts	SW	SL	SR	SPW	SPL	SPR	Qualification or relegation
1	Naturhouse Ciudad de Logroño	20	20	0	59	60	7	8.571	1643	1227	1.339	Qualification to playoffs
2	Fígaro Peluqueros Haris	20	16	4	45	51	25	2.040	1732	1628	1.064	Qualification to playoffs
3	Haro Rioja Voley	20	14	6	40	47	29	1.621	1746	1575	1.109	Qualification to playoffs
4	Feel Volley Alcobendas	20	13	7	39	46	30	1.533	1733	1664	1.041	Qualification to playoffs
5	GH Leadernet Navarcable	20	13	7	36	46	32	1.438	1753	1639	1.070	
6	IBSA CCO 7 Palmas ACE GC	20	9	11	30	36	39	0.923	1614	1641	0.984	
7	Avarca de Menorca	20	9	11	24	32	44	0.727	1611	1730	0.931	
8	Aguere Tenerife	20	5	15	20	28	50	0.560	1629	1759	0.926	
9	CVB Barça	20	4	16	13	25	53	0.472	1641	1810	0.907	
10	VP Madrid	20	4	16	13	23	52	0.442	1536	1760	0.873	Relegation to Superliga 2
11	Extremadura Arroyo	20	3	17	11	22	55	0.400	1604	1809	0.887	Relegation to Superliga 2

== Championship playoff ==
=== Bracket ===
Semi-finals
1	Naturhouse Ciudad de Logroño	3	3	3
4	Feel Volley Alcobendas	0	1	0
2	Fígaro Peluqueros Haris	3	2	1	3	3
3	Haro Rioja Voley	2	3	3	2	0

Final
1	Naturhouse Ciudad de Logroño	3	3	3
2	Fígaro Peluqueros Haris	0	2	1

=== Semifinals ===
==== Match 1 ====
Date	Time		Score		Set 1	Set 2	Set 3	Set 4	Set 5	Total	Report
9 Apr	16:30	Naturhouse Ciudad de Logroño	3–0	Feel Volley Alcobendas	25–21	25–17	25–17			75–55	Boxscore
9 Apr	18:00	Fígaro Peluqueros Haris	3–2	Haro Rioja Voley	23–25	27–25	28–26	19–25	15–9	112–110	Boxscore

==== Match 2 ====
Date	Time		Score		Set 1	Set 2	Set 3	Set 4	Set 5	Total	Report
10 Apr	18:00	Fígaro Peluqueros Haris	2–3	Haro Rioja Voley	25–16	15–25	30–28	4–25	10–15	84–109	Boxscore
10 Apr	16:30	Naturhouse Ciudad de Logroño	3–1	Feel Volley Alcobendas	25–21	25–16	23–25	25–22		98–84	Boxscore

==== Match 3 ====
Date	Time		Score		Set 1	Set 2	Set 3	Set 4	Set 5	Total	Report
16 Apr	18:00	Feel Volley Alcobendas	0–3	Naturhouse Ciudad de Logroño	22–25	22–25	19–25			63–75	Boxscore
16 Apr	18:00	Haro Rioja Voley	3–1	Fígaro Peluqueros Haris	25–20	25–23	22–25	25–18		97–86	Boxscore

==== Match 4 ====
Date	Time		Score		Set 1	Set 2	Set 3	Set 4	Set 5	Total	Report
17 Apr	12:00	Haro Rioja Voley	2–3	Fígaro Peluqueros Haris	26–24	18–25	20–25	25–19	8–15	97–108	Boxscore

==== Match 5 ====
Date	Time		Score		Set 1	Set 2	Set 3	Set 4	Set 5	Total	Report
20 Apr	20:00	Fígaro Peluqueros Haris	3–0	Haro Rioja Voley	25–16	25–22	25–23			75–61	Boxscore

=== Final ===
==== Match 1 ====
Date	Time		Score		Set 1	Set 2	Set 3	Set 4	Set 5	Total	Report
23 Apr	18:00	Naturhouse Ciudad de Logroño	3–0	Fígaro Peluqueros Haris	25–14	25–19	25–20			75–53	Boxscore

==== Match 2 ====
Date	Time		Score		Set 1	Set 2	Set 3	Set 4	Set 5	Total	Report
24 Apr	18:00	Naturhouse Ciudad de Logroño	3–2	Fígaro Peluqueros Haris	23–25	22–25	25–21	25–12	15–8	110–91	Boxscore

==== Match 3 ====
Date	Time		Score		Set 1	Set 2	Set 3	Set 4	Set 5	Total	Report
30 Apr	18:00	Fígaro Peluqueros Haris	1–3	Naturhouse Ciudad de Logroño	20–25	11–25	25–22	17–25		73–97	Boxscore

2015–16 Superliga Femenina winners
(La Rioja)
Naturhouse Ciudad de Logroño
Third title

== Top scorers ==
(Regular season and playoff statistic combined.)

Rk	Name	Team	Points	Sets	PPS
1	(Spain) Rocío Gómez	Haro Rioja Voley	412	97	4,25
2	(United Kingdom) Janine Sandell	Fígaro Peluqueros Haris	408	115	3,55
3	(Argentina) Maira Westergaard	Haro Rioja Voley	388	101	3,84
4	(Spain) Esther Rodríguez	Feel Volley Alcobendas	356	94	3,79
5	(Spain) Patricia Suárez	Fígaro Peluqueros Haris	350	113	3,1
6	(Spain) Helia González	Naturhouse Ciudad de Logroño	349	80	4,36
7	(Serbia) Brankica Nikić	GH Leadernet Navarcable	326	84	3,88
8	(Spain) Noelia Sánchez	Fígaro Peluqueros Haris	323	115	2,81
9	(Spain) Nerea Sánchez	CVB-Barça	315	78	4,04
10	(Spain) Diana Sánchez	GH Leadernet Navarcable	299	94	3,18
