= 2011–12 Superliga Femenina de Voleibol =

Superliga Femenina 2011–12
- League: Superliga Femenina
- Sport: volleyball
- Duration: November 19, 2011–April 14, 2012 (regular season); April 21, 2012–May 12, 2012 (playoffs)
- Teams: 9

Summary
- Season champions: Valeriano Allés Menorca
- Runners-up: Haro Rioja Voley
- Season MVP: Yoraxi Meleán, Valeriano Allés Menorca
- Promoted to Superliga 2: UCAM Voley Murcia & Nuchar Eurochamp Murillo
- Relegated to Superliga 2: Universidad de Burgos & Cantabria Deporte

Superliga Femenina seasons
- ← 2010–11 2012–13 →

Superliga Femenina de Voleibol 2011–12 was the 43rd season since its establishment. The 2011–12 season started in October 2011, and finished in April 2012.

Defending champions, Valeriano Allès Menorca were able to defend its previous season title and won its second title in a row.

== 2011–12 season teams ==
2011-12 Superliga Femenina de Voleibol teams
Canary Islands

Team	Stadium	Capacity	City/Area
Valeriano Allès Menorca	Pavelló Municipal	2,500	Ciutadella de Menorca, Balearic Islands
Nuchar Eurochamp Murillo	García Lorca	1,000	Murillo de Río Leza, La Rioja
Haro Rioja Voley	El Ferial	700	Haro, La Rioja
UCAM Voley Murcia	Infante	500	Murcia
Universidad de Burgos	El Plantío	2,500	Burgos
Playa de las Canteras	Carlos García San Román	700	Las Palmas de Gran Canaria
Cantabria Deporte	La Habana Vieja	500	Torrelavega, Cantabria
Jamper Aguere	Juan Ríos Tejera	3,500	San Cristóbal de La Laguna
Cuesta Piedra Santa Cruz	Palacio Municipal	4,500	Santa Cruz de Tenerife

== 2011–12 season standings ==
#	Team	P	Wx3	Wx2	Lx1	Lx0	Sets+	Sets–	Points+	Points–	Pts	Qualification or relegation
1	Valeriano Allès Menorca	16	13	1	0	2	43	10	1286	981	41	Final playoffs
2	Nuchar Eurochamp Murillo	16	13	1	0	2	42	13	1320	1088	41	Final playoffs
3	Haro Rioja Voley	16	10	0	1	5	36	21	1325	1168	31	Final playoffs
4	UCAM Voley Murcia	16	9	1	2	4	35	21	1251	1173	31	Final playoffs
5	Universidad de Burgos	16	8	0	1	7	31	27	1328	1210	25	Relegated
6	Playa de las Canteras	16	6	1	0	9	23	32	1173	1246	21	
7	Cantabria Deporte	16	4	1	2	9	22	37	1201	1355	16	Relegated
8	Jamper Aguere	16	3	1	0	12	16	40	1202	1311	11	
9	Cuesta Piedra Sta. Cruz	16	0	0	0	16	1	48	678	1232	0	

== Championship playoffs ==
=== Bracket ===
- To best of three games.

Semi-finals
1	Valeriano Allès Menorca	3	3	3
4	UCAM Voley Murcia	0	0	0
2	Nuchar Eurochamp Murillo	1	3	2	0
3	Haro Rioja Voley	3	0	3	3

Final
1	Valeriano Allès Menorca	3	3	3
3	Haro Rioja Voley	1	0	0

2011–12 Superliga Femenina winners
(Balearic Islands)
Valeriano Allès Menorca
Second title

=== Semifinals ===
==== Match 1 ====
Date	Time		Score		Set 1	Set 2	Set 3	Set 4	Set 5	Total	Report
21 Apr	17:30	Nuchar Eurochamp Murillo	1–3	Haro Rioja Voley	25–18	20–25	27–29	18–25		90–97	Report
21 Apr	18:00	Valeriano Allés Menorca	3–0	UCAM Voley Murcia	31–29	25–19	25–17			81–65	Report

==== Match 2 ====
Date	Time		Score		Set 1	Set 2	Set 3	Set 4	Set 5	Total	Report
22 Apr	12:00	Nuchar Eurochamp Murillo	3–0	Haro Rioja Voley	25–20	26–24	25–22			76–66	Report
22 Apr	18:00	Valeriano Allés Menorca	3–0	UCAM Voley Murcia	25–15	25–21	25–17			75–53	Report

==== Match 3 ====
Date	Time		Score		Set 1	Set 2	Set 3	Set 4	Set 5	Total	Report
28 Apr	18:00	UCAM Voley Murcia	0–3	Valeriano Allés Menorca	21–25	22–25	24–26			67–76	Report
28 Apr	19:00	Haro Rioja Voley	3–2	Nuchar Eurochamp Murillo	25–13	15–25	21–25	25–22	15–13	101–98	Report

==== Match 4 ====
Date	Time		Score		Set 1	Set 2	Set 3	Set 4	Set 5	Total	Report
29 Apr	12:00	Haro Rioja Voley	3–0	Nuchar Eurochamp Murillo	26–24	25–18	27–25			78–67	Report

=== Final ===
==== Match 1 ====
Date	Time		Score		Set 1	Set 2	Set 3	Set 4	Set 5	Total	Report
5 May	19:00	Valeriano Allés Menorca	3–1	Haro Rioja Voley	25–15	25–16	20–25	25–19		95–75	Report

==== Match 2 ====
Date	Time		Score		Set 1	Set 2	Set 3	Set 4	Set 5	Total	Report
6 May	18:00	Valeriano Allés Menorca	3–0	Haro Rioja Voley	25–14	25–22	25–15			75–51	Report

==== Match 3 ====
Date	Time		Score		Set 1	Set 2	Set 3	Set 4	Set 5	Total	Report
12 May	18:00	Haro Rioja Voley	0–3	Valeriano Allés Menorca	23–25	20–25	20–25			63–75	Report

== Top scorers ==
(This statistics includes regular season, copa de la reina and supercopa matches.)

Rk	Name	Team	Games	Points	PPG
1	(Spain) Noelia Sánchez	Haro Rioja Voley	23	301	3,67
2	(Brazil) Soraya Fraga	Universidad de Burgos	18	280	4,37
3	(Spain) María José Garrido	Haro Rioja Voley	23	274	3,34
4	(Cuba) Regla Bell	Nuchar Eurochamp Murillo	19	273	4,14
5	(Spain) Ana Correa	Valeriano Allès Menorca	23	258	3,53
