= Supercopa de España de Voleibol Femenino =

Spanish Volleyball Tournament

Supercopa de Voleibol Femenino
- Sport: Volleyball
- Founded: 1990
- First season: 1990
- Administrator: Real Federación Española de Voleibol (RFEVB)
- No. of teams: 2
- Country: Spain
- Most recent champion: Heidelberg Volkswagen (2025)
- Most titles: VB Logroño (6 titles)
- Broadcasters: RTVE Play; Teledeporte; RFEVB streaming
- Website: RFEVB

The Supercopa de España de Voleibol Femenino (Spanish Women's Volleyball Super Cup in English) is an annual Spanish women's volleyball tournament played by the Superliga Femenina champions and Copa de la Reina winners. It is organized and administrated by the Real Federación Española de Voleibol (Spanish Volleyball Royal Federation).

The tournament was established in 1990 but it was contested from 1991 to 2001. It usually takes place in October.

== Results ==
Year	Venue	Champion	Score	Runner-up	Reference
1990	Polideportivo Provincial San José, Guadalajara	RCD Espanyol	3–1 (15–10, 15–6, 7–15, 15–9)	CV Tormo Barberá	
1991	Not held				
1992*		Afelsa Los Compadres	3–0 (15–2, 15–12, 15–5)	RCD Espanyol	
1993–2001	Not held				
2002	Pabellón Anduva, Miranda de Ebro	Tenerife Marichal	3–0 (25–21, 25–19, 26–24)	Universidad de Burgos	
2003	Centro Insular de Deportes, Las Palmas	Tenerife Marichal	3–1 (27–25, 18–25, 25–12, 25–16)	Hotel Cantur Costa Mogán	
2004	Pabellón Municipal de Los Pajaritos, Soria	Tenerife Marichal	3–1 (21–25, 25–22, 25–20, 25–16)	Caja de Ávila CSC	
2005	Pabellón Insular Santiago Martín, La Laguna	Spar Tenerife Marichal	3–0 (25–19, 25–23, 25–16)	Hotel Cantur	
2006	Pabellón Multifuncional de Bayas, Miranda de Ebro	Grupo 2002 Murcia	3–0 (25–14, 25–14, 25–19)	Universidad de Burgos	
2007	Palau D'Esports L'illa de Benidorm, Benidorm	Grupo 2002 Murcia	3–1 (19–25, 25–20, 25–18, 25–23)	Spar Tenerife Marichal	
2008	Pabellón Insular Santiago Martín, La Laguna	Tubillete.com Tenerife Marichal	3–1 (25–18, 25–18, 14–25, 25–21)	Palma Volley	
2009	Pabellón Príncipe de Asturias, Murcia	CAV Murcia 2005	3–2 (25–21, 25–17, 17–25, 23–25, 15–10)	Valeriano Allés Menorca	
2010	Pabellón Príncipe de Asturias, Murcia	CAV Murcia 2005	W.O. (Jamper Aguere did not attend to match)	Jamper Aguere	
2011	Did not held				
2012	Polideportivo El Ferial, Haro	Haro Rioja Voley	3–0 (25–18, 25–20, 25–10)	Valeriano Allés Menorca	
2013	Polideportivo Federico García Lorca, Murillo de Río Leza	Embalajes Blanco Tramek Murillo	3–0 (25–19, 25–14, 25–18)	Haro Rioja Voley	
2014	Centro Deportivo Municipal Lobete, Logroño	Naturhouse Ciudad de Logroño	3–0 (25–13, 25–13, 25–18)	Avarca Menorca	
2015	Centro Deportivo Municipal Lobete, Logroño	Naturhouse Ciudad de Logroño	3–0 (25–16, 25–18, 25–21)	GH Leadernet Navarcable	
2016	Pabellón Pablos Abril, La Laguna	Figaro Peluqueros Haris	3–1 (25–21, 21–25, 26–24, 25–23)	Naturhouse Ciudad de Logroño	
2017	Pabellón Pablos Abril, La Laguna	Fachadas Dimurol Libby's	0–3 (9–25, 21–25, 18–25)	Minis Arluy Logroño	
2017	CMD Lobete, Logroño	Minis Arluy Logroño	3–2^{(6–2)} (22–25, 25–18, 8–25, 25–23, 15–13)	Fachadas Dimurol Libby's	
2018	CMD Lobete, Logroño	Minis Arluy Logroño	3–1 (25–14, 25–20, 23–25, 25–21)	Fachadas Dimurol Libby's	
2019	Pabellón Pablos Abril, La Laguna	May Deco VB Logroño	3–0 (25–12, 25–14, 25–22)	Sanaya Libby's La Laguna	
2020	Polideportivo Municipal de Ciutadella, Ciutadella de Menorca	Avarca de Menorca	3–0 (25–11, 25–19, 25–22)	Sayre CC La Ballena	
2021	Centro Insular de Deportes, Las Palmas	Gran Canaria Urbaser	3–2 (23–25, 25–16, 25–19, 18–25, 15–10)	Feel Volley Alcobendas	
2022	Pabellón Insular Santiago Martín, La Laguna	Tenerife Libby's La Laguna	3–1 (25–22, 21–25, 25–22, 25–12)	Arenal Emevé	
2023	Pabellón Insular Santiago Martín, La Laguna	Hidramar Gran Canaria	3–1 (25–16, 25–16, 20–25, 25–19)	Tenerife Libby's La Laguna	
2024	Gran Canaria Arena, Las Palmas	Avarca de Menorca	3–1 (26–24, 23–25, 25–20, 26–24)	Hidramar Gran Canaria	
2025	Palacio Multiusos, Guadalajara	Heidelberg Volkswagen	3–2 (20–25, 25–22, 25–16, 24–26, 15–10)	Avarca de Menorca	

Source: Real Federación Española de Voleibol (RFEVB)
* Note: Unofficial title, as the match played in 1992 is not recognized by the RFEVB.

== Titles by club ==
Club	Titles	Runner-up	Champion Years
Minis Arluy VB Logroño	6	1	2013, 2014, 2015, 2017, 2018, 2019
Tenerife Marichal	5	1	2002, 2003, 2004, 2005, 2008
CAV Murcia 2005	4	-	2006, 2007, 2009, 2010
Tenerife Libby's La Laguna	2	4	2016, 2022
Avarca de Menorca	2	4	2020, 2024
Hidramar Gran Canaria	2	1	2021, 2023
Haro Rioja Voley	1	1	2012
RCD Espanyol	1	-	1990
Heidelberg Volkswagen	1	-	2025
Universidad de Burgos	-	2	
Hotel Cantur	-	2	
CV Tormo Barberá	-	1	
GH Leadernet Navarcable	-	1	
Palma Volley	-	1	
Caja de Ávila CSC	-	1	
Jamper Aguere	-	1	
Sayre CC La Ballena	-	1	
Feel Volley Alcobendas	-	1	
Arenal Emevé	-	1	

== Individual awards ==
The following players received the most valuable player award.

- 2005 – Virginie de Carne (BEL)
- 2006 – Lioubov Kilic (RUS)
- 2007 – Małgorzata Glinka (POL)
- 2008 – Yasmina Hernández (ESP)
- 2009 – Prisilla Rivera (DOM)
- 2010 – not awarded
- 2012 – Helia González (ESP)
- 2013 – Fernanda Gritzbach (BRA)
- 2014 – Iva Pejkovic (SRB)
- 2015 – Iva Pejkovic (SRB)
- 2016 – Daniele Batista (BRA)
- 2020 – Maira Westergaard (ARG)
- 2021 – Raquel Montoro (ESP)
- 2022 – Lisbet Arredondo (CUB)
