= 2012–13 Superliga Femenina de Voleibol =

Superliga Femenina 2012–13
- League: Superliga Femenina
- Sport: volleyball
- Duration: November 3, 2012–March 23, 2013 (regular season); March 29–April 27 (playoffs)
- Teams: 10

Summary
- Season champions: Haro Rioja Voley
- Runners-up: Nuchar Tramek Murillo
- Season MVP: Helia González, Haro Rioja Voley
- Promoted to Superliga 2: A Pinguela, Barcelona & GH Ecay Leadernet
- Relegated to Superliga 2: Santa Cruz de Tenerife & A Pinguela

Superliga Femenina seasons
- ← 2011–12 2013–14 →

Superliga Femenina de Voleibol 2012–13 was the 44th season since its establishment. The 2012–13 regular season started in November 2012, and finished on March 23, 2013. Championship playoffs began March 29 with semifinal matches and finished on 27 April with the 4th match of the Final.

Defending champions were Valeriano Allès Menorca having defeated Haro Rioja Voley in the championship playoff final from past season.

Haro Rioja Voley won its first ever title of Superliga after defeating 3–1 to Nuchar Tramek Murillo in the Championship playoffs Final.

== 2012–13 season teams ==
2012–13 Superliga Femenina de Voleibol teams
Canary Islands

Team	Stadium	Capacity	City/Area
Valeriano Allès Menorca	Pavelló Municipal	2,500	Ciutadella de Menorca, Balearic Islands
Nuchar Eurochamp Murillo	García Lorca	1,000	Murillo de Río Leza, La Rioja
Haro Rioja Voley	El Ferial	700	Haro, La Rioja
UCAM Voley Murcia	Infante	500	Murcia
ACE Gran Canaria 2014	Carlos García San Román	700	Las Palmas de Gran Canaria
Aguere	Juan Ríos Tejera	3,500	San Cristóbal de La Laguna
Santa Cruz de Tenerife	Palacio Municipal	4,500	Santa Cruz de Tenerife
A Pinguela	Pabellón Municipal	600	Monforte de Lemos, Lugo
CVB Barça	L'Hospitalet Nord	1,000	Barcelona
GH Ecay Leadernet	Pabellón Universitario	3,000	Pamplona

== 2012–13 season standings ==
#	Team	P	Wx3	Wx2	Lx1	Lx0	Sets+	Sets–	Points+	Points–	Pts	Qualification or relegation
1	Haro Rioja Voley	18	16	0	1	1	51	9	1444	1037	49	Final playoffs
2	Nuchar Tramek Murillo	18	14	3	0	1	51	11	1469	1066	48	Final playoffs
3	UCAM Voley Murcia	18	11	2	2	3	45	22	1537	1304	39	Final playoffs
4	CVB Barça	18	10	1	1	6	37	25	1392	1230	33	Final playoffs
5	GH Ecay Leadernet	18	7	3	3	5	37	32	1514	1431	30	
6	Valeriano Allès Menorca	18	9	0	3	6	35	31	1423	1395	30	
7	ACE Gran Canaria 2014	18	4	2	0	12	20	41	1204	1401	16	
8	A Pinguela	18	4	0	1	13	19	44	1238	1466	13	Relegated
9	Aguere	18	3	0	0	15	11	45	993	1353	9	
10	Santa Cruz de Tenerife	18	1	0	0	17	5	51	854	1385	3	Relegated

== Championship playoffs ==
=== Bracket ===
- To best of three games.

Semi-finals
1	Haro Rioja Voley	3	3	3
4	CVB Barça	1	1	0
2	Nuchar Tramek Murillo	3	3	3
3	UCAM Voley Murcia	2	1	0

Final
1	Haro Rioja Voley	2	3	3	3
2	Nuchar Tramek Murillo	3	2	0	1

2012–13 Superliga Femenina winners
(La Rioja)
Haro Rioja Voley
First title

=== Semifinals ===
==== Match 1 ====
Date	Time		Score		Set 1	Set 2	Set 3	Set 4	Set 5	Total	Report
29 Mar	19:00	Nuchar Tramek Murillo	3–2	UCAM Voley Murcia	23–25	25–17	30–28	21–25	15–8	114–103	Report
30 Mar	18:00	Haro Rioja Voley	3–1	CVB Barça	25–17	28–26	21–25	25–21		99–89	Report

==== Match 2 ====
Date	Time		Score		Set 1	Set 2	Set 3	Set 4	Set 5	Total	Report
30 Mar	19:00	Nuchar Tramek Murillo	3–1	UCAM Voley Murcia	21–25	25–23	25–21	25–19		96–88	Report
31 Mar	18:00	Haro Rioja Voley	3–1	CVB Barça	28–26	25–27	25–16	25–20		103–89	Report

==== Match 3 ====
Date	Time		Score		Set 1	Set 2	Set 3	Set 4	Set 5	Total	Report
5 Apr	18:00	UCAM Voley Murcia	0–3	Nuchar Tramek Murillo	16–25	25–27	21–25			62–77	Report
5 Apr	20:00	CVB Barça	0–3	Haro Rioja Voley	22–25	23–25	17–25			62–75	Report

=== Final ===
==== Match 1 ====
Date	Time		Score		Set 1	Set 2	Set 3	Set 4	Set 5	Total	Report
20 Apr	18:00	Haro Rioja Voley	2–3	Nuchar Tramek Murillo	24–26	20–25	25–22	25–21	12–15	106–109	Report

==== Match 2 ====
Date	Time		Score		Set 1	Set 2	Set 3	Set 4	Set 5	Total	Report
21 Apr	18:00	Haro Rioja Voley	3–2	Nuchar Tramek Murillo	25–21	25–18	19–25	18–25	16–14	103–103	Report

==== Match 3 ====
Date	Time		Score		Set 1	Set 2	Set 3	Set 4	Set 5	Total	Report
26 Apr	20:00	Nuchar Tramek Murillo	0–3	Haro Rioja Voley	25–27	23–25	25–27			73–79	Report

==== Match 4 ====
Date	Time		Score		Set 1	Set 2	Set 3	Set 4	Set 5	Total	Report
27 Apr	19:00	Nuchar Tramek Murillo	1–3	Haro Rioja Voley	21–25	25–20	22–25	18–25		86–95	Report

== Top scorers ==
(This statistics includes regular season and playoff matches.)

Rk	Name	Team	Points	Sets	PPS
1	(United States) Therese McNatt	Valeriano Allès Menorca	285	61	4,672
2	(Spain) Marisa Fernández	Nuchar Eurochamp Murillo	314	74	4,243
3	(Spain) Nerea Sánchez	CVB Barça	258	62	4,161
4	(Spain) Helia González	Haro Rioja Voley	345	83	4,157
5	(Spain) Silvia Bedmar	GH Ecay Leadernet	272	69	3,942
