= CV Barcelona =

Spanish women's volleyball club from Barcelona

CVB Barça
- Full name: Club Voleibol Barcelona
- Founded: 1994
- Ground: L'Hospitalet Nord, Barcelona (Capacity: 1,000)
- Chairman: Georgina Tomás
- Manager: Adrián Fiorenza
- League: Superliga Femenina
- 2015–16: Superliga Femenina, 9th Place
- Website: (in Catalan) Club home page

Uniforms
Home	Away

Club Voleibol Barcelona also known as CVB Barça is a Spanish women's volleyball club from Barcelona and currently plays in the Spanish Superliga.

== History ==
The club was founded in 1994, following the folding of RCD Espanyol Volleyball team which happened a year earlier. It reached the first Spanish division for the first time in 1998–99. After an agreement made in 2004, the club was absorbed by FC Barcelona, effectively becoming its volleyball department. After years playing outside the first division the club was promoted to the Spanish Superliga in 2011–12. A third place finish in the 2013–14, allowed the team to participate for the first time of a European competition, the 2014–15 CEV Women's Challenge Cup.

== Honours ==
- Superliga Femenina 2

Winners (2): 2020–21, 2023-24

- Copa Princesa

Winners (2): 2022-23, 2023-24

- Catalan League

Winners (7): 2010-11, 2012-13, 2014-15, 2015-16, 2016-17, 2017-18, 2018-19

== Seasons results ==
Competition	Season	Position	Competition	Season	Position	Competition	Season	Position	Competition	Season	Position
Liga FEV	2008–09	1st Place and Promoted to Superliga 2	Copa de la Reina	2009	DNP	Supercopa	2009	DNP			
Superliga 2	2009–10	4th Place	Copa de la Reina	2010	DNP	Supercopa	2010	DNP			
Superliga 2	2010–11	4th Place	Copa de la Reina	2011	DNP	Supercopa	2011	DNP			
Superliga 2	2011–12	2nd Place and Promoted to Superliga	Copa de la Reina	2012	DNP	Supercopa	2012	DNP			
Superliga	2012–13	4th Place in the regular season & Semi Finals in Playoff	Copa de la Reina	2013	Semifinals	Supercopa	2013	DNP			
Superliga	2013–14	3rd Place in the regular season & Semi Finals in Playoff	Copa de la Reina	2014	Quarter-finals	Supercopa	2014	DNP			
Superliga	2014–15	6th Place in the regular season	Copa de la Reina	2015	Semifinals	Supercopa	2015	DNP	Challenge Cup	2014–15	2nd Round
Superliga	2015–16	9th Place in the regular season	Copa de la Reina	2016	DNP	Supercopa	2016	DNP			

== Team ==
2016–17 Team
No	Name	Date of Birth	Height	Weight	Position
2	(Spain) Mireia Alcón Cans	22 January 1998 (age 27)	1.85 m (6 ft 1 in)		Outside hitter
3	(Spain) Clara Carbonell Pipo	18 July 1996 (age 29)	1.77 m (5 ft 10 in)		Outside hitter
4	(Spain) Clara Barceló	14 August 1998 (age 27)	1.65 m (5 ft 5 in)		Libero
5	(Spain) María del Mar Estarellas Colom	3 February 1997 (age 28)	1.86 m (6 ft 1 in)		Outside hitter
6	(Spain) María Sanchís	30 June 1992 (age 33)	1.73 m (5 ft 8 in)		Setter
7	(Portugal) Marta Santos Hurst	7 July 1992 (age 33)	1.82 m (6 ft 0 in)		Outside hitter
8	(Lithuania) Erika Kliokmanaite	13 January 1985 (age 40)	1.88 m (6 ft 2 in)		Outside hitter
9	(Spain) Mireia Carmona	17 December 1990 (age 34)	1.75 m (5 ft 9 in)	70 kg (150 lb)	Setter
10	(Spain) Laura Carmona	12 May 1988 (age 37)	1.72 m (5 ft 8 in)	68 kg (150 lb)	Libero
12	(Spain) Sofía Muller	23 April 1992 (age 33)	1.82 m (6 ft 0 in)	76 kg (168 lb)	Opposite
13	(Spain) Mariola Michelini Solá	16 August 1998 (age 27)	1.82 m (6 ft 0 in)		Outside hitter
14	(United States) Evyn MacCoy	7 October 1992 (age 33)	1.88 m (6 ft 2 in)		Middle blocker
16	(Spain) Mireia Orozco	9 June 1993 (age 32)	1.79 m (5 ft 10 in)	69 kg (152 lb)	Opposite
18	(Italy) Eleonora Guzzi	16 June 1994 (age 31)	1.84 m (6 ft 0 in)	76 kg (168 lb)	Middle blocker
19	(Spain) Andrea Walsh Capdevila	4 February 1998 (age 27)	1.76 m (5 ft 9 in)		Outside hitter
20	(Spain) Anna Grima Ruiz	30 January 1998 (age 27)	1.86 m (6 ft 1 in)		Middle blocker
Head coach : (Argentina) Adrián Fiorenza

2015–16 Team
No	Name	Date of Birth	Height	Weight	Position
02.	(Spain) Nerea Sánchez	2 June 1987 (age 38)	1.88 m (6 ft 2 in)	70 kg (150 lb)	Outside hitter
03.	(Spain) Clara Carbonell	18 July 1996 (age 29)	1.77 m (5 ft 10 in)	70 kg (150 lb)	Outside hitter
04.	(Spain) Maria Antonia Gomila	20 December 1996 (age 28)	1.58 m (5 ft 2 in)	59 kg (130 lb)	Libero
07.	(Argentina) Camila Maldonado	5 March 1994 (age 31)	1.89 m (6 ft 2 in)	80 kg (180 lb)	Middle blocker
08.	(Spain) Anna Muller	13 April 1995 (age 30)	1.83 m (6 ft 0 in)	74 kg (163 lb)	Outside Hitter
09.	(Spain) Mireia Carmona	17 December 1990 (age 34)	1.75 m (5 ft 9 in)	70 kg (150 lb)	Setter
10.	(Spain) Laura Carmona	12 May 1988 (age 37)	1.72 m (5 ft 8 in)	68 kg (150 lb)	Libero
12.	(Spain) Sofía Muller	23 April 1992 (age 33)	1.82 m (6 ft 0 in)	76 kg (168 lb)	
14.	(Venezuela) Mayra Vasquez	1 April 1982 (age 43)	1.75 m (5 ft 9 in)	70 kg (150 lb)	
16.	(Spain) Mireia Orozco Andreu	9 June 1993 (age 32)	1.79 m (5 ft 10 in)	69 kg (152 lb)	
17.	(Spain) Micaela Mamone	24 July 1997 (age 28)	1.84 m (6 ft 0 in)	74 kg (163 lb)	Middle blocker
18.	(Italy) Eleonora Guzzi	16 June 1994 (age 31)	1.84 m (6 ft 0 in)	76 kg (168 lb)	Middle blocker
Head coach : (Spain) Xavier Perales

2014–15 Team
No	Name	Date of Birth	Height	Weight	Position
01.	(Spain) Anna Newsome	31 July 1997 (age 28)	1.75 m (5 ft 9 in)	69 kg (152 lb)	Outside hitter
02.	(Spain) Nerea Sánchez	2 June 1987 (age 38)	1.88 m (6 ft 2 in)	70 kg (150 lb)	Outside hitter
03.	(Spain) Clara Carbonell	18 July 1996 (age 29)	1.77 m (5 ft 10 in)	70 kg (150 lb)	Outside hitter
04.	(Spain) Maria Antonia Gomila	20 December 1996 (age 28)	1.58 m (5 ft 2 in)	59 kg (130 lb)	Libero
07.	(Argentina) Camila Maldonado	5 March 1994 (age 31)	1.89 m (6 ft 2 in)	80 kg (180 lb)	Middle blocker
08.	(Spain) Andrea Iriondo	30 January 1994 (age 31)	1.82 m (6 ft 0 in)	75 kg (165 lb)	
09.	(Spain) Mireia Carmona	17 December 1990 (age 34)	1.75 m (5 ft 9 in)	70 kg (150 lb)	Setter
10.	(Spain) Laura Carmona	12 May 1988 (age 37)	1.72 m (5 ft 8 in)	68 kg (150 lb)	Libero
11.	(Spain) Sara Esteban Calvo	11 February 1993 (age 32)	1.86 m (6 ft 1 in)	78 kg (172 lb)	
12.	(Spain) Sofía Muller	23 April 1992 (age 33)	1.82 m (6 ft 0 in)	76 kg (168 lb)	
13.	(Spain) Mabel Caro	13 March 1991 (age 34)	1.84 m (6 ft 0 in)	74 kg (163 lb)	Middle blocker
14.	(Spain) Laura Reñé	1 July 1997 (age 28)	1.82 m (6 ft 0 in)	74 kg (163 lb)	
15.	(Spain) Nayaret Gil Alarcón	25 December 1995 (age 29)	1.79 m (5 ft 10 in)	72 kg (159 lb)	
16.	(Spain) Mireia Orozco Andreu	9 June 1993 (age 32)	1.79 m (5 ft 10 in)	69 kg (152 lb)	
17.	(Spain) Micaela Mamone	24 July 1997 (age 28)	1.84 m (6 ft 0 in)	74 kg (163 lb)	Middle blocker
18.	(Italy) Eleonora Guzzi	16 June 1994 (age 31)	1.84 m (6 ft 0 in)	76 kg (168 lb)	Middle blocker

== Notable players ==
- (Spain) Nerea Sánchez
- (Spain) Lara Raspall
