= Ingrid Visser (volleyball) =

Dutch volleyball player (1977–2013)

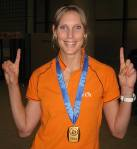

Personal information
- Full name: Ingrid Louise Visser
- Born: 4 June 1977; Gouda, Netherlands
- Died: 14 May 2013 (aged 35); Molina de Segura, Spain
- Height: 1.90 m (6 ft 3 in)
- Weight: 74 kg (163 lb)
- Spike: 314 cm (124 in)
- Block: 298 cm (117 in)

Volleyball information
- Position: Middle-blocker

Career
Years	Teams
1984–1994; 1994–1997; 1997–1999; 2000–2001; 2001–2003; 2003–2007; 2007–2008; 2008–2009; 2009–2011; 2011–2013	VC Nesselande; VVC Vught; Minas Tênis Clube; Vicenza Volley; CV Las Palmas; CV Tenerife; TVC Amstelveen; Leningradka; CAV Murcia 2005; VC Baku

National team
1994–2011	Netherlands (514)
Honours
Women's volleyball
Representing the Netherlands
European Championship
Gold medal – first place	1995 Netherlands	Team
Silver medal – second place	2009 Poland	Team
World Grand Prix
Gold medal – first place	2007 Ningbo	Team
- Last updated: 11 April 2017

Ingrid Louise Visser (4 June 1977 – 14 May 2013) was a Dutch female volleyball player, a member of the Netherlands women's national volleyball team in 1994–2011, a participant of the 1996 Olympic Games and 1995 European Champion.

== Career ==
=== National team ===
Visser debuted in the Dutch volleyball team in 1994 in a friendly match against Ukraine. In 1995 she won the title of European Champion after winning the final match against Croatia 3–0 in the Netherlands. She was a member of the Dutch women's team at the 1996 Olympic Games in Atlanta, United States. Her team took fifth place in the Olympic tournament. In 2007, Visser received the golden federation's pin because of her record status as an international and her merits for volleyball in the Netherlands. On 4 October 2009, the Netherlands, including Visser, won the silver medal of the 2009 European Championship in Poland. They lost the final match against Italy 3–0. In total she played five World Championships, nine European Championships and the Olympics. From 1994 to 2011 Visser played 514 matches with the national team, which is a record number for a Dutch player in any team sports. Officially she ended her volleyball career on 4 February 2012.

== Death ==
On 13 May 2013, Visser and her boyfriend Lodewijk Severein disappeared shortly after checking into a hotel in the city of Murcia, Spain. They were supposed to meet a doctor the next day but failed to turn up, and the authorities were alerted. Their rental car was found on a city street more than a week later. Their bodies were found on 27 May 2013 in a shallow grave in a lemon grove, two weeks after they disappeared in the region. The pair had been abducted and killed. Spanish police arrested Juan Cuenca Lorente, ex-director of volleyball club CAV Murcia 2005, and Romanian nationals Valentin Ion and Constatin Stan. The police stated that there had been "certain business disagreements" between the murdered couple and the three men under arrest. Severein and Cuenca had planned to exploit a marble quarry, but these plans never materialized and Severein had requested several hundred thousand Euros of his investment to be returned. During the trial, Valentin Ion admitted to being present during the murder and that it took place on 14 May. After two years of investigation, the Spanish prosecution sought a 50-year prison sentence.

In November 2016 Valentin Ion and Juan Cuenca Lorente were sentenced to a 34-year prison term, but on appeal in March 2017 the prison terms were increased to 40 years.

== See also ==
- Lists of solved missing person cases

== Sporting achievements ==
=== Clubs ===
==== CEV Champions' League ====
- 2003/2004 - with CV Tenerife

==== CEV Challenge Cup ====
- 2000/2001 - with Vicenza Volley

==== National championships ====
- 1995/1996 Dutch Cup, with VVC Vught
- 1995/1996 Dutch Championship, with VVC Vught
- 1996/1997 Dutch Cup, with VVC Vught
- 1996/1997 Dutch Championship, with VVC Vught
- 2002/2003 Spanish Championship, with CV Tenerife
- 2003/2004 Spanish Championship, with CV Tenerife
- 2003/2004 Spanish Cup, with CV Tenerife
- 2004/2005 Spanish Championship, with CV Tenerife
- 2004/2005 Spanish Cup, with CV Tenerife
- 2005/2006 Spanish Championship, with CV Tenerife
- 2005/2006 Spanish Cup, with CV Tenerife
- 2007/2008 Dutch Championship, with TVC Amstelveen
- 2007/2008 Dutch Cup, with TVC Amstelveen
- 2010/2011 Spanish Cup, with CAV Murcia 2005

=== National team ===
- 1995 CEV European Championship
- 2007 FIVB World Grand Prix
- 2009 CEV European Championship

=== Individually ===
- 2004 CEV Champions League - Best Blocker
