= Hypogeum of Torre del Ram =

Archaeological site in Ciutadella de Menorca, Spain

- Location within Spain
- 40°0′20.7″N 3°48′34.1″E
- Periods: Bronze Age
- Location: Ciutadella de Menorca, Menorca, Spain

History
- Built: 1700—1400 BC

The Hypogeum of Torre del Ram is an archaeological site in Cala en Blanes, Ciutadella de Menorca. It is a Bronze Age funerary hypogeum, used as a collective tomb by a family or a small community. Even though it was emptied in later centuries and reused as a cattle shelter, causing the loss of all information regarding the interred population, grave goods, and chronology, its resemblance to other prehistoric tombs of Menorca dates it to between 1700 and 1400 BC.

A stepped corridor leads to the tomb's rectangular chamber, which has a stone bench that surrounds its internal perimeter. Part of the stone gallery, which used to cover the corridor and the entrance, is still preserved; this was built using the Cyclopean technique.

The corridor is 2.60 m long, while the dimensions of the chamber are: 8.80 m long, 2.50 m wide, and 1.95 m high.

The walls of the internal chamber present several engravings representing three sailing ships and other undetermined figures. Some authors claim the importance of these elements, since they can date them back to the Bronze Age. However, the date of these engravings has not been determined and could have been made in any other subsequent period.

== Gallery ==
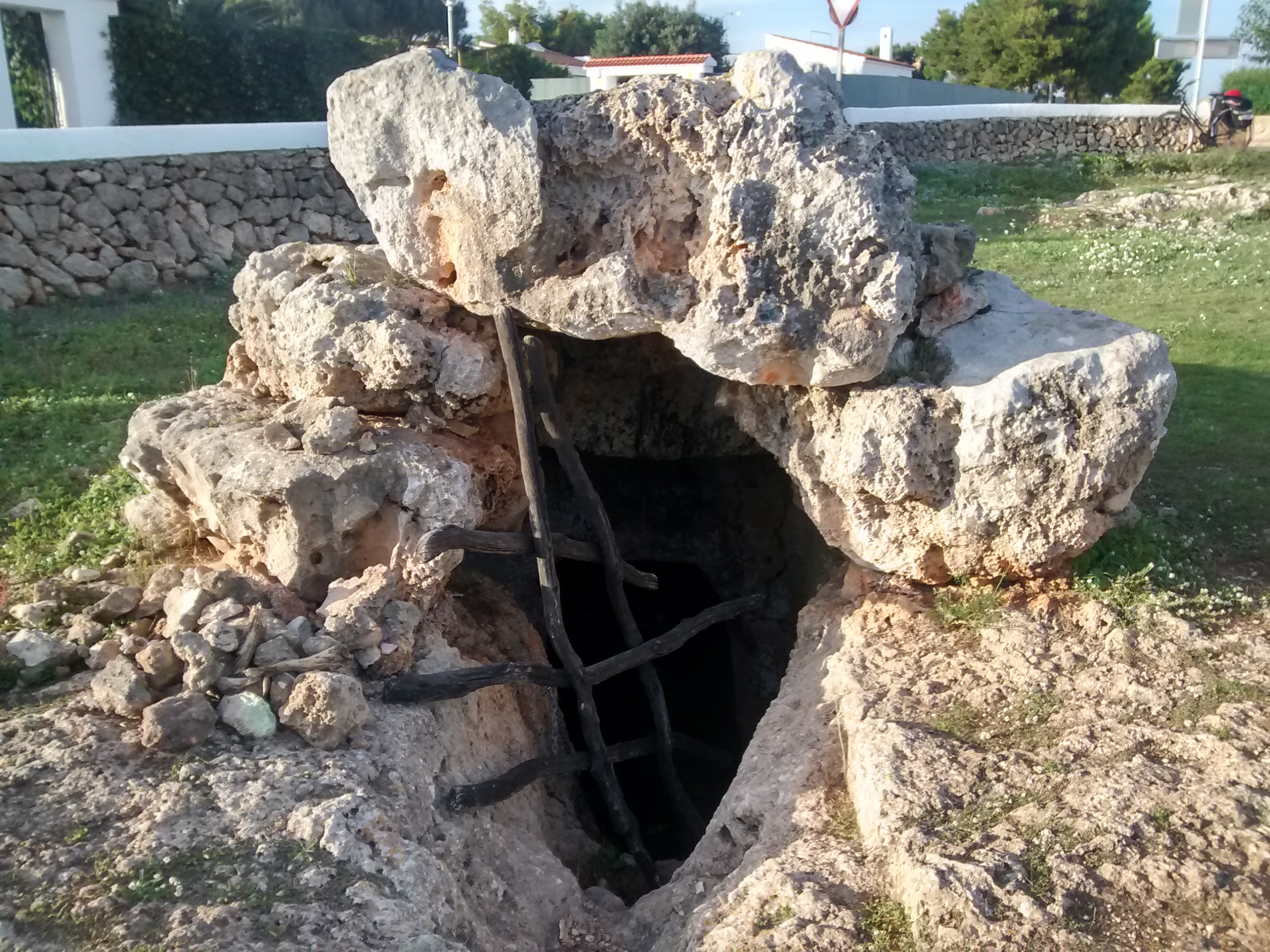
Entrance of the hypogeum

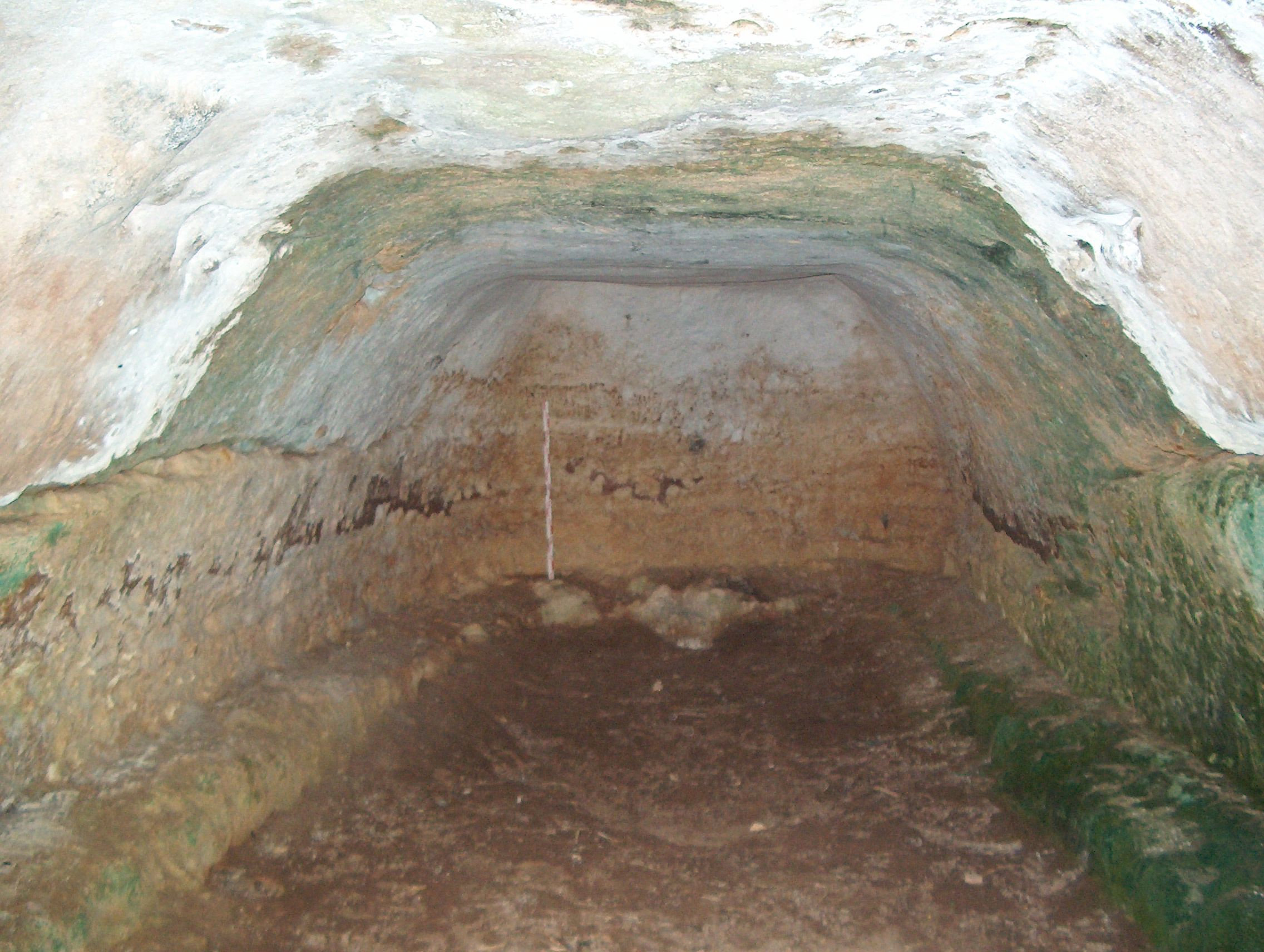
View of the chamber of the hypogeum

== Bibliography ==
- PLANTALAMOR, L. & RITA, M.C. (1982) Tres cuevas de la Edad del Bronce en la zona occidental de Menorca. Ampurias, 44: 1-16.
- VENY, C. (1976) Dos cuevas del bronce antiguo en Menorca y su influencia en las navetas. Trabajos de Prehistoria, 33: 227–248.
