= Club 15-15 =

Spanish volleyball club

Oxidoc Palma
- Full name: Club 15-15
- Founded: 1994
- Dissolved: 2012
- Ground: Municipal Germans Escalas, Palma, Majorca (Capacity: 800)
- League: Superliga
- 2011–12: Superliga, W

Club 15-15 was a women's professional volleyball team based in Palma, Majorca, Spain.

== History ==
The club was found in 1994 as Icaro Volleyball Club, from Palma, Majorca, Balearic Islands, being promoted to the National First Division in 2001 and Liga FEV in 2005.

After the 2006/2007 season, the team earned the Superliga spot in 2007, winning the Liga FEV promotion playoff.

The next season, the first in Superliga, the team moved from Alaró to Palma, changing the name to Ícaro Palma.

For the 2008/2009 season the team merged with the male team Club Voleibol Portol, for economical reasons, playing both under the Palma Volley name.

Since the 2009/2010 season, the team uses Oxidoc Palma' as team name.

The club was disbanded in December 2011, due to huge financial constraints.

== Names evolution ==
- 1994-2006 Club Voleibol Ícaro
- 2006-2007 Ícaro Alaró
- 2007-2008 Ícaro Palma
- 2008-2009 Palma Volley
- 2009–2012 Oxidoc Palma

== Notable players ==
- (Azerbaijan) Natalya Mammadova
- (Bulgaria) Antonina Zetova
- (Dominican Republic) Milagros Cabral
- (Italy) Maurizia Cacciatori
- (Puerto Rico) Áurea Cruz
- (Serbia) Iva Pejkovic
- (Spain) Susana Rodríguez
- (Venezuela) Desiree Glod

== Palmares ==
- 2007 FEV Cup Champions
- 2007 FEV League Champions
