= Superliga 2 Femenina de Voleibol =

Superliga Femenina 2
- Current season, competition or edition: 2017–18 Superliga 2 Femenina de Voleibol
- Sport: women's volleyball
- No. of teams: Two groups of 12 each
- Country: Spain
- Most recent champion: Arona Tenerife Sur (2016–17)
- Level on pyramid: 2
- Promotion to: Superliga
- Relegation to: Primera División
- Website: rfevb.com

The Superliga 2 de Voleibol Femenina (SF-2), is the second category league of Spanish Volleyball, under the Superliga Femenina de Voleibol. The administration of the league is carried out by the Real Federación Española de Voleibol.

== Champions by year ==
Season	Champion	Runners-up
2007–08	Haro Rioja Voley	Cantabria Infinita
2008–09	Ribeira Sacra	Playa de Finestrat
2009–10	Cantabria Infinita	Promociones Díez Rical
2010–11	Nuchar Eurochamp Murillo	Voley Murcia
2011–12	GH Ecay Leadernet	CVB-Barça
2012–13	Vall d'Hebron	Feel Volley Alcobendas
2013–14	Emevé Elide	CV Torrelavega
2014–15	Fígaro Haris Tenerife	VP Madrid
2015–16	DSV Sant Cugat	None
2016–17	Arona Tenerife Sur	Cajasol Juvasa
2017–18		

== See also ==
- Superliga Femenina de Voleibol
- Superliga de Voleibol Masculina
- Superliga 2 de Voleibol Masculina
