= Severus of Menorca =

Spanish bishop (5th century)

Severus of Menorca was a bishop on the island of Menorca in the early 5th century. According to the Epistula Severi (Letter on the Conversion of the Jews written by Severus of Menorca) Severus was at the forefront of a mass conversion where most of the Jewish population on the island converted to Christianity in 418 C.E. The Epistula Severi explains that the relationship between the Jews and the Christians on the island grew tense when relics of St. Stephen arrived on the island approximately a year before the conversion began. It took eight days to convert the Jewish population to Christianity and, in that time, the synagogue on the island was burnt to the ground and 540 Jews were converted.

== Authenticity of the Epistula Severi ==
Cardinal Baronius initially published the letter in 1594. However, it was not until 1752 that it underwent its first scrutiny by R. P. Ludovici Du Mesnil. He, like many scholars after him, was skeptical of the paper's authenticity. Some scholars of the era claimed the letter was a "willful distortion or even an outright forgery". Even today, some scholars doubt the letter's authenticity. A more recent scholar who believes the text is a forgery is Bernhard Blumenkranz. Blumenkranz believes the text was written in the 7th century, arguing that the "atmosphere of physical intimidation" towards the Jews was common in 7th century Spain. Furthermore, Blumenkranz mentions that the 7th century was an era notorious for the production of forgeries.

On the other hand, Scott Bradbury argues against Blumenkranz, claiming that Bishop Severus of Menorca wrote the letter in 418 C.E. Bradbury explains that the person who wrote the letter was exceptionally accurate when giving dates. For example, Severus claims he arrived in Magona on Saturday the 2nd of February. It turns out that the 2nd of February was indeed a Saturday and this detail is too accurate for someone from the 7th century. Moreover, Bradbury discusses that other texts written in the 5th century allude to the Severus' letter. One of which is the De Miraculis Sancti Stephani, a "collection of [St.] Stephen's miracles" written in around 425 C.E. This document mentions the conversion of the Jews on the island of Menorca in 418 C.E., and the fact that St. Stephen's relics were monumental in the conversion. Another document supporting this theory is a letter written to St. Augustine by Consentius, which also alludes to the events on Menorca. Other scholars have given more evidence that the text was indeed written by a 7th-century Bishop. One such piece of evidence is that the anti-Semitic rhetoric Blumenkranz alludes to is "mild" in comparison to that of 7th-century writings.

== Forced conversions ==
In the 5th century, Jews in the Roman Empire were protected from violence as well as from forced conversions by the law. However, in the Epistula Severi, it seems that this is not the case as the synagogue was burned to the ground. Furthermore, one of the Jews on the island of Menorca, Galilaeus, converts to Christianity out of fear of being killed by his Christian neighbours. Severus explains that Galilaeus is not really afraid of his Christian neighbours, rather he is afraid of being sentenced to “eternal damnation” (i.e. hell) if he does not convert to Christianity. Regardless of what Severus writes, it is clear that Galilaeus felt forced to convert, which is exactly what the law tried to prevent.
