= CV Torrelavega =

Spanish volleyball club

Torrelavega
- Full name: Club Voleibol Torrelavega
- Founded: 1966
- Ground: La Habana Vieja, Torrelavega (Capacity: 700)
- Chairman: (Spain) Secundino Ordóñez
- Manager: (Spain) Álex Río
- League: Superliga 2 Femenina
- 2012–13: Superliga 2 Femenina, 11th
- Website: Club home page

Uniforms
Home	Away

Club Voleibol Torrelavega, also known as CV Cantabria Deporte for sponsorship reasons, is a Spanish women's volleyball club from Torrelavega currently playing in the Spanish second tier. Founded in 1966 in the city's Marqués de Santillana high school, it made its debut in the premier national championship in 1975 and in the next years it rose to the top positions; it was the championship's runner-up in 1977 and 1978, and in 1979 it won both the championship and the national cup, which was successfully defended the following year. It was the first team to represent Spain in the European Cup.

Torrelavega declined through the 1980s, but it remained in the premier championship until in 1999 it had to ask to be relegated for financial reasons. Its last major success was reaching its fourth cup final in 1995. In 2000 and 2008 it was promoted, but it had to renounce for the same reasons. In 2010 it finally returned to the Superliga, but after two seasons it was forced to withdraw again.

== Titles ==
- Superliga Femenina (1)
  - 1979
- Copa de la Reina (2)
  - 1979, 1980

== Season to season ==
Competition	Season	Position
Superliga 2	2013/2014	2º – promoted
Superliga 2	2012/2013	11º
Superliga	2011/2012	7º – relegated
Superliga	2010/2011	9º
Superliga 2	2009/2010	1º – promoted
Superliga 2	2008/2009	3º
Superliga 2	2007/2008	2º
Liga FEV	2006/2007	
Liga FEV	2005/2006	
Liga FEV	2004/2005	
Liga FEV	2003/2004	6º
Liga FEV	2002/2003	4º
Liga FEV	2001/2002	3º
Liga FEV	2000/2001	5º
Liga FEV	1999/2000	2º

Competition	Season	Position
Superliga	1998/1999	12º – relegated
División de Honor	1997/1998	9º
División de Honor	1996/1997	8º
División de Honor	1995/1996	9º
División de Honor	1994/1995	5º
División de Honor	1993/1994	9º
División de Honor	1992/1993	11º
División de Honor	1991/1992	9º
División de Honor	1990/1991	7º
División de Honor	1989/1990	8º
División de Honor	1988/1989	
Primera División	1987/1988	
Primera División	1986/1987	
Primera División	1985/1986	
Primera División	1984/1985	

Competition	Season	Position
Primera División	1983/1984	
Primera División	1982/1983	
Primera División	1981/1982	
Primera División	1980/1981	
Primera División	1979/1980	2º
Primera División	1978/1979	1º
Primera División	1977/1978	2º
Primera División	1976/1977	2º
Primera División	1975/1976	3º
Segunda División	1974/1975	1º
Segunda División	1973/1974	
Segunda División	1972/1973	
Segunda División	1971/1972	

== 2012-13 squad ==
- (1.84) (Spain) Ana González
- (1.84) (Spain) Aroa Sánchez
- (1.79) (Spain) Paula del Olmo
- (1.78) (Spain) María Segovia
- (1.75) (Spain) Susana García
- (1.73) (Spain) Sandra Villegas
- (1.72) (Spain) Isabel Díaz
- (1.72) (Spain) Noelia Neila
- (1.68) (Spain) Lidia Dacuiña
- (1.65) (Spain) Alba Hoyas
- (1.63) (Spain) Laura Soto
- (1.62) (Spain) Ana Salazar
