= CV Xàtiva =

Spanish volleyball club

Xàtiva
- Full name: Club Voleibol Xàtiva
- Short name: C.V. Xàtiva
- Nickname: CVX
- Founded: 1976
- Ground: Pavelló Municipal, Xàtiva (Capacity: 500)
- Chairman: Enrique Mateu
- League: Superliga 2
- 2014–15: 1ª División, 4th – promoted
- Website: www.cvxativa.com

Uniforms
Home	Away

Club Voleibol Xàtiva is a Spanish volleyball club from Xàtiva. Founded in 1976, it is best known for its women's team, which was one of the leading Spanish teams in the second half of the 1980s under the sponsorship name of CV Tormo Barberá, winning three national championships and three national cups between 1986 and 1990 including a double and representing Spain in the European Cup. However, it was withdrawn from the competition in 1991 after its internationals were requested for a year by the national federation to prepare the 1992 Summer Olympics and its sponsor lost interest in the project. It has since played at a much more modest level in the lower regional categories.

== Titles ==
- Spanish League (3)
  - 1986, 1987, 1990
- Spanish Cup (3)
  - 1987, 1988, 1989
