= Esther Rodríguez =

Spanish volleyball player (born 1982)

Personal information
- Nationality: Spanish
- Born: 2 February 1982 (age 44)
- Height: 172 cm (68 in)
- Weight: 62 kg (137 lb)
- Spike: 270 cm (106 in)
- Block: 265 cm (104 in)

Volleyball information
- Position: libero
- Number: 18 (national team)

Career
Years	Teams
2007	CAV Murcia 2005

National team
2007	Spain

Esther Rodríguez (born 2 February 1982) is a Spanish female former volleyball player, playing as a libero. She was part of the Spain women's national volleyball team.

She competed at the 2007 Women's European Volleyball Championship. On club level she played for CAV Murcia 2005 in 2007.
