= CV Tenerife =

Spanish volleyball club

Tenerife
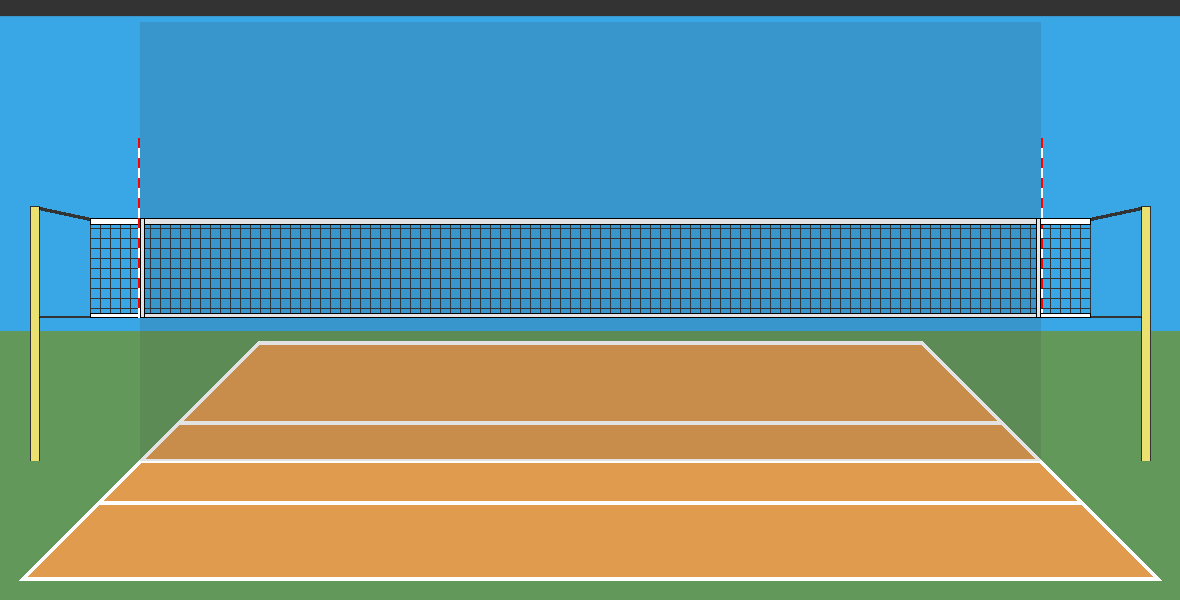
- Full name: Club Voleibol Tenerife
- Founded: 1981
- Dissolved: 2011
- Ground: Santiago Martín, Tenerife, Canary Islands, Spain (Capacity: 5,100)
- 2010–11: Superliga, 6th
- Website: Club home page

Club Voleibol Tenerife a.k.a. tubillete.com Tenerife Marichal was a Spanish volleyball club that played their home matches at the Pabellón Insular Santiago Martín hall in Tenerife.

The team participated in the Women's CEV Champions League 2007-08. They won the CEV Champions League competition in 2003-04, the only Spanish team ever to do so.

== Titles ==
- Superliga Femenina (10)
  - 1992, 1997, 1998, 1999, 2000, 2001, 2002, 2004, 2005, 2006
- Copa de la Reina (11)
  - 1991, 1997, 1998, 1999, 2000, 2001, 2002, 2003, 2004, 2005, 2006
- Supercopa de España (5)
  - 2002, 2003, 2004, 2005, 2008
- CEV Champions League (1)
  - 2003–04

== Previous names ==
- 2001-2005 Tenerife Marichal
- 2006-2008 Spar Tenerife Marichal
- 2008–2009 tubillete.com Tenerife Marichal
- 2009–2011 Fígaro Peluqueros Tenerife

== Notable players ==
- (Russia) Elena Godina
- (Cuba) Magaly Carvajal
- (Cuba) Ana Ivis Fernández
- (Italy) Maurizia Cacciatori
- (Italy) Anna Vania Mello
- (Netherlands) Ingrid Visser
- (Kazakhstan) Yelena Pavlova
- (Belgium) Virginie De Carne
- (Serbia) Mira Golubović
- (Serbia) Suzana Ćebić
- (United States) Logan Tom
- (Poland) Milena Rosner
- (Turkey) Neslihan Demir
- (Spain) Goya Dorta
- (Spain) Yasmina Hernández
- (Spain) Esther López
