= CAV Murcia 2005 =

Spanish volleyball club

- Full name: Club Atlético Voleibol Murcia 2005
- Founded: 2005
- Dissolved: 2011
- Ground: Príncipe de Asturias, Murcia, Spain (Capacity: 5,000)
- 2010–11: Superliga, 2nd

Uniforms
Home	Away

Club Atlético Voleibol Murcia 2005, also known for sponsorship reason as Grupo 2002 Murcia, was a Spanish volleyball club based in Murcia that played their home matches at the Pabellón Príncipe de Asturias.

The team participated in the Women's CEV Champions League 2007-08.

The football section club's is CF Atlético Ciudad.

== Titles ==
- Superliga Femenina (3)
  - 2007, 2008 & 2009
- Copa de la Reina (5)
  - 2007, 2008, 2009, 2010, 2011
- Supercopa de España (4)
  - 2006, 2007, 2009, 2010
- CEV Top Teams Cup (1)
  - 2006–07

== Notable players ==
- (Brazil) Fofão (2007–2008)
- (Brazil) Walewska Oliveira (2007–2008)
- (Brazil) Jaqueline Carvalho (2007–2008)
- (Brazil) Fernanda Venturini (2006–2007)
- (Poland) Malgorzata Glinka (2006–2008)
- (Russia) Lioubov Sokolova (2006–2007)
- (United States) Nancy Metcalf (2006–2007)
- (United States) Kim Willoughby (2006–2007)
- (Belgium) Frauke Dirickx (2005–2007)
- (Netherlands) Ingrid Visser (2009–2011)
- (Cuba) Ana Ivis Fernández (2009–2010)
- (Dominican Republic) Annerys Vargas (2006–2007)
- (Dominican Republic) Prisilla Rivera (2006–2011)
