= RCD Espanyol Voleibol =

Real Club Deportivo Espanyol Voleibol was a Spanish women's volleyball club from Barcelona. It was founded as CPAR Cornellá, and was absorbed by RCD Espanyol in 1982 after it won its first double. It was one of the leading Spanish teams in the 1980s, winning five national leagues and six national cups between 1980 and 1992 and representing Spain in European Volleyball Confederation competitions. It was disbanded in 1993.

In March 2017, the Association of Supporters and Shareholders of RCD Espanyol boosted a project for recovering the sporting sections of the club, but this time without any economic link with the football team. The new multi-sports club was created with the name of Seccions Deportives Espanyol (Sporting sections Espanyol). Despite it was planned the volleyball section would start only playing in youth categories during the 2017–18 season, finally a women's senior team would compete in the regional Catalan third division.

== Titles ==
- Superliga Femenina (3)
  - 1985, 1988, 1991
- Copa de la Reina (5)
  - 1984, 1985, 1986, 1990, 1992
- Supercopa de España (1)
  - 1990

== Notable players ==
- (Peru) María del Risco
