= Copa de la Reina de Voleibol =

Spanish women's volleyball competition

- Sport: Volleyball
- Founded: 1976
- No. of teams: 6
- Country: Spain
- Most recent champion: Fundación Cajasol Andalucía (2026)
- Broadcasters: Teledeporte; RTVE Play; TV Canaria
- Website: RFEVB

Copa de la Reina de Voleibol is the second most important competition of female volleyball in Spain. Inaugural edition was played in 1976. It's hosted by Real Federación Española de Voleibol.

Top six teams at half-season in Superliga Femenina play the Copa de la Reina, being played generally on February.

== Winners by year ==
Year	Winners	Region
1976	Hispano Francès	(Catalonia)
1977	Medina de Madrid	(Community of Madrid)
1978	Longchamps	(Asturias)
1979	Sniace	(Cantabria)
1980	Sniace	(Cantabria)
1981	Sant Cugat	(Catalonia)
1982	Cornellà	(Catalonia)
1983	Hispano Francès	(Catalonia)
1984	RCD Espanyol	(Catalonia)
1985	RCD Espanyol	(Catalonia)
1986	RCD Espanyol	(Catalonia)
1987	Tormo Barberá	(Valencian Community)
1988	Tormo Barberá	(Valencian Community)
1989	Tormo Barberá	(Valencian Community)
1990	RCD Espanyol	(Catalonia)
1991	Afelsa Los Compadres	(Canary Islands)
1992	RCD Espanyol	(Catalonia)
1993	Telyco Alcorcón	(Community of Madrid)
1994	Alcorcón	(Community of Madrid)
1995	Caja Ávila	(Castile and León)
1996	Albacete	(Castilla–La Mancha)
1997	Construcciones Marichal	(Canary Islands)
1998	Construcciones Marichal	(Canary Islands)
1999	Construcciones Marichal	(Canary Islands)
2000	Construcciones Marichal Airtel	(Canary Islands)
2001	Marichal Airtel	(Canary Islands)

Year	Winners	Region
2002	Marichal Tenerife	(Canary Islands)
2003	Tenerife	(Canary Islands)
2004	Tenerife Marichal	(Canary Islands)
2005	Tenerife Marichal	(Canary Islands)
2006	Tenerife Marichal	(Canary Islands)
2007	Grupo 2002 Murcia	(Region of Murcia)
2008	Grupo 2002 Murcia	(Region of Murcia)
2009	Murcia 2005	(Region of Murcia)
2010	Murcia 2005	(Region of Murcia)
2011	Murcia 2005	(Region of Murcia)
2012	Haro Rioja Voley	(La Rioja)
2013	Haro Rioja Voley	(La Rioja)
2014	Embalajes Blanco Tramek Murillo	(La Rioja)
2015	Naturhouse Ciudad de Logroño	(La Rioja)
2016	Naturhouse Ciudad de Logroño	(La Rioja)
2017	Figaro Peluqueros Haris	(Canary Islands)
2018	Minis de Arluy Logroño	(La Rioja)
2019	Minis de Arluy Logroño	(La Rioja)
2020	May Deco VB Logroño	(La Rioja)
2021	Feel Volley Alcobendas	(Community of Madrid)
2022	Sanaya Libby's La Laguna	(Canary Islands)
2023	Sanaya Libby's La Laguna	(Canary Islands)
2024	Hidramar Gran Canaria	(Canary Islands)
2025	Avarca de Menorca	(Balearic Islands)
2026	Fundación Cajasol Andalucía	(Andalusia)

== Wins by teams ==
Team	Titles	Years
(Canary Islands) Tenerife Marichal	11	1991, 1997, 1998, 1999, 2000, 2001, 2002, 2003, 2004, 2005, 2006
(La Rioja) May Deco VB Logroño	6	2014, 2015, 2016, 2018, 2019, 2020
(Catalonia) RCD Espanyol	5	1984, 1985, 1986, 1990, 1992
(Region of Murcia) Murcia 2005	5	2007, 2008, 2009, 2010, 2011
(Valencian Community) Tormo Barberá	3	1987, 1988, 1989
(Canary Islands) Sanaya Libby's La Laguna	3	2017, 2022, 2023
(Catalonia) Hispano Francès	2	1976, 1983
(Cantabria) Sniace	2	1979, 1980
(Community of Madrid) Alcorcón	2	1993, 1994
(La Rioja) Haro Rioja Voley	2	2012, 2013
(Community of Madrid) Club Medina	1	1977
(Asturias) Longchamps	1	1978
(Catalonia) Sant Cugat	1	1981
(Catalonia) Cornellà	1	1982
(Castile and León) Caja Ávila	1	1995
(Castilla–La Mancha) Albacete	1	1996
(Community of Madrid) Feel Volley Alcobendas	1	2021
(Canary Islands) Hidramar Gran Canaria	1	2024
(Balearic Islands) Avarca de Menorca	1	2025
(Andalusia) Fundación Cajasol Andalucía	1	2026

== See also ==
- Superliga Femenina de Voleibol
- Supercopa de España de Voleibol Femenino
