= CD Iruña Voley =

Spanish volleyball club

GH Leadernet Navarcable
- Full name: Club Deportivo Iruña Voleibol
- Founded: 2007
- Ground: Pabellón Universitario, Pamplona (Capacity: 3,000)
- Chairman: Rafael Hernández
- Manager: José María Rodríguez
- League: Superliga Femenina
- 2015–16: Superliga Femenina, 5th
- Website: Club home page

Uniforms
Home	Away

Club Deportivo Iruña Voley is a professional women's volleyball team based in Pamplona, Navarre, Spain. It played in Superliga Femenina. It serves as the volley section of CD Iruña.

== History ==
Iruña Voley was promoted to Superliga in 2012 and re-signed to the league in 2016.

== Season to season ==
Competition	Season	Position
Superliga	2015/2016	5th in regular season, Supercopa runners-up
Superliga	2014/2015	2nd in regular season, runners-up in championship playoff
Superliga	2013/2014	2nd in regular season, runners-up in championship playoff
Superliga	2012/2013	5th
Superliga 2	2011/2012	1st – Promotion to Superliga
Liga FEV	2010/2011	1st – All matches won. – Promotion to Superliga 2
Primera División	2009/2010	1st – All matches won. – Promotion to Liga FEV
Segunda División	2008/2009	2nd – Promotion to Primera División
Primera División Vasca	2007/2008	2nd – Promotion to Segunda División

== 2013–14 season squad ==
#	Name	DoB	Height	Nat.	Position
1.	Silvia Bedmar	January 3, 1989 (age 37)	1.80 m (5 ft 11 in)	(Spain)	Wing-spiker
3.	Jaione Esain	November 22, 1993 (age 32)	1.58 m (5 ft 2 in)	(Spain)	Wing-spiker
5.	Sandra Rojas	July 7, 1984 (age 42)	1.58 m (5 ft 2 in)	(Spain)	Libero
7.	Sandra Cegarra	April 15, 1986 (age 40)	1.75 m (5 ft 9 in)	(Spain)	Wing-spiker
8.	Sandra Stocker	December 26, 1987 (age 38)	1.87 m (6 ft 2 in)	(Switzerland)	Middle-blocker
9.	Marta Fraile	October 30, 1982 (age 43)	1.77 m (5 ft 10 in)	(Spain)	Setter
10.	Soraya Fraga	July 17, 1979 (age 47)	1.83 m (6 ft 0 in)	(Brazil)	Opposite
11.	Marcelinha	December 1, 1987 (age 38)	1.78 m (5 ft 10 in)	(Brazil)	Setter
12.	Carlota García	February 21, 1992 (age 34)	1.89 m (6 ft 2 in)	(Spain)	Middle-blocker
14.	Elena Fernández	February 1, 1991 (age 35)	1.62 m (5 ft 4 in)	(Spain)	Libero
16.	Martina Fraňková	December 23, 1982 (age 43)	1.84 m (6 ft 0 in)	(Czech Republic)	Wing-spiker
17.	Jessica González	January 22, 1987 (age 39)	1.87 m (6 ft 2 in)	(Spain)	Middle-blocker
