= Centro Insular de Deportes =

Indoor arena in Las Palmas, Spain

- CID, La Roca (The rock)
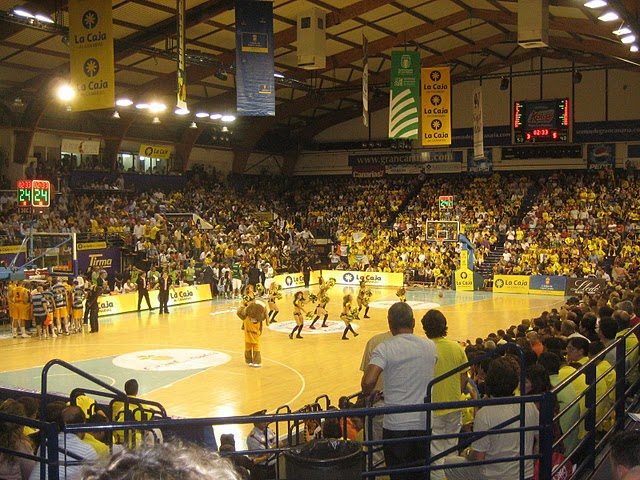
- Gran Canaria's Centro Insular de Deportes (CID) on May 19, 2009
- Interactive map of Centro Insular de Deportes
- Full name: Centro Insular de Deportes
- Location: José Alcalde Ramírez Bethencourt Av., Las Palmas de Gran Canaria, Spain
- Coordinates: 28.113°N 15.417°W
- Owner: Las Palmas de Gran Canaria City
- Capacity: Basketball: 5,200
- Surface: Parquet
- Scoreboard: Yes
- Field size: 25m x 16.65m

Construction
- Opened: October 20, 1988

Tenants
- Hotel Cantur (SFV) Jusán Canarias (SVM) Gran Canaria (ACB) Colegios Arenas G.C. (1ª División CBA (LEB Plata): 1988– 1988– 1988–2014; 2013– 2014–

Website
- Website

Centro Insular de Deportes is an indoor arena in Las Palmas, Spain. It was the home arena of the Spanish ACB League professional basketball team Gran Canaria until 2014. The arena holds 5,200 people.
