= CV Alcobendas =

Spanish volleyball club

Feel Volley Alcobendas
- Full name: Club Voleibol Alcobendas
- Founded: 2000
- Ground: Pabellón Luis Buñuel, Alcobendas (Capacity: 100)
- Chairman: (Argentina) Fabián Muller
- Manager: (Spain) Guillermo Falasca
- League: Superliga Femenina
- 2015–16: Superliga Femenina, 4th
- Website: Club home page

Club Voleibol Alcobendas also known as CV Alcobendas is a Spanish Women's Volleyball Club from Alcobendas in Madrid. Founded since the year of 2000, The Club currently plays in the Superliga Femenina de Voleibol.

== Honours ==
- Superliga Femenina 2
  - Runners Up : 2012–13

== 2015–16 Season Squad ==
- Head coach : (Spain) Guillermo Falasca

No	Name	Date of Birth	Height	Weight	Position
01.	(Spain) Sara Mendoza	November 11, 1998 (age 27)	1.70 m (5 ft 7 in)	68 kg (150 lb)	
02.	(Spain) Elsa Van Hulst	October 1, 1998 (age 28)	1.78 m (5 ft 10 in)	70 kg (150 lb)	
03.	(Spain) Patricia Rodríguez	January 3, 1995 (age 31)	1.68 m (5 ft 6 in)	64 kg (141 lb)	Libero
04.	(Spain) Andrea de Aranzadi	June 12, 1997 (age 29)	1.85 m (6 ft 1 in)	76 kg (168 lb)	
06.	(Spain) Sofía Elízaga	October 5, 1995 (age 31)	1.80 m (5 ft 11 in)	74 kg (163 lb)	
06.	(Spain) Ana Corredoyra	April 30, 1997 (age 29)	1.68 m (5 ft 6 in)	66 kg (146 lb)	Libero
07.	(Spain) Blanca Fdez-Cuesta	July 29, 1997 (age 29)	1.80 m (5 ft 11 in)	70 kg (150 lb)	
09.	(Spain) Adriana Alonso	April 17, 2000 (age 26)	1.70 m (5 ft 7 in)	65 kg (143 lb)	
09.	(United States) Tessa Leaea	January 6, 1992 (age 34)	1.91 m (6 ft 3 in)	76 kg (168 lb)	
11.	(Spain) Alicia de Blas	May 7, 1995 (age 31)	1.82 m (6 ft 0 in)	75 kg (165 lb)	
12.	(Spain) María Álvarez	September 1, 1995 (age 31)	1.76 m (5 ft 9 in)	70 kg (150 lb)	
14.	(Spain) Mar Calvo	October 8, 1998 (age 28)	1.79 m (5 ft 10 in)	71 kg (157 lb)	
16.	(Spain) Lúa Melina	February 20, 1995 (age 31)	1.68 m (5 ft 6 in)	64 kg (141 lb)	
18.	(Spain) Esther Rodríguez	February 2, 1982 (age 44)	1.72 m (5 ft 8 in)	62 kg (137 lb)	
