= CV Las Palmas =

Spanish volleyball club

Ciudad Las Palmas G.C. Cantur
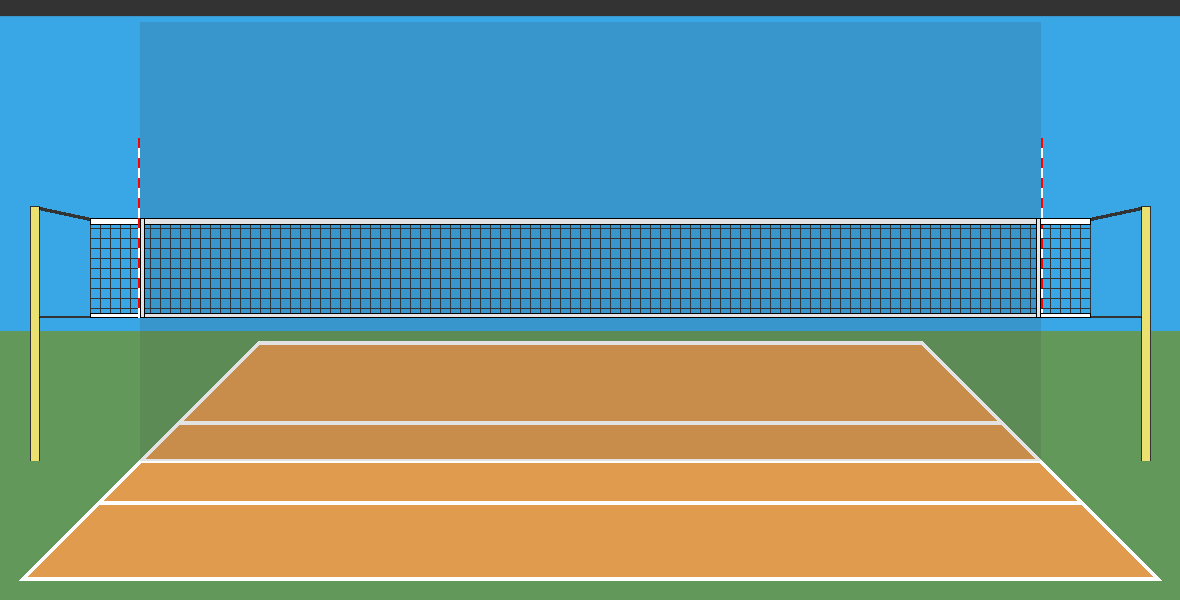
- Full name: Club Voleibol Las Palmas
- Founded: 1976
- Dissolved: 2010
- Ground: Centro Insular, Las Palmas, Canary Islands, Spain (Capacity: 5,000)
- 2009–10: Superliga, 11th

Uniforms
| Home | Away |

Club Voleibol Las Palmas akas Hotel Cantur Las Palmas was a Spanish volleyball club which is playing their home matches at the Centro Insular de Deportes in Las Palmas. The team participated in the Women's CEV Champions League 2006-07

Club Voleibol J.A.V. Olímpico is the name of the women's volleyball team that now represents Las Palmas in the Superliga Femenina de Voleibol.

== Previous names ==
- 2002–2006 Hotel Cantur Las Palmas
- 2006–2008 Gran Canaria Hotel Cantur
- 2008–2011 Ciudad Las Palmas G.C. Cantur
