= Murillo de Río Leza =

- Municipality
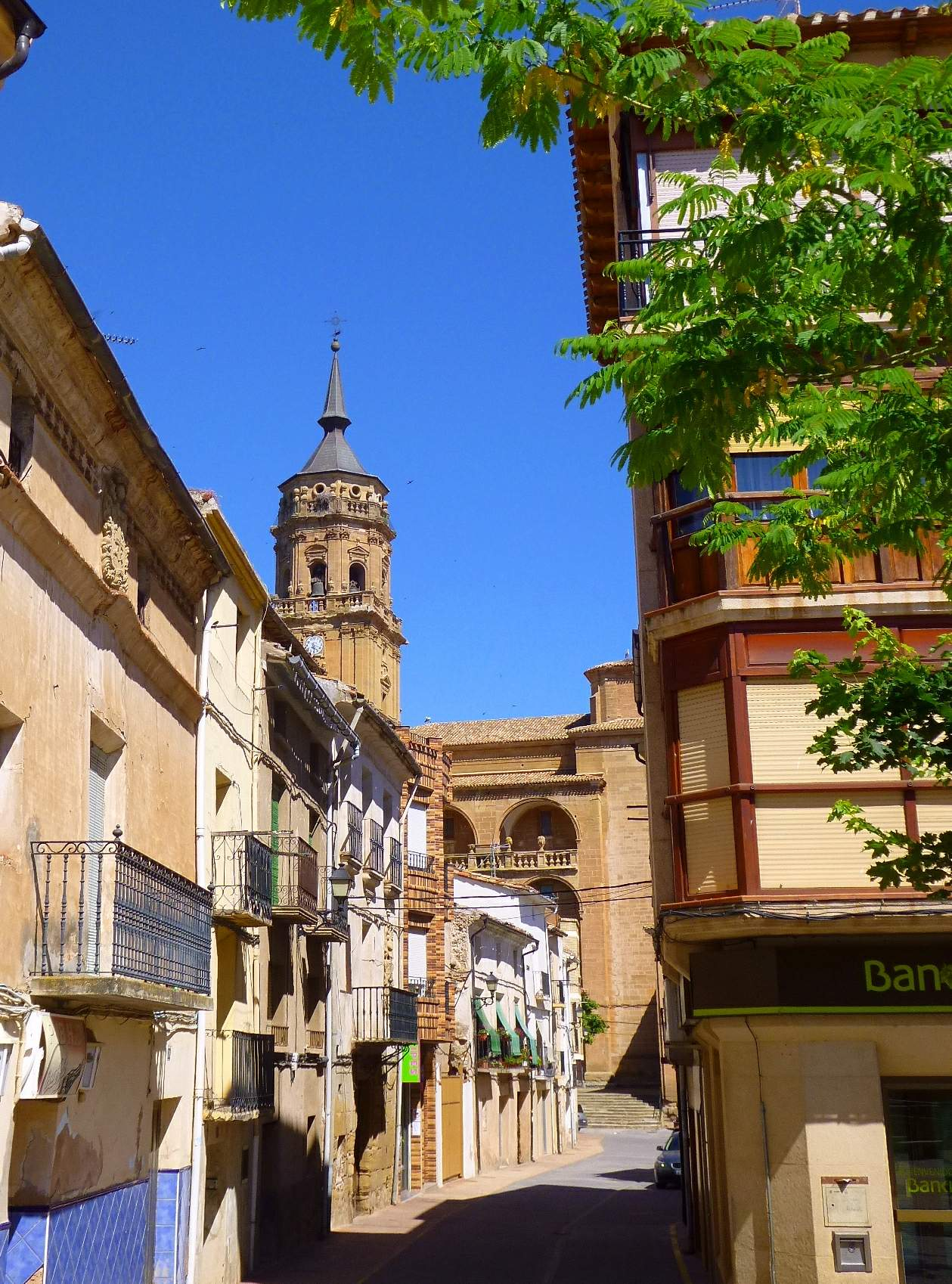
- Main square

- Coat of arms

- Location within La Rioja, Spain Location within Spain
- Coordinates: 42°24′10″N 2°19′28″W
- Country: Spain
- Autonomous community: La Rioja
- Comarca: Comarca de Logroño

Government
  - Mayor: José Ángel Lacalzada Esquivel (PSOE)

Area
  - Total: 46.06 km^{2} (17.78 sq mi)
- Elevation: 411 m (1,348 ft)

Population (2025-01-01)
  - Total: 1,656
- Postal code: 26143
- Website: Official website

Murillo de Río Leza is a village in the province and autonomous community of La Rioja, Spain. The municipality covers an area of 46.06 square kilometres (17.78 sq mi) and as of 2011 had a population of 1835 people.
