= Nerea Sánchez =

Spanish-Chilean footballer

Personal information
- Full name: Nerea Sánchez Millán
- Date of birth: 2 December 2004 (age 21)
- Place of birth: Madrid, Spain
- Position: Midfielder

Team information
- Current team: Eibar
- Number: 8

Youth career
- 2018–2019: Madrid CFF
- 2019–2021: Atlético Madrid

Senior career*
Years	Team	Apps	(Gls)
2021–2022	Atlético Madrid C		
2022–2024	Atlético Madrid B		
2024–2025	Madrid CFF B	26	(4)
2025–2026	Madrid CFF	18	(1)
2026–	Eibar	0	(0)

International career^{‡}
2023	Spain U19	2	(0)
2025–	Chile	1	(1)
- * Club domestic league appearances and goals as of 19 July 2026 ‡ National team caps and goals as of 11 October 2026

Nerea Sánchez Millán (born 2 December 2004) is a Spanish-Chilean professional footballer who plays as a midfielder for Liga F club Eibar.

== Club career ==
Born in Madrid, Spain, Sánchez was with Madrid CFF before joining the Atlético Madrid youth ranks. She represented Atlético Madrid C in the 2021–22 Primera Nacional and the next two seasons she played for Atlético Madrid B, winning the 2022–23 Segunda Federación.

In 2024, Sánchez switched to Madrid CFF and represented the B-team in the 2024–25 Segunda Federación. She made her debut with the A-team in the last matchday of the 2024–25 Liga F. In August 2025, she renewed for three seasons.

In July 2026, Sánchez signed with Eibar for two seasons.

== International career ==
In March 2023, Sánchez represented Spain at under-19 level in the La Nucía International Tournament Women U19, facing Sweden and the Netherlands.

Due to her Chilean heritage, Sánchez switched to the Chile national team and made her debut in the 2–3 away win against Catalonia on 1 June 2025.

Sánchez made her official debut with Chile in the 7–0 home victory against Bolivia on 11 October 2026, scoring a penalty goal.

== Personal life ==
Sánchez was born in Spain to a Spanish father and a Chilean mother. His mother, Valeria Millán, moved to Spain alongside her family at the age of 12 due to the 1973 Chilean coup d'état and is cousin of Alejandra Millán, the mother of the Chile international footballers Pablo and Thomas Galdames and the Mexican-Chilean footballer Benjamín Galdames.
