= Arroyo de la Luz =

- Location of Arroyo de la Luz within Spain Location of Arroyo de la Luz within Extremadura
- Country: Spain
- Autonomous community: Extremadura
- Province: Cáceres
- Comarca: Tajo-Salor
- Municipality: Arroyo de la Luz

Area
  - Total: 12 km^{2} (4.6 sq mi)
- Elevation: 352 m (1,155 ft)

Population (2025-01-01)
  - Total: 5,495
  - Density: 460/km^{2} (1,200/sq mi)
- Time zone: UTC+1 (CET)
  - Summer (DST): UTC+2 (CEST)

Arroyo de la Luz (Spanish: [aˈroʝo ðe la ˈluθ]) is a municipality located in the province of Cáceres, Extremadura, Spain. According to the 2005 census (INE), the municipality has a population of 6,607 inhabitants.

It was put on lockdown by regional president Guillermo Fernández Vara in March 2020 during the COVID-19 pandemic in Spain, with 15 reported cases of COVID-19.

== See also ==
- List of municipalities in Cáceres
