= Pabellón Universitario de Navarra =

Arena in Pamplona, Spain

Coordinates: 42.7964359°N 1.6292328°W

- Interactive map of Pabellón Universitario de Navarra
- Full name: Pabellón Universitario de Navarra
- Owner: Government of Navarre
- Capacity: 3,000
- Surface: Parquet Floor

Construction
- Opened: 2000

Tenants
- Portland San Antonio (2000–2013); Xota FS (2000–2012); Basket Navarra Club (2016–present)

Pabellón Universitario de Navarra is an arena in Pamplona, Spain. It is primarily used for team handball and is the home arena of MRA Navarra FS and Basket Navarra Club. The arena holds 3,000 people.
