= CV Haro =

Spanish volleyball club

Haro Rioja Voley
- Full name: Club Voleibol Haro
- Founded: 1996
- Ground: El Ferial, Haro (Capacity: 800)
- Chairman: Manuel Berdegué
- Manager: José Miguel Pérez
- League: Superliga Femenina
- 2015–16: Superliga Femenina, 3rd
- Website: Club home page

Uniforms
Home	Away

Club Voleibol Haro, also known as Haro Rioja Voley, is a Spanish volleyball club from Haro in La Rioja. Founded in 1996, it is best known for its women's team, which has played in the Superliga since 2008. In 2012, it won the national cup and supercup, and it was the championship's runner-up.

== Titles ==
- Superliga Femenina (1)
  - 2012–13
- Copa de la Reina (2)
  - 2012, 2013
- Supercopa (1)
  - 2012

== Season to season ==
Competition	Season	Position
Superliga	2015/2016	3rd
Superliga	2014/2015	10th
Superliga	2013/2014	6th
Superliga	2012/2013	1st - Champions / Copa de la Reina winners / Supercopa winners
Superliga	2011/2012	Runners-up / Copa de la Reina winners
Superliga	2010/2011	5th
Superliga	2009/2010	5th
Superliga	2008/2009	8th
Superliga 2	2007/2008	1st - Promotion to Superliga / Copa de la Princesa winners
Liga FEV	2006/2007	1st - Promotion to Superliga 2
Liga FEV	2005/2006	
Liga FEV	2004/2005	
Liga FEV	2003/2004	
Primera División	2002/2003	Promotion to Liga FEV
Segunda División	2001/2002	Promotion to Primera División
Segunda División	2000/2001	
Segunda División	1999/2000	

== 2013–14 season squad ==
#	Name	DoB	Height	Nat.	Position
2.	Silvia Araco	August 12, 1989 (age 37)	1.77 m (5 ft 10 in)	(Spain)	Setter
3.	Kelly Williamson	May 16, 1990 (age 36)	1.87 m (6 ft 2 in)	(United States)	Wing-spiker
4.	Ane Cengotitabengoa	September 21, 1997 (age 28)	1.78 m (5 ft 10 in)	(Spain)	Wing-spiker
5.	María Barrasa	March 14, 1995 (age 31)	1.80 m (5 ft 11 in)	(Spain)	Setter
7.	Eliana González	January 27, 1997 (age 29)	1.70 m (5 ft 7 in)	(Spain)	Libero
8.	Deede Harrison	February 11, 1990 (age 36)	1.90 m (6 ft 3 in)	(United States)	Middle-blocker
9.	Rosalía Alonso-Mañero	July 17, 1989 (age 37)	1.89 m (6 ft 2 in)	(Spain)	Middle-blocker
10.	Amelia Portero	May 28, 1995 (age 31)	1.78 m (5 ft 10 in)	(Spain)	Wing-spiker
12.	Aída Etxebarría	March 23, 1995 (age 31)	1.75 m (5 ft 9 in)	(Spain)	Wing-spiker
15.	Aitana Ballingha	September 25, 1986 (age 39)	1.78 m (5 ft 10 in)	(Spain)	Opposite
