= CV Ciutadella =

Spanish volleyball club

Avarca Menorca
- Full name: Club Voleibol Ciutadella
- Founded: 1985
- Ground: Pavelló Municipal, Ciutadella
- Chairman: Cati Moll
- Manager: Bep Llorens
- League: Superliga Femenina
- 2015–16: Superliga Femenina, 7th
- Website: Club home page

Uniforms
Home	Away

Club Voleibol Ciutadella, also known as Avarca Menorca for sponsorship reasons, is a Spanish volleyball club from Ciutadella de Menorca in the Balearic Islands. Founded in 1985 merge of the teams of several local schools, it is best known for its women's team, which was promoted to the Superliga in 2006, and soon became one of the leading teams in the championship. In 2009 it was third, in 2010 it was the runner-up and in 2011 and 2012 it won the championship.

== Titles ==
- Spanish League (2)
  - 2011, 2012
- Supercopa de España (1)
  - 2020

== 2013–14 season squad ==
#	Name	DoB	Height	Nat.	Position
1.	Esperanza Pons	June 27, 1980 (age 45)	1.76 m (5 ft 9 in)	(Spain)	Wing-spiker
3.	Sheila d'Amaro	October 20, 1982 (age 43)	1.85 m (6 ft 1 in)	(Brazil) / (Spain)	Wing-spiker
4.	Raquel Brun	September 17, 1993 (age 32)	1.80 m (5 ft 11 in)	(Spain)	Wing-spiker
7.	Ana Maldonado	September 13, 1994 (age 31)	1.74 m (5 ft 9 in)	(Spain)	Setter
8.	Danira Costa	January 7, 1992 (age 34)	1.80 m (5 ft 11 in)	(Spain)	Setter
9.	María Elisa Gener	June 20, 1985 (age 40)	1.63 m (5 ft 4 in)	(Spain) / (Argentina)	Libero
10.	Esther Marqués	June 3, 1978 (age 47)	1.76 m (5 ft 9 in)	(Spain)	Middle-blocker
11.	Irene Cano	April 23, 1985 (age 41)	1.89 m (6 ft 2 in)	(Spain)	Middle-blocker
13.	Therese McNatt	June 10, 1979 (age 46)	1.85 m (6 ft 1 in)	(United States)	Opposite
17.	Gracieli do Monte	November 17, 1990 (age 35)	1.83 m (6 ft 0 in)	(Brazil)	Wing-spiker
