= CV Aguere =

Spanish volleyball club

Aguere
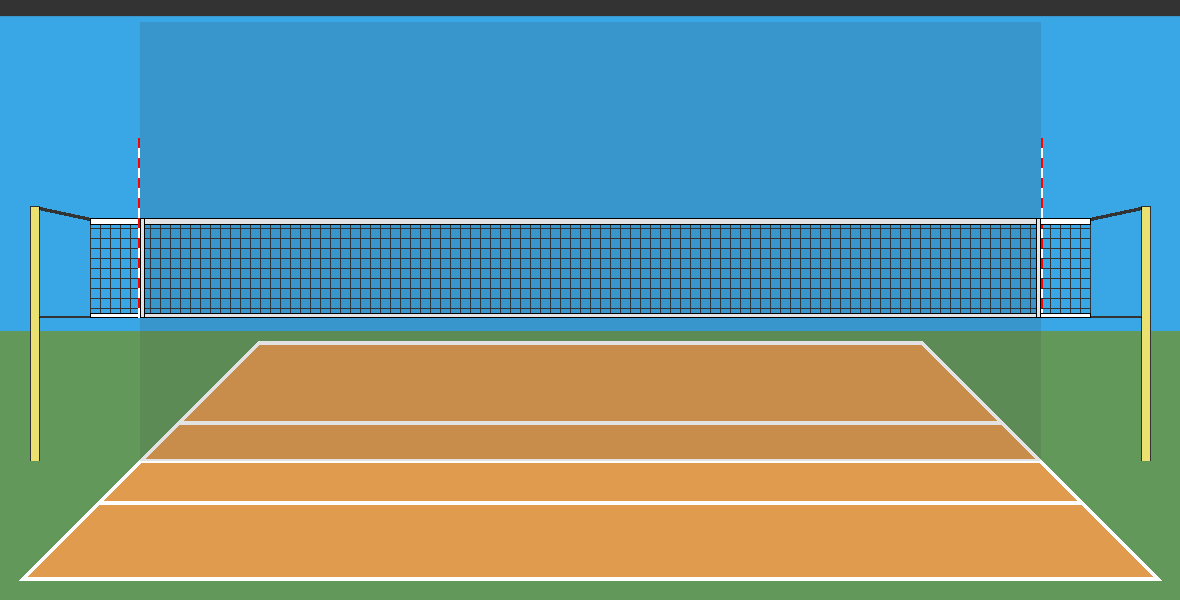
- Full name: Club Voleibol Aguere
- Nickname: La Laguna
- Founded: 1992
- Ground: Juan Ríos Tejera Pavilion, San Cristóbal de La Laguna, Canary Islands (Capacity: 3,200)
- Chairman: (Spain) Ambrosio González
- Manager: (Spain) Ambrosio González
- League: Superliga Femenina
- 2015–16: Superliga Femenina, 8^{th}

Club Voleibol Aguere is a professional volleyball team based in San Cristóbal de La Laguna, Spain. It plays in the Superliga Femenina de Voleibol.

== History ==
The team was found in 1992.

In the 2009/2010 season the team achieve the League Championship for the first time.

== Honours ==
- Superliga Femenina (1)
  - 2009–10
- Copa de la Reina (0)
  - Runners-up: 2007

== 2013–14 season squad ==
#	Name	DoB	Height	Nat.	Position
2.	Dulce Gestoso	March 29, 1995 (age 29)		(Spain)	Wing-spiker
3.	Mihaela Chavdarova	April 20, 1995 (age 29)	1.82 m (6 ft 0 in)	(Bulgaria)	Opposite
4.	Nira Pérez	November 1, 1984 (age 40)	1.68 m (5 ft 6 in)	(Spain)	Libero
5.	"Atani" Cabrera	November 2, 1987 (age 37)	1.82 m (6 ft 0 in)	(Spain)	Middle-blocker
7.	Marina Dubinina	August 28, 1969 (age 55)	1.88 m (6 ft 2 in)	(Ukraine)	Middle-blocker
8.	Marina Oliva	April 29, 1997 (age 27)		(Spain)	Middle-blocker
9.	Beatriz Fagundo	July 2, 1992 (age 32)	1.70 m (5 ft 7 in)	(Spain)	Libero
10.	Viviane Cordobés	August 23, 1996 (age 28)	1.70 m (5 ft 7 in)	(Spain)	Middle-blocker
11.	Alicia Fernández	June 22, 1991 (age 33)	1.68 m (5 ft 6 in)	(Spain)	Setter
12.	Natalia Kvasnytsya	June 7, 1978 (age 46)	1.81 m (5 ft 11 in)	(Ukraine)	Wing-spiker
14.	Lara Palenzuela	September 27, 1998 (age 26)		(Spain)	Opposite
15.	Romina Lamas	August 28, 1978 (age 46)	1.84 m (6 ft 0 in)	(Argentina)	Setter
16.	Arkía El-Ammari	October 9, 1976 (age 48)	1.75 m (5 ft 9 in)	(Spain)	Wing-spiker
