= Superliga Femenina de Voleibol =

Top level of women's volleyball in Spain

Superliga Femenina
- Current season, competition or edition: 2025–26 Superliga Femenina de Voleibol
- Sport: Volleyball
- Founded: 1969
- No. of teams: 12
- Country: Spain
- Most recent champion: Fundación Cajasol Andalucía (1st title)
- Most titles: CV Tenerife, 10 titles
- Broadcasters: LaLiga+, RFEVB streaming
- Level on pyramid: 1
- Relegation to: Superliga 2
- Domestic cup: Copa de la Reina
- Website: rfevb.com

The Superliga Femenina de Voleibol (SFM) is the top level of women's volleyball in Spain. The championship was founded in 1989. The administration of the league is carried out by the Real Federación Española de Voleibol. Formerly known as 1ª División de la Liga Nacional Femenina de Voleibol, and, since 1989 as the current name.

== Competition format ==
9 teams played in a two-round format. Upon completion of regular season, the top four teams play Championship's playoffs, while the bottom team is relegated to Superliga 2.

During regular season, a win by 3–0 or 3–1 means 3 points to winner team, while a 3–2 win, 2 points for winner team & 1 for loser team.

Championship playoffs is played to best of 3 games.

== Champions by season ==
Season	Champion
1970	Medina de Barcelona
1971	Medina de Madrid
1972	Medina de Gijón
1973	Medina de Madrid
1974	Medina de Barcelona
1975	Medina de Barcelona
1976	Medina de Gijón
1977	Medina de Madrid
1978	Longchamps–Medina
1979	Sniace
1980	Cornellà
1981	Academia Preuniversitaria
1982	Cornellà
1983	Norte Real Arquitectura
1984	Arquitectura
1985	RCD Espanyol–Verte
1986	Tormo Barberá
1987	Tormo Barberá
1988	RCD Espanyol–Verte

Season	Champion
1989	Aperitivos Medina
1990	Tormo Barberá
1991	RCD Espanyol
1992	Afelsa Los Compadres
1993	Murcia
1994	Murcia
1995	Murcia
1996	Albacete
1997	Construcciones Marichal
1998	Construcciones Marichal
1999	Construcciones Marichal
2000	Construcciones Marichal Airtel
2001	Marichal Airtel Tenerife
2002	Tenerife Marichal
2003	Hotel Cantur Costa Mogán
2004	Tenerife Marichal
2005	Tenerife Marichal
2006	Spar Tenerife Marichal
2007	Grupo 2002 Murcia

Season	Champion
2008	Grupo 2002 Murcia
2009	Grupo 2002 Murcia
2010	Jamper Aguere
2011	Valeriano Allès Menorca
2012	Valeriano Allès Menorca
2013	Haro Rioja Voley
2014	Embalajes Blanco Tramek Murillo
2015	Naturhouse Ciudad de Logroño
2016	Naturhouse Ciudad de Logroño
2017	Naturhouse Ciudad de Logroño
2018	Minis de Arluy VB Logroño
2019	Minis de Arluy VB Logroño
2020	Season suspended due to COVID-19
2021	CCO 7 Palmas
2022	Sanaya Libby's La Laguna
2023	Hidramar Gran Canaria
2024	Hidramar Gran Canaria
2025	Heidelberg Volkswagen
2026	Fundación Cajasol Andalucía

=== Titles by team ===
Team	# Titles	Season
(Canary Islands) Tenerife	10	1992, 1997, 1998, 1999, 2000, 2001, 2002, 2004, 2005, 2006
(La Rioja) Murillo Logroño	6	2014, 2015, 2016, 2017, 2018, 2019
(Canary Islands) Hidramar Gran Canaria	3	2021, 2023, 2024
(Region of Murcia) Murcia 2005	3	2007, 2008, 2009
(Region of Murcia) Murcia	3	1993, 1994, 1995
(Catalonia) RCD Espanyol	3	1985, 1988, 1991
(Valencian Community) Tormo Barberá	3	1986, 1987, 1990
(Asturias) Medina de Gijón	3	1972, 1976, 1978
(Community of Madrid) Medina de Madrid	3	1971, 1973, 1977
(Catalonia) Medina de Barcelona	3	1970, 1974, 1975
(Balearic Islands) Valeriano Allès Menorca	2	2011, 2012
(Community of Madrid) Arquitectura	2	1983, 1984
(Catalonia) Cornellà	2	1980, 1982
(Andalusia) Fundación Cajasol Andalucía	1	2026
(Canary Islands) Heidelberg Volkswagen	1	2025
(Canary Islands) Haris La Laguna	1	2022
(La Rioja) Haro Rioja Voley	1	2013
(Canary Islands) Jamper Aguere	1	2010
(Canary Islands) Las Palmas	1	2003
(Castilla–La Mancha) Albacete	1	1996
(Community of Madrid) Aperitivos Medina	1	1989
(Andalusia) Academia Preuniversitaria	1	1981
(Cantabria) Sniace	1	1979

== See also ==
- Copa de la Reina de Voleibol
- Supercopa de España de Voleibol Femenino
