= Ciutadella de Menorca =

Municipality in the Balearic Islands, Spain

- Municipality
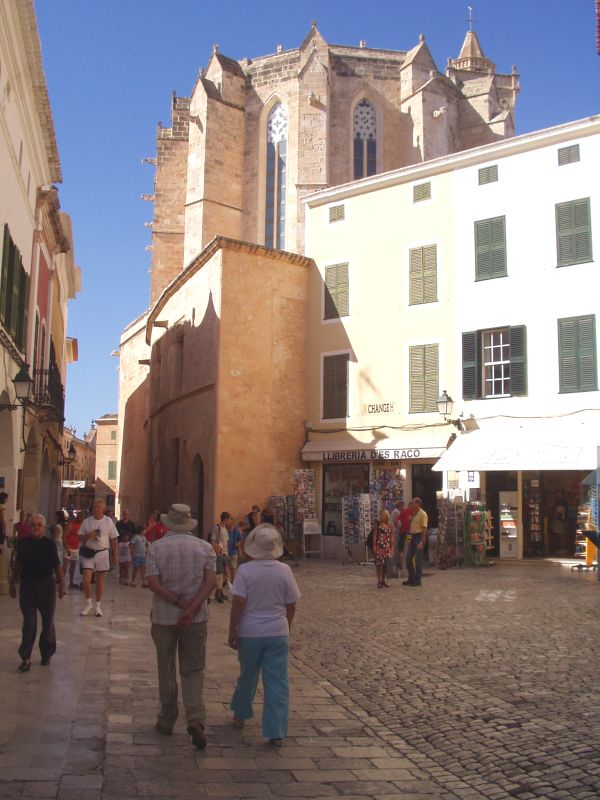

- Coat of arms
- Interactive map of Ciutadella de Menorca
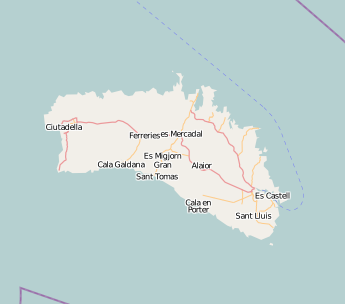
- Location within Minorca Location within Balearic Islands Location within Spain
- Coordinates: 40°01′N 3°49′E
- Country: Spain
- Autonomous community: Balearic Islands
- Province: Balearic Islands
- Island: Minorca
- Judicial district: Ciutadella

Government
  - Mayor of Ciutadella: Joana Mari Pons (2023-) (PP)

Area
  - Total: 186.34 km^{2} (71.95 sq mi)
- Elevation: 24 m (79 ft)

Population (2025-01-01)
  - Total: 32,431
  - Density: 174.04/km^{2} (450.77/sq mi)
- Time zone: UTC+1 (CET)
  - Summer (DST): UTC+2 (CEST)
- Postal code: 07760, 07769

Ciutadella de Menorca (Balearic Catalan: [siwtəˈðeʎə ðə məˈnɔɾkə]), or simply Ciutadella, is a town and a municipality in the western end of Menorca, one of the Balearic Islands (Spain). It is one of the two primary cities in the island, along with Mahón.

== History ==
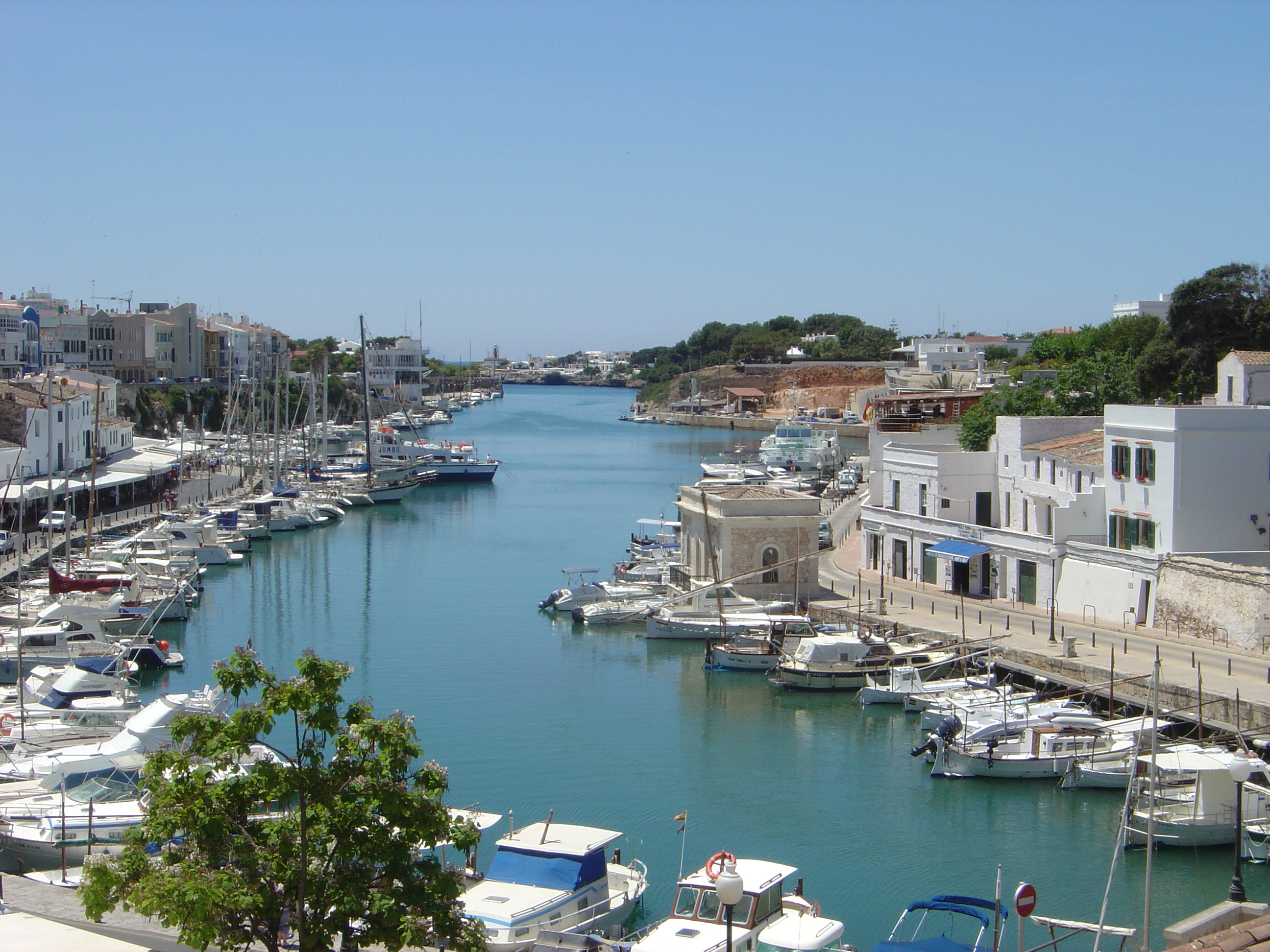
Port of Ciutadella

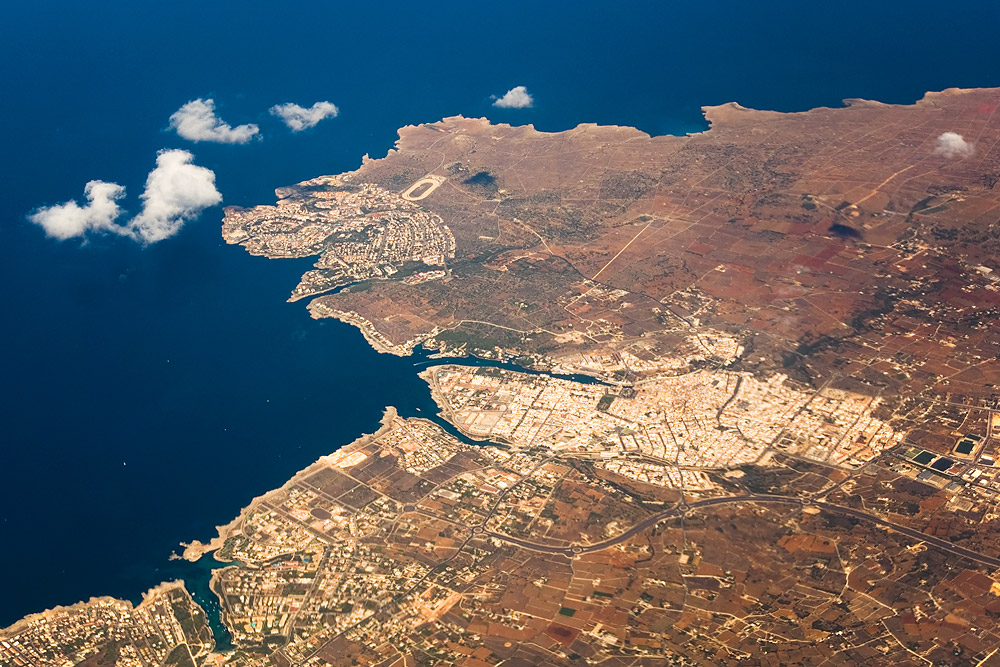
Ciutadella from the air

The earliest known human activity in the area dates to 2000 BC. Talaiots were constructed in the area around 1400 BC. A necropolis in the area was used from the pre-talaiot culture to the 100s AD.

Ciutadella de Menorca was founded by Ancient Carthage under the name Jamma and was one of three fortified towns on Menorca. The area was renamed to Lammona after the Romans conquered it in 123 BC.

The town became Medina Menurqa after being conquered by Muslims in 903 and was the only city on the island due to the decline of Mahón. The Crown of Aragon conquered the area in 1287. James II of Majorca had walls constructed and expanded for the town in 1303, and these existed until demolition occurred starting in 1868.

In 1558, the area was raided by the Ottoman Empire. An obelisk was set up in the 19th century by Josep Quadrado in the Plaza d'es Born in memory of the offensive, with the following inscription:

Here we fought until death for our religion and our country in the year 1558

Every year on July 9, a commemoration takes place in Ciutadella, remembering "l'Any de sa Desgràcia", or "the Year of the Disaster".

The War of the Spanish Succession resulted in Great Britain gaining control over Menorca and the area was under British control for almost a century. The General Chanzy, a French steamboat, sunk off the coast of the town on 9 February 1910, and killed all but one of its 170 passengers. The Punta Nati Lighthouse was constructed in response to this event.

== Geography and climate ==
Ciutadella de Menorca has a Hot-summer Mediterranean climate (Köppen: Csa) with mild, somewhat humid winters and dry, hot summers. Autumn is the wettest season and heavy rain is not uncommon during this season.

Climate data for Ciutadella de Menorca, 1981-2010 normals
Month	Jan	Feb	Mar	Apr	May	Jun	Jul	Aug	Sep	Oct	Nov	Dec	Year
Mean daily maximum °C (°F)	14.5 (58.1)	14.7 (58.5)	16.6 (61.9)	18.7 (65.7)	22.4 (72.3)	26.6 (79.9)	29.8 (85.6)	30.1 (86.2)	26.9 (80.4)	23.2 (73.8)	18.4 (65.1)	15.5 (59.9)	21.5 (70.6)
Daily mean °C (°F)	11.1 (52.0)	11.1 (52.0)	12.7 (54.9)	14.6 (58.3)	18.1 (64.6)	22.1 (71.8)	25.1 (77.2)	25.6 (78.1)	22.8 (73.0)	19.5 (67.1)	15.1 (59.2)	12.3 (54.1)	17.5 (63.5)
Mean daily minimum °C (°F)	7.7 (45.9)	7.5 (45.5)	8.8 (47.8)	10.5 (50.9)	13.8 (56.8)	17.5 (63.5)	20.4 (68.7)	21.1 (70.0)	18.6 (65.5)	15.8 (60.4)	11.7 (53.1)	9.1 (48.4)	13.5 (56.4)
Average rainfall mm (inches)	41.6 (1.64)	44.8 (1.76)	30.1 (1.19)	34.7 (1.37)	30.1 (1.19)	9.8 (0.39)	3.3 (0.13)	18.5 (0.73)	53.6 (2.11)	64.5 (2.54)	69.4 (2.73)	55.5 (2.19)	455.9 (17.97)
Source: World Meteorological Organization

== Notable people ==
- Aina Moll Marquès (1930-2019), philologist and politician
- Albert Torres (1990-), track and road racing cyclist
- Severus of Menorca, bishop

== Sister cities ==
- Córdoba, Argentina, Argentina
- Oristano, Italy, since 1991
- Long Beach Island, New Jersey, United States, since 2012

== See also ==
- List of municipalities in Balearic Islands

== Works cited ==
- "Ciutadella: la ciutat antiga". Ciutadella de Menorca. Archived from the original on 6 July 2025.
- "Far de Punta Nati". Ciutadella de Menorca.
- "Història i cultura de l'illa". Ciutadella de Menorca. Archived from the original on 6 July 2025.
- "La muralla de Ciutadella". Ciutadella de Menorca. Archived from the original on 6 July 2025.
- "Necròpolis de Cala Morell". Ciutadella de Menorca. Archived from the original on 6 July 2025.
