= CV Logroño =

Spanish volleyball club

Club Voleibol Logroño
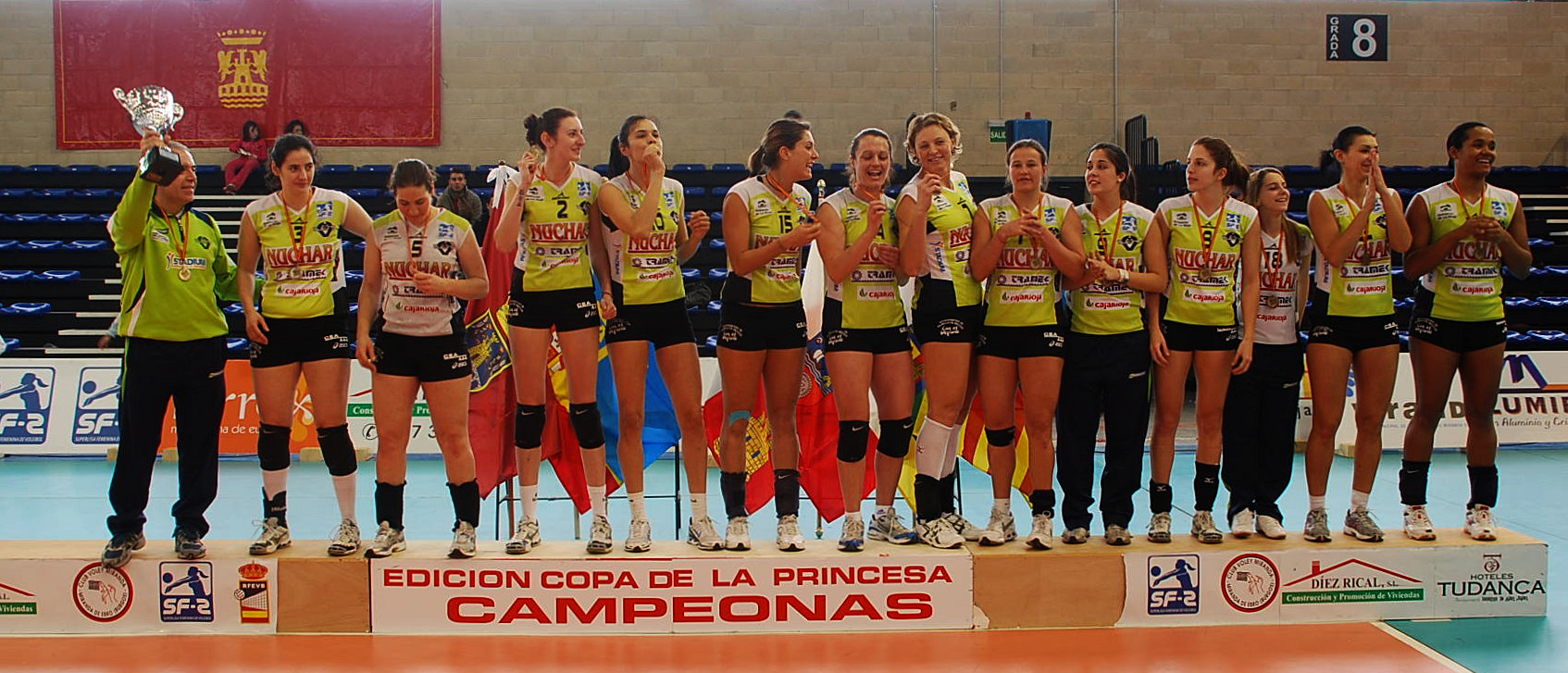
- Full name: Club Voleibol Logroño
- Founded: 2004
- Ground: CDM Lobete, Logroño, La Rioja (Capacity: 980)
- Chairman: (Spain) Carlos Arratia
- Manager: (Spain) Manuel Berenguel
- League: Superliga Femenina
- 2018–19: Superliga Femenina, 1st

Uniforms
Home	Away

Club Voleibol Logroño is a professional Volleyball team based in Logroño, La Rioja, Spain. It plays in Superliga Femenina.

== Achievements ==
- 2020 Copa de la Reina winners
- 2019 Supercopa winners
- 2018–19 Superliga Femenina winners
- 2019 Copa de la Reina winners
- 2018 Supercopa winners
- 2017–18 Superliga Femenina winners
- 2018 Copa de la Reina winners
- 2017 Supercopa winners
- 2016–17 Superliga Femenina winners
- 2015–16 Superliga Femenina winners
- 2016 Copa de la Reina winners
- 2015 Supercopa winners
- 2014–15 Superliga Femenina winners
- 2015 Copa de la Reina winners
- 2014 Supercopa winners
- 2013–14 Superliga Femenina winners
- 2014 Copa de la Reina winners
- 2013 Supercopa winners
- 2012–2013 Superliga Femenina runners-up
- 2009–2010 Winner of Copa Princesa
- 2009–2010 Spanish Superliga 2: 3rd. Place
- 2008–2009 Liga FEV: 2nd. Place
- 2007–2008 Spanish Second Division: 1st. Place

== Season to season ==
Competition	Season	Position
Superliga	2019/2020	– in regular season / championship playoffs – / Supercopa – / Copa de la Reina winners
Superliga	2018/2019	1st in regular season / championship playoffs champions / Supercopa champions / Copa de la Reina winners
Superliga	2017/2018	1st in regular season / championship playoffs champions / Supercopa champions / Copa de la Reina winners
Superliga	2016/2017	1st in regular season / championship playoffs champions / Supercopa champions / Copa de la Reina runners-up
Superliga	2015/2016	1st in regular season / championship playoffs champions / Supercopa and Copa de la Reina winners
Superliga	2014/2015	1st in regular season / championship playoffs champions / Supercopa and Copa de la Reina winners
Superliga	2013/2014	1st in regular season / championship playoffs champions / Supercopa and Copa de la Reina winners
Superliga	2012/2013	2nd in regular season / Lost in Final of championship playoffs
Superliga	2011/2012	2nd in regular season / Lost in quarter-finals of championship playoffs
Superliga 2	2010/2011	1st in Superliga 2 / Promotion to Superliga. All matches won.
Superliga 2	2009/2010	3rd in Superliga 2 / Copa de La Princesa winners.
Liga FEV	2008/2009	2nd – Promotion to Superliga 2
Segunda División	2007/2008	Promotion to Liga FEV.
Segunda División	2006/2007	
Segunda División	2005/2006	
