= 2009 FIVB Women's World Grand Champions Cup squads =

This article shows all participating team squads at the 2009 FIVB Women's World Grand Champions Cup, held from November 10 to November 15, 2009 in Tokyo and Fukuoka, Japan.

== Brazil ==
- Head coach: José Roberto Guimarães

#	Name	Date of birth	Height	Weight	Spike	Block
2	Ana Tiemi	26.10.1987	187	74	295	284
3	Danielle Lins (c)	05.01.1985	181	68	290	276
4	Paula Pequeno	22.01.1982	184	74	302	285
5	Caroline Gattaz	27.07.1981	191	87	304	280
6	Thaisa Menezes	15.05.1987	196	79	316	301
7	Marianne Steinbrecher	23.08.1983	188	70	310	290
8	Adenizia da Silva	18.12.1986	185	63	312	290
9	Natalia Pereira	24.04.1989	183	76	300	288
10	Welissa Gonzaga	09.09.1982	179	76	300	287
11	Joyce Silva	13.06.1984	190	67	311	294
13	Sheilla Castro	01.07.1983	185	64	302	284
14	Fabiana de Oliveira	07.03.1980	169	59	276	266

== Dominican Republic ==
- Head coach: Marcos Kwiek

#	Name	Date of birth	Height	Weight	Spike	Block
1	Annerys Vargas	07.08.1981	194	70	325	315
2	Dahiana Burgos	07.04.1985	188	58	312	302
3	Lisvel Elisa Eve	10.09.1991	189	70	250	287
5	Brenda Castillo	05.06.1992	167	55	220	270
6	Carmen Rosa Caso	29.11.1981	168	59	243	241
7	Niverka Marte	19.10.1990	178	71	233	283
8	Cándida Arias	11.03.1992	191	68	295	301
10	Milagros Cabral (c)	17.10.1978	181	63	308	305
11	Jeoselyna Rodríguez	09.12.1991	184	63	242	288
12	Karla Echenique	16.05.1986	181	62	279	273
14	Prisilla Rivera	29.12.1984	186	70	312	308
17	Altagracia Mambrú	21.01.1986	180	55	330	315

== Italy ==
- Head coach: Massimo Barbolini

#	Name	Date of birth	Height	Weight	Spike	Block
2	Cristina Barcellini	20.11.1986	185	64	307	292
3	Immacolata Sirressi	19.05.1990	174	63	284	260
5	Giulia Rondon	16.10.1987	189	77	304	280
8	Jenny Barazza	24.07.1981	188	77	300	285
10	Paola Cardullo	18.03.1982	162	56	275	268
11	Serena Ortolani	07.01.1987	187	63	308	288
12	Francesca Piccinini	10.01.1979	180	75	304	279
13	Valentina Arrighetti	26.01.1985	185	62	294	280
14	Eleonora Lo Bianco (c)	22.12.1979	172	70	287	273
15	Antonella Del Core	05.11.1980	180	73	296	279
16	Lucia Bosetti	09.07.1989	176	59	306	286
17	Simona Gioli	17.09.1977	185	72	307	283

== Japan ==
- Head coach: Masayoshi Manabe

#	Name	Date of birth	Height	Weight	Spike	Block
1	Megumi Kurihara	31.07.1984	186	69	305	285
3	Yoshie Takeshita	18.03.1978	159	52	280	270
4	Kaori Inoue	21.10.1982	182
6	Yuko Sano	26.07.1979	159	54	260	250
9	Mizuho Ishida	22.01.1988
10	Yuki Shoji	19.11.1981	182	66	315	303
11	Erika Araki (c)	03.08.1984	186	79	307	298
12	Saori Kimura	19.08.1986	184	66	298	293
15	Koyomi Tominaga	01.05.1989
17	Mai Yamaguchi	03.07.1983	176
18	Maiko Sakashita
19	Kanari Hamaguchi	29.08.1985	167

== South Korea ==
- Head coach: Hoa-suk Ryu

#	Name	Date of birth	Height	Weight	Spike	Block
2	Yeum Hye-seon	03.02.1991
4	Kim Sa-nee (c)	21.06.1981	182	75	302	292
5	Kim Hae-ran	16.03.1984	168	60	280	270
6	Oh Hyun-mi	15.03.1986	175
7	Yoon Hye-suk	19.06.1983	174
10	Kim Yeon-koung	26.02.1988
12	Hwang Youn-joo	13.08.1986	177
13	Park Jeong-ah	26.03.1993
14	Yang Hyo-jin	14.12.1989	190	64	287	280
15	Kim Se-young	04.06.1981	190	71	309	300
17	Lee Bo-lam	08.08.1988
19	Kim Hee-jin	29.04.1991

== Thailand ==
- Head coach: Kiattipong Radchatagriengkai

#	Name	Date of birth	Height	Weight	Spike	Block
1	Wanna Buakaew	02.01.1981	172	54	292	277
5	Pleumjit Thinkaow	09.11.1983	180	63	298	281
6	Onuma Sittirak	13.06.1986	175	72	304	285
8	Utaiwan Kaensing	07.09.1988	189	86	310	295
10	Wilavan Apinyapong (c)	06.06.1984	174	68	294	282
11	Amporn Hyapha	19.05.1985	180	70	301	290
12	Kamonporn Sukmak	29.02.1988	174	63	285	275
13	Nootsara Tomkom	07.07.1985	169	57	289	278
15	Malika Kanthong	08.01.1987	177	63	292	278
17	Wanitchaya Luangtonglang	08.10.1992	175	51	295	280
18	Em-orn Phanusit	25.03.1988	179	70	302	291
19	Tapaphaipun Chaisri	29.11.1989	168	60	295	276
