= 2007–08 CEV Women's Champions League =

- League: CEV Women's Champions League
- Sport: Volleyball

CEV Women's Champions League seasons
- ← 2006–07 2008–09 →

The 2007–2008 Women's CEV Champions League was an international volleyball club competition for elite clubs throughout Europe.

== Teams of the 2007–2008 ==
Participants:

	Country	The number of teams	Teams		
1	Italy	3	Asystel Novara	Sirio Perugia	Vini Monteschiavo Jesi
2	Turkey	3	Eczacibasi Istanbul	Fenerbahce Istanbul	Türk Telekom Ankara
3	Russia	2	Zarechie Odintsovo	Dynamo Moscow	
4	France	2	RC Cannes	ASPTT Mulhouse	
5	Spain	2	Grupo 2002 Murcia	Spar Tenerife Marichal	
6	Poland	2	Winiary Kalisz	Farmutil Pila	
7	Croatia	1	ŽOK Rijeka		
8	Netherlands	1	Dela Martinus Amstelveen		
9	Azerbaijan	1	Azerrail Baku		
10	Serbia	1	Postar 064 Beograd		
11	Austria	1	Post Schwechat		
12	Switzerland	1	Voléro Zürich		

== Format ==
=== Regular season ===
20 teams take part in this phase. The teams are put in 5 group of 4 teams each. The first two teams and the best third will play the Play-off 12 teams. If the organizer of the final four is qualified, another best third will advance.

=== Play-off 12 teams ===
A draw will fix the opponents of the matches. A knock-out stage determine the 6 teams that will advance to the Play-off 6 teams.

=== Play-off 6 teams ===
Another knock-out stage determine the other 3 teams that will play the final four.

=== Final four ===
The culminating stage of the Champions league in which the four remaining teams play a semifinal match and the winners of those advance to the final. The losers play in a third-place playoff. The team which is victorious in the final will be Champions league champion.

== Group stage ==
=== Pool A ===
			Matches		Sets			Set points		
#	Team	Pts	Won	Lost	Won	Lost	Ratio	Won	Lost	Ratio
1	(Italy) Vini Monteschiavo Jesi	11	5	1	15	7	2.143	522	469	1.113
2	(Poland) Farmutil Pila	10	4	2	13	9	1.444	485	483	1.004
3	(France) RC Cannes	9	3	3	14	9	1.556	530	463	1.145
4	(Croatia) ZOK Rjieka	6	0	6	1	18	0.056	355	477	0.744

November 27, 2007
RC Cannes (France)	3 – 0	(Croatia) ZOK Rjieka	(25–20, 25–16, 25–19)
November 29, 2007
Farmutil Pila (Poland)	1 – 3	(Italy) Vini Monteschiavo Jesi	(29–27, 22–25, 13–25, 18–25)
December 5, 2007
ZOK Rjieka (Croatia)	1 – 3	(Poland) Farmutil Pila	(20–25, 15–25, 28–26, 20–25)
Vini Monteschiavo Jesi (Italy)	3 – 2	(France) RC Cannes	(25–20, 25–22, 22–25, 20–25, 17–15)
December 12, 2007
Vini Monteschiavo Jesi (Italy)	3 – 0	(Croatia) ZOK Rjieka	(25–18, 25–19, 25–12)
December 13, 2007
Farmutil Pila (Poland)	3 – 2	(France) RC Cannes	(25–23, 22–25, 26–24, 17–25, 15–13)
December 18, 2007
RC Cannes (France)	3 – 0	(Poland) Farmutil Pila	(25–13, 25–18, 25–16)
December 19, 2007
ZOK Rjieka (Croatia)	0 – 3	(Italy) Vini Monteschiavo Jesi	(22–25, 22–25, 24–26)
January 23, 2008
Farmutil Pila (Poland)	3 – 0	(Croatia) ZOK Rjieka	(25–19, 25–14, 25–18)
January 24, 2008
RC Cannes (France)	1 – 3	(Italy) Vini Monteschiavo Jesi	(25–23, 19–25, 23–25, 21–25)
January 29, 2008
ZOK Rjieka (Croatia)	0 – 3	(France) RC Cannes	(22–25, 13–25, 14–25)
Vini Monteschiavo Jesi (Italy)	0 – 3	(Poland) Farmutil Pila	(18–25, 22–25, 22–25)

=== Pool B ===
			Matches		Sets			Set points		
#	Team	Pts	Won	Lost	Won	Lost	Ratio	Won	Lost	Ratio
1	(Russia) Zarechie Odintsovo	12	6	0	18	5	3.600	539	429	1.256
2	(Poland) Winiary Kalisz	10	4	2	14	11	1.273	545	515	1.058
3	(Turkey) Fenerbahce Istanbul	7	1	5	9	15	0.600	502	523	0.960
4	(Azerbaijan) Azerrail Baku	7	1	5	7	17	0.412	443	562	0.788

November 28, 2007

Zarechie Odintsovo (Russia)
3 – 0
(Azerbaijan) Azerrail Baku
(25–5, 25–18, 25–8)

Fenerbahce Istanbul (Turkey)
0 – 3
(Poland) Winiary Kalisz
(19–25, 21–25, 16–25)
December 4, 2007

Winiary Kalisz (Poland)
2 – 3
(Russia) Zarechie Odintsovo
(18–25, 18–25, 25–16, 25–22, 10–15)

Azerrail Baku (Azerbaijan)
3 – 2
(Turkey) Fenerbahce Istanbul
(25–17, 31–29, 16–25, 21–25, 15–12)
December 11, 2007

Azerrail Baku (Azerbaijan)
2 – 3
(Poland) Winiary Kalisz
(25–23, 20–25, 18–25, 25–19, 8–15)
December 12, 2007

Zarechie Odintsovo (Russia)
3 – 0
(Turkey) Fenerbahce Istanbul

(25–15, 25–23, 25–22)

December 18, 2007

Winiary Kalisz (Poland)
3 – 1
(Azerbaijan) Azerrail Baku
(25–19, 25–27, 25–14, 25–15)
December 19, 2007

Fenerbahce Istanbul (Turkey)
2 – 3
(Russia) Zarechie Odintsovo
(15–25, 27–25, 19–25, 26–24, 6–15)
January 23, 2008

Fenerbahce Istanbul (Turkey)
3 – 0
(Azerbaijan) Azerrail Baku
(25–19, 25–10, 25–19)
January 24, 2008

Zarechie Odintsovo (Russia)
3 – 0
(Poland) Winiary Kalisz
(25–20, 25–21, 25–23)
January 29, 2008

Winiary Kalisz (Poland)
3 – 2
(Turkey) Fenerbahce Istanbul
(26–24, 21–25, 15–25, 25–22, 16–14)

Azerrail Baku (Azerbaijan)
1 – 3
(Russia) Zarechie Odintsovo
(25–22, 22–25, 15–25, 23–25)

=== Pool C ===
Ranking			Matches		Sets			Set points		
#	Team	Pts	Won	Lost	Won	Lost	Ratio	Won	Lost	Ratio
1	(Italy) Asystel Novara	11	5	1	16	4	4.000	498	425	1.172
2	(Switzerland) Voléro Zürich	11	5	1	16	5	3.200	511	460	1.111
3	(Turkey) Türk Telekom Ankara	8	2	4	6	13	0.462	420	429	0.979
4	(France) ASPTT Mulhouse	6	0	6	2	18	0.111	379	494	0.767

November 28, 2007
Voléro Zürich (Switzerland)	3 – 1	(France) ASPTT Mulhouse	(25–18, 25–23, 22–25, 25–17)
Türk Telekom Ankara (Turkey)	0 – 3	(Italy) Asystel Novara	(23–25, 15–25, 17–25)
December 5, 2007
Asystel Novara (Italy)	3 – 1	(Switzerland) Voléro Zürich	(27–25, 25–20, 27–29, 25–18)
ASPTT Mulhouse (France)	1 – 3	(Turkey) Türk Telekom Ankara	(15–25, 14–25, 25–17, 20–25)
December 12, 2007
Voléro Zürich (Switzerland)	3 – 0	(Turkey) Türk Telekom Ankara	(25–18, 25–20, 25–21)
ASPTT Mulhouse (France)	0 – 3	(Italy) Asystel Novara	(24–26, 21–25, 17–25)
December 19, 2007
Asystel Novara (Italy)	3 – 0	(France) ASPTT Mulhouse	(25–15, 25–18, 25–16)
December 20, 2007
Türk Telekom Ankara (Turkey)	0 – 3	(Switzerland) Voléro Zürich	(23–25, 21–25, 21–25)
January 23, 2008
Voléro Zürich (Switzerland)	3 – 1	(Italy) Asystel Novara	(25–20, 25–18, 18–25, 25–23)
January 24, 2008
Türk Telekom Ankara (Turkey)	3 – 0	(France) ASPTT Mulhouse	(25–13, 25–14, 25–21)
January 29, 2008
Asystel Novara (Italy)	3 – 0	(Turkey) Türk Telekom Ankara	(31–29, 26–24, 25–21)
ASPTT Mulhouse (France)	0 – 3	(Switzerland) Voléro Zürich	(27–29, 16–25, 20–25)

=== Pool D ===
			Matches		Sets			Set points		
#	Team	Pts	Won	Lost	Won	Lost	Ratio	Won	Lost	Ratio
1	(Italy) Sirio Perugia	10	4	2	15	7	2.143	516	454	1.137
2	(Spain) Grupo 2002 Murcia	10	4	2	15	8	1.875	522	480	1.088
3	(Turkey) Eczacibasi Istanbul	10	4	2	12	9	1.333	471	418	1.127
4	(Serbia) Postar 064 Beograd	6	0	6	0	18	0.000	293	450	0.651

November 28, 2007
Sirio Perugia (Italy)	3 – 0	(Turkey) Eczacibasi Istanbul	(25–11, 25–21, 27–25)
November 29, 2007
Grupo 2002 Murcia (Spain)	3 – 0	(Serbia) Postar 064 Beograd	(25–21, 25–21, 25–12)
December 5, 2007
Postar 064 Beograd (Serbia)	0 – 3	(Italy) Sirio Perugia	(17–25, 17–25, 20–25)
Eczacibasi Istanbul (Turkey)	3 – 2	(Spain) Grupo 2002 Murcia	(22–25, 25–19, 25–20, 24–26, 15–8)
December 12, 2007
Sirio Perugia (Italy)	2 – 3	(Spain) Grupo 2002 Murcia	(18–25, 20–25, 27–25, 25–20, 16–18)
Eczacibasi Istanbul (Turkey)	3 – 0	(Serbia) Postar 064 Beograd	(25–18, 25–17, 25–9)
December 18, 2007
Postar 064 Beograd (Serbia)	0 – 3	(Turkey) Eczacibasi Istanbul	(19–25, 9–25, 11–25)
December 20, 2007
Grupo 2002 Murcia (Spain)	1 – 3	(Italy) Sirio Perugia	(20–25, 25–23, 22–25, 19–25)
January 23, 2008
Sirio Perugia (Italy)	3 – 0	(Serbia) Postar 064 Beograd	(25–19, 25–19, 25–11)
January 24, 2008
Grupo 2002 Murcia (Spain)	3 – 0	(Turkey) Eczacibasi Istanbul	(25–19, 25–16, 25–23)
January 29, 2008
Postar 064 Beograd (Serbia)	0 – 3	(Spain) Grupo 2002 Murcia	(17–25, 20–25, 16–25)
Eczacibasi Istanbul (Turkey)	3 – 1	(Italy) Sirio Perugia	(20–25, 25–20, 25–20, 25–20)

=== Pool E ===
			Matches		Sets			Set points		
#	Team	Pts	Won	Lost	Won	Lost	Ratio	Won	Lost	Ratio
1	(Netherlands) Dela Martinus Amstelveen	11	5	1	17	5	3.400	510	432	1.181
2	(Russia) Dynamo Moscow	10	4	2	15	9	1.667	537	510	1.053
3	(Spain) Spar Tenerife Marichal	9	3	3	10	10	1.000	448	427	1.049
4	(Austria) Post Schwechat	6	0	6	0	18	0.000	330	456	0.724

November 27, 2007
Dela Martinus Amstelveen (Netherlands)	3 – 2	(Russia) Dynamo Moscow	(25–10, 22–25, 25–18, 26–28, 15–13)
November 28, 2007
Post Schwechat (Austria)	0 – 3	(Spain) Spar Tenerife Marichal	(19–25, 23–25, 23–25)
December 5, 2007
Dynamo Moscow (Russia)	3 – 0	(Austria) Post Schwechat	(30–28, 25–23, 25–15)
Spar Tenerife Marichal (Spain)	0 – 3	(Netherlands) Dela Martinus Amstelveen	(18–25, 21–25, 22–25)
December 12, 2007
Post Schwechat (Austria)	0 – 3	(Netherlands) Dela Martinus Amstelveen	(23–25, 22–25, 14–25)
Spar Tenerife Marichal (Spain)	3 – 1	(Russia) Dynamo Moscow	(19–25, 25–19, 25–23, 25–17)
December 20, 2007
Dynamo Moscow (Russia)	3 – 1	(Spain) Spar Tenerife Marichal	(17–25, 25–20, 25–18, 25–15)
Dela Martinus Amstelveen (Netherlands)	3 – 0	(Austria) Post Schwechat	(25–15, 25–13, 25–14)
January 23, 2008
Post Schwechat (Austria)	0 – 3	(Russia) Dynamo Moscow	(24–26, 19–25, 19–25)
January 24, 2008
Dela Martinus Amstelveen (Netherlands)	3 – 0	(Spain) Spar Tenerife Marichal	(25–23, 25–20, 25–22)
January 29, 2008
Dynamo Moscow (Russia)	3 – 2	(Netherlands) Dela Martinus Amstelveen	(26–24, 22–25, 25–14, 23–25, 15–9)
Spar Tenerife Marichal (Spain)	3 – 0	(Austria) Post Schwechat	(25–8, 25–14, 25–14)

== Play-off 12 ==
- first leg: 12/13/14 February 2008
- second leg: 19/20/21 February 2008

Team #1	Team #2	1st leg	2nd leg
(Italy) Sirio Perugia	(Spain) Spar Tenerife Marichal	3 – 0	3 – 1
(Russia) Dynamo Moscow	(Italy) Vini Monteschiavo Jesi	1 – 3	1 – 3
(Russia) Zarechie Odintsovo	(Poland) Farmutil Pila	3 – 0	3 – 1
(Poland) Winiary Kalisz	(Netherlands) Dela Martinus Amstelveen	3 – 2	0 – 3
(Italy) Asystel Novara	(Turkey) Eczacibasi Istanbul	3 – 0	1 – 3
(France) RC Cannes	(Switzerland) Voléro Zürich	2 – 3	0 – 3

=== First leg ===
February 12, 2008
Dynamo Moscow (Russia)	1 – 3	(Italy) Vini Monteschiavo Jesi	(23–25, 18–25, 25–18, 20–25)
Asystel Novara (Italy)	3 – 0	(Turkey) Eczacibasi Istanbul	(33–31, 25–19, 25–21)
February 13, 2008
Sirio Perugia (Italy)	3 – 0	(Spain) Spar Tenerife Marichal	(25–13, 25–23, 25–19)
February 14, 2008
Zarechie Odintsovo (Russia)	3 – 0	(Poland) Farmutil Pila	(25–16, 25–19, 25–22)
Winiary Kalisz (Poland)	3 – 2	(Netherlands) Dela Martinus Amstelveen	(19–25, 24–26, 25–21, 25–18, 16–14)
RC Cannes (France)	2 – 3	(Switzerland) Voléro Zürich	(25–19, 21–25, 22–25, 25–20, 13–15)

=== Second leg ===
February 20, 2008
Spar Tenerife Marichal (Spain)	1 – 3	(Italy) Sirio Perugia	(26–28, 25–23, 18–25, 22–25)
Vini Monteschiavo Jesi (Italy)	3 – 1	(Russia) Dynamo Moscow	(25–20, 25–18, 22–25, 29–27)
Voléro Zürich (Switzerland)	3 – 0	(France) RC Cannes	(25–21, 25–20, 25–12)
February 21, 2008
Farmutil Pila (Poland)	1 – 3	(Russia) Zarechie Odintsovo	(25–23, 15–25, 17–25, 29–31)
Dela Martinus Amstelveen (Netherlands)	3 – 0	(Poland) Winiary Kalisz	(30–28, 25–18, 25–17)
Eczacibasi Istanbul (Turkey)	3 – 1	(Italy) Asystel Novara	(13–25, 25–17, 25–19, 25–21)

== Play-off 6 ==
- first leg: 4/5/6 March 2008
- second leg: 11/12/13 March 2008

Team #1	Team #2	1st leg	2nd leg
(Italy) Sirio Perugia	(Italy) Vini Monteschiavo Jesi	3 – 0	2 – 3
(Russia) Zarechie Odintsovo	(Netherlands) Dela Martinus Amstelveen	3 – 1	2 – 3
(Italy) Asystel Novara	(Switzerland) Voléro Zürich	3 – 0	2 – 3

=== First leg ===
March 4, 2008

Zarechie Odintsovo (Russia)
3 – 1
(Netherlands) Dela Martinus Amstelveen
(15–25, 25–19, 25–15, 25–15 )
March 5, 2008

Sirio Perugia (Italy)
3 – 0
(Italy) Vini Monteschiavo Jesi
(25–18, 30–28, 34–32 )

Asystel Novara (Italy)
3 – 0
(Switzerland) Voléro Zürich

(25–23, 25–23, 25–21 )

=== Second leg ===
March 12, 2008
Voléro Zürich (Switzerland)	3 – 2	(Italy) Asystel Novara	(23–25, 21–25, 25–20, 25–20, 15- 11 )
Vini Monteschiavo Jesi (Italy)	3 – 2	(Italy) Sirio Perugia	(25–21, 15–25, 25–23, 17–25, 15–6 )
March 13, 2008
Dela Martinus Amstelveen (Netherlands)	3 – 2	(Russia) Zarechie Odintsovo	(25–23, 25–15, 20–25, 22–25, 15–10 )

== Final four ==
Palacio de Deportes de Murcia, Murcia, 5 & 6 April 2008

Semi-finals
5 April
(Spain) Grupo 2002 Murcia	1
(Russia) Zarechie Odintsovo	3
5 April
(Italy) Colussi Perugia	3
(Italy) Asystel Novara	2

Final
6 April
(Russia) Zarechie Odintsovo	1
(Italy) Colussi Perugia	3
3rd place
6 April
(Spain) Grupo 2002 Murcia	2
(Italy) Asystel Novara	3

=== Semi-finals ===
April 5, 2008
Grupo 2002 Murcia (Spain)	1 – 3	(Russia) Zarechie Odintsovo	(15–25, 25–19, 22–25, 23–25)
Colussi Perugia (Italy)	3 – 2	(Italy) Asystel Novara	(25–22, 20–25, 25–17, 23–25, 15–12)

=== Match 3/4 ===
April 6, 2008
Grupo 2002 Murcia (Spain)	2 – 3	(Italy) Asystel Novara	(27–29, 25–22, 27- 25, 25–27, 11–15)

=== Match 1/2 ===
April 6, 2008
Zarechie Odintsovo (Russia)	1 – 3	(Italy) Colussi Perugia	( 15–25, 21–25, 25–18, 14–25)

== Final standing ==
Rank	Team
1st place, gold medalist(s)	(Italy) Colussi Perugia
2nd place, silver medalist(s)	(Russia) Zarechie Odintsovo
3rd place, bronze medalist(s)	(Italy) Asystel Novara
4	(Spain) Grupo 2002 Murcia

2007–08 Women's Club European Champions

Colussi Perugia
2nd title

Roster for Final Four
Hanka Pachale, Ana Grbać, Lucia Crisanti, Neli Marinova, Giulia Decordi, Chiara Arcangeli, Beatrice Sacco, Mirka Francia, Antonella Del Core, Tatiana Artmenko and Simona Gioli
Head coach
Emanuele Sbano

== Individual awards Final Four ==
Winners:

- MVP: (Italy) Simona Gioli, Colussi Perugia
- Best Scorer: (Poland) Katarzyna Skowrońska, Asystel Novara
- Best Spiker: (Cuba) Mirka Francia, Colussi Perugia
- Best Receiver: (Croatia) Nataša Osmokrović, Asystel Novara
- Best Server: (Russia) Zhanna Pronicheva, Zarechie Odintsovo
- Best Blocker: (Spain) Marisa Fernandez, Grupo 2002 Murcia
- Best Setter: (Brazil) Hélia Souza, Grupo 2002 Murcia
- Best Libero: (Italy) Paola Cardullo, Asystel Novara
