= Franconia (disambiguation) =

Franconia is a historical region of southern Germany.

Franconia may also refer to:

== Locations ==
=== Germany ===
- Duchy of Franconia, one of the stem duchies of the Kingdom of Germany
- Franconia (wine region), one of the 13 wine regions of Germany
- Gau Franconia, an administrative division of Nazi Germany

=== United States ===
Listed alphabetically by state

- Franconia, Arizona, a former railroad siding in Mohave County
- Franconia, Minnesota, an unincorporated community in Chisago County
  - Franconia Township, Minnesota
- Franconia, New Hampshire, a town in Grafton County
  - Franconia College, located here
  - Franconia Notch, a mountain pass
  - Franconia Range, a mountain range adjacent to the notch
- Franconia, Ohio, a ghost town in Putnam County
- Franconia, Pennsylvania, an unincorporated community in Montgomery County
  - Franconia Township, Pennsylvania
- Franconia, Virginia, a census-designated place in Fairfax County

== People ==
- Conrad II of Franconia (c. 989/990–1039), Emperor of the Holy Roman Empire
- Eberhard of Franconia (c. 885–939), Duke of Franconia
- Hedwiga of Franconia (c. 850/55–903), Duchess of Saxony
- Henry of Franconia (died 886), military commander of the Carolingian Empire
- Matilda of Franconia (c. 1027–1034), daughter of Emperor Conrad II and Gisela of Swabia

== Transportation ==
=== Ships ===
- SS Franconia (1903), a cargo ship, renamed Malakoff in 1927
- RMS Franconia (1910), a Cunard liner and troopship, sunk in 1915 in World War I
- RMS Franconia (1922), a Cunard liner and troopship, scrapped in 1956
- RMS Ivernia (1954), a Cunard liner and cruise ship, renamed Franconia in 1963

=== Locomotives ===
- British Rail Class 40, a diesel locomotive D220 built by English Electric

=== Other ===
- Franconia–Springfield station, a metro rail, commuter rail, and bus station in Springfield, Virginia, United States
- Virginia State Route 644 (Fairfax County), a secondary state highway in Virginia, United States; named Franconia Road for part of the route

== Other ==
- Franconia (hymn tune), a hymn tune by Johann Balthasar König
- Franconia (grape), an alternative name for the wine grape Blaufränkisch
- Franconia Brewing Company, a microbrewery in McKinney, Texas, U.S.
- Franconia Mennonite Conference, a regional conference of the Mennonite Church USA

== See also ==
- Francia (disambiguation)
- Francona (disambiguation)
- Franconian (disambiguation)
