= Fabiana Alvim =

Brazilian volleyball player

Fabi Alvim
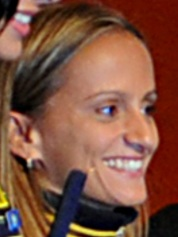

Personal information
- Full name: Fabiana Alvim de Oliveira
- Nickname: Fabi, Fabizinha
- Born: 7 March 1980 (age 46); Rio de Janeiro, Brazil
- Height: 1.66 m (5 ft 5 in)
- Weight: 56 kg (123 lb)

Volleyball information
- Position: Libero
- Current club: Retired

Career
Years	Teams
1998–99	Macaé
1999–2000	Flamengo
2000–01	Vasco da Gama
2001–05	ACF Campos
2005–18	Rio de Janeiro

National team
2002–13	Brazil
Honours
Women's volleyball
Representing Brazil
Olympic Games
Gold medal – first place	2008 Beijing	Team
Gold medal – first place	2012 London	Team
World Championship
Silver medal – second place	2006 Japan	Team
Silver medal – second place	2010 Japan	Team
World Cup
Silver medal – second place	2007 Japan	Team
World Grand Champions Cup
Gold medal – first place	2013 Tokyo/Nagoya	Team
Silver medal – second place	2009 Tokyo/Fukuoka	Team
Pan American Games
Gold medal – first place	2011 Guadalajara	Team
Silver medal – second place	2007 Rio de Janeiro	Team
Pan-American Cup
Gold medal – first place	2009 Miami
Gold medal – first place	2011 Ciudad Juárez
South American Championship
Gold medal – first place	2005 La Paz
Gold medal – first place	2007 Santiago
Gold medal – first place	2009 Porto Alegre
Gold medal – first place	2011 Callao
Gold medal – first place	2013 Ica
Final Four Cup
Gold medal – first place	2008 Fortaleza
- Last updated: March 2026

Fabiana "Fabi" Alvim de Oliveira (born 7 March 1980) is a former Brazilian volleyball player who specialized as a libero. Representing Brazil's national team, she has won the gold medal at the 2008 and 2012 Summer Olympics.

Alvim is widely acclaimed as one of the greatest liberos on volleyball history.

== Career ==
Fabiana started playing volleyball at the age of 13, specializing in defense - and later the libero position - due to her short height. De Oliveira was first called up to the Brazil women's national volleyball team in 2002, under coach Marco Aurélio Motta. She lost her place under his replacement, José Roberto Guimarães, and only returned to being a mainstay of the team in 2005. At the 2007 Pan American Games, held in Rio de Janeiro, de Oliveira and the Brazilian team won the silver medal.

One year later, de Oliveira won the gold medal at the 2008 Summer Olympics, and was chosen as the best libero of the tournament.

At the 2011 Pan-American Cup, de Oliveira was given the "Best Receiver" award, also winning the gold medal with her national team.

Oliveira was part of the national team who won the gold medal at the 2011 Pan American Games held in Guadalajara, Mexico. She was also part of the Brazilian team that won the gold medal at the 2012 Summer Olympics. She also took the 2013 South American Championship with her national team, winning the Best Libero award.

Oliveira won the silver medal at the 2013 Club World Championship, playing with Unilever Vôlei.

During the 2015 FIVB Club World Championship, Oliveira played with the Brazilian club Rexona Ades Rio and her team lost the bronze medal match to the Swiss Voléro Zürich.

Oliveira decided to retire from volleyball after the 2017/2018 season of the Brazilian Superliga, when her team Sesc Rio won the silver medal. Currently Oliveira is working as a volleyball commentator.

== Awards ==
=== Individuals ===
- 2002 FIVB World Grand Prix – "Best Libero"
- 2008 Final Four Cup – "Best Libero"
- 2008 Final Four Cup – "Best Receiver"
- 2008 Summer Olympics – "Best Libero"
- 2009 South American Club Championship – "Best Libero"
- 2009 Montreux Volley Masters – "Best Libero"
- 2009 South American Championship – "Most Valuable Player"
- 2009 South American Championship – "Best Receiver"
- 2011 Pan-American Cup – "Best Receiver"
- 2011 FIVB World Grand Prix – "Best Digger"
- 2011 South American Championship – "Best Libero"
- 2011 FIVB World Cup – "Best Receiver"
- 2013 South American Club Championship – "Best Libero"
- 2013 South American Championship – "Best Libero"
- 2013 FIVB World Grand Prix – "Best Libero"
- 2015 South American Club Championship – "Best Libero"
- 2016 South American Club Championship – "Best Libero"
- 2016 FIVB Club World Championship – "Best Libero"
- 2017 South American Club Championship – "Best Libero"

=== Clubs ===
- 2013 FIVB Club World Championship – Runner-up, with Unilever Vôlei
- 2017 FIVB Club World Championship – Runner-up, with Rexona/SESC
- 2013 Club South American Championship – Champion, with Unilever Vôlei
- 2015 Club South American Championship – Champion, with Rexona/Ades
- 2016 Club South American Championship – Champion, with Rexona/Ades
- 2017 South American Club Championship – Champion, with Rexona/SESC
- 2018 South American Club Championship – Runner-up, with SESC Rio

Awards
Preceded by (Italy) Paola Cardullo	Best Libero of Olympic Games; 2008	Succeeded by (Dominican Republic) Brenda Castillo
Preceded by Unknown	Best Libero of South American Championship; 2005; 2007; 2011; 2013	Succeeded by (Argentina) Marianela Robinet (Colombia) Camila Gómez
Preceded by (Brazil) Paula Pequeno	Most Valuable Player of South American Championship; 2009	Succeeded by (Brazil) Sheilla Castro
Preceded by -	Best Libero of FIVB World Grand Champions Cup; 2009	Succeeded by (Japan) Arisa Satō
Preceded by (China) Zhang Xian	Best Libero of FIVB World Grand Prix; 2013	Succeeded by (Japan) Yūko Sano
Preceded by (Serbia) Silvija Popović	Best Libero of FIVB Club World Championship; 2016	Succeeded by (Serbia) Silvija Popović
