= Asystel Novara =

Asystel Novara was a name used by two different women volleyball clubs based in Novara, Italy. It may refer to:

- AGIL Volley, played as Asystel Novara from 2001 until 2003
- Asystel Volley, played as Asystel Novara from 2003 until 2012
