= 2008–09 CEV Women's Champions League =

- League: CEV Women's Champions League
- Sport: Volleyball
- Finals champions: (Italy) Volley Bergamo
- Runners-up: (Russia) Dynamo Moscow
- Finals MVP: (Italy) Serena Ortolani (Volley Bergamo)

CEV Women's Champions League seasons
- ← 2007–08 2009–10 →

The 2008–2009 Women's CEV Champions League was an international volleyball club competition for elite clubs throughout Europe.

== Teams of the 2008–2009 ==
Participants:

Rank	Country	The number of teams	Teams
1	Italy	3	Scavolini Pesaro; Colussi Sirio Perugia; Volley Bergamo
2	Turkey	3	Eczacıbaşı Zentiva; VakıfBank Güneş Sigorta Istanbul (w/c); Türk Telekom Ankara (w/c)
3	Russia	2	Zarechie Odintsovo; Dynamo Moscow
4	Spain	2	CAV Murcia 2005; Tubillete.Com Tenerife (w/c)
5	France	2	RC Cannes; ASPTT Mulhouse
6	Poland	2	Fakro Muszynianka Muszyna; Farmutil Piła
7	Netherlands	1	Dela Martinus Amstelveen
8	Croatia	1	Rijeka Kvig
9	Romania	1	Metal Galaţi
15	Serbia	1	Postar 064 Beograd (w/c)
18	Austria	1	SVS Post Schwechat (w/c)
27	Czech Republic	1	VK Prostějov (w/c)

== Main phase ==
=== Pool A ===
Pos	Team	Pld	W	L	Pts	SW	SL	SR	SPW	SPL	SPR
1	(Russia) Dynamo Moscow	6	6	0	12	18	1	18.000	473	336	1.408
2	(Croatia) Rijeka Kvig	6	3	3	9	11	10	1.100	440	470	0.936
3	(Czech Republic) VK Prostějov	6	3	3	9	11	13	0.846	510	517	0.986
4	(Spain) CAV Murcia 2005	6	0	6	6	2	18	0.111	375	475	0.789

November 6, 2008

	Score		Set 1	Set 2	Set 3	Set 4	Set 5
CAV Murcia 2005 (Spain)	2–3	(Czech Republic) VK Prostějov	25:21	21:25	25:14	22:25	13:15
Rijeka Kvig (Croatia)	0–3	(Russia) Dynamo Moscow	20:25	17:25	19:25		

November 12–13, 2008

	Score		Set 1	Set 2	Set 3	Set 4	Set 5
VK Prostějov (Czech Republic)	3–2	(Croatia) Rijeka Kvig	25:14	24:26	23:25	25:20	15:11
Dynamo Moscow (Russia)	3–0	(Spain) CAV Murcia 2005	25:7	25:20	25:12		

December 9–11, 2008

	Score		Set 1	Set 2	Set 3	Set 4	Set 5
VK Prostějov (Czech Republic)	1–3	(Russia) Dynamo Moscow	19:25	25:23	19:25	17:25	
CAV Murcia 2005 (Spain)	0–3	(Croatia) Rijeka Kvig	22:25	22:25	16:25		

December 17–18, 2008

	Score		Set 1	Set 2	Set 3	Set 4	Set 5
Rijeka Kvig (Croatia)	3–0	(Spain) CAV Murcia 2005	25:19	25:21	25:21		
Dynamo Moscow (Russia)	3–0	(Czech Republic) VK Prostějov	25:18	25:17	25:21		

January 14–15, 2009

	Score		Set 1	Set 2	Set 3	Set 4	Set 5
Rijeka Kvig (Croatia)	3–1	(Czech Republic) VK Prostějov	14:25	25:18	27:25	25:19	
CAV Murcia 2005 (Spain)	0–3	(Russia) Dynamo Moscow	21:25	20:25	17:25		

January 20, 2009

	Score		Set 1	Set 2	Set 3	Set 4	Set 5
Dynamo Moscow (Russia)	3–0	(Croatia) Rijeka Kvig	25:21	25:11	25:15		
VK Prostějov (Czech Republic)	3–0	(Spain) CAV Murcia 2005	25:23	25:12	25:16		

=== Pool B ===
Pos	Team	Pld	W	L	Pts	SW	SL	SR	SPW	SPL	SPR
1	(France) RC Cannes	6	5	1	11	16	8	2.000	562	526	1.068
2	(Turkey) Türk Telekom Ankara	6	4	2	10	13	8	1.625	502	442	1.136
3	(Serbia) Postar 064 Beograd	6	3	3	9	12	11	1.091	501	500	1.002
4	(Spain) Tubillete.Com Tenerife	6	0	6	6	4	18	0.222	437	534	0.818

November 4–6, 2008

	Score		Set 1	Set 2	Set 3	Set 4	Set 5
RC Cannes (France)	3–2	(Serbia) Postar 064 Beograd	21:25	25:22	23:25	25:23	15:6
Türk Telekom Ankara (Turkey)	3–1	(Spain) Tubillete.Com Tenerife	25:12	22:25	25:21	25:23	

November 12, 2008

	Score		Set 1	Set 2	Set 3	Set 4	Set 5
Tubillete.Com Tenerife (Spain)	1–3	(France) RC Cannes	13:25	22:25	29:27	22:25	
Postar 064 Beograd (Serbia)	3–0	(Turkey) Türk Telekom Ankara	25:18	25:21	25:22		

December 9, 2008

	Score		Set 1	Set 2	Set 3	Set 4	Set 5
RC Cannes (France)	3–1	(Turkey) Türk Telekom Ankara	25:21	28:26	17:25	25:21	
Postar 064 Beograd (Serbia)	3–0	(Spain) Tubillete.Com Tenerife	25:16	25:20	25:19		

December 17–18, 2008

	Score		Set 1	Set 2	Set 3	Set 4	Set 5
Tubillete.Com Tenerife (Spain)	2–3	(Serbia) Postar 064 Beograd	25:23	19:25	23:25	25:21	14:16
Türk Telekom Ankara (Turkey)	3–1	(France) RC Cannes	25:20	26:28	25:21	25:18	

January 13–14, 2009

	Score		Set 1	Set 2	Set 3	Set 4	Set 5
RC Cannes (France)	3–0	(Spain) Tubillete.Com Tenerife	25:23	25:16	25:20		
Türk Telekom Ankara (Turkey)	3–0	(Serbia) Postar 064 Beograd	25:16	25:22	25:16		

January 20, 2009

	Score		Set 1	Set 2	Set 3	Set 4	Set 5
Tubillete.Com Tenerife (Spain)	0–3	(Turkey) Türk Telekom Ankara	14:25	20:25	16:25		
Postar 064 Beograd (Serbia)	1–3	(France) RC Cannes	16:25	25:19	23:25	22:25	

=== Pool C ===
Pos	Team	Pld	W	L	Pts	SW	SL	SR	SPW	SPL	SPR
1	(Italy) Volley Bergamo	6	5	1	11	16	9	1.778	546	528	1.034
2	(Turkey) Vakıfbank Güneş Sigorta	6	3	3	9	13	13	1.000	581	568	1.023
3	(Poland) Fakro Muszynianka Muszyna	6	3	3	9	11	11	1.000	468	493	0.949
4	(Romania) Metal Galaţi	6	1	5	7	8	15	0.533	497	503	0.988

November 5–6, 2008

	Score		Set 1	Set 2	Set 3	Set 4	Set 5
Vakıfbank Güneş Sigorta (Turkey)	2–3	(Italy) Volley Bergamo	18:25	25:21	23:25	25:18	12:15
Fakro Muszynianka Muszyna (Poland)	0–3	(Romania) Metal Galaţi	10:25	18:25	14:25		

November 11–12, 2008

	Score		Set 1	Set 2	Set 3	Set 4	Set 5
Volley Bergamo (Italy)	1–3	(Poland) Fakro Muszynianka Muszyna	27:25	20:25	15:25	22:25	
Metal Galaţi (Romania)	1–3	(Turkey) Vakıfbank Güneş Sigorta	16:25	25:21	24:26	23:25	

December 10–11, 2008

	Score		Set 1	Set 2	Set 3	Set 4	Set 5
Metal Galaţi (Romania)	2–3	(Italy) Volley Bergamo	22:25	25:14	25:15	18:25	11:15
Fakro Muszynianka Muszyna (Poland)	3–0	(Turkey) Vakıfbank Güneş Sigorta	26:24	27:25	25:20		

December 16–17, 2008

	Score		Set 1	Set 2	Set 3	Set 4	Set 5
Volley Bergamo (Italy)	3–0	(Romania) Metal Galaţi	25:21	25:18	25:23		
Vakıfbank Güneş Sigorta (Turkey)	3–0	(Poland) Fakro Muszynianka Muszyna	20:25	25:14	21:25	25:22	15:11

January 14–15, 2009

	Score		Set 1	Set 2	Set 3	Set 4	Set 5
Vakıfbank Güneş Sigorta (Turkey)	3–1	(Romania) Metal Galaţi	22:25	27:25	25:14	26:24	
Fakro Muszynianka Muszyna (Poland)	0–3	(Poland) Volley Bergamo	14:25	24:26	18:25		

January 20, 2009

	Score		Set 1	Set 2	Set 3	Set 4	Set 5
Volley Bergamo (Italy)	3–2	(Turkey) Vakıfbank Güneş Sigorta	26:24	21:25	25:19	26:28	15:10
Metal Galaţi (Romania)	1–3	(Poland) Fakro Muszynianka Muszyna	25:20	20:25	17:25	21:25	

=== Pool D ===
Pos	Team	Pld	W	L	Pts	SW	SL	SR	SPW	SPL	SPR
1	(Italy) Colussi Sirio Perugia	6	4	2	10	16	10	1.600	576	508	1.134
2	(Poland) Farmutil Piła	6	3	3	9	13	12	1.083	567	548	1.035
3	(Russia) Zarechie Odintsovo	6	3	3	9	11	12	0.917	507	518	0.979
4	(Netherlands) Dela Martinus Amstelveen	6	2	4	8	9	15	0.600	481	557	0.864

November 5, 2008

	Score		Set 1	Set 2	Set 3	Set 4	Set 5
Zarechie Odintsovo (Russia)	3–0	(Netherlands) Dela Martinus Amstelveen	25:19	25:23	25:22		
Colussi Sirio Perugia (Italy)	3–2	(Poland) Farmutil Piła	23:25	21:25	25:22	25:10	17:15

November 11–12, 2008

	Score		Set 1	Set 2	Set 3	Set 4	Set 5
Farmutil Piła (Poland)	1–3	(Russia) Zarechie Odintsovo	25:22	24:26	20:25	26:28	
Dela Martinus Amstelveen (Netherlands)	3–2	(Italy) Colussi Sirio Perugia	11:25	25:23	25:23	14:25	15:11

December 10–11, 2008

	Score		Set 1	Set 2	Set 3	Set 4	Set 5
Zarechie Odintsovo (Russia)	2–3	(Italy) Colussi Sirio Perugia	25:15	20:25	17:25	28:26	13:15
Dela Martinus Amstelveen (Netherlands)	3–1	(Poland) Farmutil Piła	25:23	17:25	28:26	25:20	

December 16–17, 2008

	Score		Set 1	Set 2	Set 3	Set 4	Set 5
Farmutil Piła (Poland)	3–1	(Netherlands) Dela Martinus Amstelveen	25:12	25:18	25:27	25:17	
Colussi Sirio Perugia (Italy)	3–0	(Russia) Zarechie Odintsovo	25:18	25:22	25:17		

January 14, 2009

	Score		Set 1	Set 2	Set 3	Set 4	Set 5
Colussi Sirio Perugia (Italy)	3–0	(Netherlands) Dela Martinus Amstelveen	25:17	25:17	25:21		
Zarechie Odintsovo (Russia)	0–3	(Poland) Farmutil Piła	22:25	23:25	20:25		

January 20, 2009

	Score		Set 1	Set 2	Set 3	Set 4	Set 5
Farmutil Piła (Poland)	3–2	(Italy) Colussi Sirio Perugia	25:19	21:25	25:22	15:21	
Dela Martinus Amstelveen (Netherlands)	2–3	(Russia) Zarechie Odintsovo	24:26	25:23	21:25	25:17	8:15

=== Pool E ===
Pos	Team	Pld	W	L	Pts	SW	SL	SR	SPW	SPL	SPR
1	(Italy) Scavolini Pesaro	6	6	0	12	18	2	9.000	498	356	1.399
2	(Turkey) Eczacıbaşı Zentiva	6	4	2	10	13	11	1.182	533	482	1.106
3	(France) ASPTT Mulhouse	6	2	4	8	10	12	0.833	430	486	0.885
4	(Austria) SVS Post Schwechat	6	0	6	6	2	18	0.111	344	481	0.715

November 4–5, 2008

	Score		Set 1	Set 2	Set 3	Set 4	Set 5
SVS Post Schwechat (Austria)	0–3	(France) ASPTT Mulhouse	10:25	20:25	20:25		
Scavolini Pesaro (Italy)	3–0	(Turkey) Eczacıbaşı Zentiva	25:20	25:16	28:26		

November 11–12, 2008

	Score		Set 1	Set 2	Set 3	Set 4	Set 5
ASPTT Mulhouse (France)	1–3	(Italy) Scavolini Pesaro	13:25	25:23	8:25	21:25	
Eczacıbaşı Zentiva (Turkey)	3–2	(Austria) SVS Post Schwechat	25:10	25:23	25:27	16:25	15:11

December 10, 2008

	Score		Set 1	Set 2	Set 3	Set 4	Set 5
Scavolini Pesaro (Italy)	3–0	(Austria) SVS Post Schwechat	25:11	25:13	25:17		
Eczacıbaşı Zentiva (Turkey)	3–1	(France) ASPTT Mulhouse	25:14	25:23	17:25	25:12	

December 17, 2008

	Score		Set 1	Set 2	Set 3	Set 4	Set 5
ASPTT Mulhouse (France)	2–3	(Turkey) Eczacıbaşı Zentiva	4:25	25:21	19:25	31:29	11:15
SVS Post Schwechat (Austria)	0–3	(Italy) Scavolini Pesaro	17:25	16:25	21:25		

January 13–14, 2009

	Score		Set 1	Set 2	Set 3	Set 4	Set 5
Scavolini Pesaro (Italy)	3–0	(France) ASPTT Mulhouse	25:13	25:17	25:19		
SVS Post Schwechat (Austria)	0–3	(Turkey) Eczacıbaşı Zentiva	14:25	18:25	15:25		

January 20, 2009

	Score		Set 1	Set 2	Set 3	Set 4	Set 5
ASPTT Mulhouse (France)	3–0	(Austria) SVS Post Schwechat	25:19	25:21	25:16		
Eczacıbaşı Zentiva (Turkey)	1–3	(Italy) Scavolini Pesaro	20:25	25:22	17:25	21:25	

== Play-offs ==
=== Playoffs 12 ===
Team 1	Agg.	Team 2	1st leg	2nd leg
Scavolini Pesaro (Italy)	6 – 2	(Russia) Zarechie Odintsovo	3 – 2	3 – 0
Farmutil Piła (Poland)	0 – 6	(Italy) Volley Bergamo	0 – 3	0 – 3
Türk Telekom Ankara (Turkey)	6 – 0	(Croatia) Rijeka Kvig	3 – 0	3 – 0
Postar 064 Beograd (Serbia)	1 – 6	(Russia) Dynamo Moscow	1 – 3	0 – 3
RC Cannes (France)	2 – 6	(Poland) Fakro Muszynianka Muszyna	1 – 3	1 – 3
Vakıfbank Güneş Sigorta (Turkey)	3 – 6	(Turkey) Eczacıbaşı Zentiva	1 – 3	2 – 3

==== First leg ====
February 11–12, 2009

	Score		Set 1	Set 2	Set 3	Set 4	Set 5
Scavolini Pesaro (Italy)	3 – 2	(Russia) Zarechie Odintsovo	24:26	25:19	14:25	26:24	15:4
Farmutil Piła (Poland)	0 – 3	(Italy) Volley Bergamo	23:25	17:25	23:25		
Türk Telekom Ankara (Turkey)	3 – 0	(Croatia) Rijeka Kvig	25:15	25:19	25:21		
Postar 064 Beograd (Serbia)	1 – 3	(Russia) Dynamo Moscow	25:22	22:25	17:25	20:25	
RC Cannes (France)	1 – 3	(Poland) Fakro Muszynianka Muszyna	23:25	25:15	22:25	15:25	
Vakıfbank Güneş Sigorta (Turkey)	1 – 3	(Turkey) Eczacıbaşı Zentiva	21:25	16:25	25:17	16:25	

==== Second leg ====
February 18–19, 2009

	Score		Set 1	Set 2	Set 3	Set 4	Set 5
Zarechie Odintsovo (Russia)	0 – 3	(Italy) Scavolini Pesaro	21:25	15:25	19:25		
Volley Bergamo (Italy)	3 – 0	(Poland) Farmutil Piła	25:13	25:23	25:23		
Rijeka Kvig (Croatia)	0 – 3	(Turkey) Türk Telekom Ankara	17:25	19:25	13:25		
Dynamo Moscow (Russia)	3 – 0	(Serbia) Postar 064 Beograd	25:20	25:22	25:22		
Fakro Muszynianka Muszyna (Poland)	3 – 1	(France) RC Cannes	25:23	25:22	25:27	25:18	
Eczacıbaşı Zentiva (Turkey)	3 – 2	(Turkey) Vakıfbank Güneş Sigorta	24:26	25:14	27:25	23:25	15:13

=== Playoffs 6 ===
Team 1	Agg.	Team 2	1st leg	2nd leg
Scavolini Pesaro (Italy)	4 – 4	(Italy) Volley Bergamo	1 – 3	3 – 1
Türk Telekom Ankara (Turkey)	2 – 6	(Russia) Dynamo Moscow	2 – 3	0 – 3
Fakro Muszynianka Muszyna (Poland)	1 – 6	(Turkey) Eczacıbaşı Zentiva	1 – 3	0 – 3

==== First leg ====
March 4–5, 2009

	Score		Set 1	Set 2	Set 3	Set 4	Set 5
Scavolini Pesaro (Italy)	1 – 3	(Italy) Volley Bergamo	23:25	25:21	22:25	23:25	
Türk Telekom Ankara (Turkey)	2 – 3	(Russia) Dynamo Moscow	25:20	18:25	25:23	23:25	13:15
Fakro Muszynianka Muszyna (Poland)	1 – 3	(Turkey) Eczacıbaşı Zentiva	23:25	26:24	26:28	20:25	

==== Second leg ====
March 11–12, 2009

	Score		Set 1	Set 2	Set 3	Set 4	Set 5
Volley Bergamo (Italy)	1 – 3	(Italy) Scavolini Pesaro	19:25	13:25	25:23	16:25	
Dynamo Moscow (Russia)	3 – 0	(Turkey) Türk Telekom Ankara	25:14	25:18	25:21		
Eczacıbaşı Zentiva (Turkey)	3 – 0	(Poland) Fakro Muszynianka Muszyna	25:17	25:16	25:22		

== Final four ==
Perugia, Italy, 28 & 29 March 2009

Semi-finals
28 March
(Russia) Dynamo Moscow	3
(Turkey) Eczacıbaşı Zentiva	0
28 March
(Italy) Colussi Sirio Perugia	1
(Italy) Volley Bergamo	3

Final
29 March
(Russia) Dynamo Moscow	2
(Italy) Volley Bergamo	3
3rd place
29 March
(Turkey) Eczacıbaşı Zentiva	1
(Italy) Colussi Sirio Perugia	3

=== Semi-finals ===
March 28, 2009

	Score		Set 1	Set 2	Set 3	Set 4	Set 5
Dynamo Moscow (Russia)	3 – 0	(Turkey) Eczacıbaşı Zentiva	25:16	25:16	25:23		
Colussi Sirio Perugia (Italy)	1 – 3	(Italy) Volley Bergamo	15:25	25:23	17:25	24:26	

=== 3rd Place ===
March 29, 2009

	Score		Set 1	Set 2	Set 3	Set 4	Set 5
Eczacıbaşı Zentiva (Turkey)	1 – 3	(Italy) Colussi Sirio Perugia	22:25	25:18	28:30	22:25	14:25

=== Final ===
March 29, 2009

	Score		Set 1	Set 2	Set 3	Set 4	Set 5
Dynamo Moscow (Russia)	2 – 3	(Italy) Volley Bergamo	21:25	25:22	25:14	24:26	10:15

== Final standing ==
Rank	Team
1st place, gold medalist(s)	(Italy) Volley Bergamo
2nd place, silver medalist(s)	(Russia) Dynamo Moscow
3rd place, bronze medalist(s)	(Italy) Colussi Sirio Perugia
4	(Turkey) Eczacıbaşı Zentiva

2008–09 Women's Club European Champions

Volley Bergamo
6th title

Roster for Final Four
Serena Ortolani, Enrica Merlo, Katarzyna Gujska, Erika Araki, Alessandra Camarda, Jenny Barazza, Indre Sorokaite, Lucia Bacchi, Francesca Piccinini, Valentina Arrighetti, Eleonora Lo Bianco and Antonella Del Core
Head coach
Lorenzo Micelli

== Awards ==
Winners:

- MVP: (Italy) Serena Ortolani (Volley Bergamo)
- Best scorer: (Russia) Ekaterina Gamova (Dynamo Moscow)
- Best spiker: (Italy) Simona Gioli (Dynamo Moscow)
- Best server: (Italy) Lucia Crisanti (Colussi Sirio Perugia)
- Best blocker: (Ukraine) Yevgeniya Dushkyevich (Colussi Sirio Perugia)
- Best receiver: (United States) Kim Willoughby (Colussi Sirio Perugia)
- Best setter: (Croatia) Irina Kirillova (Dynamo Moscow)
- Best libero: (Italy) Enrica Merlo (Volley Bergamo)
