= Francia (disambiguation) =

Francia was the Kingdom of the Franks.

Francia may also refer to:

- Latin name for France (used, for example, in Hungarian, Italian, Spanish, Galician, etc.)
- Francia (river), a river in Castile and León, Spain
- Francia (film), a 2009 Argentina film
- La Francia, coal mine in Colombia owned by the Goldman Sachs Group
- Francia (Mexico City Metrobús), a BRT station in Mexico City
- Francia metro station, in Valparaíso, Chile
- Francia, a ship that was wrecked off the coast of Madagascar in 2021

== People ==
- Francesco Francia (1447–1517), Italian artist from Bologna
- José Gaspar Rodríguez de Francia (1766–1840), Paraguayan dictator
- Juan Pablo Francia (born 1984), Argentinian footballer
- Mirka Francia (born 1975), Cuban-Italian volleyball player
- Paolo Francia (1901–????), Italian biathlete
- Peter de Francia (1921–2012), Italian-British artist
- Peter L. Francia (born 1974), American political scientist
- Francia Jackson (born 1975), Dominican Republic volleyball player
- Francia Raisa (born 1988), American actress
