= Jenny Barazza =

Italian volleyball player (born 1984)

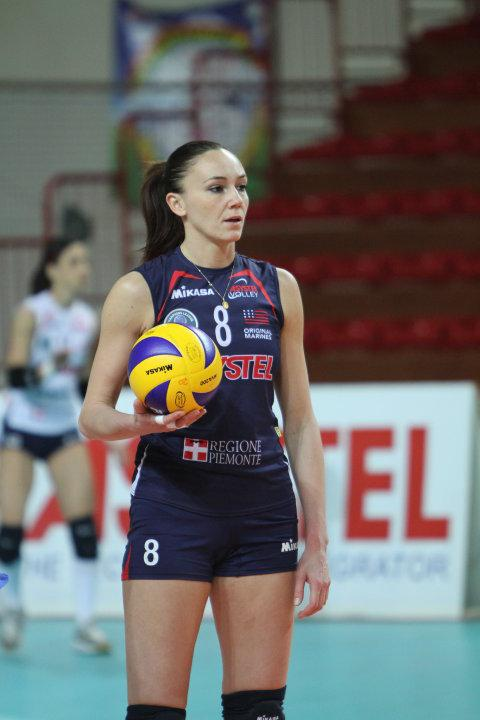

Personal information
- Born: July 24, 1981 (age 45); Codogné, Veneto, Italy
Medal record
Women's volleyball
Representing Italy
World Grand Champions Cup
Gold medal – first place	2009 Tokyo/Fukuoka	Team
FIVB World Cup
Gold medal – first place	2007 Japan	Team
FIVB World Grand Prix
Silver medal – second place	2004 Reggio Calabria	Team
Bronze medal – third place	2007 Ningbo	Team
European Championship
Gold medal – first place	2007 Belgium/Luxembourg	Team
Gold medal – first place	2009 Poland	Team
Mediterranean Games
Gold medal – first place	2009 Pescara	Team

Jenny Barazza (born July 24, 1981) is an Italian volleyball player. She was born in Codogné, Veneto.

She began to play in her native town. She scored her first success with Foppapedretti Bergamo, where she was a two time national champion (2004 and 2006), a European champion (2005), won a CEV Cup (2004), and one National Cup (2006).

She earned more than 130 caps for the Italian national team, with whom she won the 2007 European Volleyball Championship, and where she also was named Best Blocker of the tournament.

Barazza competed at the 2004, 2008, and 2012 Summer Olympics.

She currently plays for Imoco Volley Conegliano.

== Career ==
Club		Years
Volley Codogné	(Italy)	1996–1997
Co.Mont. Granzotto San Donà	(Italy)	1997–1998
Club Italia	(Italy)	1998–1999
Brums Busto Arsizio	(Italy)	1999–2000
Romanelli Firenze	(Italy)	2000–2002
Mujeres Albacete	(Spain)	2002–2003
Foppapedretti Bergamo	(Italy)	2003–2009
Asystel Novara	(Italy)	2009–2010
stop for maternity	(Italy)	2010–2011
Universal Volley Modena	(Italy)	2011–2013
Imoco Volley Conegliano	(Italy)	2013–2017
Golem Olbia	(Italy)	2017-present

== Sporting achievements ==
=== Club ===
- Italian Championship: 3

2003/04, 2005/06, 2015/16

- Coppa Italia: 3

2005/06, 2007/08, 2016/17

- Supercoppa Italia: 2

2004, 2016

- Champions League: 3

2004/05, 2006/07, 2008/09

- CEV Challenge Cup

2003/04

== Individual awards ==
- 2007 European Championship "Best Blocker"
