= Oh Hyun-mi =

South Korean volleyball player (born 1986)

Oh Hyun-Mi

Personal information
- Nationality: South Korean
- Born: 15 March 1986 (age 40)
- Height: 175 cm (69 in)
- Weight: 62 kg (137 lb)
- Spike: 270 cm (106 in)
- Block: 265 cm (104 in)

Volleyball information
- Number: 6 (national team)

Career
Years	Teams
2009	GS Caltex

National team
2009	South Korea

Oh Hyun-Mi (born 15 March 1986) is a South Korean female volleyball player. She was part of the South Korea women's national volleyball team.

She participated at the 2009 FIVB Women's World Grand Champions Cup. On club level she played for GS Caltex in 2009.
