= Annamaria Quaranta =

Italian volleyball player (born 1981)

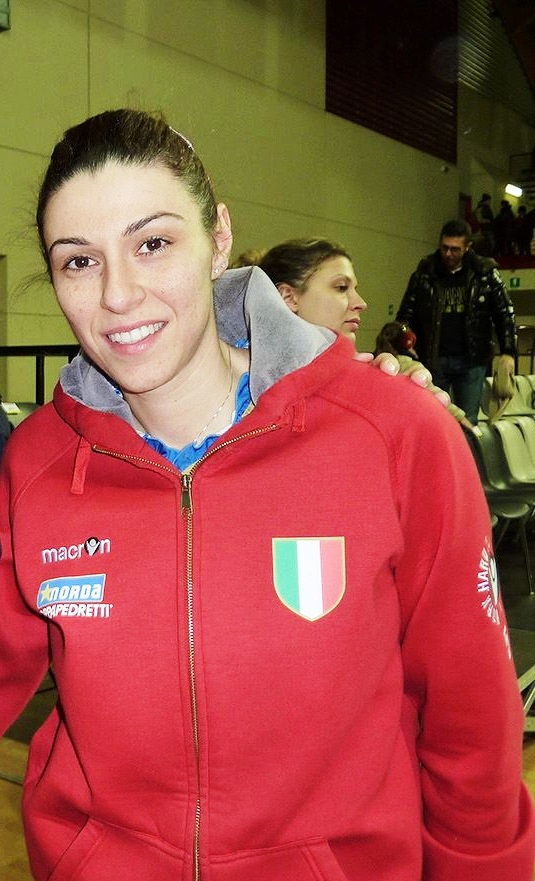

Personal information
- Nationality: Italian
- Born: 19 October 1981 (age 45)
- Height: 1.84 m (6 ft 0 in)
- Weight: 67 kg (148 lb)
- Spike: 305 cm (120 in)
- Block: 280 cm (110 in)

Volleyball information
- Position: outside hitter/opposite
- Number: 1

Career
Years	Teams
2010	(Italy) Pallavolo Sirio Perugia

National team
2010	Italy

Annamaria Quaranta (born 19 October 1981) is an Italian female former volleyball player. She was part of the Italy women's national volleyball team.

She participated in the 2010 FIVB Volleyball Women's World Championship. She played with Pallavolo Sirio Perugia.

== Clubs ==
- (Italy) Pallavolo Sirio Perugia (2010)

== Sources ==
- "Giocatrice – Lega Pallavolo Serie A Femminile". Legavolleyfemminile.it.
- "CEV - Confédération Européenne de Volleyball". Cev.lu. Archived from the original on 30 March 2017.
- Matteo Magri. "La Quaranta: addio volley io mi laureo - Corriere Bergamo". Bergamo.corriere.it.
