= Cristina Barcellini =

Italian volleyball player (born 1986)

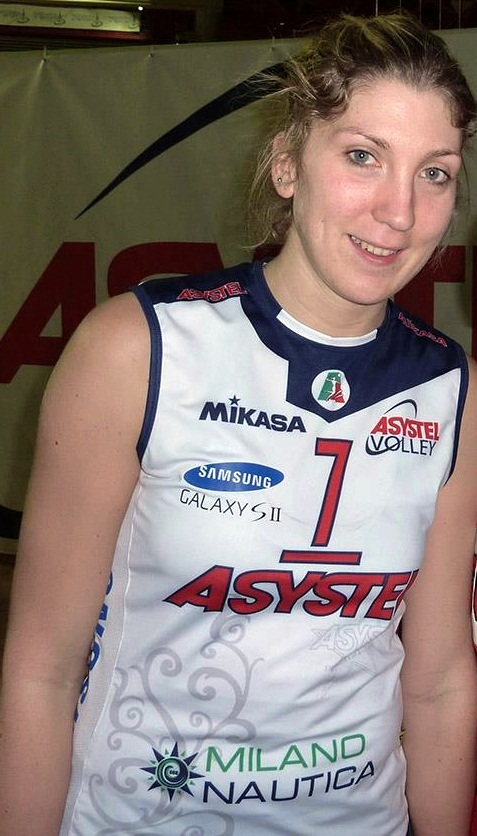

Personal information
- Nationality: Italian
- Born: 20 November 1986 (age 39); Novara, Italy
- Height: 1.83 m (6 ft 0 in)
- Weight: 78 kg (172 lb)
- Spike: 307 cm (121 in)
- Block: 292 cm (115 in)

Volleyball information
- Position: outside hitter
- Number: 2

Career
Years	Teams
2010	(Italy) Asystel Novara

National team
2010	Italy

Cristina Barcellini (born 20 November 1986) is a retired Italian female volleyball player.

She was part of the Italy women's national volleyball team at the 2009 FIVB Women's World Grand Champions Cup, and at the 2010 FIVB Volleyball Women's World Championship in Japan. She played with Asystel Novara.

== Clubs ==
- (Italy) Asystel Novara (2010)
