= Pallavolo Sirio Perugia =

Italian women's volleyball club

- Full name: Pallavolo Sirio S.p.a.
- Founded: 1970
- Dissolved: 2011
- Ground: PalaEvangelisti, Perugia, Italy (Capacity: 3,800)
- Website: Club home page

Uniforms
Home	Away

Pallavolo Sirio Perugia was an Italian women's volleyball club based in Perugia. The club had success at national and international level during the years it was active.

== Previous names ==
Due to sponsorship, the club have competed under the following names:

- Imet Perugia (1991–1992)
- Rasimelli&Coletti Perugia (1992–1993)
- Despar Perugia (1993–1994)
- Despar Sirio Perugia (1994–1995)
- Despar Perugia (1995–2001)
- Despar Colussi Perugia (2001–2002)
- Despar Perugia (2002–2003)
- Despar Sirio Perugia (2003–2004)
- Despar Perugia (2004–2011)

== History ==
The club was created in 1970 in Perugia. It made its way through the lower leagues in Italy until it reached the highest Italian league, the Serie A1 in 1989. The first major title came at the 1991–92 Italian Cup, at the same season the club finished as Serie A1 runner up for a second consecutive year. The early 1990s strong results paved the way to the European competitions but it was only by the end of that decade and the early 2000s that the club transformed strong results into titles. A second Italian Cup title came in 1998–99, the first European title in the 1999–00 Cup Winners Cup and the first Serie A1 title arrived in 2002–03 together with a third Italian Cup. The double (league and cup) was repeated in 2004–05 with the club also taking the CEV Cup that season. In the following season it claimed the CEV Champions League title and in 2006–07 the club won the double (for a third time) and CEV Cup just like it did two seasons earlier. It added an Italian Supercup in 2007 and second Champions League in 2007–08.

In 2011 the club restructured itself, after the president decided to focus only on the youth teams and the club renounced participation on the 2011–12 Serie A1 season. A new club called Sirio Perugia Volley was created and, in collaboration with three clubs (APD Monteluce, San Sisto Volley and Pallavolo San Sisto), formed the Pallavolo Perugia group.

== Team ==
The club's last team of the 2010–11 season. As of September 2010

Number	Player	Position	Height (m)	Birth date
1	(Russia) Olga Fateeva	Opposite	1.90	04/05/1984
2	(Italy) Annamaria Quaranta	Outside hitter	1.84	19/10/1981
4	(Italy) Manuela Leggeri	Middle blocker	1.86	09/05/1976
6	(Serbia) Ivana Luković	Opposite	1.90	18/07/1992
7	(Ukraine) Olesia Rykhliuk	Ouitside Hitter	1.94	11/12/1987
8	(Italy) Beatrice Sacco	Libero	1.69	07/06/1983
9	(Italy) Chiara Arcangeli	Libero	1.67	14/02/1983
11	(Croatia) Sanja Popović	Outside hitter	1.86	31/05/1984
12	(Italy) Veronica Angeloni	Outside hitter	1.86	06/07/1986
13	(Italy) Kseniya Ihnatsiuk	Middle blocker	1.84	17/08/1989
14	(Italy) Cinzia Callegaro	Setter	1.75	02/07/1975
17	(Italy) Giulia Rondon	Setter	1.89	16/10/1987

Coach: (Argentina) Claudio César Cuello

== Notable players ==
- (Italy) Taismary Aguero (2001-2005)
- (Italy) Mirka Francia (2000-2008)
- (Italy) Simona Gioli (2002-2008)
- (Italy) Antonella Del Core (2006-2008)
- (Italy) Paola Croce (2001-2004)
- (Italy) Elisa Togut (2008-2009)
- (Turkey) Neriman Özsoy (2010-2012)
- (Poland) Dorota Swieniewicz (1997-2006)
- (Croatia) Irina Kirillova (2001-2004)
- (Brazil) Fofão (2004-2007)
- (Brazil) Walewska Oliveira (2004-2007)
- (United States) Nancy Metcalf (2003-2004)
- (Germany) Hanka Pachale (2007-2008)
- (Bulgaria) Antonina Zetova (2005-2007/2009-2010)
- (Bulgaria) Neli Marinova (2007-2008)
- (Cuba) Regla Torres (1998-2000)
- (Cuba) Regla Bell (1998-2000)
- (China) Yang Hao (2008-2009)
- (Puerto Rico) Karina Ocasio (2003-2004)

|}

== Honours ==
=== National competitions ===
- National League: 3

2002–03, 2004–05, 2006–07

- Coppa Italia: 5

1991–92, 1998–99, 2002–03, 2004–05, 2006–07

- Italian Super Cup: 1

2007

=== International competitions ===
- CEV Champions League: 2

2005–06, 2007–08

- Cup Winners Cup: 1

1999–00

- CEV Cup: 2

2004–05, 2006–07
