= Mirka Francia =

Cuban-Italian volleyball player

Personal information
- Full name: Mirka Francia Vasconcelos
- Nationality: Cuban/Italian
- Born: 14 February 1975 (age 51) Santa Clara, Cuba
- Home town: Perugia
- Height: 1.84 m (6 ft 0 in)
- Weight: 73 kg (161 lb)
- Spike: 3.24 m (128 in)
- Block: 3.10 m (122 in)

Volleyball information
- Position: Middle blocker (Cuban national team) / Wing spiker
- Number: 16 (Cuban national team)

National team
- Years: Team
- 1991–2000: Cuba
Honours
Women's volleyball
Representing Cuba
Olympic Games
Gold medal – first place	1996 Atlanta	Team
Gold medal – first place	2000 Sydney	Team
World Championship
Gold medal – first place	1994 Brazil	Team
Gold medal – first place	1998 Japan	Team
FIVB World Cup
Gold medal – first place	1999 Japan	Team
World Grand Champions Cup
Silver medal – second place	1997 Tokyo
World Grand Prix
Gold medal – first place	1993	Team
Gold medal – first place	2000	Team
Silver medal – second place	1994	Team
Silver medal – second place	1996	Team
Silver medal – second place	1997	Team
Bronze medal – third place	1995	Team
Bronze medal – third place	1998	Team
NORCECA Championship
Gold medal – first place	1991 Regina
Gold medal – first place	1993 Colorado Springs
Gold medal – first place	1995 Santo Domingo
Gold medal – first place	1997 Caguas
Gold medal – first place	1999 Monterrey
Pan American Games
Gold medal – first place	1991 Havana	Team
Gold medal – first place	1995 Mar Del Plata	Team
Silver medal – second place	1999 Winnipeg	Team
Central American and Caribbean Games
Gold medal – first place	1998 Maracaibo	Team

Mirka Francia Vasconcelos (born 14 February 1975) is a Cuban-Italian retired volleyball player who won two Olympic gold medals with the Cuban women's national volleyball team. At 1.84 m (6 ft) tall, she played as a middle blocker before transitioning to an outside hitter later in her career.

Francia was inducted into the International Volleyball Hall of Fame in 2019.

== National team ==
Born in Santa Clara, Cuba, Francia first played volleyball at age nine, and joined the junior national team in Havana four years later. She won gold medals with the national team at the 1996 Summer Olympics in Atlanta and at the 2000 Summer Olympics in Sydney. She played on the national team that won the FIVB World Championship in 1994 and 1998. She also helped Cuba win the gold medal at the 1995 Pan American Games and the silver medal at the 1999 Pan American Games.

== Club volleyball ==
In the 1998–99 season, Francia played for Romanelli Firenze in the Italian second division before joining Sirio Perugia for the following season. She skipped the 2000–01 season because of pregnancy, but rejoined Sirio Perugia the next year. With the team, she won the Italian Championship three times (2002–03, 2004–05, 2006–07) and the Italian Cup two times (2003, 2005). She also won the CEV Champions League title in 2006 and 2008, and was selected as the "Best Spiker" on both occasions. She then won the 2007 CEV Cup title, and was selected as the "Best Scorer". She acquired Italian citizenship in 2004.

For the 2008–09 season, Francia played for the Turkish team Eczacibasi Istanbul. With this team, she won the "Best Scorer" title for the Champions League regular 2009 season; and the "Best Spiker", "Best Server", and "Top Scorer" of the 2009 Turkish Championship.

== Clubs ==
- Romanelli Firenze (1998–1999)
- Sirio Perugia (1999–2008)
- Eczacibasi Zentiva Istanbul (2008–2012)
- Top Quality Group San Giustino (2014–2016)

== Awards ==
=== Individuals ===
- 1999 FIVB World Cup "Best Blocker"
- 2008 Champions League Final Four "Best Spiker"
- 2009 Champions League Regular Season "Best Scorer"
- 2009 Turkish Championship "Top Scorer"
- 2009 Turkish Championship "Best Spiker"
- 2009 Turkish Championship "Best Server"

=== Clubs ===
- 2000 Copa Coppe – Champion, with Despar Perugia
- 2003 Italian Cup – Champion, with Despar Perugia
- 2003 Italian Championship – Champion, with Despar Perugia
- 2005 Italian Cup – Champion, with Sirio Perugia
- 2005 CEV Cup – Champion, with Sirio Perugia
- 2005 Italian Championship – Champion, with Sirio Perugia
- 2005–06 CEV Indesit Champions League – Champion, with Sirio Perugia
- 2006 Coppa di Lega – Champion, with Sirio Perugia
- 2007 Italian Cup – Champion, with Sirio Perugia
- 2007 CEV Cup – Champion, with Sirio Perugia
- 2007 Italian Championship – Champion, with Sirio Perugia
- 2007 Italian Super Cup – Champion, with Sirio Perugia
- 2007–08 CEV Indesit Champions League – Champion, with Colussi Perugia
- 2009 Turkish Championship – Runner-Up, with Eczacibasi Zentiva Istanbul
- 2011 Turkish Cup – Champion, with Eczacıbaşı VitrA
