= Fofão (volleyball player) =

Brazilian volleyball player

Hélia Souza
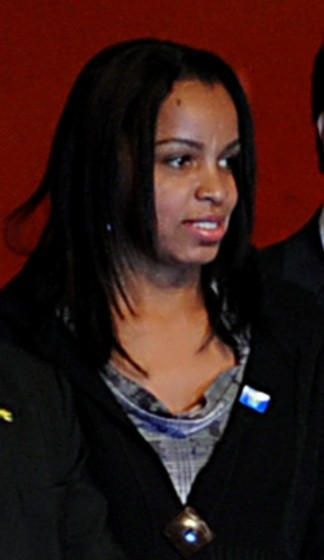
- Fofão in 2010

Personal information
- Full name: Hélia Rogério de Souza Pinto
- Nickname: Fofão
- Born: 10 March 1970 (age 56); São Paulo, SP, Brazil
- Height: 1.73 m (5 ft 8 in)
- Weight: 63 kg (139 lb)
- Spike: 283 cm (111 in)
- Block: 264 cm (104 in)

Volleyball information
- Position: Setter
- Current club: Retired
- Number: 15 (1992–1996); 7 (1999–2008)

National team
1991–2008	Brazil
Honours
Women's volleyball
Representing Brazil
Olympic Games
Gold medal – first place	2008 Beijing	Team
Bronze medal – third place	1996 Atlanta	Team
Bronze medal – third place	2000 Sidney	Team
World Championship
Silver medal – second place	1994 Brazil	Team
Silver medal – second place	2006 Japan	Team
FIVB World Cup
Silver medal – second place	1995 Japan	Team
Silver medal – second place	2003 Japan	Team
Silver medal – second place	2007 Japan	Team
Bronze medal – third place	1999 Japan	Team
World Grand Champions Cup
Bronze medal – third place	1997 Japan	Team
FIVB World Grand Prix
Gold medal – first place	1994 Shanghai	Team
Gold medal – first place	1996 Shanghai	Team
Gold medal – first place	1998 Hong Kong	Team
Gold medal – first place	2004 Reggio Calabria	Team
Gold medal – first place	2005 Sendai	Team
Gold medal – first place	2006 Reggio Calabria	Team
Gold medal – first place	2008 Yokohama	Team
Silver medal – second place	1995 Shanghai	Team
Silver medal – second place	1999 Yu Xi	Team
Bronze medal – third place	2000 Manila	Team
Pan American Games
Gold medal – first place	1999 Winnipeg	Team
Silver medal – second place	1991 Havana	Team
Silver medal – second place	2007 Rio de Janeiro	Team
Final Four Cup
Gold medal – first place	2008 Fortaleza	Team
CSV South American Championship
Gold medal – first place	1991 Osasco
Gold medal – first place	1995 Porto Alegre
Gold medal – first place	1997 Lima
Gold medal – first place	1999 Valencia
Gold medal – first place	2003 Bogotá
Gold medal – first place	2007 Rancagua / Santiago
Silver medal – second place	1993 Cusco

Hélia Rogério de Souza (born 10 March 1970), nicknamed Fofão, is a Brazilian female retired volleyball player who competed for her country's national team in five consecutive Summer Olympics, starting in 1992. She won a gold medal in 2008 and twice won a bronze medal, in 1996 and 2000. She also claimed the gold medal at the 1999 Pan American Games.

She is nicknamed Fofão because of her large cheeks similar to a famous character of a 1980s children's TV program in Brazil named "Fofão".

== Career ==
Fofão participated at the 1999 FIVB Volleyball Women's World Cup. She won the 2006–07 CEV Cup with the Italian club Sirio Perugia and was awarded Best Setter. The next season with Grupo 2002 Murcia she was awarded "Best Setter" at the 2007–08 CEV Indesit Champions League.

Fofão retired from the Brazil national team on 7 September 2008, after helping her country beat Dominican Republic 3-0 and won the Final Four competition. From 1991, when she played her first game for Brazil, to 2008, she played 340 games for the national team.

Fofão signed with the Turkish club Fenerbahçe Acıbadem since 4 July 2010.

Fofão won the bronze medal at the 2010–11 CEV Champions League with Fenerbahçe Acıbadem.

Fofão won the silver medal at the 2013 Club World Championship playing with Unilever Vôlei.

During the 2015 FIVB Club World Championship, Fofão played with the Brazilian club Rexona Ades Rio and her team lost the bronze medal match to the Swiss Voléro Zürich. At age 45, this was Fofao's last match, after which she announced her retirement.

== Clubs ==
- (Brazil) Pão de Açúcar E.C. (1985–1987)
- (Brazil) Pão de Açúcar/Paineiras E.C. (1988–1990)
- (Brazil) Colgate-Pão de Açúcar/São Caetano E.C. (1990–1992)
- (Brazil) Colgate/São Caetano E.C. (1992–1994)
- (Brazil) Sollo/Tietê E.C. (1994–1995)
- (Brazil) Transmontano/J.C. Amaral (1995–1996)
- (Brazil) UNIBAN/São Caetano E.C. (1996–1998)
- (Brazil) UNIBAN/São Bernardo (1998–1999)
- (Brazil) MRV/Minas (1999–2003)
- (Brazil) Rexona-Ades (2003–2004)
- (Italy) Sirio Perugia (2004–2007)
- (Spain) Grupo 2002 Murcia (2007–2008)
- (Brazil) São Caetano/Blausiegel (2008–2010)
- (Turkey) Fenerbahçe Acıbadem Istanbul (2010–2011)
- (Brazil) Unilever Vôlei (2012-2014)
- (Brazil) Rexona Ades Rio (2014–2015)

== Awards ==
=== Individuals ===
- 1998 FIVB World Grand Prix "Best Setter"
- 1999 FIVB World Grand Prix "Best Setter"
- 1999 Pan-American Games "Best Setter"
- 1999 Pan-American Games "Most Valuable Player"
- 2000 FIVB World Grand Prix "Best Setter"
- 2000 Summer Olympics "Best Setter"
- 2006–07 CEV Cup "Best Setter"
- 2007–08 CEV Champions League "Best Setter"
- 2007 FIVB World Cup "Best Setter"
- 2007 Pan-American Games "Best Setter"
- 2008 Final Four Cup "Most Valuable Player"
- 2008 Final Four Cup "Best Setter"
- 2008 Summer Olympics "Best Setter"

== Clubs ==
- 1998/1999 Brazilian Championship - Champion, with UNIBAN/São Bernardo
- 2001 South American Clubs Championship - Champion, with MRV/Minas
- 2001/2002 Brazilian Championship - Champion, with MRV/Minas
- 2005 Italian Championship - Champion, with Despar Perugia
- 2005 Italian Cup - Champion, with Despar Colussi Perugia
- 2004–05 CEV Cup - Champion, with Sirio Perugia
- 2005–06 CEV Indesit Champions League - Champion, with Sirio Perugia
- 2006 Italian Cup - Champion, with Despar Perugia
- 2007 Italian Championship - Champion, with Despar Perugia
- 2007 Italian Cup - Champion, with Despar Colussi Perugia
- 2006–07 CEV Cup - Champion, with Sirio Perugia
- 2007 Spanish Super Cup - Champion, with Grupo 2002 Murcia
- 2007–08 Spanish Queen's Cup - Champion, with Grupo 2002 Murcia
- 2007–08 Spanish Championship - Champion, with Grupo 2002 Murcia
- 2010 Turkish Super Cup - Champion, with Fenerbahçe Acıbadem
- 2010 FIVB World Club Championship - Champion, with Fenerbahçe Acıbadem
- 2010–11 CEV Champions League - Bronze medal, with Fenerbahçe Acıbadem
- 2010–11 Aroma Women's Volleyball League - Champion, with Fenerbahçe Acıbadem
- 2013 Club World Championship - Runner-up, with Unilever Vôlei
- 2013/2014 Superliga - Champion, with Unilever Vôlei
- 2015 South American Clubs Championship - Champion, with Unilever Vôlei
- 2014/2015 Superliga - Champion, with Unilever Vôlei

Awards
Preceded by (Brazil) Ana Flávia Sanglard	Best Setter of FIVB World Grand Prix; 1999, 2000	Succeeded by (United States) Robyn Ah Mow
