= Francona =

Francona is an Italian surname. Notable people with the surname include:

- Rick Francona (born 1951), American author, commentator, media military analyst and retired U.S. Air Force officer, cousin of Terry Francona
- Terry Francona (born 1959), American Major League Baseball manager
- Tito Francona (1933–2018), American Major League Baseball player, father of Terry Francona

== See also ==
- Franconia (disambiguation)
