= Chiara Arcangeli =

Italian volleyball player (born 1983)

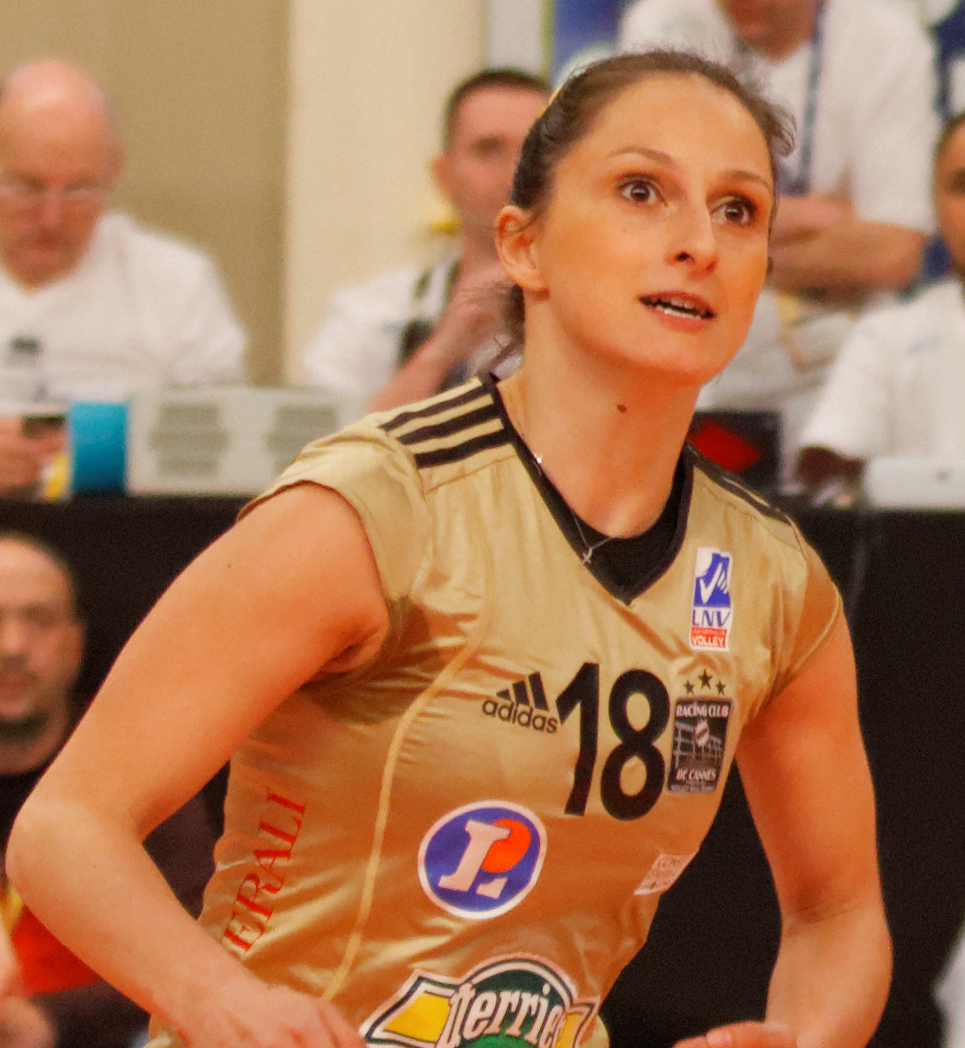

Personal information
- Nationality: Italian
- Born: 14 February 1983 (age 43)
- Height: 1.67 m (5 ft 6 in)
- Weight: 57 kg (126 lb)
- Spike: 278 cm (109 in)
- Block: 262 cm (103 in)

Volleyball information
- Position: libero
- Number: 6

Career
Years	Teams
2010	(Italy) Pallavolo Sirio Perugia

National team
2010	Italy

Chiara Arcangeli (born 14 February 1983) is a retired Italian female volleyball player.

She was part of the Italy women's national volleyball team at the 2010 FIVB Volleyball Women's World Championship in Japan. She played with Pallavolo Sirio Perugia. After coming up through Pallavolo Sirio Perugia youth teams she would play for the majority of her career there until leaving after the 2010–11 season. She took a year out in 2011 while she was pregnant and then went over to play in France for RC Cannes in 2012–13 before playing back in Italy for LJ Volley Modena in 2014–15. She then signed for newly promoted side Saugella Team Monza as their libero in 2016 and helped them win the 2018–19 CEV Women's Challenge Cup. The clubs first ever cup.

== Clubs ==
- (Italy) Pallavolo Sirio Perugia (2010)
