= Paola Cardullo =

Italian volleyball player (born 1982)

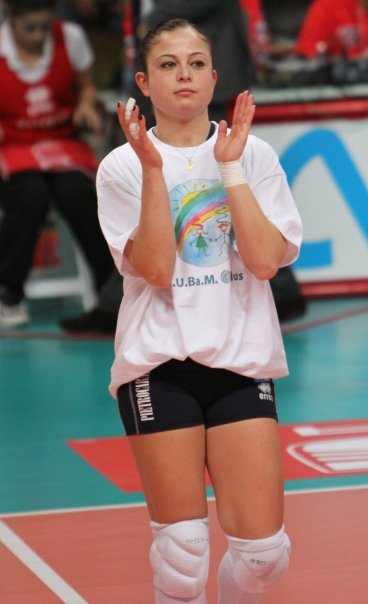

Personal information
- Full name: Paola Cardullo
- Nationality: Italian
- Born: 18 March 1982 (age 44); Omegna, Italy
- Height: 1.62 m (5 ft 4 in)
- Weight: 56 kg (123 lb)
- Spike: 275 cm (108 in)
- Block: 268 cm (106 in)

Volleyball information
- Position: Libero

National team
2001 – 2014	(Italy)
Honours
Women's volleyball
Representing Italy
FIVB World Championship
Gold medal – first place	2002 Germany	Team
World Grand Champions Cup
Gold medal – first place	2009 Tokyo/Fukuoka	Team
FIVB World Cup
Gold medal – first place	2007 Japan	Team
FIVB World Grand Prix
Silver medal – second place	2004 Reggio Calabria	Team
Silver medal – second place	2005 Sendai	Team
Bronze medal – third place	2006 Reggio Calabria	Team
Bronze medal – third place	2008 Yokohama	Team
European Championship
Gold medal – first place	2007 Belgium-Luxembourg	Team
Gold medal – first place	2009 Poland	Team
Silver medal – second place	2001 Bulgaria	Team
Silver medal – second place	2005 Croatia	Team

Paola Cardullo (born 18 March 1982 in Omegna) is a former volleyball player from Italy, who was a member of the Women's National Team that won the gold medal at the 2007 European Championship in Belgium and Luxembourg. There she was named Best Libero of the tournament.

== Career ==
Cardullo also competed at the 2004 Summer Olympics in Athens, Greece, where Italy ended up in fifth place and she was named Best Libero at the end of the Olympic tournament.

She won the bronze medal at the 2007–08 CEV Indesit Champions League with Asystel Novara and also was individually awarded Best Libero. In the 2012-12 champions league, Cardullo played with the French club RC Cannes, capturing the silver medal and the Best Libero award.

Cardullo played with her national team at the 2014 World Championship. There her team ended up in fourth place after losing 2-3 to Brazil the bronze medal match.

== Clubs ==
- (Italy) Pallavolo Omegna (1996–1999)
- (Italy) AGIL Trecate (1999–2001)
- (Italy) Asystel Novara (2001–2009)
- (Italy) Villa Cortese (2009–2011)
- (France) RC Cannes (2011–2012)
- (Italy) Asystel MC Carnaghi (2012–2013)
- (Italy) LJ Volley (2013–2014)
- (Italy) Volley 2002 Forlì (2014–2014)
- (Italy) River Piacenza (2014–2015)
- (Italy) Volley Bergamo (2015–2018)
- (Italy) Polisportiva Filottrano Pallavolo (2018–2019)
- (Italy) Pallavolo Scandicci (2019–2020)

== Awards ==
=== Individuals ===
- 2002 World Championship "Fair Play Award"
- 2002–03 CEV Challenge Cup "Best Libero"
- 2003 World Grand Prix "Most Valuable Player"
- 2004 FIVB World Grand Prix "Most Popular Player"
- 2004 Olympic Games "Best Libero"
- 2004–05 CEV Champions League "Best Libero"
- 2005–06 Women's CEV Cup "Best Libero"
- 2007 FIVB World Cup "Best Libero"
- 2007 European Championship "Best Libero"
- 2007–08 CEV Indesit Champions League Final Four "Best Libero"
- 2009 European Championships "Best Libero"
- 2011–12 CEV Champions League "Best Libero"

== Clubs ==
- 2002–03 CEV Challenge Cup - Champions, with AGIL Novara
- 2003 Italian Supercup - Champions, with Asystel Novara
- 2004 Italian Cup— Champions, with Asystel Novara
- 2005 Italian Supercup - Champions, with Asystel Novara
- 2005–06 Women's CEV Cup - Champions, with Asystel Novara
- 2008–09 Women's CEV Cup - Champions, with Asystel Novara
- 2010 Italian Cup— Champions, with GSO Villa Cortese
- 2011 Italian Cup— Champions, with GSO Villa Cortese
- 2011–12 CEV Champions League— Runner-Up, with RC Cannes

Awards
Preceded by (Russia) Yevgeniya Artamonova	Most Valuable Player of FIVB World Grand Prix; 2003	Succeeded by (United States) Logan Tom
