= 2007 FIVB Volleyball Women's World Cup =

Volleyball competition held in Japan

Tournament details
- Host country: Japan
- Dates: 2–16 November
- Teams: 12
- Venues: 8 (in 7 host cities)

Final positions
- Champions: Italy (1st title)
- Runners-up: Brazil
- Third place: United States

Tournament awards
- MVP: (Italy) Simona Gioli

The 2007 FIVB Women's World Cup was held from 2 to 16 November 2007 in Japan.

== Teams ==
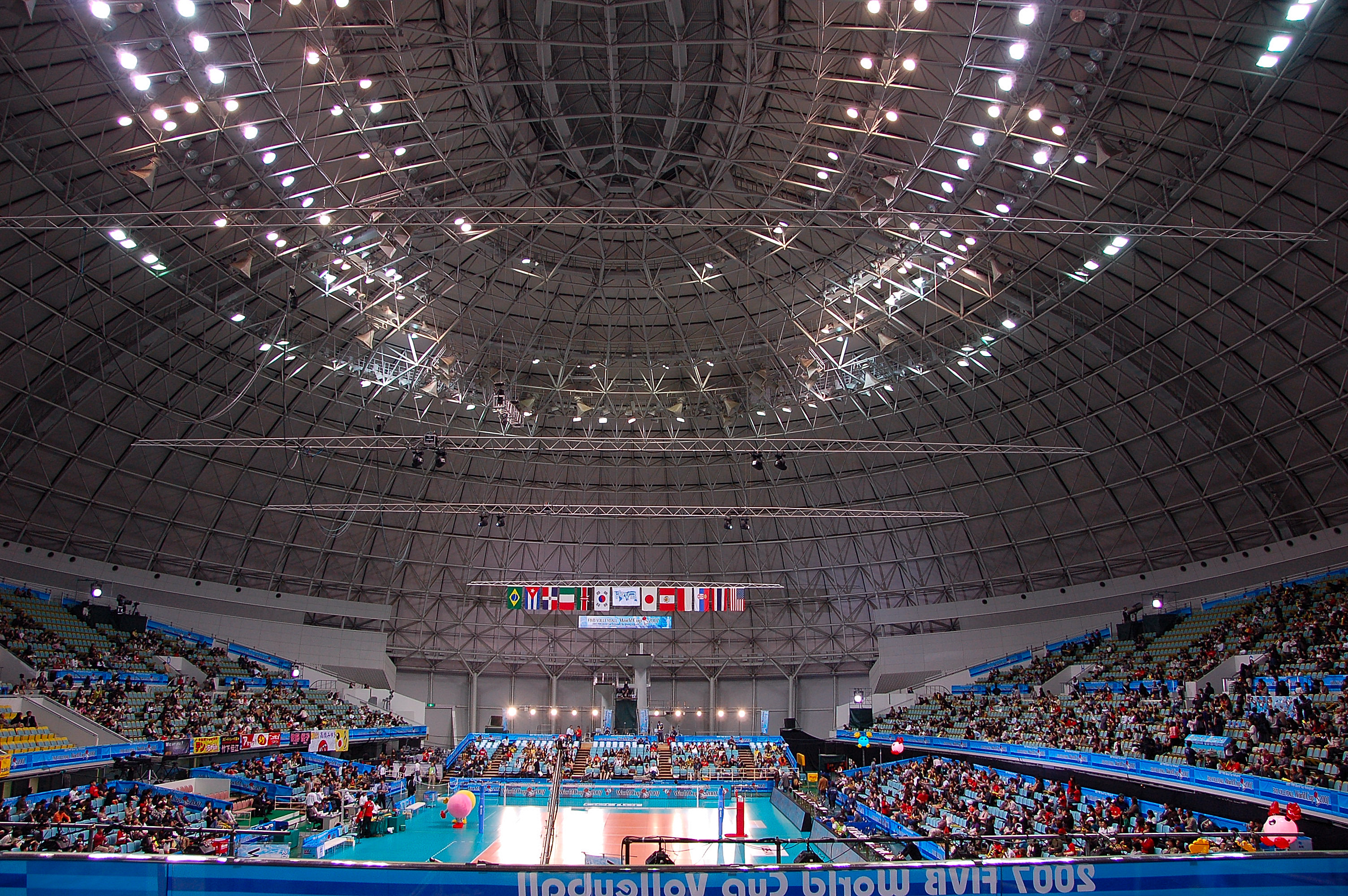
2007

12 teams participated in the World Cup:

- The five champions of their respective continental championships in 2007: Cuba, Italy, Brazil, Kenya, Thailand
- Four highest-ranked second-place teams of their respective continental championships in 2007: South Korea, United States, Serbia, Peru
- The host nation's team: Japan
- Two wild cards chosen from among the participants of the continental championships in 2007: Poland, Dominican Republic

== Venues ==
Round	Site A	Site B
1st	Tokyo Metropolitan Gymnasium, Tokyo	Hamamatsu Arena, Hamamatsu
2nd	Namihaya Dome, Kadoma	Sendai Gymnasium, Sendai
3rd	Hokkaido Prefectural Sports Center, Sapporo	Kumamoto Prefectural Gymnasium, Kumamoto
4th	Nippon Gaishi Hall, Nagoya	Park Arena Komaki, Komaki

== Format ==
The competition system of the 2007 World Cup is the single Round-Robin system. Each team plays once against each of the 11 remaining teams. Points are accumulated during the whole tournament, and the final ranking is determined by the total points gained.

Rounds 1 + 2 (30 matches, 5 days): 12 participating teams have been divided in 2 groups (Site A & Site B)
Rounds 3 + 4 (36 matches, 6 days): teams have continued to play against the remaining teams of the other groups.

== Results ==
Pos	Team	Pld	W	L	Pts	SW	SL	SR	SPW	SPL	SPR
1	Italy	11	11	0	22	33	2	16.500	858	604	1.421
2	Brazil	11	9	2	20	29	9	3.222	891	671	1.328
3	United States	11	9	2	20	28	13	2.154	940	821	1.145
4	Cuba	11	8	3	19	28	17	1.647	1020	951	1.073
5	Serbia	11	7	4	18	26	15	1.733	910	866	1.051
6	Poland	11	6	5	17	23	18	1.278	908	820	1.107
7	Japan	11	6	5	17	21	19	1.105	885	866	1.022
8	South Korea	11	4	7	15	16	22	0.727	825	848	0.973
9	Dominican Republic	11	3	8	14	12	28	0.429	797	911	0.875
10	Thailand	11	2	9	13	11	29	0.379	784	924	0.848
11	Peru	11	1	10	12	6	30	0.200	681	855	0.796
12	Kenya	11	0	11	11	2	33	0.061	498	860	0.579

All times are Japan Standard Time (UTC+09:00).

=== First round ===
==== Site A ====
Date	Time		Score		Set 1	Set 2	Set 3	Set 4	Set 5	Total	Report
2 Nov	13:35	South Korea	0–3	Serbia	21–25	23–25	15–25			59–75	P2 P3
2 Nov	16:05	Italy	3–0	Thailand	25–14	25–14	25–16			75–44	P2 P3
2 Nov	19:30	Japan	3–0	Dominican Republic	25–23	25–18	25–20			75–61	P2 P3
3 Nov	12:35	Serbia	3–1	Thailand	25–20	18–25	25–17	26–24		94–86	P2 P3
3 Nov	15:05	Dominican Republic	0–3	Italy	17–25	16–25	17–25			50–75	P2 P3
3 Nov	18:00	Japan	3–1	South Korea	25–23	19–25	25–22	25–16		94–86	P2 P3
4 Nov	12:35	Dominican Republic	3–2	Thailand	25–14	25–21	23–25	19–25	17–15	109–100	P2 P3
4 Nov	15:05	Italy	3–0	South Korea	25–15	25–19	25–22			75–56	P2 P3
4 Nov	18:00	Japan	1–3	Serbia	20–25	20–25	25–18	24–26		89–94	P2 P3

==== Site B ====
Date	Time		Score		Set 1	Set 2	Set 3	Set 4	Set 5	Total	Report
2 Nov	13:35	Cuba	3–0	Kenya	25–11	25–18	25–20			75–49	P2 P3
2 Nov	16:05	Peru	0–3	United States	23–25	14–25	19–25			56–75	P2 P3
2 Nov	19:35	Brazil	3–0	Poland	25–12	25–20	25–22			75–54	P2 P3
3 Nov	12:35	Cuba	2–3	United States	25–20	21–25	18–25	25–20	11–15	100–105	P2 P3
3 Nov	15:05	Peru	0–3	Poland	17–25	17–25	16–25			50–75	P2 P3
3 Nov	18:05	Brazil	3–0	Kenya	25–16	25–7	25–14			75–37	P2 P3
4 Nov	12:35	Kenya	0–3	Peru	16–25	9–25	19–25			44–75	P2 P3
4 Nov	15:05	Brazil	3–2	Cuba	25–19	19–25	25–17	19–25	15–11	103–97	P2 P3
4 Nov	18:05	Poland	1–3	United States	21–25	25–12	25–27	17–25		88–89	P2 P3

=== Second round ===
==== Site A ====
Date	Time		Score		Set 1	Set 2	Set 3	Set 4	Set 5	Total	Report
6 Nov	12:35	Italy	3–2	Serbia	23–25	25–14	16–25	25–17	15–7	104–88	P2 P3
6 Nov	15:05	Dominican Republic	1–3	South Korea	24–26	25–22	20–25	21–25		90–98	P2 P3
6 Nov	18:00	Japan	3–0	Thailand	25–19	27–25	25–14			77–58	P2 P3
7 Nov	12:35	South Korea	3–0	Thailand	25–21	25–20	25–21			75–62	P2 P3
7 Nov	15:05	Dominican Republic	0–3	Serbia	22–25	14–25	23–25			59–75	P2 P3
7 Nov	18:00	Japan	0–3	Italy	18–25	19–25	14–25			51–75	P2 P3

==== Site B ====
Date	Time		Score		Set 1	Set 2	Set 3	Set 4	Set 5	Total	Report
6 Nov	12:35	Kenya	0–3	United States	9–25	20–25	10–25			39–75	P2 P3
6 Nov	15:05	Cuba	3–2	Poland	21–25	26–24	22–25	25–21	15–13	109–108	P2 P3
6 Nov	18:05	Brazil	3–0	Peru	25–17	25–15	25–17			75–49	P2 P3
7 Nov	12:35	Kenya	0–3	Poland	12–25	10–25	15–25			37–75	P2 P3
7 Nov	15:05	Cuba	3–0	Peru	29–27	25–19	25–13			79–59	P2 P3
7 Nov	18:05	Brazil	2–3	United States	25–17	25–16	21–25	23–25	9–15	103–98	P2 P3

=== Third round ===
==== Site A ====
Date	Time		Score		Set 1	Set 2	Set 3	Set 4	Set 5	Total	Report
9 Nov	14:05	Italy	3–0	Poland	25–15	25–15	25–18			75–48	P2 P3
9 Nov	16:35	Kenya	0–3	Serbia	15–25	16–25	10–25			41–75	P2 P3
9 Nov	19:30	Japan	3–1	Peru	25–18	25–13	22–25	25–19		97–75	P2 P3
10 Nov	14:05	Italy	3–0	Kenya	25–13	25–13	25–5			75–31	P2 P3
10 Nov	16:35	Peru	0–3	Serbia	15–25	15–25	23–25			53–75	P2 P3
10 Nov	19:30	Japan	3–2	Poland	19–25	25–23	18–25	25–22	15–12	102–107	P2 P3
11 Nov	12:35	Italy	3–0	Peru	25–13	25–21	25–17			75–51	P2 P3
11 Nov	15:05	Poland	3–2	Serbia	24–26	25–23	25–12	19–25	15–10	108–96	P2 P3
11 Nov	18:00	Japan	3–0	Kenya	25–14	25–12	25–8			75–34	P2 P3

==== Site B ====
Date	Time		Score		Set 1	Set 2	Set 3	Set 4	Set 5	Total	Report
9 Nov	12:35	Brazil	3–0	Thailand	25–12	25–13	25–20			75–45	P2 P3
9 Nov	15:05	Dominican Republic	1–3	United States	16–25	25–20	16–25	18–25		75–95	P2 P3
9 Nov	18:05	Cuba	3–2	South Korea	25–20	17–25	19–25	25–21	15–10	101–101	P2 P3
10 Nov	12:35	Cuba	3–1	Dominican Republic	25–13	25–27	25–23	25–18		100–81	P2 P3
10 Nov	15:05	Thailand	1–3	United States	25–21	19–25	11–25	13–25		68–96	P2 P3
10 Nov	18:05	Brazil	3–0	South Korea	25–15	25–17	25–17			75–49	P2 P3
11 Nov	12:35	Cuba	3–1	Thailand	25–22	23–25	25–22	25–13		98–82	P2 P3
11 Nov	15:05	South Korea	0–3	United States	21–25	19–25	23–25			63–75	P2 P3
11 Nov	18:05	Brazil	3–0	Dominican Republic	25–16	25–12	25–14			75–42	P2 P3

=== Fourth round ===
==== Site A ====
Date	Time		Score		Set 1	Set 2	Set 3	Set 4	Set 5	Total	Report
14 Nov	14:05	Brazil	0–3	Italy	20–25	23–25	19–25			62–75	P2 P3
14 Nov	16:35	Serbia	3–1	United States	28–26	23–25	25–20	25–23		101–94	P2 P3
14 Nov	19:30	Japan	1–3	Cuba	25–22	29–31	23–25	20–25		97–103	P2 P3
15 Nov	12:35	Brazil	3–0	Serbia	25–13	25–14	25–21			75–48	P2 P3
15 Nov	15:05	Cuba	0–3	Italy	25–27	19–25	16–25			60–77	P2 P3
15 Nov	18:00	Japan	0–3	United States	17–25	14–25	20–25			51–75	P2 P3
16 Nov	12:35	Cuba	3–1	Serbia	23–25	25–22	25–20	25–22		98–89	P2 P3
16 Nov	15:05	Italy	3–0	United States	25–20	25–18	27–25			77–63	P2 P3
16 Nov	18:00	Japan	1–3	Brazil	16–25	25–23	18–25	18–25		77–98	P2 P3

==== Site B ====
Date	Time		Score		Set 1	Set 2	Set 3	Set 4	Set 5	Total	Report
14 Nov	12:35	Kenya	2–3	Thailand	15–25	25–23	25–22	13–25	10–15	88–110	P2 P3
14 Nov	15:05	Dominican Republic	0–3	Poland	14–25	14–25	18–25			46–75	P2 P3
14 Nov	18:05	South Korea	3–0	Peru	25–17	26–24	25–20			76–61	P2 P3
15 Nov	12:35	Dominican Republic	3–0	Kenya	25–19	25–16	25–18			75–53	P2 P3
15 Nov	15:05	Peru	0–3	Thailand	23–25	22–25	17–25			62–75	P2 P3
15 Nov	18:05	South Korea	1–3	Poland	20–25	25–20	23–25	19–25		87–95	P2 P3
16 Nov	12:05	Dominican Republic	3–2	Peru	23–25	21–25	25–17	25–10	15–13	109–90	P2 P3
16 Nov	14:35	Poland	3–0	Thailand	25–15	25–17	25–22			75–54	P2 P3
16 Nov	17:05	Kenya	0–3	South Korea	16–25	17–25	12–25			45–75	P2 P3

== Final standing ==
Rank	Team
1st place, gold medalist(s)	Italy
2nd place, silver medalist(s)	Brazil
3rd place, bronze medalist(s)	United States
4	Cuba
5	Serbia
6	Poland
7	Japan
8	South Korea
9	Dominican Republic
10	Thailand
11	Peru
12	Kenya

Qualified for the 2008 Summer Olympics

2007 Women's World Cup champions

Italy
1st title

Team roster
Jenny Barazza, Taismary Agüero, Antonella Del Core, Francesca Ferretti, Simona Gioli, Francesca Piccinini, Paola Cardullo, Martina Guiggi, Sara Anzanello, Eleonora Lo Bianco, Serena Ortolani, Manuela Secolo
Head coach
Massimo Barbolini

== Awards ==
- Most valuable player
  (Italy) Simona Gioli
- Best scorer
  (Poland) Katarzyna Skowronska
- Best spiker
  (Cuba) Nancy Carrillo
- Best blocker
  (Italy) Simona Gioli
- Best server
  (Cuba) Yanelis Santos
- Best libero
  (Italy) Paola Cardullo
- Best receiver
  (Japan) Yuko Sano
- Best digger
  (Japan) Yuko Sano
- Best setter
  (Brazil) Hélia Souza
