= Simona Gioli =

Italian volleyball player (born 1977)

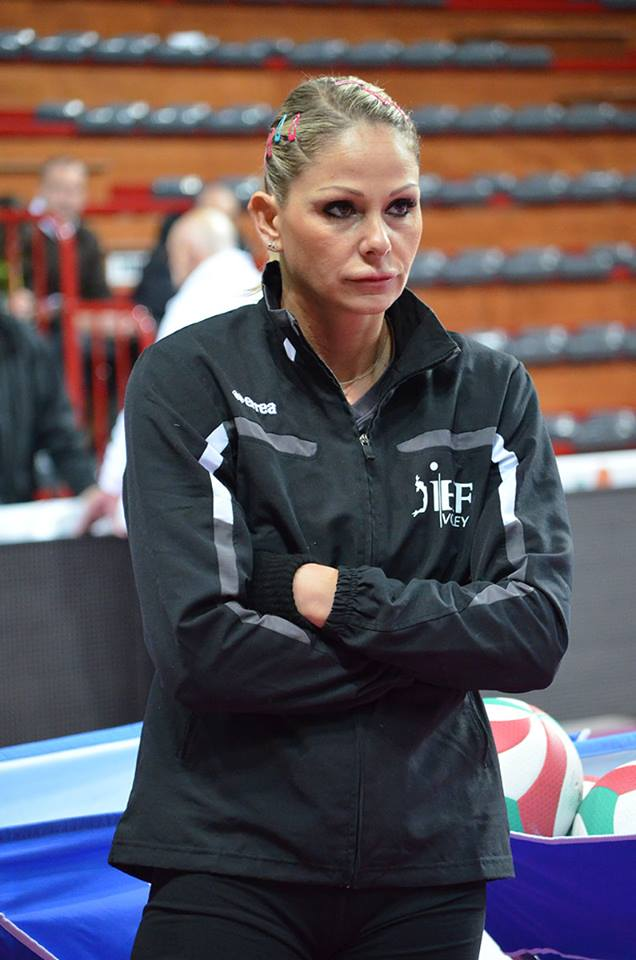
- Gioli with IHF in 2014

Personal information
- Nickname: Simo
- Nationality: Italy
- Born: September 17, 1977 (age 49); Rapallo, Italy
- Hometown: Perugia, Italy
- Height: 1.85 m (6 ft 1 in)
- Weight: 70 kg (154 lb)
- Spike: 309 cm (122 in)
- Block: 295 cm (116 in)

Volleyball information
- Position: Middle Blocker
- Current club: (Italy) Montichiari
- Number: 12

Career
Years	Teams
2006-2008; 2008-2011; 2011-2012; 2012-2013; 2013-2014; 2014-Present	Sirio Perugia; Dynamo Moscow; Fakel Novy Urengoi; Galatasaray Istanbul; IHF Volley; Metalleghe Sanitars Montichiari

National team
1999 - 2012	Italy
Medal record
Women's volleyball
Representing Italy
World Grand Champions Cup
Gold medal – first place	2009 Tokyo/Fukuoka	Team
European Championship
Gold medal – first place	2009 Poland	Team
Gold medal – first place	2007 Belgium-Luxembourg	Team
Silver medal – second place	2005 Croatia	Team
Bronze medal – third place	1999 Italy	Team
FIVB World Cup
Gold medal – first place	2007 Japan	Team
Gold medal – first place	2011 Japan	Team
FIVB World Grand Prix
Silver medal – second place	2004 Reggio Calabria	Team
Bronze medal – third place	2007 Ningbo	Team
Mediterranean Games
Gold medal – first place	2009 Pescara	Team
- Last updated: March 2010

Simona Gioli (born September 17, 1977, in Rapallo) is a retired volleyball player from Italy. Currently, she plays for Galatasaray in Turkey. Gioli was a member of the Women's National Team that won the gold medal at the 2007 European Championship in Belgium and Luxembourg. Gioli was named "Most Valuable Player and ""Best Blocker" at the 2007 FIVB Women's World Cup and 2009 FIVB Women's World Grand Champions Cup. She was also awarded "MVP" at the 2006-07 CEV Cup won by her team Sirio Perugia. She won the 2007–08 CEV Indesit Champions League with Sirio Perugia and also was individually awarded "Most Valuable Player".

Playing with Dynamo Moscow she won the silver medal at the 2008–09 CEV Indesit Champions League, and she was awarded "Best Spiker".

== Clubs ==
- (Italy) Sirio Perugia (2006–2008)
- (Russia) Dynamo Moscow (2008–2011)
- (Russia) Fakel Novy Urengoi (2011-2012)
- (Turkey) Galatasaray Daikin (2012-2013)
- (Italy) IHF Volley (2013-2014)
- (Italy) Metalleghe Sanitars Montichiari (2014–present)

== Awards ==
=== Individuals ===
- 2009 European Championships "Best Spiker"
- 2009 World Grand Champion Cup "Most Valuable Player"
- 2008–09 CEV Indesit Champions League Final Four "Best Spiker"
- 2007–08 CEV Indesit Champions League Final Four "Most Valuable Player"
- 2006-07 CEV Cup "Most Valuable Player"
- 2007 FIVB World Cup "Most Valuable Player"
- 2007 FIVB World Cup "Best Blocker"

=== Clubs ===
- 2006-07 CEV Cup - Champion, with Pallavolo Sirio Perugia
- 2007–08 CEV Indesit Champions League - Champion, with Colussi Perugia
- 2008–09 CEV Indesit Champions League - Runner-Up, with Dynamo Moscow
- 2012 Turkish Volleyball Super Cup - Runner-Up, with Galatasaray Daikin
- 2012-2013 Turkish Women's Volleyball Cup - Bronze Medal with Galatasaray Daikin
