= 2009 FIVB Volleyball Women's World Grand Champions Cup =

2009 World Grand Champions Cup
Tournament details
- Host country: Japan
- Dates: November 10–15
- Teams: 6
- Venues: 2 (in 2 host cities)

Final positions
- Champions: Italy (1st title)

Tournament awards
- MVP: Simona Gioli

The 2009 FIVB Women's World Grand Champions Cup was held in Tokyo and Fukuoka, Japan from November 10 to November 15, 2009. Italy won the tournament with perfect record and Simona Gioli was selected Most Valuable Player.

== Teams ==
Team	Qualified as
Japan	Host Nation
Thailand	2009 Asian Champions
Dominican Republic	2009 NORCECA Champions
Brazil	2009 South American Champions
Italy	2009 European Champions
South Korea	Wild Card

== Competition formula ==
The competition formula of the 2009 Women's World Grand Champions Cup was the single Round-Robin system. Each team plays once against each of the 5 remaining teams. Points are accumulated during the whole tournament, and the final standing is determined by the total points gained.

== Venues ==
- Tokyo Metropolitan Gymnasium (Tokyo)
- Marine Messe Fukuoka (Fukuoka)

== Results ==
Pos	Team	Pld	W	L	Pts	SW	SL	SR	SPW	SPL	SPR
1	Italy	5	5	0	10	15	3	5.000	449	393	1.142
2	Brazil	5	4	1	9	12	4	3.000	392	340	1.153
3	Dominican Republic	5	3	2	8	9	8	1.125	379	381	0.995
4	Japan	5	2	3	7	9	10	0.900	443	431	1.028
5	South Korea	5	1	4	6	6	14	0.429	392	466	0.841
6	Thailand	5	0	5	5	3	15	0.200	370	414	0.894

=== Tokyo round ===
Date	Time		Score		Set 1	Set 2	Set 3	Set 4	Set 5	Total	Report
10 Nov	13:00	Thailand	0–3	Italy	25–27	22–25	22–25			69–77	P2 P3
10 Nov	15:00	Dominican Republic	0–3	Brazil	23–25	16–25	17–25			56–75	P2 P3
10 Nov	19:00	Japan	3–1	South Korea	22–25	27–25	25–16	25–10		99–76	P2 P3
11 Nov	13:30	Thailand	1–3	Dominican Republic	25–14	20–25	21–25	26–28		92–92	P2 P3
11 Nov	15:30	Italy	3–2	South Korea	24–26	24–26	28–26	25–19	15–9	116–106	P2 P3
11 Nov	19:00	Brazil	3–1	Japan	24–26	25–21	25–23	25–21		99–91	P2 P3
12 Nov	13:30	South Korea	0–3	Brazil	26–28	17–25	15–25			58–78	P2 P3
12 Nov	15:30	Dominican Republic	0–3	Italy	19–25	18–25	20–25			57–75	P2 P3
12 Nov	19:00	Japan	3–0	Thailand	25–21	25–18	25–12			75–51	P2 P3

=== Fukuoka round ===
Date	Time		Score		Set 1	Set 2	Set 3	Set 4	Set 5	Total	Report
14 Nov	12:30	Thailand	2–3	South Korea	18–25	19–25	25–16	25–14	11–15	98–95	P2 P3
14 Nov	14:30	Italy	3–0	Brazil	25–21	25–23	25–21			75–65	P2 P3
14 Nov	18:00	Dominican Republic	3–1	Japan	24–26	25–22	25–16	25–18		99–82	P2 P3
15 Nov	12:30	Brazil	3–0	Thailand	25–22	25–20	25–18			75–60	P2 P3
15 Nov	14:30	South Korea	0–3	Dominican Republic	17–25	18–25	22–25			57–75	P2 P3
15 Nov	18:00	Japan	1–3	Italy	30–32	22–25	26–24	18–25		96–106	P2 P3

== Final standing ==
Rank	Team
1st place, gold medalist(s)	Italy
2nd place, silver medalist(s)	Brazil
3rd place, bronze medalist(s)	Dominican Republic
4	Japan
5	South Korea
6	Thailand

2009 FIVB Women's World Grand Champions Cup champions

Italy
First title

Team Roster Cristina Barcellini, Immacolata Sirressi, Giulia Rondon, Jenny Barazza, Paola Cardullo, Serena Ortolani, Francesca Piccinini, Valentina Arrighetti, Eleonora Lo Bianco, Antonella Del Core, Lucia Bosetti, Simona Gioli Head Coach: Massimo Barbolini

== Awards ==
- MVP: (Italy) Simona Gioli
- Best scorer: (South Korea) Kim Yeon-Koung
- Best spiker: (Italy) Simona Gioli
- Best blocker: (South Korea) Yang Hyo-Jin
- Best server: (Thailand) Malika Kanthong
- Best setter: (Japan) Yoshie Takeshita
- Best libero: (Brazil) Fabiana de Oliveira
