= Peter L. Francia =

American political scientist

Peter L. Francia is director of the Center for Survey Research and professor of political science at East Carolina University. He is known for his research in the field of American politics, specifically in the areas of campaign finance, interest groups, and public opinion. Francia is author or co-author of two Columbia University Press books, The Financiers of Congressional Elections: Investors, Ideologues, and Intimates and The Future of Organized Labor in American Politics, as well as multiple editions of Conventional Wisdom and American Elections: Exploding Myths, Exploring Misconceptions, published by Rowman & Littlefield. His work extends into polling as well. Along with Jonathan S. Morris, he helped found the ECU Poll, which conducts polls of elections for president, senate, and governor in multiple states across the nation. Francia also leads the Life, Liberty, and Happiness Project, which examines public attitudes and behavior nationwide on issues concerning lifestyle choices, personal freedom, and well-being.

== Career ==
Francia received his BA degree in political science from the University of Rochester and his MA degree and Ph.D. from the University of Maryland. After receiving his Ph.D. in 2000, he served as a research fellow at the Center for American Politics and Citizenship at the University of Maryland, before joining the faculty in the Department of Political Science at East Carolina University in 2004, where he continues to work presently. In 2014, he also served as co-director of Leadership Studies until becoming director of the ECU Center for Survey Research in the Thomas Harriot College of Arts and Sciences in 2017.

== Select publications ==
- The Financiers of Congressional Elections: Investors, Ideologues, and Intimates (co-authored with John C. Green, Paul S. Herrnson, Lynda W. Powell, and Clyde Wilcox). New York: Columbia University Press, 2003. ISBN 0231116195.
- The Future of Organized Labor in American Politics. New York: Columbia University Press, 2006. ISBN 0231130708.
- Guide to Interest Groups and Lobbying in the United States, associate editor (with Burdett A. Loomis, editor, and Dara Z. Strolovitch, associate editor). Washington, DC: CQ Press, 2012. ISBN 1604264578.
- “The Divided Republicans? Tea Party Supporters, Establishment Republicans, and Social Networks” (co-authored with Jonathan S. Morris), in John C. Green, Daniel J. Coffey, and David B. Cohen, eds., The State of the Parties: The Changing Role of Contemporary American Parties, 7th ed. (Lanham, MD: Rowman and Littlefield, 2014), 175–190. ISBN 1442225602.
- “Labor Unions and the Mobilization of Latino Voters: Can the Dinosaur Awaken the Sleeping Giant?” (co-authored with Susan Orr), Political Research Quarterly (2014): 943–956.
- “Campaign Finance: New Realities Beyond Citizens United” (co-authored with Wesley Y. Joe and Clyde Wilcox), in Richard J. Semiatin, ed., Campaigns on the Cutting Edge, 3rd ed. (Washington, DC: CQ Press, 2016), 145–163. ISBN 9781506316451.
- “Free Media and Twitter in the 2016 Presidential Election: The Unconventional Campaign of Donald Trump,” Social Science Computer Review (2017): 440–455.
- Conventional Wisdom and American Elections: Exploding Myths, Exploring Misconceptions (co-authored with Jody C Baumgartner). Lanham, MD: Rowman & Littlefield, 2020 (4th ed.). ISBN 1538129167.
