= Valentina Arrighetti =

Italian professional volleyball player (born 1985)

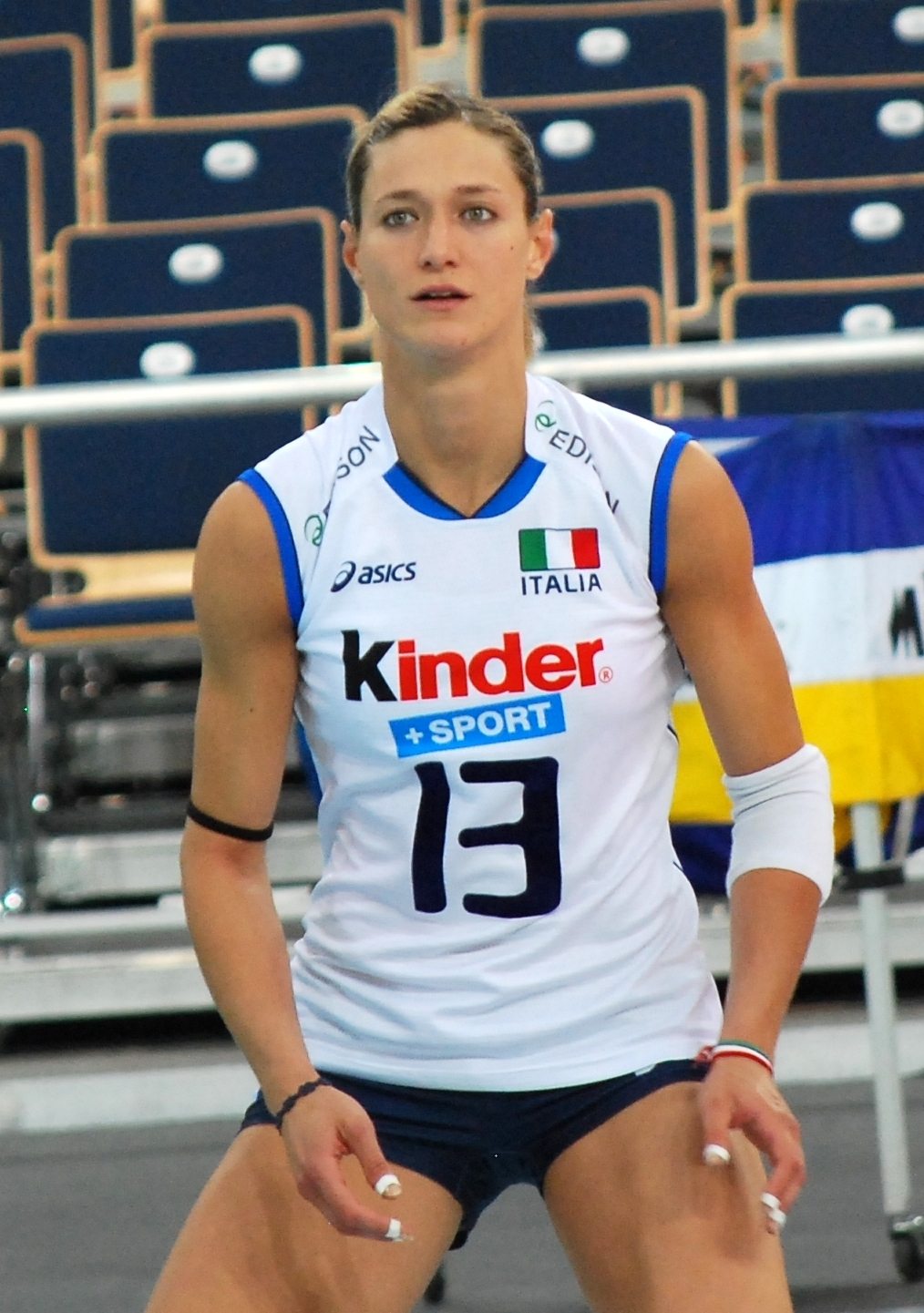

Personal information
- Full name: Valentina Arrighetti
- Nationality: Italian
- Born: 26 January 1985 (age 41) Genoa, Italy
- Height: 1.85 m (6 ft 1 in)
- Weight: 73 kg (161 lb)
- Spike: 310 cm (120 in)
- Block: 298 cm (117 in)

Volleyball information
- Position: Middle blocker
- Current club: (Italy) Savino Del Bene Scandicci
- Number: 13
Honours
Women's volleyball
Representing Italy
World Grand Champions Cup
Gold medal – first place	2009 Tokyo/Fukuoka	Team
FIVB World Cup
Gold medal – first place	2011 Japan	Team
FIVB World Grand Prix
Bronze medal – third place	2007 Tokyo	Team
Bronze medal – third place	2010 Ningbo	Team
European Championship
Gold medal – first place	2009 Poland	Team

Valentina Arrighetti (born 26 January 1985 in Genoa) is an Italian professional volleyball player. She plays for Italy women's national volleyball team as a middle blocker, as well as playing at club level for Volley Bergamo. She has competed in the 2012 Summer Olympics. She is 1.85 m (6 ft 1 in) tall and weights 72 kg.

== Career ==
Arrighetti played with her national team at the 2014 World Championship. There her team ended up in fourth place after losing 2–3 to Brazil the bronze medal match.

== Private life ==
She married volleyball player Gaia Moretto.

== Clubs ==
- (Italy) Club Italia (2000–2002)
- (Italy) VC Padova (2002–2003)
- (Italy) Figurella Firenze (2003–2004)
- (Italy) Caoduro Cavazzale (2004–2005)
- (Italy) Volley Vicenza (2005–2007)
- (Italy) Volley Bergamo (2007–2012)
- (Italy) Busto Arsizio (2012–2014)
- (Azerbaijan) Lokomotiv Baku (2014–2015)
- (Italy) Imoco Conegliano (2015–2016)
- (Italy) Savino Del Bene Scandicci (2016–2018)
- (Italy) Pomì Casalmaggiore (2018–)

== Awards ==
=== Clubs ===
- 2008 Italian Supercup— Runner-Up, with Volley Bergamo
- 2008 Italian Cup— Champions, with Volley Bergamo
- 2008–09 CEV Champions League— Champions, with Volley Bergamo
- 2009–10 CEV Champions League— Champions, with Volley Bergamo
- 2010 Italian Cup— Runner-Up, with Volley Bergamo
- 2010 FIVB Club World Championship— Bronze medal, with Volley Bergamo
- 2010–11 Italian Championship - Champion, with Volley Bergamo
- 2011 Italian Supercup - Champions, with Volley Bergamo
- 2011 Italian Cup— Runner-Up, with Volley Bergamo
- 2012 Italian Supercup - Champions, with Yamamay Busto Arsizio
- 2012–13 CEV Champions League - Bronze medal, with Yamamay Busto Arsizio
- 2013–14 Italian Championship - Runner-Up, with Yamamay Busto Arsizio
- 2014–15 Azerbaijan Championship - Runner-Up, with Lokomotiv Baku
