= Serena Ortolani =

Italian volleyball player (born 1987)

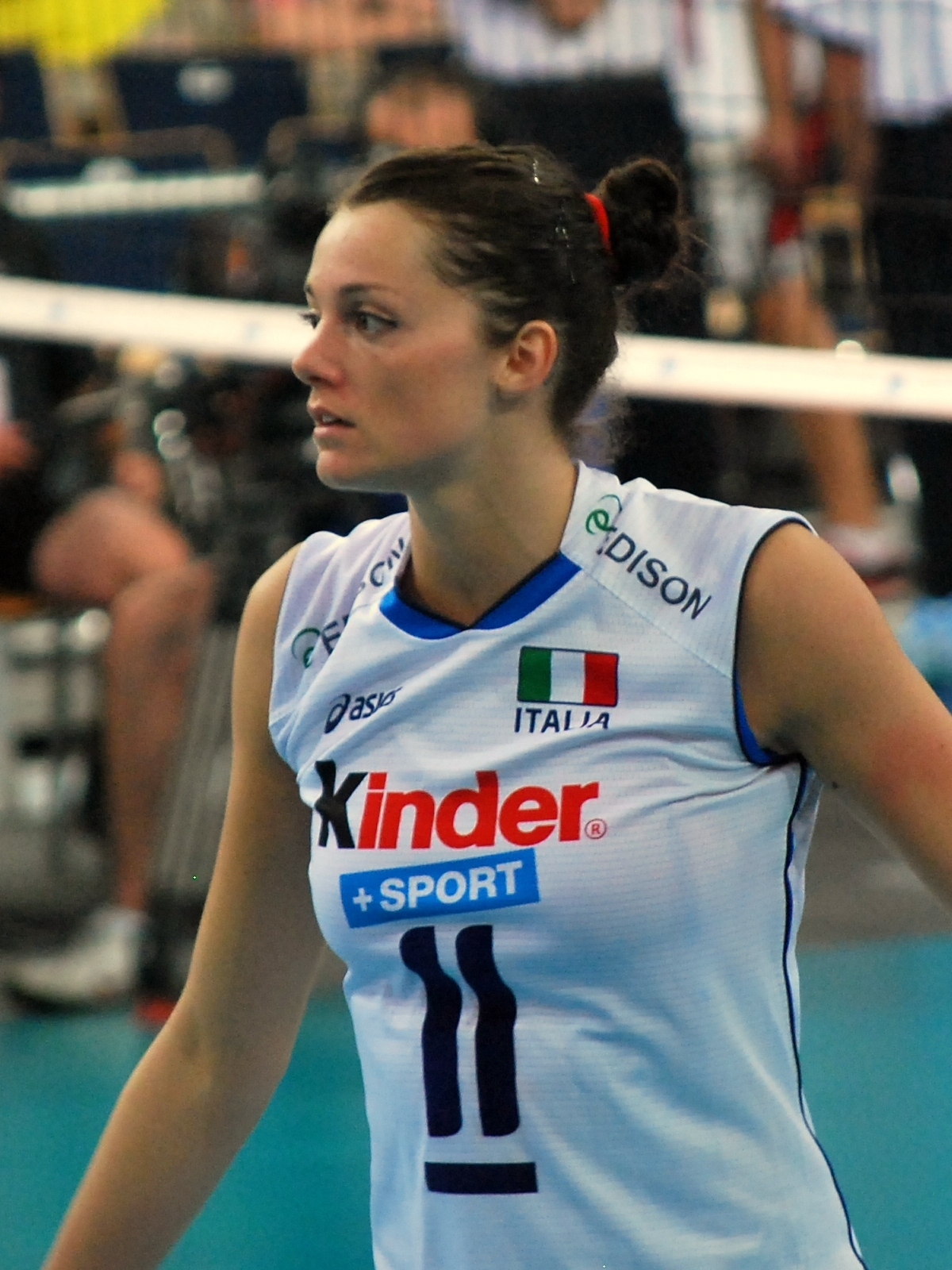
- Ortolani in 2012

Personal information
- Full name: Serena Ortolani
- Born: 7 January 1987 (age 39); Ravenna, Italy
- Height: 1.87 m (6 ft 2 in)
- Weight: 67 kg (148 lb)
- Spike: 320 cm (126 in)
- Block: 310 cm (122 in)

Volleyball information
- Position: Opposite spiker / Wing Spiker
- Current club: ProVictoria Pallavolo Monza
- Number: 1

Career
Years	Teams
1999-2000	Libertas Forli
2000-2002	Teodora Ravenna
2002–2004	Club Italia
2004-2007	Volley Bergamo
2007	River Volley Piacenza
2007-2008	FV Busto Arsizio
2008-2011	Volley Bergamo
2011-2012	Robursport Volley Pesaro
2013-2014	FV Busto Arsizio
2014-2015	VB Casalmaggiore
2015-2017	Imoco Volley Conegliano
2017-	Victoria Monza

National team
2004 – 2018	Italy
Honours
Women's volleyball
Representing Italy
World Championship
Silver medal – second place	2018 Japan	Team
World Grand Champions Cup
Gold medal – first place	2009 Japan	Team
World Cup
Gold medal – first place	2007 Japan	Team
World Grand Prix
Silver medal – second place	2005 Sendai	Team
Bronze medal – third place	2007 Ningbo	Team
Bronze medal – third place	2007 Yokohama	Team
Bronze medal – third place	2010 Ningbo	Team
European Championships
Gold medal – first place	2007 Belgium / Luxembourg	Team
Gold medal – first place	2009 Poland	Team
Silver medal – second place	2005 Croatia	Team

Serena Ortolani (born 7 January 1987 in Ravenna) is an Italian volleyball player.

== Career ==
She has played as an opposite hitter for Foppapedretti Bergamo from 2008 to 2011. Her debut for the national team came on the 2005 edition of the European Championships, held in Croatia, when the team was then coached by Marco Bonitta. In the 2005/06 season, she won her first Coppa Italia and Scudetto with Foppapedretti Bergamo. In 2006, she was selected again for the national team for the 2006 FIVB Women's World Championship, held in Japan, where she helped Italy win fourth place. She began the 2006/2007 season for Bergamo, but after the first half of the season, she was loaned to Rebecchi Piacenza, to improve her game further. In 2007, she helped the Italian volleyball team win the Women's European Volleyball Championship, held in Belgium and Luxembourg and repeated this success a few months later at the World Cup in Japan, thereby helping Italy gain qualification for the 2008 Olympic Games in Beijing, where she subsequently competed.

She won the 2008–09 CEV Indesit Champions League playing with Volley Bergamo and was awarded "Most Valuable Player".

She was selected to play the Italian League All-Star game in 2017.

== Clubs ==
- (Italy) Teodora Ravenna (2000–2001)
- (Italy) Foppapedretti Bergamo (2004–2006)
- (Italy) Rebecchi Piacenza (2006–2007)
- (Italy) Yamamay Busto Arsizio (2007–2008)
- (Italy) Foppapedretti Bergamo (2008–2011)
- (Italy) Volley Pesaro (2011–2012)
- (Italy) Yamamay Busto Arsizio (2013–2014)
- (Italy) Pomi Casalmaggiore (2014–2015)
- (Italy) Imoco Conegliano (2015–2017)
- (Italy) ProVictoria Pallavolo Monza (2017–present)

== Awards ==
=== Individuals ===
- 2008–09 CEV Indesit Champions League Final Four "Most Valuable Player"

=== Club ===
- 2004 Italian Supercup - Champion, with Radio 105 Foppapedretti Bergamo
- 2004–05 CEV Champions League - Champion, with Radio 105 Foppapedretti Bergamo
- 2005-06 Italian Championship - Champion, with Radio 105 Foppapedretti Bergamo
- 2005-06 Italian Cup (Coppa Italia) - Champion, with Radio 105 Foppapedretti Bergamo
- 2008–09 CEV Champions League - Champion, with Foppapedretti Bergamo
- 2009–10 CEV Champions League - Champion, with Foppapedretti Bergamo
- 2010–11 Italian League - Champion, with Norda Foppapedretti Bergamo
- 2014–15 Italian League - Champion, with Pomì Casalmaggiore
- 2015–16 Italian League - Champion, with Imoco Volley Conegliano
- 2016 Italian Supercup - Champions, with Imoco Volley Conegliano
- 2016-17 Italian Cup (Coppa Italia) - Champions, with Imoco Volley Conegliano
- 2016–17 CEV Champions League - Runner-Up, with Imoco Volley Conegliano
- 2018–19 CEV Challenge Cup - Champion, with ProVictoria Pallavolo Monza

=== National team ===
- 2007 World Cup
- 2007 European Championships
- 2005 European Championships

=== National youth team ===
- 2004 Junior European Championships
