= Franconia, Ohio =

Coordinates: 41°2′22″N 84°18′0″W

Franconia is a ghost town in Putnam County, in the U.S. state of Ohio.

== History ==
Franconia was laid out in 1837. A post office was established at Franconia in 1837, and remained in operation until 1867.
