= Antonella Del Core =

Italian professional volleyball player

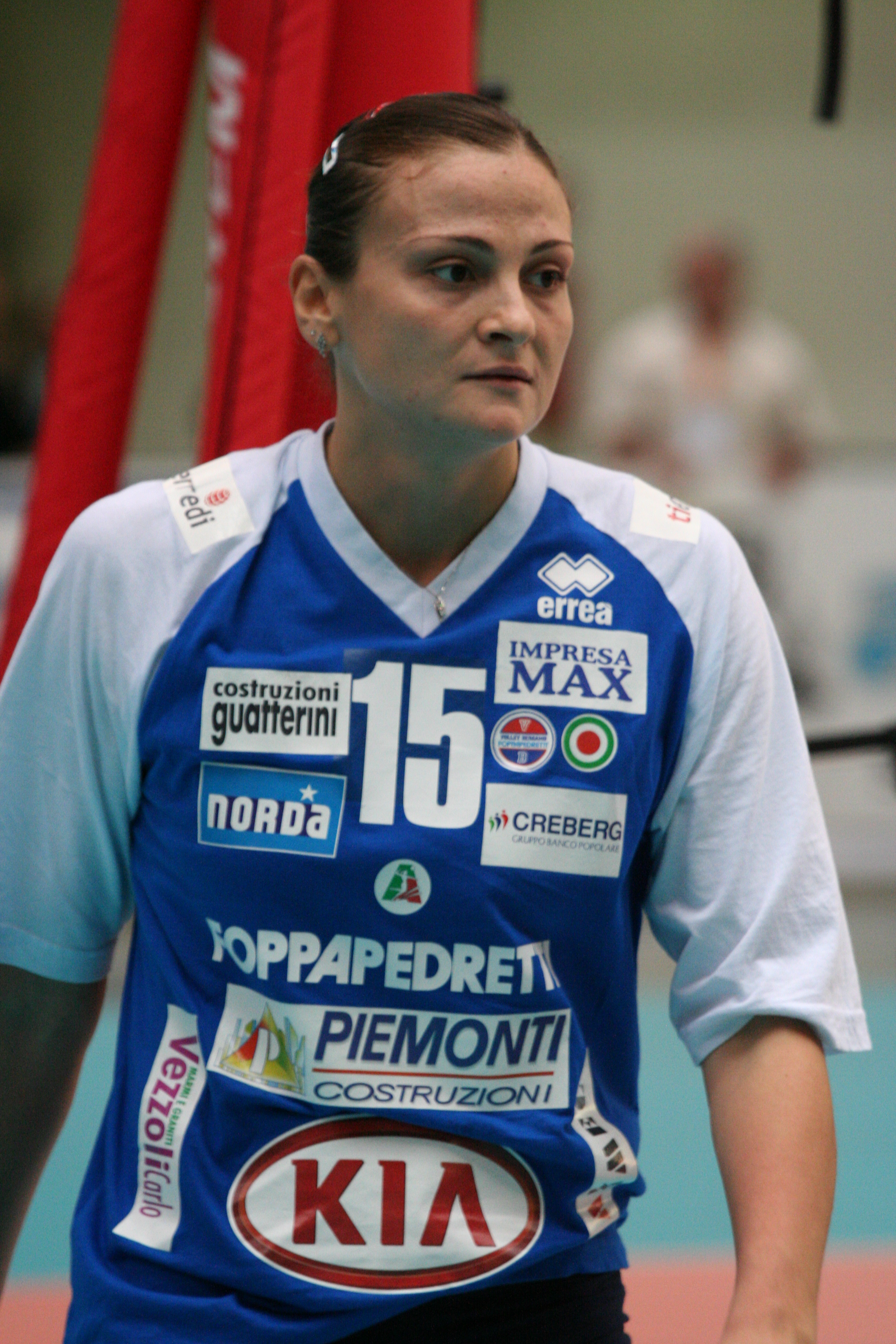
- Del Core with Bergamo in 2008

Personal information
- Nationality: Italian
- Born: 5 November 1980 (age 45); Naples, Italy
- Height: 1.80 m (5 ft 11 in)
- Weight: 73 kg (161 lb)
- Spike: 320 cm (126 in)
- Block: 305 cm (120 in)

Volleyball information
- Position: Wing Spiker
- Current club: (Russia) Dinamo Kazan
- Number: 15
Honours
Women's volleyball
Representing Italy
World Grand Champions Cup
Gold medal – first place	2009 Tokyo/Fukuoka	Team
FIVB World Cup
Gold medal – first place	2007 Japan	Team
Gold medal – first place	2011 Japan	Team
FIVB World Grand Prix
Silver medal – second place	2004 Reggio Calabria	Team
Silver medal – second place	2005 Sendai	Team
Bronze medal – third place	2006 Reggio Calabria	Team
Bronze medal – third place	2010 Ningbo	Team
European Championship
Gold medal – first place	2007 Belgium	Team
Gold medal – first place	2009 Poland	Team
Silver medal – second place	2005 Croatia	Team

Antonella Del Core (born 5 November 1980 in Naples, Italy) is an Italian former professional volleyball player. She played for Italy women's national volleyball team. She has competed in the 2004 and 2012 Summer Olympics. She is 1.80 m (5 ft 11 in) tall. She won the Best Server award of the 2013–14 CEV Champions League and won the title with the Russian club Dinamo Kazan.

== Career ==
Del Core won with the Russian club Dinamo Kazan the 2013–14 CEV Champions League held in Baku, Azerbaijan, defeating 3-0 the home owners Rabita Baku in the semifinals and 3–0 to the Turkish VakıfBank İstanbul in the final. She was awarded tournament Best Server.

Del Core won the 2014 FIVB Club World Championship gold medal playing with the Russian club Dinamo Kazan that defeated 3-0 the Brazilian Molico Osasco in the championship match.

She played with her national team at the 2014 World Championship. There her team ended up in fourth place after losing 2–3 to Brazil the bronze medal match.

== Clubs ==
- (Italy) Assid Ester Napoli (1997–1998)
- (Italy) Club Italia (1998–1999)
- (Italy) Er Volley Napoli (1999–2001)
- (Italy) Robursport Volley Pesaro (2001–2006)
- (Italy) Pallavolo Sirio Perugia (2006–2008)
- (Italy) Volley Bergamo (2008–2010)
- (Turkey) Eczacıbaşı Istanbul (2010–2011)
- (Russia) Fakel Novy Ourengoï (2011–2012)
- (Russia) Zarechie Odintsovo (2012–2013)
- (Russia) Dinamo Kazan (2013–2016)

== Awards ==
=== Individuals ===
- 2009-10 CEV Champions League "Best receiver"
- 2013-14 CEV Champions League "Best server"
- 2016 World Olympic qualification tournament "Best outside spiker"

=== Clubs ===
- 2005–06 CEV Women's Challenge Cup— Champions, with Scavolini Pesaro
- 2006–07 CEV Women's Challenge Cup— Champions, with Sirio Perugia
- 2006–07 Italian Championship - Champion, with Sirio Perugia
- 2007 Italian Cup - Champion, with Sirio Perugia
- 2007 Italian Supercup - Champions, with Sirio Perugia
- 2007–08 CEV Champions League— Champions, with Sirio Perugia
- 2008 Italian Supercup— Runner-Up, with Volley Bergamo
- 2008–09 CEV Champions League— Champions, with Volley Bergamo
- 2009–10 CEV Champions League— Champions, with Volley Bergamo
- 2010 Italian Cup— Runner-Up, with Volley Bergamo
- 2010-11 Turkish Cup - Champions, with Eczacıbaşı Istanbul
- 2013 Russian Cup - Runner-up, with Dinamo Kazan
- 2013–14 CEV Champions League - Champion, with Dinamo Kazan
- 2013–14 Russian Championship - Champions, with Dinamo Kazan
- 2014 FIVB Club World Championship - Champion, with Dinamo Kazan
- 2014–15 Russian Championship - Champions, with Dinamo Kazan
