= Neli Marinova =

Bulgarian volleyball player (born 1971)

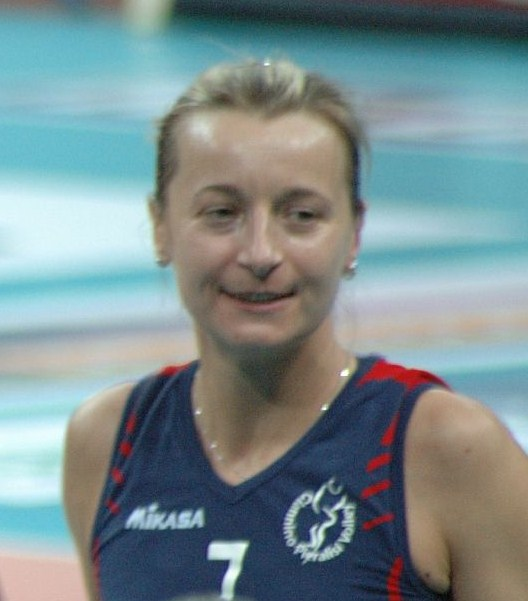

Personal information
- Full name: Neli Marinova Nešić
- Nationality: Bulgarian
- Born: 27 May 1971 (age 55)
- Height: 173 cm (5 ft 8 in)
- Weight: 62 kg (137 lb)
- Spike: 284 cm (112 in)
- Block: 280 cm (110 in)

Volleyball information
- Position: setter
- Number: 7 (national team)

National team
1998	Bulgaria

Neli Marinova Nešić (Bulgarian: Нели Маринова-Нешич; born 27 May 1971) is a retired Bulgarian female volleyball player.

She was part of the Bulgaria women's national volleyball team at the 1998 FIVB Volleyball Women's World Championship in Japan, and at the 2002 FIVB Volleyball Women's World Championship in Germany. As of 2002, she played for Romaneli.
