= VV Martinus =

Dutch volleyball club

Martinus Amstelveen
- Full name: Volleybalvereniging St. Martinus Amstelveen
- Short name: VV Martinus
- Founded: 1954
- Dissolved: 2011
- Ground: Bankrashal, Amstelveen, Netherlands

Volleybalvereniging St. Martinus was a Dutch volleyball club based in Amstelveen. It won the national league and cup multiple times and also played in European competitions.

In 2009 the women's first team merged with AMVJ Amstelveen and formed a new club called TVC Amstelveen and in 2011, the club's remaining teams merged with AMVJ Amstelveen to form a new club called AMVJ-Martinus Amstelveen, competing under the name vv AMstelveen.

== Previous names ==
Due to sponsorship, the club have competed under the following names:

- Martinus (1954–1978)
- Valkenberg Martinus (1978–1983)
- Brother Martinus (1983–2006)
- ....
- Schipper K Martinus (women's team) (....–2004)
- HCCnet Martinus (women's team) (2004–2006)
- Dela Martinus (women's team) (2006–2009)

== Honours ==
=== Men ===
- Dutch League: 5

1983–84, 1984–85, 1985–86, 1986–87, 1987–88

- Dutch Cup: 5

1983–84, 1984–85, 1985–86, 1986–87, 1987–88

=== Women ===
- Dutch League: 4

2005–06, 2006–07, 2007–08, 2008–09

- Dutch Cup: 6

1989–90, 1990–91, 2005–06, 2006–07, 2007–08, 2008–09

- Dutch Supercup: 2

2008, 2009

== History ==
Founded on 24 September 1954, as the volleyball division of club St. Martinus, which already had football, badminton and tennis departments.

The club reached the highest division in 1978, and shortly after during the 1980s, the club became successful with the men's team winning five consecutive times the Dutch League and Cup. During that time the men's team also competed in the CEV Champions League, finishing third three times in a row (1986, 1987 and 1988).

The women's team also achieved success during the 2000s after winning four Dutch Leagues and Cups in succession and two Supercups, were added to the two Dutch Cups won in the 1990s. The club also played in the CEV Women's Champions League, Women's CEV Cup and the CEV Women's Challenge Cup.

During the 2000s, the women's team became successful by winning four consecutive Both its men's and women's teams achieved success, with the men's side winning the Dutch League on five occasions during the 1980s and the women's winning four league titles in the 2000s. Both teams had also played in their respective CEV Champions League.

On 15 July 2009, the first women's team of Martinus and AMVJ Amstelveen merged, creating the Top Volleybal Combinatie Amstelveen, known as TVC Amstelveen.

On 15 June 2011, the remaining Martinus teams merged with AMVJ and AMVJ Martinus Amstelveen was born, competing under the name vv AMstelveen
