= Asystel Volley =

Italian volleyball club

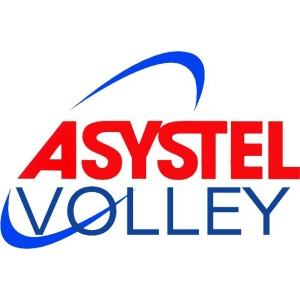
- Full name: Asystel Volley Novara
- Founded: 2003
- Dissolved: 2012
- Ground: PalaTerdoppio, Novara, Italy (Capacity: 5,000)

Uniforms
Home	Away

Asystel Volley was an Italian women's volleyball club based in Novara. It played in the Serie A1 from its creation in 2003 until its dissolution in 2012.

== Previous names ==
Due to sponsorship, the club have competed under the following names:

- Asystel Novara (2003–2004)
- Sant'Orsola Asystel Novara (2004–2007)
- Asystel Volley Novara (2007–2012)

== History ==
The club was founded in 2003, when Serie A1 club AGIL Volley decided to focus on youth teams. Asystel who was AGIL's main sponsor at the time, established a professional club keeping AGIL Serie A1 licence, which meant the new club started its existence playing in the highest Italian league (Serie A1).

Apart from the Serie A1 participation, the club also played in the Italian Cup, Italian Supercup, Women's CEV Cup and CEV Women's Champions League. It had some success and won the Italian Cup in 2003–04, the Italian Supercup in 2003 and 2005, the CEV Top Teams Cup in 2005–06 and the CEV Cup in 2008–09.

In 2012 it merged with Gruppo Sportivo Oratorio Villa Cortese, moving all its volleyball activities to the newly formed Asystel MC Carnaghi.

== Notable players ==
- (Serbia and Montenegro) Anja Spasojević
- (Serbia) Ivana Nešović
- (Poland) Małgorzata Glinka
- (Romania) Cristina Pîrv
- (Serbia) Sanja Malagurski
- (Serbia) Stefana Veljković
- (United States) Ogonna Nnamani
- (China) Feng Kun

== Former coaches ==
- (Italy) Giovanni Caprara

== Honours ==
=== National competitions ===
- Coppa Italia: 1

2003–04

- Italian Super Cup: 2

2003, 2005

=== International competitions ===
- Top Teams Cup / CEV Cup: 2

2005–06, 2008–09
