= 2004 Continental Championships =

2004 Continental Championships may refer to:

== African Championships ==
- Multisport: 2004 African Cup of Nations

== Asian Championships ==
- Football (soccer): 2004 AFC Asian Cup
- Football (soccer): 2004 AFC Champions League

== European Championships ==
- Artistic gymnastics: 2004 European Women's Artistic Gymnastics Championships
- Figure skating: 2004 European Figure Skating Championships
- Football (soccer): 2003–04 UEFA Champions League
- Football (soccer): 2003–04 UEFA Cup
- Football (soccer): UEFA Euro 2004
- Football (soccer): 2003–04 UEFA Women's Cup
- Volleyball: 2004–05 CEV Champions League
- Volleyball: 2004–05 CEV Women's Champions League

== Oceanian Championships ==
- Football (soccer): 2005 OFC Club Championship
- Swimming: 2004 Oceania Swimming Championships

== Pan American Championships / North American Championships ==
- Football (soccer): 2004 CONCACAF Champions' Cup
- Gymnastics (artistic): 2004 Pan American Individual Event Artistic Gymnastics Championships
- Gymnastics (trampoline and tumbling): 2004 Pan American Trampoline and Tumbling Championships
- Judo: 2004 Pan American Judo Championships

== South American Championships ==
- Football (soccer): 2004 Copa América

== See also ==
- 2004 World Championships (disambiguation)
- 2004 World Junior Championships (disambiguation)
- 2004 World Cup (disambiguation)
- Continental championship (disambiguation)
