= 2005 Continental Championships =

2005 Continental Championships may refer to:

== African Championships ==
- Basketball: FIBA Africa Championship 2005

== Asian Championships ==
- Athletics: 2005 Asian Athletics Championships
- Baseball: 2005 Asian Baseball Championship
- Basketball: 2005 FIBA Asia Championship
- Football (soccer): 2005 AFC Champions League
- Multisport: 2005 Asian Indoor Games

== European Championships ==
- Artistic Gymnastics: 2005 European Artistic Gymnastics Championships
- Athletics: 2005 European Athletics Indoor Championships
- Basketball: EuroBasket 2005
- Figure Skating: 2005 European Figure Skating Championships
- Football (soccer): 2004–05 UEFA Champions League
- Football (soccer): 2004–05 UEFA Cup
- Football (soccer): 2005 UEFA European Under-17 Championship
- Football (soccer): 2004–05 UEFA Women's Cup
- Shooting: 2005 European Shooting Championships, 2005 European 10 m Events Championships
- Volleyball: 2005–06 CEV Champions League
- Volleyball: 2005–06 CEV Women's Champions League

== Oceanian Championships ==
- Basketball: 2005 FIBA Oceania Championship
- Football (soccer): 2005 OFC Club Championship

== Pan American Championships / North American Championships ==
- Athletics: 2005 Pan American Junior Athletics Championships
- Basketball: 2005 FIBA Americas Championship
- Judo: 2005 Pan American Judo Championships
- Football (soccer): 2005 Caribbean Cup
- Football (soccer): 2005 CONCACAF Champions' Cup
- Football (soccer): 2005 CONCACAF Gold Cup
- Gymnastics (artistic and rhythmic): 2005 Pan American Gymnastics Championships

== South American Championships ==
- Football (soccer): 2005 Copa Libertadores

== See also ==
- 2005 World Championships (disambiguation)
- 2005 World Junior Championships (disambiguation)
- 2005 World Cup (disambiguation)
- Continental championship (disambiguation)
