= 2004–05 CEV Women's Champions League =

- League: CEV Women's Champions League
- Sport: Volleyball

CEV Women's Champions League seasons
- ← 2003–04 2005–06 →

The 2004–05 CEV Women's Champions League was the highest level of European club volleyball in the 2004–05 season. It was the 45th edition of Europe's top volleyball tournament for club teams which began with the group stage starting November 10, 2004, and ended with the final-four in Tenerife, Spain, on March 20, 2005. Twelve teams participated in the competition and the final victory went to Volley Bergamo for the fourth time.

== Group stage ==
=== Pool A ===
| Pos | Team | Pld | W | L | Pts | SW | SL | SR | SPW | SPL | SPR |
|---|---|---|---|---|---|---|---|---|---|---|---|
| 1 | (Italy) Bergamo | 10 | 9 | 1 | 19 | 29 | 7 | 4.143 | 871 | 684 | 1.273 |
| 2 | (France) RC Cannes | 10 | 7 | 3 | 17 | 24 | 14 | 1.714 | 872 | 822 | 1.061 |
| 3 | (Spain) Las Palmas | 10 | 4 | 6 | 14 | 16 | 21 | 0.762 | 818 | 831 | 0.984 |
| 4 | (Poland) BKS | 10 | 4 | 6 | 14 | 16 | 23 | 0.696 | 808 | 874 | 0.924 |
| 5 | (Turkey) VakıfBank S.K. | 10 | 3 | 7 | 13 | 15 | 21 | 0.714 | 787 | 837 | 0.940 |
| 6 | (Russia) Uralochka | 10 | 3 | 7 | 13 | 12 | 26 | 0.462 | 756 | 864 | 0.875 |

=== Pool B ===
| Pos | Team | Pld | W | L | Pts | SW | SL | SR | SPW | SPL | SPR |
|---|---|---|---|---|---|---|---|---|---|---|---|
| 1 | (Italy) Asystel | 10 | 9 | 1 | 19 | 28 | 7 | 4.000 | 829 | 659 | 1.258 |
| 2 | (Spain) Tenerife | 10 | 7 | 3 | 17 | 25 | 14 | 1.786 | 894 | 801 | 1.116 |
| 3 | (Azerbaijan) Azerrail Baku | 10 | 7 | 3 | 17 | 21 | 13 | 1.615 | 770 | 734 | 1.049 |
| 4 | (Turkey) Beşiktaş JK | 10 | 3 | 7 | 13 | 17 | 26 | 0.654 | 848 | 938 | 0.904 |
| 5 | (Poland) Grześki Goplana Kalisz | 10 | 3 | 7 | 13 | 13 | 25 | 0.520 | 791 | 856 | 0.924 |
| 6 | (Serbia) Crvena Zvezda | 10 | 1 | 9 | 11 | 8 | 27 | 0.296 | 686 | 830 | 0.827 |

== Play-off 6 ==
- 1st leg 9–10 February 2005
- 2nd leg 15–16 February 2005

| Team #1 | Results | Team #2 |
|---|---|---|
| Las Palmas (Spain) | 2 – 3 (10–25, 27–25, 22–25, 25–23, 12–15); 0 – 3 (14–25, 15–25, 16–25) | (Italy) Asystel |
| Bergamo (Italy) | 3 – 0 (25–13, 25–11, 25–16); 1 – 3 (25-15, 16–25, 20–25, 20–25) | (Turkey) Beşiktaş JK |
| RC Cannes (France) | 3 – 0 (29–27, 25–22, 25–19); 1 – 3 (25-16, 20–25, 23–25, 20–25) | (Azerbaijan) Azerrail Baku |

== Final four ==
- venue: Tenerife, Spain
- dates: 19–20 March 2005

Semi-finals
19 March
(Italy) Asystel | 3
(France) RC Cannes | 1
19 March
(Italy) Bergamo | 3
(Spain) Tenerife | 0

Final
20 March
(Italy) Asystel | 0
(Italy) Bergamo | 3
3rd place
20 March
(France) RC Cannes | 1
(Spain) Tenerife | 3

=== Semi-finals ===
| | Score | | Set 1 | Set 2 | Set 3 | Set 4 | Set 5 |
|---|---|---|---|---|---|---|---|
| Asystel (Italy) | 3 – 1 | (France) RC Cannes | 22–25 | 25–21 | 25–20 | 25–22 | |
| Bergamo (Italy) | 3 – 0 | (Spain) Tenerife | 26–24 | 25–18 | 25–16 | | |

=== Third place match ===
| | Score | | Set 1 | Set 2 | Set 3 | Set 4 | Set 5 |
|---|---|---|---|---|---|---|---|
| RC Cannes (France) | 1 – 3 | (Spain) Tenerife | 18–25 | 25–19 | 23–25 | 22–25 | |

=== Final ===
| | Score | | Set 1 | Set 2 | Set 3 | Set 4 | Set 5 |
|---|---|---|---|---|---|---|---|
| Asystel (Italy) | 1 – 3 | (Italy) Bergamo | 18–25 | 16–25 | 17–25 | | |

== Final standing ==
| Rank | Team |
|---|---|
| 1st place, gold medalist(s) | (Italy) Bergamo |
| 2nd place, silver medalist(s) | (Italy) Asystel |
| 3rd place, bronze medalist(s) | (Spain) Tenerife |
| 4 | (France) RC Cannes |

2004–05 Women's Club European Champions

Bergamo
1st title

== Awards ==
- MVP: (Russia) Lyubov Sokolova, Bergamo
- Best Scorer: (France) Victoria Ravva, RC Cannes
- Best Spiker: (Russia) Lyubov Sokolova, Bergamo
- Best Server: (Belgium) Virginie De Carne, Asystel
- Best Blocker: (Croatia) Maja Poljak, Bergamo
- Best Setter: (Ukraine) Iryna Zhukova, Bergamo
- Best Libero: (Italy) Paola Cardullo, Asystel
- Best receiver: (Spain) Esther López, Tenerife

"Champions League 2004/05 player awards :". Women Volleybox. Retrieved 2023-09-12.
