= 1962–63 Volleyball Women's European Cup =

The 1962–63 Volleyball Women's European Cup was the third edition of the official competition for European women's volleyball national champions. It was contested by eleven teams, with West Germany making its debut, and the quarterfinals and semifinals were reinstated instead of the previous edition's group stage. WVC Dynamo Moscow defeated AZS Warsaw to win its second title.

== Preliminary round ==
Team #1	Agg.	Team #2	1st	2nd
Montpellier UC (France)	6–0	(Portugal) CDUL Lisboa	3–0	3–0
Dynamo Berlin (East Germany)	?–?	(Turkey) Galatasaray S.K.	3–0	?–?
TJ Dynamo Prague (Czech Republic)	?–?	(Germany) 1. VC Hannover	3–1	?–?

== Quarterfinals ==
Team #1	Agg.	Team #2	1st	2nd
TJ Dynamo Prague (Czech Republic)	?–?	(France) Montpellier UC	?–?	?–?
Dynamo Moscow (Soviet Union)	6–1	(East Germany) Dynamo Berlin	3–0	3–1
Levski Sofia (Bulgaria)	6–1	(Hungary) Vasas-Turbo Budapest	3–0	3–1
Red Star Belgrade (Socialist Federal Republic of Yugoslavia)	?–?	(Poland) AZS-AWF Warsaw	?–?	?–?

== Semifinals ==
Team #1	Agg.	Team #2	1st	2nd
TJ Dynamo Prague (Czech Republic)	3–5	(Soviet Union) Dynamo Moscow	0–3	3–2
Levski Sofia (Bulgaria)	4–6	(Poland) AZS-AWF Warsaw	2–3	2–3

== Final ==
Team #1	Agg.	Team #2	1st	2nd
Dynamo Moscow (Soviet Union)	6–3	(Poland) AZS-AWF Warsaw	3–1	3–2

Women's Volleyball European Cup
1962-63 Champions
(Soviet Union) Dynamo Moscow
Second title
