= Irina Polechtchouk =

Belarusian-French volleyball player (born 1973)

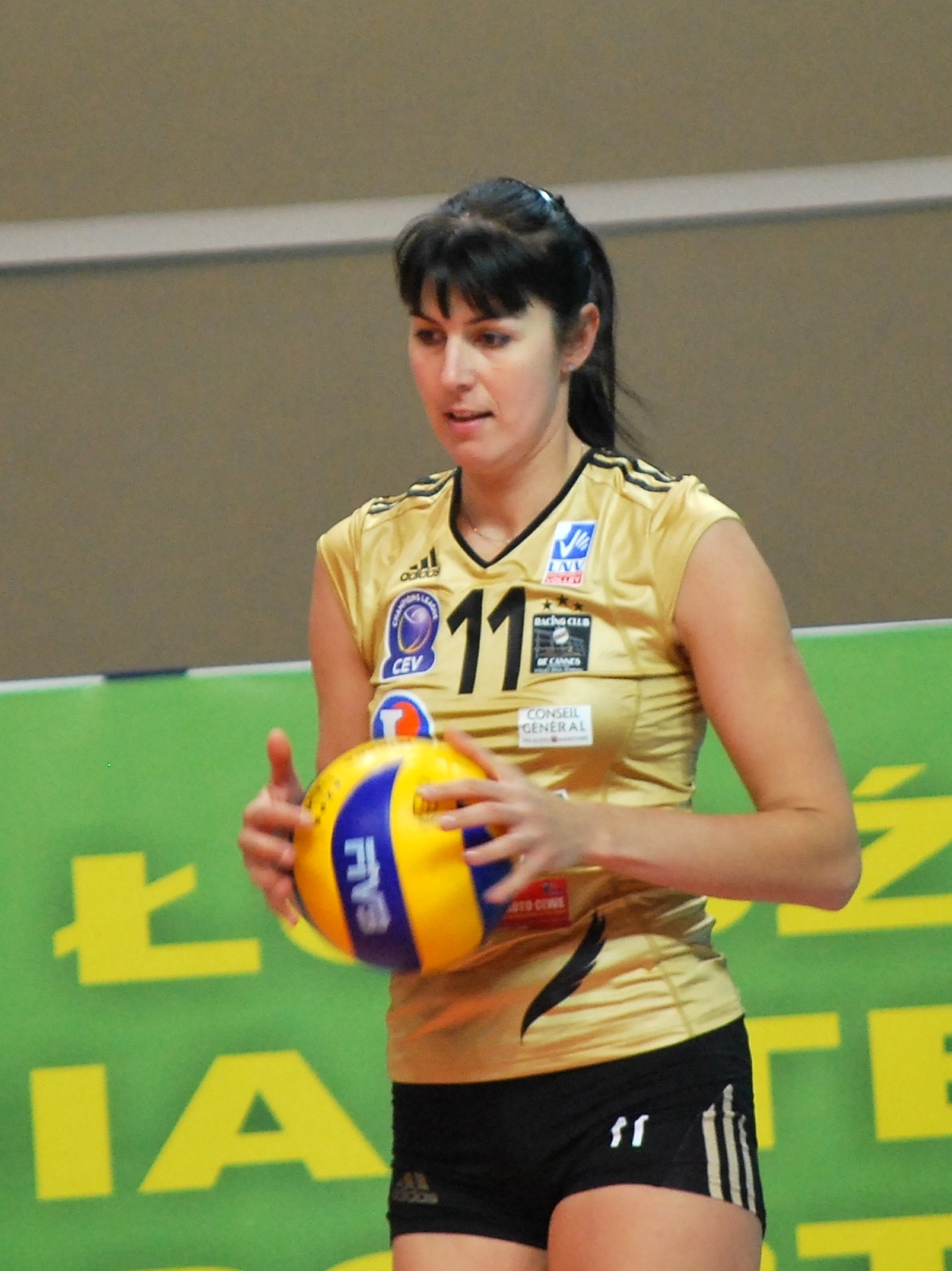

Personal information
- Nationality: Belarus; France (since 2002)
- Born: 1 August 1973 (age 53); Minsk
- Height: 6 ft 1 in (1.86 m)
- Weight: 159 lb (72 kg)
- Spike: 122 in (311 cm)
- Block: 115 in (291 cm)

Volleyball information
- Position: Middle blocker

Career
Years	Teams
1985-1994; 1994-2004; 2004-2006; 2006-2007; 2007-2008; 2008-2011; 2012-2014	(Soviet Union) / (Belarus) Amkodor Minsk (France) RC Villebon 91 (France) La Rochette Volley (France) RC Cannes (France) ES Le Cannet-Rocheville (France) RC Cannes (France) Municipal Olympique Mougins VB

National team
Belarus

Irina Polechtchouk (born 1 August 1973) is a Belarusian-French volleyball player, a member of the Belarus women's national volleyball team. By playing in France for a long time she obtained French nationality.

== Sporting achievements ==
=== Clubs ===
Belarusian Championship:

- 2004

CEV Cup:

- 2008
- 1995

French Championship:

- 2007, 2009, 2010, 2011
- 2000, 2001, 2002, 2003, 2006
- 1995, 1996, 1998, 2005

French Cup:

- 2002, 2007, 2009, 2010, 2011

Top Teams Cup:

- 2003

CEV Women's Champions League:

- 2010

=== National team ===
FIVB Women's U20 World Championship:

- 1991

Women's Junior European Championship:

- 1992
