= 2012 Continental Championships =

2012 Continental Championships may refer to:

== African Championship ==
- Athletics: 2012 African Championships in Athletics

== Asian Championships ==
- Badminton: 2012 Badminton Asia Championships
- Baseball: 2012 Asian Baseball Championship
- Cricket: 2012 Asia Cup
- Cycling: 2012 Asian Cycling Championships
- Football (soccer): 2012 AFC Champions League
- Football (soccer): 2012 AFC Cup
- Football (soccer): 2012 AFC Challenge Cup
- Netball: 2012 Asian Netball Championships
- Roller hockey: 2012 Asian Roller Hockey Cup
- Swimming: 2012 Asian Swimming Championships
- Volleyball: 2012 Asian Men's Volleyball Cup
- Volleyball: 2012 Asian Women's Volleyball Cup
- Water Polo: 2012 Asian Water Polo Championship
- Weightlifting: 2012 Asian Weightlifting Championships
- Multisport: 2012 Asian Beach Games

== European Championships ==
- Aquatics: 2012 European Aquatics Championships,
- Artistic Gymnastics: 2012 European Men's Artistic Gymnastics Championships
- Artistic Gymnastics: 2012 European Women's Artistic Gymnastics Championships
- Athletics: 2012 European Athletics Championships
- Figure Skating: 2012 European Figure Skating Championships
- Football (soccer): 2011–12 UEFA Champions League
- Football (soccer): 2011–12 UEFA Europa League
- Football (soccer): 2011–12 UEFA Women's Champions League
- Football (soccer): 2012 UEFA European Under-17 Football Championship
- Handball: 2012 European Men's Handball Championship
- Handball: 2012 European Women's Handball Championship
- Rhythmic Gymnastics: 2012 Rhythmic Gymnastics European Championships
- Taekwondo: 2012 European Taekwondo Championships
- Volleyball: Men's CEV Champions League 2011-12
- Volleyball: Women's CEV Champions League 2011-12
- Water Polo: 2012 Men's European Water Polo Championship
- Water Polo: 2012 Women's European Water Polo Championship
- Weightlifting: 2012 European Weightlifting Championships

== Oceanian Championships ==
- Badminton: 2012 Oceania Badminton Championships
- Athletics: 2012 Oceania Athletics Championships
- Football (soccer): OFC Champions League 2011-12
- Football (soccer): 2012 OFC Nations Cup
- Handball: 2012 Oceania Handball Championship
- Swimming: 2012 Oceania Swimming Championships

== Pan American Championship ==
- Judo: 2012 Pan American Judo Championships

=== North American Championship ===
- Football (soccer): 2011–12 CONCACAF Champions League

=== South American Championship ===
- Football (soccer): 2012 Copa Libertadores

== See also ==
- Continental championship (disambiguation)
