= 2004 World Cup =

2004 World Cup can refer to:

- The 2004 World Cup of Hockey
- The 2004 Alpine Skiing World Cup
- The 2004 Speedway World Cup
- The 2004 ISSF World Cup

== See also ==
- 2004 Continental Championships (disambiguation)
- 2004 World Championships (disambiguation)
- 2004 World Junior Championships (disambiguation)
