= 2004 World Junior Championships =

2004 World Junior Championships may refer to:

- Figure skating: 2004 World Junior Figure Skating Championships
- Ice hockey: 2004 World Junior Ice Hockey Championships
- Motorcycle speedway: 2004 Individual Speedway Junior World Championship

== See also ==
- 2004 World Cup (disambiguation)
- 2004 Continental Championships (disambiguation)
- 2004 World Championships (disambiguation)
