= 1961–62 Volleyball Women's European Cup =

The 1961–62 Volleyball Women's European Cup was the second edition of the competition for women's volleyball national champions in Europe. It was contested by ten teams, two less than the inaugural edition, and the quarterfinals and semifinals were replaced by a group stage. The competition was again won by the Soviet representative, as Burevestnik Odessa defeated Slavia Sofia in the final.

== Preliminary round ==
Team #1	Agg.	Team #2	1st	2nd
Olimpia Wien (Austria)	?–?	(Czechoslovakia) Tatran Střešovice	?–?	0–3
Petofi Budapest (Hungary)	?–?	(East Germany) Rotation Leipzig	0–3	?–?

== Group stage ==
Pl	Team	Pld	W	L	SW	SL
1	(Soviet Union) Burevestnik Odessa	3	3	0	9	?
2	(Romania) Dinamo Bucharest	3	?	?	?	?
3	(Socialist Federal Republic of Yugoslavia) Partizan Belgrade	3	?	?	?	?
4	(France) Tourcoing	3	?	?	?	?

	(Soviet Union) BUR	(Romania) DIN	(Socialist Federal Republic of Yugoslavia) PAR	(France) TOU
(Soviet Union) Burevestnik Odessa		3–?	3–?	3–0
(Romania) Dinamo Bucharest			3–1	?–?
(Socialist Federal Republic of Yugoslavia) Partizan Belgrade				?–?
(France) Tourcoing				

Pl	Team	Pld	W	L	SW	SL
1	(Bulgaria) Slavia Sofia	3	3	0	9	0
2	(Poland) Legia Warsaw	3	2	1	6	5
3	(East Germany) Rotation Leipzig	3	1	2	6	6
4	(Czechoslovakia) Tatran Střešovice	3	0	3	1	9

	(Bulgaria) SLA	(Poland) LEG	(East Germany) ROT	(Czechoslovakia) TAT
(Bulgaria) Slavia Sofia		3–0	3–0	3–0
(Poland) Legia Warsaw			3–2	3–0
(East Germany) Rotation Leipzig				3–1
(Czech Republic) Tatran Střešovice				

== Final ==
Team #1	Agg.	Team #2	1st	2nd
Slavia Sofia (Bulgaria)	1–6	(Soviet Union) Burevestnik Odessa	1–3	0–3

Women's Volleyball European Cup
1961-62 Champions
(Soviet Union) Burevestnik Odessa
First title
