= 2005–06 CEV Women's Champions League =

- League: CEV Women's Champions League
- Sport: Volleyball

CEV Women's Champions League seasons
- ← 2004–05 2006–07 →

The 2005–06 CEV Women's Champions League was the highest level of European club volleyball in the 2005–06 season.

== Group stage ==
=== Pool A ===
Pos	Team	Pld	W	L	Pts	SW	SL	SR	SPW	SPL	SPR
1	(France) RC Cannes	10	9	1	19	29	9	3.222	889	735	1.210
2	(Italy) Foppapedretti Bergamo	10	9	1	19	28	10	2.800	887	742	1.195
3	(Spain) Hotel Cantur Las Palmas	10	5	5	15	19	20	0.950	825	834	0.989
4	(Russia) Uralochka-NTMK Yekaterinburg	10	4	6	14	16	18	0.889	756	773	0.978
5	(Turkey) Eczacıbaşı Istanbul	10	3	7	13	17	24	0.708	871	933	0.934
6	(Portugal) CA Trofa	10	0	10	10	2	30	0.067	580	791	0.733

=== Pool B ===
Pos	Team	Pld	W	L	Pts	SW	SL	SR	SPW	SPL	SPR
1	(Italy) Pallavolo Sirio Perugia	10	9	1	19	29	6	4.833	835	684	1.221
2	(Turkey) Vakıfbank Günes Istanbul	10	6	4	16	22	19	1.158	927	861	1.077
3	(Azerbaijan) Azerrail Baku	10	6	4	16	21	19	1.105	869	872	0.997
4	(Spain) Tenerife Marichal	10	5	5	15	19	17	1.118	826	789	1.047
5	(Poland) Grześki Goplana Kalisz	10	4	6	14	20	21	0.952	868	919	0.945
6	(Croatia) Mladost Zagreb	10	0	10	10	1	30	0.033	577	777	0.743

== Play-off 6 ==
- 1st leg 14–15 February 2006
- 2nd leg 21–23 February 2006

Team #1	Results	Team #2
Foppapedretti Bergamo (Italy)	3 – 1 (21-25, 25–15, 25–13, 25–18); 3 – 2 (27-29, 22–25, 25–11, 25–22, 15–6)	(Azerbaijan) Azerrail Baku
Vakıfbank Günes Istanbul (Turkey)	3 – 0 (29-27, 25–17, 25-23); 2 – 3 (23-25, 25–23, 25–22, 21–25, 7–15)	(Spain) Hotel Cantur Las Palmas
Uralochka-NTMK Yekaterinburg (Russia)	2 – 3 (26-28, 25–17, 23–25, 25–23, 13–15); 0 – 3 (21-25, 19–25, 21-25)	(Italy) Pallavolo Sirio Perugia

== Final four ==
- venue: Cannes, France
- dates: 18–19 March 2006

Semi-finals
18 March
(France) RC Cannes	3
(Italy) Volley Bergamo	1
18 March
(Italy) Sirio Perugia	3
(Turkey) Vakıfbank Günes Istanbul	2

Final
19 March
(France) RC Cannes	1
(Italy) Sirio Perugia	3
3rd place
19 March
(Italy) Volley Bergamo	3
(Turkey) Vakıfbank Günes Istanbul	0

=== Semi-finals ===
	Score		Set 1	Set 2	Set 3	Set 4	Set 5
RC Cannes (France)	3 – 1	(Italy) Foppapedretti Bergamo	25–16	25–20	13–25	25–13	
Pallavolo Sirio Perugia (Italy)	3 – 2	(Turkey) Vakıfbank Günes Istanbul	25–20	22–25	17–25	25–17	15–9

=== Third place match ===
	Score		Set 1	Set 2	Set 3	Set 4	Set 5
Foppapedretti Bergamo (Italy)	3 – 0	(Turkey) Vakıfbank Günes Istanbul	25–19	26–24	25–20		

=== Final ===
	Score		Set 1	Set 2	Set 3	Set 4	Set 5
RC Cannes (France)	1 – 3	(Italy) Pallavolo Sirio Perugia	23–25	20–25	25–22	20–25	

== Final standing ==
Rank	Team
1st place, gold medalist(s)	(Italy) Pallavolo Sirio Perugia
2nd place, silver medalist(s)	(France) RC Cannes
3rd place, bronze medalist(s)	(Italy) Foppapedretti Bergamo
4	(Turkey) Vakıfbank Günes Istanbul

2006–07 Women's Club European Champions

Pallavolo Sirio Perugia
1st title

Roster for Final Four
Walewska Oliveira, Alessia Morelli, Dorota Świeniewicz, Lucia Crisanti, Antonina Zetova, Chiara Di Iulio, Helia Souza, Laura Venturini, Chiara Arcangeli, Senna Ušić and Mirka Francia
Head coach
Massimo Barbolini

== Awards ==
- MVP: (France) Victoria Ravva, RC Cannes
- Best Scorer: (Turkey) Neslihan Darnel, Vakıfbank Günes Istanbul
- Best Spiker: (Cuba) Mirka Francia, Sirio Perugia
- Best Server: (Germany) Angelina Grün, Foppapedretti Bergamo
- Best Blocker: (Sweden) Angelica Ljungqvist, RC Cannes
- Best Setter: (Brazil) Hélia Souza, Sirio Perugia
- Best Libero: (Japan) Yuko Sano, RC Cannes

== See also ==
- 2005–06 CEV Champions League
