= 2004 World Championships =

2004 World Championships may refer to:

- Alpine skiing: Alpine World Ski Championships 2004
- Athletics: 2004 World Championships in Athletics
  - Cross-country running: 2004 IAAF World Cross Country Championships
  - Road running: 2004 IAAF World Road Running Championships
- Badminton: 2004 BWF World Championships
- Bandy: Bandy World Championship 2004
- Biathlon: Biathlon World Championships 2004
- Boxing: 2004 World Amateur Boxing Championships
- Chess: FIDE World Chess Championship 2004
- Curling:
  - 2004 World Men's Curling Championship
  - 2004 World Women's Curling Championship
- Darts: 2004 BDO World Darts Championship
- Darts: 2004 PDC World Darts Championship
- Figure skating: 2004 World Figure Skating Championships
- Ice hockey: 2004 Men's World Ice Hockey Championships
- Ice hockey: 2004 Women's World Ice Hockey Championships
- Netball: 2004 Netball World Championships
- Nordic skiing: FIS Nordic World Ski Championships 2004
- Speed skating:
  - Allround: 2004 World Allround Speed Skating Championships
  - Sprint: 2004 World Sprint Speed Skating Championships
  - Single distances: 2004 World Single Distance Speed Skating Championships

== See also ==
- 2004 World Cup (disambiguation)
- 2004 Continental Championships (disambiguation)
- 2004 World Junior Championships (disambiguation)
