= 2005 World Cup =

2005 World Cup can refer to:

- 2005 Alpine Skiing World Cup
- 2005 Baseball World Cup
- 2005 Boxing World Cup
- Chess World Cup 2005
- 2005 Women's Cricket World Cup
- 2005 Rugby World Cup Sevens
- 2005 ISSF World Cup
- 2005 Speedway World Cup

== See also ==
- 2005 Continental Championships (disambiguation)
- 2005 World Championships (disambiguation)
- 2005 World Junior Championships (disambiguation)
