= 2005 World Championships =

2005 World Championships may refer to:

- Alpine skiing: Alpine World Ski Championships 2005
- Aquatics: 2005 World Aquatics Championships
- Athletics: 2005 World Championships in Athletics
  - Cross-country running: 2005 IAAF World Cross Country Championships
  - Road running: 2005 IAAF World Half Marathon Championships
- Badminton: 2005 IBF World Championships
- Bandy: Bandy World Championship 2005
- Biathlon: Biathlon World Championships 2005
- Boxing: 2005 World Amateur Boxing Championships
- Chess: FIDE World Chess Championship 2005
- Curling:
  - 2005 World Men's Curling Championship
  - 2005 World Women's Curling Championship
- Darts: 2005 BDO World Darts Championship
- Darts: 2005 PDC World Darts Championship
- Figure skating: 2005 World Figure Skating Championships
- Ice hockey: 2005 Men's World Ice Hockey Championships
- Ice hockey: 2005 Women's World Ice Hockey Championships
- Nordic skiing: FIS Nordic World Ski Championships 2005
- Snooker: 2005 World Snooker Championship
- Speed skating:
  - Allround: 2005 World Allround Speed Skating Championships
  - Sprint: 2005 World Sprint Speed Skating Championships
  - Single distances: 2005 World Single Distance Speed Skating Championships
- Weightlifting: 2005 World Weightlifting Championships

== See also ==
- 2005 World Cup (disambiguation)
- 2005 Continental Championships (disambiguation)
- 2005 World Junior Championships (disambiguation)
