= Nadia Centoni =

Italian volleyball player

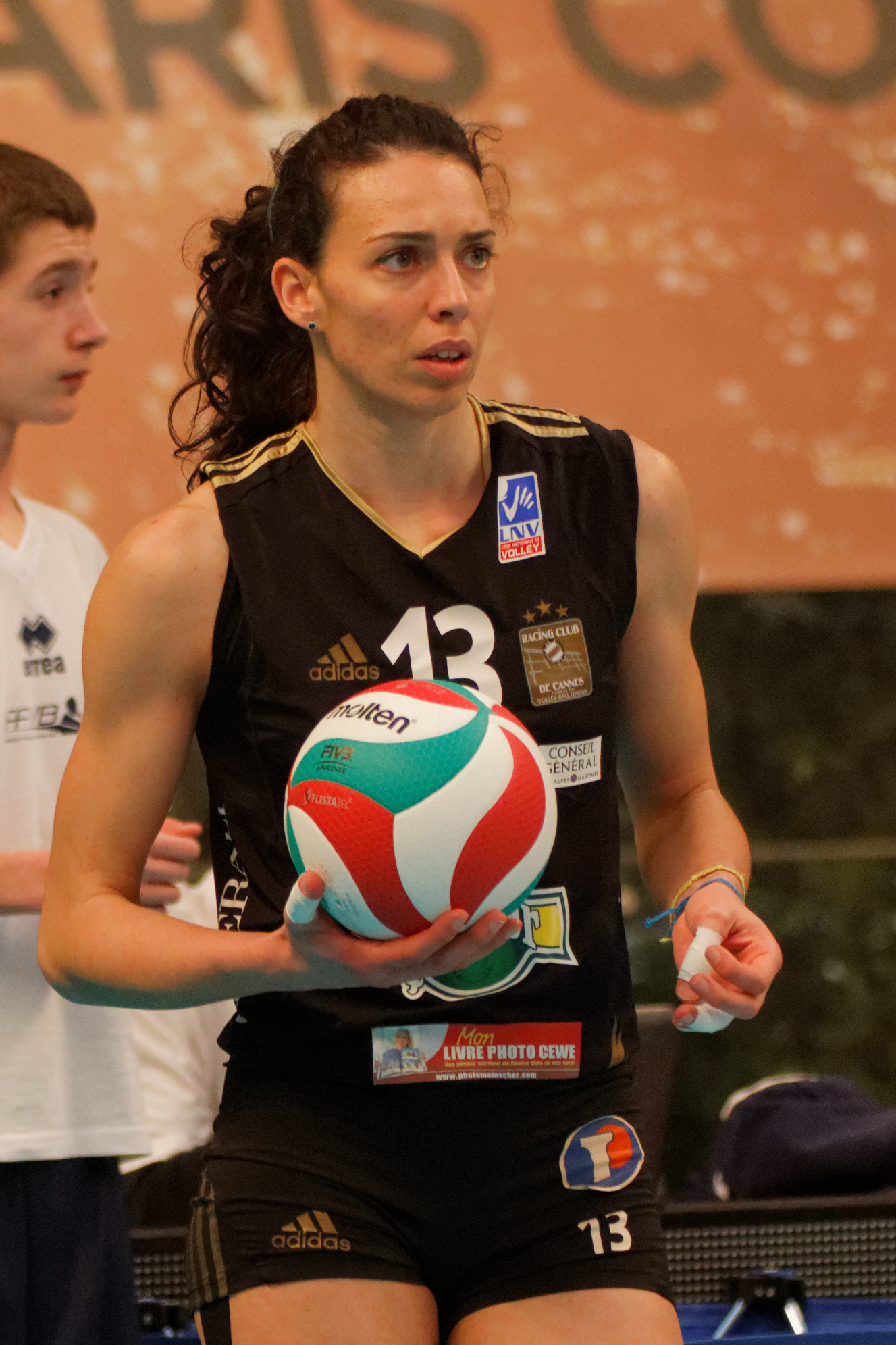

Personal information
- Full name: Nadia Centoni
- Born: June 19, 1981 (age 45) Barga, Italy
- Height: 1.82 m (5 ft 11 1/2 in)
- Spike: 320 cm (130 in)
- Block: 311 cm (122 in)

Volleyball information
- Position: Opposite spiker
- Current club: Galatasaray
- Number: 13

Career
- Years: Team
- 2001-2002 2002–2003 2003–2005 2005–2007 2007-2014 2014-2017 2017-2018: Asystel Novara; Volley Vincenza; Scavolini Pesaro; VC Padova; RC Cannes; Galatasaray; RC Cannes

National team
- Years: Team
- 2003–2016: Italy
Honours
Women's volleyball
Representing Italy
FIVB World Grand Prix
Silver medal – second place	2004 Reggio Calabria	Team
Bronze medal – third place	2006 Reggio Calabria	Team
European Championship
Silver medal – second place	2005 Croatia	Team

Nadia Centoni (Barga, 19 June 1981) is an Italian volleyball player. She currently plays for RC Cannes, playing as opposite.

== Career ==
Centoni played with her national team at the 2014 World Championship. There her team ended up in fourth place after losing 2-3 to Brazil the bronze medal match.

== Clubs ==
- (Italy) Club Italia (1998–1999)
- (Italy) Teseco Sesto Fiorentino (1999–2000)
- (Italy) Figurella Firenze (2000–2001)
- (Italy) Asystel Novara (2001–2002)
- (Italy) Minetti Infoplus Vicenza (2002–2003)
- (Italy) Scavolini Pesaro (2003–2005)
- (Italy) VC Padova (2005–2007)
- (France) RC Cannes (2007–2014)
- (Turkey) Galatasaray (2014–2017)
- (France) RC Cannes (2017–2018)

== Awards ==
=== Individuals ===
- 2009–10 CEV Champions League "Best Spiker"

== Clubs ==
- 2009–10 CEV Champions League — Bronze medal, with RC Cannes
- 2011–12 CEV Champions League — Runner-Up, with RC Cannes
- 2008–14 French Cup — (7 Titles) Champion, with RC Cannes
- 2008–14 French Championship — (7 Titles) Champion, with RC Cannes
- 2016–17 Turkish League — Runner-Up, with Galatasaray
