= Vedrana Jakšetić =

Croatian volleyball player (born 1996)

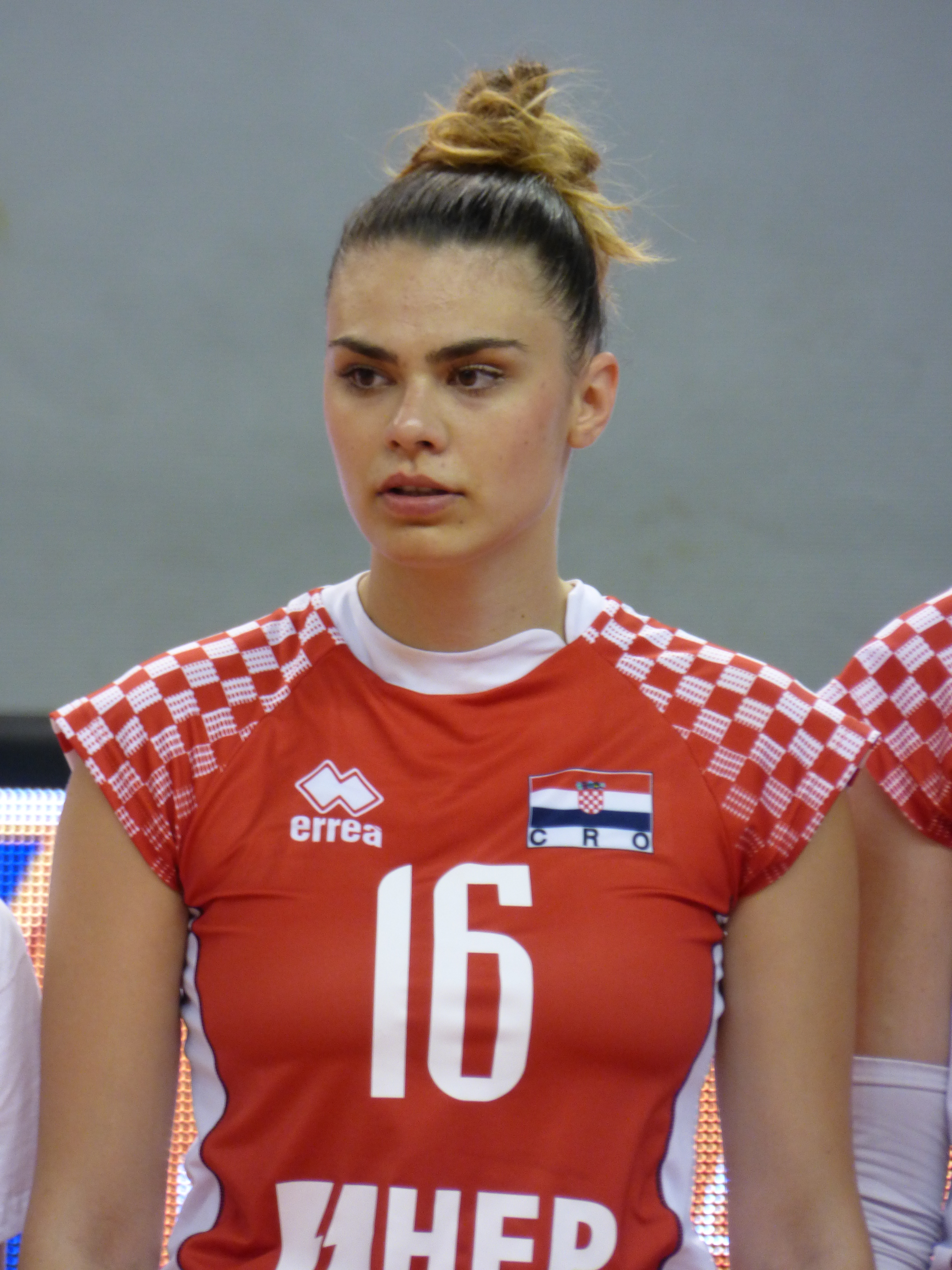

Personal information
- Born: 17 September 1996 (age 30) Osijek, Croatia
- Height: 1.83 m (6 ft 0 in)
- Weight: 72 kg (159 lb)
- Spike: 305 cm (120 in)
- Block: 299 cm (118 in)

Volleyball information
- Position: Setter
- Current club: Schweriner SC

Career
- Years: Team
- 2010–2013 2013–2017 2017–2019 2019–2020 2020–2024 2024–: ŽOK Osijek; OK Poreč; RC Cannes; Vandœuvre Nancy Volley-Ball; VfB Suhl LOTTO Thüringen; Schweriner SC

National team
- Years: Team
- Croatia
Honours
Women's volleyball
Representing Croatia
Mediterranean Games
Gold medal – first place	2018 Tarragona

Vedrana Jakšetić (born 17 September 1996) is a Croatian volleyball player. She plays as setter for German club Schweriner SC.
