= CEV Women's Champions League =

Top official competition for women's volleyball clubs of Europe

Women's CEV Champions League
- Current season, competition or edition: 2025–26 CEV Women's Champions League
- Formerly: CEV Champions Cup (1960–2000)
- Sport: Volleyball
- Founded: 1960; 66 years ago
- Administrator: CEV
- No. of teams: 20 (group stage)
- Country: CEV members
- Continent: Europe
- Most recent champions: (Turkey) VakıfBank S.K. (7th title)
- Most titles: (Soviet Union) WVC Dynamo Moscow (11 titles)
- Website: championsleague.cev.eu

The Women's CEV Champions League, formerly known as CEV Champions Cup (from 1960 to 2000), is the top official competition for women's volleyball clubs of Europe and takes place every year. It is organized by the Confédération Européenne de Volleyball (CEV) and was created in 1960 as CEV Champions Cup. On 13 November 2000, it was officially presented in Florence under a new format and renamed CEV Champions League.

== Formula ==
The competition has changed its format since the first fourteen teams took part at the inaugural edition in 1960–61. Through the Champions Cup era, as the number of participating teams has changed over time, the competition moved from an only knockout tournament to include a round-robin format between the final four competitors to determine the champion.

Since the competition became the Champions League, all participants are divided into groups, and a double round-robin takes place within each group. The best teams advance to the playoffs and one team is selected to be the host of the "Final four" (receiving a bye from the playoffs and qualifying directly to the final four). The teams paired for the playoffs play a double-elimination until three teams remain, these three teams join the final four host to play the semifinal, 3rd place match and final. The final four takes place between March and April.

== History ==
- CEV Champions Cup (1960 to 2000)
- CEV Champions League (2000 to present)

== Finals ==
=== Format notes ===
- From the 1960–61 to the 1970–71 season, the winner was decided through two-legged finals, except for the 1961–62 season, where the finalists qualified from a home-and-away group-stage round before the final.
- From the 1971–72 to the 1989–90 season, the final stage was played as a round-robin final round among four teams; no single final match was played.
- From the 1990–91 season onward, the competition used a single final match in the final stage / Final Four format.
- Where no third-place match was played, the losing semi-finalists are listed together.

#	Year	Final host city	Champion	Score	Runner-up	Third place / semi-finalist	Fourth place / semi-finalist
1	1960–61; Details	(Poland) Warsaw (Soviet Union) Moscow	(Soviet Union); Dynamo Moscow	3–2; 3–0 won 6–2 on aggregate	(Poland); AZS AWF Warsaw	Semi-finalists: (Romania) Dinamo Bucharest and (Czech Republic) Slavia Prague	
2	1961–62; Details	(Bulgaria) Sofia (Soviet Union) Odesa	(Soviet Union); Burevestnik Odesa	3–1; 3–0 won 6–1 on aggregate	(Bulgaria); Slavia Sofia	Second places in group stage: (Romania) Dinamo Bucharest and (Poland) Legia Warsaw	
3	1962–63; Details	(Soviet Union) Moscow (Poland) Warsaw	(Soviet Union); Dynamo Moscow	3–1; 3–2 won 6–3 on aggregate	(Poland); AZS AWF Warsaw	Semi-finalists: (Czech Republic) Dynamo Prague and (Bulgaria) Levski Sofia	
4	1963–64; Details	(Bulgaria) Sofia (East Germany) Berlin	(Bulgaria); Levski Sofia	3–0; 1–3 won 4–3 on aggregate	(East Germany); Dynamo Berlin	Semi-finalists: (Soviet Union) Dynamo Moscow and (Poland) AZS AWF Warsaw	
5	1964–65; Details	(East Germany) Berlin (Soviet Union) Moscow	(Soviet Union); Dynamo Moscow	3–0; 3–0 won 6–0 on aggregate	(East Germany); Dynamo Berlin	Semi-finalists: (Bulgaria) Levski Sofia and (Romania) Dinamo Bucharest	
6	1965–66; Details	(Soviet Union) Moscow	(Soviet Union); CSKA Moscow	3–0; 3–0 won 6–0 on aggregate	(Soviet Union); Dynamo Moscow	Semi-finalists: (Poland) AZS AWF Warsaw and (Bulgaria) Levski Sofia	
7	1966–67; Details	(Soviet Union) Moscow	(Soviet Union); CSKA Moscow	3–0; 3–0 won 6–0 on aggregate	(Soviet Union); Dynamo Moscow	Semi-finalists: (East Germany) Dynamo Berlin and (Bulgaria) Levski Sofia	
8	1967–68; Details	(Soviet Union) Moscow	(Soviet Union); Dynamo Moscow	3–0; 3–2 won 6–2 on aggregate	(Soviet Union); CSKA Moscow	Semi-finalists: (East Germany) DHFK Leipzig and (Romania) Dinamo Bucharest	
9	1968–69; Details	(Soviet Union) Moscow	(Soviet Union); Dynamo Moscow	3–1; 3–2 won 6–3 on aggregate	(Soviet Union); CSKA Moscow	Semi-finalists: (Bulgaria) Akademik Sofia and (Czechoslovakia) Slavia Bratislava	
10	1969–70; Details	(Hungary) Budapest (Soviet Union) Moscow	(Soviet Union); Dynamo Moscow	3–1; 3–0 won 6–1 on aggregate	(Hungary); NIM-SE Budapest	Semi-finalists: (Soviet Union) CSKA Moscow and (Czechoslovakia) Tatran Střešovice	
11	1970–71; Details	(Czechoslovakia) Prague (Soviet Union) Moscow	(Soviet Union); Dynamo Moscow	3–0; 3–0 won 6–0 on aggregate	(Czechoslovakia); Tatran Střešovice	Semi-finalists: (Bulgaria) Levski-Spartak Sofia and (Poland) Wisła Kraków	
12	1971–72; Details	(Belgium) La Louvière	(Soviet Union); Dynamo Moscow		(Czechoslovakia); Tatran Střešovice	(Soviet Union); Lokomotiv Moscow	(Poland); Start Łódź
13	1972–73; Details	(Netherlands) Apeldoorn	(Hungary); NIM-SE Budapest		(Soviet Union); Dynamo Moscow	(Poland); Start Łódź	(East Germany); Dynamo Berlin
14	1973–74; Details	(Poland) Warsaw	(Soviet Union); Dynamo Moscow		(Hungary); NIM-SE Budapest	(Bulgaria); Levski-Spartak Sofia	(East Germany); Dynamo Berlin
15	1974–75; Details	(Italy) Catania	(Soviet Union); Dynamo Moscow		(Bulgaria); Levski-Spartak Sofia	(Hungary); NIM-SE Budapest	(East Germany); Dynamo Berlin
16	1975–76; Details	(Poland) Warsaw	(Czechoslovakia); Rudá Hvězda Praha		(Bulgaria); Levski-Spartak Sofia	(Netherlands); Van Houten	(Socialist Federal Republic of Yugoslavia); Crvena zvezda Belgrad
17	1976–77; Details	(Turkey) İzmir	(Soviet Union); Dynamo Moscow		(Hungary); NIM-SE Budapest	(East Germany); Traktor Schwerin	(Bulgaria); Levski-Spartak Sofia
18	1977–78; Details	(West Germany) Rheine	(East Germany); Traktor Schwerin		(Hungary); NIM-SE Budapest	(Poland); Start Łódź	(Italy); Savoia Alzano
19	1978–79; Details	(Turkey) İzmir	(Bulgaria); CSKA Sofia		(Hungary); NIM-SE Budapest	(East Germany); Dynamo Berlin	(Czechoslovakia); Slávia Bratysława
20	1979–80; Details	(Czechoslovakia) Gottwaldov	(Czechoslovakia); Rudá Hvězda Praha		(Turkey); Eczacıbaşı Istanbul	(Albania); Dinamo Tirana	(Hungary); NIM/SE Budapest
21	1980–81; Details	(Liechtenstein) Schaan	(Soviet Union); Uralochka Sverdlovsk		(Bulgaria); Levski-Spartak Sofia	(East Germany); Traktor Schwerin	(Czechoslovakia); Slávia UK Bratislava
22	1981–82; Details	(Italy) Ravenna	(Soviet Union); Uralochka Sverdlovsk		(Netherlands); DVC Dokkum	(West Germany); SV Lohhof	(Bulgaria); Levski-Spartak Sofia
23	1982–83; Details	(Turkey) Ankara	(Soviet Union); Uralochka Sverdlovsk		(Hungary); Budapesti Vasas Izzó	(Czechoslovakia); Slávia UK Bratislava	(West Germany); SV Lohhof
24	1983–84; Details	(West Germany) Munich	(Bulgaria); CSKA Sofia		(Italy); Olimpia Teodora Ravenna	(West Germany); SV Lohhof	(Turkey); Eczacıbaşı Istanbul
25	1984–85; Details	(Italy) Forlì	(Soviet Union); ADK Alma-Ata		(Italy); Olimpia Teodora Ravenna	(Hungary); Tungsram SC Budapest	(West Germany); SV Lohhof
26	1985–86; Details	(Sweden) Uppsala	(Soviet Union); CSKA Moscow		(Italy); Olimpia Teodora Ravenna	(East Germany); Dynamo Berlin	(Poland); Czarni Słupsk
27	1986–87; Details	(West Germany) Karlsruhe	(Soviet Union); Uralochka Sverdlovsk		(Italy); Olimpia Teodora Ravenna	(East Germany); Dynamo Berlin	(Soviet Union); CSKA Moscow
28	1987–88; Details	(Greece) Thessaloniki	(Italy); Olimpia Teodora Ravenna		(Soviet Union); Uralochka Sverdlovsk	(East Germany); Dynamo Berlin	(Bulgaria); CSKA Sofia
29	1988–89; Details	(Belgium) Brussels	(Soviet Union); Uralochka Sverdlovsk		(Italy); Olimpia Teodora Ravenna	(East Germany); Dynamo Berlin	(Bulgaria); CSKA Sofia
30	1989–90; Details	(Italy) Forlì	(Soviet Union); Uralochka Sverdlovsk		(Italy); Olimpia Teodora Ravenna	(Albania); Dinamo Tirana	RC de France Paris
31	1990–91; Details	(Socialist Federal Republic of Yugoslavia) Zagreb	(Socialist Federal Republic of Yugoslavia); Mladost Zagreb	3–0	(Soviet Union); Uralochka Sverdlovsk	(Italy); Olimpia Teodora Ravenna	(Netherlands); Avero Sneek
32	1991–92; Details	(Italy) Ravenna	(Italy); Olimpia Teodora Ravenna	3–2	(Croatia); Mladost Zagreb	(Russia); Uralochka Ekaterinburg	(Germany); CJD Feuerbach
33	1992–93; Details	(Italy) Santeramo in Colle	(Italy); Parmalat Matera	3–1	(Italy); Olimpia Teodora Ravenna	(Russia); Uralochka Ekaterinburg	(Croatia); Mladost Zagreb
34	1993–94; Details	(Croatia) Zagreb	(Russia); Uralochka Ekaterinburg	3–2	(Croatia); Mladost Zagreb	(Italy); Latte Rugiada Matera	(Czech Republic); SK UP Olomouc
35	1994–95; Details	(Italy) Bari	(Russia); Uralochka Ekaterinburg	3–0	(Spain); CV Murcia	(Ukraine); Iskra Lugansk	(Italy); Parmalat Matera
36	1995–96; Details	(Austria) Vienna	(Italy); Parmalat Matera	3–2	(Russia); Uralochka Ekaterinburg	(Ukraine); Iskra Lugansk	(France); RC Cannes
37	1996–97; Details	(Italy) Bergamo	(Italy); Foppapedretti Bergamo	3–1	(Russia); Uralochka Ekaterinburg	(France); RC Cannes	(Italy); Parmalat Matera
38	1997–98; Details	(Croatia) Dubrovnik	(Croatia); OK Dubrovnik	3–0	(Turkey); Vakıfbank Ankara	(Italy); Foppapedretti Bergamo	(France); VBC Riom
39	1998–99; Details	(Italy) Bergamo	(Italy); Foppapedretti Bergamo	3–0	(Turkey); Vakıfbank Ankara	(France); RC Cannes	(Spain); CV Tenerife
40	1999–00; Details	(Turkey) Bursa	(Italy); Foppapedretti Bergamo	3–1	(Russia); Uralochka Ekaterinburg	(Turkey); Eczacıbaşı Istanbul	(Poland); Nafta Piła
41	2000–01; Details	(Russia) Nizhny Tagil	(Italy); Volley Modena	3–0	(Italy); Capo Sud Reggio Calabria	(Russia); Uralochka Ekaterinburg	(Turkey); Eczacıbaşı Istanbul
42	2001–02; Details	(Turkey) Istanbul	(France); RC Cannes	3–1	(Italy); Foppapedretti Bergamo	(Spain); Tenerife Marichal	(Turkey); Eczacıbaşı Istanbul
43	2002–03; Details	(Poland) Piła	(France); RC Cannes	3–1	(Russia); Uralochka Ekaterinburg	(Italy); Foppapedretti Bergamo	(Italy); Volley Modena
44	2003–04; Details	(Spain) Tenerife	(Spain); Tenerife Marichal	3–2	(Italy); Pallavolo Sirio Perugia	(France); RC Cannes	(Azerbaijan); Azerrail Baku
45	2004–05; Details	(Spain) Tenerife	(Italy); Foppapedretti Bergamo	3–0	(Italy); Sant'Orsola Asystel Novara	(Spain); Tenerife Marichal	(France); RC Cannes
46	2005–06; Details	(France) Cannes	(Italy); Pallavolo Sirio Perugia	3–1	(France); RC Cannes	(Italy); Foppapedretti Bergamo	(Turkey); Vakıfbank Güneş Istanbul
47	2006–07; Details	(Switzerland) Zürich	(Italy); Foppapedretti Bergamo	3–2	(Russia); Dinamo Moscow	(Spain); Spar Tenerife Marichal	(Switzerland); Voléro Zürich
48	2007–08; Details	(Spain) Murcia	(Italy); Colussi Perugia	3–1	(Russia); Zarechie Odintsovo	(Italy); Asystel Novara	(Spain); Grupo 2002 Murcia
49	2008–09; Details	(Italy) Perugia	(Italy); Volley Bergamo	3–2	(Russia); Dinamo Moscow	(Italy); Colussi Sirio Perugia	(Turkey); Eczacıbaşı Zentiva Istanbul
50	2009–10; Details	(France) Cannes	(Italy); Volley Bergamo	3–2	(Turkey); Fenerbahçe Acıbadem	(France); RC Cannes	(Italy); Asystel Novara
51	2010–11; Details	(Turkey) Istanbul	(Turkey); VakıfBank Güneş Sigorta Türk Telekom Istanbul	3–0	(Azerbaijan); Rabita Baku	(Turkey); Fenerbahçe Acıbadem	(Italy); Scavolini Pesaro
52	2011–12; Details	(Azerbaijan) Baku	(Turkey); Fenerbahçe Universal	3–0	(France); RC Cannes	(Russia); Dinamo Kazan	(Italy); MC-Carnaghi Villa Cortese
53	2012–13; Details	(Turkey) Istanbul	(Turkey); Vakıfbank Istanbul	3–0	(Azerbaijan); Rabita Baku	(Italy); Unendo Yamamay Busto Arsizio	(Turkey); Galatasaray Daikin
54	2013–14; Details	(Azerbaijan) Baku	(Russia); Dinamo Kazan	3–0	(Turkey); Vakıfbank Istanbul	(Azerbaijan); Rabita Baku	(Turkey); Eczacıbaşı VitrA Istanbul
55	2014–15; Details	(Poland) Szczecin	(Turkey); Eczacıbaşı VitrA Istanbul	3–0	(Italy); Unendo Yamamay Busto Arsizio	(Turkey); Vakıfbank Istanbul	(Poland); Chemik Police
56	2015–16; Details	(Italy) Montichiari	(Italy); Pomì Casalmaggiore	3–0	(Turkey); Vakıfbank Istanbul	(Turkey); Fenerbahçe Grundig	(Russia); Dinamo Kazan
57	2016–17; Details	(Italy) Treviso	(Turkey); VakıfBank Istanbul	3–0	(Italy); Imoco Volley Conegliano	(Turkey); Eczacıbaşı VitrA Istanbul	(Russia); Dinamo Moscow
58	2017–18; Details	(Romania) Bucharest	(Turkey); VakıfBank Istanbul	3–0	(Romania); CSM Volei Alba Blaj	(Italy); Imoco Volley Conegliano	(Turkey); Galatasaray Daikin
59	2018–19; Details	(Germany) Berlin	(Italy); Igor Gorgonzola Novara	3–1	(Italy); Imoco Volley Conegliano	Semi-finalists: (Turkey) Vakıfbank Istanbul and (Turkey) Fenerbahçe SK Istanbul	
60	2019–20; Details	(Germany) Berlin (planned)	Cancelled due to the COVID-19 pandemic				
61	2020–21; Details	(Italy) Verona	(Italy); Imoco Volley Conegliano	3–2	(Turkey); Vakıfbank Istanbul	Semi-finalists: (Italy) Igor Gorgonzola Novara and (Italy) Unet E-Work Busto Arsizio	
62	2021–22; Details	(Slovenia) Ljubljana	(Turkey); Vakıfbank Istanbul	3–1	(Italy); Imoco Volley Conegliano	(Turkey); Fenerbahçe Opet Istanbul	
63	2022–23; Details	(Italy) Turin	(Turkey); Vakıfbank Istanbul	3–1	(Turkey); Eczacıbaşı Dynavit	Semi-finalists: (Turkey) Fenerbahçe Opet Istanbul and (Italy) Igor Gorgonzola Novara	
64	2023–24; Details	(Turkey) Antalya	(Italy); Imoco Volley Conegliano	3–2	(Italy); Vero Volley Milano	(Turkey) Eczacıbaşı Dynavit and (Turkey) Fenerbahçe SK Istanbul	
65	2024–25; Details	(Turkey) Istanbul	(Italy); Imoco Volley Conegliano	3–0	(Italy); Scandicci	(Italy); Vero Volley Milano	(Turkey); VakıfBank Istanbul
66	2025–26; Details	(Turkey) Istanbul	(Turkey); VakıfBank Istanbul	3–1	(Turkey); Eczacıbaşı Dynavit	(Italy); Imoco Volley Conegliano	(Italy); Scandicci

== Titles by club ==
Rank	Club	Titles	Runners-up	Champion years
1	(Soviet Union) (Russia) WVC Dynamo Moscow	11	5	1960–61, 1962–63, 1964–65, 1967–68, 1968–69, 1969–70, 1970–71, 1971–72, 1973–74, 1974–75, 1976–77
2	(Soviet Union) (Russia) Uralochka Ekaterinburg	8	6	1980–81, 1981–82, 1982–83, 1986–87, 1988–89, 1989–90, 1993–94, 1994–95
3	(Turkey) VakıfBank S.K.	7	5	2010–11, 2012–13, 2016–17, 2017–18, 2021–22, 2022–23, 2025–26
4	(Italy) Volley Bergamo	7	1	1996–97, 1998–99, 1999–00, 2004–05, 2006–07, 2008–09, 2009–10
5	(Italy) Imoco Volley Conegliano	3	3	2020–21, 2023–24, 2024–25
6	(Soviet Union) CSKA Moscow	3	2	1965–66, 1966–67, 1985–86
7	(Italy) Olimpia Teodora Ravenna	2	7	1987–88, 1991–92
8	(France) RC Cannes	2	2	2001–02, 2002–03
9	(Italy) Pallavolo Sirio Perugia	2	1	2005–06, 2007–08
10	(Czechoslovakia) Rudá Hvězda Praha	2	—	1975–76, 1979–80
—	(Bulgaria) VC CSKA Sofia	2	—	1978–79, 1983–84
—	(Italy) Pallavolo Femminile Matera	2	—	1992–93, 1995–96
13	(Hungary) NIM-SE Budapest	1	5	1972–73
14	(Bulgaria) Levski Sofia	1	3	1963–64
15	(Socialist Federal Republic of Yugoslavia) (Croatia) HAOK Mladost	1	2	1990–91
—	(Turkey) Eczacıbaşı Istanbul	1	3	2014–15
17	(Turkey) Fenerbahçe	1	1	2011–12
18	(Soviet Union) Burevestnik Odesa	1	—	1961–62
—	(East Germany) Traktor Schwerin	1	—	1977–78
—	(Soviet Union) ADK Alma-Ata	1	—	1984–85
—	(Croatia) OK Dubrovnik	1	—	1997–98
—	(Italy) Volley Modena	1	—	2000–01
—	(Spain) CV Tenerife	1	—	2003–04
—	(Russia) WVC Dynamo Kazan	1	—	2013–14
—	(Italy) Volley Casalmaggiore	1	—	2015–16
—	(Italy) Igor Gorgonzola Novara	1	—	2018–19
27	(Poland) AZS AWF Warsaw	—	2	—
—	(East Germany) SC Dynamo Berlin	—	2	—
—	(Czechoslovakia) Tatran Střešovice	—	2	—
—	(Azerbaijan) Rabita Baku	—	2	—
31	(Bulgaria) Slavia Sofia	—	1	—
—	(Netherlands) DVC Dokkum	—	1	—
—	(Hungary) Budapesti Vasas Izzó	—	1	—
—	(Spain) CV Murcia	—	1	—
—	(Italy) Virtus Reggio Calabria	—	1	—
—	(Italy) Asystel Volley	—	1	—
—	(Russia) VC Zarechie Odintsovo	—	1	—
—	(Italy) Futura Volley Busto Arsizio	—	1	—
—	(Romania) CSM Volei Alba Blaj	—	1	—
—	(Italy) Vero Volley Milano	—	1	—
—	(Italy) Scandicci	—	1	—

== Titles by country ==
For the purpose of keeping historical event accuracy, historical country names are used in this table.

Rank	Country	Won	Runners-up	Total
1	Soviet Union	22	7	29
2	Italy	19	17	36
3	Turkey	9	9	18
4	Russia	3	7	10
5	Bulgaria	3	4	7
6	France	2	2	4
6	Czechoslovakia	2	2	4
8	Hungary	1	6	7
9	Croatia	1	2	3
9	East Germany	1	2	3
11	Spain	1	1	2
12	Yugoslavia	1	—	1
13	Azerbaijan	—	2	2
13	Poland	—	2	2
15	Netherlands	—	1	1
15	Romania	—	1	1

== Most valuable player by edition ==
- 2001–02 – Victoria Ravva (FRA) – RC Cannes
- 2002–03 – Victoria Ravva (FRA) – RC Cannes
- 2003–04 – Yelena Godina (RUS) – Tenerife Marichal
- 2004–05 – Lyubov Sokolova (RUS) – Foppapedretti Bergamo
- 2005–06 – Victoria Ravva (FRA) – RC Cannes
- 2006–07 – Angelina Grün (GER) – Foppapedretti Bergamo
- 2007–08 – Simona Gioli (ITA) – Colussi Perugia
- 2008–09 – Serena Ortolani (ITA) – Volley Bergamo
- 2009–10 – Francesca Piccinini (ITA) – Volley Bergamo
- 2010–11 – Małgorzata Glinka (POL) – VakıfBank Güneş Sigorta Türk Telekom
- 2011–12 – Kim Yeon-Koung (KOR) – Fenerbahçe Universal
- 2012–13 – Jovana Brakočević (SRB) – VakıfBank Istanbul
- 2013–14 – Yekaterina Gamova (RUS) – Dinamo Kazan
- 2014–15 – Jordan Larson (USA) – Eczacıbaşı VitrA Istanbul
- 2015–16 – Francesca Piccinini (ITA) – Pomì Casalmaggiore
- 2016–17 – Zhu Ting (CHN) – VakıfBank Istanbul
- 2017–18 – Gözde Kırdar Sonsırma (TUR) – VakıfBank Istanbul
- 2018–19 – Paola Egonu (ITA) – Igor Gorgonzola Novara
- 2019–20 – Competition cancelled
- 2020–21 – Paola Egonu (ITA) – Imoco Volley Conegliano
- 2021–22 – Gabriela Guimarães (BRA) – VakıfBank Istanbul
- 2022–23 – Paola Egonu (ITA) – VakıfBank Istanbul
- 2023–24 – Isabelle Haak (SWE) – Imoco Volley Conegliano
- 2024–25 – Isabelle Haak (SWE) – Imoco Volley Conegliano
- 2025–26 – Tijana Bošković (SRB) – VakıfBank Istanbul

== All-time team records ==
Winners and finalists by city since 1960/1961

Location	Winners	Finalists
Moscow (Russia)	14	7
Istanbul (Turkey)	8	6
Yekaterinburg (Russia)	8	6
Bergamo (Italy)	7	1
Sofia (Bulgaria)	3	4
Ravenna (Italy)	2	7
Cannes (France)	2	2
Praha (Czech Republic)	2	2
Matera (Italy)	2	1
Perugia (Italy)	2	1
Budapest (Hungary)	1	6
Zagreb (Croatia)	1	2
Tenerife (Spain)	1	0
Schwerin (Germany)	1	0
Alma-Ata (Kazakhstan)	1	0
Casalmaggiore	1	0
Conegliano (Italy)	1	0
Dubrovnik (Croatia)	1	0
Kazan	1	0
Modena (Italy)	1	0
Novara	1	0
Odesa (Ukraine)	1	0
Berlin (Germany)		2
Conegliano		2
Tirana (Albania)		2
Ankara (Turkey)		2
Baku (Azerbaijan)		2
Warszawa (Poland)		2
Novara (Italy)		1
Blaj		1
Busto Arsizio		1
Dokkum (Netherlands)		1
Odintsovo (Russia)		1
Reggio di Calabria (Italy)		1
Luhansk (Ukraine)		
Unterschleißheim (Germany)		
Baku		
Bratislava (Slovakia)		
Busto Arsizio (Italy)		
Heerlen (Netherlands)		
Kazan (Russia)		
Lódz (Poland)		

Various statistics since 1990/1991

Number of appearances
1	Cannes RC	23
2	Eczacibasi Istanbul	21
3	Vakifbank Istanbul	21
4	Uralochka NTMK Ekaterinbur.	19
5	WVC Dynamo Moscow	16
6	Volley Bergamo	13
7	Fenerbahçe Istanbul	12
8	HAOK Mladost Zagreb	12
9	Tenerife	12
10	VB Niederösterreich Sokol/.	12

Number of matches
1	Cannes RC	198
2	Vakifbank Istanbul	193
3	Eczacibasi Istanbul	186
4	Uralochka NTMK Ekaterinbur.	149
5	Volley Bergamo	138
6	WVC Dynamo Moscow	131
7	Tenerife	107
8	Fenerbahçe Istanbul	98
9	Azerrail Baku	90
10	Voléro Zürich	88

Wins
1	Vakifbank Istanbul	141
2	Cannes RC	127
3	Eczacibasi Istanbul	121
4	Volley Bergamo	112
5	Uralochka NTMK Ekaterinbur.	95
6	WVC Dynamo Moscow	85
7	Fenerbahçe Istanbul	72
8	Tenerife	58
9	Dinamo Kazan	50
10	Voléro Zürich	48

Number of wins in games played
1	Volley Modena	85%
2	Palac Bydgoszcz	83%
3	Sirio Perugia	81%
4	Volley Bergamo	81%
5	Olimpia Teodora Ravenna	80%
6	Pieralisi Jesi	80%
7	Reggio Calabria	80%
8	Imoco Volley Conegliano	78%
9	IG Novara Trecate	76%
10	Casalmaggiore	75%

(Based on W=2 pts and D=1 pts)

	Team	S	Firs	Best	Pts	MP	W	L	GF	GA	diff
1	Vakifbank Istanbul (TUR)	21	1993/1994	1st	334	193	141	52	475	240	+235
2	Cannes RC (FRA)	23	1995/1996	1st	325	198	127	71	442	289	+153
3	Eczacibasi Istanbul (TUR)	21	1994/1995	1st	307	186	121	65	420	271	+149
4	Volley Bergamo (ITA)	13	1996/1997	1st	250	138	112	26	365	139	+226
5	Uralochka NTMK Ekaterinburg (RUS)	19	1990/1991	1st	244	149	95	54	330	220	+110
6	WVC Dynamo Moscow (RUS)	16	2006/2007	2nd	216	131	85	46	300	198	+102
7	Fenerbahçe Istanbul (TUR)	12	2007/2008	1st	170	98	72	26	246	107	+139
8	Tenerife (SPA)	12	1997/1998	1st	165	107	58	49	207	179	+28
9	Voléro Zürich (SWI)	10	2006/2007	4th	136	88	48	40	185	156	+29
10	Azerrail Baku (AZE)	11	2002/2003	4th	136	90	46	44	172	163	+9
11	Dinamo Kazan (RUS)	9	2011/2012	1st	124	74	50	24	169	96	+73
12	VB Niederösterreich Sokol/Post SV (AUT)	12	1990/1991	-	115	78	37	41	131	140	-9
13	Imoco Volley Conegliano (ITA)	7	2013/2014	1st	105	59	46	13	153	67	+86
14	Telekom Baku (AZE)	7	2010/2011	2nd	95	60	35	25	122	97	+25
15	HAOK Mladost Zagreb (CRO)	12	1990/1991	1st	84	60	24	36	78	113	-35
16	Scavolini Pesaro (ITA)	5	2006/2007	4th	83	48	35	13	115	65	+50
17	VK Prostejov (CZE)	10	2008/2009	-	82	66	16	50	75	170	-95
18	Energa MKS Kalisz (POL)	6	1997/1998	-	78	52	26	26	101	94	+7
19	Schweriner SC (GER)	9	1995/1996	-	78	58	20	38	86	128	-42
20	Sirio Perugia (ITA)	4	2003/2004	1st	76	42	34	8	116	46	+70
21	Asystel Novara (ITA)	4	2003/2004	2nd	76	44	32	12	107	52	+55
22	IG Novara Trecate (ITA)	6	2015/2016	1st	72	41	31	10	101	49	+52
23	Pila PTPS (POL)	6	1999/2000	4th	70	47	23	24	83	85	-2
24	KPS Chemik Police (POL)	8	1994/1995	4th	69	46	23	23	85	85	0
25	MKS Muszyna (POL)	6	2006/2007	-	68	48	20	28	80	101	-21
26	Matera (ITA)	5	1992/1993	1st	64	37	27	10	91	39	+52
27	Dresdner SC (GER)	8	1999/2000	-	64	49	15	34	59	119	-60
28	Busto Arsizio (ITA)	4	2012/2013	2nd	63	40	23	17	86	69	+17
29	Mulhouse ASPTT (FRA)	10	2007/2008	-	63	52	11	41	56	129	-73
30	Zarechie Odintsovo (RUS)	4	2007/2008	2nd	59	38	21	17	79	69	+10
31	VK Slavia Bratislava (SVK)	6	1991/1992	-	59	37	22	15	72	62	+10
32	Iskra Luhansk (UKR)	5	1992/1993	3rd	57	33	24	9	78	42	+36
33	CS Rapid Bucuresti (ROM)	7	1992/1993	-	53	38	15	23	58	78	-20
34	SK UP Olomouc (CZE)	7	1993/1994	4th	52	38	14	24	56	86	-30
35	MTV Stuttgart (GER)	4	2015/2016	-	50	33	17	16	62	56	+6
36	CV Las Palmas (SPA)	5	2003/2004	-	50	36	14	22	59	78	-19
37	Trefl Sopot (POL)	4	2011/2012	-	49	32	17	15	58	55	+3
38	Nova Branik Maribor (SLO)	8	1992/1993	-	49	42	7	35	33	107	-74
39	Red Star Beograd (SCG)	7	2002/2003	-	49	44	5	39	39	121	-82
40	Bielsko-Biala (POL)	6	1990/1991	-	47	35	12	23	56	82	-26
41	VC Antonius / VT Herentals Dames (BEL)	7	1990/1991	-	46	33	13	20	48	67	-19
42	Levski Siconco Sofia (BUL)	6	1990/1991	-	46	34	12	22	48	71	-23
43	BTV Luzern (SWI)	6	1991/1992	-	46	34	12	22	46	72	-26
44	FC Vrilissia (GRE)	4	1995/1996	-	45	30	15	15	56	55	+1
45	Panathinaikos Athens (GRE)	6	1990/1991	-	45	30	15	15	55	55	0
46	Alba Blaj CSV (ROM)	5	2015/2016	2nd	45	30	15	15	51	58	-7
47	Jedinstvo Uzice (SCG)	7	1995/1996	-	45	36	9	27	39	90	-51
48	ZOK Rijeka (CRO)	5	1999/2000	-	44	35	9	26	34	85	-51
49	Savino Del Bene Scandicci (ITA)	3	2018/2019	-	43	26	17	9	62	38	+24
50	USC Münster (GER)	4	1992/1993	-	41	26	15	11	52	41	+11
51	Galatasaray Istanbul (TUR)	3	2012/2013	4th	41	26	15	11	57	47	+10
52	Villa Cortese (ITA)	3	2010/2011	4th	41	28	13	15	57	56	+1
53	Dabrowa Górnicza (POL)	4	2009/2010	-	41	30	11	19	49	64	-15
54	Nordmeccanica Piacenza (ITA)	3	2013/2014	-	40	26	14	12	51	44	+7
55	Maritza Plovdiv (BUL)	6	2016/2017	-	40	32	8	24	43	80	-37
56	Dela Martinus Amstelveen (NED)	3	2006/2007	-	39	26	13	13	50	48	+2
57	Budowlani Lódz (POL)	4	2010/2011	-	39	28	11	17	39	61	-22
58	Volley Modena (ITA)	2	2000/2001	1st	37	20	17	3	56	27	+29
59	Olimpia Teodora Ravenna (ITA)	3	1990/1991	1st	36	20	16	4	51	18	+33
60	Pieralisi Jesi (ITA)	2	2006/2007	-	36	20	16	4	51	29	+22
61	Vakifbank Ankara (TUR)	3	1992/1993	2nd	34	20	14	6	43	30	+13
62	LKS Lódz (POL)	3	2018/2019	-	34	22	12	10	40	41	-1
63	ZOK Dubrovnik (CRO)	2	1997/1998	1st	30	18	12	6	39	25	+14
64	Emlakbank Ankara (TUR)	3	1990/1991	-	28	18	10	8	38	27	+11
65	Partizan Vizura Beograd (SCG)	4	2014/2015	-	28	22	6	16	28	53	-25
66	VVC Vught (NED)	3	1993/1994	-	27	20	7	13	30	43	-13
67	Lokomotiv Baku (AZE)	2	2012/2013	-	26	16	10	6	35	27	+8
68	PVK Olymp Praha (CZE)	3	1992/1993	-	26	20	6	14	28	45	-17
69	Riom (FRA)	3	1993/1994	4th	25	15	10	5	33	25	+8
70	Türk Telekom Ankara (TUR)	2	2007/2008	-	24	16	8	8	27	27	0
71	Nantes Volley-Ball (FRA)	3	2014/2015	-	24	18	6	12	22	39	-17
72	Amkodor Minsk (BLR)	5	1993/1994	-	24	19	5	14	24	43	-19
73	Holte IF (DEN)	8	1990/1991	-	24	20	4	16	15	49	-34
74	Omichka Omsk (RUS)	2	2013/2014	-	23	16	7	9	29	29	0
75	Developres Rzeszów (POL)	3	2017/2018	-	23	16	7	9	28	33	-5
76	RC Eger (HUN)	5	1991/1992	-	23	17	6	11	24	39	-15
77	Universidad Burgos (SPA)	2	2001/2002	-	22	16	6	10	24	33	-9
78	Hapoel Mate Asher (ISR)	5	1990/1991	-	22	16	6	10	22	32	-10
79	Dinamo Bucarest (ROM)	3	2010/2011	-	22	18	4	14	20	45	-25
80	LJ Volley Modena (ITA)	1	2016/2017	-	21	12	9	3	29	15	+14
81	Khimik Yuzhny Odesa (UKR)	3	2016/2017	-	20	16	4	12	22	39	-17
82	Minchanka Minsk (BLR)	5	2016/2017	-	20	16	4	12	14	42	-28
83	Calcit Volleyball Kamnik (SLO)	4	2015/2016	-	20	18	2	16	10	48	-38
84	CJD Feuerbach (GER)	2	1990/1991	4th	19	12	7	5	22	17	+5
85	Boavista Porto (POR)	3	1990/1991	-	19	15	4	11	16	34	-18
86	Reggio Calabria (ITA)	1	2000/2001	2nd	18	10	8	2	26	9	+17
87	Asterix Avo Beveren (BEL)	3	1998/1999	-	18	13	5	8	20	25	-5
88	Murcia 2005 (SPA)	2	2007/2008	4th	18	14	4	10	20	32	-12
89	VC Mamer (LUX)	5	1994/1995	-	18	14	4	10	13	30	-17
90	CJD Berlin (GER)	3	1991/1992	-	17	10	7	3	24	13	+11
91	Tongeren VC (BEL)	2	1994/1995	-	17	11	6	5	19	18	+1
92	VC Sneek (NED)	3	1990/1991	4th	17	12	5	7	21	24	-3
93	Vaasan Vasama (FIN)	5	1991/1992	-	17	12	5	7	15	25	-10
94	CSU Belor Galati (ROM)	2	2008/2009	-	17	14	3	11	14	36	-22
95	Postar 064 Beograd (SCG)	2	2007/2008	-	17	14	3	11	13	35	-22
96	Murcia (SPA)	2	1993/1994	2nd	16	10	6	4	20	15	+5
97	RC France (FRA)	3	1990/1991	-	16	11	5	6	22	22	0
98	Besiktas Istanbul (TUR)	1	2004/2005	-	16	12	4	8	20	30	-10
99	Volei 2004 Constanta (ROM)	2	2011/2012	-	16	12	4	8	12	31	-19
100	Vasas Budapest (HUN)	2	2019/2020	-	15	11	4	7	16	21	-5
101	SK ZU Zilina (SVK)	2	1996/1997	-	15	11	4	7	14	22	-8
102	Lokomotiv Kaliningrad (RUS)	3	2019/2020	-	15	12	3	9	16	27	-11
103	Stiinta Bacau (ROM)	2	2013/2014	-	15	12	3	9	10	31	-21
104	Universitatea Bacau (ROM)	2	1998/1999	-	15	13	2	11	11	35	-24
105	LP Viesti Salo (FIN)	4	2014/2015	-	15	14	1	13	12	40	-28
106	Casalmaggiore (ITA)	1	2015/2016	1st	14	8	6	2	22	10	+12
107	Orbita Zaporozhye (UKR)	1	1993/1994	-	14	8	6	2	18	6	+12
108	Universitatea Craiova (ROM)	2	1990/1991	-	14	9	5	4	15	13	+2
109	Dinamo Krasnodar (RUS)	1	2016/2017	-	14	10	4	6	17	23	-6
110	VV Pollux Oldenzaal (NED)	2	1998/1999	-	14	11	3	8	16	26	-10
111	CSKA Sofia (BUL)	3	1991/1992	-	14	11	3	8	12	27	-15
112	Impel Wroclaw (POL)	2	2014/2015	-	14	12	2	10	13	31	-18
113	Azeryol Baku (AZE)	1	2014/2015	-	13	8	5	3	17	13	+4
114	AMVJ Amstelveen (NED)	1	1995/1996	-	13	9	4	5	18	16	+2
115	Grundfos Bucuresti (ROM)	1	1997/1998	-	13	9	4	5	17	17	0
116	SK Frenstát Pod Radhostem (CZE)	1	1998/1999	-	13	9	4	5	16	16	0
117	Albacete (SPA)	1	1996/1997	-	13	9	4	5	13	19	-6
118	NRK Nyíregyháza (HUN)	3	2002/2003	-	13	10	3	7	13	23	-10
119	Béziers (FRA)	3	2013/2014	-	13	12	1	11	6	33	-27
120	Sliedrecht Sport (NED)	2	2017/2018	-	12	8	4	4	12	15	-3
121	RTV 1879 Basel (SWI)	2	1995/1996	-	12	9	3	6	11	20	-9
122	AEL Limassol (CYP)	4	1990/1991	-	12	10	2	8	6	24	-18
123	Palac Bydgoszcz (POL)	1	1993/1994	-	11	6	5	1	15	5	+10
124	Sandnes VBK (NOR)	2	1990/1991	-	11	8	3	5	11	15	-4
125	Tirana Volley (ALB)	2	1992/1993	-	11	8	3	5	10	15	-5
126	Universitet Belgorod (RUS)	1	2009/2010	-	11	8	3	5	11	18	-7
127	Igtisadchi Baku (AZE)	1	2013/2014	-	11	8	3	5	10	18	-8
128	Castelo Maia GC (POR)	5	1994/1995	-	11	10	1	9	5	28	-23
129	Tungsram SC Budapest (HUN)	1	1992/1993	-	10	6	4	2	13	9	+4
130	Dinamo Tirana (ALB)	3	1990/1991	-	10	9	1	8	5	24	-19
131	Gym-Volley Bonnevoie (LUX)	5	1990/1991	-	10	10	0	10	3	30	-27
132	Cat Trofa (POR)	1	2005/2006	-	10	10	0	10	2	30	-28
133	Hämeenlinna HPK (FIN)	2	2016/2017	-	9	8	1	7	6	21	-15
134	Britannia Music London (ENG)	2	1991/1992	-	8	6	2	4	8	12	-4
135	Forza Skopje (MKD)	2	1993/1994	-	8	6	2	4	6	12	-6
136	Granada CDU (SPA)	1	2000/2001	-	8	6	2	4	7	16	-9
137	Krug Cherkasy (UKR)	1	1998/1999	-	8	7	1	6	8	20	-12
138	Volero Le Cannet (FRA)	2	2015/2016	-	8	8	0	8	6	24	-18
139	ZOK Jedinstvo Brcko (BIH)	5	2016/2017	-	8	8	0	8	5	24	-19
140	Örebro VBS (SWE)	1	1999/2000	-	7	4	3	1	9	4	+5
-	Ionikos Athens (GRE)	1	1994/1995	-	7	4	3	1	9	4	+5
142	Královo Pole Brno (CZE)	1	1990/1991	-	7	4	3	1	9	7	+2
143	Español de Barcelona (SPA)	1	1991/1992	-	7	5	2	3	10	9	+1
144	CSM Bucuresti (ROM)	1	2018/2019	-	7	6	1	5	7	16	-9
145	Kimikis Daugavpils (LAT)	2	1994/1995	-	7	6	1	5	6	15	-9
146	Robur Tiboni Urbino (ITA)	1	2012/2013	-	7	6	1	5	6	16	-10
147	Filathlitikos (GRE)	1	2000/2001	-	7	6	1	5	4	15	-11
148	Békéscsabai RSE (HUN)	3	2016/2017	-	7	6	1	5	4	17	-13
149	Koll (NOR)	3	1991/1992	-	7	6	1	5	3	17	-14
150	Cuesta Piedra Santa Cruz (SPA)	1	1992/1993	-	6	4	2	2	6	6	0
151	Kohila VK (EST)	1	2016/2017	-	6	4	2	2	8	9	-1
152	Tormo Barberá Xàtiva (SPA)	1	1990/1991	-	6	4	2	2	7	8	-1
153	Teuta Durrës (ALB)	1	1999/2000	-	6	4	2	2	6	7	-1
154	Fortuna Odense (DEN)	1	1992/1993	-	6	4	2	2	6	8	-2
155	Partizani Tirana (ALB)	1	2019/2020	-	6	4	2	2	6	9	-3
156	Saint-Raphaël (FRA)	1	2016/2017	-	6	6	0	6	2	18	-16
-	Aguere Tenerife (SPA)	1	2010/2011	-	6	6	0	6	2	18	-16
-	OK Kastela (CRO)	1	2001/2002	-	6	6	0	6	2	18	-16
159	ZOK Split 1700 (CRO)	1	2010/2011	-	6	6	0	6	1	18	-17
-	OK & FCL Lukavac (BIH)	3	1996/1997	-	6	6	0	6	1	18	-17
161	VDK Gent Dames (BEL)	1	2013/2014	-	6	6	0	6	0	18	-18
-	Skra Warszawa (POL)	1	2002/2003	-	6	6	0	6	0	18	-18
163	Opponent A ()	1	1993/1994	-	5	4	1	3	7	9	-2
164	Hakiryatim Kiryat Haïm (ISR)	2	1996/1997	-	5	4	1	3	3	9	-6
165	Makedonija Strumica (MKD)	2	1994/1995	-	5	4	1	3	3	10	-7
166	Volley Köniz (SWI)	1	2003/2004	-	4	4	0	4	3	12	-9
-	Luka Bar (MNE)	2	2016/2017	-	4	4	0	4	3	12	-9
168	Hapoel Kfar Saba (ISR)	2	2017/2018	-	4	4	0	4	1	12	-11
169	Klepp VBL (NOR)	2	1998/1999	-	4	4	0	4	0	12	-12
170	Yenisei Krasnoyarsk (RUS)	1	2017/2018	-	3	2	1	1	5	5	0
-	SC Berlin (GER)	1	1990/1991	-	3	2	1	1	5	5	0
172	Luka Koper (SLO)	1	1997/1998	-	3	2	1	1	3	4	-1
173	Hesa Helsinki (FIN)	1	1990/1991	-	3	2	1	1	3	5	-2
-	Brixton Knights VC London (ENG)	1	1990/1991	-	3	2	1	1	3	5	-2
175	VBC Montana Luzern (SWI)	1	1990/1991	-	2	2	0	2	3	6	-3
176	OrPo Orivesi (FIN)	1	1997/1998	-	2	2	0	2	1	6	-5
-	Maccabi XT Haifa (ISR)	1	2016/2017	-	2	2	0	2	1	6	-5
-	Volco Ommen (NED)	1	1994/1995	-	2	2	0	2	1	6	-5
-	SC Prometey Kamyanske (UKR)	2	2020/2021	-	2	2	0	2	1	6	-5
-	Klimacommerce Bled (SLO)	1	1995/1996	-	2	2	0	2	1	6	-5
181	Tent Obrenovac (SCG)	1	2020/2021	-	2	2	0	2	0	6	-6
-	Imzit Dobrinja Sarajevo (BIH)	1	1998/1999	-	2	2	0	2	0	6	-6
-	PSvBG Salzburg (AUT)	1	1993/1994	-	2	2	0	2	0	6	-6
-	UVC Graz (AUT)	1	2018/2019	-	2	2	0	2	0	6	-6
-	OK Celje (SLO)	1	1994/1995	-	2	2	0	2	0	6	-6
-	KV Drita Gjilan (KOS)	1	2016/2017	-	2	2	0	2	0	6	-6
-	Hapoel Bat Yam (ISR)	1	1991/1992	-	2	2	0	2	0	6	-6
-	Tre Penne San Marino (RSM)	1	1999/2000	-	2	2	0	2	0	6	-6
-	OK Breza 1934 (BIH)	1	1995/1996	-	2	2	0	2	0	6	-6
-	ZOK Jedinstvo Tuzla (BIH)	1	1994/1995	-	2	2	0	2	0	6	-6
-	SK Lushnja (ALB)	1	1993/1994	-	2	2	0	2	0	6	-6
-	Aurora Riga (LAT)	1	1993/1994	-	2	2	0	2	0	6	-6
-	Oazis Jrarat (ARM)	1	1992/1993	-	2	2	0	2	0	6	-6
-	Powerhouse Glasgow (SCO)	1	1992/1993	-	2	2	0	2	0	6	-6

== See also ==
- Men's
  - CEV Champions League
  - CEV Challenge Cup
  - CEV Cup
  - FIVB Volleyball Men's Club World Championship
- Women's
  - CEV Women's Champions League
  - CEV Women's Challenge Cup
  - CEV Cup Women's
  - FIVB Volleyball Women's Club World Championship
