= Victoria Ravva =

Georgian-born French volleyball player

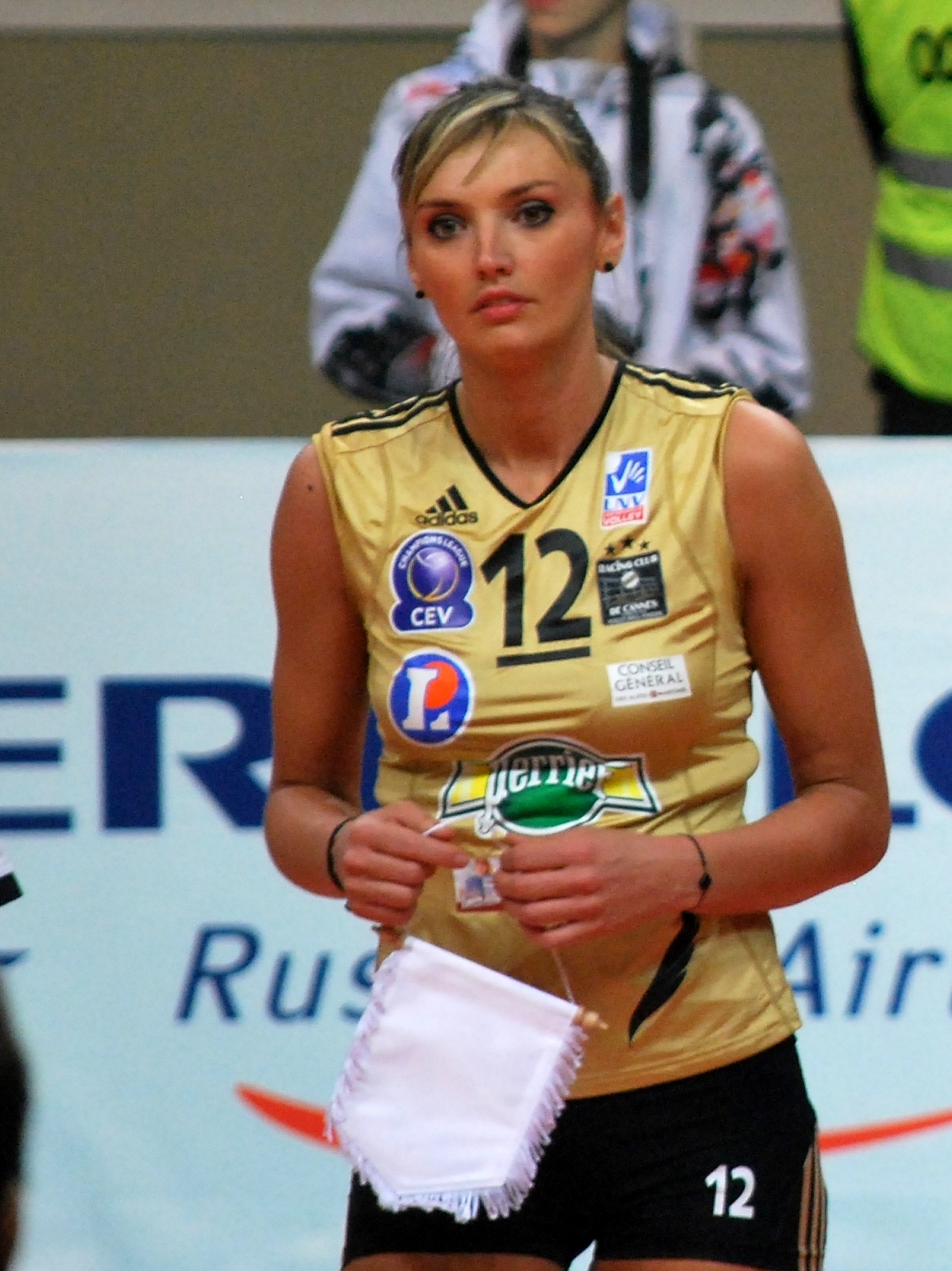
- Ravva playing for RC Cannes in 2011

Personal information
- Full name: Victoria Ravva
- Nickname: Vicky
- Nationality: Georgia; Azerbaijan; France (since 2002)
- Born: October 31, 1975 (age 51) Tbilisi, Georgia
- Home town: Tbilisi, Georgia
- Height: 1.93 m (6 ft 4 in)
- Weight: 75 kg (165 lb)
- Spike: 314 cm (124 in)
- Block: 302 cm (119 in)

Volleyball information
- Position: Middle Blocker

Career
- Years: Team
- 1989–1993 1993–1995 1995–2015: BZBK Baku; Ankara Vakifbank; RC Cannes

National team
- Years: Team
- 1994 2004-2007: Azerbaijan; France

Victoria Ravva (born October 31, 1975) is a Georgian-born volleyball player who represented both Azerbaijan and France in international volleyball. She spent the most of her career in RC Cannes.

Ravva was born in Tbilisi. She started her career in BZBK Baku (1989–1993) and Ankara Vakifbank (1994–1995). She is married to Georgian volleyball player Alexandre Jioshvili. In the 2010 season she was the best blocker of Women's CEV Champions League.

== Clubs ==
- (Azerbaijan) BZBK Baku (1989–1993)
- (Turkey) Vakifbank (1993–1995)
- (France) RC Cannes (1995–2015)

== Titles ==
- Women's CEV Champions League (2): 2002, 2003.
- French Women's Volleyball League (19): 1996, 1998, 1999, 2000, 2001, 2002, 2003, 2004, 2005, 2006, 2007, 2008, 2009, 2010, 2011, 2012, 2013, 2014, 2015
- French Cup (18): 1996, 1997, 1998, 1999, 2000, 2001, 2003, 2004, 2005, 2006, 2007, 2008, 2009, 2010, 2011, 2012, 2013, 2014
- Turkish Cup (1): 1995

== Individual awards ==
- 1998-99 French League "Best Scorer"
- 1999-2000 French League "Best Scorer"
- 2001–02 CEV Champions League "Most Valuable Player"
- 2001–02 CEV Champions League "Best Scorer"
- 2001–02 CEV Champions League "Best Blocker"
- 2002–03 CEV Champions League "Best Blocker"
- 2002–03 CEV Champions League "Most Valuable Player"
- 2005–06 CEV Champions League "Most Valuable Player"
- 2005–06 CEV Champions League "Best Blocker"
- 2005–06 CEV Champions League "Best Scorer"
- 2008-09 French League "Best Blocker"
- 2009-10 French League "Best Blocker"
- 2010-11 French League "Best Blocker"
- 2011-12 French League "Best Blocker"
