= Laurianne Delabarre =

French volleyball player (born 1987)

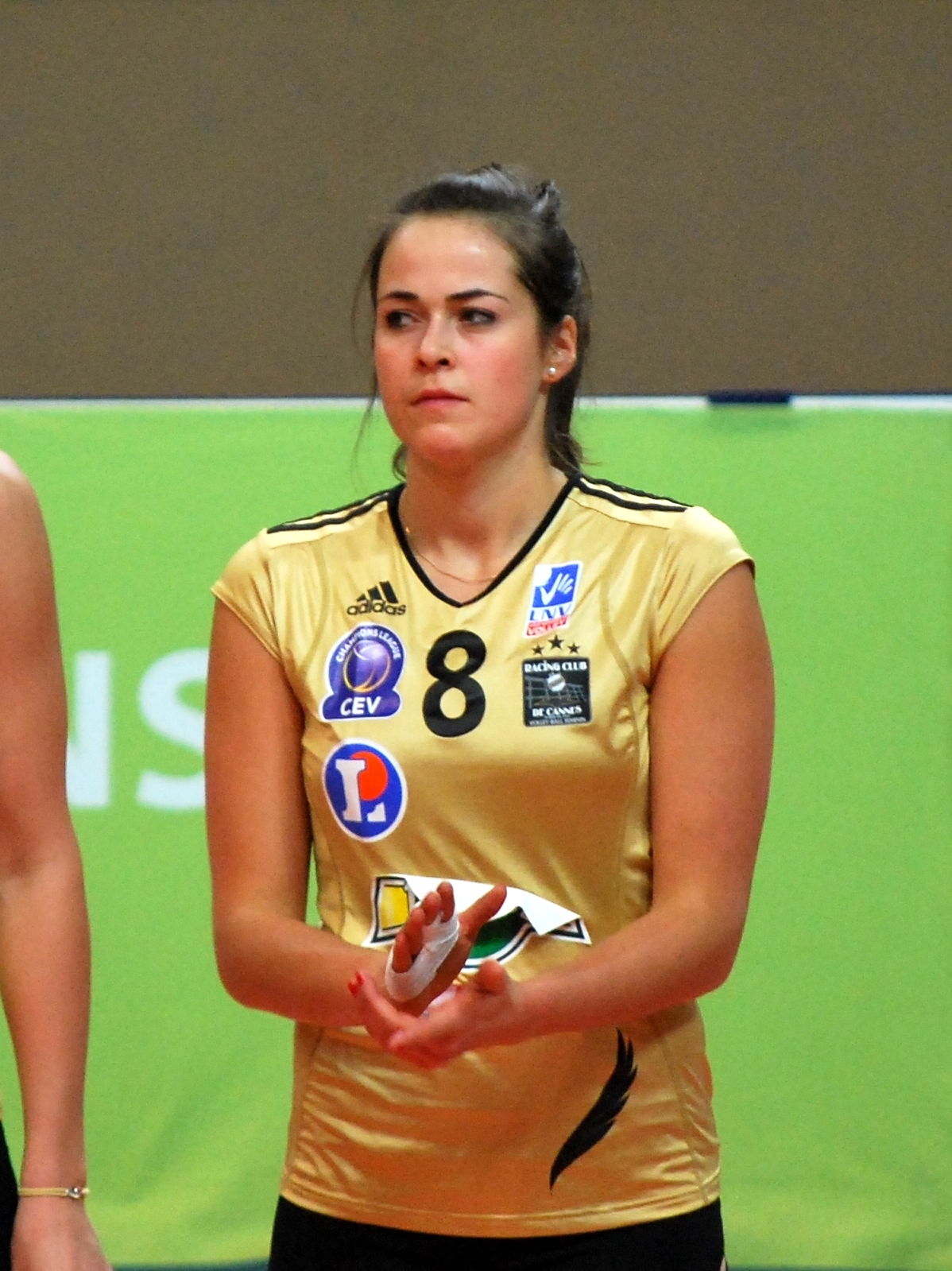

Personal information
- Nationality: French
- Born: 24 April 1987 (age 39)

Volleyball information
- Position: setter
- Number: 6 (national team)

Career
Years	Teams
2009	(France) La Rochette Volley

National team
2009	France

Laurianne Delabarre (born 24 April 1987) is a French female volleyball player, playing as a setter. She was part of the France women's national volleyball team.

She competed at the 2009 Mediterranean Games. On club level she played for La Rochette Volley in 2009. She participated in the 2011 Women's European Volleyball Championship.
