= 1960–61 Volleyball Women's European Cup =

The 1960–61 Volleyball Women's European Cup was the inaugural edition of the European premier championship for women's volleyball clubs. Dynamo Moscow defeated AZS-AWF Warszawa in a two-leg final on April 27 and June 8, 1961, to become the first champion of the competition.

== Preliminary round ==
Team #1	Agg.	Team #2	1st	2nd
SC Rotation Leipzig (East Germany)	6–0	(Austria) Olympia Wien	3–0	3–0
Stade France	6–0	(Portugal) Sporting Espinho	3–0	3–0
Partizan Belgrade (Socialist Federal Republic of Yugoslavia)	6–0	(Morocco) TS Casablanca	3–0	3–0
Dinamo Bucharest (Romania)	6–0	(Turkey) Fenerbahçe	3–0	3–0

== Quarter-finals ==
Team #1	Agg.	Team #2	1st	2nd
AZS-AWF Warszawa (Poland)	6–3	(East Germany) Rotation Leipzig	3–1	3–2
Slavoj Plzeň MP (Czech Republic)	6–1	Stade France	3–0	3–1
Dynamo Moscow (Soviet Union)	6–1	(Bulgaria) Minyor Dimitrovo	3–0	3–1
Partizan Belgrade (Socialist Federal Republic of Yugoslavia)	3–4	(Romania) Dinamo Bucharest	3–1	0–3

== Semifinals ==
Team #1	Agg.	Team #2	1st	2nd
AZS-AWF Warszawa (Poland)	6–1	(Czech Republic) Slavoj Plzeň MP	3–0	3–1
Dynamo Moscow (Soviet Union)	6–2	(Romania) Dinamo Bucharest	3–0	3–2

== Final ==
Team #1	Agg.	Team #2	1st	2nd
AZS-AWF Warszawa (Poland)	2–6	(Soviet Union) Dynamo Moscow	2–3	0–3
