= RC Cannes =

Volleyball team in France

- Full name: Racing Club de Cannes
- Founded: 1922
- Ground: Palais des Victoires, Cannes, France (Capacity: 4,000)
- Chairman: Agostino Pesce
- Head coach: Riccardo Marchesi
- League: Ligue A
- 2022–23: 7th
- Website: Club home page

Uniforms
Home	Away

RC Cannes is a French women's volleyball club based in Cannes and playing in the Ligue AF.

== History ==
Racing Club de Cannes was created as a sports club in 1922 and the volleyball department was introduced in 1942. Originally it had both men and women's teams until 1948 when the men's team was dissolved. The club played in regional and lower national leagues and when the national league was restructured in 1967, it gained a place in the elite league. The club proved to be competitive and after finishing second in 1972, it qualified for the first time to play in a European competition (Cup Winners Cup). In 1993, Chinese coach Yan Fang was hired and the club became very successful. For the next 23 seasons (from 1993–94 to 2015–16) under his coaching, the club won twenty French Championships (including eighteen consecutive titles from 1997–98 to 2014–15 and finish second in 1993–94, 1996–97 and 2015–16), nineteen French Cups (finish second in 1993–94, 1994–95, 2001–02 and 2014–15), two CEV Women's Champions League (in 2001–02 and 2002–03, finishing second in 2005–06 and 2011–12). The club has also won minor international tournaments, such as the Women's Top Volley International on six occasions (December 1993, 1995, 1999, 2002, 2005 and 2012).

== Venue ==
In 2005 the club moved from the Palais des Sports André Henry to the Palais des Victoires.

== Honours ==
=== National competitions ===
- French Championship: 21

1994–95, 1995–96, 1997–98, 1998–99, 1999–00, 2000–01, 2001–02, 2002–03, 2003–04, 2004–05, 2005–06, 2006–07, 2007–08, 2008–09, 2009–10, 2010–11, 2011–12, 2012–13, 2013–14, 2014–15, 2018-19

- French Cup: 20

1995–96, 1996–97, 1997–98, 1998–99, 1999–00, 2000–01, 2002–03, 2003–04, 2004–05, 2005–06, 2006–07, 2007–08, 2008–09, 2009–10, 2010–11, 2011–12, 2012–13, 2013–14, 2015–16, 2017-18

=== International competitions ===
- CEV Champions League: 2

2001–02, 2002–03

== Team ==
Season 2016–2017, as of March 2017.

Number	Player	Position	Height (m)	Weight (kg)	Birth date
1	(France) Myriam Kloster	Middle blocker	1.88	76	4 August 1989 (age 35)
2	(Ukraine) Olga Savenchuk	Opposite	1.88	78	20 May 1988 (age 37)
3	(France) Lucille Gicquel	Outside hitter	1.89	71	13 November 1997 (age 27)
4	(Brazil) Mariana Thomaz de Aquino	Middle blocker	1.92	70	2 May 1991 (age 34)
5	(United States) Taylor Sandbothe	Middle blocker	1.87	68	15 December 1994 (age 30)
6	(France) Déborah Ortschitt	Libero	1.65	58	10 June 1987 (age 38)
7	(Serbia) Sanja Bursać	Outside hitter	1.78	63	10 January 1990 (age 35)
10	(Croatia) Vedrana Jakšetić	Setter	1.83	73	17 September 1996 (age 28)
11	(Serbia) Tanja Grbić	Setter	1.76	64	9 July 1988 (age 37)
15	(Slovenia) Sara Hutinski	Middle blocker	1.86	71	20 June 1991 (age 34)
16	(Ukraine) Nadiia Kodola	Outside hitter	1.85	78	29 September 1988 (age 36)
17	(Bulgaria) Gergana Dimitrova	Outside hitter	1.84	74	28 February 1996 (age 29)
18	(Japan) Kotoki Zayasu	Libero	1.59	56	11 January 1990 (age 35)
19	(France) Romane Ruiz	Libero	1.78	67	5 January 1997 (age 28)
20	(France) Carla Boudal	Libero	1.67	62	14 July 1999 (age 26)

2010–2011 Team
Number	Player	Position	Height (m)	Weight (kg)	Birth date
1	(Germany) Hanka Pachale	Outside hitter	1.90		12 September 1976 (age 48)
2	(Serbia) Amadéa Duraković	Outside hitter	1.88		6 October 1988 (age 36)
3	(Italy) Paola Croce	Libero	1.67		6 March 1978 (age 47)
4	(Ukraine) Maryna Marchenko	Outside hitter	1.87		12 July 1985 (age 40)
5	(Italy) Alessandra Camarda	Libero	1.74		5 August 1988 (age 36)
7	(Serbia) Ana Antonijević	Setter	1.85		26 August 1987 (age 37)
8	(France) Laurianne Delabarre	Setter	1.76		24 April 1987 (age 38)
10	(France) Alexandra Fomina	Libero	1.73		4 May 1975 (age 50)
11	(France) Irina Polechtchouk	Middle blocker	1.86		1 August 1973 (age 51)
12	(Georgia (country)) Victoria Ravva	Middle blocker	1.89		31 October 1975 (age 49)
13	(Italy) Nadia Centoni	Opposite	1.85		19 June 1981 (age 44)
15	(Serbia) Anja Spasojević	Outside hitter	1.87		4 July 1983 (age 42)
16	(Serbia) Milena Rašić	Middle blocker	1.93		25 October 1990 (age 34)
17	(France) Jelena Lozančić	Middle blocker	1.86		26 March 1983 (age 42)

== Notable players ==
- (Poland) Malgorzata Glinka (2005–2006)
- (Italy) Simona Rinieri (2003–2004)
- (Italy) Nadia Centoni (2007–2014)
- (Italy) Valentina Fiorin (2008–2010)
- (Romania) Cristina Pîrv (2004–2005)
- (Romania) Luminiţa Trombiţaş (2009)
- (Bulgaria) Eva Yaneva (2005–2010)
- (Bulgaria) Strashimira Filipova (2006–2009)
- (Serbia) Jelena Nikolić (2004–2005)
- (Serbia) Milena Rašić (2010–2014)
- (Georgia (country)) Victoria Ravva (1994–2015)
- (China) Zhang Yuehong (2002–2003)
- (Japan) Yuko Sano (2004–2006)
- (Japan) Akiko Ino (2007–2009)
- (United States) Logan Tom (2014–2015)
