= Continental championship =

Continental championship may refer to:

- African Championship
- Asian Championship
- European Championship
- Oceania Championship
- Pan American Championship
  - North American Championship
  - South American Championship
  - AEW Continental Championship

== See also ==
- 2012 Continental Championships (disambiguation)
- Central American Championships (disambiguation)
- Continental football championships, association football
- Continental Youth Championship, Gaelic football, hurling, and camogie
- SCCA Continental Championship, auto racing series
- World championship
