= UEFA league =

The following are league-based football competitions run by UEFA:

- UEFA European Championship, a continental international team's championship played every four years
- UEFA Women's Championship, the women's equivalent of the UEFA European Championship
- UEFA Champions League, the premier men's club competition (formerly European Cup)
- UEFA Europa League, the secondary men's club competition (formerly UEFA Cup)
- UEFA Europa Conference League, the tertiary men's club competition
- UEFA Futsal Champions League, formerly the UEFA Futsal Cup
- UEFA Nations League, an international teams' biennial competition
- UEFA Women's Champions League, the main women's club competition (formerly UEFA Women's Cup)
- UEFA Youth League, a European club competition

== See also ==
- Euro league (disambiguation)
- European league (disambiguation)
- Continental League (disambiguation)
