= Central League (disambiguation) =

The Central League (Japanese: セントラル・リーグ, romanized: Sentoraru Rīgu) is one of the two baseball leagues constituting Nippon Professional Baseball in Japan.

Central League may also refer to:

== Association football (soccer) leagues ==
- Campeonato Regional Centro (1903–1940), Spain
- Central Junior League (Poland) (Polish: Centralna Liga Juniorów, CLJ)
- Iraq Central FA Premier League

=== Football leagues in the United Kingdom ===
- Central Football League, Scotland
- Central Junior Football League, Scotland
- Gwent Central League, Wales

==== English football leagues ====
- Central League (England)
- Central Alliance (1911–1985)
- Central Amateur League

=== Football leagues in New Zealand ===
- Central League (New Zealand)
- Central League 2 (New Zealand) (MCL2)
- Central Premier League, New Zealand
- Women's Central League (New Zealand)

== Baseball leagues ==
- Central League (1888)
- Central League (1897)
- Central League (1900), ceased 1951
- Central Baseball League (1994–2005)
- Central Illinois Collegiate League (1963–2008)
- Central International League (1912)
- Central Interstate League (1888–1890)
- Great Central League (c. 1994)
- High-A Central, the 2021 name of the Midwest League, founded in 1947
- Mexican Central League (1960–1978)
- South Central League (1906, 1912)
- Central Association (1908–1917, 1947–1949)

== High school athletic conferences ==
- Central Athletic League, suburban Philadelphia
- Central Suburban League, the North Shore suburbs of Chicago
- SouthWest Central League (SWCL), southwest Missouri
- Catholic Central League (CCL), District 6 of the Massachusetts Interscholastic Athletic Association

== Other sports ==
- National Central League, a subdivision of the Southern California Football Association
- Central Hockey League (disambiguation)
- Central League (Polish men's handball) (Polish: Liga Centralna)
- Central Basketball League (disbanded 1912), based in Ohio and Pennsylvania

== Other uses ==
- Central Animal Liberation League (CALL), an animal rights organisation based in central England
- Central Sikh League (CSL; 1919–1933), an Indian political party

== See also ==
- Central (disambiguation)
- League (disambiguation)
- CIF Central Section: California Interscholastic Federation—Central Section (CIF-CS)
