= European Super League (disambiguation) =

The European Super League was a proposed annual club football competition founded in 2021.

European Super League may also refer to:

== Sports ==
- Super League the top division of the British and European rugby league system since 1996.
- Proposals for a European Super League in association football, a proposed league involving Europe's leading association football teams
- Eastern European Super League, an international American football tournament involving the best clubs from Russia and Belarus
- European Athletics Team Championships Super League, the top European team athletics league
  - European Cup Super League, the precursor to the Team Championships top league

== Entertainment ==
- European Superleague, an association football management video game released in 1990
- European Super League, an association football management video game released in 2001

== See also ==
- ESL (disambiguation)
- Euro league (disambiguation)
- European league (disambiguation)
- Super League (disambiguation)
- European Football League, an American football league in Europe
- Football Superleague of Kosovo, the top level of the Kosovar association football league system
