= Super Hockey League =

Super Hockey League, or Hockey Superleague or variation may refer to:

a "superleague" (ie. "elite league"):

Ice hockey

- Ice hockey league at the pro-elite majors level
- Russian Superleague
- Ice Hockey Superleague, Britain
- Turkish Ice Hockey Super League
- East Coast Super League, NSW, Australia
- Super East Collegiate Hockey League, New England, USA; amateur varsity collegiate
- J20 SuperElit, Sweden, juniors
- EWHL Super Cup, women's Europe
- IIHF Super Cup, men's Europe

Field hockey

- Field hockey league at the pro-elite majors level

== See also ==
- Super League (disambiguation)
- Elite League (disambiguation)
- Pakistan Super Hockey League
- Super Ice Hockey
- Super Hockey
- super cup
