= Superbowl (disambiguation) =

The Super Bowl is the annual league championship game of the National Football League of the United States.

Superbowl or Super Bowl may also refer to:

- Superbowl of Debate is a program by the University of Louisville Debate Society to increase minority participation in debate
- Superbowl of Wrestling held in the 1970s
- Super Bowl of Poker held in the 1980s
- The championship game of the Italian Football League was known as the Superbowl italiano until 2014
- A performance venue at the Sun City resort located in South Africa
- The Super Dave Superbowl of Knowledge, a 1994 TV special by Super Dave Osborne
- "Super Bowl," a 2003 episode of Aqua Teen Hunger Force
- "Super Bowl" (song), a 2023 song by Stray Kids

== See also ==
- super cup
- Super League (disambiguation)
