= Electrochemical and Solid-State Letters =

- Language: English

Publication details
- History: 1998-2012
- Publisher: Electrochemical Society
- Impact factor: 2.321 (2014)

Standard abbreviations
- ISO 4: Electrochem. Solid-State Lett.

Indexing
- CODEN: ESLEF6
- ISSN: 1099-0062

Links
- Journal homepage

Electrochemical and Solid-State Letters (ESL) was a peer-reviewed scientific journal that began publication in 1998 as a joint publication of the Electrochemical Society and the IEEE Electron Devices Society. The final issue was published in 2012. The journal is now preserved as an archive, and has been replaced by ECS Electrochemistry Letters and ECS Solid State Letters.

== Abstracting and indexing ==
The journal was abstracted and indexed in:

Chemical Abstracts

According to the Journal Citation Reports, the journal has a 2013 impact factor of 2.149, ranking it 12th out of 27 journals in the category "Electrochemistry" and 70th out of 251 journals in the category "Materials Science, Multidisciplinary".

== History ==
The Society's rapid-publication online journal, Electrochemical and Solid-State Letters, was introduced in 1998. It was the first journal in the fields covered by ECS to use a system of publishing papers online first, one article at a time, as soon as they have been accepted and prepared for publication, with paper publication to follow.
