= Elite League =

Elite League may refer to:

- Elite League (speedway), British motorcycle speedway competition
- Under 20 Elite League, an international association football tournament introduced in 2017.
- French Rugby League Elite One Championship and Elite Two Championship
- Elite Ice Hockey League, the highest level of ice hockey competition in the United Kingdom
- Eliteserien (disambiguation), the name of the top-tier league in many sports in Norway
- Elitserien (disambiguation), the name of the top-tier league in many sports in Sweden
  - Swedish Hockey League, the highest level ice hockey league in Sweden, called Elitserien 1975–2013, known in English as the Swedish Elite League
- Sahara Elite League, Kenyan cricket competition
- Elite League (India), Indian Under-18 association football league
- Elite League (TV series), South Korean TV series aired on Maeil Broadcasting Network and Coupang Play in 2023

== See also ==
- Super League (disambiguation)
- League (disambiguation)
