= 2014–15 Superliga =

2014–15 Superliga may refer to:

- 2014–15 Romanian Superliga (women's football)
- 2014–15 Superliga de Voleibol Masculina, Spain
- 2014–15 Superliga Femenina de Voleibol, Spain

== See also ==
- Superliga (disambiguation)
