= 2013–14 Superliga =

2013–14 Superliga may refer to:

- 2013–14 Danish Superliga
- 2013–14 Romanian Superliga (women's football)
- 2013–14 Superliga de Voleibol Masculina, Spain
- 2013–14 Superliga Femenina de Voleibol, Spain

== See also ==
- Superliga (disambiguation)
