= Super League 2012 =

The name Super League 2012 may refer to the sporting events:

- Super League XVII in rugby league, in England and France
- 2012 WABA Super League in basketball in West Asia
- 2012 Chinese Super League in football (soccer)
- 2012 Malaysia Super League in football
- 2012 Vietnamese Super League in football

== See also ==
- Super League (disambiguation)
