= CHL =

CHL may refer to:

== Ice hockey ==
=== Current leagues ===
- Canadian Hockey League (1975–present), the umbrella organization for Canadian major junior hockey
- Champions Hockey League (2014–present), a European ice hockey tournament
- Continental Hockey League (2007–present), an international professional ice hockey league comprising teams from Russia and Europe, usually abbreviated as KHL
- Central Hockey League, now the Central Canada Hockey League (1961–present), a Junior A ice hockey league

=== Defunct leagues ===
- Central Hockey League (1925–1926), a Senior Amateur ice league hockey that operated in the United States and Canada
- Central Hockey League (1931–1935), a minor professional ice hockey league that operated in the United States
- Central Hockey League (1963–1984), a minor professional ice hockey league that operated in the United States
- Central Hockey League (1992–2014), a minor professional ice hockey league that operated in the United States and Canada prior to merging with the ECHL
- Champions Hockey League (2008–09), a short-lived ice hockey tournament
- Coloured Hockey League (1894–1930), an all-black ice hockey league that operated in Nova Scotia
- Colonial Hockey League (1991–1997), a minor professional ice hockey league in the United States and Canada, became United Hockey League

== Science and technology ==
- Chain Home Low, a radar system used by the British Royal Air Force during World War II
- Chlorite, a group of phyllosilicate minerals
- Chlorophyll, a pigment used by nearly all plants to absorb light for photosynthesis
- Classic Hodgkin's lymphoma, cancer originating from white blood cells
- Conductive hearing loss, a hearing disorder where there is a problem conducting sound waves through parts of the ear
- Computational system for human language (C_{HL}), a concept proposed by Noam Chomsky under his Minimalist program

== Organisations ==
- Centre Hospitalier de Luxembourg, the public-sector healthcare provider in Luxembourg City
- China Mobile (New York Stock Exchange symbol, and on American Depository Receipts)

== Other uses ==
- California Historical Landmark, a designation for historic sites in California, US
- Chile (ISO 3166-1 3-letter country code CHL), a country in South America
- Church History Library, a research center and archives building in Salt Lake City operated by the LDS Church
- Clifton Hill railway station, Melbourne
- Concealed Handgun License, a legal authorization to carry concealed handguns used in some US states
- County Hall, London, in the United Kingdom

== See also ==
- Canadian Hockey League (disambiguation)
- Central Hockey League (disambiguation)
- Continental Hockey League (disambiguation)
