= Canadian Hockey Association =

Canadian Hockey Association may refer to:

- Canadian Hockey Association (1909–10), a men's professional ice hockey league
- Canadian Hockey Association (1968–1970), a governing body for junior ice hockey in Canada
- Hockey Canada or the Canadian Hockey Association, the governing body for ice hockey in Canada

== See also ==
- Amateur Hockey Association of Canada (1886–1898)
- Canadian Amateur Hockey Association (1914–1994)
- Canadian Hockey League (disambiguation)
