= Super League (disambiguation) =

The Super League is the first tier of the British rugby league system.

Super League may also refer to:

== Athletics ==
- Super League, the winners of the European Cup athletics competition

== Association football ==
- Argentine Primera División, former name of the Argentine Superliga
- Belgian Women's Super League (Super League Vrouwenvoetbal)
- Chinese Super League
- Danish Superliga
- European Super League
- England's FA Women's Super League (aka FA WSL)
- Football Superleague of Kosovo
- Indian Super League
- Super League (Indonesia)
- Iraq Super League
- Kazakhstan Super League
- Malaysia Super League
- Nepal Super League
- New Caledonian Super League
- North American SuperLiga
- Northern Super League
- Serbian SuperLiga
- South Australian Super League
- Super League of Belize
- Super League Greece
- Swiss Super League
- Super League of Malawi
- Turkish Süper Lig
- Ugandan Super League
- United States' USL Super League
- Uzbekistan Super League
- Zambia Super League

== Badminton ==
- China Badminton Super League

== Bandy ==
- Russian Bandy Super League

== Basketball ==
- Basketball Super League (North America)
- Irish Super League, the highest basketball league on the island of Ireland
- Israeli Basketball Super League, the highest professional league in Israel
- Russian Basketball Super League, since 2010–11 the second-tier professional league in Russia
- Turkish Basketball Super League, the highest professional league in Turkey
- Ukrainian Basketball SuperLeague, the highest professional league in Ukraine

== Cricket ==
- Global Super League
- ICC Cricket World Cup Super League
- Pakistan Super League
- Women's Cricket Super League
- Women's T20 Super League

== Cycling ==
- ProVelo Super League, a road racing series in Australia

== Floorball ==
- Swedish Super League (men's floorball)
- Swedish Super League (women's floorball)

== Handball ==
- Russian Handball Super League

== Ice hockey ==
- Ice Hockey Superleague, a defunct British competition
- Russian Superleague

== Kabaddi ==
- Super Kabaddi League, the professional kabaddi league in Pakistan

== Motorsport ==
- Superleague Formula, a football club themed racing series that operated from 2008 to 2011

== Netball ==
- Mobil Superleague, the highest league in Australian netball from 1985 to 1996
- Netball Superleague, the highest league in British netball
- Netball Super League (Malaysia), the highest league in Malaysian netball
- Netball Super League (Singapore), the highest league in Singaporean netball
- Suncorp Super Netball or Super Netball League, the current highest league in Australian netball

== Rugby league ==
- RFL Women's Super League, the equivalent women's competition
- RFL Women's Super League South, an expansion league for southern rugby league clubs (2021 to 2023)
- RFL Wheelchair Super League, the top division of British wheelchair rugby league
- Super League (Australia), a competitor league to what is now the National Rugby League
- Super League International Board, defunct international governing body for Super League-aligned nations

== Rugby union ==
- Rugby Canada Super League
- Rugby Super League (United States) (defunct)
- Súper Liga Americana de Rugby

== Table tennis ==
- China Table Tennis Super League

== Triathlon ==
- Super League Triathlon

== Volleyball ==
- Brazilian Men's Volleyball Super League
- Brazilian Women's Volleyball Super League
- Russian Volleyball Super League

== Other uses ==
- European Super League (disambiguation)
- Super League, a 1987 Sega arcade baseball video game, predecessor of Tommy Lasorda Baseball (1989)

== See also ==
- Super Cup
- Super Hockey League
- Elite League (disambiguation)
- Superliga (disambiguation)
- Super Ligue (disambiguation)
- League (disambiguation)
