= Continental League (disambiguation) =

The Continental League was a proposed major league in American baseball that was announced in 1959 and disbanded in 1960.

Continental League may also refer to:

- Continental Club Rugby League, a planned annual European rugby union competition
- Continental Baseball League, which operated 2007–2010 in the United States
- Continental Football League, which operated 1965–1969 in the United States
- Continental Hockey League (disambiguation)
- Continental Indoor Football League, which operated 2006–2014 in the United States
- Continental Indoor Soccer League, which operated 1993–1997 in the United States and Mexico
- League of Legends Continental League, a video game league that operated 2016–2022

== See also ==
- Continental Basketball Association, which operated 1946–2009 in the United States
