= Chinese Badminton Association =

Non-profit sports organisation in China

Chinese Badminton Association 中国羽毛球协会
- Abbreviation: CBA
- Formation: 11 September 1958
- Headquarters: Beijing, China
- Region served: China
- Official language: Chinese
- Chairman: Zhang Xin
- Parent organization: State General Administration of Sports
- Affiliations: BAC, BWF
- Website: www.cba.org.cn (in Chinese)

Chinese Badminton Association (Chinese: 中国羽毛球协会) is a national non-governmental, non-profit sports organisation in China. It represents China in the Badminton World Federation (BWF) and the Badminton Asia Confederation (BAC) as well as the sport of badminton in the All-China Sports Federation.

== History ==
The precursor of Chinese Badminton Association was the Guangzhou Badminton Association, which was established as acting association to host the visiting Indonesian badminton team. Later in September 1958, the Chinese Badminton Association was formally created in Wuhan with Liang Guangfu as its first president.

== Tournaments ==
- China Open, an annual open tournament that attracts the world's elite players.
- China Masters, annual open tournament started in 2005.
- Lingshui China Masters, an open tournament held in Lingshui, Hainan.
- Chinese National Badminton Championships
- China Badminton Super League
