= Canadian Major Junior Hockey League =

The Canadian Major Junior Hockey League (CMJHL) is the original name of two organizations:

- The Western Hockey League was known as the CMJHL in its inaugural season of 1966–67 before changing its name to the Western Canada Hockey League
- The Canadian Hockey League was originally called the CMJHL upon its founding in 1975 before shortening its name some time later

== See also ==
- Canadian Junior Hockey League
- Canadian Hockey League (disambiguation)
