= Super Ligue =

Super Ligue may refer to:

- New Caledonia Super Ligue, football league in New Caledonia, France
- Super Ligue (Niger), football league in Niger

== See also ==
- Super League (disambiguation)
