= Canadian Hockey League (disambiguation) =

The Canadian Hockey League is a major junior ice hockey league

Canadian Hockey League or Canada Hockey League or Hockey League of Canada may also refer to:

- Canadian Junior Hockey League, the junior A ice hockey league
- Canadian Amateur Hockey League (1898) early ice hockey league
- Canadian Elite Hockey League (2005) semi-pro ice hockey league
- Canadian–American Hockey League (1926) pro ice hockey league
- Western Canada Hockey League (1923) AAA pro ice hockey league

== See also ==
- CHL (disambiguation)
- Canadian Major Junior Hockey League (disambiguation)
- Canadian Hockey Association (disambiguation)
- Canadian Amateur Hockey Association, predecessor organization to the CHL
- Central Canada Hockey League, junior A ice hockey league
