= ECS Electrochemistry Letters =

- Discipline: Electrochemistry
- Language: English
- Edited by: Robert Savinell, Gerald S. Frankel, Thomas F. Fuller, Charles L. Hussey, Shelley D. Minteer, Rangachary Mukundan, Dennis G. Peters, John Weidner, Martin Winter

Publication details
- History: 2012-2015
- Publisher: Electrochemical Society (United States)
- Frequency: Monthly
- Impact factor: 1.789 (2014)

Standard abbreviations
- ISO 4: ECS Electrochem. Lett.

Indexing
- CODEN: EELCBY
- ISSN: 2162-8726 (print); 2162-8734 (web)
- LCCN: 2011203045
- OCLC no.: 746495709

Links
- Journal homepage; Online access; Online archive

ECS Electrochemistry Letters (EEL) is a monthly peer-reviewed scientific journal covering electrochemical science and technology. It was established in 2012 and is published by the Electrochemical Society. EEL ceased publication at the end of 2015. The editors-in-chief were Robert Savinell (Case Western Reserve University), Gerald S. Frankel (Ohio State University), Thomas F. Fuller (Georgia Tech), Charles L. Hussey (University of Mississippi), Shelley D. Minteer (University of Utah), Rangachary Mukundan (Los Alamos National Laboratory), Dennis G. Peters (Indiana University), John Weidner (University of South Carolina), and Martin Winter (University of Münster). According to the Journal Citation Reports, the journal has a 2014 impact factor of 1.789.
