= ESL (disambiguation) =

ESL is English as a second language, the use of English by speakers with different native languages.

ESL or esl may also refer to:

== Languages ==
- Egyptian Sign Language (ISO 639-3 code: esl)
- Estonian Sign Language

== Organizations ==
- Stobart (logistics company), formerly Eddie Stobart Logistics, British logistics company
- ESL Federal Credit Union, an American credit union
- ESL Incorporated, a defunct American technology company
- ESL Investments, an American hedge fund
- ESL Music, an American record label
- ESL (company), a German company which organizes esports leagues worldwide
- Ethnological Society of London, a defunct learned society

== Places ==
- East St. Louis, Illinois, a city in the US
- Eastleigh railway station (station code), in England
- Elista Airport (IATA code), in Russia
- ESL Sports Centre, now the Bill Gray's Regional Iceplex, in Rochester, New York, US

== Sport ==
- Eastern Soccer League, a defunct American soccer league
- Super League, known as the European Super League and the English Super League, both shortened to ESL
- European Super League, a 2021 proposed European club football competition

== Science and technology ==
- East Siberian Laika, a breed of dog
- Electron-stimulated luminescence
- Electronic shelf label
- Electronic system-level
- Electrostatic loudspeaker
- Eslicarbazepine acetate, a drug
- Equivalent series inductance

== Other uses ==
- E.S.L. (band), a Canadian folk pop band
- Electrochemical and Solid-State Letters, a defunct scholarly journal
- Environmentally Sensitive Lands, in Florida, US
- Extended shelf life, in food retail
- PSA ES/L engine, an automotive engine

== See also ==
- European School, Luxembourg I (ESL1), an international school
  - European School, Luxembourg II (ESL2), an international school
- Entertainment and Sports Law Society (ESLS), Northeastern University School of Law, Boston, Massachusetts, USA
- Eastern Shores Library System (ESLS), Wisconsin, USA
