= ECS Solid State Letters =

- Discipline: Solid state chemistry
- Language: English
- Edited by: Dennis W. Hess

Publication details
- History: 2012-2015
- Publisher: Electrochemical Society
- Frequency: Monthly
- Impact factor: 1.162 (2014)

Standard abbreviations
- ISO 4: ECS Solid State Lett.

Indexing
- CODEN: ESSLCP
- ISSN: 2162-8742 (print); 2162-8750 (web)
- LCCN: 2011203043
- OCLC no.: 746495790

Links
- Journal homepage; Online access; Online archive

ECS Solid State Letters (SSL) is a peer-reviewed scientific journal covering the field of solid state science and technology. The journal was established in 2012 and is published by the Electrochemical Society. SSL ceased publication at the end of 2015. The editor-in-chief was Dennis W. Hess (Georgia Institute of Technology). According to the Journal Citation Reports, the journal has a 2014 impact factor of 1.162.
