= Super cup =

Curtain raiser in a sports competition

A super cup is a competition, in association football, basketball, handball, volleyball and rugby union which often forms the 'curtain raiser' to a season, and typically involves only two teams who have qualified through success in other competitions during the previous season.

It is typically contested on domestic level by two competition winners of the previous season: the national knock-out cup winner and the highest level league champion. There are also continental super cups, like the UEFA Super Cup in football, which puts together winners of the top and second-tier UEFA competitions and the Recopa Sudamericana between CONMEBOL Copa Libertadores and the Copa Sudamericana winners, and cross-border super cups between champions of neighbouring leagues, such as the Campeones Cup between the winners of the highest level leagues in the United States and Mexico, and the Champions Cup for the champions of both Northern Ireland and the Republic of Ireland.

The now-defunct Intercontinental Cup was a super cup played between the continental champions of Europe and South America, with winners retroactively recognised by world governing body FIFA as World Champions prior to the creation of the official FIFA Club World Cup and the CONMEBOL-UEFA Cup of Champions between the winners of the UEFA European Championship and the Copa América, which rebranded once again in 2022 after the 29-year hiatus.

Sometimes, these are two-legged ties, with a match played at each side's stadium, but increasingly they are one-off fixtures at a neutral venue, such as a national stadium. Some Super Cups have even been staged in venues outside their home country, such as the Italian, French, Spanish, Turkish, Mexican, and Egyptian games and increasingly function as publicity events for that league in the global market.

If the league champions are also the national cup winners, they may play a selected XI team, or more commonly the runners-up from one of the competitions, typically from the league.

The Finalissima between the national team continental champions of UEFA and CONMEBOL, also known as the CONMEBOL-UEFA Cup of Champions, plus its women's counterpart, are rare examples of 'super cups' between national sides.

The purpose of organizing the Super Cup is to declare the top team of the previous season (Super Champion).

== Football ==
=== National super cups ===
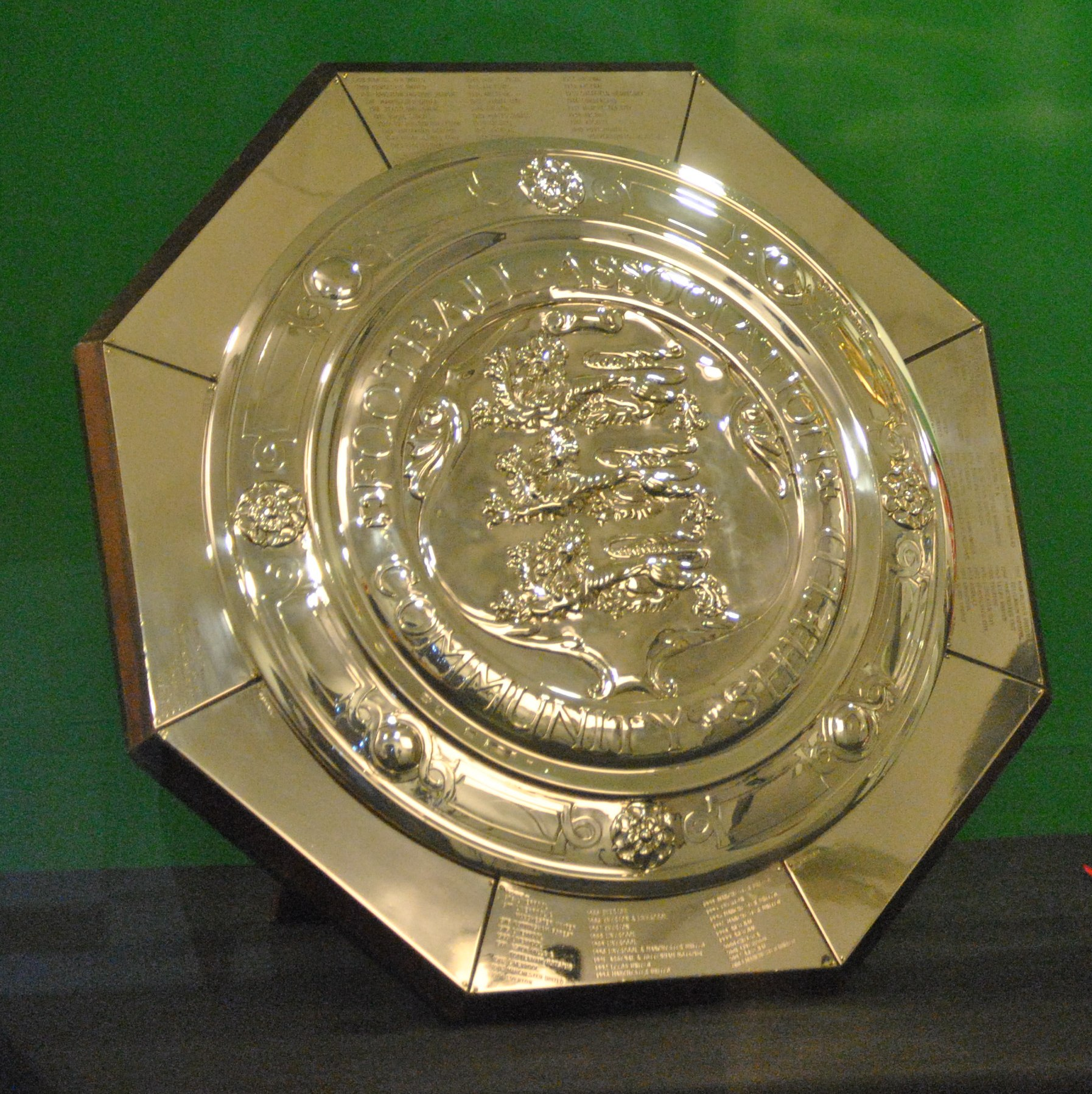
The FA Community Shield is contested by the winners of the Premier League and FA Cup

The following nations have an active super cup competition:

==== AFC ====
- (Bahrain) Bahraini Super Cup
- Bangladesh Challenge Cup
- Brunei Super Cup
- (Cambodia) Cambodian Super Cup
- (China) Chinese FA Super Cup
- (India) Indian Super Cup
- (Iran) Iranian Super Cup
- (Iraq) Iraqi Super Cup
- (Japan) Japanese Super Cup
- Jordan Super Cup
- Kyrgyzstan Super Cup
- Kuwait Super Cup
- (South Korea) Korean Super Cup
- (Lebanon) Lebanese Super Cup, Lebanese Women's Super Cup
- (Malaysia) Sultan Haji Ahmad Shah Cup
- (Maldives) Maldivian FA Charity Shield
- Mongolia Super Cup
- (Myanmar) MFF Charity Cup
- Oman Super Cup
- (Palestine) Gaza Strip Super Cup, West Bank Super Cup
- Qatari Sheikh Jassim Cup, Qatar Cup
- (Saudi Arabia) Saudi Super Cup
- Singapore Community Shield
- (Syria) Syrian Super Cup
- (Tajikistan) Tajik Supercup
- Thailand Champions Cup
- (Timor-Leste) LFA Super Taça
- Turkmenistan Super Cup
- Uzbekistan Super Cup
- (United Arab Emirates) UAE Super Cup
- (Vietnam) Vietnamese National Football Super Cup
- (Yemen) Yemeni Super Cup

==== CAF ====
- (Algeria) Algerian Super Cup
- (Ivory Coast) Coupe Houphouët-Boigny
- Djibouti Super Cup
- (Egypt) Egyptian Super Cup
- Ghana Super Cup, Ghana Women's Super Cup
- (Kenya) Kenyan Super Cup
- (Libya) Libyan Super Cup
- (Mauritania) Mauritanian Super Cup
- (Morocco) Moroccan Super Cup
- Namibia Super Cup
- Nigeria Women's Super Cup
- (Republic of the Congo) Super Coupe du Congo
- (Senegal) Senegalese Super Cup
- Somalia Super Cup
- Tanzania Community Shield
- (Tunisia) Tunisian Super Cup

==== CONCACAF ====
- Supercopa de Costa Rica
- (El Salvador) Salvadoran Supercup
- (Guatemala) Copa Campeón de Campeones
- (Honduras) Honduran Supercup
- (Mexico) Campeón de Campeones
- Suriname President's Cup
- Trinidad and Tobago Charity Shield
- (United States) NWSL Challenge Cup

==== CONMEBOL ====
- Supercopa Argentina
- (Argentina) Trofeo de Campeones de la Liga Profesional
- (Argentina) Supercopa Internacional
- (Brazil) Supercopa do Brasil
- Supercopa de Chile
- (Colombia) Superliga Colombiana
- Supercopa Ecuador
- Supercopa Paraguay
- (Peru) Supercopa Peruana
- (Uruguay) Supercopa Uruguaya
- Supercopa de Venezuela

==== OFC ====
- (Fiji) Champion versus Champion
- (New Zealand) Charity Cup
- (French Polynesia) Tahiti Coupe des Champions

==== UEFA ====
- (Albania) Albanian Supercup
- (Andorra) Andorran Supercup
- (Armenia) Armenian Supercup
- (Belarus) Belarusian Super Cup
- (Belgium) Belgian Super Cup
- (Bosnia and Herzegovina) Bosnian Supercup
- (Bulgaria) Bulgarian Supercup
- (Croatia) Croatian Football Super Cup
- (Cyprus) Cypriot Super Cup, Cypriot Women's Super Cup
- (England) FA Community Shield (formerly the Charity Shield), Women's FA Community Shield
- (Estonia) Estonian Supercup, Estonian Women's Supercup
- Faroe Islands Super Cup
- (France) Trophée des Champions, Trophée des Championnes
- (Georgia (country)) Georgian Super Cup
- (Germany) Franz Beckenbauer Supercup, DFB-Supercup Frauen
- (Gibraltar) Pepe Reyes Cup
- (Greece) Greek Super Cup
- (Iceland) Icelandic Super Cup
- Israel Super Cup
- (Italy) Supercoppa Italiana, Supercoppa Italiana (women)
- Kazakhstan Super Cup
- (Kosovo) Kosovar Supercup
- (Latvia) Latvian Supercup
- (Lithuania) Lithuanian Supercup
- (Malta) Maltese Super Cup
- (Moldova) Moldovan Super Cup
- (Netherlands) Johan Cruyff Shield, Nederlandse Supercup vrouwenvoetbal
- (Norway) Mesterfinalen
- (Northern Ireland) NIFL Charity Shield
- (Poland) Polish Super Cup
- Supertaça Cândido de Oliveira, Supertaça de Portugal Feminina
- (Republic of Ireland) President's Cup
- (Romania) Romanian Super Cup
- (Russia) Russian Super Cup
- (San Marino) Super Coppa Sammarinese
- (Spain) Supercopa de España, Supercopa de España Femenina
- (Turkey) Turkish Super Cup
- (Ukraine) Ukrainian Super Cup

==== Defunct super cups ====
- (Argentina) Trofeo de Campeones
- (Austria) Austrian Supercup
- Azerbaijan Supercup
- Bangladesh Super Cup
- (Belgium) (Netherlands) BeNe Super Cup
- (Cameroon) Super Coupe Roger Milla
- (Canada) (United States) North American Club Championship
- (Czech Republic) Czech Supercup
- (Denmark) Danish Super Cup
- (Estonia) (Latvia) (Lithuania) Baltic Champions Cup
- Supercoupe du Gabon
- (East Germany) DFV-Supercup
- Hong Kong Community Cup
- (Hungary) Szuperkupa
- (India) Indian Super Cup
- (Indonesia) Indonesian Community Shield
- (Mexico) Supercopa MX
- (Morocco) Moroccan Super Cup
- (Northern Ireland) Top Four Cup
- (North Macedonia) Macedonian Football Super Cup
- (Peru) Copa Federación
- (Slovakia) Slovak Super Cup
- (Slovenia) Slovenian Supercup
- (Switzerland) Swiss Super Cup
- (Sweden) Supercupen
- (Thailand) Thai Super Cup (top 4 places in last season, 2009 only)
- (Thailand) Kor Royal Cup
- (United Kingdom) Sheriff of London Charity Shield
- (Soviet Union) Soviet Super Cup (also known as the Season's Cup)
- (Socialist Federal Republic of Yugoslavia) Yugoslav Super Cup
- (Northern Cyprus) Northern Cypriot Super Cup

=== Interfederative super cups ===
- (Argentina) (Uruguay) Copa Aldao (league champions)
- (Czech Republic) (Slovakia) Czech-Slovak Supercup (cup champions)
- (Estonia) (Latvia) Livonia Cup (league champions)
- (Republic of Ireland) (Northern Ireland) Champions Cup (league champions)
- (Mexico) (United States) (Canada) Campeones Cup (league champions)
- (Saudi Arabia) (Egypt) Saudi-Egyptian Super Cup (league champions vs. cup champions)

=== Continental super cups ===
Some continental football federations also have their own super cups:

- AFC: Asian Super Cup (defunct)
- CAF: CAF Super Cup
- CONMEBOL: Recopa Sudamericana
- UEFA: UEFA Super Cup

=== Regional super cups ===
- GFF: GFF Gulf Club Super Cup
- UAFA: Arab Super Cup (defunct)

=== Intercontinental super cups ===
Most of the continental football confederations have jointly held a competition pitting their champions against each other:

- CONMEBOL – UEFA: Intercontinental Cup (defunct)
- CONCACAF – CONMEBOL: Copa Interamericana (defunct)
- AFC – CAF: Afro-Asian Club Championship (defunct)

All of these competitions are now defunct and have been succeeded by the FIFA Club World Cup and the FIFA Intercontinental Cup, which features the champions of all of the confederations. In 2017, FIFA retroactively recognised the winners of the European/South American Cup as world champions.

A similar tournament was held at international level, the FIFA Confederations Cup. It was initially held on a biennial basis, every odd year, from 1993 until 2005 when it became quadrennial, the year before a World Cup in its host country. It featured the six continental champions, the World Cup winners and the host. The 2017 FIFA Confederations Cup was the 10th and last Confederations Cup before FIFA abolished it for an expanded Club World Cup. CONMEBOL and UEFA relaunched the CONMEBOL-UEFA Cup of Champions in 2020, previously held as the European/South American Nations Cup in 1985 and 1993, to be contested between the champions of both confederations. The rebooted cup, now branded as the Finalissima, held its first edition in 2022, with quadrennial editions to follow. The two confederations launched a Women's Finalissima in 2023, involving the most recent winners of the Copa América Femenina and Women's Euro. It is also planned to be a quadrennial event.

Other tournaments like this have been held, including the Intercontinental Champions' Supercup (contested by the past winners of the Intercontinental Cup), the Club Challenge, previously held as Supercopa Euroamericana (pitting the Copa Sudamericana and UEFA Europa League winners), the J.League-Sudamericana Championship (pitting the Copa Sudamericana and J.League Cup winners), the Copa de Oro (pitting all the most recent CONMEBOL competition winners), and the Copa Iberoamericana (pitting the Copa de Oro and Copa del Rey winners).

== Basketball ==
=== Domestic super cups ===
- Algeria Basketball Supercup
- (Austria) Austrian Supercup
- (Belgium) Belgian Supercup
- (Netherlands) Dutch Supercup
- (France) French Match des Champions
- (Germany) German BBL Champions Cup
- (Greece) Greek Super Cup
- (Israel) Israeli Supercup
- (Italy) Italian Supercup
- Jordan Basketball Supercup
- (Poland) Polish Supercup
- (Portugal) Portuguese SuperCup
- (Romania) Romanian Supercup
- (Slovenia) Slovenian Supercup
- (Spain) Spanish Supercup
- (Turkey) Turkish Presidential Cup and Turkish Women's Basketball Presidential Cup

=== Regional ===
(Belgium) & (Netherlands)

- BNXT Supercup (Belgium & the Netherlands)

(Bosnia and Herzegovina) (Croatia) (Montenegro) (North Macedonia) (Serbia) (Slovenia)

- Adriatic Supercup (former Yugoslavia)

=== Continental level ===
- EuroLeague SuperCup
- FIBA Europe SuperCup Women: contested between the winners of EuroLeague Women and EuroCup Women.

== Water polo ==
=== Domestic super cups ===
- (Spain) Supercopa de España de Waterpolo: an annual men's water polo match contested between the winners of División de Honor de Waterpolo and Copa del Rey de Waterpolo.
- (Spain) Supercopa de España de Waterpolo Femenino: an annual women's water polo match contested between the winners of División de Honor Femenina de Waterpolo and Copa de la Reina de Waterpolo.

=== Continental super cups ===
- Men's European Aquatics Super Cup: an annual water polo match organized by European Aquatics and contested by the reigning champions of the two European club competitions, the European Aquatics Champions League and the European Aquatics Euro Cup.
- European Aquatics Women's Super Cup: an annual water polo match organized by the LEN (European Swimming League) and contested by the reigning champions of the two European club competitions, the European Aquatics Women's Champions League and the European Aquatics Women's Euro Cup.

== Motorsports ==
- The ADAC Supercup, commonly known as Supercup, was a German sports car racing series held between 1986 and 1989.
- Ginetta GT4 Supercup, a British 2-class 1-make sports car racing series.
- Porsche Supercup, an international one-make racing series for Porsche 911 Carreras.
- Mieczysław Połukard Criterium of Polish Speedway Leagues Aces, Józef Piłsudski Stadium, Bydgoszcz, Poland, curtain raiser, official opening of the new season in motorcycle speedway in Poland

== Rugby ==
=== Rugby league ===
- The current format of the rugby league World Club Challenge sees the winners of the Super League from Europe face the National Rugby League winners from Australasia, and was last played in 2024. In 1997, 2015, 2016 and 2017, the game formed part of an expanded tournament that included as few as four and as many as twenty-two teams.
- The Charity Shield is a defunct super cup competition in British rugby league, contested by the winners of the RFL Championship First Division and RFL Challenge Cup.

=== Rugby union ===
- The Super Powers Cup was an annual international rugby union competition contested by national teams from Canada, Japan, Russia and United States. In 2005, its name was changed to the Super Cup.

== Other sports ==
- IIHF Super Cup, a defunct ice hockey competition

== See also ==
- Super League (disambiguation)
- World Series (disambiguation)
- Superbowl (disambiguation)
