= Continental Hockey League (disambiguation) =

The Continental Hockey League (est. 2008) is an international ice hockey league in Russia and Europe, usually known as Kontinental Hockey League.

Continental Hockey League may also refer to:

- Continental Hockey League (1972–1986), an ice hockey league replaced by All-American Hockey League (1986–1989)
- Continental Elite Hockey League, a former independent junior hockey league
- Continental Junior Hockey League, a short-lived, 2-team league
- Continental Hockey Association, a former Tier 3 junior ice hockey league, frequently called the Continental Hockey League

== See also ==
- CHL (disambiguation)
