= Central Hockey League (disambiguation) =

The Central Hockey League (1992–2014) was a minor professional ice hockey league.

Central Hockey League may also refer to:

- Central Hockey League (1925–1926) (later the American Hockey Association), a semi-professional league
- Central Hockey League (1931–1935), a minor professional league
- Central Hockey League (1951–1960), a senior amateur league
- Central Hockey League (1963–1984), a minor professional league, formerly the Central Professional Hockey League
- USA Central Hockey League (2018), a junior league based in the southwest United States

== See also ==
- Central Canada Hockey League, a junior league based in Eastern Ontario known as the Central Hockey League in 2010–2011
- CHL (disambiguation)
