= Shelley D. Minteer =

Professor of analytical chemistry

- Born: 1975 (age 50–51)
- Education: Saint Louis University; University of Iowa
- Awards: American Association for the Advancement of Science Fellow
- Scientific career
- Workplaces: Saint Louis University; University of Utah

Shelley D. Minteer (born 1975) is an American academic and chemistry professor at the University of Utah. Minteer field of study focuses on the interface between biocatalysts and enzyme-based electrodes for biofuel cells and sensors.

== Education and early career ==
Minteer received a bachelor's in chemistry from Western Illinois University in 1995 and earned her doctorate under the supervision of Johna Leddy from the University of Iowa in 2000. In 2000, Minteer joined Saint Louis University as an assistant professor. While there she joined the American Institute of Chemical Engineers (AIChE) education academy. At Saint Louis University, Minteer worked on several inventions, including drug delivery systems, enzymes, and novel electrodes. She developed enzyme immobilization membranes to improve the stability of biosensor and biofuel electrodes. In 2003 Minteer and her graduate student Nick Akers co-founded Akermin to commercialise their work on mitochondria-based biofuel cells. She was made a full professor at Saint Louis University in 2008.

== Research and career ==
Minteer worked at Saint Louis University for eleven years before joining the University of Utah in 2011. She studies the interface between biocatalysts and electrode surfaces for bioelectrocatalysis. She works on enzyme cascades for bioelectrocatalysis as well as organelle bioelectrocatalysis for detection of microscopic events. She also works on the production of biofuels, using synthetic biology and nanotechnology to improve the production. Minteer became interested in extending the lifetimes of fuels and improving the efficiency of oxidation. She demonstrated the first room temperature enzyme-based fuel cells in 2014. The fuel cells use JP-8, a kerosene based fuel cells used by the United States Armed Forces, as well as enzymes as catalysts to oxidise the JP-8.

She was the first to demonstrate paper-based batteries using an electrode coated in bacteria. The batteries can be used to power biosensors and sensor networks. Minteer looks to bioengineer natural metabolic pathways for bioanodes in biofuel cells and the discovery of enzymes. In 2015 Minteer joined the Joint Center for Energy Storage Research to help take more rational design for redox flow batteries. Her efforts include the development of electroanalytical and spectroscopic assays to determine quantitative structure–activity relationship modelling. She works on electrolytes that minimise crossover and more soluble electrolytes. Minteer worked with Brett Helms at University of California, Berkeley on electroanalytical tools to study oligomer electrolytes.

Minteer is an associate editor of the Journal of the American Chemical Society, having previously served as an editor of the Journal of the Electrochemical Society.

== Awards and honors ==
- 2018 American Chemical Society Division of Analytical Chemistry Award in Electrochemistry
- 2018 American Association for the Advancement of Science Fellow
- 2015 Bioelectrochemical Society Luigi Galvani Prize
- 2013 Electrochemical Society Fellow
- 2010 International Society of Electrochemistry Tajima Prize
- 2008 American Chemical Society St. Louis Award
- 2008 Scientific American Top 50
- 2008 Society of Electroanalytical Chemists Young Investigator Award
- 2006 United States Department of Defense Okaloosa Award

== Books ==
- 2006 Springer Nature Microfluidic Techniques
- 2006 Springer Nature Alcoholic Fuels
- 2010 Humana Press Methods in Molecular Biology, Volume 679: Enzyme Stabilization and Immobilization: Methods and Protocols
