= Central League (Polish men's handball) =

Liga Centralna
- Current season, competition or edition: 2023/24
- Association: Polish Handball Association
- Sport: Handball
- First season: 2020/21
- No. of teams: 15
- Country: Poland
- Most recent champion: KPR Legionowo (1 title)
- Most titles: KPR Ostrovia Ostrów Wielkopolski (1 title); KPR Legionowo (1 title)
- Level on pyramid: 2
- Promotion to: Superliga
- Relegation to: 1 liga

The Central League (Polish - Liga Centralna) is a Polish professional handball league and the second level of the Polish men's handball pyramid. It is administered by the Polish Handball Association.
It was created in 2021 with 14 teams, expanded to 15 in 2023. The highest placed team gets promoted to the Superliga, while the second-best team participates in a two-match play-off against the second worst team of the season's Superliga. Two worst teams are demoted to the I liga.

== Winners ==
| Sezon | 1st place | 2nd place | 3rd place |
|---|---|---|---|
| 2021/2022 | Ostrovia Ostrów Wielkopolski | KPR Legionowo | AZS-AWF Biała Podlaska |
| 2022/2023 | KPR Legionowo | Stal Mielec | AZS-AWF Biała Podlaska |
| 2023/2024 | Śląsk Wrocław | KPR Padwa Zamość | GKS Żukowo |

== See also ==
- Polish Superliga
- Polish Handball Cup
