= European league =

European league may refer to:

- CERH European League (roller hockey)
  - CERH Women's European League
- Men's European Volleyball League
- Women's European Volleyball League
- European Bridge League
- European League of Football

== See also ==
- Euro league (disambiguation)
- European Super League (disambiguation)
- UEFA Europa League (association football)
- FIBA Europe League (basketball)
- NFL Europe League (American football)
