= China Badminton Super League =

Badminton competition in China

China Badminton Super League 中国羽毛球俱乐部超级联赛
- Sport: Badminton
- Founded: 2009
- First season: 2009
- Administrator: Chinese Badminton Association
- No. of teams: 8–12
- Country: China
- Tournament format: Double round-robin and knock-out
- Website: http://cbsl.sports.cn/

The China Badminton Super League (CBSL) (Chinese: 中国羽毛球俱乐部超级联赛) is the prime National team competition for badminton players in China. The China Badminton Super League was re-launched in 2009 after a failing attempt seven years earlier. Liu Fengyan, director of the Table Tennis and Badminton Administration Center under China's State General Administration of Sport, announced the re-launch during the 50th anniversary meeting of the Chinese Badminton Association.

The China Badminton Super League (CBSL) has welcomed huge sponsorship deals hereby attracting top players from China and abroad to the participating teams.

== Format ==
The China Badminton Super League is a mixed team event, like the Sudirman Cup. After the inaugural first season the league was divided into two round-robin stages and then a final elimination stage. The clubs will be placed according to points accumulated by the end of this stage. After the inaugural season eight clubs were selected. Later from 2012 twelve clubs participated divided into two round-robin groups of each six clubs and from 2015 on the competition was back to eight teams.

In the round-robins, each of the participating clubs will be playing against every other club twice, once on their home courts, and the other on their opponent's. Next, in the elimination stage, the first four ranking teams in the round-robins will be placed in a group, equaling to the semifinal. At first the bottom four were also placed in another group, fighting for a better placing from among fifth to eighth spot. Like in the round-robins, at first the semifinalists had to play twice, once in each club's home courts. An extra round would be played if the teams end up with a tie. But from 2015 on a single semi-final tie was played. Also once a team had already won the first three matches in a tie, each game in the following matches would only be played to 11 points instead of 21. Later this was also eliminated when a tie was decided in the final stages no further match was played.

From the 2013 season the CBSL competition rules were significantly changed. First, the 21-point games was scrapped in favor of a greatly scaled down 11-point system in order to reduce the duration of each competition to meet the requirement of live telecasts. By this means, the CBSL organization committee was able to convince sports channel CCTV to broadcast some focus competitions both in the group and knock-out stages. With live telecasts, commercial prospects for the CBSL seem much brighter and this may have attracted more and more financial supports from business enterprises. The scoring change had also created more uncertainty and suspense for each match.

Second, they introduced mixed three-on-three into the team competition. 3-on-3 was originally used as a training drill inside national team to enhance the reaction speed of doubles players. With three players on each side, the speed and pace of the match is very quick and exciting. From 2013 till 2015 each competition included 5 matches: men's singles, women's singles, and mixed 3-on-3 match which were fixed, while another two matches alternated among men's doubles, mixed doubles and women's doubles.

A third alteration was the addition of one amateur men's doubles match before the start of each competition. In an attempt to increase public involvement and interaction with the CBSL, the players were selected from local amateur events. As members of the clubs they were rewarded with some training courses. By playing in the CBSL events, the players could earn points of CBA amateur ranking system or even prizes if their performances were good enough.

From 2015 on the above-mentioned changes were turned around again by the organizers of the CBSL to the normal Sudirman Cup format and the normal 21 point scoring system.

== 2009 season ==
2009 was the inaugural season for the China Badminton Super League. Only in this first season a total of 14 teams participated in the preliminary qualification stage. Ultimately only 8 of these teams then took part in the main stage of the CBSL. The 14 teams originally taking part in the preliminary rounds in the first 2009 season were:

- Beijing Shichalai
- Shanghai 1 Trillion Wade
- Jiangsu Yonex
- Zhejiang Tong
- Fujian
- Hubei SOTA
- Hunan Kawasaki
- Guangdong Li-Ning
- Guangxi
- Sichuan Chuanwei
- Qingdao Beer
- Xiamen Wei Shi
- Guangzhou Southern
- 81 Chivas (PLA - Chinese People's Liberation Army)

The top teams of each of the four groups entered the semifinals. The four teams that went to the semifinals were 81 Chivas, Jiangsu Yonex, Hubei and home-team Guangzhou where the ties took place. In the first semi-final, Jiangsu beat Hubei 3-0. In the second semi-final 81 Chivas beat Guangzhou 3-0. In the final the strong and powerful Jiangsu Yonex team beat 81 Chivas with 3-0. The 2009 CBSL championship team of Jiangsu Yonex included top players like Wang Shixian, Tao Jiaming, Sun Xiaoli, Cheng Shu, Tang Jinhua, Li Yu, Zhi Luoliang, Cai Yun, Xu Chen and Lu Lan. Based on the results of the inaugural first year's CBSL competition, 8 clubs were selected to play in the next 2010 China Badminton Club Super League in a new home and away system.

== 2010 season ==
The 2010 season started with a round-robin system for the 8 participating teams. There were a few unique rules in the China Badminton Super League from 2010:

1. Teams placed fourth and fifth at the end of the round-robins had to fight in a PK round where the winner proceeded as the fourth team, joining the semifinal match, while the loser fell to the fifth-to-eighth placing group.

2. The first-placing team in the round-robins will pick a semi-final opponent from either the third or fourth placing team. While the winners proceed into the finals, the defeated team with a higher placing in the round-robins will be placed third, and the lower one placed fourth. Aside from that, the seventh-placing team in the round-robins will also pick an opponent from the teams placed fifth and sixth. The four teams in this group will only play one elimination match each. The two winning teams will be placed fifth and sixth according to their placing in the round-robins, and the defeated teams placed seventh and eighth under the same rule.

3. The team placed eighth at the end of the league will play a match against the champion of the National A-Grade One League, where the winner earns a chance to play in the coming China Super League with the loser dropping-out.

The composition of the players from each team in the 2010 China Badminton Super League are shown below;

Guangzhou: Doubles: Guo Zhendong, Hong Wei, Gan Zhaolong, Zhang Jinkang, Zhang Jiewen, Zhong Qianxin Singles: Wang Zhengming, Liu Xin

Hubei: Doubles: Yu Yang, Wang Xiaoli, Rao Yuqiang, Ding Yang, Li Rui, Zhao Yunlei, Li Junyang Singles: Li Wen, Wen Kai, Chen Yuekun

Hunan: Doubles: Zheng Bo, Tian Qing, Xia Huan, Chai Biao, Zhang Wen, Liu Peixuan, Bao Yixin Singles: Shi Xiaoqian, Bao Chunlai, Chen Xiaojia

Jiangsu: Doubles: Tang Jinhua, Cheng Shu, Cai Yun, Xu Chen, Tao Jiaming, Sun Xiaoli Singles: Lu Lan, Wang Shixian, Chen Jin, Li Yu, Qiu Yanbo

Bayi BC - PLA (Chinese People's Liberation Army): Doubles: He Hanbin, Feng Chen, Pan Pan, Li Xuerui, He Hangqing, Li Gen Singles: Lin Dan, Jiang Yanjiao

Zhejiang: Doubles: Sang Yan, Zhang Nan, Zhang Yawen, Zhou Hui Singles: Wang Lin, Du Pengyu, Huang Yuxiang

Qingdao: Doubles: Qiu Zihan, Ma Jin, Du Jing, Fu Haifeng, Shen Ye, Luo Yu Singles: Zhou Wenlong, Wang Xin, Liu Jingru

Shanghai: Doubles: Chen Zhiben, Xie Jing, Liu Yingchun, Yu Hao, Yu Junjie, Shi Hong, Hu Minyu Singles: Chen Long, Wang Yihan, Zhu Lin, Lu Qicheng

After almost two months of playing, the year's 2010 Chinese Badminton Super League came to an end. The year's two finalists were Qingdao and Hunan. Qingdao was expected to be in the final as they finished in the top 3 after the second round robin stage. In the semifinals against Jiangsu, they were defeated 3:2 whereas Qingdao won by a bigger margin at home, 3:0. As each club won once, they had to play a rubber tie and Qingdao defeated Jiangsu 3:0 to advance to the final.

In the other semi-final, Hunan, the dark horse, defeated Bayi BC, the 81st post of the Chinese People's Liberation Army (the strongest club led by Lin Dan and Jiang Yanjiao). Chinese People's Liberation Army was ranked first after the second round robin stage. In the semifinals, Hunan lost to Chinese People's Liberation Army 1:3 at home whilst Chinese People's Liberation Army lost to Hunan 2:3 at home. As each club won once, they also had to play a tie. At last, Hunan defeated Chinese People's Liberation Army 3:1 with the absence of Lin Dan in the tie. Qingdao beat Hunan 3:2 in the first leg of the final. After also winning the second leg of the final of the China Badminton Super League with a convincing 3:1 win from Qingdao over Hunan, the 2010 championship title was sealed. Shanghai ended up as the weakest team during the 2010 league as they never won a tie. They lost 18 out of 18 matches they had played. According to league regulations, Shanghai had to compete with the champion of the Badminton League One to decide whether they still could stay and play in next year's Chinese Badminton Super League.

Final Team ranking 2010 CBSL:

1st – Qingdao – GOLD, 2nd – Hunan – SILVER, 3rd – Jiangsu, & (Bayi BC) PLA - Chinese People's Liberation Army – (both teams) BRONZE,

5th – Zhejiang, 6th – Guangzhou, 7th – Hubei, 8th – Shanghai – had to play for relegation

== 2011 season ==
The 2011 CBSL season started with the round-robin system for the 8 participating teams. The composition of the players from each team in the 2011 China Badminton Super League are shown below:

Shanghai Zi Wei Ke Badminton Club

- Male players: Chen Long, Lu Qicheng, Gu Chao, Yu Junjie, Yu Hao, Shi Hong
- Female players: Zhu Lin, Wang Yihan, Xie Jing, Liu Yingchun, Hu Minyu, Kang Yiling

JiangSu Yonex Badminton Club

- Male players: Chen Jin, Sun Junjie, Tao Jiaming, Li Yu, Qiu Yanbo, Guo Cheng
- Female players: Wang Shixian, Sun Xiaoli, Tang Jinhua, Dong Yourong, Xong Mengjing, Shao Jiahui

ZheJiang Yin Jiang Badminton Club

- Male players: Du Pengyu, Sang Yang, Ding Yang, Guo Zi Yu, Huang Yuxiang, Wang Sijie
- Female players: Zhang Yawen, Wang Lin, Zhou Hui, Huang Yaqiong, Du Peng

Wuhan Autocity Badminton Club

- Male players: Li Rui, Wen Kai, Rao Yuqiang, Ding Yang, Chen Yuekun, Li Junyang
- Female players: Yu Yang, Wang Xiaoli, Zhao Yunlei, Li Wen, Chen Xi, Fang Aixian

Hunan Xiangcai Securities Badminton Club

- Male players: Bao Chunlai, Zheng Bo, Chai Biao, Zhang Shen, Zhang Wen, Dong Shuai
- Female players: Tian Qing, Shi Xiao Qian, Xia Huan, Bao Yixin, Chen Xiaojia, Xie Siyu

QingDao Beer Badminton Club

- Male players: Fu Haifeng, Shen Ye, Qiu Zihan, Zhou Wenlong
- Female players: Wang Xin, Liu Jie, Wang Siyun, Ma Jin, Luo Ying, Luo Yu

Guangzhou Yueyu Badminton Club

- Male players: Wang Zhengming, Gan Zhaolong, Yang Jie, Tang Junxian, Lee Chong Wei, Taufik Hidayat
- Female players: Deng Xuan, Zhong Qianxin, Ou Dongni, Mei Qili, Xiao Ting

Bayi Dongling Refinery Badminton Club

- Male players: Lin Dan, He Hanbin, He Hanqing, Li Gen
- Female players: Li Xuerui, Xiong Shuai, Luo Cheng, Jiang Yanjiao, Pan Pan, Feng Chen

The China League's defending champion, Qingdao Beer took on the previous year's runner-up Hunan Xiangcai Securities in the 2011 final battle. According to the league's regulations, a team is declared champion if placed top of the list twice at the end of both cycles. If a different team grabs the first place in the second cycle, the team with a higher ranking within top four in the other cycle wins.

With a #1 finish in the first cycle, the Qingdao versus Hunan match was the utmost deciding match for the former team, who were still fighting for the last ticket into the top four of the second cycle, hoping to grab the final victory of the league. If first cycle's runner-up Hunan had won, it would have been a taste of victory for them instead, while Qingdao would have fallen off to the 7th place in the cycle, ending the season only as the second runner-up.

Hunan, on the other hand, who ended up second in both cycles, became the league's runner-up again as they did last year. While Bayi, the club under the lead of Lin Dan shared the same luck, ending up as the second runner-up yet again.

Final results: 1st (Winner): QINGDAO Beer - GOLD, 2nd (Runner-up): HUNAN Xiangcai Securities - SILVER, 3rd (2nd Runner-up): BAYI Dongling Refineries - BRONZE,

4th place: WUHAN Hubei Autocity, 5th place: ZHEJIANG Yinjiang, 6th place: GUANGZHOU Yueyu, 7th place: JIANGSU Yonex, 8th place: SHANGHAI Zi Wei Ke

== 2012 season ==
The 2012 CBSL season started with a new round-robin system for a total of 12 participating teams. The teams were divided into a North Group and a South Group of relatively even strength by order of 2011 ranking. After each six-team groups has played two round-robin iterations (home and away) from August 25 till October 13, 2012, the final stages took place in a play-off format from November 1 till December 9, 2012. The top four finishers in each group advanced into the playoffs in a knockout format, home and away, plus tie-breaker if necessary.

The composition of the players from each team in the 2012 China Badminton Super League are shown below:

Shanghai Zi Wei Ke Badminton Club

- Male players: Chen Long, Lu Qicheng, Wu Junchao, Gu Chao, Yu Junjie, Yu Hao, Shi Hong, Xie Yiji
- Female players: Wang Yihan, Hu Minyu, Liu Yingchun, Kang Yiling, Xu Wenpei, Chen Tingting, Liu Mengyi, Jiang Yujing

Beijing Guanyu Badminton Club

- Male players: Qiao Bin, Qi Shuangshuang, Yu Xiaoyu, Bao Zilong, Huang Haoda, Huang Guoxing, Chen Zhiben, Lu Yi
- Female players: Chen Tianyu, Qi Xuefei, Chen Jiao, Suo Di, Yu Xiaohan, Ma Xixi, Wang Mengyan, Xie Jing

Guangdong Oppein Badminton Club

- Male players: Fu Haifeng, Zhang Zhijun, Chen Luoxun, Guo Junjie, Xue Song, He Xianglong, Zeng Weijie, Xu Junjie, Jiang Rui
- Female players: Xia Jingyun, Sun Yu, He Jiaxin, Chen Qingchen, Wang Nan, Li Yi, Qi Xin

JiangSu Development Badminton Club

- Male players: Chen Jin, Li Yu, Qiu Yanbo, Sun Junjie, Tao Jiaming, Guo Cheng, Hu Qianyuan, Kang Jun
- Female players: Wang Shixian, Sun Xiaoli, Tang Jinhua, Hui Xirui, Xong Mengjing, Cheng Shu

ZheJiang Yin Jiang Badminton Club

- Male players: Xu Chen, Sang Yang, Guo Zi Yu, Huang Yuxiang, Wang Sijie, Lee Chong Wei
- Female players: Wang Lin, Zhang Yawen, Zhou Hui, Huang Yaqiong, Li Xiao

Wuhan Union Real Estate Badminton Club

- Male players: Chen Yuekun, Li Rui, Rao Yuqiang, Li Junyang, Liu Ming, Zhang Nan, Jin Qiuwei, Hendra Setiawan, Alvent Yulianto Chandra,
- Female players: Zhao Yunlei, Wang Xiaoli, Li Wen, Chen Xi, Fang Aixian, Tian Tian, Zhang Jing, Kang Qian, Jiang Rui, Huang Yan Lin

Shenyang Machine Tool Badminton Club

- Male players: Gao Huan, Lu Kai, Liu Peixuan, Li Peng, He Mu, Kenichi Hayakawa, Hiroyuki Endo, Zhou Wenlong, Chen Mingyu, Yang Fan
- Female players: Yu Yang, Su Lan, Zhang Yeji, Diao Zhe, Liu Fanghua, Xie Yang, Jiang Yanjiao, Du Jing, Jia Lin

Hunan Xiangyu Badminton Club

- Male players: Bao Chunlai, Chai Biao, Zhang Sheng, Dong Shuai, Zhang Wen, Chen Zhuofu, Pan Jiangliuhai, Zeng Junwei
- Female players: Tian Qing, Chen Xiaojia, Xia Huan, Xie Siyu, Zeng Xi, Jia Yifan

QingDao Beer Badminton Club

- Male players: Shen Ye, Zhang Moran, Liu Jingru, Guan Xiaodong, Du Pengyu, Hong Wei, Qiu Zihan, Li Qi
- Female players: Ma Jin, Wei Yaqi, Geng Jian, Yang Yuting, Luo Ying, Luo Yu, Liu Jie, Ratchanok Intanon

Guangzhou Yueyu Badminton Club

- Male players: Wang Zhengming, Li Yisheng, Lin Dehao, Chen Jinlin, Zheng Bo, Taufik Hidayat, Chen Wenhong, Koo Kien Keat
- Female players: Deng Xuan, Zhong Qianxin, Ou Dongni, Mei Qili, Bao Yixin, Lu Lan

Sichuan Chuanwei Badminton Club

- Male players: Xie Zhongbo, Dong Xiao, Pei Tianyi, Fu Jinlong, Zhu Siyuan, Li Ran, Deng Xuedi
- Female players: Yang Jialu, Wu Qianqian, Xia Chunyu, Han Li, Jia Wei, Chen Jie

Bayi Dongling Group Badminton Club

- Male players: Lin Dan, He Hanbin, He Hanqing, Li Gen, Liu Xiaolong, Zhou Yujie, Xiong Shuai, Luo Cheng, Li Jie
- Female players: Pan Pan, Li Xuerui, Feng Chen, Wang Xin, Zheng Yu, Qin Jinjing, Rui Xiong, Xiao Jia

Eventually Guangzhou Yueyu Badminton Club became the winner of the 2012 China Badminton Super League. The first best-of-5 final play-off tie between Guangzhou and 2 times champion, powerhouse Qingdao Beer Badminton Club, was played on December 6 at Guangzhou's home court and won by the home team with 3:1. The second tie was held on December 8 and transferred to defending champion Qingdao club's home court. Guangzhou Club also took the second tie with a 3:2 victory and became champions of the 2012 China Badminton Super League.

== 2013–14 season ==
At the start of the 2013 season the CBSL competition rules have been significantly changed. First, the 21-point games have been scrapped in favor of a greatly scaled down 11-point system in order to reduce the duration of each competition to meet the requirement of live telecasts.

Second, they introduced mixed three-on-three into the team competition. 3-on-3 was originally used as a training drill inside the China national team to enhance the reaction speed of doubles players. With three players on each side, the speed and pace of the match is very quick and exciting. Now each competition include 5 matches: men's singles, women's singles, and mixed 3-on-3 match are fixed, while another two matches alternating among men's doubles, mixed doubles and women's doubles.

A third alteration is the addition of one amateur men's doubles match before the start of each competition. The players are selected from local amateur events. As members of the clubs they were rewarded with some training courses. By playing in the CBSL events, the players could earn points of CBA amateur ranking system or even prizes if their performances are good enough.

The composition of the players from each of the twelve participating teams in the 2013 China Badminton Super League are shown below:

Shanghai Huangpu Badminton Club

- Male players: Xin Anqi, Wu Junchao, Tang Pingyang, Shi Longfei, He Liu, Shi Hong, Xie Yiji, Qiao Bin, Qiu Zihan, Xu Xinyi, Zhao Jian, Chen Yuekun
- Female players: Wang Yihan, Kang Yiling, Jiang Yujing, Jiang Binbin, Tang Yuanting, Xu Wenfei, Chen Tingting, Lu Lu, Rong Zhizhen

Guangdong Century City Badminton Club

- Male players: Cai Yun, Fu Haifeng, Ren Xiangyu, Lei Lanxi, Yang Zhen, Li Zhe, Wen Kai, Tang Sonhua, Wu Jun, Lee Chong Wei, Xu Chen, Tian Houwei
- Female players: Jiang Yanjiao, Liu Xin, Tang Jinhua, Yu Xiaohan, Xu Ya, Hu Yuxiang, Yang Hongqi, Li Ruobi Li, Luo Yuxin

Guangdong Badminton Club

- Male players: Zhang Zhijun, Chen Luoxun, Xue Song, Xu Junjie, Wang Peng, Zheng Yumin, Liao Junwei, Jin Sheng, Zhang Yihan
- Female players: He Jiaxin, Yao Xue, Chen Qingchen, Xia Jingyun, Wang Zekang, Bai Xueyun, Zheng Xuhui, Fu Xue, Xie Zhenyang, Luo Jiaxin

JiangSu Xiongwei Jianshe Badminton Club

- Male players: Li Yu, Sun Junjie, Tao Jiaming, Guo Cheng, Kang Jun, Tao Jiale, Hu Qianyuan, Tang Zhenning, Xu Xiaofeng
- Female players: Wang Shixian, Sun Xiaoli, Hui Xirui, Xong Mengjing, Cheng Shu, He Bingjiao, Dong Yourong

ZheJiang Yin Jiang Badminton Club

- Male players: Wang Yilyu, Sang Yang, Guo Kai, Huang Yuxiang, Wang Sijie, Zhuge Lukai, Zheng Siwei, Lin Guipu, Zhang Nan,
- Female players: Zhao Yunlei, Wang Lin, Qiao Lingzi, Zhou Hui, Huang Yaqiong, Du Peng, Shao Jingjing, Wang Xinyuan, Chen Yufei

Hubei Badminton Club

- Male players: Li Rui, Liu Ming, Bi Shijun, Zhang Ningyi, Li Heliu, Zhang Yuxia, Huang Duoduo, Jin Qiuwei, Liu Yuheng
- Female players: Li Wen, Chen Xi, Fang Aixian, Tian Tian, Du Yue, Li Yanhui, Zhang Jing, Jiang Rui, Huang Yan Lin, Linying Shiyu

Liaoning Badminton Club

- Male players: Gao Huan, Lu Kai, Li Peng, Li Junhui, Zhou Wenlong, Chen Mingyu, Liu Yuchen, Yang Fan, Liu Peixuan
- Female players: Yu Yang, Su Lan, Zhang Yeji, Xie Yang, Du Jing, Liu Fanghua, Han Li, Jia Lin, Li Shengnan, Diao Zhe, Chen Bowen

Hunan Xiangyu Badminton Club

- Male players: Bao Chunlai, Chai Biao, Zheng Bo, Dong Shuai, Zhang Wen, Chen Zhuofu, Pan Jiangliuhai, Chen Huilin, Zhou Zeqi
- Female players: Tian Qing, Chen Xiaojia, Xia Huan, Zeng Xi, Jia Yifan, Xie Siyu, Lin Yuanrui, Bao Yixin

Qingdao Zuanshi Xianfeng Badminton Club

- Male players: Zhang Moran, Liu Jingru, Li Qi, Li Tian, Guo Yuchen, Liu Jie, Xie Binyu, Dou Yaowei
- Female players: Wei Yaqi, Yang Yuting, Liu Jie, Wang Xiaoxing, Luo Ying, Luo Yu, Ratchanok Intanon, Wang Siyun, Shuai Tian Tian, Lu Yongbei, Zhao Xueyan

Guangzhou Yueyu Badminton Club

- Male players: Wang Zhengming, Li Yisheng, Lin Dehao, Tang Junxian, Shen Ye, Guo Junjie, Mohammad Ahsan, Hendra Setiawan, Lee Sheng Mu, Tsai Chia Hsin
- Female players: Ma Jin, Sun Yu, Deng Xuan, Zhong Qianxin, Ou Dongni, Mei Qili, Xiao Ting

Xiamen Defang Badminton Club

- Male players: Yang Chen, Chen Long, Hong Wei, Zhou Zhe, Liu Xiaolong, Wang Zhicheng, Liu Cheng,
- Female players: Wang Xiaoli, Huang Dongping, Liu Linlin, Cheng Yuwei, Lin Minying, Li Tian, Xu Chaoyu, Juliane Schenk

Bayi Dongling Group Badminton Club

- Male players: Lin Dan, He Hanbin, He Hanqing, Li Gen, Zhou Yujie, Xiong Shuai, Luo Cheng, Li Jie, Wu Xin
- Female players: Li Xuerui, Wang Xin, Feng Chen, Zheng Yu, Qin Jinjing, Rui Xiong, Jiang Yu, Xiao Jia

The 2013–14 edition of CBSL was run from September 28, 2013 to June 5, 2014. The match dates were set to avoid conflict with BWF Super Series, BWF Super Series Masters Finals, and BWF Grand Prix Gold events. Twelve teams were competing in total, including ten CBSL teams from the previous season, plus two strong newcomers Xiamen and GuangDong Century City. The regular season was played in a double round robin systems with the twelve teams divided in two groups. In the Play-offs the top two from each group played to decide 1-4 in a knock-out format; then 3-3, 4-4, 5-5 for other placements; the last two teams were relegated to the First Division Badminton League One. The semifinals were contested between GuangZhou and GuangDong Century City on one side and Jiangsu and Xiamen on the other side. Eventually the final ties were played between Xiamen and GuangDong Century City with GuangZhou and Jiangsu fighting for 3rd place. In the 1st leg of the final, GuangDong Century City beat Xiamen Defang 3:1 with Chen Long winning the only match for XDF against Tian Houwei of GDCC in two straight sets. In the 2nd leg of the final, GuangDong Century City again beat Xiamen Defang 3:1 to emerge China Super League champion 2013–14 having won two of the "best of three" team match-ups. 3rd place went to Guangzhou Yueyu Weihao who defeated Jiangsu Xiongwei Jiangshe 3:1.

== 2014–15 season ==
In the 2014–15 season a match was decided by a best 3 of 5 games to 11-point score. There were no breaks within each game but there were breaks of less than 60 seconds between each games. The mixed team format continues. There are again 12 teams divided into 2 groups of 6. The first stage was a double round robin. The top 2 teams in each group entered the knock out stage.

The composition of the players from each of the twelve participating teams in the 2014–15 China Badminton Super League are shown below:

Sichuan Jinli Zhiye Badminton Club

- Male players: Pei Tianyi, Zhu Siyuan, Deng Xuedi, Zhou Bowei, Gao Xiangfu, Hu Jiehui, Chai Lijian, Zheng Yuanbin, Yu Chen, Gao Xiangcheng
- Female players: Wu Qianqian, Xia Chunyu, Han Li, Xu Wei, Han Yushan, Wei Yawen, Yang Manlin, Liu Zidie, Li Sizhuo, Hu Xianglin

Guangdong Century City Badminton Club

- Male players: Fu Haifeng, Xu Chen, Tian Houwei, Ren Xiangyu, Lei Lanxi, Li Gen, Zheng Siwei, Zhang Nan
- Female players: Tang Jinhua, Liu Xin, Yu Xiaohan, Xu Ya, Hu Yuxiang, Chen Fanghui, Liu Siyi

Guangdong Badminton Club

- Male players: Zhang Zhijun, Xue Song, Xu Junjie, Wang Peng, Zheng Yumin, Liao Junwei, Xu Zuopeng, Zhang Yihan
- Female players: Gao Huichong, He Jiaxin, Wu Yingshi, Chen Qingchen, Zhan Anqi, Wang Zekang, Zheng Xuhui, Fu Xue, Xie Zhenrui, Luo Jiaxin

JiangSu Badminton Club

- Male players: Kang Jun, Shen Chengcheng, Ren Zhijun, Lu Guangzu, Song Ziwei, Zhang Sijie, Xu Yiming, Cai Ruiqin, Shi Yuqi, Cai Yun, Pan Tianchen
- Female players: Wang Shixian, Shao Jiahui, Bian Bilian, Xong Mengjing, Cheng Shu, He Bingjiao, Dong Yourong, Gao Fang Jie

Zhejiang Jingti Badminton Club

- Male players: Wang Yilyu, Sang Yang, Guo Kai, Huang Yuxiang, Wang Sijie, Zhuge Lukai, Ye Binghong, Lin Guipu, Zhou Haodong, Dong Weijie
- Female players: Qiao Lingzi, Jin Beibei, Xu Yingchao, Pan Lu, Huang Yaqiong, Du Peng, Shao Jingjing, Wang Xinyuan, Chen Yufei, Lin Yinan

Guangxi Hande Badminton Club

- Male players: Wang Yizheng, Mo Mingming, Cheng Chenlin, Huang Yi, Liang Heng, Sun Xiaowen, Wei Gaowang, Chen Shufan
- Female players: Lu Lu, Yang Peiji, Huang Mengmiao, Chen Xiaoxin, Dong Wenjing, Liu Yanling, Lu Yanfei, Chen Jiayuan

Liaoning Badminton Club

- Male players: Gao Huan, Lu Kai, Guo Kaiyi, Li Junhui, Wang Zhenxing, Chen Mingyu, Liu Yuchen, Yang Fan
- Female players: Zhang Yeji, Xie Yang, Du Jing, Diao Zhe, Yu Yang, Qu Kangyilan, Sun Yihui, Sung Ji-Hyun

Hunan Jiangwan Badminton Club

- Male players: Chai Biao, Zhang Wen, Zhou Zeqi, Lin Yuanrui, Chen Zhuofu, Hu Kaizheng, Wang Ning, Son Wan-Ho
- Female players: Tian Qing, Bao Yixin, Chen Xiaojia, Xia Huan, Zeng Xi, Jia Yifan, Xie Siyu, Chen Huilin, Zhu Conglin, Peng Qin

Qingdao Hezhan Renzhou Badminton Club

- Male players: Qiu Zihan, Li Qi, Shen Ye, Dou Yaowei, Qiao Bin, Liu Xiaolong
- Female players: Ma Jin, Luo Ying, Luo Yu, Ratchanok Intanon, Hui Xirui

Guangzhou Yueyu Badminton Club

- Male players: Wang Zhengming, Li Yisheng, Lin Dehao, Tang Junxian, Chen Guangfeng, Song Ransheng
- Female players: Deng Xuan, Zhong Qianxin, Ou Dongni, Mei Qili, Xiao Ting, Zhou Haiyan, Sun Yu, Chen Yingying

Xiamen Defang Badminton Club

- Male players: Yang Chen, Chen Long, Hong Wei, Zhou Zhe, Zhang Lingjun, Qin Chenlin, Liu Cheng, Zhang Yuxiang, Hu Chengfe, Lu Kai
- Female players: Wang Xiaoli, Lin Minying, Mai Yiwen, Shao Yifei, Deng Chen, Liu Yuanyuan, Qiu Feng, Yao Xue, Tang Yuanting, Zhao Yunlei

Bayi Badminton Club

- Male players: Lin Dan, Gao Tianyu, Zhao Junpeng, Wang Tianyang, Zhou Yujie, Luo Cheng, Ju Fangpengyu, Wu Xin, Tang Jincheng
- Female players: Li Xuerui, Wang Xin, Song Yuan, Zheng Yu, Qin Jinjing, Xiong Rui, Shen Yaying, Xiao Jia

The 12 teams were divided by drawing of lots into the Red and the Blue Divisions.

In the Red group were: Guangdong Century City, Jiangsu Wande Recreation, Hunan Jiangwan Group, Guangdong Club, Liaoning Yixing, and Guangxi Hande.

In the Blue group were: Xiamen Defang, Guangzhou Yueyu, Zhejiang Jinti, Bayi, Qingdao Hezhan Renzhou, and Sichuan Jinli Zhiye.

The preliminary group competition was from 27 December 2014 till 2 February 2015, the knockout stage and playoffs commenced from 13 June till 29 June 2015. The Semi-final matches were played between Xiamen DeFang and GuangDong Century City and between Qingdao and Hunan. Eventually the XIAMEN Team became champion by beating the Qingdao team in the Final ties.

== 2015–16 season ==
In the 2015–16 season the format changed back to the normal Sudirman Cup format and only eight teams participated. Also the score in each match was back to best of three games and the 21 point system. The Final was scheduled for 31 January 2016, on a Sunday. Total prize money for this edition amounted to RMB 11.4 million. The Champion took RMB 4 million.

The composition of the players from each of the eight participating teams in the 2015–16 China Badminton Super League are shown below:

Guangdong Century City Badminton Club

- Male players: Xue Song, Ren Xiangyu, Lei Lanxi, Liao Junwei, Zhang Zhijun, Wang Zekang, Yang Zhen, Li Zhe, Zeng Yuedong, Wang Zheng
- Female players: Sun Yu, Chen Qingchen, Xu Ya, Hu Yuxiang, Chen Fanghui, Xiao Yao, Wei Wanqiu, Zhou Ke

JiangSu Nantong Sanjiang Badminton Club

- Male players: Cai Yun, Xu Chen, Kang Jun, Shi Yuqi, Ren Zhijun, Lu Guangzu, Song Ziwei, Zhang Sijie, Xu Yiming, Cai Ruiqin
- Female players: Wang Shixian, Shao Jiahui, Bian Bilian, Xiong Mengjing, Cheng Shu, He Bingjiao, Dong Yourong, Gao Fang Jie, Wang Zixian, Yu Yue

Zhejiang Jingti Badminton Club

- Male players: Guo Kai, Huang Yuxiang, Wang Sijie, Lin Guipu, Zheng Siwei, Jin Jiaxiang, Dong Weijie, Tao Jianqi
- Female players: Chen Yufei, Ling Ziqiao, Jin Beibei, Pan Lu, Huang Yaqiong, Du Peng, Shao Jingjing, Wang Xinyuan

Benxi Zhihui Shanshui Cheng Badminton Club

- Male players: Gao Huan, Liu Kai, Guo Kaiyi, Li Junhui, Wang Zhenxing, Liu Yuchen, Zhang Weiyi, Sun Zhanming
- Female players: Yu Yang, Tang Jinhua, Zhang Yeji, Xie Yang, Guan Shiqi, Zheng Yuwen, An Yu, Wang Siyi

Hunan Jiangwan Group Badminton Club

- Male players: Chai Biao, Zhang Wen, Zhou Zeqi, Lin Yuanrui, Chen Zhuofu, Tan Zhendong, Fan Qiuyue, Ma Lin, Jiang Zhen
- Female players: Tian Qing, Xia Huan, Jia Yifan, Huang Dongping, Chen Huilin, Zhu Conglin, Peng Qin, Zhou Meng, Liu Xuanxuan, Tai Tzu-ying

Qingdao Capital Airlines Badminton Club

- Male players: Lin Dan, Qiu Zihan, Xie Binyu, Yoo Yeon-Seong, Qiao Bin, Liu Xiaolong, Dou Yaowei, Lu Kai
- Female players: Li Xuerui, Ma Jin, Luo Ying, Luo Yu, Lu Yongbei, Zhang Rui, Ren Wenxin, Hui Xirui

Guangdong Qiao Xing Group Badminton Club

- Male players: Wang Zhengming, Wang Yilyu, Zhuge Lukai, Zhou Ligang, Zeng Weiwang, Lin Kaifeng, Zheng Yumin, Song Ransheng, Lee Yong-Dae, Ko Sung-Hyun
- Female players: Zhong Qianxin, Ou Dongni, Zheng Xuhui, Zheng Yu, Chen Lu, Zhou Chaomin, Li Yun, Feng Xueying, Chen Xiaofei, Wu Jiayin

Xiamen Defang Badminton Club

- Male players: Zhang Nan, Huang Kaixiang, Liu Cheng, Tian Houwei, Yang Chen, Chen Long, Hong Wei, Qin Chenlin, Lin Mingjie, Zhang Yuxiang
- Female players: Zhao Yunlei, Wang Yihan, Tang Yuanting, Bao Yixin, Yao Xue, Lin Minying, Mai Yiwen, Shao Yifei, Liu Yuanyuan, Pan Qiuyu

After the completion of the 14 round-robin home and away matches, the top four teams that emerged were 1st Xiamen, 2nd Qingdao, 3rd Hunan, and 4th Zhejiang. These four teams played the semifinals. After 14 rounds and 56 matches played in the round robin stage, the results were:

- 1st Xiamen Defang
- 2nd Qingdao Capital Airline (Shoudu Hangkong)
- 3rd Hunan Jiangwan Group
- 4th Zhejiang Jinti
- 5th Guangdong Qiaoxin Group
- 6th Jiangsu Nantong Sanjiang
- 7th Guangdong Century City (Shiji Cheng)
- 8th Benxi Zhihui Shuicheng

The draw of the semifinal match fixtures was as follows: On 29 January 2016, Friday - Xiamen Defang versus Hunan Jiangwan Group On 30 January 2016, Saturday - Qingdao Capital Airline versus Zhejiang Jiangwan Group

In the first semifinal on 29 January 2016, Hunan Jiangwan Group upset the favorite Xiamen Defang team with a 3:0 defeat. In the other semifinal played on 30 January 2016, Qingdao Capital Airline edged out Zhejiang Jinti 3:2 to earn themselves a place in the final for a shot at the RMB 4 million prize money. In the 3rd place playoff on January 31, 2016, Xiamen Defang suffered another setback losing the bronze medal to Zhejiang Jinti 0:3

On January 31, 2016 at the end of the 2015–16 season of the China Badminton Club Super League, the finals were held in the Jinjiang Zuchang Stadium. The Qingdao Capital Airlines team won with a total score of 3:1 victory over the Hunan Jiangwan team to take the 2015–16 Champions League trophy and the RMB 4 million prize money.

== 2016–17 season ==
The 2016–17 edition of the CBSL runs from 6 December 2016 until 14 January 2017 for the preliminary stage. The playoff for the top four teams will take place later in 2017.

The CBSL is now one of the high-end professional leagues in China among the different sports. It is organized by the China National Table Tennis and Badminton Centre and the Chinese Badminton Association (CBA). In the 2016–17 season a total of eight teams representing some of the established professional clubs across China were participating.

Similar to the previous edition in 2015–16, the eight teams played home and away round-robin matches in each tie comprising Men's Singles, Women's Singles, Men's Doubles, Women's Doubles and Mixed Doubles in the preliminaries from which the top four teams emerged to the play-off knockout stage to determine the top four positions, while the rest were placed from 5th to 8th based on their preliminary rounds results.

For the preliminaries, all five matches were played, however, in the playoffs, to make it more interesting and keep the outcome in suspense, the order of play was rotated randomly. The matches were played again to the normal best of three games to 21 points.

As none of the teams was relegated (demoted) in the previous edition, the same eight teams as in the 2015–16 season were fielded, namely, Xiamen Defang, Liaoning Zhongrun, Jiangsu An Nier, Zhejiang Jingti, Hunan Hualai, Qingdao Renzhou, Guangzhou Yueyu, Guangdong Shiji Cheng.

The opening round were played on the 6th of December 2016.

The composition of the players from each team in the 2016–17 China Badminton Super League are shown below;

Qingdao Renzhou Badminton Club

- Male players: Chen Long, Zhang Nan, Qiu Zihan, Lu Kai, Xue Song, Guo Yuchen, Gao Chengxuan, Chen Bingshun, Chan Peng Soon
- Female players: Luo Ying, Luo Yu, Hui Xirui, Ren Wenxin, E Yan, Liu Zhen, Li Xiaozhen, Wu Liuying, Goh Liu Ying

Hunan Hualai Badminton Club

- Male players: Chai Biao, Zhang Wen, Chen Zhuofu, Zhou Zeqi, Tan Zhendong, Fan Qiuyue, Lin Yuanrui, Ma Lin, Jiang Zhen, Huang Jiawei
- Female players: Tian Qing, Bao Yixin, Jia Yifan, Xia Huan, Dai Zi Ying, Wei Yaxin, Xiao Yue, Zhu Conglin, Peng Qin, Zhou Meng, Liu Xuanxuan, Tai Tzu-Ying

Zhejiang Jingti Badminton Club

- Male players: Zheng Siwei, Wang Sijie, Guo Kai, Lin Guipu, Huang Yuxiang, Ye Binghong, Dong Weijie, Tao Jianqi
- Female players: Huang Yaqiong, Chen Yufei, Du Peng, Ling Ziqiao, Jin Beibei, Xu Yingchao, Shao Jingjing, Ni Bowen

Xiamen Defang Badminton Club

- Male players: Hong Wei, Liu Cheng, Liu Xiaolong, Tian Houwei, Huang Kaixiang, He Jiting, Weng Hongyang, Luo Wangshan, Yu Dengxiang
- Female players: Wang Yihan, Tang Yuanting, Huang Dongping, Li Yinhui, He Bingjiao, Fan Mengyan, Mai Yiwen, Liu Yuanyuan, Pan Qiuyu

Guangzhou Heyuan Nong Shang Yinhang (Yueyu) Badminton Club

- Male players: Lin Dan, Wang Zhengming, Zhuge Lukai, Zhang Zhijun, Zhou Haodong, Ren Pengbo, Je Fangpengyu, Song Ransheng, Lee Yong-Dae, Shin Baek-Cheol
- Female players: Zhong Qianxin, Ou Dongni, Ma Jin, Zheng Yu, Yang Xiaoyu, Wu Yingshi, Fu Xue, Li Yun, Feng Xueying, Chen Xiaofei

Jiangsu An Nier Badminton Club

- Male players: Cai Yun, Xu Chen, Kang Jun, Shi Yuqi, Lu Guangzu, Song Ziwei, Zhang Sijie, Xu Yiming, Cai Ruiqin
- Female players: Cheng Shu, Tang Jinhua, Sun Xiaoli, Wang Shixian, Gao Fangjie, Dong Yourong, Wang Xinwen, Guo Yuxin, Wang Zixian, Xia Yuting

Guangdong Shiji Cheng Century City Badminton Club

- Male players: Fu Haifeng, Liu Yuchen, Wang Yilyu, Qiao Bin, Ren Xiangyu, Son Wan-Ho, Lei Lanxi, Zeng Yuedong, Li Zhe
- Female players: Chen Qingchen, Sun Yu, Yu Xiaohan, Hu Yuxiang, Xiao Yao, Wei Wanqiu, Chen Fanghui, Luo Yuxin

Liaoning Zhongrun Badminton Club

- Male players: Li Junhui, Wang Zekang, Guo Kaiyi, Gao Huan, Wang Zhenxing, Zhou Wenlong, Zhang Weiyi, Sun Zhanming, Tian Mingdao
- Female players: Wang Xiaoli, An Yu, Zhao Wendi, Qu Ran, Xie Yang, Zheng Yuwen, Wang Siyi, Sung Ji-Hyun
