= Eliteserien (disambiguation) =

Eliteserien (literally, "The Elite League") is top-division men's football league in Norway.

Eliteserien may also refer to:

- GET-ligaen, the highest icehockey league
- Eliteserien (men's handball), the highest handball league for men
- Eliteserien (women's handball), the highest handball league for women
- Norwegian Futsal Premier League, the highest futsal league
- the Norwegian Bandy Premier League, the highest bandy league
- Eliteserien i volleyball, the highest volleyball league
- The former name of Toppserien, the highest football league for women
- The former name of AL-Bank Ligaen, the top-division ice hockey league in Denmark.

== See also ==
- Elitserien (disambiguation)
- The dictionary definition of elite at Wiktionary
- The dictionary definition of serien at Wiktionary
