= League (non-profit) =

Nonprofit, school and web-based program

The LEAGUE (officially Community League) is a nonprofit, school and web-based program for service learning. The organization was founded in 2005 and as of July 2008, 189 schools, representing 1,833 classes and 110,535 students in 21 states nationwide were actively participating in The LEAGUE. The organization is headquartered in Newark, NJ, with offices in New York, Detroit, Indianapolis and Austin. The LEAGUE is a 501 3 public charity.

The mission of The LEAGUE states: The LEAGUE is a school and web-based program for schools that builds character and empowers young people to "do good" in their community, the nation, and the world.

In the program, youth participate in service throughout the school year. The LEAGUE offers educator resources online to prepare students in the classroom for service in the community. The LEAGUE provides access to more than 1,300 K-12 classroom lessons on philanthropy, service-learning and character education. All lessons are coded to and searchable by each state's core academic standards. Students demonstrate what they’ve learned by engaging in community service projects, called LEAGUE Events. Young people choose and develop the projects that they want to engage in. The LEAGUE is youth-led. Classes and students earn points for thoughtful civic engagement in the various LEAGUE events.

== History ==
The LEAGUE was founded in 2005 by a group of business, education, government, media and non-profit leaders who created a model for developing the next generation of philanthropists.

In early November 2007, The LEAGUE launched nationwide with corporate and media partners to invite all schools to participate in service of their community, the nation, and the world. The national launch was help in Fall 200 and at Midtown West School in Manhattan (PS 212) with a keynote address by U.S. Secretary of Education, Margaret Spellings and special guests Melinda Doolittle singer, and Harlem Globetrotter Eugene Edgerson.

In June 2010, The LEAGUE merged with HandsOn/Points of Light Foundation in their youth-based generationOn program

== Accomplishments ==
As of July 2008, 189 schools, representing 1,833 classes and 110,535 students in 21 states nationwide were actively participating in The LEAGUE.

According to GenerationOn's official site, the LEAGUE partners with Learning to Give, and is supported by the Hasbro Children's Fund.
