= League =

League or The League may refer to:

== Arts and entertainment ==
- Leagues (band), an American rock band
- The League, an American sitcom broadcast on FX and FXX about fantasy football
- League of Legends, a 2009 multiplayer online battle arena video game, often called "League"

== Sports ==
- Sports league
- Rugby league, full contact football code, often referred to as just "league"

== Other uses ==
- League (unit), traditional unit of length of three miles (4.8 kilometers) or an hour's walk
- League (non-profit), a program for service learning
- The League (app), a dating app

== See also ==
- Alliance among people, groups, or states that have joined together for mutual benefit or to achieve some common purpose.
- The Catholic League of France, or Catholic League (French), an association of pro-Catholic interests in France, active circa 1575-1600
- Lega (political party), a political party in Italy
- Confederation, a union of sovereign groups or states united for common action
- Republic
- Commonwealth
