= Superliga =

Superliga (super league) may refer to:

== Sports ==
Superliga can refer to different sports leagues:

=== Association football ===
- Albanian Superliga, the Albanian top-flight men's division
- Argentine Superliga, the Argentine top-flight men's division
- Danish Superliga, the Danish top-flight men's division
- Liga Super Indonesia, Indonesian top-flight division
- Football Superleague of Kosovo, the Kosovar top-flight men's division
- Malaysia Super League, the Malaysian top-flight men's division
- Moldovan Super Liga, the Moldovan top-flight men's division
- North American SuperLiga, a tournament among top North American clubs
- Primeira Liga, the current name for Portuguese SuperLiga, the Portuguese top-flight men's division
- Romanian Superliga, the Romanian top level league
- Romanian Superliga (women's football), the Romanian top level league for women
- Serbian Superliga, the Serbian top-flight men's division
- Slovak Superliga, the Slovak top-flight men's division
- Superliga Colombiana, Colombian official tournament between Apertura and Finalización champions
- Superliga Femenina, the Spanish top-flight women's division
- Süper Lig, the Turkish top-flight men's division
- Super Liga Timorense, the East Timor top-flight division

=== Volleyball ===
- Superliga Brasileira de Voleibol, Brazilian men's and women's top-flight volleyball division
- Superliga de Voleibol Masculina, the Spanish men's volleyball top league
- Superliga Femenina de Voleibol, the Spanish women's volleyball top league
- Philippine Super Liga, Filipino men's and women's volleyball league

=== Other sports ===
- Polish Superliga, Polish men's top-flight handball league
- Romanian Superliga, the Romanian top-flight men's water polo division
- Russian Hockey Super League, Russian top-flight ice hockey division
- Swedish Super League, Swedish men's top floorball league
- Swedish Super League, Swedish women's top floorball league
- Ukraine Rugby Superliga, Ukrainian top-flight men's rugby division
- SuperLiga (rugby), Romanian top-flight men's rugby division

== Other uses ==
- "Superliga" (song), by Danish rock band Nephew

== See also ==
- Liga (disambiguation)
- Super League (disambiguation)
