= Euro league (disambiguation) =

EuroLeague is a professional men's basketball league

EuroLeague or Euro league may also refer to:

- EuroLeague Women, professional women's basketball league
- Euroleague for Life Sciences (ELLS) association of European universities in the area of life sciences
- Euro Hockey League (field hockey)
- European Hockey League (ice hockey)
- Euro Beach Soccer League
- Euro League (arcade game) (Association football)

== See also ==
- European league (disambiguation)
- UEFA Europa League (association football)
- FIBA Europe League (basketball)
- NFL Europe League (gridiron football)
