= Eleonora Lo Bianco =

Italian volleyball player (born 1979)

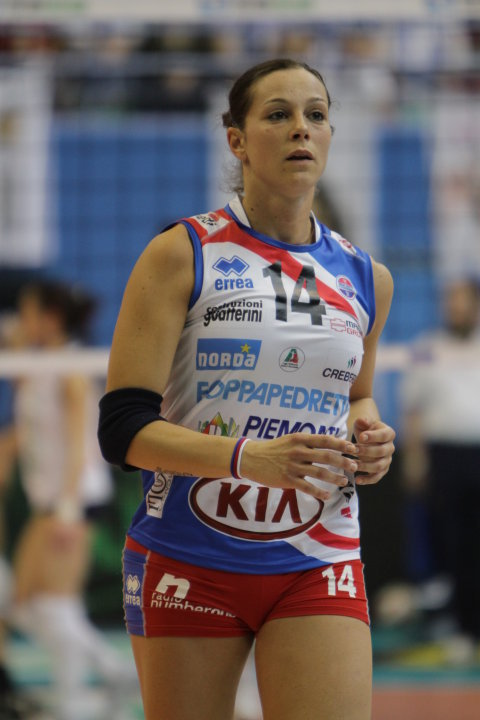

Personal information
- Nationality: Italian
- Born: 22 December 1979 (age 46); Borgomanero, Italy
- Height: 1.72 m (5 ft 8 in)
- Weight: 70 kg (154 lb)
- Spike: 300 cm (118 in)
- Block: 295 cm (116 in)

Volleyball information
- Position: Setter

National team
1998—2016	Italy
Medal record
Women's volleyball
Representing Italy
World Championship
Gold medal – first place	2002 Germany	Team
World Cup
Gold medal – first place	2007 Japan	Team
Gold medal – first place	2011 Japan	Team
World Grand Champions Cup
Gold medal – first place	2009 Japan	Team
FIVB World Grand Prix
Silver medal – second place	2004 Reggio Calabria	Team
Silver medal – second place	2005 Sendai	Team
Bronze medal – third place	2006 Reggio Calabria	Team
Bronze medal – third place	2007 Ningbo	Team
Bronze medal – third place	2008 Yokohama	Team
Bronze medal – third place	2010 Ningbo	Team
European Championship
Gold medal – first place	2007 Belgium/Luxembourg	Team
Gold medal – first place	2009 Poland	Team
Silver medal – second place	2001 Bulgaria	Team
Silver medal – second place	2005 Croatia	Team
Bronze medal – third place	1999 Italy	Team
Mediterranean Games
Gold medal – first place	2001 Tunis	Team
Gold medal – first place	2009 Pescara	Team
World U20 Championship
Silver medal – second place	1997 Poland	Under-20
European Junior Championship
Gold medal – first place	1996 Turkey	Under-19
- Last updated: August 2016

Eleonora Lo Bianco (born 22 December 1979) is a former Italian volleyball player.

== Career ==
Born in Borgomanero, in her youth she played in the Omegna volleyball team. In the season 1998/1999 she was recruited to the Club Italia, a special team organized by the Italian volleyball Federation to train young players.

After that experience she played for several teams in the Italian woman Volleyball League. She is 172 cm tall and weighs 70 kg.

Lo Bianco played with her national team at the 2014 World Championship. There her team ended up in fourth place after losing 2–3 to Brazil the bronze medal match.

== Clubs ==
- (Italy) Pallavolo Omegna (1994–1995)
- (Italy) Eme Pallavolo Omegna (1995–1998)
- (Italy) Club Italia (1998–1999)
- (Italy) Brums Busto Arsizio (1999–2000)
- (Italy) Mirabilandia Teodora Ravenna (2000–2002)
- (Italy) Monte Schiavo Banca Marche Jesi (2002–2005)
- (Italy) Foppapedretti Bergamo (2005–2011)
- (Turkey) Galatasaray Medical Park (2011–2014)
- (Turkey) Fenerbahçe (2014-2015)
- (Italy) Volley Bergamo (2015–2017)
- (Italy) Pomi Casalmaggiore (2017–2018)

== Awards ==
=== Individual ===
- 2005 European Championship "Best Setter"
- 2006 FIVB World Grand Prix "Best Setter"
- 2006–07 CEV Champions League "Best Setter"
- 2009 European Championships "Best Setter"
- 2009–10 CEV Indesit Champions League Final Four "Best Setter"

=== National team ===
- World Championship Germany 2002
- European Champion Belgium/Luxembourg 2007
- World Cup Japan 2007.
- European Champion Poland 2009
- World Cup Japan 2011.

=== Club ===
- 2003 Italian Cup— Runner-up, with Vini Monteschiavo Jesi
- 2005 Italian Supercup— Runner-Up, with Volley Bergamo
- 2005 Italian Cup— Runner-Up, with Volley Bergamo
- 2005–06 Women's CEV Champions League— Bronze medal, with Volley Bergamo
- 2005–06 Italian Championship - Champion, with Radio 105 Foppapedretti
- 2006 Italian Cup - Champion, with Radio 105 Foppapedretti
- 2006–07 CEV Indesit Champions League - Champion, with Radio 105 Foppapedretti
- 2008 Italian Cup - Champion, with Foppapedretti
- 2008 Italian Supercup— Runner-Up, with Volley Bergamo
- 2008–09 CEV Indesit Champions League - Champion, with Foppapedretti Bergamo
- 2009–10 CEV Indesit Champions League - Champion, with Foppapedretti Bergamo
- 2010–11 Italian Championship - Champions, with Volley Bergamo
- 2011-12 Turkish Women's Volleyball Cup - Runner-up, with Galatasaray Daikin
- 2011-12 CEV Cup - Runner-up, with Galatasaray Daikin
- 2012 Turkish Volleyball Super Cup - Runner-Up, with Galatasaray Daikin
- 2012-2013 Turkish Women's Volleyball Cup - Bronze Medal with Galatasaray Daikin
- 2014-2015 Turkish Volleyball Super Cup - Champion, with Fenerbahçe Grundig
- 2014–15 Turkish Women's Volleyball League - Champion, with Fenerbahçe Grundig

Awards
Preceded by (China) Feng Kun	Best Setter of FIVB World Grand Prix; 2006	Succeeded by (China) Wei Qiuyue
