= Milena Rosner =

Polish volleyball player (born 1980)

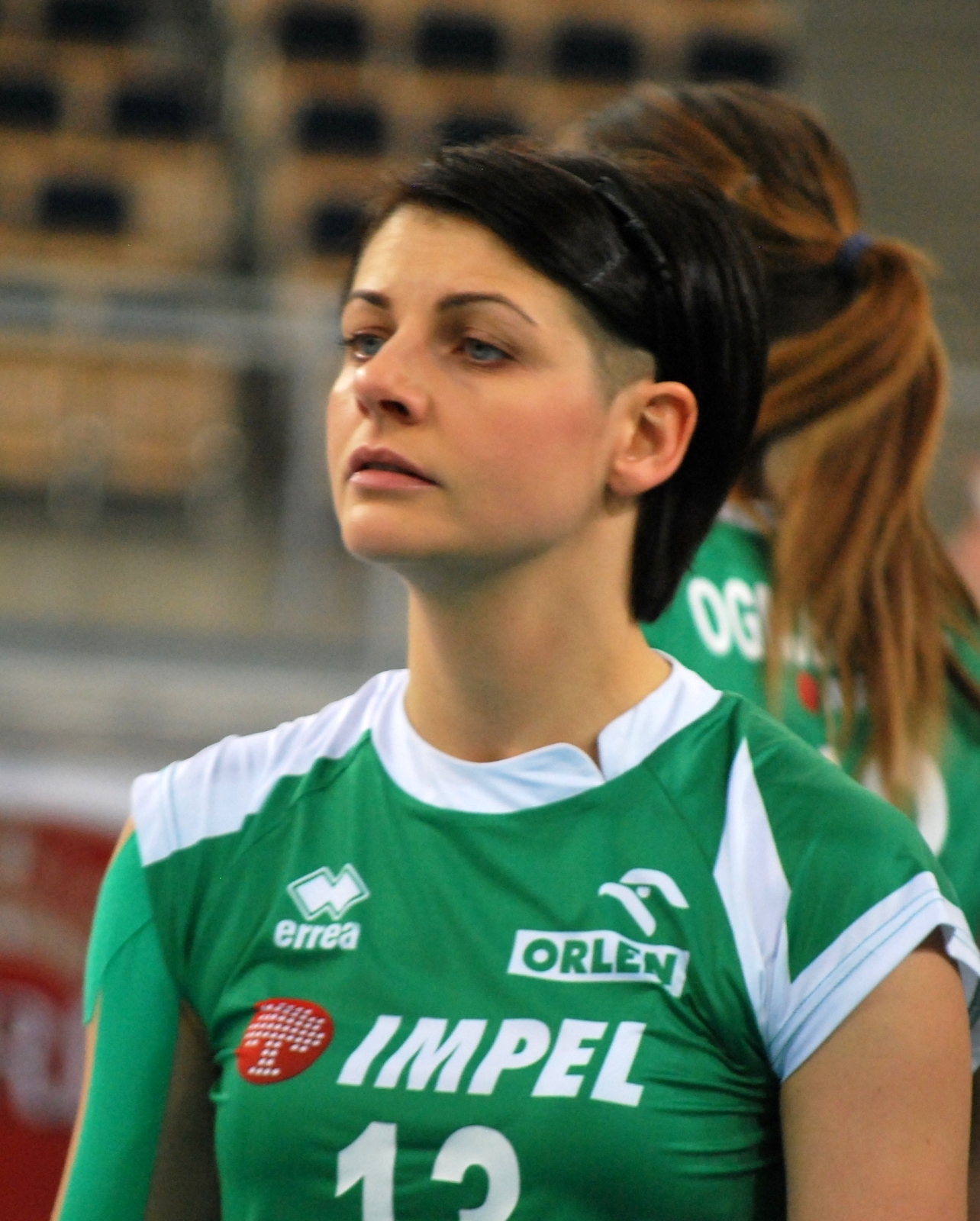

Personal information
- Full name: Milena Maria Rosner
- Nationality: Polish
- Born: January 4, 1980 (age 46); Słupsk, Słupsk Voivodeship, Polish People's Republic
- Height: 1.80 m (5 ft 11 in)
- Weight: 65 kg (143 lb)
- Spike: 307 cm (121 in)
- Block: 292 cm (115 in)

Volleyball information
- Position: Outside hitter/libero
- Number: 13

Career
Years	Teams
1994–1997; 1997–2002; 2002–2005; 2005–2006; 2006–2007; 2007–2008; 2008–2009; 2010–2011; 2011–2013; 2014	(Poland) TPS Czarni Słupsk (Poland) Energa Gedania Gdańsk (Poland) Nafta-Gaz Piła (Poland) Muszynianka Muszyna (Spain) CV Tenerife (Italy) Foppapedretti Bergamo (Poland) Muszynianka Muszyna (Romania) Dinamo București (Poland) Impel Wrocław (Poland) PGE Atom Trefl Sopot
Honours
Representing Poland
Women's volleyball
European Championship
Gold medal – first place	2005 Croatia
- Last updated: 10 June 2015

Milena Rosner (born 4 January 1980) is a Polish volleyball player, a member of Poland women's national volleyball team in 2000–2008, a participant in the Olympic Games Beijing 2008, European Champion 2005, and Polish Champion in 2006 and 2009.

== Personal life ==
In 2010, she gave birth to a son named Milan.

== Career ==
In 2014, Rosner played as second libero in PGE Atom Trefl Sopot.

== Sporting achievements ==
=== Clubs ===
==== CEV Champions League ====
- 2006/2007 - with CV Tenerife

==== National championships ====
- 2002/2003 Polish Cup, with Nafta-Gaz Piła
- 2004/2005 Polish Championship, with Nafta-Gaz Piła
- 2005/2006 Polish Championship, with MKS Muszynianka-Fakro Muszyna
- 2006/2007 Spanish Championship, with CV Tenerife
- 2007/2008 Italian Cup, with Foppapedretti Bergamo
- 2008/2009 Polish Championship, with Bank BPS Muszynianka Fakro Muszyna
- 2010/2011 Romanian Championship, with Dinamo București

=== National team ===
- 2005 CEV European Championship

=== State awards ===
- 2005 Gold Cross of Merit
