= Pieralisi =

Pieralisi is an Italian surname. Notable people with the surname include:

- Alberto Pieralisi (1911–2001), Italian and Brazilian film director
- Giannino Pieralisi, the namesake of the Giannino Pieralisi Volley, Italian volleybal club based in Jesi, Italy.
- Virna Lisa Pieralisi (1936–2014), Italian actress
