= Marco Fenoglio =

Italian volleyball coach (born 1970)

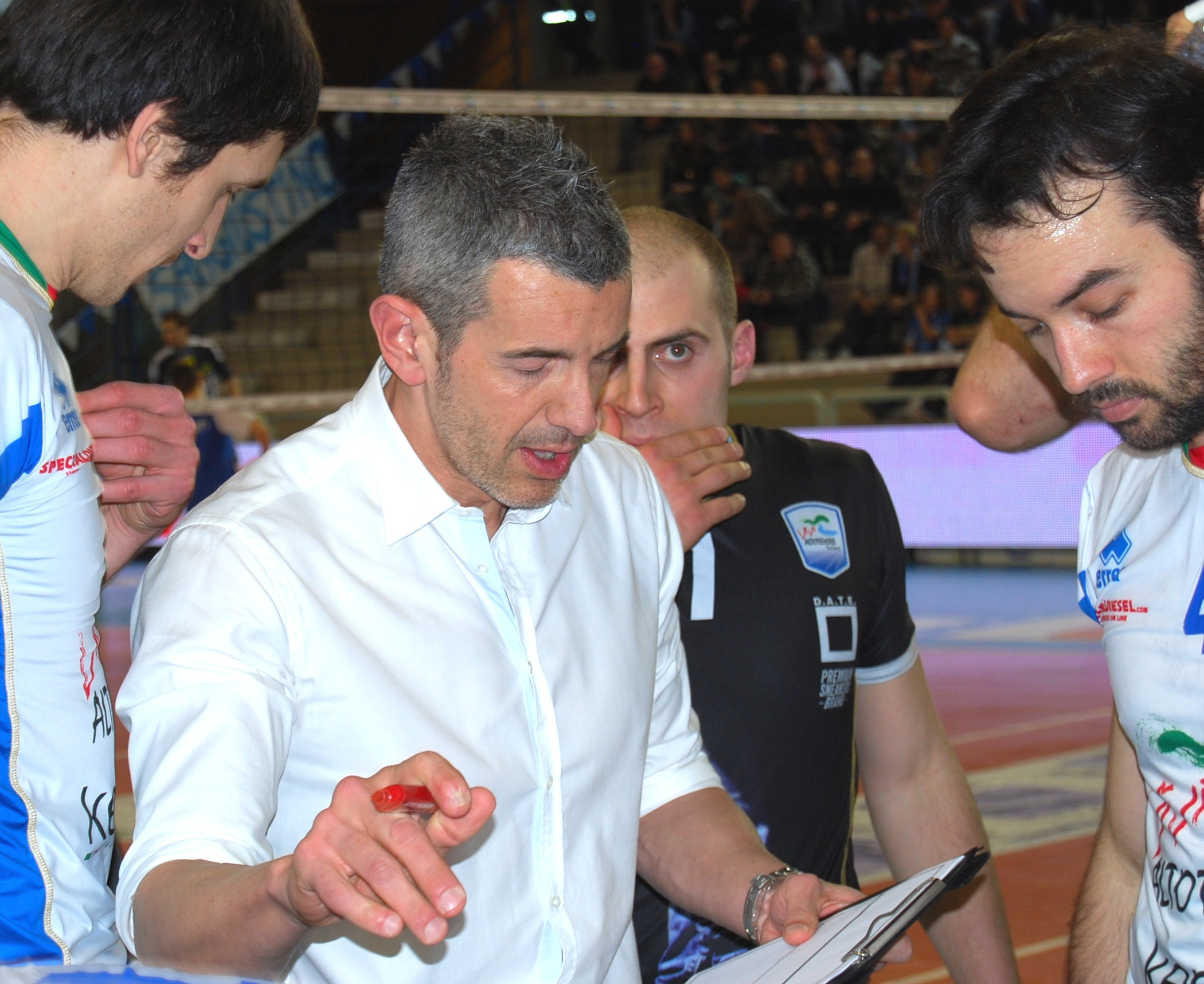
- 2012-13 season with Altotevere Volley

Personal information
- Nationality: Italian
- Born: 16 March 1970 (age 56); Cuneo, Italy

Coaching information
- Current team: Volero le Cannet
Previous teams coached
| Years | Teams |
|---|---|
| 2001-2003; 2003-2005; 2005-2007; 2007-2008; 2008-2010; 2009-2011; 2010-2011; 2011-2012; 2012-2013; 2013-2014; 2014-2015; 2015-2017; 2017-2018; 2018-2021; 2018-2019; 2019-2020; 2020; 2021-2023; 2023-2024; 2024-2025 | (Italy) Gabeca Pallavolo (men's, assistant) (Italy) Piemonte Volley (men's, assistant) (Italy) Volley Bergamo (women's, head) (Italy) Chieri Torino (women's, head) (Italy) La Fenice Isernia (men's, head); Slovakia (men's, assistant) (Italy) Umbria Volley (men's, assistant) (Italy) Gabeca Pallavolo (men's, assistant) (Italy) Altotevere Volley (men's, head) (Italy) Argos Volley (men's, head) (Germany) VfB Friedrichshafen (men's, assistant) (Italy) AGIL Volley (women's, head) (Italy) River Volley (women's, head); Slovakia (women's, head) (Italy) Volley Mondovì (men's, head) (Italy) Volley Bergamo (women's, head) (Italy) UYBA Volley (women's, head) (Greece) PAOK (women's, head) (Poland) Chemik Police (women's, head) (Turkey) Fenerbahçe (women's, head) |
Honours
Men's volleyball
Representing Slovakia
European Volleyball League
| Gold medal – first place | 2011 Košice, Slovakia |

Marco Fenoglio (born 16 March 1970 in Cuneo) is an Italian women's volleyball coach. He is the current head coach of Volero le Cannet.

== Coaching career ==
He was coached for Gabeca Pallavolo and Piemonte Volley, Volley Bergamo, Chieri Torino, La Fenice Isernia, Umbria Volley, Gabeca Pallavolo, Altotevere Volley, Argos Volley, VfB Friedrichshafen, AGIL Volley, River Volley, Volley Mondovì, UYBA Volley, PAOK and Chemik Police. He currently leads Fenerbahçe.

In Italy, Fenoglio has made double and won the Italian national league and Italian Cup (2005–06) and also won CEV Champions League (2006–07) with Volley Bergamo. He also won 2015-16 Italian national league with AGIL Volley.

He made double in Germany, won German national league and German cup in 2014–15. In his Poland adventure, he made strong start with the team and won Polish super cup, also he won the Poland national league in 2023–24.

== Awards ==
=== Clubs ===
- CEV Champions League: 2006–07
- (Italy) Serie A: 2005–06, 2016–17
- (Italy) Coppa Italia: 2005–06
- (Germany) Bundesliga: 2014–15
- (Germany) German Cup: 2014–15
- (Poland) Polish League: 2023–24
- (Poland) Polish Super Cup: 2023
- (Turkey) Turkish Super Cup: 2024
- (Turkey) Turkish Cup: 2025

=== National team ===
- European Volleyball League: 2011

== Personal life ==
Fenoglio has professeur degree in physical education.
