= VC Universitet-Tekhnolog Belgorod =

Russian volleyball club

Universitet-Tekhnolog
- Full name: Volleyball Club Universitet-Tekhnolog Belgorod
- Short name: University Belgorod
- Nickname: Students
- Founded: 1984
- Dissolved: 2010
- Ground: Sports Palace Cosmos (Capacity: 5,000)
- Chairman: Gennadiy Shipulin
- Website: Club home page

Uniforms
Home	Away

Universitet-Tekhnolog or University of Technology (Russian: Университе́т-Техно́лог) was a Russian women's volleyball club based in Belgorod. The club played in the Super League, the top Russian league until 2009–10.

== Previous names ==
- Teacher (Pedagogue) (1984–1992)
- White Star (1992–1997)
- University (1997–2006)
- University Belgorod (2006–2009)
- University of Technology (2009–2010)

== History ==
The club was established in 1984 as Teacher (Pedagogue in Russian) at the Faculty of Physical Education of the Belgorod М.S.Olminsky State Pedagogical Institute (now Belgorod State University). It played in the lower divisions of the Soviet Championship (until 1990–91) and Russian Championship (from 1991–92). The club changed its name to White Star ahead of the 1992–93 season and played in the second division a season later.

Another name change came in the 1996–97 season when the club became University before its debut at the Super League in the 1997–98 season. The club's results improved year by year and the club recorded strong finishes in the Super League such as second in 2000–01, third in 2001–02, second in 2002–03 and fourth in 2003–04. These results allowed the club to take part in European competitions such as the Top Teams Cup (in 2001–02 and 2003–04) and the CEV Cup (in 2002–03 and 2004–05). From 2004 the results started to decline and the club was relegated at the end of the 2005–06 season.

Ahead of the 2006–07 season, the club moved under Lokomotiv Belgorod structure and was renamed University Belgorod. Results started to improve again, promotion back to the Super league was achieved during that same season. In the following season (2007–08), the club finished sixth place in the Super League. Despite the seventh place finish at the 2008–09 Super League, the club won the 2008 Russian Cup and qualified for the CEV Champions League.

The club moved back under the Belgorod State University structure in 2009 and changed its name to University of Technology. It finish eleventh at the 2009–10 Super League and reached the play-off stages of the 2009–10 CEV Women's Champions League after beating eventual champions Volley Bergamo at the group stage. The club was dissolved at the end of that season.

== Honours ==
=== National competitions ===
- Russian Cup: 1

2008

== Team squad ==
This was the club's last squad, from season 2009–2010

Number	Player	Position	Height (m)	Birth date
1	(Russia) Irina Smirnova	Middle Blocker	1.92	10/04/1990
2	(Russia) Marianna Yazepchik	Setter	1.76	22/04/1987
3	(Russia) Olga Khrzhanovskaya	Setter	1.80	09/06/1980
4	(Russia) Elena Ponomareva	Wing Spiker	1.94	28/12/1972
5	(Russia) Tatiana Shchukina	Middle Blocker	1.92	07/08/1991
7	(Ukraine) Lyubov Yagodina	Wing Spiker	1.84	22/09/1977
8	(Russia) Ekaterina Krivets	Middle Blocker	1.92	14/11/1984
9	(Russia) Ekaterina Orlova	Wing Spiker	1.93	21/10/1987
10	(Russia) Aleksandra Belozerova	Libero	1.77	19/11/1985
11	(Russia) Yekaterina Starodubova	Libero	1.76	19/10/1984
12	(Bulgaria) Diana Nenova	Setter	1.78	16/04/1985
15	(Russia) Natalia Rogacheva	Middle Blocker	1.88	30/12/1982
16	(Serbia) Anja Spasojevic	Wing Spiker	1.87	04/07/1983
17	(Russia) Natalia Kulikova	Wing Spiker	1.85	12/05/1982
18	(Russia) Aleksandra Solomatnikova	Wing Spiker	1.85	27/11/1990
