= Aurora Basket Jesi =

- Leagues: Serie A2
- Founded: 1965
- Arena: UBI BPA Sport Center
- Capacity: 3,500
- Location: Jesi, Marche, Italy
- Team colors: Orange and Blue
- Main sponsor: Fileni
- President: Brunello Felicaldi
- Team manager: Federico Ligi
- Head coach: Maurizio Lasi
- Website: AuroraBasket.it
Home	Away

Aurora Basket Jesi is an Italian professional basketball club based in Jesi. It plays in the second division Serie A2 as of the 2015-16 season.

== History ==
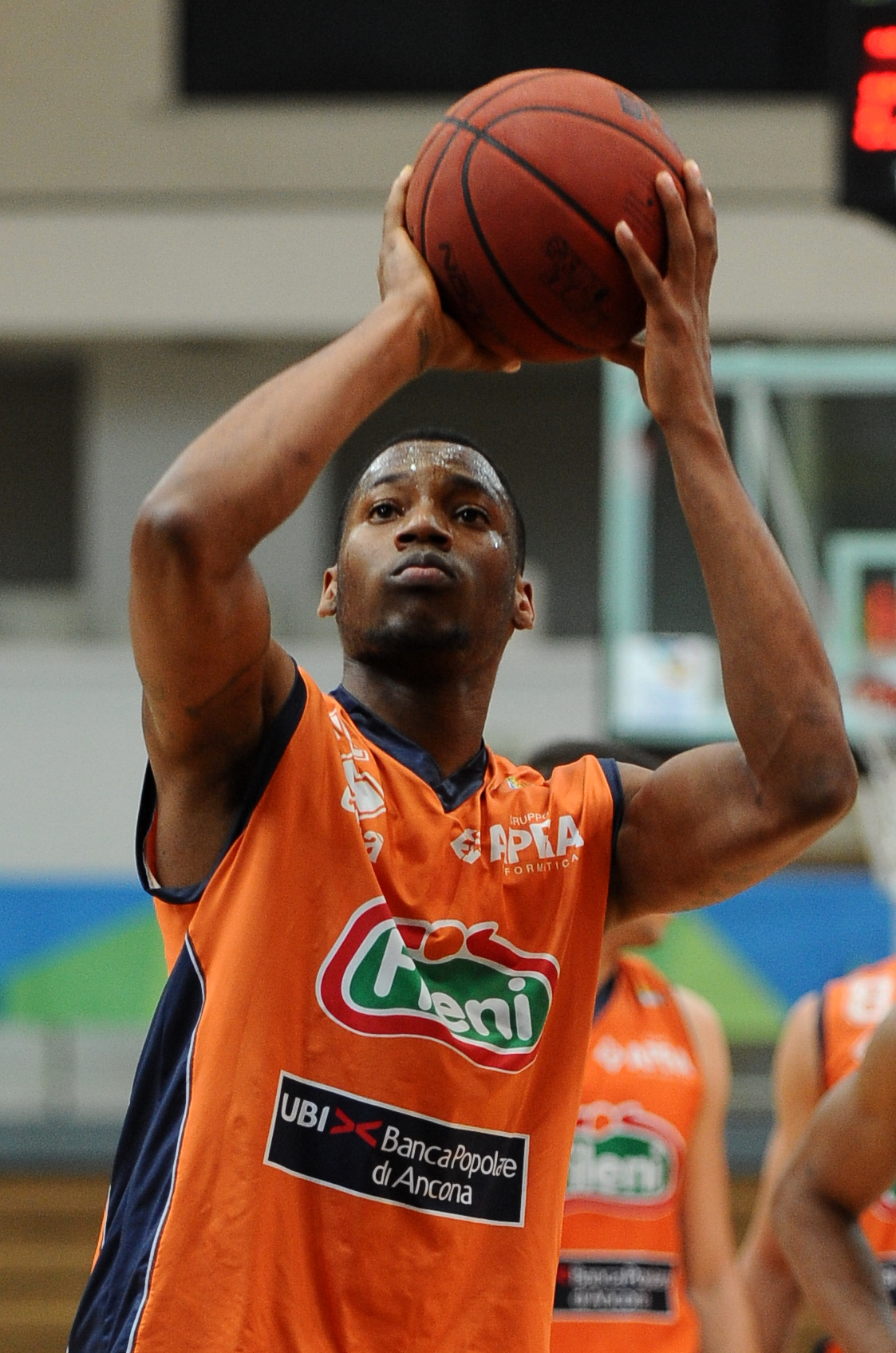
Eric Griffin

In 1965, Gianni Rossetti (a television journalist for RAI), Carlo Barchiesi (current president) and Primo Novelli (then responsible for the club's junior sides) helped form Aurora Basket Jesi along with president Mario Gherardi. At the time, Springoil had been strongest side of Jesi, flirting with a promotion to the top-tier, but it disappeared due to financial difficulties. Roberto Vigo suggested to Gianni Rossetti that a basketball team should be set up within the Aurora Group.

The team started play during the 1965-66 season in the highest regional division. Slowly moving up the divisions, the club moved up to the national Serie D in 1973. Jesi moved up to the Serie C2 after the 1979-80 season, thanks to players such as Giovannini, Carnevali and Castelli from Fabriano and Paccapelo from Lineaerre Team Pesaro. The team reached the Serie C2 playoffs in its first season, the next season it lost in the finals against Basket Barcellona. Jesi would achieve promotion to the Serie C1 after the 1983-84 season, finishing the regular season in second place before winning the promotion playoffs They were relegated from the C1 at the end of their first season, but returned the following year. Later returning to the Serie D, Jesi rejoined the Serie C in 1989-90.

The club reached the second division Serie A2 after the 1996-97 season in which it beat Gaverina Bergamo in the playoff finals in May 1997. The 1999-00 season saw the side reach the Final Eight of the Italian Cup, the 2003-04 season saw a historic promotion to the Serie A.

However, the club struggled in the Serie A, firing coach Luigi Gresta as they were relegated. in 2005, they would recruit coach Luca Banchi and small-forward Romain Sato, reaching the playoffs at the end of the season. The Latini family, major backers, withdrew their sponsorship of a club they had helped for sixteen years at the end of the season. In 2006, the club scrambled to find new financing, ultimately securing backing, with Fileni becoming their main sponsor. A team containing Brion Rush reached the playoffs, losing in the semifinals.

== Arena ==
When it was starting to play in the Serie D, the team used to practice at the Jesi Fencing Club gymnasium and later on in a newly constructed gym in the San Sebastiano area of Prato Road.

The club plays in the UBI BPA Sport Center (capacity:3,500), opened in 1992, as of the 2015-16 season.

== Notable players ==
2000s

- (Italy) Michele Maggioli 13 season: '01-'11 and '14 -'17
- (United States) David Moss 1 season: '07-'08
- (United States) Brion Rush 1 season: '06-'07
- (Central African Republic) Romain Sato 1 season: '05-'06
- (England) Tony Dorsey 1 season: '05-'06
- (Slovenia) Goran Jurak 1 season: '04-'05
- (United States) Cory Violette 1 season: '04-'05
- (Italy) Mario Boni 1 season: '04-'05
- (Italy) Rodolfo Rombaldoni 1 season: '04-'05
- (United States) Jamal Robinson 1 season: '03-'04
- (United States) James Singleton 1 season: '03-'04
- (Italy) Brett Blizzard 1 season: '03-'04
- (United States) Trent Whiting 1 season: '03-'04
- (United States) (Italy) Raymond Tutt 2 seasons: '02-'03, '04-'05
- (United States) Joshua Davis 1 season: '02-'03
- (Italy) Mason Rocca 3 seasons: '01-'04
- (United States) (Italy) Michael Williams 1 season: '01-'02
- (United States) Bakari Hendrix 1 season: '01-'02
- (United States) Myron Brown 1 season: '01-'02
- (United States) Roy Rogers 1 season: '01-'02
- (Croatia) Damir Tvrdic 1 season: '00-'01
- (Italy) Claudio Pol Bodetto 1 season: '00-'01
- (United States) Walter Berry 1 season: '00-'01
- (Finland) Ville Kaunisto

1990s

- (Argentina) (Italy) Mario Gigena 4 seasons: '99-'03
- (Ukraine) Alexander Lokhmanchuk 1 season: '99-'00
- (United States) Adrian Autry 1 season: '99-'00
- (United States) Raymond Brown 1 season: '98-'99
- (United States) (Portugal) Steve Carney 1 season: '98-'99
- (Bosnia and Herzegovina) (Italy) Gordan Firić 3 seasons: '97-'00
- (United States) Jean Prioleau 2 seasons: '97-'99
- (United States) Anthony Pelle 1 season: '97-'98

== Sponsorship names ==
Throughout the years, due to sponsorship, the club has been known as:

- Sicc Jesi (1992–2006)
- Fileni Jesi (2006–2015)
- Betulline Jesi (2016)
- Termoforgia Jesi (2017-)
