= 2009–10 CEV Women's Champions League =

- League: CEV Women's Champions League
- Sport: Volleyball
- Finals champions: (Italy) Volley Bergamo
- Runners-up: (Turkey) Fenerbahçe Acıbadem
- Finals MVP: (Italy) Francesca Piccinini

CEV Women's Champions League seasons
- ← 2008–09 2010–11 →

The 2009–10 Women's CEV Champions League was an international volleyball club competition for elite clubs throughout Europe.

== Teams of the 2009–10 ==
Participants:

Rank	Country	The number of teams	Teams
1	Italy	3	Scavolini Pesaro; Asystel Novara; Volley Bergamo
2	Russia	3	Zarechie Odintsovo; Dynamo Moscow; Universitet Belgorod
4	France	2	RC Cannes; ASPTT Mulhouse
5	Poland	3	Bank BPS Fakro Muszynianka; Aluprof Bielsko-Biała; ENION Energia MKS Dąbrowa Górnicza
7	Turkey	2	Fenerbahçe Acıbadem; VakıfBank Güneş Sigorta Türk Telekom
9	Croatia	1	ŽOK Rijeka
11	Romania	1	Metal Galaţi
27	Czech Republic	1	Modřanskà Prostějov

== Main phase ==
=== Pool A ===
Pos	Team	Pld	W	L	Pts	SW	SL	SR	SPW	SPL	SPR
1	(France) RC Cannes	6	5	1	11	16	4	4.000	475	377	1.260
2	(Italy) Volley Bergamo	6	4	2	10	14	9	1.556	505	458	1.103
3	(Russia) Universitet Belgorod	6	3	3	9	11	12	0.917	465	488	0.953
4	(Croatia) ŽOK Rijeka	6	0	6	6	2	18	0.111	362	484	0.748

December 1–3, 2009

	Score		Set 1	Set 2	Set 3	Set 4	Set 5
Universitet Belgorod (Russia)	0–3	(France) RC Cannes	21–25	17–25	20–25		
ŽOK Rijeka (Croatia)	0–3	(Italy) Volley Bergamo	16–25	11–25	24–26		

December 8–9, 2009

	Score		Set 1	Set 2	Set 3	Set 4	Set 5
RC Cannes (France)	3–0	(Croatia) ŽOK Rijeka	25–12	25–16	25–20		
Volley Bergamo (Italy)	3–2	(Russia) Universitet Belgorod	18–25	23–25	25–22	25–11	15–5

December 16–17, 2009

	Score		Set 1	Set 2	Set 3	Set 4	Set 5
Universitet Belgorod (Russia)	3–0	(Croatia) ŽOK Rijeka	25–15	25–21	25–11		
RC Cannes (France)	3–1	(Italy) Volley Bergamo	25–19	18–25	25–14	25–7	

January 6–7, 2010

	Score		Set 1	Set 2	Set 3	Set 4	Set 5
Volley Bergamo (Italy)	3–1	(France) RC Cannes	25–10	25–22	18–25	25–20	
ŽOK Rijeka (Croatia)	2–3	(Russia) Universitet Belgorod	18–25	16–25	25–15	25–23	11–15

January 12–13, 2010

	Score		Set 1	Set 2	Set 3	Set 4	Set 5
ŽOK Rijeka (Croatia)	0–3	(France) RC Cannes	22–25	17–25	28–30		
Universitet Belgorod (Russia)	3–1	(Italy) Volley Bergamo	25–22	25–23	20–25	25–20	

January 19, 2010

	Score		Set 1	Set 2	Set 3	Set 4	Set 5
Volley Bergamo (Italy)	3–0	(Croatia) ŽOK Rijeka	25–19	25–18	25–17		
RC Cannes (France)	3–0	(Russia) Universitet Belgorod	25–16	25–17	25–13		

=== Pool B ===
Pos	Team	Pld	W	L	Pts	SW	SL	SR	SPW	SPL	SPR
1	(Italy) Scavolini Pesaro	6	5	1	11	17	5	3.400	498	424	1.175
2	(Turkey) VakıfBank Güneş TTelekom	6	5	1	11	17	6	2.833	531	444	1.196
3	(Poland) ENION Energia Dąbrowa Górnicza	6	2	4	8	6	13	0.462	390	429	0.909
4	(France) ASPTT Mulhouse	6	0	6	6	2	18	0.111	370	492	0.752

December 3, 2009

	Score		Set 1	Set 2	Set 3	Set 4	Set 5
Scavolini Pesaro (Italy)	3–0	(Poland) ENION Energia Dąbrowa Górnicza	25–21	25–12	25–19		
ASPTT Mulhouse (France)	0–3	(Turkey) VakıfBank Güneş TTelekom	24–26	22–25	20–25		

December 8–10, 2009

	Score		Set 1	Set 2	Set 3	Set 4	Set 5
ENION Energia Dąbrowa Górnicza (Poland)	3–0	(France) ASPTT Mulhouse	25–14	25–17	25–23		
VakıfBank Güneş TTelekom (Turkey)	3–2	(Italy) Scavolini Pesaro	22–25	22–25	25–19	25–17	15–13

December 15–17, 2009

	Score		Set 1	Set 2	Set 3	Set 4	Set 5
ENION Energia Dąbrowa Górnicza (Poland)	0–3	(Turkey) VakıfBank Güneş TTelekom	12–25	18–25	16–25		
Scavolini Pesaro (Italy)	3–0	(France) ASPTT Mulhouse	25–13	25–17	25–22		

January 5–6, 2010

	Score		Set 1	Set 2	Set 3	Set 4	Set 5
ASPTT Mulhouse (France)	0–3	(Italy) Scavolini Pesaro	16–25	15–25	18–25		
VakıfBank Güneş TTelekom (Turkey)	3–0	(Poland) ENION Energia Dąbrowa Górnicza	25–22	25–20	25–18		

January 13–14, 2010

	Score		Set 1	Set 2	Set 3	Set 4	Set 5
ASPTT Mulhouse (France)	1–3	(Poland) ENION Energia Dąbrowa Górnicza	14–25	23–25	25–19	13–25	
Scavolini Pesaro (Italy)	3–2	(Turkey) VakıfBank Güneş TTelekom	25–18	25–23	13–25	21–25	15–8

January 19, 2010

	Score		Set 1	Set 2	Set 3	Set 4	Set 5
VakıfBank Güneş TTelekom (Turkey)	3–1	(France) ASPTT Mulhouse	22–25	25–19	25–10	25–20	
ENION Energia Dąbrowa Górnicza (Poland)	0–3	(Italy) Scavolini Pesaro	23–25	21–25	19–25		

=== Pool C ===
Pos	Team	Pld	W	L	Pts	SW	SL	SR	SPW	SPL	SPR
1	(Turkey) Fenerbahçe Acıbadem	6	6	0	12	18	2	9.000	474	390	1.215
2	(Russia) Dynamo Moscow	6	4	2	10	14	11	1.273	556	535	1.039
3	(Czech Republic) Modřanskà Prostějov	6	2	4	8	8	16	0.500	494	541	0.913
4	(Poland) Aluprof Bielsko-Biała	6	0	6	6	7	18	0.389	503	561	0.897

December 1–3, 2009

	Score		Set 1	Set 2	Set 3	Set 4	Set 5
Aluprof Bielsko-Biała (Poland)	2–3	(Russia) Dynamo Moscow	25–20	26–28	25–15	24–26	11–15
Fenerbahçe Acıbadem (Turkey)	3–0	(Czech Republic) Modřanskà Prostějov	25–18	25–11	25–21		

December 9, 2009

	Score		Set 1	Set 2	Set 3	Set 4	Set 5
Dynamo Moscow (Russia)	0–3	(Turkey) Fenerbahçe Acıbadem	23–25	20–25	14–25		
Modřanskà Prostějov (Czech Republic)	3–2	(Poland) Aluprof Bielsko-Biała	18–25	25–18	21–25	27–25	15–10

December 15–17, 2009

	Score		Set 1	Set 2	Set 3	Set 4	Set 5
Modřanskà Prostějov (Czech Republic)	1–3	(Russia) Dynamo Moscow	17–25	20–25	25–19	27–29	
Fenerbahçe Acıbadem (Turkey)	3–0	(Poland) Aluprof Bielsko-Biała	25–22	25–18	25–19		

January 5–6, 2010

	Score		Set 1	Set 2	Set 3	Set 4	Set 5
Aluprof Bielsko-Biała (Poland)	0–3	(Turkey) Fenerbahçe Acıbadem	19–25	21–25	17–25		
Dynamo Moscow (Russia)	3–1	(Czech Republic) Modřanskà Prostějov	27–25	19–25	25–13	25–19	

January 12–14, 2010

	Score		Set 1	Set 2	Set 3	Set 4	Set 5
Aluprof Bielsko-Biała (Poland)	2–3	(Czech Republic) Modřanskà Prostějov	25–20	25–19	22–25	15–25	7–15
Fenerbahçe Acıbadem (Turkey)	3–2	(Russia) Dynamo Moscow	20–25	14–25	25–23	25–18	15–13

January 19, 2010

	Score		Set 1	Set 2	Set 3	Set 4	Set 5
Dynamo Moscow (Russia)	3–1	(Poland) Aluprof Bielsko-Biała	25–17	25–18	22–25	25–19	
Modřanskà Prostějov (Czech Republic)	0–3	(Turkey) Fenerbahçe Acıbadem	20–25	22–25	21–25		

=== Pool D ===
Pos	Team	Pld	W	L	Pts	SW	SL	SR	SPW	SPL	SPR
1	(Italy) Asystel Novara	6	4	2	10	14	9	1.556	496	476	1.042
2	(Poland) Bank BPS Fakro Muszynianka	6	3	3	9	11	9	1.222	444	420	1.057
3	(Russia) Zarechie Odintsovo	6	3	3	9	13	11	1.182	515	509	1.012
4	(Romania) Metal Galaţi	6	2	4	8	6	15	0.400	432	482	0.896

December 1–3, 2009

	Score		Set 1	Set 2	Set 3	Set 4	Set 5
Metal Galaţi (Romania)	3–1	(Poland) Bank BPS Fakro Muszynianka	20–25	25–19	25–22	25–16	
Zarechie Odintsovo (Russia)	2–3	(Italy) Asystel Novara	17–25	27–25	20–25	25–18	10–15

December 10, 2009

	Score		Set 1	Set 2	Set 3	Set 4	Set 5
Asystel Novara (Italy)	3–0	(Romania) Metal Galaţi	25–18	25–18	28–26		
Bank BPS Fakro Muszynianka (Poland)	3–0	(Russia) Zarechie Odintsovo	25–20	25–19	25–22		

December 15–17, 2009

	Score		Set 1	Set 2	Set 3	Set 4	Set 5
Metal Galaţi (Romania)	3–2	(Russia) Zarechie Odintsovo	19–25	18–25	26–24	25–16	15–7
Bank BPS Fakro Muszynianka (Poland)	3–0	(Italy) Asystel Novara	25–15	25–14	25–9		

January 6–7, 2010

	Score		Set 1	Set 2	Set 3	Set 4	Set 5
Asystel Novara (Italy)	3–1	(Poland) Bank BPS Fakro Muszynianka	25–14	23–25	25–14	25–22	
Zarechie Odintsovo (Russia)	3–0	(Romania) Metal Galaţi	25–21	25–20	25–21		

January 13, 2010

	Score		Set 1	Set 2	Set 3	Set 4	Set 5
Zarechie Odintsovo (Russia)	3–0	(Poland) Bank BPS Fakro Muszynianka	25–19	25–21	25–22		
Metal Galaţi (Romania)	0–3	(Italy) Asystel Novara	19–25	20–25	18–25		

January 19, 2010

	Score		Set 1	Set 2	Set 3	Set 4	Set 5
Asystel Novara (Italy)	2–3	(Russia) Zarechie Odintsovo	25–20	21–25	19–25	25–23	9–15
Bank BPS Fakro Muszynianka (Poland)	3–0	(Romania) Metal Galaţi	25–17	25–21	25–15		

== Play-off 12 ==
Team 1	Agg.	Team 2	1st leg	2nd leg
VakıfBank Güneş TTelekom (Turkey)	6–0	(Russia) Universitet Belgorod	3–0	3–0
ENION Energia Dąbrowa Górnicza (Poland)	2–6	(Italy) Asystel Novara	2–3	0–3
Dynamo Moscow (Russia)	3–4	(Russia) Zarechie Odintsovo	0–3	3–1
Metal Galaţi (Romania)	0–6	(Turkey) Fenerbahçe Acıbadem	0–3	0–3
Volley Bergamo (Italy)	5–3	(Poland) Bank BPS Fakro Muszynianka	3–0	2–3
Modřanskà Prostějov (Czech Republic)	1–6	(Italy) Scavolini Pesaro	1–3	0–3

=== First leg ===
February 9–11, 2010

	Score		Set 1	Set 2	Set 3	Set 4	Set 5
VakıfBank Güneş TTelekom (Turkey)	3–0	(Russia) Universitet Belgorod	25–12	25–17	25–16		
ENION Energia Dąbrowa Górnicza (Poland)	2–3	(Italy) Asystel Novara	22–25	18–25	27–25	25–23	13–15
Dynamo Moscow (Russia)	0–3	(Russia) Zarechie Odintsovo	20–25	17–25	19–25		
Metal Galaţi (Romania)	0–3	(Turkey) Fenerbahçe Acıbadem	21–25	23–25	15–25		
Volley Bergamo (Italy)	3–0	(Poland) Bank BPS Fakro Muszynianka	25–20	25–23	25–21		
Modřanskà Prostějov (Czech Republic)	1–3	(Italy) Scavolini Pesaro	28–30	25–19	22–25	24–26	

=== Second leg ===
February 16–18, 2010

	Score		Set 1	Set 2	Set 3	Set 4	Set 5
Universitet Belgorod (Russia)	0–3	(Turkey) VakıfBank Güneş TTelekom	17–25	16–25	19–25		
Asystel Novara (Italy)	3–0	(Poland) ENION Energia Dąbrowa Górnicza	25–18	25–17	25–20		
Zarechie Odintsovo (Russia)	1–3	(Russia) Dynamo Moscow	25–20	26–28	22–25	20–25	
Fenerbahçe Acıbadem (Turkey)	3–0	(Romania) Metal Galaţi	25–15	27–25	25–20		
Bank BPS Fakro Muszynianka (Poland)	3–2	(Italy) Volley Bergamo	21–25	16–25	25–21	25–21	15–8
Scavolini Pesaro (Italy)	3–0	(Czech Republic) Modřanskà Prostějov	25–18	25–18	25–20		

== Play-off 6 ==
Team 1	Agg.	Team 2	1st leg	2nd leg
VakıfBank Güneş TTelekom (Turkey)	1–6	(Italy) Asystel Novara	1–3	0-3
Zarechie Odintsovo (Russia)	0–6	(Turkey) Fenerbahçe Acıbadem	0–3	0-3
Volley Bergamo (Italy)	5–4	(Italy) Scavolini Pesaro	2–3	3-1

=== First leg ===
March 2–4, 2010

	Score		Set 1	Set 2	Set 3	Set 4	Set 5
VakıfBank Güneş TTelekom (Turkey)	1–3	(Italy) Asystel Novara	22–25	23–25	27–25	16-25	
Zarechie Odintsovo (Russia)	0–3	(Turkey) Fenerbahçe Acıbadem	20–25	15–25	24–26		
Volley Bergamo (Italy)	2–3	(Italy) Scavolini Pesaro	25–20	25–27	26–24	18–25	12–15

=== Second leg ===
March 10–11, 2010

	Score		Set 1	Set 2	Set 3	Set 4	Set 5
Asystel Novara (Italy)	3–0	(Turkey) VakıfBank Güneş TTelekom	25–22	25–22	25–23		
Fenerbahçe Acıbadem (Turkey)	3–0	(Russia) Zarechie Odintsovo	25–17	25–22	25–23		
Scavolini Pesaro (Italy)	1–3	(Italy) Volley Bergamo	18–25	22–25	25–20	22–25	

== Final four ==
The 2010 Final Four April 3–4, 2010 were played at Cannes, France.

=== Semi-final ===
April 3, 2010

	Score		Set 1	Set 2	Set 3	Set 4	Set 5
Fenerbahçe Acıbadem (Turkey)	3–2	(France) RC Cannes	18–25	25–19	25–18	17–25	23–21
Asystel Novara (Italy)	1–3	(Italy) Volley Bergamo	20–25	25–21	19–25	15–25	

=== Third place play-off ===
April 4, 2010

	Score		Set 1	Set 2	Set 3	Set 4	Set 5
RC Cannes (France)	3–0	(Italy) Asystel Novara	26–24	25–19	25–18		

=== Final ===
April 4, 2010

	Score		Set 1	Set 2	Set 3	Set 4	Set 5
Fenerbahçe Acıbadem (Turkey)	2–3	(Italy) Volley Bergamo	22–25	21–25	25–22	25–20	9–15

== Final standing ==
Rank	Team
1st place, gold medalist(s)	(Italy) Volley Bergamo
2nd place, silver medalist(s)	(Turkey) Fenerbahçe Acıbadem
3rd place, bronze medalist(s)	(France) RC Cannes
4	(Italy) Asystel Novara

2009–10 Women's Club European Champions

Volley Bergamo
7th title

Roster for Final Four
Serena Ortolani, Caterina Fanzini, Sara Carrara, Christiane Fürst, Enrica Merlo, Lucia Bosetti, Valentina Serena, Francesca Piccinini, Valentina Arrighetti, Eleonora Lo Bianco, Antonella Del Core and Marina Zambelli
Head coach
Lorenzo Micelli

== Awards ==
- MVP: (Italy) Francesca Piccinini (Volley Bergamo)
- Best scorer: (Russia) Yekaterina Gamova (Fenerbahçe Acıbadem)
- Best spiker: (Italy) Nadia Centoni (RC Cannes)
- Best server: (Croatia) Nataša Osmokrović (Fenerbahçe Acıbadem)
- Best blocker: (France) Victoria Ravva (RC Cannes)
- Best receiver: (Italy) Antonella Del Core (Volley Bergamo)
- Best setter: (Italy) Eleonora Lo Bianco (Volley Bergamo)
- Best libero: (Italy) Enrica Merlo (Volley Bergamo)
