= Palatriccoli =

Indoor sporting arena in Jesi, Italy

Coordinates: 43.5217°N 13.2203°E

PalaTriccoli
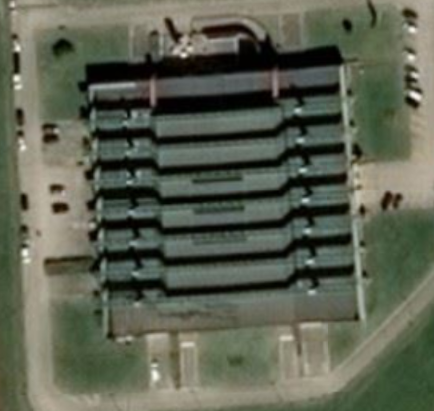
- Interactive map of PalaTriccoli
- Full name: Palazzetto dello sport “Ezio Triccoli”
- Address: Via Tabano; Jesi, Italy
- Capacity: 3,500

Construction
- Opened: 1992

Tenants
- Aurora Basket Jesi (1992–present); Vini Monteschiavo Jesi (2001–2010)

The PalaTriccoli (officially Palazzetto dello sport “Ezio Triccoli”), also known as UBI BPA Sport Center (due to sponsorship reasons), is an indoor sporting arena located in Jesi, Italy.

It was the home venue of women's volleyball club Vini Monteschiavo Jesi during the period it played in the Serie A1 from 2001 to 2010. It is the home venue of basketball club Aurora Basket Jesi since 1992 and has capacity for 3,500 spectators.

In April 2015, the venue was renamed UBI BPA Sport Center after a sponsorship deal was agreed.
