= Jean Prioleau =

American college basketball coach (born 1970)

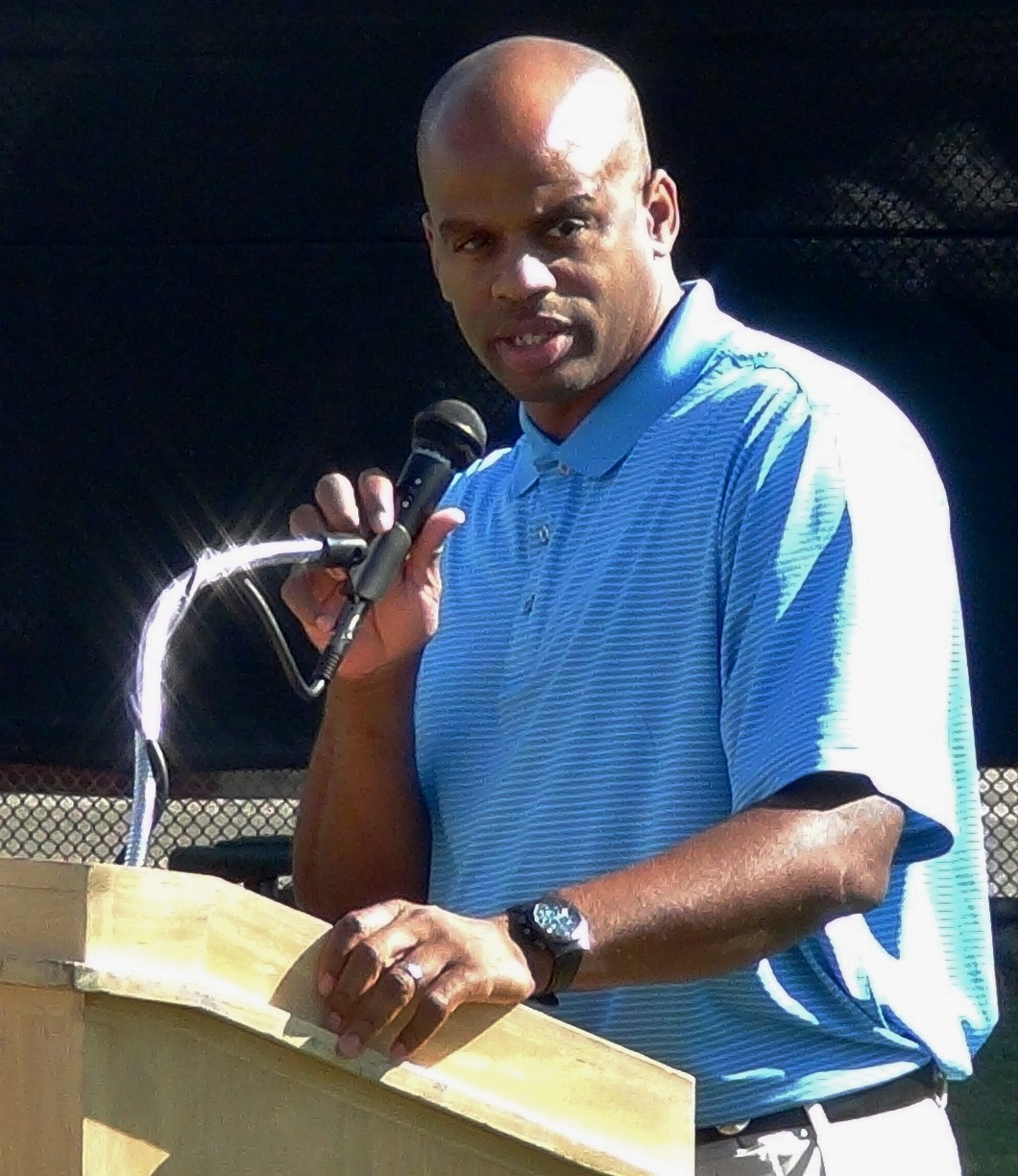
- Prioleau at a fundraising event for San Jose State in 2017.

Current position
- Title: Assistant coach
- Team: Stephen F. Austin
- Conference: Southland

Biographical details
- Born: March 30, 1970 (age 56); New York City, U.S.

Playing career
- 1988–1992: Fordham
- 1992, 1993: Long Island Surf
- 1992–1993: Yakima Sun Kings
- 1993: Grand Rapids Hoops
- 1993–1994: Sioux Falls Skyforce
- 1997–1999: Sicc BPA Jesi
- Position: Guard / point guard

Coaching career (HC unless noted)
- 1999–2000: Fordham (assistant)
- 2000–2005: Wichita State (assistant)
- 2005–2006: Marquette (assistant)
- 2006–2008: Iowa State (assistant)
- 2008–2010: TCU (assistant)
- 2010–2013: Colorado (assistant)
- 2013–2017: Colorado (assoc. Head Coach)
- 2017–2021: San Jose State
- 2023–present: Stephen F. Austin (assistant)

Jéan-Edúard Prioleau (born March 30, 1970) is an American college basketball coach. He is currently assistant coach at Stephen F. Austin State University. Previously, he was head men's basketball coach at San Jose State from 2017 to 2021.

Prioleau grew up in Teaneck, New Jersey, and graduated from Teaneck High School. played college basketball at Fordham, where he was a two-time all-Patriot League honoree and helped Fordham qualify for the NCAA tournament for the first time in over 20 years. From 1992 to 1999, Prioleau played professional basketball for the Continental Basketball Association in the U.S. and various European leagues.

In 1999, Prioleau began his basketball coaching career at Fordham. He subsequently had assistant coaching positions at Wichita State under Mark Turgeon, Marquette under Tom Crean, Iowa State under Greg McDermott, TCU under Jim Christian, and Colorado under Tad Boyle. After 18 years as an assistant coach, Prioleau got his first head coaching position at San Jose State in 2017.

== Early life and college basketball career ==
Prioleau was born in New York City and raised in Teaneck, New Jersey. At Teaneck High School, Prioleau was named all-state third team and all-league as well as all-county first team.

At Fordham University, Prioleau played at guard for the Fordham Rams from 1988 to 1992. In the 1991 Patriot League men's basketball tournament title game, Prioleau the winning three at the buzzer in Fordham's 84–81 win over Holy Cross. As a senior, Prioleau averaged 12.8 points per game and led Fordham to its fourth NCAA Tournament appearance in 1992. Prioleau earned second-team All-Patriot League honors in 1991 and 1992. He left the program second in career steals and fifth in career points. Prioleau graduated with a Bachelor of Science in physics. In 2000, Prioleau was inducted into the Fordham Athletics Hall of fame.

== Pro basketball career ==
Following his college career, Prioleau played two seasons in the Continental Basketball Association (CBA) for the Yakima Sun Kings, the Grand Rapids Hoops and the Sioux Falls Skyforce. In 55 games, his CBA career averages were 3.7 points and 1.8 assists per game.

Prioleau played for a Swiss team in 1994–95 and Turkish team in 1995–96. Then from 1997 to 1999, Prioleau played for Italian team Sicc BPA Jesi.

== Coaching career ==
=== Early coaching career (1999–2010) ===
Prioleau returned to Fordham to begin his coaching career as an assistant under new coach Bob Hill in 1999. Fordham went 14–15 (7–9 in Atlantic 10 Conference games), a two-game improvement overall and in conference from the last season.

From 2000 to 2005, Prioleau was an assistant coach at Wichita State under Mark Turgeon. The new coaching staff inherited a program that had just one winning season in the entire 1990s. Wichita State qualified for the National Invitation Tournament three straight seasons from 2003 to 2005; Prioleau helped build some of the best recruiting classes in program history.

In the 2005–06 season, Prioleau was an assistant coach at Marquette under Tom Crean. Marquette went 20–11 and qualified for the NCAA tournament.

From 2006 to 2008, Prioleau was an assistant coach at Iowa State under Greg McDermott. Iowa State went 15–16 in 2006–07 and 14–18 in 2007–08. Then from 2008 to 2010, Prioleau was an assistant coach at TCU under Jim Christian. TCU went 14–17 and 13–19 in Prioleau's two seasons on staff.

=== Colorado assistant (2010–2017) ===
On May 12, 2010, new head coach Tad Boyle hired Prioleau as an assistant coach on his staff at Colorado. Coming off four straight losing seasons, Colorado improved to 24–11 and an NIT appearance. Prioleau was promoted to associate head coach in 2013 and would remain on staff through the 2016–17 season; Colorado had winning records and postseason appearances every season including four NCAA Tournament appearances (2012–14 and 2016).

=== San Jose State (2017–2021) ===
On August 4, 2017, Prioleau was hired as head coach at San Jose State. Previous head coach Dave Wojcik resigned the previous month following a 14–16 season. By the end of the month, top scorer Brandon Clarke transferred to Gonzaga. Prioleau's first season at San Jose State had a 4–27 record, with a 1–17 record in Mountain West Conference play. After the season, three starting players transferred. The 2018–19 season had the same win–loss record.

The 2019–20 season began with an upset of defending Colonial Athletic Association regular season champion Hofstra in an away game. San Jose State had a 2–3 start in Mountain West play after wins over New Mexico and defending Mountain West regular season champion Nevada in the first two weeks of January. However, San Jose State finished only marginally better than last season with a 7–24 (3–15 MW).

In Prioleau's final season as head coach in 2020–21, San Jose State went 5–16 (2–12 MW). Multiple games were canceled or rescheduled due to the COVID-19 pandemic. On March 12, 2021, Prioleau was fired.

== Head coaching record ==
Record table
Season	Team	Overall	Conference	Standing	Postseason
San Jose State Spartans (Mountain West Conference) (2017–2021)
2017–18	San Jose State	4–26	1–17	11th	
2018–19	San Jose State	4–27	1–17	11th	
2019–20	San Jose State	7–24	3–15	10th	
2020–21	San Jose State	5–16	3–13	9th	
San Jose State:		20–93 (.177)	8–62 (.114)		
Total:		20–93 (.177)			
National champion Postseason invitational champion Conference regular season champion Conference regular season and conference tournament champion Division regular season champion Division regular season and conference tournament champion Conference tournament champion
