= Anja Spasojević =

Serbian volleyball player

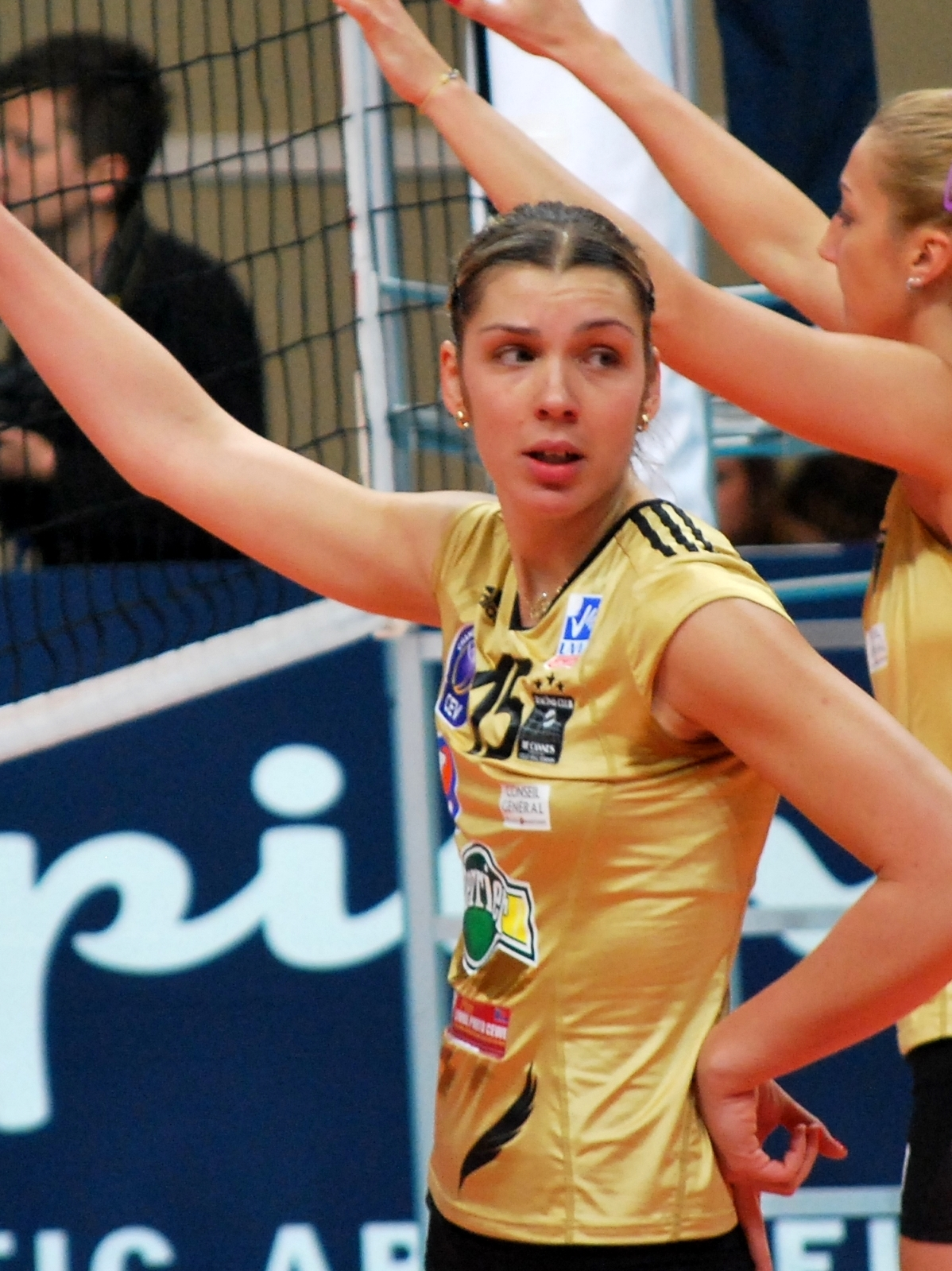

Personal information
- Full name: Anja Spasojević
- Nickname: Aki
- Nationality: Serbian
- Born: 4 July 1983 (age 43); Belgrade, SR Serbia, SFR Yugoslavia
- Hometown: Belgrade
- Height: 1.87 m (6 ft 2 in)
- Weight: 75 kg (165 lb)
- Spike: 308 cm (121 in)
- Block: 300 cm (120 in)

Volleyball information
- Position: Wing spiker
- Current club: Retired

Career
Years	Teams
1998–2004; 2004–2007; 2007–2008; 2008–2009; 2009–2010; 2010–2012; 2012–2013; 2013; 2013–2014	Crvena Zvezda; Sant'Orsola Asystel Novara; Voléro Zürich; Fenerbahçe Acıbadem; Universitet Belgorod; RC Cannes; Universal Volley Modena; Ufimochka Ufa; Dinamo Krasnodar

National team
2000–2003; 2003–2006; 2006–2008	FR Yugoslavia; Serbia and Montenegro; Serbia
Honours
Women's volleyball
World Championship
Bronze medal – third place	2006 Japan	Team
European Championship
Silver medal – second place	2007 Belgium/Luxembourg	Team
- Last updated: 28 August 2010

Anja Spasojević (Cyrillic: Ања Спасојевић; born 4 July 1983) is a retired Serbian professional volleyball player who was last played as wing spiker for Dinamo Krasnodar in Russia. She began her professional career in Red Star Belgrade, and then played in Asystel Novara, Voléro Zürich, Fenerbahçe Acıbadem, Universitet Belgorod, RC Cannes, Universal Volley Modena, Ufimochka Ufa and then was ended her career in Dinamo Krasnodar. With Serbia national team, Spasojević won bronze medal at the 2006 FIVB Women's World Championship and silver medal at the 2007 Women's European Volleyball Championship.

== Personal life ==
Anja Spasojević is fluent in Serbian, English, Italian and German.

== Controversies ==
Spasojević did not play for Serbia national team at the 2008 Summer Olympics qualification tournament due to an injury, and it attracted many controversies. She explained she had had problems with injuries since the 2007 European Championship, but that "some persons did not believe it was a serious injury". Spasojević also confirmed the conflict with the team manager Zoran Terzić and the rest of the team, and that the two had tried to settle things down. She announced she would not play for the national team at the 2008 Summer Olympics, but that she might return in the future. But from that period Spasojević was not capped for the national team.

== Clubs ==
- (Serbia and Montenegro) Crvena Zvezda (1998–04)
- (Italy) Sant'Orsola Asystel Novara (2004–07)
- (Switzerland) Voléro Zürich (2007–08)
- (Turkey) Fenerbahçe Acıbadem (2008–09)
- (Russia) Universitet Belgorod (2009–10)
- (France) RC Cannes (2010–12)
- (Italy) Universal Volley Modena (2012–13)
- (Russia) Ufimochka Ufa (2013)
- (Russia) Dinamo Krasnodar (2013–14)

== Awards ==
=== Individuals ===
- 2002 Best Sportswoman of 2002 Best Sportswoman of SD Crvena Zvezda
- 2006–07 CEV Cup "Best Server"

=== Clubs ===
- 2006 Italian Super Cup - Champion, with Sant'Orsola Asystel Novara
- 2006 CEV Top Teams Cup - Champion, with Asystel Novara
- 2007 CEV Cup - Bronze Medal, with Asystel Novara
- 2009 Turkish Championship - Champion, with Fenerbahçe Acıbadem

=== National Senior Team ===
- 2006 FIVB World Championship - Bronze Medal
- 2007 European Championship - Silver Medal
