= Francesca Piccinini =

Italian volleyball player

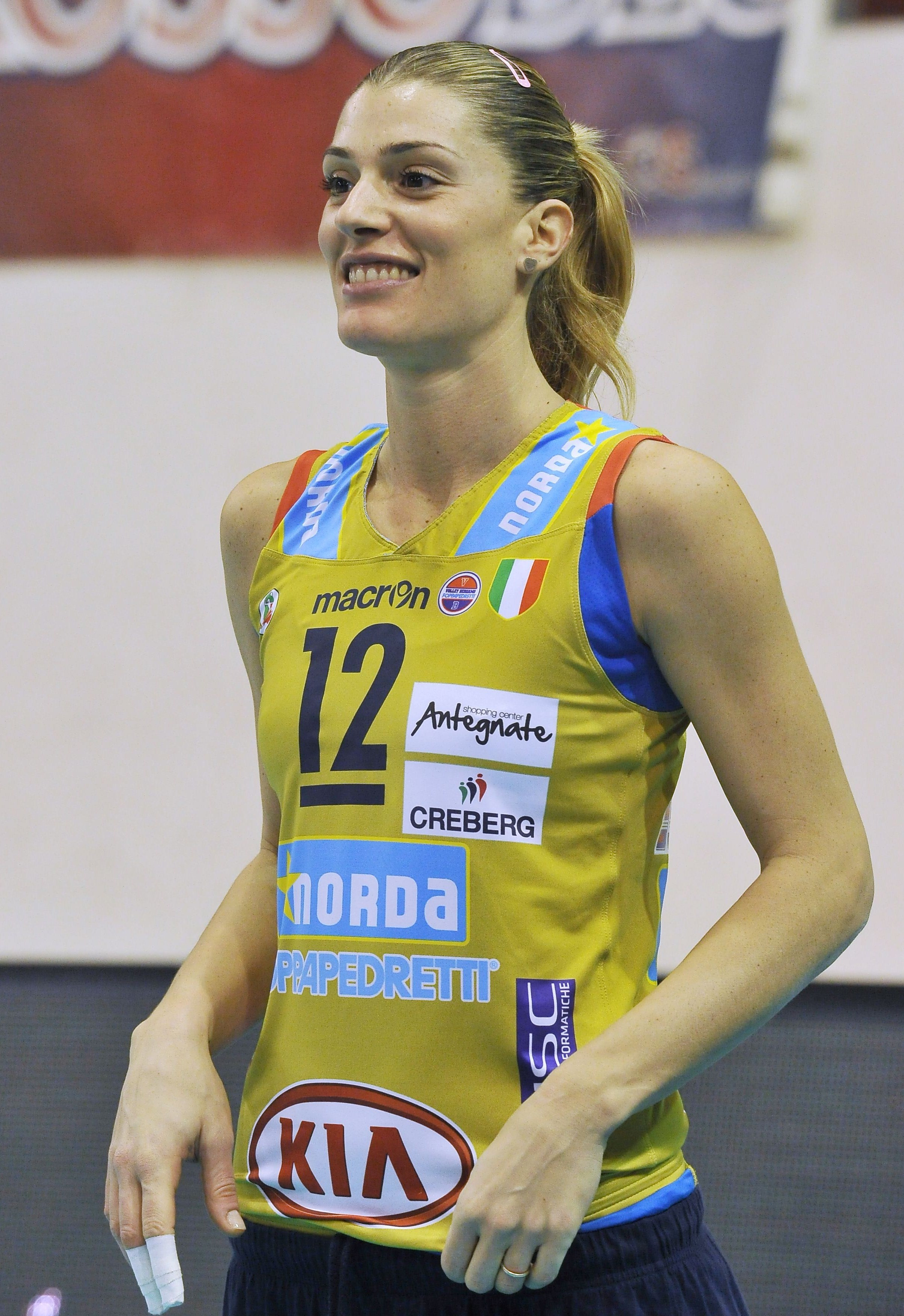

Personal information
- Born: 10 January 1979 (age 47); Massa, Italy
- Height: 1.84 m (6 ft 1/2 in)
- Weight: 62 kg (137 lb)
- Spike: 325 cm (128 in)
- Block: 298 cm (117 in)

Volleyball information
- Position: Wing Spiker

National team
1995–2016	Italy
Medal record
Women's volleyball
Representing Italy
World Championship
Gold medal – first place	2002 Germany	Team
World Grand Champions Cup
Gold medal – first place	2009 Tokyo/Fukuoka	Team
FIVB World Cup
Gold medal – first place	2007 Japan	Team
FIVB World Grand Prix
Silver medal – second place	2004 Reggio Calabria	Team
Silver medal – second place	2005 Sendai	Team
Bronze medal – third place	2006 Reggio Calabria	Team
Bronze medal – third place	2008 Yokohama	Team
Bronze medal – third place	2010 Ningbo	Team
European Championship
Gold medal – first place	2007 Belgium	Team
Gold medal – first place	2009 Poland	Team
Silver medal – second place	2001 Bulgaria	Team
Silver medal – second place	2005 Croatia	Team
Mediterranean Games
Gold medal – first place	2009 Pescara	Team

Francesca Piccinini (born 10 January 1979 in Massa) is a former Italian volleyball player. Making her debut for Italy on 10 June 1995 against the United States, she has represented Italy four times (2000, 2004, 2008 and 2012) at the Summer Olympics. She was also a member of the Women's National Team, winning the gold medal at the 2002 World Championship in Germany. She was inspired to become a professional volleyball player by the Japanese anime Attack No. 1, shown in Italy in the 1980s under the title Mimì e la nazionale della pallavolo.

In 2004, she appeared nude in a calendar published by the Italian magazine Men's Health and modeled for Liu·Jo.

Playing professionally with the Italian club Volley Bergamo, she won the "Most Valuable Player" award when her team won the 2009–10 CEV Indesit Champions League title.

Piccinini played with her national team at the 2014 World Championship. There her team ended up in fourth place after losing the bronze medal match 2–3 to Brazil.

In 2016, she again became "Most Valuable Player" when her team, Pomì Casalmaggiore, claimed the 2015–16 CEV DenizBank Champions League title 3–0 over the Turkish VakıfBank Istanbul.

== Clubs ==
- (Italy) Robur Massa (1991–1993)
- (Italy) Pallavolo Carrarese (1993–1995)
- (Italy) Reggio Emilia (1995–1996)
- (Italy) Volley Modena (1996–1997)
- (Italy) Volley 2000 Spezzano (1997–1998)
- (Brazil) Rexona Volley (1998–1999)
- (Italy) Volley Bergamo (1999–2012)
- (Italy) Chieri Volley (2012–2013)
- (Italy) LJ Volley (2013–2015)
- (Italy) Pomì Casalmaggiore (2015–2016)
- (Italy) Igor Gorgonzola Novara (2016–2019)
- (Italy) Futura Volley Busto Arsizio (2020–2021)

== Awards ==
=== Individuals ===
- 2004 FIVB World Grand Prix "Fair Play Award"
- 2006–07 CEV Champions League "Best Spiker"
- 2009–10 CEV Indesit Champions League Final Four "Most Valuable Player"
- 2015–16 CEV DenizBank Champions League Final Four "Most Valuable Player"

== Clubs ==
- 1999 Italian Supercup - Champions, with Volley Bergamo
- 1999–00 Women's CEV Champions League — Champions, with Volley Bergamo
- 2000–01 Italian Championship - Runner-Up, with Volley Bergamo
- 2001 Italian Supercup — Runner-Up, with Volley Bergamo
- 2001 Italian Cup — Runner-Up, with Volley Bergamo
- 2001–02 Women's CEV Champions League — Runner-Up, with Volley Bergamo
- 2001–02 Italian Championship - Champion, with Volley Bergamo
- 2002 Italian Supercup — Runner-Up, with Volley Bergamo
- 2002 Italian Cup — Runner-Up, with Volley Bergamo
- 2002–03 Women's CEV Champions League — Bronze medal, with Volley Bergamo
- 2003–04 CEV Challenge Cup - Champions, with Volley Bergamo
- 2003–04 Italian Championship - Champion, with Volley Bergamo
- 2004 Italian Supercup - Champions, with Volley Bergamo
- 2004 Italian Cup — Runner-Up, with Volley Bergamo
- 2004–05 Women's CEV Champions League — Champions, with Volley Bergamo
- 2004–05 Italian Championship - Runner-Up, with Volley Bergamo
- 2005 Italian Supercup — Runner-Up, with Volley Bergamo
- 2005 Italian Cup — Runner-Up, with Volley Bergamo
- 2005–06 Women's CEV Champions League — Bronze medal, with Volley Bergamo
- 2005–06 Italian Championship - Champion, with Volley Bergamo
- 2006 Italian Cup — Champions, with Volley Bergamo
- 2006–07 CEV Champions League — Champions, with Volley Bergamo
- 2008 Italian Supercup — Runner-Up, with Volley Bergamo
- 2008 Italian Cup — Champions, with Volley Bergamo
- 2008–09 CEV Champions League — Champions, with Volley Bergamo
- 2009–10 CEV Champions League — Champions, with Volley Bergamo
- 2010 Italian Cup — Runner-Up, with Volley Bergamo
- 2010 FIVB Club World Championship — Bronze medal, with Volley Bergamo
- 2010–11 Italian Championship - Champion, with Volley Bergamo
- 2011 Italian Supercup - Champions, with Volley Bergamo
- 2011 Italian Cup — Runner-Up, with Volley Bergamo
- 2015 Italian Cup — Runner-Up, with LJ Volley
- 2015–16 CEV Champions League — Champions, with Pomì Casalmaggiore
- 2018–19 CEV Champions League — Champions, with Igor Gorgonzola Novara
- 2019 Italian Cup — Champions, with Igor Gorgonzola Novara
- 2020 Italian Cup — Runner-Up, with Futura Volley Busto Arsizio
