= Ekaterina Tretyakova =

Russian volleyball player (born 1984)

Personal information
- Nationality: Russian
- Born: Yekaterina Starodubova; 19 October 1984 (age 42); Chelyabinsk, Russia
- Height: 1.76 m (5 ft 9 in)
- Weight: 65 kg (143 lb)
- Spike: 301 cm (119 in)
- Block: 292 cm (115 in)
- Education: VC Universitet-Tekhnolog Belgorod

Volleyball information
- Position: Libero
- Current club: Leningradka Saint Petersburg

National team
Russia

Ekaterina Tretyakova (born 19 October 1984) is a Russian volleyball player for Leningradka Saint Petersburg and the Russian national team.

She played for VC Universitet-Tekhnolog Belgorod. She participated at the 2017 Women's European Volleyball Championship. and the 2017 FIVB Volleyball Women's World Grand Champions Cup.
