= 2006–07 CEV Women's Champions League =

- League: CEV Women's Champions League
- Sport: Volleyball

CEV Women's Champions League seasons
- ← 2005–06 2007–08 →

The 2006–07 Women's CEV Champions League was the highest level of European club volleyball in the 2006-07 season.

== Group stage ==
=== Pool A ===
| Team | | Pts | G | W | L | GF | GA |
|---|---|---|---|---|---|---|---|
| 1 | (Russia) Dynamo Moscow | 11 | 6 | 5 | 1 | 16 | 6 |
| 2 | (France) RC Cannes | 9 | 6 | 3 | 3 | 11 | 10 |
| 3 | (Turkey) VakıfBank | 9 | 6 | 3 | 3 | 12 | 11 |
| 4 | (Poland) Muszynianka Fakro Muszyna | 7 | 6 | 3 | 3 | 4 | 16 |

=== Pool B ===
| Team | | Pts | G | W | L | GF | GA |
|---|---|---|---|---|---|---|---|
| 1 | (Italy) Vini Monteschiavo Jesi | 11 | 6 | 5 | 1 | 17 | 9 |
| 2 | (Switzerland) Voléro Zürich | 9 | 6 | 3 | 3 | 12 | 13 |
| 3 | (Spain) Hotel Cantur Las Palmas | 8 | 6 | 2 | 4 | 11 | 13 |
| 4 | (Netherlands) HCC/net Martinus Amstelveen | 8 | 6 | 2 | 4 | 8 | 13 |

=== Pool C ===
| Team | | Pts | G | W | L | GF | GA |
|---|---|---|---|---|---|---|---|
| 1 | (Italy) Scavolini Pesaro | 11 | 6 | 5 | 1 | 15 | 6 |
| 2 | (Turkey) Eczacibasi Istanbul | 10 | 6 | 4 | 2 | 13 | 9 |
| 3 | (Azerbaijan) Azerrail Baku | 9 | 6 | 3 | 3 | 12 | 10 |
| 4 | (Austria) SVS Post Schwechat | 6 | 6 | 0 | 6 | 3 | 18 |

=== Pool D ===
| Team | | Pts | G | W | L | GF | GA |
|---|---|---|---|---|---|---|---|
| 1 | (Italy) Foppapedretti Bergamo | 12 | 6 | 6 | 0 | 18 | 3 |
| 2 | (Spain) Spar Tenerife Marichal | 9 | 6 | 3 | 3 | 12 | 10 |
| 3 | (Poland) Winiary Kalisz | 9 | 6 | 3 | 3 | 11 | 10 |
| 4 | (Croatia) Mladost Zagreb | 6 | 6 | 0 | 6 | 0 | 18 |

== Play-off ==
Play-off 12
| (France) RC Cannes | (Poland) Winiary Kalisz | 3:0 | 3:1 |
| (Turkey) VakıfBank | (Italy) Vini Monteschiavo Jesi | 1:3 | 0:3 |
| (Russia) Dynamo Moscow | (Spain) Hotel Cantur Las Palmas | 3:2 | 3:0 |
| (Netherlands) HCC/net Martinus Amstelveen | (Turkey) Eczacibasi Istanbul | 3:0 | 1:3 |
| (Spain) Spar Tenerife Marichal | (Italy) Scavolini Pesaro | 3:1 | 3:0 |
| (Italy) Foppapedretti Bergamo | (Azerbaijan) Azerrail Baku | 3:0 | 3:0 |
Play-off 6
| (Italy) Foppapedretti Bergamo | (Italy) Vini Monteschiavo Jesi | 2:3 | 3:1 |
| (Russia) Dynamo Moscow | (Netherlands) HCC/net Martinus Amstelveen | 3:0 | 1:3 |
| (France) RC Cannes | (Spain) Spar Tenerife Marichal | 2:3 | 1:3 |

== Final four ==
Zurich 24–25 March 2007

Semi-finals
24 March
(Italy) Foppapedretti Bergamo | 3
(Spain) Spar Tenerife Marichal | 0
24 March
(Switzerland) Voléro Zürich | 2
(Russia) Dynamo Moscow | 3

Final
25 March
(Italy) Foppapedretti Bergamo | 3
(Russia) Dynamo Moscow | 2
3rd place
25 March
(Switzerland) Voléro Zürich | 0
(Spain) Spar Tenerife Marichal | 3

== Final standing ==
| Rank | Team |
|---|---|
| 1st place, gold medalist(s) | (Italy) Foppapedretti Bergamo |
| 2nd place, silver medalist(s) | (Russia) Dynamo Moscow |
| 3rd place, bronze medalist(s) | (Spain) Spar Tenerife Marichal |
| 4 | (Switzerland) Voléro Zürich |

2006–07 Women's Club European Champions

Volley Bergamo
5th title

Roster for Final Four
Angelina Grün, Paola Croce, Katarzyna Gujska, Jenny Barazza, Katarina Barun, Manuela Secolo, Indre Sorokaite, Paola Paggi, Francesca Piccinini, Eleonora Lo Bianco and Maja Poljak
Head coach
Marco Fegnolio

== Awards ==
- MVP: (Germany) Angelina Grün, Foppapedretti Bergamo
- Best Scorer: (Belgium) Virginie De Carne, Voléro Zürich
- Best Spiker: (Italy) Francesca Piccinini, Foppapedretti Bergamo
- Best Receiver: (Poland) Milena Rosner, Spar Tenerife Marichal
- Best Server: (Russia) Ekaterina Gamova, Dynamo Moscow
- Best Blocker: (Russia) Anastasia Belikova, Dynamo Moscow
- Best Setter: (Italy) Eleonora Lo Bianco, Foppapedretti Bergamo
- Best Libero: (Spain) Esther López, Spar Tenerife Marichal

== See also ==
- Men's CEV Champions League 2006-07
