= Volley Bergamo =

Italian women's volleyball club

- Full name: Volley Bergamo 1991
- Founded: 1991
- Ground: PalaFacchetti, Treviglio, Italy (Capacity: 2,880)
- Chairman: Chiara Paola Rusconi
- Head coach: Marcello Cervellin
- League: FIPAV Women's Serie A1
- Website: Club home page

Uniforms
Home	Away

Volley Bergamo is an Italian women's volleyball club based in Bergamo and currently playing in the Serie A1.

== Previous names ==
Due to sponsorship, the club have competed under the following names:

- Volley Bergamo (1991–1992)
- Foppapedretti Bergamo (1992–2000)
- Radio 105 Foppapedretti Bergamo (2000–2006)
- Play Radio Foppapedretti Bergamo (2006–2007)
- Foppapedretti Bergamo (2007–2010)
- Norda Foppapedretti Bergamo (2010–2012)
- Foppapedretti Bergamo (2012–2018)
- Zanetti Bergamo (2018–2021)
- Volley Bergamo 1991 (2021–2026)
- ChorusLife Volley Bergamo (2026–)

== History ==
=== Beginnings (1991–1994) ===
Volley Bergamo was founded in 1991 by Mauro Ferraris and first played in the 1991–92 Serie B1 (third tier). In the following season (1992–93) it started a partnership with Foppapedretti and gained promotion to the Serie A2 (second tier). The club gain a second successive promotion in 1993–94 by winning the Serie A2 and being promoted to the Serie A1 (first tier).

=== Major success (1995–2007) ===
In 1994–95, its debut season at Serie A1, the club finished in fifth position, earning for the first time qualification for a European competition (CEV Cup). In the following season it won both the Serie A1 and the Coppa Italia for the first time. In the 1996–97 the club won the Serie A1, Coppa Italia, Italian Super Cup and the CEV Champions League. For the next decade the club became one of the strongest women's volleyball clubs in Europe, winning another five Serie A1 (1997–98, 1998–99, 2001–02, 2003–04, 2005–06), two Coppa Italia (1997–98, 2005–06), four Italian Super Cups (1997–98, 1998–99, 1999–00, 2004–05), four CEV Champions League (1998–99, 1999–00, 2004–05, 2006–07) and one CEV Cup (2003–04).

=== Recent years (2008–present) ===
Despite not being as dominant as before, the club after 2008 won the Serie A again (2010–11), the Coppa Italia (2007–08 and 2015–16), the Italian Super Cup (2011–12) and the CEV Champions League (2008–09 and 2009–10). It is the most successful Italian team in the CEV Champions League history with 7 titles and the second most successful team in Serie A history with 8 titles.

In June 2021 Volley Bergamo Foppapedretti sold its rights to play in Serie A1 to a new company, Volley Bergamo 1991 S.r.l.

== Team ==
2026–2027 Team
Number	Player	Position	Height (m)	Birth date
1	(France) Juliette Gelin	Libero	1.65	2 November 2001 (age 24)
2	(Belgium) Silke Van Avermaet (c)	Middle Blocker	1.92	2 June 1999 (age 27)
3	(Italy) Maria Teresa Bassi	Opposite	1.88	28 September 2002 (age 24)
4	(Germany) Lena Stigrot	Outside Hitter	1.84	20 December 1994 (age 31)
5	(United States) Kendall Kipp	Opposite	1.96	12 December 2000 (age 25)
7	(Italy) Elena Pietrini	Outside Hitter	1.88	17 March 2000 (age 26)
8	(Italy) Giada Agazzi	Middle Blocker	1.90	17 April 2003 (age 23)
9	(Italy) Ilaria Battistoni	Setter	1.74	22 April 1996 (age 30)
10	(Italy) Safa Allaoui	Setter	1.85	1 February 2006 (age 20)
15	(Italy) Erika Esposito	Outside Hitter	1.85	1 February 2006 (age 20)
17	(Italy) Denise Meli	Middle Blocker	1.83	9 April 2001 (age 25)
18	(Italy) Maria Adelaide Babatunde	Middle Blocker	1.88	3 April 1998 (age 28)
21	(Italy) Anna Rocca	Libero	1.68	17 June 2002 (age 24)
55	(Italy) Federica Carletti	Outside Hitter	1.84	14 March 2000 (age 26)

== Notable players ==
- (Italy) Maurizia Cacciatori (1995–1998, 1999–2003)
- (Italy) Antonella Del Core (2008–2010)
- (Italy) Paola Croce (2004–2008)
- (Italy) Jenny Barazza (2003–2009)
- (Italy) Paola Paggi (2002–2007, 2014–2018)
- (Italy) Simona Rinieri (1999–2001)
- (Italy) Eleonora Lo Bianco (2005–2011, 2015–2017)
- (Italy) Serena Ortolani (2008–2011)
- (Italy) Valentina Arrighetti (2007–2012)
- (Italy) Francesca Piccinini (1999–2012)
- (Romania) Iuliana Nucu (2010–2012)
- (Bulgaria) Antonina Zetova (2000–2001)
- (Serbia) Jelena Nikolić (2002–2003)
- (United States) Prikeba Phipps (1995–1997, 2001–2002)
- (United States) Tara Cross-Battle (2001–2002)
- (United States) Heather Bown (2002–2003)
- (Ukraine) Iryna Zhukova (2003–2005)
- (Germany) Christiane Fürst (2009–2010)
- (Germany) Angelina Grün (2003–2008)
- (Croatia) Irina Kirillova (1998–1999)
- (Croatia) Maja Poljak (2003–2008)
- (Russia) Lioubov Sokolova (2002–2005)
- (Cuba) Mireya Luis (1998–2000)
- (Cuba) Ana Fernández (1998–1999)
- (Cuba) Marlenys Costa (1998–1999)
- (Peru) Gabriela Pérez del Solar (1999–2001)

Retired numbers

- 11 (Brazil) Giseli Gavio; the number was retired in 1999
- 12 (Italy) Francesca Piccinini; the number was retired in 2013

== Head coaches ==
- (Italy) Francesco Sbalchiero (1993–1995)
- (Bulgaria) Atanas Malinov (1995–1997)
- (Italy) Marco Bonitta (1997–2000)
- (Italy) Giuseppe Cuccarini (2000–2002)
- (Italy) Mario Di Pietro (2002–2003)
- (Italy) Giovanni Caprara (2003–2005)
- (Italy) Marco Fenoglio (2005–2007)
- (Italy) Lorenzo Micelli (2007–2010)
- (Italy) Davide Mazzanti (2010–2012)
- (Italy) Stefano Lavarini (2012–2017)
- (Italy) Stefano Micoli (2017–2018)
- (Italy) Matteo Bertini (2018–2019)
- (Italy) Marcello Abbondanza (2019)
- (Italy) Marco Fenoglio (2019–2020)
- (Italy) Daniele Turino (2020–2021)
- (Italy) Pasqualino Giangrossi (2021–2022)
- (Italy) Stefano Micoli (2022–2023)
- (Italy) Matteo Solforati (2023)
- (Italy) Alberto Bigarelli (2023–2024)
- (Italy) Carlo Parisi (2024–2025)
- (Italy) Marcello Cervellin (2025–)

== Honours ==
=== National competitions ===
- National League: 8

1995–96, 1996–97, 1997–98, 1998–99, 2001–02, 2003–04, 2005–06, 2010–11

- Coppa Italia: 6

1995–96, 1996–97, 1997–98, 2005–06, 2007–08, 2015–16

- Italian Super Cup: 6

1996–97, 1997–98, 1998–99, 1999–00, 2004–05, 2011–12

=== International competitions ===
- CEV Champions League: 7

1996–97, 1998–99, 1999–00, 2004–05, 2006–07, 2008–09, 2009–10

- CEV Challenge Cup: 1

2003–04

- Women's Top Volley International: 2

1996
1998 (January)
