= Giannino Pieralisi Volley =

Italian women's volleyball club

- Full name: S.S.D. Giannino Pieralisi Volley S.r.l.
- Founded: 1969
- Ground: PalaTriccoli, Jesi, Italy (Capacity: 3,600)
- Chairman: Gabriele Pieralisi
- League: FIPAV Women's Serie B1
- Website: Club home page

Uniforms
Home	Away

Giannino Pieralisi Volley is an Italian women's volleyball club based in Jesi. It plays home matches at the PalaTriccoli hall. The club played in the Serie A1 and is currently playing in the Serie B1.

== Previous names ==
Due to sponsorship, the club have competed under the following names:

- Vini Monte Schiavo Jesi (1996–2001)
- Monte Schiavo Banca Marche Jesi (2001–2010)
- Giannino Pieralisi Volley (2010–present)

== History ==
The club was founded in 1969 and steadily progressed through the lower Italian leagues until reaching the Serie A1 (Italy's top league) in 2001.

The club proved competitive in the early 2000s, reaching quarter-finals, semi-finals and finals of the Serie A, participated in the CEV Cup (in 2003–04 and 2004–05), the CEV Women's Champions League (in 2006–07 and 2007–08) and won the European CEV Challenge Cup in the following year, defeating Panathinaikos Athens in the final.

In July 2010, the club sold its Serie A1 licence to Spes Volley Conegliano and decided to focus on youth teams as it was restarting from the Serie B2.

== Honours ==
=== International competitions ===
- CEV Challenge Cup: 1

2008–09
