= List of CEV women's club competition winners =

The European Volleyball Confederation (CEV) is the governing body for Volleyball in Europe. It organises three club competitions for women: the CEV Champions League (formerly European Cup), the CEV Cup (formerly Cup Winners Cup) and the CEV Challenge Cup. There was also the CEV Super Cup (it) but this competition no longer exist.

Russian side Dynamo Moscow have won a record total of 11 titles in women's CEV competitions, two more than VC Uralochka-NTMK (Russia). The only team to have won every CEV women's club competition is Modena Volley from Italy.

Italian clubs have won the most titles (65), ahead of clubs from the Soviet Union (33) and Turkey (19). Italy is the only country in European women's volleyball history whose clubs won the three main competitions in the same season in Eight occasion in : 1996–97, 1999–20, 2004–05, 2005–06, 2008–09, 2018–19, 2023–24 and 2024–25.

== Winners ==
=== By club ===
Dynamo Moscow is the most crowned one in CEV Champions League with 11 titles record, in CEV Cup CSKA Moscow comes first with 4 titles and in the CEV Challenge Cup USC Münster from (Germany) and Reggio Emilia Volley (Italy) share the record with 3 titles each. The following table lists all the women's clubs that have won at least one CEV club competition.

Key

CCL	CEV Champions League
CC	CEV Cup
CCC	CEV Challenge Cup
CSC	CEV Super Cup (defunct)

Most in category

List of women's CEV club competition winners
Rk.	Club	Country	CCL	CC	CCC	CSC	Total
1	Dynamo Moscow	Russia	11				11
2	VC Uralochka-NTMK	Russia	8	1			9
=	VakıfBank S.K.	Turkey	7	1	1		9
4	Volley Bergamo	Italy	7		1		8
5	Modena Volley	Italy	1	3	2	1	7
=	CSKA Moscow	Russia	3	4			7
7	Sirio Perugia	Italy	2	1	2		5
=	Materra Volley	Italy	2		2	1	5
9	ADK Alma-Ata	Soviet Union	1	3			4
=	USC Münster	Germany		1	3		4
=	Eczacıbaşı VitrA	Turkey	1	3			4
=	AGIL Volley	Italy	1	1	2		4
13	Busto Arsizio	Italy		3			3
=	Reggio Emillia	Italy			3		3
=	Imoco Conegliano	Italy	3				3
=	Dynamo Krasnodar	Russia		2	1		3
=	Dynamo Berlin	East Germany		3			3
=	VC CSKA Sofia	Bulgaria	2	1			3
=	Rudá Hvězda Praha	Czechoslovakia	2	1			3
20	Olimpia Teodora	Italy	2				2
=	Asystel Volley	Italy		2			2
=	Ancona Volley	Italy		1	1		2
=	Volley Pesaro	Italy		1	1		2
=	Monza Volley	Italy		1	1		2
=	Chieri	Italy		1	1		2
=	Pallavolo Scandicci	Italy		1	1		2
=	Gierre Roma	Italy			2		2
=	Fenerbahçe V.K.	Turkey	1	1			2
=	Bursa BBSK	Turkey			2		2
=	Dynamo Kazan	Russia	1	1			2
=	Traktor Schwerin	East Germany	1	1			2
=	Vasas SC	Hungary		2			2
=	RC Cannes	France	2				2
=	Azerrail Baku	Azerbaijan		1	1		2
35	Burevestnik Odessa	Soviet Union	1				1
=	Iskra Voroshilovgrad	Soviet Union		1			1
=	Medin Odessa	Soviet Union		1			1
=	Kommunalnik Minsk	Soviet Union		1			1
=	Orbita Zaporozhye	Soviet Union			1		1
=	Volley Casalmaggiore	Italy	1				1
=	Tiboni Urbino	Italy		1			1
=	Amatori Bari	Italy			1		1
=	Gianino Pieralisi	Italy			1		1
=	Vicenza Volley	Italy			1		1
=	Reggio Calabria	Italy			1		1
=	Sumirago Volley	Italy			1		1
=	Centro Ester	Italy			1		1
=	Roma Volley	Italy			1		1
=	Megabox Vallefoglia	Italy			1		1
=	Zarechye Odintsovo	Russia			1		1
=	CJD Berlin	Germany		1			1
=	SV Lohhof	Germany			1		1
=	CJD Feuerbach	Germany			1		1
=	Viktoria Augsburg	Germany			1		1
=	Dresdner SC	Germany			1		1
=	Levski Sofia	Bulgaria	1				1
=	Slavia Bratislava	Czechoslovakia		1			1
=	NIM-SE Budapest	Hungary	1				1
=	RC Ville Bon 91	France		1			1
=	Lokomotiv Baku	Azerbaijan			1		1
=	CV Tenerife	Spain	1				1
=	Grupo 2002 Murcia	Spain		1			1
=	HAOK Mladost	Yugoslavia	1				1
=	OK Dubrovnik	Croatia	1				1
=	Muszynianka Muszyna	Poland		1			1
=	Asterix Kieldrecht	Belgium		1			1
=	Olympiacos Piraeus	Greece			1		1
=	CSM București	Romania			1		1
=	Galatasaray S.K.	Turkey		1			1
=	Yeşilyurt Istanbul	Turkey			1		1

=== By country ===
The following table lists all the countries whose clubs have won at least one CEV competition, and is updated as of 05 May, 2026 (in chronological order).

Key
CCL	CEV Champions League
CC	CEV Cup
CCC	CEV Challenge Cup
CSC	CEV Super Cup (defunct)

Most in category

List of CEV women's club competition winners by country
Rk.	Nationality	CCL	CC	CCC	CSC	Total
1	Italy	19	17	27	2	65
2	Soviet Union	22	10	1		33
3	Turkey	9	6	4		19
4	Russia	3	4	2		9
=	Germany		2	7		9
6	East Germany	1	4			5
7	Czechoslovakia	2	2			4
=	Bulgaria	3	1			4
9	Azerbaijan		1	2		3
=	France	2	1			3
=	Hungary	1	2			3
12	Spain	1	1			2
13	Poland		1			1
=	Belgium		1			1
=	Greece			1		1
=	Croatia	1				1
=	Romania			1		1
=	Yugoslavia	1				1

== See also ==
- European Volleyball Confederation
- Clubs with the most international titles in volleyball
