= Elena Ezhova =

Russian volleyball player (born 1977)

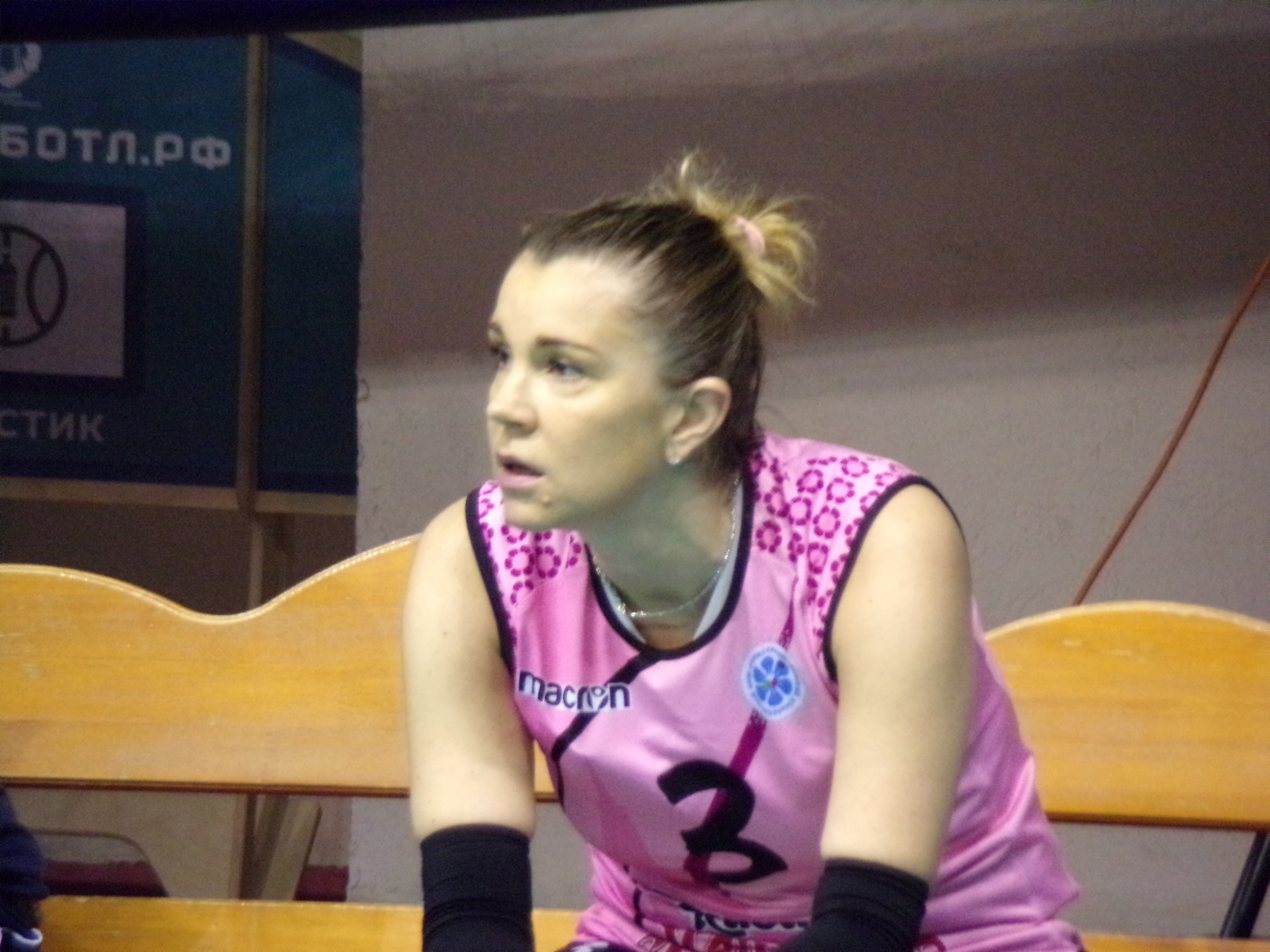
- Elena Ezhova 2018.

Personal information
- Full name: Elena Igorevna Ezhova
- Nationality: Russia
- Born: 14 August 1977 (age 49); Melitopol, Ukrainian SSR, Soviet Union
- Height: 1.78 m (5 ft 10 in)
- Weight: 69 kg (152 lb)
- Spike: 288 cm (113 in)
- Block: 282 cm (111 in)

Volleyball information
- Position: Libero
- Current club: Dinamo Kazan
- Number: 3 (club and national team)

National team
2016–	Russia
- Last updated: 19 January 2017

Elena Igorevna Ezhova, née Kuzmina (Russian: Елена Игоревна Ежо́ва; born 14 August 1977, in Melitopol) is a Russian volleyball player. She was a member of the Russia women's national volleyball team and participated at the 2016 FIVB Volleyball World Grand Prix in Thailand and the 2016 Summer Olympics in Rio de Janeiro.

At club level she played for MGFSO, Universitet-Tekhnolog, Dinamo Kazan, Dinamo Moscow, Dinamo Krasnodar and Fakel Novy Urengoy before returning to Dinamo Kazan in 2014.

== Clubs ==
- (Russia) MGFSO Moscow (1996–2002)
- (Russia) Universitet-Tekhnolog Belgorod (2002–2003)
- (Russia) Kazanochka (2003–2005)
- (Russia) Dinamo Moscow (2006–2010)
- (Russia) Dinamo Krasnodar (2010–2011)
- (Russia) Dinamo Kazan (2011–2012)
- (Russia) Dinamo Moscow (2012–2013)
- (Russia) Fakel Novy Urengoy (2013–2014)
- (Russia) Dinamo Kazan (2014–present)

== Awards ==
=== Clubs ===
- 2002–03 Russian Championship – Silver medal (with Universitet-Tekhnolog Belgorod)
- 2006–07 CEV Women's Champions League – Silver medal (with Dinamo Moscow)
- 2006–07 Russian Championship – Gold medal (with Dinamo Moscow)
- 2007 Russian Cup – Silver medal (with Dinamo Moscow)
- 2007–08 Russian Championship – Silver medal (with Dinamo Moscow)
- 2008 Russian Cup – Silver medal (with Dinamo Moscow)
- 2008–09 CEV Women's Champions League – Silver medal (with Dinamo Moscow)
- 2008–09 Russian Championship – Gold medal (with Dinamo Moscow)
- 2009 Russian Cup – Gold medal (with Dinamo Moscow)
- 2009–10 Russian Championship – Silver medal (with Dinamo Moscow)
- 2010–11 Women's CEV Cup – Silver medal (with Dinamo Krasnodar)
- 2011–12 CEV Women's Champions League – Bronze medal (with Dinamo Kazan)
- 2011–12 Russian Championship – Gold medal (with Dinamo Kazan)
- 2012 Russian Cup – Silver medal (with Dinamo Moscow)
- 2012–13 Russian Championship – Silver medal (with Dinamo Moscow)
- 2014–15 Russian Championship – Gold medal (with Dinamo Kazan)
- 2015 Russian Cup – Silver medal (with Dinamo Kazan)
- 2016 Russian Cup – Gold medal (with Dinamo Kazan)
- 2016–17 Women's CEV Cup – Gold medal (with Dinamo Kazan)
