= Irina Voronkova =

Russian volleyball player

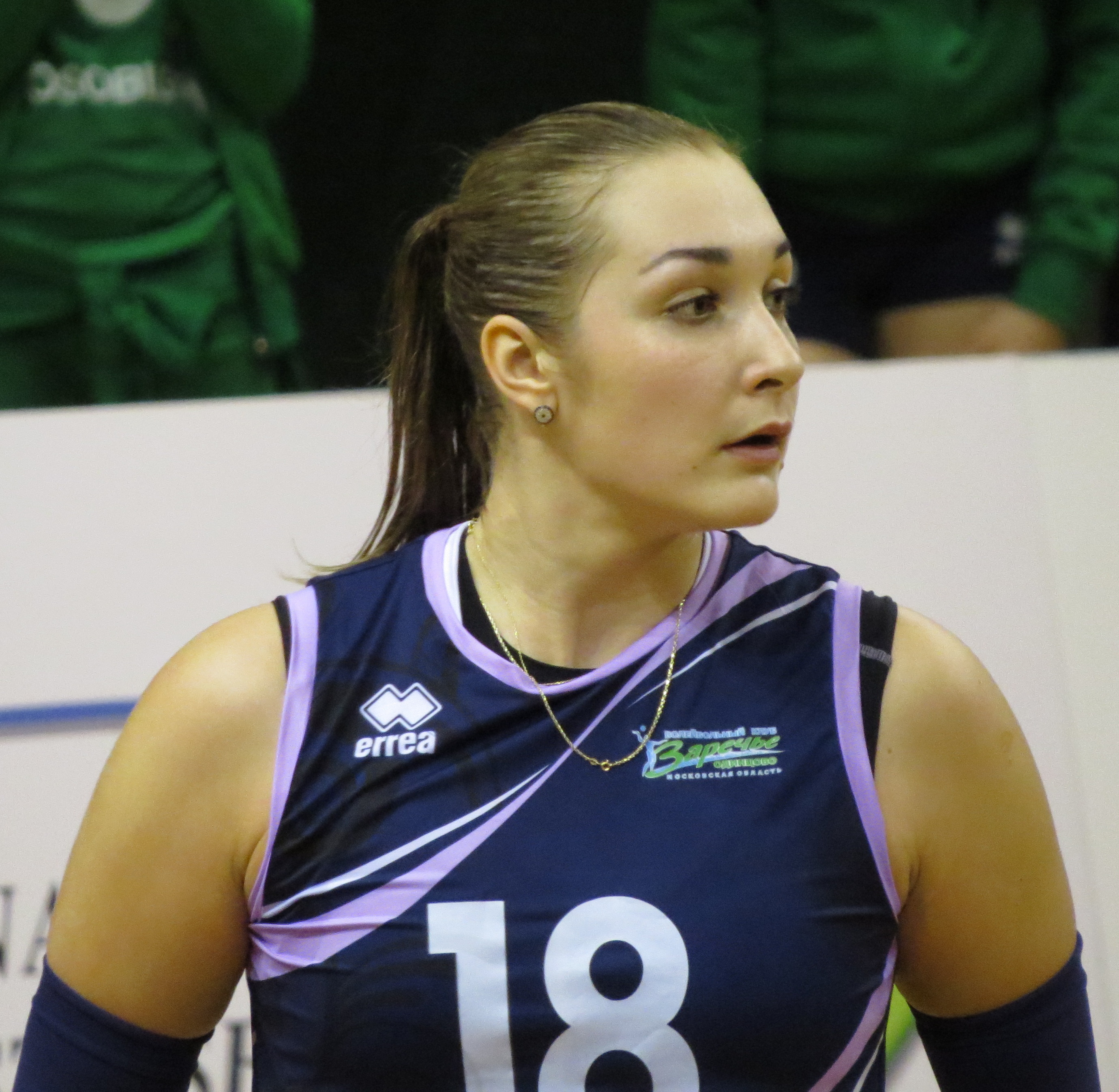
- Voronkova in 2016

Personal information
- Full name: Irina Andreyevna Voronkova
- Nationality: Russian
- Born: October 20, 1995 (age 31); Istanbul, Turkey
- Height: 190 cm (6 ft 3 in)
- Weight: 85 kg (187 lb)
- Spike: 310 cm (122 in)
- Block: 300 cm (118 in)

Volleyball information
- Position: Outside hitter
- Current club: Eczacıbaşı Dynavit
- Number: 8

Career
Years	Teams
2010 - 2011; 2011 - 2014; 2014 - 2016; 2016 - 2018; 2018 - 2022; 2022 - 2024; 2024; 2024 - 2025; 2025; 2025 - 2026	Dinamo Moscow-2; Dinamo Kazan; Zarechie Odintsovo; Dinamo Kazan; Lokomotiv Kaliningrad; Eczacıbaşı Dynavit; Jakarta Popsivo Polwan; Lokomotiv Kaliningrad; Bộ Tư lệnh Thông tin Shanghai Bright Ubest

National team
2015 -	Russia
Honours
Women's volleyball
Representing Russia
World Cup
Bronze medal – third place	2019 Japan

Irina Andreyevna Voronkova (Russian: Ирина Андреевна Воронкова; born 20 October 1995) is a Russian professional volleyball player. She is part of the Russia women's national volleyball team and was part of the national teams at the 2015 Summer Universiade in Gwangju, the 2015 Montreux Volley Masters, the 2015 European Games in Baku, the 2016 FIVB Volleyball World Grand Prix in Thailand, the 2016 Summer Olympics in Rio de Janeiro and the 2020 Summer Olympics in Tokyo.

At club level, she played for Dinamo Moscow, Dinamo Kazan and Zarechie Odintsovo before returning to Dinamo Kazan for a second spell in 2016.

== Personal life ==
Iriana Voronkova was born into a family of volleyball players. Her father Andrei Voronkov is a retired player and former national coach, her mother Svetlana Anatolyevna and sister Anna also played for local clubs. Her father was playing for a club in Istanbul when she was born there. Her first 11 years were spent in Turkey. She is fluent in Turkish.

== Awards ==
=== Individuals ===
- 2012 Junior European Championship "Best Scorer"

=== National team ===
==== Junior ====
- 2015 Universiade – Gold medal

==== Senior ====
- 2019 World Cup - Bronze medal (with Russia)

=== Clubs ===
- 2012 Russian Cup - Gold medal (with Dinamo Kazan)
- 2012 - 2013 Russian Championship - Gold medal (with Dinamo Kazan)
- 2013 Russian Cup - Silver medal (with Dinamo Kazan)
- 2013 - 2014 Russian Championship - Gold medal (with Dinamo Kazan)
- 2013 - 2014 CEV Women's Champions League - Gold medal (with Dinamo Kazan)
- 2014 FIVB Club World Championship - Gold medal (with Dinamo Kazan)
- 2016 Russian Cup - Gold medal (with Dinamo Kazan)
- 2016–17 CEV Cup - Gold medal (with Dinamo Kazan)
- 2016 - 2017 Russian Championship - Silver medal (with Dinamo Kazan)
- 2017 Russian Cup - Gold medal (with Dinamo Kazan)
- 2017 - 2018 Russian Championship - Silver medal (with Dinamo Kazan)
- 2018 - 2019 Russian Championship - Silver medal (with Lokomotiv Kaliningrad)
- 2019 Russian Cup - Bronze medal (with Lokomotiv Kaliningrad)
- 2019 - 2020 Russian Championship - Silver medal (with Lokomotiv Kaliningrad)
- 2020 - 2021 Russian Championship - Gold medal (with Lokomotiv Kaliningrad)
- 2021 Russian Cup - Silver medal (with Lokomotiv Kaliningrad)
- 2021 - 2022 Russian Championship - Gold medal (with Lokomotiv Kaliningrad)
- 2022 FIVB Club World Championship - Bronze medal (with Eczacıbaşı Dynavit)
- 2022 - 2023 Turkish League - Silver medal (with Eczacıbaşı Dynavit)
- 2022 - 2023 CEV Women's Champions League - Silver medal (with Eczacıbaşı Dynavit)
- 2023 FIVB Club World Championship - Gold medal (with Eczacıbaşı Dynavit)
- 2023 - 2024 Turkish Cup - Silver medal (with Eczacıbaşı Dynavit)
- 2023 - 2024 Turkish League - Silver medal (with Eczacıbaşı Dynavit)
- 2023 - 2024 CEV Women's Champions League - Bronze medal (with Eczacıbaşı Dynavit)
- 2023 - 2024 Indonesian Proliga - Bronze medal (with Jakarta Popsivo Polwan)
- 2024 Russian Cup - Bronze medal (with Lokomotiv Kaliningrad)
- 2024 - 2025 Russian Championship - Gold medal (with Lokomotiv Kaliningrad)
- 2025 Russian Cup - Gold medal (with Lokomotiv Kaliningrad)
- 2025 Vietnam League - Bronze medal (with Bộ Tư lệnh Thông tin)
- 2025-2026 Indonesian Proliga - Gold medal (with Jakarta Pertamina Enduro)
