= VK Lokomotiv Kaliningrad =

Russian volleyball club

Lokomotiv Kaliningrad
- Full name: Volleyball Club Lokomotiv Kaliningrad
- Founded: 2018
- Ground: Yantarny Sports Palace (Capacity: 7,200)
- Chairman: Alexander Kosyrkov
- Manager: Andrei Voronkov
- League: Women's Super League
- 2024–25: Champion
- Website: Club home page

Uniforms
| Home | Away |

Lokomotiv Kaliningrad (Russian: Локомотив Калининград) is a Russian women's volleyball club based in Kaliningrad. The club was founded in 2018 and plays in the super league, the top Russian league. Its home arena is the Yantarny Sports Palace.

== History ==
The Lokomotiv Kaliningrad was officially founded in Kaliningrad on April 9, 2018, following an agreement between the Government of the Kaliningrad Region and the board of Lokomotiv Novosibirsk, with the aim of establishing a volleyball school in the region, from youth development up to the elite level. Thanks to its economic and organizational capacity, and after applying, the club was immediately admitted to participate in the Super League for the 2018–19 season. After finishing the regular season in second place, the team ended its first championship campaign with a defeat in the championship final against Dinamo Moscow, which nevertheless secured qualification for the CEV Champions League. In the following season, the club claimed the first trophy in its history, the 2019 Russian Super Cup.

In the 2020–21 season, Lokomotiv captured its first Russian Championship title, repeating the success the following year as well. After losing two consecutive finals, the club returned to the top in the 2024–25 championship, winning its third national title and, for the first time, the Russian Cup.

== Honours ==
=== National competitions ===
- Russian Super League: 3

2020-21, 2021-22, 2024-25

- Russian Cup: 1

2025

== Notable players ==
- (Brazil) Kisy Nascimento
- (Russia) Tatiana Kosheleva
- (Serbia) Bojana Drča
- (Turkey) Ebrar Karakurt
- (Russia) Irina Voronkova
- (Russia) Ksenia Parubets
- (Serbia) Mina Popović
- (Russia) Yana Shcherban
- (Russia) Ekaterina Lyubushkina
- (Brazil) Lorenne Teixeira
