= Russian Women's Volleyball Super Cup =

- Sport: Volleyball
- Founded: 2017
- Country: Russia
- Most recent champion: Dynamo Kazan
- Website: Official website

The Russian Women's Volleyball Supercup is a volleyball competition between the champion of Russia and the winner of the Cup of Russia . The first edition of the Russian Women's Volleyball Supercup was held in the 2017 season

== List of champions ==
Years	Host	Champions	Runners-up	Score
2017	Moscow	Dynamo Moscow	Dynamo Kazan	3:1
2018	Moscow	Dynamo Moscow	Dynamo Kazan	3:1
2019	Moscow	Lokomotiv Kaliningrad	Dynamo Moscow	3:0
2020	Kazan	Dynamo Kazan	Lokomotiv Kaliningrad	3:0
2021	Not held			
2022	Kaliningrad	Dynamo Kazan	Lokomotiv Kaliningrad	3:0
2023	Moscow	Dynamo Moscow	Lokomotiv Kaliningrad	3:0
2024	Moscow	Dynamo Kazan	Dynamo Moscow	3:0

== Winners by club ==
Rk.	Club	Titles #	City	Years Won
1	Dynamo Moscow	3	Moscow	2017, 2018, 2021, 2023
2	Dynamo Kazan	3	Kazan	2020, 2022
3	Lokomotiv Kaliningrad	1	Kaliningrad	2019
