= Inessa Emelianova =

Russian volleyball player (born 1972)

Personal information
- Nationality: Russian
- Born: 17 January 1972 (age 54)
- Height: 188 m (616 ft 10 in)

Volleyball information
- Number: 15 (national team)

Career
Years	Teams
1994	Uralochka Ekaterinburg

National team
1994	Russia

Inessa Emelianova (born 17 January 1972) is a retired Russian female volleyball player. She was part of the Russia women's national volleyball team.

She participated in the 1994 FIVB Volleyball Women's World Championship. On club level she played with Uralochka Ekaterinburg.

== Clubs ==
- Uralochka Ekaterinburg (1994)
