= Women's Top Volley International =

The Women's Top Volley International is an international women's volleyball club cup competition played annually in Basel, Switzerland.

== Format ==
In 2006, the competition was contested by six clubs. In the first round, the clubs were divided in two groups of three clubs each. The club's played against the other teams of their respective groups once. The two best placed teams of each group advanced to the semifinals. The clubs eliminated in the first round disputed the fifth place playoff. The clubs defeated in the semifinals disputed the third place playoff. The semifinal winners disputed the final.

== List of champions ==
Year	Champion	Runner-up
1989	1.VC Schwerte; Germany	Racing Club de France; France
1990	Racing Club de France; France	SC Uni Basel; Switzerland
1991	Aurora Riga; Latvia	Brother Martinu; Netherlands
1992	Aurora Riga; Latvia	BTV Luzern; Switzerland
1993; January	Aurora Riga; Latvia	BTV Luzern; Switzerland
1993; December	Racing Club de Cannes; France	BTV Luzern; Switzerland
1994	VC Camagüey; Cuba	CJD Berlin; Germany
1995	Racing Club de Cannes; France	CSKA Moscow; Russia
1996	Foppapedretti Bergamo; Italy	Racing Club de Cannes; France
1998; January	Foppapedretti Bergamo; Italy	Iskra Ługańsk; Ukraine
1998; December	CSKA Moscow; Russia	Racing Club de Cannes; France
1999	Racing Club de Cannes; France	Minetti Vicenza; Italy
2001	Minetti Vicenza; Italy	Racing Club de Cannes; France
2002	Racing Club de Cannes; France	Minas; Brazil
2003	Uralochka Yekaterinburg; Russia	Minetti Vicenza; Italy
2004	Osasco; Brazil	Voléro Zürich; Switzerland
2005	Racing Club de Cannes; France	Dynamo Moscow; Russia
2006	Rio de Janeiro; Brazil	Grupo 2002 Murcia; Spain
2007	Voléro Zürich; Switzerland	Winiary Kalisz; Poland
2008	VakıfBank Istanbul; Turkey	Metal Galaţi; Romania
2009	Rio de Janeiro; Brazil	Racing Club de Cannes; France
2010	Voléro Zürich; Switzerland	Vôlei Futuro; Brazil
2011	Rabita Baku; Azerbaijan	Racing Club de Cannes; France
2012	Racing Club de Cannes; France	SESI-SP; Brazil
2013	Dinamo Krasnodar; Russia	Praia Clube; Brazil
2014	Osasco; Brazil	Voléro Zürich; Switzerland

== Titles by team ==
Club	Country	Titles
Racing Club de Cannes	France	6
Aurora Riga	Latvia	3
Foppapedretti Bergamo	Italy	2
Osasco	Brazil	2
Rio de Janeiro	Brazil	2
Voléro Zürich	Switzerland	2
1.VC Schwerte	Germany	1
CSKA Moscow	Russia	1
Dinamo Krasnodar	Russia	1
Minetti Vicenza	Italy	1
Rabita Baku	Azerbaijan	1
Racing Club de France	France	1
Uralochka Yekaterinburg	Russia	1
VakıfBank Istanbul	Turkey	1
VC Camagüey	Cuba	1

== Titles by country ==
Country	Titles
France	7
Brazil	4
Italy	3
Latvia	3
Russia	3
Switzerland	2
Azerbaijan	1
Cuba	1
Germany	1
Turkey	1
