= Lyubov Sokolova (volleyball) =

Russian volleyball player

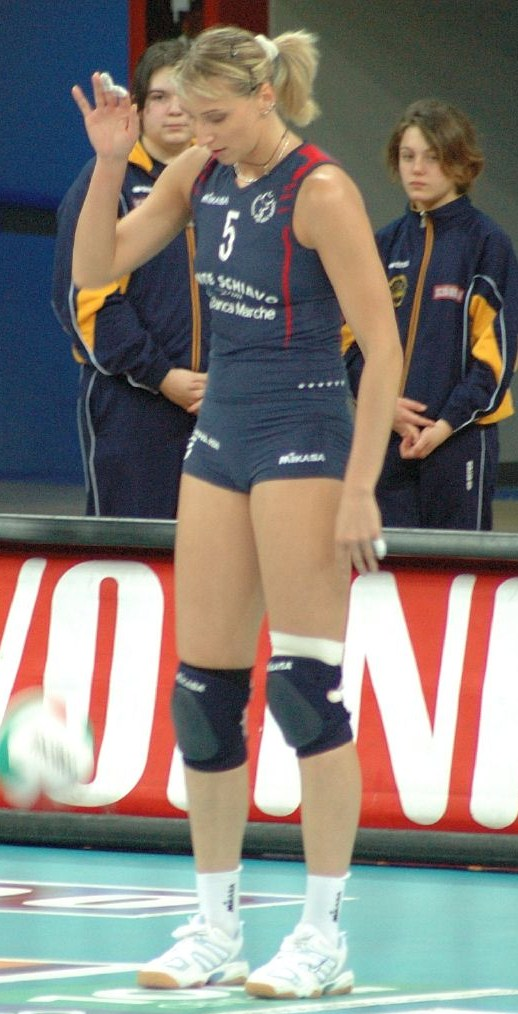
- Lyubov Sokolova in 2006

Personal information
- Full name: Lyubov Sokolova
- Nickname: Lyuba
- Nationality: Russian/Turkish
- Born: 4 December 1977 (age 48); Moscow, Russian SFSR, Soviet Union
- Height: 1.92 m (6 ft 4 in)
- Weight: 72 kg (159 lb)
- Spike: 315 cm (124 in)
- Block: 307 cm (121 in)

Volleyball information
- Position: Opposite / Outside hitter
- Number: 14 (1996); 5 (2000–2012)

National team
1996–2016	Russia
Honours
Women's volleyball
Representing Russia
Olympic Games
Silver medal – second place	2000 Sydney	Team
Silver medal – second place	2004 Athens	Team
World Championship
Gold medal – first place	2006 Japan	Team
Gold medal – first place	2010 Japan	Team
Bronze medal – third place	1998 Japan	Team
FIVB World Cup
Silver medal – second place	1999 Japan	Team
World Grand Champions Cup
Gold medal – first place	1997 Japan	Team
FIVB World Grand Prix
Gold medal – first place	1999 Yu Xi	Team
Silver medal – second place	1998 Hong Kong	Team
Silver medal – second place	2000 Manilla	Team
Silver medal – second place	2006 Reggio Calabria	Team
Bronze medal – third place	1996 Shanghai	Team
Bronze medal – third place	2001 Macau	Team
European Championship
Gold medal – first place	1999 Italy	Team
Gold medal – first place	2001 Bulgaria	Team
Bronze medal – third place	2007 Belgium/Luxembourg	Team
World U20 Championship
Bronze medal – third place	1995 Thailand	Under-20
European Junior Championship
Gold medal – first place	1994 Hungary	Under-19

Lyubov Vladimirovna Sokolova (Russian: Любо́вь Влади́мировна Соколо́ва (Шашко́ва), also known as Lyubov Kılıç and formerly known as Lyubov Shashkova, born 4 December 1977) is a Russian retired volleyball player, Honored Master of Sports of Russia. She was a member of the national team that won gold medals at the 2006 and 2010 World Championships in Japan, and silver medals at the 2000 Summer Olympics in Sydney and the 2004 Summer Olympics in Athens. Additionally, she’s the only volleyball player who has won two world titles in the same year: 2010 World Championship with Russia and 2010 World Club Championship with Fenerbahçe

== Personal life ==
She married Turkish former volleyball player Aytaç Kılıç when she was playing for Eczacıbaşı Istanbul. She has a son from her ex-husband. She has Turkish as well as Russian citizenship.

== Career ==
Sokolova has numerous individual awards in all categories. In 2006, she was honored "Best player of Europe".

She won the 2006–07 CEV Top Teams Cup with the Spanish team Grupo 2002 Murcia, and was awarded "Most Valuable Player" and "Best Server".

Sokolova won gold medal at the 2010 FIVB Volleyball Women's Club World Championship with Fenerbahçe, and 2 gold medals at the CEV Women's Champions League, 2004-05 with Radio 105 Foppapedretti Bergamo and 2011–12 with Fenerbahçe.

In May 2016, Sokolova announced her retirement from sports, but in December 2017 she returned to play for Dynamo Krasnodar. From 1 July 2018, she worked as the team’s general manager, but in February 2019 she left this position and went to work for the Volley Service sports agency. In February 2021 she was appointed as the general manager of the Russian national team.

== Clubs ==
- (Russia) CSKA Moscow (1992–1995)
- (Russia) Rossy Moscow (1995–1996)
- (Croatia) Mladost Zagabria (1997–1998)
- (Japan) Hitachi Bellefille (1998–1999)
- (Russia) Uralotchka NTMK Ekaterinburg (1999–2000)
- (Turkey) Eczacıbaşı (2000–2001)
- (Italy) Radio 105 Foppapedretti Bergamo (2002–2005)
- (Italy) Monte Schiavo Banca Marche Jesi (2005–2006)
- (Spain) Grupo 2002 Murcia (2006–2007)
- (Russia) Zarechie Odintsovo (2007–2009)
- (Italy) Monte Schiavo Banca Marche Jesi (2009–2010)
- (Turkey) Fenerbahçe (2010–2012)
- (Turkey) Eczacıbaşı (2012–2013)
- (Russia) Dinamo Krasnodar (2013–2016, 2017–2018)

== Awards ==
=== Individuals ===
- 1998 FIVB World Grand Prix "Best Scorer"
- 1998–99 5th V League "敢闘賞" (dare to fight award)
- 1998–99 5th V League "Best 6"
- 1999 FIVB World Grand Prix "Best Server"
- 1999 FIVB World Grand Prix "Dream Team: Opposite Hitter"
- 1999 FIVB World Cup "Best Spiker"
- 1999 FIVB World Cup "Best Receiver"
- 2000 FIVB World Grand Prix "Most valuable player"
- 2001 Women's European Volleyball Championship "Best Server"
- 2001 Women's European Volleyball Championship "Best Receiver"
- 2004 Cev Challenge Cup "Best server"
- 2004 Cev Challenge Cup "Most Valuable Player"
- 2004–05 CEV Champions League "Most valuable player"
- 2004–05 CEV Champions League "Best Spiker"
- 2006 CEV "Best player of European"
- 2007 European Championship "Best Receiver"
- 2006–07 Top Teams Cup "Most Valuable Player"
- 2006–07 Top Teams Cup "Best Server"
- 2007–08 Russian Championship "Most Valuable Player"
- 2007–08 Russian Championship "Best player"
- 2011 Aroma League Women's Championship "Most Valuable Player"

=== Clubs ===
- 1998–99 5th V League – Runner-Up, with Hitachi Bellefille
- 2001 Turkish Cup – Champion, with Eczacibasi Istanbul
- 2001 Turkish Championship – Champion, with Eczacibasi Istanbul
- 2003–04 CEV Challenge Cup – Champion, with Radio 105 Foppapedretti Bergamo
- 2003–04 Italian Championship – Champion, with Radio 105 Foppapedretti Bergamo
- 2004 Italian Super Cup – Champion, with Radio 105 Foppapedretti Bergamo
- 2004–05 CEV Champions League – Champion, with Radio 105 Foppapedretti Bergamo
- 2006 Spanish Super Cup – Champion, with Grupo 2002 Murcia
- 2007 Spanish Queen Cup – Champion, with Grupo 2002 Murcia
- 2006–07 Spanish Championship – Champion, with Grupo 2002 Murcia
- 2006–07 CEV Top Teams Cup – Champion, with Grupo 2002 Murcia
- 2007 Russian Cup – Champion, with Zarechie Odintsovo
- 2007–08 Russian Championship – Champion, with Zarechie Odintsovo
- 2007–08 CEV Champions League – Runner-Up, with Zarechie Odintsovo
- 2008–09 Russian Championship – Runner-Up, with Zarechie Odintsovo
- 2010 Turkish Super Cup – Champion, with Fenerbahçe
- 2010 FIVB Club World Championship – Champion, with Fenerbahçe
- 2010–11 CEV Champions League – Bronze medal, with Fenerbahçe
- 2010–11 Aroma Women's Volleyball League – Champion, with Fenerbahçe
- 2011–12 CEV Champions League – Champion, with Fenerbahçe Universal
- 2012 Turkish Volleyball Super Cup – Champion, with Eczacıbaşı VitrA
- 2012–13 Turkish Women's Volleyball Cup – Runner-Up, with Eczacıbaşı VitrA
- 2012–13 Turkish Women's Volleyball League – Runner-Up, with Eczacıbaşı VitrA
- 2014 Russian Cup – Champion, with Dinamo Krasnodar
- 2014–2015 CEV Cup – Champion, with Dinamo Krasnodar
- 2015 Russian Cup – Champion, with Dinamo Krasnodar
- 2015 FIVB Club World Championship – Runner-Up, with Dinamo Krasnodar
- 2015–2016 CEV Cup – Champion, with Dinamo Krasnodar
- 2015–16 Russian Championship – Bronze medal, with Dinamo Krasnodar

Awards
Preceded by (Brazil) Raquel Silva	Best Server of FIVB World Grand Prix; 1999	Succeeded by (Brazil) Érika Coimbra
Preceded by (Brazil) Virna Dias	Most Valuable Player of FIVB World Grand Prix; 2000	Succeeded by (United States) Danielle Scott-Arruda
