= Kisy Nascimento =

Brazilian volleyball player (born 2000)

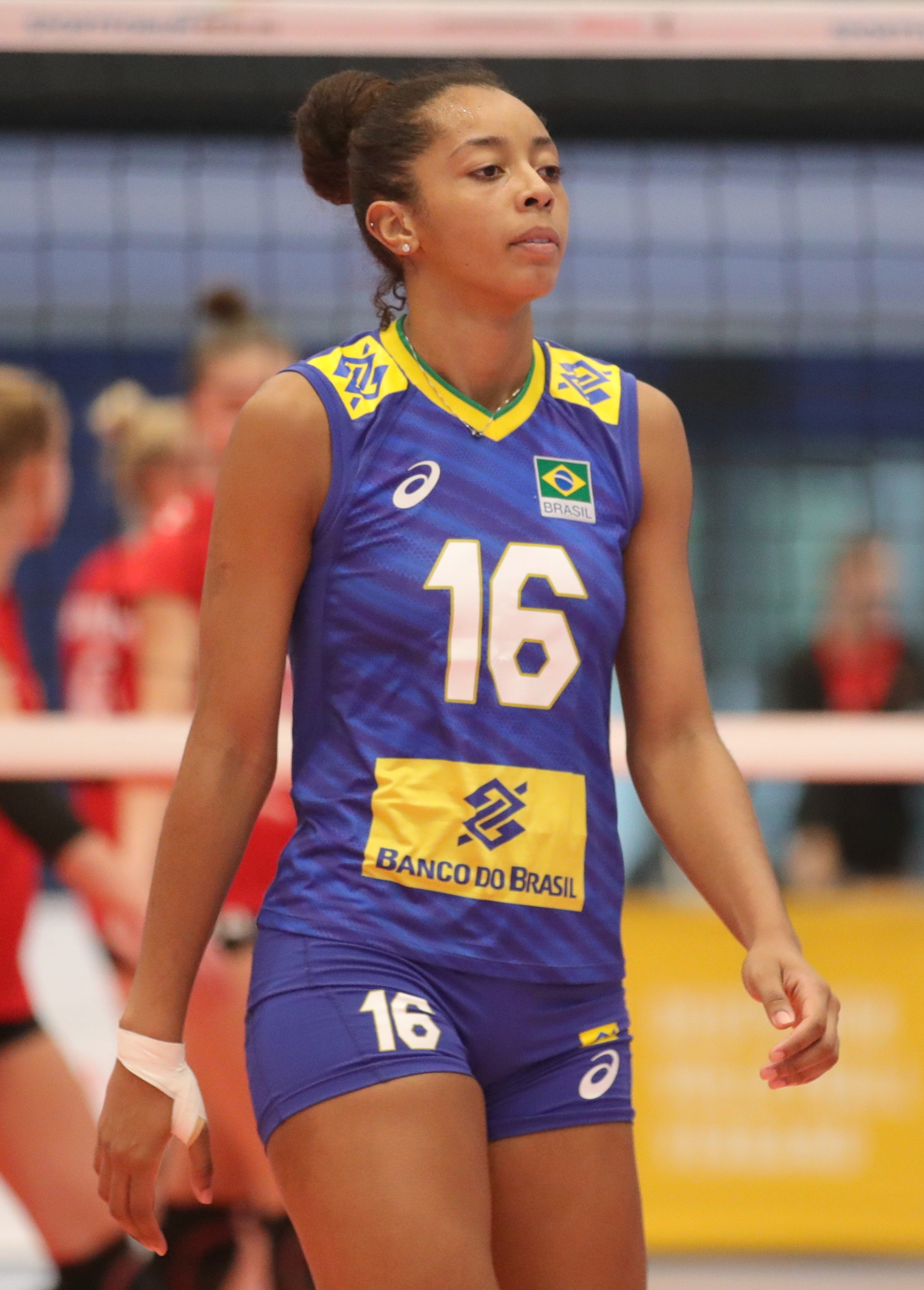

Personal information
- Nationality: Brazil
- Born: January 28, 2000 (age 26); Rio de Janeiro, Brazil
- Height: 1.91 m (6 ft 3 in)

Volleyball information
- Position: Opposite
- Current club: (Russia) Lokomotiv Kaliningrad
- Number: 8

Career
Years	Teams
2014–2019	(Brazil) São Caetano
2019–2021	(Brazil) Barueri
2021-2025	(Brazil) Minas Tênis Clube
2025-	(Russia) Lokomotiv Kaliningrad

National team
2022-	Brazil
Honours
Indoor Volleyball
Representing Brazil
World Championship
Silver medal – second place	2022 Poland/Netherlands	Team
Bronze medal – third place	2025 Thailand	Team
FIVB Nation's League
Silver medal – second place	2022 Ankara	Team
Silver medal – second place	2025 Łódź	Team
Silver medal – second place	2026 Macau

Kisy Nascimento, better known by her first name Kisy, (born 28 January 2000 in Rio de Janeiro, Brazil) is a Brazilian volleyball player and world championship silver medalist who plays as an opposite striker for the Brazil women's national volleyball team and Lokomotiv Kaliningrad.

== Career ==
She began her career with São Caetano in 2013, remaining with the club until 2019. In the 2020–21 season, she transferred to Barueri coached by the Brazilian national team head coach José Roberto Guimarães.

She was announced as a new signing for Minas Tênis Clube in the 2021–22 season, where she finished as runner-up in the 2021 Minas State Championship, the 2021 Brazilian Super Cup, and the 2022 Brazilian Cup, while also reaching the semifinals of the 2021 FIVB Club World Championship in Ankara.

In the 2021–22 Brazilian Superliga A, she became a starter in the final series and was one of the key players in the team's championship victory, earning the MVP of the final. At the end of the season, she competed in the 2022 South American Club Championship in Uberlândia, where her team won the gold medal and she was named Best Opposite and Most Valuable Player (MVP).

On April 21, 2024, after winning the 2023–24 Brazilian Superliga A, she was once again selected as the MVP. And in the next season, she won the Best Opposite os 2024-25 Brazilian Superliga A.

In May 2025, Kisy was announced by Russian team which marked her first experience overseas on the club level. Lokomotiv Kaliningrad.

=== National team ===
She has been called up to the Brazilian national team since her youth years.

On July 17, 2022, Kisy became a silver medalist with Brazil after losing the final of the 2022 FIVB Nations League to Italy by 3 sets to 0 in Ankara, Turkey. The set scores were 25–23, 25–22, 25–22.

On October 15, 2022, Kisy once again became a silver medalist with Brazil after losing the final of the 2022 World Championship to Serbia by 3 sets to 0 in Apeldoorn, the Netherlands. The set scores were 26–24, 25–22, 25–17. She was also part of the Brazilian team in the 2023 VNL.

At the 2025 VNL, Kisy once again won the silver medal with Brazil, after losing another final to Italy.

== Honors ==
=== Clubs ===
- South American Club Championship: 2022, 2024
- Brazilian Superliga: 2021–22, 2023–24
- Brazilian Super Cup: 2023, 2024
- Brazil Cup: 2021, 2023

=== National team ===
- 🥈 2022 FIVB Volleyball Women's World Championship
- 🥈 2022 FIVB Volleyball Women's Nations League
- 🥈 2025 FIVB Volleyball Women's Nations League

=== Individual awards ===
- MVP of Brazilian Superliga 2022–23
- MVP of Brazilian Superliga 2023–24
- MVP of Brazilian Superliga Final 2021–22
- Best opposite of Brazilian Superliga Final 2022–23
- Best opposite of Brazilian Superliga Final 2023–24
- Best opposite of Brazilian Superliga Final 2024–25
- MVP of the 2022 South American Club Championship
- Best opposite of the 2022 South American Club Championship
- Best opposite of the 2023 South American Club Championship
