= Soviet Women's Volleyball Championship =

Soviet Union Championship
- Sport: Volleyball
- Founded: 1933
- First season: 1933
- Folded: 1991
- Administrator: USRRV
- Country: Soviet Union
- Continent: Europe
- Level on pyramid: 1st Level
- Domestic cup: Soviet Union Cup
- International cups: CEV Champions League; CEV Cup; CEV Challenge Cup

The first USSR championships were national teams competitions held in 1933-1936 and were officially called All-Union Volleyball Holidays. Since 1938 the USSR championships were contested by club teams of DSOs and departments, with the exception of 1956, 1959, 1963 and 1967, when the USSR championships were held as part of the Summer Spartakiad of the USSR. In addition, in 1951 and 1952 together with the club teams of Moscow, Leningrad, RSFSR and Ukrainian SSR participated national teams of other Union republics, in the USSR championship of 1976 participated USSR national team and national teams of DSO and departments. The scheme for holding the USSR championships has changed repeatedly. Until 1956, as well as in 1959, 1963 and 1967 the competitions were held in one city. Since 1957 the competitions were held in a round robin system, except 1968, when the final two rounds were played with separation. Games were played in 1-4 rounds, with the 1949 and 1958 championships requiring an ex.

== Winners list ==
Years	Champions	Runners-up	Third Place
1933	Moscow	Kharkov	Dnepropetrovsk
1934	Moscow	Bakou	Dnepropetrovsk; Kharkov; Rostov-Na-Donou
1935	Moscow	Kharkov	Bakou
1936	Moscow	Rostov-Na-Donou; Tiflis	
1937	Not Disputed		
1938	Spartak Moscow	CSKA Moscow	Rot-Front Moscow
1939	Lokomotiv Moscow	Spartak Moscow	Medik Moscow; Naouka Leningrad
1940	Spartak Moscow	Lokomotiv Moscow	Spartak Kharkov
1941	Not Disputed		
1942	Not Disputed		
1943	Not Disputed		
1944	Not Disputed		
1945	Lokomotiv Moscow	Spartak Moscow	Spartak Leningrad
1946	Lokomotiv Moscow	SKIF Moscow	Spartak Leningrad
1947	Dinamo Moscow	Lokomotiv Moscow	SKIF Moscow
1948	Lokomotiv Moscow	Spartak Leningrad	Dinamo Moscow
1949	Lokomotiv Moscow	Dinamo Moscow	Spartak Leningrad.
1950	Lokomotiv Moscow	Spartak Leningrad	Dinamo Moscow
1951	Dinamo Moscow	Lokomotiv Moscow	Spartak Leningrad
1952	Lokomotiv Moscow	Dinamo Moscow	Spartak Leningrad
1953	Dinamo Moscow	Lokomotiv Moscow	Medik Leningrad
1954	Dinamo Moscow	Lokomotiv Moscow	Spartak Leningrad
1955	Dinamo Moscow	Lokomotiv Moscow	Spartak Leningrad
1956	Moscow	Ukraine	Leningrad
1957	Lokomotiv Moscow	Dinamo Moscow	Spartak Leningrad
1958	Metrostroï Moscow	Dinamo Moscow	CSK MO
1959	Leningrad	Moscow	RSS Lettonie
1960	Dinamo Moscow	Lokomotiv Moscow	Daougava Riga
1961	Bourevestnik Ossa	Spartak Leningrad	SKIF Leningrad
1962	Dinamo Moscow	CSKA Moscow	Bourevestnik Ossa
1963	Moscow	Leningrad	RSFSR
1964	Not Disputed		
1965	CSKA Moscow	Lokomotiv Moscow	Dinamo Moscow
1966	CSKA Moscow	Dinamo Moscow	Neftianik Bakou
1967	Moscow	RSS Azerbaïdjan	RSS Ukraine
1968	CSKA Moscow	Spartak Irkoutsk	Bourevestnik Leningrad
1969	CSKA Moscow	Bourevestnik Leningrad	Dinamo Moscow
1970	Dinamo Moscow	Bourevestnik Leningrad	Lokomotiv Moscow
1971	Dinamo Moscow	Lokomotiv Moscow	Bourevestnik Ossa
1972	Dinamo Moscow	CSKA Moscow	Nefttchi Bakou
1973	Dinamo Moscow	CSKA Moscow	Iskra Vorochilovgrad
1974	CSKA Moscow	Dinamo Moscow	Iskra Vorochilovgrad
1975	Dinamo Moscow	Iskra Vorochilovgrad	CSKA Moscow
1976	URSS Team	VC Bourevestnik	VC Dinamo
1977	Dinamo Moscow	CSKA Moscow	Ouralotchka Sverdlovsk
1978	Ouralotchka Sverdlovsk	Iskra Vorochilovgrad	Dinamo Moscow
1979	Ouralotchka Sverdlovsk	CSKA Moscow	Dinamo Moscow
1980	Ouralotchka Sverdlovsk	TTU Leningrad	CSKA Moscow
1981	Ouralotchka Sverdlovsk	Dinamo Moscow	Sokol Kiev
1982	Ouralotchka Sverdlovsk	CSKA Moscow	Medin Ossa
1983	Dinamo Moscow	Medin Ossa	Ouralotchka Sverdlovsk
1984	ADK Alma-Ata	Ouralotchka Sverdlovsk	Medin Ossa
1985	CSKA Moscow	Ouralotchka Sverdlovsk	ADK Alma-Ata
1986	Ouralotchka Sverdlovsk	ADK Alma-Ata	Kommounalnik Minsk
1987	Ouralotchka Sverdlovsk	CSKA Moscow	Kommounalnik Minsk
1988	Ouralotchka Sverdlovsk	ADK Alma-Ata	CSKA Moscow
1989	Ouralotchka Sverdlovsk	ADK Alma-Ata	Orbita Zaporojie
1990	Ouralotchka Sverdlovsk	ADK Alma-Ata	BZBK Bakou
1991	Ouralotchka Sverdlovsk	ADK Alma-Ata	Ouralotchka-2

== See also ==
- Volleyball in Russia
- Russian Women's Volleyball Super League
