= Vadim Pankov =

Russian volleyball coach (born 1964)

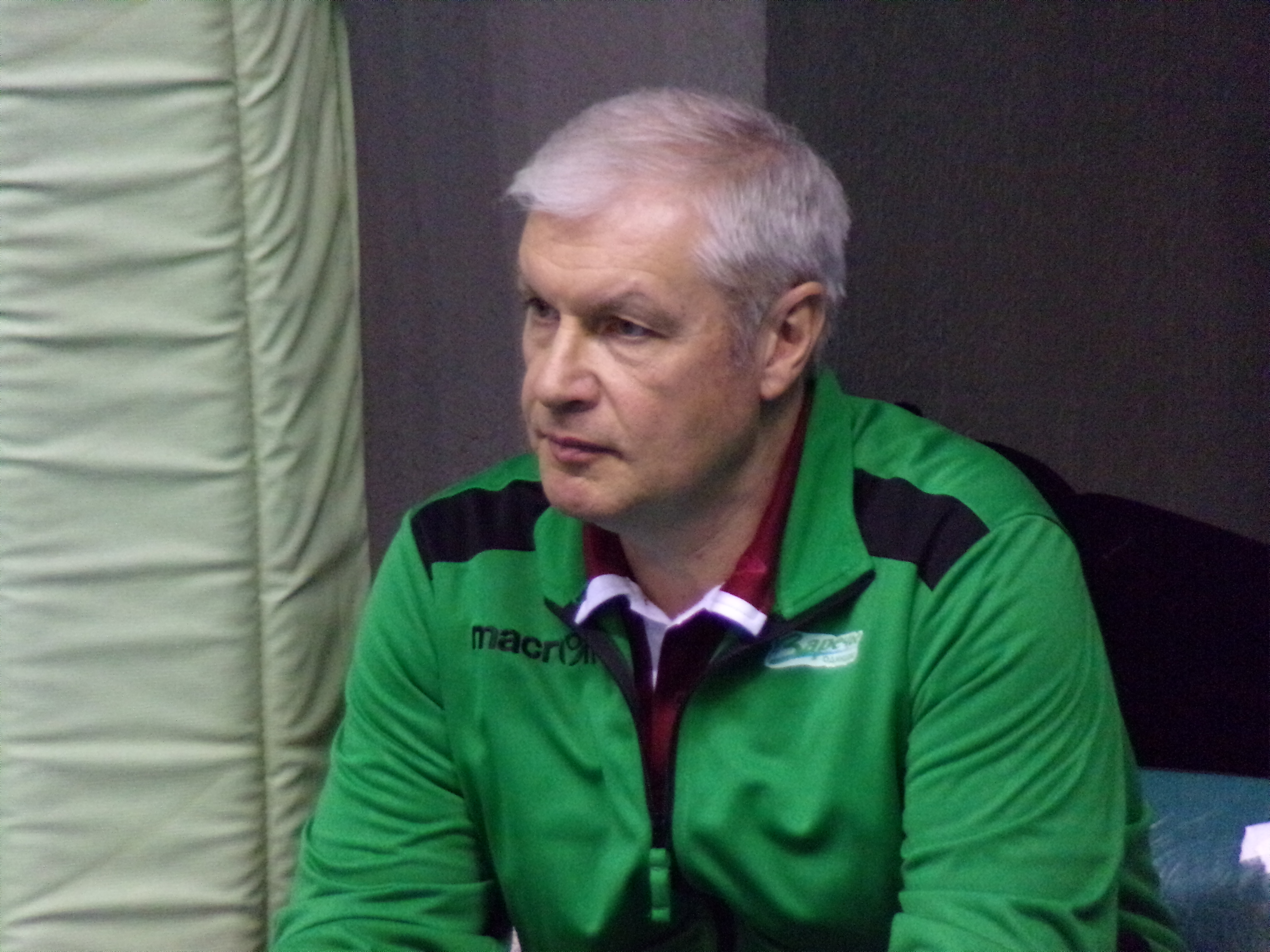
- Pankov in 2018

Personal information
- Nationality: Russian
- Born: 1 June 1964 (age 62) Moscow, Russian SSR, Soviet Union

Volleyball information
- Position: Head coach
- Current club: VC Zarechye Odintsovo / Russia women's national volleyball team
Honours
Coach for Women's volleyball

Vadim Anatolyevich Pankov (Russian: Вадим Анатольевич Панков; born 1 June 1964, in Moscow) is a Soviet and Russian volleyball coach, head coach of VC Zarechye Odintsovo (since 2007) and Russia women's national volleyball team (since 2018).

He was awarded the Medal of the Order For Merit to the Fatherland II class (1999) and the Honored Coach of Russia (2011).
