= Olga Efimova =

Russian volleyball player

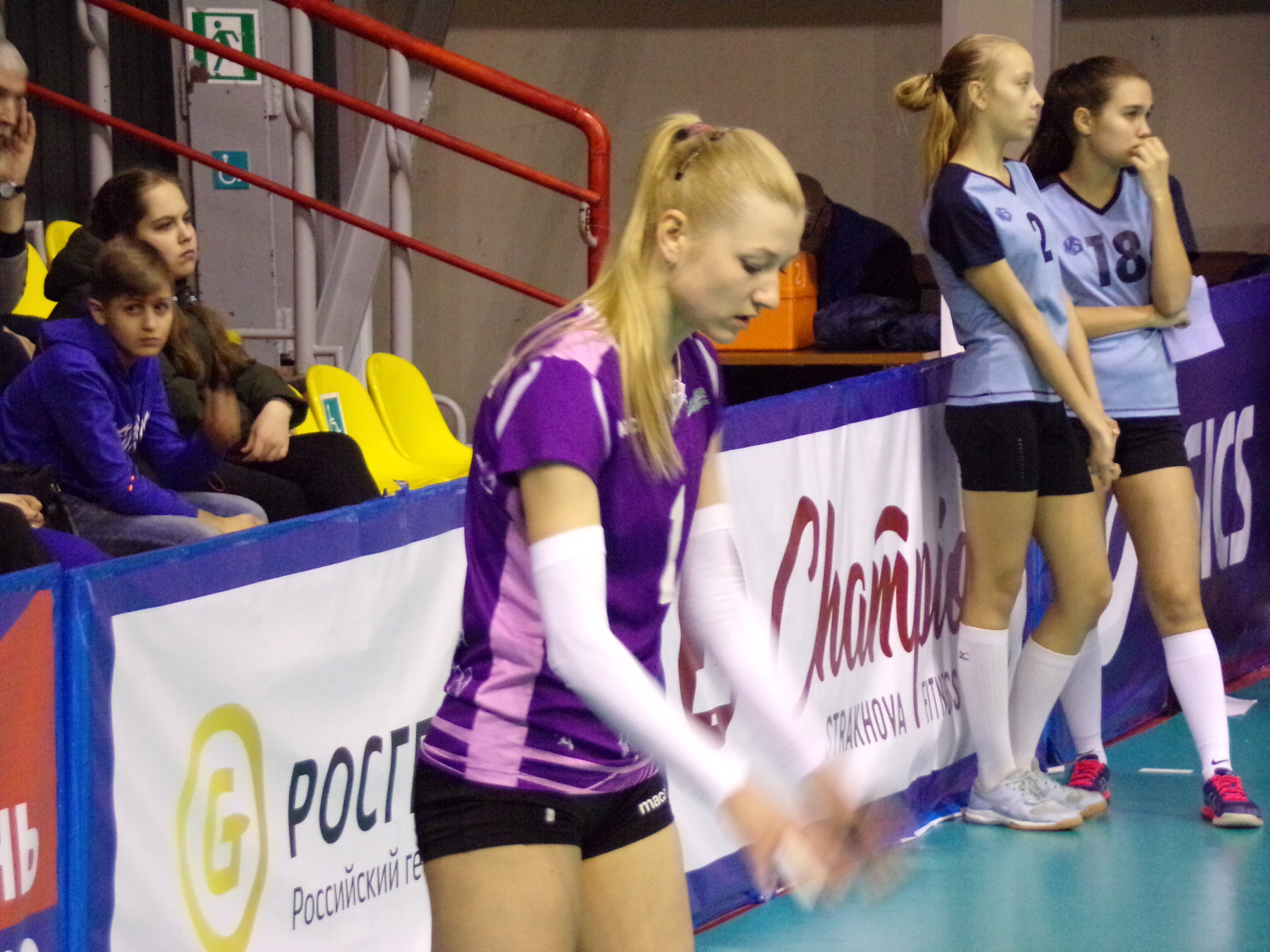

Personal information
- Nationality: Russian
- Born: 6 January 1990 (age 36)
- Height: 1.81 m (5 ft 11 in)
- Weight: 68 kg (150 lb)
- Spike: 291 cm (115 in)
- Block: 273 cm (107 in)

Volleyball information
- Position: Outside hitter

Career
- Years: Team
- 2015: VC Zarechie Odintsovo

National team
- Years: Team
- 2015–: Russia
Honours
Women's volleyball
Representing Russia
World Grand Prix
Silver medal – second place	2015 Omaha

Olga Efimova (born 6 January 1990) is a Russian volleyball player, who plays as an outside hitter.

She is a member of the Russia women's national volleyball team and participated at the 2015 FIVB Volleyball Women's World Cup in Japan. At club level she played for VC Zarechie Odintsovo in 2015.
