= Lesya Makhno =

Russian volleyball player (born 1981)

Personal information
- Full name: Lesya Anatolievna Makhno
- Nationality: Russia
- Born: 4 September 1981 (age 45); Poltava Oblast, Ukrainian SSR
- Height: 1.82 m (5 ft 11 1/2 in)
- Weight: 73 kg (161 lb)

Volleyball information
- Current club: Dynamo Kazan

National team
2010-2012	Russia
Honours
Women's volleyball
Representing Russia
World Championship
Gold medal – first place	2010 Japan	Team

Lesya Anatolievna Makhno (Ukrainian: Ле́ся Анато́ліївна Махно́, Russian: Ле́ся Анато́льевна Махно́; born 4 September 1981) is a Russian volleyball player. She was a member of the national team that won the gold medal at the 2010 World Championship.
