= Russian Women's Volleyball Super League =

Professional volleyball league in Russia

- Sport: Volleyball
- Founded: 1991; 35 years ago
- No. of teams: 14
- Country: Russia
- Confederation: CEV
- Most recent champions: VK Lokomotiv Kaliningrad (3rd title)
- Most titles: Uralochka Ekaterinburg (14 titles)
- Relegation to: Major League A
- Domestic cups: Russian Cup; Russian SuperCup
- Website: volley.ru

The Russian Women's Volleyball Super League, is the highest professional women's volleyball league in Russia. It is organized and administered by the Russian Volleyball Federation.

== History ==
The dissolution of the Soviet Union in late 1991 brought an end to all sports leagues played in the Soviet Union, including the Soviet Women's Volleyball Championship. The national league was created by the Russian Volleyball Federation as a continuation of the Soviet Championships. The 1991–92 inaugural season had the participation of clubs based in the Russian Commonwealth and Yugoslavia. From the second season onwards only clubs based in Russia were allowed to compete.

This is how the League changed its name and structure through time.

Years	1st Division	2nd Division	3rd Division	4th Division	5th Division
1991–1992	Major League	First League	–	–	–
1992–1995	Major League A	Major League B	First League	Second League	–
1995–1996	Super League	Major League A	Major League B	First League	Second League
1996–2001	Super League	Premier League ("Europe" and "Siberia and Far East" zones)	First League ("Europe" and "Siberia and Far East" zones)	Second League	–
2001–2011	Super League	Major League A ("Europe" and "Siberia and Far East" zones)	Major League B ("Europe" and "Siberia and Far East" zones)	First League	–
2011–	Super League	Major League A	Major League B ("Europe" and "Siberia and Far East" zones)	–	–

== Teams ==
The following clubs are competing in the 2020–21 season:

2020-21 Super League teams location.

Team	Location	Venue	Capacity
Dinamo-Ak Bars	Kazan	Kazan Volleyball Centre	5,000
Dinamo Krasnodar	Krasnodar	Palais des Sports Olympus	3,000
Dinamo Moscow	Moscow	Dynamo Volleyball Arena	3,500
Dinamo-Metar	Chelyabinsk	Metar-Sport	2,500
Leningradka	Saint Petersburg	SPbGMTU Sports Complex	2,000
Lokomotiv Kaliningrad	Kaliningrad	Amberarena	7,000
Proton	Balakovo	FOK Zviozdny	2,500
Uralochka-NTMK	Yekaterinburg	Palace of Sports Yekaterinburg	5,000
Minchanka Minsk	Minsk, Belarus	Sports Palace Uruchye	3,000
Yenisei	Krasnoyarsk	Ivan Yarygin Sports Palace	3,300
Zarechie Odintsovo	Odintsovo	Volleyball-Sports Complex	2,200
Sparta	Nizhny Novgorod	Sports Palace North Star	800
Lipetsk	Lipetsk	Sports School of Lipetsk	
Tulitsa	Tula	Manege of CS Arsenal	

== Results ==
Season	Winner	Runner-up	Third
1991–92	Uralochka Yekaterinburg	Mladost Zagreb	CSKA Moscow
1992–93	Uralochka Yekaterinburg	Yunezis Yekaterinburg	CSKA Moscow
1993–94	Uralochka Yekaterinburg	CSKA Moscow	Uralochka Yekaterinburg II
1994–95	Uralochka Yekaterinburg	CSKA Moscow	Uralochka Yekaterinburg II
1995–96	Uralochka Yekaterinburg	CSKA Moscow	Uraltransbank Yekaterinburg
1996–97	Uralochka Yekaterinburg	CSKA Moscow	Uraltransbank Yekaterinburg
1997–98	Uralochka Yekaterinburg	Uraltransbank Yekaterinburg	CSKA Moscow
1998–99	Uralochka Yekaterinburg	Uraltransbank Yekaterinburg	Fakel Novy Urengoy
1999–00	Uralochka Yekaterinburg	Uraltransbank Yekaterinburg	CSKA Moscow
2000–01	Uralochka Yekaterinburg	Universitet Belgorod	Uraltransbank Yekaterinburg
2001–02	Uralochka NTMK Yekaterinburg	Aeroflot-Malakhit Yekaterinburg	Universitet Belgorod
2002–03	Uralochka NTMK Yekaterinburg	Universitet Belgorod	Balakovskaia AES Balakovo
2003–04	Uralochka NTMK Yekaterinburg	Dinamo Moskovskaya	Balakovskaia AES Balakovo
2004–05	Uralochka NTMK Yekaterinburg	Dinamo Moscow	Balakovskaia AES Balakovo
2005–06	Dinamo Moscow	Zarechie Odintsovo	Dinamo Moskovskaya
2006–07	Dinamo Moscow	CSKA Moscow	Samorodok Khabarovsk
2007–08	Zarechie Odintsovo	Dinamo Moscow	Uralochka NTMK Yekaterinburg
2008–09	Dinamo Moscow	Zarechie Odintsovo	Uralochka NTMK Yekaterinburg
2009–10	Zarechie Odintsovo	Dinamo Moscow	Dinamo Krasnodar
2010–11	Dinamo Kazan	Dinamo Moscow	Dinamo Krasnodar
2011–12	Dinamo Kazan	Dinamo Moscow	Uralochka NTMK Yekaterinburg
2012–13	Dinamo Kazan	Dinamo Moscow	Omichka Omsk
2013–14	Dinamo Kazan	Dinamo Moscow	Omichka Omsk
2014–15	Dinamo Kazan	Dinamo Moscow	Uralochka NTMK Yekaterinburg
2015–16	Dinamo Moscow	Uralochka NTMK Yekaterinburg	Dinamo Krasnodar
2016–17	Dinamo Moscow	Dinamo Kazan	Yenisey Krasnoyarsk
2017–18	Dinamo Moscow	Dinamo Kazan	Uralochka NTMK Yekaterinburg
2018–19	Dinamo Moscow	Lokomotiv Kaliningrad	Uralochka NTMK Yekaterinburg
2019–20	Dinamo Kazan	Lokomotiv Kaliningrad	Uralochka NTMK Yekaterinburg
2020–21	Lokomotiv Kaliningrad	Dinamo Moscow	Dinamo Kazan
2021–22	Lokomotiv Kaliningrad	Uralochka NTMK Yekaterinburg	Dinamo Moscow
2022–23	Dinamo Moscow	Lokomotiv Kaliningrad	Proton Saratov
2023–24	Dinamo Kazan	Lokomotiv Kaliningrad	Leningradka Saint Petersburg
2024-25	Lokomotiv Kaliningrad	Dinamo Kazan	Zarechie Odintsovo
2025-26	Dinamo Kazan	Zarechie Odintsovo	Dinamo Moscow

== Titles by club ==
Club	Winners	Runners-up
Uralochka NTMK Yekaterinburg	14 (1991–92, 1992–93, 1993–94, 1994–95, 1995–96, 1996–97, 1997–98, 1998–99, 1999–00, 2000–01, 2001–02, 2002–03, 2003–04, 2004–05)	2 (2015–16, 2021–22)
Dinamo Moscow	8 (2005–06, 2006–07, 2008–09, 2015–16, 2016–17, 2017–18, 2018–19, 2022–23)	8 (2004–05, 2007–08, 2009–10, 2010–11, 2011–12, 2012–13, 2013–14, 2014–15)
Dinamo Kazan	8 (2010–11, 2011–12, 2012–13, 2013–14, 2014–15, 2019–20, 2023–24, 2025–26)	3 (2016–17, 2017–18, 2024-2025)
Lokomotiv Kaliningrad	3 (2020–21, 2021–22, 2024-2025)	4 (2018–19, 2019–20, 2022–23, 2023–24)
Zarechie Odintsovo	2 (2007–08, 2009–10)	3 (2005–06, 2008–09, 2025–26)

== All-time team records ==
Various statistics since 2007/2008

(Based on W=2 pts and D=1 pts)

	Team	S	Firs	Best	Pts	MP	W	L	GF	GA	diff
1	WVC Dynamo Moscow	15	2007/2008	1st	671	370	301	69	976	381	+595
2	Uralochka NTMK Ekaterinburg	15	2007/2008	2nd	580	366	214	152	776	603	+173
3	Dinamo Kazan	13	2009/2010	1st	573	317	256	61	830	316	+514
4	Zarechie Odintsovo	15	2007/2008	1st	543	351	192	159	706	636	+70
5	Dinamo Krasnodar	13	2009/2010	3rd	468	296	172	124	604	491	+113
6	Proton Volleyball Club Balakovo	14	2007/2008	-	424	314	110	204	457	699	-242
7	Leningradka Saint-Petersburg	12	2007/2008	-	358	261	97	164	415	566	-151
8	Avtodor-Metar Chelyabinsk	13	2007/2008	-	353	279	74	205	334	688	-354
9	Omichka Omsk	9	2007/2008	3rd	348	222	126	96	450	388	+62
10	Lokomotiv Kaliningrad	8	2007/2008	2nd	271	173	98	75	347	306	+41
11	Yenisei Krasnoyarsk	8	2012/2013	3rd	232	164	68	96	281	336	-55
12	Torch Novy Urengoi	5	2008/2009	-	176	130	46	84	203	284	-81
13	Samorodok Khabarovsk	5	2007/2008	4th	173	125	48	77	190	270	-80
14	VC Sakhalin	4	2016/2017	-	137	99	38	61	152	224	-72
15	Indesit Lipetsk	5	2007/2008	-	137	103	34	69	160	234	-74
16	Tyumen Tyumen	3	2011/2012	-	100	74	26	48	120	169	-49
17	Universitet Belgorod	3	2007/2008	-	100	73	27	46	115	165	-50
18	Minchanka Minsk (BLR)	4	2018/2019	-	99	73	26	47	110	167	-57
19	Severstal Cherepovets	2	2011/2012	-	65	50	15	35	68	120	-52
20	Ufimochka UGNTU	2	2012/2013	-	56	46	10	36	52	121	-69
21	Voronezh	2	2014/2015	-	46	41	5	36	31	113	-82
22	VC Tulitsa	2	2020/2021	-	38	28	10	18	48	63	-15
23	Nizhniy Novgorod	3	2018/2019	-	38	29	9	20	41	68	-27
24	Hara Morin Ulan-Ude	1	2013/2014	-	32	24	8	16	33	58	-25
25	CSKA Moscow	1	2007/2008	-	30	20	10	10	42	39	+3
26	Kazanochka Kazan	1	2007/2008	-	24	20	4	16	18	54	-36

== Lyudmila Buldakova award ==
The award for best player of the Super League was created by the Russian Volleyball Federation in 2006 and named after two time Olympic gold medallist Lyudmila Buldakova, a former player who died that year. The winner is voted by the head coaches of the league's teams.

Season	Winner	Club
2006–07	(Ukraine) Lyubov Yagodina	WVC CSKA Moscow
2007–08	(Russia) Lyubov Sokolova	Zarechie Odintsovo
2008–09	(Russia) Yevgeniya Estes	Uralochka-NTMK
2009–10	(Russia) Tatiana Kosheleva	Zarechie Odintsovo
2010–11	(Russia) Yekaterina Gamova	Dinamo Kazan
2011–12	(Germany) Angelina Grün	Dinamo Moscow
2012–13	(Russia) Yekaterina Gamova	Dinamo Kazan
2013–14	(Russia) Yekaterina Gamova	Dinamo Kazan
2014–15	(Russia) Nataliya Goncharova	Dinamo Moscow
2015–16	(Russia) Nataliya Goncharova	Dinamo Moscow
2016–17	(Russia) Nataliya Goncharova	Dinamo Moscow
2017–18	(Russia) Nataliya Goncharova	Dinamo Moscow
2018–19	(Russia) Nataliya Goncharova	Dinamo Moscow

== See also ==
- Volleyball in Russia
- Soviet Women's Volleyball Championship
