= WVC CSKA Moscow =

Russian volleyball club

- Full name: Women's Volleyball Club CSKA Moscow
- Short name: CSKA Moscow
- Founded: 1936; 89 years ago
- Dissolved: 2008; 17 years ago
- Ground: MVK CSKA (Capacity: 5500)
- League: Russian Women's Volleyball Super League

Uniforms
Home	Away

WVC CSKA Moscow was a Russian professional women's volleyball club. It played in the Super League. The club won 3 CEV Women's Champions Leagues.

In 2008, WVC CSKA Moscow was disbanded due to financial problems.

== Titles ==
=== Domestic competitions ===
Soviet Union

- USSR Championship (6)
  1965, 1966, 1968, 1969, 1974, 1985
  1938, 1962, 1972, 1973, 1977, 1979, 1982, 1987
  1958, 1975, 1980, 1988
- USSR Cup Winners (2)
  1972, 1984

Russia

- Russian Super League:
  1994, 1995, 1996, 1997, 2007
  1992, 1993, 1998, 2000.
- Russian Cup: 3
  1998, 2001, 2005

=== International competitions ===
- CEV Champions League: 3
  1965-66, 1966-67, 1985-86
  1967-68, 1968-69
- Cup Winners Cup: 4
  1972-73, 1973-74, 1987-88, 1997-98
  1974-75
  1988-89, 1995-96, 1996-97
- Top Teams Cup:
  2006-2007
- Women's Top Volley International:1
  1998 (December)
  1995
