= Yantarny Sports Palace =

Indoor sporting arena located in Russia

- Amber Sports Palace
- Interactive map of Yantarny Sports Palace
- Full name: Yantarny Sports Palace
- Location: Soglasiya, 39, Kaliningrad, Russia
- Capacity: 7,000

Construction
- Opened: 2009

Tenants
- VK Lokomotiv Kaliningrad; Russian men's national volleyball team Russian women's national volleyball team

Yantarny Sports Palace, also known as Amber Sports Palace (Russian: Янтарный Дворец Спорта, Dvorets Sporta Yantarny) is a multi-purpose indoor arena that is located in Kaliningrad, Russia. It is a part of the Yantarny Sports Complex, which contains 10 sports halls, and 2 indoor arenas.

The two indoor arenas consist of the Yantarny Sports Complex Small Arena, which has a seating capacity of 1,000 people, and Amber Arena, which has a seating capacity of 7,000 people. Amber Arena can be used to host numerous different events, such as: exhibitions, concerts, gymnastics, volleyball, martial arts tournaments, futsal, handball, and basketball.

== History ==
Amber Arena opened in 2009. The VK Lokomotiv Kaliningrad women's volleyball team has used the facility as its home arena. The arena has also been used as a home venue by both the senior Russian men's national volleyball team and the senior Russian women's national volleyball team, and it also hosted several major FIVB international volleyball tournaments. During the 2019–20 season, the arena was used as a substituent home arena of the VTB United League club CSKA Moscow, for two EuroLeague games.
