= Russian Women's Volleyball Cup =

Sport competition

- Sport: Volleyball
- Founded: 1993
- Country: Russia
- Most recent champion: Lokomotiv Kaliningrad
- Website: https://volley.ru/pages/80/

The Russian Women's Volleyball Cup in ( Russian : Кубок России по волейболу среди женщин ) is the second most important tournament after the national championship in a series of competitions for women's volleyball clubs in Russia . It has been held since 1993, and managed by the Russian Volleyball Federation.

== Winners list ==
Years	Champions	Score	Runners-Up
1993	CMS Chelyabinsk		Dinamo Krasnodar
1994	Dinamo Krasnodar	3 - 1 (?)	Metar Chelyabinsk
1995	VC Zarechye Odintsovo		Metar Chelyabinsk
1996	Metar Chelyabinsk	3 - 1 (?)	VC Zarechye Odintsovo
1997	Metar Chelyabinsk	3 - 2 (15-8, 14-16, 2-15, 15-12, 15-10)	CSKA Moscow
1998	CSKA Moscow	3 - 0 (?)	Iskra Samara
1999	AES Balakovo	3 - 1 (?)	CSKA Moscow
2000	Iskra Samara	3 - 2 (?)	CSKA Moscow
2001	CSKA Moscow	3 - 1 (25-18, 23-25, 25-17, 25-22)	Stinol Lipetsk
2002	VC Zarechye Odintsovo	3 - 0 (-)	Samorodok Khabarovsk
2003	VC Zarechye Odintsovo	3 - 0 (25-20, 25-22, 25-20)	CSKA Moscow
2004	VC Zarechye Odintsovo	3 - 1 (25-23, 25-21, 18-25, 25-21)	Dynamo Moscow
2005	CSKA Moscow	3 - 2 (13-25, 22-25, 25-19, 25-14, 15-12)	Samorodok Khabarovsk
2006	VC Zarechye Odintsovo	3 - 0 (25-23, 30-28, 25-21)	CSKA Moscow
2007	VC Zarechye Odintsovo	3 - 2 (20-25, 24-26, 25-23, 25-19, 15-13)	Dinamo Moscow
2008	Universitet Belgorod	3 - 1 (25-21, 25-19, 16-25, 25-21)	Dynamo Moscow
2009	Dynamo Moscow	3 - 2 (25-20, 25-17, 19-25, 20-25, 15-11)	VC Zarechye Odintsovo
2010	Dinamo Kazan	3 - 0 (25-13, 25-18, 25-22)	Dinamo Krasnodar
2011	Dynamo Moscow	3 - 1 (31-29, 15-25, 28-26, 25-23)	Dinamo Kazan
2012	Dinamo Kazan	3 - 0 (25-15, 25-17, 25-21)	Dynamo Moscow
2013	Dinamo Moscow	3 - 1 (25-22, 23-25, 25-23, 25-22)	Dinamo Kazan
2014	Dinamo Krasnodar	3 - 2 (26-28, 25-22, 25-20, 19-25, 15-11)	Omichka Omsk
2015	Dinamo Krasnodar	3 - 1 (25-21, 19-25, 25-22, 25-16)	Dinamo Kazan
2016	Dinamo Kazan	3 - 1 (25-23, 25-20, 26-28, 25-15)	Dynamo Moscow
2017	Dinamo Kazan	3 - 0 (25-20, 25-18, 25-20)	VC Yenisey Krasnoyarsk
2018	Dynamo Moscow	3 - 0 (25-11, 25-17, 25-13)	VC Yenisey Krasnoyarsk
2019	Dinamo Kazan	3 - 1 (25-19, 23-25, 25-16, 25-19)	Dynamo Moscow
2020	Dinamo Kazan	3 - 1 (22-25, 25-21, 25-15, 25-22)	Dynamo Moscow
2021	Dinamo Kazan	3 - 0 (25-14, 26-24, 25-17)	Lokomotiv Kaliningrad
2022	Dynamo Moscow	3 - 0 (25-15, 25-23, 25-20)	Lokomotiv Kaliningrad
2023	Dynamo Moscow	3 - 0 (25-17, 25-20, 25-21)	Leningradka
2024	Dinamo Kazan	3 - 2 (23-25, 22-25, 25-13, 25-17, 15-13)	Leningradka
2025	Lokomotiv Kaliningrad	3 - 2 (25-12, 23-25, 25-15, 20-25, 15-10)	Dinamo Kazan

== Titles by club ==
Rk.	Club	Titles	City	Years Won
1	Dynamo Kazan	8	Kazan	2010, 2012, 2016, 2017, 2019, 2020, 2021, 2024
2	VC Zarechye Odintsovo	6	Odintsovo	1995, 2002, 2003, 2004, 2006, 2007
=	Dynamo Moscow	6	Moscow	2009, 2011, 2013, 2018, 2022, 2023
4	Avtodor-Metar	3	Chelyabinsk	1993, 1996, 1997
=	Dinamo Krasnodar	3	Krasnodar	1994, 2014, 2015
=	CSKA Moscow	3	Moscow	1998, 2001, 2005
7	AES Balakovo	1	Balakovo	1999
=	Iskra Samara	1	Samara	2000
=	Universitet Belgorod	1	Belgorod	2008
=	Lokomotiv Kaliningrad	1	Kaliningrad	2025
