= Tatiana Kosheleva =

Russian volleyball player

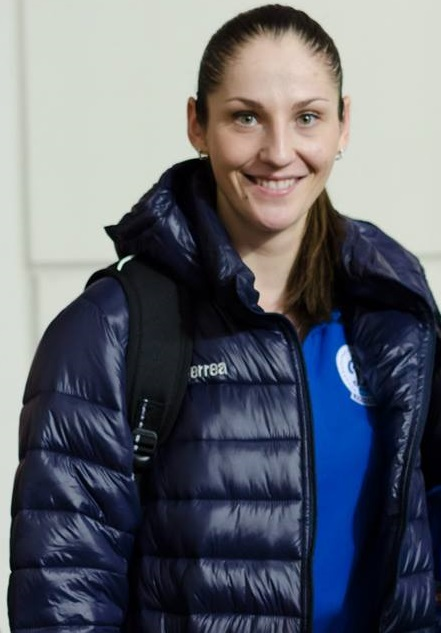

Personal information
- Full name: Tatiana Sergeyevna Kosheleva
- Nickname: Tanya
- Nationality: Russian
- Born: 23 December 1988 (age 37); Minsk, Byelorussian SSR, Soviet Union
- Height: 1.92 m (6 ft 4 in)
- Weight: 77 kg (170 lb)
- Spike: 315 cm (124 in)
- Block: 305 cm (120 in)

Volleyball information
- Position: Outside hitter
- Current club: Megabox Volley Vallefoglia
- Number: 15

Career
Years	Teams
2004–2007; 2007–2010; 2010–2011; 2011–2012; 2012; 2013–2014; 2014–2016; 2016–2017; 2017–2018; 2018–2019; 2019–2019; 2019–2020; 2020–2020; 2020–2021; 2021–	Dinamo Moscow; Zarechie Odintsovo; Dinamo Kazan; Dinamo Krasnodar; Dinamo Kazan; Dinamo Moscow; Dinamo Krasnodar; Eczacıbaşı VitrA; Galatasaray Daikin; SESC Rio; Pallavolo Scandicci; Guangdong Evergrande VC; Lokomotiv Kaliningrad; Galatasaray HDI Sigorta; Megabox Volley Vallefoglia

National team
2007–2021	Russia
Honours
Women's volleyball
Representing Russia
World Championship
Gold medal – first place	2010 Japan
World Grand Prix
Silver medal – second place	2009 Tokyo
Silver medal – second place	2015 Omaha
Bronze medal – third place	2014 Tokyo
European Championship
Gold medal – first place	2013 Germany/Switzerland
Gold medal – first place	2015 Netherlands/Belgium
Bronze medal – third place	2007 Belgium/Luxembourg

Tatiana Sergeyevna Kosheleva (Russian: Татья́на Серге́евна Ко́шелева, born 23 December 1988) is a Russian volleyball player. She was a member of the Russia women's national volleyball team that won the gold medal at the 2010 World Championship, the 2013 European Championship and the 2015 European Championship.

== Career ==
=== Club ===
At club level, she played for Dinamo Moscow, Zarechie Odintsovo, Dinamo Kazan and Dinamo Krasnodar before joining Eczacıbaşı VitrA in 2016.

Kosheleva led Dinamo Krasnodar with 37 points in the final match to win the 2014–15 CEV Cup gold medal and the Most Valuable Player award. She scored 245 points leading all scorers in the six 2014/15 European Cups. Her team earned a wild card from the FIVB to play the 2015 FIVB Club World Championship, the club reached the final of the tournament and eventually lost the Turkish side Eczacibasi VitrA. She was awarded Best Outside Spiker.

=== Galatasaray (return) ===
On 20 October 2020, Galatasaray HDI Sigorta reintroduced former player Kosheleva. She will fight with the number 14 jersey in the 2020–21 season.

=== National ===
As a member of the Russia women's national volleyball team, she participated in many competitions including the 2010 Montreux Volley Masters, the FIVB Volleyball World Grand Prix (in 2007, 2009, 2011, 2013, 2014, 2015, 2016), the European Championships (in 2007, 2009, 2013, 2015), the World Championships (in 2010, 2014), the 2015 FIVB Volleyball Women's World Cup in Japan, and the Olympic Games of London 2012 and Rio 2016.

She was won the Best Spiker award of the 2010 World Championship. Besides the gold medal won at the 2013 European Championship, she was awarded the Most Valuable Player of the event. Two years later at the 2015 European Championship, she got one better by winning the championship, the Most Valuable Player award and the Best Outside Spiker award.

== Awards ==
=== Individuals ===
- 2009 FIVB World Grand Prix "Best spiker"
- 2010 Montreux Volley Masters "Best spiker"
- 2010 World Championship "Best spiker"
- 2013 European Championship "Most valuable player"
- 2013-14 Russian Cup "Most valuable player"
- 2014–15 CEV Cup "Most valuable player"
- 2015 FIVB Club World Championship "Best outside spiker"
- 2015 FIVB Women's World Cup "Best outside spiker"
- 2015 European Championship "Best outside spikers"
- 2015 European Championship "Most valuable player"
- 2016 FIVB Club World Championship "Best outside spiker"

=== National team ===
==== Junior ====
- 2005 FIVB Volleyball Girls' U18 World Championship – Silver medal

==== Senior ====
- 2007 European Championship – Bronze medal
- 2008 Boris Yeltsin Cup – Gold medal
- 2009 Boris Yeltsin Cup – Gold medal
- 2009 FIVB World Grand Prix – Silver medal
- 2010 Boris Yeltsin Cup – Gold medal
- 2010 FIVB World Championship – Gold medal
- 2013 European Championship – Gold medal
- 2014 FIVB World Grand Prix – Bronze medal
- 2015 FIVB World Grand Prix – Silver medal
- 2015 European Championship – Gold medal

=== Clubs ===
- 2007 Russian Cup – Gold medal, with Zarechie Odintsovo
- 2007–08 CEV Champions League – Silver medal, with Zarechie Odintsovo
- 2007–08 Russian Championship – Gold medal, with Zarechie Odintsovo
- 2008–09 Russian Championship – Silver medal, with Zarechie Odintsovo
- 2009 Russian Cup – Silver medal, with Zarechie Odintsovo
- 2009–10 Russian Championship – Gold medal, with Zarechie Odintsovo
- 2010 Russian Cup – Gold medal, with Dinamo Kazan
- 2010–11 Russian Championship – Gold medal, with Dinamo Kazan
- 2012–13 Russian Championship – Silver medal, with Dinamo Moscow
- 2013 Russian Cup – Gold medal, with Dinamo Moscow
- 2013–14 Russian Championship – Silver medal, with Dinamo Moscow
- 2014 Russian Cup – Gold medal, with Dinamo Krasnodar
- 2014–15 CEV Cup – Gold medal, with Dinamo Krasnodar
- 2015 Russian Cup – Gold medal, with Dinamo Krasnodar
- 2015 FIVB Club World Championship – Silver medal, with Dinamo Krasnodar
- 2015–16 CEV Cup – Gold medal, with Dinamo Krasnodar
- 2016 FIVB Club World Championship – Gold medal, with Eczacıbaşı VitrA

Awards
Preceded by (Cuba) Daimí Ramírez	Best Spiker of FIVB World Grand Prix; 2009	Succeeded by (Brazil) Jaqueline Carvalho
Preceded by (Cuba) Rosir Calderón	Best Spiker of FIVB World Championship; 2010	Succeeded by Finish
Preceded by (Serbia) Jovana Brakočević	Most Valuable Player of European Championship; 2013; 2015	Succeeded by (Serbia) Tijana Bošković
Preceded by (Cuba) Kenia Carcaces and (Brazil) Suelle Oliveira	Best Outside Spiker of FIVB Club World Championship; 2015 with (Brazil) Fernanda Garay; 2016 with (China) Ting Zhu	Succeeded by (China) Ting Zhu and (Brazil) Gabriela Guimarães
