= Kazan Volleyball Centre =

Sports complex in Kazan, Russia

Volleyball Centre of Saint Petersburg
- Interactive map of Volleyball Centre of Saint Petersburg
- Address: 1 Midkhat Bulatov str., Kazan, Russia
- Coordinates: 55°44′02.25″N 49°10′21.23″E
- Capacity: 5,000 (main arena); 700 (minor arena)
- Surface: Parquet

Construction
- Opened: May 2010
- Cost: $14 million
- Architect: Tatinvestgrazhdanproject

Tenants
- Dinamo Kazan; Zenit-Kazan

The Volleyball Centre of Saint Petersburg (Russian: Центр волейбола "Санкт-Петербург"), also known as Kazan Volleyball Centre, is a sports complex in Kazan, Russia. It's 13,000 square metres consists of two indoor arenas, a main with capacity for 5,000 spectators and a minor with capacity for 700 spectators. It is also equipped with supporting facilities such as gyms and conference rooms. It was opened in May 2010 and had a construction cost of 790 million rubles (US$26 million).

It is primarily used for volleyball and is the home arena of the VC Zenit-Kazan and Dinamo Kazan. The arena was one of the venues used in the 2013 Summer Universiade.
