= Nataliya Goncharova (volleyball) =

Russian volleyball player

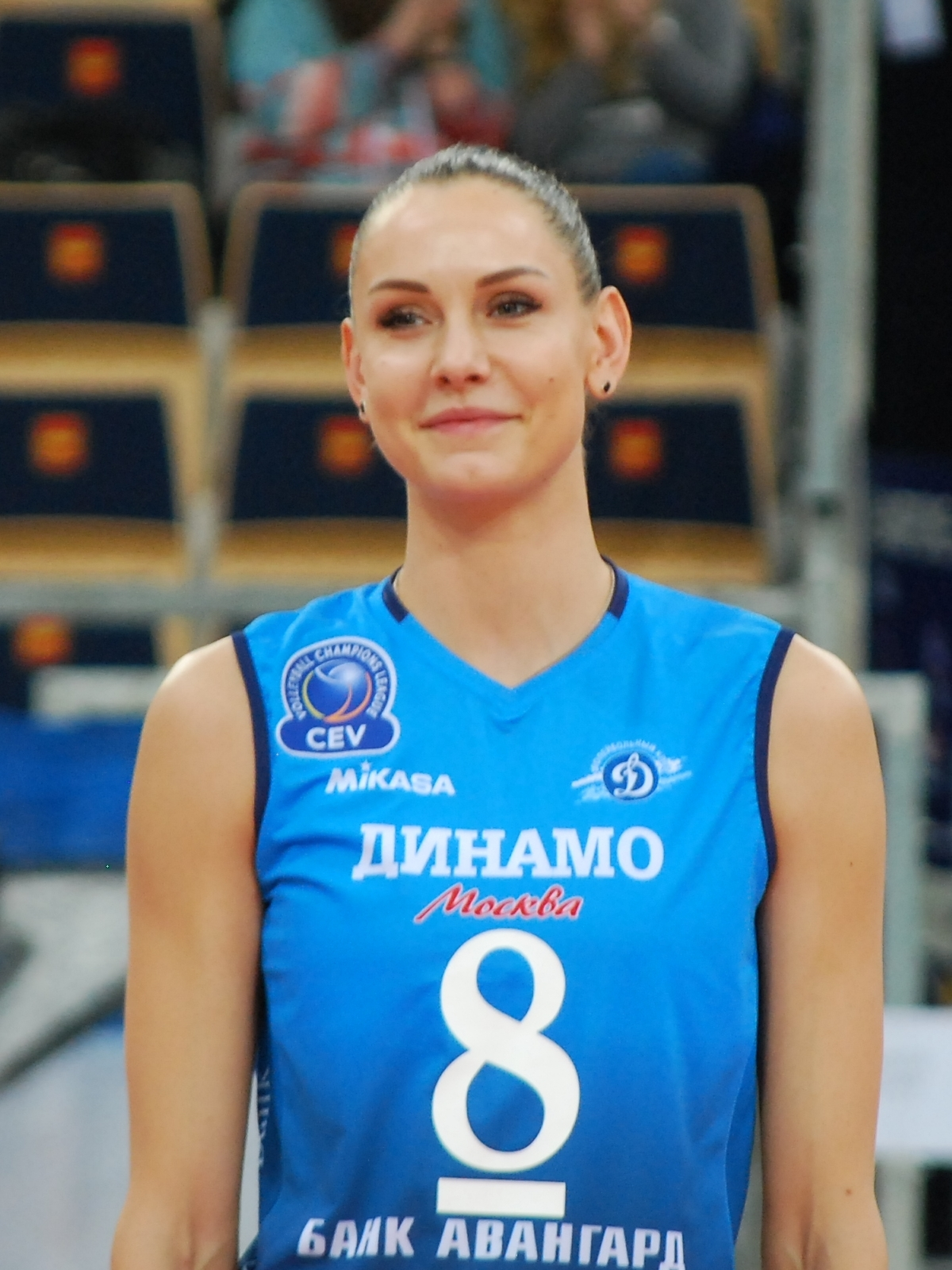
- Nataliya Goncharova

Personal information
- Full name: Nataliya Olegovna Goncharova
- Nationality: Ukrainian/Russian
- Born: 1 June 1989 (age 37); Skole, Ukrainian SSR, Soviet Union
- Height: 1.96 m (6 ft 5 in)
- Weight: 75 kg (165 lb)
- Spike: 320 cm (126 in)
- Block: 305 cm (120 in)

Volleyball information
- Position: Opposite
- Current club: Dynamo Moscow
- Number: 8

Career
Years	Teams
2007–	University Ivano-Frankivsk; Regina Rivne; Dynamo Moscow

National team
2007–2009; 2010–	Ukraine; Russia
Honours
Women's volleyball
Representing Russia
World Championship
Gold medal – first place	2010 Japan
World Cup
Bronze medal – third place	2019 Japan
World Grand Prix
Silver medal – second place	2015 USA
Bronze medal – third place	2014 Japan
European Championship
Gold medal – first place	2013 Germany
Gold medal – first place	2015 Netherlands/Belgium

Nataliya Olegovna Goncharova (Russian: Наталия Олеговна Гончарова, born 1 June 1989), from 2012 to 2016 Obmochaeva, is a Russian volleyball player. She played for the Ukraine women's national volleyball team until 2010 when she became part of the Russia women's national volleyball team.

== Career ==
She played with the Ukrainian team at the 2005 Girls' Youth European Volleyball Championship, the 2006 Women's Junior European Volleyball Championship, the 2007 Junior World Championship, the qualification for the Women's European Volleyball Championship (in 2007 and 2009), and the qualification for the 2008 Summer Olympics

With Russia, she was part of the teams which played the 2013 Summer Universiade in Kazan, the FIVB Volleyball World Grand Prix (in 2011, 2013, 2014, 2015, 2016), the European Championships (in 2011, 2013, 2015), the FIVB Volleyball Women's World Championship (in 2010, 2014, 2018), the 2015 FIVB Volleyball Women's World Cup in Japan, and the Olympic Games of London 2012, Rio 2016. and Tokyo 2020.

At club level, she played for University (in Ivano-Frankivsk) and Regina (in Rivne) before moving to Dynamo Moscow in 2007. Goncharova has been chosen the best player of the Russian Super League three times (in 2014–15, 2015–16 and 2016–17).

== Personal life ==
In 2012, she married Russian volleyball player Aleksey Obmochaev. However, they divorced in January 2016.

== Awards ==
=== Individuals ===
- 2013 Summer Universiade "Most valuable player"
- 2013 Summer Universiade "Best spiker"
- 2015 FIVB Grand Prix "Best opposite"
- 2015 FIVB World Cup "Best opposite"
- 2016 Women's European qualification "MVP"
- 2019 FIVB World Cup "Best scorer"
- 2020 Russian Championship "Best scorer"
- 2014-15 Russian Championship "Best player"
- 2015-16 Russian Championship "Best player"
- 2016-17 Russian Championship "Best player"
- 2017-18 Russian Championship "Best player"
- 2018-19 Russian Championship "Best player"

=== National team ===
==== Junior ====
- 2005 Girls' Youth European Volleyball Championship – Gold medal (with Ukraine)
- 2006 Women's Junior European Volleyball Championship – Bronze medal (with Ukraine)
- 2013 Universiade – Gold medal (with Russia)

==== Senior ====
- 2010 FIVB World Championship – Gold medal (with Russia)
- 2013 European Championship – Gold medal (with Russia)
- 2014 FIVB World Grand Prix – Bronze medal (with Russia)
- 2015 FIVB World Grand Prix – Silver medal (with Russia)
- 2015 European Championship – Gold medal (with Russia)
- 2019 World Cup - Bronze medal (with Russia)

=== Clubs ===
- 2007 Russian Cup – Runner-Up (with Dinamo Moscow)
- 2007–08 Russian Championship – Runner-Up (with Dinamo Moscow)
- 2008 Russian Cup – Runner-Up (with Dinamo Moscow)
- 2008–09 Russian Championship – Champion (with Dinamo Moscow)
- 2008–09 CEV Women's Champions League – Runner-Up (with Dinamo Moscow)
- 2009 Russian Cup – Champion (with Dinamo Moscow)
- 2009–10 Russian Championship – Runner-Up (with Dinamo Moscow)
- 2010–11 Russian Championship – Runner-Up (with Dinamo Moscow)
- 2011 Russian Cup – Champion (with Dinamo Moscow)
- 2011–12 Russian Championship – Runner-Up (with Dinamo Moscow)
- 2012 Russian Cup – Runner-Up (with Dinamo Moscow)
- 2012–13 Russian Championship – Runner-Up (with Dinamo Moscow)
- 2013 Russian Cup – Champion (with Dinamo Moscow)
- 2013–14 Russian Championship – Runner-Up (with Dinamo Moscow)
- 2014–15 Russian Championship – Runner-Up (with Dinamo Moscow)
- 2015–16 Russian Championship – Champion (with Dinamo Moscow)
- 2016 Russian Cup – Runner-Up (with Dinamo Moscow)
- 2016–17 Russian Championship – Champion(with Dinamo Moscow)

Awards
Preceded by (Brazil) Sheilla Castro	Best Opposite Spiker of FIVB World Grand Prix; 2015	Succeeded by (Netherlands) Lonneke Slöetjes
Preceded by First Award	Best Opposite of World Cup; 2015	Succeeded by (United States) Andrea Drews
