= Andrei Voronkov (volleyball) =

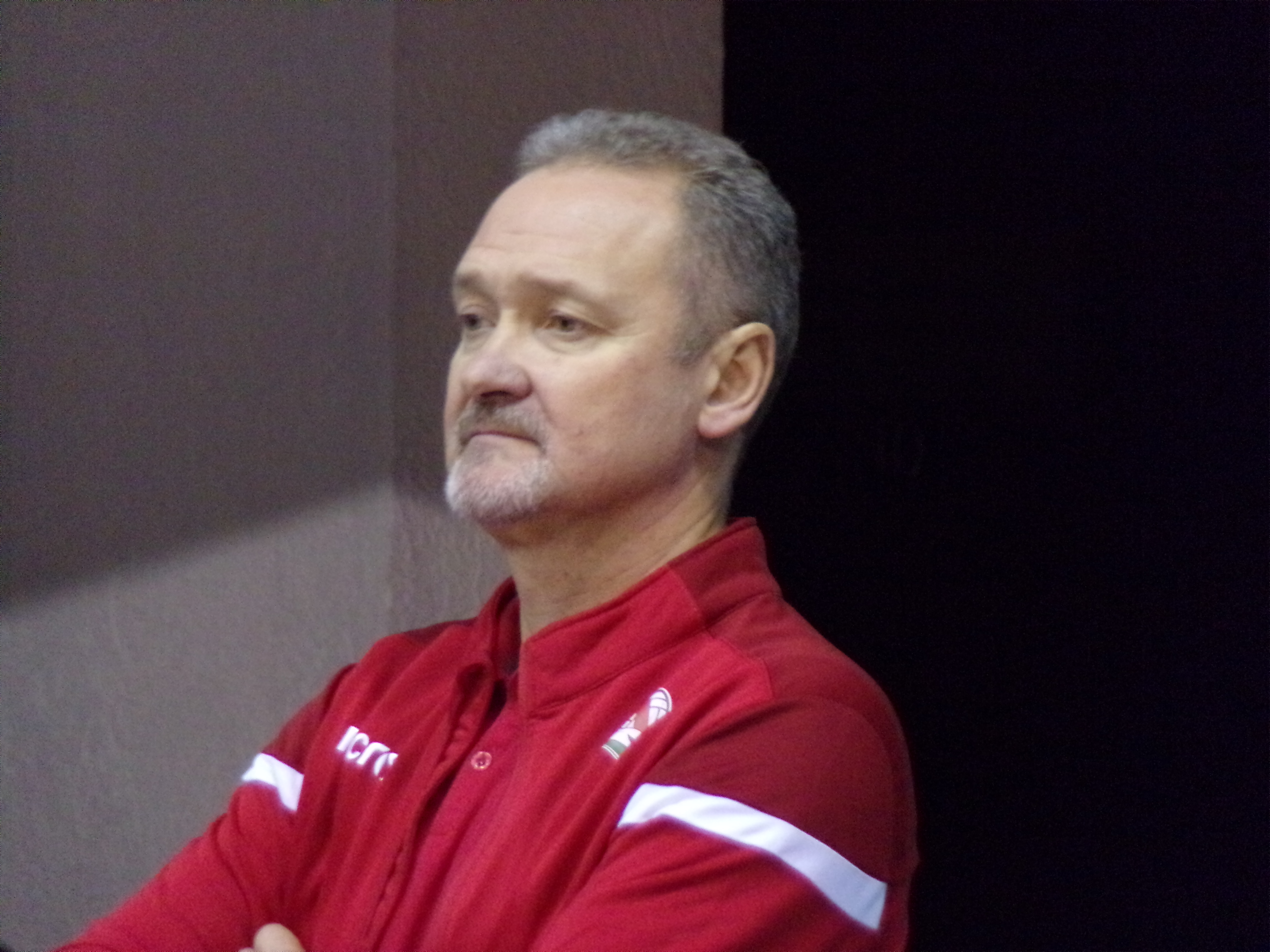

Personal information
- Born: 19 May 1967 (age 59) Slavsk, Russia

Sport
- Club: VC CSKA Moscow (1986–88); SKA Rostov (1988–92); Samotlor (1992–95); Netas (1995–04); Samotlor (2004–06); VC Dinamo Krasnodar (2016–present)

Andrei Genadyevich Voronkov (Russian: Андрей Геннадьевич Воронков; born 19 May 1967) is a Russian volleyball coach and former player. As a player, he won the Turkish championships in 1996–1998, 2002 and 2004. Since 2006 he works as a volleyball coach. Between 2013 and 2015 he was head coach of the Russian men's team.

Voronkov is married to a volleyball coach and former player. Their both daughters are also volleyball players. One of them, Irina Voronkova, is a member of the national team.
