= Dynamo Moscow =

Russian sports club

MGO VFSO "Dynamo"
- Full name: Moscow City Organization of the All-Russian Physical Culture and Sports Society "Dynamo" (MGO VFSO "Dynamo"); Russian: Московская городская организация Всероссийского физкультурно-спортивного oбщества «Динамо» (МГО ВФСО «Динамо»)
- Founded: 18 April 1923, Moscow
- Based in: Moscow, Russia
- Colors: Blue, White
- President: Vladimir Strzhalkovskiy
- Website: www.dynamo.su

MGO VFSO "Dynamo" (Russian: МГО ВФСО «Динамо»), commonly known as Dynamo Moscow (Russian: Динамо Москва), is a Russian sports club based in Moscow. Founded by Felix Dzerzhinsky on 18 April 1923, Dynamo Moscow was the first institution created from the All-Union Dynamo Sports Club.

Dynamo Moscow developed numerous athletes. Among them, multiple Olympic medalists like fencer Galina Gorokhova and gymnast Mikhail Voronin, Ballon d'Or winner the "Black Spider" Lev Yashin, three-time ice hockey Olympic gold medalist Vitaly Davydov, and one of the most decorated in rhythmic gymnastic, Alina Kabaeva.

Since December 2019, the Dynamo Society is headed by the FSB two-star general Anatoly Gulevsky.

== Departments ==
Sport	Teams
Football	FC Dynamo Moscow formed in 1923.
Women Football	ZFK Dynamo Moscow formed in 2021.
Ice hockey	HC Dynamo Moscow formed in 1946.
Basketball	BC Dynamo Moscow formed in 1923, dissolved in 2016.
Basketball	WBC Dynamo Moscow formed in 1923.
Volleyball	VC Dynamo Moscow formed in 1926.
Volleyball	WVC Dynamo Moscow formed in 1926.
Water Polo	WPC Dynamo Moscow formed in 1923.
Futsal	MFK Dinamo Moskva formed in 2002.
Beach soccer	PFK Dynamo Moscow formed in 2012.
Rugby	RC Dynamo Moscow formed in 1933.
Bandy	Dynamo Moscow Bandy Club formed in 1923.
Swimming	Dynamo Moscow (swimming) formed in 2010.
Fencing	Dynamo Moscow (fencing) formed in 1923.
Rowing	Dynamo Moscow (rowing) formed in 1928.
Modern pentathlon	Dynamo Moscow (Modern pentathlon)
Gymnastics	Dynamo Moscow (gymnastics) formed in 1974.
Martial arts	Dynamo Moscow (martial arts)
Shooting	Dynamo Moscow (shooting sport) formed in 1923.
Cycling	Dynamo Moscow (cycling)

== Notable athletes gallery ==
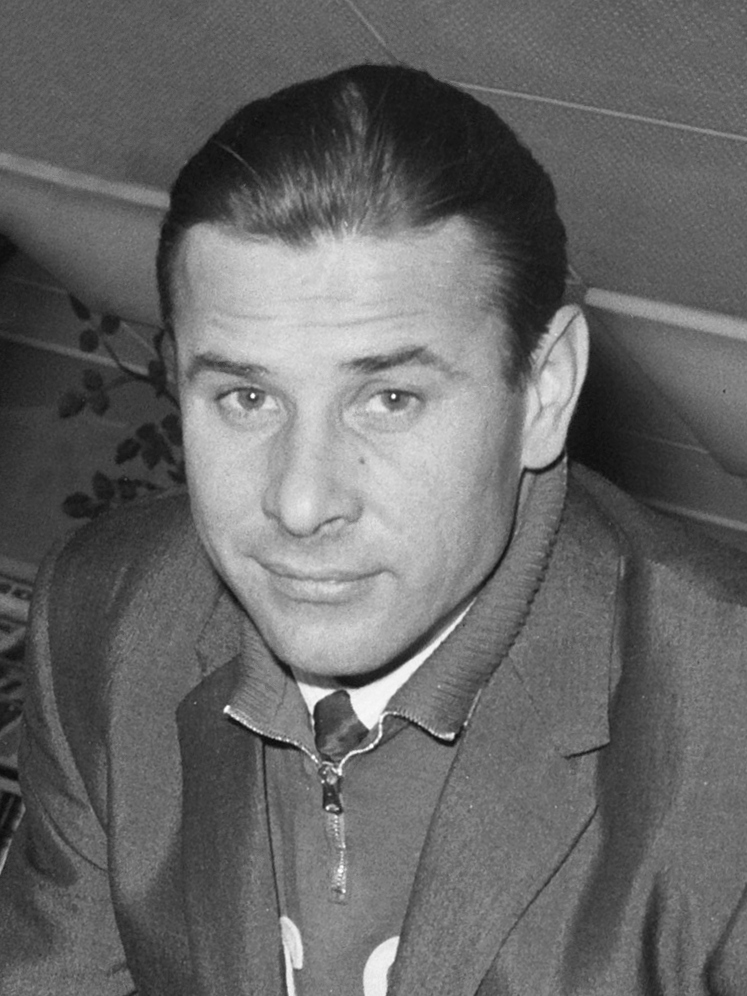
Lev Yashin

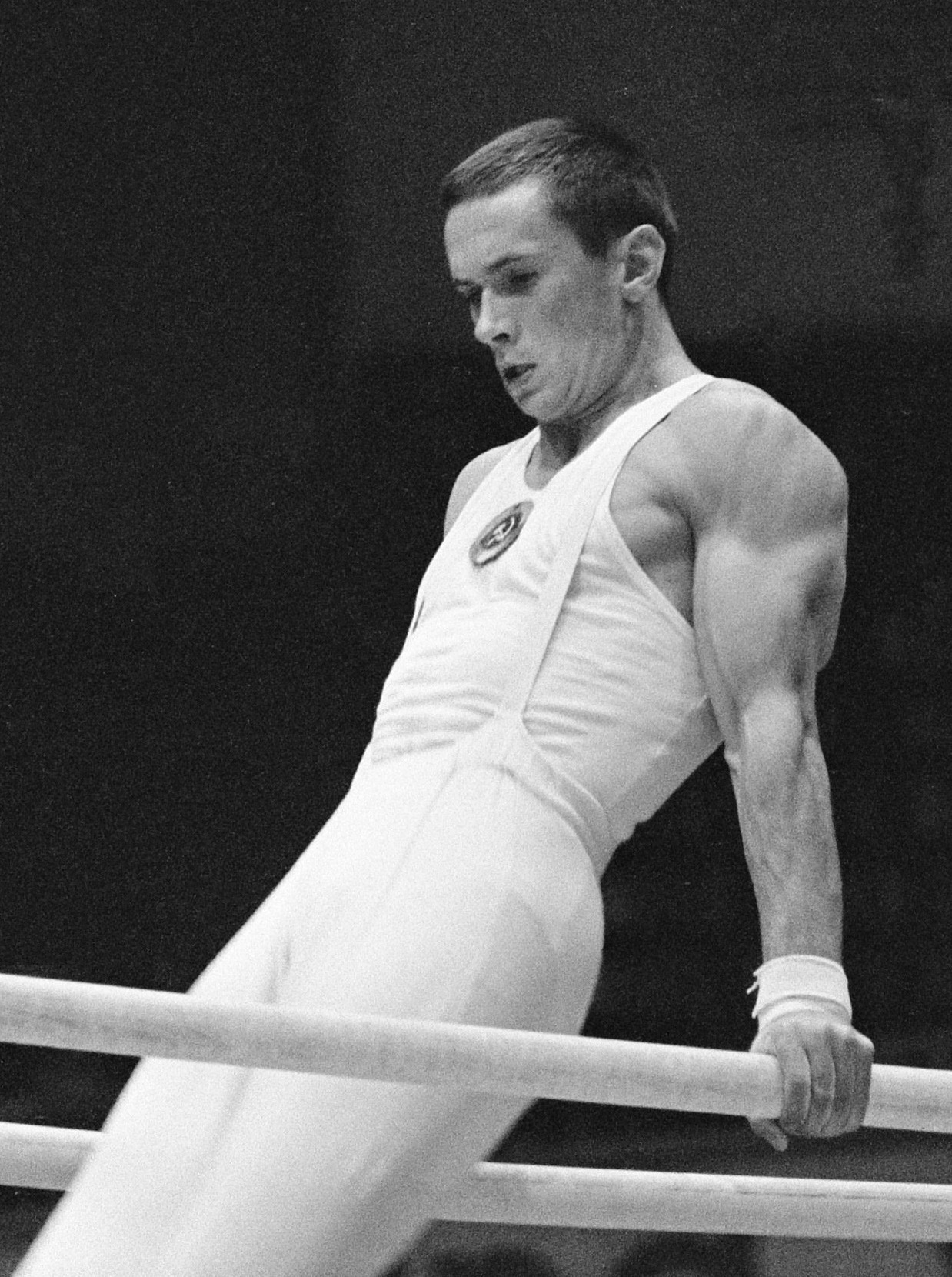
Mikhail Voronin

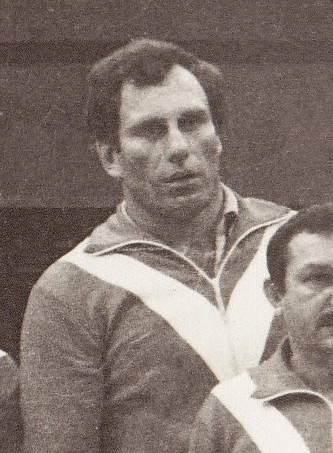
Nikolay Balboshin

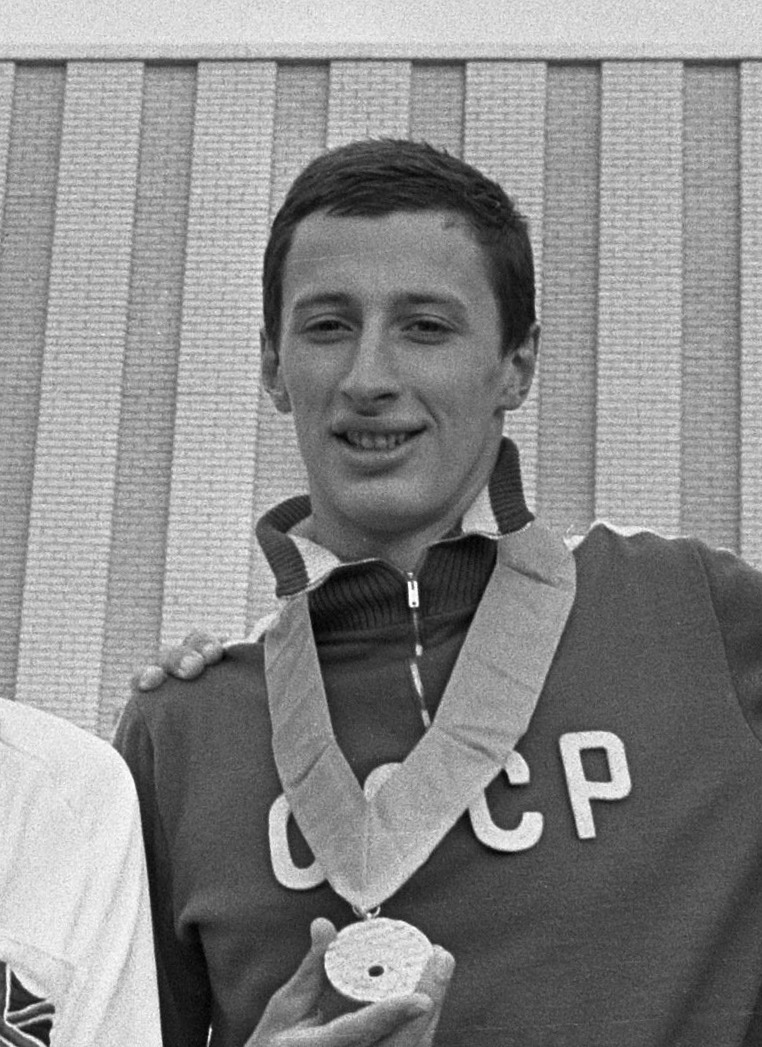
Semyon Belits-Geiman

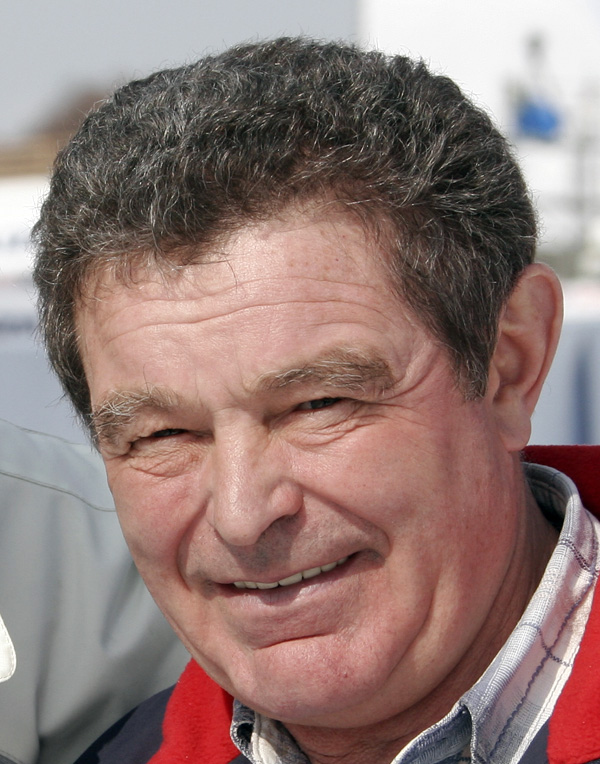
Vyacheslav Vedenin

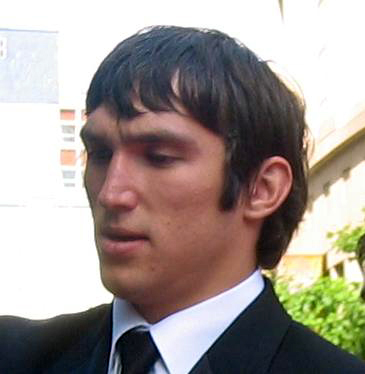
Alexander Ovechkin

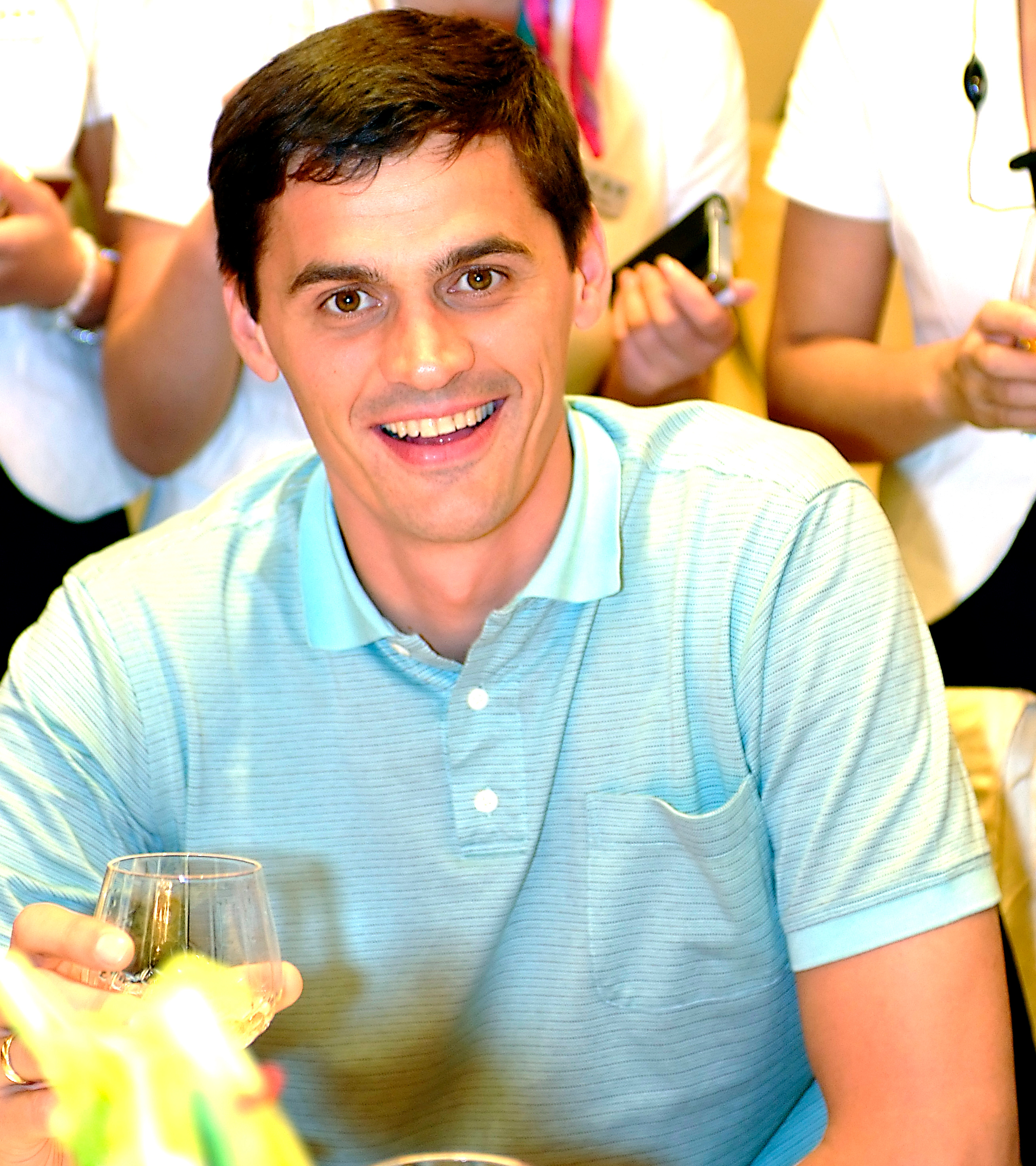
Alexander Popov

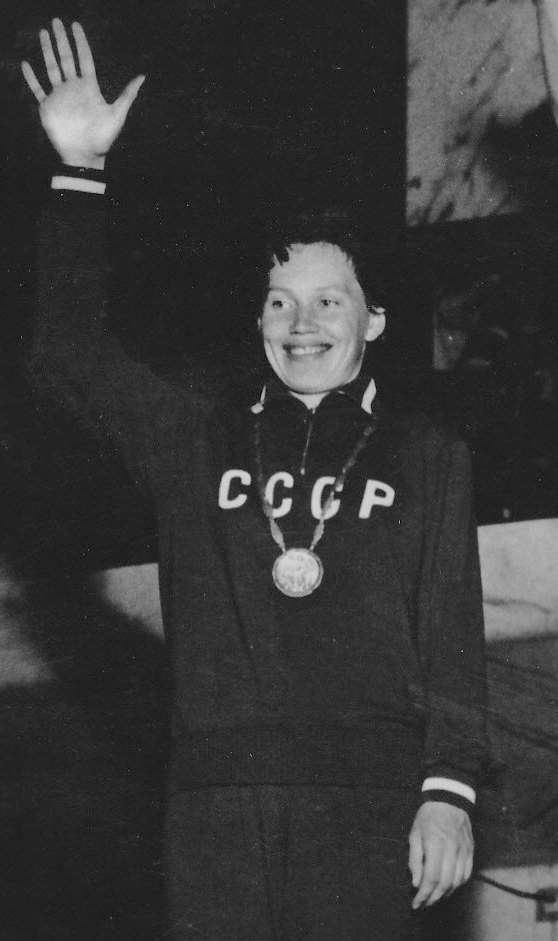
Valentina Rastvorova

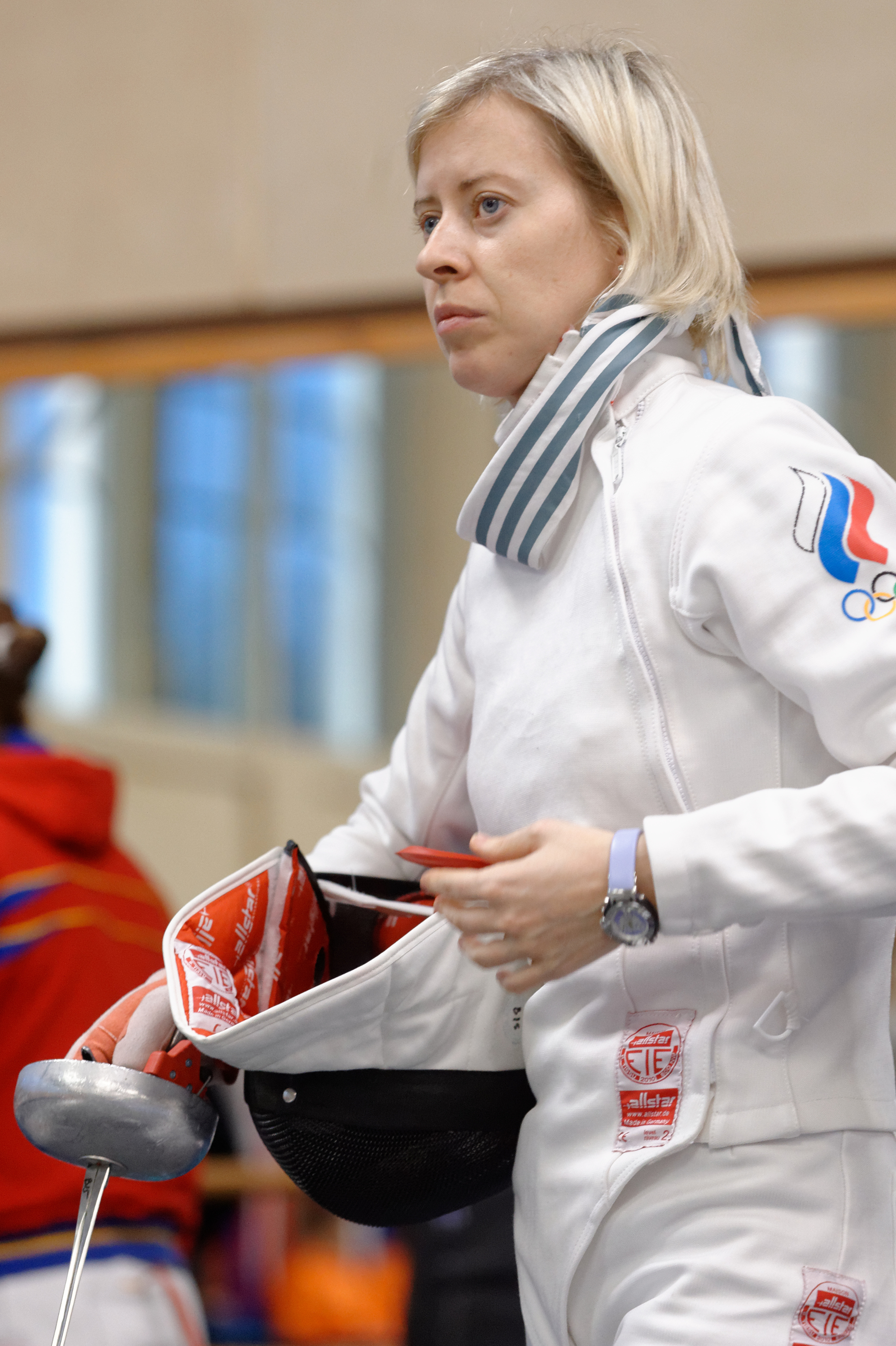
Tatiana Logunova

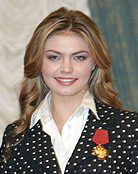
Alina Kabaeva

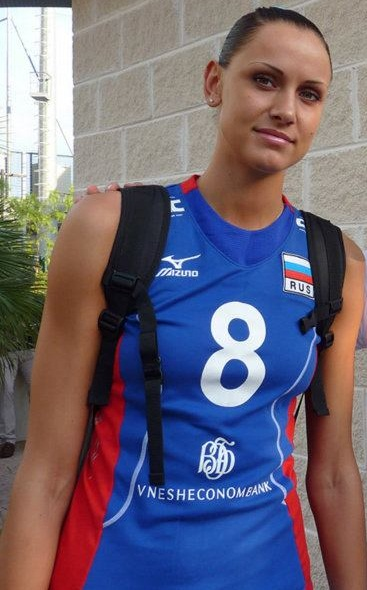
Nataliya Goncharova
