= Maria Perepelkina =

Russian volleyball player (born 1984)

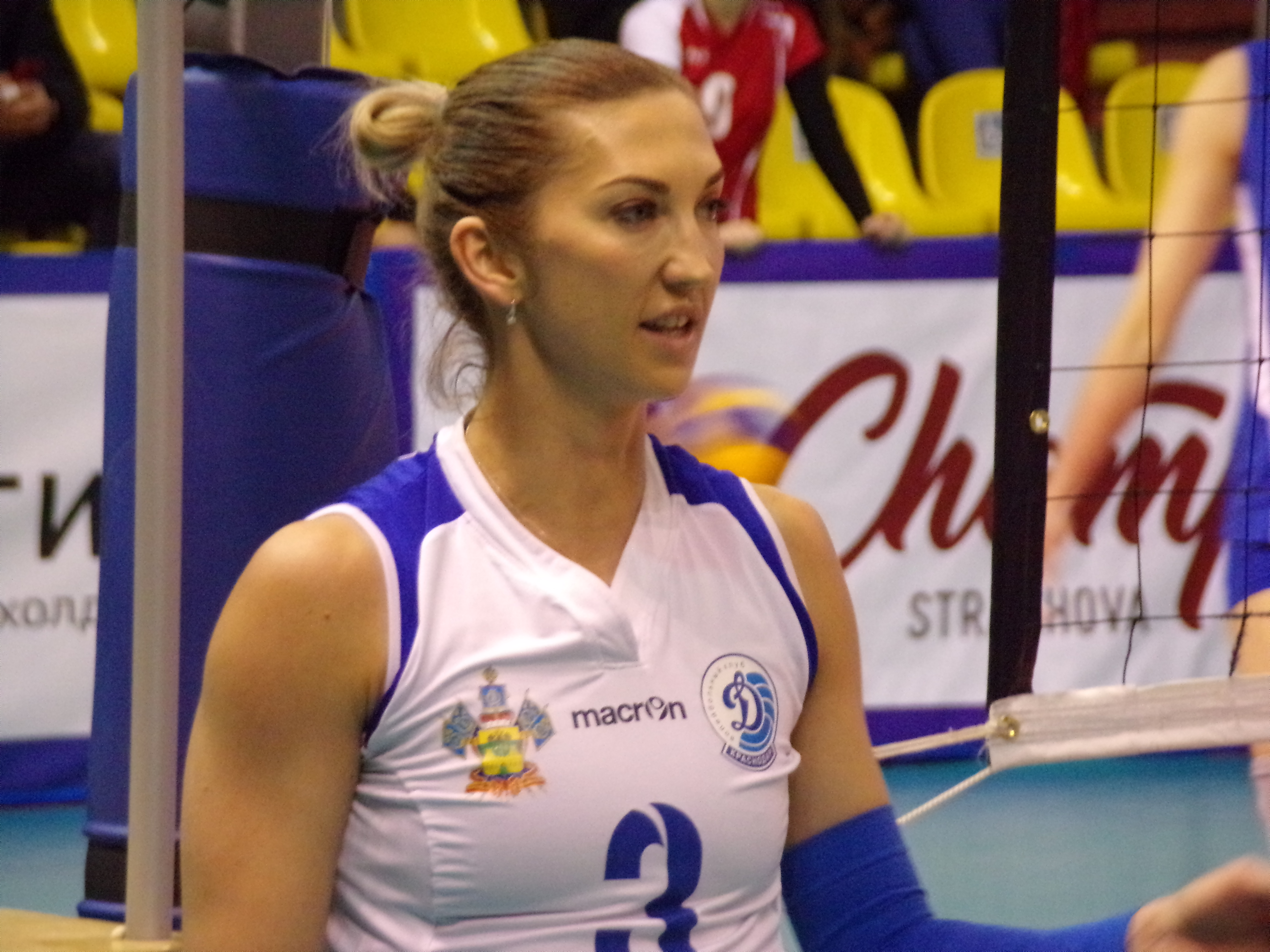

Personal information
- Full name: Maria Nikolaevna Perepelkina
- Nationality: Russia
- Born: 9 March 1984 (age 42); Almaty, Kazakhstan
- Height: 1.87 m (6 ft 1 1/2 in)
- Weight: 72 kg (159 lb)

Volleyball information
- Current club: Dinamo Krasnodar

National team
2009-2012	Russia
Honours
Women's volleyball
Representing Russia
World Championship
Gold medal – first place	2010 Japan	Team

Maria Nikolaevna Perepelkina (Russian: Мария Николаевна Перепелкина; born 9 March 1984) is a Russian volleyball player. She was a member of the national team that won the gold medal at the 2010 World Championship.
