= VC Zarechye Odintsovo =

Russian volleyball club

Zarechye-Odintsovo
- Full name: Volleyball Club Zarechye-Odintsovo
- Founded: 1987
- Ground: Volleyball-Sports Complex (Capacity: 2,200)
- Chairman: Sergey Tairov
- Manager: Vadim Pankov
- League: Women's Super League
- 2021–22: 14th
- Website: Club home page

Uniforms
Home	Away

Zarechye-Odintsovo (Russian: Заречье-Одинцово) is a Russian women's volleyball club based in Odintsovo. The club was founded in 1987 and plays in the super league, the top Russian league.

== History ==
The club was established in 1987. The first title came in 1995, with the Russian Cup. Five more cups were added with victories in 2002, 2003, 2004, 2006 and 2007. The first Russian Super League title came in 2007–08 and the second in 2009–10. In European competitions, the club was runner-up of the CEV Champions League in the 2007–08 edition, losing the final against Despar Colussi Perugia. The team won its first European competition in 2013–14 at the CEV Challenge Cup, beating Beşiktaş in the final.

== Honours ==
=== National competitions ===
- Russian Super League: 2

2007–08, 2009–10

- Russian Cup: 6

1995, 2002, 2003, 2004, 2006, 2007

=== International competitions ===
- CEV Challenge Cup: 1

2013–14

== Team roster ==
Season 2018–2019

Number	Player	Position	Height (m)	Weight (kg)	Birth date
1	(Russia) Olga Efimova	Setter	1.81	68	6 January 1990 (age 36)
2	(Russia) Valeriya Goncharova	Middle blocker	1.88	70	3 January 1988 (age 38)
4	(Russia) Evgeniya Bayandina	Libero	1.74	0	
6	(Russia) Kristina Kurnosova	Libero	1.73	62	17 June 1997 (age 29)
7	(Russia) Ksenia Smirnova	Opposite	1.90	76	24 April 1998 (age 28)
8	(Russia) Anna Melnikova	Middle blocker	1.92	87	13 October 1995 (age 30)
9	(Russia) Victoria Russu	Opposite	1.94	70	16 February 1999 (age 27)
10	(Russia) Olga Biryukova	Outside hitter	1.93	74	19 September 1994 (age 31)
13	(Russia) Elizaveta Kotova	Middle blocker	1.87	81	31 May 1998 (age 28)
15	(Russia) Natalia Nepomnyashchikh	Setter	1.84	68	6 August 1987 (age 39)
16	(Russia) Maria Vorobyeva	Outside hitter	1.85	77	24 February 1998 (age 28)
19	(Russia) Tatiana Iurinskaia	Outside hitter	1.85	72	25 February 1996 (age 30)

== Notable players ==
- (Russia) Tatiana Kosheleva
- (Russia) Svetlana Kryuchkova
- (Russia) Yulia Merkulova
- (Russia) Lyubov Sokolova
- (Serbia) Mina Popović
- (Brazil) Paula Pequeno
- (Brazil) Walewska Oliveira
- (Germany) Margareta Kozuch
- (Italy) Antonella Del Core
- (Ukraine) Iryna Zhukova
