= VC Uralochka-NTMK =

Russian volleyball club

Uralochka-NTMK
- Full name: Volleyball Club Uralochka-NTMK
- Founded: 1966
- Ground: Metallurg-Forum, Nizhny Tagil, Russia (Capacity: 3,200)
- Chairman: Aleksey Kushnarev
- Manager: Mikhail Karpol
- League: Women's Super League
- 2021–22: 2nd
- Website: Club home page

Uniforms
Home	Away

Uralochka-NTMK (Russian: «Уралочка-НТМК») is a Russian professional women's volleyball club based in Yekaterinburg and currently plays in the Super League, the top Russian league. It was established in 1966 and is the most successful club in the USSR and Russian women's volleyball combined history with 25 national championship titles (11 Soviet and 14 Russian).

== Previous names ==
- Uralochka Sverdlovsk (1966–1991)
- Uralochka Yekaterinburg (1991–2001)
- Uralochka-NTMK (2001–present)

== History ==
=== Soviet years ===
In 1966 the Transport Engineering Sverdlov plant (now Uraltransmash) decided to create a women's volleyball team to represent Sverdlovsk Oblast. It was named Uralochka (an endearment form for Ural woman) and in December that same year it was allowed to compete at the national championship, Alexander Kilchevsky became the club's first coach.

During its first years, the results were inconsistent with the team being relegated and promoted and in 1969, Nikolay Karpol was appointed head coach and it was only by the end of the 1973 season when the club gained promotion to the highest USSR championship that results begin to become consistent. During the early and mid-1970s Dinamo Moscow was the dominant force in Soviet women's volley but Uralochka become very competitive and begin to challenge Dinamo's dominance. By the late 1970s the club won its first national title (in 1978) and went on to win the national titles for another four consecutive seasons (1979, 1980, 1981, 1982). European success came next, the club started to assert itself as a European force by winning the CEV Champions League for three consecutive years (1980–81, 1981–82, 1982–83) and the Cup Winners Cup of 1985–86. A first national Cup title came in 1986, during the same season another national championship was won, with another five consecutive ones arriving in the following seasons (1987, 1988, 1989, 1990 and 1991). Two more cups (in 1987 and 1989) and three CEV Champions league (in 1986–87, 1988–89 and 1989–90) were added and by the time of the dissolution of the Soviet Union, the club had established itself as one of the strongest teams in the continent.

=== Russian years ===
When Sverdlovsk became Yekaterinburg, the club name changed from Uralochka Sverdlovsk to Uralochka Yekaterinburg. The club would dominate the newly created Russian Women's League winning the tournaments first 14 seasons (from 1991–92 to 2004–05), which when added to the titles of the last 6 seasons of the USSR makes the club the national championship winner for 20 consecutive years. In the European competitions, the club has reached the semifinal or later stages of the CEV Champions league in six consecutive seasons (from 1991–92 to 1996–97) winning the title in two occasions (1993–94 and 1994–95).

In 2001 the club was renamed Uralochka-NTMK, with NTMK standing for Nizhniy Tagil Iron and Steel Works (literally "Nizhny Tagil Metallurgic Kombinat").

== Venues ==
The club has two venues in which to play.

- Metallurg-Forum, in Nizhny Tagil, 3,200 spectators capacity.
- Palace of Sporting Games "Uralochka" (DIVS), in Yekaterinburg, 5,000 spectators capacity.

== Honours ==
=== National competitions ===
USSR

- USSR Championship : 11

1978, 1979, 1980, 1981, 1982, 1986, 1987, 1988, 1989, 1990, 1991

- USSR Cup: 3

1986, 1987, 1989

Russia

- Russian Super League: 14

1991–92, 1992–93, 1993–94, 1994–95, 1995–96, 1996–97, 1997–98, 1998–99, 1999–00, 2000–01, 2001–02, 2002–03, 2003–04, 2004–05

=== International competitions ===
- CEV Champions League: 8

1980–81, 1981–82, 1982–83, 1986–87, 1988–89, 1989–90, 1993–94, 1994–95

- Cup Winners Cup: 1

1985–86

== Team roster ==
Season 2020–2021, as of November 2020.

Number	Player	Position	Height (m)	Weight (kg)	Birth date
1	(Russia) Valeria Safonova	Middle blocker	1.83	72	28 March 1992 (age 33)
4	(Russia) Daria Pilipenko	Libero	1.77	69	9 June 1990 (age 35)
5	(Ukraine) Bogdana Azinova	Outside hitter	1.90	78	16 March 1992 (age 33)
6	(Russia) Kristina Kurnosova	Libero	1.73	67	17 June 1997 (age 28)
7	(Russia) Valeria Karlova	Outside hitter	1.90	74	4 April 2000 (age 25)
8	(Russia) Irina Sorikina	Setter	1.82	69	17 February 1995 (age 30)
9	(Russia) Alena Kondrashova	Setter	1.80	65	7 April 1997 (age 28)
10	(Russia) Elizaveta Kotova	Middle blocker	1.86	81	31 May 1998 (age 27)
12	(Cuba) Ailama Cese	Outside hitter	1.88	58	29 October 2000 (age 25)
13	(Russia) Ksenia Parubets	Outside hitter	1.84	64	31 October 1994 (age 31)
14	(Russia) Tatiana Kulikova	Middle blocker	1.90	75	21 November 1993 (age 31)
15	(Russia) Polina Trukhina	Libero	1.76	67	27 May 1998 (age 27)
18	(Belarus) Vera Kostyuchik	Opposite	1.91	71	27 September 2000 (age 25)
19	(Russia) Valentina Bichinina	Outside hitter	1.85	70	2 November 2000 (age 24)
21	(Russia) Elizaveta Fitisova	Middle blocker	1.87	68	21 September 2001 (age 24)
23	(Russia) Tatiana Seliutina	Setter	1.83	70	10 August 2000 (age 25)
30	(Russia) Ksenia Smirnova	Opposite	1.88	76	24 April 1998 (age 27)

== Notable players ==
- (Soviet Union) Irina Kirillova
- (Russia) Yevgeniya Artamonova
- (Russia) Marina Babeshina
- (Russia) Yekaterina Gamova
- (Russia) Yelena Godina
- (Russia) Irina Ilchenko
- (Russia) Valentina Ogiyenko
- (Russia) Marina Pankova
- (Russia) Maria Perepelkina
- (Russia) Lyubov Sokolova
- (Russia) Irina Tebenikhina
- (Russia) Elizaveta Tishchenko
- (Russia) Yelena Tyurina
- (Russia) Yelena Vasilevskaya
- (Russia) Irina Zaryazhko
- (Belarus) Aksana Kavalchuk
- (Bulgaria) Strashimira Filipova
- (Croatia) Mia Jerkov
- (Cuba) Rosir Calderón
- (Cuba) Nancy Carrillo
- (Cuba) Yaima Ortíz
- (Cuba) Yumilka Ruiz
- (Trinidad and Tobago) Sinead Jack
- (Russia) Anastasiya Kodirova

== Uralochka 2 ==
In 1983 the club created another team, which on its own right became competitive, winning the USSR Cup in 1988, finishing second once in the USSR Championship and finishing the Russian Championship five times in second and five times in third places. In 2003, Uralochka 2 effectively became the second team to support youth players and provide players to the main team.

Over the years it has played under various names (Yunezis, Uraltransbank, Aeroflot-Malachite, Aeroflot-Uraltransbank, Uralochka 2 - Ural State Technical University, Uralochka 2 - USUE).
