= WVC Dynamo Kazan =

Russian women's volleyball club

Dinamo Kazan
- Full name: Women's Volleyball Club Dinamo-Kazan
- Founded: 2002
- Ground: Kazan Volleyball Centre, Kazan (Capacity: 5,000)
- Chairman: Leonid Barychev
- Manager: Zoran Terzic
- League: Women's Super League
- 2025–26: 1st
- Website: Club home page

Uniforms
Home	Away

Dinamo Kazan (Russian: Динамо-Казань) is a Russian professional women's volleyball club based in Kazan. The club was founded in 2002 and plays in the super league, the top Russian league.

== Previous names ==
- Kazanochka (2002–2008)
- Dinamo Kazan (2008–2019)
- Dinamo-Ak Bars (2020–

== History ==
The club was founded in September 2002 as Kazanochka and made quick progress in the lower leagues, arriving at the Super league in the 2005–06 season. On its second season at the Super league, the club reached the top four and earned a spot at the 2007–08 CEV Women's Challenge Cup.

The 2007–08 season was difficult for the club, who lost its main sponsor just before the start of the season. Faced with an uncertain future, the club just managed to fulfil its season competitions commitments with poor results, being relegated from the Super league and failing to qualify in the top 8 of the CEV Challenge Cup. With the club at the point of being dissolved, the Ministry of Internal Affairs of the Republic of Tatarstan directly intervened and took over the club. As a result, the club's name was changed to Dinamo Kazan.

Dinamo Kazan returned to the Super league in 2009–10 and signed players which improved the quality of the team, among them Jordan Larson, Ekaterina Gamova, Maria Borisenko, Tatiana Kosheleva, Ekaterina Kabeshova and Vera Ulyakina. These players (apart from Jordan Larson, who is American) formed the core of the Russian national team in 2010. Success and results came soon in the following seasons, the club won the 2010 Russian Cup, its first title, and would go on to win the Super league for five consecutive seasons (from 2010–11 until 2014–15). It won a second Russian Cup in 2012 and the 2013–14 CEV Champions League held in Baku, Azerbaijan, defeating the home team Rabita Baku in the semifinals by 3–0 and the Turkish side VakıfBank İstanbul also by 3–0 in the final. The title qualified the club for the 2014 FIVB Club World Championship played in Switzerland, where the club would beat Brazilian sides SESI-SP by 3–1 in the semifinals and Molico Osasco by 3–0 in the final to claim the title.

In December 2016, the club won its third Russian Cup after beating Dinamo Moscow by 3–1 in the final. Kazan won its third straight title in 2017, beating VC Yenisey Krasnoyarsk 3–0 in the decisive game.

== Honours ==
=== National competitions ===
- Russian Super League: 8

2010–11, 2011–12, 2012–13, 2013–14, 2014–15, 2019–20, 2023–24, 2025–26

- Russian Cup: 8

2010, 2012, 2016, 2017, 2019, 2020, 2021, 2024

- Russian Super Cup: 4

2020, 2022, 2024, 2025

=== International competitions ===
- FIVB Volleyball Women's Club World Championship: 1

2014

- CEV Champions League: 1

2013–14

- CEV Cup: 1

2016–17

== Team roster ==
Season 2026–2027

Number	Player	Position	Height (m)	Weight (kg)	Birth date
3	(Russia) Milina Rakhmatullina	Libero	1.73	67	3 October 2001 (age 25)
4	(Russia) Polina Matveeva	Setter	1.94	74	8 August 2002 (age 24)
5	(Belarus) Tatsiana Trafimava	Outside hitter	1.85	76	24 September 1992 (age 34)
6	(Russia) Valeriya Zaytseva	Middle blocker	1.88	71	24 March 1995 (age 31)
7	(Belarus) Anastasija Svetnik	Middle blocker	1.93		12 April 2002 (age 24)
8	(Russia) Maria Bibina	Libero	1.76	65	26 March 1994 (age 32)
10	(Russia) Anastasia Anufrienko	Setter	1.84		18 February 1993 (age 33)
13	(Russia) Anastasiya Kudryashova	Opposite	1.93		15 December 1999 (age 26)
14	(Russia) Ekaterina Gatina	Outside hitter	1.93	66	24 November 2004 (age 21)
17	(Belarus) Hanna Davyskiba	Outside hitter	1.88	72	8 February 2000 (age 26)
18	(Russia) Kamilla Rebrova	Outside hitter	1.87		24 February 2007 (age 19)
19	(Russia) Daria Malygina	Middle blocker	2.02	82	4 April 1994 (age 32)
21	(Dominican Republic) Brayelin Martínez	Outside hitter	2.02	83	11 September 1996 (age 30)
22	(Russia) Taisiya Konovalova	Middle blocker	1.88	69	22 May 1996 (age 30)
23	(Dominican Republic) Gaila González	Opposite	1.90	73	22 June 1997 (age 29)

== Notable players ==
- (Russia) Marina Babeshina
- (Russia) Maria Borodakova
- (Russia) Lesya Evdokimova
- (Russia) Ekaterina Gamova
- (Russia) Olga Khrzhanovskaya
- (Russia) Tatiana Kosheleva
- (Russia) Lesya Makhno
- (Russia) Yevgeniya Startseva
- (Russia) Ekaterina Ulanova
- (Russia) Vera Ulyakina
- (Russia) Irina Zaryazhko
- (Russia) Anna Malova
- (Russia) Arina Fedorovtseva
- (Russia) Irina Voronkova
- (Russia) Tatiana Kadochkina
- (Russia) Vita Akimova
- (Bulgaria) Elitsa Vasileva
- (Azerbaijan) Natalya Mammadova
- (Italy) Antonella Del Core
- (Italy) Elena Pietrini
- (Japan) Megumi Kurihara
- (Thailand) Onuma Sittirak
- (United States) Heather Bown
- (United States) Tayyiba Haneef-Park
- (United States) Jordan Larson
- (Dominican Republic) Bethania de la Cruz
- (Dominican Republic) Brayelin Martinez
- (Croatia) Samanta Fabris
- (Mexico) Samantha Bricio
