= VC Dinamo Krasnodar (women's volleyball team) =

Russian volleyball club

Dinamo Krasnodar
- Full name: Volleyball Club Dinamo Krasnodar
- Founded: 1946
- Ground: Palais des Sports Olympus, Krasnodar, Russia (Capacity: 3,000)
- Chairman: Sergey Kucheruk
- Manager: Pavel Zabuslaev
- Captain: Yuliya Podskalnaya
- League: Women's Super League
- 2021–22: 8th
- Website: Club home page

Uniforms
Home	Away

Dinamo Krasnodar (Russian: Динамо Краснодар) is a Russian professional women's volleyball club based in Krasnodar. It was founded in 1946 and plays in the super league, the top Russian league.

== History ==
=== Soviet years ===
Founded in 1946, the club participated in the 1946 Soviet Women's Volleyball Championship (National championship) finishing in 11th place (out of 18 teams). From that point, the club competed only at regional level until 1955 when it returned to the National championship remaining there until 1966 when it was relegated to a lower national level. In the years that followed, the club had mixed results being promoted and relegated many times without achieving any real tangible success.

=== Russian years ===
The club competed in the "B" league of the Russian Women's Championship in 1992–93 and gained promotion to the Super League. A year later it won its first title, the 1994 Russian Cup. It was relegated after a poor campaign in the 1997–98 Super League where it finished last. It took a decade for the club to return to the Super League, only returning in the 2009–10 season. Since then the club has become consistent and competitive, it qualified for a European competition for the first time, the Women's CEV Cup in 2010–11 reaching the final. On domestic level the club added two more Russian Cups (2014 and 2015). European success soon came in the form of titles in the 2012–13 CEV Challenge Cup and CEV Cups of 2014–15 and 2015–16. In 2015, the club was given a wildcard to participate of the FIVB Volleyball Club World Championship in Switzerland and reached the tournament's final.

== Honours ==
=== National competitions ===
- Russian Cup: 3

1994, 2014, 2015

=== International competitions ===
- CEV Cup: 2

2014–15, 2015–16

- CEV Challenge Cup: 1

2012–13

== Team roster ==
Season 2018–2019, as of January 2019.

Number	Player	Position	Height (m)	Weight (kg)	Birth date
1	(Russia) Bogumila Biarda	Opposite	1.91	90	24 May 1999 (age 26)
2	(Russia) Ekaterina Pipunyrova	Outside hitter	1.88	70	10 February 2000 (age 25)
3	(Russia) Maria Perepelkina	Middle blocker	1.87	72	9 March 1984 (age 41)
7	(Russia) Maria Khaletskaya	Opposite	1.95	78	31 July 1994 (age 30)
8	(Russia) Mariia Bibina	Libero	1.76	62	26 March 1995 (age 30)
10	(Russia) Anna Matienko	Setter	1.82	63	7 December 1981 (age 43)
11	(Russia) Victoria Rusakova	Outside hitter	1.88	80	23 October 1988 (age 36)
13	(Russia) Esenia Mishagina	Setter	1.78	61	1 December 2001 (age 23)
14	(Russia) Maria Bogovskaia	Outside hitter	1.87	73	20 June 2001 (age 24)
15	(Russia) Olga Zubareva	Middle blocker	1.90	78	11 August 1998 (age 26)
16	(Russia) Yuliya Grigoreva	Middle blocker	1.90	81	16 November 1986 (age 38)
17	(Russia) Angelina Sperskaite	Outside hitter	1.88	74	11 February 1997 (age 28)
18	(Russia) Ekaterina Tretyakova	Libero	1.76	60	19 October 1984 (age 40)
20	(Russia) Olga Zvereva	Outside hitter	1.85	75	5 March 2000 (age 25)

== Notable players ==
- (Soviet Union) Vera Duyunova
- (Soviet Union) Nataliya Kudreva
- (Soviet Union) Valentina Ogienko
- (Soviet Union) Lyudmila Shchetinina
- (Soviet Union) Zoya Yusova
- (Russia) Olga Fateeva
- (Russia) Tatiana Kosheleva
- (Russia) Svetlana Kryuchkova
- (Russia) Yulia Merkulova
- (Russia) Maria Perepelkina
- (Russia) Lyubov Sokolova
- (Russia) Yevgeniya Startseva
- (Russia) Elena Zarubina
- (Azerbaijan) Natalya Mammadova
- (Brazil) Fabíola de Souza
- (Brazil) Fe Garay
- (Cuba) Rosir Calderón
- (Czech Republic) Helena Havelková
- (Serbia) Anja Spasojević
- (Turkey) Neriman Özsoy
- (United States) Foluke Akinradewo
- (United States) Destinee Hooker
