= 2016 FIVB Volleyball Women's Club World Championship squads =

This article shows the rosters of all participating teams at the 2016 FIVB Volleyball Women's Club World Championship in Pasay, Philippines.

== Pool A ==
=== PSL-F2 Logistics Manila ===
The following is the roster of the Filipino league team selection PSL-F2 Logistics Manila in the 2016 FIVB Volleyball Women's Club World Championship.

Head coach: (Serbia) Moro Branislav

No.	Name	Date of birth	Height	Weight	Spike	Block
1	(Thailand) Tichaya Boonlert	14 January 1997	1.78 m (5 ft 10 in)	64 kg (141 lb)	291 cm (115 in)	283 cm (111 in)
3	(Philippines) Jaja Santiago	20 January 1996	1.95 m (6 ft 5 in)	68 kg (150 lb)	280 cm (110 in)	278 cm (109 in)
4	(United States) Stephanie Niemer	3 September 1989	1.86 m (6 ft 1 in)	70 kg (150 lb)	309 cm (122 in)	295 cm (116 in)
5	(Japan) Yuri Fukuda	26 June 1987	1.55 m (5 ft 1 in)	56 kg (123 lb)	255 cm (100 in)	250 cm (98 in)
6	(Philippines) Mika Reyes	21 June 1994	1.82 m (6 ft 0 in)	63 kg (139 lb)	279 cm (110 in)	267 cm (105 in)
7	(Philippines) Frances Molina	24 March 1994	1.80 m (5 ft 11 in)	61 kg (134 lb)	280 cm (110 in)	270 cm (110 in)
8	(Philippines) Jovelyn Gonzaga	30 October 1991	1.73 m (5 ft 8 in)	51 kg (112 lb)	273 cm (107 in)	274 cm (108 in)
9	(Philippines) Kim Fajardo	30 September 1993	1.70 m (5 ft 7 in)	60 kg (130 lb)	275 cm (108 in)	265 cm (104 in)
10	(Russia) Ekaterina Krivets	14 December 1984	1.93 m (6 ft 4 in)	74 kg (163 lb)	309 cm (122 in)	300 cm (120 in)
11	(Puerto Rico) Lynda Morales	20 May 1988	1.88 m (6 ft 2 in)	74 kg (163 lb)	302 cm (119 in)	296 cm (117 in)
12	(Philippines) Jennylyn Reyes	12 January 1991	1.55 m (5 ft 1 in)	51 kg (112 lb)	258 cm (102 in)	240 cm (94 in)
13	(Philippines) Rachel Daquis (C)	13 December 1987	1.78 m (5 ft 10 in)	60 kg (130 lb)	277 cm (109 in)	268 cm (106 in)
14	(Ukraine) Yevgeniya Nyukhalova	23 May 1995	1.93 m (6 ft 4 in)	79 kg (174 lb)	310 cm (120 in)	296 cm (117 in)
15	(United States) Lindsay Stalzer	15 July 1984	1.85 m (6 ft 1 in)	70 kg (150 lb)	280 cm (110 in)	277 cm (109 in)

=== Rexona-Sesc Rio ===
The following is the roster of the Brazilian club Rexona-Sesc Rio in the 2016 FIVB Volleyball Women's Club World Championship.

Head coach: (Brazil) Bernardo Rezende

No.	Name	Date of birth	Height	Weight	Spike	Block
1	(Brazil) Gabriela Guimarães	19 May 1994	1.76 m (5 ft 9 in)	59 kg (130 lb)	295 cm (116 in)	274 cm (108 in)
2	(Brazil) Mayhara Silva	9 April 1989	1.84 m (6 ft 0 in)	73 kg (161 lb)	320 cm (130 in)	270 cm (110 in)
5	(Brazil) Regiane Bidias (C)	2 October 1986	1.89 m (6 ft 2 in)	74 kg (163 lb)	304 cm (120 in)	286 cm (113 in)
6	(Brazil) Juciely Barreto	18 December 1980	1.84 m (6 ft 0 in)	71 kg (157 lb)	312 cm (123 in)	289 cm (114 in)
7	(Brazil) Camilla Adão	20 June 1984	1.74 m (5 ft 9 in)	64 kg (141 lb)	318 cm (125 in)	298 cm (117 in)
9	(Brazil) Vitória Lage	29 May 1995	1.65 m (5 ft 5 in)	60 kg (130 lb)	230 cm (91 in)	230 cm (91 in)
10	(Brazil) Monique Pavão	31 October 1986	1.78 m (5 ft 10 in)	67 kg (148 lb)	294 cm (116 in)	285 cm (112 in)
11	(Netherlands) Anne Buijs	2 December 1991	1.91 m (6 ft 3 in)	73 kg (161 lb)	317 cm (125 in)	299 cm (118 in)
12	(Brazil) Roberta Ratzke	28 April 1990	1.85 m (6 ft 1 in)	71 kg (157 lb)	287 cm (113 in)	278 cm (109 in)
13	(Brazil) Heloiza Pereira	2 November 1990	1.87 m (6 ft 2 in)	77 kg (170 lb)	305 cm (120 in)	288 cm (113 in)
14	(Brazil) Fabiana Oliveira	7 March 1980	1.69 m (5 ft 7 in)	59 kg (130 lb)	276 cm (109 in)	266 cm (105 in)
15	(Brazil) Ana Carolina da Silva	8 April 1991	1.83 m (6 ft 0 in)	73 kg (161 lb)	290 cm (110 in)	290 cm (110 in)
16	(Brazil) Stephanie Corrêa	15 July 1994	1.88 m (6 ft 2 in)	63 kg (139 lb)	295 cm (116 in)	279 cm (110 in)
17	(Brazil) Drussyla Costa	1 July 1996	1.86 m (6 ft 1 in)	70 kg (150 lb)	310 cm (120 in)	270 cm (110 in)
18	(Brazil) Mikaella Costa	14 June 1997	1.75 m (5 ft 9 in)	77 kg (170 lb)	275 cm (108 in)	270 cm (110 in)

=== Pomi Casalmaggiore ===
The following is the roster of the Italian club Pomi Casalmaggiore in the 2016 FIVB Volleyball Women's Club World Championship.

Head coach: (Italy) Giovanni Caprara

No.	Name	Date of birth	Height	Weight	Spike	Block
1	(Italy) Lucia Bacchi	4 January 1981	1.81 m (5 ft 11 in)	74 kg (163 lb)	301 cm (119 in)	276 cm (109 in)
3	(United States) Carli Lloyd	6 August 1989	1.80 m (5 ft 11 in)	75 kg (165 lb)	313 cm (123 in)	295 cm (116 in)
4	(Croatia) Klara Perić	30 March 1998	1.85 m (6 ft 1 in)	71 kg (157 lb)	301 cm (119 in)	286 cm (113 in)
5	(Italy) Immacolata Sirressi	19 May 1990	1.75 m (5 ft 9 in)	62 kg (137 lb)	281 cm (111 in)	264 cm (104 in)
6	(Romania) Carmen Țurlea	18 November 1975	1.83 m (6 ft 0 in)	69 kg (152 lb)	310 cm (120 in)	302 cm (119 in)
8	(United States) Lauren Gibbemeyer	8 September 1989	1.87 m (6 ft 2 in)	71 kg (157 lb)	307 cm (121 in)	293 cm (115 in)
0	(Italy) Lucia Bosetti	9 July 1989	1.75 m (5 ft 9 in)	65 kg (143 lb)	316 cm (124 in)	286 cm (113 in)
10	(Italy) Giulia Gibertini	30 September 1984	1.73 m (5 ft 8 in)	57 kg (126 lb)	281 cm (111 in)	264 cm (104 in)
12	(Italy) Anastasia Guerra	15 October 1996	1.87 m (6 ft 2 in)	80 kg (180 lb)	314 cm (124 in)	239 cm (94 in)
13	(Croatia) Samanta Fabris	8 February 1992	1.90 m (6 ft 3 in)	86 kg (190 lb)	326 cm (128 in)	313 cm (123 in)
15	(Serbia) Jovana Stevanović	30 June 1992	1.92 m (6 ft 4 in)	75 kg (165 lb)	308 cm (121 in)	295 cm (116 in)
16	(Italy) Valentina Tirozzi (C)	26 March 1986	1.81 m (5 ft 11 in)	69 kg (152 lb)	304 cm (120 in)	292 cm (115 in)
18	(Croatia) Tamara Sušić	28 November 1990	1.93 m (6 ft 4 in)	72 kg (159 lb)	318 cm (125 in)	308 cm (121 in)

=== Eczacıbaşı VitrA ===
The following is the roster of the Turkish club Eczacıbaşı VitrA İstanbul in the 2016 FIVB Volleyball Women's Club World Championship.

Head coach: (Italy) Massimo Barbolini

No.	Name	Date of birth	Height	Weight	Spike	Block
1	(Turkey) Gizem Asçi	26 January 1998	1.78 m (5 ft 10 in)	65 kg (143 lb)	250 cm (98 in)	220 cm (87 in)
2	(Turkey) Gülden Kuzubaşıoğlu	5 December 1980	1.67 m (5 ft 6 in)	58 kg (128 lb)	250 cm (98 in)	240 cm (94 in)
3	(Serbia) Tijana Bošković	8 March 1997	1.91 m (6 ft 3 in)	79 kg (174 lb)	310 cm (120 in)	300 cm (120 in)
5	(Turkey) Simge Aköz	23 April 1991	1.68 m (5 ft 6 in)	55 kg (121 lb)	250 cm (98 in)	245 cm (96 in)
6	(Brazil) Thaísa Menezes	15 May 1987	1.96 m (6 ft 5 in)	79 kg (174 lb)	316 cm (124 in)	301 cm (119 in)
7	(Turkey) Hande Baladın	11 September 1997	1.89 m (6 ft 2 in)	71 kg (157 lb)	295 cm (116 in)	293 cm (115 in)
8	(United States) Rachael Adams	3 June 1990	1.88 m (6 ft 2 in)	81 kg (179 lb)	318 cm (125 in)	307 cm (121 in)
9	(Turkey) Büşra Kılıçlı	16 July 1990	1.88 m (6 ft 2 in)	84 kg (185 lb)	297 cm (117 in)	291 cm (115 in)
10	(United States) Jordan Larson	16 October 1986	1.87 m (6 ft 2 in)	74 kg (163 lb)	302 cm (119 in)	295 cm (116 in)
11	(Turkey) Nilay Özdemir	24 October 1985	1.79 m (5 ft 10 in)	63 kg (139 lb)	286 cm (113 in)	280 cm (110 in)
14	(Turkey) Gözde Yılmaz	9 September 1991	1.95 m (6 ft 5 in)	78 kg (172 lb)	306 cm (120 in)	299 cm (118 in)
15	(Russia) Tatiana Kosheleva	23 December 1988	1.91 m (6 ft 3 in)	67 kg (148 lb)	315 cm (124 in)	305 cm (120 in)
16	(Turkey) Ceylan Arısan	1 January 1994	1.93 m (6 ft 4 in)	78 kg (172 lb)	305 cm (120 in)	295 cm (116 in)
17	(Turkey) Neslihan Demir	9 December 1983	1.87 m (6 ft 2 in)	72 kg (159 lb)	300 cm (120 in)	290 cm (110 in)
18	(Serbia) Maja Ognjenović	6 August 1984	1.83 m (6 ft 0 in)	67 kg (148 lb)	300 cm (120 in)	293 cm (115 in)

== Pool B ==
=== Hisamitsu Springs ===
The following is the roster of the Japanese club Hisamitsu Springs Kobe in the 2016 FIVB Volleyball Women's Club World Championship.

- Head coach: (Japan) Kumi Nakada

No.	Name	Date of birth	Height	Weight	Spike	Block
1	(Japan) Miyu Nagaoka (C)	25 July 1991	1.79 m (5 ft 10 in)	68 kg (150 lb)	310 cm (120 in)	398 cm (157 in)
2	(Japan) Chizuru Kotō	8 October 1982	1.71 m (5 ft 7 in)	64 kg (141 lb)	295 cm (116 in)	282 cm (111 in)
3	(Japan) Risa Shinnabe	11 July 1990	1.73 m (5 ft 8 in)	66 kg (146 lb)	295 cm (116 in)	268 cm (106 in)
4	(Japan) Nana Iwasaka	3 July 1990	1.87 m (6 ft 2 in)	72 kg (159 lb)	300 cm (120 in)	285 cm (112 in)
5	(Japan) Yumi Mizuta	30 November 1986	1.81 m (5 ft 11 in)	67 kg (148 lb)	299 cm (118 in)	290 cm (110 in)
6	(Japan) Yuki Ishii	8 May 1991	1.80 m (5 ft 11 in)	68 kg (150 lb)	302 cm (119 in)	286 cm (113 in)
8	(Japan) Rika Nomoto	21 September 1991	1.79 m (5 ft 10 in)	70 kg (150 lb)	310 cm (120 in)	279 cm (110 in)
9	(Poland) Maja Tokarska	22 February 1991	1.93 m (6 ft 4 in)	72 kg (159 lb)	325 cm (128 in)	293 cm (115 in)
11	(Japan) Erika Sakae	3 April 1991	1.68 m (5 ft 6 in)	53 kg (117 lb)	273 cm (107 in)	267 cm (105 in)
14	(Japan) Fumika Moriya	7 April 1992	1.80 m (5 ft 11 in)	75 kg (165 lb)	302 cm (119 in)	285 cm (112 in)
15	(Japan) Ayano Nakaoji	24 July 1991	1.67 m (5 ft 6 in)	64 kg (141 lb)	289 cm (114 in)	279 cm (110 in)
16	(Japan) Risa Ishibashi	3 February 1990	1.78 m (5 ft 10 in)	62 kg (137 lb)	292 cm (115 in)	279 cm (110 in)
18	(Japan) Mana Toe	18 May 1994	1.63 m (5 ft 4 in)	60 kg (130 lb)	292 cm (115 in)	278 cm (109 in)
20	(Japan) Sayaka Tsutsui	29 September 1992	1.58 m (5 ft 2 in)	51 kg (112 lb)	255 cm (100 in)	245 cm (96 in)

=== Bangkok Glass ===
The following is the roster of the Thai club Bangkok Glass in the 2016 FIVB Volleyball Women's Club World Championship.

- Head coach: (Thailand) Kittipong Pornchartyingcheep

No.	Name	Date of birth	Height	Weight	Spike	Block
1	(Thailand) Maliwan Prabnarong	27 August 1990	1.73 m (5 ft 8 in)	58 kg (128 lb)	280 cm (110 in)	275 cm (108 in)
5	(Thailand) Pleumjit Thinkaow (C)	9 November 1983	1.80 m (5 ft 11 in)	64 kg (141 lb)	298 cm (117 in)	293 cm (115 in)
6	(Thailand) Thidarat Pengwichai	28 November 1992	1.78 m (5 ft 10 in)	75 kg (165 lb)	290 cm (110 in)	280 cm (110 in)
8	(Thailand) Wilavan Apinyapong	6 June 1984	1.74 m (5 ft 9 in)	67 kg (148 lb)	294 cm (116 in)	280 cm (110 in)
9	(Thailand) Jarasporn Bundasak	1 March 1993	1.80 m (5 ft 11 in)	64 kg (141 lb)	293 cm (115 in)	285 cm (112 in)
10	(Thailand) Jutarat Montripila	2 October 1986	1.75 m (5 ft 9 in)	67 kg (148 lb)	290 cm (110 in)	280 cm (110 in)
11	(Thailand) Pornpun Guedpard	5 May 1993	1.72 m (5 ft 8 in)	70 kg (150 lb)	294 cm (116 in)	290 cm (110 in)
12	(Thailand) Karina Krause	12 February 1989	1.78 m (5 ft 10 in)	65 kg (143 lb)	295 cm (116 in)	285 cm (112 in)
13	(Thailand) Witita Balee	27 March 1991	1.70 m (5 ft 7 in)	56 kg (123 lb)	270 cm (110 in)	262 cm (103 in)
14	(Thailand) Rasamee Supamool	10 January 1992	1.80 m (5 ft 11 in)	68 kg (150 lb)	285 cm (112 in)	276 cm (109 in)
15	(Thailand) Tikamporn Changkeaw	12 December 1984	1.66 m (5 ft 5 in)	65 kg (143 lb)	270 cm (110 in)	258 cm (102 in)
16	(United States) Ashley Frazier	15 December 1989	1.87 m (6 ft 2 in)	70 kg (150 lb)	302 cm (119 in)	294 cm (116 in)
17	(Thailand) Wanida Kotruang	29 June 1990	1.70 m (5 ft 7 in)	60 kg (130 lb)	283 cm (111 in)	272 cm (107 in)
20	(Vietnam) Nguyễn Thị Ngọc Hoa	10 November 1987	1.83 m (6 ft 0 in)	64 kg (141 lb)	305 cm (120 in)	300 cm (120 in)

=== Vakıfbank İstanbul ===
The following is the roster of the Turkish club Vakıfbank İstanbul in the 2016 FIVB Volleyball Women's Club World Championship.

- Head coach: (Italy) Giovanni Guidetti

No.	Name	Date of birth	Height	Weight	Spike	Block
1	(Turkey) Gizem Örge	26 April 1993	1.70 m (5 ft 7 in)	60 kg (130 lb)	280 cm (110 in)	270 cm (110 in)
2	(Turkey) Gözde Sonsırma (C)	25 November 1985	1.83 m (6 ft 0 in)	70 kg (150 lb)	297 cm (117 in)	292 cm (115 in)
3	(Turkey) Cansu Özbay	17 October 1996	1.82 m (6 ft 0 in)	75 kg (165 lb)	285 cm (112 in)	284 cm (112 in)
5	(China) Zhu Ting	29 November 1994	1.95 m (6 ft 5 in)	78 kg (172 lb)	327 cm (129 in)	300 cm (120 in)
6	(Turkey) Kübra Akman	13 October 1994	1.97 m (6 ft 6 in)	88 kg (194 lb)	320 cm (130 in)	315 cm (124 in)
8	(Turkey) Melis Gürkaynak	20 April 1990	1.85 m (6 ft 1 in)	72 kg (159 lb)	295 cm (116 in)	285 cm (112 in)
9	(Turkey) Ayça Aykaç	27 February 1996	1.75 m (5 ft 9 in)	63 kg (139 lb)	270 cm (110 in)	260 cm (100 in)
10	(Netherlands) Lonneke Slöetjes	15 November 1990	1.92 m (6 ft 4 in)	72 kg (159 lb)	322 cm (127 in)	315 cm (124 in)
11	(Turkey) Naz Aydemir	14 August 1990	1.86 m (6 ft 1 in)	70 kg (150 lb)	304 cm (120 in)	300 cm (120 in)
12	(Turkey) Özgenur Yurtdagülen	6 August 1993	1.93 m (6 ft 4 in)	72 kg (159 lb)	300 cm (120 in)	288 cm (113 in)
14	(Turkey) Melis Durul	21 October 1993	1.85 m (6 ft 1 in)	65 kg (143 lb)	280 cm (110 in)	275 cm (108 in)
15	(United States) Kimberly Hill	30 November 1989	1.94 m (6 ft 4 in)	72 kg (159 lb)	320 cm (130 in)	310 cm (120 in)
16	(Serbia) Milena Rašić	25 October 1990	1.93 m (6 ft 4 in)	75 kg (165 lb)	315 cm (124 in)	310 cm (120 in)
17	(Turkey) Cansu Çetin	26 May 1993	1.83 m (6 ft 0 in)	69 kg (152 lb)	295 cm (116 in)	285 cm (112 in)

=== Voléro Zürich ===
The following is the roster of the Switzerland's club Voléro Zürich in the 2016 FIVB Volleyball Women's Club World Championship.

Head coach: (Serbia) Zoran Terzić

No.	Name	Date of birth	Height	Weight	Spike	Block
1	(Switzerland) Julie Lengweiler	6 November 1998	1.88 m (6 ft 2 in)	69 kg (152 lb)	305 cm (120 in)	300 cm (120 in)
3	(Brazil) Fabíola de Souza	3 February 1983	1.84 m (6 ft 0 in)	70 kg (150 lb)	300 cm (120 in)	285 cm (112 in)
4	(Serbia) Bojana Živković	29 March 1988	1.86 m (6 ft 1 in)	72 kg (159 lb)	300 cm (120 in)	292 cm (115 in)
5	(Bulgaria) Dobriana Rabadzhieva	14 June 1991	1.94 m (6 ft 4 in)	72 kg (159 lb)	305 cm (120 in)	285 cm (112 in)
6	(Switzerland) Gabi Schottroff	8 February 1997	1.92 m (6 ft 4 in)	78 kg (172 lb)	302 cm (119 in)	285 cm (112 in)
7	(Ukraine) Olesia Rykhliuk	11 December 1987	1.96 m (6 ft 5 in)	83 kg (183 lb)	316 cm (124 in)	304 cm (120 in)
8	(Serbia) Silvija Popović	15 March 1986	1.78 m (5 ft 10 in)	65 kg (143 lb)	276 cm (109 in)	266 cm (105 in)
9	(Azerbaijan) Natalya Mammadova	2 December 1984	1.96 m (6 ft 5 in)	78 kg (172 lb)	319 cm (126 in)	302 cm (119 in)
10	(Russia) Irina Malkova	23 March 1989	1.92 m (6 ft 4 in)	80 kg (180 lb)	306 cm (120 in)	294 cm (116 in)
12	(Brazil) Mariana Costa	30 July 1986	1.81 m (5 ft 11 in)	73 kg (161 lb)	295 cm (116 in)	283 cm (111 in)
13	(Turkey) Gizem Karadayı	14 January 1987	1.78 m (5 ft 10 in)	60 kg (130 lb)	290 cm (110 in)	285 cm (112 in)
14	(Cuba) Kenia Carcaces	22 January 1986	1.90 m (6 ft 3 in)	78 kg (172 lb)	322 cm (127 in)	300 cm (120 in)
15	(Russia) Ekaterina Orlova	21 October 1987	1.93 m (6 ft 4 in)	77 kg (170 lb)	307 cm (121 in)	301 cm (119 in)
16	(United States) Foluke Akinradewo	5 October 1987	1.91 m (6 ft 3 in)	79 kg (174 lb)	331 cm (130 in)	300 cm (120 in)
17	(Switzerland) Laura Unternährer	11 July 1993	1.79 m (5 ft 10 in)	70 kg (150 lb)	303 cm (119 in)	283 cm (111 in)
