= 2014–15 CEV Women's Champions League =

- League: CEV Women's Champions League
- Sport: Volleyball
- Duration: November 11, 2014 – April 5, 2015

Finals
- Champions: (Turkey) Eczacıbaşı VitrA
- Finals MVP: (United States) Jordan Larson

CEV Women's Champions League seasons
- ← 2013–14 2015–16 →

The CEV Champions League is the highest level of European club volleyball in the 2014–15 season and the 56th edition. It ran from November 2014 until April 2015.

Eczacıbaşı VitrA won the title for the first time by defeating Yamamay Busto Arsizio 3–0 in the final.

== Teams ==
The number of participants on the basis of ranking list for European Cup Competitions:

Rank	Country	Number of teams	Teams
1	Turkey	3	VakıfBank Istanbul (1); Fenerbahçe Grundig Istanbul (2); Eczacıbaşı VitrA Istanbul (3)
2	Russia	3	Dinamo Kazan; Dinamo Moscow; Omichka Omsk Region
3	Italy	2	Nordmeccanica Piacenza; Unendo Yamamay Busto Arsizio
4	Azerbaijan	2	Rabita Baku (1); Azeryol Baku (2)
5	France	2	RC Cannes; Nantes VB
6	Poland	2	Chemik Police; Impel Wrocław
7	Germany	1	Dresdner SC
8	Switzerland	1	Voléro Zürich
9	Romania	1	Ştiinţa Bacău
10	Serbia	1	Partizan Vizura Beograd
11	Czech Republic	1	Agel Prostějov
12	Austria	0^{1}	–
13	Belgium	0^{1}	–
16	Finland	0+1	LP Salo ^{(W/C)}

1. Clubs from Austria and Belgium do not meet the listing requirements and/or refusing.

== League round ==
20 teams were drawn to 5 pools of 4 teams each.
The 1st and 2nd and the two bests 3rd ranked qualified for the Playoff 12
The organizer of the Final Four were determined after the end of the League Round and qualified directly for the Final Four.
The team of the organizer of the Final Four was replaced by the third best 3rd ranked team with the best score.

The remaining third-placed teams as well 2 four-placed teams with the best score will move to the Challenge Round of the CEV Cup.

The remaining teams will be eliminated.

In the League Round, the placing of the teams is determined by the number of matches won.

In case of a tie in the number of matches won by two or more teams, they will be ranked on the basis of the following criteria:

- match points;
- set quotient (the number of total sets won divided by the number of total sets lost);
- points quotient (the number of total points scored divided by the number of total points lost);
- results of head-to-head matches between the teams in question.

=== Pool A ===
Pos	Team	Pld	W	L	Pts	SW	SL	SR	SPW	SPL	SPR
1	(Poland) Chemik Police	6	4	2	13	16	9	1.778	543	506	1.073
2	(Russia) Dinamo Kazan	6	3	3	9	13	11	1.182	529	497	1.064
3	(Czech Republic) Agel Prostějov	6	3	3	7	10	14	0.714	488	543	0.899
4	(Azerbaijan) Rabita Baku	6	2	4	7	10	15	0.667	523	537	0.974

Date	Time		Score		Set 1	Set 2	Set 3	Set 4	Set 5	Total	Report
12 Nov	18:00	Chemik Police (Poland)	3–0	(Azerbaijan) Rabita Baku	25–22	25–19	25–18			75–59	Report
13 Nov	19:00	Dinamo Kazan (Russia)	3–0	(Czech Republic) Agel Prostějov	25–21	25–15	26–24			76–60	Report
26 Nov	17:00	Rabita Baku (Azerbaijan)	3–2	(Russia) Dinamo Kazan	22–25	23–25	28–26	25–21	15–9	113–106	Report
26 Nov	17:30	Agel Prostějov (Czech Republic)	0–3	(Poland) Chemik Police	23–25	22–25	19–25			64–75	Report
10 Dec	17:30	Dinamo Kazan (Russia)	3–2	(Poland) Chemik Police	25–13	20–25	26–24	23–25	15–10	109–97	Report
10 Dec	19:00	Agel Prostějov (Czech Republic)	3–2	(Azerbaijan) Rabita Baku	25–19	23–25	27–25	17–25	15–13	107–107	Report
14 Jan	18:00	Chemik Police (Poland)	3–1	(Russia) Dinamo Kazan	16–25	25–14	25–19	25–22		91–80	Report
15 Jan	17:00	Rabita Baku (Azerbaijan)	3–1	(Czech Republic) Agel Prostějov	25–21	25–12	23–25	25–15		98–73	Report
20 Jan	18:00	Chemik Police (Poland)	2–3	(Czech Republic) Agel Prostějov	25–11	20–25	25–17	22–25	12–15	104–93	Report
22 Jan	19:00	Dinamo Kazan (Russia)	3–0	(Azerbaijan) Rabita Baku	25–21	25–10	25–14			75–45	Report
28 Jan	17:00	Rabita Baku (Azerbaijan)	2–3	(Poland) Chemik Police	25–27	25–18	16–25	25–16	10–15	101–101	Report
28 Jan	17:30	Agel Prostějov (Czech Republic)	3–1	(Russia) Dinamo Kazan	25–19	25–22	16–25	25–17		91–83	Report

=== Pool B ===
Pos	Team	Pld	W	L	Pts	SW	SL	SR	SPW	SPL	SPR
1	(Turkey) Fenerbahçe Grundig Istanbul	6	6	0	18	18	1	18.000	470	323	1.455
2	(Azerbaijan) Azeryol Baku	6	4	2	11	13	8	1.625	476	437	1.089
3	(France) Nantes VB	6	1	5	4	6	15	0.400	402	477	0.843
4	(Romania) Ştiinţa Bacău	6	1	5	3	3	16	0.188	346	457	0.757

Date	Time		Score		Set 1	Set 2	Set 3	Set 4	Set 5	Total	Report
12 Nov	18:00	Azeryol Baku (Azerbaijan)	3–2	(France) Nantes VB	25–17	18–25	18–25	25–16	20–18	106–101	Report
13 Nov	18:00	Ştiinţa Bacău (Romania)	0–3	(Turkey) Fenerbahçe Istanbul	13–25	16–25	21–25			50–75	Report
26 Nov	19:00	Fenerbahçe Istanbul (Turkey)	3–1	(Azerbaijan) Azeryol Baku	25–21	25–20	19–25	25–16		94–82	Report
26 Nov	20:00	Nantes VB (France)	3–0	(Romania) Ştiinţa Bacău	25–18	27–25	25–10			77–53	Report
9 Dec	20:00	Nantes VB (France)	0–3	(Turkey) Fenerbahçe Istanbul	15–25	19–25	15–25			49–75	Report
10 Dec	18:00	Azeryol Baku (Azerbaijan)	3–0	(Romania) Ştiinţa Bacău	27–25	25–10	25–23			77–58	Report
14 Jan	17:00	Fenerbahçe Istanbul (Turkey)	3–0	(France) Nantes VB	25–15	25–14	25–14			75–43	Report
14 Jan	17:00	Ştiinţa Bacău (Romania)	0–3	(Azerbaijan) Azeryol Baku	22–25	14–25	18–25			54–75	Report
21 Jan	17:00	Ştiinţa Bacău (Romania)	3–1	(France) Nantes VB	25–20	25–14	16–25	25–19		91–78	Report
21 Jan	18:00	Azeryol Baku (Azerbaijan)	0–3	(Turkey) Fenerbahçe Istanbul	20–25	15–25	24–26			59–76	Report
28 Jan	19:00	Fenerbahçe Istanbul (Turkey)	3–0	(Romania) Ştiinţa Bacău	25–16	25–11	25–13			75–40	Report
28 Jan	20:00	Nantes VB (France)	0–3	(Azerbaijan) Azeryol Baku	12–25	25–27	17–25			54–77	Report

=== Pool C ===
Pos	Team	Pld	W	L	Pts	SW	SL	SR	SPW	SPL	SPR
1	(Russia) Dinamo Moscow	6	5	1	15	17	8	2.125	569	515	1.105
2	(Italy) Yamamay Busto Arsizio	6	4	2	12	15	8	1.875	518	465	1.114
3	(Germany) Dresdner SC	6	3	3	7	9	14	0.643	485	506	0.958
4	(Finland) LP Salo	6	0	6	2	7	18	0.389	494	580	0.852

Date	Time		Score		Set 1	Set 2	Set 3	Set 4	Set 5	Total	Report
12 Nov	19:30	Dresdner SC (Germany)	3–2	(Russia) Dinamo Moscow	22–25	23–25	25–19	25–20	18–16	113–105	Report
12 Nov	20:30	Yamamay Busto Arsizio (Italy)	3–0	(Finland) LP Salo	25–19	25–20	25–12			75–51	Report
26 Nov	19:00	Dinamo Moscow (Russia)	3–1	(Italy) Yamamay Busto Arsizio	22–25	25–21	25–15	25–19		97–80	Report
27 Nov	18:30	LP Salo (Finland)	2–3	(Germany) Dresdner SC	25–20	18–25	22–25	25–23	11–15	101–108	Report
9 Dec	18:30	LP Salo (Finland)	1–3	(Russia) Dinamo Moscow	25–23	16–25	22–25	16–25		79–98	Report
10 Dec	20:30	Yamamay Busto Arsizio (Italy)	3–0	(Germany) Dresdner SC	25–15	25–16	25–20			75–51	Report
13 Jan	19:00	Dinamo Moscow (Russia)	3–1	(Finland) LP Salo	25–16	18–25	25–21	25–20		93–82	Report
14 Jan	19:30	Dresdner SC (Germany)	0–3	(Italy) Yamamay Busto Arsizio	21–25	18–25	20–25			59–75	Report
21 Jan	19:30	Dresdner SC (Germany)	3–1	(Finland) LP Salo	23–25	25–21	25–12	25–17		98–75	Report
21 Jan	20:30	Yamamay Busto Arsizio (Italy)	2–3	(Russia) Dinamo Moscow	22–25	25–16	20–25	25–20	13–15	105–101	Report
28 Jan	18:30	LP Salo (Finland)	2–3	(Italy) Yamamay Busto Arsizio	26–28	25–18	25–19	14–25	16–18	106–108	Report
28 Jan	19:00	Dinamo Moscow (Russia)	3–0	(Germany) Dresdner SC	25–17	25–21	25–18			75–56	Report

=== Pool D ===
Pos	Team	Pld	W	L	Pts	SW	SL	SR	SPW	SPL	SPR
1	(Turkey) Eczacıbaşı VitrA Istanbul	6	5	1	15	15	6	2.500	508	435	1.168
2	(Switzerland) Voléro Zürich	6	5	1	14	16	6	2.667	518	445	1.164
3	(Russia) Omichka Omsk Region	6	2	4	7	9	13	0.692	465	504	0.923
4	(Poland) Impel Wrocław	6	0	6	0	3	18	0.167	414	521	0.795

Date	Time		Score		Set 1	Set 2	Set 3	Set 4	Set 5	Total	Report
12 Nov	17:00	Eczacıbaşı VitrA Istanbul (Turkey)	3–0	(Russia) Omichka Omsk Region	25–18	25–18	25–23			75–59	Report
13 Nov	20:00	Voléro Zürich (Switzerland)	3–0	(Poland) Impel Wrocław	25–19	25–9	25–20			75–48	Report
25 Nov	19:00	Impel Wrocław (Poland)	0–3	(Turkey) Eczacıbaşı VitrA Istanbul	29–31	16–25	21–25			66–81	Report
27 Nov	19:00	Omichka Omsk Region (Russia)	2–3	(Switzerland) Voléro Zürich	22–25	22–25	26–24	25–21	11–15	106–110	Report
9 Dec	19:00	Impel Wrocław (Poland)	0–3	(Russia) Omichka Omsk Region	20–25	24–26	18–25			62–76	Report
11 Dec	20:00	Voléro Zürich (Switzerland)	1–3	(Turkey) Eczacıbaşı VitrA Istanbul	25–20	23–25	16–25	25–27		89–97	Report
13 Jan	17:00	Eczacıbaşı VitrA Istanbul (Turkey)	0–3	(Switzerland) Voléro Zürich	23–25	22–25	16–25			61–75	Report
14 Jan	19:00	Omichka Omsk Region (Russia)	3–1	(Poland) Impel Wrocław	25–14	25–23	24–26	25–21		99–84	Report
22 Jan	17:00	Eczacıbaşı VitrA Istanbul (Turkey)	3–1	(Poland) Impel Wrocław	25–19	21–25	25–10	25–16		96–70	Report
22 Jan	20:00	Voléro Zürich (Switzerland)	3–0	(Russia) Omichka Omsk Region	25–15	25–17	25–17			75–49	Report
28 Jan	19:00	Omichka Omsk Region (Russia)	1–3	(Turkey) Eczacıbaşı VitrA Istanbul	16–25	25–23	16–25	19–25		76–98	Report
28 Jan	19:00	Impel Wrocław (Poland)	1–3	(Switzerland) Voléro Zürich	22–25	25–19	22–25	15–25		84–94	Report

=== Pool E ===
Pos	Team	Pld	W	L	Pts	SW	SL	SR	SPW	SPL	SPR
1	(Turkey) VakıfBank Istanbul	6	5	1	14	16	5	3.200	509	368	1.383
2	(France) RC Cannes	6	4	2	9	13	10	1.300	493	467	1.056
3	(Italy) Nordmeccanica Piacenza	6	3	3	11	12	13	0.923	508	558	0.910
4	(Serbia) Partizan Vizura Beograd	6	0	6	2	5	18	0.278	419	536	0.782

Date	Time		Score		Set 1	Set 2	Set 3	Set 4	Set 5	Total	Report
12 Nov	20:30	RC Cannes (France)	3–2	(Italy) Nordmeccanica Piacenza	16–25	25–21	15–25	25–23	15–12	96–106	Report
13 Nov	20:30	VakıfBank Istanbul (Turkey)	3–0	(Serbia) Partizan Vizura Beograd	25–18	25–10	25–19			75–47	Report
25 Nov	19:00	Partizan Vizura Beograd (Serbia)	2–3	(France) RC Cannes	22–25	25–18	25–19	20–25	12–15	104–102	Report
26 Nov	20:30	Nordmeccanica Piacenza (Italy)	0–3	(Turkey) VakıfBank Istanbul	12–25	14–25	18–25			44–75	Report
9 Dec	19:00	Partizan Vizura Beograd (Serbia)	0–3	(Italy) Nordmeccanica Piacenza	15–25	16–25	20–25			51–75	Report
11 Dec	20:30	VakıfBank Istanbul (Turkey)	1–3	(France) RC Cannes	23–25	25–23	24–26	25–27		97–101	Report
13 Jan	20:30	RC Cannes (France)	0–3	(Turkey) VakıfBank Istanbul	11–25	22–25	12–25			45–75	Report
14 Jan	20:30	Nordmeccanica Piacenza (Italy)	3–1	(Serbia) Partizan Vizura Beograd	22–25	25–16	25–22	25–18		97–81	Report
21 Jan	20:30	VakıfBank Istanbul (Turkey)	3–2	(Italy) Nordmeccanica Piacenza	19–25	22–25	25–14	25–13	21–19	112–96	Report
21 Jan	20:30	RC Cannes (France)	3–2	(Serbia) Partizan Vizura Beograd	23–25	25–13	25–22	21–25	18–16	112–101	Report
28 Jan	19:00	Partizan Vizura Beograd (Serbia)	0–3	(Turkey) VakıfBank Istanbul	13–25	11–25	11–25			35–75	Report
28 Jan	20:30	Nordmeccanica Piacenza (Italy)	3–0	(France) RC Cannes	25–16	25–18	25–18			75–52	Report

== Playoffs ==
The playoffs will consist of two rounds: Playoff 12 and Playoff 6. Each round is played in two legs. These will be played between 10 February and 12 March 2015.

If the teams are tied after two legs, a "Golden Set" is played. The winner is the team that first obtains 15 points, provided that the points difference between the two teams is at least 2 points (thus, the Golden Set is similar to a tiebreak set in a normal match).

At each leg, points are awarded to the teams in the same manner as in the Group Round (3 for 3:0 or 3:1, 2 for 3:2 etc.). So, if team A defeat team B in the first leg 3:0 and lose in the second leg 1:3, team A does not advance to the next round (as it would have been expected on the basis of analogy with football competitions), but the two teams are tied with 3 points each, and a Golden Set is played.

The three teams that win in Playoff 6 round advance to the Final Four along with the organizer of the Final Four. Germany's Dresdner SC will replace in the Playoffs 12 the organizer of the Final Four tournament as the lucky loser.

Pool	Winners	Runners-up	Third place
A	(Poland) Chemik Police (F4 Hosts)	(Russia) Dinamo Kazan	(Czech Republic) Agel Prostějov
B	(Turkey) Fenerbahçe Grundig Istanbul	(Azerbaijan) Azeryol Baku	–
C	(Russia) Dinamo Moscow	(Italy) Yamamay Busto Arsizio	(Germany) Dresdner SC
D	(Turkey) Eczacıbaşı VitrA Istanbul	(Switzerland) Voléro Zürich	–
E	(Turkey) VakıfBank Istanbul	(France) RC Cannes	(Italy) Nordmeccanica Piacenza

=== Playoff 12 ===
Team 1	Agg.	Team 2	1st leg	2nd leg
Dinamo Kazan (Russia)	1–5	(Turkey) VakıfBank Istanbul	2–3	0–3
Dresdner SC (Germany)	2–4	(Turkey) Fenerbahçe Grundig Istanbul	0–3	3–2
RC Cannes (France)	1–5	(Switzerland) Voléro Zürich	2–3	1–3
Agel Prostějov (Czech Republic)	0–6	(Turkey) Eczacıbaşı VitrA Istanbul	1–3	0–3
Azeryol Baku (Azerbaijan)	2–4	(Italy) Yamamay Busto Arsizio	1–3	3–2
Nordmeccanica Piacenza (Italy)	0–6	(Russia) Dinamo Moscow	0–3	0–3

==== First leg ====
Date	Time		Score		Set 1	Set 2	Set 3	Set 4	Set 5	Total	Report
10 Feb	18:00	Agel Prostějov (Czech Republic)	1–3	(Turkey) Eczacıbaşı VitrA Istanbul	25–18	15–25	14–25	21–25		75–93	Report
10 Feb	19:00	Dinamo Kazan (Russia)	2–3	(Turkey) VakıfBank Istanbul	26–24	21–25	20–25	27–25	7–15	101–114	Report
11 Feb	18:00	Azeryol Baku (Azerbaijan)	1–3	(Italy) Yamamay Busto Arsizio	24–26	21–25	25–19	14–25		84–95	Report
11 Feb	19:30	Dresdner SC (Germany)	0–3	(Turkey) Fenerbahçe Istanbul	23–25	15–25	15–25			53–75	Report
11 Feb	20:00	RC Cannes (France)	2–3	(Switzerland) Voléro Zürich	25–21	9–25	25–16	17–25	5–15	81–102	Report
11 Feb	20:30	Nordmeccanica Piacenza (Italy)	0–3	(Russia) Dinamo Moscow	27–29	18–25	23–25			68–79	Report

==== Second leg ====
Date	Time		Score		Set 1	Set 2	Set 3	Set 4	Set 5	Total	Report
18 Feb	16:30	Eczacıbaşı VitrA Istanbul (Turkey)	3–0	(Czech Republic) Agel Prostějov	25–14	25–14	25–19			75–47	Report
18 Feb	19:30	Fenerbahçe Istanbul (Turkey)	2–3	(Germany) Dresdner SC	26–24	24–26	19–25	25–18	13–15	107–108	Report
18 Feb	20:30	Yamamay Busto Arsizio (Italy)	2–3	(Azerbaijan) Azeryol Baku	14–25	26–24	20–25	25–18	10–15	95–107	Report
19 Feb	18:30	Dinamo Moscow (Russia)	3–0	(Italy) Nordmeccanica Piacenza	25–20	25–16	25–15			75–51	Report
19 Feb	19:30	VakıfBank Istanbul (Turkey)	3–0	(Russia) Dinamo Kazan	25–22	25–21	25–14			75–57	Report
19 Feb	20:00	Voléro Zürich (Switzerland)	3–1	(France) RC Cannes	25–14	25–20	25–27	27–25		102–86	Report

=== Playoff 6 ===
Team 1	Agg.	Team 2	1st leg	2nd leg
VakıfBank Istanbul (Turkey)	4–2	(Turkey) Fenerbahçe Grundig Istanbul	3–1	2–3
Eczacıbaşı VitrA Istanbul (Turkey)	^{1}3–3	(Switzerland) Voléro Zürich	3–0	1–3
Yamamay Busto Arsizio (Italy)	6–0	(Russia) Dinamo Moscow	3–0	3–0

^{1}Eczacıbaşı VitrA Istanbul won the golden set 15–12

==== First leg ====
Date	Time		Score		Set 1	Set 2	Set 3	Set 4	Set 5	Total	Report
5 Mar	17:30	Eczacıbaşı VitrA (Turkey)	3–0	(Switzerland) Voléro Zürich	25–21	25–19	25–22			75–62	Report
5 Mar	20:30	VakıfBank Istanbul (Turkey)	3–1	(Turkey) Fenerbahçe Istanbul	25–23	28–26	19–25	25–16		97–90	Report
5 Mar	20:30	Yamamay Busto Arsizio (Italy)	3–0	(Russia) Dinamo Moscow	25–14	25–22	25–18			75–54	Report

==== Second leg ====
Date	Time		Score		Set 1	Set 2	Set 3	Set 4	Set 5	Total	Report
12 Mar	18:30	Fenerbahçe Istanbul (Turkey)	3–2	(Turkey) VakıfBank Istanbul	25–20	25–20	21–25	15–25	15–12	101–102	Report
12 Mar	18:30	Dinamo Moscow (Russia)	0–3	(Italy) Yamamay Busto Arsizio	23–25	19–25	26–28			68–78	Report
12 Mar	20:00	Voléro Zürich (Switzerland)	3–1	(Turkey) Eczacıbaşı VitrA Istanbul	25–23	24–26	29–27	25–19		103–95	Report

== Final four ==
- Organizer: (Poland) Chemik Police
- Venue: Azoty Arena, Szczecin, Poland
- All times are Central European Summer Time (UTC+02:00).
- In case that two teams from the same country qualify to the semifinals, they will have to play each other.

Semifinals
4 April
(Poland) Chemik Police	0
(Italy) Yamamay Busto Arsizio	3
4 April
(Turkey) VakıfBank Istanbul	1
(Turkey) Eczacıbaşı VitrA Istanbul	3

Final
5 April
(Italy) Yamamay Busto Arsizio	0
(Turkey) Eczacıbaşı VitrA Istanbul	3
3rd place match
5 April
(Poland) Chemik Police	0
(Turkey) VakıfBank Istanbul	3

=== Semifinals ===
Date	Time		Score		Set 1	Set 2	Set 3	Set 4	Set 5	Total	Report
4 Apr	15:00	Chemik Police (Poland)	0–3	(Italy) Yamamay Busto Arsizio	21–25	25–27	21–25			67–77	Report
4 Apr	18:00	VakıfBank Istanbul (Turkey)	1–3	(Turkey) Eczacıbaşı VitrA	22–25	25–16	22–25	22–25		91–91	Report

=== 3rd place match ===
Date	Time		Score		Set 1	Set 2	Set 3	Set 4	Set 5	Total	Report
5 Apr	15:00	Chemik Police (Poland)	0–3	(Turkey) VakıfBank Istanbul	19–25	21–25	17–25			57–75	Report

=== Final ===
Date	Time		Score		Set 1	Set 2	Set 3	Set 4	Set 5	Total	Report
5 Apr	18:00	Yamamay Busto Arsizio (Italy)	0–3	(Turkey) Eczacıbaşı VitrA	22–25	20–25	21–25			63–75	Report

== Final standing ==
Rank	Team
1st place, gold medalist(s)	(Turkey) Eczacıbaşı VitrA
2nd place, silver medalist(s)	(Italy) Yamamay Busto Arsizio
3rd place, bronze medalist(s)	(Turkey) VakıfBank Istanbul
4	(Poland) Chemik Police

2014–15 Women's Club European Champions

1st title

Roster for Final Four
De la Cruz, Kuzubaşıoğlu, Ercan, Arısan, Bağcı, Karakoyun, Cansu, Larson-Burbach, Özdemir, Gümüş, Fürst, Yılmaz, Demir, Poljak
Head coach
Caprara

== Awards ==
- Most valuable player
  (United States) Jordan Larson (Eczacıbaşı VitrA)
- Best setter
  (Serbia) Maja Ognjenović (Chemik Police)
- Best outside spikers
  (Dominican Republic) Bethania de la Cruz (Eczacıbaşı VitrA)
  (Czech Republic) Helena Havelková (Yamamay Busto Arsizio)
- Best middle blockers
  (Serbia) Milena Rašić (VakıfBank Istanbul)
  (Croatia) Maja Poljak (Eczacıbaşı VitrA)
- Best opposite spiker
  (Italy) Valentina Diouf (Yamamay Busto Arsizio)
- Best libero
  (Turkey) Gülden Kuzubaşıoğlu (Eczacıbaşı VitrA)
- Fair play award
  (Germany) Christiane Fürst (Eczacıbaşı VitrA)
