= Emily Hartong =

American volleyball player (born 1992)

Personal information
- Nationality: American
- Born: February 4, 1992 (age 34)
- Height: 1.87 m (6 ft 2 in)
- Weight: 75 kg (165 lb)
- Spike: 309 cm (122 in)
- Block: 295 cm (116 in)

Volleyball information
- Number: 17

Career
Years	Teams
2015	Voléro Zürich
2015-2016	Hyundai-Hillstate
2016-2017	Hyundai-Hillstate

Emily Hartong (born February 4, 1992) is an American female volleyball player. With her club Voléro Zürich she competed at the 2015 FIVB Volleyball Women's Club World Championship.

In 2015–16, she became a member of Hyundai-Hillstate volleyball club, and her team won the Korean Volleyball Pro League Championship. She won the league's Best Outside Hitter award, as she ranked 5th best scorer and 5th best defensive player of the league.

She and her team agreed to extend the contract, as she earned herself fame of "best foreign player of the year".

In the years 2018 and 2019, she was part of the United States women's national snow volleyball team.
