= Rachel Sánchez =

Cuban volleyball player (born 1989)

Personal information
- Full name: Rachel Sánchez Pérez
- Nationality: Cuban
- Born: 9 January 1989; Pinar del Río
- Hometown: Pinar del Río
- Height: 1.91 m (6 ft 3 in)
- Weight: 75 kg (165 lb)
- Spike: 325 cm (128 in)
- Block: 320 cm (130 in)

Volleyball information
- Position: Outside hitter, Middle blocker
- Current club: Panathinaikos

Career
Years	Teams
2008–2011; 2013–2014; 2014–2015; 2015–2016; 2016–2017; 2017–2018; 2018–2019; 2019–2020; 2020–2021	(Cuba) La Habana (Kazakhstan) Almaty VC (Switzerland) Volero Zürich (France) RC Cannes (Turkey) Trabzon İdmanocağı (Turkey) Halkbank Ankara (Turkey) Çanakkale Belediyespor (Turkey) İller Bankası (Greece) Panathinaikos

National team
2005–2010	Cuba
Honours
Women's volleyball
Representing Cuba
FIVB World Grand Prix
Silver medal – second place	2008 Yokohama	Team
Pan-American Cup
Gold medal – first place	2007 Colima	Team
Silver medal – second place	2006 San Juan	Team
Central American and Caribbean Games
Silver medal – second place	2006 Cartagena	Team
- Last updated: May 2015

Rachel Sánchez Pérez (born 9 January 1989 in Pinar del Río) is a Cuban volleyball player who competed in the 2008 Summer Olympics.

== Career ==
In 2008, she was a middle-blocker in the Cuban team that finished fourth in the Olympic tournament.

With her Cuban team Ciudad Habana at the Liga Nacional 2011, Sánchez won the MVP award and the championship.

Sánchez moved to the Kazakh League for the 2013/14, playing with Zhetyssu Almaty.

Sánchez won the bronze medal at the 2015 FIVB Club World Championship, playing with the Swiss club Voléro Zürich.

== Awards ==
=== Individual ===
- 2011 Cuban Liga Nacional "Most valuable player"

=== Club ===
- 2010 Cuban Liga Nacional - Champion, with Ciudad de La Habana
- 2011 Cuban Liga Nacional - Champion, with Ciudad de La Habana
- 2015 FIVB Club World Championship - Bronze medal, with Voléro Zürich
