= Mariana Costa (volleyball) =

Brazilian volleyball player (born 1986)

- Costa #25 in 2015

Personal information
- Full name: Mariana Andrade Costa
- Nickname: Mari Paraíba
- Nationality: Brazil
- Born: 30 July 1986 (age 40) Campina Grande, Paraíba, Brazil
- Height: 1.81 m (71 in)
- Weight: 75 kg (165 lb)
- Spike: 295 cm (116 in)
- Block: 283 cm (111 in)

Volleyball information
- Position: Outside Hitter
- Current club: Retired
- Number: 12

Career
- Years: Team
- 2004–2006 2006–2007 2007–2008 2008–2009 2009–2010 2010–2011 2011–2012 2013–2014 2014 2014–2016 2016–2017 2017–2019 2019–2020 2020–2021 2021–2022 2022–2023 2023 2023–2024: (Brazil) Osasco V.C. (Brazil) E.C. Pinheiros (Brazil) São Caetano E.C. (Brazil) Mackenzie E.C. (Brazil) São Caetano E.C. (Brazil) Desportivo Macaé (Brazil) Minas Tênis (Brazil) Grêmio Barueri (Brazil) Vôlei Bauru (Brazil) Minas Tênis (Switzerland) Volero Zürich (Brazil) Osasco V.C. (Italy) Pallavolo Monza (Brazil) Praia Clube (Greece) Olympiacos Piraeus (Brazil) Grêmio Barueri (Brazil) Campinas CV (Romania) CSM Bucuresti

National team
- Years: Team
- 2011–2016: Brazil
Honours
Women's volleyball
Representing Brazil
World Grand Prix
Bronze medal – third place	2015 Omaaha	Team
Gold medal – first place	2016 Bangkok	Team
Pan American Games
Silver medal – second place	2015 Toronto	Team
South American Championship
Gold medal – first place	2015 Cartagena
Summer Universiade
Gold medal – first place	2011 Shenzhen

Mariana Andrade Costa, also known as Mari Paraíba (born 30 July 1986) is a Brazilian female volleyball player. She was part of the Brazil women's national volleyball team. On club level, she played for various brazilian clubs as well as several european ones.

== Sporting achievements ==
=== National team ===
- 2011 Summer Universiade (Shenzhen, China)
- 2015 Pan American Games (Toronto, Canada)
- 2015 World Grand Prix (Omaha, Nebraska, United States)
- 2015 South American Championship (Cartagena, Colombia)
- 2016 World Grand Prix (Bangkok, Thailand)

== Clubs ==
=== International competitions ===
- 2017 2017 FIVB Club World Championship, with Voléro Zürich
- 2021 South American Club Championship, with Praia Clube

=== National championships ===
- 2004/2005 Brazilian Superliga, with Osasco Sao Paolo
- 2005/2006 Brazilian Superliga, with Osasco Sao Paolo
- 2015/2016 Brazilian Superliga, with Minas Tênis
- 2016/2017 Swiss Championship, with Volero Zürich
- 2018/2019 Brazilian Superliga, with Osasco Sao Paolo
- 2020/2021 Brazilian Superliga, with Praia Clube
- 2021/2022 Hellenic Championship, with Olympiacos Piraeus

=== National trophies ===
- 2016 Swiss Super Cup, with Volero Zürich
- 2017 Swiss Cup, with Volero Zürich
- 2018 Brazilian Cup, with Osasco Sao Paolo
- 2018 Brazilian Super Cup, with Osasco Sao Paolo
- 2020 Brazilian Super Cup, with Praia Clube
- 2021 Brazilian Cup, with Praia Clube

=== Individuals ===
- 2011 Summer Universiade: Best server
- 2018/2019 Brazilian Superliga: Best server
- 2023 Brazilian Cup: Best server
