= Yevgeniya Nyukhalova =

Ukrainian volleyball player (born 1995)

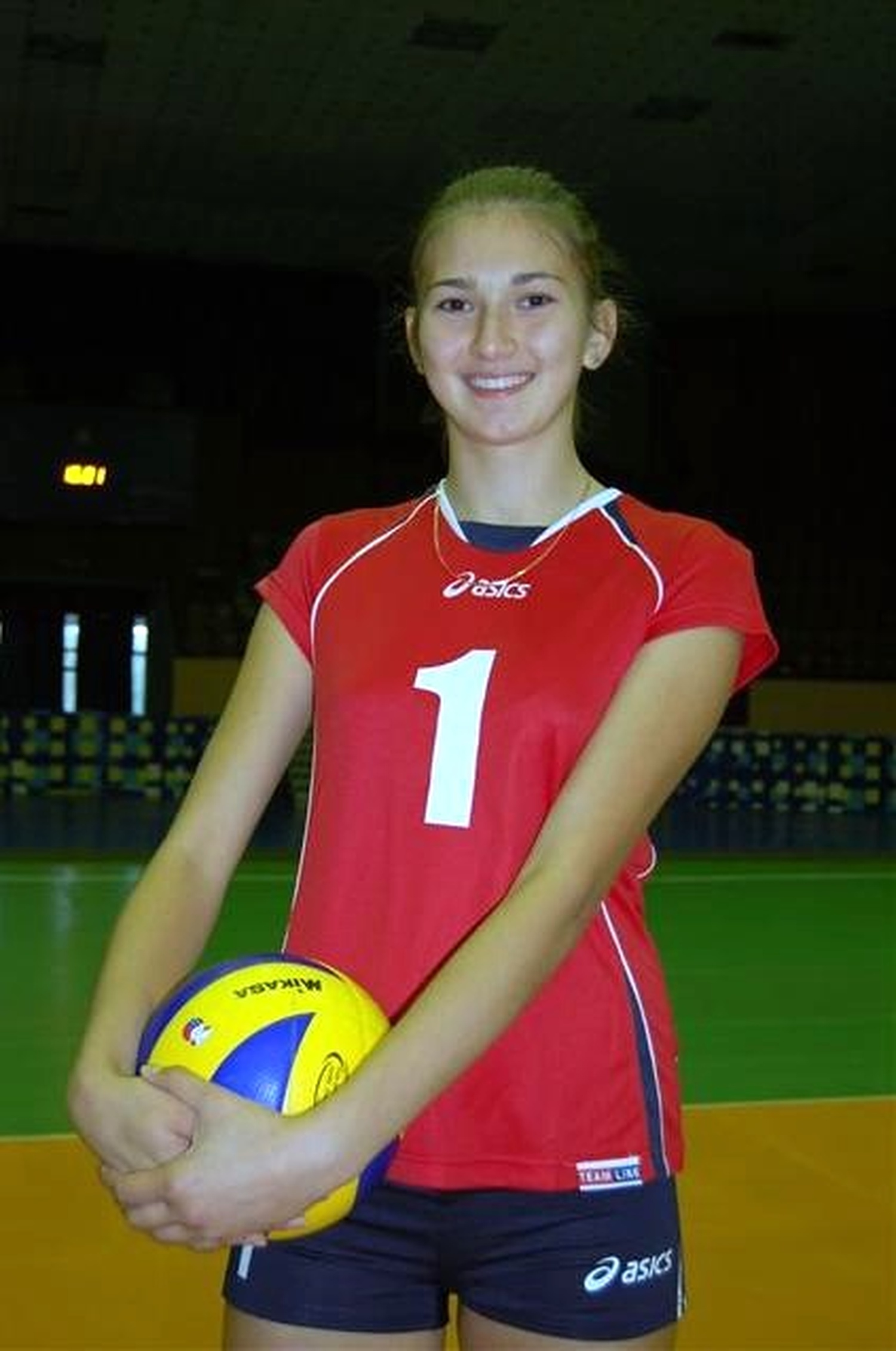

Personal information
- Nationality: Ukrainian
- Born: 25 May 1995 (age 31)
- Height: 193 cm (6 ft 4 in)
- Weight: 79 kg (174 lb)
- Spike: 310 cm (122 in)
- Block: 296 cm (117 in)

Volleyball information
- Position: Opposite spiker

Career
- Years: Team
- 2013-2014: Voléro Zürich

Yevgeniya Nyukhalova (born 23 May 1995) is a Ukrainian female volleyball player.

With her club Voléro Zürich she competed at the 2015 FIVB Volleyball Women's Club World Championship.

She played for Thompson Rivers University.

== Clubs ==
Club	From	To
(Ukraine) VK Severodontchanka	2007-2008	2012-2013
(Switzerland) Voléro Zurich	2013-2014	2014-2015
(France) Entente Sportive Le Cannet-Rocheville	2015-2016	2015-2016
(Philippines) PSL-F2 Logistics Manila	August 2016	October 2016
(Ukraine) VK Severodontchanka	2016-2017	2016-2017
(Finland) LP Kangasala	January 2017	…
