= Rika Nomoto =

Japanese volleyball player (born 1991)

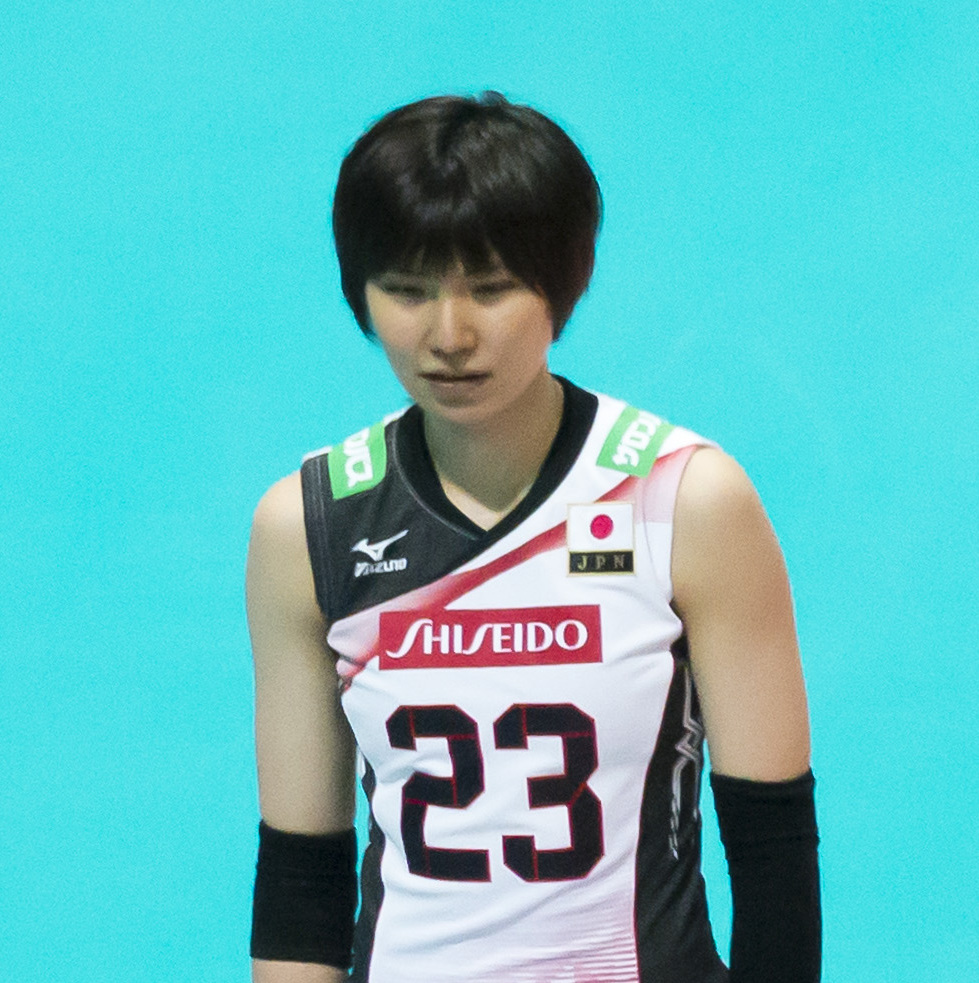
- Nomoto in 2017

Personal information
- Nationality: Japanese
- Born: 21 September 1991 (age 35)
- Height: 1.79 m (5 ft 10 in)
- Weight: 70 kg (154 lb)
- Spike: 310 cm (122 in)
- Block: 279 cm (110 in)

Volleyball information
- Number: 8

Career
Years	Teams
2014-2015	Hisamitsu Springs

National team
2010-2014	Japan

Rika Nomoto (born 21 September 1991) is a Japanese volleyball player. She is part of the Japan women's national volleyball team. She competed at the 2017 FIVB Volleyball Women's World Grand Champions Cup, and the 2017 FIVB Volleyball World Grand Prix.

With her club Hisamitsu Springs she competed at the 2014 and 2015 FIVB Volleyball Women's Club World Championship.
