= Laura Unternährer =

Swiss volleyball player (born 1993)

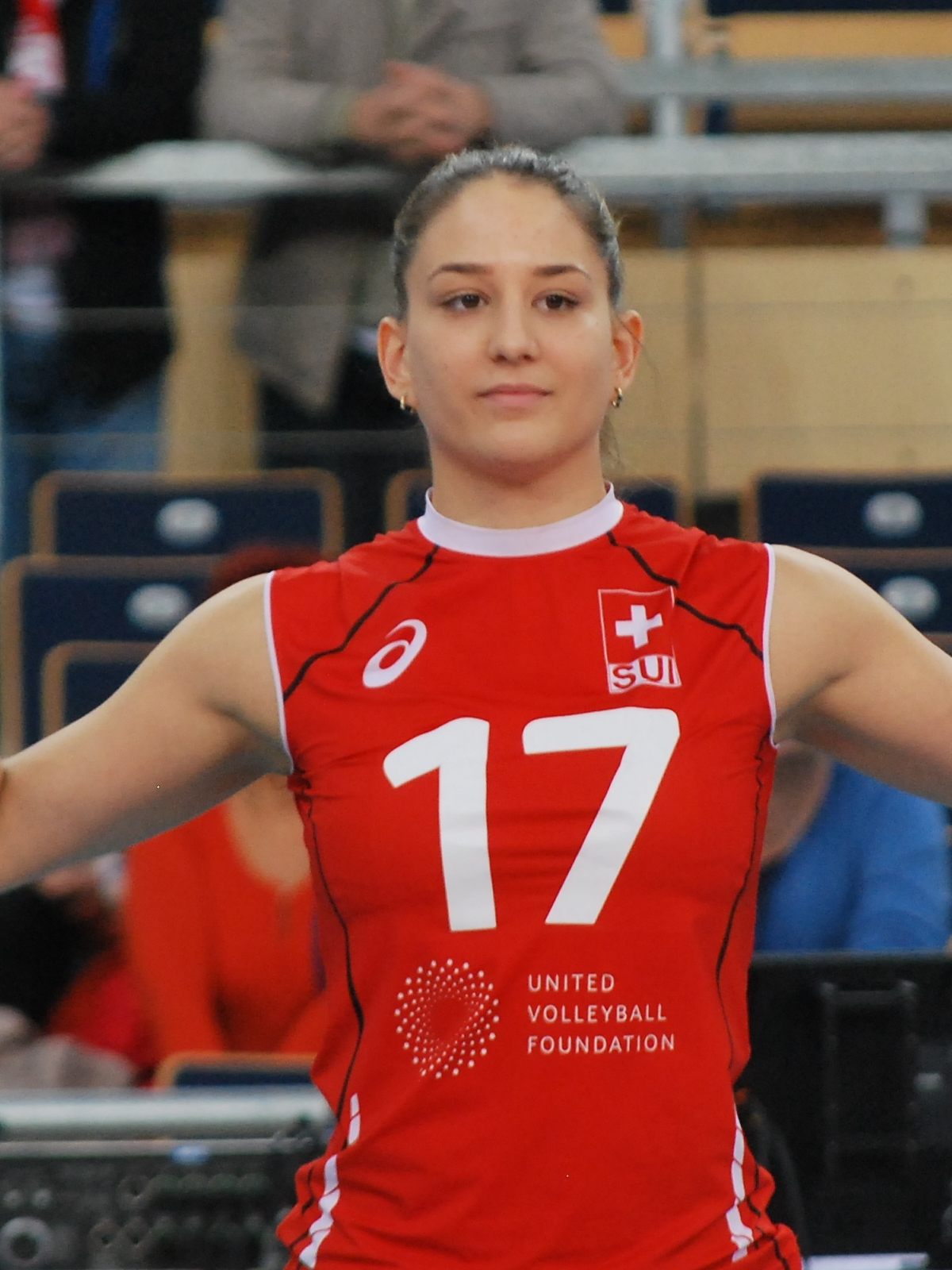
- Unternährer in 2014

Personal information
- Nationality: Swiss
- Born: 11 July 1993 (age 33)
- Height: 1.79 m (5 ft 10 in)
- Weight: 70 kg (154 lb)
- Spike: 303 cm (119 in)
- Block: 283 cm (111 in)

Volleyball information
- Number: 2

Career
Years	Teams
2013-2015	Voléro Zürich

Laura Unternährer (born 11 July 1993) is a Swiss female volleyball player. With her club Voléro Zürich she competed at the 2013, 2014 and 2015 FIVB Volleyball Women's Club World Championship.
