= Swiss Women's Volleyball Cup =

Volleyball in Switzerland

- Sport: Volleyball
- Founded: 1962
- Administrator: Swiss Volley
- Country: Switzerland
- Continent: Europe
- Most recent champion: Volero Zürich (14th titles)
- Most titles: Universität Basel (17 Titles)
- Website: https://www.volleyball.ch/

The Swiss Women's Volleyball Cup is an annual women's volleyball club competition held every year in Switzerland since the year 1962, only three editions were canceled in 1963/64, 1966 and the 2020, the Universität Basel has dominated this competition from the early 60s to the 80s achieving 17 Titles record and then comes Volero Zürich in the 2000s who completes this dominance with 14 titles of whom 9 consecutive between 2010 and 2018

== Winners list ==
Years	Winners	Score	Runners-up
1962	VBC Biel-Bienne		
1963-64	Competition Not Disputed		
1965	Uni Basel		
1966	Competition Not Disputed		
1967	Uni Basel		
1968	Uni Basel		
1969	Uni Basel		
1970	Uni Basel		
1971	VBC Biel-Bienne		
1972	Uni Basel		
1973	Uni Basel		
1974	Uni Basel	-	-
1975	Uni Basel	-	-
1976	Uni Basel	-	-
1977	Uni Basel	3 - 0 (15–11, 15–7, 15–8)	VBC Biel-Bienne
1978	Uni Basel	3 - 1 (15–4, 10–15, 15–13, 15–6)	Spada Academica
1979	Lausanne VBC	3 - 1 (?)	Uni Basel
1980	Uni Basel	3 - 1 (?)	Neuchâtel Sport
1981	Lausanne UC	3 - 1 (15–11, 15–13, 5–15, 16–14)	Uni Basel
1982	Uni Basel	3 - 2 (15–11, 11–15, 13–15, 15–9, 15–13)	Lausanne UC
1983	Uni Basel	3 - 0 (?)	Lausanne UC
1984	Lausanne UC	3 - 0 (15–12, 15–8, 15–9)	BTV Luzern
1985	Uni Basel	3 - 1 (12–15, 15–11, 15–8, 17–15)	Lausanne UC
1986	Lausanne UC	3 - 1 (15–11, 15–11, 15–17, 16–14)	Uni Basel
1987	Lausanne UC	3 - 2 (15–11, 9–15, 6–15, 19–17, 15–13)	VBC Montana Luzern
1988	Uni Basel	3 - 1 (8–15, 15–12, 15–11, 15–11)	BTV Luzern
1989	VBC Montana Luzern	3 - 1 (?)	Uni Basel
1990	BTV Luzern	3 - 0 (15–8, 15–10, 15–7)	Genève Elite VB
1991	BTV Luzern	3 - 0 (15–3, 13–15, 15–7, 15–6)	VBC Montana Luzern
1992	BTV Luzern	3 - 0 (15–11, 15–3, 15–7)	Basler VB
1993	BTV Luzern	3 - 0 (15–10, 15–8, 15–13)	VBC Cheseaux
1994	RTV 1879 Basel	3 - 2 (15–17, 15–11, 15–9, 12–15, 15–10)	BTV Luzern
1995	RTV 1879 Basel	3 - 2 (10–15, 15–10, 12–15, 15–9, 15–13)	BTV Luzern
1996	RTV 1879 Basel	3 - 1 (15–11, 11–15, 15–8, 15–11)	BTV Luzern
1997	BTV Luzern	3 - 1 (18–15, 15–9, 15–9, 15–10)	RTV 1879 Basel
1998	BTV Luzern	3 - 1 (15–3, 10–15, 15–11, 15–10)	KSV Wattwil
1999	Zeiler Köniz	3 - 2 (11–15, 2–15, 15–9, 15–9, 15–8)	BTV Luzern
2000	VC Kanti Schaffhausen	3 - 1 (25–27, 25–21, 26–24, 25–22)	BTV Luzern
2001	Zeiler Köniz	3 - 0 (25–20, 25–18, 25–21)	VC Kanti Schaffhausen
2002	Zeiler Köniz	3 - 0 (25–16, 25–22, 25–22)	VC Kanti Schaffhausen
2003	BTV Luzern	3 - 1 (12–25, 25–17, 25–19, 25–20)	Zeiler Köniz
2004	Zeiler Köniz	3 - 0 (25–16, 25–23, 25–15)	VC Kanti Schaffhausen
2005	Volero Zürich	3 - 0 (25–17, 25–21, 25–23)	Volleyball Franches-Montagnes
2006	Volero Zürich	3 - 0 (25–15, 25–10, 25–14)	Smaesch Pfeffingen
2007	Volero Zürich	3 - 0 (25–21, 25–10, 25–20)	Zeiler Köniz
2008	Volero Zürich	3 - 1 (22–25, 25–17, 25–5, 25–16)	Smaesch Pfeffingen
2009	VC Kanti Schaffhausen	3 - 0 (25–14, 25–19, 25–21)	Volley Bellinzona
2010	Volero Zürich	3 - 0 (25–14, 25–20, 26–24)	SAGRES NUC
2011	Volero Zürich	3 - 0 (25–14, 25–20, 26–24)	SAGRES NUC
2012	Volero Zürich	3 - 0 (25–18, 26–24, 25–18)	Hôtel Cristal VFM
2013	Volero Zürich	3 - 0 (25–19, 25–13, 25–18)	Volley Köniz
2014	Volero Zürich	3 - 0 (25–18, 25–13, 25–11)	SAGRES NUC
2015	Volero Zürich	3 - 0 (25–13, 25–19, 25–12)	TS Volley Düdingen
2016	Volero Zürich	3 - 0 (25–17, 25–15, 25–20)	TS Volley Düdingen
2017	Volero Zürich	3 - 0 (25–18, 25–19, 25–22)	Smaesch Pfeffingen
2018	Volero Zürich	3 - 0 (25–18, 25–16, 25–20)	Viteos NUC
2019	Viteos NUC	3 - 1 (20–25, 25–19, 25–19, 25–20)	Smaesch Pfeffingen
2020	Competition Stopped		
2021	VC Kanti Schaffhouse	3 - 2 (25–23, 22-25,25-23, 13-25, 15-13)	Viteos NUC
2022	Volero Zürich	3 - 2 (25–15, 25-19, 22–25, 18-25, 20-18)	TSV Volley Dudingen
2023	Viteos NUC	3 - 2 (22-25, 14-25, 25–16, 25–20, 15-7)	Volley Lugano
2024	Viteos NUC	3 - 0 (25-20, 25-10, 25–19)	Volley Lugano
2025	Viteos NUC	3 - 0 (25-16, 25-22, 25–18)	Sm'Aesch Pfeffingen

== Honours by club ==
Rk	Club	Titles	City	Years won
1	Universität Basel	17	Basel	1965, (1967–1970), (1972–1978), 1980, (1982–1983), 1985, 1988
2	Volero Zürich	14	Zürich	(2005–2008), (2010–2018), 2022
3	BTV Luzern	7	Lucerne	(1990–1993), (1997–1998), 2003
4	Lausanne UC	5	Lausanne	1979, 1981, 1984, (1986–1987)
=	Volley Köniz	4	Köniz	1999, (2001–2002), 2004
6	RTV 1879 Basel	3	Basel	(1994–1996)
7	VBC Biel-Bienne	2	Bienne	1962, 1971
=	Kanti Schaffhausen	2	Schaffhouse	2000, 2009
9	VBC Montana Luzern	1	Lucerne	1989
=	NUC Volleyball	1	Neuchâtel	2019
