= Julie Lengweiler =

Swiss volleyball player

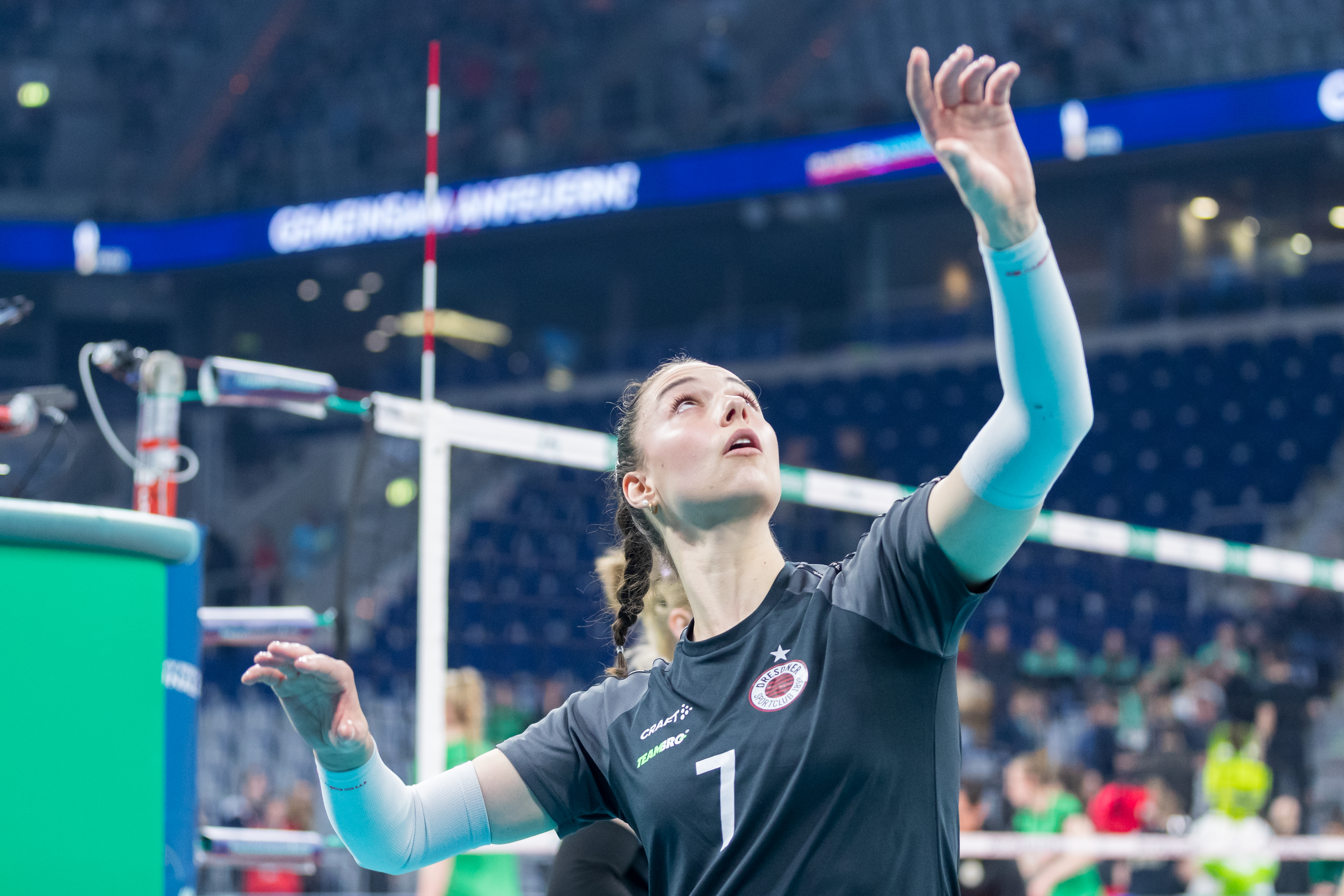

Personal information
- Nationality: Swiss
- Born: 6 November 1998 (age 27)
- Height: 1.88 m (6 ft 2 in)
- Weight: 69 kg (152 lb)
- Spike: 305 cm (120 in)
- Block: 300 cm (120 in)

Volleyball information
- Position: Wing spiker
- Current club: (Switzerland) Volero Zürich
- Number: 12
Honours
Women's volleyball
Representing Switzerland

Julie Lengweiler (born 6 November 1998) is a Swiss volleyball player. She is a member of the Women's National Team. She participated at the 2016 FIVB Volleyball Women's Club World Championship, and 2017 Montreux Volley Masters.

== Clubs ==
- (Switzerland) Volero Zürich (2017–)
