= Swiss Women's Volleyball League =

Swiss Women's Volleyball National League A
- Current season, competition or edition: 2019–20 Swiss Women's Volleyball League A
- Sport: Volleyball
- Founded: 1958
- First season: 1958/59
- Administrator: Swiss Volley
- No. of teams: 10 (2019–20)
- Country: Switzerland
- Continent: Europe
- Level on pyramid: 1
- Relegation to: 2nd League
- Domestic cups: Swiss Cup; Swiss Super Cup
- International cups: CEV Champions League; CEV Cup; CEV Challenge Cup
- Website: http://www.volleyball.ch/

The Swiss Women Volleyball League is an annual competition of women's volleyball teams in Switzerland. It has been held since 1958. Managed and organized by the Swiss Volley.

It is the country's premier league for women’s volleyball.

== History ==
In the 2018/19 season in League A 8 teams had participated: "Dudingen, Pfeffingen, Canty (Schaffhausen), Vitéos NUC (Neuchâtel), Lugano, Franches-Montagne (Senlege), Geneva, Chaesaux. The championship title was won by "Viteyos NUK", who won the final series by beating "Pfeffingen" 3-1 (1:3, 3:1, 3:0, 3:0). The 3rd place went to Dudingen.

== Winners list ==
Years	(gold) Gold
1959	FC Lucerne
1960	Servette VB
1961	VBC Biel-Bienne
1962	VBC Biel-Bienne
1963	VBC Biel-Bienne
1964	Universität Basel
1965	Universität Basel
1966	Universität Basel
1967	Universität Basel
1968	Universität Basel
1969	Universität Basel
1970	Universität Basel
1971	Universität Basel
1972	Universität Basel
1973	Universität Basel
1974	Universität Basel
1975	Universität Basel
1976	Universität Basel
1977	Universität Basel
1978	Universität Basel
1979	Universität Basel
1980	Universität Basel
1981	Universität Basel

Years	(gold) Gold
1982	Universität Basel
1983	BTV Lucerne
1984	Lausanne UC
1985	Lausanne UC
1986	Universität Basel
1987	Universität Basel
1988	Universität Basel
1989	VBC Montana Lucerne
1990	VBC Montana Lucerne
1991	BTV Lucerne
1992	BTV Lucerne
1993	BTV Lucerne
1994	BTV Lucerne
1995	RTV 1879 Basel
1996	RTV 1879 Basel
1997	BTV Lucerne
1998	BTV Lucerne
1999	KSV Wattwil
2000	Zeiler Köniz
2001	Zeiler Köniz
2002	Zeiler Köniz
2003	Zeiler Köniz
2004	Zeiler Köniz

Years	(gold) Gold
2005	VBC Voléro Zurich
2006	VBC Voléro Zurich
2007	VBC Voléro Zurich
2008	VBC Voléro Zurich
2009	Zeiler Köniz
2010	VBC Voléro Zurich
2011	VBC Voléro Zurich
2012	VBC Voléro Zurich
2013	VBC Voléro Zurich
2014	VBC Voléro Zurich
2015	VBC Voléro Zurich
2016	VBC Voléro Zurich
2017	VBC Voléro Zurich
2018	VBC Voléro Zurich
2019	Viteos NUC
2020	Suspended
2021	Viteos NUC
2022	Viteos NUC

== Titles by club ==
rk.	Club.	Titles.	City.	Years won.
1	Universität Basel	22	Basel	(1964—1982), (1986—1988)
2	VBC Voléro Zurich	13	Zürich	(2005—2008), (2010—2018)
3	BTV Lucerne	7	Lucerne	1983, (1991—1994), (1997—1998)
4	Volley Köniz	6	Köniz	(2000—2004), 2009
5	VBC Biel-Bienne	3	Bienne	(1961—1963)
=	NUC Volleyball	3	Neuchâtel	2019 (2021–2022)
7	Lausanne UC	2	Lausanne	(1984—1985)
=	VBC Montana Lucerne	2	Lucerne	(1989—1990)
=	RTV 1879 Basel	2	Basel	(1995—1996)
10	FC Lucerne	1	Lucerne	1959
=	Servette VB	1	Geneva	1960
=	KSV Wattwil	1	Wattwil	1999
