= Jordan Larson =

American volleyball player (born 1986)

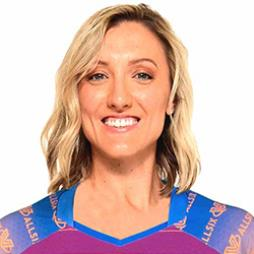
- Larson in 2022

Personal information
- Full name: Jordan Quinn Larson
- Nickname: Governor
- Born: October 16, 1986 (age 40) Fremont, Nebraska, U.S.
- Home town: Hooper, Nebraska, U.S.
- Education: University of Nebraska
- Height: 6 ft 2 in (1.88 m)
- Weight: 165 lb (75 kg)
- Spike: 119 in (302 cm)
- Block: 116 in (295 cm)

Volleyball information
- Position: Outside hitter
- Current club: (United States) LOVB Nebraska

Career
- Years: Team
- 2009 2009–2014 2014–2019 2019–2022 2021 2022 2024–present: (Puerto Rico) Vaqueras de Bayamón (Russia) Dynamo Kazan (Turkey) Eczacıbaşı VitrA (China) Shanghai (United States) Athletes Unlimited Pro Volleyball (Italy) Vero Volley Monza (United States) LOVB Nebraska

National team
- Years: Team
- 2009–2024: United States
Medal record
Women's volleyball
Representing the United States
Olympic Games
Gold medal – first place	2020 Tokyo	Team
Silver medal – second place	2012 London	Team
Silver medal – second place	2024 Paris	Team
Bronze medal – third place	2016 Rio de Janeiro	Team
World Championship
Gold medal – first place	2014 Italy	Team
World Cup
Silver medal – second place	2011 Japan	Team
Silver medal – second place	2019 Japan	Team
Bronze medal – third place	2015 Japan	Team
World Grand Champions Cup
Silver medal – second place	2013 Japan	Team
Bronze medal – third place	2017 Japan	Team
World Grand Prix
Gold medal – first place	2010 Ningbo	Team
Gold medal – first place	2011 Macau	Team
Gold medal – first place	2015 Omaha	Team
Silver medal – second place	2016 Bangkok	Team
FIVB Nations League
Gold medal – first place	2018 Nanjing	Team
Gold medal – first place	2019 Nanjing	Team
Gold medal – first place	2021 Rimini	Team

Jordan Quinn Larson (born October 16, 1986) is an American professional volleyball player who plays as an outside hitter for the United States women's national volleyball team. A four-time Olympian, Larson earned the USA its first-ever gold in women's volleyball at the 2020 Summer Olympics. She also has two silver medals from the 2012 and 2024 Summer Olympics and a bronze medal from the 2016 Summer Olympics.

With a career spanning more than 15 years, Larson is considered one of the best players in the history of USA volleyball.

== Early life ==
Larson was born in Fremont, Nebraska to Kae and Kevin Larson. Her parents separated when she was three years old, and she and her mother subsequently moved to Hooper to move in with her stepfather, Pat Clough. She began playing volleyball in eighth grade. She was named to the Super-State first team in her last three seasons. In 2003, she had 15.08 kills per game to set a Class C1 state record and led Logan View High School to the state finals. In 2004, as a senior, she set a C1 record with 501 kills, and Logan View made it to the Class C1 state semifinals. She was named Nebraska Gatorade High School Player of the Year.

Larson played for the Nebraska Juniors at the USA Junior Olympic Girls' Volleyball Championship in 2003, 2004, and 2005. She was selected as an All-American all three years.

When Larson was in high school, her mother was diagnosed with breast cancer. She died seven years later in 2009.

== College career ==
Larson started her college volleyball career at the University of Nebraska in 2005. That year, she was named the American Volleyball Coaches Association Central Region Freshman of the Year and the Big 12 Conference Freshman of the Year. She also helped the Huskers finish second in the NCAA Women's Volleyball Championship. In 2006, she led the Huskers to the national title and was named to the AVCA All-America First Team. In 2007, she made the AVCA All-America Third Team. In 2008, as a senior, she was named to the AVCA All-America First Team. She was also chosen as the Big 12 Player of the Year and the league's defensive player of the year; it was the first time that a player achieved both in the same year. Over her four-year college career, Larson had a total of 1,600 kills and 1,410 digs.

== Professional career ==
Larson has played extensively for various clubs in Europe and North America. She began her professional career in Puerto Rico before joining Russian team Dinamo Kazan. With Dinamo Kazan, she won gold at the 2014 FIVB Volleyball Women's Club World Championship and the 2014 CEV Champions League.

Larson joined Eczacibasi in Turkey and played with the team until 2019. While with Eczacibasi, she won the 2015 and 2016 World Championships and earned bronze in 2018. Larson was named MVP of both the continental and world competitions in 2015.

From 2019 to 2022 she played for Shanghai in China. In 2021, she played in the inaugural Athletes Unlimited Pro Volleyball season, where she became the first-ever champion. In 2022, she played for Vero Volley Monza.

Larson is a founding athlete for League One Volleyball (LOVB)'s inaugural Nebraska team based in Omaha, which launched in November 2024.

== National team career ==
Larson joined the United States women's national team in 2009. With the team, she has earned medals at several major international competitions, including gold medals at the FIVB World Grand Prix (2010, 2011, and 2015), the FIVB World Championship (2014), and the FIVB Volleyball Nations League (2018, 2019, 2021). She became the team's captain in 2017.

At the 2012 Summer Olympics in London, Larson earned a silver medal with the United States. The team, which was ranked number one in the world going into the competition, was undefeated in pool play, but fell to Brazil in the gold medal match.

Larson played with the United States at the 2016 Summer Olympics in Rio de Janeiro. The team was once again undefeated in pool play, but lost to Serbia in the semi-finals. In the bronze medal match against the Netherlands, Larson led the team to victory with 13 kills.

On June 7, 2021, U.S. National Team head coach Karch Kiraly announced Larson would be part of the 12-player Olympic roster for the 2020 Summer Olympics in Tokyo, making her the fifth oldest volleyball player in U.S. history to be named to an Olympics roster. The team went on to win America's first-ever women's Olympic volleyball gold medal, with Larson scoring the final point in a straight-sets victory over Brazil in the gold medal match.

Though Larson had intended for 2020 to be her last Olympics, she came out of retirement in the spring of 2023 and was named to the roster for the 2024 Summer Olympics in Paris.

=== Coaching career ===
Larson joined her alma mater, the University of Nebraska, as an Assistant Coach in June 2023.

== Personal life ==
Larson graduated from the University of Nebraska in 2008 with a degree in communication studies. She has been married twice, first from 2009 to 2015 to Luke Burbach, and then from 2021 to 2023 to Pepperdine men's volleyball coach David Hunt.

== Awards ==
=== Individual ===
- 2011–12 CEV Champions League "Best receiver"
- 2013 NORCECA Championship "Best server"
- 2013–14 CEV Champions League "Best blocker"
- 2014–15 CEV Champions League "Most valuable player"
- 2015 FIVB Club World Championship "Most valuable player"
- 2017 FIVB World Grand Champions Cup "Best outside spiker"
- 2020 Summer Olympics – "Most valuable player"
- 2020 Summer Olympics – "Best outside hitter"

=== Clubs ===
- 2011–12 CEV Champions League – Bronze medal, with Dinamo Kazan
- 2013–14 CEV Champions League – Champion, with Dinamo Kazan
- 2014 FIVB Club World Championship – Champion, with Dinamo Kazan
- 2014–15 CEV Champions League – Champion, with Eczacıbaşı VitrA
- 2015 FIVB Club World Championship – Champion, with Eczacibasi VitrA
- 2016 FIVB Club World Championship – Champion, with Eczacibasi VitrA
- 2016–17 CEV Champions League – Bronze medal, with Eczacıbaşı VitrA

=== College ===
- Two-time First Team AVCA All-American (2006, 2008)
- Third Team AVCA All-American (2007)
- Two-time NCAA Championship All-Tournament Team (2006, 2008)
- Two-time NCAA Regional All-Tournament Team (2006, 2008)
- Three-time First Team AVCA All-Central Region (2006, 2007, 2008)
- 2005 AVCA Central Region Freshman of the Year
- AVCA National Player of the Week (September 23, 2008)
- Three-time First Team All-Big 12 (2006, 2007, 2008)
- 2008 Big 12 Player of the Year
- Two-time Big 12 Defensive Player of the Year (2006, 2008)
- 2005 Big 12 Freshman of the Year
- Two-time Big 12 Player of the Week
- Three-time First Team Academic All-Big 12 (2006, 2007, 2008)

=== National team ===
- 2010 Pan-American Volleyball Cup
- 2010 FIVB World Grand Prix
- 2011 Pan-American Volleyball Cup
- 2011 Women's NORCECA Volleyball Continental Championship
- 2011 FIVB World Grand Prix
- 2011 FIVB Women's World Cup
- 2012 FIVB World Grand Prix
- 2012 Summer Olympics
- 2013 FIVB World Grand Champions Cup
- 2013 Women's NORCECA Volleyball Continental Championship
- 2014 FIVB World Championship
- 2015 FIVB World Grand Prix
- 2015 FIVB Women's World Cup
- 2015 Women's NORCECA Volleyball Continental Championship
- 2016 Women's NORCECA Olympic Qualification Tournament
- 2016 FIVB World Grand Prix
- 2016 Summer Olympics
- 2017 FIVB World Grand Champions Cup
- 2018 FIVB Volleyball Women's Nations League
- 2019 FIVB Volleyball Women's Nations League
- 2019 FIVB Women's Volleyball Intercontinental Olympic Qualifications Tournament (IOQT) - Qualified
- 2019 FIVB Women's World Cup
- 2019 Women's NORCECA Volleyball Continental Championship
- 2021 FIVB Volleyball Women's Nations League
- 2021 2020 Summer Olympics
- 2024 2024 Summer Olympics
