= Olesia Rykhliuk =

Ukrainian volleyball player

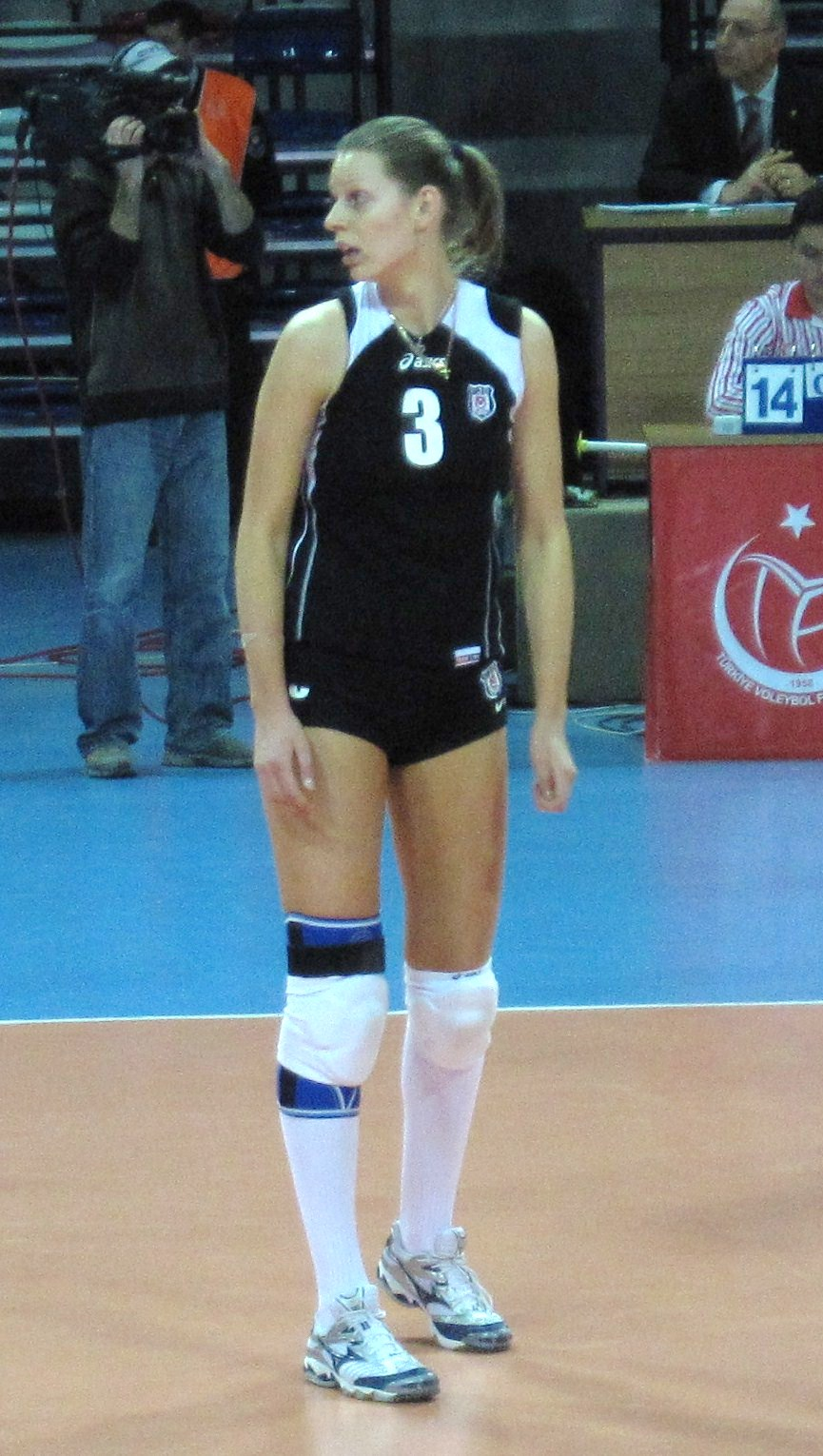

Personal information
- Nationality: Ukrainian
- Born: 11 December 1987 (age 38); Kyiv, Ukrainian SSR
- Height: 1.96 m (6 ft 5 in)
- Weight: 83 kg (183 lb)
- Spike: 315 cm (124 in)
- Block: 305 cm (120 in)

Volleyball information
- Position: Opposite
- Current club: Çukurova Adana Demir Spor Klübü
- Number: 7

Career
Years
- 2002–2010
- 2010–2011
- 2011
- 2011–2013
- 2013–2017
- 2017–2019
- 2019–2021
- 2021–2022
- 2022–
Teams
- Jinestra Odesa
- Sirio Perugia
- Beşiktaş
- IBK Altos
- Volero Zürich
- Beşiktaş
- Galatasaray HDI Sigorta
- Kuzeyboru Spor Klübü
Çukurova Adana Demir Spor Klübü

Olesia Rykhliuk (born 11 December 1987) is a Ukrainian volleyball player.

She competed at five FIVB World Club Championships. At 2015 Club World Championship in Zürich, Switzerland, won a bronze medal with Volero Zürich and received Best Opposite award and was a Best Scorer of the tournament. Also became a bronze medalist in 2017 Club World Championship in Kobe, Japan with Volero Zürich club.

In season 2020/2021 won silver medal at CEV Cup with Galatasaray from Istanbul

== Career ==
Alesia Rykhliuk won the bronze medal at the 2015 FIVB Club World Championship, playing with the Swiss club Voléro Zürich. She also won the tournament's Best Opposite award. She led the competition with 93 points, breaking Ekaterina Gamova's previous record of 85 points. Second time became bronze medalist of FIVB Club World Championship in 2017 with Volero Zürich.

In season 2020/2021 won silver medal at CEV Cup with Galatasaray HDI Sigorta from Istanbul.

== Awards ==
=== Individuals ===
- 2015 Club World Championship "Best Opposite"
- 2015 Club World Championship "Best Scorer"
- 2016 Club World Championship "Best Server"
- 2017/2018 Best Scorer of Turkish Women’s Volleyball League
- 2015/2016 MVP Swiss League
- 2014/2015 MVP Swiss League
- 2013/2014 MVP Swiss League
- 2013/2014 MVP Swiss Cup
- 2014 Best Score of Top Volley Basel
- 2012/2013 MVP Korean V-League League
- 2012/2013 Best Spiker of Korean V-League
- 2011/2012 MVP All-Star Game Korean V-League

=== Clubs ===
- 2015 FIVB Club World Championship - Bronze medal, with Voléro Zürich
- 2017 FIVB Club World Championship - Bronze medal, with Voléro Zürich
- 2020/2021 CEV Cup - Silver medal, with Galatasaray HDI Sigorta
