= Ekaterina Orlova (volleyball) =

Russian volleyball player (born 1987)

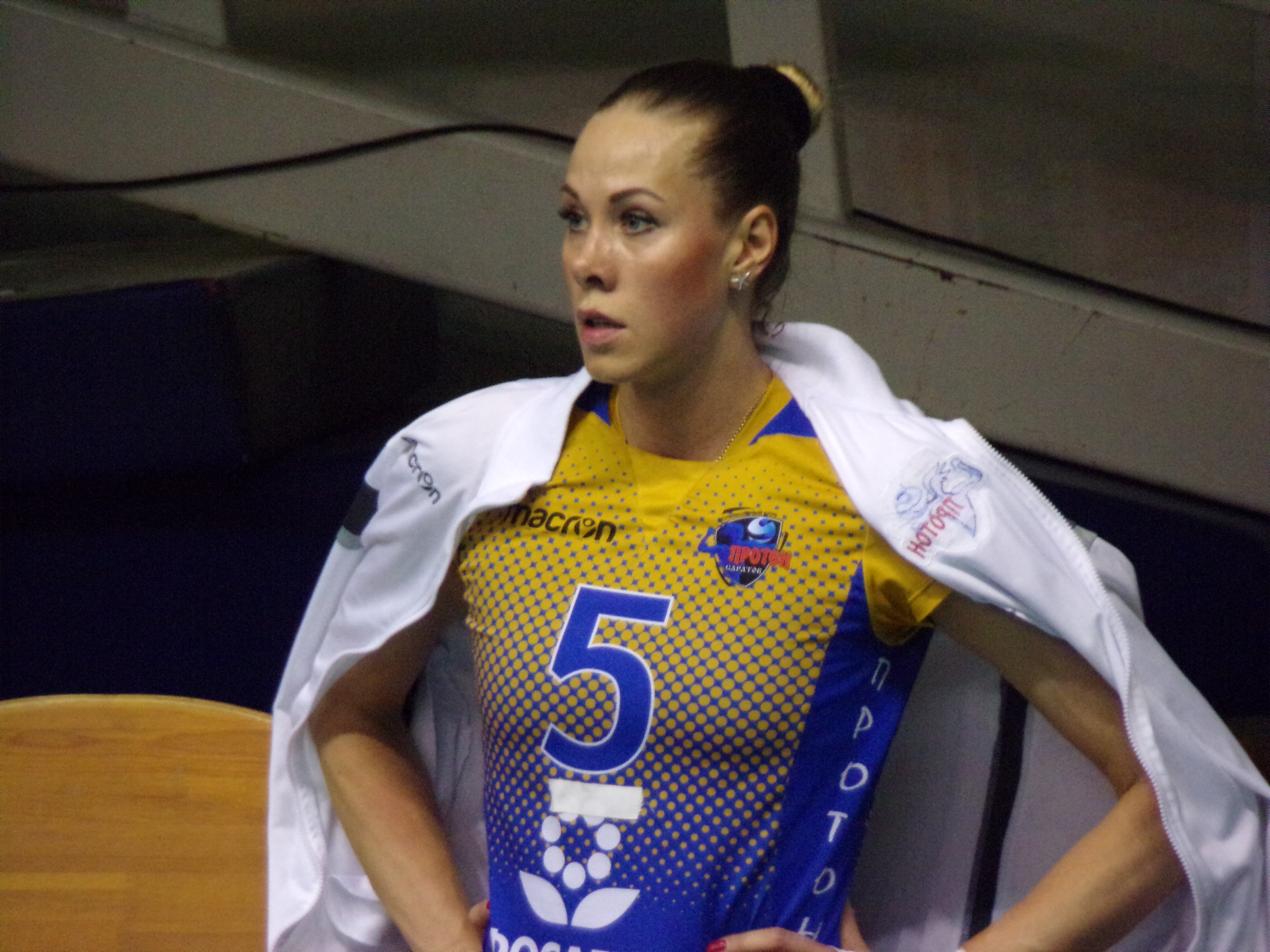
- Orlova in 2018

Personal information
- Nationality: Russian
- Born: 21 October 1987 (age 39)
- Height: 193 cm (6 ft 4 in)
- Weight: 77 kg (170 lb)
- Spike: 307 cm (121 in)
- Block: 301 cm (119 in)

Volleyball information
- Position: Middle Blocker
- Current club: VK Lokomotiv Kaliningrad
- Number: 15

Career
| Years | Teams |
|---|---|
| 2011-2015 | (Russia) VK Omichka |
| 2015-2017 | (Switzerland) Volero Zurich |
| 2017-2018 | (Russia) VC Proton Saratov |
| 2018-2019 | (Russia) VK Lokomotiv Kaliningrad |

National team
| 2015-2019 | Russia |

Ekaterina Orlova (born 21 October 1987) is a former Russian female volleyball player, playing as a middle-blocker. She was part of the Russia women's national volleyball team.

She participated in the 2015 FIVB Volleyball World Grand Prix. She won the gold medal at the 2015 Women's European Volleyball Championship. On club level she plays for Volero Zurich, in Switzerland.
