= Neslihan Demir =

Turkish retired volleyball player

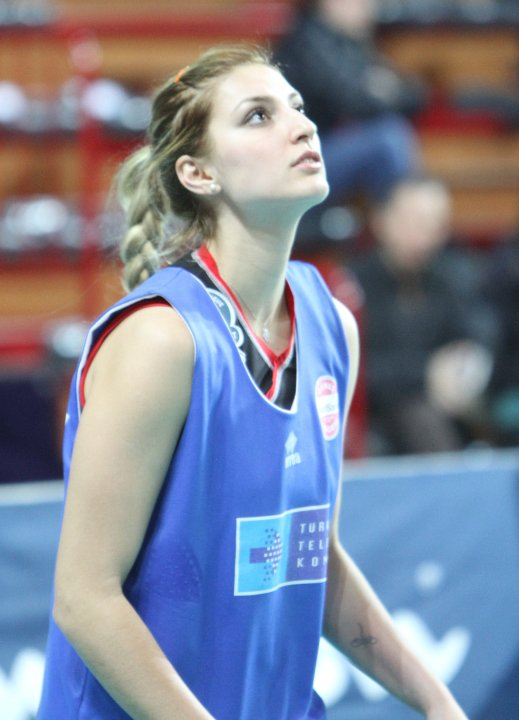

Personal information
- Full name: Neslihan Demir Güler
- Nickname: The Iron Lady
- Nationality: Turkish
- Born: 9 December 1983 (age 42); Eskişehir, Turkey
- Hometown: Eskişehir, Turkey
- Height: 1.87 m (6 ft 2 in)
- Weight: 72 kg (159 lb)
- Spike: 315 cm (124 in)
- Block: 306 cm (120 in)

Volleyball information
- Position: Opposite/Outside Hitter
- Number: 17

Career
Years	Teams
1998–2002; 2002–2006; 2006–2008; 2008–2010; 2010–2017; 2017–2018	Yeşilyurt; VakıfBank Güneş Sigorta; CV Tenerife; VakıfBank Güneş Sigorta; Eczacıbaşı VitrA; Galatasaray

National team
1997–2016	Turkey
Medal record
Women's volleyball
Representing Turkey
World Grand Prix
Bronze medal – third place	2012 Ningbo	Team
European Championships
Silver medal – second place	2003 Turkey	Team
Bronze medal – third place	2011 Italy/Serbia	Team
European League
Silver medal – second place	2009 Kayseri	Team
Silver medal – second place	2011 Istanbul	Team
Bronze medal – third place	2010 Ankara	Team
Mediterranean Games
Gold medal – first place	2005 Almeria	Team
Silver medal – second place	2009 Pescara	Team
Silver medal – second place	2013 Mersin	Team

Neslihan Demir (born 9 December 1983) is a retired Turkish volleyball star. She is one of the most successful athletes of Turkey and has been among FIVB Heroes. She represented her country as the flag bearer at the 2012 Summer Olympics and the official advertisement face of Turkey for the 2020 Summer Olympics candidateship along with basketballer Hedo Türkoğlu. She was a left-handed opposite hitter and won numerous individual awards in the international tournaments. She studied at Gazi University.

== Career ==
Neslihan Demir started playing volleyball at Eskişehir DSİ Bentspor in 1995. She played for Yeşilyurt, VakıfBank Güneş Sigorta, Spar Tenerife Marichal, Eczacıbaşı and Galatasaray during her career. She played hundreds of times for Turkish national team at all age levels.

At age 19, Demir was the leading player in the Turkish team that won silver medal at the 2003 European Championship in Turkey, making her a star in her home country and in the volleyball scene. Her popularity increased immensely during 2003 World Cup where she was 2nd in Best Scorer and Best Server rankings. Owing to her powerful spikes and serves, she was nicknamed as Demir Leydi (The Iron Lady) which is a reference to her family name Demir.

Playing with VakıfBank Güneş Sigorta she won CEV Top Teams Cup and was named as MVP in 2004. Later, she was awarded Best Scorer in CEV Champions League in 2006. While playing for Tenerife, Demir took a break from volleyball to become a mother in the 2007–08 season.

She was awarded Best Scorer at the 2006 World Championship and 2010 World Championship consecutively. She is the first and only volleyball player to achieve this feat.

Demir won two FIVB Club World Championship and a CEV Champions League championships with Eczacıbaşı. She won the Best Spiker award at the 2013-14 CEV Champions League.

Demir was awarded Sportsperson of the Year by Milliyet in 2006 and Volleyball Player of the Year by Sabah in 2003 and 2004. At the 2012 Summer Olympics, she was chosen to be the flagbearer of her home country. She was named The Ultimate Volleyball Team Leader and honoured with Lifetime Achievement Award at CEV European Volleyball Gala ceremonies in 2014 and 2019 respectively.

Demir was selected as FIVB Hero by FIVB in 2012. She was also selected for Roster 100 by FIVB as one of the 100 most influential volleyball players between 2010 and 2020, being one of the eight female opposite hitters in the selection.

== Personal life ==
Neslihan Demir married Orkun Darnel, captain of the Galatasaray Swimming team, on 16 July 2006. The couple have a daughter named Zeynep Penelope. Orkun Darnel became manager of Galatasaray Daikin women's volleyball team later. The couple announced their divorce in March 2013. Demir has been married to actor Kamil Güler since 17 June 2014. After retiring from professional volleyball, she worked as a consultant in the Turkish Volleyball Federation. She took up the position of General Manager at her former club Vakıfbank from 2020 to 2023.

== Clubs ==
- (Turkey) Eskişehir DSİ Bentspor (1995-1998)
- (Turkey) Yeşilyurt (1998-2002)
- (Turkey) Vakıfbank Güneş Sigorta (2002-2006)
- (Spain) Spar Tenerife Marichal (2006-2008)
- (Turkey) Vakıfbank Güneş Sigorta (2008-2010)
- (Turkey) Eczacıbaşı VitrA (2010-2017)
- (Turkey) Galatasaray (2017-2018)

== Awards ==
=== Individuals ===
- 2002-2003 Indesit Champions League "Best scorer"
- 2002-2003 Indesit Champions League "Best server"
- 2003-2004 Top Teams Cup Final Four "Most valuable player"
- 2003-2004 Top Teams Cup Final Four "Best server"
- 2005-2006 Indesit Champions League "Best server"
- 2005-2006 Indesit Champions League Final Four "Best scorer"
- 2006 World Championship "Best scorer"
- 2007 Montreux Volley Masters "Best scorer"
- 2007 Boris Yeltsin Cup "Most valuable player"
- 2008 FIVB World Grand Prix European Qualification "Best scorer"
- 2009 European Volleyball League "Most valuable player"
- 2009 European Volleyball League "Best scorer"
- 2009-2010 Indesit Champions League Preliminary Round "Best scorer"
- 2010 European Volleyball League "Best scorer"
- 2010 World Championship "Best scorer"
- 2011 FIVB World Grand Prix European Qualification "Best scorer"
- 2011 FIVB World Grand Prix European Qualification "Most valuable player"
- 2011 European Championship "Best scorer"
- 2012 FIVB World Grand Prix "Best server"
- 2013-14 CEV Champions League "Best spiker"

=== National team ===
- 2003 European Championship – Silver Medal
- 2005 Mediterranean Games – Gold Medal
- 2009 Mediterranean Games – Silver Medal
- 2009 European League – Silver Medal
- 2010 European League – Bronze Medal
- 2011 European League – Silver Medal
- 2011 European Championship – Bronze Medal
- 2012 FIVB World Grand Prix – Bronze Medal
- 2013 Mediterranean Games – Silver Medal

=== Clubs ===
- 2003-04 Turkish Championship – Champion, with Vakifbank Günes Sigorta Istanbul
- 2003-04 CEV Top Teams Cup – Champion, with Vakifbank Günes Sigorta Istanbul
- 2004-05 Turkish Championship – Champion, with Vakifbank Günes Sigorta Istanbul
- 2005-06 Turkish Championship – Runner-up, with Vakifbank Günes Sigorta Istanbul
- 2006-07 Spanish Championship – Runner-up, with Spar Tenerife Marichal
- 2006-2007 CEV Champions League – Bronze Medal with Spar Tenerife Marichal
- 2008 Spanish Super Cup – Champion, with Spar Tenerife Marichal
- 2009-2010 Turkish Championship – Runner-up, with Vakifbank Günes Sigorta Istanbul
- 2011 Turkish Cup – Champion, with Eczacıbaşı VitrA
- 2011 Turkish Super Cup – Champion, with Eczacıbaşı VitrA
- 2011-2012 Turkish Championship – Champion, with Eczacıbaşı VitrA
- 2012 Turkish Cup – Champion, with Eczacıbaşı VitrA
- 2012 Turkish Volleyball Super Cup – Champion, with Eczacıbaşı VitrA
- 2012-2013 Turkish Cup – Runner-up, with Eczacıbaşı VitrA
- 2012-2013 Turkish Women's Volleyball League – Runner-up, with Eczacıbaşı VitrA
- 2014-15 CEV Champions League – Champion, with Eczacıbaşı VitrA
- 2015 FIVB Volleyball Women's Club World Championship – Champion, with Eczacıbaşı VitrA
- 2016 FIVB Volleyball Women's Club World Championship – Champion, with Eczacıbaşı VitrA

== See also ==
- Turkish women in sports

Olympic Games
Preceded by Mehmet Özal	Flagbearer for Turkey; London 2012	Succeeded by Rıza Kayaalp
Awards
Preceded by (Brazil) Thaísa Menezes	Best Server of FIVB World Grand Prix; 2012	Succeeded by Incumbent
Preceded by (Germany) Margareta Kozuch	Best Scorer of Women's European Volleyball Championship; 2011	Succeeded by Incumbent
Preceded by (Cuba) Yumilka Ruíz	Best Scorer of FIVB Women's Volleyball World Championship; 2006, 2010	Succeeded by Incumbent
Preceded by new creation	Best Scorer of Women's European Volleyball League; 2009, 2010	Succeeded by (Czech Republic) Helena Havelková
Preceded by new creation	Most Valuable Player of Women's European Volleyball League; 2009	Succeeded by (Serbia) Jelena Nikolić
