= Gabi Schottroff =

Swiss volleyball player (born 1996)

Personal information
- Nationality: Swiss
- Born: 29 January 1996 (age 30)
- Height: 1.92 m (6 ft 3 1/2 in)
- Weight: 78 kg (172 lb)
- Spike: 302 cm (119 in)
- Block: 285 cm (112 in)

Volleyball information
- Position: Middle blocker
- Number: 4

Career
| Years | Teams |
|---|---|
| 2018 | Voléro Zürich |
Honours
Women's volleyball
Representing Switzerland

Gabi Schottroff (born 8 February 1997) is a Swiss volleyball player. She is a member of the Women's National Team. She participated at the 2017 Montreux Volley Masters, and 2018 Montreux Volley Masters. She plays for Voléro Zürich.
