= Giovanni Caprara (volleyball) =

Italian volleyball coach

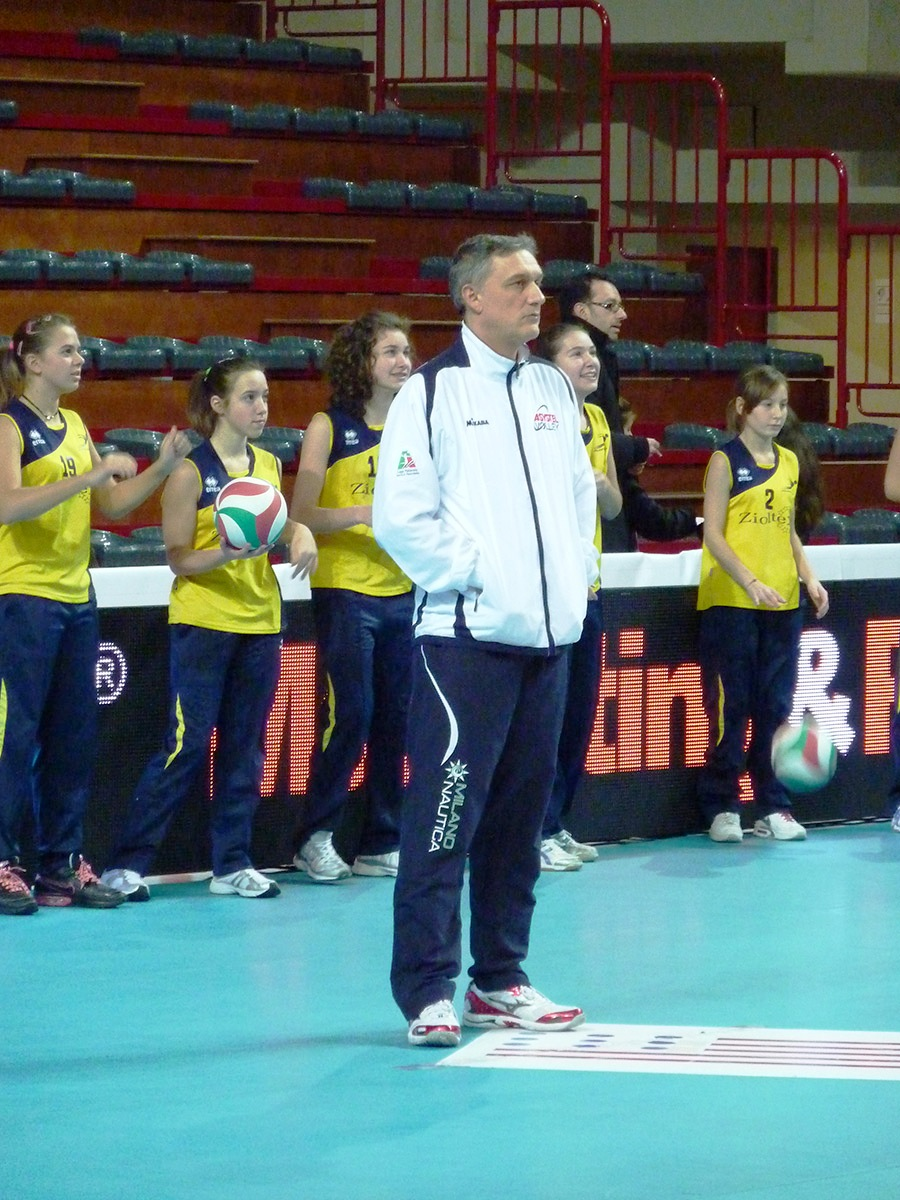

Giovanni Caprara (born November 7, 1962, Medicina) is an Italian women's volleyball coach who currently manages Azerbaijan women's national volleyball Netherlands women's team.

In 2005-2008 head coach of the Russian women's team, from April 2010 to March 2011 the head coach of women's national team of Greece. Merited Coach of Russia (2008).

With the season-2014/15 head coach Eczacıbaşı VitrA. Caprara led the Istanbul team to victory CEV Champions League and the Club World Championship.

Wife - Irina Kirillova, one of the best volleyball players of the world the 2nd half of 1980 (1988 Olympic champion, world champion in 1990 in the USSR team), after the collapse of the Soviet Union came to play for Croatia. The couple met when Kirillova played in Bergamo, where Caprara was the second coach.
