= 2015 FIVB Volleyball Women's Club World Championship =

2015 Women's Club World Championship

Tournament details
- Host country: Switzerland
- Dates: 6–10 May
- Teams: 6
- Venue: 1 (in 1 host city)

Final positions
- Champions: (Turkey) Eczacıbaşı VitrA (1st title)

Tournament awards
- MVP: (United States) Jordan Larson (Eczacıbaşı VitrA)

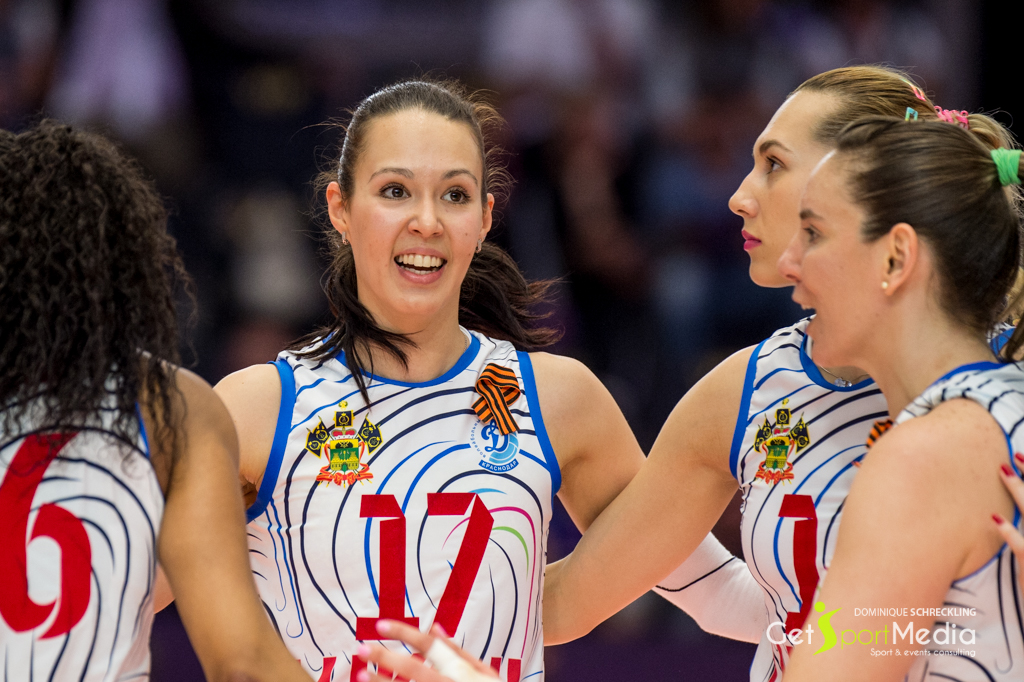
Dinamo Krasnodars Natalia Dianskaya in semifinale match vs Rexona Ades Rio

The 2015 FIVB Women's Club World Championship was the 9th edition of the event. It was held in Zürich, Switzerland, from 6 to 10 May 2015. The Turkish club Eczacıbaşı VitrA won the championship.

== Qualification ==
Team	Qualified as
(Switzerland) Voléro Zürich	Hosts
(Turkey) Eczacıbaşı VitrA	2015 European Champions
(Japan) Hisamitsu Springs	2014 Asian Champions
(Brazil) Rexona Ades Rio	2015 South American Champion
(Russia) Dinamo Krasnodar	Wildcard
(Dominican Republic) Mirador	Wildcard

== Pools composition ==
Pool A	Pool B
(Switzerland) Voléro Zürich (Brazil) Rexona Ades Rio (Dominican Republic) Mirador	(Turkey) Eczacıbaşı VitrA (Japan) Hisamitsu Springs (Russia) Dinamo Krasnodar

== Venue ==
All rounds
(Switzerland) Zürich
Saalsporthalle
Capacity: 2,300
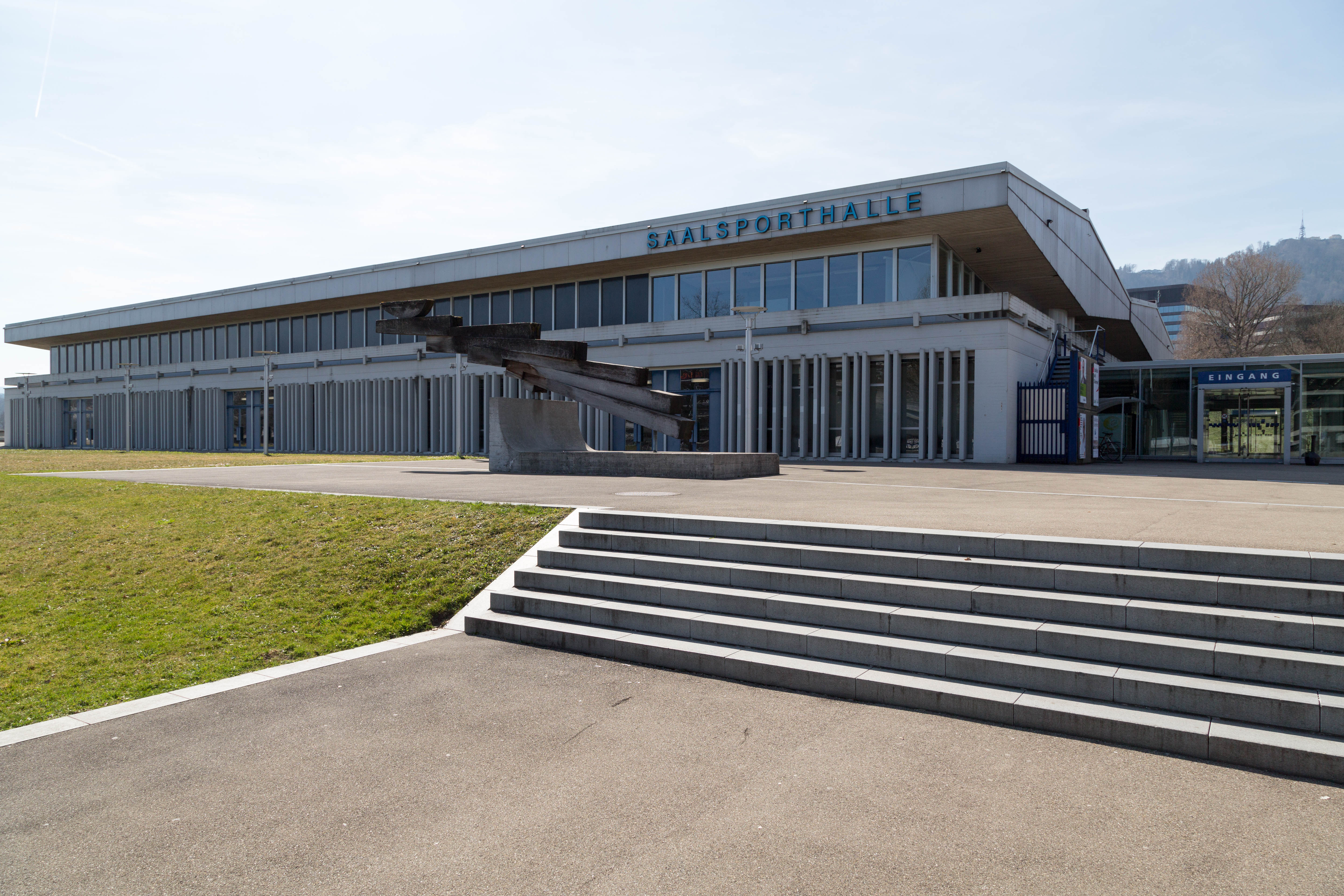

== Pool standing procedure ==
Match won 3–0 or 3–1: 3 points for the winner, 0 points for the loser
Match won 3–2: 2 points for the winner, 1 point for the loser
In case of tie, the teams will be classified according to the following criteria:
number of matches won, sets ratio and points ratio

== Preliminary round ==
- All times are Central European Summer Time (UTC+2).

=== Pool A ===
Pos	Team	Pld	W	L	Pts	SW	SL	SR	SPW	SPL	SPR	Qualification
1	(Brazil) Rexona Ades Rio	2	2	0	6	6	1	6.000	188	107	1.757	Semifinals
2	(Switzerland) Voléro Zürich	2	1	1	3	4	4	1.000	202	185	1.092	Semifinals
3	(Dominican Republic) Mirador	2	0	2	0	1	6	0.167	123	170	0.724	

Date	Time		Score		Set 1	Set 2	Set 3	Set 4	Set 5	Total	Report
6 May	20:00	Voléro Zürich (Switzerland)	3–1	(Dominican Republic) Mirador	20–25	25–17	25–15	25–15		95–72	P2 P3
7 May	20:00	Voléro Zürich (Switzerland)	1–3	(Brazil) Rexona Ades Rio	28–30	22–25	35–33	22–25		107–113	P2 P3
8 May	17:30	Rexona Ades Rio (Brazil)	3–0	(Dominican Republic) Mirador	25–14	25–19	25–18			75–51	P2 P3

=== Pool B ===
Pos	Team	Pld	W	L	Pts	SW	SL	SR	SPW	SPL	SPR	Qualification
1	(Turkey) Eczacıbaşı VitrA	2	1	1	4	5	3	1.667	183	164	1.116	Semifinals
2	(Russia) Dinamo Krasnodar	2	1	1	3	3	4	0.750	161	154	1.045	Semifinals
3	(Japan) Hisamitsu Springs	2	1	1	2	4	5	0.800	177	203	0.872	

Date	Time		Score		Set 1	Set 2	Set 3	Set 4	Set 5	Total	Report
6 May	17:30	Eczacıbaşı VitrA (Turkey)	2–3	(Japan) Hisamitsu Springs	25–12	26–28	20–25	25–19	11–15	107–99	P2 P3
7 May	17:30	Eczacıbaşı VitrA (Turkey)	3–0	(Russia) Dinamo Krasnodar	25–22	26–24	25–19			76–65	P2 P3
8 May	20:00	Hisamitsu Springs (Japan)	1–3	(Russia) Dinamo Krasnodar	25–21	21–25	14–25	18–25		78–96	P2 P3

== Final round ==
- All times are Central European Summer Time (UTC+2).

Semifinals
9 May
(Brazil) Rexona Ades Rio	1
(Russia) Dinamo Krasnodar	3
9 May
(Turkey) Eczacıbaşı VitrA	3
(Switzerland) Voléro Zürich	1

Final
10 May
(Russia) Dinamo Krasnodar	1
(Turkey) Eczacıbaşı VitrA	3
3rd place match
10 May
(Brazil) Rexona Ades Rio	0
(Switzerland) Voléro Zürich	3

=== Semifinals ===
Date	Time		Score		Set 1	Set 2	Set 3	Set 4	Set 5	Total	Report
9 May	15:30	Eczacıbaşı VitrA (Turkey)	3–1	(Switzerland) Voléro Zürich	25–17	25–22	18–25	34–32		102–96	P2 P3
9 May	18:00	Rexona Ades Rio (Brazil)	1–3	(Russia) Dinamo Krasnodar	21–25	27–25	23–25	21–25		92–100	P2 P3

=== 3rd place match ===
Date	Time		Score		Set 1	Set 2	Set 3	Set 4	Set 5	Total	Report
10 May	14:00	Rexona Ades Rio (Brazil)	0–3	(Switzerland) Voléro Zürich	21–25	17–25	18–25			56–75	P2 P3

=== Final ===
Date	Time		Score		Set 1	Set 2	Set 3	Set 4	Set 5	Total	Report
10 May	16:30	Dinamo Krasnodar (Russia)	1–3	(Turkey) Eczacıbaşı VitrA	16–25	21–25	26–24	19–25		82–99	P2 P3

== Final standing ==
Rank	Team
1st place, gold medalist(s)	(Turkey) Eczacıbaşı VitrA
2nd place, silver medalist(s)	(Russia) Dinamo Krasnodar
3rd place, bronze medalist(s)	(Switzerland) Voléro Zürich
4	(Brazil) Rexona Ades Rio
5	(Japan) Hisamitsu Springs
5	(Dominican Republic) Mirador

2015 Women's Club World Champions

1st title

Team roster
Bethania de la Cruz, Gülden Kayalar, Dilara Bağcı, Ceylan Arısan, Şeyma Ercan, Asuman Karakoyun, Büşra Cansu, Jordan Larson, Nilay Özdemir, Esra Gümüş (c), Christiane Fürst, Gözde Yılmaz, Neslihan Demir, Maja Poljak
Head coach
Giovanni Caprara

== Awards ==
- Most valuable player
  (United States) Jordan Larson ( (Turkey) Eczacıbaşı VitrA)
- Best Opposite
  (Ukraine) Olesia Rykhliuk ( (Switzerland) Volero Zürich)
- Best outside spiker
  (Russia) Tatiana Kosheleva ( (Russia) Dinamo Krasnodar)
  (Brazil) Fernanda Garay ( (Russia) Dinamo Krasnodar)
- Best middle blockers
  (Croatia) Maja Poljak ( (Turkey) Eczacıbaşı VitrA)
  (Brazil) Ana Carolina da Silva ( (Brazil) Rexona Ades Rio)
- Best setter
  (Brazil) Fabíola de Souza ( (Russia) Dinamo Krasnodar)
- Best libero
  (Serbia) Silvija Popović ( (Switzerland) Volero Zürich)
