= Gözde Yılmaz =

Turkish volleyball player (born 1991)

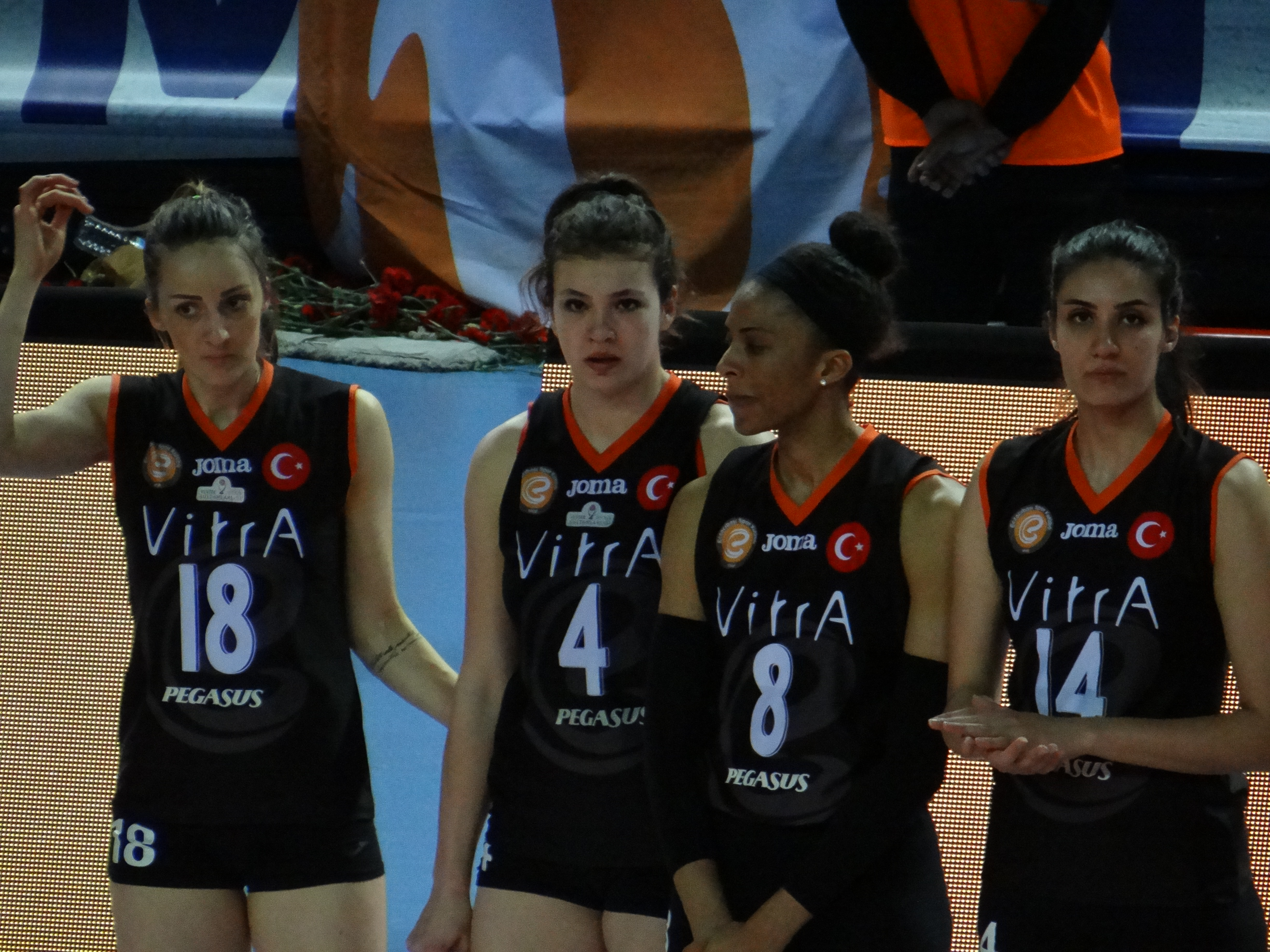
- Yılmaz (#14) in 2018

Personal information
- Born: 9 September 1991 (age 35); Ankara, Turkey
- Height: 1.95 m (6 ft 5 in)
- Weight: 82 kg (181 lb)
- Spike: 316 cm (124 in)
- Block: 300 cm (118 in)

Volleyball information
- Position: Spiker
- Current club: Eczacıbaşı VitrA

National team
Turkey
Honours
Women's volleyball
Representing Turkey
European Games
Gold medal – first place	2015 Baku	Team
Montreux Volley Masters
Gold medal – first place	2015 Montreux	Team
Women's European Volleyball League
Gold medal – first place	2014 Germany/Turkey	Team

Gözde Yılmaz (born 9 September 1991 in Ankara) is a Turkish volleyball player. She is 195 cm (6.40 ft) tall at 82 kg (181 lb). Currently, she plays for Eczacıbaşı VitrA. Yılmaz is a member of the Turkey women's national volleyball team.

== Career ==
=== Clubs ===
A member of Eczacıbaşı VitrA, she was loaned out to Sarıyer Belediyesi in the 2013–14 season.

=== National team ===
She was called up to the Turkey women's national volleyball team, and played as team captain at the 2014 Women's European Volleyball League that won the gold medal.

== Clubs ==
- (Turkey) TED Ankara Kolejliler Volleyball (2000–2007)
- (Turkey) Eczacıbaşı VitrA (2007–2009)
- (Turkey) Yeşilyurt Istanbul (2009–2010)
- (Turkey) Eczacıbaşı VitrA (2010–2013)
- (Turkey) Sarıyer Belediyespor (2013–2014)
- (Turkey) Eczacıbaşı VitrA (2014–2015)
- (Italy) Futura Volley Busto Arsizio (2015–2016)
- (Turkey) Eczacıbaşı VitrA (2021-)

== Awards ==
=== National team ===
- 2014 Women's European Volleyball League - (gold) champion

== See also ==
- Turkish women in sports
