= Volero Zürich =

Swiss volleyball club

Volero Zurich
- 2017–18
- Full name: Volero Zurich
- Founded: 1973
- Ground: Sporthalle Im Birch and Saalsporthalle, both in Zürich
- Chairman: Stav Jacobi
- Head coach: Avital Selinger
- League: Ligue A
- Website: Club home page

Uniforms
Home	Away

Volero Zürich is a Swiss volleyball club based in Zürich. It has many teams (men's, women's and youth volleyball) with the women's team being the most successful and currently playing in the National League A. Since the mid 2000s, the club has also frequently participated in European competitions, most notably the CEV Women's Champions League. In 2018 the elite women's team joined Entente sportive Le Cannet-Rocheville, forming Volero Le Cannet, a team located in Le Cannet, France (Volero Zürich kept an elite team, but it restarted in a lower league).

== Previous names ==
The club have competed under the following names:

- VBC Voléro Zürich (1973–2011), still used by the men's team
- Volero Zürich (2011–), used by the women's team

== History ==
Established in 1973 as VBC Voléro Zürich, the early success came from the men's team which won a national championship in 1977 and two national cups (in 1975 and 1978).

From the late 1990s, the women's team started to progress in the national leagues arriving at the National League A (NLA), but after just a couple seasons, due to financial reasons, the club was relegated. In 2003, part of the club (female elite squad and more than 120 young volleyball talents) was professionalized by founding the independent Volero Zürich AG, and the rest of the club remained as VBC Voléro Zürich (male and youth teams). Soon after the women's team started dominating the national league and cup, winning each on 12 occasions. The national success allowed the club to take part in European competitions, playing the Women's CEV Cup twice (in 2005–06 and 2009–10) and the CEV Women's Champions League over ten times with a best result of fourth place in 2006–07. The club also participated in multiple editions of the FIVB Volleyball Women's Club World Championship finishing third place in 2015 and 2017. The club has won the Women's Top Volley International (a minor international tournament) twice, in 2007 and in 2010.

== Venues ==
Volero Zürich AG hosts matches in two main venues, both located in Zürich:

- Sportanlage Im Birch (National League / Swiss Cup) - 850 capacity
- Saalsporthalle (Champions League) - 2,500 capacity

== Honours ==
=== Men ===
National competitions

- National League A: 1

1976–77

- Swiss Cup: 2

1974–75, 1977–78

=== Women ===
National competitions

- National League A: 12

2004–05, 2005–06, 2006–07, 2007–08, 2009–10, 2010–11, 2011–12, 2012–13, 2013–14, 2014–15, 2015–16, 2016–17

- Swiss Cup: 12

2004–05, 2005–06, 2006–07, 2007–08, 2009–10, 2010–11, 2011–12, 2012–13, 2013–14, 2014–15, 2015–16, 2016–17

== Team ==
2017–2018 Team
No.	Name	Date of birth	Height	Weight	Spike	Block	Position
1	(Russia) Angelina Lazarenko	13 April 1998 (age 28)	1.93 m (6 ft 4 in)	80 kg (180 lb)	320 cm (130 in)	305 cm (120 in)	Middle-blocker
2	(Finland) Tiiamari Sievänen	19 July 1994 (age 31)	1.65 m (5 ft 5 in)	60 kg (130 lb)	275 cm (108 in)	287 cm (113 in)	Libero
3	(Serbia) Ljubica Milojević	13 February 1999 (age 27)	1.93 m (6 ft 4 in)	70 kg (150 lb)	300 cm (120 in)	300 cm (120 in)	Middle-blocker
4	(Brazil) Samara Almeida	16 July 1992 (age 33)	1.85 m (6 ft 1 in)	61 kg (134 lb)	293 cm (115 in)	278 cm (109 in)	Outside-spiker
5	(Bulgaria) Gergana Dimitrova	28 February 1996 (age 30)	1.84 m (6 ft 0 in)	71 kg (157 lb)	305 cm (120 in)	288 cm (113 in)	Outside-spiker
6	(Switzerland) Gabi Schottroff	8 February 1997 (age 29)	1.92 m (6 ft 4 in)	78 kg (172 lb)	302 cm (119 in)	285 cm (112 in)	Middle-blocker
7	(Serbia) Ana Antonijević	26 August 1987 (age 38)	1.85 m (6 ft 1 in)	71 kg (157 lb)	282 cm (111 in)	269 cm (106 in)	Setter
8	(Serbia) Silvija Popović	15 March 1986 (age 40)	1.78 m (5 ft 10 in)	65 kg (143 lb)	286 cm (113 in)	276 cm (109 in)	Libero
11	(Bulgaria) Mira Todorova	12 April 1994 (age 32)	1.87 m (6 ft 2 in)	77 kg (170 lb)	312 cm (123 in)	300 cm (120 in)	Middle-blocker
12	(Russia) / (Cuba) Rosir Calderón	28 December 1984 (age 41)	1.91 m (6 ft 3 in)	73 kg (161 lb)	330 cm (130 in)	325 cm (128 in)	Opposite
13	(Russia) Anastasia Kornienko	9 September 1992 (age 33)	1.84 m (6 ft 0 in)	71 kg (157 lb)	290 cm (110 in)	278 cm (109 in)	Setter
14	(Switzerland) Julie Lengweiler	6 November 1998 (age 27)	1.86 m (6 ft 1 in)	70 kg (150 lb)	302 cm (119 in)	285 cm (112 in)	Opposite
17	(Switzerland) Laura Unternährer	11 July 1993 (age 32)	1.79 m (5 ft 10 in)	70 kg (150 lb)	303 cm (119 in)	285 cm (112 in)	Outside-spiker
18	(Sweden) Alexandra Lazić	24 September 1994 (age 31)	1.85 m (6 ft 1 in)	72 kg (159 lb)	318 cm (125 in)	307 cm (121 in)	Outside-spiker
Head coach: (Brazil) Anderson Rodrigues (until December 2017) / (Netherlands) Avital Selinger (from December 2017)

2016–2017 Team
#	Player	Position	Height (m)	Birth date
1	(Switzerland) Julie Lengweiler	Wing Spiker	1,86 m	06/11/1998
3	(Brazil) Fabíola de Souza	Setter	1,84 m	03/02/1983
4	(Serbia) Bojana Živković	Setter	1,86 m	29/03/1988
5	(Bulgaria) Dobriana Rabadzhieva	Wing Spiker	1,94 m	14/06/1991
6	(Switzerland) Gabi Schottroff	Middle Blocker	1,92 m	08/02/1997
7	(Ukraine) Olesia Rykhliuk	Opposite	1,96 m	11/12/1987
8	(Serbia) Silvija Popović	Libero	1,75 m	15/03/1986
9	(Azerbaijan) Natalya Mammadova	Wing Spiker	1,95 m	02/12/1984
10	(Russia) Irina Malkova	Middle Blocker	1,92 m	05/01/1989
12	(Brazil) Mari Paraíba	Wing Spiker	1,81 m	30/07/1986
13	(Turkey) Gizem Karadayi	Libero	1,76 m	14/01/1987
14	(Cuba) Kenia Carcaces	Wing Spiker	1,89 m	23/01/1986
15	(Russia) Ekaterina Orlova	Middle Blocker	1,93 m	21/10/1987
16	(United States) Foluke Akinradewo	Middle Blocker	1,91 m	05/10/1987
17	(Switzerland) Laura Unternährer	Wing Spiker	1,79 m	11/07/1993
Head coach: (Serbia) Zoran Terzić

2014–2015 Team
#	Player	Position	Height (m)	Birth date
1	(Ukraine) Yevgeniya Nyukhalova	Opposite	1,93 m	23/05/1995
2	(Switzerland) Laura Unternährer	Wing Spiker	1,79 m	11/07/1993
3	(Serbia) Nađa Ninković	Middle Blocker	1,92 m	01/11/1991
5	(Bulgaria) Dobriana Rabadzhieva	Wing Spiker	1,90 m	14/06/1991
7	(Ukraine) Olesia Rykhliuk	Opposite	1,96 m	11/12/1987
8	(Serbia) Silvija Popović	Libero	1,75 m	15/03/1986
9	(Azerbaijan) Natalya Mammadova	Wing Spiker	1,95 m	02/12/1984
11	(United States) Natalie Hagglund	Libero	1,74 m	01/07/1992
12	(Serbia) Ana Antonijević	Setter	1,85 m	26/08/1987
14	(Cuba) Rachel Sanchez	Middle Blocker	1,88 m	09/01/1989
15	(United States) Courtney Thompson	Setter	1,70 m	04/11/1984
16	(Switzerland) Ines Granvorka	Wing Spiker	1,79 m	13/08/1991
17	(United States) Emily Hartong	Wing Spiker	1,89 m	04/02/1992
18	(Russia) Anna Kupriianova	Middle Blocker	1,90 m	20/11/1987
19	(Croatia) Ana Grbac	Setter	1,87 m	23/03/1988

== Notable players ==
- (Azerbaijan) Valeriya Korotenko
- (Azerbaijan) Oksana Parkhomenko
- (Serbia and Montenegro) Anja Spasojević
- (Serbia) Slađana Erić
- (Serbia) Tijana Malešević
- (Serbia) Nina Rosić
- (Serbia) Bojana Živković
- (Serbia) Silvija Popović
- (Serbia) Brankica Mihajlović
- (United States) Foluke Akinradewo
- (Turkey) Melisa Vargas
