= Ceylan Arısan =

Turkish volleyball player (born 1994)

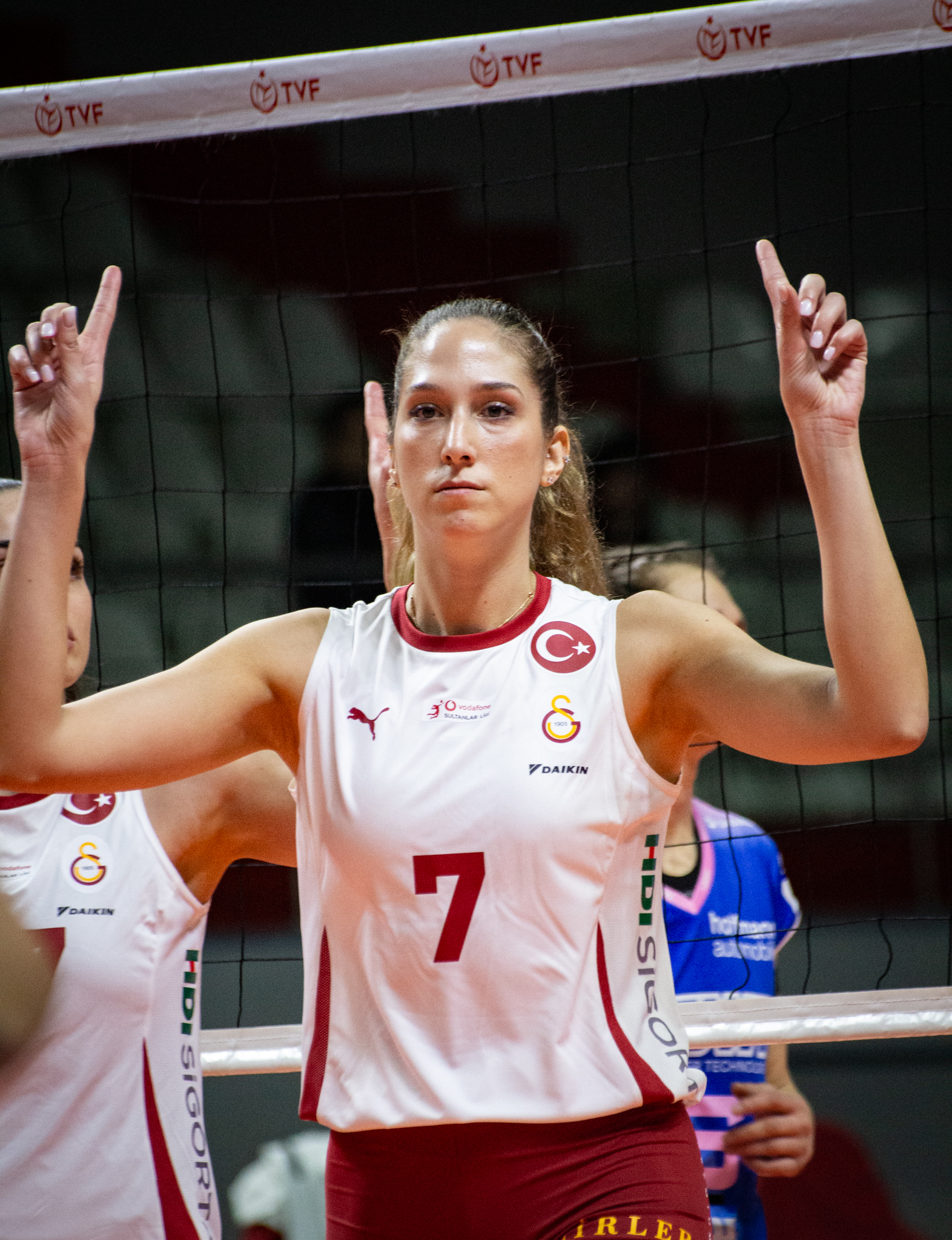

Personal information
- Born: 1 January 1994 (age 32); İzmir, Turkey
- Height: 1.90 cm (1 in)
- Weight: 70 kg (154 lb)
- Spike: 306 cm (120 in)
- Block: 297 cm (117 in)

Volleyball information
- Position: Middle blocker

Career
Years	Teams
2007–2008; 2008–2012; 2013–2014; 2014–2017; 2017–2018; 2018–2019; 2019–2020; 2020–2021; 2021–2022; 2022–2023; 2023–2024; 2024–2025	(Turkey) Karşıyaka İzmir (Turkey) Eczacıbaşı VitrA (Turkey) Sarıyer Belediyesi (Turkey) Eczacıbaşı VitrA (Turkey) Beşiktaş (Turkey) Beylikdüzü VİK (Turkey) Türk Hava Yolları (Turkey) Çan Gençlik Kalespor (Spain) Feel Volley Alcobendas (Turkey) SigortaShop (Turkey) Sarıyer Belediyesi (Turkey) Galatasaray

National team
Turkey
Honours
Women's volleyball
Representing Turkey
Women's European Volleyball League
Gold medal – first place	2014 Germany/Turkey	Team
Women's U23 World Championship
Silver medal – second place	2015 Ankara	Team
Women's Junior European Championship
Gold medal – first place	2012 Ankara	Team
Girls Youth World Championship
Gold medal – first place	2011 Ankara	Team
European Youth Summer Olympic Festival
Bronze medal – third place	2011 Trabzon	Team

Ceylan Arısan (born 1 January 1994) is a Turkish female volleyball player. She is 190 cm (6.2 ft) tall at 70 kg (150 lb) and plays in the middle blocker position.

== Club career ==
She was with Karşıyaka İzmir before she transferred in 2008 to Eczacıbaşı VitrA.

=== Galatasaray ===
She signed a 1-year deal with Galatasaray on 7 August 2024.

== International career ==
Arısan is a member of the Turkey women's national volleyball team, and wears number 6.

== Awards ==
=== National team ===
- 2011 CEV Girls Youth European Championship - Gold
- 2011 FIVB Girls Youth World Championship - Gold
- 2011 European Youth Summer Olympic Festival - Bronze
- 2012 Women's Junior European Volleyball Championship - Gold
- 2014 Women's European Volleyball League - Gold
- 2015 FIVB Volleyball Women's U23 World Championship - Silver
