= 2017 FIVB Volleyball Women's World Grand Champions Cup squads =

This article shows the rosters of all participating teams at the Women's World Champions Cup 2017 in Tokyo and Nagoya, Japan.

== Brazil ==
The following is the Brazilian roster in the 2017 FIVB Volleyball Women's World Grand Champions Cup.

Head coach: José Roberto Guimarães

No.	Name	Date of birth	Height	Weight	Spike	Block	2016–17 club
1	Mara Leão	26 July 1991	1.90 m (6 ft 3 in)	77 kg (170 lb)	310 cm (120 in)	297 cm (117 in)	(Brazil) Camponesa Minas
3	Naiane Rios	29 November 1994	1.79 m (5 ft 10 in)	63 kg (139 lb)	276 cm (109 in)	281 cm (111 in)	(Brazil) Camponesa Minas
4	Ana Carolina da Silva	8 April 1991	1.83 m (6 ft 0 in)	73 kg (161 lb)	290 cm (110 in)	290 cm (110 in)	(Brazil) Rexona-Sesc
7	Rosamaria Montibeller	9 April 1994	1.85 m (6 ft 1 in)	76 kg (168 lb)	291 cm (115 in)	285 cm (112 in)	(Brazil) Camponesa Minas
9	Roberta Ratzke	28 April 1990	1.85 m (6 ft 1 in)	71 kg (157 lb)	287 cm (113 in)	278 cm (109 in)	(Brazil) Rexona-Sesc
10	Gabriela Guimarães	19 May 1994	1.80 m (5 ft 11 in)	59 kg (130 lb)	295 cm (116 in)	274 cm (108 in)	(Brazil) Rexona-Sesc
11	Tandara Caixeta	30 October 1988	1.84 m (6 ft 0 in)	87 kg (192 lb)	305 cm (120 in)	297 cm (117 in)	(Brazil) Vôlei Nestlé
12	Natália Pereira (c)	4 April 1989	1.83 m (6 ft 0 in)	76 kg (168 lb)	300 cm (120 in)	288 cm (113 in)	(Turkey) Fenerbahçe
13	Amanda Francisco	16 August 1988	1.80 m (5 ft 11 in)	62 kg (137 lb)	304 cm (120 in)	286 cm (113 in)	(Brazil) Terracap Brasília
14	Gabriella Souza	14 December 1993	1.75 m (5 ft 9 in)	69 kg (152 lb)	296 cm (117 in)	273 cm (107 in)	(Brazil) Vôlei Nestlé
15	Monique Pavão	31 October 1986	1.78 m (5 ft 10 in)	67 kg (148 lb)	294 cm (116 in)	285 cm (112 in)	(Brazil) Rexona-Sesc
17	Suelen Pinto	4 October 1987	1.66 m (5 ft 5 in)	81 kg (179 lb)	256 cm (101 in)	238 cm (94 in)	(Italy) Foppapedretti Bergamo
20	Ana Beatriz Corrêa	7 February 1992	1.87 m (6 ft 2 in)	70 kg (150 lb)	298 cm (117 in)	292 cm (115 in)	(Brazil) Vôlei Nestlé
21	Saraelen Lima	16 April 1994	1.84 m (6 ft 0 in)	76 kg (168 lb)	302 cm (119 in)	282 cm (111 in)	(Brazil) Vôlei Nestlé

== China ==
The following is the Chinese roster in the 2017 FIVB Volleyball Women's World Grand Champions Cup.

Head coach: An Jiajie

No.	Name	Date of birth	Height	Weight	Spike	Block	2016–17 club
1	Yuan Xinyue	21 December 1996	2.01 m (6 ft 7 in)	78 kg (172 lb)	317 cm (125 in)	311 cm (122 in)	(China) Army
2	Zhu Ting (c)	29 November 1994	1.98 m (6 ft 6 in)	78 kg (172 lb)	327 cm (129 in)	300 cm (120 in)	(Turkey) Vakıfbank Sports Club
6	Gong Xiangyu	21 April 1997	1.86 m (6 ft 1 in)	72 kg (159 lb)	313 cm (123 in)	302 cm (119 in)	(China) Jiangsu
7	Diao Linyu	7 April 1994	1.82 m (6 ft 0 in)	69 kg (152 lb)	309 cm (122 in)	303 cm (119 in)	(China) Jiangsu
8	Yao Di	15 August 1992	1.82 m (6 ft 0 in)	65 kg (143 lb)	306 cm (120 in)	298 cm (117 in)	(China) Tianjin
9	Zhang Changning	6 November 1995	1.93 m (6 ft 4 in)	80 kg (180 lb)	315 cm (124 in)	303 cm (119 in)	(China) Jiangsu
10	Liu Xiaotong	16 February 1990	1.88 m (6 ft 2 in)	80 kg (180 lb)	312 cm (123 in)	300 cm (120 in)	(China) Beijing BAW
12	Zheng Yixin	6 May 1995	1.87 m (6 ft 2 in)	69 kg (152 lb)	305 cm (120 in)	300 cm (120 in)	(China) Fujian Xi Meng Bao
13	Wang Chenyue	22 August 1995	1.93 m (6 ft 4 in)	75 kg (165 lb)	305 cm (120 in)	295 cm (116 in)	(China) Jiangsu
15	Lin Li	5 July 1992	1.71 m (5 ft 7 in)	65 kg (143 lb)	294 cm (116 in)	294 cm (116 in)	(China) Fujian Xi Meng Bao
16	Ding Xia	13 January 1990	1.80 m (5 ft 11 in)	67 kg (148 lb)	305 cm (120 in)	300 cm (120 in)	(China) Liaoning
18	Wang Mengjie	14 November 1995	1.72 m (5 ft 8 in)	65 kg (143 lb)	289 cm (114 in)	280 cm (110 in)	(China) Shandong
20	Yan Ni	2 March 1987	1.92 m (6 ft 4 in)	74 kg (163 lb)	317 cm (125 in)	306 cm (120 in)	(China) Liaoning
22	Zeng Chunlei	3 November 1989	1.87 m (6 ft 2 in)	67 kg (148 lb)	315 cm (124 in)	315 cm (124 in)	(China) Beijing BAW

== Japan ==
The following is the Japanese roster in the 2017 FIVB Volleyball Women's World Grand Champions Cup.

Head coach: Kumi Nakada

No.	Name	Date of birth	Height	Weight	Spike	Block	2016–17 club
3	Nana Iwasaka (c)	3 July 1990	1.87 m (6 ft 2 in)	76 kg (168 lb)	298 cm (117 in)	293 cm (115 in)	(Japan) Hisamitsu Springs
4	Risa Shinnabe	11 July 1990	1.73 m (5 ft 8 in)	64 kg (141 lb)	293 cm (115 in)	285 cm (112 in)	(Japan) Hisamitsu Springs
5	Erika Araki	3 August 1984	1.86 m (6 ft 1 in)	78 kg (172 lb)	304 cm (120 in)	301 cm (119 in)	(Japan) Toyota Auto Body Queenseis
7	Yuki Ishii	8 May 1991	1.80 m (5 ft 11 in)	68 kg (150 lb)	302 cm (119 in)	287 cm (113 in)	(Japan) Hisamitsu Springs
9	Haruyo Shimamura	4 March 1992	1.82 m (6 ft 0 in)	77 kg (170 lb)	305 cm (120 in)	280 cm (110 in)	(Japan) NEC Red Rockets
10	Koyomi Tominaga	1 May 1989	1.76 m (5 ft 9 in)	67 kg (148 lb)	305 cm (120 in)	280 cm (110 in)	(Japan) Ageo Medics
11	Yurie Nabeya	15 December 1993	1.76 m (5 ft 9 in)	57 kg (126 lb)	302 cm (119 in)	292 cm (115 in)	(Japan) Denso Airybees
12	Miya Sato	7 March 1990	1.74 m (5 ft 9 in)	61 kg (134 lb)	284 cm (112 in)	280 cm (110 in)	(Japan) Hitachi Rivale
13	Mai Okumura	31 October 1990	1.77 m (5 ft 10 in)	66 kg (146 lb)	297 cm (117 in)	285 cm (112 in)	(Japan) JT Marvelous
18	Mami Uchiseto	25 October 1991	1.71 m (5 ft 7 in)	70 kg (150 lb)	296 cm (117 in)	285 cm (112 in)	(Japan) Hitachi Rivale
19	Mari Horikawa	3 May 1992	1.83 m (6 ft 0 in)	70 kg (150 lb)	302 cm (119 in)	288 cm (113 in)	(Japan) Toray Arrows
20	Mako Kobata	15 August 1992	1.64 m (5 ft 5 in)	55 kg (121 lb)	284 cm (112 in)	274 cm (108 in)	(Japan) JT Marvelous
21	Kotoe Inoue	15 February 1990	1.62 m (5 ft 4 in)	53 kg (117 lb)	287 cm (113 in)	275 cm (108 in)	(Japan) JT Marvelous
23	Rika Nomoto	21 September 1991	1.80 m (5 ft 11 in)	73 kg (161 lb)	310 cm (120 in)	291 cm (115 in)	(Japan) Hisamitsu Springs

== South Korea ==
The following is the Korean roster in the 2017 FIVB Volleyball Women's World Grand Champions Cup.

Head coach: Hong Sung-jin

No.	Name	Date of birth	Height	Weight	Spike	Block	2016–17 club
1	Lee Jae-eun	11 March 1987	1.76 m (5 ft 9 in)	63 kg (139 lb)	276 cm (109 in)	257 cm (101 in)	(South Korea) Heungkuk Life
2	Kim Yeong-yeon	1 December 1993	1.62 m (5 ft 4 in)	48 kg (106 lb)	250 cm (98 in)	240 cm (94 in)	(South Korea) Suwon Hyundai
3	Jeong Si-young	12 March 1993	1.79 m (5 ft 10 in)	60 kg (130 lb)	295 cm (116 in)	275 cm (108 in)	(South Korea) Daejeon KGC
6	Lee Go-eun	9 January 1995	1.70 m (5 ft 7 in)	64 kg (141 lb)	275 cm (108 in)	265 cm (104 in)	(South Korea) IBK Altos
7	Lee Jae-yeong	15 October 1996	1.79 m (5 ft 10 in)	63 kg (139 lb)	286 cm (113 in)	267 cm (105 in)	(South Korea) Heungkuk Life
8	Na Hyun-jung	10 March 1990	1.63 m (5 ft 4 in)	54 kg (119 lb)	257 cm (101 in)	250 cm (98 in)	(South Korea) GS Caltex
9	Han Soo-ji	1 February 1989	1.82 m (6 ft 0 in)	78 kg (172 lb)	305 cm (120 in)	296 cm (117 in)	(South Korea) Daejeon KGC
11	Kim Su-ji (c)	11 July 1987	1.86 m (6 ft 1 in)	68 kg (150 lb)	303 cm (119 in)	294 cm (116 in)	(South Korea) IBK Altos
12	Yoo Seo-yeun	12 January 1999	1.75 m (5 ft 9 in)	62 kg (137 lb)	275 cm (108 in)	254 cm (100 in)	(South Korea) Korean Expressway
15	Kim Yu-ri	11 September 1991	1.82 m (6 ft 0 in)	75 kg (165 lb)	300 cm (120 in)	290 cm (110 in)	(South Korea) GS Caltex
17	Ha Hye-jin	7 September 1996	1.81 m (5 ft 11 in)	64 kg (141 lb)	290 cm (110 in)	280 cm (110 in)	(South Korea) Korean Expressway
18	Hwang Min-kyoung	2 June 1990	1.74 m (5 ft 9 in)	64 kg (141 lb)	290 cm (110 in)	282 cm (111 in)	(South Korea) Suwon Hyundai
19	Choi Su-bin	2 April 1994	1.75 m (5 ft 9 in)	64 kg (141 lb)	276 cm (109 in)	269 cm (106 in)	(South Korea) Daejeon KGC
20	Jeon Sae-yan	27 November 1996	1.78 m (5 ft 10 in)	67 kg (148 lb)	220 cm (87 in)	210 cm (83 in)	(South Korea) Korean Expressway

== Russia ==
The following is the Russian roster in the 2017 FIVB Volleyball Women's World Grand Champions Cup.

Head coach: Vladimir Kuzyutkin

No.	Name	Date of birth	Height	Weight	Spike	Block	2016–17 club
1	Yana Shcherban	6 September 1989	1.87 m (6 ft 2 in)	71 kg (157 lb)	298 cm (117 in)	294 cm (116 in)	(Russia) Dinamo Moscow
2	Mariia Frolova	1 November 1986	1.78 m (5 ft 10 in)	62 kg (137 lb)	297 cm (117 in)	289 cm (114 in)	(Russia) VC Yenisey Krasnoyarsk
3	Irina Filishtinskaia	14 June 1990	1.70 m (5 ft 7 in)	65 kg (143 lb)	285 cm (112 in)	275 cm (108 in)	(Russia) Dinamo Kazan
4	Svetlana Kryuchkova	4 April 1994	1.74 m (5 ft 9 in)	82 kg (181 lb)	317 cm (125 in)	305 cm (120 in)	(Russia) VC Zarechie Odintsovo
6	Irina Zaryazhko	4 October 1991	1.96 m (6 ft 5 in)	78 kg (172 lb)	305 cm (120 in)	290 cm (110 in)	(Russia) Dinamo Kazan
8	Nataliya Goncharova	1 June 1989	1.96 m (6 ft 5 in)	75 kg (165 lb)	315 cm (124 in)	306 cm (120 in)	(Russia) Dinamo Moscow
10	Ekaterina Pankova (c)	2 February 1990	1.75 m (5 ft 9 in)	64 kg (141 lb)	290 cm (110 in)	285 cm (112 in)	(Russia) Dinamo Moscow
11	Ekaterina Tretyakova	19 October 1984	1.76 m (5 ft 9 in)	65 kg (143 lb)	301 cm (119 in)	292 cm (115 in)	(Russia) Leningradka Saint Petersburg
14	Irina Fetisova	7 September 1994	1.90 m (6 ft 3 in)	76 kg (168 lb)	307 cm (121 in)	286 cm (113 in)	(Russia) Dinamo Moscow
15	Tatiana Kosheleva	23 December 1988	1.91 m (6 ft 3 in)	67 kg (148 lb)	315 cm (124 in)	305 cm (120 in)	(Turkey) Eczacibasi VitrA
16	Irina Voronkova	20 October 1995	1.90 m (6 ft 3 in)	84 kg (185 lb)	305 cm (120 in)	290 cm (110 in)	(Russia) Dinamo Kazan
18	Kseniia Ilchenko	31 October 1994	1.83 m (6 ft 0 in)	64 kg (141 lb)	300 cm (120 in)	286 cm (113 in)	(Russia) VC Uralochka-NTMK
19	Ekaterina Evdokimova	10 September 1994	1.90 m (6 ft 3 in)	73 kg (161 lb)	306 cm (120 in)	285 cm (112 in)	(Russia) VC Uralochka-NTMK
21	Ekaterina Efimova	3 July 1993	1.93 m (6 ft 4 in)	70 kg (150 lb)	305 cm (120 in)	295 cm (116 in)	(Russia) VC Yenisey Krasnoyarsk

== United States ==
The following is the American roster in the 2017 FIVB Volleyball Women's World Grand Champions Cup.

Head coach: Karch Kiraly

No.	Name	Date of birth	Height	Weight	Spike	Block	2016–17 club
3	Carli Lloyd (c)	6 August 1989	1.80 m (5 ft 11 in)	75 kg (165 lb)	313 cm (123 in)	295 cm (116 in)	(Italy) Pomì Casalmaggiore
4	Justine Wong	6 October 1995	1.68 m (5 ft 6 in)	66 kg (146 lb)	282 cm (111 in)	277 cm (109 in)	United States
5	Rachael Adams	3 June 1990	1.88 m (6 ft 2 in)	81 kg (179 lb)	318 cm (125 in)	307 cm (121 in)	(Turkey) Eczacıbaşı VitrA
6	TeTori Dixon	4 August 1992	1.91 m (6 ft 3 in)	83 kg (183 lb)	306 cm (120 in)	295 cm (116 in)	United States
7	Lauren Carlini	28 February 1995	1.85 m (6 ft 1 in)	77 kg (170 lb)	302 cm (119 in)	295 cm (116 in)	United States
8	Lauren Gibbemeyer	8 September 1988	1.87 m (6 ft 2 in)	71 kg (157 lb)	307 cm (121 in)	293 cm (115 in)	(Italy) Pomì Casalmaggiore
9	Madison Kingdon	20 April 1993	1.83 m (6 ft 0 in)	78 kg (172 lb)	307 cm (121 in)	293 cm (115 in)	(South Korea) Hwaseong IBK Altos
10	Jordan Larson	16 October 1986	1.88 m (6 ft 2 in)	75 kg (165 lb)	302 cm (119 in)	295 cm (116 in)	(Turkey) Eczacıbaşı VitrA
11	Andrea Drews	25 December 1993	1.91 m (6 ft 3 in)	77 kg (170 lb)	312 cm (123 in)	312 cm (123 in)	(Puerto Rico) Criollas de Caguas
14	Michelle Bartsch	12 February 1990	1.90 m (6 ft 3 in)	78 kg (172 lb)	305 cm (120 in)	296 cm (117 in)	(Italy) Südtirol Bolzano
15	Kimberly Hill	30 November 1989	1.93 m (6 ft 4 in)	72 kg (159 lb)	320 cm (130 in)	310 cm (120 in)	(Turkey) Vakifbank Istanbul
16	Foluke Akinradewo	5 October 1987	1.91 m (6 ft 3 in)	79 kg (174 lb)	331 cm (130 in)	300 cm (120 in)	(Switzerland) Voléro Zürich
17	Megan Courtney	27 October 1993	1.85 m (6 ft 1 in)	61 kg (134 lb)	315 cm (124 in)	300 cm (120 in)	(Poland) Impel Wrocław
29	Aiyana Abukusumo	6 April 1993	1.94 m (6 ft 4 in)	61 kg (134 lb)	300 cm (120 in)	290 cm (110 in)	(Germany) MTV Stuttgart

== See also ==
- 2017 FIVB Volleyball Men's World Grand Champions Cup squads
