= 2017 FIVB Volleyball Women's Club World Championship squads =

This article shows the rosters of all participating teams at the 2017 FIVB Volleyball Women's Club World Championship in Kobe, Japan.

== Pool A ==
=== Vakıfbank İstanbul ===
The following is the roster of the Turkish club Vakıfbank İstanbul in the 2017 FIVB Volleyball Women's Club World Championship.

- Head coach: (Italy) Giovanni Guidetti

No.	Name	Date of birth	Height	Weight	Spike	Block
1	(Turkey) Gizem Örge (L)	26 April 1993	1.70 m (5 ft 7 in)	60 kg (130 lb)	280 cm (110 in)	270 cm (110 in)
2	(Turkey) Gözde Sonsırma (C)	25 November 1985	1.83 m (6 ft 0 in)	70 kg (150 lb)	297 cm (117 in)	292 cm (115 in)
3	(Turkey) Cansu Özbay	17 October 1996	1.82 m (6 ft 0 in)	75 kg (165 lb)	285 cm (112 in)	284 cm (112 in)
5	(China) Zhu Ting	29 November 1994	1.95 m (6 ft 5 in)	78 kg (172 lb)	327 cm (129 in)	300 cm (120 in)
6	(Turkey) Kübra Akman	13 October 1994	1.97 m (6 ft 6 in)	88 kg (194 lb)	320 cm (130 in)	315 cm (124 in)
8	(Turkey) Melis Gürkaynak	20 April 1990	1.85 m (6 ft 1 in)	72 kg (159 lb)	295 cm (116 in)	285 cm (112 in)
9	(Turkey) Ayça Aykaç	27 February 1996	1.75 m (5 ft 9 in)	63 kg (139 lb)	270 cm (110 in)	260 cm (100 in)
10	(Netherlands) Lonneke Slöetjes	15 November 1990	1.92 m (6 ft 4 in)	72 kg (159 lb)	322 cm (127 in)	315 cm (124 in)
11	(Turkey) Naz Aydemir	14 August 1990	1.86 m (6 ft 1 in)	70 kg (150 lb)	304 cm (120 in)	300 cm (120 in)
12	(Turkey) Özgenur Yurtdagülen	6 August 1993	1.93 m (6 ft 4 in)	72 kg (159 lb)	300 cm (120 in)	288 cm (113 in)
14	(Turkey) Melis Durul	21 October 1993	1.85 m (6 ft 1 in)	65 kg (143 lb)	280 cm (110 in)	275 cm (108 in)
15	(United States) Kimberly Hill	30 November 1989	1.94 m (6 ft 4 in)	72 kg (159 lb)	320 cm (130 in)	310 cm (120 in)
16	(Serbia) Milena Rašić	25 October 1990	1.93 m (6 ft 4 in)	75 kg (165 lb)	315 cm (124 in)	310 cm (120 in)
17	(Turkey) Cansu Çetin	26 May 1993	1.83 m (6 ft 0 in)	69 kg (152 lb)	295 cm (116 in)	285 cm (112 in)

=== Dinamo Moscow ===
The following is the roster of the Russian club Dinamo Moscow in the 2017 FIVB Volleyball Women's Club World Championship.

Head coach: (Russia) Yury Panchenko

No.	Name	Date of birth	Height	Weight	Spike	Block
1	(Russia) Iuliia Morozova	8 January 1985	1.92 m (6 ft 4 in)	79 kg (174 lb)	305 cm (120 in)	301 cm (119 in)
3	(Russia) Anastasia Bavykina	6 July 1992	1.88 m (6 ft 2 in)	73 kg (161 lb)	313 cm (123 in)	300 cm (120 in)
5	(Russia) Anastasia Markova	16 October 1987	1.89 m (6 ft 2 in)	71 kg (157 lb)	305 cm (120 in)	300 cm (120 in)
6	(Russia) Yana Shcherban	6 September 1989	1.85 m (6 ft 1 in)	71 kg (157 lb)	298 cm (117 in)	294 cm (116 in)
7	(Russia) Ekaterina Romanenko	23 December 1993	1.70 m (5 ft 7 in)	62 kg (137 lb)	289 cm (114 in)	285 cm (112 in)
8	(Russia) Nataliya Goncharova	1 June 1989	1.94 m (6 ft 4 in)	77 kg (170 lb)	315 cm (124 in)	306 cm (120 in)
9	(Russia) Vera Ulyakina (C)	21 August 1986	1.80 m (5 ft 11 in)	73 kg (161 lb)	298 cm (117 in)	293 cm (115 in)
10	(Russia) Ekaterina Pankova	2 February 1990	1.78 m (5 ft 10 in)	64 kg (141 lb)	290 cm (110 in)	285 cm (112 in)
11	(Russia) Ekaterina Lyubushkina	2 January 1990	1.88 m (6 ft 2 in)	81 kg (179 lb)	305 cm (120 in)	301 cm (119 in)
12	(Serbia) Aleksandra Crnčević	30 May 1987	1.84 m (6 ft 0 in)	76 kg (168 lb)	304 cm (120 in)	294 cm (116 in)
13	(Russia) Irina Fetisova	7 September 1994	1.90 m (6 ft 3 in)	76 kg (168 lb)	307 cm (121 in)	286 cm (113 in)
15	(Russia) Natalia Khodunova	1 July 1992	1.85 m (6 ft 1 in)	65 kg (143 lb)	305 cm (120 in)	295 cm (116 in)
17	(Dominican Republic) Bethania de la Cruz	13 May 1987	1.88 m (6 ft 2 in)	70 kg (150 lb)	330 cm (130 in)	320 cm (130 in)
18	(Croatia) Maja Poljak	2 May 1983	1.94 m (6 ft 4 in)	80 kg (180 lb)	305 cm (120 in)	300 cm (120 in)
19	(Russia) Anna Malova (L)	16 April 1990	1.75 m (5 ft 9 in)	59 kg (130 lb)	286 cm (113 in)	290 cm (110 in)

=== Rexona-Sesc Rio ===
The following is the roster of the Brazilian club Rexona-Sesc Rio in the 2017 FIVB Volleyball Women's Club World Championship.

Head coach: (Brazil) Bernardo Rezende

No.	Name	Date of birth	Height	Weight	Spike	Block
1	(Brazil) Gabriela Guimarães	19 May 1994	1.76 m (5 ft 9 in)	59 kg (130 lb)	295 cm (116 in)	274 cm (108 in)
2	(Brazil) Mayhara Silva	9 April 1989	1.84 m (6 ft 0 in)	73 kg (161 lb)	320 cm (130 in)	270 cm (110 in)
4	(Brazil) Giovana Gasparini	5 July 1994	1.72 m (5 ft 8 in)	74 kg (163 lb)	281 cm (111 in)	264 cm (104 in)
5	(Brazil) Regiane Bidias (C)	2 October 1986	1.89 m (6 ft 2 in)	74 kg (163 lb)	304 cm (120 in)	286 cm (113 in)
6	(Brazil) Juciely Barreto	18 December 1980	1.84 m (6 ft 0 in)	71 kg (157 lb)	312 cm (123 in)	289 cm (114 in)
7	(Brazil) Camilla Adão	20 June 1984	1.74 m (5 ft 9 in)	64 kg (141 lb)	318 cm (125 in)	298 cm (117 in)
9	(Brazil) Vitória Lage (L)	29 May 1995	1.65 m (5 ft 5 in)	60 kg (130 lb)	230 cm (91 in)	230 cm (91 in)
10	(Brazil) Monique Pavão	31 October 1986	1.78 m (5 ft 10 in)	67 kg (148 lb)	294 cm (116 in)	285 cm (112 in)
11	(Netherlands) Anne Buijs	2 December 1991	1.91 m (6 ft 3 in)	73 kg (161 lb)	317 cm (125 in)	299 cm (118 in)
12	(Brazil) Roberta Ratzke	28 April 1990	1.85 m (6 ft 1 in)	71 kg (157 lb)	287 cm (113 in)	278 cm (109 in)
13	(Brazil) Heloiza Pereira	2 November 1990	1.87 m (6 ft 2 in)	77 kg (170 lb)	305 cm (120 in)	288 cm (113 in)
14	(Brazil) Fabiana Oliveira (L)	7 March 1980	1.69 m (5 ft 7 in)	59 kg (130 lb)	276 cm (109 in)	266 cm (105 in)
15	(Brazil) Ana Carolina da Silva	8 April 1991	1.83 m (6 ft 0 in)	73 kg (161 lb)	290 cm (110 in)	290 cm (110 in)
16	(Brazil) Stephanie Corrêa	15 July 1994	1.88 m (6 ft 2 in)	63 kg (139 lb)	295 cm (116 in)	279 cm (110 in)
17	(Brazil) Drussyla Costa	1 July 1996	1.86 m (6 ft 1 in)	70 kg (150 lb)	310 cm (120 in)	270 cm (110 in)
18	(Brazil) Mikaella Costa	14 June 1997	1.75 m (5 ft 9 in)	77 kg (170 lb)	275 cm (108 in)	270 cm (110 in)

=== Hisamitsu Springs ===
The following is the roster of the Japanese club Hisamitsu Springs Kobe in the 2017 FIVB Volleyball Women's Club World Championship.

- Head coach: (Japan) Shingo Sakai

No.	Name	Date of birth	Height	Weight	Spike	Block
1	(Japan) Ayano Nakaoji	24 July 1991	1.67 m (5 ft 6 in)	61 kg (134 lb)	290 cm (110 in)	275 cm (108 in)
2	(Japan) Chizuru Kotō (C)	8 October 1982	1.71 m (5 ft 7 in)	64 kg (141 lb)	295 cm (116 in)	282 cm (111 in)
3	(Japan) Risa Shinnabe	11 July 1990	1.73 m (5 ft 8 in)	66 kg (146 lb)	295 cm (116 in)	268 cm (106 in)
4	(Japan) Nana Iwasaka	3 July 1990	1.87 m (6 ft 2 in)	72 kg (159 lb)	300 cm (120 in)	285 cm (112 in)
5	(Japan) Yumi Mizuta	30 November 1986	1.81 m (5 ft 11 in)	67 kg (148 lb)	299 cm (118 in)	290 cm (110 in)
6	(Japan) Yuki Ishii	8 May 1991	1.80 m (5 ft 11 in)	68 kg (150 lb)	302 cm (119 in)	286 cm (113 in)
7	(Japan) Risa Ishibashi	3 February 1990	1.78 m (5 ft 10 in)	65 kg (143 lb)	292 cm (115 in)	284 cm (112 in)
8	(Japan) Rika Nomoto	21 September 1991	1.79 m (5 ft 10 in)	70 kg (150 lb)	310 cm (120 in)	279 cm (110 in)
9	(Poland) Maja Tokarska	22 February 1991	1.93 m (6 ft 4 in)	72 kg (159 lb)	325 cm (128 in)	293 cm (115 in)
10	(Japan) Haruka Kanamori	9 April 1996	1.76 m (5 ft 9 in)	66 kg (146 lb)	297 cm (117 in)	290 cm (110 in)
11	(Japan) Erika Sakae	3 April 1991	1.68 m (5 ft 6 in)	53 kg (117 lb)	273 cm (107 in)	267 cm (105 in)
12	(Japan) Yūka Imamura	2 September 1993	1.75 m (5 ft 9 in)	72 kg (159 lb)	295 cm (116 in)	290 cm (110 in)
13	(Japan) Kiyora Obikawa	31 May 1993	1.83 m (6 ft 0 in)	70 kg (150 lb)	298 cm (117 in)	290 cm (110 in)
14	(Japan) Fumika Moriya	7 April 1992	1.80 m (5 ft 11 in)	75 kg (165 lb)	302 cm (119 in)	285 cm (112 in)
15	(Japan) Yuka Taura	28 June 1998	1.62 m (5 ft 4 in)	62 kg (137 lb)	286 cm (113 in)	270 cm (110 in)
16	(Japan) Asuka Hamamatsu	22 December 1998	1.82 m (6 ft 0 in)	67 kg (148 lb)	304 cm (120 in)	302 cm (119 in)
17	(Japan) Hikari Kato	26 August 1997	1.79 m (5 ft 10 in)	75 kg (165 lb)	297 cm (117 in)	282 cm (111 in)
18	(Japan) Mana Toe	18 May 1994	1.63 m (5 ft 4 in)	60 kg (130 lb)	292 cm (115 in)	278 cm (109 in)
19	(Japan) Akane Ukishima	10 June 1996	1.72 m (5 ft 8 in)	66 kg (146 lb)	286 cm (113 in)	273 cm (107 in)
20	(Japan) Sayaka Tsutsui	29 September 1992	1.58 m (5 ft 2 in)	51 kg (112 lb)	255 cm (100 in)	245 cm (96 in)

== Pool B ==
=== Eczacıbaşı VitrA ===
The following is the roster of the Turkish club Eczacıbaşı VitrA İstanbul in the 2017 FIVB Volleyball Women's Club World Championship.

Head coach: (Italy) Massimo Barbolini

No.	Name	Date of birth	Height	Weight	Spike	Block
2	(Turkey) Gülden Kuzubaşıoğlu (L)	5 December 1980	1.67 m (5 ft 6 in)	58 kg (128 lb)	250 cm (98 in)	240 cm (94 in)
3	(Serbia) Tijana Bošković	8 March 1997	1.93 m (6 ft 4 in)	82 kg (181 lb)	310 cm (120 in)	300 cm (120 in)
4	(Turkey) Aybuke Ozdemir	15 June 1996	1.92 m (6 ft 4 in)	67 kg (148 lb)	297 cm (117 in)	290 cm (110 in)
5	(Turkey) Simge Aköz	23 April 1991	1.68 m (5 ft 6 in)	55 kg (121 lb)	250 cm (98 in)	245 cm (96 in)
7	(Turkey) Hande Baladın	11 September 1997	1.89 m (6 ft 2 in)	71 kg (157 lb)	295 cm (116 in)	293 cm (115 in)
8	(United States) Rachael Adams	3 June 1990	1.88 m (6 ft 2 in)	81 kg (179 lb)	318 cm (125 in)	307 cm (121 in)
9	(Turkey) Büşra Kılıçlı	16 July 1990	1.88 m (6 ft 2 in)	84 kg (185 lb)	297 cm (117 in)	291 cm (115 in)
10	(United States) Jordan Larson	16 October 1986	1.87 m (6 ft 2 in)	74 kg (163 lb)	302 cm (119 in)	295 cm (116 in)
11	(Turkey) Nilay Özdemir	24 October 1985	1.79 m (5 ft 10 in)	63 kg (139 lb)	286 cm (113 in)	280 cm (110 in)
14	(Turkey) Gözde Yılmaz	9 September 1991	1.95 m (6 ft 5 in)	78 kg (172 lb)	306 cm (120 in)	299 cm (118 in)
15	(Russia) Tatiana Kosheleva	23 December 1988	1.91 m (6 ft 3 in)	67 kg (148 lb)	315 cm (124 in)	305 cm (120 in)
16	(Turkey) Ceylan Arısan	1 January 1994	1.93 m (6 ft 4 in)	78 kg (172 lb)	305 cm (120 in)	295 cm (116 in)
17	(Turkey) Neslihan Demir (C)	9 December 1983	1.87 m (6 ft 2 in)	72 kg (159 lb)	300 cm (120 in)	290 cm (110 in)
18	(Serbia) Maja Ognjenović	6 August 1984	1.83 m (6 ft 0 in)	67 kg (148 lb)	300 cm (120 in)	293 cm (115 in)

=== Voléro Zürich ===
The following is the roster of the Switzerland's club Voléro Zürich in the 2017 FIVB Volleyball Women's Club World Championship.

Head coach: (Serbia) Zoran Terzić

No.	Name	Date of birth	Height	Weight	Spike	Block
1	(Switzerland) Julie Lengweiler	6 November 1998	1.88 m (6 ft 2 in)	69 kg (152 lb)	305 cm (120 in)	300 cm (120 in)
3	(Brazil) Fabíola de Souza	3 February 1983	1.84 m (6 ft 0 in)	70 kg (150 lb)	300 cm (120 in)	285 cm (112 in)
4	(Serbia) Bojana Živković	29 March 1988	1.86 m (6 ft 1 in)	72 kg (159 lb)	300 cm (120 in)	292 cm (115 in)
5	(Bulgaria) Dobriana Rabadžieva	14 June 1991	1.94 m (6 ft 4 in)	72 kg (159 lb)	305 cm (120 in)	285 cm (112 in)
6	(Switzerland) Gabi Schottroff	8 February 1997	1.92 m (6 ft 4 in)	78 kg (172 lb)	302 cm (119 in)	285 cm (112 in)
7	(Ukraine) Olesia Rykhliuk	11 December 1987	1.96 m (6 ft 5 in)	83 kg (183 lb)	316 cm (124 in)	304 cm (120 in)
8	(Serbia) Silvija Popović (L)	15 March 1986	1.78 m (5 ft 10 in)	65 kg (143 lb)	276 cm (109 in)	266 cm (105 in)
9	(Azerbaijan) Natalya Mammadova (C)	2 December 1984	1.96 m (6 ft 5 in)	78 kg (172 lb)	319 cm (126 in)	302 cm (119 in)
10	(Russia) Irina Malkova	23 March 1989	1.92 m (6 ft 4 in)	80 kg (180 lb)	306 cm (120 in)	294 cm (116 in)
11	(Serbia) Ana Antonijević	26 August 1987	1.85 m (6 ft 1 in)	70 kg (150 lb)	295 cm (116 in)	283 cm (111 in)
12	(Brazil) Mariana Costa	30 July 1986	1.81 m (5 ft 11 in)	73 kg (161 lb)	295 cm (116 in)	283 cm (111 in)
13	(Turkey) Gizem Güreşen Karadayı (L)	14 January 1987	1.78 m (5 ft 10 in)	60 kg (130 lb)	290 cm (110 in)	285 cm (112 in)
14	(Cuba) Kenia Carcaces	22 January 1986	1.90 m (6 ft 3 in)	78 kg (172 lb)	322 cm (127 in)	300 cm (120 in)
15	(Russia) Ekaterina Orlova	21 October 1987	1.93 m (6 ft 4 in)	77 kg (170 lb)	307 cm (121 in)	301 cm (119 in)
16	(United States) Foluke Akinradewo	5 October 1987	1.91 m (6 ft 3 in)	79 kg (174 lb)	331 cm (130 in)	300 cm (120 in)
17	(Switzerland) Laura Unternährer	11 July 1993	1.79 m (5 ft 10 in)	70 kg (150 lb)	303 cm (119 in)	283 cm (111 in)

=== Vôlei Nestlé Osasco ===
The following is the roster of the Brazilian club Vôlei Nestlé Osasco in the 2017 FIVB Volleyball Women's Club World Championship.

Head coach: (Brazil) Luizomar de Moura

No.	Name	Date of birth	Height	Weight	Spike	Block
1	(Brazil) Gabriela Sabino Zeni	1 May 1997	1.80 m (5 ft 11 in)	76 kg (168 lb)	285 cm (112 in)	274 cm (108 in)
2	(Brazil) Carolina Albuquerque	25 July 1977	1.82 m (6 ft 0 in)	76 kg (168 lb)	289 cm (114 in)	279 cm (110 in)
3	(Brazil) Dani Lins	5 January 1985	1.81 m (5 ft 11 in)	68 kg (150 lb)	290 cm (110 in)	276 cm (109 in)
4	(Brazil) Bruna Marques Neri	15 November 1992	0 m (0 in)	0 kg (0 lb)	0 cm (0 in)	0 cm (0 in)
6	(Serbia) Tijana Malešević	18 March 1991	1.85 m (6 ft 1 in)	78 kg (172 lb)	300 cm (120 in)	286 cm (113 in)
8	(Brazil) Ana Paula Borgo	20 October 1993	1.87 m (6 ft 2 in)	76 kg (168 lb)	305 cm (120 in)	290 cm (110 in)
9	(Brazil) Saraelen Lima	16 April 1994	1.84 m (6 ft 0 in)	76 kg (168 lb)	302 cm (119 in)	282 cm (111 in)
10	(Serbia) Ana Bjelica	4 March 1992	1.90 m (6 ft 3 in)	78 kg (172 lb)	310 cm (120 in)	305 cm (120 in)
11	(Brazil) Clarisse Peixoto	1 March 1987	1 m (3 ft 3 in)	74 kg (163 lb)	0 cm (0 in)	0 cm (0 in)
12	(Brazil) Gabriella Souza (C)	14 December 1993	1.75 m (5 ft 9 in)	70 kg (150 lb)	0 cm (0 in)	0 cm (0 in)
13	(Brazil) Natália Martins	12 November 1984	1.85 m (6 ft 1 in)	69 kg (152 lb)	300 cm (120 in)	286 cm (113 in)
16	(Brazil) Tandara Caixeta	30 October 1988	1.84 m (6 ft 0 in)	87 kg (192 lb)	305 cm (120 in)	297 cm (117 in)
19	(Brazil) Tássia Silva (L)	6 March 1988	1.74 m (5 ft 9 in)	66 kg (146 lb)	0 cm (0 in)	0 cm (0 in)
20	(Brazil) Ana Beatriz Corrêa	7 February 1992	1.87 m (6 ft 2 in)	70 kg (150 lb)	298 cm (117 in)	292 cm (115 in)

=== NEC Red Rockets ===
The following is the roster of the Japanese club NEC Red Rockets in the 2017 FIVB Volleyball Women's Club World Championship.

- Head coach: (Japan) Yamada Akinori

No.	Name	Date of birth	Height	Weight	Spike	Block
2	(Japan) Sarina Koga	21 May 1996	1.80 m (5 ft 11 in)	66 kg (146 lb)	305 cm (120 in)	290 cm (110 in)
3	(Bulgaria) Emiliya Nikolova	26 December 1991	1.85 m (6 ft 1 in)	59 kg (130 lb)	302 cm (119 in)	287 cm (113 in)
4	(Japan) Kaname Yamaguchi	6 November 1989	1.70 m (5 ft 7 in)	67 kg (148 lb)	293 cm (115 in)	265 cm (104 in)
5	(Japan) Kana Ōno	30 June 1992	1.80 m (5 ft 11 in)	70 kg (150 lb)	302 cm (119 in)	282 cm (111 in)
6	(Japan) Akari Oumi	10 November 1989	1.71 m (5 ft 7 in)	64 kg (141 lb)	297 cm (117 in)	276 cm (109 in)
7	(Japan) Haruyo Shimamura (C)	4 March 1992	1.82 m (6 ft 0 in)	79 kg (174 lb)	299 cm (118 in)	290 cm (110 in)
8	(Japan) Miku Torigoe	16 October 1992	1.63 m (5 ft 4 in)	58 kg (128 lb)	287 cm (113 in)	268 cm (106 in)
9	(Japan) Rina Sho	17 August 1990	1.64 m (5 ft 5 in)	55 kg (121 lb)	275 cm (108 in)	270 cm (110 in)
10	(Japan) Sayaka Iwasaki	18 July 1990	1.58 m (5 ft 2 in)	52 kg (115 lb)	268 cm (106 in)	250 cm (98 in)
11	(Japan) Kaori Ueno	6 January 1995	1.80 m (5 ft 11 in)	73 kg (161 lb)	293 cm (115 in)	275 cm (108 in)
12	(Japan) Ayana Oyama	13 July 1994	1.77 m (5 ft 10 in)	61 kg (134 lb)	295 cm (116 in)	275 cm (108 in)
13	(Japan) Naoko Yataka	4 December 1991	1.77 m (5 ft 10 in)	69 kg (152 lb)	299 cm (118 in)	273 cm (107 in)
15	(Japan) Mizuki Yanagita	26 March 1996	1.68 m (5 ft 6 in)	64 kg (141 lb)	300 cm (120 in)	290 cm (110 in)
16	(Japan) Yuna Okuyama	26 September 1995	1.70 m (5 ft 7 in)	67 kg (148 lb)	285 cm (112 in)	270 cm (110 in)
18	(Japan) Nanami Hirose	12 May 1997	1.77 m (5 ft 10 in)	61 kg (134 lb)	301 cm (119 in)	295 cm (116 in)
19	(Japan) Misaki Yamauchi	10 March 1995	1.72 m (5 ft 8 in)	69 kg (152 lb)	306 cm (120 in)	290 cm (110 in)
20	(Japan) Shiori Tsukada	7 September 1994	1.74 m (5 ft 9 in)	61 kg (134 lb)	280 cm (110 in)	270 cm (110 in)
21	(Japan) Manami Kojima	7 November 1994	1.58 m (5 ft 2 in)	55 kg (121 lb)	258 cm (102 in)	256 cm (101 in)
22	(Japan) Shiori Aratani	22 September 1998	1.73 m (5 ft 8 in)	60 kg (130 lb)	295 cm (116 in)	290 cm (110 in)
