= Volleyball at the 2020 Summer Olympics – Women's team rosters =

This article shows the roster of all participating teams for the women's indoor volleyball tournament at the 2020 Summer Olympics.

== Pool A ==
=== Brazil ===
The Brazil roster was announced on 26 June 2021.

Head coach: José Roberto Guimarães

- 2 Carol Gattaz MB
- 7 Rosamaria Montibeller OP
- 8 Macris Carneiro S
- 9 Roberta Ratzke S
- 10 Gabriela Guimarães OS
- 11 Tandara Caixeta OP
- 12 Natália Pereira (c) OS
- 15 Ana Carolina da Silva MB
- 16 Fernanda Garay OS
- 17 Ana Cristina de Souza OS
- 18 Camila Brait L
- 20 Ana Beatriz Corrêa MB

=== Dominican Republic ===
The Dominican Republic roster was announced on 10 July 2021.

Head coach: (Brazil) Marcos Kwiek

- 1 Annerys Vargas MB
- 3 Lisvel Elisa Eve MB
- 5 Brenda Castillo L
- 6 Camil Domínguez S
- 7 Niverka Marte S
- 14 Prisilla Rivera (c) OH
- 16 Yonkaira Peña OH
- 18 Bethania de la Cruz OH
- 20 Brayelin Martínez OH
- 21 Jineiry Martínez MB
- 23 Gaila González OP
- 25 Larysmer Martínez L

=== Japan ===
The Japan roster was announced 30 June 2021.

Head coach: Kumi Nakada

- 1 Ai Kurogo OS
- 2 Sarina Koga OS
- 3 Kanami Tashiro S
- 4 Mayu Ishikawa OS
- 5 Haruyo Shimamura MB
- 6 Mako Kobata L
- 8 Yuki Ishii OS
- 9 Mai Okumura MB
- 11 Erika Araki (c) MB
- 12 Aki Momii S
- 15 Kotona Hayashi OS
- 19 Nichika Yamada MB

=== Kenya ===
The Kenya roster was announced on 26 June 2021.

Head coach: (Brazil) Luizomar de Moura

- 1 Jane Wacu S
- 4 Leonida Kasaya OH
- 5 Sharon Chepchumba OP
- 8 Joy Lusenaka S
- 10 Noel Murambi OH
- 12 Gladys Ekaru MB
- 13 Lorine Chebet MB
- 14 Mercy Moim (c) OH
- 15 Pamela Jepkirui OH
- 16 Agripina Kundu L
- 18 Emmaculate Chemtai OP
- 19 Edith Mukuvilani MB

=== Serbia ===
The Serbia following is the Serbian roster.

Head coach: Zoran Terzić

- 1 Bianka Buša OS
- 5 Mina Popović MB
- 8 Slađana Mirković S
- 9 Brankica Mihajlović OS
- 10 Maja Ognjenović (c) S
- 13 Ana Bjelica OP
- 14 Maja Aleksić MB
- 16 Milena Rašić MB
- 17 Silvija Popović L
- 18 Tijana Bošković OP
- 19 Bojana Milenković OS
- 20 Jelena Blagojević OS

=== South Korea ===
The South Korea roster was announced on 4 July 2021.

Head coach: (Italy) Stefano Lavarini

- 1 Lee So-young OS
- 3 Yeum Hye-seon S
- 4 Kim Hee-jin OH
- 7 An Hye-jin S
- 8 Park Eun-jin MB
- 9 Oh Ji-young L
- 10 Kim Yeon-koung (c) OS
- 11 Kim Su-ji MB
- 13 Park Jeong-ah OS
- 14 Yang Hyo-jin MB
- 16 Jeong Ji-yun OP
- 19 Pyo Seung-ju OS

== Pool B ==
=== Argentina ===
The Argentina roster was announced 26 June 2021.

Head coach: Hernán Ferraro

- 1 Elina Rodríguez OS
- 2 Sabrina Germanier S
- 3 Yamila Nizetich OS
- 4 Daniela Bulaich OS
- 6 Eugenia Nosach OP
- 11 Julieta Lazcano (c) MB
- 12 Tatiana Rizzo L
- 13 Bianca Farriol MB
- 14 Victoria Mayer S
- 15 Antonela Fortuna OS
- 16 Erika Mercado OP
- 17 Candelaria Herrera MB

=== China ===
The China following is the Chinese roster.

Head coach: Lang Ping

- 1 Yuan Xinyue MB
- 2 Zhu Ting (c) OS
- 6 Gong Xiangyu OP
- 7 Wang Yuanyuan MB
- 9 Zhang Changning OS
- 10 Liu Xiaotong OS
- 11 Yao Di S
- 12 Li Yingying OS
- 16 Ding Xia S
- 17 Yan Ni MB
- 18 Wang Mengjie L
- 19 Liu Yanhan OS

=== Italy ===
The Italy roster was announced on 5 July 2021.

Head coach: Davide Mazzanti

- 1 Indre Sorokaite OS
- 5 Ofelia Malinov S
- 6 Monica De Gennaro L
- 7 Raphaela Folie MB
- 8 Alessia Orro S
- 9 Caterina Bosetti OS
- 10 Cristina Chirichella MB
- 11 Anna Danesi MB
- 13 Sarah Fahr MB
- 14 Elena Pietrini OS
- 17 Myriam Sylla (c) OS
- 18 Paola Egonu OP

=== ROC ===
The ROC roster was announced on 1 July 2021.

Head coach: (Italy) Sergio Busato

- 4 Daria Pilipenko OH
- 5 Polina Matveeva S
- 6 Irina Koroleva MB
- 8 Natalia Goncharova O
- 10 Arina Fedorovtseva O
- 12 Anna Lazareva O
- 13 Yevgeniya Startseva (c) S
- 14 Irina Fetisova MB
- 16 Irina Voronkova OH
- 19 Anna Podkopaeva L
- 25 Ksenia Smirnova OH
- 26 Ekaterina Enina MB

=== Turkey ===
The Turkey roster was announced on 7 July 2021.

Head coach: (Italy) Giovanni Guidetti

- 2 Simge Aköz L
- 3 Cansu Özbay S
- 4 Tuğba Şenoğlu OS
- 5 Şeyma Ercan OS
- 6 Kübra Akman MB
- 7 Hande Baladın OS
- 9 Meliha İsmailoğlu OS
- 11 Naz Aydemir S
- 13 Meryem Boz OP
- 14 Eda Erdem Dündar (c) MB
- 18 Zehra Güneş MB
- 99 Ebrar Karakurt OP

=== United States ===
The United States roster was announced on 7 June 2021.

Head coach: Karch Kiraly

- 1 Micha Hancock S
- 2 Jordyn Poulter S
- 4 Justine Wong-Orantes L
- 10 Jordan Larson (c) OS
- 11 Annie Drews OP
- 12 Jordan Thompson OP
- 14 Michelle Bartsch-Hackley OS
- 15 Kim Hill OS
- 16 Foluke Akinradewo MB
- 22 Haleigh Washington MB
- 23 Kelsey Robinson OS
- 24 Chiaka Ogbogu MB
