= Sergei Ovchinnikov (volleyball) =

Russian volleyball coach

Personal information
- Full name: Sergei Anatolyevich Ovchinnikov
- Born: 25 January 1969; Komsomolsk-on-Amur, Khabarovsk Krai, Russian SFSR, Soviet Union
- Died: 29 August 2012 (aged 43); Poreč, Croatia
- Hometown: Yaroslavl Russia

Coaching information
Previous teams coached
Years	Teams
1998–2001; 2001–2004; 2004–2006; 2006–2007; 2007–2008; 2008–2009; 2009–2010; 2010–2011; 2011; 2012; 2011–2012	Neftyanik (Yaroslavl); Neftyanik (Ufa); Avtodor-Metar (Chelyabinsk); Dynamo Moscow; Dynamo RGSU; Fakel (Novy Urengoy); Omichka; Dynamo (Krasnodar); Russia women's student team Dynamo Moscow; Russia women's national team

Best results
Years	Location	Result
2009; 2010; 2011; 2011; 2011; 2011; 2012; 2012	Russian Cup; Russian Cup; Russian Cup; CEV Cup; Russian Championship; 2011 Summer Universiade; Russian Championship; 2012 Olympics	(bronze) (silver) (bronze) (silver) (bronze) (bronze) (silver); 5
- Last updated: September 2012

Sergei Anatolyevich Ovchinnikov (Russian: Серге́й Анатольевич Овчинников; 25 January 1969 – 29 August 2012) was the head coach of the Russia's National Women Volleyball Team. He committed suicide three weeks after the team lost to Brazil at the 2012 Summer Olympics quarterfinals.

== Biography ==
Sergei Ovchinnikov was trained at the Sverdlovsk sports boarding school, and later played for several Russian volleyball teams: CSKA-2, SKA (Khabarovsk), Neftyanik (Yaroslavl), Oktan (Novokuybyshevsk) and Neftyanik (Ufa).

Sergei's coaching career began in 1998 when his former teammate Sergei Shlyapnikov invited him to join the coaching staff of Neftyanik (Yaroslavl). As an assistant coach, he was responsible for scouting young players. In 2001, he joined the staff of Neftyanik (Ufa).

On February 15, 2004, Ovchinnikov was appointed head coach of the Avtodor-Metar women's volleyball team in Chelyabinsk. This was his first assignment as a head coach and a change from men's volleyball to women's volleyball. During the 2005–2006 season, Ovchinnikov managed to qualify the Chelyabinsk team for the Super League, and was invited to Dynamo Moscow, the best Russian team at the time, as an assistant coach. Under Ovchinnikov, the team became the champion of Russia in 2006.

The 2007–2008 season saw Ovchinnikov become the head coach again for the Dynamo's farm club – Dynamo RGSU. Under his guidance, the team obtained the best result ever and took third place in the Premier League "A".

The 2008-2009 season which Ovchinnikov spent coaching Fakel (Novy Urengoy) was not a favorable season for him. From the very beginning of the championship, accidental injuries sustained by key players of Fakel constrained them from actively participating in the games until the team left the elite division. Though Ovchinnikov was requested to remain coaching Fakel, he preferred coaching Omichka (Omsk). Before he started working with the Omichka team, Ovchinnikov performed well in the national team as an assistant head coach to Vladimir Kuzyutkin. During the quarterfinal playoffs, Omichka clashed with Dynamo (Krasnodar) and they lost with their rivals winning “bronze” that year under the guidance of Yuri Marichev.

Marichev, at that time, headed both teams from Krasnodar (Men's and Women's) at once. After the end of season, he returned to the men's squad and Sergey Ovchinnikov was offered to head women's team. In the 2010–2011 season, under his guidance, the Krasnodar women's volleyball team won medals in all the tournaments in which it participated: "silver" in the Cup of Russia, "silver" in the CEV Cup and "bronze" in the Russian League.

On 11 February 2012, Ovchinnikov was appointed head coach of Dynamo Moscow. Under his leadership, the team won the silver medal of the Russian Championship 2011/2012.

In 2011 Sergei Ovchinnikov led the student team of Russia, which became the bronze medalist of the World Summer Universiade.

On 21 October 2011 Sergei Ovchinnikov was appointed acting head coach of Russian women's volleyball team. Two months later, on 14 December 2011, Sergei Ovchinnikov was officially confirmed as the head coach of the team. Under his leadership the team took the 1st place in the World Olympic Qualification Tournament, which was held in Tokyo on 19–27 May 2012.

On 29 August 2012, 43-year-old Sergei Ovchinnikov was found dead in his hotel room at his team's training camp in the Croatian town of Poreč. Croatian police, after examining the place of the tragedy, found no evidence of foul play, and concluded that it was a suicide. The reason for the suicide remains unknown, although it was pointed out that Russian media heavily criticized Ovchinnikov for the failure at the Olympic Games in London, where his team was considered as the leading medal contenders but lost in the dramatic quarter-finals to eventual winners Brazil after squandering six match points. Media reports blamed Ovchinnikov's lack of top-level international experience as the main reason for losing to Brazil. "I could see his reaction after that loss," Vladimir Alekno, a head coach of the Russian men's volleyball team, told to the media. "He took it very personally. He was very hard on himself."

On 6 September 2012, Ovchinnikov was buried in his home city of Yaroslavl. Coincidentally, his funeral took place a day before the first anniversary of the 2011 Lokomotiv Yaroslavl plane crash killed the city's hockey team. The Russian Volleyball Federation announced that it would organize a children's tournament in memory of Sergei Ovchinnikov.
