= Ekaterina Efimova =

Russian volleyball player

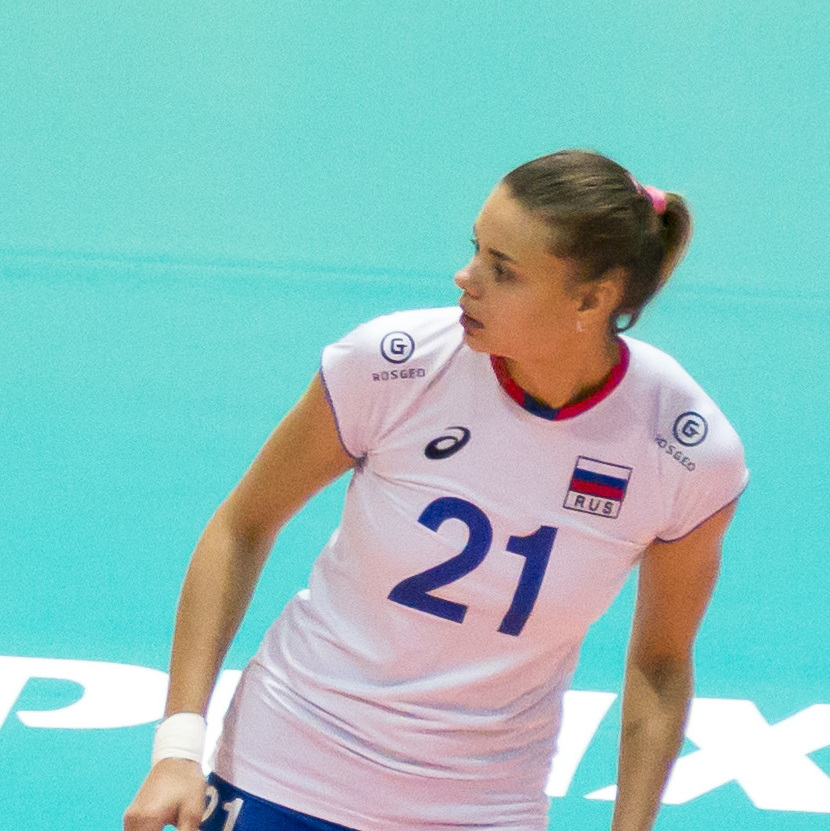

Personal information
- Nationality: Russian
- Born: 3 July 1993 (age 33)
- Height: 1.92 m (6 ft 4 in)
- Weight: 70 kg (154 lb)
- Spike: 305 cm (120 in)
- Block: 292 cm (115 in)

Volleyball information
- Position: Middle-blocker
- Current club: Beşiktaş Ayos
- Number: 13

National team
2015–present	Russia
Honours
Women's volleyball
Representing Russia
World Cup
Bronze medal – third place	2019 Japan

Ekaterina Olegovna Efimova (Russian: Екатерина Олеговна Ефимова; born 3 July 1993) is a Russian volleyball player for Beşiktaş Ayos and the Russian national team.

She participated at the 2017 Women's European Volleyball Championship. and 2018 FIVB Volleyball Women's Nations League.

== National team ==
- 2019 World Cup - Bronze medal (with Russia)

== Clubs ==
- (Russia) Zarechye Odintsovo (2014–2015)
- (Russia) Omichka Omsk (oct 2015–dec 2015)
- (Russia) Dinamo Krasnodar (2015–2016)
- (Russia) Yenisey Krasnoyarsk (2016–2018)
- (Russia) WVC Dynamo Moscow (2018–2021)
- (Russia) Leningradka Saint Petersburg (2021–2023)
- (Turkey) Beşiktaş Ayos (2023–)
