= Podkopayev =

Podkopayev or Podkopaev (Russian: Подкопаев) is a Russian masculine surname, its feminine counterpart is Podkopayeva or Podkopaeva. The surname may refer to the following notable people:

- Anna Podkopayeva (née Malova in 1990), Russian volleyball player
- Lilia Podkopayeva (born 1978), Ukrainian artistic gymnast
- Yekaterina Podkopayeva (born 1952), Russian middle-distance runner
