= Yenisey Krasnoyarsk =

Yenisey Krasnoyarsk may refer to:

- Yenisey Krasnoyarsk (bandy club)
- BC Enisey, men's basketball club
- FC Yenisey Krasnoyarsk, football club
- Yenisey-STM Krasnoyarsk, rugby club
- VC Yenisey Krasnoyarsk, women's volleyball club
