= WVC Dynamo Moscow =

Russian volleyball club

Dinamo Moscow
- Full name: Women's Volleyball Club Dinamo Moscow
- Short name: Dinamo Moscow
- Founded: 1926, 2004
- Ground: Dynamo Sports Palace (Capacity: 3,500)
- Chairman: Evgeni Lovyrev
- Manager: Konstantin Ushakov
- Captain: Nataliya Goncharova
- League: Women's Super League
- 2021–22: 3rd
- Website: Club home page

Uniforms
Home	Away

WVC Dinamo Moscow (Russian: ЖВК Динамо Москва) is a Russian professional women's volleyball club based in Moscow which is currently playing in the Super League. It was established in 1926 and dissolved in 1992, but was reestablished in 2004. It is the most successful team in Soviet women's volleyball history with fourteen Championship titles and the most successful team in the CEV Women's Champions League history with eleven titles.

== History ==
=== Soviet years ===
The club was created in 1926, when Dinamo Moscow decided to establish a women's volleyball section from its sports club. Its first participation in the USSR Championship was 1940, finishing in seventh place. The championship was not held from 1941 until 1944 due to war, but once it resumed in 1945 the club began achieving success under the coach Nikolay Nikolaevich Benderov, winning the titles in 1947, 1951, 1953, 1954 and 1955. During that period the club also won the USSR Cups of 1950, 1951 and 1953.

From 1957 to 1965 the club had a new coach, Serafima Georgievna Kundirenko who took the team to winning the USSR Championships of 1960 and 1962. The introduction of the new premier club competition with clubs from Europe called European Cup (today known as CEV Champions League), provided an opportunity for the club to compete against teams from across the continent. Dynamo Moscow won the inaugural 1960–61 edition, as well as the 1962–63 and 1964–65 editions, establishing itself as one of the strongest women's volleyball clubs in Europe. In 1966, under Anatoly Sergeyevich Sarkisov the team won the 1967–68 European Cup.луЬЙ

Givi Alexandrovich Akhvlediani became the new coach in 1969, with the goal of making Dynamo Moscow the country's leading team. Under his guidance, Dynamo Moscow brought new players (Nina Smoleyeva, Rosa Salikhova, Antonina Ryzhova, Tatyana Tretyakova, Larisa Bergen, Nina Muradyan), employed new tactics and focused on improving technical skills. That lead the club to its most successful period, winning six USSR Championships (1970, 1971, 1972, 1973, 1975, 1977) and seven European Cups (1968–69, 1969–70, 1970–71, 1971–72, 1973–74, 1974–75, 1976–77), making Dynamo Moscow the dominant force in European women's volleyball during the late 60's and 1970's.

The next head coach was Mikhail Omelchenko. By the 1980s Uralochka began to emerge itself as a dominant force, and Dynamo's winning generation team of the 1970s was ageing. Omelchenko rejuvenated the squad calling new players (Lyubov Kozyreva, Nataliya Razumova) who helped the club to win the USSR Cup in 1982 and the USSR Championship in 1983. After social and political changes in the USSR, the club could no longer perform at the highest level being relegated at the conclusion of the 1988–89 season. The club kept on playing in the second division for another three seasons and decided to stop its women's volleyball activities in 1992.

=== Russian years ===
After a 12-year break, the club was re-established on 12 May 2004. It entered the Super League in the 2004–05 season and the team proved to be competitive right away, finishing second that year. The success came shortly after the club won the league in the following two seasons (2005–06 and 2006–07) and a third time in 2008–09. Since then, they won four times the Russian Cup (2009, 2011, 2013 and 2018) in the same time they won the Super League in 2015–16, 2016–17, 2017–18, 2018–19.

The club is yet to emulate the Soviet era success in Europe, but it has reached the finals of the CEV Cup (in 2005–06) and the CEV Champions League twice (in 2006–07 and in 2008–09).

== Honours ==
=== National competitions ===
USSR

- USSR Championship : 14

1947, 1951, 1953, 1954, 1955, 1960, 1962, 1970, 1971, 1972, 1973, 1975, 1977, 1983

- USSR Cup: 4

1950, 1951, 1953, 1982

Russia

- Russian Super League: 8

2005–06, 2006–07, 2008–09, 2015–16, 2016–17, 2017-18, 2018–19, 2022–23

- Russian Cup: 6

2009, 2011, 2013, 2018, 2022, 2023

- Russian Super Cup: 4

2017, 2018, 2021, 2023

=== International competitions ===
- CEV Champions League: 11

1960–61, 1962–63, 1964–65, 1967–68, 1968–69, 1969–70, 1970–71, 1971–72, 1973–74, 1974–75, 1976–77

== Team roster ==
Season 2022–2023, as of June 2022.

Number	Player	Position	Height (m)	Weight (kg)	Birth date
1	(Russia) Mariia Khaletskaya	Opposite Hitter	1.95	78	31 July 1994 (age 31)
2	(Russia) Ekaterina Pipurynova	Outside Hitter	1.88	69	10 February 2000 (age 25)
3	(Russia) Evgeniya Startseva	Setter	1.85	68	12 February 1989 (age 36)
5	(Russia) Tatiana Shchukina	Middle Blocker	1.94	68	7 August 1991 (age 34)
7	(Russia) Tatiana Romanova	Setter	1.82	73	9 September 1994 (age 31)
8	(Russia) Nataliya Goncharova	Opposite Hitter	1.96	74	1 June 1989 (age 36)
9	(Russia) Ekaterina Enina	Middle Blocker	1.92		10 May 1993 (age 32)
10	(Russia) Mariia Bibina	Libero	1.76	62	26 March 1995 (age 30)
11	(Russia) Margarita Kurilo	Outside Hitter	1.85	74	21 June 1993 (age 32)
12	(Brazil) Natalia Pereira	Outside Hitter	1.85	83	4 April 1989 (age 36)
13	(Russia) Irina Fetisova	Middle Blocker	1.90	76	7 September 1994 (age 31)
14	(Russia) Ekaterina Polyakova	Middle Blocker	1.95	70	26 February 1987 (age 38)
19	(Russia) Anna Podkopaeva	Libero	1.75	59	16 April 1990 (age 35)

2021–2022 team
Number	Player	Position	Height (m)	Weight (kg)	Birth date
1	(Russia) Mariia Khaletskaya	Opposite Hitter	1.95	78	31 July 1994 (age 31)
2	(Russia) Ekaterina Pipurynova	Outside Hitter	1.88	69	10 February 2000 (age 25)
3	(Russia) Evgeniya Startseva	Setter	1.85	68	12 February 1989 (age 36)
7	(Russia) Tatiana Romanova	Setter	1.82	73	9 September 1994 (age 31)
8	(Russia) Nataliya Goncharova	Opposite Hitter	1.96	74	1 June 1989 (age 36)
9	(Russia) Ekaterina Enina	Middle Blocker	1.92		10 May 1993 (age 32)
10	(Russia) Mariia Bibina	Libero	1.76	62	26 March 1995 (age 30)
11	(Russia) Ekaterina Lyubushkina	Middle Blocker	1.88	73	2 January 1990 (age 35)
12	(Russia) Anastasia Anufrienko	Setter	1.80		18 February 1993 (age 32)
13	(Russia) Irina Fetisova	Middle Blocker	1.90	76	7 September 1994 (age 31)
14	(Russia) Ekaterina Polyakova	Middle Blocker	1.95	70	26 February 1987 (age 38)
15	(Russia) Natalia Krotkova	Outside Hitter	1.85	69	1 July 1992 (age 33)
16	(Russia) Yaroslava Simonenko	Outside Hitter	1.90		27 June 1996 (age 29)
17	(Russia) Anna Pospelova	Libero	1.73		13 July 1995 (age 30)
18	(Bulgaria) Elitsa Vasileva	Outside Hitter	1.90	73	13 May 1990 (age 35)
19	(Bosnia and Herzegovina) Edina Begić	Outside Hitter	1.85	73	9 October 1992 (age 33)

2020–2021 team
Number	Player	Position	Height (m)	Weight (kg)	Birth date
1	(Russia) Sofya Kuznetsova	Outside Hitter	1.82	65	31 October 1999 (age 25)
2	(Russia) Daria Talysheva	Libero	1.82	62	16 October 1991 (age 34)
3	(Russia) Ekaterina Efimova	Middle-Blocker	1.92	70	3 July 1993 (age 32)
5	(Russia) Ekaterina Orlova	Middle Blocker	1.93	77	21 October 1987 (age 38)
6	(Russia) Yana Shcherban	Outside Hitter	1.87	71	6 September 1989 (age 36)
7	(Russia) Tatiana Romanova	Setter	1.82	73	9 September 1994 (age 31)
8	(Russia) Nataliya Goncharova	Opposite Hitter	1.96	74	1 June 1989 (age 36)
9	(Russia) Ekaterina Enina	Middle Blocker	1.92		10 May 1993 (age 32)
10	(Russia) Mariia Bibina	Libero	1.76	62	26 March 1995 (age 30)
11	(Belarus) Hanna Klimets	Opposite Hitter	1.86	70	14 March 1998 (age 27)
12	(Russia) Marina Babeshina	Setter	1.80	65	26 June 1985 (age 40)
13	(Russia) Irina Fetisova	Middle Blocker	1.90	76	7 September 1994 (age 31)
15	(Russia) Natalia Krotkova	Outside Hitter	1.85	69	1 July 1992 (age 33)
17	(Russia) Anna Pospelova	Outside Hitter	1.73		13 July 1995 (age 30)
18	(Brazil) Natalia Pereira	Outside Hitter	1.85	83	4 April 1989 (age 36)

2018–2019 team
Number	Player	Position	Height (m)	Weight (kg)	Birth date
1	(Russia) Anna Makarova	Outside Hitter	1.94	83	2 April 1984 (age 41)
2	(Russia) Daria Talysheva	Libero	1.82	62	16 October 1991 (age 34)
3	(Russia) Ekaterina Efimova	Middle-Blocker	1.92	70	3 July 1993 (age 32)
5	(Russia) Elena Gendel	Middle-Blocker	1.91	79	21 September 1984 (age 41)
6	(Russia) Yana Shcherban	Outside Hitter	1.87	71	6 September 1989 (age 36)
7	(Russia) Ekaterina Raevskaia	Libero	1.70	65	23 December 1993 (age 31)
8	(Russia) Nataliya Goncharova	Opposite Spiker	1.96	74	1 June 1989 (age 36)
9	(Russia) Daria Stolyarova	Opposite	1.86	79	29 March 1990 (age 35)
11	(Russia) Ekaterina Lyubushkina	Middle Blocker	1.88	73	2 January 1990 (age 35)
12	(Russia) Marina Babeshina	Setter	1.80	65	26 June 1985 (age 40)
13	(Russia) Irina Fetisova	Middle Blocker	1.90	76	7 September 1994 (age 31)
14	(Russia) Anna Lazareva	Opposite	1.90	70	31 January 1997 (age 28)
15	(Russia) Natalia Krotkova	Outside Hitter	1.85	69	1 July 1992 (age 33)
16	(Czech Republic) Helena Havelkova	Outside Hitter	1.88	70	25 July 1988 (age 37)
18	(Serbia) Maja Ognjenović	Setter	1.83	67	6 August 1984 (age 41)

2017–2018 team
Number	Player	Position	Height (m)	Weight (kg)	Birth date
1	(Russia) Yulia Morozova	Middle Blocker	1.92	79	8 January 1985 (age 40)
3	(Russia) Anastasia Bavykina	Outside Hitter	1.88	73	6 July 1992 (age 33)
5	(Russia) Anastasia Markova	Outside Hitter	1.90	71	16 October 1987 (age 38)
6	(Russia) Yana Shcherban	Outside Hitter	1.87	71	6 September 1989 (age 36)
7	(Russia) Ekaterina Romanenko	Libero	1.70	62	23 December 1993 (age 31)
8	(Russia) Nataliya Goncharova	Opposite Spiker	1.96	74	1 June 1989 (age 36)
9	(Russia) Vera Vetrova	Setter	1.82	73	21 August 1986 (age 39)
10	(Russia) Ekaterina Kosianenko (c)	Setter	1.75	64	2 February 1990 (age 35)
11	(Russia) Ekaterina Lyubushkina	Middle Blocker	1.88	73	2 January 1990 (age 35)
12	(Serbia) Aleksandra Crnčević	Outside Hitter	1.84	76	30 May 1987 (age 38)
13	(Russia) Irina Fetisova	Middle Blocker	1.90	76	7 September 1994 (age 31)
17	(Dominican Republic) Bethania de la Cruz	Outside Hitter	1.88	68	13 May 1987 (age 38)
18	(Croatia) Maja Poljak	Middle Blocker	1.94	73	2 May 1983 (age 42)
19	(Russia) Anna Malova	Libero	1.75	59	16 April 1990 (age 35)

2016–2017 team
Number	Player	Position	Height (m)	Weight (kg)	Birth date
1	(Russia) Yulia Morozova	Middle Blocker	1.92	79	8 January 1985 (age 40)
3	(Russia) Anastasia Bavykina	Outside Hitter	1.88	73	6 July 1992 (age 33)
5	(Russia) Anastasia Markova	Outside Hitter	1.90	71	16 October 1987 (age 38)
6	(Russia) Yana Shcherban	Outside Hitter	1.87	71	6 September 1989 (age 36)
7	(Russia) Ekaterina Romanenko	Libero	1.70	62	23 December 1993 (age 31)
8	(Russia) Nataliya Goncharova	Opposite Spiker	1.96	74	1 June 1989 (age 36)
9	(Russia) Vera Vetrova	Setter	1.82	73	21 August 1986 (age 39)
10	(Russia) Ekaterina Kosianenko (c)	Setter	1.75	64	2 February 1990 (age 35)
11	(Russia) Ekaterina Lyubushkina	Middle Blocker	1.88	73	2 January 1990 (age 35)
12	(Serbia) Aleksandra Crnčević	Outside Hitter	1.84	76	30 May 1987 (age 38)
13	(Russia) Irina Fetisova	Middle Blocker	1.90	76	7 September 1994 (age 31)
17	(Dominican Republic) Bethania de la Cruz	Outside Hitter	1.88	68	13 May 1987 (age 38)
18	(Croatia) Maja Poljak	Middle Blocker	1.94	73	2 May 1983 (age 42)
19	(Russia) Anna Malova	Libero	1.75	59	16 April 1990 (age 35)

== Notable players ==
- (Soviet Union) Larisa Bergen
- (Soviet Union) Lyudmila Buldakova
- (Soviet Union) Aleksandra Chudina
- (Soviet Union) Marita Katusheva
- (Soviet Union) Irina Kirillova
- (Soviet Union) Liliya Konovalova
- (Soviet Union) Lyubov Kozyreva
- (Soviet Union) Tatyana Kraynova
- (Soviet Union) Nina Muradyan
- (Soviet Union) Nataliya Razumova
- (Soviet Union) Antonina Ryzhova
- (Soviet Union) Rosa Salikhova
- (Soviet Union) Lyudmila Shchetinina
- (Soviet Union) Nina Smoleyeva
- (Soviet Union) Tatyana Tretyakova
- (Soviet Union) Zoya Yusova
- (Russia) Ekaterina Gamova
- (Russia) Elena Godina
- (Russia) Nataliya Goncharova
- (Russia) Tatiana Kosheleva
- (Russia) Svetlana Kryuchkova
- (Russia) Yulia Merkulova
- (Russia) Maria Perepelkina
- (Russia) Natalia Safronova
- (Russia) Irina Tebenikhina
- (Russia) Anastasiya Kodirova
- (Russia) Tatiana Gratcheva
- (Russia) Marina Sheshenina
- (Russia) Maria Borodakova
- (Russia) Lesya Makhno
- (Russia) Anna Podkopaeva
- (Russia) Irina Fetisova
- (Russia) Evgeniya Startseva
- (Azerbaijan) Oksana Parkhomenko
- (Brazil) Fernanda Garay
- (Brazil) Natalia Pereira
- (Croatia) Nataša Osmokrović
- (Croatia) Maja Poljak
- (Croatia) Sanja Popovic
- (Cuba) Yaima Ortiz
- (Germany) Angelina Grün
- (Italy) Carolina Costagrande
- (Italy) Simona Gioli
- (Dominican Republic) Bethania de la Cruz
- (United States) Logan Tom
- (Serbia) Maja Ognjenović
- (Czech Republic) Helena Havelkova
- (Bulgaria) Elitsa Vasileva
