= Soviet Women's Volleyball Cup =

Sports competition 1950–1953, 1972–1991

Soviet Union Cup
- Sport: Volleyball
- Founded: 1950
- First season: 1950
- Folded: 1991
- Administrator: USRRV
- Country: Soviet Union
- Continent: Europe

The USSR Women's Volleyball Cup in ( Russian : Кубок СССР по волейболу среди женщин ) was a competition of the USSR women's volleyball teams, and it was contested first from 1950 to 1953, then from 1972 to 1991. The competition did not take place during the 1975 and 1979 seasons .

== Cup editions ==
Years	Winners	Score	Runners-up
1950	Dynamo Moscow		Spartak Leningrad
1951	Dynamo Moscow		Lokomotiv Moscow
1952	Lokomotiv Moscow		Spartak Leningrad
1953	Dynamo Moscow		Spartak Leningrad
1954-71	Not Played		
1972	CSKA Moscow		Avtomobilist Tachkent
1973	Burevestnik Leningrad		Lokomotiv Moscow
1974	Medin Odessa		BMKZ Bakı
1975	Not Played		
1976	Spartak Leningrad		Ouralotchka Sverdlovsk
1977	Spartak Leningrad		CSKA Moscow
1978	Avtomobilist Tachkent		Dynamo Moscow
1979	Not Played		
1980	Iskra Vorochilovgrad		Orbita Zaporijia
1981	Medin Odessa		Dynamo Moscow
1982	Dynamo Moscow		CSKA Moscow
1983	Medin Odessa		ADK Alma-Ata
1984	CSKA Moscow		
1985	Orbita Zaporijia		Dynamo Moscow
1986	Ouralotchka Sverdlovsk		
1987	Ouralotchka Sverdlovsk		ADK Alma-Ata
1988	Ouralotchka Sverdlovsk II		TTU Spartak Leningrad
1989	Ouralotchka Sverdlovsk		Ouralotchka Sverdlovsk II
1990	ADK Alma-Ata		
1991	BMKZ Bakı		

== See also ==
- Volleyball in Russia
- Russian Women's Volleyball Cup
