= Natalia Alimova =

Russian volleyball player (born 1978)

Personal information
- Nationality: Russia
- Born: 9 December 1978 (age 47); Saint Petersburg, Russian SFSR
- Height: 1.89 m (6 ft 2 in)
- Weight: 78 kg (172 lb)
- Spike: 315 cm (124 in)
- Block: 308 cm (121 in)

Volleyball information
- Number: 8

National team
2005—2008	Russia
Honours
European Volleyball Championship
Bronze medal – third place	2005 Zagreb-Pula	Team
Bronze medal – third place	2007	Team competition

Natalia Adamovna Alimova (Russian: Наталья Амировна Алимова, born 6 February 1978), is a volleyball player from Russia.

She played for the Russia women's national volleyball team. She participated in the 2005 Women's European Volleyball Championship, and 2007 Women's European Volleyball Championship.

== Clubs ==
Club	From	To
Russia TTU Saint-Pétersbourg	1995–1996	1996–1997
Russia Ecran Saint-Pétersbourg	1997–1998	1997–1998
Russia TTU Saint-Pétersbourg	1998–1999	2000–2001
Russia MGFSO Moscou	2001–2002	2001–2002
Italy Johnson Matthey Spezzano	2002–2003	2002–2003
Russia Leningradka	2003–2004	2010–2011
Russia Zaretchie Odintsovo	2011–2012	2011–2012
Russia Fakel Novy Ourengoï	2012–2013	2013–2014
Russia Leningradka	2015–2016	2015–2016
