= 1964–65 Volleyball Women's European Cup =

The 1963–64 Volleyball Women's European Cup was the fifth edition of the official competition for European women's volleyball national champions. It was contested by 16 teams, six more than the previous edition, with Israel and Switzerland debuting, so a Round of 16 could be held for the first time. Dynamo Moscow defeated defending champion Levski Sofia in the semifinals and Dynamo Berlin in the final to win its third title.

== Round of 16 ==
Team #1	Agg.	Team #2	1st	2nd
SC Dynamo Berlin (East Germany)	6–1	(Bulgaria) Slavia Sofia	3–0	3–1
Blau-Geld Wien (Austria)	0–6	(Poland) AZS-AWF Warsaw	0–3	0–3
Dinamo Bucharest (Romania)	6–0	(Turkey) Galatasaray	3–0	3–0
Uni Basel (Switzerland)	0–6	(Hungary) Újpest Dósza	0–3	0–3
Red Star Belgrade (Socialist Federal Republic of Yugoslavia)	0–6	(Soviet Union) Dynamo Moscow	0–3	0–3
ČKD Praha (Czech Republic)	6–1	(Germany) 1. VC Hannover	3–0	3–1
ASU Lyon (France)	?–?	(Portugal) Sporting Espinho	3–0	?–?
Hapoel Kfar Masaryk (Israel)	0–6	(Bulgaria) Levski Sofia	0–3	0–3

== Quarterfinals ==
Team #1	Agg.	Team #2	1st	2nd
Dynamo Berlin (East Germany)	5–3	(Poland) AZS-AWF Warsaw	3–0	2–3
Dinamo Bucharest (Romania)	4–3	(Hungary) Újpest Dózsa	3–0	1–3
Dynamo Moscow (Soviet Union)	6–0	(Czech Republic) CKD Prague	3–0	3–0
ASU Lyon (France)	0–6	(Bulgaria) Levski Sofia	0–3	0–3

== Semifinals ==
Team #1	Agg.	Team #2	1st	2nd
Dynamo Berlin (East Germany)	4–3	(Romania) Dinamo Bucharest	3–0	1–3
Dynamo Moscow (Soviet Union)	4–3	(Bulgaria) Levski Sofia	3–0	1–3

== Final ==
Team #1	Agg.	Team #2	1st	2nd
SC Dynamo Berlin (East Germany)	0–6	(Soviet Union) Dynamo Moscow	0–3	0–3

Women's Volleyball European Cup
1962-63 Champions
(Soviet Union) Dynamo Moscow
Third title
