= Jeon Sae-yan =

South Korean volleyball player (born 1997)

Personal information
- Nationality: South Korean
- Born: 27 November 1996 (age 29); Gyeongsangnam-do
- Height: 177 cm (70 in)
- Weight: 67 kg (148 lb)
- Spike: 220 cm (87 in)
- Block: 210 cm (83 in)

Volleyball information
- Position: Outside hitter
- Number: 4

Career
Years	Teams
2014-2016	Hwaseong IBK Altos
2016-present	Korea Expressway Corporation

National team
2017	South Korea

Jeon Sae-yan (born 27 November 1996) is a South Korean female volleyball player. She is part of the South Korea women's national volleyball team.

== Career ==
She participated at the 2017 FIVB Volleyball Women's World Grand Champions Cup.

== Clubs ==
- (South Korea) Hwaseong IBK Altos, 2014-2016
- (South Korea) Korea Expressway Corporation, 2017–present
