= Yana Shcherban =

Russian volleyball player

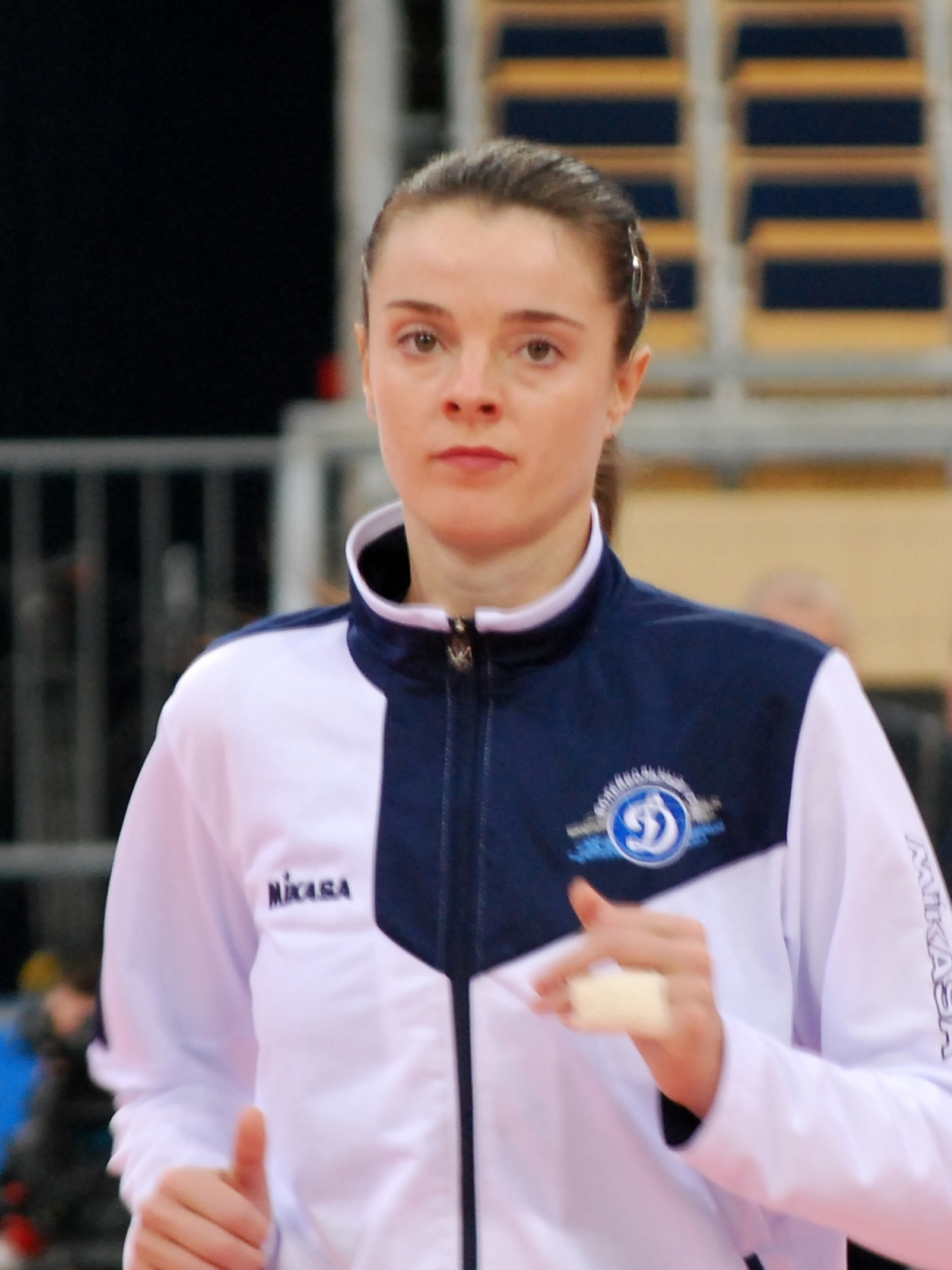

Personal information
- Full name: Yana Valerievna Shcherban
- Nationality: Russian
- Born: 6 September 1989 (age 37) Frunze, Kirghiz SSR, Soviet Union
- Height: 1.85 m (6 ft 1 in)
- Weight: 71 kg (157 lb)
- Spike: 350 cm (138 in)
- Block: 310 cm (122 in)

Volleyball information
- Position: Outside hitter
- Current club: Jakarta Pertamina Enduro
- Number: 6

Career
- Years: Team
- 2005–2007 2007–2008 2008–2012 2012–2014 2014–2021 2021–2022 2022 2022–2023 2023–2024 2024 2025–: AES Balakovo; Universitet Vizit; AES Balakovo / Proton Balakovo; Dinamo Krasnodar; Dinamo Moscow; Casalmaggiore; Lokomotiv Kaliningrad; Pallavolo Scandicci; Trentino; Talmassons; Jakarta Pertamina Enduro

National team
- Years: Team
- 2014–: Russia
Honours
Women's volleyball
Representing Russia
World Grand Prix
Silver medal – second place	2009 Tokyo
Silver medal – second place	2015 Omaha
Bronze medal – third place	2014 Tokyo
European Championship
Gold medal – first place	2015 Netherlands/Belgium
Summer Universiade
Bronze medal – third place	2011 Shenzhen	Team

Yana Valerievna Shcherban (Russian: Яна Валерьевна Щербань, born 6 September 1989) is a Russian volleyball player, who plays as an outside hitter. She is a member of the Russia women's national volleyball team and participated at the 2011 Summer Universiade in China, the 2014 Montreux Volley Masters, the FIVB Volleyball World Grand Prix (in 2009, 2014, 2015, 2016), the 2014 FIVB Volleyball Women's World Championship in Italy, the 2015 Women's European Volleyball Championship in Belgium and the Netherlands, the 2015 FIVB Volleyball Women's World Cup in Japan, and the 2016 Summer Olympics in Brazil.

At club level she played for AES Balakovo, Universitet Vizit, Proton Balakovo and Dinamo Krasnodar before moving to Dinamo Moscow in 2014.

== Awards ==
=== Individuals ===
- 2014 Montreux Volley Masters "Best Receiver"

=== National team ===
==== Junior ====
- 2011 Universiade – Bronze medal

==== Senior ====
- 2009 FIVB World Grand Prix – Silver medal
- 2014 Montreux Volley Masters – Bronze medal
- 2014 FIVB World Grand Prix – Bronze medal
- 2015 FIVB World Grand Prix – Silver medal
- 2015 European Championship – Gold medal

=== Clubs ===
- 2012–13 CEV Challenge Cup – Gold medal (with Dinamo Krasnodar)
- 2014–15 Russian Championship – Silver medal (with Dinamo Moscow)
- 2015–16 Russian Championship – Gold medal (with Dinamo Moscow)
- 2016 Russian Cup – Silver medal (with Dinamo Moscow)
- 2016–17 Russian Championship – Gold medal (with Dinamo Moscow)
