= Maria Frolova =

Russian volleyball player

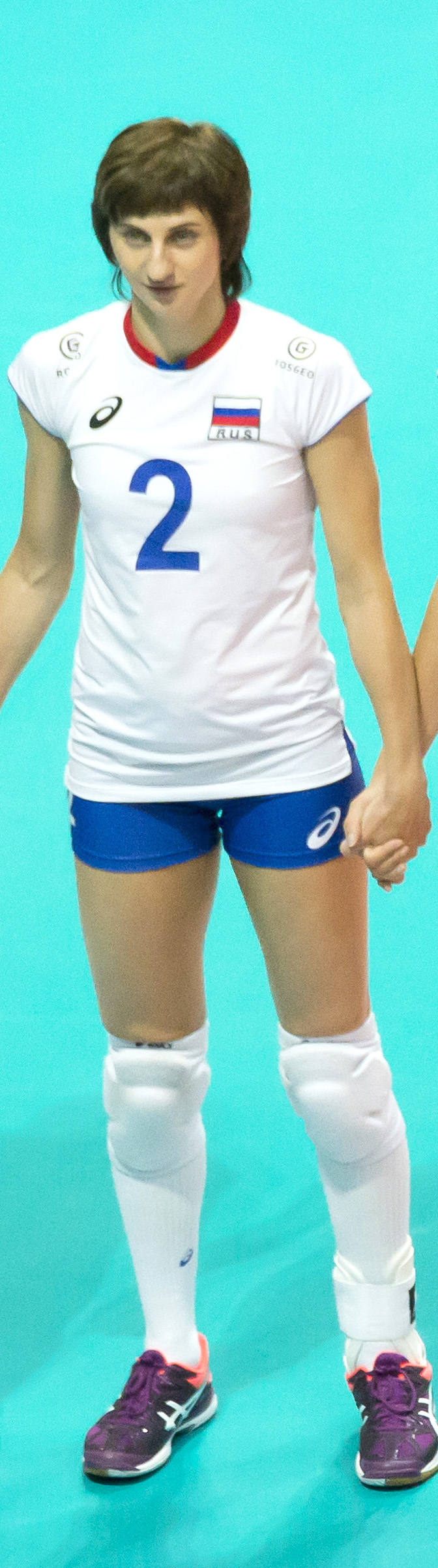

Personal information
- Nationality: Russian
- Born: 1 November 1986 (age 39); Orenburg, Russia
- Height: 1.78 m (5 ft 10 in)
- Weight: 62 kg (137 lb)
- Spike: 297 cm (117 in)
- Block: 289 cm (114 in)

Volleyball information
- Position: Wing Spiker (Outside Hitter) / libero
- Current club: VC Yenisey Krasnoyarsk
- Number: 9

National team
Russia

Maria Frolova (Russian: Мария Фролова) (born 1 November 1986) is a Russian volleyball player for VC Yenisey Krasnoyarsk and the Russian national team.

She participated at the 2017 Women's European Volleyball Championship, and the 2017 FIVB Volleyball World Grand Prix, and 2017 FIVB Volleyball Women's World Grand Champions Cup.
