= Vera Ulyakina =

Russian volleyball player

Vera Vetrova
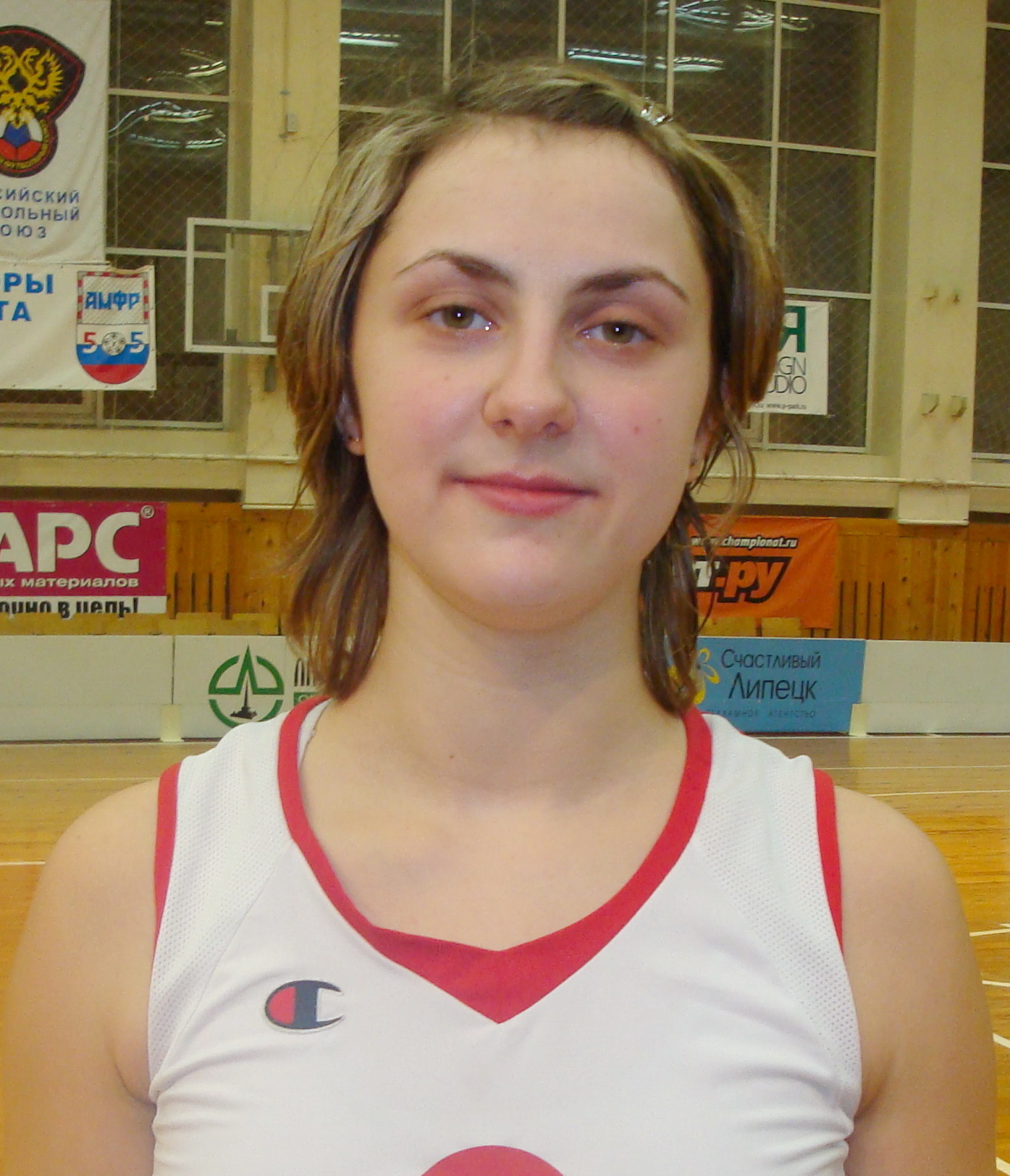

Personal information
- Full name: Vera Alexandrovna Vetrova (Ulyakina)
- Nationality: Russia
- Born: 21 August 1986 (age 40) Gorky, Russian SFSR, Soviet Union
- Height: 1.80 m (5 ft 11 in)
- Weight: 73 kg (161 lb)
- Spike: 298 cm (117 in)
- Block: 293 cm (115 in)

Volleyball information
- Position: Setter
- Current club: Dynamo Moscow
- Number: 9 (club and national team)

National team
- Years: Team
- 2010–2017: Russia
Honours
Women's volleyball
Representing Russia
World Championship
| Gold medal – first place | 2010 Japan | Team |
- Updated on 20 January 2017

Vera Alexandrovna Vetrova, née Ulyakina (Russian: Ве́ра Алекса́ндровна Ве́трова, born 21 August 1986 in Gorky) is a Russian volleyball player. She was a member of the Russia women's national volleyball team at the 2010 FIVB Women's World Championship in Japan, the 2011 FIVB Volleyball World Grand Prix in China, the 2011 Women's European Volleyball Championship in Italy and Serbia, and the 2016 Summer Olympics in Rio de Janeiro.

At club level, she played for Indesit (then called Stinol) and Dinamo Kazan before joining Dinamo Moscow in 2011.

== Personal life ==
She is married to Andrey Vetrov and due to her pregnancy she was out on maternity leave for most of 2012 and early 2013. On 1 November 2012 she gave birth to a boy named Nikolay.

== Clubs ==
- (Russia) Stinol Lipetsk (2002–2009)
- (Russia) Dinamo Kazan (2009–2011)
- (Russia) Dynamo Moscow (2011–present)

== Awards ==
=== Senior ===
- 2010 FIVB World Championship – Gold medal

=== Clubs ===
- 2010 Russian Cup – Gold medal (with Dinamo Kazan)
- 2010–11 Russian Championship – Gold medal (with Dinamo Kazan)
- 2011 Russian Cup – Gold medal (with Dinamo Moscow)
- 2011–12 Russian Championship – Silver medal (with Dinamo Moscow)
- 2013 Russian Cup – Gold medal (with Dinamo Moscow)
- 2013–14 Russian Championship – Silver medal (with Dinamo Moscow)
- 2014–15 Russian Championship – Silver medal (with Dinamo Moscow)
- 2015–16 Russian Championship – Gold medal (with Dinamo Moscow)
- 2016 Russian Cup – Silver medal (with Dinamo Moscow)
- 2016–17 Russian Championship – Gold medal (with Dinamo Moscow)
