= Iuliia Morozova =

Russian volleyball player (born 1985)

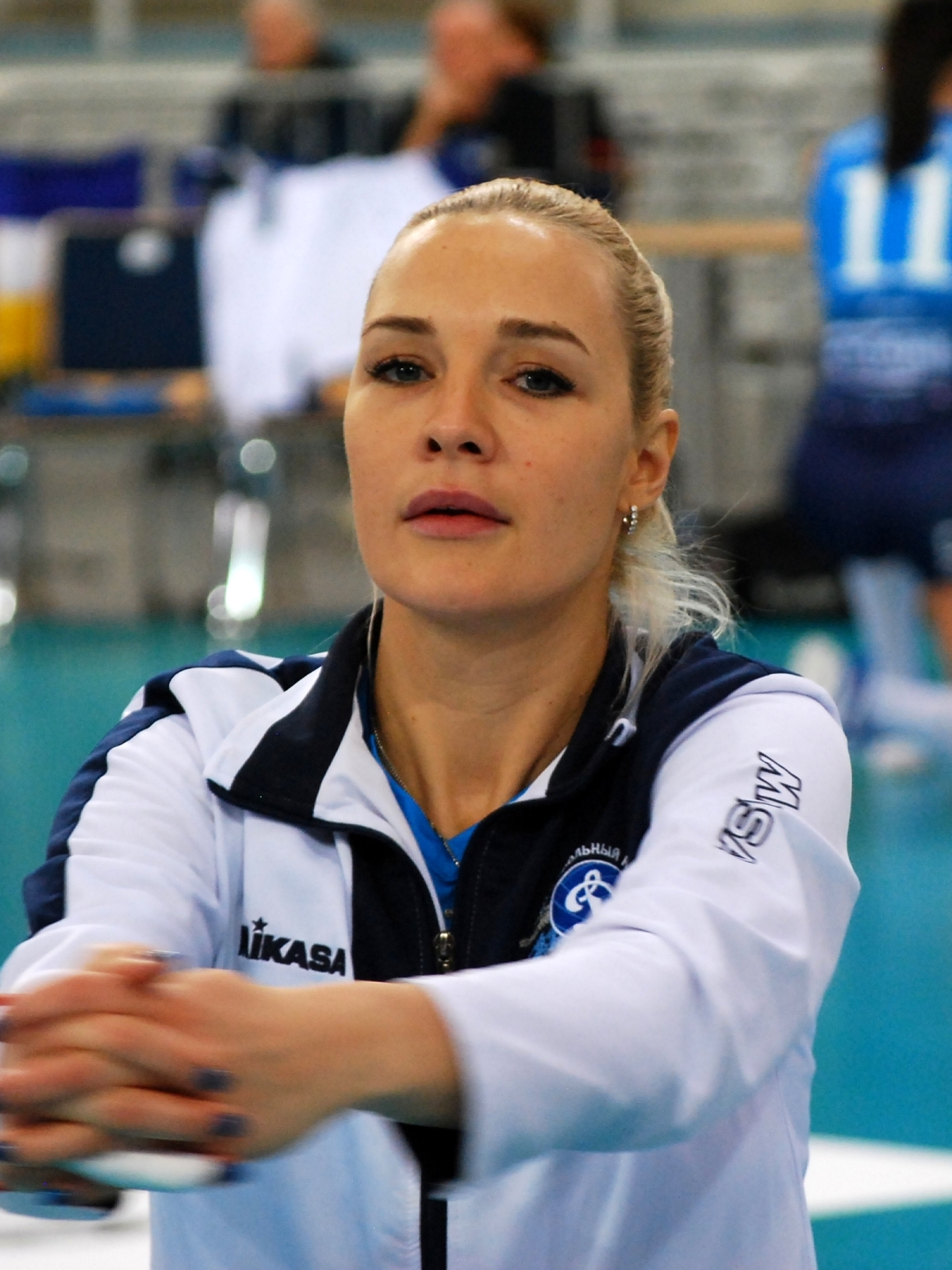

Personal information
- Nationality: Russia
- Born: January 8, 1985 (age 41); Chelyabinsk, Soviet Union
- Height: 1.92 m (6 ft 3 1/2 in)
- Weight: 79 kg (174 lb)

Volleyball information
- Current club: Dynamo Moscow

Career
Years	Teams
2000–11; 2011–	Avtodor-Metar; Dynamo Moscow

National team
2007–2013	Russia
Honours
European Championship
Gold medal – first place	2013 Germany	Team
Bronze medal – third place	2007 Charleroi-Luxembourg	Team
World Grand Prix
Silver medal – second place	2009 Japan	Team

Iuliia Morozova (Russian: Юлия Константиновна Морозова; born 8 January 1985, in Chelyabinsk) is a Russian volleyball player.

== Career ==
Morozova won the Best Spiker individual award in the 2011 FIVB World Grand Prix where her home national team ended up in fourth place.

== Clubs ==
- (Russia) Avtodor-Metar (2003–2011)
- (Russia) Dynamo Moscow (2011–present)

== Awards ==
=== Individual ===
- 2011 World Grand Prix "Best Blocker"
- 2013 World Grand Champions Cup - "Best Middle Blocker"

Awards
Preceded by (United States) Foluke Akinradewo	Best Blocker of FIVB World Grand Prix; 2011	Succeeded by (Brazil) Thaísa Menezes
