= Ekaterina Lyubushkina =

Russian volleyball player (born 1990)

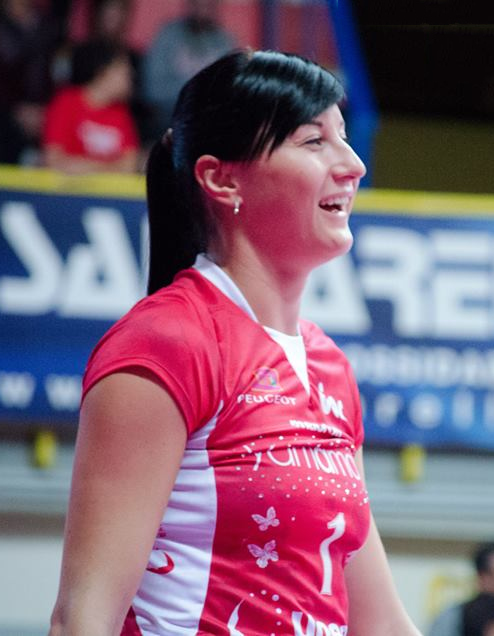
- Lyubushkina in 2014

Personal information
- Full name: Ekaterina Olegovna Lyubushkina
- Nationality: Russian
- Born: 2 January 1990 (age 36); Volgograd, Russia
- Height: 1.88 m (6 ft 2 in)
- Weight: 81 kg (179 lb)
- Spike: 305 cm (120 in)
- Block: 301 cm (119 in)

Volleyball information
- Position: middle blocker

Career
Teams
	Zarechie Odintsovo (2006–13); Fakel (2013–14); Futura Volley Busto Arsizio (2014–15); WVC Dynamo Moscow (2015–)

National team
2010–	Russia
Honours
Women's volleyball
Representing Russia
European Championships
Gold medal – first place	2015 Netherlands/Belgium	Team

Ekaterina Olegovna Lyubushkina (Russian: Екатерина Олеговна Любушкина, née Bogacheva; born 2 January 1990) is a Russian volleyball player. She was part of the Russia women's national volleyball team that won the European title in 2015.
