= Choi Su-bin (volleyball) =

South Korean volleyball player (born 1994)

Personal information
- Nationality: South Korean
- Born: 2 April 1994 (age 32); Seoul
- Height: 175 cm (69 in)
- Weight: 64 kg (141 lb)
- Spike: 276 cm (109 in)
- Block: 269 cm (106 in)

Volleyball information
- Position: Wing spiker
- Number: 19

Career
Years	Teams
2017	KGC Sports Club

National team
2017-	South Korea

Choi Su-bin (born 2 April 1994) is a South Korean female volleyball player. She is part of the South Korea women's national volleyball team.

== Career ==
She participated in the 2017 FIVB Volleyball Women's World Grand Champions Cup.

== Clubs ==
- (South Korea) KGC Sports Club, 2017
