= Ekaterina Evdokimova =

Russian volleyball player

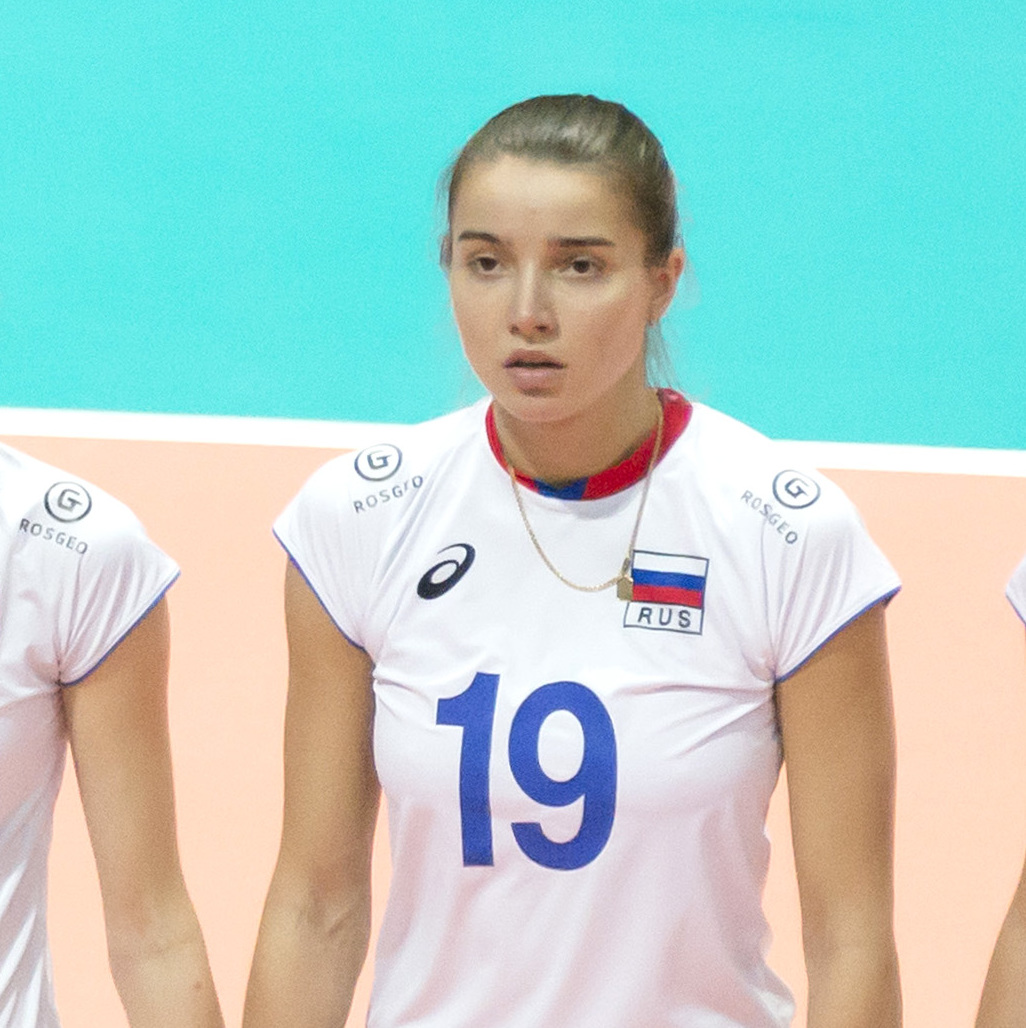

Personal information
- Nationality: Russian
- Born: 10 September 1994 (age 32)
- Height: 1.90 m (6 ft 3 in)
- Weight: 73 kg (161 lb)
- Spike: 306 cm (120 in)
- Block: 285 cm (112 in)

Volleyball information
- Position: Middle-blocker
- Current club: VC Uralochka-NTMK
- Number: 10

National team
Russia

Ekaterina Evdokimova (born 10 September 1994) is a Russian volleyball player for VC Uralochka-NTMK and the Russian national team.

She participated at the 2017 Women's European Volleyball Championship.
