= Irina Fetisova (volleyball) =

Russian volleyball player

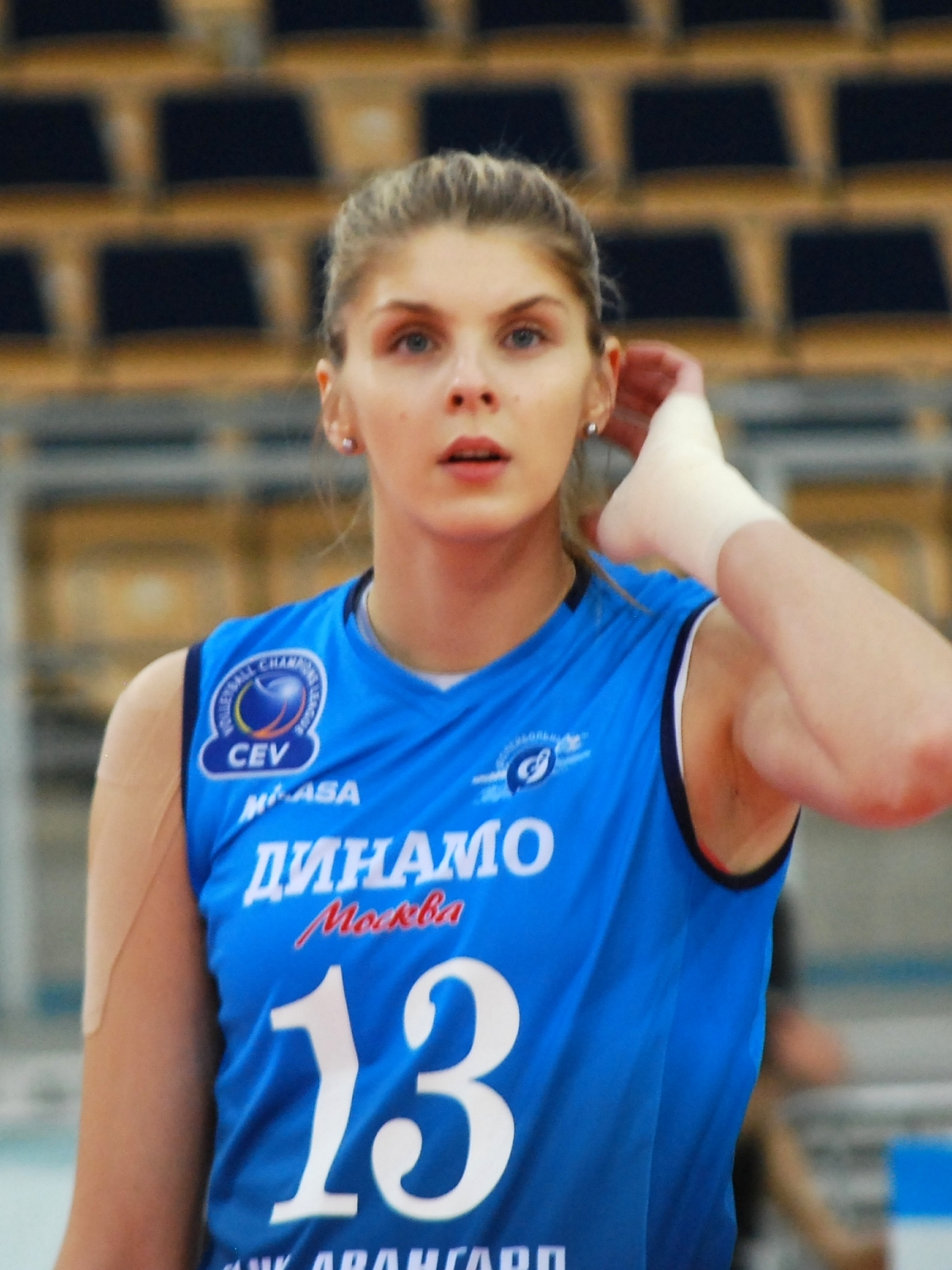

Personal information
- Full name: Irina Andreyevna Fetisova
- Nationality: Russian
- Born: 7 September 1994 (age 32) Valladolid, Spain
- Home town: Saint Petersburg
- Height: 1.90 m (6 ft 3 in)
- Weight: 76 kg (168 lb)
- Spike: 307 cm (121 in)
- Block: 286 cm (113 in)

Volleyball information
- Position: Middle blocker
- Current club: Tianjin Bohai Bank
- Number: 4

Career
- Years: Team
- 2009–2011 2011–2015 2015–2023 2023-2024 2024-: Leningradka Saint Petersburg; Zarechie Odintsovo; Dinamo Moscow; Fenerbahce Opet; Tianjin Bohai Bank

National team
- Years: Team
- 2014–: Russia
Honours
Women's volleyball
Representing Russia
World Grand Prix
Silver medal – second place	2015 Omaha
Bronze medal – third place	2014 Tokyo
European Championship
Gold medal – first place	2015 Netherlands/Belgium

Irina Andreyevna Fetisova (Russian: Ирина Андреевна Фетисова, born 7 September 1994) is a Russian volleyball player. She plays for the Russia women's national volleyball team and Tianjin Bohai Bank at club level.

== Career ==
Fetisova played for the Russia women's national volleyball team at junior and senior level and was part of the teams at the 2014 Montreux Volley Masters, the FIVB Volleyball World Grand Prix (in 2014, 2015, 2016), the 2015 Women's European Volleyball Championship, the 2014 FIVB Volleyball Women's World Championship in Italy, the 2015 FIVB Volleyball Women's World Cup in Japan, and the 2016 Summer Olympics in Rio de Janeiro.

At club level, she played for Leningradka and Zarechie Odintsovo before moving to Dinamo Moscow in 2015.

== Personal life ==
Fetisova is the daughter of former professional basketball player Andrei Fetisov who was playing for a club in Valladolid when she was born.

== Awards ==
=== Individuals ===
- 2013 FIVB Women's Junior World Championship – "Best Midder Blocker"
- 2014 FIVB World Grand Prix – "Best Midder Blocker"

=== National team ===
==== Senior ====
- 2014 Montreux Volley Masters – Bronze medal
- 2014 FIVB World Grand Prix – Bronze medal
- 2015 FIVB World Grand Prix – Silver medal
- 2015 European Championship – Gold medal

=== Clubs ===
- 2013–14 CEV Challenge Cup – Gold medal (with Zarechie Odintsovo)
- 2015–16 Russian Championship – Gold medal (with Dinamo Moscow)
- 2016 Russian Cup – Silver medal (with Dinamo Moscow)
- 2016–17 Russian Championship – Gold medal (with Dinamo Moscow)
- 2023–24 Turkish Volleyball Cup Champion, with Fenerbahçe Opet
- 2024 FIVB Volleyball Women's Club World Championship – Silver medal (with Tianjin Bohai Bank)

Awards
Preceded by (Brazil) Thaísa Menezes and (Serbia) Milena Rašić	Best Middle Blocker of FIVB World Grand Prix; 2014 (with (Brazil) Fabiana Claudino)	Succeeded by (Brazil) Juciely Barreto and (United States) Christa Harmotto
