= Ekaterina Enina =

Russian volleyball player (born 1993)

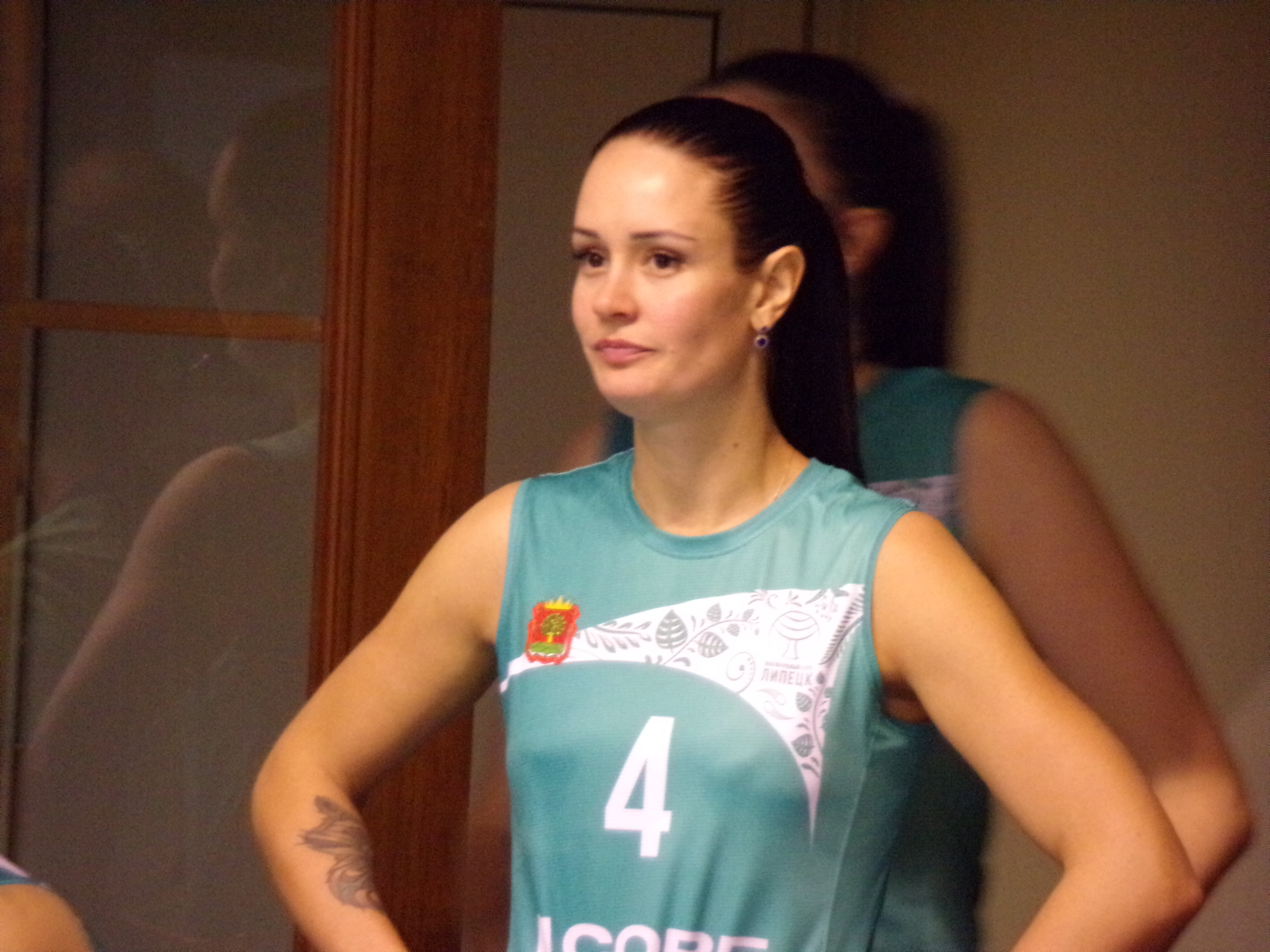
- Enina in 2020

Personal information
- Nationality: Russian
- Born: 10 May 1993 (age 33); Chelyabinsk, Russia
- Height: 192 cm (6 ft 4 in)
- Weight: 72 kg (159 lb)

Volleyball information
- Position: Middle Blocker
- Current club: VC Dynamo Moscow

National team
2021	Russia

Ekaterina Enina (born 10 May 1993 in Chelyabinsk) is a Russian volleyball player. She is part of the Russia women's national volleyball team. She competed at the 2020 Summer Olympics.

== Career ==
She participated in the 2017 European championship, and 2016/17 Superliga.

On club level she has played for VC Uralochka-NTMK, and VC Dynamo Moscow.
