= Volleyball at the 2011 Summer Universiade – Women's tournament =

The women's tournament of volleyball at the 2011 Summer Universiade at Shenzhen, China began on August 14 and ended on August 21.

== Teams ==
Americas	Asia	Europe
Brazil; Canada	China; Chinese Taipei; Japan; Hong Kong; Thailand	Belgium; France; Italy; Norway; Poland; Russia; Sweden; Ukraine

== Preliminary round ==
=== Group A ===
Pos	Team	Pld	W	L	Pts	SW	SL	SR	SPW	SPL	SPR
1	China	3	3	0	6	9	1	9.000	247	184	1.342
2	Japan	3	2	1	5	7	4	1.750	262	199	1.317
3	Belgium	3	1	2	4	4	6	0.667	210	209	1.005
4	Sweden	3	0	3	3	0	9	0.000	98	225	0.436

Date		Score		Set 1	Set 2	Set 3	Set 4	Set 5	Total
14 August	China	3–0	Belgium	25–23	25–19	25–17			75–59
14 August	Sweden	0–3	Japan	6–25	9–25	11–25			26–75
15 August	Japan	3–1	Belgium	25–27	25–17	25–15	25–17		100–76
15 August	Sweden	0–3	China	14–25	13–25	11–25			38–75
16 August	China	3–1	Japan	22–25	25–18	25–21	25–23		97–87
16 August	Belgium	3–0	Sweden	25–9	25–13	25–12			75–34

=== Group B ===
Pos	Team	Pld	W	L	Pts	SW	SL	SR	SPW	SPL	SPR
1	Brazil	2	2	0	4	6	0	MAX	150	88	1.705
2	Italy	2	1	1	3	3	4	0.750	145	165	0.879
3	Ukraine	2	0	2	2	1	6	0.167	136	178	0.764

Date		Score		Set 1	Set 2	Set 3	Set 4	Set 5	Total
14 August	Ukraine	0–3	Brazil	14–25	12–25	16–25			42–75
15 August	Ukraine	1–3	Italy	23–25	20–25	30–28	17–25		90–103
16 August	Brazil	3–0	Italy	25–22	25–9	25–15			75–46

=== Group C ===
Pos	Team	Pld	W	L	Pts	SW	SL	SR	SPW	SPL	SPR
1	Poland	3	3	0	6	9	0	MAX	228	180	1.267
2	Chinese Taipei	3	2	1	5	6	5	1.200	258	250	1.032
3	Canada	3	1	2	4	4	7	0.571	238	265	0.898
4	France	3	0	3	3	2	9	0.222	235	264	0.890

Date		Score		Set 1	Set 2	Set 3	Set 4	Set 5	Total
14 August	Poland	3–0	Canada	25–19	25–17	28–26			78–62
14 August	France	1–3	Chinese Taipei	20–25	26–24	21–25	22–25		89–99
15 August	Canada	1–3	Chinese Taipei	27–25	15–25	22–25	22–25		86–100
15 August	Poland	3–0	France	25–23	25–20	25–16			75–59
16 August	France	1–3	Canada	25–27	25–13	19–25	18–25		87–90
16 August	Chinese Taipei	0–3	Poland	16–25	21–25	22–25			59–75

=== Group D ===
Pos	Team	Pld	W	L	Pts	SW	SL	SR	SPW	SPL	SPR
1	Russia	3	3	0	6	9	0	MAX	225	122	1.844
2	Thailand	3	2	1	5	6	3	2.000	210	158	1.329
3	Hong Kong	3	1	2	4	3	6	0.500	144	194	0.742
4	Norway	3	0	3	3	0	9	0.000	120	225	0.533

Date		Score		Set 1	Set 2	Set 3	Set 4	Set 5	Total
14 August	Thailand	0–3	Russia	14–25	23–25	23–25			60–75
14 August	Norway	0–3	Hong Kong	23–25	15–25	6–25			44–75
15 August	Russia	3–0	Hong Kong	25–9	25–7	25–12			75–28
15 August	Thailand	3–0	Norway	25–14	25–13	25–15			75–42
16 August	Norway	0–3	Russia	8–25	12–25	14–25			34–75
16 August	Hong Kong	0–3	Thailand	11–25	12–25	18–25			41–75

== Quarterfinal Round ==
=== Classification 9-15 places ===
Date		Score		Set 1	Set 2	Set 3	Set 4	Set 5	Total
18 August	Belgium	3–0	France	25–14	25–23	25–22			75–59
18 August	Canada	3–1	Sweden	25–17	21–25	25–22	25–23		96–87
18 August	Italy	3–0	Norway	25–13	25–9	25–13			75–35

=== Quarterfinals ===
Date		Score		Set 1	Set 2	Set 3	Set 4	Set 5	Total
18 August	China	3–1	Chinese Taipei	25–12	18–25	25–23	25–13		93–73
18 August	Brazil	3–1	Thailand	21–25	28–26	25–21	26–24		100–96
18 August	Poland	1–3	Japan	21–25	16–25	26–24	27–29		90–103
18 August	Russia	3–1	Ukraine	25–22	25–27	25–15	25–14		100–78

== Semifinal Round ==
=== Classification 13-15 places ===
Date		Score		Set 1	Set 2	Set 3	Set 4	Set 5	Total
19 August	Sweden	3–0	Norway	25–11	25–15	25–21			75–47

=== Classification 9-12 places ===
Date		Score		Set 1	Set 2	Set 3	Set 4	Set 5	Total
19 August	Canada	1–3	Italy	21–25	25–21	21–25	19–25		86–96
19 August	Belgium	3–0	Hong Kong	25–14	25–12	25–8			75–34

=== Classification 5-8 places ===
Date		Score		Set 1	Set 2	Set 3	Set 4	Set 5	Total
19 August	Thailand	3–1	Poland	21–25	25–22	25–14	25–18		96–79
19 August	Ukraine	0–3	Chinese Taipei	26–28	18–25	24–26			68–79

=== Semifinals ===
Date		Score		Set 1	Set 2	Set 3	Set 4	Set 5	Total
19 August	Japan	1–3	Brazil	25–27	23–25	25–20	17–25		90–97
19 August	China	3–0	Russia	25–21	25–22	25–20			75–63

== Final round ==
=== Final 13-14 places ===
Date		Score		Set 1	Set 2	Set 3	Set 4	Set 5	Total
20 August	France	3–0	Sweden	25–16	25–15	25–23			75–54

=== Final 11-12 places ===
Date		Score		Set 1	Set 2	Set 3	Set 4	Set 5	Total
20 August	Canada	3–0	Hong Kong	25–16	25–15	25–16			75–47

=== Final 9-10 places ===
Date		Score		Set 1	Set 2	Set 3	Set 4	Set 5	Total
20 August	Belgium	3–1	Italy	25–14	25–27	25–20	25–18		100–79

=== Final 7-8 places ===
Date		Score		Set 1	Set 2	Set 3	Set 4	Set 5	Total
20 August	Poland	3–2	Ukraine	25–15	21–25	25–21	20–25	15–13	106–99

=== Final 5-6 places ===
Date		Score		Set 1	Set 2	Set 3	Set 4	Set 5	Total
20 August	Chinese Taipei	2–3	Thailand	28–26	18–25	21–25	25–19	11–15	103–110

=== Bronze medal match ===
Date		Score		Set 1	Set 2	Set 3	Set 4	Set 5	Total
21 August	Russia	3–1	Japan	25–15	25–21	22–25	25–17		97–78

=== Gold Medal match ===
Date		Score		Set 1	Set 2	Set 3	Set 4	Set 5	Total
21 August	Brazil	3–1	China	25–19	25–19	21–25	28–26		99–89

== Final standings ==
Place	Team	Score
1st place, gold medalist(s)	Brazil	6–0
2nd place, silver medalist(s)	China	5–1
3rd place, bronze medalist(s)	Russia	5–1
4	Japan	3–3
5	Thailand	4–2
6	Chinese Taipei	2–3
7	Poland	3–3
8	Ukraine	2–4
9	Belgium	4–2
10	Italy	2–3
11	Canada	3–3
12	Hong Kong	1–4
13	France	1–4
14	Sweden	1–5
15	Norway	0–5
