= Anastasia Markova =

Russian volleyball player (born 1987)

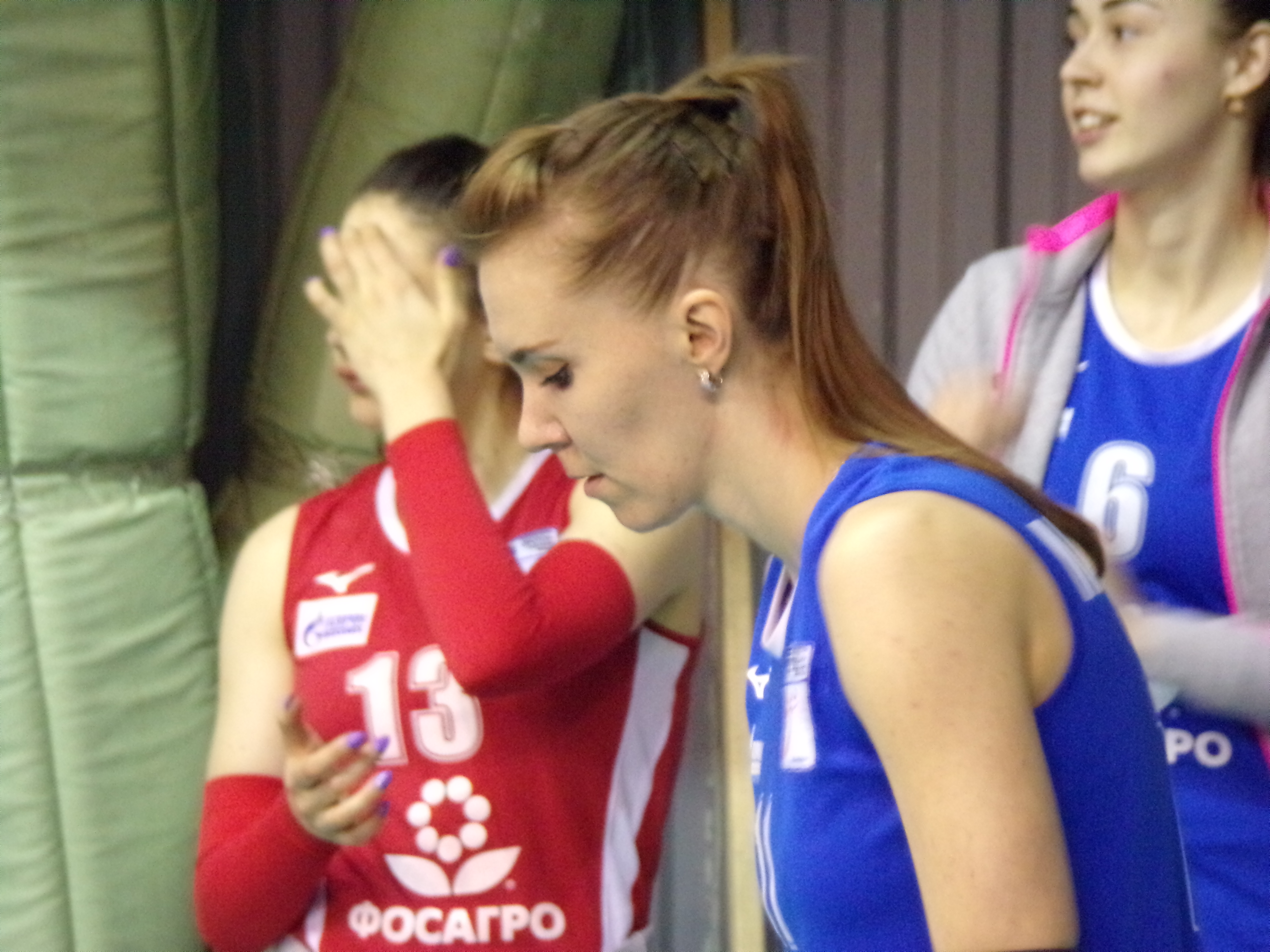

Personal information
- Nationality: Russian
- Born: 16 October 1987 (age 39)
- Height: 189 cm (74 in)
- Weight: 71 kg (157 lb)
- Spike: 305 cm (120 in)
- Block: 300 cm (118 in)

Volleyball information
- Number: 9 (national team)

Career
Years	Teams
2014	Dinamo Moscow

National team
2014	Russia

Anastasia Markova (born 16 October 1987) is a Russian female volleyball player. She is part of the Russia women's national volleyball team.

She participated in the 2014 FIVB Volleyball World Grand Prix. On club level she played for Dinamo Moscow in 2014.
