= Anna Podkopaeva =

Russian volleyball player

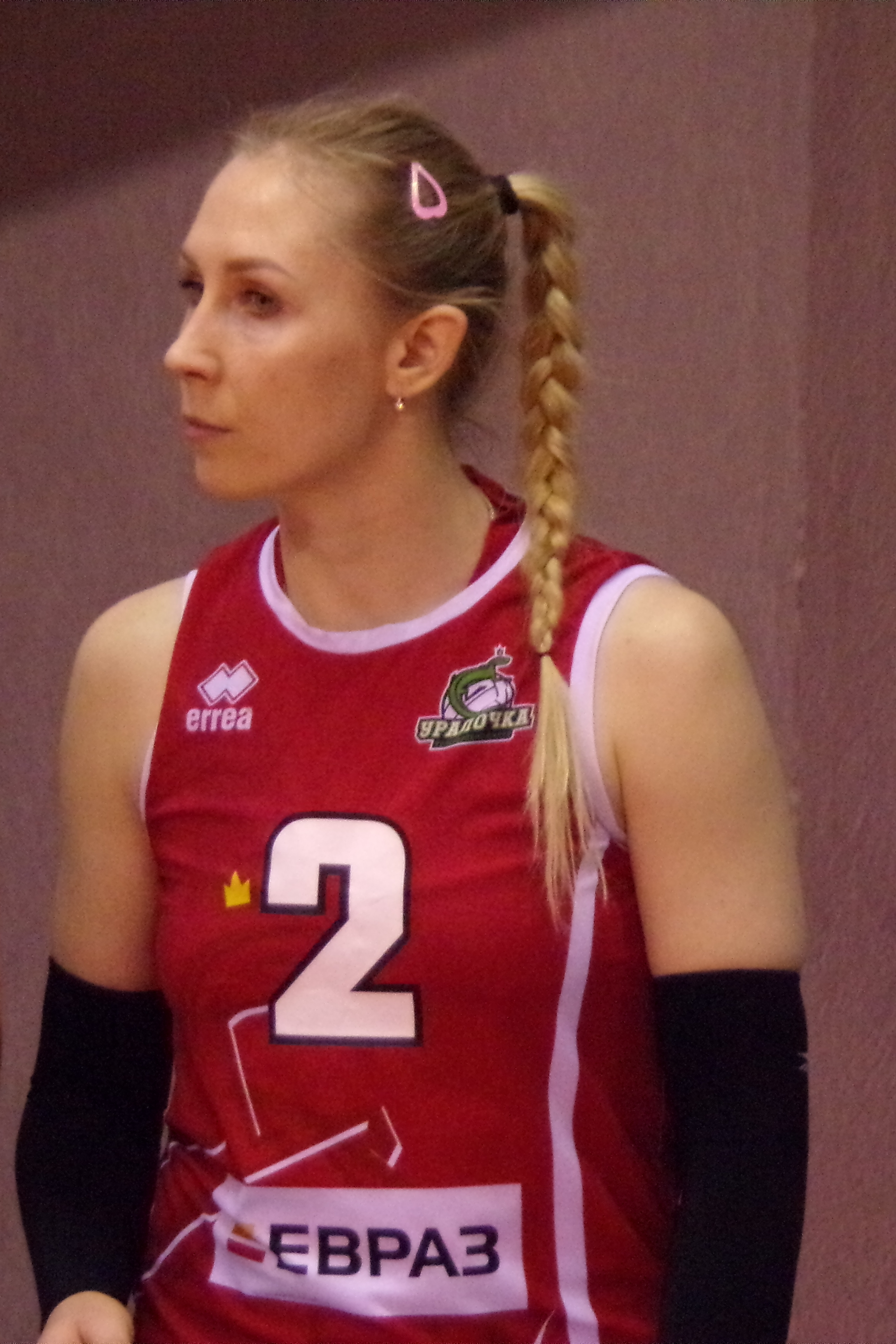

Personal information
- Full name: Anna Nicolaevna Malova
- Nationality: Russia
- Born: 16 April 1990 (age 36); Ulyanovsk, Russian SFSR, Soviet Union
- Height: 1.75 m (5 ft 9 in)
- Weight: 59 kg (130 lb)
- Spike: 287 cm (113 in)
- Block: 280 cm (110 in)

Volleyball information
- Position: Libero
- Current club: WVC Dynamo Kazan
- Number: 19 (club and national team)

National team
2013–2016, 2020–	Russia
Honours
Women's volleyball
Representing Russia
FIVB World Grand Prix
Silver medal – second place	2015 Omaha	Team
Bronze medal – third place	2014 Tokyo	Team
European Championship
Gold medal – first place	2013 Germany/Switzerland	Team
Gold medal – first place	2015 Netherlands/Belgium	Team
- Last updated: 21 January 2017

Anna Nicolaevna Podkopaeva (Russian: А́нна Никола́евна Подкопаева, born 16 April 1990 in Ulyanovsk, née Malova (Russian: Мало́ва)) is a Russian volleyball player. She is a member of the Russia women's national volleyball team and participated in several international competitions including: 2013 Summer Universiade in Kazan, the Montreux Volley Masters (in 2013, 2014), the FIVB Volleyball World Grand Prix (in 2013, 2014, 2015, 2016), the European Championships (in 2013, 2015), the 2014 FIVB Volleyball Women's World Championship in Italy, the 2015 FIVB Volleyball Women's World Cup in Japan, and the 2016 Summer Olympics in Rio de Janeiro.

At club level, she played for Iskra Samara and Ufimochka before joining Dinamo Moscow in January 2014.

== Clubs ==
- (Russia) Iskra Samara (2007–2009)
- (Russia) Ufimochka (2009–2014)
- (Russia) Dinamo Moscow (2014–2018)
- (Russia) WVC Dynamo Kazan (2018–2022)
- (Russia) Dinamo Moscow (2022–2023)

== Awards ==
=== Individuals ===
- 2015 FIVB World Grand Prix "Best Libero"
- 2015 European Championship "Best Libero"

=== National team ===
==== Junior ====
- 2013 Universiade – Gold medal

==== Senior ====
- 2013 Montreux Volley Masters – Silver medal
- 2013 Boris Yeltsin Cup – Gold medal
- 2013 European Championship – Gold medal
- 2014 Montreux Volley Masters – Bronze medal
- 2014 FIVB World Grand Prix – Bronze medal
- 2015 FIVB World Grand Prix – Silver medal
- 2015 European Championship – Gold medal

=== Clubs ===
- 2013 Russian Cup – Gold medal (with Dinamo Moscow)
- 2013–14 Russian Championship – Silver medal (with Dinamo Moscow)
- 2014–15 Russian Championship – Silver medal (with Dinamo Moscow)
- 2015–16 Russian Championship – Gold medal (with Dinamo Moscow)
- 2016 Russian Cup – Silver medal (with Dinamo Moscow)
- 2016–17 Russian Championship – Gold medal (with Dinamo Moscow)

Awards
Preceded by (Japan) Yūko Sano	Best Libero of FIVB World Grand Prix; 2015	Succeeded by (China) Lin Li
