= VC Yenisey Krasnoyarsk =

Russian volleyball club

VC Yenisey
- Full name: Volleyball Club Yenisey Krasnoyarsk
- Founded: 1992
- Ground: Mikhaila Dvorkina, Krasnoyarsk (Capacity: 1,500)
- Chairman: Alexey Maslov
- Manager: Aleksandr Perepelkin
- Captain: Maria Frolova
- League: Women's Super League
- 2021–22: 10th
- Website: Club home page

Yenisey (Russian: Енисей) also spelled Yenisei and Enisey, is a Russian women's volleyball club based in Krasnoyarsk. The club was founded in 1992 and currently plays in the super league, the top Russian league.

== Previous names ==
- Sibiryachka (1992–1995)
- Nika (1995–1997)
- Bogur (1997–2000)
- Yeniseyushka (Eniseyushka) (2000–2003)
- Metrostroy (2003–2004)
- Stroytel (2004–2010)
- Yonost (2010–2012)
- Yenisey (Yenisei / Enisey) (2012–present)

== History ==
The club was established in 1992 as Sibiryachka. It has changed names many times (Nika, Bogur, Yeniseyushka, Metrostroy, Yonost) and has been competing mainly in the lower leagues of the Russian Championship and the Cup of Siberia and Far East. It played at the Super League for the first time in the 2004–05 season and finished last.

In January 2012 the club came under the professional structure of Volleyball Club Yenisey and was renamed Yenisey.

== Team roster ==
Season 2020–2021, as of December 2020.

Number	Player	Position	Height (m)	Weight (kg)	Birth date
1	(Russia) Yana Datsiy	Libero	1.68		15 August 2001 (age 24)
5	(Peru) Ángela Leyva	Outside hitter	1.82	70	22 November 1996 (age 28)
7	(Russia) Irina Klimanova	Middle blocker	1.87	65	17 August 1987 (age 38)
9	(Russia) Maria Frolova	Outside hitter	1.78	62	1 November 1986 (age 39)
10	(Russia) Anastasia Samoilenko	Middle blocker	1.92	69	5 October 1990 (age 35)
11	(Russia) Evgenia Snegireva	Middle blocker	1.84		31 January 1994 (age 31)
12	(Russia) Evgeniya Shcheglova	Outside hitter	1.76	74	5 February 1996 (age 29)
14	(Russia) Irina Filishtinskaia	Setter	1.80	71	14 June 1990 (age 35)
15	(Russia) Svetlana Kozar	Outside hitter	1.84		23 March 2000 (age 25)
16	(Russia) Anastasya Pestova	Libero	1.78		17 December 1999 (age 25)
17	(Ukraine) Oleksandra Peretiatko	Setter	1.84	69	11 April 1984 (age 41)
18	(Russia) Yulia Brovkina	Middle blocker	1.97	70	21 June 1993 (age 32)
19	(Russia) Sofya Pisarevskaya	Opposite	1.84		23 May 2002 (age 23)
20	(Russia) Karina Simonova	Outside hitter	1.82	68	10 August 2001 (age 24)
