= Leningradka Saint Petersburg =

Russian volleyball club

Leningradka
- Full name: Leningradka Saint-Petersburg
- Founded: 1935
- Ground: Platonov Volleyball Academy, Saint Petersburg, Russia (Capacity: 1,500)
- Manager: Alexander Kashin
- League: Women's Super League
- 2021–22: 7th
- Website: Club home page

Uniforms
Home	Away

Leningradka (Russian: Ленингра́дка) is a Russian women's volleyball club based in Saint Petersburg and plays in the Super League, the top Russian league.

== Previous names ==
- Spartak Leningrad (1935–1977)
- TTU Leningrad (1978–1991)
- TTU Saint-Petersburg (1992–2003)
- Leningradka Saint-Petersburg (2003–present)

== History ==
=== Soviet years ===
Founded in 1935 as the women's volleyball department of the DSO Spartak section based in Leningrad, the club made its debut in the USSR Championship in 1939 and played 43 seasons in the USSR Championship until the tournament folded in 1991. The club changed its name in 1978 to Tрамвайно-троллейбусное управление (TTU) Leningrad. During the Soviet period, the club won the USSR Cup twice (1976, 1977) and reached the final of the European Cup Winners Cup in 1980–81.

=== Russian years ===
The Russian Championship (which eventually became the Super League) was established for the 1991–92 season, but the club played in the second division that season. Since then, it has been promoted and relegated many times in the Russian Leagues with very inconsistent results. In 2003, it changed its name to Leningradka and started to focus on the development and preparation of young players by creating a youth team to support their main team. In the CEV Challenge Cup of 2008–09 the club finished third.

== Honours ==
=== National competitions ===
USSR

- USSR Cup: 2

1976, 1977

== Team squad ==
Season 2018–2019, as of January 2019.

Number	Player	Position	Height (m)	Weight (kg)	Birth date
1	(Russia) Sofia Kuznetsova	Outside hitter	1.80		31 October 1999 (age 26)
2	(Russia) Alina Kuznetsova	Libero	1.77		15 September 1990 (age 35)
3	(Azerbaijan) Yelyzaveta Samadova	Outside hitter	1.85	71	3 March 1995 (age 31)
4	(Russia) Anna Shevchenko	Setter	1.80		20 October 1998 (age 27)
5	(Russia) Svetlana Chesnokova	Middle blocker	1.91		3 March 1987 (age 39)
7	(Russia) Ekaterina Petrova	Opposite	1.91	72	27 November 1993 (age 32)
8	(Russia) Anna Luneva	Middle blocker	1.90	78	12 July 1995 (age 30)
13	(Russia) Anna Kurshina	Outside hitter	1.85		19 March 1992 (age 34)
14	(Russia) Ekaterina Polyakova	Middle blocker	1.95	70	6 February 1987 (age 39)
15	(Russia) Mariya Kashina	Libero	1.67		16 January 1994 (age 32)
16	(Russia) Kseniia Bondar	Outside hitter	1.90	73	1 February 1990 (age 36)
17	(Ukraine) Olga Skripak	Setter	1.83		28 December 1996 (age 29)
18	(Russia) Yuliya Bessonnaya	Outside hitter	1.80		30 October 1988 (age 37)

== Notable players ==
- (Soviet Union) Lyudmila Borozna
- (Soviet Union) Galina Leontyeva
- (Russia) Natalia Alimova
- (Russia) Ekaterina Kabeshova
- (Russia) Olga Nikolaeva
