= Anastasia Shlyakhovaya =

Russian volleyball player

Anastasia Samoilenko
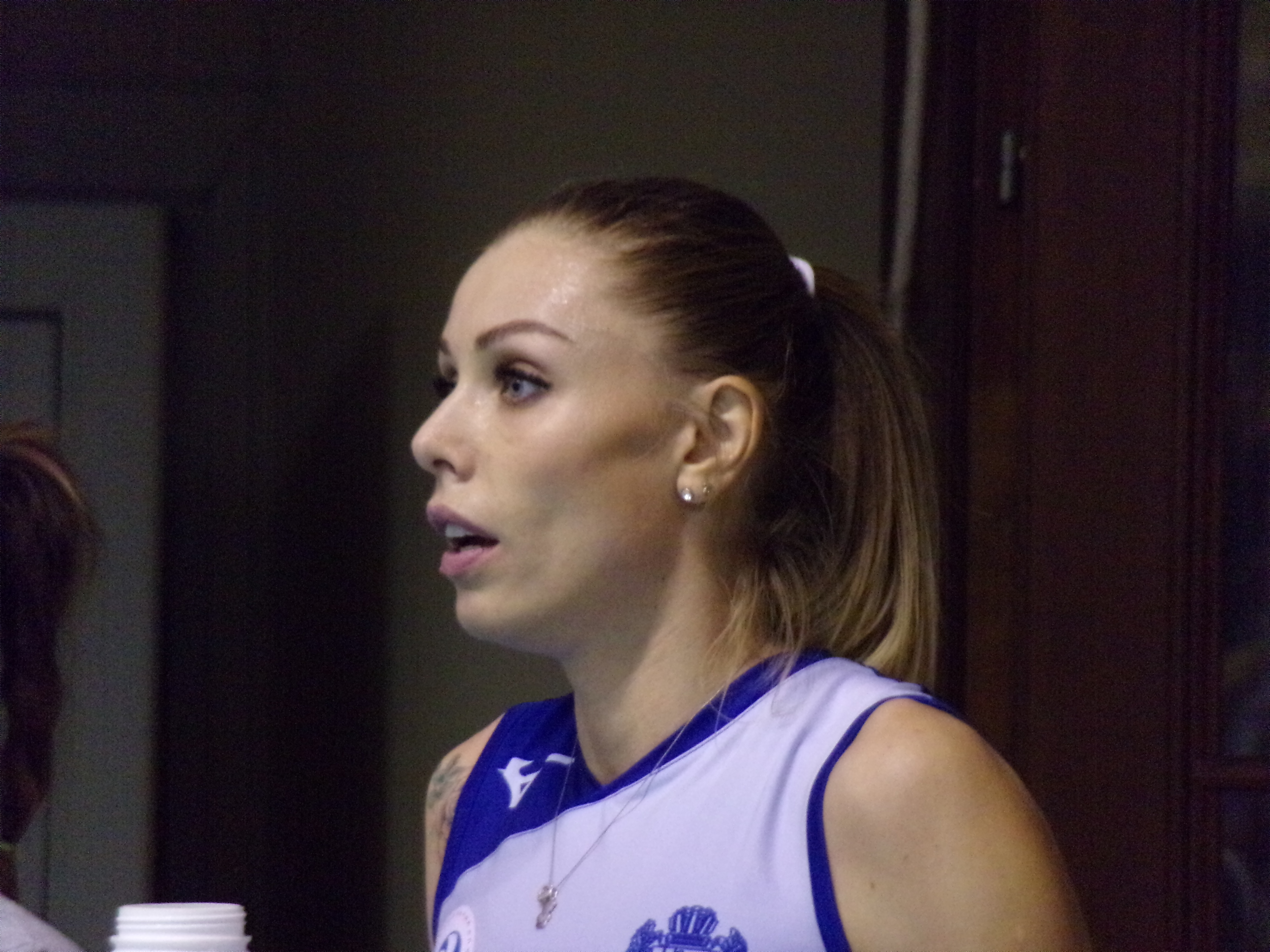

Personal information
- Full name: Anastasia Sergeyevna Samoilenko (Shlyakhovaya)
- Nationality: Russia
- Born: 5 October 1990 (age 36); Zhovtneve (Sofiyivka Raion), Ukrainian SSR, Soviet Union
- Height: 1.92 m (6 ft 4 in)
- Weight: 69 kg (152 lb)
- Spike: 313 cm (123 in)
- Block: 307 cm (121 in)

Volleyball information
- Position: Middle blocker
- Current club: Dinamo Kazan
- Number: 20 (club and national team)

National team
2013–	Russia
Honours
Women's Volleyball
Representing Russia
FIVB World Grand Prix
Silver medal – second place	2015 Omaha	Team
European Championship
Gold medal – first place	2013 Germany/Switzerland	Team
- Last updated: 22 January 2017

Anastasia Sergeyevna Samoilenko, née Shlyakhovaya (Russian: Анастасия Сергеевна Самойленко, born 5 October 1990 in Zhovtneve) is a Russian volleyball player. She was part of the Russia women's national volleyball team at the 2013 Summer Universiade in Kazan, the Montreux Volley Masters (in 2013, 2014), the FIVB Volleyball World Grand Prix (in 2013, 2014, 2015, 2016), the 2013 Women's European Volleyball Championship in Germany and Switzerland, and the 2016 Summer Olympics in Rio de Janeiro.

At club level, she played for Ufimochka and Omichka before joining Dinamo Krasnodar in 2015.

== Personal life ==
She married basketball player Bogdan Samoilenko in December 2014.

== Clubs ==
- (Russia) Ufimochka (2007–2013)
- (Russia) Omichka Omsk (2013–2015)
- (Russia) Dinamo Krasnodar (2015–2017)
- (Russia) Dinamo Kazan (2017–2018)

== Awards ==
=== National team ===
==== Junior ====
- 2013 Universiade – Gold medal

==== Senior ====
- 2013 Montreux Volley Masters – Silver medal
- 2013 Boris Yeltsin Cup – Gold medal
- 2013 European Championship – Gold medal
- 2014 Montreux Volley Masters – Bronze medal
- 2015 FIVB World Grand Prix – Silver medal

=== Clubs ===
- 2014 Russian Cup – Silver medal (with Omichka Omsk)
- 2015 Russian Cup – Gold medal (with Dinamo Krasnodar)
- 2015–16 CEV Cup – Gold medal (with Dinamo Krasnodar)
