= Ekaterina Pankova =

Russian volleyball player

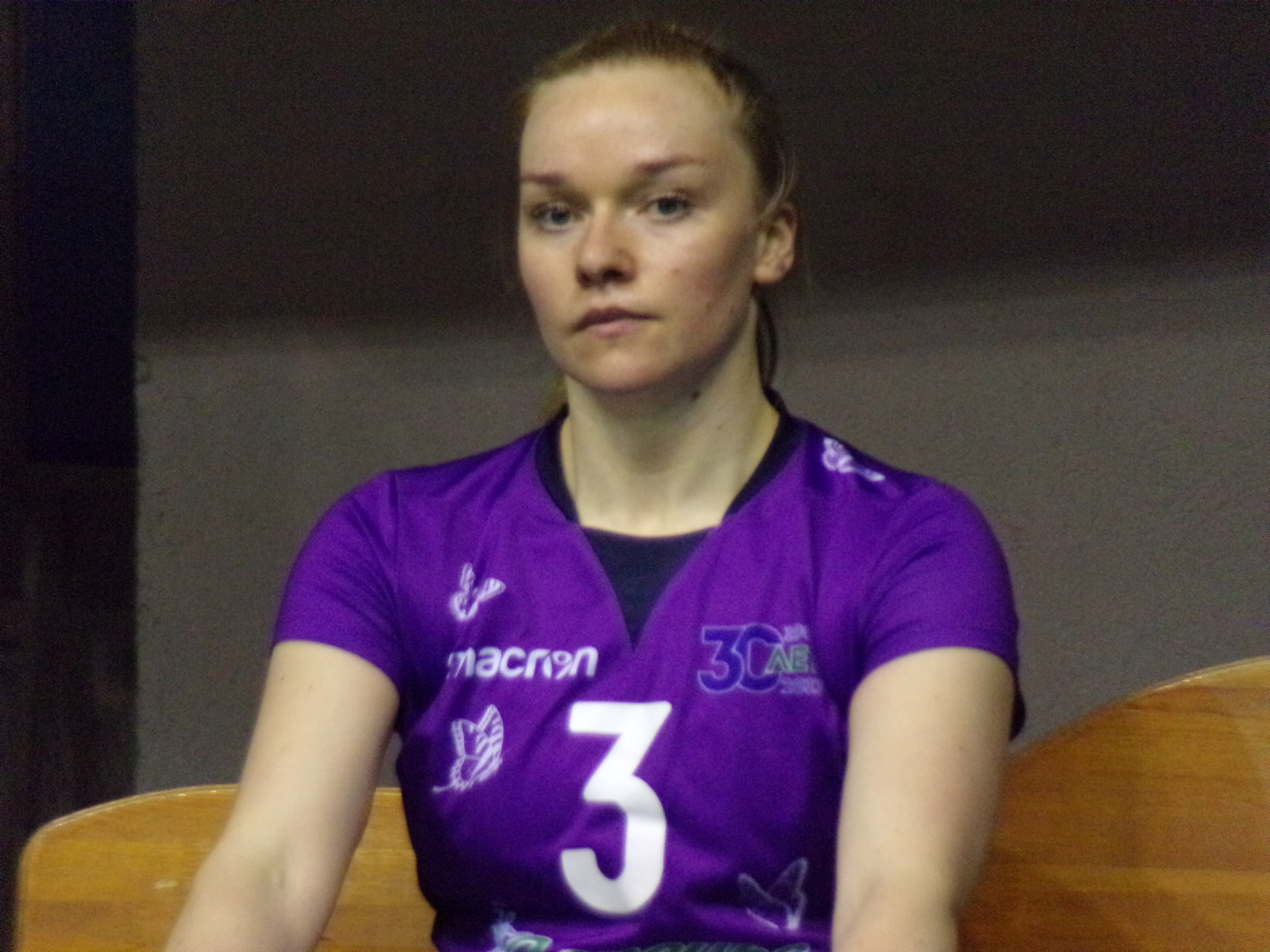
- Ekaterina Pankova in 2018

Personal information
- Full name: Ekaterina Vadimovna Pankova
- Nationality: Russian
- Born: February 2, 1990 (age 36); Sverdlovsk, Russian SFSR, Soviet Union
- Height: 178 cm (5 ft 10 in)
- Weight: 75 kg (165 lb)
- Spike: 290 cm (114 in)
- Block: 285 cm (112 in)

Volleyball information
- Position: Setter
- Current club: Dynamo Moscow
- Number: 10

Career
Years	Teams
2007 - 2014; 2014 -	Zarechie Odintsovo; Dynamo Moscow

National team
2011 - 2017	Russia
Honours
Women's volleyball
Representing Russia
World Grand Prix
Silver medal – second place	2015 Omaha
Bronze medal – third place	2014 Tokyo
European Championship
Gold medal – first place	2013 Germany/Switzerland
Gold medal – first place	2015 Netherlands/Belgium

Ekaterina Vadimovna Pankova (Russian: Екатерина Вадимовна Панкова, born 2 February 1990), from 2013 to 2016 Kosianenko, is a Russian volleyball player, who plays as an setter. She is a member of the Russia women's national volleyball team and plays for Dynamo Moscow at club level.

== Career ==
She started playing volleyball at the youth teams of Uralochka before starting her professional career in 2007 at Zarechie Odintsovo. With them she won the Russian Super League in 2007 - 2008 and 2009 - 2010, the Russian Cup in 2007 and the CEV Women's Challenge Cup in 2013 - 2014. She moved to Dynamo Moscow in 2014 and at the club she won the Russian Super League in 2015 - 2016.

With the Russia women's national volleyball team, she has participated at youth and senior competitions, being part of the teams which played the 2013 Summer Universiade in Kazan, the Montreux Volley Masters (in 2013, 2014), the FIVB Volleyball World Grand Prix (in 2011, 2013, 2014, 2015, 2016), the European Championships (in 2013, 2015), the 2014 FIVB Volleyball Women's World Championship in Italy, the 2015 FIVB Volleyball Women's World Cup in Japan, and the 2016 Summer Olympics in Rio de Janeiro.

== Personal life ==
Pankova was born 2 February 1990 in Sverdlovsk (now Yekaterinburg). She is the daughter of Vadim Pankov and Marina Pankova (née Nikulina). Her family has a tradition in volleyball, her father is the current coach of Zarechie Odintsovo and her mother played in three Olympic Games (gold in Seoul 1988, silver in Barcelona 1992 and fourth in Atlanta 1996), and was world champion at the 1990 FIVB Volleyball Women's World Championship. Her younger brother Pavel Pankov is also a volleyball player.

== Awards ==
=== Individuals ===
- 2013 European Championship "Best Setter"
- 2014 Montreux Volley Masters "Best Setter"

=== National team ===
==== Junior ====
- 2005 Girls' Youth European Volleyball Championship - Silver medal
- 2005 FIVB Volleyball Girls' U18 World Championship - Silver medal
- 2007 FIVB Volleyball Girls' U18 World Championship - Bronze medal
- 2008 Women's Junior European Volleyball Championship - Silver medal
- 2013 Universiade – Gold medal

==== Senior ====
- 2013 Montreux Volley Masters - Silver medal
- 2013 European Championship - Gold medal
- 2014 Montreux Volley Masters - Bronze medal
- 2014 FIVB World Grand Prix - Bronze medal
- 2015 FIVB World Grand Prix - Silver medal
- 2015 European Championship - Gold medal

=== Clubs ===
- 2007 Russian Cup - Champion (with Zarechie Odintsovo)
- 2007–08 CEV Champions League - Runner-Up (with Zarechie Odintsovo)
- 2007 - 2008 Russian Championship - Champion (with Zarechie Odintsovo)
- 2008 - 2009 Russian Championship - Runner-Up (with Zarechie Odintsovo)
- 2009 Russian Cup - Runner-Up (with Zarechie Odintsovo)
- 2009 - 2010 Russian Championship - Champion (with Zarechie Odintsovo)
- 2013 - 2014 CEV Challenge Cup - Champion (with Zarechie Odintsovo)
- 2014 - 2015 Russian Championship - Runner-Up (with Dinamo Moscow)
- 2015 - 2016 Russian Championship - Champion (with Dinamo Moscow)
- 2016 Russian Cup - Runner-Up (with Dinamo Moscow)
- 2016 -2017 Russian Championship - Champion (with Dinamo Moscow)
