= Aleksandra Pasynkova =

Russian volleyball player (born 1987)

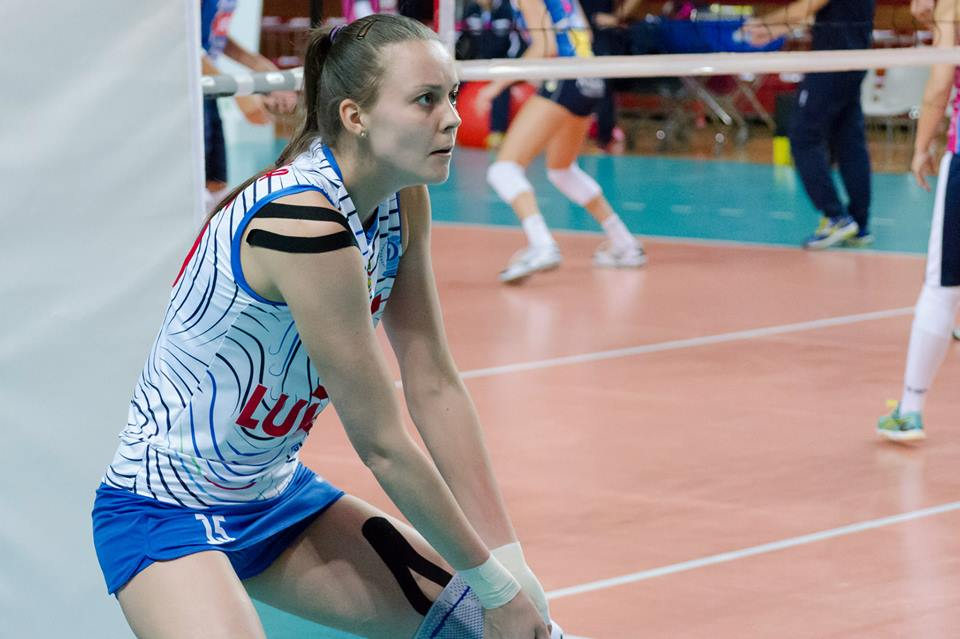

Personal information
- Full name: Aleksandra Arkadyevna Pasynkova
- Nickname: Passynkova
- Nationality: Russian
- Born: 14 April 1987 (age 39); Ekaterinburg, Soviet Union
- Height: 1.90 m (6 ft 3 in)
- Weight: 75 kg (165 lb)
- Spike: 313 cm (123 in)
- Block: 305 cm (120 in)

Volleyball information
- Position: Outside hitter
- Current club: Dynamo Kazan
- Number: 15

Career
Years	Teams
2002–2003; 2003–2014; 2014–2016; 2016–2017; 2017–2018; 2018-	Dinamo-Yantar Kaliningrad; Uralochka-NTMK Ekaterinburg; Dinamo Krasnodar; Sakhalin Yuzhno-Sakhalinsk; Proton Saratov; Dynamo Kazan

National team
2005–2015	Russia
Honours
Women's volleyball
Representing Russia
World Grand Prix
Silver medal – second place	2015 Omaha	Team
Silver medal – second place	2009 Tokyo	Team
Bronze medal – third place	2014 Tokyo	Team
European Championships
Gold medal – first place	2015 Netherlands / Belgium	Team
Gold medal – first place	2013 Germany / Switzerland	Team
Universiade
Gold medal – first place	2013 Kazan	Team

Aleksandra Arkadyevna Pasynkova (Russian: Алекса́ндра Арка́дьевна Па́сынкова; born 14 April 1987) is a volleyball player from Russia. She plays for Uralochka-NTMK (since 2002).

== Clubs ==
- (Russia) Dinamo-Yantar Kaliningrad (2002–2003)
- (Russia) Uralochka-NTMK Ekaterinburg (2003–2014)
- (Russia) Dinamo Krasnodar (2014–2016)
- (Russia) Sakhalin Yuzhno-Sakhalinsk (2016–2017)
- (Russia) Proton Saratov (2017–2018)
- (Russia) Dynamo Kazan (2018–present)

== Awards ==
=== Individuals ===
- 2016 CEV Cup - Best Receiver

=== Clubs ===
==== FIVB Club World Championship ====
- Zurich 2015 - with Dinamo Krasnodar

==== CEV Cup ====
- 2008/2009 - with Uralochka-NTMK Ekaterinburg
- 2013/2014 - with Uralochka-NTMK Ekaterinburg
- 2014/2015 - with Dinamo Krasnodar
- 2015/2016 - with Dinamo Krasnodar

==== National Championships ====
- 2003/2004 Russian Championship, with Uralochka-NTMK Ekaterinburg
- 2004/2005 Russian Championship, with Uralochka-NTMK Ekaterinburg
- 2007/2008 Russian Championship, with Uralochka-NTMK Ekaterinburg
- 2008/2009 Russian Championship, with Uralochka-NTMK Ekaterinburg
- 2011/2012 Russian Championship, with Uralochka-NTMK Ekaterinburg
- 2014/2015 Russian Cup, with Dinamo Krasnodar
- 2015/2016 Russian Cup, with Dinamo Krasnodar
- 2015/2016 Russian Championship, with Dinamo Krasnodar

=== National team ===
==== Senior team ====
- 2005 Boris Yeltsin Cup
- 2008 Boris Yeltsin Cup
- 2009 Boris Yeltsin Cup
- 2009 FIVB World Grand Prix
- 2013 Montreux Volley Masters
- 2013 Boris Yeltsin Cup
- 2013 Universiade
- 2013 CEV European Championship
- 2014 Boris Yeltsin Cup
- 2014 FIVB World Grand Prix
- 2015 Boris Yeltsin Cup
- 2015 FIVB World Grand Prix
- 2015 CEV European Championship
