= Irina Koroleva =

Russian volleyball player (born 1991)

Irina Zaryazhko Koroleva
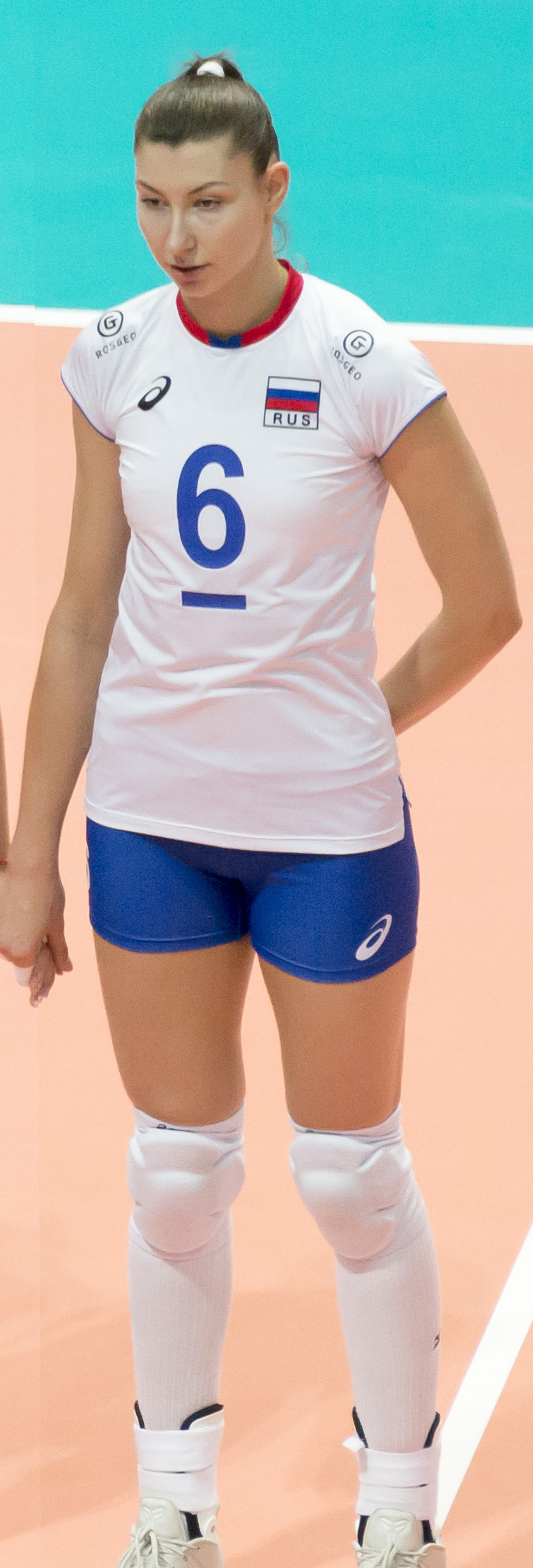

Personal information
- Full name: Irina Vladimirovna Zaryazhko
- Nationality: Russian
- Born: 4 October 1991 (age 35); Novosibirsk, Russian SFSR, Soviet Union
- Height: 1.98 m (6 ft 6 in)
- Weight: 81 kg (179 lb)
- Spike: 305 cm (120 in)
- Block: 290 cm (114 in)

Volleyball information
- Position: Middle blocker
- Current club: Dinamo Kazan
- Number: 6

Career
| Years | Teams |
|---|---|
| 2006–2009; 2009–2011; 2011–2016; 2016–Present | Aouroum Khabarovsk; Samorodok Khabarovsk; Uralochka Yekaterinburg; Dinamo Kazan |

National team
| 2013–Present | Russia |
Honours
Women's volleyball
Representing Russia
World Cup
| Bronze medal – third place | 2019 Japan |
World Grand Prix
| Bronze medal – third place | 2014 Tokyo |
European Championship
| Gold medal – first place | 2013 Germany/Switzerland |
| Gold medal – first place | 2015 Netherlands/Belgium |
Summer Universiade
| Gold medal – first place | 2013 Kazan | Team |
| Gold medal – first place | 2015 Gwangju | Team |

Irina Vladimirovna Koroleva (née Zaryazhko) (Russian: Ирина Владимировна Королева (Заряжко), born 4 October 1991) is a Russian volleyball player, who plays as a middle blocker. She is a member of the Women's National Team and has participated at the Universiade (in Kazan 2013, Gwangju 2015), the Montreux Volley Masters (in 2013, 2014, 2015), the Women's European Volleyball Championship (in 2013, 2015), the FIVB Volleyball World Grand Prix (in 2013, 2014, 2015, 2016), the 2014 FIVB Volleyball Women's World Championship in Italy, the 2015 European Games in Baku, and the 2016 Summer Olympics in Rio de Janeiro.

At club level, she played for Aouroum Khabarovsk, Samorodok Khabarovsk and Uralochka before joining Dinamo Kazan in 2016.

== Awards ==
=== Individuals ===
- 2013 Montreux Volley Masters "Best Blocker"
- 2015 European Championship "Best Middle Blockers"
- 2017 Yeltsin Cup "Best Blocker"
- 2019 World Cup "Best blocker"

=== National team ===
==== Junior ====
- 2013 Universiade – Gold medal
- 2015 Universiade – Gold medal

==== Senior ====
- 2013 Montreux Volley Masters – Silver medal
- 2013 Boris Yeltsin Cup – Gold medal
- 2013 European Championship – Gold medal
- 2014 Montreux Volley Masters – Bronze medal
- 2014 Boris Yeltsin Cup – Silver medal
- 2014 FIVB World Grand Prix – Bronze medal
- 2015 FIVB World Grand Prix – Silver medal
- 2015 European Championship – Gold medal
- 2019 World Cup - Bronze medal (with Russia)

=== Clubs ===
- 2013–14 CEV Cup – Silver medal (with Uralochka)
- 2014–15 CEV Women's Challenge Cup – Silver medal (with Uralochka)
- 2015–16 Russian Championship – Silver medal (with Uralochka)
- 2016 Russian Cup – Gold medal (with Dinamo Kazan)
- 2016–17 CEV Cup – Gold medal (with Dinamo Kazan)
- 2016–17 Russian Championship – Silver medal (with Dinamo Kazan)
- 2019 Russian Super League - Champion, with WVC Dynamo Kazan
- 2019 Russian Cup - Champion, with WVC Dynamo Kazan
- 2020 Russian Cup - Champion, with WVC Dynamo Kazan
