= Natalia Malykh =

Russian volleyball player

Natalia Malykh Bykanova

Personal information
- Full name: Natalia Nicolaevna Malykh Bykanova
- Nationality: Russian
- Born: 8 December 1993 (age 32); Volgograd, Russia
- Hometown: Volgograd
- Height: 1.88 m (6 ft 2 in)
- Weight: 65 kg (143 lb)
- Spike: 308 cm (121 in)
- Block: 297 cm (117 in)

Volleyball information
- Position: Opposite
- Current club: (Russia) Dinamo Krasnodar
- Number: 17

Career
Years	Teams
2009–2012; 2012–2015; 2015–	Volzhanochki Volgograd; VC Zarechie Odintsovo; Dinamo Krasnodar

National team
2013–	Russia
Honours
Women's volleyball
Representing Russia
FIVB World Grand Prix
Silver medal – second place	2015 Omaha	Team
Bronze medal – third place	2014 Tokyo	Team
European Championship
Gold medal – first place	2013 Germany/Switzerland	Team
Gold medal – first place	2015 Netherlands/Belgium	Team
Montreux Volley Masters
Silver medal – second place	2013 Montreux	Team
Bronze medal – third place	2014 Montreux	Team
Summer Universiade
Gold medal – first place	2013 Kazan	Team

Natalia Nicolaevna Malykh (Russian: Ната́лья Никола́евна Малы́х, born 8 December 1993 in Volgograd) is a Russian volleyball player, who plays as an opposite. She is member of the Russia women's national volleyball team and plays for Dinamo Krasnodar. Malykh was part of the Russian team which won the European Championships of 2013 and 2015. In 2017, Malykh married Ruslan Bykanov, a beach volleyball player.

== Career ==
Malykh started playing volleyball at the age of eight, when he joined her hometown youth team Volzhanochki Volgograd. In 2009, she was promoted to the first team, where she played for three seasons, taking part in the Liga B, third level of the Russian championship.

She played for the youth national team of Russia in the 2010 Junior European Championship in Serbia and the 2011 U20 World Championship in Peru.

For the 2012–13 season she is signed with VC Zarechie Odintsovo, debuting at the Russian Superligue and winning the 2013–14 Challenge Cup. In 2013, she made her debut for the senior Russian national team, at the Montreux Volley Masters and finish the tournament in second place. Later that year she took part in the XVII Universiade and at the European Championship, winning both competitions. In 2014, she won the bronze medal at the World Grand Prix and in 2015 she was silver medalist in the World Grand Prix and gold at the European Championship.

Ahead of the 2015–16 season she joined Dinamo Krasnodar, signing a two-year contract with the club. On 3 December 2015 Dinamo Krasnodar won the Women's Volley Russian Cup, beating Dinamo Kazan in the final, her first title with the club. On 2 April 2016 she won her second title with the club by claiming the 2016 CEV Women's Cup, defeating Galatasaray Istanbul in the two legs final.

In 2017, Malykh married Ruslan Bykanov, a beach volleyball player.

== Clubs ==
- (Russia) Voljanotchka Volgograd (2009–2012)
- (Russia) VC Zarechie Odintsovo (2012–2015)
- (Russia) Dinamo Krasnodar (2015–present)

== Awards ==
=== Individuals ===
- 2014 Montreux Volley Masters "Best Scorer"
- 2013–14 CEV Challenge Cup "Most Valuable Player"
- 2015–16 CEV Cup "Most Valuable Player"
- 2015–16 CEV Cup "Best Spiker"

=== National team ===
==== Junior ====
- 2013 Universiade – Gold Medal

==== Senior ====
- 2013 Montreux Volley Masters – Silver Medal
- 2013 Boris Yeltsin Cup – Gold Medal
- 2013 European Championship – Gold Medal
- 2014 Montreux Volley Masters – Bronze Medal
- 2014 Boris Yeltsin Cup – Silver Medal
- 2014 FIVB World Grand Prix – Bronze Medal
- 2015 Boris Yeltsin Cup – Gold Medal
- 2015 FIVB World Grand Prix – Silver Medal
- 2015 European Championship – Gold Medal

=== Clubs ===
- 2013–14 CEV Challenge Cup – Champion, with Zarechie Odintsovo
- 2015 Russian Cup – Champion, with Dinamo Krasnodar
- 2015–16 CEV Cup – Champion, with Dinamo Krasnodar
- 2015–16 Russian League - Bronze Medal, with Dinamo Krasnodar
