= 2013 Women's European Volleyball Championship =

Tournament details
- Host countries: Germany; Switzerland
- Dates: 6 – 14 September
- Teams: 16
- Venue: 5 (in 5 host cities)

Final positions
- Champions: Russia (18th title)

Tournament awards
- MVP: (Russia) Tatiana Kosheleva

The 2013 Women's European Volleyball Championship was the 28th edition of the European Volleyball Championship, organised by Europe's governing volleyball body, the Confédération Européenne de Volleyball. It was hosted by Germany and Switzerland from 6 to 14 September 2013. The matches took place in 5 different cities (4 in Germany and one in Switzerland) with the final being played in Berlin.

Russia defeated Germany 3–1 in the final to capture their 18th title and the qualification for the 2013 FIVB Women's World Grand Champions Cup.

== Qualification ==
Team	Method of qualification
Azerbaijan	Qualification Second round group C winners
Belarus	Qualification Third round play-off winners
Belgium	Qualification Second round group E winners
Bulgaria	Qualification Second round group F winners
Croatia	Qualification Second round group D winners
Czech Republic	Qualification Third round play-off winners
France	Qualification Third round play-off winners
Germany	Hosts
Italy	2011 edition fourth place
Netherlands	Qualification Second round group B winners
Poland	2011 edition fifth place
Russia	2011 edition sixth place
Serbia	2011 edition first place
Spain	Qualification Second round group A winners
Switzerland	Hosts
Turkey	2011 edition third place

== Format ==
The tournament was played in two different stages. In the first stage, the sixteen participants were divided in four groups of four teams each. A single round-robin format was played within each group to determine the teams group position, the three best teams of each group (total of 12 teams) progressed to the second stage, with group winners advancing to the quarterfinals while second and third placed advancing to the playoffs.

The second stage of the tournament consisted of a single-elimination, with winners advancing to the next round. A playoff was played (involving group second and third places) to determine which teams joined the group winners in the quarterfinals, followed by semifinals, 3rd place match and final.

== Pools composition ==
Pool A	Pool B	Pool C	Pool D
Germany	Belgium	Azerbaijan	Bulgaria
Netherlands	France	Belarus	Czech Republic
Spain	Italy	Croatia	Poland
Turkey	Switzerland	Russia	Serbia

== Venues ==
The tournament took place in Germany in 4 different venues (Halle, Dresden, Schwerin, Berlin) and one in Switzerland – (Zürich). The semifinals and the finals were played in Berlin, Germany.

Pool A, Championship round	Pool C	Host cities in Germany
Halle, Germany	Dresden, Germany	Host cities in Germany
Gerry Weber Stadion	EnergieVerbund Arena	Host cities in Germany
Capacity: 11,000	Capacity: 4,000	Host cities in Germany
Pool D	Semifinal and Final	Host cities in Germany
Schwerin, Germany	Berlin, Germany	Host cities in Germany
Sport- und Kongresshalle	Max-Schmeling-Halle	Host cities in Germany
Capacity: 5,200	Capacity: 11,000	Host cities in Germany
Pool B, Championship round		Host cities in Switzerland
Zürich, Switzerland		Host cities in Switzerland
Hallenstadion		Host cities in Switzerland
Capacity: 11,500		Host cities in Switzerland

== Preliminary round ==
The draw was held on 6 October 2012 at Zürich, Switzerland.

- All times are Central European Summer Time (UTC+02:00).

=== Pool A ===
- venue: Gerry Weber Stadion, Halle, Germany

Pos	Team	Pld	W	L	Pts	SW	SL	SR	SPW	SPL	SPR	Qualification
1	Germany	3	3	0	8	9	2	4.500	261	221	1.181	Quarterfinals
2	Turkey	3	2	1	5	6	5	1.200	258	222	1.162	Playoffs
3	Netherlands	3	1	2	5	7	6	1.167	280	273	1.026	Playoffs
4	Spain	3	0	3	0	0	9	0.000	142	225	0.631	

Date	Time		Score		Set 1	Set 2	Set 3	Set 4	Set 5	Total	Report
6 Sep	17:00	Germany	3–0	Spain	25–15	25–15	25–17			75–47	Report
6 Sep	20:00	Netherlands	2–3	Turkey	15–25	16–25	29–27	26–24	12–15	98–116	Report
7 Sep	17:00	Germany	3–2	Netherlands	27–25	20–25	22–25	25–23	15–9	109–107	Report
7 Sep	20:00	Spain	0–3	Turkey	13–25	19–25	15–25			47–75	Report
8 Sep	15:00	Spain	0–3	Netherlands	16–25	14–25	18–25			48–75	Report
8 Sep	18:00	Turkey	0–3	Germany	19–25	23–25	25–27			67–77	Report

=== Pool B ===
- venue: Hallenstadion, Zürich, Switzerland

Pos	Team	Pld	W	L	Pts	SW	SL	SR	SPW	SPL	SPR	Qualification
1	Belgium	3	3	0	9	9	2	4.500	270	221	1.222	Quarterfinals
2	Italy	3	2	1	6	7	4	1.750	253	207	1.222	Playoffs
3	France	3	1	2	2	5	8	0.625	256	286	0.895	Playoffs
4	Switzerland	3	0	3	1	2	9	0.222	191	256	0.746	

Date	Time		Score		Set 1	Set 2	Set 3	Set 4	Set 5	Total	Report
6 Sep	18:00	Italy	3–0	Switzerland	25–13	25–11	25–13			75–37	Report
6 Sep	20:30	France	1–3	Belgium	25–22	19–25	17–25	17–25		78–97	Report
7 Sep	15:00	Italy	3–1	France	25–16	25–15	20–25	25–16		95–72	Report
7 Sep	18:00	Switzerland	0–3	Belgium	21–25	16–25	23–25			60–75	Report
8 Sep	15:30	France	3–2	Switzerland	17–25	25–17	24–26	25–17	15–9	106–94	Report
8 Sep	18:30	Belgium	3–1	Italy	22–25	25–16	26–24	25–18		98–83	Report

=== Pool C ===
- venue: EnergieVerbund Arena, Dresden, Germany

Pos	Team	Pld	W	L	Pts	SW	SL	SR	SPW	SPL	SPR	Qualification
1	Russia	3	3	0	9	9	2	4.500	274	228	1.202	Quarterfinals
2	Croatia	3	2	1	6	7	3	2.333	242	205	1.180	Playoffs
3	Belarus	3	1	2	3	4	7	0.571	214	262	0.817	Playoffs
4	Azerbaijan	3	0	3	0	1	9	0.111	210	245	0.857	

Date	Time		Score		Set 1	Set 2	Set 3	Set 4	Set 5	Total	Report
6 Sep	17:30	Azerbaijan	0–3	Croatia	15–25	22–25	21–25			58–75	Report
6 Sep	20:30	Belarus	1–3	Russia	21–25	25–22	14–25	14–25		74–97	Report
7 Sep	17:30	Azerbaijan	1–3	Belarus	23–25	20–25	25–17	22–25		90–92	Report
7 Sep	20:30	Croatia	1–3	Russia	21–25	24–26	25–23	22–25		92–99	Report
8 Sep	15:00	Belarus	0–3	Croatia	19–25	10–25	19–25			48–75	Report
8 Sep	18:00	Russia	3–0	Azerbaijan	25–16	25–20	28–26			78–62	Report

=== Pool D ===
- venue: Sport- und Kongresshalle, Schwerin, Germany

Pos	Team	Pld	W	L	Pts	SW	SL	SR	SPW	SPL	SPR	Qualification
1	Serbia	3	2	1	7	8	4	2.000	286	256	1.117	Quarterfinals
2	Czech Republic	3	2	1	4	6	7	0.857	289	288	1.003	Playoffs
3	Poland	3	1	2	4	6	7	0.857	281	288	0.976	Playoffs
4	Bulgaria	3	1	2	3	6	8	0.750	290	314	0.924	

Date	Time		Score		Set 1	Set 2	Set 3	Set 4	Set 5	Total	Report
6 Sep	17:00	Serbia	2–3	Bulgaria	25–23	25–13	22–25	28–30	13–15	113–106	Report
6 Sep	20:00	Czech Republic	3–2	Poland	24–26	25–21	25–21	24–26	15–12	113–106	Report
7 Sep	17:00	Serbia	3–0	Czech Republic	25–21	26–24	25–23			76–68	Report
7 Sep	20:00	Bulgaria	1–3	Poland	22–25	25–18	13–25	18–25		78–93	Report
8 Sep	15:00	Czech Republic	3–2	Bulgaria	14–25	25–20	29–31	25–19	15–11	108–106	Report
8 Sep	18:00	Poland	1–3	Serbia	18–25	18–25	25–22	21–25		82–97	Report

== Championship round ==
- venues:

Gerry Weber Stadion, Halle, Germany
Hallenstadion, Zürich, Switzerland
Max-Schmeling-Halle, Berlin, Germany

- All times are Central European Summer Time (UTC+02:00).

Playoffs; 10 September
Croatia	3
Netherlands	2
Czech Republic	2
France	3
Turkey	3
Belarus	0
Italy	3
Poland	0

Quarterfinals; 11 September
Germany	3
Croatia	0
Belgium	3
France	2
Russia	3
Turkey	0
Serbia	3
Italy	0

Semifinals; 13 September
Germany	3
Belgium	2
Russia	3
Serbia	0

Final; 14 September
Germany	1
Russia	3
Third place
Belgium	3
Serbia	2

=== Playoffs ===
Date	Time		Score		Set 1	Set 2	Set 3	Set 4	Set 5	Total	Report
10 Sep	17:00	Turkey	3–0	Belarus	25–16	25–13	25–17			75–46	Report
10 Sep	17:30	Italy	3–0	Poland	25–22	25–22	25–13			75–57	Report
10 Sep	20:00	Croatia	3–2	Netherlands	23–25	25–11	22–25	25–23	15–11	110–95	Report
10 Sep	20:30	Czech Republic	2–3	France	25–20	25–9	23–25	23–25	18–20	114–99	Report

=== Quarterfinals ===
Date	Time		Score		Set 1	Set 2	Set 3	Set 4	Set 5	Total	Report
11 Sep	17:00	Russia	3–0	Turkey	25–20	25–23	25–19			75–62	Report
11 Sep	17:30	Belgium	3–2	France	22–25	25–23	21–25	25–20	15–9	108–102	Report
11 Sep	20:00	Germany	3–0	Croatia	25–23	25–23	25–18			75–64	Report
11 Sep	20:30	Serbia	3–0	Italy	25–14	28–26	25–18			78–58	Report

=== Semifinals ===
Date	Time		Score		Set 1	Set 2	Set 3	Set 4	Set 5	Total	Report
13 Sep	17:00	Russia	3–0	Serbia	25–23	25–19	25–12			75–54	Report
13 Sep	20:00	Germany	3–2	Belgium	18–25	20–25	25–21	25–21	15–11	103–103	Report

=== Bronze medal match ===
Date	Time		Score		Set 1	Set 2	Set 3	Set 4	Set 5	Total	Report
14 Sep	17:00	Belgium	3–2	Serbia	23–25	25–21	28–26	21–25	15–11	112–108	Report

=== Final ===
Date	Time		Score		Set 1	Set 2	Set 3	Set 4	Set 5	Total	Report
14 Sep	20:00	Germany	1–3	Russia	23–25	25–23	23–25	14–25		85–98	Report

== Final standing ==
Rank	Team
1st place, gold medalist(s)	Russia
2nd place, silver medalist(s)	Germany
3rd place, bronze medalist(s)	Belgium
4	Serbia
5	Croatia
6	Italy
7	Turkey
8	France
9	Netherlands
10	Czech Republic
11	Poland
12	Belarus
13	Bulgaria
14	Switzerland
15	Azerbaijan
16	Spain

2013 Women's European Volleyball Championship

Russia
18th title

Team Roster:

3 Daria Isaeva 4 Irina Zaryazhko 5 Aleksandra Pasynkova 6 Anna Matienko 7 Svetlana Kryuchkova (L) 8 Nataliya Obmochaeva 10 Ekaterina Kosianenko 11 Victoria Chaplina 14 Natalia Dianskaya 15 Tatiana Kosheleva 16 Iuliia Morozova 17 Natalia Malykh 19 Anna Malova (L)

20 Anastasia Shlyakhovaya
Head Coach: Yuri Marichev

== Individual awards ==
- Most Valuable Player: Tatiana Kosheleva (RUS)
- Best scorer: Lise Van Hecke (BEL)
- Best spiker: Jovana Brakočević (SRB)
- Best blocker: Christiane Fürst (GER)
- Best server: Margareta Kozuch (GER)
- Best setter: Ekaterina Kosianenko (RUS)
- Best receiver: Suzana Ćebić (SRB)
- Best libero: Valerie Courtois (BEL)
- Fair Play Award: Gert Vande Broek (BEL)
