= 2015–16 CEV Women's Champions League =

- League: CEV Women's Champions League
- Sport: Volleyball
- Duration: October 27, 2015 – April 10, 2016

Finals
- Champions: (Italy) Pomì Casalmaggiore
- Runners-up: (Turkey) Vakıfbank Istanbul
- Finals MVP: (Italy) Francesca Piccinini

CEV Women's Champions League seasons
- ← 2014–15 2016–17 →

The 2015–16 CEV Women's Champions League was the 57th edition of the CEV Women's Champions League, the highest level of European club volleyball.

== Teams ==
The number of participants on the basis of ranking list for European Cup Competitions:

Rank	Country	Number of teams	Teams (rankings in 2014–15 national championships)
1	Turkey	3	Fenerbahçe Grundig Istanbul (1); VakıfBank Istanbul (2); Eczacıbaşı VitrA Istanbul (3)
2	Russia	3	Dinamo Kazan (1); Dinamo Moscow (2); Uralochka-NTMK Ekaterinburg (3)
3	France	2	RC Cannes (1); Rocheville Le Cannet (2)
4	Azerbaijan	2+1	Telekom Baku (1); Lokomotiv Baku (2); Azerrail Baku (3) ^{W/C}
5	Poland	2+1	Chemik Police (1); PGE Atom Trefl Sopot (2); Impel Wrocław (3) ^{W/C}
6	Germany	2	Dresdner SC (1); Allianz MTV Stuttgart (2)
7	Italy	2+1	Pomì Casalmaggiore (1); Igor Gorgonzola Novara (2); Nordmeccanica Piacenza (3) ^{W/C}
8	Romania	1	CS Volei Alba Blaj (1)
9	Switzerland	1	Voléro Zürich (1)
10	Czech Republic	1	Agel Prostějov (1)
11	Serbia	1	Vizura Beograd (1)
12	Slovenia	1	Calcit Ljubljana (1)

== Format ==
=== League round ===
24 teams were drawn to 6 pools of 4 teams each.
The 1st and 2nd qualified for the Playoff 12
The organizer of the Final Four were determined after the end of the League Round and qualified directly for the Final Four.
The team of the organizer of the Final Four was replaced by the best 3rd ranked team with the best score.

The next 4 third-placed teams will move to the Challenge Round of the CEV Cup.

The remaining teams will be eliminated.

In the League Round, the placing of the teams is determined by the number of matches won. In case of a tie in the number of matches won by two or more teams, they will be ranked on the basis of the following criteria:

- match points;
- set quotient (the number of total sets won divided by the number of total sets lost);
- points quotient (the number of total points scored divided by the number of total points lost);
- results of head-to-head matches between the teams in question.

=== Playoff round ===
The playoffs will consist of two rounds: Playoff 12 and Playoff 6. Each round is played in two legs.

If the teams are tied after two legs, a "Golden Set" is played. The winner is the team that first obtains 15 points, provided that the points difference between the two teams is at least 2 points (thus, the Golden Set is similar to a tiebreak set in a normal match).

At each leg, points are awarded to the teams in the same manner as in the Group Round (3 for 3:0 or 3:1, 2 for 3:2 etc.). So, if team A defeat team B in the first leg 3:0 and lose in the second leg 1:3, team A does not advance to the next round (as it would have been expected on the basis of analogy with football competitions), but the two teams are tied with 3 points each, and a Golden Set is played.

The three teams that win in Playoff 6 round advance to the Final Four along with the organizer of the Final Four.

== Pools composition ==
The drawing of lots was held in Vienna, Austria on 2 July 2015. The 24 participated teams of the competition were divided by 4 pots based on the latest European Cups Ranking List and their National Rankings. Exception, the teams which received wild cards had to be in the 4th pot.

Pool A	Pool B	Pool C
(Russia) Dinamo Kazan	(Turkey) Vakıfbank Istanbul	(Turkey) Eczacıbaşı VitrA Istanbul
(Azerbaijan) Lokomotiv Baku	(Poland) PGE Atom Trefl Sopot	(Poland) Chemik Police
(Germany) Allianz MTV Stuttgart	(Italy) Igor Gorgonzola Novara	(Italy) Pomì Casalmaggiore
(Azerbaijan) Azerrail Baku	(Slovenia) Calcit Ljubljana	(Czech Republic) Agel Prostějov

Pool D	Pool E	Pool F
(Russia) Uralochka-NTMK Ekaterinburg	(Turkey) Fenerbahçe Grundig Istanbul	(Russia) Dinamo Moscow
(France) RC Cannes	(Azerbaijan) Telekom Baku	(France) Rocheville Le Cannet
(Switzerland) Voléro Zürich	(Germany) Dresdner SC	(Romania) CS Volei Alba Blaj
(Serbia) Vizura Beograd	(Poland) Impel Wrocław	(Italy) Nordmeccanica Piacenza

== League round ==
- All times are local.

=== Pool A ===
Pos	Team	Pld	W	L	Pts	SW	SL	SR	SPW	SPL	SPR	Qualification
1	(Russia) Dinamo Kazan	6	5	1	15	15	5	3.000	481	410	1.173	Playoff round
2	(Azerbaijan) Lokomotiv Baku	6	4	2	12	14	8	1.750	521	460	1.133	Playoff round
3	(Germany) Allianz MTV Stuttgart	6	2	4	6	6	13	0.462	391	456	0.857	2015–16 Women's CEV Cup
4	(Azerbaijan) Azerrail Baku	6	1	5	3	6	15	0.400	431	498	0.865	

Date	Time		Score		Set 1	Set 2	Set 3	Set 4	Set 5	Total	Report
28 Oct	18:00	Azerrail Baku (Azerbaijan)	3–0	(Germany) Allianz MTV Stuttgart	25–18	25–23	25–18			75–59	Report
28 Oct	19:00	Dinamo Kazan (Russia)	3–1	(Azerbaijan) Lokomotiv Baku	25–21	23–25	25–22	25–22		98–90	Report
11 Nov	18:00	Lokomotiv Baku (Azerbaijan)	3–1	(Azerbaijan) Azerrail Baku	25–14	22–25	25–21	25–21		97–81	Report
11 Nov	19:00	Allianz MTV Stuttgart (Germany)	0–3	(Russia) Dinamo Kazan	17–25	20–25	22–25			59–75	Report
25 Nov	18:00	Lokomotiv Baku (Azerbaijan)	3–0	(Germany) Allianz MTV Stuttgart	25–18	25–17	25–18			75–53	Report
26 Nov	19:00	Dinamo Kazan (Russia)	3–0	(Azerbaijan) Azerrail Baku	25–9	25–21	25–20			75–50	Report
9 Dec	18:00	Azerrail Baku (Azerbaijan)	1–3	(Russia) Dinamo Kazan	20–25	25–21	21–25	17–25		83–96	Report
9 Dec	19:00	Allianz MTV Stuttgart (Germany)	3–1	(Azerbaijan) Lokomotiv Baku	25–23	26–24	16–25	25–16		92–88	Report
19 Jan	18:00	Azerrail Baku (Azerbaijan)	1–3	(Azerbaijan) Lokomotiv Baku	25–21	22–25	15–25	14–25		76–96	Report
20 Jan	19:00	Dinamo Kazan (Russia)	3–0	(Germany) Allianz MTV Stuttgart	25–17	25–11	27–25			77–53	Report
27 Jan	18:00	Lokomotiv Baku (Azerbaijan)	3–0	(Russia) Dinamo Kazan	25–16	25–21	25–23			75–60	Report
27 Jan	19:00	Allianz MTV Stuttgart (Germany)	3–0	(Azerbaijan) Azerrail Baku	25–21	25–23	25–22			75–66	Report

=== Pool B ===
Pos	Team	Pld	W	L	Pts	SW	SL	SR	SPW	SPL	SPR	Qualification
1	(Turkey) Vakıfbank Istanbul	6	6	0	17	18	3	6.000	503	385	1.306	Playoff round
2	(Poland) PGE Atom Trefl Sopot	6	4	2	12	12	7	1.714	436	406	1.074	Playoff round
3	(Italy) Igor Gorgonzola Novara	6	2	4	7	10	12	0.833	488	480	1.017	2015–16 Women's CEV Cup
4	(Slovenia) Calcit Ljubljana	6	0	6	0	0	18	0.000	294	450	0.653	

Date	Time		Score		Set 1	Set 2	Set 3	Set 4	Set 5	Total	Report
28 Oct	19:00	Vakıfbank Istanbul (Turkey)	3–1	(Italy) Igor Gorgonzola Novara	25–20	21–25	25–20	25–18		96–83	Report
29 Oct	20:00	Calcit Ljubljana (Slovenia)	0–3	(Poland) PGE Atom Trefl Sopot	14–25	19–25	17–25			50–75	Report
10 Nov	18:00	PGE Atom Trefl Sopot (Poland)	0–3	(Turkey) Vakıfbank Istanbul	17–25	20–25	18–25			55–75	Report
11 Nov	20:30	Igor Gorgonzola Novara (Italy)	3–0	(Slovenia) Calcit Ljubljana	25–21	25–12	25–19			75–52	Report
24 Nov	18:00	PGE Atom Trefl Sopot (Poland)	3–0	(Italy) Igor Gorgonzola Novara	25–21	25–21	25–21			75–63	Report
26 Nov	20:00	Calcit Ljubljana (Slovenia)	0–3	(Turkey) Vakıfbank Istanbul	12–25	14–25	15–25			41–75	Report
9 Dec	19:00	Vakıfbank Istanbul (Turkey)	3–0	(Slovenia) Calcit Ljubljana	25–19	25–8	25–17			75–44	Report
9 Dec	20:30	Igor Gorgonzola Novara (Italy)	1–3	(Poland) PGE Atom Trefl Sopot	25–22	21–25	22–25	21–25		89–97	Report
19 Jan	20:00	Calcit Ljubljana (Slovenia)	0–3	(Italy) Igor Gorgonzola Novara	22–25	14–25	17–25			53–75	Report
20 Jan	19:00	Vakıfbank Istanbul (Turkey)	3–0	(Poland) PGE Atom Trefl Sopot	25–20	25–21	25–18			75–59	Report
27 Jan	18:00	PGE Atom Trefl Sopot (Poland)	3–0	(Slovenia) Calcit Ljubljana	25–21	25–22	25–11			75–54	Report
27 Jan	20:30	Igor Gorgonzola Novara (Italy)	2–3	(Turkey) Vakıfbank Istanbul	20–25	25–21	21–25	25–21	12–15	103–107	Report

=== Pool C ===
Pos	Team	Pld	W	L	Pts	SW	SL	SR	SPW	SPL	SPR	Qualification
1	(Italy) Pomì Casalmaggiore	6	4	2	13	16	10	1.600	562	541	1.039	Playoff round
2	(Turkey) Eczacıbaşı VitrA Istanbul	6	4	2	11	15	10	1.500	559	540	1.035	Playoff round
3	(Poland) Chemik Police	6	4	2	11	13	9	1.444	509	459	1.109	Playoff round
4	(Czech Republic) Agel Prostějov	6	0	6	1	3	18	0.167	416	506	0.822	

Date	Time		Score		Set 1	Set 2	Set 3	Set 4	Set 5	Total	Report
27 Oct	17:00	Eczacıbaşı VitrA Istanbul (Turkey)	2–3	(Italy) Pomì Casalmaggiore	22–25	18–25	25–13	27–25	11–15	103–103	Report
28 Oct	18:00	Chemik Police (Poland)	3–0	(Czech Republic) Agel Prostějov	25–18	25–16	25–21			75–55	Report
10 Nov	17:00	Agel Prostějov (Czech Republic)	0–3	(Turkey) Eczacıbaşı VitrA Istanbul	21–25	23–25	22–25			66–75	Report
11 Nov	20:30	Pomì Casalmaggiore (Italy)	2–3	(Poland) Chemik Police	16–25	23–25	25–23	25–19	12–15	101–107	Report
25 Nov	20:30	Pomì Casalmaggiore (Italy)	3–0	(Czech Republic) Agel Prostějov	25–20	25–16	25–21			75–57	Report
26 Nov	17:00	Eczacıbaşı VitrA Istanbul (Turkey)	3–0	(Poland) Chemik Police	25–22	25–18	26–24			76–64	Report
9 Dec	17:00	Agel Prostějov (Czech Republic)	1–3	(Italy) Pomì Casalmaggiore	15–25	23–25	25–23	15–25		78–98	Report
10 Dec	18:00	Chemik Police (Poland)	3–1	(Turkey) Eczacıbaşı VitrA Istanbul	25–22	25–19	25–27	25–21		100–89	Report
19 Jan	17:00	Eczacıbaşı VitrA Istanbul (Turkey)	3–2	(Czech Republic) Agel Prostějov	25–21	18–25	22–25	28–26	15–12	108–109	Report
20 Jan	18:00	Chemik Police (Poland)	1–3	(Italy) Pomì Casalmaggiore	23–25	25–12	23–25	17–25		88–87	Report
27 Jan	16:30	Agel Prostějov (Czech Republic)	0–3	(Poland) Chemik Police	19–25	14–25	18–25			51–75	Report
27 Jan	20:30	Pomì Casalmaggiore (Italy)	2–3	(Turkey) Eczacıbaşı VitrA Istanbul	25–23	25–20	18–25	22–25	8–15	98–108	Report

=== Pool D ===
Pos	Team	Pld	W	L	Pts	SW	SL	SR	SPW	SPL	SPR	Qualification
1	(Switzerland) Voléro Zürich	6	6	0	18	18	1	18.000	471	313	1.505	Playoff round
2	(Russia) Uralochka-NTMK Ekaterinburg	6	4	2	10	13	10	1.300	473	462	1.024	Playoff round
3	(Serbia) Vizura Beograd	6	1	5	4	6	15	0.400	409	495	0.826	
4	(France) RC Cannes	6	1	5	4	5	16	0.313	412	495	0.832	

Date	Time		Score		Set 1	Set 2	Set 3	Set 4	Set 5	Total	Report
28 Oct	19:00	Vizura Beograd (Serbia)	3–0	(France) RC Cannes	25–23	25–23	25–15			75–61	Report
29 Oct	20:00	Voléro Zürich (Switzerland)	3–0	(Russia) Uralochka-NTMK Ekaterinburg	25–11	25–18	25–14			75–43	Report
10 Nov	20:00	RC Cannes (France)	0–3	(Switzerland) Voléro Zürich	25–27	17–25	14–25			56–77	Report
11 Nov	19:00	Uralochka-NTMK Ekaterinburg (Russia)	3–0	(Serbia) Vizura Beograd	25–14	25–21	25–19			75–54	Report
25 Nov	19:00	Vizura Beograd (Serbia)	0–3	(Switzerland) Voléro Zürich	17–25	17–25	12–25			46–75	Report
25 Nov	20:30	RC Cannes (France)	2–3	(Russia) Uralochka-NTMK Ekaterinburg	21–25	16–25	25–18	25–22	13–15	100–105	Report
8 Dec	19:00	Uralochka-NTMK Ekaterinburg (Russia)	3–0	(France) RC Cannes	25–19	25–14	25–10			75–43	Report
10 Dec	20:00	Voléro Zürich (Switzerland)	3–0	(Serbia) Vizura Beograd	25–11	25–23	25–16			75–50	Report
21 Jan	19:00	Vizura Beograd (Serbia)	2–3	(Russia) Uralochka-NTMK Ekaterinburg	16–25	20–25	25–21	25–23	10–15	96–109	Report
21 Jan	20:00	Voléro Zürich (Switzerland)	3–0	(France) RC Cannes	25–20	25–19	25–13			75–52	Report
26 Jan	19:00	Uralochka-NTMK Ekaterinburg (Russia)	1–3	(Switzerland) Voléro Zürich	25–19	18–25	11–25	12–25		66–94	Report
27 Jan	20:30	RC Cannes (France)	3–1	(Serbia) Vizura Beograd	26–24	25–17	24–26	25–21		100–88	Report

=== Pool E ===
Pos	Team	Pld	W	L	Pts	SW	SL	SR	SPW	SPL	SPR	Qualification
1	(Turkey) Fenerbahçe Grundig Istanbul	6	6	0	17	18	3	6.000	504	390	1.292	Playoff round
2	(Germany) Dresdner SC	6	3	3	7	11	13	0.846	522	526	0.992	Playoff round
3	(Poland) Impel Wrocław	6	2	4	8	10	13	0.769	477	521	0.916	2015–16 Women's CEV Cup
4	(Azerbaijan) Telekom Baku	6	1	5	4	7	17	0.412	466	532	0.876	

Date	Time		Score		Set 1	Set 2	Set 3	Set 4	Set 5	Total	Report
28 Oct	19:00	Dresdner SC (Germany)	1–3	(Turkey) Fenerbahçe Grundig Istanbul	17–25	24–26	25–19	12–25		78–95	Report
29 Oct	17:00	Telekom Baku (Azerbaijan)	0–3	(Poland) Impel Wrocław	17–25	12–25	24–26			53–76	Report
11 Nov	18:00	Impel Wrocław (Poland)	2–3	(Germany) Dresdner SC	17–25	25–23	26–24	21–25	13–15	102–112	Report
11 Nov	19:00	Fenerbahçe Grundig Istanbul (Turkey)	3–2	(Azerbaijan) Telekom Baku	21–25	22–25	25–22	25–11	15–6	108–89	Report
25 Nov	19:00	Fenerbahçe Grundig Istanbul (Turkey)	3–0	(Poland) Impel Wrocław	25–13	25–10	26–24			76–47	Report
25 Nov	19:00	Dresdner SC (Germany)	3–0	(Azerbaijan) Telekom Baku	25–16	25–21	26–24			76–61	Report
9 Dec	18:00	Impel Wrocław (Poland)	0–3	(Turkey) Fenerbahçe Grundig Istanbul	23–25	22–25	18–25			63–75	Report
10 Dec	17:00	Telekom Baku (Azerbaijan)	2–3	(Germany) Dresdner SC	21–25	25–20	21–25	25–17	7–15	99–102	Report
20 Jan	19:00	Dresdner SC (Germany)	1–3	(Poland) Impel Wrocław	23–25	27–29	25–15	19–25		94–94	Report
21 Jan	17:00	Telekom Baku (Azerbaijan)	0–3	(Turkey) Fenerbahçe Grundig Istanbul	18–25	19–25	16–25			53–75	Report
27 Jan	19:00	Fenerbahçe Grundig Istanbul (Turkey)	3–0	(Germany) Dresdner SC	25–22	25–15	25–23			75–60	Report
27 Jan	20:30	Impel Wrocław (Poland)	2–3	(Azerbaijan) Telekom Baku	18–25	25–23	16–25	25–23	11–15	95–111	Report

=== Pool F ===
Pos	Team	Pld	W	L	Pts	SW	SL	SR	SPW	SPL	SPR	Qualification
1	(Russia) Dinamo Moscow	6	5	1	15	16	3	5.333	455	364	1.250	Playoff round
2	(Italy) Nordmeccanica Piacenza	6	5	1	14	15	6	2.500	485	434	1.118	Playoff round
3	(Romania) CS Volei Alba Blaj	6	2	4	7	8	14	0.571	471	490	0.961	2015–16 Women's CEV Cup
4	(France) Rocheville Le Cannet	6	0	6	0	2	18	0.111	365	488	0.748	

Date	Time		Score		Set 1	Set 2	Set 3	Set 4	Set 5	Total	Report
27 Oct	20:00	Rocheville Le Cannet (France)	1–3	(Romania) CS Volei Alba Blaj	20–25	20–25	25–16	17–25		82–91	Report
29 Oct	20:30	Nordmeccanica Piacenza (Italy)	3–1	(Russia) Dinamo Moscow	25–15	21–25	25–20	25–20		96–80	Report
11 Nov	18:00	CS Volei Alba Blaj (Romania)	0–3	(Italy) Nordmeccanica Piacenza	24–26	18–25	23–25			65–76	Report
12 Nov	19:00	Dinamo Moscow (Russia)	3–0	(France) Rocheville Le Cannet	25–20	25–13	25–17			75–50	Report
25 Nov	19:00	Dinamo Moscow (Russia)	3–0	(Romania) CS Volei Alba Blaj	25–22	25–23	25–18			75–63	Report
26 Nov	20:30	Nordmeccanica Piacenza (Italy)	3–0	(France) Rocheville Le Cannet	25–21	25–15	25–16			75–52	Report
9 Dec	18:00	CS Volei Alba Blaj (Romania)	0–3	(Russia) Dinamo Moscow	18–25	13–25	17–25			48–75	Report
9 Dec	20:00	Rocheville Le Cannet (France)	0–3	(Italy) Nordmeccanica Piacenza	21–25	19–25	15–25			55–75	Report
19 Jan	20:00	Rocheville Le Cannet (France)	0–3	(Russia) Dinamo Moscow	16–25	20–25	14–25			50–75	Report
20 Jan	20:30	Nordmeccanica Piacenza (Italy)	3–2	(Romania) CS Volei Alba Blaj	25–20	16–25	25–22	24–26	16–14	106–107	Report
27 Jan	18:00	CS Volei Alba Blaj (Romania)	3–1	(France) Rocheville Le Cannet	22–25	25–23	25–16	25–12		97–76	Report
27 Jan	19:00	Dinamo Moscow (Russia)	3–0	(Italy) Nordmeccanica Piacenza	25–18	25–17	25–22			75–57	Report

=== Ranking of third-placed teams ===
Pos	Team	Pld	W	L	Pts	SW	SL	SR	SPW	SPL	SPR	Qualification
1	(Poland) Chemik Police	6	4	2	11	13	9	1.444	509	459	1.109	Playoff round
2	(Poland) Impel Wrocław	6	2	4	8	10	13	0.769	477	521	0.916	2015–16 Women's CEV Cup
3	(Italy) Igor Gorgonzola Novara	6	2	4	7	10	12	0.833	488	480	1.017	2015–16 Women's CEV Cup
4	(Romania) CS Volei Alba Blaj	6	2	4	7	8	14	0.571	471	490	0.961	2015–16 Women's CEV Cup
5	(Germany) Allianz MTV Stuttgart	6	2	4	6	6	13	0.462	391	456	0.857	2015–16 Women's CEV Cup
6	(Serbia) Vizura Beograd	6	1	5	4	6	15	0.400	409	495	0.826	

== Playoffs ==
Pool	Winners	Runners-up	Third place
A	(Russia) Dinamo Kazan	(Azerbaijan) Lokomotiv Baku	
B	(Turkey) Vakıfbank Istanbul	(Poland) PGE Atom Trefl Sopot	
C	(Italy) Pomì Casalmaggiore (F4 Hosts)	(Turkey) Eczacıbaşı VitrA Istanbul	(Poland) Chemik Police (Lucky Loser)
D	(Switzerland) Voléro Zürich	(Russia) Uralochka-NTMK Ekaterinburg	
E	(Turkey) Fenerbahçe Grundig Istanbul	(Germany) Dresdner SC	
F	(Russia) Dinamo Moscow	(Italy) Nordmeccanica Piacenza	

- All times are local.

=== Playoff 12 ===
Team 1	Agg.	Team 2	1st leg	2nd leg
Eczacıbaşı VitrA Istanbul (Turkey)	1–5	(Turkey) Vakıfbank Istanbul	2–3	0–3
Lokomotiv Baku (Azerbaijan)	2–4	(Switzerland) Voléro Zürich	3–2	1–3
Chemik Police (Poland)	0–6	(Turkey) Fenerbahçe Grundig Istanbul	0–3	0–3
Dresdner SC (Germany)	0–6	(Russia) Dinamo Moscow	1–3	0–3
Uralochka-NTMK Ekaterinburg (Russia)	0–6	(Russia) Dinamo Kazan	1–3	1–3
PGE Atom Trefl Sopot (Poland)	2–4	(Italy) Nordmeccanica Piacenza	3–2	1–3

==== First leg ====
Date	Time		Score		Set 1	Set 2	Set 3	Set 4	Set 5	Total	Report
9 Feb	20:30	Chemik Police (Poland)	0–3	(Turkey) Fenerbahçe Grundig Istanbul	20–25	18–25	23–25			61–75	Report
10 Feb	18:00	Lokomotiv Baku (Azerbaijan)	3–2	(Switzerland) Voléro Zürich	25–21	22–25	25–23	20–25	16–14	108–108	Report
10 Feb	19:00	Eczacıbaşı VitrA Istanbul (Turkey)	2–3	(Turkey) Vakıfbank Istanbul	25–27	25–18	25–10	14–25	10–15	99–95	Report
10 Feb	19:00	Dresdner SC (Germany)	1–3	(Russia) Dinamo Moscow	31–33	25–21	22–25	11–25		89–104	Report
10 Feb	20:30	PGE Atom Trefl Sopot (Poland)	3–2	(Italy) Nordmeccanica Piacenza	25–18	20–25	25–19	24–26	15–13	109–101	Report
11 Feb	18:30	Uralochka-NTMK Ekaterinburg (Russia)	1–3	(Russia) Dinamo Kazan	21–25	18–25	25–20	10–25		74–95	Report

==== Second leg ====
Date	Time		Score		Set 1	Set 2	Set 3	Set 4	Set 5	Total	Report
23 Feb	19:00	Fenerbahçe Grundig Istanbul (Turkey)	3–0	(Poland) Chemik Police	25–21	25–16	25–14			75–51	Report
24 Feb	18:00	Dinamo Kazan (Russia)	3–1	(Russia) Uralochka-NTMK Ekaterinburg	23–25	25–16	25–21	25–22		98–84	Report
24 Feb	19:30	Dinamo Moscow (Russia)	3–0	(Germany) Dresdner SC	25–17	25–13	25–21			75–51	Report
24 Feb	19:00	Vakıfbank Istanbul (Turkey)	3–0	(Turkey) Eczacıbaşı VitrA Istanbul	25–21	25–18	25–21			75–60	Report
24 Feb	20:30	Nordmeccanica Piacenza (Italy)	3–1	(Poland) PGE Atom Trefl Sopot	25–23	16–25	25–21	25–20		91–89	Report
25 Feb	20:00	Voléro Zürich (Switzerland)	3–1	(Azerbaijan) Lokomotiv Baku	21–25	25–18	25–14	25–19		96–76	Report

=== Playoff 6 ===
Team 1	Agg.	Team 2	1st leg	2nd leg
Vakıfbank Istanbul (Turkey)	5–1	(Switzerland) Voléro Zürich	3–2	3–1
Fenerbahçe Grundig Istanbul (Turkey)	5–1	(Russia) Dinamo Moscow	3–1	3–2
Dinamo Kazan (Russia)	6–0	(Italy) Nordmeccanica Piacenza	3–0	3–0

==== First leg ====
Date	Time		Score		Set 1	Set 2	Set 3	Set 4	Set 5	Total	Report
9 Mar	19:00	Fenerbahçe Grundig Istanbul (Turkey)	3–1	(Russia) Dinamo Moscow	25–21	25–14	21–25	25–19		96–79	Report
10 Mar	19:00	Dinamo Kazan (Russia)	3–0	(Italy) Nordmeccanica Piacenza	25–14	25–23	25–21			75–58	Report
10 Mar	19:00	Vakıfbank Istanbul (Turkey)	3–2	(Switzerland) Voléro Zürich	25–23	25–23	22–25	23–25	15–13	110–109	Report

==== Second leg ====
Date	Time		Score		Set 1	Set 2	Set 3	Set 4	Set 5	Total	Report
22 Mar	19:00	Dinamo Moscow (Russia)	2–3	(Turkey) Fenerbahçe Grundig Istanbul	19–25	26–24	25–19	18–25	9–15	97–108	Report
23 Mar	20:30	Nordmeccanica Piacenza (Italy)	0–3	(Russia) Dinamo Kazan	21–25	22–25	21–25			64–75	Report
24 Mar	20:00	Voléro Zürich (Switzerland)	1–3	(Turkey) Vakıfbank Istanbul	22–25	34–32	21–25	22–25		99–107	Report

== Final four ==
- Organizer: (Italy) Pomì Casalmaggiore
- Venue: PalaGeorge, Montichiari, Italy
- All times are Central European Summer Time (UTC+02:00).
- In case that two teams from the same country qualify for the semifinals, they will have to play each other.

Semifinals
9 April
(Russia) Dinamo Kazan	0
(Italy) Pomì Casalmaggiore	3
9 April
(Turkey) Fenerbahçe Grundig Istanbul	0
(Turkey) Vakıfbank Istanbul	3

Final
10 April
(Italy) Pomì Casalmaggiore	3
(Turkey) Vakıfbank Istanbul	0
3rd place match
10 April
(Russia) Dinamo Kazan	1
(Turkey) Fenerbahçe Grundig Istanbul	3

=== Semifinals ===
Date	Time		Score		Set 1	Set 2	Set 3	Set 4	Set 5	Total	Report
9 Apr	15:30	Fenerbahçe Grundig Istanbul (Turkey)	0–3	(Turkey) Vakıfbank Istanbul	23–25	22–25	22–25			67–75	Report
9 Apr	18:30	Dinamo Kazan (Russia)	0–3	(Italy) Pomì Casalmaggiore	19–25	18–25	19–25			56–75	Report

=== 3rd place match ===
Date	Time		Score		Set 1	Set 2	Set 3	Set 4	Set 5	Total	Report
10 Apr	14:30	Dinamo Kazan (Russia)	1–3	(Turkey) Fenerbahçe Grundig Istanbul	25–20	10–25	18–25	17–25		70–95	Report

=== Final ===
Date	Time		Score		Set 1	Set 2	Set 3	Set 4	Set 5	Total	Report
10 Apr	17:30	Pomì Casalmaggiore (Italy)	3–0	(Turkey) Vakıfbank Istanbul	25–23	25–23	25–22			75–68	Report

== Final standing ==
Rank	Team
1st place, gold medalist(s)	(Italy) Pomì Casalmaggiore
2nd place, silver medalist(s)	(Turkey) VakıfBank Istanbul
3rd place, bronze medalist(s)	(Turkey) Fenerbahçe Grundig Istanbul
4	(Russia) Dinamo Kazan

Qualified for the 2016 FIVB Volleyball Women's Club World Championship

2015–16 Women's Club European Champions

Pomì Casalmaggiore
1st title

Roster for Final Four

Head coach

== Awards ==
- Most valuable player
  (Italy) Francesca Piccinini (Pomì Casalmaggiore)
- Best setter
  (United States) Carli Lloyd (Pomì Casalmaggiore)
- Best outside spikers
  (South Korea) Kim Yeon-Koung (Fenerbahçe Grundig Istanbul)
  (United States) Kimberly Hill (VakıfBank Istanbul)
- Best middle blockers
  (Turkey) Eda Erdem Dündar (Fenerbahçe Grundig Istanbul)
  (Serbia) Jovana Stevanović (Pomì Casalmaggiore)
- Best opposite spiker
  (Germany) Margareta Kozuch (Pomì Casalmaggiore)
- Best libero
  (Turkey) Gizem Örge (VakıfBank Istanbul)
