= 2013 Women's European Volleyball Championship qualification =

The qualification for the 2013 Women's European Volleyball Championship was held from May 11, 2012 to May 27, 2013.

== First round ==
- Dates: May 12–20, 2012
- All times are local.
- In case of a 1–1 tie, teams played a Golden Set to determine the winner.

Team 1	Agg.	Team 2	1st leg	2nd leg
Latvia	2–0	Cyprus	3–0	3–0

=== First leg ===
Date	Time		Score		Set 1	Set 2	Set 3	Set 4	Set 5	Total	Report
12 May	18:00	Latvia	3–0	Cyprus	25–17	25–23	25–13			75–53	Report

=== Second leg ===
Date	Time		Score		Set 1	Set 2	Set 3	Set 4	Set 5	Total	Report
20 May	19:00	Cyprus	0–3	Latvia	12–25	24–26	22–25			58–76	Report

== Second round ==
The six group winners qualified directly for the 2013 Women's European Volleyball Championship, while the six runners-up moved on to the Third Round where three more teams qualified.

Group A	Group B	Group C	Group D	Group E	Group F
Host : Slovakia and Israel Israel; Slovakia; Spain; Sweden	Host : Netherlands and Ukraine Denmark; Greece; Netherlands; Ukraine	Host : Finland and Azerbaijan Austria; Azerbaijan; Belarus; Finland	Host : Romania and Croatia Croatia; Great Britain; Portugal; Romania	Host : Slovenia and Belgium Belgium; France; Montenegro; Slovenia	Host : Bulgaria and Hungary Bulgaria; Czech Republic; Hungary; Latvia

All times are local.

=== Pool A ===
Pos	Team	Pld	W	L	Pts	SW	SL	SR	SPW	SPL	SPR	Qualification
1	Spain	6	5	1	14	17	8	2.125	565	480	1.177	Qualified
2	Slovakia	6	4	2	14	16	6	2.667	536	439	1.221	Third round
3	Israel	6	3	3	8	11	8	1.375	473	488	0.969	Eliminated
4	Sweden	6	0	6	0	0	15	0.000	283	450	0.629	Eliminated

==== Tournament 1 ====
The tournament was held at Aréna Poprad in Poprad, Slovakia.

Date	Time		Score		Set 1	Set 2	Set 3	Set 4	Set 5	Total	Report
6 Sep	16:00	Israel	3–2	Spain	19–25	28–26	18–25	25–21	15–13	105–110	Report
6 Sep	18:30	Slovakia	3–0	Sweden	25–17	25–15	25–11			75–43	Report
7 Sep	16:00	Spain	3–0	Sweden	25–8	25–9	25–16			75–33	Report
7 Sep	18:30	Israel	0–3	Slovakia	16–25	18–25	18–25			52–75	Report
8 Sep	16:00	Sweden	0–3	Israel	16–25	18–25	18–25			52–75	Report
8 Sep	18:00	Slovakia	2–3	Spain	25–16	20–25	25–19	26–28	11–15	107–103	Report

==== Tournament 2 ====
The tournament was held at Metrowest Sport Palace in Ra'anana, Israel.

Date	Time		Score		Set 1	Set 2	Set 3	Set 4	Set 5	Total	Report
13 Sep	16:00	Slovakia	2–3	Spain	24–26	25–21	20–25	25–17	15–17	109–106	Report
13 Sep	18:30	Sweden	0–3	Israel	21–25	22–25	17–25			60–75	Report
14 Sep	16:00	Spain	3–0	Sweden	25–15	25–11	25–20			75–46	Report
14 Sep	18:30	Israel	1–3	Slovakia	22–25	25–20	17–25	22–25		86–95	Report
15 Sep	16:00	Sweden	0–3	Slovakia	20–25	17–25	12–25			49–75	Report
15 Sep	18:30	Israel	1–3	Spain	19–25	17–25	25–21	19–25		80–96	Report

=== Pool B ===
Pos	Team	Pld	W	L	Pts	SW	SL	SR	SPW	SPL	SPR	Qualification
1	Netherlands	6	6	0	17	18	2	9.000	478	332	1.440	Qualified
2	Ukraine	6	4	2	13	14	7	2.000	480	371	1.294	Third round
3	Greece	6	2	4	6	6	12	0.500	340	394	0.863	Eliminated
4	Denmark	6	0	6	0	1	15	0.067	272	473	0.575	Eliminated

==== Tournament 1 ====
The tournament was held at Omnisport Apeldoorn in Apeldoorn, Netherlands.

Date	Time		Score		Set 1	Set 2	Set 3	Set 4	Set 5	Total	Report
7 Sep	18:00	Netherlands	3–0	Denmark	25–12	25–11	25–9			75–32	Report
7 Sep	20:30	Ukraine	3–0	Greece	25–11	25–14	25–17			75–42	Report
8 Sep	16:30	Denmark	0–3	Greece	11–25	14–25	14–25			39–75	Report
8 Sep	19:00	Netherlands	3–0	Ukraine	25–19	25–18	25–22			75–59	Report
9 Sep	15:00	Denmark	1–3	Ukraine	12–25	25–23	15–25	12–25		64–98	Report
9 Sep	17:30	Greece	0–3	Netherlands	20–25	23–25	13–25			56–75	Report

==== Tournament 2 ====
The tournament was held at FSK Olymp in Yuzhne, Ukraine.

Date	Time		Score		Set 1	Set 2	Set 3	Set 4	Set 5	Total	Report
14 Sep	17:00	Greece	0–3	Ukraine	7–25	11–25	19–25			37–75	Report
14 Sep	19:30	Denmark	0–3	Netherlands	12–25	13–25	7–25			32–75	Report
15 Sep	17:00	Ukraine	2–3	Netherlands	25–20	19–25	18–25	25–18	11–15	98–103	Report
15 Sep	19:30	Greece	3–0	Denmark	25–17	25–20	25–18			75–55	Report
16 Sep	17:00	Ukraine	3–0	Denmark	25–20	25–11	25–19			75–50	Report
16 Sep	19:30	Netherlands	3–0	Greece	25–21	25–16	25–18			75–55	Report

=== Pool C ===
Pos	Team	Pld	W	L	Pts	SW	SL	SR	SPW	SPL	SPR	Qualification
1	Azerbaijan	6	6	0	18	18	0	MAX	456	297	1.535	Qualified
2	Belarus	6	4	2	12	12	8	1.500	462	409	1.130	Third round
3	Finland	6	2	4	5	8	14	0.571	448	501	0.894	Eliminated
4	Austria	6	0	6	1	2	15	0.133	341	486	0.702	Eliminated

==== Tournament 1 ====
The tournament was held at Salohalli in Salo, Finland.

Date	Time		Score		Set 1	Set 2	Set 3	Set 4	Set 5	Total	Report
7 Sep	17:00	Azerbaijan	3–0	Austria	25–19	25–17	25–17			75–53	Report
7 Sep	19:30	Finland	1–3	Belarus	10–25	16–25	25–22	13–25		64–97	Report
8 Sep	15:00	Azerbaijan	3–0	Belarus	25–13	25–21	25–11			75–45	Report
8 Sep	18:00	Austria	0–3	Finland	18–25	18–25	15–25			51–75	Report
9 Sep	14:00	Belarus	3–0	Austria	25–21	25–11	25–15			75–47	Report
9 Sep	17:00	Finland	0–3	Azerbaijan	20–25	12–25	11–25			43–75	Report

==== Tournament 2 ====
The tournament was held at Sports Games Palace in Baku, Azerbaijan.

Date	Time		Score		Set 1	Set 2	Set 3	Set 4	Set 5	Total	Report
14 Sep	16:00	Austria	0–3	Belarus	18–25	18–25	13–25			49–75	Report
14 Sep	18:30	Azerbaijan	3–0	Finland	25–23	25–19	25–20			75–62	Report
15 Sep	16:00	Belarus	3–1	Finland	26–24	25–19	23–25	27–25		101–93	Report
15 Sep	18:30	Austria	0–3	Azerbaijan	11–25	16–25	12–25			39–75	Report
16 Sep	16:00	Finland	3–2	Austria	25–16	20–25	18–25	33–31	15–5	111–102	Report
16 Sep	18:30	Azerbaijan	3–0	Belarus	31–29	25–20	25–20			81–69	Report

=== Pool D ===
Pos	Team	Pld	W	L	Pts	SW	SL	SR	SPW	SPL	SPR	Qualification
1	Croatia	6	5	1	15	16	3	5.333	458	336	1.363	Qualified
2	Romania	6	5	1	15	15	5	3.000	485	387	1.253	Third round
3	Great Britain	6	2	4	6	7	12	0.583	416	466	0.893	Eliminated
4	Portugal	6	0	6	0	0	18	0.000	287	455	0.631	Eliminated

==== Tournament 1 ====
The tournament was held at Sala Polivalentă in Piatra Neamţ, Romania.

Date	Time		Score		Set 1	Set 2	Set 3	Set 4	Set 5	Total	Report
6 Sep	17:00	Croatia	3–0	Great Britain	25–21	25–18	25–20			75–59	Report
6 Sep	19:30	Romania	3–0	Portugal	25–17	25–18	25–11			75–46	Report
7 Sep	16:30	Great Britain	3–0	Portugal	25–23	25–22	30–28			80–73	Report
7 Sep	19:00	Romania	3–1	Croatia	25–12	25–22	20–25	26–24		96–83	Report
8 Sep	16:30	Portugal	0–3	Croatia	13–25	7–25	7–25			27–75	Report
8 Sep	19:00	Great Britain	1–3	Romania	28–26	23–25	18–25	22–25		91–101	Report

==== Tournament 2 ====
The tournament was held at Valbruna in Rovinj, Croatia.

Date	Time		Score		Set 1	Set 2	Set 3	Set 4	Set 5	Total	Report
13 Sep	16:30	Portugal	0–3	Romania	15–25	12–25	10–25			37–75	Report
13 Sep	19:00	Croatia	3–0	Great Britain	25–12	25–21	25–21			75–54	Report
14 Sep	16:30	Romania	3–0	Great Britain	25–21	25–17	25–17			75–55	Report
14 Sep	19:00	Portugal	0–3	Croatia	13–25	14–25	10–25			37–75	Report
15 Sep	16:30	Great Britain	3–0	Portugal	25–22	27–25	25–20			77–67	Report
15 Sep	19:00	Croatia	3–0	Romania	25–20	25–23	25–20			75–63	Report

=== Pool E ===
Pos	Team	Pld	W	L	Pts	SW	SL	SR	SPW	SPL	SPR	Qualification
1	Belgium	6	5	1	15	16	3	5.333	464	340	1.365	Qualified
2	France	6	5	1	15	15	4	3.750	463	360	1.286	Third round
3	Slovenia	6	2	4	6	6	12	0.500	372	399	0.932	Eliminated
4	Montenegro	6	0	6	0	0	18	0.000	252	452	0.558	Eliminated

==== Tournament 1 ====
The tournament was held at Ljudski vrt Sports Hall in Maribor, Slovenia.

Date	Time		Score		Set 1	Set 2	Set 3	Set 4	Set 5	Total	Report
7 Sep	17:00	France	3–0	Slovenia	25–17	25–20	25–21			75–58	Report
7 Sep	20:00	Montenegro	0–3	Belgium	13–25	14–25	11–25			38–75	Report
8 Sep	17:00	Slovenia	3–0	Montenegro	25–11	25–18	25–12			75–41	Report
8 Sep	20:00	Belgium	1–3	France	23–25	18–25	25–20	20–25		86–95	Report
9 Sep	17:00	Slovenia	0–3	Belgium	20–25	18–25	17–25			55–75	Report
9 Sep	20:00	Montenegro	0–3	France	14–25	6–25	14–25			34–75	Report

==== Tournament 2 ====
The tournament will be held at Sportcampus Lange Munte in Kortrijk, Belgium.

Date	Time		Score		Set 1	Set 2	Set 3	Set 4	Set 5	Total	Report
14 Sep	17:00	Montenegro	0–3	Slovenia	25–27	11–25	22–25			58–77	Report
14 Sep	20:30	France	0–3	Belgium	19–25	24–26	25–27			68–78	Report
15 Sep	17:00	Slovenia	0–3	France	20–25	23–25	16–25			59–75	Report
15 Sep	20:30	Belgium	3–0	Montenegro	25–5	25–18	25–13			75–36	Report
16 Sep	15:00	France	3–0	Montenegro	25–22	25–13	25–10			75–45	Report
16 Sep	18:30	Belgium	3–0	Slovenia	25–18	25–15	25–15			75–48	Report

=== Pool F ===
Pos	Team	Pld	W	L	Pts	SW	SL	SR	SPW	SPL	SPR	Qualification
1	Bulgaria	6	6	0	16	18	4	4.500	507	389	1.303	Qualified
2	Czech Republic	6	4	2	14	16	7	2.286	525	398	1.319	Third round
3	Hungary	6	2	4	6	7	14	0.500	408	487	0.838	Eliminated
4	Latvia	6	0	6	0	2	18	0.111	328	494	0.664	Eliminated

==== Tournament 1 ====
The tournament was held at Palace of Culture and Sports in Varna, Bulgaria.

Date	Time		Score		Set 1	Set 2	Set 3	Set 4	Set 5	Total	Report
7 Sep	15:30	Hungary	0–3	Czech Republic	17–25	8–25	12–25			37–75	Report
7 Sep	18:00	Bulgaria	3–0	Latvia	25–12	25–10	25–15			75–37	Report
8 Sep	15:30	Czech Republic	3–0	Latvia	25–15	25–20	25–11			75–46	Report
8 Sep	18:00	Bulgaria	3–0	Hungary	25–13	25–18	25–16			75–47	Report
9 Sep	15:30	Latvia	1–3	Hungary	20–25	17–25	28–26	21–25		86–101	Report
9 Sep	18:00	Czech Republic	2–3	Bulgaria	25–14	22–25	20–25	25–23	9–15	101–102	Report

==== Tournament 2 ====
The tournament was held at Bvuss in Budaörs, Hungary.

Date	Time		Score		Set 1	Set 2	Set 3	Set 4	Set 5	Total	Report
13 Sep	16:00	Czech Republic	2–3	Bulgaria	25–23	25–17	22–25	19–25	12–15	103–105	Report
13 Sep	19:00	Latvia	1–3	Hungary	21–25	25–18	18–25	16–25		80–93	Report
14 Sep	15:30	Bulgaria	3–0	Latvia	25–14	25–18	25–10			75–42	Report
14 Sep	18:00	Czech Republic	3–1	Hungary	21–25	25–16	25–17	25–13		96–71	Report
15 Sep	16:00	Latvia	0–3	Czech Republic	14–25	10–25	13–25			37–75	Report
15 Sep	19:00	Hungary	0–3	Bulgaria	20–25	19–25	20–25			59–75	Report

== Third round ==
- Dates: May 31 – June 9, 2013
- All times are local.
- In case of a 1–1 tie, teams played a Golden Set to determine the winner.

Team 1	Agg.	Team 2	1st leg	2nd leg
Ukraine	1–1^{1}	France	3–1	2–3
Romania	0–2	Czech Republic	0–3	1–3
Belarus	1–1^{2}	Slovakia	3–0	1–3

- ^{1} France won the golden set 15–11.
- ^{2} Belarus won the golden set 16–14.

=== First leg ===
Date	Time		Score		Set 1	Set 2	Set 3	Set 4	Set 5	Total	Report
1 Jun	17:00	Ukraine	3–1	France	25–23	25–17	24–26	30–28		104–94	Report
1 Jun	18:00	Romania	0–3	Czech Republic	17–25	19–25	25–27			61–77	Report
1 Jun	18:00	Belarus	3–0	Slovakia	25–19	25–10	25–17			75–46	Report

=== Second leg ===
Date	Time		Score		Set 1	Set 2	Set 3	Set 4	Set 5	Total	Report
6 Jun	19:00	Slovakia	3–1	Belarus	15–25	25–19	25–17	25–20		90–81	Report
8 Jun	18:00	Czech Republic	3–1	Romania	25–11	25–18	23–25	25–22		98–76	Report
8 Jun	20:00	France	3–2	Ukraine	20–25	25–23	25–20	18–25	15–8	103–101	Report
