= Daria Stolyarova =

Russian volleyball player

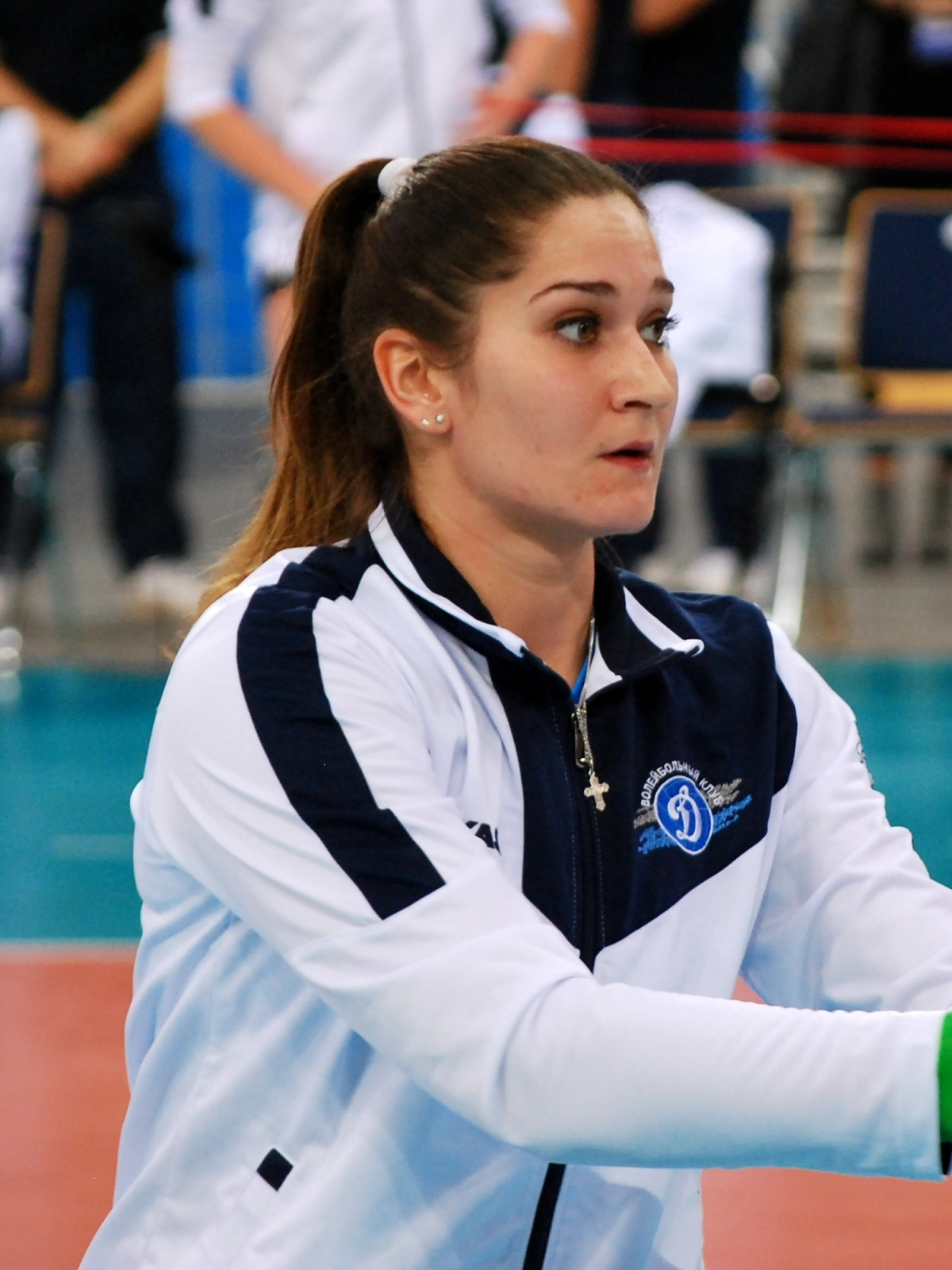

Personal information
- Full name: Daria Leonidovna Stolyarova
- Nationality: Russian
- Born: 29 March 1990 (age 36); Moscow, Soviet Union
- Height: 1.86 m (6 ft 1 in)
- Weight: 75 kg (165 lb)
- Spike: 310 cm (120 in)
- Block: 304 cm (120 in)

Volleyball information
- Position: Opposite
- Current club: (Russia) WVC Dynamo Kazan
- Number: 9

Daria Leonidovna Stolyarova (2012–2015 Isaeva, Russian: Дарья Леонидовна Столярова, born 29 March 1990 in Moscow) is a Russian volleyball player, who plays as an opposite. She was a member of the Women's National Team. She plays for Dynamo Kazan.

== Clubs ==
- (Russia) Zarechie Odintsovo (2008–2013)
- (Russia) Fakel Novy Ourengoï (2013–2014)
- (Russia) Omichka Omsk Region (2014–2015)
- (Russia) WVC Dynamo Kazan (2015-)

== Awards ==
=== Individuals ===
- 2013 Montreux Volley Masters "Best Server"
- Master of Sports of Russia
