= 2015–16 Women's CEV Cup =

- League: Women's CEV Cup
- Sport: Volleyball

Finals
- Champions: (Russia) Dinamo Krasnodar
- Runners-up: (Turkey) Galatasaray Daikin Istanbul
- Finals MVP: (Russia) Natalia Malykh

Women's CEV Cup seasons
- ← 2014–15 2016–17 →

The 2015–16 Women's CEV Cup was the 44th edition of the European CEV Cup volleyball club tournament, the former "Top Teams Cup".

== Participating teams ==
The number of participants on the basis of ranking list for European Cup Competitions. The list shows the participating teams at the start of the competition, four more teams joined later during the Challenge phase.

Rank	Country	Number of teams	Teams (rankings in 2014–15 national championships)
1	Turkey	1	Galatasaray Daikin Istanbul (4)
2	Russia	1	Dinamo Krasnodar (5)
3	France	2	Nantes VB; SF Paris Saint Cloud
4	Azerbaijan	1	Azeryol Baku
5	Poland	1	Polski Cukier Muszyna
6	Germany	2	VBC Wiesbaden; Schweriner SC
7	Italy	0	
8	Romania	2	Ştiinţa Bacău; CSM Targoviste
9	Switzerland	2	Viteos Neuchâtel Université; Volley Köniz
10	Czech Republic	2	Královo Pole Brno; SK UP Olomouc
11	Serbia	2	Crvena Zvezda Beograd; NIS Spartak Subotica
12	Slovenia	1	Nova KBM Branik Maribor
	Belgium	3	VDK Gent Dames; Dauphines Charleroi; Hermes Oostende
	Finland	3	HPK Hämeenlinna; LP Salo; LP Kangasala
	Netherlands	2	VC Sneek; Eurosped Tvt Almelo
	Bulgaria	1	Maritza Plovdiv
	Cyprus	1	Apollon Prestige Limassol
	Estonia	1	Kohila VC
	Greece	1	Olympiacos Piraeus
	Hungary	1	Linamar Békéscsabai RSE
	Israel	1	Haifa Volleyball
	Ukraine	1	Khimik Yuzhny

== Main phase ==
=== 16th Final ===
- 1st leg 27–29 October 2015
- 2nd leg 10–12 November 2015

The losing teams of this stage qualified to the CEV Women's Challenge Cup main phase.

Match#	Team #1	Results	Team #2
1	Viteos Neuchâtel Université (Switzerland)	2 – 3; 0 – 3	(Turkey) Galatasaray Daikin Istanbul
2	VDK Gent Dames (Belgium)	1 – 3; 3 – 0 Golden Set: 15–10	(Netherlands) VC Sneek
3	Královo Pole Brno (Czech Republic)	2 – 3; 0 – 3	(Serbia) Crvena Zvezda Beograd
4	Volley Köniz (Switzerland)	3 – 1; 2 – 3	(Finland) HPK Hämeenlinna
5	VBC Wiesbaden (Germany)	3 – 2; 0 – 3	(Poland) Polski Cukier Muszyna
6	Kohila VC (Estonia)	0 – 3; 0 – 3	(Slovenia) Nova KBM Branik Maribor
7	LP Salo (Finland)	3 – 0; 3 – 0	(Israel) Haifa Volleyball
8	CSM Targoviste (Romania)	3 – 0; 0 – 3 Golden Set: 13–15	(Azerbaijan) Azeryol Baku
9	SF Paris Saint Cloud (France)	2 – 3; 3 – 2 Golden Set: 9–15	(Finland) LP Kangasala
10	Nantes VB (France)	3 – 2; 0 – 3	(Ukraine) Khimik Yuzhny
11	Dauphines Charleroi (Belgium)	0 – 3; 1 – 3	(Bulgaria) Maritza Plovdiv
12	Schweriner SC (Germany)	3 – 0; 2 – 3	(Czech Republic) SK UP Olomouc
13	Ştiinţa Bacău (Romania)	3 – 0; 3 – 1	(Cyprus) Apollon Prestige Limassol
14	NIS Spartak Subotica (Serbia)	3 – 0; 3 – 2	(Netherlands) Eurosped Tvt Almelo
15	Linamar Békéscsabai RSE (Hungary)	3 – 1; 3 – 1	(Greece) Olympiacos Piraeus
16	Hermes Oostende (Belgium)	1 – 3; 0 – 3	(Russia) Dinamo Krasnodar

=== 8th Final ===
- 1st leg 8–10 December 2015
- 2nd leg 15–17 December 2015

Match#	Team #1	Results	Team #2
17	Galatasaray Daikin Istanbul (Turkey)	3 – 0; 3 – 1	(Belgium) VDK Gent Dames
18	Volley Köniz (Switzerland)	3 – 1; 3 – 0	(Serbia) Crvena Zvezda Beograd
19	Polski Cukier Muszyna (Poland)	3 – 1; 3 – 2	(Slovenia) Nova KBM Branik Maribor
20	LP Salo (Finland)	0 – 3; 2 – 3	(Azerbaijan) Azeryol Baku
21	LP Kangasala (Finland)	1 – 3; 3 – 1 Golden set: 12–15	(Ukraine) Khimik Yuzhny
22	Maritza Plovdiv (Bulgaria)	1 – 3; 0 – 3	(Germany) Schweriner SC
23	NIS Spartak Subotica (Serbia)	1 – 3; 0 – 3	(Romania) Ştiinţa Bacău
24	Dinamo Krasnodar (Russia)	3 – 0; 3 – 0	(Hungary) Linamar Békéscsabai RSE

=== 4th Final ===
- 1st leg 19–21 January 2016
- 2nd leg 26–28 January 2016

Match#	Team #1	Results	Team #2
25	Galatasaray Daikin Istanbul (Turkey)	3 – 0; 3 – 1	(Switzerland) Volley Köniz
26	Polski Cukier Muszyna (Poland)	3 – 2; 0 – 3	(Azerbaijan) Azeryol Baku
27	Khimik Yuzhny (Ukraine)	0 – 3; 1 – 3	(Germany) Schweriner SC
28	Ştiinţa Bacău (Romania)	0 – 3; 1 – 3	(Russia) Dinamo Krasnodar

== Challenge phase ==
In this stage of the competition, the four qualified teams of the Main phase were joined by the four teams with best third-placed finish from the 2015–16 CEV Women's Champions League pool stage. The following teams competed at this stage of the competition.

Qualified via the Main phase	Qualified via Champions League
(Turkey) Galatasaray Daikin Istanbul	(Poland) Impel Wrocław
(Azerbaijan) Azeryol Baku	(Italy) Igor Gorgonzola Novara
(Germany) Schweriner SC	(Romania) CS Volei Alba Blaj
(Russia) Dinamo Krasnodar	(Germany) Allianz MTV Stuttgart

- 1st leg 9–11 February 2016
- 2nd leg 23–25 February 2016

Match#	Team #1	Results	Team #2
29	Galatasaray Daikin Istanbul (Turkey)	3 – 1; 3 – 1	(Poland) Impel Wrocław
30	CS Volei Alba Blaj (Romania)	0 – 3; 0 – 3	(Germany) Schweriner SC
31	Dinamo Krasnodar (Russia)	3 – 0; 3 – 0	(Germany) Allianz MTV Stuttgart
32	Azeryol Baku (Azerbaijan)	3 – 1; 1 – 3 Golden set: 15–13	(Italy) Igor Gorgonzola Novara

== Final phase ==
=== Semifinals ===
- 1st leg 8 March 2016
- 2nd leg 12 March 2016

Match#	Team #1	Results	Team #2
33	Schweriner SC (Germany)	0 – 3; 0 – 3	(Turkey) Galatasaray Daikin Istanbul
34	Dinamo Krasnodar (Russia)	3 – 0; 3 – 0	(Azerbaijan) Azeryol Baku

=== Finals ===
- 1st leg 29 March 2016
- 2nd leg 2 April 2016

Match#	Team #1	Results	Team #2
35	Galatasaray Daikin Istanbul (Turkey)	3 – 2; 0 – 3	(Russia) Dinamo Krasnodar

== Awards ==
Award	Winner	Team
MVP	(Russia) Natalia Malykh	(Russia) Dinamo Krasnodar
Spiker	(Russia) Natalia Malykh	(Russia) Dinamo Krasnodar
Server	(Turkey) Aslı Kalaç	(Turkey) Galatasaray Daikin Istanbul
Receiver	(Russia) Alexandra Pasynkova	(Russia) Dinamo Krasnodar
Blocker	(Russia) Liubov Shashkova	(Russia) Dinamo Krasnodar
