= 2014 Montreux Volley Masters =

Women's volleyball tournament

Tournament details
- Host country: Switzerland
- Dates: May 27 – June 1
- Teams: 8
- Venue: 1 (in 1 host city)

Final positions
- Champions: Germany (1st title)

Tournament awards
- MVP: Margareta Kozuch (GER)

The 2014 Montreux Volley Masters was a women's volleyball competition held in Montreux, Switzerland between May 27 – June 1, 2014. Eight teams participated in this tournament.

Germany defeated United States to win their first title, with Margareta Kozuch being awarded Most Valuable Player.

== Participating teams ==
Group A	Group B
Brazil (Defending champion); China; Russia; Switzerland (Host)	Dominican Republic; Germany; Japan; United States

== Group stage ==
=== Group A ===
Pos	Team	Pld	W	L	Pts	SW	SL	SR	SPW	SPL	SPR	Qualification
1	China	3	2	1	6	8	5	1.600	285	253	1.126	Semifinals
2	Russia	3	2	1	6	8	5	1.600	295	268	1.101	Semifinals
3	Brazil	3	2	1	6	8	5	1.600	295	273	1.081	
4	Switzerland	3	0	3	0	0	9	0.000	144	225	0.640	

Date	Time		Score		Set 1	Set 2	Set 3	Set 4	Set 5	Total	Report
27 May	16:30	Brazil	3–0	Switzerland	25–13	25–20	25–13			75–46	Report
27 May	21:00	China	3–2	Russia	25–22	23–25	16–25	25–18	15–9	104–99	Report
28 May	18:30	Brazil	3–2	China	25–19	14–25	23–25	26–24	15–13	103–106	Report
29 May	16:30	China	3–0	Switzerland	25–16	25–22	25–13			75–51	Report
29 May	18:30	Russia	3–2	Brazil	35–33	25–20	26–28	20–25	15–11	121–117	Report
30 May	16:30	Russia	3–0	Switzerland	25–19	25–13	25–15			75–47	Report

=== Group B ===
Pos	Team	Pld	W	L	Pts	SW	SL	SR	SPW	SPL	SPR	Qualification
1	United States	3	3	0	9	9	1	9.000	247	196	1.260	Semifinals
2	Germany	3	2	1	6	7	3	2.333	241	215	1.121	Semifinals
3	Japan	3	1	2	3	3	6	0.500	191	218	0.876	
4	Dominican Republic	3	0	3	0	0	9	0.000	176	226	0.779	

Date	Time		Score		Set 1	Set 2	Set 3	Set 4	Set 5	Total	Report
27 May	18:30	United States	3–1	Germany	22–25	25–20	25–23	25–21		97–89	Report
28 May	16:30	Germany	3–0	Dominican Republic	25–21	25–20	25–21			75–62	Report
28 May	21:00	United States	3–0	Japan	25–17	25–22	25–20			75–59	Report
29 May	21:00	Japan	3–0	Dominican Republic	26–24	25–19	25–23			76–66	Report
30 May	18:30	Japan	0–3	Germany	15–25	25–27	16–25			56–77	Report
30 May	21:00	Dominican Republic	0–3	United States	19–25	15–25	14–25			48–75	Report

== Classification round ==
5th–8th place
31 May 2014 – Montreux
Brazil	3
Dominican Republic	0
31 May 2014 – Montreux
Japan	3
Switzerland	0

5th place
1 June 2014 – Montreux
Brazil	3
Japan	1

=== 5th–8th place ===
Date	Time		Score		Set 1	Set 2	Set 3	Set 4	Set 5	Total	Report
31 May	14:00	Brazil	3–0	Dominican Republic	27–25	25–16	27–25			79–66	Report
31 May	16:00	Japan	3–0	Switzerland	25–17	25–16	25–19			75–52	Report

=== 5th place match ===
Date	Time		Score		Set 1	Set 2	Set 3	Set 4	Set 5	Total	Report
1 Jun	11:00	Brazil	3–1	Japan	19–25	25–20	25–11	25–22		94–78	Report

== Final round ==
Semifinals
31 May 2014 – Montreux
China	0
Germany	3
31 May 2014 – Montreux
United States	3
Russia	1

Final
1 June 2014 – Montreux
Germany	3
United States	1
3rd place
1 June 2014 – Montreux
China	2
Russia	3

=== Semifinals ===
Date	Time		Score		Set 1	Set 2	Set 3	Set 4	Set 5	Total	Report
31 May	18:30	China	0–3	Germany	22–25	18–25	21–25			61–75	Report
31 May	21:00	United States	3–1	Russia	25–23	22–25	25–20	25–21		97–89	Report

=== Third place match ===
Date	Time		Score		Set 1	Set 2	Set 3	Set 4	Set 5	Total	Report
1 Jun	13:30	China	2–3	Russia	25–19	19–25	25–17	22–25	11–15	102–101	Report

=== Final ===
Date	Time		Score		Set 1	Set 2	Set 3	Set 4	Set 5	Total	Report
1 Jun	16:00	Germany	3–1	United States	25–19	19–25	25–17	25–21		94–82	Report

== Final standings ==
Rank	Team
1st place, gold medalist(s)	Germany
2nd place, silver medalist(s)	United States
3rd place, bronze medalist(s)	Russia
4	China
5	Brazil
6	Japan
7	Dominican Republic
7	Switzerland

== Awards ==
- MVP: Margareta Kozuch (GER)
- Best scorer: Natalia Malykh (RUS)
- Best spiker: Maren Brinker (GER)
- Best blocker: Ana Carolina da Silva (BRA)
- Best setter: Ekaterina Kosianenko (RUS)
- Best server: Rachael Adams (USA)
- Best receiver: Yana Shcherban (RUS)
- Best libero: Lenka Dürr (GER)
