= 2013 Montreux Volley Masters =

Women's volleyball tournament

Tournament details
- Host country: Switzerland
- Dates: May 28 – June 2
- Teams: 8
- Venue: 1 (in 1 host city)

Final positions
- Champions: Brazil (6th title)

Tournament awards
- MVP: Fernanda Garay (BRA)

The 2013 Montreux Volley Masters was held in Montreux, Switzerland between May 28 – June 2, 2013. Eight teams participated in this tournament.

The tournament returned after being cancelled in 2012 due to the 2012 Summer Olympics. Brazil defeated Russia to win their sixth title, with Fernanda Garay being awarded Most Valuable Player.

== Participating teams ==
Group A	Group B
Switzerland (Host); Brazil; China; Russia	Japan (Defending champion); Italy; Dominican Republic; Germany

== Group stage ==
=== Group A ===
Pos	Team	Pld	W	L	Pts	SW	SL	SR	SPW	SPL	SPR	Qualification
1	Brazil	3	3	0	9	9	0	MAX	227	178	1.275	Semifinals
2	Russia	3	2	1	6	6	4	1.500	233	206	1.131	Semifinals
3	China	3	1	2	3	4	6	0.667	225	235	0.957	
4	Switzerland	3	0	3	0	0	9	0.000	159	225	0.707	

Date	Time		Score		Set 1	Set 2	Set 3	Set 4	Set 5	Total	Report
28 May	18:30	China	1–3	Russia	22–25	18–25	28–26	15–25		83–101	Report
28 May	21:00	Brazil	3–0	Switzerland	25–21	25–23	25–10			75–54	Report
29 May	18:30	Brazil	3–0	China	25–19	27–25	25–23			77–67	Report
30 May	16:30	China	3–0	Switzerland	25–22	25–17	25–18			75–57	Report
30 May	18:30	Russia	0–3	Brazil	14–25	20–25	23–25			57–75	Report
31 May	16:30	Russia	3–0	Switzerland	25–9	25–22	25–17			75–48	Report

=== Group B ===
Pos	Team	Pld	W	L	Pts	SW	SL	SR	SPW	SPL	SPR	Qualification
1	Italy	3	2	1	7	8	3	2.667	260	225	1.156	Semifinals
2	Dominican Republic	3	2	1	6	6	4	1.500	231	208	1.111	Semifinals
3	Japan	3	2	1	5	6	6	1.000	264	265	0.996	
4	Germany	3	0	3	0	2	9	0.222	214	271	0.790	

Date	Time		Score		Set 1	Set 2	Set 3	Set 4	Set 5	Total	Report
28 May	16:30	Japan	0–3	Dominican Republic	19–25	16–25	22–25			57–75	Report
29 May	16:30	Dominican Republic	3–1	Germany	25–15	21–25	25–20	25–16		96–76	Report
29 May	21:00	Japan	3–2	Italy	21–25	27–25	25–21	21–25	15–12	109–108	Report
30 May	21:00	Italy	3–0	Germany	25–11	27–25	25–20			77–56	Report
31 May	18:30	Italy	3–0	Dominican Republic	25–23	25–17	25–20			75–60	Report
31 May	21:00	Germany	1–3	Japan	21–25	25–23	22–25	14–25		82–98	Report

== Classification round ==
5th–8th place
1 June 2013 – Montreux
China	3
Germany	0
1 June 2013 – Montreux
Japan	3
Switzerland	0

5th place
2 June 2013 – Montreux
China	1
Japan	3

=== 5th–8th place ===
Date	Time		Score		Set 1	Set 2	Set 3	Set 4	Set 5	Total	Report
1 Jun	14:00	China	3–0	Germany	25–19	25–19	25–21			75–59	Report
1 Jun	16:00	Japan	3–0	Switzerland	25–20	25–15	25–14			75–49	Report

=== 5th place match ===
Date	Time		Score		Set 1	Set 2	Set 3	Set 4	Set 5	Total	Report
2 Jun	11:00	China	1–3	Japan	20–25	25–27	25–13	19–25		89–90	Report

== Final round ==
Semifinals
1 June 2013 – Montreux
Brazil	3
Dominican Republic	0
1 June 2013 – Montreux
Italy	2
Russia	3

Final
2 June 2013 – Montreux
Brazil	3
Russia	0
3rd place
2 June 2013 – Montreux
Dominican Republic	3
Italy	1

=== Semifinals ===
Date	Time		Score		Set 1	Set 2	Set 3	Set 4	Set 5	Total	Report
1 Jun	18:30	Brazil	3–0	Dominican Republic	25–19	25–18	32–30			82–67	Report
1 Jun	21:00	Italy	2–3	Russia	23–25	25–21	23–25	25–13	11–15	107–99	Report

=== Third place match ===
Date	Time		Score		Set 1	Set 2	Set 3	Set 4	Set 5	Total	Report
2 Jun	13:30	Dominican Republic	3–1	Italy	15–25	25–22	25–18	26–24		91–89	Report

=== Final ===
Date	Time		Score		Set 1	Set 2	Set 3	Set 4	Set 5	Total	Report
2 Jun	16:00	Brazil	3–0	Russia	25–23	25–23	25–22			75–68	Report

== Final standings ==
Rank	Team
1st place, gold medalist(s)	Brazil
2nd place, silver medalist(s)	Russia
3rd place, bronze medalist(s)	Dominican Republic
4	Italy
5	Japan
6	China
7	Germany
7	Switzerland

== Awards ==
- MVP: Fernanda Garay (BRA)
- Best scorer: Zhu Ting (CHN)
- Best spiker: Miyu Nagaoka (JPN)
- Best blocker: Irina Zaryazhko (RUS)
- Best setter: Dani Lins (BRA)
- Best server: Daria Isaeva (RUS)
- Best receiver: Monica De Gennaro (ITA)
- Best libero: Wang Mengjie (CHN)
