= Volleyball at the 2013 Summer Universiade – Women's tournament =

Women's indoor volleyball at the XXVII Summer Universiade
- Venue: various
- Dates: 8–15 July
- Teams: 15

Medalists
1st place, gold medalist(s)		Russia (RUS)
2nd place, silver medalist(s)		Brazil (BRA)
3rd place, bronze medalist(s)		Thailand (THA)

The women's tournament of volleyball at the 2013 Summer Universiade was held from 8 to 15 July in Kazan, Russia.

== Preliminary round ==
The draw is as follows:

=== Group A ===
Pos	Team	Pld	W	L	Pts	SW	SL	SR	SPW	SPL	SPR	Qualification
1	Russia	3	3	0	9	9	0	MAX	225	154	1.461	Quarterfinals
2	Poland	3	2	1	6	6	3	2.000	196	187	1.048	Quarterfinals
3	Czech Republic	3	1	2	3	3	6	0.500	188	203	0.926	9th–15th place
4	United States	3	0	3	0	0	9	0.000	162	227	0.714	9th–15th place

Date	Time		Score		Set 1	Set 2	Set 3	Set 4	Set 5	Total	Report
8 July	18:00	Russia	3–0	Czech Republic	25–17	25–17	25–16			75–50	P2 P3
8 July	20:00	Poland	3–0	United States	25–17	25–14	25–20			75–51	P2 P3
9 July	18:00	Russia	3–0	Poland	25–16	25–15	25–15			75–46	P2 P3
9 July	20:00	Czech Republic	3–0	United States	25–14	27–25	25–14			77–53	P2 P3
10 July	18:00	United States	0–3	Russia	16–25	23–25	19–25			58–75	P2 P3
10 July	18:00	Poland	3–0	Czech Republic	25–23	25–16	25–22			75–61	P2 P3

=== Group B ===
Pos	Team	Pld	W	L	Pts	SW	SL	SR	SPW	SPL	SPR	Qualification
1	Brazil	2	2	0	6	6	0	MAX	150	91	1.648	Quarterfinals
2	Canada	2	1	1	3	3	3	1.000	118	129	0.915	Quarterfinals
3	Norway	2	0	2	0	0	6	0.000	102	150	0.680	9th–15th place

Date	Time		Score		Set 1	Set 2	Set 3	Set 4	Set 5	Total	Report
8 July	15:00	Canada	3–0	Norway	25–21	25–14	25–19			75–54	P2 P3
9 July	15:00	Norway	0–3	Brazil	20–25	17–25	11–25			48–75	P2 P3
10 July	15:00	Brazil	3–0	Canada	25–15	25–15	25–13			75–43	P2 P3

=== Group C ===
Pos	Team	Pld	W	L	Pts	SW	SL	SR	SPW	SPL	SPR	Qualification
1	North Korea	3	3	0	9	9	0	MAX	225	149	1.510	Quarterfinals
2	Chinese Taipei	3	2	1	5	6	5	1.200	232	238	0.975	Quarterfinals
3	Slovakia	3	1	2	4	5	7	0.714	239	274	0.872	9th–15th place
4	China	3	0	3	0	1	9	0.111	213	248	0.859	9th–15th place

Date	Time		Score		Set 1	Set 2	Set 3	Set 4	Set 5	Total	Report
8 July	15:00	North Korea	3–0	Slovakia	25–14	25–15	25–17			75–46	P2 P3
8 July	15:00	Chinese Taipei	3–0	China	25–20	25–21	27–25			77–66	P2 P3
9 July	18:00	Chinese Taipei	0–3	North Korea	21–25	18–25	10–25			49–75	P2 P3
9 July	20:00	China	1–3	Slovakia	22–25	25–18	20–25	26–28		93–96	P2 P3
10 July	15:00	North Korea	3–0	China	25–16	25–17	25–21			75–54	P2 P3
10 July	20:00	Slovakia	2–3	Chinese Taipei	25–20	14–25	25–21	21–25	12–15	97–106	P2 P3

=== Group D ===
Pos	Team	Pld	W	L	Pts	SW	SL	SR	SPW	SPL	SPR	Qualification
1	Thailand	3	3	0	9	9	0	MAX	231	141	1.638	Quarterfinals
2	Japan	3	2	1	6	6	3	2.000	222	156	1.423	Quarterfinals
3	Chile	3	1	2	3	3	7	0.429	171	237	0.722	9th–15th place
4	Hong Kong	3	0	3	0	1	9	0.111	159	249	0.639	9th–15th place

Date	Time		Score		Set 1	Set 2	Set 3	Set 4	Set 5	Total	Report
8 July	18:00	Chile	0–3	Japan	13–25	14–25	8–25			35–75	P2 P3
8 July	20:00	Thailand	3–0	Hong Kong	25–9	25–7	25–16			75–32	P2 P3
9 July	18:00	Thailand	3–0	Chile	25–11	25–13	25–13			75–37	P2 P3
9 July	20:00	Hong Kong	0–3	Japan	12–25	10–25	18–25			40–75	P2 P3
10 July	18:00	Japan	0–3	Thailand	26–28	26–28	20–25			72–81	P2 P3
10 July	20:00	Chile	3–1	Hong Kong	29–27	20–25	25–18	25–17		99–87	P2 P3

== Classification rounds ==
=== Quarterfinal round ===
==== 9th–15th place ====
Date	Time		Score		Set 1	Set 2	Set 3	Set 4	Set 5	Total	Report
12 July	15:00	Czech Republic	3–2	China	23–25	25–15	19–25	25–15	15–11	107–91	P2 P3
12 July	18:00	Slovakia	3–0	United States	25–10	25–18	25–19			75–47	P2 P3
12 July	20:00	Norway	1–3	Hong Kong	26–28	25–22	22–25	23–25		96–100	P2 P3

=== Semifinal round ===
==== 13th–15th place ====
Date	Time		Score		Set 1	Set 2	Set 3	Set 4	Set 5	Total	Report
13 July	15:00	United States	3–0	Norway	25–18	25–15	25–16			75–49	P2 P3

==== 9th–12th place ====
Date	Time		Score		Set 1	Set 2	Set 3	Set 4	Set 5	Total	Report
13 July	18:00	Czech Republic	3–0	Chile	25–21	25–14	25–12			75–47	P2 P3
13 July	20:00	Slovakia	3–0	Hong Kong	25–22	25–11	25–11			75–44	P2 P3

==== 5th–8th place ====
Date	Time		Score		Set 1	Set 2	Set 3	Set 4	Set 5	Total	Report
13 July	13:00	North Korea	0–3	Japan	8–25	7–25	15–25			30–75	P2 P3
13 July	15:00	Chinese Taipei	1–3	Canada	25–27	25–14	20–25	25–27		95–93	P2 P3

=== Final round ===
==== 13th-place game ====
Date	Time		Score		Set 1	Set 2	Set 3	Set 4	Set 5	Total	Report
14 July	15:00	China	3–1	United States	25–20	25–19	22–25	25–17		97–81	P2 P3

==== 11th-place game ====
Date	Time		Score		Set 1	Set 2	Set 3	Set 4	Set 5	Total	Report
14 July	18:00	Chile	3–2	Hong Kong	25–23	22–25	19–25	25–19	15–7	106–99	P2 P3

==== 9th-place game ====
Date	Time		Score		Set 1	Set 2	Set 3	Set 4	Set 5	Total	Report
14 July	20:00	Czech Republic	0–3	Slovakia	23–25	20–25	16–25			59–75	P2 P3

==== 7th-place game ====
Date	Time		Score		Set 1	Set 2	Set 3	Set 4	Set 5	Total	Report
14 July	13:00	Chinese Taipei	1–3	North Korea	25–23	21–25	12–25	24–26		82–99	P2 P3

==== 5th-place game ====
Date	Time		Score		Set 1	Set 2	Set 3	Set 4	Set 5	Total	Report
14 July	15:00	Canada	0–3	Japan	23–25	21–25	20–25			64–75	P2 P3

== Elimination round ==
Quarterfinals
A1	Russia	3
C2	Chinese Taipei	0
D1	Thailand	3
B2	Canada	0
C1	North Korea	1
A2	Poland	3
B1	Brazil	3
D2	Japan	1

Semifinals
A1	Russia	3
D1	Thailand	0
A2	Poland	1
B1	Brazil	3

Gold-medal match
A1	Russia	3
B1	Brazil	2
Bronze-medal match
D1	Thailand	3
A2	Poland	1

=== Quarterfinals ===
Date	Time		Score		Set 1	Set 2	Set 3	Set 4	Set 5	Total	Report
12 July	13:00	Thailand	3–0	Canada	25–17	25–16	26–24			76–57	P2 P3
12 July	15:00	Brazil	3–1	Japan	25–21	25–16	18–25	28–26		96–88	P2 P3
12 July	18:00	North Korea	1–3	Poland	25–14	21–25	21–25	18–25		85–89	P2 P3
12 July	20:00	Russia	3–0	Chinese Taipei	25–21	25–17	25–22			75–60	P2 P3

=== Semifinals ===
Date	Time		Score		Set 1	Set 2	Set 3	Set 4	Set 5	Total	Report
13 July	15:00	Poland	1–3	Brazil	25–20	30–32	19–25	13–25		87–102	P2 P3
13 July	18:00	Russia	3–0	Thailand	25–18	25–19	25–18			75–55	P2 P3

=== Bronze-medal match ===
Date	Time		Score		Set 1	Set 2	Set 3	Set 4	Set 5	Total	Report
15 July	17:00	Thailand	3–1	Poland	25–19	25–18	19–25	25–20		94–82	P2 P3

=== Gold-medal match ===
Date	Time		Score		Set 1	Set 2	Set 3	Set 4	Set 5	Total	Report
15 July	20:00	Russia	3–2	Brazil	25–27	25–21	25–21	16–25	15–10	106–104	P2 P3

== Final standings ==
Place	Team	Score
1st place, gold medalist(s)	Russia	6–0
2nd place, silver medalist(s)	Brazil	4–1
3rd place, bronze medalist(s)	Thailand	5–1
4	Poland	3–3
5	Japan	4–2
6	Canada	2–3
7	North Korea	4–2
8	Chinese Taipei	2–4
9	Slovakia	4–2
10	Czech Republic	3–3
11	Chile	2–3
12	Hong Kong	1–5
13	China	1–4
14	United States	1–5
15	Norway	0–4

== Individuals Awards ==
- Most valuable player
  - Nataliya Obmochaeva (RUS)
- Best setter
  - Juliana Carrijo (BRA)
- Best scorer
  - Jong Jin Sim (PRK)
- Best spiker
  - Nataliya Obmochaeva (RUS)
- Best server
  - Jong Jin Sim (PRK)
- Best blocker
  - Natasha Farinea (BRA)
- Best receiver
  - Tapaphaipun Chaisri (THA)
- Best digger
  - Piyanut Pannoy (THA)
