= Courtney Thompson =

American volleyball player (born 1984)

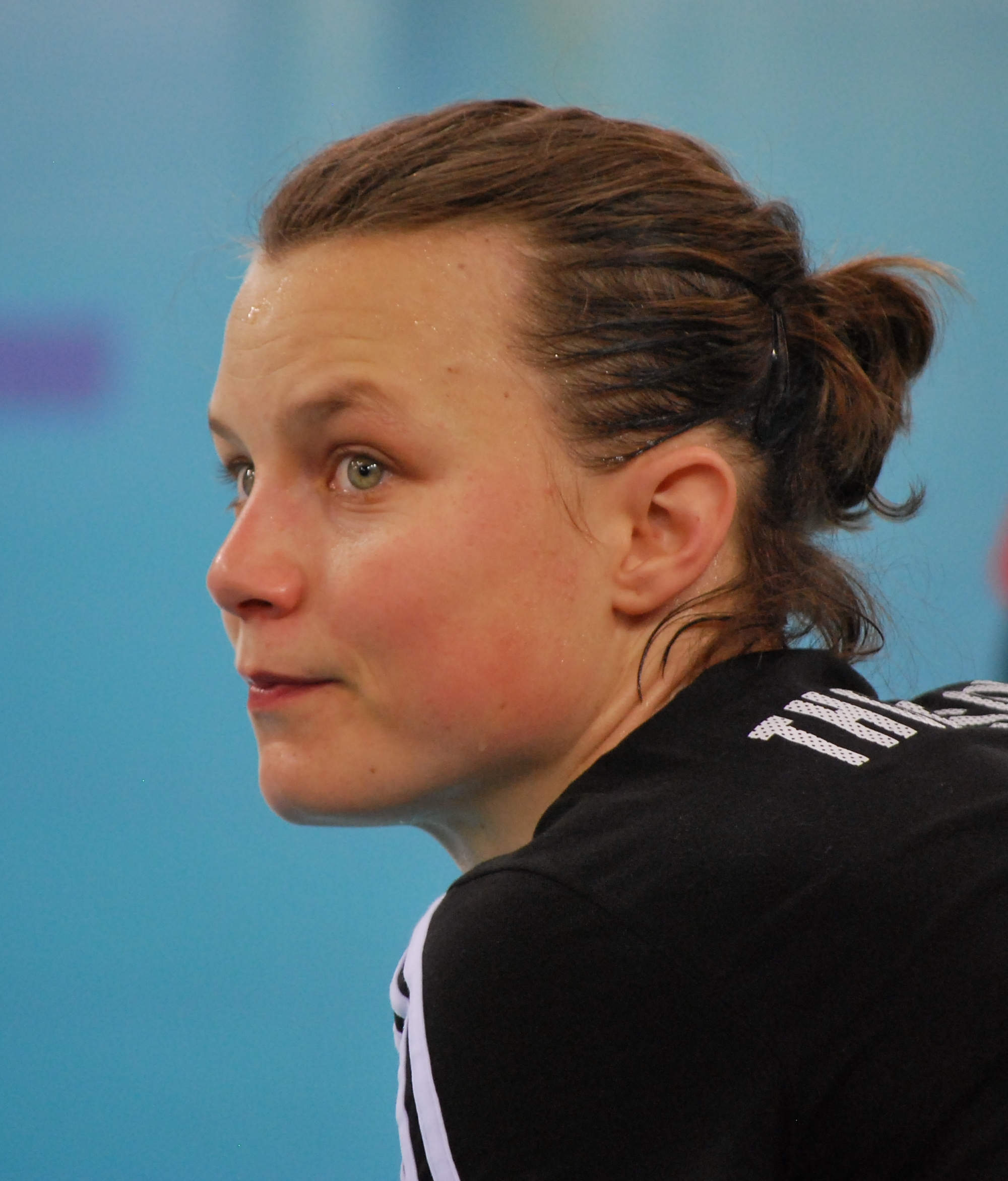

Personal information
- Full name: Courtney Lynn Thompson
- Born: November 4, 1984 (age 41); Bellevue, Washington, U.S.
- Hometown: Kent, Washington, U.S.
- Height: 5 ft 7 in (1.70 m)
- Weight: 146 lb (66 kg)
- Spike: 109 in (276 cm)
- Block: 104 in (263 cm)
- Education: University of Washington

Volleyball information
- Position: Setter
- Number: 17 (2012), 3 (2016)

National team
2007–2016	United States
Medal record
Women's volleyball
Representing the United States
Olympic Games
Silver medal – second place	2012 London	Team
Bronze medal – third place	2016 Rio de Janeiro	Team
World Championship
Gold medal – first place	2014 Italy	Team
FIVB Volleyball World Grand Prix
Gold medal – first place	2012 Ningbo	Team
Gold medal – first place	2015 Omaha	Team
Silver medal – second place	2016 Bangkok	Team
Pan American Games
Bronze medal – third place	2007 Rio de Janeiro	Team
Bronze medal – third place	2011 Guadalajara	Team

Courtney Lynn Thompson (born November 4, 1984) is an American former professional volleyball player who played as a setter for the United States women's national volleyball team. She won the 2005 national championship while playing for the University of Washington, and she set an NCAA record in career assists per game. Thompson won gold with the national team at the 2014 World Championship, silver at the 2012 London Summer Olympics, and bronze at the 2016 Rio Olympic Games.

== Career ==
=== High school ===
Thompson attended Kentlake High School, where she played on the volleyball team and won three state titles. She was named the Washington State Player of the Year in 2002.

=== College ===
Thompson played for the University of Washington volleyball team from 2003 to 2006. As a freshman, she started all 32 of the team's matches and set a school single-season record with 1,590 assists. She also led the Pac-10 in assists per game and was named to the Pac-10 All-Freshman team.

The following year, Thompson broke the school record again with 1,643 assists, leading the conference in assists per game for the second straight time. She made the AVCA All-American first team and the Pac-10 All-Conference first team.

In 2005, Thompson averaged 14.89 assists per game to lead the nation in that category. She also set a University of Washington school record with 4,841 career assists. The Huskies won the NCAA Division I national championship. For the second straight year, Thompson was named to the AVCA All-American first team and the All-Pac-10 first team. She also made the NCAA Championship All-Tournament team, won the Honda Sports Award, and was nominated for an ESPY as the Top Female College Athlete.

In 2006, her senior year, Thompson again led the nation in assists per game, with 14.50. She ended her college career with 6,531 career assists, which was a Pac-10 record. Her career mark of 14.56 assists per game was a new NCAA record. For the third year in a row, she was named to the AVCA All-American first team and the All-Pac-10 first team.

=== International ===
Thompson joined the U.S. national team in January 2007. That year, she played in all five matches of the Pan American Games and helped the U.S. win the bronze medal.

In 2009, Thompson played in 82 sets. She appeared in the Pan American Cup, the FIVB World Grand Prix, and the NORCECA Continental Championship. She averaged 3.72 assists per set.

Thompson received limited playing time with the U.S. from 2010 to 2012. She helped the team win the bronze medal in the 2010 Pan American Cup, the bronze medal in the 2011 Pan American Games, and the gold medal in the 2012 FIVB World Grand Prix.

At the 2012 Summer Olympics, Thompson and the U.S. national team won the silver medal.

Thompson was part of the USA national team that won the 2014 World Championship gold medal when the team defeated China 3-1 in the final match.

Thompson won the bronze medal at the 2015 FIVB Club World Championship, playing with the Swiss club Voléro Zürich.

=== Post-competitive career ===
Extending work that Thompson did following her competitive athletic career, launching Courtney Thompson's Mind.set Training, Thompson joined Finding Mastery and started as an author and performance coach across motivational programs.

Since 2019, Thompson has published multiple thought leadership posts on determination and athletic preparation and coaches professionals as a mindset coach in programs for High Performance Mindset and about "Grit" and "Trust" in courses on Finding Your Best. Courtney worked with Dr. Michael Gervais during her time as a competitive athlete and now works for Finding Mastery, the coaching and training firm co-founded by Dr. Gervais, as a Mindset Coach relating critical experiences from her olympic career to professionals.

=== Coaching ===
On April 19, 2021, Stanford announced it would be adding Thompson onto their coaching staff as an assistant coach on their women's volleyball team. Thompson replaced Alisha Glass Childress.

== Personal life ==
Thompson was born in Bellevue, Washington, and resides in Kent, Washington. She was the valedictorian at Kentlake High School. She has two brothers. Thompson is a member of Athletes for Hope.

In 2013, Courtney Thompson's journey to make the 2012 US Olympic roster was featured in Court & Spark, a one-hour documentary written and directed by Jack Hamann, featuring her experience qualifying for the US olympic team, including the difficulty of balancing personal life with world-class athletic travel.

Since 2017, Thompson has taken up running and joined the Women's field for the Boston Marathon where she placed 30th with a time of 2 hours, 54 minutes and 41 seconds. In 2018, Thompson completed a 35-mile ultra-marathon in Whistler, Canada.

== Awards ==
=== College ===
- 2006 Honda Sports Award for volleyball

=== Clubs ===
- 2015–16 Brazilian Women's Volleyball Superliga – Gold medal, with Rexona Ades Rio
- 2015 FIVB Club World Championship – Bronze medal, with Voléro Zürich

=== National team ===
- 2010 FIVB World Grand Prix
- 2011 Pan-American Volleyball Cup
- 2011 Pan American Games
- 2012 FIVB World Grand Prix
- 2012 Summer Olympics
- 2013 Pan-American Volleyball Cup
- 2014 FIVB World Championship
- 2015 FIVB World Grand Prix
- 2015 FIVB Women's World Cup
- 2015 Women's NORCECA Volleyball Continental Championship
- 2016 Women's NORCECA Olympic Qualification Tournament
- 2016 FIVB World Grand Prix
- 2016 Summer Olympics
