= 栗林 =

栗林, meaning "chestnut, forest", may refer to:

- Kuribayashi, Japanese surname
- Lilin (disambiguation), Chinese transliterated place names
- Ritsurin (disambiguation), Japanese place name

== See also ==
- The dictionary definition of 栗 at Wiktionary
- The dictionary definition of 林 at Wiktionary
