= Li Lin =

Li Lin or Lin Li may refer to:

== People surnamed Li ==
- Li Lin (prince) (李璘, died 757), prince of the Tang dynasty
- Li Lin (Tang chancellor) (李麟, 694–759), chancellor of the Tang dynasty
- Li Lin (physicist) (李林; 1923–2003), Chinese physicist
- Li Lin (biochemist) (李林; born 1961), Chinese biochemist
- Lin Li (engineer) (李林), Chinese-British laser engineer

== People surnamed Lin ==
- Lin Li (swimmer) (林莉, born 1970), Chinese swimmer
- Carrie Lam (actress) or Lin Li (林莉, born 1980), Hong Kong actress
- Lin Li (gymnast) (林丽, born 1986), Chinese gymnast
- Lin Li (volleyball) (林莉, born 1992), Chinese volleyball player

== See also ==
- Lilin (disambiguation)
- Linli (disambiguation)
