= Foluke Gunderson =

Indoor volleyball player (born 1987)

Foluke Akinradewo Gunderson
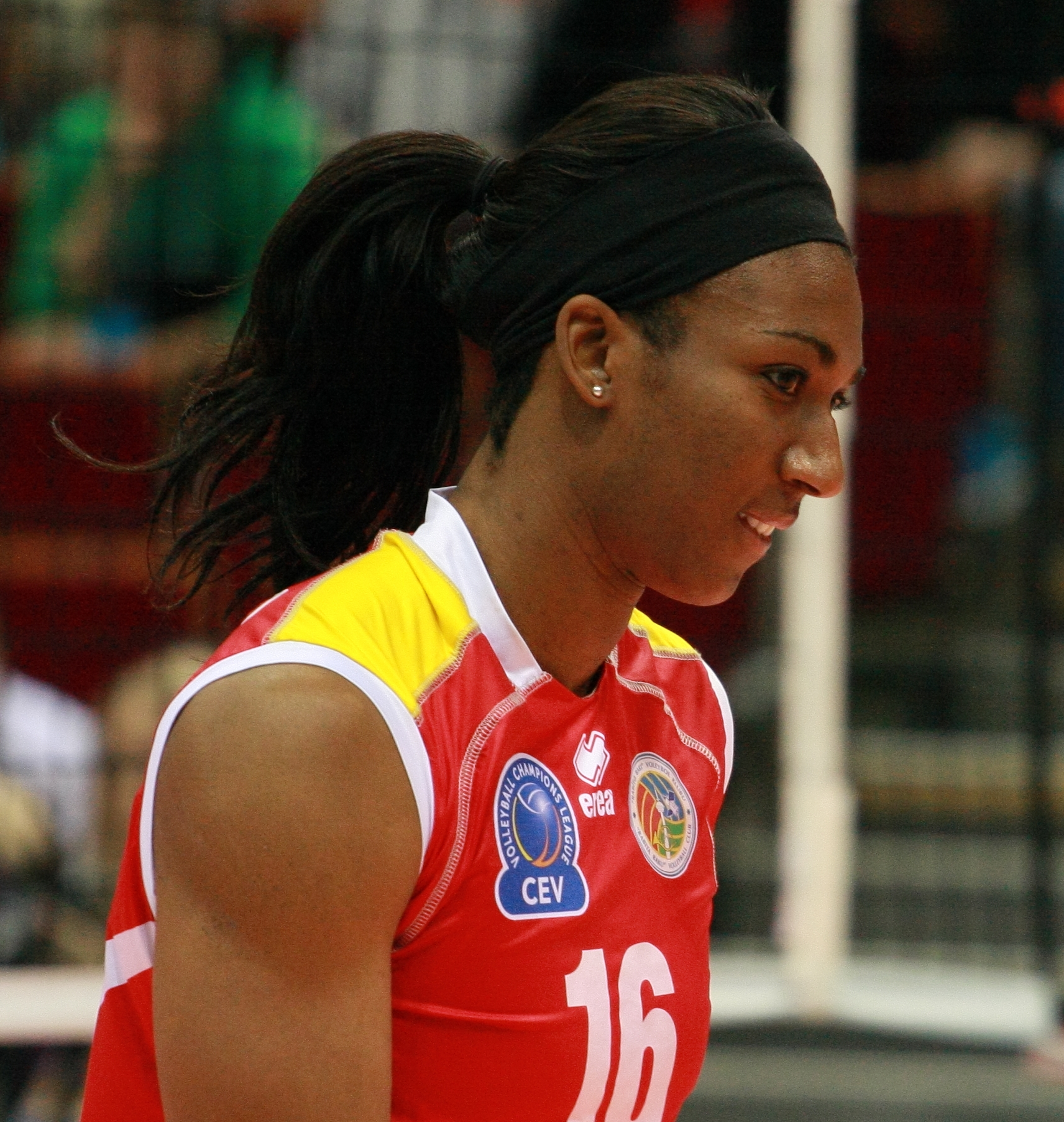
- Gunderson in 2012 with Rabita Baku

Personal information
- Full name: Foluke Atinuke Gunderson
- Nationality: Canadian/American/Nigerian
- Born: Foluke Atinuke Akinradewo; October 5, 1987 (age 39); London, Ontario, Canada
- Hometown: Fort Lauderdale, Florida, U.S.
- Height: 6 ft 3 in (191 cm)
- Spike: 130 in (330 cm)
- Block: 118 in (300 cm)
- Education: Stanford University

Volleyball information
- Position: Middle blocker
- Number: 16

Career
Years	Teams
2010–2011; 2011–2012; 2012–2015; 2015–2017; 2017–2019	(Japan) TAB Queenseis (Russia) Dinamo Krasnodar (Azerbaijan) Rabita Baku (Switzerland) Volero Zurich (Japan) Hisamitsu Springs

National team
2005–2021	United States
Medal record
Women's volleyball
Representing United States
Olympic Games
Gold medal – first place	2020 Tokyo	Team
Silver medal – second place	2012 London	Team
Bronze medal – third place	2016 Rio de Janeiro	Team
World Championship
Gold medal – first place	2014 Italy	Team
World Cup
Silver medal – second place	2011 Japan	Team
Bronze medal – third place	2015 Japan	Team
World Grand Champions Cup
Bronze medal – third place	2017 Japan	Team
World Grand Prix
Gold medal – first place	2010 Ningbo	Team
Gold medal – first place	2011 Macau	Team
Gold medal – first place	2015 Omaha	Team
Silver medal – second place	2016 Bangkok	Team
FIVB Nations League
Gold medal – first place	2018 Nanjing	Team
Gold medal – first place	2021 Rimini	Team
Pan American Games
Bronze medal – third place	2007 Rio de Janeiro	Team
Pan American Cup
Bronze medal – third place	2010 Rosarito & Tijuana	Team
Bronze medal – third place	2011 Ciudad Juárez	Team
NORCECA Championship
Gold medal – first place	2011 Caguas

Foluke Atinuke Gunderson (née Akinradewo; born October 5, 1987) is a former indoor volleyball player who played as a middle blocker for Japanese club Hisamitsu Springs. Born in Canada, she represents the United States internationally. Gunderson won gold with the national team at the 2010 FIVB World Grand Prix, 2014 World Championship, the Rimini Volleyball Nations League, and the 2020 Tokyo Summer Olympics, silver at the 2012 London Summer Olympics, and bronze at the 2016 Rio Olympic Games. Her 2020 Olympics win allowed her to complete the trifecta of winning an Olympic bronze, silver, and gold medal.

== High school and personal life ==
Gunderson was born in London, Ontario, to Ayoola and Comfort Akinradewo. Her siblings are Folu and Foluso Akinradewo. She holds a tri-citizenship with Canada, Nigeria, and the United States, and used to audition for commercials when she was little.

Gunderson attended St. Thomas Aquinas High School in Fort Lauderdale, Florida, where she was a three-year letter winner in volleyball and was also on the basketball and track & field teams. She was an All-American selection in 2003 and 2004 and an all-state selection in 2002, 2003 and 2004. She was named the Florida Dairy Farmers Volleyball Player of the Year in 2005. In addition to volleyball, she was an all-state selection in basketball and was a four-time Florida State Champion in track. She made her US international debut before the start of her freshman year at Stanford. She helped the US win the 2004 NORCECA Continental Women's Junior Championship, and then was the starting middle blocker on the U.S. Women's Junior National Team at the 2005 FIVB World Championships.

== Stanford ==
Gunderson majored in human biology at Stanford University.

As a freshman in 2005, she was named the Pac-10 Freshman of the Year and the American Volleyball Coaches Association (AVCA) Pacific Region Freshman of the Year. She was named an AVCA Second Team All-American and led the squad in hitting percentage (.397), a mark which ranked third in the Pac-10, 13th in the nation and third for a single-season in school history. In 2006, she was named to the NCAA Final Four All-Tournament Team as she led Stanford to an NCAA Division I runner-up finish to Nebraska. For the year, she was named a First Team All-American by the AVCA.

In 2007, Gunderson was named the AVCA National Player of the Year and was the Honda Sports Award winner for volleyball. She broke the Pac-10 and Stanford single season hitting percentage record by more than 50 points, as she averaged .499 percentage, a mark that was first in the nation and second since rally-scoring was introduced in 2001. She was named to the Final Four All-Tournament Team as she led Stanford to their second consecutive Division I national runner-up finish to Penn State. As a senior in 2008, Gunderson repeated as the Pac-10 Player of the Year and got her third consecutive Honda Award nomination. She repeated as a First Team All-American and led Stanford to their third consecutive NCAA title match. She finished her collegiate career with the best career hitting efficiency (.446) of any NCAA Division I player.

== Club volleyball ==
Gunderson joined Toyota Auto Body Queenseis in October 2010. In the 2010–11 V.Premier League, Gunderson was named the winner of the Spike award. Gunderson won the silver medal in the 2012 FIVB Club World Championship, playing with the Azerbaijani club Rabita Baku.

In 2013 Gunderson's club, Rabita Baku, won the Azerbaijan Super League Championship winning their sixth title in a row. She won the league's Best Spiker award.

== International career ==
=== 2012 ===
Gunderson competed for Team USA in the 2012 Summer Olympics. She earned a silver medal for her efforts.

=== 2014 ===
Gunderson was part of the USA national team that won the 2014 World Championship gold medal when the team defeated China 3–1 in the final match. It was the USA's first-ever gold in any of the three major volleyball tournaments.

=== 2016 ===
Gunderson was part of the US bronze medal-winning team at the 2016 Olympics. She started all eight games. She was named in the 2016 Olympic Games Dream Team at middle blocker.

=== 2021 ===
In May 2021, she was named to the 18-player roster for the FIVB Volleyball Nations League tournament. that will be played May 25-June 24 in Rimini, Italy. It is the only major international competition before the Tokyo Olympics in July.

On June 7, 2021, US National Team head coach Karch Kiraly announced she would be part of the 12-player Olympic roster for the 2020 Summer Olympics in Tokyo.

== Awards ==
=== Individual ===
- 2010 FIVB World Grand Prix "Most Valuable Player"
- 2010 FIVB World Grand Prix "Best Blocker"
- 2010–2011 Japanese V.League "Spike Award"
- 2012-13 Azerbaijan Super League "Best Spiker"
- 2016 Olympic Games "Best Middle Blocker"
- 2016 FIVB Club World Championship "Best Middle Blocker"
- 2017-2018 Japanese V.League Division 1 "Spike Award"
- 2018-2019 Japanese V.League "Best Middle Blocker"
- 2018-2019 Japanese V.League "Most Valuable Player"

=== College ===
- Four-time AVCA All-American (2005, second team; 2006–08, first team)
- Three-time Volleyball Magazine first team All-American (2006–08)
- Four-time All-Pac-10 team (2005–08)
- Two-time NCAA Final Four All-Tournament Team (2006, 2007)
- 2008 – Volleyball Magazine National co-Player of the Year
- 2008 – Honda Award nominee
- 2008 – Pac-10 Player of the Year
- 2007 – AVCA National Player of the Year
- 2007 – Pac-10 Player of the Year
- 2007 – Honda Award winner for volleyball
- 2007 – NCAA Stanford Regional MVP
- 2007 – Pac-10 Player of the Week (Oct. 1)
- 2006 – Honda Award nominee
- 2005 – AVCA Pacific Region Freshman of the Year
- 2005 – Pac-10 Freshman of the Year

=== National team ===
- 2010 Pan-American Volleyball Cup
- 2010 FIVB World Grand Prix
- 2011 Pan-American Volleyball Cup
- 2011 Women's NORCECA Volleyball Continental Championship
- 2011 FIVB World Grand Prix
- 2011 FIVB Women's World Cup
- 2012 FIVB World Grand Prix
- 2012 Summer Olympics
- 2013 FIVB World Grand Champions Cup
- 2013 Women's NORCECA Volleyball Continental Championship
- 2014 FIVB World Championship
- 2015 FIVB World Grand Prix
- 2015 FIVB Women's World Cup
- 2015 Women's NORCECA Volleyball Continental Championship
- 2016 Women's NORCECA Olympic Qualification Tournament
- 2016 FIVB World Grand Prix
- 2016 Summer Olympics
- 2017 FIVB World Grand Champions Cup
- 2018 FIVB Volleyball Women's Nations League
- 2019 FIVB Volleyball Women's Nations League
- 2019 FIVB Women's Volleyball Intercontinental Olympic Qualifications Tournament (IOQT) - Qualified
- 2019 FIVB Women's World Cup
- 2019 Women's NORCECA Volleyball Continental Championship
- 2021 FIVB Volleyball Women's Nations League
- 2020 2020 Summer Olympics

== Clubs ==
- (Japan) Toyota Auto Body Queenseis (2010–2011)
- (Russia) Dinamo Krasnodar (2011–2012)
- (Azerbaijan) Rabita Baku (2012–2015)
- (Switzerland) Voléro Zürich (2015–2017)
- (Japan) Hisamitsu Springs (2017–2019)
- (Japan) Hisamitsu Springs (2020–2021)

== Sources ==
- Akinradewo Player Bio at gostanford.com
- Akinradewo on usavolleyball.org

Awards
Preceded by (Brazil) Sheilla Castro	Most Valuable Player of FIVB World Grand Prix; 2010	Succeeded by (United States) Destinee Hooker
Preceded by (Brazil) Fabiana Claudino	Best Blocker of FIVB World Grand Prix; 2010	Succeeded by (Russia) Iuliia Morozova
Preceded by First Award	Best Middle Blocker of Olympic Games; 2016 (with (Serbia) Milena Rašić)	Succeeded by (United States) Haleigh Washington and (Brazil) Carol Gattaz
Preceded by (Croatia) Maja Poljak and (Brazil) Ana Carolina da Silva	Best Middle Blocker of FIVB Club World Championship; 2016 (with (Serbia) Milena Rašić)	Succeeded by (Croatia) Maja Poljak and (Turkey) Kubra Akman
