= Kayla Banwarth =

American volleyball player and coach

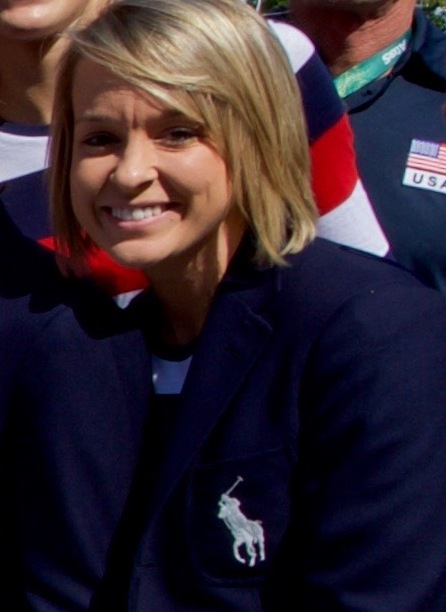
- Banwarth in 2016

Biographical details
- Born: January 21, 1989 (age 37); Dubuque, Iowa, U.S.
- Height: 5 ft 10 in (178 cm)
- Weight: 165 lb (75 kg)

Playing career
- 2007–2010: Nebraska
- 2011–2016: Team USA
- Position: Libero

Coaching career (HC unless noted)
- 2015–2016: Pepperdine (volunteer asst.)
- 2017–2019: Nebraska (asst.)
- 2020–2022: Ole Miss

Head coaching record
- Overall: 29-38
Medal record
Volleyball
Olympic Games
| Bronze medal – third place | 2016 Rio de Janeiro | Team |
World Championship
| Gold medal – first place | 2014 Italy | Team |
World Cup
| Bronze medal – third place | 2015 Japan | Team |
FIVB World Grand Prix
| Gold medal – first place | 2015 Omaha | Team |
| Silver medal – second place | 2016 Bangkok | Team |
Pan American Games
| Bronze medal – third place | 2011 Guadalajara | Team |

Kayla Banwarth (born January 21, 1989) is an American former volleyball player and coach. She played as a libero for the United States women's national volleyball team. Banwarth won gold with the national team at the 2014 World Championship, and bronze at the 2015 World Cup and 2016 Rio Olympic Games.

== Early life ==
Banwarth was born in Dubuque, Iowa and attended high school at Wahlert Catholic High School. Her team won three state titles and Banwarth graduated with 1,155 kills, 1,093 digs, and 364 aces. She also set school records for digs and aces. Banwarth was named the Iowa Gatorade Player of the Year in 2006.

== Career ==
She played college volleyball at the University of Nebraska–Lincoln.

Banwarth was part of the USA national team that won the 2014 World Championship gold medal when the team defeated China 3–1 in the final match.
Banwarth retired after the 2016 Rio Olympics and took on a coaching role at her former college, Nebraska, helping the women's volleyball team. She then went on to become the head coach for the Ole Miss starting in the fall of 2020. After a 1-19 COVID-19 shortened first year, in her second season she led the team to their first NCAA tournament appearance in 11 years and their first 20-win (21-9) season in 8 years. In the middle of the 2022 season, Banwarth was placed on leave and eventually she and the university mutually agreed to part ways.

== Awards ==
=== Individual ===
- 2015 NORCECA Championship "Best Receiver"

=== National team ===
- 2011 Pan-American Volleyball Cup
- 2012 Pan-American Volleyball Cup
- 2013 Pan-American Volleyball Cup
- 2013 NORCECA Championship
- 2013 FIVB World Grand Champions Cup
- 2014 FIVB World Championship
- 2015 FIVB World Grand Prix
- 2015 FIVB Women's World Cup
- 2015 Women's NORCECA Volleyball Continental Championship
- 2016 Women's NORCECA Olympic Qualification Tournament
- 2016 FIVB World Grand Prix
- 2016 Summer Olympics

== Head coaching record ==
Record table
| Season | Team | Overall | Conference | Standing | Postseason |
|---|---|---|---|---|---|
Ole Miss Rebels (Southeastern Conference) (2020–2022)
| 2020–21 | Ole Miss | 1–19 | 1–19 | 13th | |
| 2021 | Ole Miss | 21–9 | 10–8 | T–5th | NCAA First Round |
| 2022 | Ole Miss | 7–10* | 3–4 | | |
| Ole Miss: | | 29–38 (.433) | 14–31 (.311) | *Suspended October 20, 2022 and mutually parted ways on October 27, 2022. | |
| Total: | | 29–38 (.433) | | | |
