= Alisha Glass =

American volleyball player (born 1988)

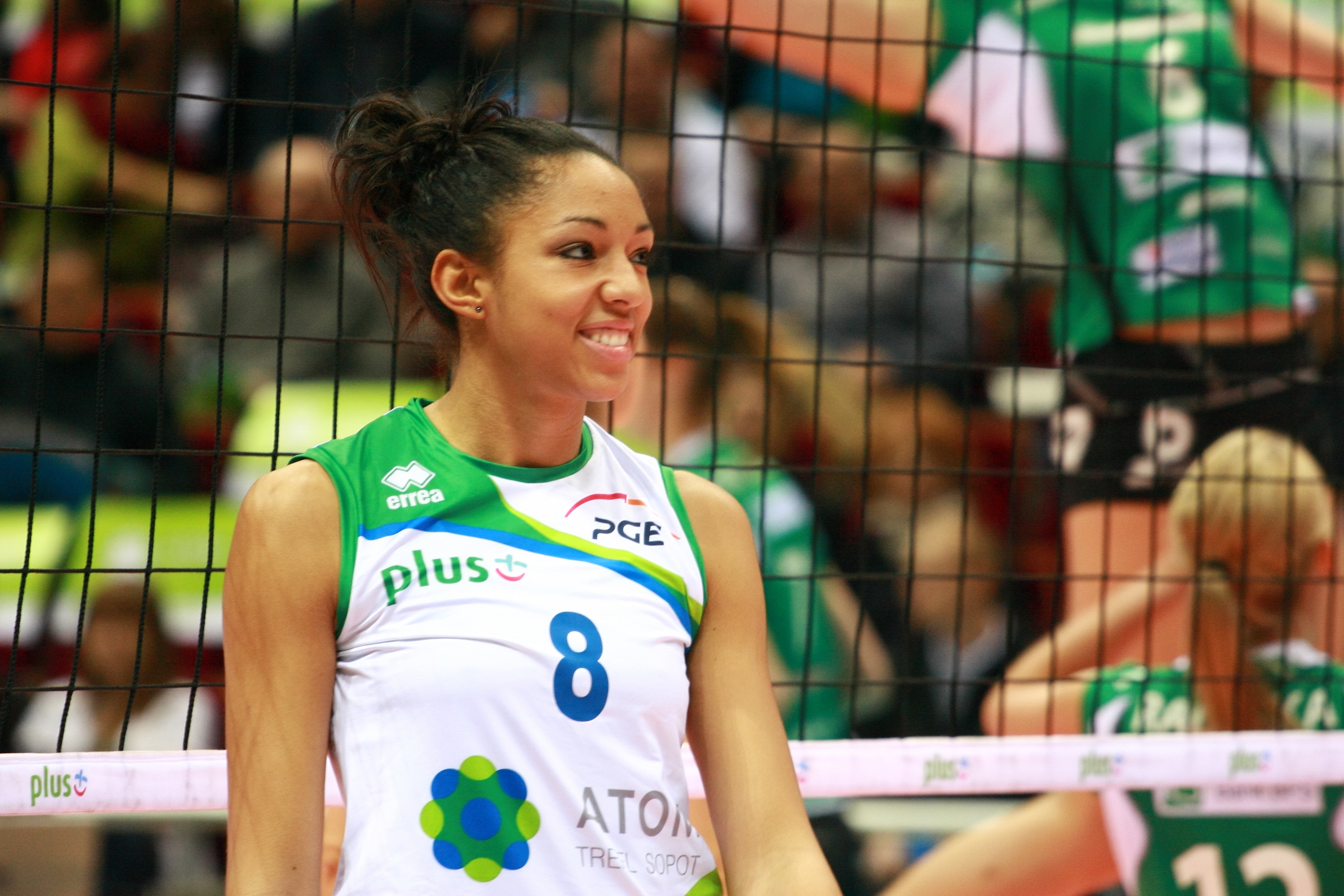

Personal information
- Full name: Alisha Rebecca Glass
- Nationality: United States
- Born: April 5, 1988 (age 38); Leland, Michigan, U.S.
- Hometown: Leland, Michigan, U.S.
- Height: 6 ft 0 in (1.84 m)
- Weight: 159 lb (72 kg)
- Spike: 120 in (305 cm)
- Block: 118 in (300 cm)
- Education: Penn State University

Volleyball information
- Position: Setter
- Current club: (United States) Vegas Thrill
- Number: 6

Career
Years	Teams
2010–2011	(Brazil) Vôlei Futuro
2011–2012	(Poland) Atom Trefl Sopot
2012–2013	(Italy) LIU•JO Volley Modena
2013–2014	(Turkey) Fenerbahçe
2014–2016	(Italy) Imoco Volley Conegliano
2024–	(United States) Vegas Thrill

National team
2009–2016	United States
Medal record
Olympic Games
Bronze medal – third place	2016 Rio de Janeiro	Team
World Championship
Gold medal – first place	2014 Italy	Team
World Cup
Silver medal – second place	2011 Japan	Team
Bronze medal – third place	2015 Japan	Team
World Grand Prix
Gold medal – first place	2010 Ningbo	Team
Gold medal – first place	2011 Macau	Team
Gold medal – first place	2012 Ningbo	Team
Silver medal – second place	2016 Bangkok	Team

Alisha Rebecca Glass Childress (born April 5, 1988) is an American professional volleyball player who played as a setter for the Vegas Thrill of the Pro Volleyball Federation. Glass played collegiate volleyball for Penn State, where she led Penn State to three NCAA consecutive championships. Glass Childress won gold with the national team at the 2014 World Championship, and bronze at the 2015 World Cup and 2016 Rio Olympic Games. As of 2025, she serves as the head coach of the San Diego Mojo. Glass Childress has 3 children with husband and former NBA professional, Joshua Childress.

== Career ==
=== High school ===
Glass played high school volleyball for Leland High School in Michigan, where her mother Laurie Glass was also her coach and grandfather Larry Glass was her high school basketball coach. She was a four-time first team all-state, all-region dream team and all-conference, is the National and State High School record holder in season aces (296), career aces (937) and career kills (3,584) and during scholastic career attacked at a .440 clip while also contributing 1,816 digs and 680 blocks. She was named "Michigan Gatorade High School Player" Year and Miss Volleyball for the state of Michigan.

=== College ===
She played college women's volleyball at Penn State University. During her four years at Penn State, the Nittany Lions posted a stunning 142–5 record (.966), including a perfect 102-0 streak that spanned three seasons, captured the 2007, 2008 and 2009 NCAA titles, advanced to the 2006 Elite Eight and won four Big Ten Conference titles. She was the three-time All-American, first team All-Big Ten, and three-time First Team AVCA All-Mideast Region. Under her guidance, Glass directed the Penn State offense to a record setting and nation-leading .390 hitting percentage and the Nittany Lions bested their own record of .350 set in 2007. She finished her career in 13th place in hitting percentage with .336 and blocks with 448, fourth in assists with 5,800, and fifteen with 465 sets played.

=== International ===
Glass won the gold medal at the 2014 World Championship when her national team defeated 3–1 to China. She was also selected tournament's Best Setter. Glass has played for the United States women's national volleyball team in Rio that won a bronze medal and was named Best Setter.

== Clubs ==
- (United States) Penn State University (2006–2009)
- (Brazil) Vôlei Futuro (2010–2011)
- (Poland) Atom Trefl Sopot (2011–2012)
- (Italy) LIU•JO Volley Modena (2012–2013)
- (Turkey) Fenerbahçe (2013–2014)
- (Italy) Imoco Volley Conegliano (2014–2016)
- (United States) Athletes Unlimited (2022)

== Coaching ==
Glass Childress joined the Stanford women's volleyball coaching staff as an assistant coach in January 2019. She left after 2 seasons.

Glass Childress is currently the head coach of the San Diego Mojo, leading the team to the 2026 semifinals.

== Awards ==
=== Individual ===
- 2013 World Grand Prix "Best Setter"
- 2013 NORCECA Championship "Best Setter"
- 2014 FIVB World Championship "Best Setter"
- 2016 Olympic Games "Best Setter"

=== National team ===
- 2011 Pan-American Volleyball Cup
- 2011 Women's NORCECA Volleyball Continental Championship
- 2011 FIVB World Grand Prix
- 2011 FIVB Women's World Cup
- 2012 Pan-American Volleyball Cup
- 2012 FIVB World Grand Prix
- 2013 Pan-American Volleyball Cup
- 2013 NORCECA Championship
- 2013 FIVB World Grand Champions Cup
- 2014 FIVB World Championship
- 2015 FIVB World Grand Prix
- 2015 FIVB Women's World Cup
- 2015 Women's NORCECA Volleyball Continental Championship
- 2016 Women's NORCECA Olympic Qualification Tournament
- 2016 FIVB World Grand Prix
- 2016 Summer Olympics

=== College ===
- 2x First Team AVCA All-American (2008, 2009)
- Second Team AVCA All-American (2007)
- 3x NCAA Championship All-Tournament Team (2007, 2008, 2009)
- 2x NCAA Regional All-Tournament Team ( 2008, 2009)
- 3x AVCA National Player of the Week (11/11/06, 11/19/07, 11/18/08)
- Three-time First Team All-Big Ten (2007, 2008, 2009)
- 2006 Big Ten All-Freshman Team
- Four-time Big Ten Player of the Week

== See also ==
- List of Pennsylvania State University Olympians

Awards
Preceded by (Japan) Yoshie Takeshita (Thailand) Nootsara Tomkom	Best Setter of FIVB World Grand Prix; 2010; 2013	Succeeded by (Brazil) Dani Lins (Brazil) Dani Lins
Preceded by (Russia) Yevgeniya Startseva	Best Setter of Olympic Games; 2016	Succeeded by (United States) Jordyn Poulter
