= Lilin (disambiguation) =

Lilin are hostile night spirits that attack men in Mesopotamian and Jewish demonology.

Lilin may also refer to:

== Geography ==
China

- Lilin, Guangdong (沥林), a town in Huicheng District, Huizhou, Guangdong, China
- Lilin, Henan (梨林), a town in Jiyuan, Henan, China
- Lilin, Jiangxi (礼林), a town in Leping, Jiangxi, China
- Lilin Township (栗林乡), a township in Anhua County, Hunan, China

Taiwan

- Lilin railway station (栗林車站), a railway station
- Lilin, Taichung (栗林里), an urban village in Tanzi District, Taichung, Taiwan

== Names ==
- Lilin Baba (born 1992), a Nigerian singer
- Wong Lilin (born 1972), a Singaporean media personality and businesswoman
- Nicolai Lilin, Italian‑Moldovan writer and tattoo artist

== See also ==
- "Lilin-Lilin Kecil", an Indonesian pop song
- Li Lin (disambiguation)
- Kuribayashi, written as “栗林”
- Ritsurin (disambiguation), written as “栗林”
