= Volleyball at the 2016 Summer Olympics – Women's European qualification =

2016 European Olympic Qualification Tournament
Tournament details
- Host country: Turkey
- Dates: 4–9 January
- Teams: 8
- Venue: 1 (in 1 host city)

Final positions
- Champions: Russia (4th title)

Tournament awards
- MVP: (Russia) Nataliya Obmochaeva

The European qualification for the 2016 Women's Olympic Volleyball Tournament was held from 4 to 9 January 2016 in Ankara, Turkey. Russia won the tournament by beating Netherlands 3–1, and qualified for the Olympic games. Nataliya Obmochaeva was selected the most valuable player.

== Qualification ==
The host country played with the 7 highest CEV ranking teams which had not yet qualified to the Olympic games. Numbers in brackets denoted the European ranking as of 5 October 2015 except the host which ranked 4th.

- Turkey (host)
- Russia (1)
- Italy (2)
- Germany (5)
- Netherlands (6)
- Belgium (7)
- Poland (8)
- Croatia (9)

== Pools composition ==
The pools composition was announced on 23 October 2015 at the headquarters of CEV, Luxembourg. It followed the Serpentine system according to their European ranking as of 5 October 2015. CEV reserved the right to seed the hosts as head of Pool A regardless of the European ranking.

Pool A	Pool B
Turkey	Russia
Germany	Italy
Netherlands	Belgium
Croatia	Poland

== Venue ==
Ankara, Turkey
Başkent Volleyball Hall
Capacity: 7,600
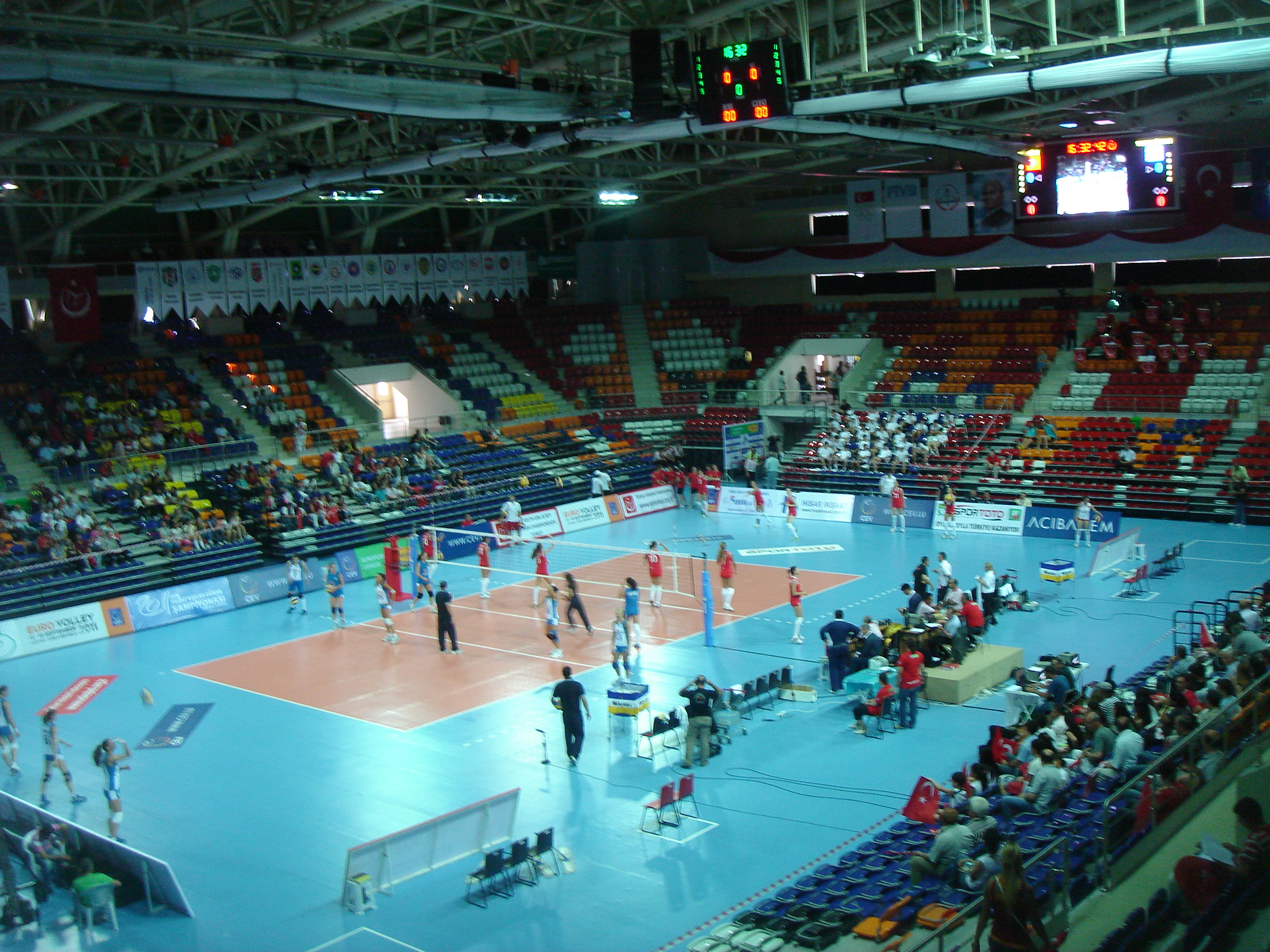

== Pool standing procedure ==
1. Number of matches won
2. Match points
3. Sets ratio
4. Points ratio
5. Result of the last match between the tied teams

Match won 3–0 or 3–1: 3 match points for the winner, 0 match points for the loser
Match won 3–2: 2 match points for the winner, 1 match point for the loser

== Preliminary round ==
- All times are Eastern European Time (UTC+02:00).

=== Pool A ===
Pos	Team	Pld	W	L	Pts	SW	SL	SR	SPW	SPL	SPR	Qualification
1	Netherlands	3	2	1	7	8	3	2.667	258	215	1.200	Semifinals
2	Turkey	3	2	1	6	6	4	1.500	220	215	1.023	Semifinals
3	Germany	3	2	1	5	7	5	1.400	269	255	1.055	
4	Croatia	3	0	3	0	0	9	0.000	163	225	0.724	

Date	Time		Score		Set 1	Set 2	Set 3	Set 4	Set 5	Total	Report
4 Jan	14:00	Netherlands	2–3	Germany	28–26	22–25	22–25	25–20	11–15	108–111	Report
4 Jan	19:30	Croatia	0–3	Turkey	18–25	22–25	17–25			57–75	Report
5 Jan	19:30	Germany	1–3	Turkey	25–27	25–23	16–25	17–25		83–100	Report
6 Jan	16:30	Germany	3–0	Croatia	25–16	25–14	25–17			75–47	Report
6 Jan	19:30	Turkey	0–3	Netherlands	14–25	10–25	21–25			45–75	Report
7 Jan	16:30	Netherlands	3–0	Croatia	25–19	25–17	25–23			75–59	Report

=== Pool B ===
Pos	Team	Pld	W	L	Pts	SW	SL	SR	SPW	SPL	SPR	Qualification
1	Russia	3	3	0	8	9	3	3.000	275	235	1.170	Semifinals
2	Italy	3	2	1	4	7	7	1.000	292	306	0.954	Semifinals
3	Belgium	3	1	2	4	5	7	0.714	256	267	0.959	
4	Poland	3	0	3	2	5	9	0.556	286	301	0.950	

Date	Time		Score		Set 1	Set 2	Set 3	Set 4	Set 5	Total	Report
4 Jan	16:30	Poland	2–3	Russia	25–19	25–18	22–25	14–25	10–15	96–102	Report
5 Jan	14:00	Italy	1–3	Russia	16–25	25–23	19–25	21–25		81–98	Report
5 Jan	16:30	Belgium	3–1	Poland	25–19	16–25	27–25	25–18		93–87	Report
6 Jan	14:00	Belgium	2–3	Italy	25–16	23–25	25–22	17–25	15–17	105–105	Report
7 Jan	14:00	Russia	3–0	Belgium	25–19	25–22	25–17			75–58	Report
7 Jan	19:30	Italy	3–2	Poland	25–18	25–22	22–25	19–25	15–13	106–103	Report

== Final round ==
Semifinals
8 January
Russia	3
Turkey	1
8 January
Netherlands	3
Italy	0

Final
9 January
Russia	3
Netherlands	1
Third place
9 January
Turkey	2
Italy	3

=== Semifinals ===
Date	Time		Score		Set 1	Set 2	Set 3	Set 4	Set 5	Total	Report
8 Jan	16:30	Netherlands	3–0	Italy	25–23	25–21	25–19			75–63	Report
8 Jan	19:30	Russia	3–1	Turkey	21–25	25–18	25–12	25–20		96–75	Report

=== Third place ===
Date	Time		Score		Set 1	Set 2	Set 3	Set 4	Set 5	Total	Report
9 Jan	16:30	Turkey	2–3	Italy	23–25	25–19	23–25	25–15	13–15	109–99	Report

=== Final ===
Date	Time		Score		Set 1	Set 2	Set 3	Set 4	Set 5	Total	Report
9 Jan	19:30	Russia	3–1	Netherlands	25–21	22–25	25–19	25–20		97–85	Report

== Final standing ==
Rank	Team	Qualification
1	Russia	2016 Summer Olympics
2	Netherlands	World Olympic; Qualification Tournament
3	Italy	World Olympic; Qualification Tournament
4	Turkey	
5	Germany	
6	Belgium	
7	Poland	
8	Croatia	

2016 European Olympic Qualifier

Russia

== Dream team ==
- Most valuable player
  (Russia) Nataliya Obmochaeva
- Best setter
  (Russia) Yevgeniya Startseva
- Best outside spiker
  (Italy) Paola Egonu
  (Turkey) Neriman Özsoy
- Best middle blocker
  (Netherlands) Robin de Kruijf
  (Turkey) Kübra Akman
- Best opposite spiker
  (Netherlands) Lonneke Slöetjes
- Best libero
  (Italy) Stefania Sansonna

== See also ==
- Volleyball at the 2016 Summer Olympics – Men's European qualification
