= Yang Fangxu =

Chinese volleyball player (born 1994)

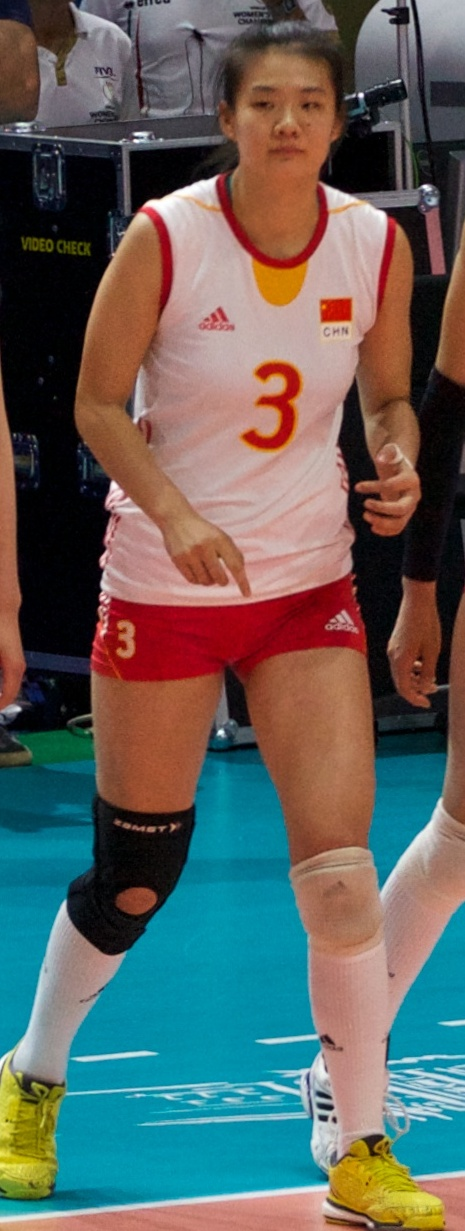
- Yang Fangxu in 2014

Personal information
- Nationality: Chinese
- Born: 6 October 1994 (age 32) Shandong, China
- Home town: Shandong, China
- Height: 1.90 m (6 ft 3 in)
- Weight: 71 kg (157 lb)
- Spike: 308 cm (121 in)
- Block: 300 cm (120 in)

Volleyball information
- Position: Opposite hitter / Outside hitter

National team
- Years: Team
- 2014–2016, 2018-2019: China
Honours
Volleyball
Olympic Games
Gold medal – first place	2016 Rio de Janeiro	Team
World Championship
Silver medal – second place	2014 Italy	Team
Volleyball Nations League
Bronze medal – third place	2018 Nanjing	Team
Asian Championship
Gold medal – first place	2015 Tianjin

Yang Fangxu (simplified Chinese: 杨方旭; traditional Chinese: 楊方旭; pinyin: Yáng Fāngxù; born 6 October 1994) is a retired professional volleyball player. She was a member of the China women's national volleyball team that won gold medal in the 2016 Olympic Games held in Rio de Janeiro, Brazil.

== Career ==
On 11 August 2018, Yang tested positive for doping with erythropoietin (EPO), which stimulates the growth of oxygen-carrying red blood cells in the body. On 13 August 2018, she was banned from playing for four years until 2022 by the China Anti-Doping Agency (CHINADA).

In June 2019, Yang announced her retirement through her social media.

In 2022, Yang became the assistant coach of Shandong Rizhao Steel volleyball team.

== Clubs ==
- (China) Shandong (2011 - 2019)
