= Kurabayashi =

Kurabayashi (jap. 倉林, lit. "storehouse-forest") is a Japanese surname. Notable people with the name include:

- Akiko Kurabayashi (born 1960), Japanese Communist politician
- Akira Kurabayashi (1969/1970—2026), Japanese video game designer and programmer
- Takuto Kurabayashi (born 1992), Japanese cyclist

== See also ==
- Kuribayashi
