= Kelly Murphy (volleyball) =

American volleyball player

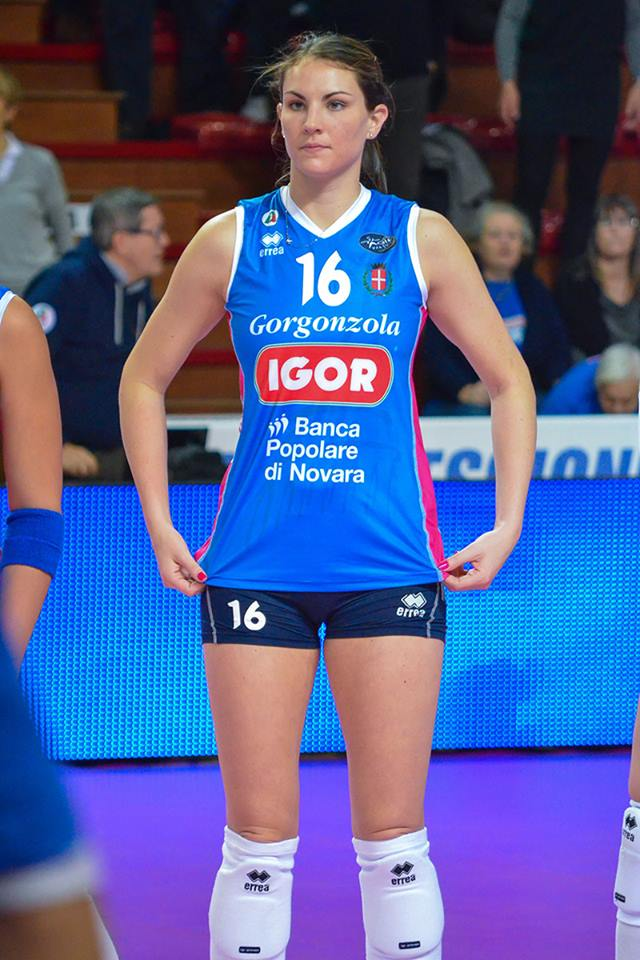

Personal information
- Born: Kelly Ann Murphy; October 20, 1989 (age 37); Wilmington, Illinois, U.S.
- Height: 6 ft 2 in (1.88 m)
- Weight: 174 lb (79 kg)
- Spike: 124 in (315 cm)
- Block: 121 in (307 cm)
- Education: University of Florida

Volleyball information
- Position: Opposite spiker / Setter
- Number: 12 (national team)

Career
Years	Teams
2012; 2013; 2013–2014; 2014–2016; 2016-2017; 2018	Mets de Guaynabo; Vaqueras de Bayamón; AGIL Volley; Ageo Medics; Henan; Shanghai

National team
2013–2018	United States
Medal record
Volleyball
Olympic Games
Bronze medal – third place	2016 Rio de Janeiro	Team
World Championship
Gold medal – first place	2014 Italy	Team
World Grand Champions Cup
Silver medal – second place	2013 Nagoya	Team
World Grand Prix
Gold medal – first place	2015 Omaha	Team
Silver medal – second place	2016 Bangkok	Team
FIVB Nations League
Gold medal – first place	2018 Nanjing	Team
Pan American Cup
Gold medal – first place	2013 Peru

Kelly Ann Murphy (born October 20, 1989) is an American retired indoor volleyball player for the United States women's national volleyball team. Murphy played collegiate volleyball with the University of Florida Gators from 2008 to 2011. Murphy won gold with the national team at the 2014 World Championship and bronze at the 2016 Rio Olympic Games.

== Personal life ==
Born to Scott and Sandy Murphy in Wilmington, Illinois (a village approximately 60 miles southwest of Chicago), Kelly was raised with her two sisters, Jennifer and Mary. Murphy would attend Joliet Catholic Academy in nearby Joliet, Illinois, where she began being recruited by college volleyball coaches in her freshman year. She was considered to be the nation's top high school recruit in her class and was named National Gatorade High School Player of the Year her senior year.

== College ==
Murphy played college women's volleyball at University of Florida. In her freshman season in 2008, Murphy made Florida history, as she was named the program's first ever AVCA National Freshman of the Year. In addition, she was named the SEC Freshman of the Year as well as the AVCA South Region Freshman of the Year and set the school record for career triple-doubles. She also became Florida's first ever freshman to earn SEC Player of the Week honors. As a sophomore in 2009, Murphy was named a Second Team All-American and was also a unanimous first Team All-SEC pick. In her junior year playing for Florida, Murphy was named a First Team All-American and earned SEC Player of the Year. Murphy finished her career seventh in University of Florida history in sets played (447), eighth in kills (1,306), 12th in attacks (2,729), eighth in assists (2,671), 10th in service aces (126), 14th in digs (959), 20th in block assists (253), and 10th in points (1,567.5) while registering school record 30 career triple-doubles and 76 career double-doubles.

== International ==
Murphy was part of the U.S. national team that won the 2014 World Championship gold medal when their team defeated China 3–1 in the final match. In 2016, Murphy played for the United States women's national volleyball team that won an Olympic bronze medal in Rio de Janeiro. In 2018, she was part of the USA's World Championship team which finished fifth overall. Also, Murphy played professionally with clubs in Italy, Japan and China. She was not one of the twelve players named to the 2020 Olympic team.

== Awards ==
=== College ===
- 2008 AVCA All-American Third Team
- 2009 AVCA All-American Second Team
- 2009 NCAA Division I women's volleyball tournament Gainesville regional All-Tournament Team
- 2010 AVCA All-American First Team
- 2011 AVCA All-American First Team
- 2011 NCAA Division I women's volleyball tournament Gainesville regional All-Tournament Team

=== Individual ===
- 2007 Women's Junior Volleyball World Championship - Best Server
- 2013 NORCECA Championship "Most Valuable Player"
- 2013 NORCECA Championship "Best Opposite"
- 2015 V.Premier League - Best Server

=== National team ===
- 2013 Pan-American Volleyball Cup
- 2013 NORCECA Championship
- 2013 FIVB World Grand Champions Cup
- 2014 FIVB World Championship
- 2015 FIVB World Grand Prix
- 2016 FIVB World Grand Prix
- 2016 Summer Olympics
- 2018 FIVB Volleyball Women's Nations League
