= 2015 FIVB Volleyball Women's World Cup =

Volleyball competition held in Japan

2015 Women's World Cup
Tournament details
- Host country: Japan
- Dates: 22 August – 6 September
- Teams: 12
- Venues: 6 (in 6 host cities)

Final positions
- Champions: China (4th title)
- Runners-up: Serbia
- Third place: United States

Tournament awards
- MVP: (China) Zhu Ting

The 2015 FIVB Women's World Cup was held from August 22 to September 6 in Japan. The tournament was a qualification process for the 2016 Summer Olympics in Rio de Janeiro, Brazil.

The top two ranked teams, China and Serbia, qualified for the Olympics, and joined Brazil as they had already secured a berth as the host country.

== Information ==
The FIVB Volleyball World Cup began with signing a contract between Fédération Internationale de Volleyball (FIVB) and Japan Volleyball Association (JVA) for hosting the tournament on 31 January 2013. In this event, Fuji TV had the right to broadcast the tournament. Moreover, the FIVB released the qualification process of the tournament:

1. Host country
2. 2014 World champions
3. 2 teams per Continental confederation considered by World ranking, Continental ranking, or Continental championship

But, on 10 March 2015, the FIVB announced a change of the continental events following each continental confederation's agreement.

1. AVC used the World ranking as of 1 January 2015.
2. CAVB used the African Championship.
3. CEV used the European ranking as of 1 January 2015.
4. CSV held a qualification tournament.
5. NORCECA used the 2015 NORCECA Champion Cup (Final Four).

=== Changes ===
1. Olympics places
  Only the winners and runners-up of the competition could secure the berths in the 2016 Olympic Games. It was different from last edition which three medalists teams joined the Olympics.
2. Qualification format
  The 2015 World Cup changed the format of the competition following the information above. There were not 2 wild card teams like 2011 edition. One of these spots belonged to the World champions, the other one belonged to the 2nd place of a continental event (2011 edition gave tickets to 4 of 5 continents, but 2015 edition gave tickets to all 5 continents).
3. Competition format
  Competition rounds decreased from 4 in 2011 to 3. Combining rounds 1 (3 days) and 2 (2 days) in 2011 to 1 round of 5 days. The hosts also reduced the venues from 8 to 6.
4. Pool ranking criteria
  In 2011 edition, match points was the first criterion, but 2015 changed it to number of matches won. All criteria are shown in section Pool standing procedure.
5. Net touch
  In this edition, players can not touch the whole net and antennas, not just the white band like in 2011 edition.
6. Roster
  All 14 players (maximum 12 regular players and maximum 2 liberos) can play in every match and be named in score sheets.
7. Individual awards
  Individual awards were given to players by positions, unlike previous editions when awards were given to players by volleyball skills.
8. Attribution of points
  FIVB approved the proposal that in case the team hosting the Olympic Games participated in a previous World Cup then they would keep the World Ranking points gained at the previous World Cup.
9. Referee
  It was the first time in the competition when there was a challenge referee. In each match, there was a referee who controlled the challenge system.

== Qualification ==
12 teams participated in the World Cup. Only teams who had not yet qualified for the 2016 Olympic Games could compete in the tournament.

Means of qualification	Date	Venue	Qualified
Host country	31 January 2013	(Switzerland) Lausanne	Japan
2014 World Championship	23 Sep – 12 Oct 2014	Italy	United States
World Ranking for Asian Team	13 October 2014	(Thailand) Bangkok	China
World Ranking for Asian Team	13 October 2014	(Thailand) Bangkok	South Korea
European Ranking	15 October 2014	Luxembourg	Russia
European Ranking	15 October 2014	Luxembourg	Serbia
South American Qualifier	3–7 June 2015	(Argentina) Comodoro Rivadavia	Argentina
South American Qualifier	3–7 June 2015	(Argentina) Comodoro Rivadavia	Peru
2015 NORCECA Champions Cup	5–7 June 2015	(Cuba) Havana	Dominican Republic
2015 NORCECA Champions Cup	5–7 June 2015	(Cuba) Havana	Cuba
2015 African Championship	12–20 June 2015	(Kenya) Nairobi	Kenya
2015 African Championship	12–20 June 2015	(Kenya) Nairobi	Algeria
Total			12

== Squads ==
Maximum of 12 regular players and maximum of 2 liberos can be selected to play in the tournament. The rosters of 14 players of each team can be seen in the article below.

== Venues ==
Site	First round	Second round	Third round	2015 FIVB Volleyball Women's World Cup is located in Japan
A	Tokyo	Sendai	Nagoya	2015 FIVB Volleyball Women's World Cup is located in Japan
A	Yoyogi National Gymnasium	Sendai Gymnasium	Nippon Gaishi Hall	2015 FIVB Volleyball Women's World Cup is located in Japan
A	Capacity: 13,291	Capacity: 7,000	Capacity: 10,000	2015 FIVB Volleyball Women's World Cup is located in Japan
B	Matsumoto	Okayama	Komaki	2015 FIVB Volleyball Women's World Cup is located in Japan
B	Matsumoto City Gymnasium	Momotaro Arena	Park Arena Komaki	2015 FIVB Volleyball Women's World Cup is located in Japan
B	Capacity: 6,000	Capacity: 11,000	Capacity: 5,000	2015 FIVB Volleyball Women's World Cup is located in Japan

== Format ==
Group 1	Group 2
Japan (Host)	United States (1)
Dominican Republic (6)	China (3)
Russia (7)	Serbia (8)
Argentina (14)	South Korea (10)
Kenya (19)	Peru (23)
Cuba (26)	Algeria (25)

The competition system of the 2015 World Cup for women is the single Round-Robin system. Each team plays once against each of the 11 remaining teams.
The teams were divided into 2 groups of 6 teams each. In round 1, total 30 matches in 5 days, each team plays against the other teams from the same group. For rounds 2 and 3, total 36 matches in 6 days, each teams play against the teams from another group.
The pools composition followed the Serpentine system based on the World ranking where the host team was at the top position. Numbers in brackets denoted the FIVB World Ranking as of 13 October 2014 except the hosts who ranked 4th.

== Pool standing procedure ==
1. Number of matches won
2. Match points
3. Sets ratio
4. Points ratio
5. Result of the last match between the tied teams

Match won 3–0 or 3–1: 3 match points for the winner, 0 match points for the loser
Match won 3–2: 2 match points for the winner, 1 match point for the loser

== Results ==
Pos	Team	Pld	W	L	Pts	SW	SL	SR	SPW	SPL	SPR
1	China	11	10	1	30	30	7	4.286	900	658	1.368
2	Serbia	11	10	1	26	31	11	2.818	964	739	1.304
3	United States	11	9	2	28	29	7	4.143	839	617	1.360
4	Russia	11	9	2	27	30	8	3.750	889	702	1.266
5	Japan	11	7	4	22	27	14	1.929	922	779	1.184
6	South Korea	11	5	6	16	18	19	0.947	816	787	1.037
7	Dominican Republic	11	5	6	16	18	21	0.857	835	859	0.972
8	Argentina	11	4	7	12	15	23	0.652	738	819	0.901
9	Cuba	11	4	7	11	13	25	0.520	740	876	0.845
10	Kenya	11	2	9	5	7	29	0.241	683	844	0.809
11	Peru	11	1	10	5	9	30	0.300	732	899	0.814
12	Algeria	11	0	11	0	0	33	0.000	326	825	0.395

All times are Japan Standard Time (UTC+09:00).

=== First round ===
==== Site A ====
Date	Time		Score		Set 1	Set 2	Set 3	Set 4	Set 5	Total	Report
22 Aug	12:10	Dominican Republic	0–3	Russia	15–25	18–25	18–25			51–75	P2 P3
22 Aug	14:40	Cuba	3–1	Kenya	27–25	25–23	12–25	25–22		89–95	P2 P3
22 Aug	19:20	Argentina	0–3	Japan	16–25	19–25	12–25			47–75	P2 P3
23 Aug	12:10	Kenya	0–3	Dominican Republic	26–28	24–26	17–25			67–79	P2 P3
23 Aug	15:10	Argentina	3–0	Cuba	25–15	25–21	25–23			75–59	P2 P3
23 Aug	19:20	Japan	2–3	Russia	25–12	18–25	21–25	25–23	13–15	102–100	P2 P3
24 Aug	12:10	Dominican Republic	3–1	Argentina	25–21	25–22	19–25	25–15		94–83	P2 P3
24 Aug	15:10	Russia	3–0	Kenya	25–16	25–21	25–21			75–58	P2 P3
24 Aug	19:20	Cuba	0–3	Japan	15–25	12–25	16–25			43–75	P2 P3
26 Aug	12:10	Argentina	0–3	Russia	10–25	10–25	16–25			36–75	P2 P3
26 Aug	15:10	Cuba	1–3	Dominican Republic	22–25	22–25	25–18	23–25		92–93	P2 P3
26 Aug	19:20	Japan	3–0	Kenya	25–15	25–20	25–12			75–47	P2 P3
27 Aug	12:10	Russia	3–0	Cuba	25–19	25–13	25–18			75–50	P2 P3
27 Aug	15:10	Kenya	0–3	Argentina	12–25	17–25	20–25			49–75	P2 P3
27 Aug	19:20	Dominican Republic	2–3	Japan	18–25	25–20	32–30	15–25	13–15	103–115	P2 P3

==== Site B ====
Date	Time		Score		Set 1	Set 2	Set 3	Set 4	Set 5	Total	Report
22 Aug	12:10	United States	3–0	South Korea	25–15	25–22	25–15			75–52	P2 P3
22 Aug	15:10	Serbia	1–3	China	25–19	23–25	15–25	19–25		82–94	P2 P3
22 Aug	18:40	Peru	3–0	Algeria	25–16	25–13	25–16			75–45	P2 P3
23 Aug	12:10	South Korea	3–0	Peru	25–19	25–18	25–18			75–55	P2 P3
23 Aug	15:10	China	3–0	Algeria	25–5	25–11	25–8			75–24	P2 P3
23 Aug	18:40	Serbia	3–2	United States	25–20	22–25	18–25	25–19	15–6	105–95	P2 P3
24 Aug	12:10	Algeria	0–3	South Korea	8–25	9–25	19–25			36–75	P2 P3
24 Aug	15:10	Peru	0–3	Serbia	10–25	17–25	10–25			37–75	P2 P3
24 Aug	18:40	United States	3–0	China	25–23	25–17	25–23			75–63	P2 P3
26 Aug	12:10	United States	3–0	Peru	25–17	25–15	25–12			75–44	P2 P3
26 Aug	15:10	Serbia	3–0	Algeria	25–7	25–11	25–3			75–21	P2 P3
26 Aug	18:40	China	3–1	South Korea	23–25	25–15	25–20	25–23		98–83	P2 P3
27 Aug	12:10	Algeria	0–3	United States	7–25	2–25	5–25			14–75	P2 P3
27 Aug	15:10	Peru	0–3	China	11–25	18–25	17–25			46–75	P2 P3
27 Aug	18:40	South Korea	0–3	Serbia	16–25	19–25	16–25			51–75	P2 P3

=== Second round ===
==== Site A ====
Date	Time		Score		Set 1	Set 2	Set 3	Set 4	Set 5	Total	Report
30 Aug	12:10	Dominican Republic	0–3	Serbia	18–25	22–25	22–25			62–75	P2 P3
30 Aug	15:10	Russia	3–0	South Korea	25–20	26–24	25–22			76–66	P2 P3
30 Aug	19:20	Japan	3–0	Peru	25–19	25–21	25–15			75–55	P2 P3
31 Aug	12:10	Dominican Republic	3–1	Peru	25–18	25–19	22–25	25–17		97–79	P2 P3
31 Aug	15:10	Russia	2–3	Serbia	25–22	25–22	14–25	23–25	12–15	99–109	P2 P3
31 Aug	19:20	Japan	3–0	South Korea	25–17	26–24	25–17			76–58	P2 P3
1 Sep	12:10	Russia	3–0	Peru	25–14	25–10	25–20			75–44	P2 P3
1 Sep	15:10	Dominican Republic	1–3	South Korea	25–18	17–25	23–25	18–25		83–93	P2 P3
1 Sep	19:20	Japan	2–3	Serbia	26–24	17–25	14–25	25–21	9–15	91–110	P2 P3

==== Site B ====
Date	Time		Score		Set 1	Set 2	Set 3	Set 4	Set 5	Total	Report
30 Aug	12:10	Argentina	3–0	Algeria	25–11	25–8	25–11			75–30	P2 P3
30 Aug	15:10	Kenya	0–3	United States	15–25	16–25	13–25			44–75	P2 P3
30 Aug	18:40	Cuba	0–3	China	19–25	10–25	14–25			43–75	P2 P3
31 Aug	12:10	Cuba	3–0	Algeria	25–17	25–16	25–14			75–47	P2 P3
31 Aug	15:10	Argentina	0–3	United States	16–25	19–25	14–25			49–75	P2 P3
31 Aug	18:40	Kenya	0–3	China	7–25	15–25	14–25			36–75	P2 P3
1 Sep	12:10	Kenya	3–0	Algeria	25–14	25–11	25–11			75–36	P2 P3
1 Sep	15:10	Argentina	0–3	China	14–25	15–25	20–25			49–75	P2 P3
1 Sep	18:40	Cuba	0–3	United States	15–25	11–25	15–25			41–75	P2 P3

=== Third round ===
==== Site A ====
Date	Time		Score		Set 1	Set 2	Set 3	Set 4	Set 5	Total	Report
4 Sep	12:10	Dominican Republic	0–3	China	16–25	17–25	19–25			52–75	P2 P3
4 Sep	15:10	Russia	3–0	United States	25–17	31–29	25–23			81–69	P2 P3
4 Sep	19:20	Japan	3–0	Algeria	25–8	25–10	25–6			75–24	P2 P3
5 Sep	12:10	Dominican Republic	3–0	Algeria	25–11	25–12	25–7			75–30	P2 P3
5 Sep	15:10	Russia	1–3	China	23–25	15–25	25–23	20–25		83–98	P2 P3
5 Sep	19:20	Japan	1–3	United States	25–20	23–25	20–25	10–25		78–95	P2 P3
6 Sep	12:10	Russia	3–0	Algeria	25–5	25–6	25–8			75–19	P2 P3
6 Sep	15:10	Dominican Republic	0–3	United States	10–25	19–25	17–25			46–75	P2 P3
6 Sep	19:20	Japan	1–3	China	17–25	25–22	21–25	22–25		85–97	P2 P3

==== Site B ====
Date	Time		Score		Set 1	Set 2	Set 3	Set 4	Set 5	Total	Report
4 Sep	12:10	Argentina	3–2	Peru	16–25	25–20	21–25	25–22	15–12	102–104	P2 P3
4 Sep	15:10	Cuba	0–3	Serbia	22–25	19–25	15–25			56–75	P2 P3
4 Sep	18:40	Kenya	0–3	South Korea	16–25	16–25	19–25			51–75	P2 P3
5 Sep	12:10	Cuba	3–1	Peru	13–25	25–16	25–18	25–19		88–78	P2 P3
5 Sep	15:10	Kenya	0–3	Serbia	11–25	14–25	19–25			44–75	P2 P3
5 Sep	18:40	Argentina	0–3	South Korea	21–25	17–25	20–25			58–75	P2 P3
6 Sep	11:10	Kenya	3–2	Peru	23–25	29–27	25–27	25–23	15–13	117–115	P2 P3
6 Sep	14:10	Argentina	2–3	Serbia	16–25	19–25	25–20	25–23	4–15	89–108	P2 P3
6 Sep	17:10	Cuba	3–2	South Korea	25–22	18–25	16–25	30–28	15–13	104–113	P2 P3

== Final standing ==
Rank	Team
1st place, gold medalist(s)	China
2nd place, silver medalist(s)	Serbia
3rd place, bronze medalist(s)	United States
4	Russia
5	Japan
6	South Korea
7	Dominican Republic
8	Argentina
9	Cuba
10	Kenya
11	Peru
12	Algeria

Qualified for the 2016 Summer Olympics

2015 Women's World Cup champions

China
4th title

Team roster
Yuan Xinyue, Zhu Ting, Shen Jingsi, Yang Junjing, Wei Qiuyue, Zeng Chunlei (c), Zhang Changning, Zhang Xiaoya, Lin Li, Ding Xia, Yan Ni, Wang Mengjie, Liu Yanhan, Liu Xiaotong
Head coach
Lang Ping

== Awards ==
- Most valuable player
  (China) Zhu Ting
- Best Setter
  (Dominican Republic) Niverka Marte
- Best Outside Hitters
  (Serbia) Brankica Mihajlović
  (Russia) Tatiana Kosheleva
- Best Middle Blockers
  (Cuba) Daymara Lescay
  (United States) TeTori Dixon
- Best Opposite Hitter
  (Russia) Nataliya Obmochaeva
- Best libero
  (Dominican Republic) Brenda Castillo

== Statistics leaders ==
Best Scorers
Rank	Name	Points
1	(South Korea) Kim Yeon-koung	197
2	(Russia) Nataliya Obmochaeva	161
3	(Serbia) Tijana Bošković	159
4	(Japan) Miyu Nagaoka	156
5	(Japan) Sarina Koga	150
6	(Kenya) Mercy Moim	146
7	(Serbia) Brankica Mihajlovic	142
7	(Russia) Tatiana Kosheleva	142
9	(China) Zhu Ting	141
10	(South Korea) Kim Hee-jin	136

Best Spikers
Rank	Name	%Succ
1	(China) Zhu Ting	52.07
2	(Serbia) Brankica Mihajlovic	51.60
3	(Russia) Tatiana Kosheleva	50.43
4	(United States) Nicole Fawcett	50.00
5	(Serbia) Tijana Bošković	48.70
6	(Russia) Nataliya Obmochaeva	48.58
7	(China) Zhang Changning	46.05
8	(South Korea) Kim Yeon-koung	45.64
9	(Dominican Republic) Yonkaira Peña	45.57
10	(China) Zeng Chunlei	44.10

Best Blockers
Rank	Name	Avg/set
1	(Cuba) Alena Rojas	0.74
2	(Cuba) Daymara Lescay	0.74
3	(China) Zhu Ting	0.68
4	(United States) TeTori Dixon	0.61
5	(Russia) Irina Fetisova	0.61
6	(Russia) Tatiana Kosheleva	0.61
7	(Argentina) Emilce Sosa	0.58
8	(United States) Nicole Fawcett	0.58
9	(Kenya) Ruth Jepngetich	0.58
10	(Serbia) Milena Rašić	0.57

Best Servers
Rank	Name	Avg/set
1	(China) Zhang Changning	0.57
2	(Japan) Miyu Nagaoka	0.44
3	(Peru) Katherine Regalado	0.41
4	(Japan) Sarina Koga	0.39
5	(Japan) Haruka Miyashita	0.37
6	(Dominican Republic) Prisilla Rivera	0.36
7	(China) Yan Ni	0.35
8	(United States) Foluke Akinradewo	0.31
9	(Serbia) Jovana Stevanović	0.31
10	(Serbia) Milena Rašić	0.29

Best Setters
Rank	Name	Avg/set
1	(Dominican Republic) Niverka Marte	7.67
2	(Japan) Haruka Miyashita	6.98
3	(Russia) Ekaterina Kosianenko	6.68
4	(Serbia) Maja Ognjenović	6.67
5	(United States) Alisha Glass	6.56
6	(China) Shen Jingsi	5.89
7	(Peru) Zoila La Rosa	5.51
8	(Argentina) Yael Castiglione	5.24
9	(Cuba) Yamila Hernández	4.76
10	(United States) Molly Kreklow	4.47

Best Diggers
Rank	Name	Avg/set
1	(Dominican Republic) Brenda Castillo	5.15
2	(Argentina) Tatiana Rizzo	3.71
3	(Peru) Susan Egoavil	3.64
4	(Russia) Anna Malova	3.08
5	(Kenya) Brackcides Khadambi	2.50
6	(Cuba) Emily Borrell	2.45
7	(United States) Kayla Banwarth	2.44
8	(Peru) Katherinne Olemar	2.44
9	(Algeria) Ryma Mebarki	2.27
10	(Japan) Miyu Nagaoka	2.17

Best Receivers
Rank	Name	%Eff
1	(Japan) Sarina Koga	57.78
2	(Japan) Saori Kimura	56.68
3	(Russia) Anna Malova	54.31
4	(South Korea) Kim Yeon-koung	53.89
5	(Serbia) Tijana Malešević	51.79
6	(Peru) Katherinne Olemar	48.07
7	(United States) Kimberly Hill	45.83
8	(Russia) Yana Shcherban	44.09
9	(Dominican Republic) Yonkaira Peña	40.65
10	(Peru) Karla Ortiz	40.31
