= Lonneke Slöetjes =

Dutch volleyball player (born 1990)

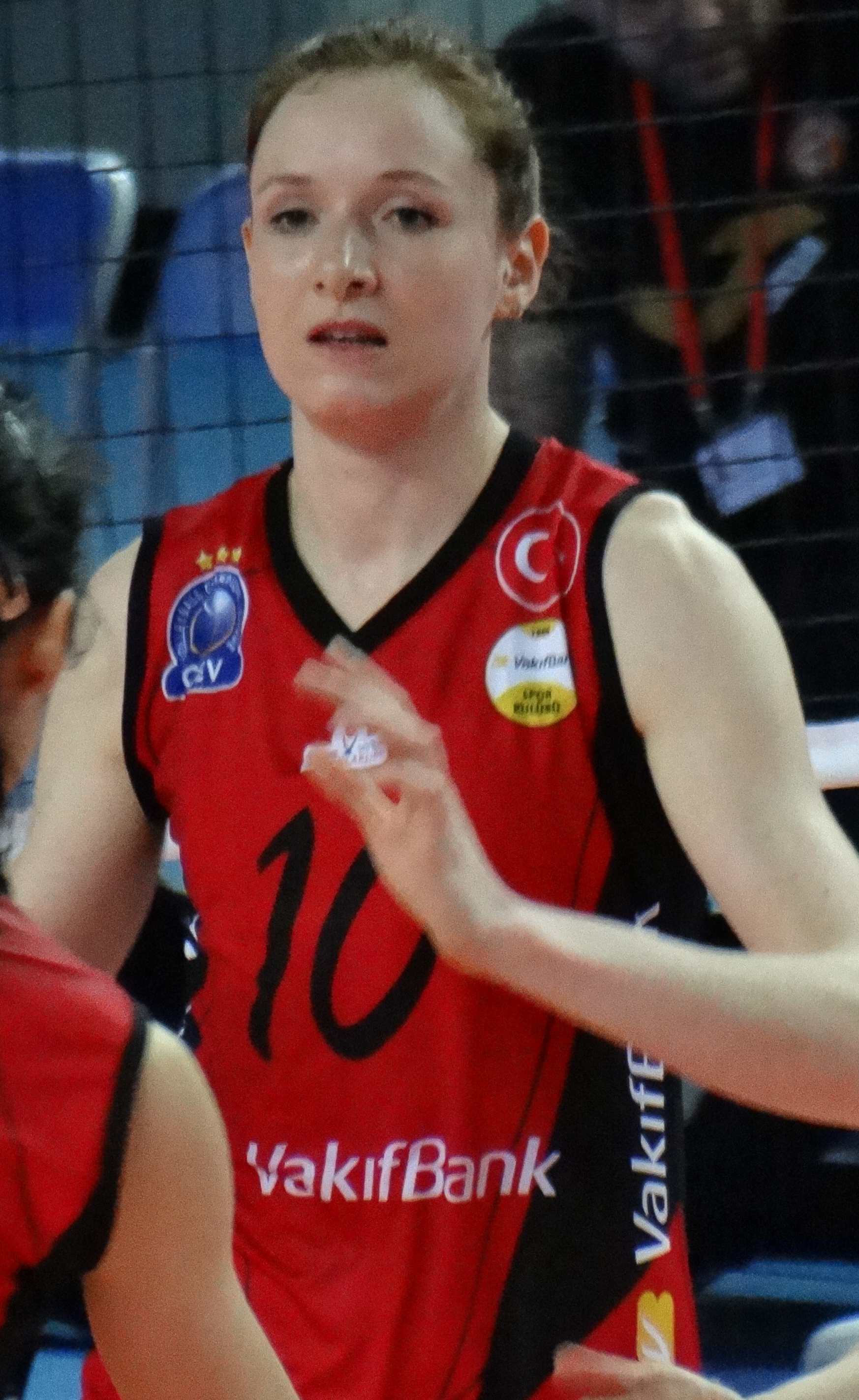
- Slöetjes in 2018

Personal information
- Nationality: Dutch
- Born: 15 November 1990 (age 35); Varsseveld, Netherlands
- Height: 1.96 m (6 ft 5 in)
- Weight: 76 kg (168 lb)
- Spike: 322 cm (127 in)
- Block: 315 cm (124 in)

Volleyball information
- Position: Opposite spiker / Wing spiker
- Current club: Pallavolo Scandicci
- Number: 10

Career
Years	Teams
2006–2009	Longa '59
2009–2011	Heutink Pollux
2011–2013	USC Münster
2013–2014	Unendo Yamamay Busto Arsizio
2014–2015	Schweriner SC
2015–2019	Vakifbank Istanbul
2019-	Pallavolo Scandicci

National team
2007–2020	Netherlands
Honours
Women's volleyball
Representing the Netherlands
European Championship
Silver medal – second place	2015 Belgium/Netherlands
Silver medal – second place	2017 Azerbaijan/Georgia
World Grand Prix
Bronze medal – third place	2016 Bangkok

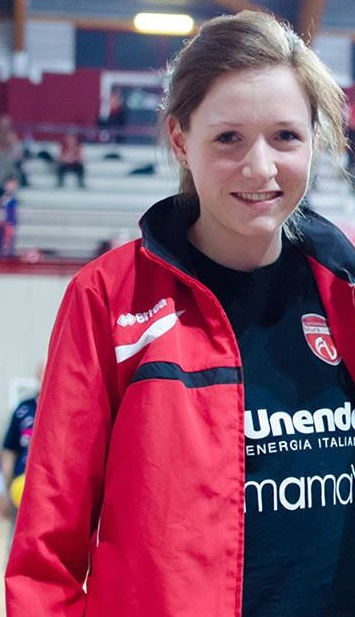
Slöetjes in 2014

Lonneke Slöetjes (born 15 November 1990) is a Dutch former volleyball player, who played as an opposite spiker. She was a member of the Women's National Team from 2007 to 2020. She officially retired in February 2021.

== Career ==
Slöetjes started playing at VC Varsseveld. In 2015, she played with the national team at the 2015 European Games in Baku, Azerbaijan. During the 2016 Olympic Games, Slöetjes helped the Netherlands reach their first semifinal, finishing fourth and being chosen as Best Opposite Spiker of the tournament. She won the Best Opposite Spiker award in the 2016 FIVB World Grand Prix.

Slöetjes won the 2016–17 CEV Champions League gold medal with VakıfBank Istanbul when her team defeated the Italian Imoco Volley Conegliano 3-0 and she was also awarded Best Opposite Spiker.

== Awards ==
=== Individuals ===
- 2015 Montreux Volley Masters "Best opposite spiker"
- 2015 European Championship "Best opposite spiker"
- 2016 Europe Olympic Qualification Tournament "Best opposite spiker"
- 2015-16 Turkish Women's Volleyball League "Best opposite spiker"
- 2016 World Olympic Qualification Tournament "Best opposite spiker"
- 2016 FIVB World Grand Prix "Best opposite spiker"
- 2016 Olympic Games "Best opposite spiker"
- 2016-17 CEV Champions League "Best opposite spiker"
- 2017 European Championship "Best opposite spiker"

=== Clubs ===
- 2015-16 CEV Champions League - Runner-Up, with Vakıfbank
- 2016–17 CEV Champions League - Champion, with VakıfBank
- 2017–18 CEV Champions League - Champion, with VakıfBank
- 2015–16 Turkish League - Champion, with VakıfBank
- 2017–18 Turkish League - Champion, with VakıfBank
- 2018–19 Turkish League - Champion, with VakıfBank
- 2016 Club World Championship - Bronze medal, with VakıfBank
- 2017 Club World Championship - Champion, with VakıfBank
- 2018 Club World Championship - Champion, with VakıfBank
- 2017 Turkish Super Cup - Champion, with VakıfBank

Awards
Preceded by -	Best Opposite of European Championship; 2015; 2017	Succeeded by (Serbia) Tijana Bošković
Preceded by (Russia) Nataliya Goncharova	Best Opposite of FIVB World Grand Prix; 2016	Succeeded by (Serbia) Tijana Bošković
Preceded by -	Best Opposite of Olympic Games; 2016	Succeeded by (Serbia) Tijana Bošković
Preceded by (Germany) Margareta Kozuch	Best Opposite of CEV Champions League; 2016-2017	Succeeded by (Cuba) Ana Cleger
