= Linli =

Linli may refer to:

- Linli County, a county in Hunan, China
- Linli Township (林里乡), a township in Mianning County, Sichuan, China

== See also ==
- Lin Li (disambiguation)
