= Volleyball at the 2016 Summer Olympics – Women's tournament =

Women's volleyball at the Games of the XXXI Olympiad
- Venue: Ginásio do Maracanãzinho
- Date: 6–20 August 2016
- Competitors: 144 from 12 nations

Medalists
1st place, gold medalist(s)		China (3rd title)
2nd place, silver medalist(s)		Serbia
3rd place, bronze medalist(s)		United States

The women's tournament in volleyball at the 2016 Summer Olympics was the 14th edition of the event at an Olympic Games, organised by the world's governing body, the FIVB, in conjunction with the IOC. It was held in Rio de Janeiro, Brazil from 6 to 20 August 2016.

China won their third gold by defeating Serbia in the final. The United States won bronze by winning against the Netherlands.

The medals for the competition were presented by Yu Zaiqing, People's Republic of China; Anita DeFrantz, United States of America; and Chang Ung, Democratic People's Republic of Korea; members of the International Olympic Committee, and the gifts were presented by Ary Graça, Cristóbal Marte Hoffiz and Aleksandar Boričić, President and Executive Vice-Presidents of the FIVB.

== Competition schedule ==
P	Preliminary round	¼	Quarter-finals	½	Semi-finals	B	Bronze medal match	F	Final

Sat 6	Sun 7	Mon 8	Tue 9	Wed 10	Thu 11	Fri 12	Sat 13	Sun 14	Mon 15	Tue 16	Wed 17	Thu 18	Fri 19	Sat 20	
P		P		P		P		P		¼		½		B	F

== Qualification ==
Means of qualification	Date	Venue	Vacancies	Qualified
Host country	—N/a	—N/a	1	Brazil
2015 World Cup	22 August – 6 September 2015	Japan	2	China
2015 World Cup	22 August – 6 September 2015	Japan	2	Serbia
European Qualifier	4–9 January 2016	(Turkey) Ankara	1	Russia
South American Qualifier	6–10 January 2016	(Argentina) Bariloche	1	Argentina
North American Qualifier	7–9 January 2016	(United States) Lincoln	1	United States
African Qualifier	12–16 February 2016	(Cameroon) Yaoundé	1	Cameroon
Asian Qualifier	14–22 May 2016	(Japan) Tokyo	1	South Korea
1st World Qualifier	14–22 May 2016	(Japan) Tokyo	3	Italy
1st World Qualifier	14–22 May 2016	(Japan) Tokyo	3	Netherlands
1st World Qualifier	14–22 May 2016	(Japan) Tokyo	3	Japan
2nd World Qualifier	20–22 May 2016	(Puerto Rico) San Juan	1	Puerto Rico
Total			12	

== Pools composition ==
Teams were seeded following the Serpentine system according to their FIVB World Ranking as of October 2015. FIVB reserved the right to seed the hosts as head of Pool A regardless of the World Ranking. Rankings are shown in brackets except Hosts who ranked 3rd. The pools were confirmed on 23 May 2016.

Pool A	Pool B
Brazil (Hosts)	United States (1)
Russia (4)	China (2)
Japan (5)	Serbia (6)
South Korea (9)	Italy (8)
Argentina (12)	Netherlands (14)
Cameroon (21)	Puerto Rico (16)

== Venue ==
Rio de Janeiro, Brazil
Ginásio do Maracanãzinho
Capacity: 11,800
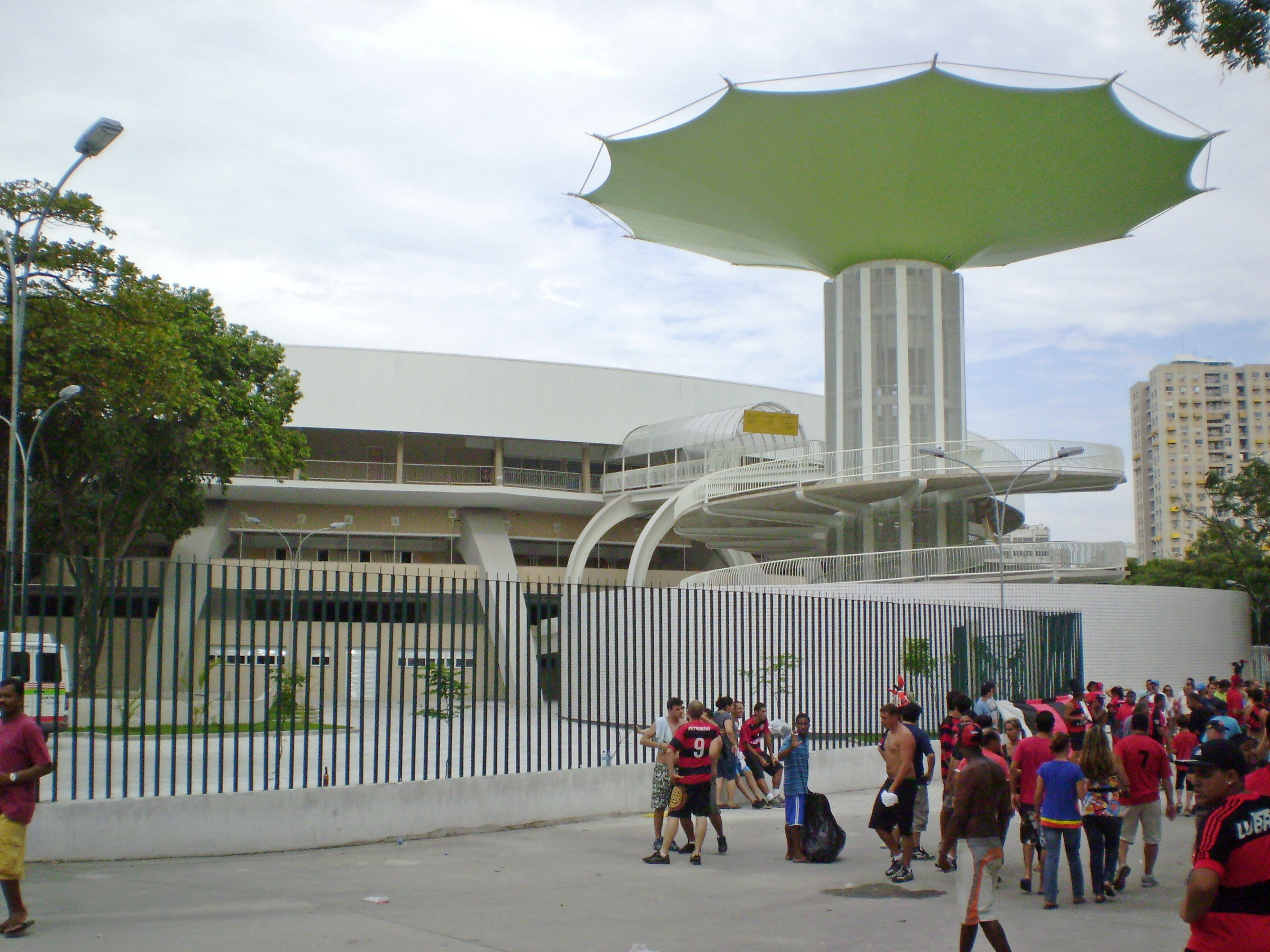

== Format ==
The preliminary round was a competition between the twelve teams divided into two pools of six teams. This round, the teams competed in a single round-robin format. The four highest ranked teams in each group advanced to the knockout stage (quarter-finals). The sixth placed teams in each pool was ranked eleventh in this competition. The fifth placed teams in each pool was ranked ninth.
The knockout stage followed the single-elimination format. The losers of the quarter-finals were eliminated and ranked fifth. The quarter-final winners played in the semi-finals. The winners of the semi-finals competed for gold medals and the losers played for bronze medals.

== Pool standing procedure ==
In order to establish the ranking of teams after the group stage, the following criteria should be implemented:

1. Number of matches won
2. Match points
3. Set ratio
4. Setpoint ratio
5. Results between tied teams (head-to-head record)

Match won 3–0 or 3–1: 3 match points for the winner, 0 match points for the loser
Match won 3–2: 2 match points for the winner, 1 match point for the loser

== Referees ==
The following referees were selected for the tournament.

- (Argentina) Hernán Casamiquela
- (Belgium) Arturo Di Giacomo
- (Brazil) Rogerio Espicalsky
- (Brazil) Paulo Turci
- (China) Liu Jiang
- (Dominican Republic) Denny Cespedes
- (Egypt) Nasr Shaaban
- (Germany) Heike Kraft
- (Iran) Mohammad Shahmiri
- (Italy) Fabrizio Pasquali
- (Mexico) Luis Macias
- (Poland) Piotr Dudek
- (Qatar) Ibrahim Al-Naama
- (Russia) Andrey Zenovich
- (Serbia) Vladimir Simonović
- (Slovakia) Juraj Mokrý
- (South Korea) Kang Joo-hee
- (Spain) Susana Rodríguez
- (Tunisia) Taoufik Boudaya
- (United States) Patricia Rolf

== Preliminary round ==
All times are Brasília Time (UTC−03:00).

=== Pool A ===
Pos	Team	Pld	W	L	Pts	SW	SL	SR	SPW	SPL	SPR	Qualification
1	Brazil (H)	5	5	0	15	15	0	MAX	377	272	1.386	Quarter-finals
2	Russia	5	4	1	12	12	4	3.000	393	323	1.217	Quarter-finals
3	South Korea	5	3	2	9	10	7	1.429	384	372	1.032	Quarter-finals
4	Japan	5	2	3	6	7	9	0.778	347	364	0.953	Quarter-finals
5	Argentina	5	1	4	2	3	14	0.214	319	407	0.784	
6	Cameroon	5	0	5	1	2	15	0.133	328	410	0.800	

Source: FIVB
Rules for classification: Tiebreakers
(H) Host

6 August 2016; 09:30	Japan	1–3	South Korea	Ginásio do Maracanãzinho, Rio de Janeiro; Attendance: 5,760; Referees: Denny Cespedes (DOM), Patricia Rolf (USA)
6 August 2016; 09:30	(25–19, 15–25, 17–25, 21–25); Result Statistics			Ginásio do Maracanãzinho, Rio de Janeiro; Attendance: 5,760; Referees: Denny Cespedes (DOM), Patricia Rolf (USA)

6 August 2016; 15:00	Brazil	3–0	Cameroon	Ginásio do Maracanãzinho, Rio de Janeiro; Attendance: 7,890; Referees: Heike Kraft (GER), Liu Jiang (CHN)
6 August 2016; 15:00	(25–14, 25–21, 25–13); Result Statistics			Ginásio do Maracanãzinho, Rio de Janeiro; Attendance: 7,890; Referees: Heike Kraft (GER), Liu Jiang (CHN)

6 August 2016; 20:30	Russia	3–0	Argentina	Ginásio do Maracanãzinho, Rio de Janeiro; Attendance: 5,437; Referees: Ibrahim Al-Naama (QAT), Luis Macias (MEX)
6 August 2016; 20:30	(25–13, 25–10, 25–16); Result Statistics			Ginásio do Maracanãzinho, Rio de Janeiro; Attendance: 5,437; Referees: Ibrahim Al-Naama (QAT), Luis Macias (MEX)

8 August 2016; 11:35	Japan	3–0	Cameroon	Ginásio do Maracanãzinho, Rio de Janeiro; Attendance: 5,400; Referees: Rogerio Espicalsky (BRA), Hernán Casamiquela (ARG)
8 August 2016; 11:35	(25–20, 25–15, 25–17); Result Statistics			Ginásio do Maracanãzinho, Rio de Janeiro; Attendance: 5,400; Referees: Rogerio Espicalsky (BRA), Hernán Casamiquela (ARG)

8 August 2016; 20:30	Russia	3–1	South Korea	Ginásio do Maracanãzinho, Rio de Janeiro; Attendance: 5,398; Referees: Piotr Dudek (POL), Ibrahim Al-Naama (QAT)
8 August 2016; 20:30	(25–23, 23–25, 25–23, 25–14); Result Statistics			Ginásio do Maracanãzinho, Rio de Janeiro; Attendance: 5,398; Referees: Piotr Dudek (POL), Ibrahim Al-Naama (QAT)

8 August 2016; 22:35	Brazil	3–0	Argentina	Ginásio do Maracanãzinho, Rio de Janeiro; Attendance: 7,651; Referees: Nasr Shaaban (EGY), Fabrizio Pasquali (ITA)
8 August 2016; 22:35	(25–16, 25–19, 25–11); Result Statistics			Ginásio do Maracanãzinho, Rio de Janeiro; Attendance: 7,651; Referees: Nasr Shaaban (EGY), Fabrizio Pasquali (ITA)

10 August 2016; 17:05	Russia	3–0	Cameroon	Ginásio do Maracanãzinho, Rio de Janeiro; Attendance: 6,396; Referees: Ibrahim Al-Naama (QAT), Mohammad Shahmiri (IRI)
10 August 2016; 17:05	(25–19, 25–22, 25–23); Result Statistics			Ginásio do Maracanãzinho, Rio de Janeiro; Attendance: 6,396; Referees: Ibrahim Al-Naama (QAT), Mohammad Shahmiri (IRI)

10 August 2016; 20:30	South Korea	3–0	Argentina	Ginásio do Maracanãzinho, Rio de Janeiro; Attendance: 7,248; Referees: Patricia Rolf (USA), Taoufik Boudaya (TUN)
10 August 2016; 20:30	(25–18, 25–20, 25–23); Result Statistics			Ginásio do Maracanãzinho, Rio de Janeiro; Attendance: 7,248; Referees: Patricia Rolf (USA), Taoufik Boudaya (TUN)

10 August 2016; 22:35	Brazil	3–0	Japan	Ginásio do Maracanãzinho, Rio de Janeiro; Attendance: 8,759; Referees: Susana Rodríguez (ESP), Luís Macias (MEX)
10 August 2016; 22:35	(25–18, 25–18, 25–22); Result Statistics			Ginásio do Maracanãzinho, Rio de Janeiro; Attendance: 8,759; Referees: Susana Rodríguez (ESP), Luís Macias (MEX)

12 August 2016; 11:35	Argentina	3–2	Cameroon	Ginásio do Maracanãzinho, Rio de Janeiro; Attendance: 5,345; Referees: Taoufik Boudaya (TUN), Arturo di Giacomo (BEL)
12 August 2016; 11:35	(19–25, 25–19, 26–28, 25–21, 15–13); Result Statistics			Ginásio do Maracanãzinho, Rio de Janeiro; Attendance: 5,345; Referees: Taoufik Boudaya (TUN), Arturo di Giacomo (BEL)

12 August 2016; 20:30	Russia	3–0	Japan	Ginásio do Maracanãzinho, Rio de Janeiro; Attendance: 7,448; Referees: Mohammad Shahmiri (IRI), Heike Kraft (GER)
12 August 2016; 20:30	(25–14, 30–28, 25–18); Result Statistics			Ginásio do Maracanãzinho, Rio de Janeiro; Attendance: 7,448; Referees: Mohammad Shahmiri (IRI), Heike Kraft (GER)

12 August 2016; 22:35	Brazil	3–0	South Korea	Ginásio do Maracanãzinho, Rio de Janeiro; Attendance: 8,790; Referees: Patricia Rolf (USA), Liu Jiang (CHN)
12 August 2016; 22:35	(25–17, 25–13, 27–25); Result Statistics			Ginásio do Maracanãzinho, Rio de Janeiro; Attendance: 8,790; Referees: Patricia Rolf (USA), Liu Jiang (CHN)

14 August 2016; 11:35	South Korea	3–0	Cameroon	Ginásio do Maracanãzinho, Rio de Janeiro; Attendance: 6,893; Referees: Luis Macias (MEX), Rogerio Espicalsky (BRA)
14 August 2016; 11:35	(25–15, 25–22, 25–20); Result Statistics			Ginásio do Maracanãzinho, Rio de Janeiro; Attendance: 6,893; Referees: Luis Macias (MEX), Rogerio Espicalsky (BRA)

14 August 2016; 20:30	Japan	3–0	Argentina	Ginásio do Maracanãzinho, Rio de Janeiro; Attendance: 5,939; Referees: Denny Cespedes (DOM), Fabrizio Pasquali (ITA)
14 August 2016; 20:30	(25–23, 25–16, 26–24); Result Statistics			Ginásio do Maracanãzinho, Rio de Janeiro; Attendance: 5,939; Referees: Denny Cespedes (DOM), Fabrizio Pasquali (ITA)

14 August 2016; 22:35	Brazil	3–0	Russia	Ginásio do Maracanãzinho, Rio de Janeiro; Attendance: 8,892; Referees: Nasr Shaaban (EGY), Taoufik Boudaya (TUN)
14 August 2016; 22:35	(25–23, 25–21, 25–21); Result Statistics			Ginásio do Maracanãzinho, Rio de Janeiro; Attendance: 8,892; Referees: Nasr Shaaban (EGY), Taoufik Boudaya (TUN)

=== Pool B ===
Pos	Team	Pld	W	L	Pts	SW	SL	SR	SPW	SPL	SPR	Qualification
1	United States	5	5	0	14	15	5	3.000	470	400	1.175	Quarter-finals
2	Netherlands	5	4	1	11	14	7	2.000	455	425	1.071	Quarter-finals
3	Serbia	5	3	2	10	12	6	2.000	410	394	1.041	Quarter-finals
4	China	5	2	3	7	9	9	1.000	398	389	1.023	Quarter-finals
5	Italy	5	1	4	3	4	12	0.333	351	374	0.939	
6	Puerto Rico	5	0	5	0	0	15	0.000	277	379	0.731	

Source: FIVB
Rules for classification: Tiebreakers

6 August 2016; 11:35	China	2–3	Netherlands	Ginásio do Maracanãzinho, Rio de Janeiro; Attendance: 6,410; Referees: Susana Rodríguez (ESP), Paulo Turci (BRA)
6 August 2016; 11:35	(23–25, 25–21, 25–18, 22–25, 13–15); Result Statistics			Ginásio do Maracanãzinho, Rio de Janeiro; Attendance: 6,410; Referees: Susana Rodríguez (ESP), Paulo Turci (BRA)

6 August 2016; 17:05	United States	3–0	Puerto Rico	Ginásio do Maracanãzinho, Rio de Janeiro; Attendance: 6,832; Referees: Taoufik Boudaya (TUN), Kang Joo-hee (KOR)
6 August 2016; 17:05	(25–17, 25–22, 25–17); Result Statistics			Ginásio do Maracanãzinho, Rio de Janeiro; Attendance: 6,832; Referees: Taoufik Boudaya (TUN), Kang Joo-hee (KOR)

6 August 2016; 22:35	Serbia	3–0	Italy	Ginásio do Maracanãzinho, Rio de Janeiro; Attendance: 4,373; Referees: Piotr Dudek (POL), Arturo Di Giacomo (BEL)
6 August 2016; 22:35	(27–25, 25–20, 25–23); Result Statistics			Ginásio do Maracanãzinho, Rio de Janeiro; Attendance: 4,373; Referees: Piotr Dudek (POL), Arturo Di Giacomo (BEL)

8 August 2016; 09:30	China	3–0	Italy	Ginásio do Maracanãzinho, Rio de Janeiro; Attendance: 4,804; Referees: Patricia Rolf (USA), Paulo Turci (BRA)
8 August 2016; 09:30	(25–21, 25–21, 25–16); Result Statistics			Ginásio do Maracanãzinho, Rio de Janeiro; Attendance: 4,804; Referees: Patricia Rolf (USA), Paulo Turci (BRA)

8 August 2016; 15:00	United States	3–2	Netherlands	Ginásio do Maracanãzinho, Rio de Janeiro; Attendance: 5,455; Referees: Mohammad Shahmiri (IRI), Juraj Mokrý (SVK)
8 August 2016; 15:00	(18–25, 25–18, 21–25, 25–20, 15–8); Result Statistics			Ginásio do Maracanãzinho, Rio de Janeiro; Attendance: 5,455; Referees: Mohammad Shahmiri (IRI), Juraj Mokrý (SVK)

8 August 2016; 17:05	Serbia	3–0	Puerto Rico	Ginásio do Maracanãzinho, Rio de Janeiro; Attendance: 5,730; Referees: Kang Joo-hee (KOR), Andrey Zenovich (RUS)
8 August 2016; 17:05	(29–27, 25–18, 25–20); Result Statistics			Ginásio do Maracanãzinho, Rio de Janeiro; Attendance: 5,730; Referees: Kang Joo-hee (KOR), Andrey Zenovich (RUS)

10 August 2016; 09:30	China	3–0	Puerto Rico	Ginásio do Maracanãzinho, Rio de Janeiro; Attendance: 4,386; Referees: Heike Kraft (GER), Kang Joo-hee (KOR)
10 August 2016; 09:30	(25–20, 25–17, 25–18); Result Statistics			Ginásio do Maracanãzinho, Rio de Janeiro; Attendance: 4,386; Referees: Heike Kraft (GER), Kang Joo-hee (KOR)

10 August 2016; 11:35	Italy	0–3	Netherlands	Ginásio do Maracanãzinho, Rio de Janeiro; Attendance: 5,539; Referees: Juraj Mokrý (SVK), Nasr Shaaban (EGY)
10 August 2016; 11:35	(21–25, 20–25, 20–25); Result Statistics			Ginásio do Maracanãzinho, Rio de Janeiro; Attendance: 5,539; Referees: Juraj Mokrý (SVK), Nasr Shaaban (EGY)

10 August 2016; 15:00	United States	3–1	Serbia	Ginásio do Maracanãzinho, Rio de Janeiro; Attendance: 7,134; Referees: Hernán Casamiquela (ARG), Rogerio Espicalsky (BRA)
10 August 2016; 15:00	(25–17, 21–25, 25–18, 25–19); Result Statistics			Ginásio do Maracanãzinho, Rio de Janeiro; Attendance: 7,134; Referees: Hernán Casamiquela (ARG), Rogerio Espicalsky (BRA)

12 August 2016; 09:30	China	0–3	Serbia	Ginásio do Maracanãzinho, Rio de Janeiro; Attendance: 3,509; Referees: Kang Joo-hee (KOR), Susana Rodríguez (ESP)
12 August 2016; 09:30	(19–25, 19–25, 22–25); Result Statistics			Ginásio do Maracanãzinho, Rio de Janeiro; Attendance: 3,509; Referees: Kang Joo-hee (KOR), Susana Rodríguez (ESP)

12 August 2016; 15:00	United States	3–1	Italy	Ginásio do Maracanãzinho, Rio de Janeiro; Attendance: 7,243; Referees: Rogerio Espicalsky (BRA), Denny Cespedes (DOM)
12 August 2016; 15:00	(25–22, 25–22, 23–25, 25–20); Result Statistics			Ginásio do Maracanãzinho, Rio de Janeiro; Attendance: 7,243; Referees: Rogerio Espicalsky (BRA), Denny Cespedes (DOM)

12 August 2016; 17:05	Netherlands	3–0	Puerto Rico	Ginásio do Maracanãzinho, Rio de Janeiro; Attendance: 6,742; Referees: Ibrahim Al-Naama (QAT), Hernán Casamiquela (ARG)
12 August 2016; 17:05	(25–14, 25–22, 25–16); Result Statistics			Ginásio do Maracanãzinho, Rio de Janeiro; Attendance: 6,742; Referees: Ibrahim Al-Naama (QAT), Hernán Casamiquela (ARG)

14 August 2016; 09:30	Serbia	2–3	Netherlands	Ginásio do Maracanãzinho, Rio de Janeiro; Attendance: 6,387; Referees: Susana Rodríguez (ESP), Andrey Zenovich (RUS)
14 August 2016; 09:30	(22–25, 20–25, 25–22, 25–18, 8–15); Result Statistics			Ginásio do Maracanãzinho, Rio de Janeiro; Attendance: 6,387; Referees: Susana Rodríguez (ESP), Andrey Zenovich (RUS)

14 August 2016; 15:00	Italy	3–0	Puerto Rico	Ginásio do Maracanãzinho, Rio de Janeiro; Attendance: 7,225; Referees: Kang Joo-hee (KOR), Patricia Rolf (USA)
14 August 2016; 15:00	(25–14, 25–13, 25–22); Result Statistics			Ginásio do Maracanãzinho, Rio de Janeiro; Attendance: 7,225; Referees: Kang Joo-hee (KOR), Patricia Rolf (USA)

14 August 2016; 17:05	United States	3–1	China	Ginásio do Maracanãzinho, Rio de Janeiro; Attendance: 6,897; Referees: Heike Kraft (GER), Juraj Mokrý (SVK)
14 August 2016; 17:05	(22–25, 25–17, 25–19, 25–19); Result Statistics			Ginásio do Maracanãzinho, Rio de Janeiro; Attendance: 6,897; Referees: Heike Kraft (GER), Juraj Mokrý (SVK)

== Knockout stage ==
All times are Brasília Time (UTC−03:00).

The first ranked teams of both pools played against the fourth ranked teams of the other pool. The second ranked teams faced the second or third ranked teams of the other pool, determined by drawing of lots. The drawing of lots was held after the last match in the preliminary round.

=== Bracket ===
Quarter-finals
16 August
Brazil	2
China	3
16 August
South Korea	1
Netherlands	3
16 August
Russia	0
Serbia	3
16 August
Japan	0
United States	3

Semi-finals
18 August
China	3
Netherlands	1
18 August
Serbia	3
United States	2

Gold medal match
20 August
China	3
Serbia	1
Bronze medal match
20 August
Netherlands	1
United States	3

=== Quarter-finals ===
16 August 2016; 10:00	South Korea	1–3	Netherlands	Ginásio do Maracanãzinho, Rio de Janeiro; Attendance: 6,351; Referees: Patricia Rolf (USA), Nasr Shaaban (EGY)
16 August 2016; 10:00	(19–25, 14–25, 25–23, 20–25); Result Statistics			Ginásio do Maracanãzinho, Rio de Janeiro; Attendance: 6,351; Referees: Patricia Rolf (USA), Nasr Shaaban (EGY)

16 August 2016; 14:00	Japan	0–3	United States	Ginásio do Maracanãzinho, Rio de Janeiro; Attendance: 7,226; Referees: Paulo Turci (BRA), Heike Kraft (GER)
16 August 2016; 14:00	(16–25, 23–25, 22–25); Result Statistics			Ginásio do Maracanãzinho, Rio de Janeiro; Attendance: 7,226; Referees: Paulo Turci (BRA), Heike Kraft (GER)

16 August 2016; 18:00	Russia	0–3	Serbia	Ginásio do Maracanãzinho, Rio de Janeiro; Attendance: 7,121; Referees: Susana Rodríguez (ESP), Hernán Casamiquela (ARG)
16 August 2016; 18:00	(9–25, 22–25, 21–25); Result Statistics			Ginásio do Maracanãzinho, Rio de Janeiro; Attendance: 7,121; Referees: Susana Rodríguez (ESP), Hernán Casamiquela (ARG)

16 August 2016; 22:15	Brazil	2–3	China	Ginásio do Maracanãzinho, Rio de Janeiro; Attendance: 9,498; Referees: Piotr Dudek (POL), Vladimir Simonović (SRB)
16 August 2016; 22:15	(25–15, 23–25, 22–25, 25–22, 13–15); Result Statistics			Ginásio do Maracanãzinho, Rio de Janeiro; Attendance: 9,498; Referees: Piotr Dudek (POL), Vladimir Simonović (SRB)

=== Semi-finals ===
18 August 2016; 13:00	Serbia	3–2	United States	Ginásio do Maracanãzinho, Rio de Janeiro; Attendance: 5,837; Referees: Andrey Zenovich (RUS), Nasr Shaaban (EGY)
18 August 2016; 13:00	(20–25, 25–17, 25–21, 16–25, 15–13); Result Statistics			Ginásio do Maracanãzinho, Rio de Janeiro; Attendance: 5,837; Referees: Andrey Zenovich (RUS), Nasr Shaaban (EGY)

18 August 2016; 22:15	China	3–1	Netherlands	Ginásio do Maracanãzinho, Rio de Janeiro; Attendance: 8,411; Referees: Luis Macias (MEX), Fabrizio Pasquali (ITA)
18 August 2016; 22:15	(27–25, 23–25, 29–27, 25–23); Result Statistics			Ginásio do Maracanãzinho, Rio de Janeiro; Attendance: 8,411; Referees: Luis Macias (MEX), Fabrizio Pasquali (ITA)

=== Bronze medal match ===
20 August 2016; 13:00	Netherlands	1–3	United States	Ginásio do Maracanãzinho, Rio de Janeiro; Attendance: 7,897; Referees: Paulo Turci (BRA), Piotr Dudek (POL)
20 August 2016; 13:00	(23–25, 27–25, 22–25, 19–25); Result Statistics			Ginásio do Maracanãzinho, Rio de Janeiro; Attendance: 7,897; Referees: Paulo Turci (BRA), Piotr Dudek (POL)

=== Gold medal match ===
20 August 2016; 22:15	China	3–1	Serbia	Ginásio do Maracanãzinho, Rio de Janeiro; Attendance: 8,773; Referees: Susana Rodríguez (ESP), Patricia Rolf (USA)
20 August 2016; 22:15	(19–25, 25–17, 25–22, 25–23); Result Statistics			Ginásio do Maracanãzinho, Rio de Janeiro; Attendance: 8,773; Referees: Susana Rodríguez (ESP), Patricia Rolf (USA)

== Statistics leaders ==
- Only players whose teams advanced to the semifinals are ranked.

Best scorers

Rank	Name	Points
1	(China) Zhu Ting	179
2	(Netherlands) Lonneke Slöetjes	157
3	(Serbia) Tijana Bošković	137
4	(Serbia) Brankica Mihajlović	121
5	(Netherlands) Anne Buijs	104
5	(United States) Foluke Akinradewo	104

Best spikers

Rank	Name	%Eff
1	(China) Zhu Ting	42.27
2	(Serbia) Brankica Mihajlović	31.60
3	(Netherlands) Lonneke Slöetjes	28.57
3	(United States) Jordan Larson	28.57
5	(United States) Kimberly Hill	28.00

Best blockers

Rank	Name	Avg
1	(Serbia) Milena Rašić	0.83
2	(Netherlands) Robin de Kruijf	0.76
3	(United States) Foluke Akinradewo	0.56
3	(United States) Rachael Adams	0.56
5	(China) Zhu Ting	0.48

Best servers

Rank	Name	Avg
1	(Serbia) Milena Rašić	0.57
2	(Serbia) Tijana Bošković	0.33
3	(Netherlands) Anne Buijs	0.30
4	(China) Hui Ruoqi	0.29
5	(United States) Jordan Larson	0.26

Best diggers

Rank	Name	Avg
1	(Netherlands) Debby Stam	2.30
2	(China) Lin Li	1.90
3	(Serbia) Silvija Popović	1.80
4	(United States) Kayla Banwarth	1.75
5	(United States) Jordan Larson	1.56

Best setters

Rank	Name	Avg
1	(United States) Alisha Glass	10.47
2	(Netherlands) Laura Dijkema	10.36
3	(Serbia) Maja Ognjenović	9.03
4	(China) Ding Xia	5.52
5	(China) Wei Qiuyue	4.74

Best receivers

Rank	Name	%Succ
1	(Serbia) Silvija Popović	45.32
2	(United States) Jordan Larson	44.05
3	(United States) Kayla Banwarth	41.72
4	(China) Zhu Ting	39.16
5	(China) Lin Li	35.06

Source: FIVB.org

== Final standing ==
Rank	Team
1st place, gold medalist(s)	China
2nd place, silver medalist(s)	Serbia
3rd place, bronze medalist(s)	United States
4	Netherlands
5	Brazil
5	Japan
5	South Korea
5	Russia
9	Argentina
9	Italy
11	Cameroon
11	Puerto Rico

2016 Women's Olympic champions

China
3rd title

12–woman roster
Yuan Xinyue, Zhu Ting, Yang Fangxu, Gong Xiangyu, Wei Qiuyue, Zhang Changning, Liu Xiaotong, Xu Yunli, Hui Ruoqi (c), Lin Li (L), Ding Xia, Yan Ni
Head coach
Lang Ping

== Medalists ==
Gold	Silver	Bronze
China Yuan Xinyue; Zhu Ting; Yang Fangxu; Gong Xiangyu; Wei Qiuyue; Zhang Changning; Liu Xiaotong; Xu Yunli; Hui Ruoqi (c); Lin Li (L); Ding Xia; Yan Ni Head coach: Lang Ping	Serbia Bianka Buša; Jovana Brakočević; Bojana Živković; Tijana Malešević; Brankica Mihajlović; Maja Ognjenović (c); Stefana Veljković Jelena Nikolić; Jovana Stevanović; Milena Rašić; Silvija Popović (L); Tijana Bošković Head coach: Zoran Terzić	United States Alisha Glass; Kayla Banwarth (L); Courtney Thompson; Rachael Adams; Carli Lloyd; Jordan Larson-Burbach; Kelly Murphy; Christa Harmotto-Dietzen (c); Kimberly Hill; Foluke Akinradewo; Kelsey Robinson; Karsta Lowe Head coach: Karch Kiraly

== Awards ==
- Most valuable player
  (China) Zhu Ting
- Best setter
  (United States) Alisha Glass
- Best outside spikers
  (China) Zhu Ting
  (Serbia) Brankica Mihajlović
- Best middle blockers
  (Serbia) Milena Rašić
  (United States) Foluke Akinradewo
- Best opposite spiker
  (Netherlands) Lonneke Slöetjes
- Best libero
  (China) Lin Li

== See also ==
- Volleyball at the 2016 Summer Olympics – Men's tournament
- Leap (Movie)
