= Ryma Mebarki =

Algerian volleyball player (born 1994)

Personal information
- Nationality: Algerian
- Born: 28 January 1994 (age 32)
- Height: 166 cm (65 in)
- Weight: 63 kg (139 lb)
- Spike: 260 cm (102 in)
- Block: 245 cm (96 in)

Volleyball information
- Number: 13 (national team)

Career
Years	Teams
2015	MBB

National team
2015	Algeria

Ryma Mebarki (born 28 January 1994) is an Algerian female volleyball player. She was part of the Algeria women's national volleyball team.

She participated in the 2015 FIVB Volleyball World Grand Prix. On club level she played for MBB in 2015.
