= Haruka Miyashita =

Japanese volleyball player

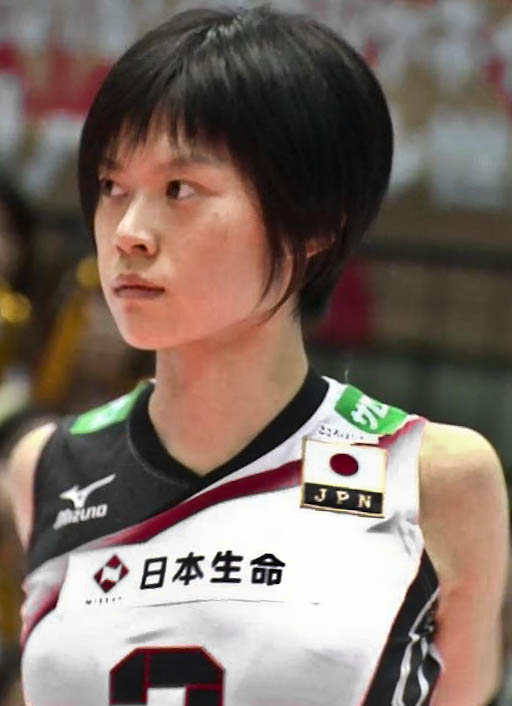
- Haruka Miyashita

Personal information
- Full name: Haruka Miyashita
- Nickname: Haruka
- Born: September 1, 1994 (age 32); Kuwana, Mie, Japan
- Height: 1.77 m (5 ft 10 in)
- Weight: 58 kg (128 lb)
- Spike: 307 cm (121 in)
- Block: 301 cm (119 in)

Volleyball information
- Position: Setter
- Current club: Okayama Seagulls
- Number: 14

National team
Japan 2010-2021

Haruka Miyashita (宮下 遥, Miyashita Haruka; born September 1, 1994) is a Japanese volleyball player who plays for the Okayama Seagulls. She also plays for the All-Japan women's volleyball team.

== Career ==
Miyashita was once a wing-spiker, but was converted to setter by Akiyoshi Kawamoto, who was on the senior staff of Osaka International Ōwada Junior High and the head coach of the Okayama Seagulls.

In September 2009, while still attending Ōwada Junior High, Miyashita registered with the Okayama Seagulls. On 28 November 2009 Miyashita debuted in a V.Premier League match at the age of 15 years and two months. That is the record for the youngest debut in the V.Premier League. In the match Miyashita collided with a teammate, and broke two front teeth.

In September 2010 Miyashita was nominated for the All-Japan women's volleyball team, and made her national team debut at the 2010 Asian Women's Cup Volleyball Championship held in Taicang.

In August 2013 Miyashita competed in the 2013 FIVB World Grand Prix as a member of senior national team and in 2016 she played at the 2016 Summer Olympics in Rio de Janeiro.

== Clubs ==
- Osaka International Ōwada Junior High
- (Japan) Okayama Seagulls (2009-2023)

== Awards ==
=== Individual ===
- 2010 Kurowashiki All Japan Volleyball Tournament - New face Award
- 2014 2013-14 V.Premier League - Excellent Player Award, Best 6
- 2016 World Olympic qualification tournament "Best Setter"

=== Team ===
- 2012-13 V.Premier League - Bronze Medal with Okayama Seagulls
- 2013 Empress's Cup - Runner-up with Okayama Seagulls
- 2013-14 V.Premier League - Runner-up with Okayama Seagulls

=== National team ===
- 2013 Asian Championship - Silver medal
- 2014 FIVB World Grand Prix - Silver medal
