= Lin Li (engineer) =

Professor of laser engineering

Lin Li (born June, 1959), FREng, CEng, FIET, FLIA, FCIRP (Chinese: 李林; pinyin: Lǐ Lín), is a professor of laser engineering at the University of Manchester.

== Early life ==
Lin earned his BSc in control engineering from Dalian University of Technology in 1982 and his PhD in laser engineering from Imperial College, London in 1989.

== Career ==
Lin worked as a postdoctoral research associate in high power laser engineering at the University of Liverpool from 1988 to 1994. He joined UMIST in 1994, where he established the first high-power laser processing research laboratory and its associated research group. He became a full professor in 2000. He co-invented and developed microsphere-based super-resolution optical technology capable of achieving 50 nm resolution and he has 47 patents in the field of laser processing and photonic science. His current research relates to the use of graphene in welding.

He is a fellow of the Royal Academy of Engineering, the Institute of Engineering and Technology, the Laser Institute of America, the International Academy for Production Engineering, and a Chartered Engineer.

In 2017 it was announced that the LIG Nanowise, a spin-off company from the University of Manchester chaired by Li, had invented new microscopy techniques that can quadruple the resolution of optical microscopes.

== Awards ==
His awards include:

- Arthur Charles Main Award from the Institute of Mechanical Engineers in 2001 for work in laser based nuclear decommissioning technology
- Sir Frank Whittle Medal from the Royal Academy of Engineering in 2013 for achievements in engineering innovations in manufacturing
- Wolfson Research Merit Award of the Royal Society for his research into laser nano-fabrication and nano-imaging, 2014.
- Researcher of the Year in Engineering and Physical Sciences at The University of Manchester in 2014.
