= Lin Li (volleyball) =

Chinese volleyball player

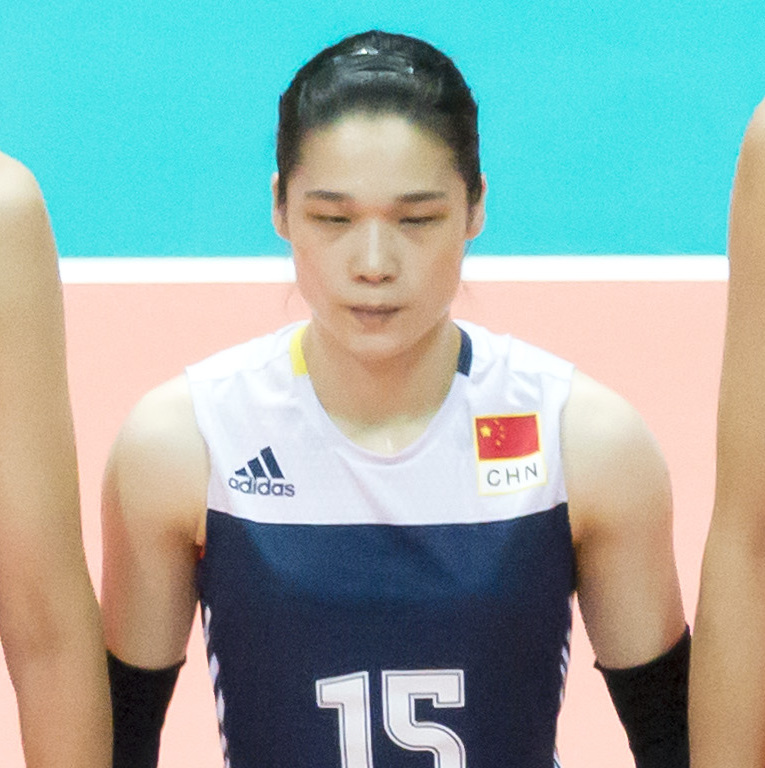
- 2017

Personal information
- Nationality: Chinese
- Born: 15 July 1992 (age 34); Fuqing, Fuzhou, China
- Height: 1.71 m (5 ft 7 in)
- Weight: 70 kg (154 lb)
- Spike: 294 cm (116 in)
- Block: 294 cm (116 in)

Career
Years	Teams
2013–2019	Fujian
2019–2022	Guangdong

National team
2015–2022	China
Honours
Volleyball
Olympic Games
Gold medal – first place	2016 Rio de Janeiro	Team
World Championship
Bronze medal – third place	2018 Japan	Team
FIVB World Cup
Gold medal – first place	2015 Japan	Team
Gold medal – first place	2019 Japan	Team
World Grand Champions Cup
Gold medal – first place	2017 Japan	Team
Volleyball Nations League
Bronze medal – third place	2018 Nanjing	Team
Bronze medal – third place	2019 Nanjing	Team
Asian Games
Gold medal – first place	2018 Jakarta-Palembang
Asian Championship
Gold medal – first place	2015 Tianjin
Montreux Volley Masters
Bronze medal – third place	2017 Switzerland	Team

Lin Li (Chinese: 林莉; pinyin: lín lì; born 15 July 1992) is a Chinese volleyball player. She was part of the China women's national volleyball team that won the gold medal at the 2016 Summer Olympics. At club level, she has played for Fujian Xi Meng Bao. Lin won the 2016 World Grand Prix Best Libero award. In October 2022, Lin Li announced her retirement.

Awards
Preceded by (Russia) Anna Malova	Best Libero of FIVB World Grand Prix; 2016	Succeeded by (Italy) Monica De Gennaro
Preceded by (Dominican Republic) Brenda Castillo	Best Libero of Summer Olympics; 2016	Succeeded by (United States) Justine Wong-Orantes
