= Kuribayashi =

Kuribayashi (written: 栗林, lit. "chestnut-forest") is a Japanese surname. Notable people with the surname include:

- Ema Kuribayashi (born 1983), cricketer
- Kiue Kuribayashi (栗林 喜右衛, born 1934), Japanese racewalker
- Minami Kuribayashi (born 1976), singer-songwriter
- Miwa Kuribayashi (栗林 未和, born 1998), Japanese women's basketball player
- Satoshi Kuribayashi (栗林 慧 born 1939), photographer
- Tadamichi Kuribayashi (栗林 忠道, 1891–1945), general in the Imperial Japanese Army

== See also ==
- Kurabayashi
- Ritsurin Garden (栗林公園, Ritsurin Kōen, lit. chestnut grove garden) one of the most famous historical gardens in Japan
