= Ritsurin =

Ritsurin may refer to several places in Takamatsu, Japan:

- Ritsurin Garden
- Ritsurin Station
- Ritsurin-Kōen Station
- Ritsurin-Kōen-Kitaguchi Station
