= 2015 Women's NORCECA Volleyball Championship =

2015 Women's NORCECA Championship

Tournament details
- Host country: Mexico
- Dates: 27 September–2 October
- Teams: 8
- Venue: 1 (in 1 host city)

Final positions
- Champions: United States (8th title)

Tournament awards
- MVP: (United States) Nicole Fawcett

The 2015 Women's NORCECA Volleyball Championship was the 24th edition of the tournament, played from 27 September to 2 October 2015 in Michoacan, Mexico.

The United States won eighth titles, after defeated 3–1 to the Dominican Republic to win the Continental Championship and both qualified, along with Puerto Rico and Canada to the NORCECA Olympic Qualifier. Nicole Fawcett of the United States earned the Most Valuable Player award.

== Competing nations ==
The following national teams have qualified:

Pool A	Pool B
United States	Mexico
Cuba	Dominican Republic
Canada	Puerto Rico
Costa Rica	Trinidad and Tobago

== Pool standing procedure ==
1. Number of matches won
2. Match points
3. Points ratio
4. Sets ratio
5. Result of the last match between the tied teams

Match won 3–0: 5 match points for the winner, 0 match points for the loser
Match won 3–1: 4 match points for the winner, 1 match point for the loser
Match won 3–2: 3 match points for the winner, 2 match points for the loser

== Preliminary round ==
=== Pool A ===
Pos	Team	Pld	W	L	Pts	SPW	SPL	SPR	SW	SL	SR	Qualification
1	United States	3	3	0	15	230	152	1.513	9	0	MAX	Semifinals
2	Canada	3	2	1	8	231	216	1.069	6	5	1.200	Quarterfinals
3	Cuba	3	1	2	7	241	235	1.026	5	6	0.833	Quarterfinals
4	Costa Rica	3	0	3	0	126	225	0.560	0	9	0.000	5th – 8th classification

Date	Time		Score		Set 1	Set 2	Set 3	Set 4	Set 5	Total	Report
27 Sep	13:00	Costa Rica	0–3	United States	15–25	11–25	13–25			39–75	P2 P3
27 Sep	17:00	Cuba	2–3	Canada	22–25	25–18	25–22	20–25	12–15	104–105	P2 P3
28 Sep	14:00	Cuba	3–0	Costa Rica	25–14	25–15	25–21			75–50	P2 P3
28 Sep	18:00	United States	3–0	Canada	25–15	25–17	25–19			75–51	P2 P3
29 Sep	14:00	Canada	3–0	Costa Rica	25–15	25–12	25–10			75–37	P2 P3
29 Sep	18:00	United States	3–0	Cuba	25–16	25–18	30–28			80–62	P2 P3

=== Pool B ===
Pos	Team	Pld	W	L	Pts	SPW	SPL	SPR	SW	SL	SR	Qualification
1	Dominican Republic	3	3	0	13	253	205	1.234	9	2	4.500	Semifinals
2	Puerto Rico	3	2	1	10	282	249	1.133	8	5	1.600	Quarterfinals
3	Mexico	3	1	2	7	229	232	0.987	5	6	0.833	Quarterfinals
4	Trinidad and Tobago	3	0	3	0	147	225	0.653	0	9	0.000	5th – 8th classification

Date	Time		Score		Set 1	Set 2	Set 3	Set 4	Set 5	Total	Report
27 Sep	15:00	Dominican Republic	3–2	Puerto Rico	25–19	25–19	18–25	20–25	15–13	103–101	P2 P3
27 Sep	20:00	Mexico	3–0	Trinidad and Tobago	25–16	25–12	25–23			75–51	P2 P3
28 Sep	16:00	Trinidad and Tobago	0–3	Dominican Republic	16–25	14–25	17–25			47–75	P2 P3
28 Sep	20:00	Mexico	2–3	Puerto Rico	20–25	25–23	16–25	25–18	11–15	97–106	P2 P3
29 Sep	16:00	Puerto Rico	3–0	Trinidad and Tobago	25–14	25–14	25–21			75–49	P2 P3
29 Sep	20:00	Mexico	0–3	Dominican Republic	16–25	18–25	23–25			57–75	P2 P3

== Final round ==
Quarterfinals
30 September
Puerto Rico	3
Cuba	1
30 September
Canada	3
Mexico	2

Semifinals
1 October
United States	3
Puerto Rico	0
1 October
Dominican Republic	3
Canada	1

Final
2 October
United States	3
Dominican Republic	1
3rd place
2 October
Puerto Rico	3
Canada	1

5th–8th semifinals
1 October
Costa Rica	0
Mexico	3
1 October
Trinidad and Tobago	0
Cuba	3

5th place
2 October
Mexico	1
Cuba	3
7th place
2 October
Costa Rica	0
Trinidad and Tobago	3

=== Quarterfinals ===
Date	Time		Score		Set 1	Set 2	Set 3	Set 4	Set 5	Total	Report
30 Sep	18:00	Puerto Rico	3–1	Cuba	25–20	25–14	25–27	25–18		100–79	P2 P3
30 Sep	20:00	Canada	3–2	Mexico	22–25	25–15	25–17	21–25	15–8	108–90	P2 P3

=== Classification 5th–8th places ===
Date	Time		Score		Set 1	Set 2	Set 3	Set 4	Set 5	Total	Report
1 Oct	14:00	Costa Rica	0–3	Mexico	16–25	18–25	13–25			47–75	P2 P3
1 Oct	16:00	Trinidad and Tobago	0–3	Cuba	14–25	14–25	14–25			42–75	P2 P3

=== Semifinals ===
Date	Time		Score		Set 1	Set 2	Set 3	Set 4	Set 5	Total	Report
1 Oct	18:00	Dominican Republic	3–1	Canada	18–25	25–20	25–23	25–20		93–88	P2 P3
1 Oct	20:00	United States	3–0	Puerto Rico	25–20	25–18	25–17			75–55	P2 P3

=== Seventh place match ===
Date	Time		Score		Set 1	Set 2	Set 3	Set 4	Set 5	Total	Report
2 Oct	14:00	Costa Rica	0–3	Trinidad and Tobago	19–25	24–26	24–26			67–77	P2 P3

=== Fifth place match ===
Date	Time		Score		Set 1	Set 2	Set 3	Set 4	Set 5	Total	Report
2 Oct	16:00	Mexico	1–3	Cuba	25–18	15–25	15–25	19–25		74–93	P2 P3

=== Bronze medal match ===
Date	Time		Score		Set 1	Set 2	Set 3	Set 4	Set 5	Total	Report
2 Oct	18:00	Canada	1–3	Puerto Rico	25–23	19–25	20–25	17–25		81–98	P2 P3

=== Final ===
Date	Time		Score		Set 1	Set 2	Set 3	Set 4	Set 5	Total	Report
2 Oct	20:00	Dominican Republic	1–3	United States	19–25	25–22	18–25	17–25		79–97	P2 P3

== Final standing ==
Rank	Team
1st place, gold medalist(s)	United States
2nd place, silver medalist(s)	Dominican Republic
3rd place, bronze medalist(s)	Puerto Rico
4	Canada
5	Cuba
6	Mexico
7	Trinidad and Tobago
8	Costa Rica

Qualified for the NORCECA Olympic Qualifier

2015 Women's NORCECA champions

United States
8th title

== All-Star team ==
- Most valuable player
  - Nicole Fawcett (USA)
- Best Outside Hitters
  - Andrea Rangel (MEX)
  - Yonkaira Peña (DOM)
- Best Middle Blockers
  - Lucille Charuk (CAN)
  - Lynda Morales (PUR)
- Best setter
  - Niverka Marte (DOM)
- Best Opposite
  - Heidy Rodríguez (CUB)
- Best scorer
  - Andrea Rangel (MEX)
- Best server
  - Evelyn Sibaja (CRC)
- Best libero
  - Brenda Castillo (DOM)
- Best digger
  - Brenda Castillo (DOM)
- Best receiver
  - Kayla Banwarth (USA)
