= Volleyball at the 2016 Summer Olympics – Women's qualification =

The qualification for the 2016 Women's Olympic volleyball tournament was held from 22 August 2015 to 22 May 2016. Twelve teams qualified, the hosts, the FIVB World Cup champion and runner-up, five continental Olympic qualification tournament champions, and four teams from the World Olympic qualification tournament respectively. Teams already qualified for the event were not eligible to play in the following qualification tournaments.

== Qualification summary ==
Means of qualification	Date	Venue	Vacancies	Qualified
Host country	—N/a	—N/a	1	Brazil
2015 World Cup	22 August – 6 September 2015	Japan	2	China
2015 World Cup	22 August – 6 September 2015	Japan	2	Serbia
European Qualifier	4–9 January 2016	(Turkey) Ankara	1	Russia
South American Qualifier	6–10 January 2016	(Argentina) Bariloche	1	Argentina
North American Qualifier	7–9 January 2016	(United States) Lincoln	1	United States
African Qualifier	12–16 February 2016	(Cameroon) Yaoundé	1	Cameroon
Asian Qualifier	14–22 May 2016	(Japan) Tokyo	1	South Korea
1st World Qualifier	14–22 May 2016	(Japan) Tokyo	3	Italy
1st World Qualifier	14–22 May 2016	(Japan) Tokyo	3	Netherlands
1st World Qualifier	14–22 May 2016	(Japan) Tokyo	3	Japan
2nd World Qualifier	20–22 May 2016	(Puerto Rico) San Juan	1	Puerto Rico
Total			12	

== Means of qualification ==
Qualified for the 2016 Summer Olympics
Qualified for the 2016 World Olympics Qualification Tournament

== Pool standing procedure ==
For all qualification tournaments

1. Number of matches won
2. Match points
3. Sets ratio
4. Points ratio
5. Result of the last match between the tied teams

Match won 3–0 or 3–1: 3 match points for the winner, 0 match points for the loser
Match won 3–2: 2 match points for the winner, 1 match point for the loser

For North American qualification tournament only

1. Number of matches won
2. Match points
3. Points ratio
4. Sets ratio
5. Result of the last match between the tied teams

Match won 3–0: 5 match points for the winner, 0 match points for the loser
Match won 3–1: 4 match points for the winner, 1 match point for the loser
Match won 3–2: 3 match points for the winner, 2 match points for the loser

== Host country ==
FIVB reserved a vacancy for the Olympics host country to participate in the tournament.

- Brazil

== FIVB World cup ==
The winners and runners-up from 2015 FIVB Volleyball World Cup qualified for the Olympics.

- Venue: Japan
- Dates: 22 August – 6 September 2015

Rank	Team
1st place, gold medalist(s)	China
2nd place, silver medalist(s)	Serbia
3rd place, bronze medalist(s)	United States
4	Russia
5	Japan
6	South Korea
7	Dominican Republic
8	Argentina
9	Cuba
10	Kenya
11	Peru
12	Algeria

== Continental qualification tournaments ==
=== Africa ===
African Olympic Qualification Tournament
The winners qualified for the 2016 Olympic Games. The second and third teams would play in World Olympic Qualification Tournament.

- Venue: Yaoundé Multipurpose Sports Complex, Yaoundé, Cameroon
- Dates: 12–16 February 2016

Rank	Team
1	Cameroon
2	Egypt
3	Kenya
4	Algeria
5	Botswana
6	Tunisia
7	Uganda

=== Asia and Oceania ===
Asian Olympic Qualification Tournament
The Asian Olympic qualification tournament combined with World Olympic qualification tournaments. The host teams and the top three ranked teams from the World ranking as of 1 January 2016 competed in the tournament. The top ranked among the four teams qualified as Asian Olympic Qualification Tournament winners.

=== Europe ===
European Olympic Qualification Tournament
The winners qualified for the 2016 Olympic Games. The second and third teams would play in World Olympic Qualification Tournament.

- Venue: Başkent Volleyball Hall, Ankara, Turkey
- Dates: 4–9 January 2016

Rank	Team
1	Russia
2	Netherlands
3	Italy
4	Turkey
5	Germany
6	Belgium
7	Poland
8	Croatia

=== North America ===
NORCECA Olympic Qualification Tournament
The top four ranked teams from the 2015 NORCECA Volleyball Championship competed in this tournament. The winners qualified for the 2016 Olympic Games. The second and third teams would play in the World Olympic Qualification Tournament.

- Venue: Pinnacle Bank Arena, Lincoln, Nebraska, United States
- Dates: 7–9 January 2016
- All times are Central Time (UTC−06:00).

Pos	Team	Pld	W	L	Pts	SPW	SPL	SPR	SW	SL	SR
1	United States	3	3	0	14	249	173	1.439	9	1	9.000
2	Dominican Republic	3	2	1	8	249	246	1.012	6	5	1.200
3	Puerto Rico	3	1	2	7	232	258	0.899	5	6	0.833
4	Canada	3	0	3	1	205	258	0.795	1	9	0.111

Date	Time		Score		Set 1	Set 2	Set 3	Set 4	Set 5	Total	Report
7 Jan	17:00	Dominican Republic	3–1	Puerto Rico	17–25	25–13	25–23	25–23		92–84	P2 P3
7 Jan	19:00	United States	3–0	Canada	25–18	25–18	25–15			75–51	P2 P3
8 Jan	17:00	Canada	1–3	Dominican Republic	27–25	16–25	24–26	20–25		87–101	P2 P3
8 Jan	19:00	United States	3–1	Puerto Rico	25–14	24–26	25–12	25–14		99–66	P2 P3
9 Jan	17:00	Puerto Rico	3–0	Canada	32–30	25–17	25–20			82–67	P2 P3
9 Jan	20:00	United States	3–0	Dominican Republic	25–19	25–19	25–18			75–56	P2 P3

=== South America ===
South American Olympic Qualification Tournament
The winners qualified for the 2016 Olympic Games. The second and third teams would play in World Olympic Qualification Tournament.

- Venue: Bomberos Voluntarios Stadium, Bariloche, Argentina
- Dates: 6–10 January 2016
- All times are Argentina Standard Time (UTC−03:00).

Pos	Team	Pld	W	L	Pts	SW	SL	SR	SPW	SPL	SPR
1	Argentina	4	4	0	12	12	1	12.000	318	231	1.377
2	Peru	4	3	1	9	9	3	3.000	284	247	1.150
3	Colombia	4	2	2	5	6	9	0.667	332	329	1.009
4	Venezuela	4	1	3	4	6	9	0.667	315	314	1.003
5	Chile	4	0	4	0	1	12	0.083	193	321	0.601

Date	Time		Score		Set 1	Set 2	Set 3	Set 4	Set 5	Total	Report
6 Jan	15:00	Colombia	3–2	Venezuela	25–14	15–25	21–25	25–17	17–15	103–96	Result
6 Jan	19:00	Chile	0–3	Argentina	10–25	15–25	14–25			39–75	Result
7 Jan	16:00	Chile	0–3	Peru	10–25	13–25	10–25			33–75	Result
7 Jan	19:00	Venezuela	1–3	Argentina	18–25	16–25	25–17	18–25		77–92	Result
8 Jan	16:00	Venezuela	3–0	Chile	25–22	25–13	25–9			75–44	Result
8 Jan	19:00	Peru	3–0	Colombia	30–28	25–22	25–22			80–72	Result
9 Jan	14:00	Peru	3–0	Venezuela	25–23	25–22	25–22			75–67	Result
9 Jan	17:00	Argentina	3–0	Colombia	25–20	26–24	25–17			76–61	Result
10 Jan	14:00	Colombia	3–1	Chile	25–17	21–25	25–19	25–16		96–77	Result
10 Jan	17:00	Argentina	3–0	Peru	25–20	25–20	25–14			75–54	Result

== World Qualification tournaments ==
There were 2 tournaments to get 5 remaining spots in the 2016 Olympic Games. Only the teams which had not yet qualified from the 3 events above could play in the tournament. 12 teams had rights to play in this tournament, Japan as a host of 1st tournament, the top three Asian teams from World ranking as of 1 January 2016, and the 2nd and 3rd place from continental qualification tournaments. The 1st tournament was combined with the Asian Olympic qualification tournament which played in Japan. The best ranked Asian team qualified for the 2016 Olympic Games. The best three ranked teams, excluding the best Asian team, also secured the vacancies in the 2016 Olympic Games. The 2nd tournament which was held in Puerto Rico consisted of 4 teams, and only the best ranked team could take the last spot for the 2016 Olympic Games. The table below showed the allocation of 12 qualified teams.

1st tournament				2nd tournament	
Qualification	Qualifier	Qualification	Qualifier	Qualification	Qualifier
Host country	Japan	European QT	Netherlands	African QT	Kenya
World Ranking for Asian teams	South Korea	European QT	Italy	African QT	Algeria
World Ranking for Asian teams	Thailand	North American QT 2nd	Dominican Republic	North American QT 3rd	Puerto Rico
World Ranking for Asian teams	Kazakhstan	South American QT 2nd	Peru	South American QT 3rd	Colombia

- Egypt withdrew from the tournament. Therefore, Algeria, as the fourth place team in the African qualifier, replaced Egypt.

=== 1st Tournament ===
- Venue: Tokyo Metropolitan Gymnasium, Tokyo, Japan
- Dates: 14–22 May 2016
- All times are Japan Standard Time (UTC+09:00).

Pos	Team	Pld	W	L	Pts	SW	SL	SR	SPW	SPL	SPR
1	Italy	7	6	1	17	18	7	2.571	586	517	1.133
2	Netherlands	7	5	2	16	17	7	2.429	571	465	1.228
3	Japan	7	5	2	14	18	10	1.800	644	571	1.128
4	South Korea	7	4	3	13	15	11	1.364	597	577	1.035
5	Thailand	7	4	3	12	15	12	1.250	597	592	1.008
6	Dominican Republic	7	2	5	6	7	16	0.438	517	542	0.954
7	Peru	7	2	5	6	7	16	0.438	462	549	0.842
8	Kazakhstan	7	0	7	0	3	21	0.143	426	587	0.726

Date	Time		Score		Set 1	Set 2	Set 3	Set 4	Set 5	Total	Report
14 May	10:10	South Korea	1–3	Italy	17–25	20–25	27–25	18–25		82–100	P2 P3
14 May	12:55	Thailand	3–1	Dominican Republic	26–24	26–28	25–16	25–20		102–88	P2 P3
14 May	15:40	Kazakhstan	1–3	Netherlands	12–25	25–21	14–25	8–25		59–96	P2 P3
14 May	19:15	Japan	3–0	Peru	25–23	25–10	25–14			75–47	P2 P3
15 May	10:10	Italy	3–1	Thailand	17–25	25–16	25–17	25–16		92–74	P2 P3
15 May	12:55	Peru	3–0	Dominican Republic	25–22	25–16	26–24			76–62	P2 P3
15 May	15:40	Netherlands	0–3	South Korea	27–29	23–25	21–25			71–79	P2 P3
15 May	19:20	Japan	3–0	Kazakhstan	25–14	25–15	25–11			75–40	P2 P3
17 May	10:10	Kazakhstan	1–3	Peru	25–19	22–25	23–25	23–25		93–94	P2 P3
17 May	12:55	Dominican Republic	0–3	Italy	22–25	23–25	23–25			68–75	P2 P3
17 May	15:40	Thailand	0–3	Netherlands	14–25	16–25	20–25			50–75	P2 P3
17 May	19:15	South Korea	3–1	Japan	28–26	25–17	17–25	25–19		95–87	P2 P3
18 May	10:10	Peru	0–3	Italy	19–25	16–25	17–25			52–75	P2 P3
18 May	12:55	Kazakhstan	0–3	South Korea	16–25	11–25	21–25			48–75	P2 P3
18 May	15:40	Netherlands	3–0	Dominican Republic	25–22	25–18	25–21			75–61	P2 P3
18 May	19:20	Japan	3–2	Thailand	20–25	25–23	23–25	25–23	15–13	108–109	P2 P3
20 May	10:10	Thailand	3–0	Kazakhstan	25–18	25–19	25–15			75–52	P2 P3
20 May	12:55	South Korea	3–1	Peru	18–25	25–22	25–14	25–21		93–82	P2 P3
20 May	15:40	Italy	0–3	Netherlands	21–25	21–25	14–25			56–75	P2 P3
20 May	19:15	Dominican Republic	0–3	Japan	22–25	16–25	25–27			63–77	P2 P3
21 May	10:10	South Korea	2–3	Thailand	25–19	25–22	27–29	24–26	12–15	113–111	P2 P3
21 May	12:55	Kazakhstan	1–3	Dominican Republic	20–25	25–22	12–25	20–25		77–97	P2 P3
21 May	15:40	Peru	0–3	Netherlands	16–25	14–25	17–25			47–75	P2 P3
21 May	19:20	Japan	2–3	Italy	25–23	25–27	25–27	25–21	9–15	109–113	P2 P3
22 May	10:10	Dominican Republic	3–0	South Korea	25–23	25–11	28–26			78–60	P2 P3
22 May	12:55	Thailand	3–0	Peru	25–17	26–24	25–23			76–64	P2 P3
22 May	15:40	Italy	3–0	Kazakhstan	25–22	25–16	25–19			75–57	P2 P3
22 May	19:15	Netherlands	2–3	Japan	25–20	13–25	25–21	30–32	11–15	104–113	P2 P3

==== Individual awards ====
- Best outside spiker
  - Kim Yeon-Koung (KOR)
  - Antonella Del Core (ITA)
- Best opposite
  - Lonneke Sloetjes (NED)
- Best middle blocker
  - Yang Hyo-Jin (KOR)
  - Cristina Chirichella (ITA)
- Best setter
  - Haruka Miyashita (JPN)
- Best libero
  - Brenda Castillo (DOM)

=== 2nd Tournament ===
- Venue: Roberto Clemente Coliseum, San Juan, Puerto Rico
- Dates: 20–22 May 2016
- All times are Central Daylight Time (UTC−04:00).

Pos	Team	Pld	W	L	Pts	SW	SL	SR	SPW	SPL	SPR
1	Puerto Rico	3	3	0	9	9	0	MAX	226	138	1.638
2	Colombia	3	2	1	6	6	3	2.000	209	164	1.274
3	Kenya	3	1	2	3	3	7	0.429	186	219	0.849
4	Algeria	3	0	3	0	1	9	0.111	148	248	0.597

Date	Time		Score		Set 1	Set 2	Set 3	Set 4	Set 5	Total	Report
20 May	17:10	Kenya	0–3	Colombia	14–25	15–25	13–25			42–75	P2 P3
20 May	20:10	Puerto Rico	3–0	Algeria	25–10	25–11	25–12			75–33	P2 P3
21 May	17:10	Kenya	3–1	Algeria	25–14	23–25	25–14	25–16		98–69	P2 P3
21 May	20:10	Puerto Rico	3–0	Colombia	25–17	26–24	25–18			76–59	P2 P3
22 May	15:10	Algeria	0–3	Colombia	16–25	12–25	18–25			46–75	P2 P3
22 May	18:10	Puerto Rico	3–0	Kenya	25–8	25–23	25–15			75–46	P2 P3

== See also ==
- Volleyball at the 2016 Summer Olympics – Men's qualification
