= Kimberly Hill =

American volleyball player (born 1989)

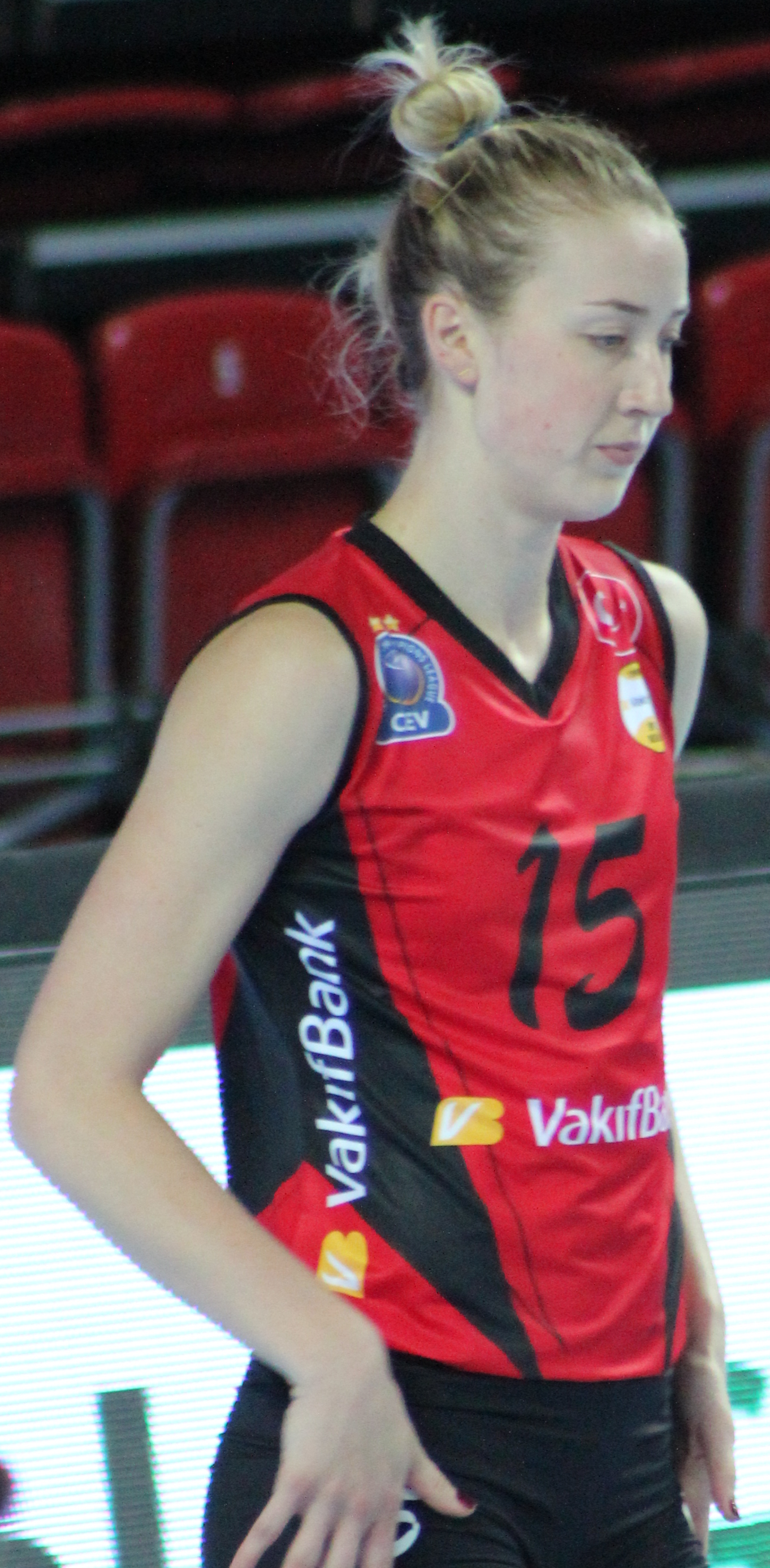
- Hill in 2016

Personal information
- Full name: Kimberly Hill
- Nickname: Kimmy, Kim Hill
- Born: November 30, 1989 (age 36); Portland, Oregon, U.S.
- Hometown: Portland, Oregon, U.S
- Height: 1.93 m (6 ft 4 in)
- Weight: 72 kg (159 lb)
- Spike: 320 cm (126 in)
- Block: 310 cm (122 in)
- Education: Pepperdine University

Volleyball information
- Position: Outside hitter
- Number: 15

Career
Years	Teams
2013–2014	(Poland) Atom Trefl Sopot
2014–2015	(Italy) AGIL Volley Novara
2015–2017	(Turkey) Vakıfbank Istanbul
2017–2021	(Italy) Imoco Volley Conegliano

National team
2013–2021	United States
Medal record
Volleyball
Olympic Games
Gold medal – first place	2020 Tokyo	Team
Bronze medal – third place	2016 Rio de Janeiro	Team
World Championship
Gold medal – first place	2014 Italy	Team
World Cup
Silver medal – second place	2019 Japan	Team
Bronze medal – third place	2015 Japan	Team
World Grand Champions Cup
Silver medal – second place	2013 Japan	Team
Bronze medal – third place	2017 Japan	Team
World Grand Prix
Gold medal – first place	2015 Omaha	Team
Silver medal – second place	2016 Bangkok	Team
FIVB Nations League
Gold medal – first place	2018 Nanjing	Team
Gold medal – first place	2021 Rimini	Team
NORCECA Championship
Silver medal – second place	2019 San Juan	Team

Kimberly Hill (born November 30, 1989) is an American former professional volleyball player who played as an outside hitter for the United States women's national volleyball team. Hill won gold with the national team at the 2014 World Championship and the 2020 Tokyo Summer Olympics, and bronze at the 2016 Rio Olympic Games.

== Early life ==
Kimberly Hill was born in Portland, Oregon to Bradd and Terri Hill. She has three siblings: Kelsey Hill, Shelby Hill, and Caitlin Volk.

== Career ==
Hill graduated from Portland Christian High School in 2008. She played four years of indoor volleyball (2008–11) for Pepperdine University and two years of beach volleyball (2012–13).

Hill was the first college volleyball player to earn AVCA All-American first team honors in both indoor and beach. She received the accolades in 2011 with the indoor squad, and in 2012 and 2013 on the beach. Hill was also the 2011 West Coast Conference Player of the Year and the WCC's Female Scholar-Athlete of the Year. She was a member of the inaugural AVCA national champions in the sport of beach volleyball in 2012.

Hill won a gold medal at the 2014 World Championship when the USA national team defeated China 3–1. She was also selected tournament's Most Valuable Player and Second Best Outside Spiker. Hill won the 2016 World Grand Prix Best Outside Hitter individual award and the silver medal.

Hill won the 2016–17 CEV Champions League gold medal with VakıfBank Istanbul when her team defeated the Italian Imoco Volley Conegliano 3–0 and she was also awarded Best Outside Spiker. She was selected to play the Italian League All-Star game in 2017.

On June 7, 2021, US National Team head coach Karch Kiraly announced she would be part of the 12-player Olympic roster for the 2020 Summer Olympics in Tokyo. Hill saw action as a serving specialist, and won the gold medal with her team. Shortly after the Olympic Games concluded, she officially announced her retirement from the US National Team.

In January 2022, Long Beach State athletics announced that Hill joined the Women's volleyball coaching staff.

== Clubs ==
- (United States) Pepperdine Waves (2008–2012)
- (Poland) Atom Trefl Sopot (2013–2014)
- (Italy) AGIL Volley (2014–2015)
- (Turkey) Vakıfbank Istanbul (2015–2017)
- (Italy) Imoco Volley Conegliano (2017–2021)

== Awards ==
=== Individual ===
- 2014 FIVB World Championship "Most valuable player"
- 2014 FIVB World Championship "Best outside spiker"
- 2015–16 CEV Women's Champions League "Best outside spiker"
- 2015–16 Turkish Women's Volleyball League "Most valuable player"
- 2016 World Grand Prix "Best outside spiker"
- 2016–17 CEV Champions League "Best outside spiker"
- 2017–18 CEV Champions League "Best outside spiker"
- 2019 FIVB Volleyball Women's Club World Championship "Best outside spiker"

=== Clubs ===
- 2014–15 Coppa Italia - Champion, with AGIL Volley Novara
- 2015–16 CEV Champions League - Runner-Up, with Vakıfbank Istanbul
- 2015–16 Turkish Women's Volleyball League - Champion, with Vakıfbank Istanbul
- 2016 Club World Championship - Bronze medal, with Vakıfbank Istanbul
- 2016–17 CEV Champions League - Champion, with VakıfBank Istanbul
- 2017 Club World Championship - Champion, with VakıfBank Istanbul
- 2017–18 Italian League - Champion, with Imoco Volley Conegliano
- 2018 Italian Supercup - Champions, with Imoco Volley Conegliano
- 2018–19 Italian League - Champion, with Imoco Volley Conegliano
- 2018–19 CEV Champions League - Runner-Up, with Imoco Volley Conegliano
- 2019 Italian Supercup - Champions, with Imoco Volley Conegliano
- 2019 FIVB Volleyball Women's Club World Championship - Champion, with Imoco Volley Conegliano
- 2020 Italian Supercup - Champions, with Imoco Volley Conegliano
- 2020-21 Italian Cup (Coppa Italia) - Champion, with Imoco Volley Conegliano
- 2020–21 Italian League - Champion, with Imoco Volley Conegliano
- 2020–21 CEV Women's Champions League - Champion, with Imoco Volley Conegliano

=== National team ===
- 2013 FIVB World Grand Champions Cup
- 2013 Women's NORCECA Volleyball Continental Championship
- 2014 FIVB World Championship
- 2015 FIVB World Grand Prix
- 2015 FIVB Women's World Cup
- 2015 Women's NORCECA Volleyball Continental Championship
- 2016 Women's NORCECA Olympic Qualification Tournament
- 2016 FIVB World Grand Prix
- 2016 Summer Olympics
- 2017 FIVB World Grand Champions Cup
- 2018 FIVB Volleyball Women's Nations League
- 2019 FIVB Women's Volleyball Intercontinental Olympic Qualifications Tournament (IOQT) - Qualified
- 2019 FIVB Women's World Cup
- 2019 Women's NORCECA Volleyball Continental Championship
- 2021 FIVB Volleyball Women's Nations League
- 2020 2020 Summer Olympics

Awards
Preceded by (Russia) Yekaterina Gamova	Most Valuable Player of World Championship; 2014	Succeeded by (Serbia) Tijana Bošković
Preceded by -	Best Outside Hitter of World Championship; 2014 ex aequo (China) Zhu Ting	Succeeded by (China) Zhu Ting (Italy) Miriam Sylla
Preceded by (Brazil) Natália Pereira (United States) Kelsey Robinson	Best Outside Hitter of FIVB World Grand Prix; 2016 ex aequo (Brazil) Sheilla Castro	Succeeded by (China) Zhu Ting (Brazil) Natália Pereira
Preceded by (Dominican Republic) Bethania de la Cruz (Czech Republic) Helena Havelková	Best Outside Hitter of CEV Champions League; 2015–2016 ex aequo (South Korea) Kim Yeon-Koung; 2016–2017 ex aequo (United States) Kelsey Robinson; 2017–2018 ex aequo (China) Zhu Ting	Succeeded by TBD
