= Natália Pereira =

Brazilian volleyball player (born 1989)

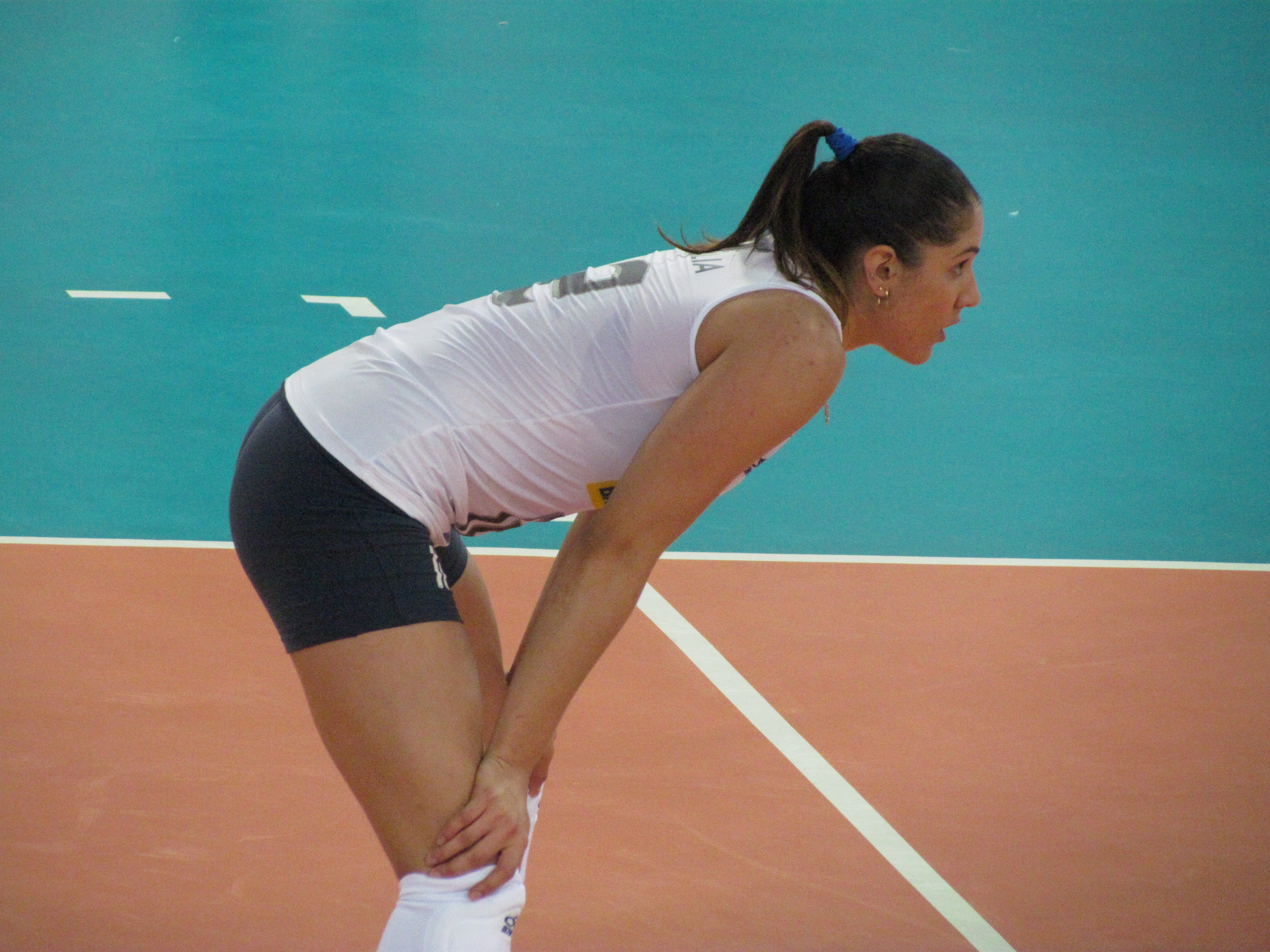
- Pereira at the 2011 FIVB World Grand Prix

Personal information
- Full name: Natália Zilio Pereira
- Born: April 4, 1989 (age 37); Joaçaba, Santa Catarina, Brazil
- Height: 1.86 m (6 ft 1 in)
- Weight: 83 kg (183 lb)
- Spike: 311 cm (122 in)
- Block: 295 cm (116 in)

Volleyball information
- Position: Outside hitter
- Current club: (China) Tianjin Bohai Bank
- Number: 12

National team
2005–2021	Brazil
Honours
Women's volleyball
Representing Brazil
Olympic Games
Gold medal – first place	2012 London	Team
Silver medal – second place	2020 Tokyo	Team
World Championship
Silver medal – second place	2010 Japan	Team
Bronze medal – third place	2014 Italy	Team
World Cup
Silver medal – second place	2007 Japan	Team
World Grand Champions Cup
Gold medal – first place	2005 Japan	Team
Gold medal – first place	2013 Japan	Team
Silver medal – second place	2009 Japan	Team
Silver medal – second place	2017 Japan	Team
Nations League
Silver medal – second place	2019 Nanjing	Team
Silver medal – second place	2021 Rimini	Team
World Grand Prix
Gold medal – first place	2006 Calabria	Team
Gold medal – first place	2009 Tokyo	Team
Gold medal – first place	2013 Sapporo	Team
Gold medal – first place	2014 Tokyo	Team
Gold medal – first place	2016 Bangkok	Team
Gold medal – first place	2017 Nanjing	Team
Silver medal – second place	2010 Ningbo	Team
Silver medal – second place	2011 Macau	Team
Silver medal – second place	2012 Ningbo	Team
Bronze medal – third place	2015 Omaha	Team
Pan-American Cup
Gold medal – first place	2009 Miami
Gold medal – first place	2011 Ciudad Juárez
Silver medal – second place	2007 Colima
Silver medal – second place	2008 Tijuana
Montreux Volley Masters
Gold medal – first place	2009 Switzerland
Gold medal – first place	2017 Switzerland	Team
South American Championship
Gold medal – first place	2009 Porto Alegre
Gold medal – first place	2013 Ica
Gold medal – first place	2015 Cartagena
Gold medal – first place	2017 Cali
Gold medal – first place	2021 Barrancabermeja

Natália Zilio Pereira (born 4 April 1989) is a Brazilian professional volleyball player who won the gold medal with the Brazilian national volleyball team in the 2012 Summer Olympics.

== Career ==
Pereira was part of the Brazilian team who won the gold medal in the 2012 Summer Olympics.

During the 2015 FIVB Club World Championship, Pereira played with the Brazilian club Rexona Ades Rio and her team lost the bronze medal match to the Swiss Voléro Zürich. She won the Most Valuable Player award and the gold medal of the 2016 FIVB World Grand Prix. One year later, she won the 2017 FIVB World Grand Prix gold medal and the Most Valuable Player and Best Outside Spiker individual awards. Pereira won the 2017 South American Championship Best Outside Spiker.

== Clubs ==
- (Brazil) Sollys/Osasco (2006–2011)
- (Brazil) Unilever Vôlei (2011–2013)
- (Brazil) Vôlei Amil (2013–2014)
- (Brazil) Rexona Ades Rio (2014–2016)
- (Turkey) Fenerbahçe (2016–2018)
- (Brazil) Minas Tênis Clube (2018–2019)
- (Turkey) Eczacıbaşı VitrA (2019–2020)
- (Russia) Dynamo Moscow (2020–2021)
- (Italy) Savino del Bene Scandicci (2021-2022)
- (Russia) Dynamo Moscow (2022–2024)
- (Brazil) Osasco/São Cristovão Saúde (2024–2025)
- (United States) Athletes Unlimited Pro League (2025)
- (China) Tianjin Bohai Bank (2025–2026)

== Awards ==
=== Individuals ===
- 2005 FIVB U18 World Championship – "Most valuable player"
- 2007 FIVB U20 World Championship – "Most valuable player"
- 2007 FIVB U20 World Championship – "Best scorer"
- 2007 FIVB U20 World Championship – "Best spiker"
- 2009 South American Club Championship – "Best spiker"
- 2010 South American Club Championship – "Best spiker"
- 2015 FIVB World Grand Prix – "Best outside spiker"
- 2016 FIVB World Grand Prix – "Most valuable player"
- 2016–17 Turkish League – "Most valuable player"
- 2017 Montreux Volley Masters – "Best outside spiker"
- 2017 FIVB World Grand Prix – "Best outside spiker"
- 2017 FIVB World Grand Prix – "Most valuable player"
- 2017 South American Championship – "Best outside spiker"
- 2018–19 Brazilian Superliga – "Best outside spiker"
- 2020–21 Russian Superleague – "Best outside spiker"

=== Clubs ===
- 2009–10 Brazilian Superliga – Champion, with Sollys Osasco
- 2012–13 Brazilian Superliga – Champion, with Unilever Vôlei
- 2014–15 Brazilian Superliga – Champion, with Rexona/Ades
- 2015–16 Brazilian Superliga – Champion, with Rexona/Ades
- 2016–17 Turkish Cup – Champion, with Fenerbahçe
- 2016–17 Turkish League – Champion, with Fenerbahçe
- 2018–19 Brazilian Superliga – Champion, with Itambé/Minas
- 2019–20 Turkish Supercup – Champion, with Eczacıbaşı VitrA
- 2022–23 Russian Cup – Champion, with Dinamo Moscow
- 2022–23 Russian League – Champion, with Dinamo Moscow
- 2023–24 Russian Cup – Champion, with Dinamo Moscow
- 2024–25 Brazilian Superliga – Champion, with Osasco/São Cristóvão
- 2009 South American Club Championship – Champion, with Sollys Osasco
- 2010 South American Club Championship – Champion, with Sollys Osasco
- 2013 South American Club Championship – Champion, with Unilever Vôlei
- 2015 South American Club Championship – Champion, with Rexona/Ades
- 2016 South American Club Championship – Champion, with Rexona/Ades
- 2019 South American Club Championship – Champion, with Itambé/Minas
- 2010 FIVB Club World Championship – Runner-Up with Sollys Osasco
- 2018 FIVB Club World Championship – Runner-Up with Itambé/Minas
- 2019 FIVB Club World Championship – Runner-Up with Eczacıbaşı VitrA
- 2022 CEV Challenge Cup – Champion, with Savino Del Bene Scandicci

Awards
Preceded by (China) Liu Xiaotong (Japan) Miyu Nagaoka - (Brazil) Sheilla Castro (United States) Kimberly Hill	Best Outside Spiker of FIVB World Grand Prix; 2015 ex aequo (United States) Kelsey Robinson; 2017 ex aequo (China) Zhu Ting	Succeeded by (Brazil) Sheilla Castro (United States) Kimberly Hill - Incumbent
Preceded by (United States) Karsta Lowe	Most Valuable Player of FIVB World Grand Prix; 2016; 2017	Succeeded by Incumbent
Preceded by (China) Hui Ruoqi (Thailand) Ajcharaporn Kongyot	Best Outside Spiker of Montreux Volley Masters; 2017 ex aequo (Argentina) Yamila Nizetich	Succeeded by Incumbent
Preceded by (Brazil) Gabriela Guimarães (Peru) Ángela Leyva	Best Outside Spiker of South American Championship; 2017 ex aequo (Peru) Ángela Leyva	Succeeded by (Colombia) Amanda Coneo (Peru) Karla Ortiz
