= Kelsey Robinson =

American volleyball player (born 1992)

Kelsey Robinson-Cook
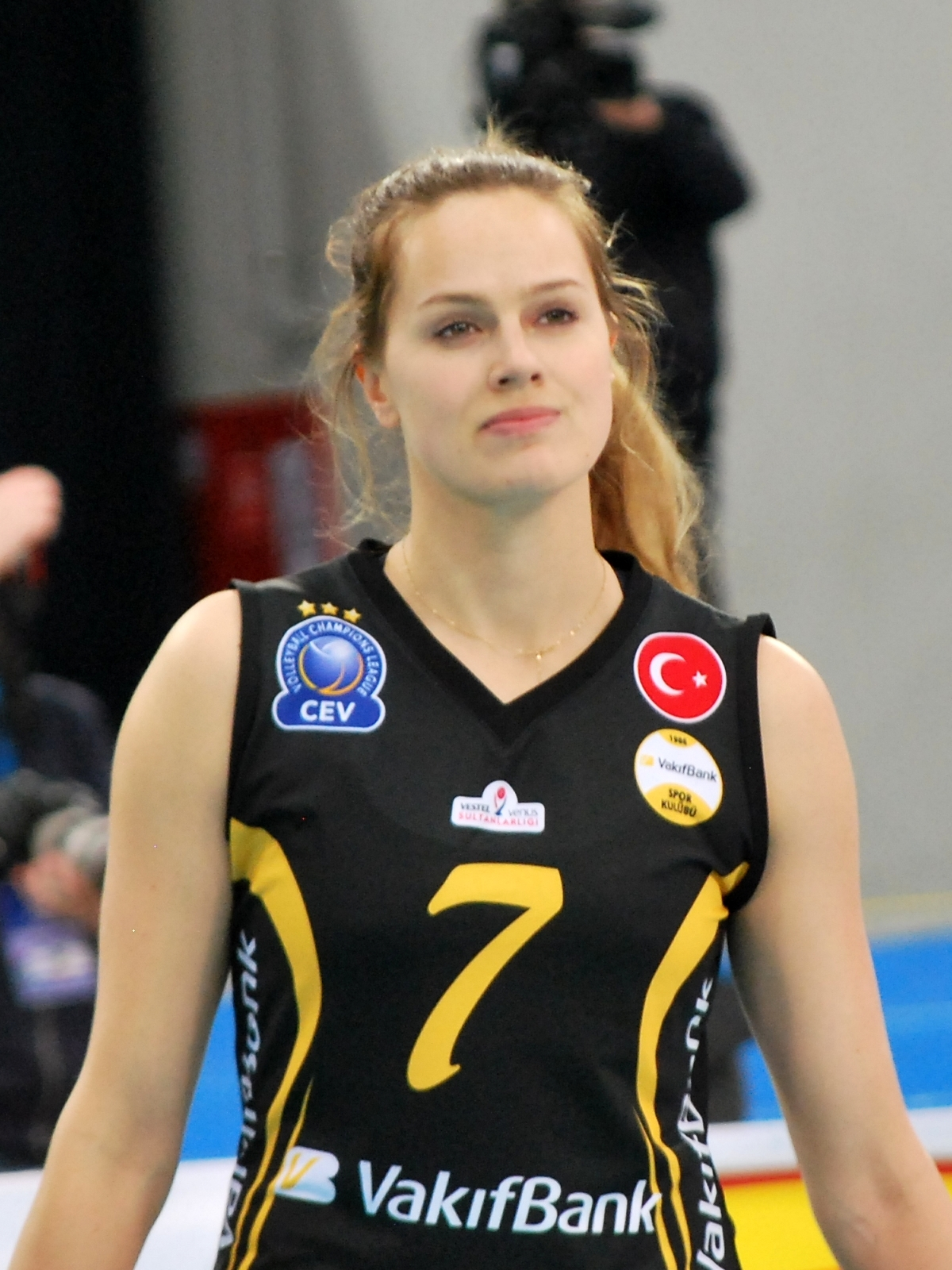
- Robinson in 2018

Personal information
- Nickname: Ke$ha
- Born: Kelsey Marie Robinson; June 25, 1992 (age 34); Elmhurst, Illinois, U.S.
- Height: 6 ft 2 in (1.88 m)
- Weight: 165 lb (75 kg)
- Spike: 120 in (306 cm)
- Block: 120 in (300 cm)
- Education: University of Tennessee; University of Nebraska–Lincoln

Volleyball information
- Position: Outside hitter / Libero
- Current club: (United States) LOVB Atlanta
- Number: 23 (national team) 23 (LOVB Atlanta)

National team
| 2014– | United States |
Medal record
Volleyball
Olympic Games
| Gold medal – first place | 2020 Tokyo | Team |
| Silver medal – second place | 2024 Paris | Team |
| Bronze medal – third place | 2016 Rio de Janeiro | Team |
World Championship
| Gold medal – first place | 2014 Italy | Team |
World Cup
| Silver medal – second place | 2019 Japan | Team |
| Bronze medal – third place | 2015 Japan | Team |
FIVB World Grand Prix
| Gold medal – first place | 2015 Omaha | Team |
| Silver medal – second place | 2016 Bangkok | Team |
FIVB Nations League
| Gold medal – first place | 2018 Nanjing | Team |
| Gold medal – first place | 2019 Nanjing | Team |
| Gold medal – first place | 2021 Rimini | Team |

Kelsey Marie Robinson Cook (born June 25, 1992) is an American volleyball player. She has been a member of the United States women's national volleyball team since 2014. A three-time Olympian, Robinson has a gold, silver, and bronze medal from the 2020, 2024, and 2016 Olympics respectively.

== Early life ==
Robinson was raised in Bartlett, Illinois. She attended St. Francis High School and graduated in 2010.

== College career ==
Robinson was recruited by coach John Cook at the University of Nebraska–Lincoln, but initially turned down the opportunity to play there due to believing she was not good enough to play at Nebraska. She played for three years at the University of Tennessee, where she was named the 2011 SEC Player of the Year. She then transferred to Nebraska where she played for her senior year and also on the inaugural Nebraska beach volleyball team. In 2013, she was named the Big Ten Player of the Year, and was named as one of four finalists for the Honda Sports Award in volleyball.

== Pro and international career ==
Robinson Cook was part of the USA national team that won the 2014 World Championship gold medal when their team defeated China 3–1 in the final match.

Robinson won the 2016–17 CEV Champions League silver medal with Imoco Volley Conegliano after losing the final match 0–3 to the Turkish VakıfBank Istanbul winning also the Best Outside Spiker award.

In May 2021, she was named to the 18-player roster for the FIVB Volleyball Nations League tournament. that was played May 25 – June 24 in Rimini, Italy. It was the only major international competition before the 2020 Summer Olympics in July.

On June 7, 2021, US National Team head coach Karch Kiraly announced she would be part of the 12-player Olympic roster for the 2020 Summer Olympics in Tokyo. USA won the gold medal for the first time in history.

Robinson was also a member of the US National Team during the 2024 Paris Olympics, where she won a silver medal with the team.

== Clubs ==
- (China) Beijing (2014–2015)
- (Puerto Rico) Leonas de Ponce (2015)
- (Italy) Imoco Volley Conegliano (2015–2016)
- (China) Beijing (2016–2017)
- (Italy) Imoco Volley Conegliano (2017)
- (Turkey) Vakıfbank Istanbul (2017–2019)
- (Turkey) Fenerbahçe (2019–2020)
- (China) Guangdong Evergrande (2020–2021)
- (Turkey) Fenerbahçe (2021)
- (Japan) Toyota Auto Body Queenseis (2021)
- (Italy) Imoco Volley Conegliano (2022–2024)
- (United States) LOVB Atlanta (2024–present)
- (Indonesia) Jakarta Electric PLN

(2024-2025)

== Awards ==
=== Individual ===
- 2015–16 Italian League "Most valuable player"
- 2016–17 CEV Champions League "Best outside spiker"
- 2015 FIVB World Grand Prix "Best outside hitter"
- 2019 FIVB World Cup "Best outside hitter"
- 2022 FIVB Club World Championship "Best outside hitter"
- 2025 Indonesia Proliga "Best Outside Hitter"

=== Clubs ===
- 2015–16 Italian League – Champion, with Imoco Volley Conegliano
- 2016–17 Italian Cup – Champion, with Imoco Volley Conegliano
- 2016–17 CEV Champions League – Runner-Up, with Imoco Volley Conegliano
- 2017 Turkish Super Cup – Champion, with Vakıfbank S.K.
- 2017–18 Turkish Cup – Champion, with Vakıfbank S.K.
- 2017–18 Turkish League – Champion, with Vakıfbank S.K.
- 2017–18 CEV Champions League – Champion, with Vakıfbank S.K.
- 2018 Turkish Super Cup – Runner-Up, with Vakıfbank S.K.
- 2018 FIVB Club World Championship – Champion, with Vakıfbank S.K.
- 2018–19 Turkish League – Champion, with Vakıfbank S.K.
- 2020–21 Turkish League – Runner-Up, with Fenerbahçe
- 2022 Italian Super Cup – Champion, with Imoco Volley Conegliano
- 2022 FIVB Club World Championship – Champion, with Imoco Volley Conegliano
- 2022–23 Italian Cup – Champion, with Imoco Volley Conegliano
- 2022–23 Italian League – Champion, with Imoco Volley Conegliano
- 2023 Italian Super Cup – Champion, with Imoco Volley Conegliano
- 2023–24 Italian Cup – Champion, with Imoco Volley Conegliano
- 2023–24 Italian League – Champion, with Imoco Volley Conegliano
- 2023–24 CEV Champions League – Champion, with Imoco Volley Conegliano

=== National team ===
- 2014 FIVB World Championship
- 2015 FIVB World Grand Prix
- 2015 FIVB Women's World Cup
- 2015 Women's NORCECA Volleyball Continental Championship
- 2016 Women's NORCECA Olympic Qualification Tournament
- 2016 FIVB World Grand Prix
- 2016 Summer Olympics
- 2017 FIVB World Grand Champions Cup
- 2018 FIVB Volleyball Women's Nations League
- 2019 FIVB Volleyball Women's Nations League
- 2019 FIVB Women's Volleyball Intercontinental Olympic Qualifications Tournament (IOQT) - Qualified
- 2019 FIVB Women's World Cup
- 2019 Women's NORCECA Volleyball Continental Championship
- 2021 FIVB Volleyball Women's Nations League
- 2021 2020 Summer Olympics
- 2024 2024 Summer Olympics

Awards
| Preceded by (China) Liu Xiaotong (Japan) Miyu Nagaoka | Best Outside Spiker of FIVB World Grand Prix; 2015 ex aequo (Brazil) Natália Pereira | Succeeded by (Brazil) Sheilla Castro (United States) Kimberly Hill |
| Preceded by (South Korea) Kim Yeon-Koung (United States) Kimberly Hill | Best Outside Spiker of CEV Champions League; 2016–2017 ex aequo (United States) Kimberly Hill | Succeeded by (China) Zhu Ting (United States) Kimberly Hill |
| Preceded by (Serbia) Brankica Mihajlović (Russia) Tatiana Kosheleva | Best Outside Spiker of World Cup; 2019 ex aequo (China) Zhu Ting | Succeeded by Incumbent |
