= Yuan Xinyue =

Chinese volleyball player

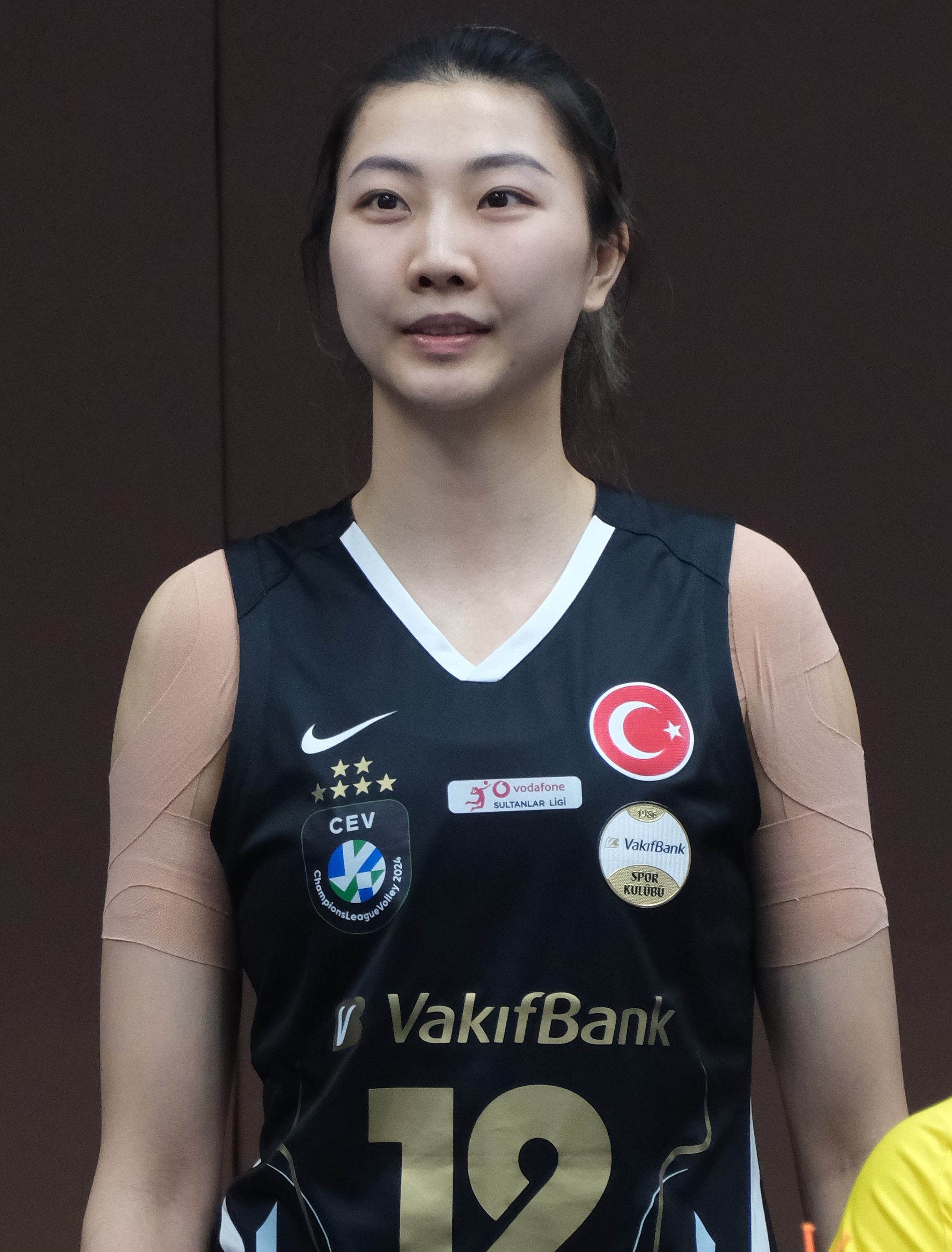
- Yuan in 2025

Personal information
- Nickname: Small Apple (小苹果)
- Nationality: Chinese
- Born: 21 December 1996 (age 29) Chongqing
- Height: 2.03 m (6 ft 8 in)
- Weight: 78 kg (172 lb)
- Spike: 325 cm (128 in)
- Block: 315 cm (124 in)

Volleyball information
- Position: Middle Blocker
- Current club: VakıfBank S.K.
- Number: 1 (NT) 8 (Club)

Career
- Years: Team
- 2009–2013 2013–2014 2014–2020 2017–2018 (loaned) 2020–2024 2024–2025: Bayi; Guangdong Evergrande; Bayi; Jiangsu; Tianjin Bohai Bank; VakıfBank S.K.

National team
- Years: Team
- 2014–: China
Honours
Volleyball
Olympic Games
Gold medal – first place	2016 Rio de Janeiro	Team
World Championship
Silver medal – second place	2014 Italy	Team
Bronze medal – third place	2018 Japan	Team
FIVB World Cup
Gold medal – first place	2015 Japan	Team
Gold medal – first place	2019 Japan	Team
World Grand Champions Cup
Gold medal – first place	2017 Japan	Team
Volleyball Nations League
Silver medal – second place	2023 Arlington	Team
Bronze medal – third place	2018 Nanjing	Team
Asian Games
Gold medal – first place	2018 Jakarta-Palembang
Gold medal – first place	2022 Hangzhou	Team
Asian Championship
Gold medal – first place	2015 Tianjin

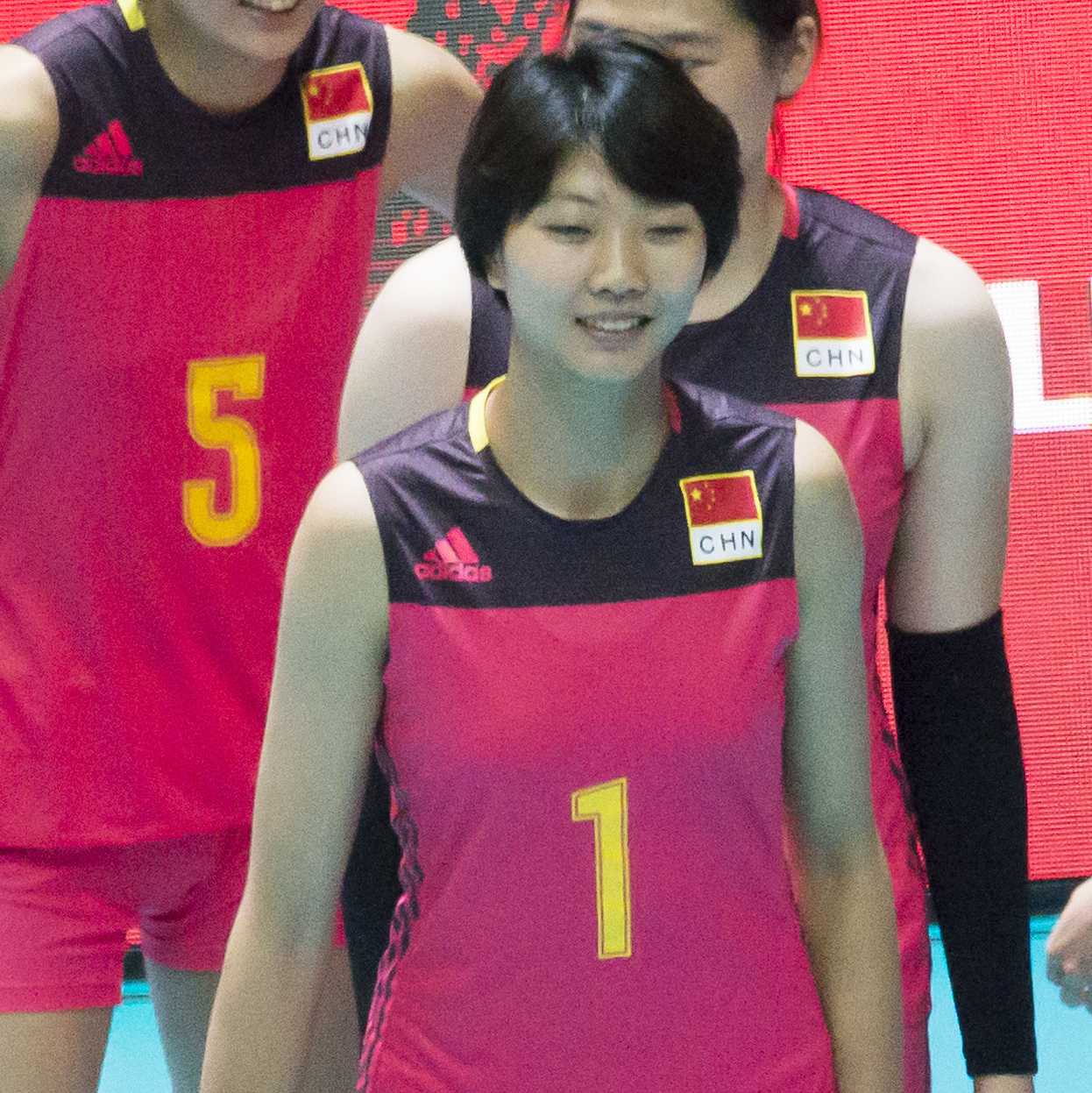

Yuan Xinyue (Chinese: 袁心玥; pinyin: Yuán Xīnyuè; born 21 December 1996) is a Chinese volleyball player. She is the former captain of the China women's national volleyball team. On club level, she plays for VakıfBank S.K.

At 2.03 metres (6 ft 8 in), Yuan is the tallest player in the history of the Chinese Women's Volleyball Team. Her height advantage allows her to have a formidable presence at the net, and she is widely considered as one of the key players in the team alongside her teammates Zhu Ting and Zhang Changning.

== Career ==
Yuan Xinyue started her career as a professional volleyball player in the Bayi team, which represents the People's Liberation Army in national competitions. Her outstanding performance at the 2013 U18 World Championships, in which she was recognised as the Most Valuable Player, caught the eye of Chinese Women's Volleyball Team's head coach, Lang Ping. That year, she was selected to join the senior team's training camp, and officially joined the senior squad in 2014.

Yuan was part of the Chinese national team at the 2014 FIVB Volleyball Women's World Championship in Italy, where she won the silver medal after China lost to the USA in the finals. In recognition of her impressive performance at the World Championship, she was awarded the Best Newcomer award at the 2014 CCTV Sports Personality Awards. In the following year, she participated in the 2015 FIVB Volleyball World Grand Prix, as well as the 2015 FIVB World Cup, where she helped the team win its first gold at a major world tournament after more than a decade.

In 2016, she represented China in the Rio Olympic Games. The team went on to win its 3rd gold medal, after victories in 1984 and 2004.

In 2017, she represented China in the FIVB Volleyball World Grand Prix and the FIVB World Grand Champions Cup, and helped the team win gold in the latter. She was awarded the Best Middle Blocker award in the World Grand Champions Cup.

In 2018, Yuan took part in the inaugural Volleyball Nations League, in which the team won bronze. In August, Yuan took part in the 2018 Asian Games held in Jakarta, Indonesia. The team dominated the competition with eight 3–0 victories and won the championship title without dropping a single set. In October, Yuan represented China in the FIVB Volleyball Women's World Championships held in Japan. The team won bronze after being defeated by Italy in the semi-finals, in a gruelling five-set match.

In 2019, Yuan took part in the 2nd Volleyball Nations League. During the group stage held in Hong Kong, the Chinese team faced the same Italian squad which defeated them in the 2018 World Championships. After losing 0–2, China went on to win three consecutive sets, eventually securing a surprising 3–2 victory against Italy. Yuan played a crucial role in this victory. In particular, her block at set point in the third set helped China stay in the game.

In September 2019, Yuan again represented China in the FIVB Women's World Cup, in which China secured yet another world title after eleven straight wins. Throughout the tournament, China only lost three sets against their opponents. Yuan was a key figure in this overwhelming victory.

== Clubs ==
- (China) Bayi (2009–2013)
- (China) Guangdong Evergrande (2013–2014)
- (China) Bayi (2014–2020)
- (China) Jiangsu (2017–2018) (loaned)
- (China) Tianjin Bohai Bank (2020–2024)
- (Turkey) VakıfBank S.K. (2024–2025)

== Awards ==
=== National team ===
==== Junior team ====
- 2012 Asian Youth Girls Volleyball Championship – Silver Medal
- 2013 U18 World Championship – Gold Medal

==== Senior team ====
- 2014 World Championship – Silver Medal
- 2015 Asian Championship – Gold medal
- 2015 World Cup – Gold medal
- 2016 Olympic Games – Gold medal
- 2017 World Grand Champions Cup – Gold medal
- 2018 Volleyball Nations League – Bronze Medal
- 2018 Asian Games – Gold medal
- 2018 World Championship – Bronze Medal
- 2019 World Cup – Gold medal
- 2023 Volleyball Nations League – Silver Medal
- 2022 Asian Games： Gold medal

==== Individuals ====
- 2012 Asian Youth Girls Volleyball Championship "Best Blocker"
- 2013 FIVB U18 World Championship "Most Valuable Player"
- 2013 FIVB U18 World Championship "Best Middle Blocker"
- 2017 FIVB World Grand Champions Cup – "Best Middle Blocker"
- 2023 FIVB Nations League "Best Middle Blocker"

=== Clubs ===
- 2014–2015 Chinese Volleyball League – Gold medal, with Bayi
- 2017–2018 Chinese Volleyball League – Bronze medal, with Jiangsu
- 2021–2022 Chinese Volleyball League – Gold medal, with Tianjin
- 2023 FIVB Volleyball Women's Club World Championship – Bronze medal, with Tianjin
- 2023–2024 Chinese Volleyball League – Gold medal, with Tianjin

Awards
Preceded by (Russia) Iuliia Morozova and (Thailand) Pleumjit Thinkaow	Best Middle Blocker of World Grand Champions Cup; 2017 ex aequo (Brazil) Ana Carolina da Silva	Succeeded by TBD
