= Koyomi Iwasaki =

Japanese volleyball player (born 1989)

Koyomi Iwasaki (née Tominaga)
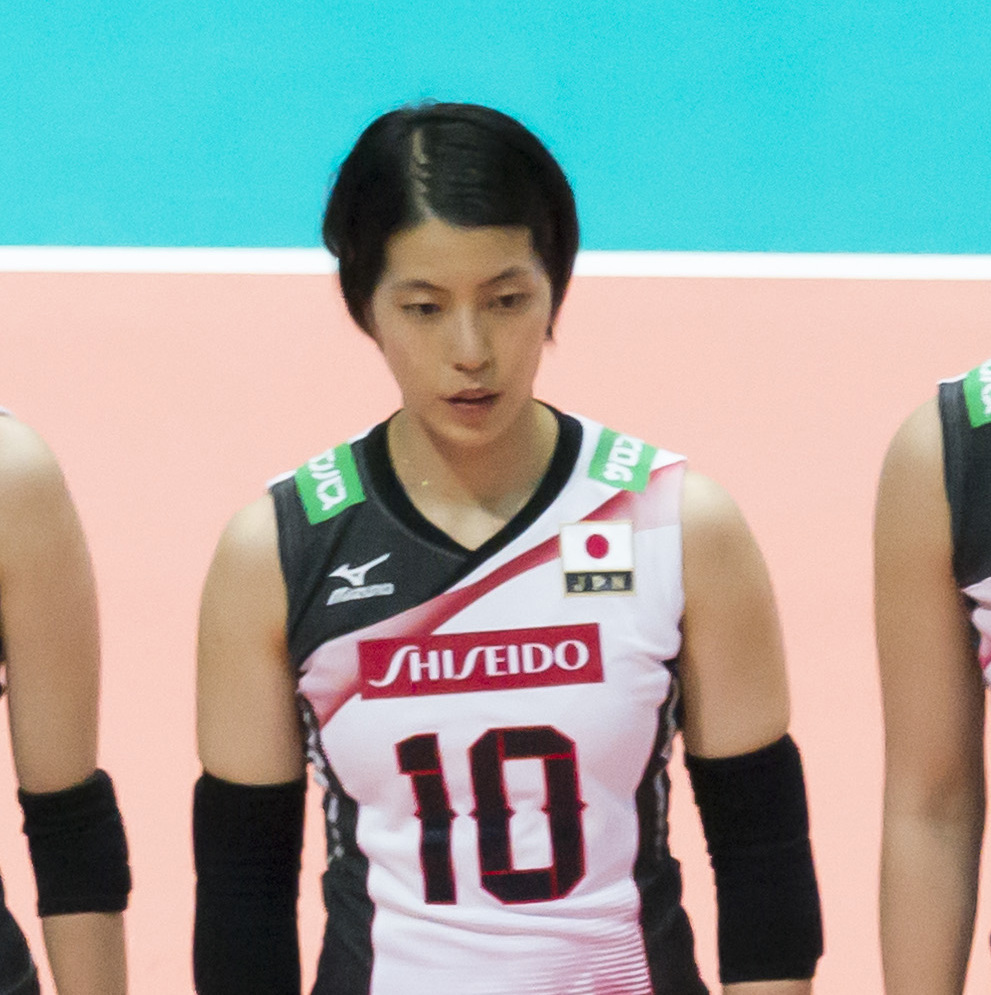
- 2017

Personal information
- Nationality: Japanese
- Born: 1 May 1989 (age 37) Komae, Tokyo
- Height: 175 cm (5 ft 9 in)
- Weight: 67 kg (148 lb)
- Spike: 303 cm (119 in)
- Block: 285 cm (112 in)

Volleyball information
- Position: Setter
- Current club: Saitama Ageo Medics
- Number: 2

Career
- Years: Team
- 2008–2014: Pioneer Red Wings
- 2014–2018: Ageo Medics
- 2018–2019: Lardini Filottrano (on loan)
- 2019–: Saitama Ageo Medics

National team
- Years: Team
- 2009–2010, 2017–2024: Japan
Honours
Women's volleyball
Representing Japan
FIVB Nations League
Silver medal – second place	2024 Bangkok	Team

Koyomi Tominaga (冨永 こよみ, Tominaga Koyomi; born 1 May 1989) or Koyomi Iwasaki (岩崎 こよみ, Iwasaki Koyomi) is a Japanese volleyball player. She plays as a setter for Japan women's national volleyball team.

== Career ==
Tominaga's career began at the elementary school when she started playing volleyball at the age of 9. Then she joined the volleyball team of Shimokitazawa Seitoku Senior High School in 2005. In the same year, she was chosen to join Japan's national youth squad to participate in the Under-17 Asian Youth Championship.

In 2006, she was again chosen as a member of the national team to participate in the Under-18 Asian Junior Volleyball Championship. She also played in the FIVB Women's Junior World Championship in the following year.

After graduating from senior high school, she joined the V.Premier League club Pioneer Red Wings in 2008.

At the end of the 2013–14 season, she moved to the Ageo Medics after Tohoku Pioneer announced the termination of the Red Wings.

She played for Lardini Filottrano of Italian Serie A1 in the 2018–19 season, on loan from Ageo Medics.

== National team ==
In 2009, she made her debut in Japan's senior national team, participating in the 2009 FIVB Women's World Grand Champions Cup and in the 2010 FIVB Volleyball World Grand Prix. She also participated in the 2017 FIVB World Grand Champions Cup, where she won the Best Setter Award.

Awards
Preceded by (Japan) Hitomi Nakamichi	Best Setter of World Grand Champions Cup; 2017	Succeeded by Defunct
