= Portland Christian Junior/Senior High School =

Portland Christian Middle & High School

Location
- 12425 NE San Rafael Street; Portland, Oregon 97230; United States; 45.540111°N 122.533779°W

Information
- Type: Private
- Opened: 1947
- Principal: Karen Banducci
- Grades: 6-12
- Enrollment: 373
- Colors: Purple and Gold
- Athletics conference: OSAA Northwest League 2A-1
- Mascot: Lion
- Team name: Royals
- Accreditation: ACSI, NAAS
- Affiliation: Christian
- Website: www.pcschools.org

Portland Christian Middle & High School is a 6-12 private Christian school in Portland, Oregon, United States. The school has been accredited by the Association of Christian Schools International since 1981, and by the Northwest Association of Accredited Schools since 1991.

== History ==
Portland Christian Schools was established in the fall of 1947 by local parents who wanted a Christian school present in the Portland area. These parents had a vision for a school where students could receive an education that was also rooted in Christian values. This would soon become the "Christian School Society of Portland, Oregon."

With just four teachers and eighty students in grades K-8 the school opened. In 1949 the school added high school classes and in 1951 Portland Christian School graduated its first class of ten students.

== Activities ==
The athletic programs compete in the 2A Division. Students are able to participate in cross country, volleyball, football, soccer, basketball, baseball, softball and track. Additional co-curricular activities include: National Honor Society, ski club, art club, drama club, worship team, jazz band, concert band, choir, ensemble, student government, an international club called Friends Across Borders (FAB) and a number of different community outreaches that students are able to participate in.

== Notable alumni ==
- Kim Hill, 2008, Olympic volleyball player
- Todd Hoffman, 1987, Gold Rush reality TV show participant
