= 1993 FIVB Volleyball Women's World Grand Champions Cup =

1993 World Grand Champions Cup
Tournament details
- Host country: Japan
- Dates: November 16–21
- Teams: 6
- Venues: 2 (in 2 host cities)

Final positions
- Champions: Cuba (1st title)

Tournament awards
- MVP: (Cuba) Regla Bell

The first World Grand Champions Cup women's volleyball was held in Japan from 16 to 21 November 1993.

== Teams ==
| Team | Qualified as |
|---|---|
| Japan | Host Nation |
| China | 1993 Asian Champions |
| Cuba | 1993 NORCECA Champions |
| Peru | 1993 South American Champions |
| Russia | 1993 European Champions |
| United States | Wild Card |

== Competition formula ==
The competition formula of the 1993 Women's World Grand Champions Cup is the single Round-Robin system. Each team plays once against each of the 5 remaining teams. Points are accumulated during the whole tournament, and the final standing is determined by the total points gained.

== Venues ==
- Yoyogi National Gymnasium (Tokyo)
- Osaka-jō Hall (Osaka)

== Results ==
| Pos | Team | Pld | W | L | Pts | SW | SL | SR | SPW | SPL | SPR |
|---|---|---|---|---|---|---|---|---|---|---|---|
| 1 | Cuba | 5 | 5 | 0 | 10 | 15 | 4 | 3.750 | 280 | 175 | 1.600 |
| 2 | China | 5 | 4 | 1 | 9 | 12 | 7 | 1.714 | 246 | 212 | 1.160 |
| 3 | Russia | 5 | 3 | 2 | 8 | 12 | 11 | 1.091 | 290 | 290 | 1.000 |
| 4 | Japan | 5 | 2 | 3 | 7 | 9 | 11 | 0.818 | 253 | 257 | 0.984 |
| 5 | United States | 5 | 1 | 4 | 6 | 8 | 14 | 0.571 | 237 | 299 | 0.793 |
| 6 | Peru | 5 | 0 | 5 | 5 | 6 | 15 | 0.400 | 217 | 290 | 0.748 |

=== Tokyo round ===
| Date | | Score | | Set 1 | Set 2 | Set 3 | Set 4 | Set 5 | Total |
|---|---|---|---|---|---|---|---|---|---|
| 16 Nov | Peru | 1–3 | Cuba | 15–13 | 4–15 | 7–15 | 8–15 | | 34–58 |
| 16 Nov | Russia | 2–3 | China | 9–15 | 15–7 | 13–15 | 15–11 | 11–15 | 63–63 |
| 16 Nov | Japan | 3–1 | United States | 17–15 | 13–15 | 15–8 | 15–13 | | 60–51 |
| 17 Nov | China | 0–3 | Cuba | 3–15 | 13–15 | 7–15 | | | 23–45 |
| 17 Nov | United States | 3–2 | Peru | 5–15 | 10–15 | 15–12 | 15–7 | 15–9 | 60–55 |
| 17 Nov | Russia | 3–2 | Japan | 15–13 | 7–15 | 17–15 | 11–15 | 15–12 | 65–70 |

=== Osaka round ===
| Date | | Score | | Set 1 | Set 2 | Set 3 | Set 4 | Set 5 | Total |
|---|---|---|---|---|---|---|---|---|---|
| 19 Nov | Russia | 1–3 | Cuba | 15–13 | 4–15 | 7–15 | 6–15 | | 32–58 |
| 19 Nov | China | 3–1 | United States | 15–7 | 15–6 | 9–15 | 15–6 | | 54–34 |
| 19 Nov | Japan | 3–1 | Peru | 8–15 | 15–6 | 15–13 | 15–1 | | 53–35 |
| 20 Nov | Cuba | 3–2 | United States | 13–15 | 15–6 | 15–17 | 15–10 | 15–10 | 74–58 |
| 20 Nov | Peru | 2–3 | Russia | 4–15 | 15–11 | 15–13 | 14–16 | 17–19 | 65–74 |
| 20 Nov | Japan | 1–3 | China | 14–16 | 17–15 | 8–15 | 3–15 | | 42–61 |
| 21 Nov | United States | 1–3 | Russia | 15–11 | 12–15 | 4–15 | 3–15 | | 34–56 |
| 21 Nov | Peru | 0–3 | China | 11–15 | 6–15 | 11–15 | | | 28–45 |
| 21 Nov | Cuba | 3–0 | Japan | 15–9 | 15–11 | 15–8 | | | 45–28 |

== Final standing ==
| Rank | Team |
|---|---|
| 1st place, gold medalist(s) | Cuba |
| 2nd place, silver medalist(s) | China |
| 3rd place, bronze medalist(s) | Russia |
| 4 | Japan |
| 5 | United States |
| 6 | Peru |

1993 FIVB Women's World Grand Champions Cup champions

Cuba
First title

Team Roster
Regla Bell, Mireya Luis, Idalmis Gato, Lilia Izquierdo, Magaly Carvajal, Marlenis Costa, Sonia Lescaille, Tania Ortiz, Marta Sánchez, Regla Torres, Ana Fernández, Mirka Francia
Head Coach: Eugenio George Lafita

== Individual awards ==
- MVP: (Cuba) Regla Bell
- Best scorer: (Russia) Yevgeniya Artamonova
- Best spiker: (Cuba) Regla Bell
- Best blocker: (Japan) Asako Tajimi
- Best server: (Russia) Yevgeniya Artamonova
- Best setter: (Cuba) Marlenis Costa
- Best receiver: (Cuba) Regla Bell
