= Zhu Ting (volleyball) =

Chinese volleyball player (born 1994)

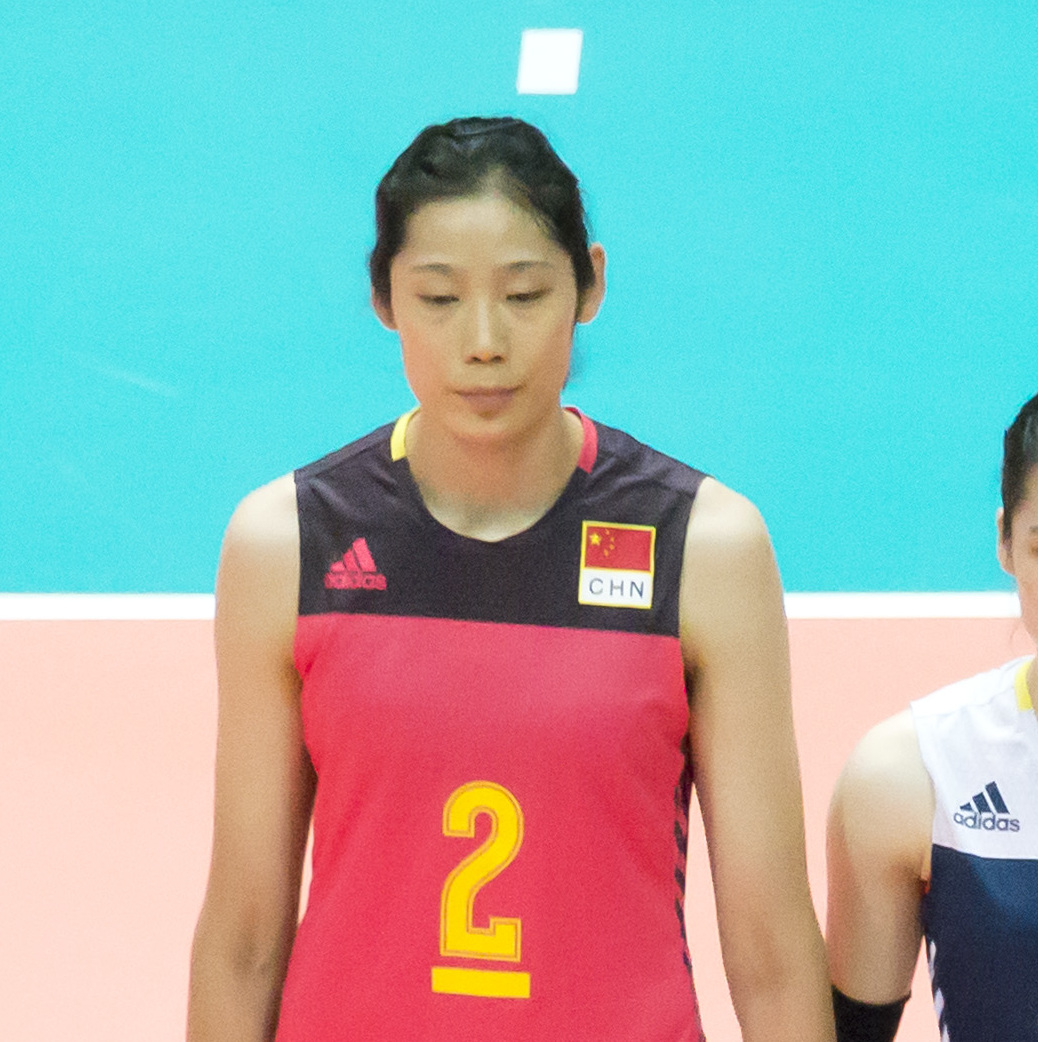

Personal information
- Nicknames: Zhu, Zhuper, MVP Harvester
- Nationality: Chinese
- Born: November 29, 1994 (age 31) Dancheng, Zhoukou, Henan, China
- Height: 1.98 m (6 ft 6 in)
- Weight: 74 kg (163 lb)
- Spike: 329 cm (130 in)
- Block: 315 cm (124 in)

Volleyball information
- Position: Outside hitter
- Current club: (Italy) Imoco Volley Conegliano
- Number: 2 (National team), 4 (Club)

Career
- Years: Team
- 2012–2013: (China) Guangdong Evergrande
- 2013–2016: (China) Henan Huawei
- 2016–2019: (Turkey) Vakıfbank Istanbul
- 2019–2021: (China) Tianjin Bohai Bank
- 2022–2024: (Italy) Savino del Bene Scandicci
- 2024–2027: (Italy) Imoco Volley Conegliano

National team
- Years: Team
- 2013–2021, 2024: China
Honours
Representing China
Volleyball
Olympic Games
Gold medal – first place	2016 Rio de Janeiro	Team
World Championship
Silver medal – second place	2014 Italy	Team
Bronze medal – third place	2018 Japan	Team
World Cup
Gold medal – first place	2015 Japan	Team
Gold medal – first place	2019 Japan	Team
World Grand Champions Cup
Gold medal – first place	2017 Japan	Team
World Grand Prix
Silver medal – second place	2013 Sapporo	Team
Volleyball Nations League
Bronze medal – third place	2018 Nanjing	Team
Asian Games
Gold medal – first place	2018 Jakarta-Palembang	Team
Asian Championship
Gold medal – first place	2015 Tianjin	Team
- Updated on June 2024

Zhu Ting (Chinese: 朱婷; pinyin: Zhū Tíng; born 29 November 1994) is a professional Chinese volleyball player. She is an outside hitter and former captain of the China women's national volleyball team. She currently plays for Imoco Volley Conegliano.

Zhu has won several gold medals in international competitions with the Chinese national team, including at the 2016 Olympic Games and the 2015 and 2019 World Cups.

Since her debut in 2011, Zhu has received multiple Most Valuable Player (MVP) awards at club and international competitions, including the MVP award for the women's volleyball tournament at the 2016 Rio Olympic Games. She has been recognized as one of the most accomplished indoor volleyball players of her generation and has received recogintion for her performances at both club and international levels. During the 2018–2019 season, she was reported to be the highest-paid professional volleyball player in the world, among both male or female players.

== Early life ==
Zhu Ting was born to a rural family in Henan Province. She has four sisters (two older sisters and two younger sisters) and her parents do not have any sports backgrounds.

In 2007, Zhu, who was 13 years old and 1.7 meters tall at the time, was sent to a sports training school by her high school physical education teacher. In 2008, she started professional volleyball training in the Henan Province sports school.

== Career ==
=== Junior and Youth National Team ===
==== 2010–2013: First MVP award at international tournament ====
After training professionally for two years, Zhu was selected to be on the Chinese Junior National team in 2010. She participated in 2011 FIVB Volleyball Girls' U18 World Championship and won a silver medal with the team. In 2012, she entered the U20 team and won the 2012 Asian Junior Women's Volleyball Championship. She was also awarded MVP for the first time. In 2013, she continued to represent China's U20 national team and attended the 2013 FIVB Volleyball Women's U20 World Championship, helping the team win the championship. She was awarded the MVP, Best Scorer, and Best Spiker of the tournament.

=== Senior National Team and Clubs ===
==== 2013: First year in China National Team and Bronze medal at Club World Championship ====
Zhu entered the Chinese senior national volleyball team for the first time in 2013, handpicked by Lang Ping who returned as head coach that year. Zhu participated in her first tournament in 2013 Montreux Volley Masters. Although the Chinese team finished in sixth place, Zhu was awarded Best Scorer of the tournament.

Zhu rose to prominence at the 2013 FIVB U20 World Championship where she helped her team to win the title without losing a set. She was awarded MVP and Best Outside Spiker in the tournament.

Playing her first Grand Prix at the 2013 FIVB Volleyball World Grand Prix, Zhu helped her team to win silver medal, the first in six years. She was awarded Best Outside Spiker of the tournament.

Zhu participated in the 2013 Club World Championship with Guangdong Evergrande, winning the bronze medal after defeating Voléro Zürich.

==== 2014: Silver medal at the World Championship ====
Zhu led the Chinese team to silver medal in the 2014 FIVB World Championship, the best result in 16 years. She scored 32 points in the semi-final against Italy but lost to the American Team in the final. Zhu was awarded Best Scorer as well as Best Outside Spiker.

==== 2015: Asian Champion and World Cup Champion with National Team ====
At the 2015 Asian Women's Volleyball Championship, the Chinese team won all matches and attained their 13th gold medal of the tournament. Zhu was awarded Most Valuable Player and Best Outside Spiker.

At the 2015 FIVB World Cup, the Chinese team won their 4th gold medal of the tournament and their first World Title since 2004 Athens Olympics. Zhu was awarded Most Valuable Player and became the third Chinese player since Sun Jinfang and Lang Ping to earn the title.

==== 2016: Olympics Gold Medal and first season overseas ====
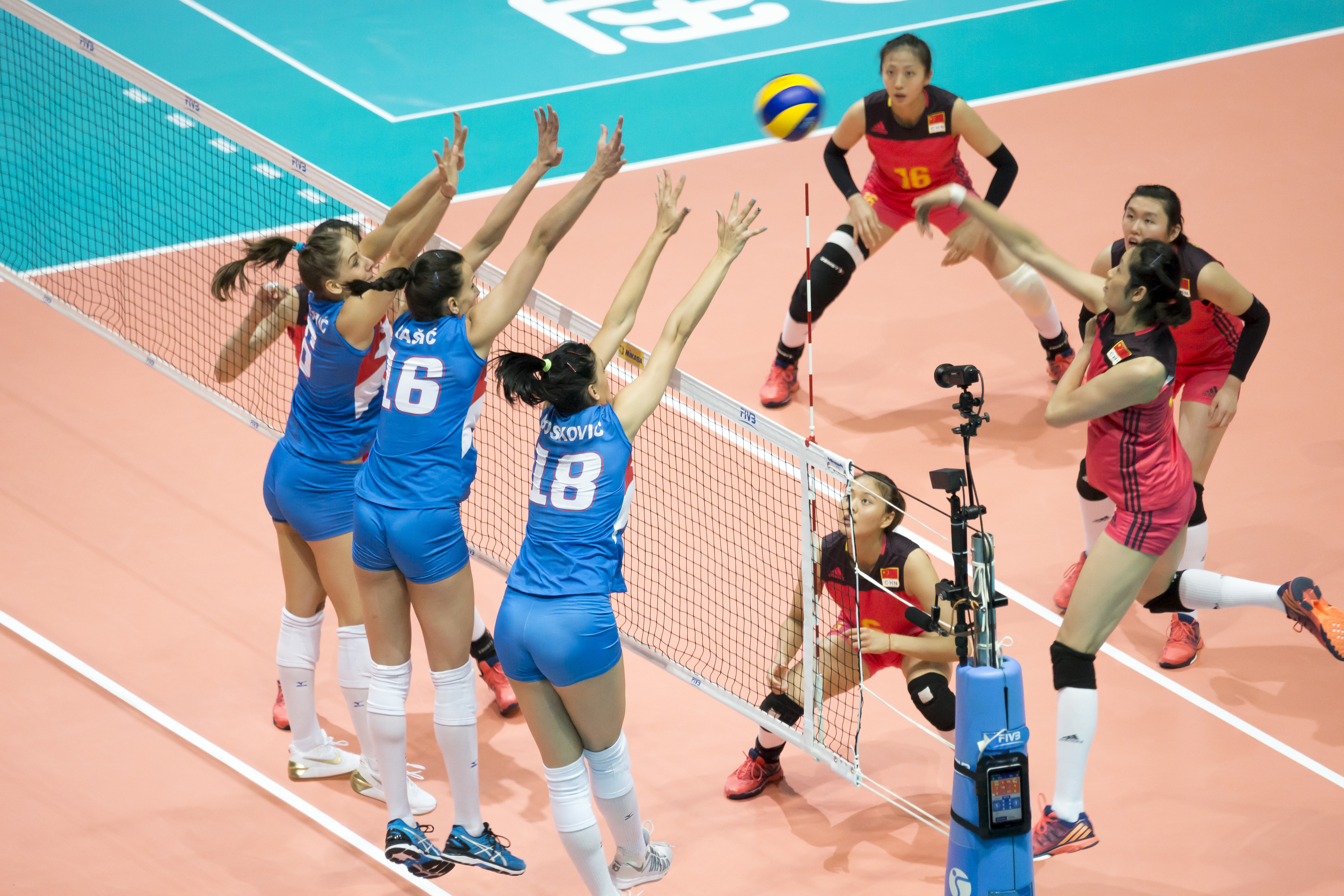
During the match of China against Serbia in 2017 FIVB World Grand Prix

At the 2016 Rio Olympics the Chinese team defeated the two-time defending champion, the Brazilian Team in 5 sets in the quarterfinal. Zhu scored 28 points. In the semifinal, they defeated the Netherlands in 4 sets. Zhu scored 33 points, thus ranked no.3 on all-time top scorers list in a single match in the Olympic games. In the final, China defeated Serbia in 4 sets to earn their third Olympics gold medal since 2004. Zhu finished as the top scorer with a total of 179 points. She was awarded MVP and Best Outside Spiker, and became the third Chinese player since Lang Ping and Feng Kun to earn the MVP title.

Zhu joined Turkish club Vakıfbank Istanbul, becoming the youngest Chinese player playing overseas, with the help of her original club Henan Huawei as well as her Chinese Team head coach Lang Ping.

At the 2016 FIVB Club World Championship, Vakıfbank finished 3rd place after defeating Voléro Zürich in the bronze medal match. Zhu was awarded Best Outside Hitter. She also became the first player in the tournament history to be the best scorer twice after scoring 103 points.

==== 2017: Second Year in Vakifbank, four MVPs at different levels of competition ====
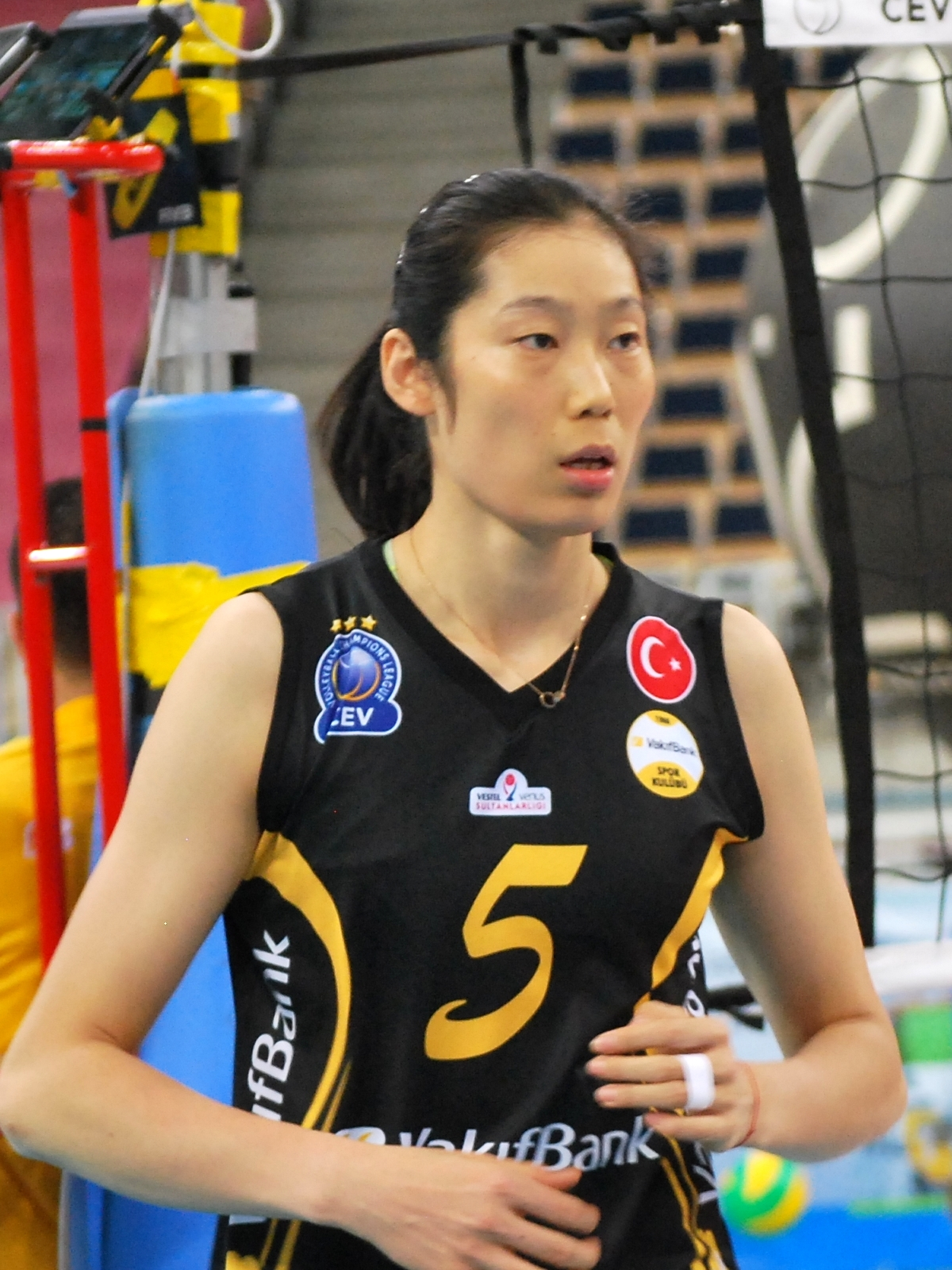
Zhu Ting plays for Vakifbank.

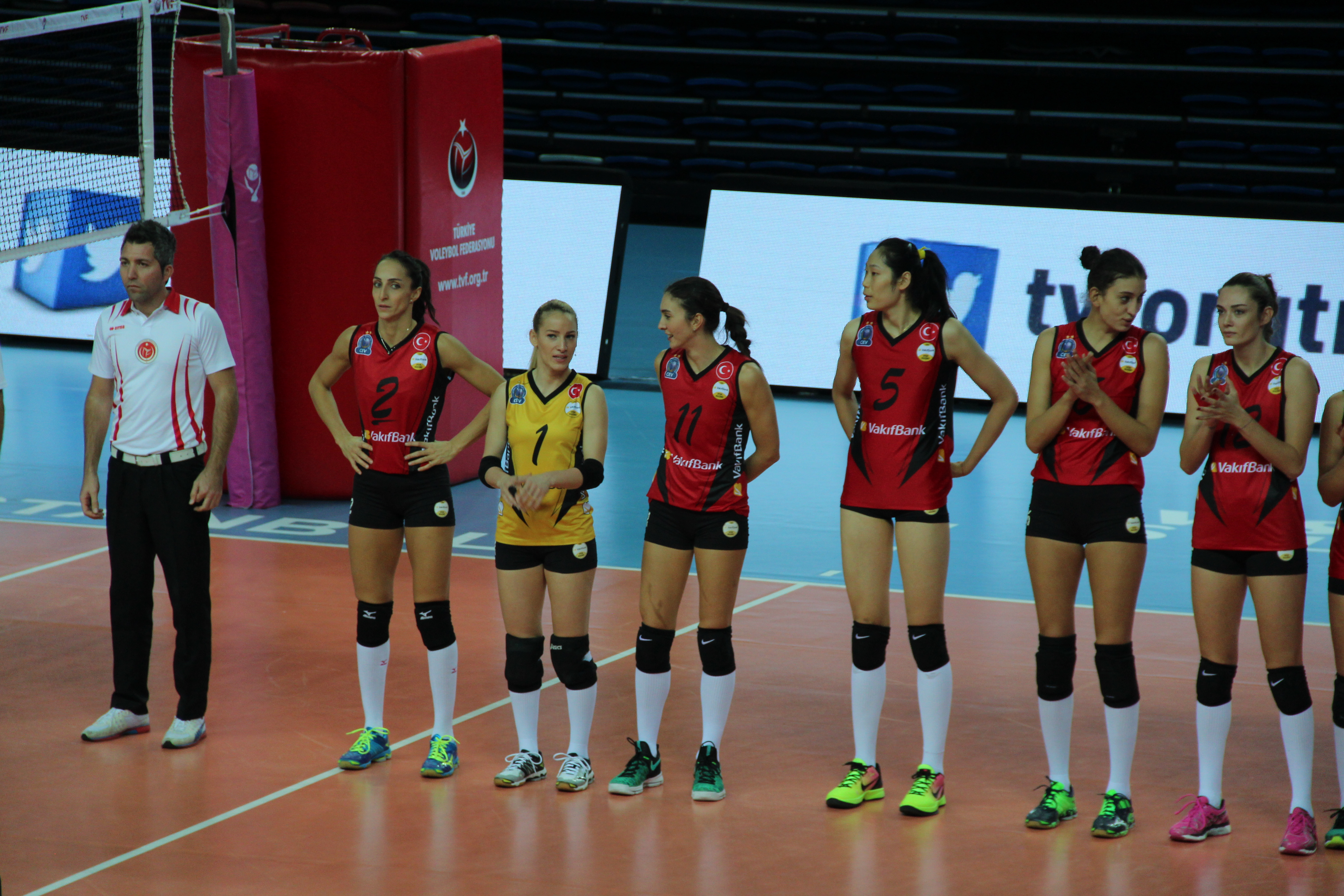
Zhu Ting and teammates of Vakifbank.

Zhu won the 2016–17 Turkish League Best Outside Spiker and Best Scorer awards. In the regular season, VakıfBank finished first with only one loss throughout. However, the team was stunned in the semifinal by Galatasaray S.K. and failed to reach the final, although they managed to finish third after defeating Eczacıbaşı VitrA.

At the 2016–17 CEV Champions League, VakıfBank won all six matches in the preliminary round. They defeated Voléro Zürich in two 3–1 matches to reach the semifinal. They then defeated Eczacıbaşı VitrA 3–0 to reach the final. Zhu scored 24 points. In the final VakıfBank defeated the host team Imoco Volley Conegliano to win their third title of the tournament. Zhu scored 22 points and was awarded MVP.

At the 2017 FIVB Club World Championship, VakıfBank remained undefeated in the group stage to reach the semifinal, where they beat Eczacıbaşı VitrA 3–1 to reach the final. They then defeated Rexona-Sesc Rio in straight sets to win the championship for a second time. Zhu was awarded MVP and Best Outside Spiker. She is the first Asian MVP in this tournament.

In June, VakıfBank announced the renewal of contract with Zhu for the coming season. She was reported to be the world's highest paid volleyball player for a reputed salary of €1.35 million (US$1.61 million and HK$12 million).

Zhu was named the new captain of China women's national volleyball team in 2017. She helped her team to reach fourth place in the 2017 FIVB World Grand Prix and was awarded Best Outside Spiker. China then won gold medal in the 2017 FIVB World Grand Champions Cup. Zhu was awarded Best Outside Spiker and MVP.

In December 2017, she won the Turkish Cup with VakıfBank and was selected as Most Valuable Player.

==== 2018: Third Year in Vakifbank and Bronze medal in 2018 World Championship with National Team ====
In March, VakıfBank beat Galatasary in the semifinal of 2017–18 Turkish Women's Volleyball League. Zhu scored 33 points in Round 2 to help the team enter the final. In April, Vakifbank beat Eczacıbaşı VitrA 3:2 in the final to win the championship title. Zhu was the highest scorer of her team. Significantly, in the last round of the match, Zhu scored 20 points with an attack success rate of 68%, extremely high even among the best attackers. With this title, Zhu won the first national league championship in her career and was awarded MVP.

In April, VakıfBank won Voléro Zürich in Playoff 6 of 2017–18 CEV Women's Champions League. Zhu scored 21 points in Second Leg to help the team enter final four of the tournament. In May, Vakifbank beat Italian club Imoco Volley and Romanian club CSM Volei Alba Blaj in the semifinal and final, eventually winning the club's 4th championship title. Zhu scored 24 points and 15 points in these two rounds and was awarded Best Outside Spiker.

Vakifbank swept all championship titles of the 2017–2018 season. With that, Zhu became the only volleyball player in the world to attain championship titles as well as MVP awards in club competitions of all levels, including the national, regional and world level.

On June 21, VakıfBank announced the renewal of contract with Zhu which is her third season with the club.

In July, Zhu returned to the National team and continued as a core player. She led the Chinese team to a bronze medal at the 2018 Nations League and was awarded Best Outside Spiker.

In September, she made her debut in the Jakarta Asian Games. The Chinese team was dominant throughout the tournament, winning the gold medal without dropping a single set.

From September to October, she led the Chinese team to a bronze medal at her second FIVB World Championship. She was again awarded Best Outside Spiker, her second at the Championship.

In December, Zhu played at the Club World Championship held in Zhejiang, China. With overwhelming support from her countrymen, she propelled Vakifbank to a resounding victory, beating two Brazilian clubs in the semifinal and final matches. Again, she was awarded the tournament's MVP and Best Outside Spiker.

==== 2019–2020: Second World Cup Champion and return to Chinese League ====
In March, Vakifbank beat Russian club Dinamo Moscow in the second round of the quarter-final of the 2018–19 CEV Women's Champions League. Zhu scored 17 points with a greater-than-60% attack success rate. The team advanced to the semi-final.

From April to May, Vakifbank beat Eczacıbaşı VitrA 3:2 again in the final of the 2018–19 Turkish Women's Volleyball League and won the championship title. In the 5 matches of the final, Zhu scored 106 attack points with a 50% success rate, ranking first amongst all spikers. She again received the tournament MVP award.

On 7 May, Zhu and Vakifbank announced that she would leave the team temporarily, in order to concentrate on training with the national team for the 2020 Summer Olympics. Zhu would return to Chinese League.

In September, Zhu played her second FIVB World Cup in Japan. She led team China to win all 11 matches, successfully defending their champion. Zhu received her second FIVB World Cup MVP award and was elected Best Outside Spiker.

On 1 October, Zhu announced via social media that she would join Chinese club Tianjin Bohai Bank in the coming season.

In December, Zhu and Tianjin team successfully enter the final of the 2019–20 Chinese Volleyball League. Zhu scored the highest points in the two semifinal matches against Beijing.

==== 2021: Chinese League Champion, Wrist Injury, Tokyo Olympics and aftermath ====
Zhu continued to play at Tianjin in the season 2020–21 and finally won the champion again. She received her second MVP award of Chinese Volleyball League.

Zhu was plagued by an ongoing wrist injury that first occurred in 2017. Instead of opting for radical surgery, she underwent conservative treatment due to her volleyball schedule. The injury continued to plague her at the Tokyo Olympics. After China's disappointing result in their bid to defend their Olympic champion, China's coaches and players were heavily criticized across social media by Chinese fans. In August 2021, Zhu announced she would be filing a lawsuit against internet trolls for harassment and for "deliberately smearing" her. Meanwhile, Zhu did not sign with any club in season 2021/22, as she planned to take a rest and wait for surgery.

==== 2022: Wrist surgery and recovery, Signed with Scandicci ====
Zhu announced on her Sina Weibo in April that she has successfully finished her wrist surgery and was undergoing rehabilitation.

On 2 July, Italian Serie A1 club Savino del Bene Scandicci announced the transfer of Zhu to their club in the coming season, which is her second overseas career experience.

On 3 November, Scandicci defeated Casalmaggiore 3–0 in regular season games. Zhu was substituted at set two and three and contributed 6 points, including 5 spikes. This was Zhu's first match after 14 months since Tokyo Olympics.

==== 2023: CEV Cup Champions and extended contract with Scandicci ====
On 13 April 2023, Scandicci beat CSM Volei Alba Blaj in straight sets to win their first Women's CEV Cup champion. Zhu scored 13 points. This was her first champion after her wrist surgery.

On 28 May, Scandicci officially announced the extension of contract with Zhu for one more season.

==== 2024: Return to Chinese National Team, Signed with Conegliano ====
On 8 April 2024, Zhu announced on her social media that she will return to Chinese National Team, and play at 2024 FIVB Volleyball Women's Nations League. Also, she entered the Chinese team roster of Paris Olympics, which was her third appearance at Olympics Games.

On 27 June, Italian Serie A1 club Imoco Volley Conegliano announced the signing of Zhu in the coming season, which is her third season at Italian League. She is the first Chinese player in the history of the club and will play with the number 4. Zhu finally won all the competitions champions with the team in this season.

==== 2025: Extended contract with Conegliano ====
On 20 June 2025, Imoco Volley Conegliano announced extended contract with Zhu in the coming season, which is her second season with the team.

== Career statistics ==
=== Club ===
Club	Season(s)	Achievement
(China) Guangdong Evergrande	2012–2013	x1
(China) Henan Huawei	2013–2016	–
(Turkey) Vakıfbank Istanbul	2016–2019	x8 x2 x2
(China) Tianjin Bohai Bank	2019–2021	x2
(Italy) Savino del Bene Scandicci	2022–2024	x1 x1 x1
(Italy) Imoco Volley Conegliano	2024–2026	x6 x2 x1

=== National team ===
Year	Achievement	No. of MVP received
Junior Team: 2012, 2013	x2	2
Senior Team: 2013	x1	–
2014	x1	–
2015	x2	2
2016	x1	1
2017	x1	1
2018	x1 x2	–
2019	x1 x1	1

=== Career statistics from 2013 to 2023 ===
Items	Statistics
Matches played (Sets)	431
Points	7657
Attack Success %	49.55
Attack Eff %	40.39

== Awards and individual honors ==
=== National team ===
==== Junior team ====
- 2011 U18 World Championship – Silver Medal
- 2012 Asian Junior Championship – Gold Medal
- 2013 U20 World Championship – Gold Medal

==== Senior team ====
- 2013 World Grand Prix – Silver Medal
- 2014 World Championship – Silver Medal
- 2015 Asian Championship – Gold Medal
- 2015 World Cup – Gold Medal
- 2016 Olympic Games – – Gold medal
- 2017 World Grand Champions Cup – Gold Medal
- 2018 Volleyball Nations League – Bronze Medal
- 2018 Asian Games – Gold Medal
- 2018 World Championship – Bronze Medal
- 2019 Volleyball Nations League – Bronze Medal
- 2019 World Cup – Gold Medal

=== Club ===
- 2013 Club World Championship – Bronze medal, with Guangdong Evergrande
- 2016 Club World Championship – Bronze medal, with VakıfBank
- 2016–17 Turkish Cup – Runner-Up, with VakıfBank
- 2016–17 CEV Champions League – Champion, with VakıfBank
- 2016–17 Turkish League – Bronze medal, with VakıfBank
- 2017 Club World Championship – Champion, with VakıfBank
- 2017 Turkish Super Cup – Champion, with VakıfBank
- 2017–18 Turkish Cup – Champion, with VakıfBank
- 2017–18 Turkish League – Champion, with VakıfBank
- 2017–18 CEV Champions League – Champion, with VakıfBank
- 2018 Turkish Super Cup – Runner-Up, with VakıfBank
- 2018 Club World Championship – Champion, with VakıfBank
- 2018–19 Turkish League – Champion, with VakıfBank
- 2019–20 Chinese League – Champion, with Tianjin Bohai Bank
- 2020–21 Chinese League – Champion, with Tianjin Bohai Bank
- 2022–23 Women's CEV Cup – Champion, with Savino del Bene Scandicci
- 2022–23 Italian League – Bronze medal, with Savino del Bene Scandicci
- 2023–24 Italian League – Runner-Up, with Savino del Bene Scandicci
- 2024 Club World Championship – Champion, with Imoco Volley Conegliano
- 2024–25 Italian Cup – Champion, with Imoco Volley Conegliano
- 2024–25 Italian League – Champion, with Imoco Volley Conegliano
- 2024–25 CEV Champions League – Champion, with Imoco Volley Conegliano
- 2025 Italian Super Cup – Runner-Up, with Imoco Volley Conegliano
- 2025 Club World Championship – Runner-Up, with Imoco Volley Conegliano
- 2025–26 Italian Cup – Champion, with Imoco Volley Conegliano
- 2025–26 Italian League – Champion, with Imoco Volley Conegliano
- 2025–26 CEV Champions League – Bronze medal, with Imoco Volley Conegliano
- 2026 Italian Super Cup – Champion, with Imoco Volley Conegliano

=== Individual awards ===
- 2012 Asian Junior Championship "Most valuable player"
- 2012 Asian Junior Championship "Best scorer"
- 2012 Asian Junior Championship "Best spiker"
- 2013 FIVB Junior World Championship "Most valuable player"
- 2013 FIVB Junior World Championship "Best outside hitter"
- 2013 Montreux Volley Masters "Best scorer"
- 2013 FIVB World Grand Prix "Best outside spiker"
- 2013 Asian Volleyball Championship "Best spiker"
- 2014 FIVB World Championship "Best scorer"
- 2014 FIVB World Championship "Best outside spiker"
- 2015 Asian Championship "Most valuable player"
- 2015 Asian Championship "Best outside spiker"
- 2015 FIVB World Cup "Most valuable player"
- 2016 Olympic Games "Most valuable player"
- 2016 Olympic Games "Best outside spiker"
- 2016 FIVB Club World Championship "Best outside spiker"
- 2016–17 Turkish League Regular Season "Best outside spiker"
- 2016–17 CEV Champions League "Most valuable player"
- 2017 FIVB Club World Championship "Best outside spiker"
- 2017 FIVB Club World Championship "Most valuable player"
- 2017 FIVB World Grand Prix "Best outside spiker"
- 2017 FIVB World Grand Champions Cup "Best outside spiker"
- 2017 FIVB World Grand Champions Cup "Most valuable player"
- 2017–18 Turkish Cup "Most valuable player"
- 2017–18 Turkish Volleyball League "Most valuable player"
- 2017–18 CEV Champions League "Best outside spikers"
- 2018 FIVB Volleyball Nations League "Best outside spiker"
- 2018 FIVB World Championship "Best outside spiker"
- 2018 FIVB Club World Championship "Best outside spiker"
- 2018 FIVB Club World Championship "Most valuable player"
- 2018–19 Turkish Volleyball League "Most valuable player"
- 2019 FIVB World Cup "Most valuable player"
- 2019 FIVB World Cup "Best Outsider Spiker"
- 2019–20 Chinese Volleyball League "Most valuable player"
- 2019–20 Chinese Volleyball League "Best outside spiker"
- 2020–21 Chinese Volleyball League "Most valuable player"
- 2024 FIVB Club World Championship "Best Outsider Spiker"

=== Other Achievements ===
- Xinhua News Agency's Top Ten Chinese Athletes of the Year: 2014, 2015, 2016, 2017, 2018
- 2016 CCTV Sports Personality of the Year: Best Female Athlete

== Film ==
- Leap (2020) – as Zhu Ting

Olympic Games
Preceded by Lei Sheng	Flagbearer for China (with Zhao Shuai); Tokyo 2020	Succeeded by Feng Yu & Ma Long
Awards
Preceded by (Thailand) Wilavan Apinyapong	Most Valuable Player of Asian Championship; 2015	Succeeded by (Japan) Risa Shinnabe
Preceded by (Italy) Carolina Costagrande	Most Valuable Player of World Cup; 2015; 2019	Succeeded by Incumbent
Preceded by (Serbia) Brankica Mihajlović (Russia) Tatiana Kosheleva	Best Outside Spiker of World Cup; 2019 (with (United States) Kelsey Robinson)	Succeeded by Incumbent
Preceded by (South Korea) Kim Yeon-koung	Most Valuable Player of Olympic Games; 2016	Succeeded by (United States) Jordan Larson
Preceded by (Italy) Francesca Piccinini	Most Valuable Player of CEV Champions League; 2016–2017	Succeeded by (Turkey) Gözde Kırdar Sonsırma
Preceded by (Serbia) Tijana Boskovic	Most Valuable Player of FIVB Club World Championship; 2017; 2018	Succeeded by (Italy) Paola Egonu
Preceded by (Brazil) Fabiana Claudino	Most Valuable Player of World Grand Champions Cup; 2017	Succeeded by Incumbent
Preceded by First Award	Best Outside Spiker of Olympic Games; 2016 (with (Serbia) Brankica Mihajlović)	Succeeded by (United States) Jordan Larson and (United States) Michelle Bartsch-Hackley
Preceded by (Russia) Tatiana Kosheleva and (Brazil) Fernanda Garay	Best Outside Spiker of FIVB Club World Championship; 2016 (with (Russia) Tatiana Kosheleva); 2017 (with (Brazil) Gabriela Guimarães); 2018 (with (Brazil) Gabriela Guimarães)	Succeeded by (South Korea) Kim Yeon-koung and (United States) Kimberly Hill
Preceded by First Award - (Brazil) Sheilla Castro and (United States) Kimberly Hill	Best Outside Spiker of FIVB World Grand Prix; 2013 (with (Serbia) Brankica Mihajlović); 2017 (with (Brazil) Natália Pereira)	Succeeded by (China) Liu Xiaotong and (Japan) Miyu Nagaoka - -
Preceded by First Award	Best Outside Spiker of World Championship; 2014 (with (United States) Kimberly Hill); 2018 (with (Italy) Miriam Sylla)	Succeeded by (Brazil) Gabriela Guimarães and (Italy) Miriam Sylla
Preceded by (United States) Kimberly Hill and (United States) Kelsey Robinson	Best Outside Spiker of CEV Champions League; 2017–2018 (with (United States) Kimberly Hill)	Succeeded by (Italy) Paola Egonu
Preceded by (Japan) Saori Sakoda and (Thailand) Onuma Sittirak	Best Outside Spiker of World Grand Champions Cup; 2017 (with (United States) Jordan Larson)	Succeeded by Incumbent
Preceded by –	Best Outside Spiker of FIVB Nations League; 2018 (with (United States) Michelle Bartsch-Hackley)	Succeeded by (Brazil) Gabriela Guimarães and (China) Liu Yanhan
