= 2018 FIVB Volleyball Women's Club World Championship =

World Club Volleyball

2018 Women's Club World Championship

Tournament details
- Host country: China
- City: Shaoxing
- Dates: 4–9 December
- Teams: 8 (from 3 confederations)
- Venue: 1 (in 1 host city)

Final positions
- Champions: (Turkey) Vakıfbank İstanbul (3rd title)
- Runners-up: (Brazil) Minas Tênis Clube
- Third place: (Turkey) Eczacıbaşı VitrA İstanbul
- Fourth place: (Brazil) Praia Clube

Tournament awards
- MVP: (China) Zhu Ting
- Best Setter: (Brazil) Macris Carneiro
- Best OH: (Brazil) Gabriela Guimarães (China) Zhu Ting
- Best MB: (Brazil) Mayany de Souza (Serbia) Milena Rašić
- Best OPP: (Serbia) Tijana Bošković
- Best Libero: (Turkey) Gizem Örge

Tournament statistics
- Matches played: 20

The 2018 FIVB Women's Club World Championship was the 12th edition of the tournament. It was held in Shaoxing, China from 4 to 9 December. Eight teams will compete in the tournament, including four wild cards.

== Qualification ==
Team	Qualified as
(China) Zhejiang WVC	Hosts
(Thailand) Supreme Chonburi	2017 Asian Champions
(Turkey) Vakıfbank İstanbul	2017–18 European Champions
(Brazil) Minas Tênis Clube	2018 South American Champions
(Turkey) Eczacıbaşı VitrA İstanbul	Wild Card
(France) Volero Le Cannet	Wild Card
(Brazil) Praia Clube	Wild Card
(Kazakhstan) Altay VC	Wild Card

== Pools composition ==
Pool A	Pool B
(Turkey) Vakıfbank İstanbul	(Turkey) Eczacıbaşı VitrA İstanbul
(Brazil) Minas Tênis Clube	(Brazil) Praia Clube
(China) Zhejiang WVC	(Thailand) Supreme Chonburi
(France) Volero Le Cannet	(Kazakhstan) Altay VC

== Venue ==
All rounds
Shaoxing, China
Shaoxing Olympic Sports Center

== Pool standing procedure ==
1. Number of matches won
2. Match points
3. Sets ratio
4. Points ratio
5. If the tie continues as per the point ratio between two teams, the priority will be given to the team which won the last match between them. When the tie in points ratio is between three or more teams, a new classification of these teams in the terms of points 1, 2 and 3 will be made taking into consideration only the matches in which they were opposed to each other.

Match won 3–0 or 3–1: 3 match points for the winner, 0 match points for the loser
Match won 3–2: 2 match points for the winner, 1 match point for the loser

== Preliminary round ==
- All times are China Standard Time (UTC+08:00).

Qualified for the Semifinals
Qualified for the

=== Pool A ===
Pos	Team	Pld	W	L	Pts	SW	SL	SR	SPW	SPL	SPR	Qualification
1	(Turkey) Vakıfbank İstanbul	3	3	0	9	9	0	MAX	230	168	1.369	Semifinals
2	(Brazil) Minas Tênis Clube	3	2	1	5	6	6	1.000	265	243	1.091	Semifinals
3	(China) Zhejiang WVC	3	1	2	2	4	8	0.500	211	278	0.759	Classification 5th–8th
4	(France) Volero Le Cannet	3	0	3	2	4	9	0.444	260	277	0.939	Classification 5th–8th

Date	Time		Score		Set 1	Set 2	Set 3	Set 4	Set 5	Total	Report
4 Dec	14:00	Minas Tênis Clube (Brazil)	3–2	(France) Volero Le Cannet	17–25	25–20	25–16	17–25	16–14	100–100	P2
4 Dec	20:00	Zhejiang WVC (China)	0–3	(Turkey) Vakıfbank İstanbul	20–25	13–25	13–25			46–75	P2
5 Dec	14:00	Vakıfbank İstanbul (Turkey)	3–0	(France) Volero Le Cannet	25–21	25–15	25–17			75–53	P2
5 Dec	20:00	Zhejiang WVC (China)	1–3	(Brazil) Minas Tênis Clube	11–25	25–21	10–25	17–25		63–96	P2
7 Dec	17:00	Vakıfbank İstanbul (Turkey)	3–0	(Brazil) Minas Tênis Clube	25–23	30–28	25–18			80–69	P2
7 Dec	20:00	Zhejiang WVC (China)	3–2	(France) Volero Le Cannet	16–25	25–19	19–25	26–24	16–14	102–107	P2

=== Pool B ===
Pos	Team	Pld	W	L	Pts	SW	SL	SR	SPW	SPL	SPR	Qualification
1	(Turkey) Eczacıbaşı VitrA İstanbul	3	3	0	9	9	1	9.000	250	159	1.572	Semifinals
2	(Brazil) Praia Clube	3	2	1	6	7	3	2.333	230	199	1.156	Semifinals
3	(Thailand) Supreme Chonburi	3	1	2	3	3	7	0.429	187	235	0.796	
4	(Kazakhstan) Altay VC	3	0	3	0	1	9	0.111	168	242	0.694	

Date	Time		Score		Set 1	Set 2	Set 3	Set 4	Set 5	Total	Report
4 Dec	10:00	Supreme Chonburi (Thailand)	0–3	(Brazil) Praia Clube	22–25	16–25	14–25			52–75	P2
4 Dec	17:00	Eczacıbaşı VitrA İstanbul (Turkey)	3–0	(Kazakhstan) Altay VC	25–10	25–11	25–15			75–36	P2
5 Dec	10:00	Praia Clube (Brazil)	3–0	(Kazakhstan) Altay VC	25–14	25–16	25–17			75–47	P2
5 Dec	17:00	Supreme Chonburi (Thailand)	0–3	(Turkey) Eczacıbaşı VitrA İstanbul	15–25	11–25	17–25			43–75	P2
7 Dec	10:00	Supreme Chonburi (Thailand)	3–1	(Kazakhstan) Altay VC	25–23	25–20	17–25	25–17		92–85	P2
7 Dec	14:00	Praia Clube (Brazil)	1–3	(Turkey) Eczacıbaşı VitrA İstanbul	27–25	21–25	11–25	21–25		80–100	P2

== Classification round ==
- All times are China Standard Time (UTC+08:00).

Classification 5th–8th
8 December
(China) Zhejiang WVC	2
(Kazakhstan) Altay VC	3
8 December
(Thailand) Supreme Chonburi	1
(France) Volero Le Cannet	3

5th place match
9 December
(Kazakhstan) Altay VC	3
(France) Volero Le Cannet	0
7th place match
9 December
(China) Zhejiang WVC	3
(Thailand) Supreme Chonburi	1

=== Classification 5th–8th ===
Date	Time		Score		Set 1	Set 2	Set 3	Set 4	Set 5	Total	Report
8 Dec	10:00	Zhejiang WVC (China)	2–3	(Kazakhstan) Altay VC	14–25	25–18	23–25	25–23	9–15	96–106	P2
8 Dec	14:00	Supreme Chonburi (Thailand)	1–3	(France) Volero Le Cannet	17–25	20–25	25–23	21–25		83–98	P2

=== 7th place match ===
Date	Time		Score		Set 1	Set 2	Set 3	Set 4	Set 5	Total	Report
9 Dec	10:00	Zhejiang WVC (China)	3–1	(Thailand) Supreme Chonburi	25–22	20–25	25–13	25–19		95–79	P2

=== 5th place match ===
Date	Time		Score		Set 1	Set 2	Set 3	Set 4	Set 5	Total	Report
9 Dec	14:00	Altay VC (Kazakhstan)	3–0	(France) Volero Le Cannet	26–24	25–14	25–13			76–51	P2

== Final round ==
- All times are China Standard Time (UTC+08:00).

Semifinals
8 December
(Turkey) Eczacıbaşı	2
(Brazil) Minas	3
8 December
(Turkey) Vakıfbank	3
(Brazil) Praia	1

Final
9 December
(Brazil) Minas	0
(Turkey) Vakıfbank	3
3rd place match
9 December
(Turkey) Eczacıbaşı	3
(Brazil) Praia	0

=== Semifinals ===
Date	Time		Score		Set 1	Set 2	Set 3	Set 4	Set 5	Total	Report
8 Dec	17:00	Eczacıbaşı VitrA İstanbul (Turkey)	2–3	(Brazil) Minas Tênis Clube	25–22	24–26	13–25	25–23	12–15	99–111	P2
8 Dec	20:00	Vakıfbank İstanbul (Turkey)	3–1	(Brazil) Praia Clube	25–21	25–21	22–25	25–18		97–85	P2

=== 3rd place match ===
Date	Time		Score		Set 1	Set 2	Set 3	Set 4	Set 5	Total	Report
9 Dec	17:00	Eczacıbaşı VitrA İstanbul (Turkey)	3–0	(Brazil) Praia Clube	25–16	25–18	25–19			75–53	P2

=== Final ===
Date	Time		Score		Set 1	Set 2	Set 3	Set 4	Set 5	Total	Report
9 Dec	20:00	Minas Tênis Clube (Brazil)	0–3	(Turkey) Vakıfbank İstanbul	23–25	21–25	19–25			63–75	P2

== Final standing ==
Rank	Team
1st place, gold medalist(s)	(Turkey) Vakıfbank İstanbul
2nd place, silver medalist(s)	(Brazil) Minas Tênis Clube
3rd place, bronze medalist(s)	(Turkey) Eczacıbaşı VitrA İstanbul
4	(Brazil) Praia Clube
5	(Kazakhstan) Altay VC
6	(France) Volero Le Cannet
7	(China) Zhejiang WVC
8	(Thailand) Supreme Chonburi

2018 Women's Club World Champions

3rd title

14–player roster
Gizem Örge, Cansu Özbay, Zhu Ting, Kübra Akman, Kelsey Robinson, Melis Gürkaynak (c), Ayça Aykaç, Lonneke Slöetjes, Buket Gülübay, Derya Cebecioğlu, Ebrar Karakurt, Milena Rašić, Tuğba Şenoğlu, Zehra Güneş
Head coach
Giovanni Guidetti

== Awards ==
- Most valuable player
  (China) Zhu Ting (Vakıfbank İstanbul)
- Best Opposite
  (Serbia) Tijana Bošković (Eczacıbaşı VitrA)
- Best outside spikers
  (Brazil) Gabriela Guimarães (Minas Tênis Clube)
  (China) Zhu Ting (Vakıfbank İstanbul)
- Best middle blockers
  (Brazil) Mayany de Souza (Minas Tênis Clube)
  (Serbia) Milena Rašić (Vakıfbank İstanbul)
- Best setter
  (Brazil) Macris Carneiro (Minas Tênis Clube)
- Best libero
  (Turkey) Gizem Örge (Vakıfbank İstanbul)

== See also ==
- 2018 FIVB Volleyball Men's Club World Championship
