= 2019 FIVB Volleyball Women's World Cup =

International volleyball competition

2019 Women's World Cup
ワールドカップバレーボール 日本 2019
- Official logo

Tournament details
- Host country: Japan
- Cities: Yokohama, Hamamatsu, Sapporo, Toyama, Osaka
- Dates: 14–29 September 2019
- Teams: 12 (from 5 confederations)
- Venues: 6 (in 5 host cities)

Final positions
- Champions: China (5th title)
- Runners-up: United States
- Third place: Russia
- Fourth place: Brazil

Tournament awards
- MVP: Zhu Ting
- Best Setter: Ding Xia
- Best OH: Zhu Ting; Kelsey Robinson
- Best MB: Irina Koroleva; Yan Ni
- Best OPP: Andrea Drews
- Best Libero: Wang Mengjie

Tournament statistics
- Matches played: 66
- Attendance: 219,802 (3,330 per match)
- Best scorer: Nataliya Goncharova; Ana Bjelica (209 points)
- Best spiker: Zhu Ting (54.64%)
- Best blocker: Irina Koroleva (1.00 Avg)
- Best server: Yamila Nizetich (0.53 Avg)
- Best setter: Miya Sato (6.83 Avg)
- Best digger: Kim Hae-ran (3.95 Avg)
- Best receiver: Kelsey Robinson (33.13%)

The 2019 FIVB Women's World Cup was the 13th edition of the event, contested by the senior women's national teams of the members of the Fédération Internationale de Volleyball (FIVB), the sport's global governing body. The tournament was held from 14 to 29 September 2019 in Japan. This was the first time that the FIVB did not distribute Olympics places since 1991 due to Japan hosting the 2020 Summer Olympics, but points for the FIVB World Rankings were given.

China won their historic fifth title, following titles from 1981, 1985, 2003, and 2015. China surpassed Cuba's earlier record of four titles in the history of the competition. Defending their title as the reigning champions in 2015, China reigned to sweep all eleven matches in Yokohama, Sapporo and Osaka. USA and Russia complete the 2019 podium as silver medallists and bronze medallists respectively.

Zhu Ting, outside hitter and captain of the Chinese women's volleyball national team, was selected as the World Cup's MVP, retaining her title from 2015. Zhu was joined in the Dream Team by three members of the gold medal-winning Chinese side – Yan Ni as Best Middle Blocker, Wang Mengjie as Best Libero, and Ding Xia as Best Setter. Two members of the USA squad that finished second to the Chinese Team also made the Dream Team, as Kelsey Robinson and Andrea Drews won the Best Outside Spiker and Best Opposite awards, respectively. Russia's Irina Koroleva also won as Best Blocker.

== Qualification ==
Twelve teams qualified for the competition as the top two teams of FIVB World Rankings of each continental federation on 1 January 2019. (except Japan who qualified as host, and Serbia who qualified as 2018 World Champion)

| Qualified to 2019 FIVB World Cup |
| Host and 2018 World champion |

| Rank | Team | WC 2015 | OG 2016 | WGP 2017 | WCH 2018 | Total | Note |
|---|---|---|---|---|---|---|---|
| 1 | Serbia | 90 | 90 | 42 | 100 | 322 | 2018 World champion |
| 2 | China | 100 | 100 | 40 | 80 | 320 | AVC first team |
| 3 | United States | 80 | 80 | 38 | 58 | 256 | NORCECA first team |
| 4 | Brazil | 50 | 50 | 50 | 50 | 200 | CSV first team |
| 5 | Russia | 70 | 50 | 28 | 50 | 198 | CEV first team |
| 6 | Japan | 50 | 50 | 32 | 58 | 190 | Host |
| 7 | Netherlands | 0 | 70 | 38 | 70 | 178 | CEV second team |
| 8 | Italy | 0 | 30 | 45 | 90 | 165 | |
| 9 | South Korea | 40 | 50 | 18 | 30 | 138 | AVC second team |
| 10 | Dominican Republic | 30 | 3 | 30 | 45 | 108 | NORCECA second team |
| 11 | Argentina | 25 | 30 | 8 | 30 | 93 | CSV second team |
| 12 | Turkey | 0 | 3 | 24 | 45 | 72 | |
| 13 | Puerto Rico | 0 | 20 | 14 | 36 | 70 | |
| 14 | Thailand | 0 | 3 | 26 | 36 | 65 | |
| 15 | Germany | 0 | 2 | 17 | 40 | 59 | |
| 16 | Bulgaria | 0 | 0 | 15 | 40 | 55 | |
| 17 | Cameroon | 0 | 20 | 2 | 25 | 47 | CAVB first team |
| 18 | Canada | 0 | 2 | 12 | 30 | 44 | |
| 19 | Belgium | 0 | 2 | 22 | 18 | 42 | |
| 20 | Kenya | 5 | 0 | 2 | 30 | 37 | CAVB second team |

=== Qualified teams ===
| Team | Confederation | Qualified as | Qualified on | Previous appearances | | |
| Team | Confederation | Qualified as | Qualified on | Total | First | Last |
|---|---|---|---|---|---|---|
| Japan | AVC | Host country | 31 January 2013 | 12 | 1973 | 2015 |
| Serbia | CEV | World champions | 20 October 2018 | 3 | 2007 | 2015 |
| China | AVC | World ranking for AVC | 1 January 2019 | 10 | 1977 | 2015 |
| South Korea | AVC | World ranking for AVC | 1 January 2019 | 12 | 1973 | 2015 |
| Cameroon | CAVB | World ranking for CAVB | 1 January 2019 | 0 | – | – |
| Kenya | CAVB | World ranking for CAVB | 1 January 2019 | 5 | 1991 | 2015 |
| Russia^{1} | CEV | World ranking for CEV | 1 January 2019 | 8 | 1973 | 2015 |
| Netherlands | CEV | World ranking for CEV | 1 January 2019 | 1 | 1995 | 1995 |
| Brazil | CSV | World ranking for CSV | 1 January 2019 | 9 | 1973 | 2011 |
| Argentina | CSV | World ranking for CSV | 1 January 2019 | 5 | 1973 | 2015 |
| United States | NORCECA | World ranking for NORCECA | 1 January 2019 | 10 | 1973 | 2015 |
| Dominican Republic | NORCECA | World ranking for NORCECA | 1 January 2019 | 4 | 2003 | 2015 |

Notes
^{1} Competed as Soviet Union from 1973 to 1991; 3rd appearance as Russia.

== Squads ==
=== Coaches ===
- Oldest coach: (Brazil) José Roberto Guimarães – 65 years and 44 days in the first game against Serbia.
- Youngest coach: (Netherlands) Jamie Morrison – 38 years and 306 days in the first game against Argentina.

=== Players ===
- Appearance record: (Brazil) Fabiana Claudino, (Dominican Republic) Prisilla Altagracia Rivera Brens, (Kenya) Janet Wanja, Mercy Moim, and (South Korea) Kim Yeon-koung participated in the World Cup four times.
- Oldest player: At 38 years and 38 days, (Dominican Republic) Annerys Vargas is the oldest player ever to be nominated in the tournament.
- Youngest player: (Serbia) Bojana Gočanin is the youngest player at the age of 16 years and 354 days.
- Tallest player: At 2.01 m, (China) Yuan Xinyue and (Dominican Republic) Brayelin Martínez are the tallest players ever to be nominated in the tournament.
- Shortest player: At 1.60 m, (Brazil) Léia Silva is the shortest player ever to be nominated in the tournament.

== Venues ==
| Site | First round | Second round | Third round | 2019 FIVB Volleyball Women's World Cup is located in Japan |
| A | Yokohama | Sapporo | Osaka | 2019 FIVB Volleyball Women's World Cup is located in Japan |
| A | Yokohama Arena | Hokkaido Prefectural Sports Center | Osaka Municipal Central Gymnasium (Maruzen Intec Arena Osaka) | 2019 FIVB Volleyball Women's World Cup is located in Japan |
| A | Capacity: 12,000 | Capacity: 7,000 | Capacity: 8,000 | 2019 FIVB Volleyball Women's World Cup is located in Japan |
| B | Hamamatsu | Toyama | Osaka | 2019 FIVB Volleyball Women's World Cup is located in Japan |
| B | Hamamatsu Arena | Toyama City Gymnasium | Osaka Prefectural Gymnasium (Edition Arena Osaka) | 2019 FIVB Volleyball Women's World Cup is located in Japan |
| B | Capacity: 5,000 | Capacity: 5,000 | Capacity: 5,000 | 2019 FIVB Volleyball Women's World Cup is located in Japan |

== Format ==
| Group 1 | Group 2 |
|---|---|
| Japan (Host) | Serbia (1) |
| China (2) | United States (3) |
| Russia (5) | Brazil (4) |
| South Korea (9) | Netherlands (7) |
| Dominican Republic (10) | Argentina (11) |
| Cameroon (17) | Kenya (20) |

The competition system of the 2019 World Cup was the single Round-Robin system. Each team played once against each of the 11 remaining teams.

The teams were divided into 2 pools of 6 teams each. In round 1, total 30 matches in 5 days, each teams played against the other teams from the same pool. For rounds 2 and 3, total 36 matches in 6 days, each team played against the teams from another pool.

Numbers in brackets denoted the FIVB World Ranking as of 1 January 2019 except the hosts who ranked 6th.

== Pool standing procedure ==
1. Total number of victories (matches won, matches lost)
2. In the event of a tie, the following first tiebreaker will apply: The teams will be ranked by the most point gained per match as follows:
  - Match won 3–0 or 3–1: 3 points for the winner, 0 points for the loser
  - Match won 3–2: 2 points for the winner, 1 point for the loser
  - Match forfeited: 3 points for the winner, 0 points (0–25, 0–25, 0–25) for the loser
3. If teams are still tied after examining the number of victories and points gained, then the FIVB will examine the results in order to break the tie in the following order:
  - Set quotient: if two or more teams are tied on the number of points gained, they will be ranked by the quotient resulting from the division of the number of all set won by the number of all sets lost.
  - Points quotient: if the tie persists based on the set quotient, the teams will be ranked by the quotient resulting from the division of all points scored by the total of points lost during all sets.
  - If the tie persists based on the point quotient, the tie will be broken based on the team that won the match of the Round Robin Phase between the tied teams. When the tie in point quotient is between three or more teams, these teams ranked taking into consideration only the matches involving the teams in question.

== Results ==
| Pos | Team | Pld | W | L | Pts | SW | SL | SR | SPW | SPL | SPR |
|---|---|---|---|---|---|---|---|---|---|---|---|
| 1 | China | 11 | 11 | 0 | 32 | 33 | 3 | 11.000 | 881 | 627 | 1.405 |
| 2 | United States | 11 | 10 | 1 | 28 | 30 | 10 | 3.000 | 929 | 773 | 1.202 |
| 3 | Russia | 11 | 8 | 3 | 23 | 27 | 14 | 1.929 | 948 | 818 | 1.159 |
| 4 | Brazil | 11 | 7 | 4 | 21 | 24 | 16 | 1.500 | 922 | 832 | 1.108 |
| 5 | Japan | 11 | 6 | 5 | 19 | 23 | 19 | 1.211 | 918 | 899 | 1.021 |
| 6 | South Korea | 11 | 6 | 5 | 18 | 21 | 19 | 1.105 | 898 | 888 | 1.011 |
| 7 | Dominican Republic | 11 | 6 | 5 | 17 | 22 | 21 | 1.048 | 933 | 949 | 0.983 |
| 8 | Netherlands | 11 | 5 | 6 | 17 | 21 | 19 | 1.105 | 890 | 865 | 1.029 |
| 9 | Serbia | 11 | 4 | 7 | 13 | 20 | 24 | 0.833 | 927 | 954 | 0.972 |
| 10 | Argentina | 11 | 2 | 9 | 5 | 9 | 29 | 0.310 | 736 | 890 | 0.827 |
| 11 | Kenya | 11 | 1 | 10 | 3 | 3 | 31 | 0.097 | 590 | 835 | 0.707 |
| 12 | Cameroon | 11 | 0 | 11 | 2 | 5 | 33 | 0.152 | 670 | 912 | 0.735 |

All times are Japan Standard Time (UTC+09:00).

=== First round ===
==== Site A ====
| Date | Time | | Score | | Set 1 | Set 2 | Set 3 | Set 4 | Set 5 | Total | Report |
|---|---|---|---|---|---|---|---|---|---|---|---|
| 14 Sep | 12:30 | Cameroon | 0–3 | Russia | 14–25 | 15–25 | 10–25 | | | 39–75 | Report |
| 14 Sep | 15:00 | China | 3–0 | South Korea | 25–21 | 25–15 | 25–14 | | | 75–50 | Report |
| 14 Sep | 19:20 | Dominican Republic | 1–3 | Japan | 21–25 | 11–25 | 26–24 | 14–25 | | 72–99 | Report |
| 15 Sep | 12:30 | Cameroon | 0–3 | China | 18–25 | 14–25 | 19–25 | | | 51–75 | Report |
| 15 Sep | 15:00 | South Korea | 1–3 | Dominican Republic | 17–25 | 26–24 | 23–25 | 23–25 | | 89–99 | Report |
| 15 Sep | 19:20 | Russia | 3–2 | Japan | 25–11 | 23–25 | 25–27 | 25–19 | 15–7 | 113–89 | Report |
| 16 Sep | 12:30 | Dominican Republic | 3–2 | Cameroon | 25–17 | 25–15 | 23–25 | 28–30 | 15–10 | 116–97 | Report |
| 16 Sep | 15:40 | China | 3–0 | Russia | 25–22 | 25–16 | 25–18 | | | 75–56 | Report |
| 16 Sep | 19:20 | Japan | 1–3 | South Korea | 25–23 | 19–25 | 22–25 | 25–27 | | 91–100 | Report |
| 18 Sep | 12:30 | Russia | 3–0 | South Korea | 25–18 | 29–27 | 25–12 | | | 79–57 | Report |
| 18 Sep | 15:00 | China | 3–0 | Dominican Republic | 25–19 | 25–21 | 25–19 | | | 75–59 | Report |
| 18 Sep | 19:20 | Cameroon | 0–3 | Japan | 17–25 | 17–25 | 20–25 | | | 54–75 | Report |
| 19 Sep | 12:30 | Dominican Republic | 2–3 | Russia | 16–25 | 23–25 | 25–23 | 25–23 | 5–15 | 94–111 | Report |
| 19 Sep | 15:00 | South Korea | 3–0 | Cameroon | 25–21 | 25–18 | 25–18 | | | 75–57 | Report |
| 19 Sep | 19:20 | Japan | 0–3 | China | 17–25 | 10–25 | 17–25 | | | 44–75 | Report |

==== Site B ====
| Date | Time | | Score | | Set 1 | Set 2 | Set 3 | Set 4 | Set 5 | Total | Report |
|---|---|---|---|---|---|---|---|---|---|---|---|
| 14 Sep | 11:00 | United States | 3–0 | Kenya | 25–14 | 25–20 | 25–14 | | | 75–48 | Report |
| 14 Sep | 14:00 | Argentina | 0–3 | Netherlands | 16–25 | 17–25 | 19–25 | | | 52–75 | Report |
| 14 Sep | 17:00 | Serbia | 2–3 | Brazil | 20–25 | 25–23 | 18–25 | 25–22 | 12–15 | 100–110 | Report |
| 15 Sep | 11:00 | Kenya | 0–3 | Netherlands | 12–25 | 19–25 | 17–25 | | | 48–75 | Report |
| 15 Sep | 14:00 | United States | 3–1 | Serbia | 23–25 | 25–17 | 25–16 | 25–15 | | 98–73 | Report |
| 15 Sep | 17:00 | Brazil | 3–0 | Argentina | 25–17 | 25–19 | 25–16 | | | 75–52 | Report |
| 16 Sep | 11:00 | Serbia | 3–0 | Kenya | 25–13 | 25–11 | 25–17 | | | 75–41 | Report |
| 16 Sep | 14:00 | Argentina | 1–3 | United States | 21–25 | 18–25 | 25–18 | 11–25 | | 75–93 | Report |
| 16 Sep | 17:00 | Netherlands | 3–0 | Brazil | 25–23 | 25–21 | 25–22 | | | 75–66 | Report |
| 18 Sep | 11:00 | Serbia | 3–1 | Argentina | 25–15 | 23–25 | 25–23 | 25–23 | | 98–86 | Report |
| 18 Sep | 14:00 | United States | 3–0 | Netherlands | 25–23 | 25–18 | 25–19 | | | 75–60 | Report |
| 18 Sep | 18:00 | Kenya | 0–3 | Brazil | 20–25 | 17–25 | 14–25 | | | 51–75 | Report |
| 19 Sep | 11:00 | Netherlands | 2–3 | Serbia | 25–18 | 25–23 | 19–25 | 24–26 | 9–15 | 102–107 | Report |
| 19 Sep | 14:00 | Argentina | 3–0 | Kenya | 25–14 | 25–19 | 25–15 | | | 75–48 | Report |
| 19 Sep | 18:00 | Brazil | 0–3 | United States | 22–25 | 18–25 | 19–25 | | | 59–75 | Report |

=== Second round ===
==== Site A ====
| Date | Time | | Score | | Set 1 | Set 2 | Set 3 | Set 4 | Set 5 | Total | Report |
|---|---|---|---|---|---|---|---|---|---|---|---|
| 22 Sep | 12:30 | Dominican Republic | 3–0 | Kenya | 25–17 | 25–19 | 25–19 | | | 75–55 | Report |
| 22 Sep | 15:00 | China | 3–2 | Brazil | 25–23 | 23–25 | 22–25 | 25–19 | 15–9 | 110–101 | Report |
| 22 Sep | 19:20 | Japan | 2–3 | United States | 24–26 | 25–22 | 21–25 | 25–23 | 8–15 | 103–111 | Report |
| 23 Sep | 12:30 | Dominican Republic | 1–3 | Brazil | 16–25 | 25–23 | 19–25 | 22–25 | | 82–98 | Report |
| 23 Sep | 15:00 | China | 3–0 | United States | 25–16 | 25–17 | 25–22 | | | 75–55 | Report |
| 23 Sep | 19:20 | Japan | 3–0 | Kenya | 25–18 | 25–22 | 25–20 | | | 75–60 | Report |
| 24 Sep | 12:30 | Dominican Republic | 0–3 | United States | 22–25 | 23–25 | 9–25 | | | 54–75 | Report |
| 24 Sep | 15:00 | China | 3–0 | Kenya | 25–12 | 25–12 | 25–14 | | | 75–38 | Report |
| 24 Sep | 19:20 | Japan | 0–3 | Brazil | 14–25 | 21–25 | 23–25 | | | 58–75 | Report |

==== Site B ====
| Date | Time | | Score | | Set 1 | Set 2 | Set 3 | Set 4 | Set 5 | Total | Report |
|---|---|---|---|---|---|---|---|---|---|---|---|
| 22 Sep | 11:00 | South Korea | 3–1 | Argentina | 25–19 | 21–25 | 25–19 | 25–9 | | 96–72 | Report |
| 22 Sep | 14:00 | Cameroon | 0–3 | Netherlands | 15–25 | 14–25 | 18–25 | | | 47–75 | Report |
| 22 Sep | 17:00 | Russia | 3–1 | Serbia | 25–16 | 20–25 | 25–23 | 25–16 | | 95–80 | Report |
| 23 Sep | 11:00 | South Korea | 1–3 | Netherlands | 19–25 | 25–21 | 22–25 | 23–25 | | 89–96 | Report |
| 23 Sep | 14:00 | Cameroon | 0–3 | Serbia | 22–25 | 14–25 | 17–25 | | | 53–75 | Report |
| 23 Sep | 17:00 | Russia | 3–0 | Argentina | 25–21 | 25–16 | 25–21 | | | 75–58 | Report |
| 24 Sep | 11:00 | South Korea | 3–1 | Serbia | 25–21 | 25–18 | 15–25 | 25–23 | | 90–87 | Report |
| 24 Sep | 14:00 | Cameroon | 2–3 | Argentina | 25–21 | 25–20 | 20–25 | 20–25 | 12–15 | 102–106 | Report |
| 24 Sep | 18:00 | Russia | 3–0 | Netherlands | 26–24 | 25–18 | 25–20 | | | 76–62 | Report |

=== Third round ===
==== Site A ====
| Date | Time | | Score | | Set 1 | Set 2 | Set 3 | Set 4 | Set 5 | Total | Report |
|---|---|---|---|---|---|---|---|---|---|---|---|
| 27 Sep | 12:30 | Dominican Republic | 3–0 | Argentina | 25–16 | 25–23 | 27–25 | | | 77–64 | Report |
| 27 Sep | 15:00 | China | 3–1 | Netherlands | 25–19 | 25–16 | 21–25 | 25–19 | | 96–79 | Report |
| 27 Sep | 19:20 | Japan | 3–2 | Serbia | 21–25 | 21–25 | 25–20 | 25–20 | 15–6 | 107–96 | Report |
| 28 Sep | 12:30 | Dominican Republic | 3–2 | Netherlands | 25–23 | 25–22 | 25–27 | 18–25 | 15–4 | 108–101 | Report |
| 28 Sep | 15:00 | China | 3–0 | Serbia | 25–14 | 25–21 | 25–16 | | | 75–51 | Report |
| 28 Sep | 19:20 | Japan | 3–0 | Argentina | 26–24 | 25–15 | 25–14 | | | 76–53 | Report |
| 29 Sep | 12:30 | Dominican Republic | 3–1 | Serbia | 25–22 | 25–21 | 22–25 | 25–17 | | 97–85 | Report |
| 29 Sep | 15:00 | China | 3–0 | Argentina | 25–17 | 25–14 | 25–12 | | | 75–43 | Report |
| 29 Sep | 19:20 | Japan | 3–1 | Netherlands | 25–18 | 27–25 | 24–26 | 25–21 | | 101–90 | Report |

==== Site B ====
| Date | Time | | Score | | Set 1 | Set 2 | Set 3 | Set 4 | Set 5 | Total | Report |
|---|---|---|---|---|---|---|---|---|---|---|---|
| 27 Sep | 11:00 | South Korea | 3–0 | Kenya | 25–15 | 25–16 | 25–21 | | | 75–52 | Report |
| 27 Sep | 14:00 | Cameroon | 0–3 | Brazil | 11–25 | 17–25 | 18–25 | | | 46–75 | Report |
| 27 Sep | 18:00 | Russia | 2–3 | United States | 26–24 | 22–25 | 22–25 | 25–17 | 8–15 | 103–106 | Report |
| 28 Sep | 11:00 | South Korea | 3–1 | Brazil | 25–23 | 18–25 | 25–20 | 25–21 | | 93–89 | Report |
| 28 Sep | 14:00 | Cameroon | 0–3 | United States | 19–25 | 15–25 | 5–25 | | | 39–75 | Report |
| 28 Sep | 17:00 | Russia | 3–0 | Kenya | 25–16 | 25–21 | 25–22 | | | 75–59 | Report |
| 29 Sep | 11:00 | South Korea | 1–3 | United States | 21–25 | 16–25 | 25–16 | 22–25 | | 84–91 | Report |
| 29 Sep | 14:00 | Russia | 1–3 | Brazil | 26–28 | 20–25 | 25–21 | 19–25 | | 90–99 | Report |
| 29 Sep | 17:00 | Cameroon | 1–3 | Kenya | 15–25 | 24–26 | 25–14 | 21–25 | | 85–90 | Report |

== Final standing ==
| Rank | Team |
|---|---|
| 1st place, gold medalist(s) | China |
| 2nd place, silver medalist(s) | United States |
| 3rd place, bronze medalist(s) | Russia |
| 4 | Brazil |
| 5 | Japan |
| 6 | South Korea |
| 7 | Dominican Republic |
| 8 | Netherlands |
| 9 | Serbia |
| 10 | Argentina |
| 11 | Kenya |
| 12 | Cameroon |

2019 Women's World Cup champions

China
5th title

Team roster
Yuan Xinyue, Zhu Ting (c), Yang Hanyu, Gong Xiangyu, Wang Yuanyuan, Zeng Chunlei, Zhang Changning, Liu Xiaotong, Yao Di, Li Yingying, Zheng Yixin, Lin Li, Ding Xia, Yan Ni, Wang Mengjie, Liu Yanhan
Head coach
Lang Ping

== Awards ==
- Most valuable player
  (China) Zhu Ting
- Best setter
  (China) Ding Xia
- Best outside hitters
  (China) Zhu Ting
  (United States) Kelsey Robinson
- Best middle blockers
  (Russia) Irina Koroleva
  (China) Yan Ni
- Best opposite hitter
  (United States) Andrea Drews
- Best libero
  (China) Wang Mengjie

== Statistics leaders ==
The statistics of each group follows the vis reports P2 and P3. The statistics include 6 volleyball skills; serve, reception, set, spike, block, and dig. The table below shows the top 5 ranked players in each skill plus top scorers as of 29 September 2019.

=== Best Scorers ===
Best scorers determined by scored points from attack, block and serve.

| | Player | Attacks | Blocks | Serves | Total |
|---|---|---|---|---|---|
| 1 | (Russia) Nataliya Goncharova | 184 | 20 | 5 | 209 |
| 1 | (Serbia) Ana Bjelica | 187 | 13 | 9 | 209 |
| 3 | (Dominican Republic) Brayelin Martínez | 181 | 13 | 3 | 197 |
| 4 | (China) Zhu Ting | 153 | 16 | 9 | 178 |
| 5 | (Netherlands) Lonneke Slöetjes | 156 | 13 | 2 | 171 |

=== Best Attackers ===
Best attackers determined by successful attacks in percentage.

| | Player | Spikes | Faults | Shots | Total | % |
|---|---|---|---|---|---|---|
| 1 | (China) Zhu Ting | 153 | 22 | 105 | 280 | 54.64 |
| 2 | (China) Zhang Changning | 97 | 28 | 76 | 201 | 48.26 |
| 3 | (United States) Andrea Drews | 105 | 29 | 91 | 225 | 46.67 |
| 4 | (Russia) Ksenia Parubets | 113 | 38 | 98 | 249 | 45.38 |
| 5 | (Dominican Republic) Brayelin Martínez | 181 | 41 | 177 | 399 | 45.36 |

=== Best Blockers ===
Best blockers determined by the average of stuff blocks per set.

| | Player | Blocks | Faults | Rebounds | Total | Avg |
|---|---|---|---|---|---|---|
| 1 | (Russia) Irina Koroleva | 41 | 61 | 70 | 172 | 1.00 |
| 2 | (China) Yan Ni | 34 | 26 | 59 | 119 | 0.94 |
| 3 | (Russia) Ekaterina Efimova | 33 | 29 | 60 | 122 | 0.80 |
| 4 | (United States) Chiaka Ogbogu | 32 | 40 | 72 | 144 | 0.80 |
| 5 | (Serbia) Maja Aleksić | 30 | 38 | 82 | 150 | 0.68 |

=== Best Servers ===
Best servers determined by the average of aces per set.

| | Player | Aces | Faults | Hits | Total | Avg |
|---|---|---|---|---|---|---|
| 1 | (Argentina) Yamila Nizetich | 20 | 13 | 79 | 112 | 0.53 |
| 2 | (Dominican Republic) Bethania de la Cruz | 18 | 14 | 118 | 150 | 0.42 |
| 3 | (Netherlands) Juliët Lohuis | 12 | 16 | 70 | 98 | 0.30 |
| 4 | (China) Zhang Changning | 10 | 10 | 74 | 94 | 0.28 |
| 4 | (China) Ding Xia | 10 | 6 | 105 | 121 | 0.28 |

=== Best Setters ===
Best setters determined by the average of running sets per set.

| | Player | Running | Faults | Still | Total | Avg |
|---|---|---|---|---|---|---|
| 1 | (Japan) Miya Sato | 287 | 4 | 897 | 1188 | 6.83 |
| 2 | (Dominican Republic) Niverka Marte | 250 | 7 | 869 | 1126 | 5.81 |
| 3 | (Argentina) Victoria Mayer | 210 | 5 | 762 | 977 | 5.53 |
| 4 | (Brazil) Macris Carneiro | 219 | 7 | 579 | 805 | 5.48 |
| 5 | (China) Ding Xia | 192 | 5 | 497 | 694 | 5.33 |

=== Best Diggers ===
Best diggers determined by the average of successful digs per set.

| | Player | Digs | Faults | Receptions | Total | Avg |
|---|---|---|---|---|---|---|
| 1 | (South Korea) Kim Hae-ran | 158 | 26 | 15 | 199 | 3.95 |
| 2 | (Dominican Republic) Larysmer Martínez Caro | 169 | 41 | 35 | 245 | 3.93 |
| 3 | (Netherlands) Myrthe Schoot | 134 | 38 | 28 | 200 | 3.35 |
| 4 | (Serbia) Teodora Pušić | 139 | 38 | 36 | 213 | 3.16 |
| 5 | (Japan) Mako Kobata | 129 | 33 | 27 | 189 | 3.07 |

=== Best Receivers ===
Best receivers determined by efficient receptions in percentage.

| | Player | Excellents | Faults | Serve | Total | % |
|---|---|---|---|---|---|---|
| 1 | (United States) Kelsey Robinson | 60 | 5 | 101 | 166 | 33.13 |
| 2 | (Japan) Mako Kobata | 59 | 7 | 105 | 171 | 30.41 |
| 3 | (Brazil) Gabriela Guimarães | 78 | 7 | 156 | 241 | 29.46 |
| 4 | (China) Gong Xiangyu | 41 | 4 | 90 | 135 | 27.41 |
| 5 | (Japan) Yuki Ishii | 63 | 7 | 139 | 209 | 26.79 |
