= 2017 FIVB Volleyball Women's World Grand Champions Cup =

2017 Women's World Grand Champions Cup
- Logo of Japan 2017 WGCC

Tournament details
- Host country: Japan
- Dates: 5–10 September
- Teams: 6 (from 4 confederations)
- Venue: 2 (in 2 host cities)

Final positions
- Champions: China (2nd title)
- Runners-up: Brazil
- Third place: United States
- Fourth place: Russia

Tournament awards
- MVP: (China) Zhu Ting
- Best Setter: (Japan) Koyomi Tominaga
- Best OH: (China) Zhu Ting (United States) Jordan Larson
- Best MB: (Brazil) Ana Carolina da Silva (China) Yuan Xinyue
- Best OPP: (Brazil) Tandara Caixeta
- Best Libero: (Japan) Kotoe Inoue

Tournament statistics
- Matches played: 15
- Attendance: 72,250 (4,817 per match)

The 2017 FIVB Volleyball Women's World Grand Champions Cup was the 7th staging of the FIVB Volleyball World Grand Champions Cup, a quadrennial international women's volleyball tournament organized by the Fédération Internationale de Volleyball (FIVB). The tournament was held in Tokyo and Nagoya, Japan from 5 to 10 September 2017. 6 national teams from 4 confederations competed in the tournament.

China claimed their second title at the tournament with an unbeaten record. Brazil claimed the silver after a face-off in the final round with United States who finished third. Zhu Ting from China was elected the MVP.

== Qualification ==
The FIVB announced the best four ranked continents in the 2016 Olympic Games were eligible to participate in the tournament. Asia, Europe, North America, and South America confederations were eligible to send representatives. The representatives were determined by their continental ranking at the Olympic tournament. The four teams will join the host team and a wild card team which to compete for the World Grand Champion Cup title.

2017 FIVB Volleyball Women's World Grand Champions Cup

=== Qualified teams ===
The following teams qualified for the tournament.

Country	Confederation	Qualified as	Previous appearances		
Country	Confederation	Qualified as	Total	First	Last
Japan	AVC	Host nation	6	1993	2013
China	AVC	The first continental representative	4	1993	2005
Russia	CEV	The second continental representative	4	1993	2013
United States	NORCECA	The third continental representative	4	1993	2013
Brazil	CSV	The fourth continental representative	5	1997	2013
South Korea	AVC	Wild card	4	1997	2009

== Venues ==
Tokyo round	2017 FIVB Volleyball Women's World Grand Champions Cup is located in Japan	Nagoya round
Tokyo, Japan	2017 FIVB Volleyball Women's World Grand Champions Cup is located in Japan	Nagoya, Japan
Tokyo Metropolitan Gymnasium	2017 FIVB Volleyball Women's World Grand Champions Cup is located in Japan	Nippon Gaishi Hall
Capacity: 10,000	2017 FIVB Volleyball Women's World Grand Champions Cup is located in Japan	Capacity: 10,000

== Competition formula ==
The competition formula of the 2017 Women's World Grand Champions Cup was a single Round-Robin system. Each team played once against each of the five remaining teams. Points were accumulated during the whole tournament, and the final standing was determined by the total points gained.

== Match officials ==
Confederation	Referee	Matches
AVC	(Thailand) Nathanon Sowapark	M001, M005, M008, M012, M015
AVC	(Iran) Mohammad Shahmiri	M003, M004, M007, M011, M014
CEV	(Slovakia) Juraj Mokry	M001, M005, M008, M011, M014
CEV	(Italy) Daniele Rapisarda	M002, M006, M009, M010, M013
NORCECA	(United States) Patricia Rolf	M003, M004, M009, M010, M013
CSV	(Argentina) Hernan Gonzalo Casamiquela	M002, M006, M007, M012, M015

== Pool standing procedure ==
1. Number of matches won
2. Match points
3. Sets ratio
4. Points ratio
5. If the tie continues as per the point ratio between two teams, the priority will be given to the team which won the last match between them. When the tie in points ratio is between three or more teams, a new classification of these teams in the terms of points 1, 2 and 3 will be made taking into consideration only the matches in which they were opposed to each other.

Match won 3–0 or 3–1: 3 match points for the winner, 0 match points for the loser.
Match won 3–2: 2 match points for the winner, 1 match point for the loser.

== Results ==
- All times are Japan Standard Time (UTC+09:00).

Pos	Team	Pld	W	L	Pts	SW	SL	SR	SPW	SPL	SPR
1	China	5	5	0	14	15	4	3.750	454	343	1.324
2	Brazil	5	3	2	11	13	7	1.857	438	405	1.081
3	United States	5	3	2	7	10	10	1.000	431	434	0.993
4	Russia	5	2	3	7	9	10	0.900	411	427	0.963
5	Japan	5	2	3	6	10	11	0.909	462	471	0.981
6	South Korea	5	0	5	0	0	15	0.000	260	376	0.691

=== Tokyo round ===
Date	Time		Score		Set 1	Set 2	Set 3	Set 4	Set 5	Total	Report
5 Sep	12:40	Russia	1–3	Brazil	17–25	25–23	23–25	12–25		77–98	P2 P3
5 Sep	15:40	United States	1–3	China	25–18	18–25	14–25	17–25		74–93	P2 P3
5 Sep	19:15	Japan	3–0	South Korea	25–23	25–21	26–24			76–68	P2 P3
6 Sep	12:40	Brazil	2–3	China	20–25	12–25	25–20	25–23	17–19	99–112	P2 P3
6 Sep	15:40	South Korea	0–3	United States	22–25	20–25	16–25			58–75	P2 P3
6 Sep	19:15	Russia	3–1	Japan	22–25	25–18	25–22	28–26		100–91	P2 P3

=== Nagoya round ===
Date	Time		Score		Set 1	Set 2	Set 3	Set 4	Set 5	Total	Report
8 Sep	12:40	United States	3–2	Russia	23–25	25–21	19–25	25–21	15–9	107–101	P2 P3
8 Sep	15:40	China	3–0	South Korea	25–14	25–4	25–12			75–30	P2 P3
8 Sep	19:15	Japan	3–2	Brazil	25–18	25–27	25–15	16–25	15–6	106–91	P2 P3
9 Sep	12:40	Russia	0–3	China	20–25	18–25	20–25			58–75	P2 P3
9 Sep	15:40	Brazil	3–0	South Korea	25–15	25–10	25–23			75–48	P2 P3
9 Sep	19:15	Japan	2–3	United States	25–22	21–25	28–26	21–25	12–15	107–113	P2 P3
10 Sep	11:40	South Korea	0–3	Russia	19–25	16–25	21–25			56–75	P2 P3
10 Sep	14:40	United States	0–3	Brazil	20–25	23–25	19–25			62–75	P2 P3
10 Sep	18:15	China	3–1	Japan	25–22	24–26	25–18	25–16		99–82	P2 P3

== Final standing ==
Rank	Team
1st place, gold medalist(s)	China
2nd place, silver medalist(s)	Brazil
3rd place, bronze medalist(s)	United States
4	Russia
5	Japan
6	South Korea

2017 Women's World Grand Champions Cup champions

China
Second title

14–woman roster
Yuan Xinyue, Zhu Ting (c), Gong Xiangyu, Diao Linyu, Yao Di, Zhang Changning, Liu Xiaotong, Zheng Yixin, Wang Chenyue, Lin Li, Ding Xia, Wang Mengjie, Yan Ni, Zeng Chunlei
Head coach
An Jiajie

== Awards ==
- Most Valuable Player
  (China) Zhu Ting
- Best setter
  (Japan) Koyomi Tominaga
- Best outside spikers
  (China) Zhu Ting
  (United States) Jordan Larson
- Best middle blockers
  (Brazil) Ana Carolina da Silva
  (China) Yuan Xinyue
- Best opposite spiker
  (Brazil) Tandara Caixeta
- Best libero
  (Japan) Kotoe Inoue

== See also ==
- 2017 FIVB Volleyball Men's World Grand Champions Cup
