= Patricof =

Patricof is a surname. Notable people with the surname include:

- Alan Patricof (born 1934), American investor
- Jamie Patricof, American movie and television producer
- Jon Patricof (born 1973), American businessman, son of Alan and brother of Jamie
