= 2022 Athletes Unlimited Volleyball season =

2022 Athletes Unlimited Volleyball Season
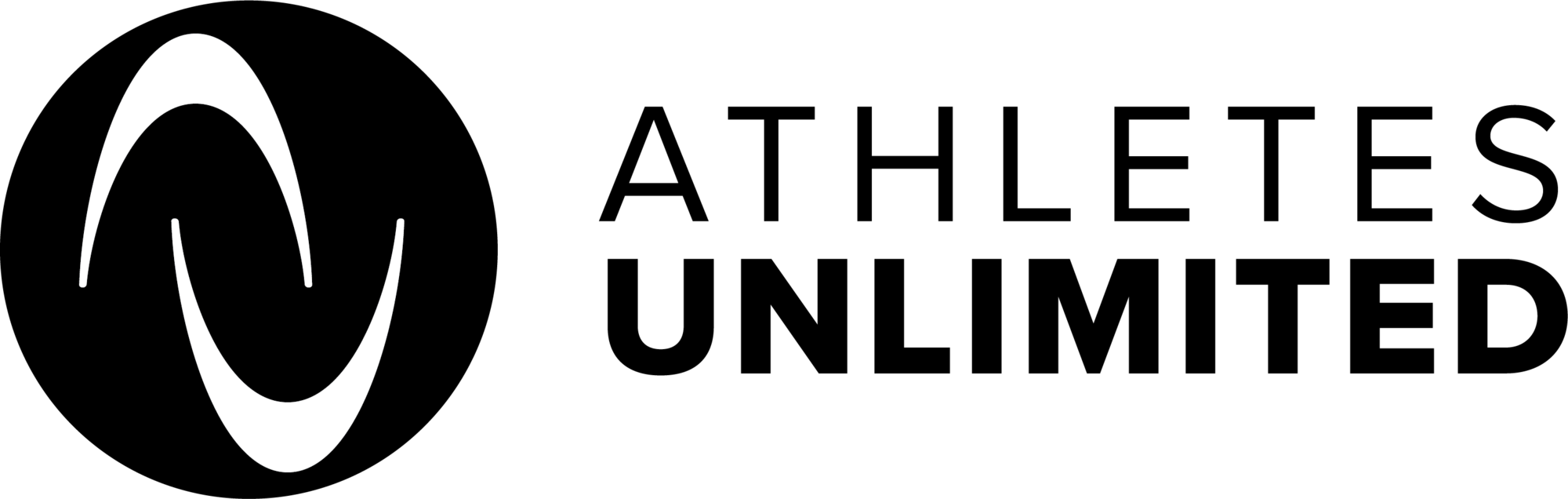
- Athletes Unlimited Logo

Tournament details
- Host country: United States
- City: Dallas
- Dates: March 16 – April 16
- Venue: 1 (in 1 host city)

Tournament awards
- MVP: (Dominican Republic) Bethania de la Cruz
- Best Setter: (Puerto Rico) Natalia Valentín-Anderson
- Best OH: (Dominican Republic) Bethania de la Cruz (United States) Dani Drews
- Best MB: (United States) Molly McCage (United States) Jenna Rosenthal
- Best OPP: (Brazil) Sheilla Castro
- Best Libero: (United States) Morgan Hentz

Tournament statistics
- Matches played: 30

The 2022 Athletes Unlimited Volleyball season was the Athletes Unlimited Volleyball's second season in existence. The season was played in Dallas, Texas and ran from March 16, 2022, to April 16, 2022.

Bethania de la Cruz was the overall season winner - finishing with 4,652 points.

== 2022 Roster ==
Name	Position	College	2021–22 Club
Ali Bastianelli	Middle Blocker	Illinois	(Puerto Rico) Atenienses De Manati
Amanda Benson	Libero	Oregon	
Tina Boe	Middle Blocker	Denver	(United States) Denver Pioneers
Taylor Bruns Tegenrot	Setter	South Carolina	(Sweden) Goteborg Volleybollklubb
Sheilla Castro	Outside hitter/Opposite		
Alisha Glass Childress	Setter	Penn State	
Naya Crittenden	Opposite	Oregon/Illinois	(Turkey) Sarıyer Belediyespor
Aury Cruz	Outside hitter	Florida	(Puerto Rico) Valencianas de Juncos
Bethania de la Cruz	Outside hitter		(Kazakhstan) Altay VC
Tori Dilfer	Setter	Louisville	(United States) Louisville Cardinals
Dani Drews	Outside Hitter	Utah	(Poland) KPS Chemik Police
Leah Edmond	Outside Hitter	Kentucky	(Puerto Rico) Valencianas de Juncos
Erin Fairs	Outside Hitter	USF/Kentucky	
Rachael Fara	Middle Blocker	Northwestern/Dayton/ Colorado	
Falyn Fonoimoana	Opposite	USC	
Taylor Fricano	Opposite	North Carolina	(Italy) Olimpia Teodora Ravenna
Morgan Hentz	Libero	Stanford	
Cassidy Lichtman	Outside hitter	Stanford	(United States) Athletes Unlimited
Hana Lishman	Libero	Pepperdine	
Carli Lloyd	Setter	California	(United States) Athletes Unlimited
Karsta Lowe	Opposite	UCLA	(Puerto Rico) Changas de Naranjito
Kalei Mau	Outside Hitter	Minnesota/Arizona	(United States) Athletes Unlimited
Molly McCage	Middle Blocker	Texas	(United States) Athletes Unlimited
Deja McClendon	Outside Hitter	Penn State	(United States) Athletes Unlimited
Sha'Dare McNeal	Opposite	Texas	
Taylor Morgan	Middle Blocker	Minnesota	(United States) Athletes Unlimited
Valerie Nichol	Setter	Purdue	(United States) Athletes Unlimited
Jamie Peterson	Outside Hitter	Dayton	(United States) Dayton Flyers
Jenna Rosenthal	Middle Blocker	Marquette	
Taylor Sandbothe	Middle Blocker	Ohio State	(Puerto Rico) Valencianas de Juncos
Ray Santos	Setter	Arkansas	(Puerto Rico) Pinkin de Corozal
Noami Santos-Lamb	Outside Hitter	Florida	(Puerto Rico) Changas de Naranjito
Lindsay Stalzer	Outside Hitter	Bradley	(Puerto Rico) Atenienses De Manati
Lauren Stivrins	Middle Blocker	Nebraska	(United States) Nebraska Cornhuskers
Ronika Stone	Middle Blocker	Oregon	(Puerto Rico) Pinkin de Corozal
Lianna Sybeldon	Middle Blocker	Washington	(United States) Athletes Unlimited
Nootsara Tomkom	Setter		(Thailand) Diamond Food
Natalia Valentín-Anderson	Setter	FIU	(Puerto Rico) Valencianas de Juncos
Madison Villines	Outside Hitter	Kansas	(Puerto Rico) Changas de Naranjito
Nomaris Vélez Agosto	Libero		(Puerto Rico) Changas de Naranjito
Emma Willis	Middle Blocker	Denver	
Erica Wilson	Opposite Hitter	Arizona State	(United States) Athletes Unlimited
Niki Withers	Opposite	Cal State Fullerton/USC	
Eri Xue	Middle Blocker	Long Beach State	(China) Liaoning Huajun

== Scoring system ==
Unlike traditional volleyball which is best-of-5 sets, matches in Athletes Unlimited always play three sets. A team does not necessarily have to win the majority or all of the sets as the winner is determined based on the final overall score. If the teams are tied after 3 sets, a tie breaking fourth set (referred to as the "Golden Set) is played. The Golden Set goes to 5 points and must win by two.

=== MVP Points ===
After each match, players and members of The Unlimited Club vote for three players who had standout performances. MVP points are awarded as follows:

- MVP 1: +60 points
- MVP 2: +40 points
- MVP 3: +20 points

=== Individual stats ===
In addition to team points and MVP points, players earn points based on their offensive and defensive performance.

The breakdown for individual points is as follows:

- Serving: Ace + 12, Error -8
- Service error (-8)
- Attack: Kill + 8, Error -12
- Set: Assist + 1, Error -12
- Dig: Dig + 5, No Errors
- Pass: Good pass + 2, Error -12
- Block: Stuff + 12, No Errors

=== Captains ===
At the conclusion of each week, the top four point scorers are named team captains. Each captain is assigned to a team color based on their standing. Captains then choose their team in a weekly draft.

- No. 1: Gold
- No. 2: Orange
- No. 3: Blue
- No. 4: Purple
- Week 1 Captains: Bethania de la Cruz, Aury Cruz, Karsta Lowe, and Deja McClendon
- Week 2 Captains: Dani Drews, Bethania de la Cruz, Natalia Valentín-Anderson, and Lauren Stivrins
- Week 3 Captains: Bethania de la Cruz, Karsta Lowe, Dani Drews, and Sheilla Castro
- Week 4 Captains: Dani Drews, Bethania de la Cruz, Sheilla Castro, and Natalia Valentín-Anderson
- Week 5 Captains: Bethania de la Cruz, Dani Drews, Natalia Valentín-Anderson, and Cassidy Lichtman

== Games ==
=== Week 1 ===
2022 Athletes Unlimited Season
Week 1

Date	Time (CDT)	Matchup			TV	Result	High kills	High blocks	High assists	High digs
Wednesday, March 16	5:00 PM	Team Lowe	vs	Team Cruz	YouTube	77–74 (27–25, 25–27, 25–22)	Karsta Lowe (22)	Ali Bastianelli (3)	Carli Lloyd (40)	Amanda Benson (19)
Wednesday, March 16	7:30 PM	Team de la Cruz	vs	Team McClendon	Bally Sports	68–59 (25–13, 18–25, 25–21)	Dani Drews (10)	Lauren Stivrins (4)	Natalia Valentín-Anderson (28)	Natalia Valentín-Anderson (16)
Friday, March 18	6:00 PM	Team McClendon	vs	Team Cruz	FS1	71–68 (25–17, 22–25, 24–26)	Aury Cruz (15)	Taylor Morgan; Molly McCage; Dani Drews (3)	Natalia Valentín-Anderson (35)	Morgan Hentz (18)
Friday, March 18	8:30 PM	Team Lowe	vs	Team de la Cruz	FS2	74–78 (24–26, 21–25, 29–27)	Karsta Lowe; Lindsay Stalzer; Bethania de la Cruz (13)	Lauren Stivrins (4)	Carli Lloyd (35)	Amanda Benson (17)
Saturday, March 19	6:00 PM	Team McClendon	vs	Team Lowe	FS2	76–58(25–23, 26–24, 25–11)	Dani Drews (16)	Rachael Fara (3)	Natalia Valentín-Anderson (43)	Carli Lloyd; Nomaris Velez Agosto (13)
Saturday, March 19	9:30 p.m.	Team Cruz	vs	Team de la Cruz	Bally Sports	69–71 (19–25, 25–23, 25–23)	Kalei Mau; Falyn Fonoimoana; Madison Villindes (10)	Molly McCage (4)	Nootsara Tomkom (28)	Morgan Hentz (16)

=== Week 2 ===
2022 Athletes Unlimited Season
Week 2

Date	Time (CDT)	Matchup			TV	Result	High kills	High blocks	High assists	High digs
Wednesday, March 23	6:30 p.m.	Natalia Valentín-Anderson	vs	Team de la Cruz	YouTube	75–80 (23–25, 20–25, 32–30)	Bethania de la Cruz (22)	Ali Bastianelli (5)	Nootsara Tomkom (45)	Nomaris Velez Agosto; Bethania de la Cruz (18)
Wednesday, March 23	7:30 PM	Team Drews	vs	Team Stivrins	Bally Sports	69–64 (19–25, 25–22, 25–17)	Dani Drews (16)	Taylor Morgan; Jenna Rosenthal; Ronika Stone (3)	Carli Lloyd (27)	Amanda Benson (17)
Friday, March 25	6:00 PM	Team Stivrins	vs	Team de la Cruz	FS2	71–70 (26–24, 25–21, 20–25)	Bethania de la Cruz (27)	Eri Xue (4)	Nootsara Tomkom (43)	Erin Fairs (19)
Friday, March 25	8:30 PM	Team Valentín-Anderson	vs	Team Drews	FS2	70–66 (25–21, 20–25, 25–20)	Karsta Lowe; Dani Drews (18)	Taylor Morgan; Ali Bastianelli; Carli Lloyd; Taylor Sandbothe; Madison Villines; Jenna Rosenthal (2)	Carli Lloyd; Natalia Valentín-Anderson (33)	Amanda Benson (19)
Saturday, March 26	6:30 PM	Team Stivrins	vs	Team Valentín-Anderson	FS2	70–73 (22–25, 23–25, 25–23)	Leah Edmond (19)	Madison Villines (3)	Natalia Valentín-Anderson (37)	Morgan Hentz (16)
Saturday, March 26	9:00 PM	Team de la Cruz	vs	Team Drews	Bally Sports	68–57 (18–25, 25–9, 25–23)	Sheilla Castro (17)	Bethania de la Cruz (3)	Nootsara Tomkom (36)	Nomaris Velez Agosto (12)

=== Week 3 ===
2022 Athletes Unlimited Season
Week 3

Date	Time (CDT)	Matchup			TV	Result	High kills	High blocks	High assists	High digs
Wednesday, March 30	5:00 PM	Team Drews	vs	Team Lowe	YouTube	75–66 (25–27, 25–21, 25–18)	Leah Edmond (18)	Karsta Lowe; Madison Villines; Ronika Stone; Leah Edmond; Dani Drews (2)	Natalia Valentín-Anderson (41)	Karsta Lowe (21)
Wednesday, March 30	7:30	Team de la Cruz	vs	Team Sheilla	Bally Sports	61–72 (25–22, 18–25, 25–18)	Sheilla Castro (16)	Taylor Morgan; Ali Bastianelli (2)	Nootsara Tomkom (13)	Nootsara Tomkom (13)
Friday, April 1	6:00 PM	Team Sheilla	vs	Team Lowe	FS2	83–81 (19–25, 25–19, 39–37)	Sheilla Castro (23)	Ali Bastianelli (6)	Alisha Glass Childress (37)	Hana Lishman (15)
Friday, April 1	8:30 PM	Team Drews	vs	Team de la Cruz	FS2	77–59 (25–17, 27–25, 25–17)	Dani Drews (20)	Taylor Morgan (3)	Natalia Valentín-Anderson (39)	Morgan Hentz (12)
Saturday, April 2	6:00 PM	Team Sheilla	vs	Team Drews	CBS Sports	67–73 (20–25, 25–23, 22–25)	Jamie Peterson; Erin Fairs; Dani Drews (11)	Ronika Stone (5)	Natalia Valentín-Anderson (34)	Morgan Hentz (14)
Saturday, April 2	8:00 PM	Team Lowe	vs	Team de la Cruz	CBS Sports Network	63–61 (23–25, 15–25, 25–11)	Madison Villines; Bethania de la Cruz (15)	Naya Crittenden; Taylor Sandbothe; Lindsay Stalzer (2)	Carli Lloyd (25)	Nomaris Velez Agonsto (18)

=== Week 4 ===
2022 Athletes Unlimited Season
Week 4

Date	Time (CDT)	Matchup			TV	Result	High kills	High blocks	High assists	High digs
Wednesday, April 6	5:00 PM	Team Sheilla	vs	Team de la Cruz	YouTube	60–75 (22–25, 16–25, 22–25)	Bethania de la Cruz (15)	Ronika Stone; Cassidy Lichtman (3)	Alisha Glass Childress (38)	Nomaris Velez Agosto (14)
Wednesday, April 6	7:30	Team Drews	vs	Team Valentín-Anderson	YouTube	61–72 (18–25, 18–25, 25–22)	Dani Drews (18)	Taylor Sandbothe; Jenna Rosenthal; Leah Edmond; Dani Drews (2)	Natalia Valentín-Anderson (36)	Falyn Fonoimoana (17)
Friday, April 8	6:00 PM	Team Valentín-Anderson	vs	Team de la Cruz	FS2	72–69 (22–25, 25–23, 25–21)	Jenna Rosenthal; Bethania de la Cruz (16)	Molly McCage (5)	Natalia Valentín-Anderson (48)	Natalia Valentín-Anderson (17)
Friday, April 8	9:00 PM	Team Sheilla	vs	Team Drews	CBS Sports Network	75–56 (25–19, 25–20, 25–17)	Dani Drews (13)	Carli Lloyd (4)	Nootsara Tomkom (28)	Morgan Hentz (20)
Saturday, April 9	4:00 PM	Team Valentín-Anderson	vs	Team Sheilla	CBS Sports Network	54–75 (15–25, 22–25, 17–25)	Lindsay Stalzer; Leah Edmond (12)	Taylor Morgan; Lianna Sybeldon; Eri Xue; Kalei Mau; Ali Bastianelli; Sheilla Castro; Natalia Valentín-Anderson (1)	Natalia Valentín-Anderson (31)	Amanda Benson (17)
Saturday, April 9	7:00 PM	Team de la Cruz	vs	Team Drews	CBS Sports Network	73–64 (25–19, 25–20, 23–25)	Bethania de la Cruz (18)	Molly McCage (4)	Alisha Glass Childress (33)	Nomaris Velez Agosto (17)

=== Week 5 ===
2022 Athletes Unlimited Season
Week 5

Date	Time (CDT)	Matchup			TV	Result	High kills	High blocks	High assists	High digs
Wednesday, April 14	7:00 PM	Team Valentín-Anderson	vs	Team Drews	CBS Sports Network	71–67 (21–25, 25–19, 25–23)	Dani Drews (15)	Taylor Sandbothe (4)	Natalia Valentín-Anderson (33)	Hana Lishman (22)
Wednesday, April 14	9:00 PM	Team de la Cruz	vs	Team Lichtman	CBS Sports Network	71–66 (25–20, 21–25, 25–21)	Bethania de la Cruz (19)	Cassidy Lichtman (3)	Nootsara Tomkom (43)	Morgan Hentz (16)
Friday, April 15	6:00 PM	Team Lichtman	vs	Team Drews	FS2	68–65 (25–17, 25–23, 18–25)	Leah Edmond (14)	Molly McCage; Lianna Sybeldon (4)	Alisha Glass Childress (22)	Morgan Hentz (16)
Friday, April 15	9:00 PM	Team Valentín-Anderson	vs	Team de la Cruz	CBS Sports Network	61–75 (19–25, 23–25, 19–25)	Bethania de la Cruz (17)	Jenna Rosenthal (3)	Nootsara Tomkom (42)	Bethania de la Cruz (17)
Saturday, April 16	6:00 PM	Team Lichtman	vs	Team Valentín-Anderson	FS2	78–76 (25–20, 28–26, 18–25, 7–5)	Jamie Peterson (17)	Eri Xue; Taylor Sandbothe (3)	Alisha Glass Childress (35)	Morgan Hentz (21)
Saturday, April 16	9:00 PM	Team Drews	vs	Team de la Cruz	CBS Sports Network	73–76 (23–25, 22–25, 28–26)	Bethania de la Cruz (19)	Ray Santos; Lianna Sybeldon; Erin Fairs; Bethania de la Cruz (2)	Nootsara Tomkom (41)	Nomaris Velez Agosto (22)

== Leaderboard ==
Below is the leaderboard which tallies the total points earned via the scoring system that each player has accumulated during the games that are played each week. The list reflects the final standings.

Rank	Player	Points	Notes
1	Bethania de la Cruz	4,652	
2	Natalia Valentín-Anderson	3,337	
3	Dani Drews	3,308	
4	Cassidy Lichtman	3,279	
5	Nootsara Tomkom	3,027	
6	Leah Edmond	2,957	Unavailable on Saturday, April 16
7	Morgan Hentz	2,950	
8	Sheilla Castro	2,799	Unavailable during Week 5
9	Ronika Stone	2,784	
10	Erin Fairs	2,704	
11	Nomaris Velez Agost	2,701	
12	Aury Cruz	2,667	
13	Lindsay Stalzer	2,604	
14	Hana Lishman	2,597	
15	Amanda Benson	2,368	
16	Jenna Rosenthal	2,348	
17	Alisha Glass Childress	2,293	
18	Madison Villines	2,267	
19	Falyn Fonoimoana	2,209	
20	Karsta Lowe	2,131	Did not complete season due to injury
21	Taylor Sandbothe	2,098	
22	Carli Lloyd	2,076	
23	Ali Bastianelli	2,045	
24	Kalei Mau	2,033	
25	Jamie Peterson	2,012	
26	Eri Xue	1,978	
27	Lianna Sybeldon	1,924	
28	Molly McCage	1,921	
29	Emma Willis	1,898	
30	Taylor Morgan	1,839	
31	Taylor Fricano	1,819	
32	Tori Dilfer	1,728	
33	Valerie Nichol	1,661	
34	Ray Santos	1,619	
35	Niki Withers	1,618	
36	Taylor Bruns Tegenrot	1,605	
37	Erica Wilson	1,405	Unavailable on Saturday, April 16
38	Deja McClendon	1,379	
39	Naya Crittenden	1,347	Unavailable on Thursday, April 14
40	Rachael Fara	1,345	
41	Naomi Santos-Lamb	1,194	
42	Lauren Stivrins	901	Did not complete season due to injury
43	Sha'Dare McNeal	802	Did not complete season due to injury
44	Tina Boe	792	

== Team Captain Records ==
Team Captains Records
Team	Record (Win %)	Number of Weeks as Captain
Team de la Cruz	10–5 (.667)	5
Team Sheilla	4–2 (.667)	2
Team Lichtman	2–1 (.667)	1
Team McClendon	2–1 (.667)	1
Team Valentín-Anderson	5–4 (.556)	3
Team Drews	4–8 (.333)	4
Team Stivrins	1–2 (.333)	1
Team Lowe	1–5 (.167)	2
Team Cruz	0–3 (.000)	1

== Awards ==
The following players were named to the 2022 Dream Team:

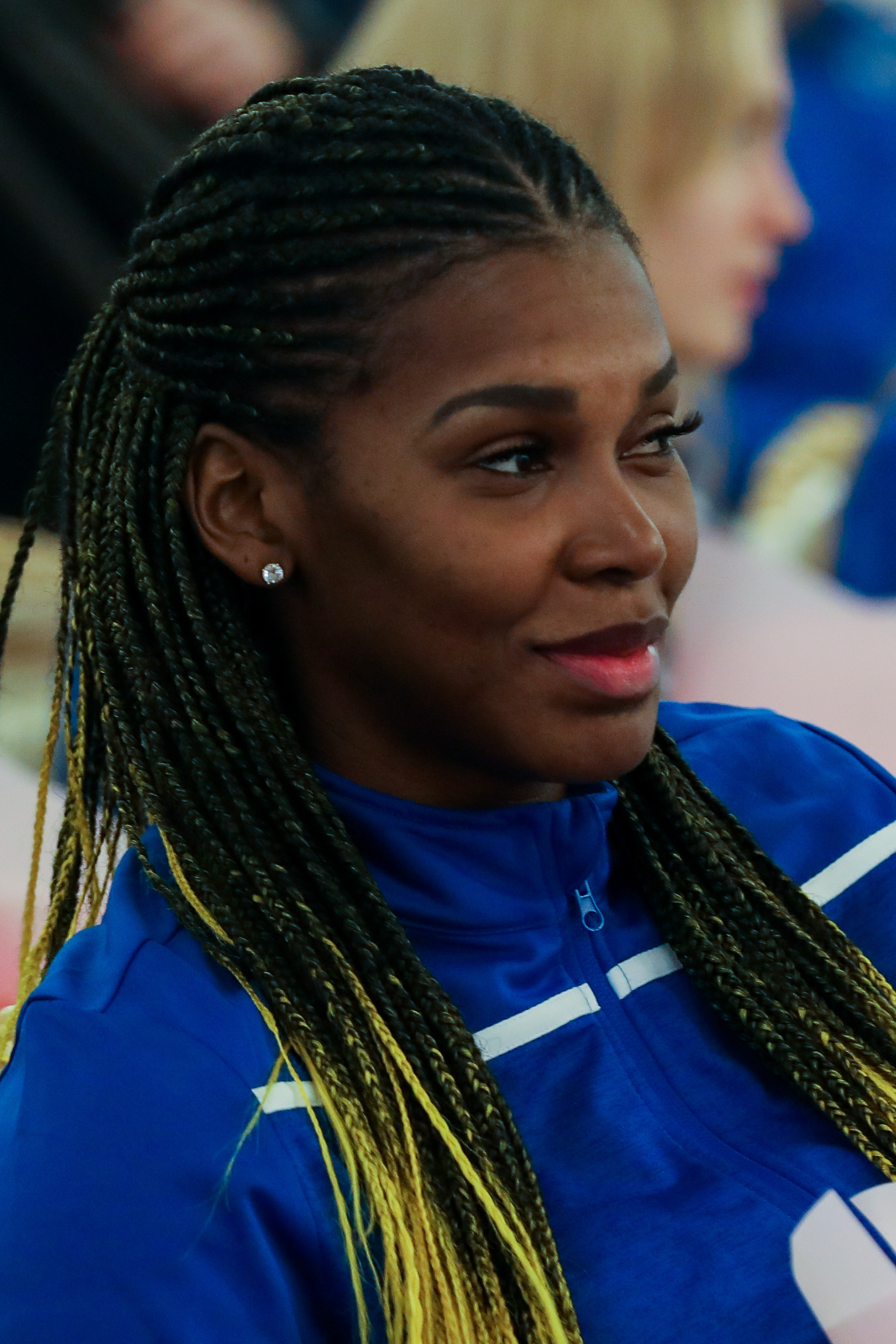
Bethania de la Cruz was the 2022 Athletes Unlimited champion

- Champion/MVP

Bethania de la Cruz (DOM)

- Best setter

Natalia Valentín-Anderson (PUR)

- Best outside hitters

Bethania de la Cruz (DOM)
Dani Drews (USA)

- Best middle blockers

Molly McCage (USA)
Jenna Rosenthal (USA)

- Best Opposite

Sheilla Castro (BRA)

- Best libero

Morgan Hentz (USA)

Hentz was also named the Defensive Player of the Year.
