= Jenna Rosenthal =

American volleyball player

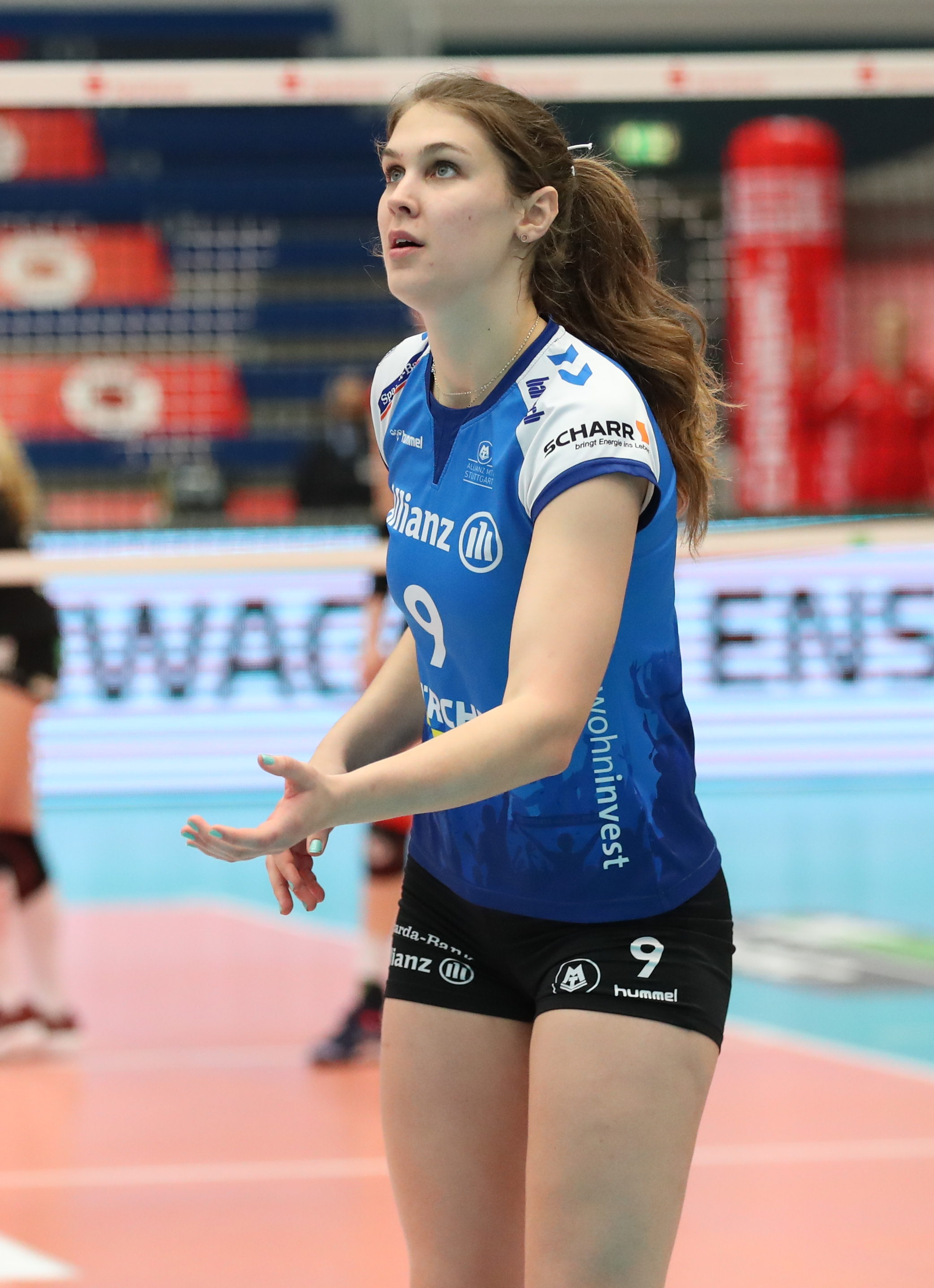
- Rosenthal in 2021

Personal information
- Nationality: United States
- Born: May 14, 1996 (age 30); Fond du Lac, Wisconsin, U.S.
- Hometown: Fond du Lac, Wisconsin, U.S.
- Height: 6 ft 6 in (1.98 m)
- Spike: 125 in (318 cm)
- Block: 120 in (305 cm)
- Education: Marquette

Volleyball information
- Position: Middle Blocker
- Current club: (United States) Atlanta Vibe
- Number: 16

Career
Years	Teams
2014–2018	(United States) Marquette
2018–2019	(Finland) LP Viesti (fr)
2019–2021	(Germany) Allianz MTV Stuttgart
2022	(United States) Athletes Unlimited
2024	(United States) Columbus Fury
2025-	(United States) Atlanta Vibe

National team
2019	United States
Medal record
Indoor Volleyball
Representing the United States
Pan-American Cup
Gold medal – first place	2019 Trujillo/Chiclayo

Jenna Rosenthal (born May 14, 1996) is an American professional volleyball player who plays as a middle blocker for the Atlanta Vibe of the Pro Volleyball Federation. She has played for the U.S. national team. Professionally, she has played in Finland, Germany, and most recently in 2022, the United States. Collegiately, she played for Marquette University from 2014–2018.

== Career ==
=== College ===
Rosenthal played volleyball for Marquette University from 2014–2018. She graduated with a degree in engineering.

Rosenthal's most notable seasons were from 2016–2018. She was named on the First Team for the Big East Conference all 3 seasons.

=== Professional clubs ===
- (Finland) LP Viesti (2018–2019)
- (Germany) Allianz MTV Stuttgart (2019–2021)
- (United States) Athletes Unlimited (2022)
- (United States) Columbus Fury (2024)
- (United States) Atlanta Vibe (2025-)

=== USA National Team ===
Rosenthal made her national team debut in 2019, playing in the 2019 Pan American Games, USA finished in 7th place. She also represented USA at the 2019 Pan American Cup, earning a gold medal with the team.

== Awards and honors ==
=== Clubs ===
- 2020–2021 German Bundesliga – Silver medal, with Allianz MTV Stuttgart
- 2020–2021 German Cup – Bronze Medal, with Allianz MTV Stuttgart
- 2019–2020 German Super Cup – Silver Medal, with Allianz MTV Stuttgart
- 2019–2020 German Cup – Silver Medal, with Allianz MTV Stuttgart
- 2018–2019 Finland Cup – Bronze Medal, with LP Viesti
- 2018–2019 Finland Mestaruusliiga – Gold Medal, with LP Viesti

=== International ===
- 2019 Pan-American Cup, Gold Medal with the U.S. National Team.

=== Individual ===
- 2022 Athletes Unlimited - "Best Middle Blocker"
- Big East All-Conference First-Team (2016, 2017, 2018)
- AVCA All-East Coast Honorable Mention (2018)
- AVCA All-East Coast (2016, 2017)
