= Dani Drews =

American volleyball player (born 1999)

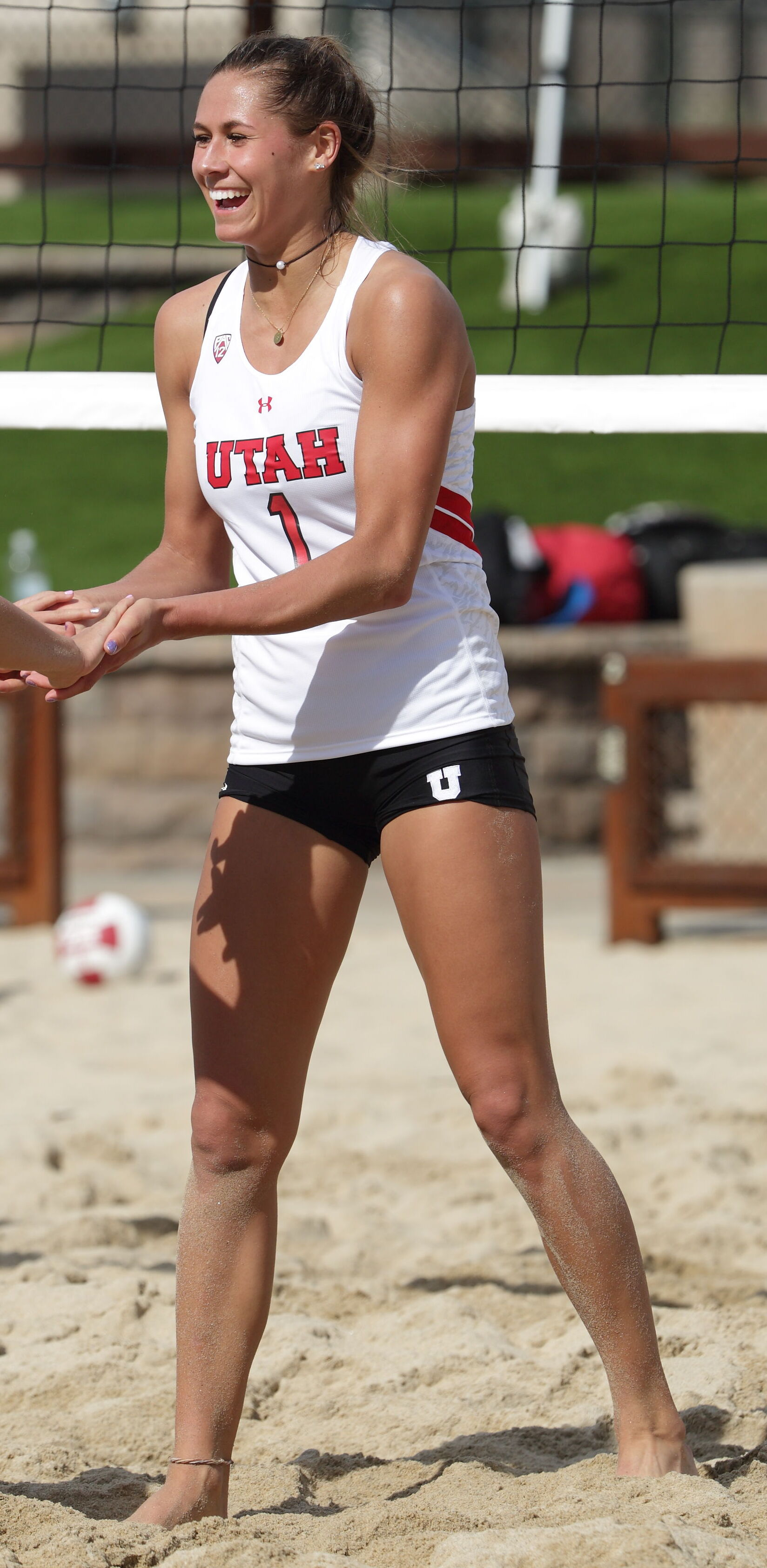
- Drews in 2017

Personal information
- Full name: Danielle Drews
- Nickname: Dani
- Nationality: United States
- Born: February 2, 1999 (age 27)
- Hometown: Sandy, Utah, U.S.
- Height: 6 ft 0 in (1.83 m)
- Spike: 121 in (307 cm)
- Block: 116 in (295 cm)
- Education: Utah

Volleyball information
- Position: Outside hitter
- Current club: (United States) LOVB Salt Lake
- Number: 17

Career
Years	Teams
2017–2021	(United States) Utah
2021–2022	(Poland) KPS Chemik Police
2022	(United States) Athletes Unlimited
2022–2023	(Italy) Cuneo
2023–2024	(Japan) NEC Red Rockets
2024	(United States) Athletes Unlimited
2024-	(United States) LOVB Salt Lake

National team
2022–	United States
Medal record
Indoor Volleyball
Pan-American Cup
Representing the United States
Bronze medal – third place	2022 Hermosillo
Pan-American Cup Final Six
Silver medal – second place	2022 Santo Domingo

Danielle Drews (née Barton; born February 2, 1999) is an American professional volleyball player who plays as an outside hitter for the United States women's national volleyball team and LOVB Pro team LOVB Salt Lake.

== Personal life ==
Drews is from Sandy, Utah and attended Brighton High School. She comes from an athletic family: her father, Paul Barton, played baseball and football at Utah from 1989 to 1991. Her mother, Mikki Barton, played basketball and volleyball at Utah. Her brothers, Jackson, Cody, and Lander, all play football in the NFL.

Drews married former Utah football player Christian Drews in 2018.

== Career ==
=== College ===
Drews is left handed. She played indoor college volleyball for a total of five years, as she opted to use the extra year of eligibility granted by the NCAA due to the COVID-19 pandemic.

She finished her career as Utah's All-Time Leader in career kills (2,268), sets played (561), matches played (150), and attempts (5,655). She is the only player in Utah history to record 2,000 kills and 1,000 digs. She finished her career ranked second all-time in the Pac-12 in career kills. She was invited to train with the U.S. collegiate national team in 2020 and 2021.

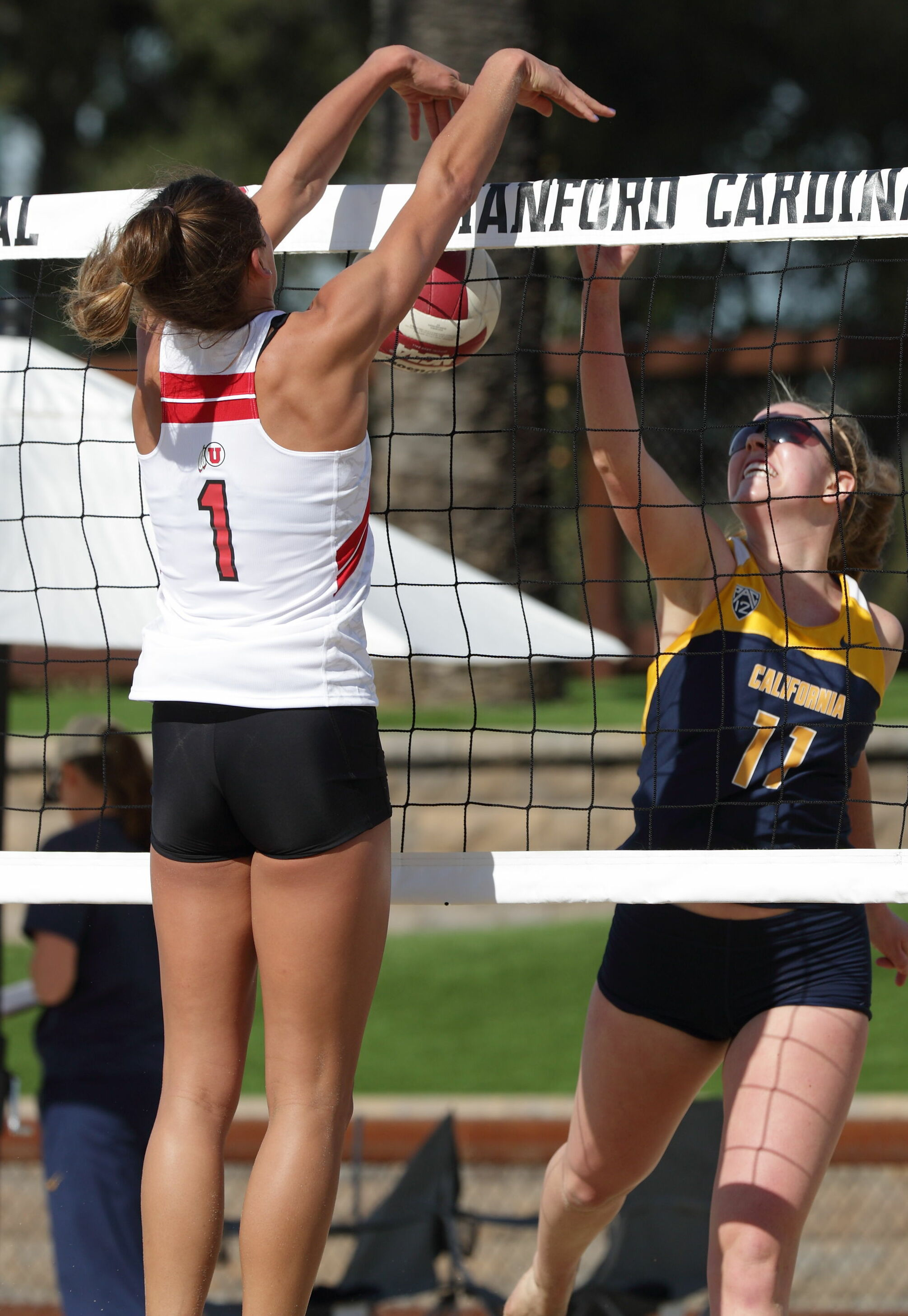
Drews (#1) blocking volleyball during a beach volleyball match

Drews also played beach volleyball at Utah and has participated in AVP tours. When she was in high school, she was intending to play collegiate beach volleyball for USC, but decided on Utah as she wanted to be close to her family. For Utah's beach team, she was named All-Pac-12 Second Team in 2017, 2018, and 2019.

=== Professional clubs ===
- (Poland) KPS Chemik Police (2021–2022)
- (United States) Athletes Unlimited (2022)
- (Italy) Cuneo (2022–2023)
- (Japan) NEC Red Rockets (2023-2024)
- (United States) Athletes Unlimited (2024)
- (United States) LOVB Salt Lake (2024-)

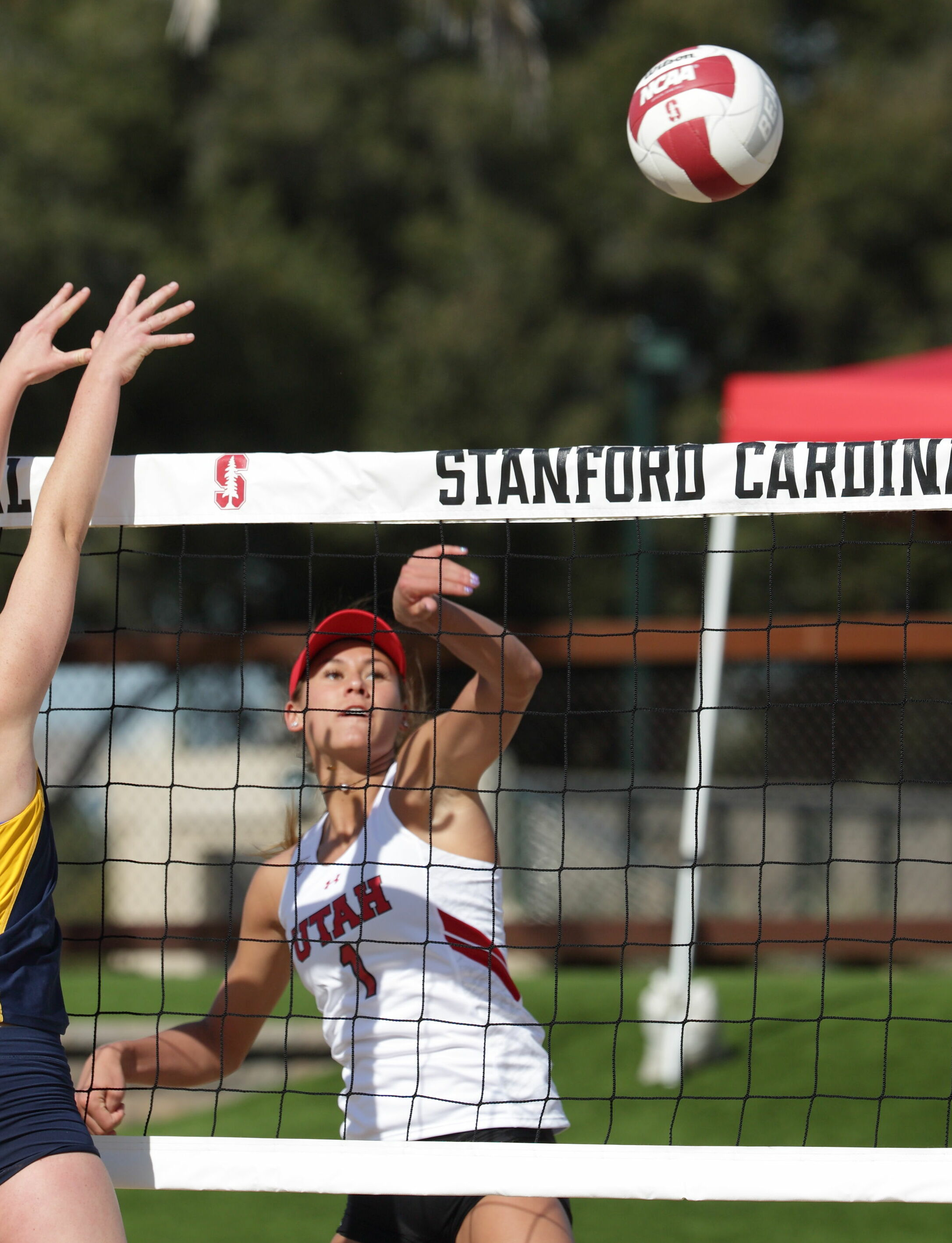
Drews spiking volleyball during a beach volleyball match

Drews signed her first professional contract with Polish club KPS Chemik Police, however she left the team without informing them before the season ended due to the 2022 Russian invasion of Ukraine. The officials of the club informed Drews that remaining in Poland was safe, but on February 25, she didn't appear at the briefing and training before the Polish Cup match. It was reported that the team will seek disciplinary punishment of Drews with the International Volleyball Federation (FIVB) and USA Volleyball. After returning to the U.S., she joined Athletes Unlimited in March 2022 and ended the season with 3,308 ranking points that included 222 kills, 119 digs, and 14 services aces, ranking third in total points out of 44 players. She was named to the Dream Team for the 2022 season. She signed with Italian Series A1 Team Cuneo for the 2022–2023 season.

=== USA National Team ===
In May 2022, Drews made her national team debut when she was named to the 25-player wide roster for the 2022 FIVB Volleyball Nations League tournament, but did not see any playing time in the tournament.

In August 2022, Drews participated in the 2022 Women's Pan-American Volleyball Cup. Drews started for USA's opening match in a four set victory over Peru, recording 19 points on 15 kills, 2 blocks and 2 aces. Drews scored 24 points on 23 kills and one ace in a 3–2 loss to the Dominican Republic in a preliminary round match. The U.S. would eventually win the bronze medal after defeating tournament hosts Mexico in 4 sets.

In September 2022, Drews played in the Pan American Cup Final Six Tournament. In the opening match victory versus Mexico, she led all scorers with 15 points, recording 14 kills and 1 ace. In the semifinal match versus Puerto Rico, Drews again led the team with scoring, recording 21 total points on 15 kills, 5 blocks, and an ace. Drews recorded 7 total points in the gold medal match to Dominican Republic, U.S. lost the match, winning the silver medal for the tournament.

== Awards and honors ==
=== Clubs ===
- 2022 Athletes Unlimited – Best outside hitter

=== College ===
- Four-time AVCA All-American (First Team – 2019, 2020, 2021; Second Team – 2018 )
- Pac-12 Player of the Year (2020)
