= Lander Barton =

American football player (born 2003)

No. 57 – Los Angeles Chargers
- Position: Linebacker
- Roster status: Practice squad

Personal information
- Born: December 30, 2003 (age 22); Cottonwood Heights, Utah, U.S.
- Listed height: 6 ft 5 in (1.96 m)
- Listed weight: 240 lb (109 kg)

Career information
- High school: Brighton (Cottonwood Heights)
- College: Utah (2022–2025)
- NFL draft: 2026: undrafted

Career history
- Los Angeles Chargers (2026–present)*
- * Offseason or practice squad member only

Awards and highlights
- Second-team Freshman All-American (2022); Pac-12 Defensive Freshman of the Year (2022)
- Stats at Pro Football Reference

Lander Barton (born December 30, 2003) is an American professional football linebacker for the Los Angeles Chargers of the National Football League (NFL). He played college football for the Utah Utes and signed with the Chargers as an undrafted free agent in 2026.

== Early life ==
Barton was born c. 2003 – c. 2004 in Cottonwood Heights, Utah, later attending Brighton High School. He comes from a family of athletes; his father, Paul, played baseball and football for the Utah Utes; his mother, Mikki-Kane, was an honorable mention All-American basketball player for Utah as well as an athlete competing in volleyball; his sister, Dani Drews, was an All-American volleyball player for the Utes and is a professional volleyball player overseas, in the United States, and for the United States Women’s National Team; and both of his brothers, Cody and Jackson, each have played for Utah and in the National Football League (NFL).

Barton attended Brighton High School and played basketball and football: in football, he was twice first-team all-state, twice first-team all-region and was the 2020 Region 6 MVP; and in basketball he was a second-team all-state choice. He played linebacker and wide receiver in football, totaling 122 tackles in addition to two interceptions as a senior while also having a career total of 16 receiving touchdowns. Barton was highly recruited, being ranked a four-star prospect, the second-best player in the state and the 17th-best linebacker nationally. He committed to play college football for the Utah Utes, following in the steps of several of his family members.

== College career ==
As a true freshman at Utah in 2022, Barton appeared in 14 games, three as a starter, and posted 46 tackles, eight TFLs, 4.5 sacks, a forced fumble and fumble recovery. He was selected by College Football News as a second-team Freshman All-American and was named the Pac-12 Conference Freshman Defensive Player of the Year. He entered the 2023 season as a starter at linebacker.

== Professional career ==
Pre-draft measurables
| Height | Weight | Arm length | Hand span | Wingspan | 40-yard dash | 10-yard split | 20-yard split | 20-yard shuttle | Vertical jump | Broad jump |
|---|---|---|---|---|---|---|---|---|---|---|
| 6 ft 4 5/8 in (1.95 m) | 233 lb (106 kg) | 32 1/4 in (0.82 m) | 9 1/2 in (0.24 m) | 6 ft 8 in (2.03 m) | 4.81 s | 1.64 s | 2.73 s | 4.40 s | 33.0 in (0.84 m) | 9 ft 11 in (3.02 m) |
All values from NFL Combine/Pro Day

After going undrafted in the 2026 NFL draft, Barton signed with the Los Angeles Chargers as an undrafted free agent. He was waived by Los Angeles as a part of final roster cuts on August 30, 2026; he was re-signed to the team's practice squad the following day.

== Personal life ==
Barton has two older brothers who are also NFL players and were both drafted in 2019: Cody, who is also a linebacker and was drafted by the Seattle Seahawks in the third round, and currently plays for the Tennessee Titans; and Jackson, who was drafted by the Indianapolis Colts in the seventh round as an offensive tackle, and is currently a free agent. His sister, Dani, is a member of the United States women's national volleyball team
