= Natalia Valentín =

Puerto Rican volleyball player (born 1989)

Natalia Valentín-Anderson

Personal information
- Full name: Natalia Cristina Valentín León
- Nickname: Naty
- Nationality: Puerto Rican
- Born: December 9, 1989 (age 36); Río Piedras, Puerto Rico
- Hometown: Caguas, Puerto Rico
- Height: 1.70 m (5 ft 7 in)
- Weight: 61 kg (134 lb)
- Spike: 244 cm (96 in)
- Block: 240 cm (94 in)
- Education: FIU

Volleyball information
- Position: Setter
- Current club: Dallas Pulse
- Number: 1

Career
Years	Teams
2014–2015; 2015–2016; 2016–2017; 2022; 2024–	Leonas de Ponce; Azerrail Baku; Leonas de Ponce; Athletes Unlimited; Omaha Supernovas

National team
2011–	Puerto Rico
Medal record
Women's volleyball
Representing Puerto Rico
Central American and Caribbean Games
Silver medal – second place	2014 Veracruz	Team
NORCECA Championship
Bronze medal – third place	2013 Omaha
Bronze medal – third place	2015 Michoacan
Pan-American Cup
Silver medal – second place	2016 Santo Domingo
Bronze medal – third place	2014 Mexico City
Bronze medal – third place	2017 Cañete

Natalia Cristina Valentín León, also known as Natalia Valentín-Anderson (born September 12, 1989) is a Puerto Rican volleyball player. She is a member of the Dallas Pulse of Major League Volleyball and a former captain of the Puerto Rican national team.

== Early life ==
Valentín-Anderson was born in Río Piedras, Puerto Rico to Raúl Valentín and Norma León. She originally was a runner until her mother encouraged her to try volleyball. She earned a scholarship to Florida International University, where she received All-Sun Belt Conference honors three times and became the program's all-time assists leader.

== Professional career ==
Valentín-Anderson has played professionally in more than five countries. In 2024, she joined the Omaha Supernovas, with whom she won the inaugural championship. For the 2026 season, she joined expansion team Dallas Pulse.

At the 2016 Summer Olympics, Valentín-Anderson competed with the Puerto Rican national team.

== Clubs ==
- (Puerto Rico) Leonas de Ponce (2014–2015)
- (Azerbaijan) Azerrail Baku (2015–2016)
- (France) Saint-Raphael Var Volley-Ball (2017–2019)
- (Poland) Skyres Rzeszow (2019–2020)
- (Italy) Volley Bergamo 1991 (2020–2021)
- (United States) Athletes Unlimited (2022)
- (United States) Omaha Supernovas (2024–2025)
- (United States) Dallas Pulse (2026–)

== Awards ==
=== Individual ===
- 2022 Athletes Unlimited "Best Setter"

=== Club ===
- 2015–2016 Azerbaijan Super League – Champion, with Azerrail Baku
