= Cody Barton =

American football player (born 1996)

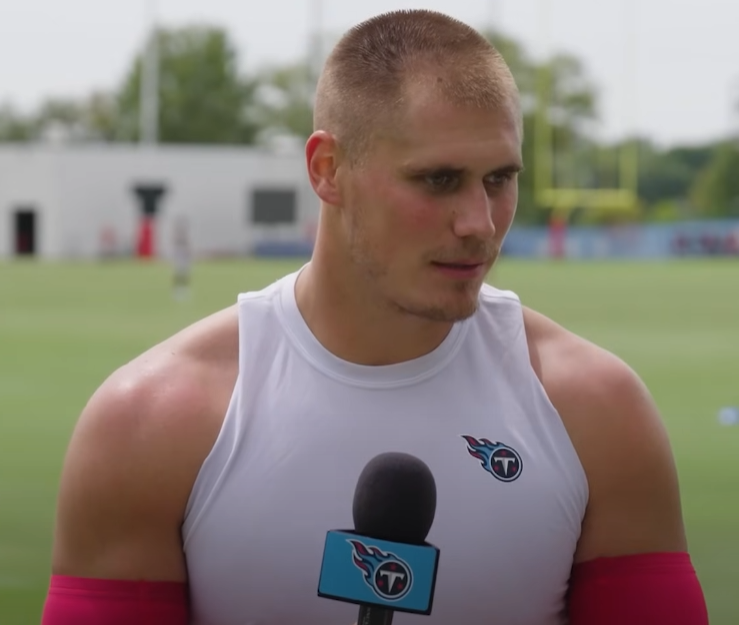
- Barton with the Tennessee Titans in 2025

No. 50 – Tennessee Titans
- Position: Linebacker
- Roster status: Active

Personal information
- Born: November 13, 1996 (age 29); Salt Lake City, Utah, U.S.
- Listed height: 6 ft 2 in (1.88 m)
- Listed weight: 237 lb (108 kg)

Career information
- High school: Brighton (Cottonwood Heights, Utah)
- College: Utah (2015–2018)
- NFL draft: 2019: 3rd round, 88th overall pick

Career history
- Seattle Seahawks (2019–2022); Washington Commanders (2023); Denver Broncos (2024); Tennessee Titans (2025–present)

Career NFL statistics as of Week 8, 2026
- Total tackles: 573
- Sacks: 4.5
- Forced fumbles: 3
- Fumble recoveries: 3
- Pass deflections: 26
- Interceptions: 8
- Defensive touchdowns: 2
- Stats at Pro Football Reference

Cody Likeke Barton (born November 13, 1996) is an American professional football linebacker for the Tennessee Titans of the National Football League (NFL). He played college football for the Utah Utes and was selected by the Seattle Seahawks in the third round of the 2019 NFL draft. He has also played in the NFL for the Washington Commanders and Denver Broncos.

== Professional career ==
Pre-draft measurables
Height	Weight	Arm length	Hand span	Wingspan	40-yard dash	10-yard split	20-yard split	20-yard shuttle	Three-cone drill	Vertical jump	Broad jump	Bench press
6 ft 2 1/2 in (1.89 m)	237 lb (108 kg)	31 7/8 in (0.81 m)	9 1/4 in (0.23 m)	6 ft 4 1/4 in (1.94 m)	4.64 s	1.54 s	2.71 s	4.03 s	6.90 s	32.5 in (0.83 m)	9 ft 8 in (2.95 m)	30 reps
All values from NFL Combine

=== Seattle Seahawks ===
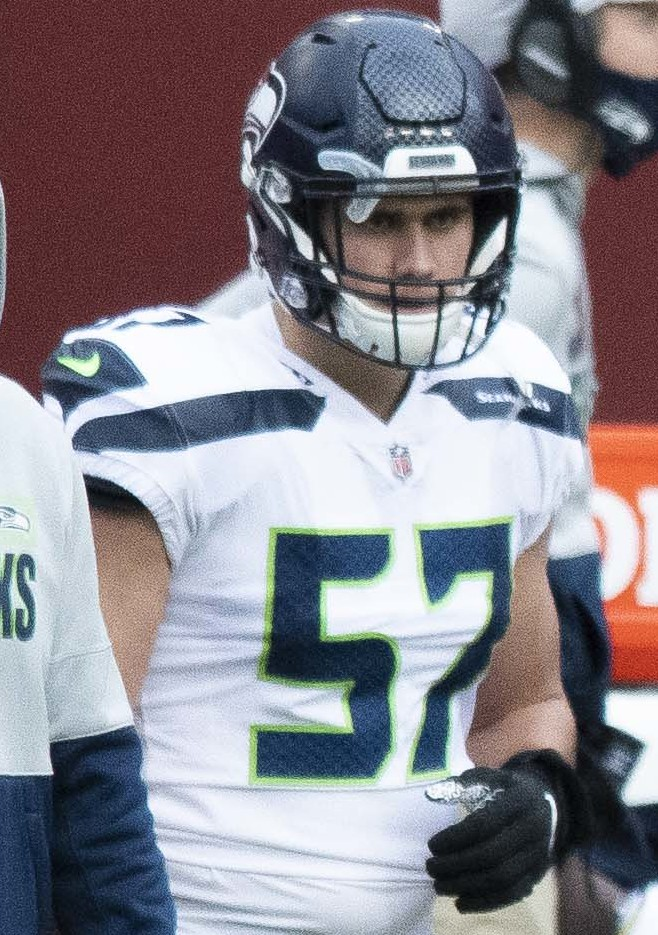
Barton with the Seattle Seahawks in 2020

Barton was drafted by the Seattle Seahawks in the third round (88th overall) of the 2019 NFL draft. He made his professional debut in Week 3 of the 2019 season and recorded his first takeaway in the same game after recovering a muffed punt from New Orleans Saints returner Deonte Harris. He spent the majority of his rookie season on Seattle's special teams units and led the team in special teams snaps. He became a starting linebacker in the 2020 season.

=== Washington Commanders ===
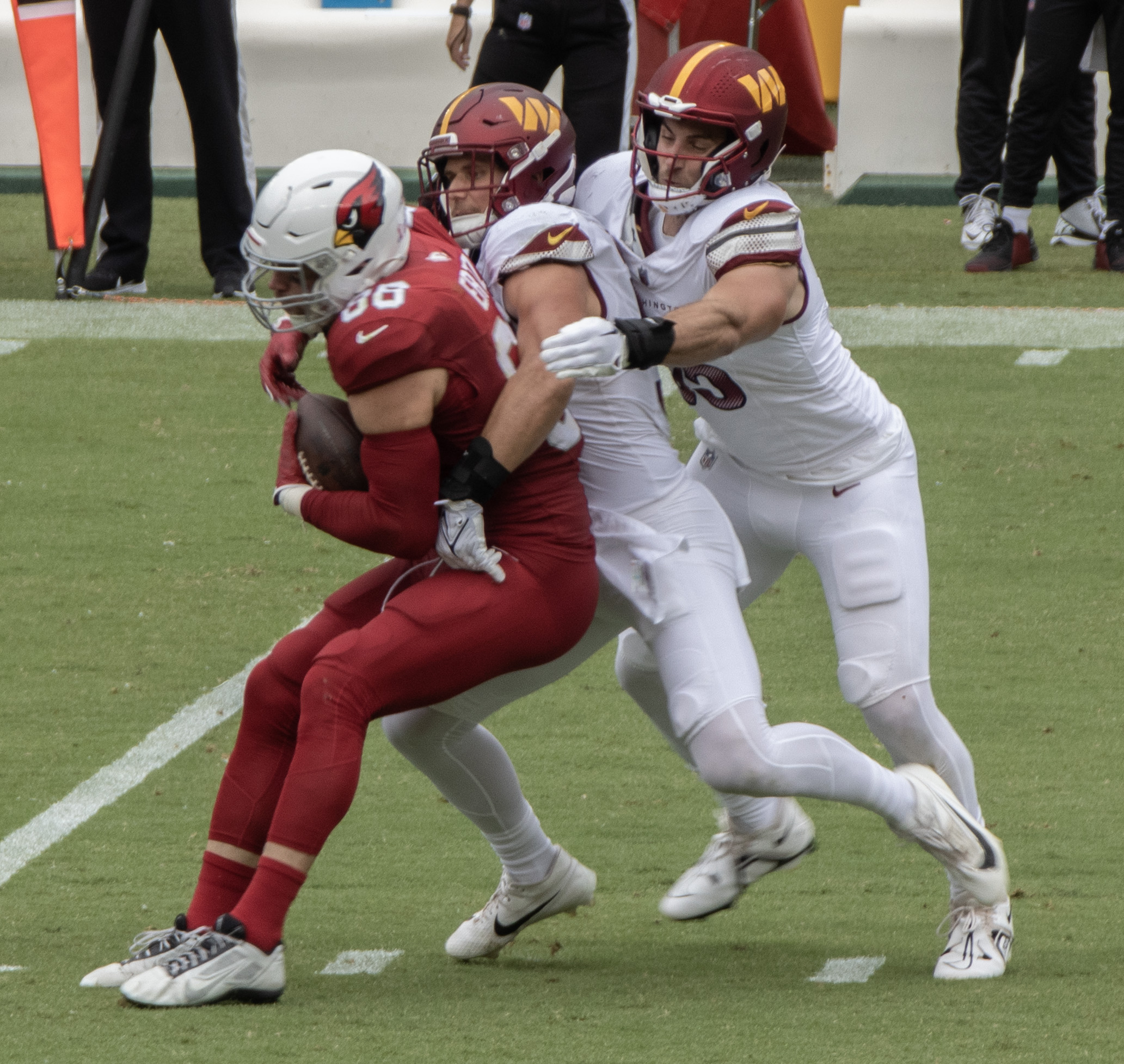
Barton (middle) playing for the Washington Commanders in 2023

Barton signed a one-year contract with the Washington Commanders on March 16, 2023. He suffered a high ankle sprain in Week 7 and was placed on injured reserve on October 28, 2023. On November 22, the Commanders reactivated Barton.

=== Denver Broncos ===
On March 18, 2024, Barton signed a one-year, $3.5 million contract with the Denver Broncos. In a Week 7 victory over the New Orleans Saints on October 17, 2024, Barton scored his first career touchdown on a 52-yard fumble return. Barton also recorded eight tackles, a pass deflection, and a strip sack. This led to him being named AFC Defensive Player of the Week.

=== Tennessee Titans ===
On March 13, 2025, Barton signed a three-year, $21 million contract with the Tennessee Titans.

== NFL career statistics ==
Legend
**Bold**	Career high

=== Regular season ===
Year	Team	Games		Tackles					Fumbles				Interceptions					
Year	Team	GP	GS	Cmb	Solo	Ast	Sck	TFL	FF	FR	Yds	TD	PD	Int	Yds	Avg	Lng	TD
2019	SEA	16	2	23	9	14	0.0	0	0	**1**	0	0	1	0	0	—	—	0
2020	SEA	16	2	35	24	11	0.0	0	**2**	0	0	0	0	0	0	—	—	0
2021	SEA	16	1	37	23	14	0.0	1	0	0	0	0	1	0	0	—	—	0
2022	SEA	**17**	11	**136**	**84**	52	**2.0**	**4**	0	0	0	0	6	2	11	5.5	10	0
2023	WAS	13	13	121	67	**54**	0.0	3	0	**1**	5	0	1	1	52	**52.0**	52	0
2024	DEN	**17**	14	106	53	53	1.5	2	1	**1**	**52**	**1**	5	2	**71**	35.5	**56**	0
2025	TEN	**17**	**17**	81	37	44	1.0	**4**	0	0	0	0	**11**	**3**	25	8.3	24	**1**
Career		112	60	539	297	242	4.5	14	3	3	57	1	25	8	159	19.9	56	1

=== Postseason ===
Year	Team	Games		Tackles					Fumbles				Interceptions					
Year	Team	GP	GS	Cmb	Solo	Ast	Sck	TFL	FF	FR	Yds	TD	PD	Int	Yds	Avg	Lng	TD
2019	SEA	**2**	**2**	8	**4**	4	**1.0**	**1**	0	0	0	0	**2**	0	0	—	—	0
2020	SEA	1	0	1	1	0	0.0	0	0	0	0	0	0	0	0	—	—	0
2022	SEA	1	1	**9**	**4**	5	0.0	**1**	0	0	0	0	1	0	0	—	—	0
2024	DEN	1	1	8	2	**6**	0.0	0	0	0	0	0	0	0	0	—	—	0
Career		5	4	26	11	15	1.0	2	0	0	0	0	3	0	0	—	—	0

== Personal life ==
Barton's older brother, Jackson, was drafted by the Indianapolis Colts in the seventh round of the 2019 NFL draft as an offensive tackle, and is currently a free agent. They played in the same class at Utah after Jackson redshirted. His younger brother, Lander, is also a linebacker and signed as an undrafted rookie with the Los Angeles Chargers in 2026. His sister, Dani, is a member of the United States women's national volleyball team.
