= Jackson Barton =

American football player (born 1995)

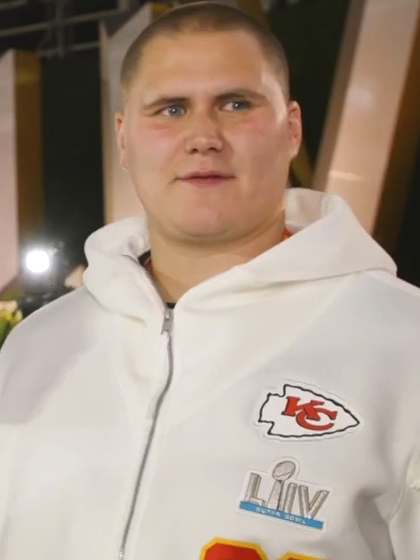
- Barton in 2020

Profile
- Position: Offensive tackle

Personal information
- Born: August 8, 1995 (age 31); Salt Lake City, Utah, U.S.
- Listed height: 6 ft 7 in (2.01 m)
- Listed weight: 302 lb (137 kg)

Career information
- High school: Brighton (Cottonwood Heights, Utah)
- College: Utah (2014–2018)
- NFL draft: 2019: 7th round, 240th overall pick

Career history
- Indianapolis Colts (2019)*; Kansas City Chiefs (2019); New York Giants (2020–2021); Las Vegas Raiders (2021–2022); Arizona Cardinals (2023–2024); Cleveland Browns (2025)*
- * Offseason or practice squad member only

Awards and highlights
- Super Bowl champion (LIV); First-team All-Pac-12 (2018)

Career NFL statistics as of 2024
- Games played: 13
- Games started: 2
- Stats at Pro Football Reference

Jackson Barton (born August 8, 1995) is an American professional football offensive tackle. He played college football at Utah and was drafted by the Indianapolis Colts in the seventh round of the 2019 NFL draft. He has also been a member of the Kansas City Chiefs and New York Giants.

== Professional career ==
Pre-draft measurables
Height	Weight	Arm length	Hand span	Wingspan	40-yard dash	10-yard split	20-yard split	20-yard shuttle	Three-cone drill	Vertical jump	Broad jump	Bench press
6 ft 7 1/4 in (2.01 m)	310 lb (141 kg)	34 in (0.86 m)	9 1/4 in (0.23 m)	6 ft 9 3/4 in (2.08 m)	5.18 s	1.82 s	3.02 s	4.66 s	7.85 s	27.0 in (0.69 m)	9 ft 1 in (2.77 m)	25 reps
All values from NFL Combine

=== Indianapolis Colts ===
Barton was drafted by the Indianapolis Colts in the seventh round (240th overall) of the 2019 NFL draft. He was waived on August 31, 2019, and was signed to the practice squad the next day.

=== Kansas City Chiefs ===
Barton was signed by the Kansas City Chiefs off the Colts practice squad on November 11, 2019. Barton was part of the Chiefs team which won Super Bowl LIV after defeating the San Francisco 49ers 31–20. He was waived on September 5, 2020.

=== New York Giants ===
On September 6, 2020, Barton was claimed off waivers by the New York Giants. He signed a contract extension with the Giants on January 4, 2021.

On August 31, 2021, Barton was waived by the Giants and re-signed to the practice squad the next day.

=== Las Vegas Raiders ===
On September 21, 2021, Barton was signed off the Giants' practice squad by the Las Vegas Raiders. He appeared in two games for the team, playing three snaps versus the Washington Commanders in Week 13, and three snaps against the Kansas City Chiefs in Week 14.

On October 1, 2022, Barton was waived by the Raiders and re-signed to the practice squad. On October 26, 2022, Barton was signed to the active roster.

=== Arizona Cardinals ===
On April 14, 2023, Barton signed with the Arizona Cardinals. He was released on August 29, and re-signed to the practice squad. He signed a reserve/future contract on January 8, 2024.

Barton was waived by the Cardinals on August 27, 2024, and re-signed to the practice squad. He was promoted to the active roster on December 24.

=== Cleveland Browns ===
On June 9, 2025, Barton signed with the Cleveland Browns. He was released on August 24.

== Personal life ==
Barton has two younger brothers who also play football and are both linebackers: Cody, who was drafted by the Seattle Seahawks in the third round of the 2019 NFL Draft, and currently plays for the Tennessee Titans; and Lander, who signed as an undrafted rookie with the Los Angeles Chargers in 2026. His sister, Dani, is a member of the United States women's national volleyball team.
