= 2019 Women's Pan-American Volleyball Cup =

Tournament details
- Host country: Peru
- Dates: 6–14 July
- Teams: 11
- Venues: 2 (in 2 host cities)

Final positions
- Champions: United States (7th title)

Tournament awards
- MVP: (United States) Micha Hancock

The 2019 Women's Pan-American Volleyball Cup was the 18th edition of the annual women's volleyball tournament. It was held in Trujillo and Chiclayo, Peru from 6 to 14 July. Eleven teams will compete in the tournament.

United States won the title for the third straight time (7th overall) after defeating the Dominican Republic in the final by 3–0.

== Pools composition ==
Pool A	Pool B
Argentina	Colombia
Canada	Mexico
Cuba	Puerto Rico
Dominican Republic	Trinidad and Tobago
Guatemala	United States
Peru	

== Venues ==
- Coliseo Gran Chimu, Trujillo (Group A, quarterfinals, semifinals, 5th place, 3rd place and final matches)
- Coliseo Cerrado de Chiclayo, Chiclayo (Group B, classification 7th–10th, 9th place and 7th place matches)

== Pool standing procedure ==
1. Number of matches won
2. Match points
3. Points ratio
4. Sets ratio
5. Result of the last match between the tied teams

Match won 3–0: 5 match points for the winner, 0 match points for the loser
Match won 3–1: 4 match points for the winner, 1 match point for the loser
Match won 3–2: 3 match points for the winner, 2 match points for the loser

== Preliminary round ==
- All times are Peru Time (UTC−05:00).

=== Group A ===
Pos	Team	Pld	W	L	Pts	SPW	SPL	SPR	SW	SL	SR	Qualification
1	Dominican Republic	5	5	0	19	476	392	1.214	15	6	2.500	Semifinals
2	Argentina	5	4	1	17	498	434	1.147	14	8	1.750	Quarterfinals
3	Canada	5	3	2	19	435	367	1.185	13	6	2.167	Quarterfinals
4	Peru	5	2	3	11	353	325	1.086	7	9	0.778	7th–10th classification
5	Cuba	5	1	4	9	404	414	0.976	7	12	0.583	7th–10th classification
6	Guatemala	5	0	5	0	141	375	0.376	0	15	0.000	

Date	Time		Score		Set 1	Set 2	Set 3	Set 4	Set 5	Total	Report
6 Jul	16:00	Argentina	3–2	Canada	25–27	25–23	25–21	23–25	19–17	117–113	P2 P3
6 Jul	18:00	Dominican Republic	3–2	Cuba	23–25	19–25	29–27	25–18	15–12	111–107	P2 P3
6 Jul	20:00	Peru	3–0	Guatemala	25–9	25–8	25–9			75–26	P2 P3
7 Jul	16:00	Guatemala	0–3	Dominican Republic	6–25	8–25	10–25			24–75	P2 P3
7 Jul	18:00	Cuba	0–3	Canada	19–25	21–25	22–25			62–75	P2 P3
7 Jul	20:00	Peru	1–3	Argentina	25–18	21–25	15–25	19–25		80–93	P2 P3
8 Jul	16:00	Cuba	3–0	Guatemala	25–14	25–13	25–12			75–39	P2 P3
8 Jul	18:00	Argentina	2–3	Dominican Republic	25–17	17–25	25–21	21–25	14–16	102–104	P2 P3
8 Jul	20:00	Peru	0–3	Canada	22–25	14–25	22–25			58–75	P2 P3
9 Jul	16:00	Guatemala	0–3	Argentina	12–25	14–25	7–25			33–75	P2 P3
9 Jul	18:00	Dominican Republic	3–2	Canada	25–18	25–27	21–25	25–14	15–13	111–97	P2 P3
9 Jul	20:00	Peru	3–0	Cuba	25–20	28–26	25–10			78–56	P2 P3
10 Jul	16:00	Canada	3–0	Guatemala	25–6	25–5	25–8			75–19	P2 P3
10 Jul	18:00	Cuba	2–3	Argentina	23–25	25–20	18–25	28–26	10–15	104–111	P2 P3
10 Jul	20:00	Peru	0–3	Dominican Republic	22–25	22–25	18–25			62–75	P2 P3

=== Group B ===
Pos	Team	Pld	W	L	Pts	SPW	SPL	SPR	SW	SL	SR	Qualification
1	United States	4	4	0	19	325	231	1.407	12	1	12.000	Semifinals
2	Puerto Rico	4	3	1	15	333	271	1.229	10	4	2.500	Quarterfinals
3	Colombia	4	2	2	11	297	231	1.286	7	6	1.167	Quarterfinals
4	Mexico	4	1	3	5	202	259	0.780	3	9	0.333	7th–10th classification
5	Trinidad and Tobago	4	0	4	0	135	300	0.450	0	12	0.000	7th–10th classification

Date	Time		Score		Set 1	Set 2	Set 3	Set 4	Set 5	Total	Report
6 Jul	16:00	Mexico	3–0	Trinidad and Tobago	25–15	25–12	25–7			75–34	P2 P3
6 Jul	18:00	Colombia	0–3	United States	18–25	18–25	21–25			57–75	P2 P3
7 Jul	18:00	Trinidad and Tobago	0–3	United States	14–25	15–25	13–25			42–75	P2 P3
7 Jul	20:00	Puerto Rico	3–1	Colombia	25–21	26–24	23–25	25–20		99–90	P2 P3
8 Jul	16:00	Trinidad and Tobago	0–3	Puerto Rico	9–25	13–25	13–25			35–75	P2 P3
8 Jul	18:00	United States	3–0	Mexico	25–11	25–18	25–19			75–48	P2 P3
9 Jul	16:00	Trinidad and Tobago	0–3	Colombia	8–25	8–25	8–25			24–75	P2 P3
9 Jul	18:00	Mexico	0–3	Puerto Rico	16–25	21–25	9–25			46–75	P2 P3
10 Jul	16:00	Colombia	3–0	Mexico	25–8	25–11	25–14			75–33	P2 P3
10 Jul	18:00	United States	3–1	Puerto Rico	25–18	25–20	25–27	25–19		100–84	P2 P3

== Final round ==
=== Championship bracket ===
Quarterfinals
A2	Argentina	0
B3	Colombia	3
B2	Puerto Rico	3
A3	Canada	1

Semifinals
B1	United States	3
B3	Colombia	0
A1	Dominican Republic	3
B2	Puerto Rico	1
5th place
A3	Canada	1
A2	Argentina	3

Final
B1	United States	3
A1	Dominican Republic	0
3rd place
B3	Colombia	3
B2	Puerto Rico	0

=== 7th–10th places bracket ===
Classification 7–10
B4	Mexico	0
A5	Cuba	3
A4	Peru	3
B5	Trinidad and Tobago	0

7th place
A5	Cuba	0
A4	Peru	3
9th place
B4	Mexico	3
B5	Trinidad and Tobago	0

==== Classification 7th–10th ====
Date	Time		Score		Set 1	Set 2	Set 3	Set 4	Set 5	Total	Report
12 Jul	18:00	Mexico	0–3	Cuba	15–25	23–25	16–25			54–75	P2 P3
12 Jul	20:00	Peru	3–0	Trinidad and Tobago	25–15	25–10	25–14			75–39	P2 P3

==== Quarterfinals ====
Date	Time		Score		Set 1	Set 2	Set 3	Set 4	Set 5	Total	Report
12 Jul	18:00	Puerto Rico	3–1	Canada	30–28	13–25	27–25	26–24		96–102	P2 P3
12 Jul	20:00	Argentina	0–3	Colombia	16–25	16–25	19–25			51–75	P2 P3

==== 9th place match ====
Date	Time		Score		Set 1	Set 2	Set 3	Set 4	Set 5	Total	Report
13 Jul	18:00	Mexico	3–0	Trinidad and Tobago	25–17	25–13	25–8			75–38	P2 P3

==== 7th place match ====
Date	Time		Score		Set 1	Set 2	Set 3	Set 4	Set 5	Total	Report
13 Jul	20:00	Cuba	0–3	Peru	20–25	14–25	19–25			53–75	P2 P3

==== 5th place match ====
Date	Time		Score		Set 1	Set 2	Set 3	Set 4	Set 5	Total	Report
13 Jul	16:00	Canada	1–3	Argentina	20–25	23–25	26–24	20–25		89–99	P2 P3

==== Semifinals ====
Date	Time		Score		Set 1	Set 2	Set 3	Set 4	Set 5	Total	Report
13 Jul	18:00	United States	3–0	Colombia	25–17	25–14	25–15			75–46	P2 P3
13 Jul	20:00	Dominican Republic	3–1	Puerto Rico	25–16	25–20	27–29	25–20		102–85	P2 P3

==== 3rd place match ====
Date	Time		Score		Set 1	Set 2	Set 3	Set 4	Set 5	Total	Report
14 Jul	14:00	Colombia	3–0	Puerto Rico	25–21	25–19	25–21			75–61	P2 P3

==== Final ====
Date	Time		Score		Set 1	Set 2	Set 3	Set 4	Set 5	Total	Report
14 Jul	16:00	United States	3–0	Dominican Republic	25–16	25–21	29–27			79–64	P2 P3

== Final standing ==
Rank	Team
1st place, gold medalist(s)	United States
2nd place, silver medalist(s)	Dominican Republic
3rd place, bronze medalist(s)	Colombia
4	Puerto Rico
5	Argentina
6	Canada
7	Peru
8	Cuba
9	Mexico
10	Trinidad and Tobago
11	Guatemala

2019 Women's Pan-American Cup

United States
7th title

14-woman roster
Micha Hancock (c), Kathryn Plummer, Justine Wong-Orantes, Rachael Adams, Madison Kingdon, Gabrielle Curry, Madison Lilley,
Veronica Perry, Danielle Cuttino, Hannah Tapp, Brionne Butler, Kadie Rolfzen, Jenna Rosenthal, Karsta Lowe
Head coach
Robert Browning

== Individual awards ==
- Most valuable player
  (United States) Micha Hancock
- Best setter
  (United States) Micha Hancock
- Best outside hitters
  (United States) Kadie Rolfzen
  (Dominican Republic) Brayelin Martínez
- Best middle blockers
  (United States) Hannah Tapp
  (Colombia) Valerín Carabalí
- Best Opposite
  (Puerto Rico) Paulina Prieto
- Best scorer
  (Puerto Rico) Paulina Prieto
- Best server
  (Puerto Rico) Wilmarie Rivera
- Best libero
  (United States) Justine Wong-Orantes
- Best digger
  (Colombia) Camila Gómez
- Best receiver
  (United States) Justine Wong-Orantes
