= Hannah Tapp =

American volleyball player (born 1995)

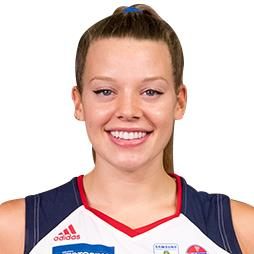
- Tapp in 2019

Personal information
- Nationality: American
- Born: June 21, 1995 (age 31)
- Hometown: Stewartville, Minnesota, U.S.
- Height: 191 cm (6 ft 3 in)
- Weight: 77 kg (170 lb)
- Spike: 32 1cm
- Block: 290 cm (114 in)
- Education: Minnesota

Volleyball information
- Position: Middle Blocker
- Current club: San Diego Mojo
- Number: 8

Career
| Years | Teams |
|---|---|
| 2013–2016 | USA Minnesota |
| 2016–2017 | GER SSC Palmberg Schwerin |
| 2017–2018 | ITA Il Bisonte Firenze |
| 2018–2019 | ITA Zanetti Bergamo |
| 2019–2023 | JPN Hitachi Rivale |
| 2024 | USA San Diego Mojo |

National team
| 2017–2022 | United States |
Medal record
Indoor Volleyball
Representing the United States
FIVB World Cup
| Silver medal – second place | 2019 Japan |
Pan-American Cup
| Gold medal – first place | 2019 Trujillo/Chiclayo |
NORCECA Championship
| Silver medal – second place | 2019 San Juan |

Hannah Bailey Tapp (born June 21, 1995) is an American former volleyball player who played in the middle blocker position.

== Personal life ==
Tapp grew up in Stewartville, Minnesota. She graduated from Stewartville High School in 2013. In addition to volleyball, she also played basketball and was a track & field athlete in high school. She has an identical twin sister, Paige, who also played volleyball for Minnesota and the U.S. national team.

== Career ==
=== College ===
Tapp played collegiately for Minnesota. She had 978 kills and 551 career blocks, with an overall total of 1,273 points throughout her career. She was named an AVCA 1st Team All-American in 2015 and a 2nd Team All-American in 2016.

Tapp graduated Minnesota with a degree in management in 2017. She was a finalist for the Senior CLASS Award in volleyball.

=== Professional clubs ===
Tapp has played professionally in Germany, Italy and Japan, and finished her career in the United States for the Pro Volleyball Federation's San Diego Mojo.

=== USA national team ===
Tapp made her debut with U.S. Women's National Team at the 2017 FIVB World Grand Prix. She was named "Best Middle Blocker" at the 2019 Pan American Cup after helping lead team USA to its third consecutive gold medal, recording five blocks and four kills in the championship match victory versus the Dominican Republic.

== Awards and honors ==
=== College ===
- AVCA Second Team All-American (2016)
- AVCA First Team All-American (2015)
- Big Ten All-Freshman team (2013)

=== International ===
- 2019 Pan-American Cup – Best Middle Blocker
