= Cassidy Lichtman =

American volleyball player (born 1989)

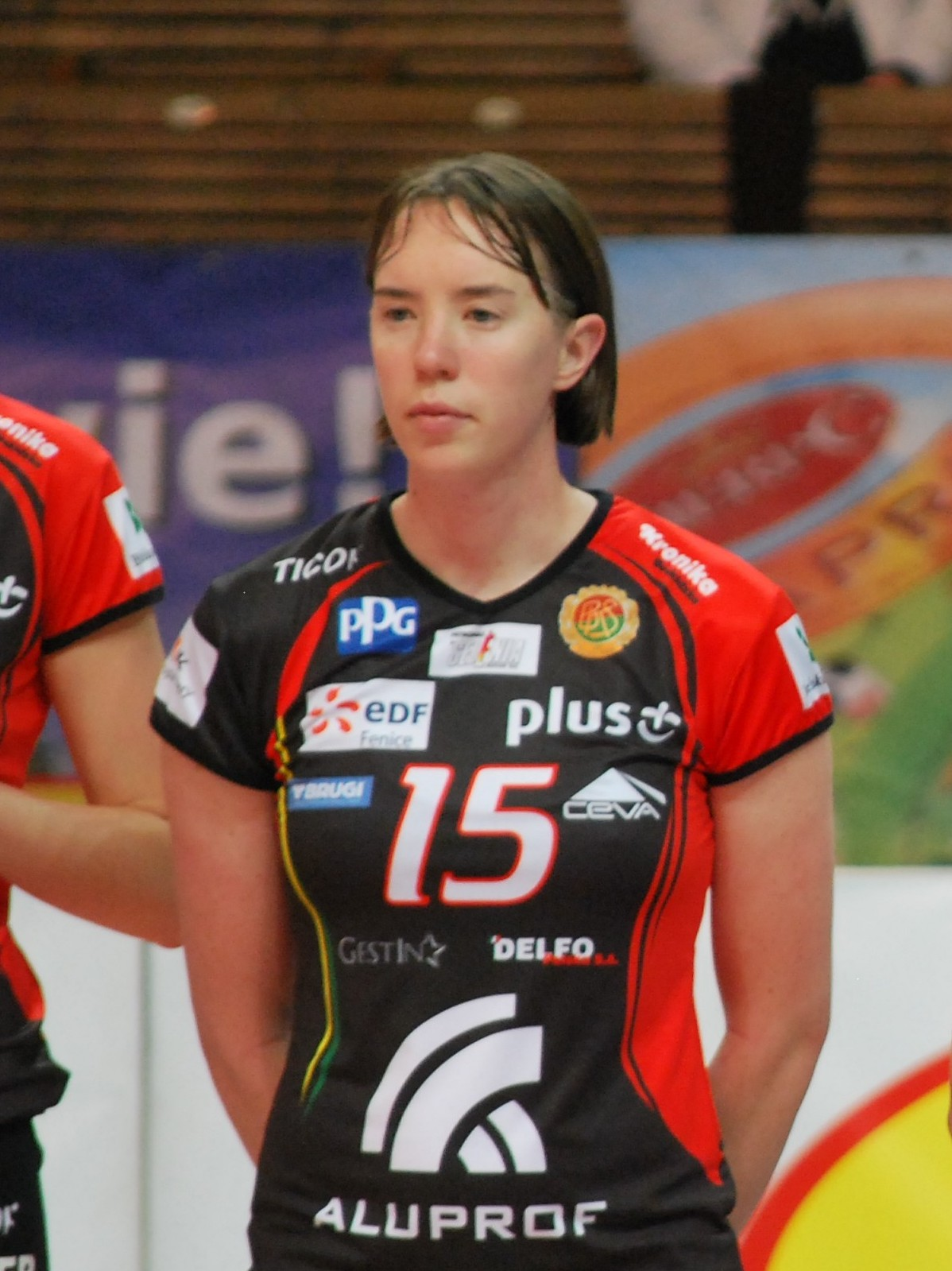
- Lichtman in 2012

Personal information
- Nationality: American
- Born: May 25, 1989 (age 37)
- Hometown: Poway, California; United States
- Height: 6 ft 1 in (185 cm)
- Weight: 150 lb (68 kg)
- Spike: 118 in (299 cm)
- Block: 110 in (279 cm)
- Education: Stanford

Volleyball information
- Position: Outside hitter
- Current club: (United States) Athletes Unlimited
- Number: 8

Career
Years	Teams
2014	Sichuan Women's Volleyball
2021–2022	Athletes Unlimited

National team
2014	United States

Cassidy Lichtman (born May 25, 1989) is an American female volleyball player. She was part of the United States women's national volleyball team from 2011 to 2016.

== Professional career ==
She participated in the 2014 FIVB Volleyball World Grand Prix, the 2011 and 2015 Pan American Games and the 2012, 2013, 2014 and 2015 PanAmerican Cups. On the club level she played for five years in Poland, Switzerland, Azerbaijan, France and China, ending with Sichuan Women's Volleyball in 2015.

In 2021 Lichtman came out of retirement to become a founding member in the first season of Athletes Unlimited Pro Volleyball. She played in the first two seasons of the new league, earning a medal with a fourth place finish in Season 2. During this time she was also the first athlete to sit on the Board of Directors of Athletes Unlimited.

In 2022, Lichtman retired from competition and became the Director of Volleyball for Athletes Unlimited. She was named one of AdWeek's Most Powerful Women in Sports in 2022.

== College career ==
Lichtman graduated from Stanford in 2011 with a BA in political science and an MA in history. She received both degrees in only four years while also playing for the Stanford Women's Volleyball Team. She played multiple positions including outside hitter and setter. Her teams won four Pac10 Championships and Lichtman was named a first team AVCA All-American in both her junior and senior seasons. She was also named to the first team Academic All-American.

After retiring from the US National Team in 2016, Lichtman returned to Stanford as an assistant coach during the 2016 season when Stanford Volleyball won the National Championship.

== Later career ==
After retiring from the National Team, Lichtman worked for former US Chief Technology Officer, Megan Smith, at shift7.

In 2019, she was elected to the Board of Directors of USA Volleyball In 2020 she started the nonprofit P/ATH, which works within the sports world to better develop skills around empathy and empowerment. In 2026 she was elected as the Chair of the Board for USA Volleyball, becoming the first athlete and youngest woman elected to the position for USA Volleyball and the youngest active Board Chair in the Olympic movement.

== Early life ==
At age nine, Lichtman was told she would likely never walk again due to a chronic pain disorder in her leg. She began to walk on her own and dealt with this pain throughout her entire athletic career. She was inspired to pursue a career in volleyball at the age of 9 when she saw the Francis Parker School varsity volleyball team win the state championship. When the team won the championship she stated, “Yeah, I want to do that.”

Lichtman graduated from Francis Parker School in San Diego in 2007.
