= Karsta Lowe =

American volleyball player

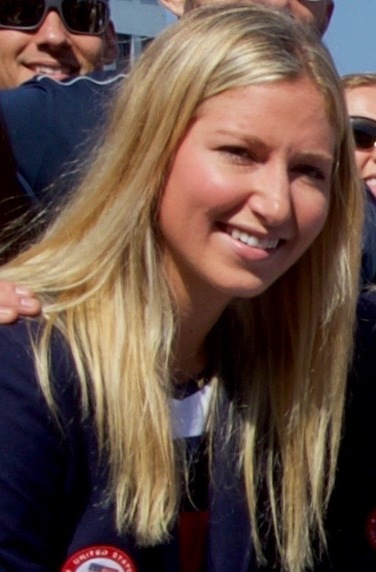
- Lowe in 2016

Personal information
- Full name: Karsta Frances Lowe
- Born: February 2, 1993 (age 33); San Diego, California, U.S.
- Hometown: Rancho Santa Fe, California, U.S.
- Height: 6 ft 4 in (193 cm)
- Weight: 181 lb (82 kg)
- Spike: 124 in (315 cm)
- Block: 120 in (305 cm)
- Education: UCLA

Volleyball information
- Position: Opposite
- Number: 25 (national team); 17 (UCLA)

Career
Years	Teams
2014–2015	(Puerto Rico) Changas de Naranjito
2015–2016	(Italy) Futura Busto Arsizio
2016–2017	(China) Beijing BAIC Motors
2018–2019	(Italy) Imoco Volley Conegliano
2019–2020	(Italy) Futura Busto Arsizio
2021–2022	(United States) Athletes Unlimited
2022–2023	(Japan) JT Marvelous
2023–2024	(Indonesia) Jakarta Livin' Mandiri

National team
2015–2020	United States
Medal record
Volleyball
Olympic Games
Bronze medal – third place	2016 Rio de Janeiro	Team
World Cup
Silver medal – second place	2019 Japan	Team
Bronze medal – third place	2015 Japan	Team
NORCECA Championship
Silver medal – second place	2019 San Juan	Team
FIVB World Grand Prix
Gold medal – first place	2015 Omaha	Team
Silver medal – second place	2016 Bangkok	Team
Pan-American Cup
Gold medal – first place	2019 Trujillo/Chiclayo

Karsta Frances Lowe (born February 2, 1993) is an American former volleyball player who was a first-team All-American at UCLA and who played for the United States women's national volleyball team. With the national team, she won the gold medal at the 2015 FIVB World Grand Prix, and was honored as the Most Valuable Player. She also won bronze medals at the 2015 FIVB World Cup and the 2016 Rio Olympics. She has played professionally in Puerto Rico, Italy, China, Japan, and Indonesia.

== Career ==
=== College ===
Lowe played college women's volleyball at UCLA. In 2014, she was selected as an AVCA first-team All-American.

=== International ===
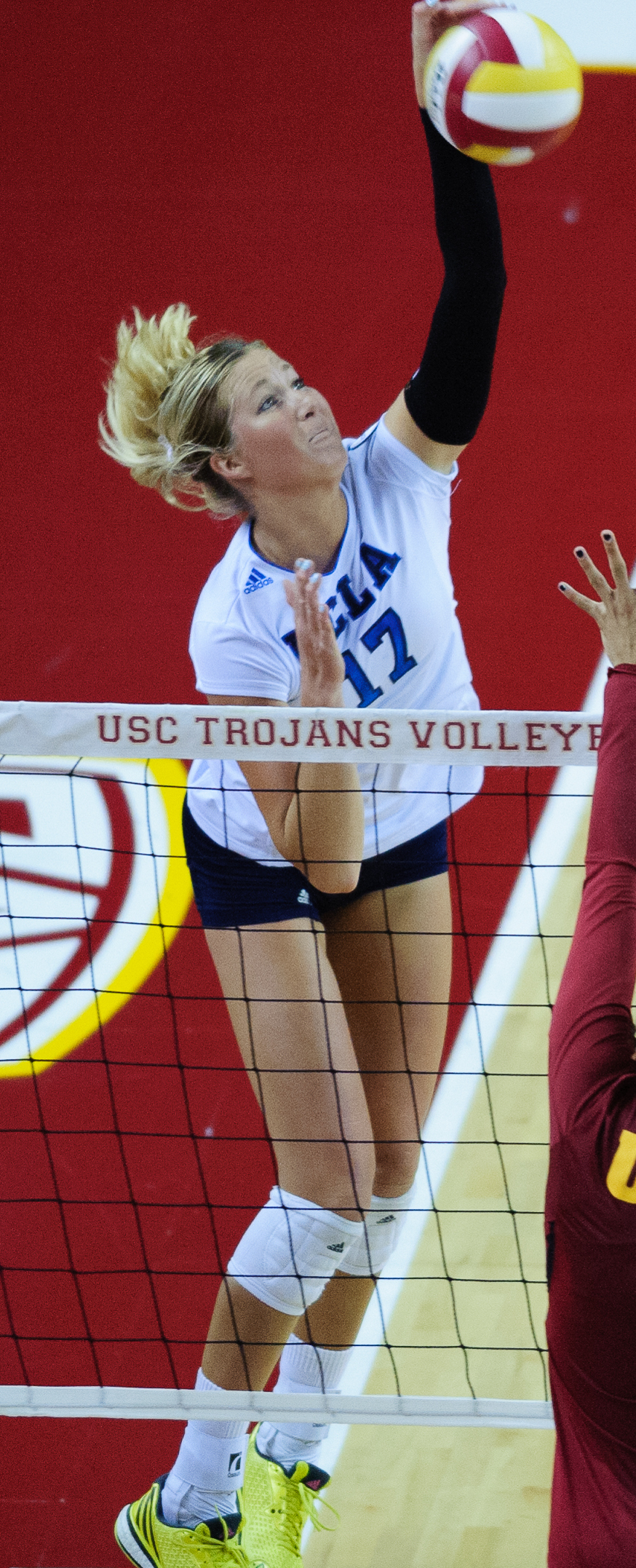
Lowe playing for UCLA

Lowe was a member of the United States women's national volleyball team that won the gold medal at the 2015 FIVB World Grand Prix, and she was awarded Most Valuable Player of the tournament. She also won bronze medals at the 2015 World Cup and at the 2016 Rio Summer Olympics.

By 2019, she played for Imoco Volley in Italy. In February–March 2021, she participated in the inaugural season of Athletes Unlimited, a professional volleyball league in the United States. She finished fifth among all scorers with 3,566 total points.

Lowe played with Japanese club JT Marvelous in the 2022–23 season.

== Personal life ==
After the 2016 Summer Olympics, Lowe went back to school, earning a partial master's in Landscape Architecture from the University of Southern California.

In 2022, Lowe took part in a TED Talk video presentation in which she shares her struggle with mental health and how she has found healing. She made the video to encourage those with mental health problems.

Awards
Preceded by (Japan) Yūko Sano	Most Valuable Player of FIVB World Grand Prix; 2015	Succeeded by (Brazil) Natália Pereira
