= Alan Patricof =

American venture capitalist (born 1934)

Alan J. Patricof
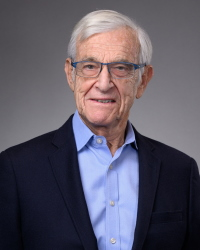
- Born: October 22, 1934 (age 92); New York City, U.S.
- Education: Ohio State University (BSBA); Columbia University (MBA)
- Known for: Co-founder of Apax Partners; Founder of Greycroft Partners
- Spouses: Bette Hollander (m. 1958; div.); Susan Hatkoff (m. 1970; died 2021); Barbara Guggenheim (m. 2023)
- Children: 3
- Relatives: Craig Hatkoff (former brother-in-law)

Alan Patricof (born October 22, 1934) is an American venture capitalist. He founded Patricof & Co. Ventures in 1969 and raised his first fund, Alan Patricof Associates, the following year. Through a 1977 transatlantic partnership the firm became a predecessor of the private equity firm Apax Partners. He was the original lead investor in New York magazine and served as chairman of its parent company, and was an early-stage investor in Apple and AOL.

Patricof founded Greycroft Partners in 2006 and co-founded Primetime Partners, a fund focused on products and services for older adults, in 2020. He has served on federal boards under three presidents, including the Millennium Challenge Corporation from 2007 to 2012 and the Securities Investor Protection Corporation since 2022, and has been active in Democratic Party politics since the early 1990s, later becoming one of the party's leading financial supporters. France awarded him the Légion d'honneur in 2020 for his part in introducing venture capital there. He published a memoir, No Red Lights, in 2022.

== Early life and education ==
Patricof grew up on the Upper West Side of Manhattan, the son of a stockbroker; his parents had emigrated from Russia to the United States. He has recalled playing stickball in the streets and selling The Saturday Evening Post in the subway as a boy. He is of Jewish descent.

He graduated from Horace Mann School for Boys in 1952, and received the school's Distinguished Achievement Award in 2003. He completed a bachelor's degree in business administration at Ohio State University in three years, graduating in 1955, and earned an M.B.A. from Columbia University in 1957 while working full-time as an analyst at an investment firm.

== Career ==
=== Early career and New York magazine ===
Patricof found his first full-time job by calling at offices along Wall Street and asking whether there were any openings; he was hired by the investment counseling firm Naess & Thomas, where he stayed about two years. He left in 1958 to serve six months of active duty in the United States Army at Fort Dix, New Jersey, and on returning to New York joined Lambert & Company, where he worked on development capital. He then joined Central National Corporation, a private firm that managed the Gottesman family's pulp and paper fortune, where he was assistant vice president and later vice president from 1960 to 1968.

Patricof found the investors who financed the launch of New York magazine, which Clay Felker and Milton Glaser founded in 1968, and later became chairman of the board of its parent, the New York Magazine Company. He also took part in the founding of the Datascope Corporation and LIN Broadcasting Corporation. In 1969 New York magazine was merged with Tarrytown House, a Westchester conference center, under a newly formed holding company called Aeneid Equities, of which Patricof was president; the offering was announced in May and completed that September, when 200,000 Class A shares were sold to the public at $10 each.

The company acquired The Village Voice in 1974 and launched New West in Los Angeles in 1976. In January 1977 Rupert Murdoch moved to take control of the company by buying the stake held by Carter Burden; Felker sued to block the purchase, and the parties settled on January 7, with Felker resigning as president and editor. Patricof, then chairman of the board, sided with Murdoch. After the magazine's staff stopped work in support of Felker, Patricof, Murdoch and several other directors produced the next issue themselves, pasting up proofs and working through the night at the typesetters to meet the printer's deadline.

=== Patricof & Co. and Apax Partners ===
Patricof founded Patricof & Co. Ventures in 1969, and the following year raised his first fund, Alan Patricof Associates. The firm began with $2.5 million under management and nine family investment offices as clients, and in 1975 he launched 53rd Street Ventures, a $10 million vehicle.

In 1977 Patricof formed a transatlantic partnership with Ronald Mourad Cohen in London and Maurice Tchénio in Paris, who five years earlier had founded the advisory firm Multinational Management Group. The international business, which by 1992 had offices in eight European cities, adopted the Apax Partners name in 1991; the American business continued to trade as Patricof & Co. until 2001, when it did the same.

Patricof invested in Apple in 1979, five years before the release of the first Macintosh, and in 1985 backed Quantum Computer Services, which was later renamed America Online. Other companies backed by the firm included Office Depot, Cadence Design Systems, Cellular Communications, FORE Systems and Audible. As the firm moved into leveraged buyouts it became a significant force in Europe, acquiring Yellow Pages in 2001 and, in 2005, the Danish telecommunications company TDC for $15.3 billion, then the largest leveraged buyout in European history.

Patricof stepped back from the day-to-day management of Apax in 2004 to concentrate on smaller venture investments.

=== Greycroft ===
In 2006, at the age of 71, Patricof co-founded Greycroft Partners with Dana Settle and Ian Sigalow, returning to early-stage investing in digital media, with offices in New York and Los Angeles. Fortune reported in 2017 that the firm managed just under $1.1 billion and had generated roughly $400 million in realized gains for its investors across thirty profitable exits.

Greycroft participated in a $5 million first round for The Huffington Post, which AOL acquired six years later for $315 million. Its other exits included the sale of Buddy Media to Salesforce for $800 million in 2012, Maker Studios to Disney for $675 million in 2014, Trunk Club to Nordstrom for $350 million in 2014, and Plated to Albertsons for $300 million in 2017. The firm also held an early position in Venmo, which it sold in 2013 for $27 million, a decision its partners have described as premature. Later investments included the podcast producer Wondery, acquired by Amazon in 2021, and the news outlet Axios, acquired by Cox Enterprises in 2022. Patricof is Greycroft's chairman emeritus.

=== Primetime Partners ===
In 2020 Patricof co-founded Primetime Partners with Abby Miller Levy, a former SoulCycle executive and founding president of Thrive Global. The firm launched with a $32 million fund and invests in early-stage companies serving older adults, as well as in older entrepreneurs. Patricof, who was 85 at its founding, has described the venture as the third chapter of his career.

== Public service ==
Patricof's nomination by President Joe Biden to the board of the Securities Investor Protection Corporation was confirmed by the Senate on December 20, 2022; he serves on the board's audit and budget committee. He was earlier nominated by President George W. Bush in 2007 to the board of the Millennium Challenge Corporation and renominated by President Barack Obama in 2010, serving two terms through 2012, and sat on the board of the President's Global Development Council during Obama's second term. From 1993 to 1995, during the Clinton administration, he chaired the White House Conference on Small Business Commission.

In 2001 Patricof reduced his commercial commitments to work on entrepreneurship in developing countries. He has advised the International Finance Corporation, the commercial arm of the World Bank, and has served on the boards of the nonprofits TechnoServe and Trickle Up, the UNDP Commission on Private Sector and Development, the Africa policy board of the Council on Foreign Relations, the advisory board of the African Venture Capital Association and the Nigerian Honorary International Investor Council. He was vice chairman of the Commission on Increasing Capital Flows to Africa. He is a member of the Council on Foreign Relations.

== Political activity ==
A former supporter of Ronald Reagan, Patricof became involved in Democratic politics in the early 1990s after meeting Bill Clinton through a mutual acquaintance in East Hampton. He chaired Entrepreneurs for Clinton during the 1992 campaign, a role he described at the time as recruiting business figures to endorse Clinton publicly rather than raising money; he said then that he was not a large contributor himself. He later served as finance chairman of Hillary Clinton's 2000 Senate campaign in New York and bundled contributions for her presidential campaigns.

During the 2004 Democratic primaries Patricof was among the leading fundraisers for Wesley Clark. He was also a contributor to Americans for Jobs, Health Care and a Progressive Future, a group that ran advertisements attacking Howard Dean in the weeks before the Iowa caucuses and which did not disclose its donors until after the vote. After John Kerry secured the nomination, Patricof hosted a fundraiser for him at his East Hampton home in August 2004.

In the 2008 primaries Patricof supported Clinton against Obama. He was one of twenty major Democratic donors who signed a March 2008 letter to Speaker Nancy Pelosi objecting to her position that superdelegates should follow the pledged-delegate count, a letter widely read as a warning that the signatories' support for House Democrats was conditional. Pelosi did not alter her position.

Patricof returned to active fundraising in 2014, hosting a Democratic National Committee event with President Obama at his home at which twenty-six donors each contributed $32,500; he described the gathering to contributors as a way of strengthening the party ahead of a possible second Clinton candidacy. He publicly defended the Clintons against criticism of the speaking fees they received from financial firms. He and his wife bundled at least $100,000 for Clinton's 2016 campaign, and he was among roughly eighty top bundlers who met with her in Washington in June 2016.

Following the 2016 election Patricof became an outspoken critic of President Donald Trump, saying he would do whatever he legally could to help elect a Democratic Congress. In 2018 he was among the financiers behind the House Victory Project, a joint fundraising committee supporting Democratic candidates in competitive House districts; he contributed $54,000, and the committee transferred approximately $2.2 million to campaigns in a single quarter of that cycle. In September 2019 he became one of the first major venture capital donors to endorse Biden for president, and he stayed with the campaign through its early primary losses the following February.

In June 2010 the FBI arrested ten people as part of the Illegals Program, a Russian intelligence operation. The criminal complaint said that one of the accused, who used the name Cynthia Murphy, had been assigned the account of an unnamed New York financier described as prominent in politics and a friend of a Cabinet official, and that her handlers in Moscow had directed her to develop the relationship beyond professional matters. Politico identified the financier as Patricof, and Patricof, who was not accused of any wrongdoing, told The Washington Post that he believed he was the financier in question. He said the only conversations he had with Ms. Murphy never touched on government or politics, but the more mundane matters of bills and taxes. "It's just staggering," he told The Post. "It's off the charts."

== Other activities ==
=== Writing ===
In 2022 Patricof published No Red Lights: Reflections on Life, 50 Years in Venture Capital, and Never Driving Alone (Post Hill Press), a memoir covering his career in venture capital, government, philanthropy, the arts and politics. In a profile published in The Wall Street Journal around its release, Emily Bobrow noted that Patricof discussed his misses alongside his successes, among them passing on an early opportunity to invest in Starbucks.

Patricof has written on venture capital and tax policy. In a 1988 opinion piece in The New York Times he argued that the Tax Reform Act of 1986 had discouraged individuals from backing early-stage companies, and proposed targeted tax credits and a lower rate on gains from such investments to draw them back. In an August 2016 op-ed for the same paper, titled "Close My Tax Loophole," he called on fund managers to accept the taxation of carried interest as ordinary income, arguing that the capital gains rate was intended for investors risking their own money and that a general partner rarely does so. He is a member of the Patriotic Millionaires, a group advocating higher taxes on high earners.

=== Boards ===
Patricof has served on the board of the Brooklyn Academy of Music. He was treasurer and a member of the board of governors of the New York Academy of Sciences for more than ten years, and chaired the Actors Studio division of New School University. He is a board member of the Fortune Society and of the finance committee of the Northside Center for Child Development in Harlem, and an emeritus member of the board of overseers of Columbia Business School.

== Awards and honors ==
Patricof received the Horace Mann School Distinguished Achievement Award in 2003. In November 2020 the French ambassador to the United States, Philippe Étienne, presented him with the Légion d'honneur in recognition of his role in introducing venture capital to France in the early 1980s.

In 2023 the National Venture Capital Association named him to the inaugural class of its Venture Vanguard Award, alongside Brad Feld, Jan Garfinkle and Mary Meeker. The same year, Ohio State University's Max M. Fisher College of Business gave him its Distinguished Alumni Leadership Award. In 2025 New York Road Runners presented him with a Legacy Award.

== Personal life ==
In 1958 Patricof married Bette Hollander; they had one child, Mark F. Patricof, born in 1964, who married Martha Shelburne Jones, a daughter of Bishop Edward Witker Jones of the Episcopal Diocese of Indianapolis. The marriage ended in divorce.

In 1970 he married Susan Hatkoff, a sister of Craig Hatkoff. They had two sons, Jon Patricof, born in 1973, and Jamie Patricof, born in 1976. Susan Patricof, who led the Northside Center for Child Development in Harlem for more than forty years as its president and board chair, died on January 18, 2021; the Susan Patricof Head Start Center in East Harlem, opened in 2005, is named for her. On December 10, 2023, Patricof married the art dealer Barbara Guggenheim in New York City.

He keeps homes in Manhattan and East Hampton Village.

=== Distance running ===
Patricof ran the first New York City Marathon in 1970 and the first five-borough edition in 1976, and was still running competitively when profiled in 1992. At the age of 88 he was the oldest of the 2022 race's 47,839 finishers, completing the course in 8 hours 50 minutes 40 seconds alongside his son Jamie after training with a coach for much of the preceding year. He had attended Burning Man for the first time earlier that year.
