= Jamie Patricof =

American film producer

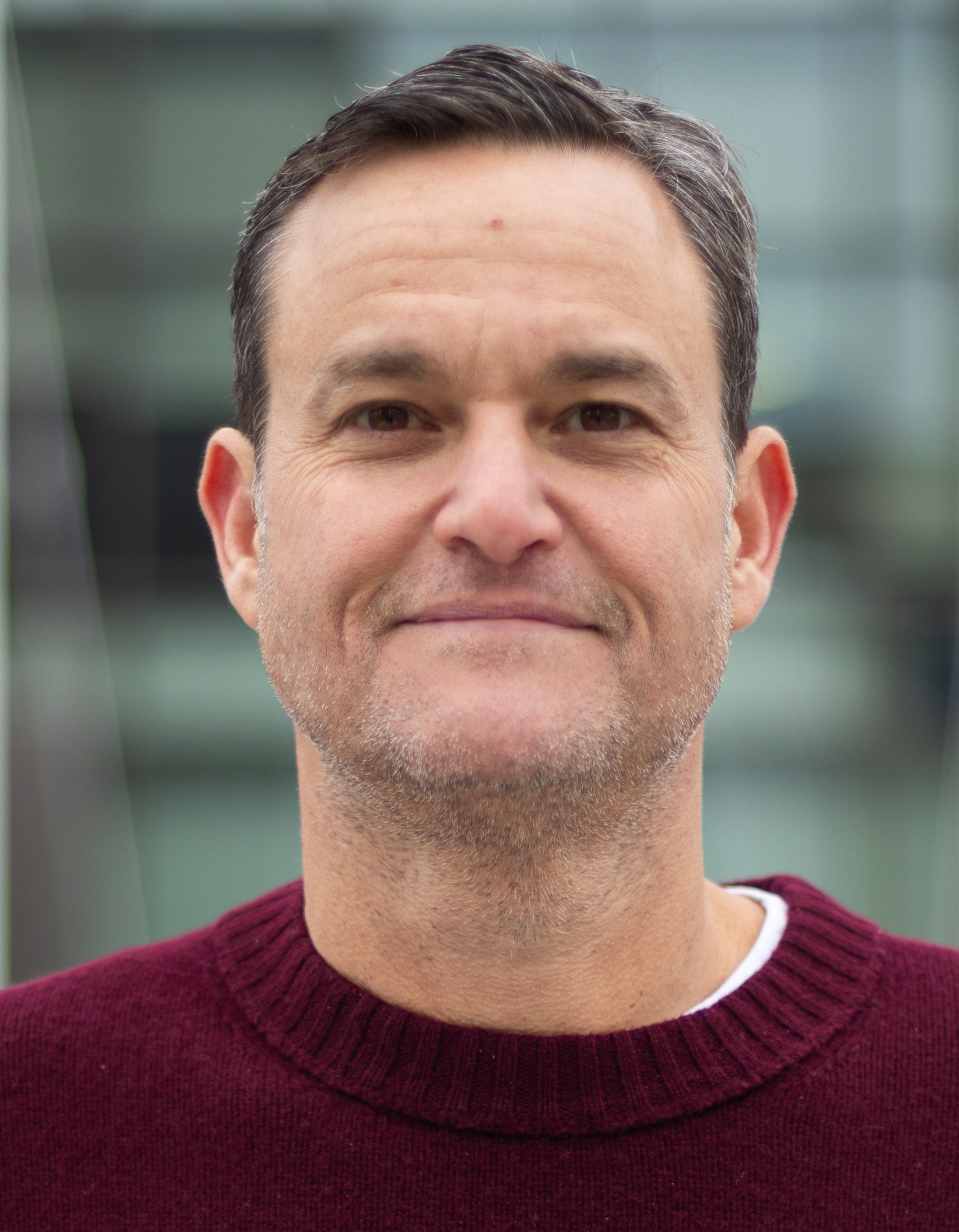
- Patricof in 2025
- Born: James Douglas Patricof; New York City, US
- Occupation: Businessman
- Spouse: Kelly Sawyer Patricof
- Children: 2
- Parent: Alan Patricof

Jamie Patricof is a movie and television producer and co-founder of Electric City Entertainment and Hunting Lane Films.

== Early life ==
Born to Jewish parents, Jamie Patricof is the son of Alan Patricof, and Edythe Susan Patricof, sister of Craig Hatkoff. Patricof grew up in New York City, and attended both The Collegiate School and The Fieldston School. He has two brothers, Jon Patricof, who is the President of the New York City FC, and Mark Patricof, founder of Patricof Co. and former managing director at Houlihan Lokey.

== Career ==
Jamie Patricof is a founder of Hunting Lane Films, a production company based in Los Angeles. He was involved in the following productions:

- I Know This Much Is True, 2020
- The After Party, 2018
- The Zookeeper's Wife, 2017
- Captain Fantastic, 2016.
- The Accountant. 2016 (executive producer)
- Mississippi Grind, 2015 (co-producer with Anna Boden and Ryan Fleck)
- Big Eyes, 2014 (co-produced with The Weinstein Company)
- The Place Beyond the Pines, 2012 (with Derek Cianfrance)
- Blue Valentine, 2010 (with Derek Cianfrance)
- Patricof also co-produced Half Nelson, with Fleck and Boden, produced Little Birds, and Sugar, the sophomore feature from Ryan Fleck & Anna Boden. Patricof was also recently an Executive Producer on Gavin O’Connor's film The Accountant.

Patricof's documentary projects include Us Kids (2020), Q Ball (2019), Levitated Mass (2013), Confessions of a Superhero (2007), THE OFFSEASON (2014), and three documentaries for ESPN's 30 for 30 series: Straight Outta LA (2010), The Day The Series Stopped (2014), and Sole Man (2009), directed by Jon Weinbach & Dan Marks.

== Family life ==
Jamie is married to Kelly Sawyer Patricof, who was born in London but raised in Vancouver, British Columbia, Canada. Kelly is the co-founder of the non profit Baby2Baby.
