= Brighton High School (Cottonwood Heights, Utah) =

Location
- 2220 East Bengal Boulevard; Cottonwood Heights, Utah 84121; United States; 40°36′44″N 111°49′37″W

Information
- Founded: 1969
- School district: Canyons School District
- Principal: Marielle Rawle
- Teaching staff: 92.14 (FTE)
- Grades: 9–12
- Enrollment: 2,393 (2023–2024)
- Student to teacher ratio: 25.97
- Colors: Blue, orange and white
- Mascot: Bengal Tiger
- Website: Official website

Brighton High School in Cottonwood Heights, Utah is located about ten miles (16 km) south of Salt Lake City. It serves students in grades 9-12 for the Canyons School District.

== Notable alumni ==
- Jackson Barton - NFL offensive tackle
- Cody Barton - NFL linebacker
- Dani Drews - professional volleyball player and member of U.S. national team.
- Simi Fehoko - NFL wide receiver
- Bryan Kehl - former NFL linebacker
- Reno Mahe - former NFL running back
- Sean Overholt - former Chicago Cubs pitcher
- Trevor Lewis - NHL player
