= Jon Patricof =

American businessman

- Born: 1973 (age 52–53); New York City, US
- Education: Harvard University; Harvard Business School (MBA)
- Occupation: Businessman
- Known for: President of New York City FC
- Spouse: Victoria Ann Radford
- Parent(s): Susan Hatkoff Patricoff; Alan Patricof

Jon Patricof (born 1973) is an American businessman and former president of New York City FC. Before joining New York City FC, he was president and chief operating officer of Tribeca Enterprises. which oversees the Tribeca Film Festival, Tribeca Film, and Tribeca Cinemas. Patricof co-founded Athletes Unlimited and is its CEO.

== Early life ==
Patricof is the son of Susan (née Hatkoff) and Alan Patricof. He has two brothers, Mark and Jamie Patricof.

== Career ==
Patricof joined Tribeca Enterprises in 2005 as chief operating officer. He oversaw the development of the Tribeca Film Festival, which was established in 2002, into one of the most prestigious festivals in the world. In 2014, Tribeca Enterprises sold a 50% stake in the Tribeca Film Festival to Madison Square Garden.

On January 6, 2016 it was announced that Patricof would become the third president of New York City FC, taking over the position from Tom Glick.

== Personal life ==
He is married to Victoria Ann Radford of New York. They have three children.
