= Athletes Unlimited =

Women's professional sports organization

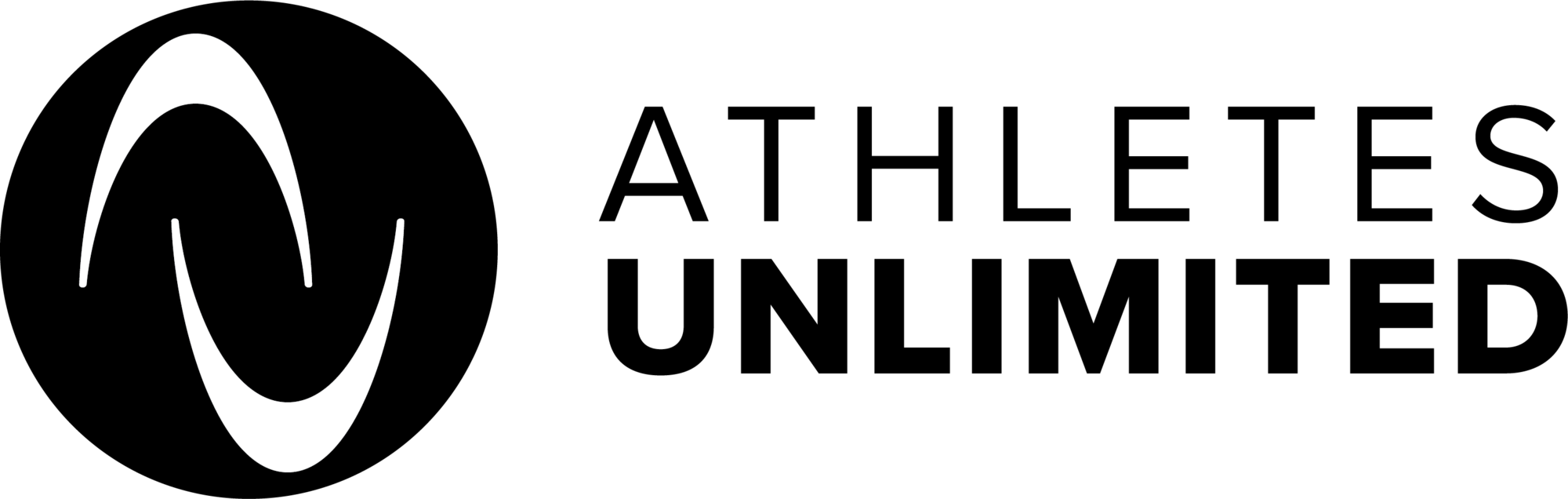
- Founded: 2020
- Founder: Jon Patricof; Jonathan Soros
- Broadcasters: ESPN (all); FanDuel (basketball and volleyball); MLB Network; (softball); WNBA (basketball); VBTV (volleyball)
- Website: auprosports.com

Athletes Unlimited (also known by their abbreviation AU) is a group of women's professional sports in an organization based in the United States that organizes and administers competitions in the sports of basketball, softball, volleyball, and formerly lacrosse. It was founded in 2020 by Jon Patricof and Jonathan Soros. Athletes Unlimited leagues employ formats in which individual players are crowned champions, with the exception of the Athletes Unlimited Softball League (AUSL), which has traditional teams.

== History ==
Athletes Unlimited was founded by Jon Patricof and Jonathan Soros in 2020.

== Format ==
There are no team owners, and league investors are capping their returns. Athletes share in the league profits, and are involved in the daily decision making. Players are not committed to one team but switch teams every week of the season through a draft. The top four players who earned the most points each week become captains for the next week and form new teams. Players earn points based on both their team and individual performances, and are ranked accordingly. The champion is the player with the most points at the end of the season.

== Leagues ==
=== Basketball ===
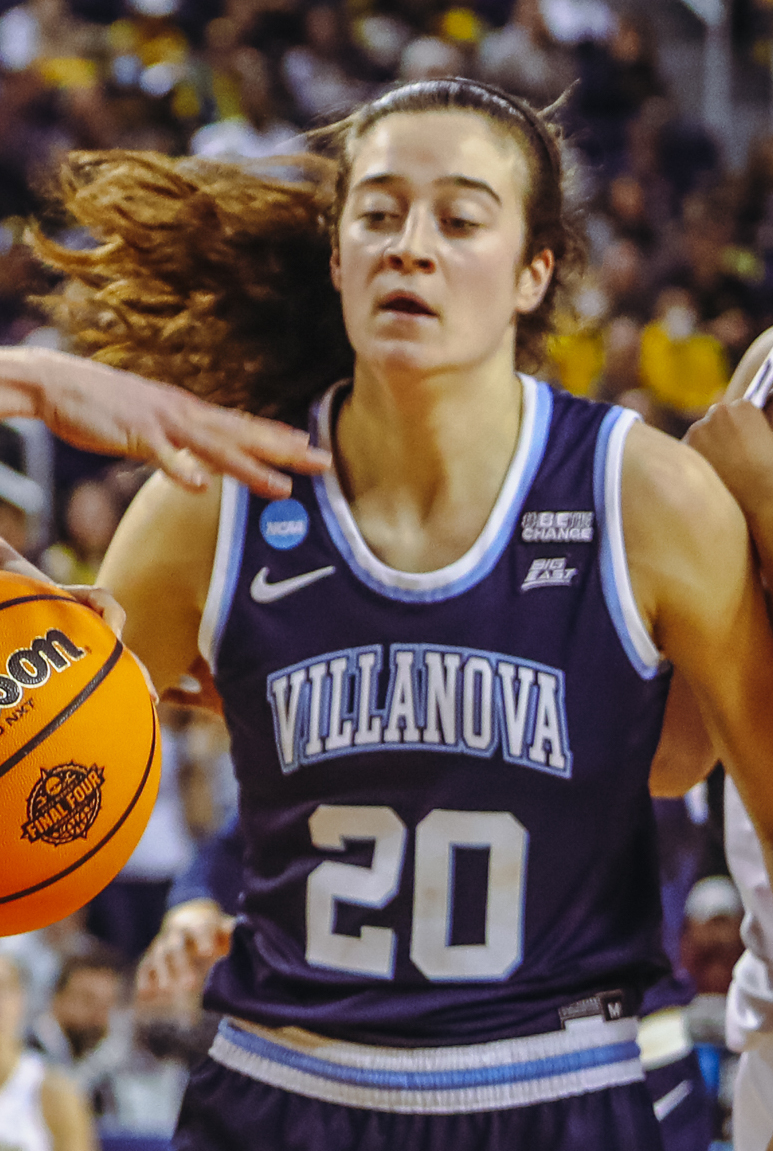
2025 champion Maddy Siegrist holds the all-time points record, at 7,052.

Athletes Unlimited Pro Basketball is played annually during winter. Its first season featured 44 players competing in a five-week season from January 26 to February 26, 2022, and took place in Las Vegas, Nevada. The second season was played in Dallas, Texas and ran from February 22 to March 26, 2023. Over the course of the second season, athletes played three games per week, including one back-to-back each week. The 2025 edition was held on February 5 – March 2 at the Nashville Municipal Auditorium in Nashville, Tennessee. It featured 40 players competing in 24 games: 10 livestreamed on ESPN+, and 14 simultaneously livestreamed on both the FanDuel Sports Network and the WNBA's mobile app. It was won by Maddy Siegrist, who set an all-time record of 7,052 points. The 2026 season was also held in Nashville, featuring 40 athletes. For 2026, the league gave each team a new name instead of only referring to them by colors: Gold Rush (gold), Glow (orange), Rhythm (blue), and Eclipse (purple). All 24 games of the season were available on the ESPN app. In July 2026, it was announced that AU was pausing its 2027 basketball season.

Athletes Unlimited Pro Basketball editions
| Year | Date | Venue | Location | (gold) Champion | | Ref. |
| Year | Date | Venue | Location | Player | Points | Ref. |
|---|---|---|---|---|---|---|
| 2022 | Jan 26 – Feb 26 | Sport Center of Las Vegas | Enterprise, NV | Tianna Hawkins | 6,831 | |
| 2023 | Feb 22 – Mar 25 | Fair Park Coliseum | Dallas, TX | NaLyssa Smith | 6,811 | |
| 2024 | Feb 29 – Mar 23 | Fair Park Coliseum | Dallas, TX | Allisha Gray | 6,918 | |
| 2025 | Feb 5 – Mar 2 | Nashville Municipal Auditorium | Nashville, TN | Maddy Siegrist | 7,052 | |
| 2026 | Feb 4 – Mar 1 | Nashville Municipal Auditorium | Nashville, TN | Odyssey Sims | 6,764 | |

=== Softball ===
==== Athletes Unlimited Softball League ====
In June 2024, AU announced a new softball league, the Athletes Unlimited Softball League (AUSL), which would start in 2025. It featured four, 15-player teams (the Bandits, Blaze, Talons, and Volts) playing a 30-game season, and was in addition to the existing AU Pro Softball Championship Season.

==== All-Star Cup ====
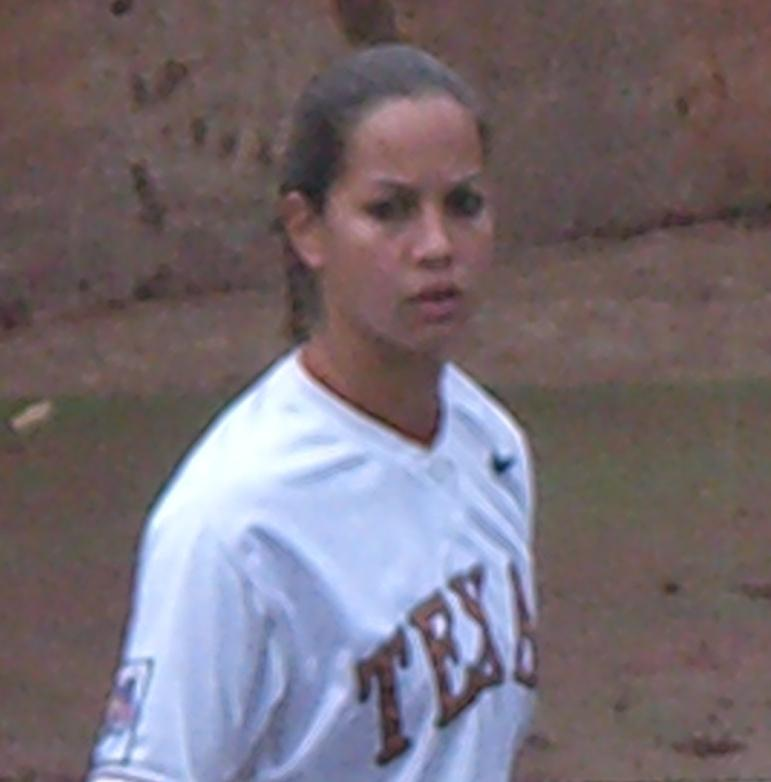
2020 champion Cat Osterman holds the all-time points record for the All-Star Cup, at 2,408.

The AUSL All-Star Cup (formerly known as Athletes Unlimited Pro Softball) is played annually at the Parkway Bank Sports Complex in Rosemont, Illinois, over four weeks during summer. The Cup's inaugural season was played from August 20 to September 28, 2020. Two games were played each Saturday, Sunday, and Monday over the five week period, 30 games all together (15 per player). The top four players were named the medalists, and Haylie McCleney was named the Defensive Player of the Year.

==== AUX ====
In 2022, AU added the Athletes Unlimited Pro Softball AUX (stylized as "AUX"), a two-and-a-half-week competition to precede the AUSL All-Star Cup. The inaugural AUX competition featured 42 athletes playing 18 games and took place from June 13 to 26, 2022, coinciding with the 50th anniversary of Title IX on June 23. Danielle O'Toole won the inaugural AUX softball competition with 1,436 points. Rachel Garcia won the 2023 AUX competition with 1,392 points. Bubba Nickles won the 2024 AUX competition with 1,344 points. The AUX competition was phased out following the arrival of the AUSL in 2025.

In July 2026, it was announced that AU was pausing the 2027 seasons both for its pro basketball and volleyball leagues, instead choosing to focus on softball.

Athletes Unlimited Pro Softball editions
| Year | Date | Venue | Location | (gold) Champion | | Ref. |
| Year | Date | Venue | Location | Player | Points | Ref. |
Athletes Unlimited Pro Softball / AUSL All-Star Cup
| 2020 | Aug 29 – Sep 28 | Parkway Bank Sports Complex | Rosemont, IL | Cat Osterman | 2,408 | |
| 2021 | Aug 28 – Sep 27 | Parkway Bank Sports Complex | Rosemont, IL | Aleshia Ocasio | 2,096 | |
| 2022 | Jul 29 – Aug 28 | Parkway Bank Sports Complex | Rosemont, IL | Dejah Mulipola | 1,782 | |
| 2023 | Jul 28 – Aug 27 | Parkway Bank Sports Complex | Rosemont, IL | Odicci Alexander | 1,994 | |
| 2024 | Jul 26 – Aug 5 | Parkway Bank Sports Complex | Rosemont, IL | Amanda Lorenz | 1,800 | |
| 2025 | Aug 2–31 | Parkway Bank Sports Complex | Rosemont, IL | Kayla Kowalik | 1,570 | |
| 2025 | Aug 2–31 | Ting Stadium | Holly Springs, NC | Kayla Kowalik | 1,570 | |
| 2025 | Aug 2–31 | Joyner Family Stadium | Greenville, NC | Kayla Kowalik | 1,570 | |
| 2026 | Aug 8–30 | Parkway Bank Sports Complex | Rosemont, IL | Lexi Kilfoyl | 1,072 | |
Athletes Unlimited Pro Softball AUX
| 2022 | Jun 13–25 | SDSU Softball Stadium | San Diego, CA | Danielle O'Toole | 1,436 | |
| 2023 | Jun 9–25 | Parkway Bank Sports Complex | Rosemont, IL | Rachel Garcia | 1,392 | |
| 2024 | Jun 10–25 | Wilkins Stadium | Wichita, KS | Bubba Nickles | 1,344 | |

=== Volleyball ===
In 2021, AU partnered with USA Volleyball to launch Athletes Unlimited Pro Volleyball (later called the AU Pro Volleyball Championship). The league acts like an "all-star showcase", in which 44 players divide into four player-selected teams that change on a weekly basis. The league uses an innovative statistical scoring system to highlight individual players' skills. The AU Pro Volleyball Championship is played annually—early in the year for its 2021 and 2022 seasons, and during the fall for its 2023, 2024, and 2025 seasons. Its inaugural season was played in February 2021. It received television and streaming coverage to over 100 countries via deals with ESPN International, CBC Sports of Canada, Great Britain's FreeSports, and Europe-based Setanta Sports. The first two seasons were held in Dallas, Texas, while the third and fourth seasons were in Mesa, Arizona. Season five was held in two locations: Omaha, Nebraska and Madison, Wisconsin.

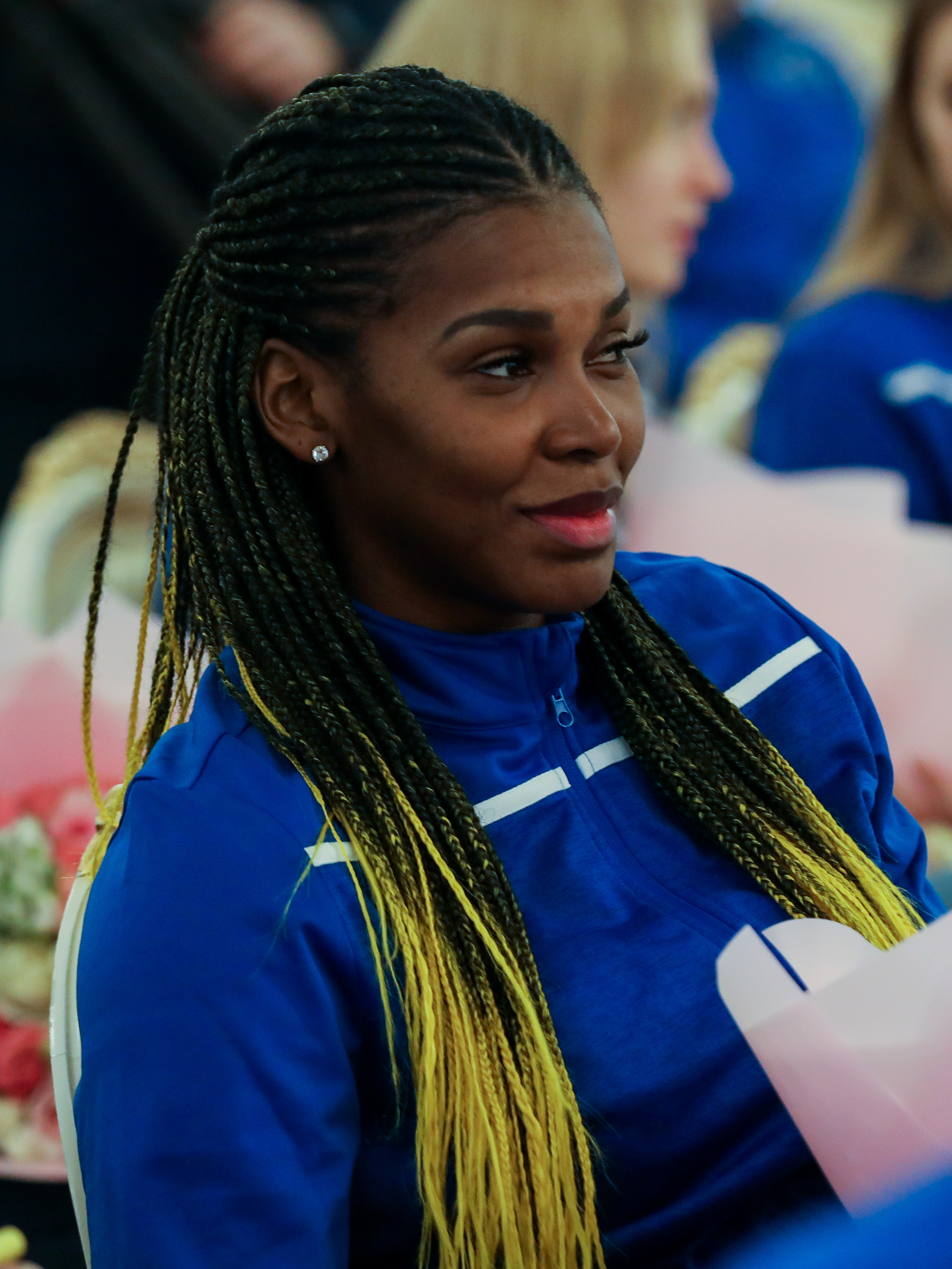
2022 champion Bethania de la Cruz holds the all-time points record, at 4,652.

In July 2026, it was announced that AU was pausing its 2026 and 2027 volleyball seasons to focus on its softball league.

Athletes Unlimited Pro Volleyball editions
| Year | Date | Venue | Location | (gold) Champion | | Ref. |
| Year | Date | Venue | Location | Player | Points | Ref. |
|---|---|---|---|---|---|---|
| 2021 | Feb 27 – Mar 29 | Fair Park Coliseum | Dallas, TX | Jordan Larson | 4,569 | |
| 2022 | Mar 16 – Apr 16 | Fair Park Coliseum | Dallas, TX | Bethania de la Cruz | 4,652 | |
| 2023 | Oct 6 – Nov 6 | Arizona Athletic Grounds | Mesa, AZ | Leah Edmond | 4,313 | |
| 2024 | Oct 3 – Nov 4 | Arizona Athletic Grounds | Mesa, AZ | Brittany Abercrombie | 4,521 | |
| 2025 | Oct 1 – Nov 2 | Liberty First Credit Union Arena | Ralson, NE | Jordan Thompson | 3,563 | |
| 2025 | Oct 1 – Nov 2 | Alliant Energy Center | Madison, WI | Jordan Thompson | 3,563 | |

== Defunct leagues ==
=== Lacrosse ===
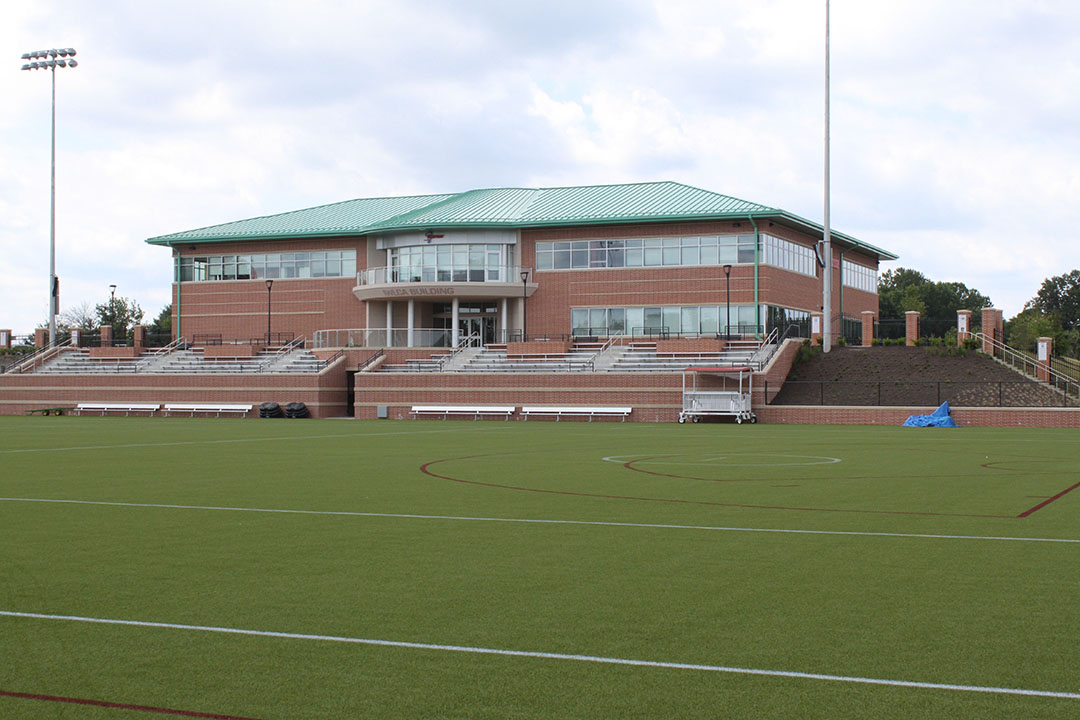
Tierney Field at the USA Lacrosse Headquarters in Sparks, Maryland, hosted three editions of Athletes Unlimited Pro Lacrosse.

Athletes Unlimited Pro Lacrosse was played annually during the summer, between 2021 and 2024. Michelle DeJulius, who had founded and was the CEO of the now defunct Women's Professional Lacrosse League (WPLL), was named the Senior Director of Lacrosse. AU Pro Lacrosse featured a "short-form, fast-paced" format. It was played 10-a-side rather than 12-a-side. The field length was shorted to 90 yards, as opposed to the traditional 110 yards. The field width remained at 60 yards. There was a 60-second shot clock, and players could score two-point goals by scoring goals from outside of an 8-meter perimeter. The games were also 10-minute quarters. The game had been described as more physical, with less fouls called compared to other levels of the game. There were also no shooting space calls (shooting space being a penalty where a defender cannot stand between the goal and a player looking to shoot unless actively guarding another player).

The inaugural 2021 season took place from July 19 to August 22 in Boyds, Maryland at Maureen Hendricks Field. The 2022 season took place from July 21 to August 14 at William G. Tierney Field in Baltimore, Maryland, and returned there for the 2023 season from July 20 to August 13. Goalie Taylor Moreno became the first player to win two Athletes Unlimited championships. After the conclusion of the 2024 season, AU suspended its lacrosse operations, citing the "availability of the sport's most elite athletes during the summer months over the next few years" as its primary reason for doing so.

Athletes Unlimited Pro Lacrosse editions
| Year | Date | Venue | Location | (gold) Champion | | Ref. |
| Year | Date | Venue | Location | Player | Points | Ref. |
|---|---|---|---|---|---|---|
| 2021 | Jul 23 – Aug 22 | Hendricks Field | Boyds, MD | Taylor Cummings | 1,943 | |
| 2022 | Jul 21 – Aug 14 | Tierney Field | Sparks, MD | Taylor Moreno | 1,798 | |
| 2023 | Jul 20 – Aug 13 | Tierney Field | Sparks, MD | Taylor Moreno | 1,679 | |
| 2024 | Jul 18 – Aug 11 | Tierney Field | Sparks, MD | Sam Apuzzo | 1,852 | |
