= Beach volleyball at the 2016 Summer Olympics – Women's qualification =

The qualification for the 2016 Women's Olympic beach volleyball tournament was held from 26 June 2015 to 26 June 2016. A maximum of two teams per country were allowed to qualify. 24 teams from 17 countries qualified.

== Qualification summary ==
Means of qualification	Date	Venue	Vacancies	Qualified
Host Country	—	—	1	Brazil
2015 World Championships	26 June – 5 July 2015	Netherlands	1	Brazil
FIVB Beach Volleyball Olympic Ranking	13 June 2016	(Switzerland) Lausanne	15	United States
FIVB Beach Volleyball Olympic Ranking	13 June 2016	(Switzerland) Lausanne	15	Germany
FIVB Beach Volleyball Olympic Ranking	13 June 2016	(Switzerland) Lausanne	15	Canada
FIVB Beach Volleyball Olympic Ranking	13 June 2016	(Switzerland) Lausanne	15	Netherlands
FIVB Beach Volleyball Olympic Ranking	13 June 2016	(Switzerland) Lausanne	15	Australia
FIVB Beach Volleyball Olympic Ranking	13 June 2016	(Switzerland) Lausanne	15	Italy
FIVB Beach Volleyball Olympic Ranking	13 June 2016	(Switzerland) Lausanne	15	Germany
FIVB Beach Volleyball Olympic Ranking	13 June 2016	(Switzerland) Lausanne	15	Spain
FIVB Beach Volleyball Olympic Ranking	13 June 2016	(Switzerland) Lausanne	15	Poland
FIVB Beach Volleyball Olympic Ranking	13 June 2016	(Switzerland) Lausanne	15	Switzerland
FIVB Beach Volleyball Olympic Ranking	13 June 2016	(Switzerland) Lausanne	15	Canada
FIVB Beach Volleyball Olympic Ranking	13 June 2016	(Switzerland) Lausanne	15	Switzerland
FIVB Beach Volleyball Olympic Ranking	13 June 2016	(Switzerland) Lausanne	15	United States
FIVB Beach Volleyball Olympic Ranking	13 June 2016	(Switzerland) Lausanne	15	Argentina
FIVB Beach Volleyball Olympic Ranking	13 June 2016	(Switzerland) Lausanne	15	China
2014–2016 AVC Continental Cup	20–26 June 2016	(Australia) Cairns	1	Australia
2014–2016 CAVB Continental Cup	12–18 April 2016	(Nigeria) Abuja	1	Egypt
2014–2016 CEV Continental Cup	22–26 June 2016	(Norway) Stavanger	1	Netherlands
2014–2016 CSV Continental Cup	22–26 June 2016	(Argentina) Santa Fe	1	Venezuela
2014–2016 NORCECA Continental Cup	20–26 June 2016	(Mexico) Guaymas	1	Costa Rica
2016 FIVB World Continental Cup	6–10 July 2016	(Russia) Sochi	2	Czech Republic
2016 FIVB World Continental Cup	6–10 July 2016	(Russia) Sochi	2	Russia
Total			24	

== Host country ==
FIVB reserved a vacancy for the Olympics host country to participate in the tournament.

- Brazil, represented by Larissa França & Talita Antunes

== 2015 World Championships ==
The winners from 2015 Beach Volleyball World Championships qualified for the Olympics.

The World Champions were:

- (Brazil) Ágatha Bednarczuk & Bárbara Seixas

== Ranking ==
15 teams qualified from the Olympic Ranking.

Top 25 Rankings as of June 12, 2016.
Rank	Pair	Points	Qualified	Comment
1	(Brazil) Larissa França & Talita Antunes	7,700		Already qualified as host country representatives
2	(Brazil) Ágatha Bednarczuk & Bárbara Seixas	7,230		Already qualified as World Champions
3	(United States) Kerri Walsh Jennings & April Ross	6,670	1	
4	(Germany) Laura Ludwig & Kira Walkenhorst	6,500	2	
5	(Canada) Sarah Pavan & Heather Bansley	6,150	3	
6	(Netherlands) Madelein Meppelink & Marleen van Iersel	5,920	4	
7	(Australia) Louise Bawden & Taliqua Clancy	5,470	5	
8	(Italy) Marta Menegatti & Viktoria Orsi Toth	5,300	6	Orsi Toth was later replaced by Laura Giombini
9	(Germany) Karla Borger & Britta Büthe	5,260	7	
10	(Spain) Liliana Fernández & Elsa Baquerizo	4,830	8	
11	(Poland) Kinga Kołosińska & Monika Brzostek	4,800	9	
12	(Germany) Katrin Holtwick & Ilka Semmler	4,770		Not qualified due to country quota
13	(Brazil) Juliana Silva & Maria Antonelli	4,710		Not qualified due to country quota
14	(Switzerland) Isabelle Forrer & Anouk Vergé-Dépré	4,640	10	
15	(Canada) Jamie Broder & Kristina Valjas	4,640	11	
16	(Switzerland) Joana Heidrich & Nadine Zumkehr	4,620	12	
17	(United States) Lauren Fendrick & Brooke Sweat	4,470	13	
18	(Germany) Chantal Laboureur & Julia Sude	4,350		Not qualified due to country quota
19	(Argentina) Ana Gallay & Georgina Klug	4,220	14	
20	(China) Wang Fan & Yue Yuan	4,220	15	
21	(United States) Jennifer Kessy & Emily Day	3,980		
22	(Vanuatu) Linline Matauatu & Miller Pata	3,960		
23	(Russia) Evgenia Ukolova & Ekaterina Birlova	3,950		Qualified through the World Continental Cup
24	(Finland) Riikka Lehtonen & Taru Lahti	3,740		
25	(Brazil) Elize Maia & Eduarda Lisboa	3,630		

== Continental Cup ==
One winner from each Continental Cup qualified for the Olympics. Two teams qualified from the World Continental Cup.

=== Africa ===
Final standing:

- 1. Egypt
- 2. Rwanda
- 3. Nigeria
- 4. Mauritius
- 5. Morocco
- 6. Sierra Leone
- 7. Namibia
- 8. The Gambia
- 9. Mozambique
- 10. Ghana
- Egypt selected Doaa Elghobashy & Nada Meawad to compete in the Olympics.
- Rwanda and Nigeria qualified to the World Continental Cup, but neither played there.

=== Asia and Oceania ===
Final standing:

- 1. Australia
- 2. Vanuatu
- 3. China
- 4. Japan
- 5. Indonesia
- 5. Kazakhstan
- 5. Thailand
- 5. Chinese Taipei
- Australia selected Mariafe Artacho & Nicole Laird to compete in the Olympics.
- Vanuatu and China qualified to the World Continental Cup.

=== Europe ===
Final standing:

- 1. Netherlands
- 2. Ukraine
- 3. Czech Republic
- 4. Austria
- 5. Spain
- 5. France
- 5. Italy
- 5. Sweden
- Netherlands selected Jantine van der Vlist & Sophie van Gestel to compete in the Olympics.
- Ukraine, Czech Republic and Austria qualified to the World Continental Cup.

=== North America ===
Final standing:

- 1. Costa Rica
- 2. Mexico
- 3. Cuba
- 4. Guatemala
- 5. Nicaragua
- 6. Trinidad and Tobago
- 7. Jamaica
- 8. Barbados
- Costa Rica selected Nathalia Alfaro & Karen Cope to compete in the Olympics.
- Mexico and Cuba qualified to the World Continental Cup, but Cuba did not play there.

=== South America ===
Final standing:

- 1. Venezuela
- 2. Paraguay
- 3. Colombia
- 4. Uruguay
- 5. Argentina
- 6. Chile
- Venezuela selected Norisbeth Agudo & Olaya Pérez Pazo to compete in the Olympics.
- Paraguay and Colombia qualified to the World Continental Cup.

=== World Continental Cup ===
Winners:

- Czech Republic, who selected Barbora Hermannová & Markéta Sluková
- Russia, who selected Ekaterina Birlova & Evgenia Ukolova

== See also ==
- Beach volleyball at the 2016 Summer Olympics – Men's qualification
- Volleyball at the 2016 Summer Olympics – Women's qualification
- Volleyball at the 2016 Summer Olympics – Men's qualification
