= Spike For Peace International Beach Volleyball Tournament =

Spike For Peace Invitational Tournament
- Competition logo

Tournament details
- Host country: Philippines
- Dates: November 29 – December 3, 2015
- Teams: 13 (from 11 countries)
- Venue: 1 (in 1 host city)

Final positions
- Champions: Akiko Hasegawa and Ayumi Kusano (JPN) (1st title)

The Spike For Peace International Beach Volleyball Tournament was an international women's beach volleyball tournament hosted in Pasig, Metro Manila, Philippines from November 29 to December 3, 2015.

The tournament staged by the Philippine Sports Commission thru its beach volleyball consultant Eric Lecain and backed by the FIVB, AVC, POC and the local volleyball federation, the Larong Volleyball sa Pilipinas, Inc. (LVPI) was staged indoors at the PhilSports Arena. 300 m^{3} (11,000 ft^{3}) of sand from the Southwoods Golf Course was used for a beach volleyball court which was installed on top of the wooden floor of arena. This was to meet the international standard that calls for a court with sand at least 0.30 m (0.98 ft) thick.

The opening ceremonies held last November 30 was well attended by PSC Chairman Richie Garcia, POC board members Cynthia Carrion and Julian Camacho, LVPI Vice President Peter Cayco and LVPI board members Jeff Tamayo, Ricky Palou and Tatz Suzara.

== Participants ==
14 regular teams (some of them are also playing in the 2016 Rio Olympic qualifiers) participated in the tournament. Canada, China, Poland and Switzerland were also invited but didn't confirm its participation. For the Philippine delegation, Lecain also considered to add the services of Alyssa Valdez and Jovelyn Gonzaga in one of the national teams but was not able to confirmed participation from the two.

Country		Players	Country		Players
Australia	A	Justine Mowen; Jordan Mowen	Philippines	A	Representing Shakey's V-League: Alexa Micek; Charo Soriano
Australia	B	Becchara Palmer; Sarah Battaglene	Philippines	B	Representing Philippine Super Liga: Danika Gendrauli; Norie Jane Diaz
Brazil		Semirames Perazzo Ameral; Bruna Figueiredo	Spain		Ester Ribera; Amaranta Fernandez
Indonesia		Juliana Dhita; Dini Jasita Utami Putu	Sweden		Karin Lundqvist; Anne-Lie Rinisland
Japan		Akiko Hasegawa; Ayumi Kusano	Thailand		Tanarattha Udomchavee; Varapatsorn Radarong
Netherlands		Roos Van Dev Hoeven; Gabrielle Ilke	United States		Emily Stockman; Amanda Dowdy
New Zealand		Julie Tiley; Shauna Polley			

Both Philippine teams were coached by Oliver Almadro.

== Officials ==
Country	Names
Canada	Christopher Torr
American Samoa	Samuel Andrew Montalvo
Vietnam	Nguyen Thai Binh
Philippines	Ginio Panganiban

Aside from this, the LVPI helped in the technical aspects of the tournament, including the officiating and the equipment. The organizers paid the sanction fee from the FIVB for the exhibition tournament.

== Preliminary round ==
The 14 teams were divided into 4 pools (3 teams, 3 teams, 4 teams and 4 teams).

=== Pool A ===
Pos	Team	Pld	W	L	Pts	SW	SL	SR	SPW	SPL	SPR	Qualification
1	(Netherlands) Meertens–Van Der Hoeven	2	1	1	3	4	1	4.000	92	88	1.045	Quarterfinals
2	(Spain) Ribera–Fernandez	2	1	1	3	3	3	1.000	101	101	1.000	Contenders Bracket
3	(Australia) Palmer–Battaglene	2	1	1	3	2	3	0.667	89	93	0.957	Contenders Bracket

Date	Time		Score		Set 1	Set 2	Set 3	Total	Report
Nov 29	14:27	Palmer–Battaglene (Australia)	0–2	(Netherlands) Meertens–Van Der Hoeven	20-22	17-21		37–43	Report
Nov 29	19:00	Ribera–Fernandez (Spain)	1–2	(Australia) Palmer–Battaglene	17-21	21-16	12-21	50–52	Report
Nov 30	17:00	Ribera–Fernandez (Spain)	2–1	(Netherlands) Meertens–Van Der Hoeven	15-21	21-17	15-11	51-49	Report

=== Pool B ===
Pos	Team	Pld	W	L	Pts	SW	SL	SR	SPW	SPL	SPR	Qualification
1	(Indonesia) Dhita–Putu	2	2	0	4	4	1	4.000	95	78	1.218	Quarterfinals
2	(United States) Stockman–Dowdy	2	1	1	3	3	3	1.000	107	99	1.081	Contenders Bracket
3	(Australia) Ju. Mowen–Jo. Mowen	2	0	2	2	1	4	0.250	74	99	0.747	Contenders Bracket

Date	Time		Score		Set 1	Set 2	Set 3	Total	Report
Nov 29	15:20	Stockman–Dowdy (United States)	2–1	(Australia) Ju. Mowen–Jo. Mowen	21–23	21–13	15–10	57–46	Report
Nov 30	13:00	Ju. Mowen–Jo. Mowen (Australia)	0–2	(Indonesia) Dhita–Putu	16–21	12–21		28–42	Report
Dec 1	14:00	Dhita–Putu (Indonesia)	2–1	(United States) Stockman–Dowdy	21–16	17–21	15–13	53–50	Report

=== Pool C ===
Pos	Team	Pld	W	L	Pts	SW	SL	SR	SPW	SPL	SPR	Qualification
1	(Japan) Hasegawa–Kusano	3	3	0	6	6	1	6.000	84	54	1.556	Quarterfinals
2	(Sweden) Lundqvist–Rininsland	3	2	1	5	5	2	2.500	146	130	1.123	Contenders Bracket
3	(Brazil) Ameral–Figueiredo	3	1	2	4	3	4	0.750	115	118	0.975	Contenders Bracket
4	(Philippines) Gendrauli–Diaz	3	0	3	3	0	6	0.000	82	126	0.651	

Date	Time		Score		Set 1	Set 2	Set 3	Total	Report
Nov 29	16:23	Gendrauli–Diaz (Philippines)	0–2	(Sweden) Lundqvist–Rininsland	13–21	16–21		29–42	Report
Nov 29	17:10	Hasegawa–Kusano (Japan)	2–0	(Brazil) Ameral–Figueiredo	21–12	21–15		42–27	Report
Nov 30	14:00	Lundqvist–Rininsland (Sweden)	2–1	(Brazil) Ameral–Figueiredo	21–12	14–21	15–13	50–46	Report
Nov 30	15:00	Hasegawa–Kusano (Japan)	2–0	(Philippines) Gendrauli–Diaz	21–16	21–11		42–27	Report
Nov 30	18:00	Rininsland (Sweden)	1–2	(Japan) Hasegawa–Kusano	21-17	18-21	15-17	54-55	Report
Nov 30	19:00	Ameral–Figueiredo (Brazil)	2–0	(Philippines) Gendrauli–Diaz	21-15	21-11		42-26	Report

=== Pool D ===
Pos	Team	Pld	W	L	Pts	SW	SL	SR	SPW	SPL	SPR	Qualification
1	(Thailand) Udomchavee–Radarong	2	2	0	4	4	0	MAX	84	49	1.714	Quarterfinals
2	(New Zealand) Tiley–Polley	2	1	1	3	2	2	1.000	71	69	1.029	Contenders Bracket
3	(Philippines) Micek–Soriano	2	0	2	2	0	4	0.000	47	84	0.560	Contenders Bracket

Date	Time		Score		Set 1	Set 2	Set 3	Total	Report
Nov 29	18:00	Udomchavee–Radarong (Thailand)	2–0	(Philippines) Micek–Soriano	21–11	21–9		42–20	Report
Nov 30	16:00	Tiley–Polley (New Zealand)	2–0	(Philippines) Micek–Soriano	21–17	21–10		42–27	Report
Dec 1	13:00	Tiley–Polley (New Zealand)	0–2	(Thailand) Udomchavee–Radarong	15–21	14–21		29–42	Report

Schedule: Philippine Sports Commission

== Second round ==
=== Contenders bracket ===
Date	Time		Score		Set 1	Set 2	Set 3	Total	Report
Dec 1	16:00	Ribera–Fernandez (Spain)	2–0	(Philippines) Micek–Soriano	21-14	21-10		42-24	Report
Dec 1	17:00	Palmer–Battaglene (Australia)	1–2	(New Zealand) Tiley–Polley	19-21	21-15	9-15	49-51	Report
Dec 1	18:00	Stockman–Dowdy (United States)	0–2	(Brazil) Ameral–Figueiredo	21-15	21-13		42-28	Report
Dec 1	19:00	Ju. Mowen–Jo. Mowen (Australia)	0–2	(Sweden) Lundqvist–Rininsland	10-21	10-21		20-42	Report

== Final round ==
Fifth place
D1	(Thailand) Udomchavee / Radarong	2
A2	(Spain) Ribera / Fernandez	1
Seventh place
D2	(New Zealand) Tiley / Polley	2
A1	(Netherlands) Meertens / Van Der Hoeven	0

Consolation semifinals
A2	(Spain) Ribera / Fernandez	2
D2	(New Zealand) Tiley / Polley	0
A1	(Netherlands) Meertens / Van Der Hoeven	0
D1	(Thailand) Udomchavee / Radarong	2

Quarterfinals
B1	(Indonesia) Dhita / Putu	2
A2	(Spain) Ribera / Fernandez	0
C1	(Japan) Hasegawa / Kusano	2
D2	(New Zealand) Tiley / Polley	0
A1	(Netherlands) Meertens / Van Der Hoeven	1
C3	(Brazil) Ameral / Figueiredo	2
D1	(Thailand) Udomchavee / Radarong	0
C2	(Sweden) Lundqvist / Rininsland	2

Semifinals
B1	(Indonesia) Dhita / Putu	1
C1	(Japan) Hasegawa / Kusano	2
C3	(Brazil) Ameral / Figueiredo	1
C2	(Sweden) Lundqvist / Rininsland	2

Final
C1	(Japan) Hasegawa / Kusano	2
C2	(Sweden) Lundqvist / Rininsland	0
Third place
B1	(Indonesia) Dhita / Putu	2
C3	(Brazil) Ameral / Figueiredo	1

=== Quarterfinals ===
The pairings of the quarter-finals were determined through the drawing of lots. Each tie consist of one team which topped the pool in the preliminary round and a winner from the contenders bracket.

Date	Time		Score		Set 1	Set 2	Set 3	Total	Report
Dec 2	14:00	Meertens–Van Der Hoeven (Netherlands)	1–2	(Brazil) Ameral–Figueiredo	14-21	21-19	12-15	47-55	Report
Dec 2	15:00	Dhita–Putu (Indonesia)	2-0	(Spain) Ribera–Fernandez	22-20	23-21		45-41	Report
Dec 2	16:00	Hasegawa–Kusano (Japan)	2–0	(New Zealand) Tiley–Polley	21-9	21-11		42-20	Report
Dec 2	17:00	Udomchavee–Radarong (Thailand)	0–2	(Sweden) Lundqvist–Rininsland	22-24	20-22		42-46	Report

=== 5th–8th place semifinals ===
Date	Time		Score		Set 1	Set 2	Set 3	Total	Report
Dec 2	18:00	Ribera–Fernandez (Spain)	2–0	(New Zealand) Tiley–Polley	21–12	23–21		44–33	Report
Dec 2	19:00	Meertens–Van Der Hoeven (Netherlands)	0–2	(Thailand) Udomchavee–Radarong	17–21	18–21		35–42	Report

=== Semifinals ===
Date	Time		Score		Set 1	Set 2	Set 3	Total	Report
Dec 3	13:00	Lundqvist–Rininsland (Sweden)	2–1	(Brazil) Ameral–Figueiredo	19-21	21-19	15-8	55-48	Report
Dec 3	14:00	Dhita–Putu (Indonesia)	1–2	(Japan) Hasegawa–Kusano	14-21	21-18	12-15	47-54	Report

=== Seventh place match ===
Date	Time		Score		Set 1	Set 2	Set 3	Total	Report
Dec 3	15:00	Tiley–Polley (New Zealand)	2–0	(Netherlands) Meertens–Van Der Hoeven	21-19	21-17		42-36	Report

=== Fifth place match ===
Date	Time		Score		Set 1	Set 2	Set 3	Total	Report
Dec 3	16:00	Ribera–Fernandez (Spain)	1–2	(Thailand) Udomchavee–Radarong	21-19	18-21	17-19	56-59	Report

=== Third place match ===
Date	Time		Score		Set 1	Set 2	Set 3	Total	Report
Dec 3	17:00	Ameral–Figueiredo (Brazil)	1–2	(Indonesia) Dhita–Putu	16-21	21-19	8-15	45-55	Report

=== Final ===
Date	Time		Score		Set 1	Set 2	Set 3	Total	Report
Dec 3	18:00	Lundqvist–Rininsland (Sweden)	0–2	(Japan) Hasegawa–Kusano	19-21	12-21		31-42	Report

== Final standing ==
Rank	Team	Record
1st place, gold medalist(s)	Hasegawa–Kusano (JPN)	6–0
2nd place, silver medalist(s)	Lundqvist–Rininsland (SWE)	5–2
3rd place, bronze medalist(s)	Dhita–Putu (INA)	4–1
4	Ameral–Figueiredo (BRA)	3–4
5	Udomchavee–Radarong (THA)	4–1
6	Ribera–Fernandez (ESP)	3–3
7	Tiley–Polley (NZL)	3–3
8	Meertens–Van Der Hoeven (NED)	1–4
Eliminated at the Contenders bracket
10	Palmer–Battaglene (AUR)	1–2
10	Stockman–Dowdy (USA)	1–2
12	Ju. Mowen–Jo. Mowen (AUS)	0–3
12	Micek–Soriano (PHI)	0–3
Eliminated at the Preliminary round
13	Gendrauli–Diaz (PHI)	0–3

2015 Spike For Peace winners
(Japan)
Japan
Akiko Hasegawa and Ayumi Kusano
1st title
