= 2014–2016 CEV Beach Volleyball Continental Cup =

The 2015 2014–2016 CEV Beach Volleyball Continental Cup were a beach volleyball double-gender event. Teams were split into groups of four, where an elimination bracket determined the 3 teams to advance to the next stage from the sub-zones. The winners of the event qualified for the 2016 Summer Olympics.

== Men ==
=== Round 1 ===
==== Pool A ====
Pool A was contested in Matosinhos, Portugal.

Semifinals
28 June 2014
France	2
Iceland	0
28 June 2014
Portugal	2
Hungary	0

Final
28 June 2014
France	2
Portugal	0
Play-off
29 June 2014
Iceland	0
Hungary	2

Second place match Portugal 2–0 Hungary

===== Semifinals =====
28 June 2014; 10:40	(France) Salvetti – (France) Daguerre	2–0	(Iceland) Valdimarsson – (Iceland) Valdimarsson	Praia da Marginal
28 June 2014; 10:40	(21–5, 21–10)			Praia da Marginal

28 June 2014; 10:40	(France) Krou – (France) Rowlandson	2–0	(Iceland) Matthíasson – (Iceland) Þorvaldsson	Praia da Marginal
28 June 2014; 10:40	(21–4, 21–10)			Praia da Marginal

28 June 2014; 10:40	(Portugal) Reis – (Portugal) Silva	2–0	(Hungary) Buday – (Hungary) Racz	Praia da Marginal
28 June 2014; 10:40	(21–14, 21–9)			Praia da Marginal

28 June 2014; 10:40	(Portugal) Moreira – (Portugal) Simões	2–0	(Hungary) Bagics – (Hungary) Koch	Praia da Marginal
28 June 2014; 10:40	(21–17, 21–13)			Praia da Marginal

===== 4th place =====
29 June 2014; 11:40	(Hungary) Bagics – (Hungary) Koch	2–1	(Iceland) Valdimarsson – (Iceland) Valdimarsson	Praia da Marginal
29 June 2014; 11:40	(21–8, 19–21, 15–8)			Praia da Marginal

29 June 2014; 11:40	(Hungary) Buday – (Hungary) Racz	2–1	(Iceland) Matthíasson – (Iceland) Þorvaldsson	Praia da Marginal
29 June 2014; 11:40	(21–12, 14–21, 15–11)			Praia da Marginal

===== 2nd place =====
29 June 2014; 16:55	(Portugal) Reis – (Portugal) Silva	2–0	(Hungary) Buday – (Hungary) Racz	Praia da Marginal
29 June 2014; 16:55	(21–8, 21–14)			Praia da Marginal

29 June 2014; 11:40	(Portugal) Moreira – (Portugal) Simões	2–0	(Hungary) Bagics – (Hungary) Koch	Praia da Marginal
29 June 2014; 11:40	(21–19, 21–18)			Praia da Marginal

===== Final =====
28 June 2014; 16:00	(France) Salvetti – (France) Daguerre	2–0	(Portugal) Moreira – (Portugal) Simões	Praia da Marginal
28 June 2014; 16:00	(21–13, 21–15)			Praia da Marginal

29 June 2014; 16:00	(France) Krou – (France) Rowlandson	2–0	(Portugal) Reis – (Portugal) Silva	Praia da Marginal
29 June 2014; 16:00	(21–17, 21–19)			Praia da Marginal

- France and Portugal qualified to round 3.

==== Pool B ====
Pool B was contested in Portorož, Slovenia.
Round1 Scotland 2–0 Northern Ireland

Semi-finals
15 June 2014
Norway	2
Slovenia	0
15 June 2014
Belgium	2
Scotland	0

Final
15 June 2014
Norway	1
Belgium	2

- Belgium and Norway qualified to round 3.

==== Pool C ====
Pool C was contested in Umag, Croatia.

Semifinals
29 June 2014
Denmark	2
Croatia	0
29 June 2014
Czech Republic	2
Luxembourg	0

Final
30 June 2014
Denmark	1
Czech Republic	2
Play-off
29 June 2014
Luxembourg	0
Croatia	2

Second place match Denmark 2–0 Croatia

- Czech Republic and Denmark qualified to round 3.

==== Pool D ====
Pool D was contested in Bournemouth, England.

Semifinals
21 June 2014
Switzerland	2
Ireland	0
21 June 2014
England	2
Slovakia	0

Final
22 June 2014
Switzerland	1
England	2
Play-off
21 June 2014
Ireland	2
Slovakia	1

Second place match Switzerland 2–0 Ireland

- England and Switzerland qualified to round 3.

==== Pool E ====
Pool E was contested in Marathon, Greece.

Semifinals
21 June 2014
Belarus	2
San Marino	0
21 June 2014
Greece	2
Romania	0

Final
22 June 2014
Belarus	1
Greece	2
Play-off
21 June 2014
San Marino	2
Romania	0

Second place match Belarus 2–0 San Marino

- Greece and Belarus qualified to round 3.

==== Pool F ====
Pool F was contested in Vilnius, Lithuania.
Round1 Moldova 1–2 Bosnia and Herzegovina

Semi-finals
29 June 2014
Estonia	2
Lithuania	0
29 June 2014
Cyprus	2
Bosnia and Herzegovina	1

Final
29 June 2014
Estonia	2
Cyprus	1

- Estonia and Cyprus qualified to round 3.

==== Pool G ====
Pool G was contested in Kardzhali, Bulgaria.

Semifinals
21 June 2014
Serbia	2
Albania	0
21 June 2014
Finland	2
Bulgaria	0

Final
22 June 2014
Serbia	1
Finland	2
Play-off
21 June 2014
Albania	0
Bulgaria	2

Second place match Serbia 2–0 Bulgaria

- Finland and Serbia qualified to round 3.

==== Pool H ====
Pool H was contested in Baku, Azerbaijan.

Semifinals
21 June 2014
Ukraine	2
Azerbaijan	0
21 June 2014
Turkey	2
Israel	0

Final
22 June 2014
Ukraine	2
Turkey	0
Play-off
19 June 2014
Azerbaijan	1
Israel	2

Second place match Turkey 1–2 Israel

- Ukraine and Israel qualified to round 3.

=== Round 2 ===
==== Pool A ====
Pool A was contested in Odense, Denmark.
Round 1 Luxembourg 2–0 Iceland

Semi-finals
21 September 2014
Slovenia	2
Luxembourg	0
21 September 2014
Hungary	0
Croatia	2

Final
22 September 2014
Slovenia	2
Croatia	1

- Slovenia and Croatia qualified to round 3.

==== Pool B ====
Pool B was contested in Edinburgh, Scotland.

Semifinals
21 September 2014
Scotland	2
Slovakia	1
21 September 2014
Northern Ireland	1
Ireland	2

Final
22 September 2014
Scotland	2
Ireland	1
Play-off
19 September 2014
Slovakia	2
Northern Ireland	0

Second place match Ireland 1–2 Slovakia

- Scotland and Slovakia qualified to round 3.

==== Pool C ====
Pool C was contested in Mellieha, Malta.
Round 1 Bosnia and Herzegovina 2–0 Moldova

Semi-finals
21 September 2014
Israel	2
Bosnia and Herzegovina	0
21 September 2014
Romania	2
San Marino	1

Final
22 September 2014
Israel	2
Romania	0

- Israel and Romania qualified to round 3.

==== Pool D ====
Pool D was contested in Belgrade, Serbia.

Semifinals
31 August 2014
Lithuania	0
Azerbaijan	2
31 August 2014
Bulgaria	2
Albania	0

Final
1 September 2014
Azerbaijan	2
Bulgaria	0
Play-off
31 August 2014
Lithuania	2
Albania	0

Second place match Bulgaria 0–2 Lithuania

- Azerbaijan and Lithuania qualified to round 3.

=== Round 3 ===
==== Pool A ====
Pool A was contested in Baden, Austria.

Semifinals
2 May 2015
Austria	2
Portugal	0
2 May 2015
Czech Republic	2
Azerbaijan	1

Final
3 May 2015
Austria	0
Czech Republic	2
Play-off
3 May 2015
Portugal	1
Azerbaijan	2

Second place match Austria 2–1 Azerbaijan

- Czech Republic qualified to semifinals.
- Austria qualified to round 4.

==== Pool B ====
Pool B was contested in Baden, Austria.

Semifinals
30 April 2015
Russia	2
Scotland	0
30 April 2015
Norway	2
Ukraine	0

Final
1 May 2015
Russia	1
Norway	2
Play-off
1 May 2015
Scotland	0
Ukraine	2

Second place match Russia 2–0 Ukraine

- Norway qualified to semifinals.
- Russia qualified to round 4.

==== Pool C ====
Pool C was contested in Lorca, Spain.

Semifinals
9 May 2015
Spain	2
Slovenia	0
9 May 2015
Switzerland	2
Belgium	0

Final
10 May 2015
Spain	2
Switzerland	0
Play-off
10 May 2015
Belgium	2
Slovenia	0

Second place match Switzerland 2–0 Belgium

- Spain qualified to the semifinals.
- Switzerland qualified to round 4.

==== Pool D ====
Pool D was contested in Montpellier, France.

Semifinals
9 May 2015
Italy	2
Slovakia	0
9 May 2015
France	2
Denmark	0

Final
9 May 2015
Italy	2
France	1
Play-off
10 May 2015
Denmark	1
Slovakia	2

Second place match France 2–0 Slovakia

- Italy qualified to the semifinals.
- France qualified to round 4.

==== Pool E ====
Pool E was contested in Thessaloniki, Greece.

Semifinals
2 May 2015
Germany	2
Romania	0
2 May 2015
Belarus	1
Greece	2

Final
3 May 2015
Germany	2
Greece	1
Play-off
2 May 2015
Belarus	2
Romania	0

Second place match Belarus 1–2 Greece

- Germany qualified to the semifinals.
- Greece qualified to round 4.

==== Pool F ====
Pool F was contested in Vilnius, Lithuania.

Semifinals
2 May 2015
Poland	2
Lithuania	0
2 May 2015
Serbia	0
Estonia	2

Final
3 May 2015
Poland	2
Estonia	0
Play-off
2 May 2015
Serbia	1
Lithuania	2

Second place match Estonia 2–1 Lithuania

- Poland qualified to the semifinals.
- Estonia qualified to round 4.

==== Pool G ====
Pool G was contested in Paralimni, Cyprus.

Semifinals
9 May 2015
Netherlands	2
Cyprus	0
9 May 2015
Israel	2
Finland	1

Final
10 May 2015
Netherlands	2
Israel	0
Play-off
9 May 2015
Cyprus	0
Finland	2

Second place match Israel 2–0 Finland

- Netherlands qualified to the semifinals.
- Israel qualified to round 4.

==== Pool H ====
Pool H was contested in Fethiye, Turkey.

Semifinals
2 May 2015
Latvia	2
Croatia	0
2 May 2015
Turkey	2
England	1

Final
2 May 2015
Latvia	1
Turkey	2
Play-off
2 May 2015
Croatia	0
England	2

Second place match Latvia 2–0 England

- Turkey qualified to the semifinals.
- Latvia qualified to round 4.

=== Round 4 ===
==== Pool A ====
Pool A was contested in Vilnius, Lithuania.

Semifinals
4 Sep 2015
France	2
Lithuania	0
4 Sep 2015
Austria	2
Finland	1

Final
5 Sep May 2015
France	2
Austria	0
Play-off
4 Sep 2015
Lithuania	1
Finland	2

Second place match Austria 2–1 Finland

- France and Austria qualified to the final phase.

==== Pool B ====
Pool B was contested in Sochi, Russia.

Semifinals
4 Sep 2015
Russia	2
Slovakia	0
4 Sep 2015
Latvia	2
Belarus	0

Final
5 Sep 2015
Russia	1
Latvia	2
Play-off
4 Sep 2015
Slovakia	2
Belarus	1

Second place match Russia 2–1 Slovakia

- Latvia and Russia qualified to the final phase.

==== Pool C ====
Pool C was contested in Thessaloniki, Greece.

Semifinals
5 Sep 2015
Greece	2
England	0
5 Sep 2015
Switzerland	2
Ukraine	1

Final
5 Sep 2015
Switzerland	1
Greece	2
Play-off
6 Sep 2015
England	0
Ukraine	2

Second place match Switzerland 2–1 Ukraine

- Greece and Switzerland qualified to the final phase.

==== Pool D ====
Pool D was contested in Tel Aviv, Israel.

Semifinals
11 Sep 2015
Israel	2
Portugal	1
11 Sep 2015
Belgium	2
Estonia	0

Final
11/12 Sep 2015
Belgium	2
Israel	1
Play-off
12 Sep 2015
Estonia	2
Portugal	0

Second place match Israel 1–2 Estonia

- Belgium and Estonia qualified to the final phase.

=== Final round ===
The final round was played in Stavanger, Norway 22 to 26 June 2016.

Round of 16
23 June
Norway	2
Finland	0
23 June
Belgium	2
Greece	1
23 June
Czech Republic	1
Switzerland	2
23 June
Estonia	0
Spain	2
23 June
Turkey	2
Israel	1
23 June
Austria	2
Latvia	1
23 June
France	0
Russia	2
23 June
Ukraine	2
Germany	1

Quarter-finals
24 June
Norway	1
Belgium	2
24 June
Switzerland	1
Spain	2
24 June
Turkey	0
Austria	2
24 June
Russia	2
Ukraine	0

Semi-finals
25 June
Belgium	2
Spain	1
25 June
Austria	2
Russia	1

Final
26 June
Belgium	1
Austria	2
Bronze Final
26 June
Spain	0
Russia	2

== Women ==
=== Ranking ===
The top 8 in CEV Country Ranking as of 31 December 2013 qualified to round 3.

- Netherlands, Poland, Italy, Germany, Latvia, Spain, Austria and Russia

=== Round 1 ===
==== Pool A ====
Pool A was contested in Matosinhos, Portugal.

Semifinals
28 June 2014
Portugal	2
Iceland	0
28 June 2014
France	2
Hungary	0

Final
28 June 2014
Portugal	0
France	2
Play-off
29 June 2014
Iceland	0
Hungary	2

Second place match Portugal 2–0 Hungary

- France and Portugal qualified to round 3.
- Hungary and Iceland continued in round 2.

==== Pool B ====
Pool B was contested in Portorož, Slovenia.

- Round1: Northern Ireland 0–2 Scotland
- Round2: Norway 2–0 Scotland
- Round2: Belgium 2–0 Slovenia

Semi-finals
15 June 2014
Norway	2
Slovenia	0
15 June 2014
Belgium	2
Scotland	0

Final
15 June 2014
Norway	2
Belgium	1

- 5 place: Northern Ireland 0–2 Slovenia

===== Round 1 =====
14 June 2014; 8:30	(Scotland) Mullin – (Scotland) Hastings	2–0	(Northern Ireland) Kirkpatrick – (Northern Ireland) Traynor	Portorož Beach
14 June 2014; 8:30	(21–5, 21–7)			Portorož Beach

14 June 2014; 9:20	(Scotland) Beattie – (Scotland) Lyall	2–0	(Northern Ireland) Harkness – (Northern Ireland) McCarroll	Portorož Beach
14 June 2014; 9:20	(21–9, 21–12)			Portorož Beach

===== Round 2 =====
14 June 2014; 10:15	(Belgium) Gielen – (Belgium) Sobolska	2–0	(Slovenia) Pešić – (Slovenia) Skarlovnik	Portorož Beach
14 June 2014; 10:15	(21–17, 21–18)			Portorož Beach

14 June 2014; 10:15	(Belgium) Callens – (Belgium) Catry	2–0	(Slovenia) Sakovic – (Slovenia) Turkl	Portorož Beach
14 June 2014; 10:15	(21–13, 21–13)			Portorož Beach

14 June 2014; 13:30	(Norway) Kongshavn – (Norway) Kjølberg	2–0	(Scotland) Beattie – (Scotland) Lyall	Portorož Beach
14 June 2014; 13:30	(21–13, 21–12)			Portorož Beach

14 June 2014; 10:15	(Norway) Treland – (Norway) Pedersen	2–1	(Scotland) Mullin – (Scotland) Hastings	Portorož Beach
14 June 2014; 10:15	(17–21, 21–13, 15–13)			Portorož Beach

===== 5 place ranked =====
14 June 2014; 15:30	(Northern Ireland) Harkness – (Northern Ireland) McCarroll	0–2	(Slovenia) Pešić – (Slovenia) Skarlovnik	Portorož Beach
14 June 2014; 15:30	(6–21, 4–21)			Portorož Beach

14 June 2014; 10:15	(Northern Ireland) Kirkpatrick – (Northern Ireland) Traynor	0–2	(Slovenia) Sakovic – (Slovenia) Turkl	Portorož Beach
14 June 2014; 10:15	(10–21, 8–21)			Portorož Beach

===== Semifinals =====
15 June 2014; 9:00	(Norway) Kongshavn – (Norway) Kjølberg	2–0	(Slovenia) Pešić – (Slovenia) Skarlovnik	Portorož Beach
15 June 2014; 9:00	(21–11, 21–11)			Portorož Beach

15 June 2014; 10:40	(Norway) Treland – (Norway) Pedersen	2–0	(Slovenia) Sakovic – (Slovenia) Turkl	Portorož Beach
15 June 2014; 10:40	(21–14, 21–17)			Portorož Beach

15 June 2014; 9:00	(Belgium) Gielen – (Belgium) Sobolska	2–0	(Scotland) Beattie – (Scotland) Lyall	Portorož Beach
15 June 2014; 9:00	(21–13, 21–14)			Portorož Beach

15 June 2014; 9:50	(Belgium) Callens – (Belgium) Catry	2–0	(Scotland) Mullin – (Scotland) Hastings	Portorož Beach
15 June 2014; 9:50	(21–16, 18–21, 15–4)			Portorož Beach

===== Final =====
15 June 2014; 14:00	(Norway) Kongshavn – (Norway) Kjølberg	2–0	(Belgium) Callens – (Belgium) Catry	Portorož Beach
15 June 2014; 14:00	(24–22, 21–17)			Portorož Beach

15 June 2014; 15:00	(Norway) Treland – (Norway) Pedersen	2–0	(Belgium) Gielen – (Belgium) Sobolska	Portorož Beach
15 June 2014; 15:00	(21–19, 21–19)			Portorož Beach

- Norway and Belgium qualified to round 3.
- Scotland, Slovenia and Northern Ireland continued in round 2.

==== Pool C ====
Pool C was contested in Umag, Croatia.

Semifinals
29 June 2014
Poland	2
Luxembourg	0
29 June 2014
Denmark	2
Croatia	0

Final
30 June 2014
Poland	2
Denmark	0
Play-off
29 June 2014
Luxembourg	0
Croatia	2

Second place match Denmark 0–2 Croatia

- Poland and Croatia qualified to round 3.
- Denmark and Luxembourg continued in round 2.

==== Pool D ====
Pool D was contested in Bournemouth, England.

Semifinals
21 June 2014
Sweden	2
Ireland	0
21 June 2014
England	2
Slovakia	1

Final
22 June 2014
Sweden	2
England	1
Play-off
21 June 2014
Ireland	1
Slovakia	2

===== Semifinals =====
21 June 2014; 9:00	(Sweden) Grawender – (Sweden) Lundqvist	2–0	(Republic of Ireland) Allen – (Republic of Ireland) Dignam	The Leaf Academy
21 June 2014; 9:00	(21–5, 21–4)			The Leaf Academy

21 June 2014; 9:50	(Sweden) Nilsson – (Sweden) Yoken	2–0	(Republic of Ireland) Gormally – (Republic of Ireland) Counihan	The Leaf Academy
21 June 2014; 9:50	(21–3, 21–0)			The Leaf Academy

21 June 2014; 10:40	(England) Dampney – (England) Leaf	2–1	(Slovakia) Krskova – (Slovakia) Herelova	The Leaf Academy
21 June 2014; 10:40	(17–21, 24–22, 15–13)			The Leaf Academy

21 June 2014; 11:30	(England) Lazard – (England) Grimson	0–2	(Slovakia) Turnerova – (Slovakia) Tomašeková	The Leaf Academy
21 June 2014; 11:30	(20–22, 13–21)			The Leaf Academy

21 June 2014; 13:15	(England) Dampney – (England) Leaf	2–0	(Slovakia) Turnerova – (Slovakia) Tomašeková	The Leaf Academy
21 June 2014; 13:15	(21–19, 21–12)			The Leaf Academy

Second place match England England 0–2 Slovakia

- Sweden and Slovakia qualified to round 3.
- England and Ireland continued in round 2.

==== Pool E ====
Pool E was contested in Marathon, Greece.

Semifinals
21 June 2014
Greece	2
Malta	0
21 June 2014
Belarus	2
Romania	0

Final
22 June 2014
Greece	2
Belarus	0
Play-off
21 June 2014
Malta	0
Romania	2

===== Semifinals =====
21 June 2014; 9:00	(Greece) Arvaniti – (Greece) Tsiartsiani	2–0	(Malta) Demicoli – (Malta) Bonnici	Karavi Schinias
21 June 2014; 9:00	(21–7, 21–9)			Karavi Schinias

21 June 2014; 9:00	(Greece) Karagkouni – (Greece) Christou	2–0	(Malta) Borg – (Malta) Zarb	Karavi Schinias
21 June 2014; 9:00	(21–16, 21–15)			Karavi Schinias

21 June 2014; 10:40	(Belarus) Bernatovich – (Belarus) Babenka	2–0	(Romania) Barsasteanu – (Romania) Galit	Karavi Schinias
21 June 2014; 10:40	(21–15, 21–10)			Karavi Schinias

21 June 2014; 10:40	(Belarus) Siakretava – (Belarus) Shalayeuskaya	2–0	(Romania) Ordean – (Romania) Melniciuc	Karavi Schinias
21 June 2014; 10:40	(21–13, 21–7)			Karavi Schinias

===== Final =====
21 June 2014; 14:00	(Greece) Arvaniti – (Greece) Tsiartsiani	2–0	(Belarus) Siakretava – (Belarus) Shalayeuskaya	Karavi Schinias
21 June 2014; 14:00	(21–13, 21–15)			Karavi Schinias

21 June 2014; 14:50	(Greece) Karagkouni – (Greece) Christou	2–0	(Belarus) Bernatovich – (Belarus) Babenka	Karavi Schinias
21 June 2014; 14:50	(21–9, 21–17)			Karavi Schinias

Second place match Belarus 2–0 Romania

- Greece and Belarus qualified to round 3.
- Romania and Malta continued in round 2.

==== Pool F ====
Pool F was contested in Vilnius, Lithuania.
Round1 Bosnia and Herzegovina 0–2 Estonia

Semi-finals
29 June 2014
Lithuania	2
Estonia	0
29 June 2014
Latvia	0
Cyprus	2

Final
29 June 2014
Lithuania	2
Cyprus	0

- Lithuania and Cyprus qualified to round 3.
- Estonia, Latvia and Bosnia and Herzegovina continued in round 2.

==== Pool G ====
Pool G was contested in Kardzhali, Bulgaria.

Semifinals
21 June 2014
Finland	2
Albania	0
21 June 2014
Bulgaria	2
Serbia	0

Final
22 June 2014
Finland	2
Bulgaria	0
Play-off
21 June 2014
Albania	0
Serbia	2

Second place match Bulgaria 2–0 Serbia

- Finland and Bulgaria qualified to round 3.
- Serbia and Albania continued in round 2.

==== Pool H ====
Pool H was contested in Baku, Azerbaijan.

Semifinals
21 June 2014
Ukraine	2
Azerbaijan	0
21 June 2014
Turkey	0
Israel	2

Final
22 June 2014
Ukraine	2
Israel	0
Play-off
19 June 2014
Azerbaijan	0
Turkey	2

Second place match Israel 2–1 Turkey

- Ukraine and Israel qualified to round 3.
- Turkey and Azerbaijan continued in round 2.

=== Round 2 ===
==== Pool A ====
Pool A was contested in Odense, Denmark.
Round 1 Luxembourg 0–2 Iceland

Semi-finals
21 September 2014
Slovenia	2
Hungary	0
21 September 2014
Denmark	2
Iceland	0

Final
22 September 2014
Denmark	1
Slovenia	2

- Slovenia and Denmark qualified to round 3.
- Hungary, Iceland and Luxembourg eliminated.

==== Pool B ====
Pool B was contested in Edinburgh, Scotland.

Semifinals
21 September 2014
Scotland	2
Northern Ireland	0
21 September 2014
England	2
Ireland	0

Final
22 September 2014
Scotland	1
England	2
Play-off
19 September 2014
Northern Ireland	2
Ireland	1

Second place match Scotland 2–1 Northern Ireland

- England and Scotland qualified to round 3.
- Northern Ireland and Ireland eliminated.

==== Pool C ====
Pool C was contested in Mellieha, Malta.
Round 1 Turkey 2–0 Malta

Semi-finals
21 September 2014
Romania	0
Turkey	2
21 September 2014
Latvia	2
Bosnia and Herzegovina	0

Final
22 September 2014
Turkey	2
Latvia	0

- Turkey and Latvia qualified to round 3.
- Bosnia and Herzegovina, Romania and Malta eliminated.

==== Pool D ====
Pool D was contested in Belgrade, Serbia.

Semifinals
31 August 2014
Serbia	2
Albania	0
31 August 2014
Estonia	0
Azerbaijan	2

Final
1 September 2014
Serbia	0
Azerbaijan	2
Play-off
31 August 2014
Albania	0
Estonia	2

Second place match Serbia 2–0 Estonia

- Azerbaijan and Serbia qualified to round 3.
- Estonia and Albania eliminated.

=== Round 3 ===
==== Pool A ====
Pool A was contested in Baden, Austria.

Semifinals
1 May 2015
Austria	2
Portugal	0
1 May 2015
Sweden	2
Azerbaijan	1

Final
2 May 2015
Austria	2
Sweden	0
Play-off
2 May 2015
Portugal	0
Azerbaijan	2

Second place match Sweden 2–1 Azerbaijan

- Austria qualified to the final round.
- Sweden and Azerbaijan qualified to round 4.
- Portugal eliminated.

==== Pool B ====
Pool B was contested in Baden, Austria.

Semifinals
30 April 2015
Russia	2
Scotland	0
30 April 2015
Ukraine	2
Bulgaria	0

Final
30 April 2015
Russia	2
Ukraine	0
Play-off
30 April 2015
Scotland	2
Bulgaria	1

Second place match Ukraine 2–0 Scotland

- Russia qualified to the final round.
- Ukraine and Scotland qualified to round 4.
- Bulgaria eliminated.

==== Pool C ====
Pool C was contested in Lorca, Spain.

Semifinals
9 May 2015
Spain	2
Croatia	0
9 May 2015
Norway	2
Slovenia	0

Final
10 May 2015
Spain	2
Norway	0
Play-off
9 May 2015
Slovenia	2
Croatia	0

Second place match Norway 2–0 Slovenia

- Spain qualified to the final round.
- Norway and Slovenia qualified to round 4.
- Croatia eliminated.

==== Pool D ====
Pool D was contested in Montpellier, France.

Semifinals
9 May 2015
Italy	2
Israel	0
9 May 2015
Denmark	0
France	2

Final
9 May 2015
Italy	2
France	0
Play-off
10 May 2015
Denmark	0
Israel	2

Second place match France 2–0 Israel

- Italy qualified to the final round.
- France and Israel qualified to round 4.
- Denmark eliminated.

==== Pool E ====
Pool E was contested in Thessaloniki, Greece.

Semifinals
2 May 2015
Germany	2
England	0
2 May 2015
Greece	2
Belarus	0

Final
3 May 2015
Germany	2
Greece	0
Play-off
2 May 2015
Belarus	1
England	2

Second place match Greece 2–0 England

- Germany qualified to the final round.
- Greece and England qualified to round 4.
- Belarus eliminated.

==== Pool F ====
Pool F was contested in Vilnius, Lithuania.

Semifinals
2 May 2015
Czech Republic	2
Serbia	0
2 May 2015
Slovakia	2
Lithuania	1

Final
3 May 2015
Czech Republic	2
Slovakia	1
Play-off
2 May 2015
Lithuania	2
Serbia	1

Second place match Slovakia 1–2 Lithuania

- Czech Republic qualified to the final round.
- Lithuania and Slovakia qualified to round 4.
- Serbia eliminated.

==== Pool G ====
Pool G was contested in Cyprus, Paralimni.

Semifinals
9 May 2015
Finland	2
Cyprus	0
9 May 2015
Netherlands	2
Latvia	0

Final
10 May 2015
Finland	1
Netherlands	2
Play-off
10 May 2015
Cyprus	1
Latvia	2

Second place match Finland 2–0 Latvia

- Netherlands qualified to the final round.
- Finland and Latvia qualified to round 4.
- Cyprus eliminated.

==== Pool H ====
Pool H was contested in Fethiye, Turkey.

Semifinals
2 May 2015
Switzerland	2
Belgium	0
2 May 2015
Poland	2
Turkey	0

Final
3 May 2015
Switzerland	2
Poland	1
Play-off
2 May 2015
Belgium	1
Turkey	2

Second place match Poland 2–1 Belgium

- Switzerland qualified to the final round.
- Poland and Belgium qualified to round 4.
- Turkey eliminated.

=== Round 4 ===
==== Pool A ====
Pool A was contested in Vilnius, Lithuania.

Semifinals
5 Sep 2015
Ukraine	1
Belgium	2
5 Sep 2015
Lithuania	2
Slovenia	0

Final
5 Sep 2015
Lithuania	1
Belgium	2
Play-off
6 Sep 2015
Slovenia	0
Ukraine	2

Second place match Lithuania 2–1 Ukraine

- Belgium and Lithuania qualified to the final round.
- Ukraine and Slovenia eliminated.

==== Pool B ====
Pool B was contested in Sochi, Russia.

Semifinals
4 Sep 2015
France	2
England	1
4 Sep 2015
Latvia	1
Sweden	2

Final
5 Sep 2015
France	1
Sweden	2
Play-off
4 Sep 2015
England	0
Latvia	2

Second place match France 2–0 Latvia

- Sweden and France qualified to the final round.
- Latvia and England eliminated.

==== Pool C ====
Pool B was contested in Greece.

- Finland and Greece qualified to the final round.
- Scotland eliminated.
- Azerbaijan did not participate.

==== Pool D ====
Pool B was contested in Israel.

- Poland and Slovakia qualified to the final round.
- Israel and Norway eliminated.

=== Final round ===
The final round was played in Stavanger, Norway 22 to 26 June 2016.

As Germany and Switzerland already had qualified to the Olympics with the maximum number of two teams per country through the FIVB Beach Volleyball Olympic Ranking, they were replaced by Norway and Ukraine.

Round of 16
22 June
Norway	0
Ukraine	2
22 June
Sweden	2
Finland	1
22 June
Austria	2
Greece	0
22 June
France	2
Russia	1
22 June
Czech Republic	2
Slovakia	1
22 June
Belgium	0
Spain	2
22 June
Italy	2
Poland	1
22 June
Lithuania	0
Netherlands	2

Quarter-finals
23 June
Ukraine	2
Sweden	1
23 June
Austria	2
France	0
23 June
Czech Republic	2
Spain	1
23 June
Italy	0
Netherlands	2

Semi-finals
24 June
Ukraine	2
Austria	1
24 June
Czech Republic	0
Netherlands	2

Final
25 June
Ukraine	1
Netherlands	2
Bronze Final
25 June
Austria	0
Czech Republic	2

- Netherlands qualified to the 2016 Summer Olympics
- Ukraine, Czech Republic and Austria qualified to the World Continental Cup
