= Chile at the 2016 Summer Olympics =

- IOC code: CHI
- NOC: Chilean Olympic Committee
- Website: www.coch.cl (in Spanish)

in Rio de Janeiro
- Competitors: 42 in 16 sports
- Flag bearers: Érika Olivera (opening); Bárbara Riveros (closing)
- Medals: Gold 0 Silver 0 Bronze 0 Total 0

Summer Olympics appearances (overview)
- ~~1896~~; 1900–1908; 1912; 1920; 1924; 1928; 1932; 1936; 1948; 1952; 1956; 1960; 1964; 1968; 1972; 1976; 1980; 1984; 1988; 1992; 1996; 2000; 2004; 2008; 2012; 2016; 2020; 2024; 2028

Chile competed at the 2016 Summer Olympics in Rio de Janeiro, Brazil, from 5 to 21 August 2016.

The Chilean Olympic Committee (Spanish: Comité Olímpico de Chile, COCH)) fielded a team of 42 athletes, 25 men and 17 women, to compete in sixteen sports at the Games. It was the nation's largest delegation sent to the Olympics without any association to the team-based sports for the first time. Nearly 25 percent of the Chilean team competed in the track and field, the largest by sport; there was only a single competitor in archery, equestrian, golf, judo, shooting, taekwondo, and triathlon.

The Chilean roster featured five sets of family members, including beach volleyball cousins Esteban and Marco Grimalt, race walking twins Edward and Yerko Araya, London 2012 yachtsman Benjamín Grez and his older brother Cristobal, and two other pairs of rookies sailing each other in the men's and women's 470 class, respectively: sisters Arantza and Begoña Gumucio and brothers Andrés and Francisco Ducasse. Fifteen Chilean athletes previously competed in London, with Laser sailor Matías del Solar and distance freestyle swimmer Kristel Köbrich headed to their fourth Olympics. Meanwhile, marathon runner Érika Olivera, who served as the nation's flag bearer at the opening ceremony, reached a historic milestone as the first Chilean female to compete in five Olympic Games. Other notable Chilean athletes included world-ranked triathlete Bárbara Riveros, artistic gymnast and London 2012 fourth-place finalist Tomás González, shot putter Natalia Duco, and 16-year-old archer Ricardo Soto.

For the second Olympics in a row, Chile failed to earn a single medal at the Games. Riveros, González, and weightlifter María Fernanda Valdés were the only athletes to achieve the most successful outcome for Chile in Rio de Janeiro, finishing among the top eight in their respective sporting events (fifth for Riveros and seventh each for González and Valdés).

== Archery ==
One Chilean archer qualified for the men's individual recurve by securing one of three available Olympic spots at the Pan American Qualification Tournament in Medellín, Colombia.

Athlete	Event	Ranking round		Round of 64	Round of 32	Round of 16	Quarterfinals	Semifinals	Final / BM	
Athlete	Event	Score	Seed	Opposition Score	Opposition Score	Opposition Score	Opposition Score	Opposition Score	Opposition Score	Rank
Ricardo Soto	Men's individual	675	13	Prylepau (BLR); W 5 (29)–5 (27)	Oliveira (BRA); W 7–1	van den Berg (NED); L 5–6	Did not advance			

== Athletics (track and field) ==
Chilean athletes achieved qualifying standards in the following athletics events (up to a maximum of 3 athletes in each event):

Key

- Note–Ranks given for track events are within the athlete's heat only
- Q = Qualified for the next round
- q = Qualified for the next round as a fastest loser or, in field events, by position without achieving the qualifying target
- NR = National record
- N/A = Round not applicable for the event
- Bye = Athlete not required to compete in round

Track & road events
Men

Athlete	Event	Final	
Athlete	Event	Result	Rank
Víctor Aravena	Marathon	2:17:49	42
Edward Araya	50 km walk	DSQ	
Yerko Araya	20 km walk	1:22:23	25
Daniel Estrada	Marathon	2:25:33	98
Enzo Yáñez	Marathon	2:27:47	108

Women

Athlete	Event	Heat		Semifinal		Final	
Athlete	Event	Result	Rank	Result	Rank	Result	Rank
Isidora Jiménez	200 m	23.29	5	Did not advance			
Érika Olivera	Marathon	—N/a				2:50:29	105
Natalia Romero	Marathon	—N/a				3:01:29	123

Field events

Athlete	Event	Qualification		Final	
Athlete	Event	Distance	Position	Distance	Position
Natalia Duco	Women's shot put	18.18	9 q	18.07	10
Karen Gallardo	Women's discus throw	57.81	18	Did not advance	

== Cycling ==
=== Road ===
Chile has qualified one rider in the men's Olympic road race by virtue of his top 20 individual ranking in the 2015 UCI America Tour. One additional spot was awarded to the Chilean cyclist in the women's road race by virtue of her top 100 individual placement in the 2016 UCI World Rankings.

Athlete	Event	Time	Rank
José Luis Rodríguez	Men's road race	Did not finish	
Paola Muñoz	Women's road race	Did not finish	

== Equestrian ==
Chile has entered one eventing rider into the Olympic equestrian competition by virtue of a top finish from Central & South America in the individual FEI Olympic rankings.

=== Eventing ===
Athlete	Horse	Event	Dressage		Cross-country			Jumping						Total	
Athlete	Horse	Event	Dressage		Cross-country			Qualifier			Final			Total	
Athlete	Horse	Event	Penalties	Rank	Penalties	Total	Rank	Penalties	Total	Rank	Penalties	Total	Rank	Penalties	Rank
Carlos Lobos	Ranco	Individual	49.30	40	42.80	92.10	30	4.00	96.10	29	Did not advance			96.10	29

== Golf ==
Chile has entered one golfer into the Olympic tournament. Felipe Aguilar (world no. 248) qualified directly among the top 60 players for the men's singles based on the IGF World Rankings as of 11 July 2016.

Athlete	Event	Round 1	Round 2	Round 3	Round 4	Total		
Athlete	Event	Score	Score	Score	Score	Score	Par	Rank
Felipe Aguilar	Men's	71	71	75	68	285	+1	=39

== Gymnastics ==
=== Artistic ===
Chile has entered two artistic gymnasts into the Olympic competition. London 2012 fourth-place finalist Tomás González and fellow Olympian Simona Castro had claimed their Olympic spots each in the men's and women's apparatus and all-around events, respectively, at the Olympic Test Event in Rio de Janeiro.

Men

Athlete	Event	Qualification								Final							
Athlete	Event	Apparatus						Total	Rank	Apparatus						Total	Rank
Athlete	Event	F	PH	R	V	PB	HB	Total	Rank	F	PH	R	V	PB	HB	Total	Rank
Tomás González	Floor	15.066	—N/a					15.066	14	Did not advance							
Tomás González	Vault	—N/a			15.149	—N/a		15.149	8 Q	—N/a			15.137	—N/a		15.137	7

Women

Athlete	Event	Qualification						Final					
Athlete	Event	Apparatus				Total	Rank	Apparatus				Total	Rank
Athlete	Event	V	UB	BB	F	Total	Rank	V	UB	BB	F	Total	Rank
Simona Castro	All-around	13.733	12.833	13.000	11.833	51.399	52	Did not advance					

== Judo ==
Chile has qualified one judoka for the men's middleweight category (90 kg) at the Games. Thomas Briceño earned a continental quota spot from the Pan American region as highest-ranked Chilean judoka outside of direct qualifying position in the IJF World Ranking List of 30 May 2016.

Athlete	Event	Round of 64	Round of 32	Round of 16	Quarterfinals	Semifinals	Repechage	Final / BM	
Athlete	Event	Opposition Result	Opposition Result	Opposition Result	Opposition Result	Opposition Result	Opposition Result	Opposition Result	Rank
Thomas Briceño	Men's −90 kg	Khalaf (JOR); W 011–000	Gwak D-h (KOR); L 000–100	Did not advance					

== Rowing ==
Chile has qualified one boat each in the men's and women's lightweight double sculls, respectively, at the 2016 Latin American Continental Qualification Regatta in Valparaíso.

Athlete	Event	Heats		Repechage		Semifinals		Final	
Athlete	Event	Time	Rank	Time	Rank	Time	Rank	Time	Rank
Felipe Cárdenas; Bernardo Guerrero	Men's lightweight double sculls	6:38.95	3 R	7:11.38	4 SC/D	7:24.71	3 FC	6:47.67	17
Melita Abraham; Josefa Vila	Women's lightweight double sculls	7:20.63	4 R	8:11.97	4 SC/D	8:20.26	3 FC	7:46.99	17

Qualification Legend: FA=Final A (medal); FB=Final B (non-medal); FC=Final C (non-medal); FD=Final D (non-medal); FE=Final E (non-medal); FF=Final F (non-medal); SA/B=Semifinals A/B; SC/D=Semifinals C/D; SE/F=Semifinals E/F; QF=Quarterfinals; R=Repechage

== Sailing ==
Chilean sailors have qualified one boat in each of the following classes through the individual fleet World Championships, and South American qualifying regattas.

Men

Athlete	Event	Race													Net points	Final rank
Athlete	Event	1	2	3	4	5	6	7	8	9	10	11	12	M*	Net points	Final rank
Matías del Solar	Laser	22	~~35~~	22	32	35	24	34	33	24	12	—N/a		EL	238	30
Andrés Ducasse; Francisco Ducasse	470	24	22	24	20	18	4	23	~~25~~	23	14	—N/a		EL	172	24
Benjamín Grez; Cristóbal Grez	49er	12	18	15	19	18	~~21~~	7	20	21	14	12	15	EL	171	20

Women

Athlete	Event	Race													Net points	Final rank
Athlete	Event	1	2	3	4	5	6	7	8	9	10	11	12	M*	Net points	Final rank
Nadja Horwitz; Sofía Middleton	470	9	11	~~18~~	16	10	2	10	11	16	15	—N/a		EL	100	11
Arantza Gumucio; Begoña Gumucio	49erFX	16	14	18	14	15	~~19~~	12	14	17	17	15	16	EL	168	18

M = Medal race; EL = Eliminated – did not advance into the medal race

== Shooting ==
Chile has qualified one shooter in the women's skeet by virtue of her best finish at the seventh stop of the 2015 ISSF World Cup series in Gabala, Azerbaijan.

Athlete	Event	Qualification		Semifinal		Final	
Athlete	Event	Points	Rank	Points	Rank	Points	Rank
Francisca Crovetto	Women's skeet	62	19	Did not advance			

Qualification Legend: Q = Qualify for the next round; q = Qualify for the bronze medal (shotgun)

== Swimming ==
Chilean swimmers have so far achieved qualifying standards in the following events (up to a maximum of 2 swimmers in each event at the Olympic Qualifying Time (OQT), and potentially 1 at the Olympic Selection Time (OST)):

Athlete	Event	Heat		Final	
Athlete	Event	Time	Rank	Time	Rank
Felipe Tapia	Men's 1500 m freestyle	16:02.44	45	Did not advance	
Kristel Köbrich	Women's 400 m freestyle	4:16.07	24	Did not advance	
Kristel Köbrich	Women's 800 m freestyle	8:34.34	17	Did not advance	

== Taekwondo ==
Chile entered one athlete into the taekwondo competition at the Olympics. Ignacio Morales secured a spot in the men's lightweight category (68 kg) by virtue of his top two finish at the 2016 Pan American Qualification Tournament in Aguascalientes, Mexico.

Athlete	Event	Round of 16	Quarterfinals	Semifinals	Repechage	Final / BM	
Athlete	Event	Opposition Result	Opposition Result	Opposition Result	Opposition Result	Opposition Result	Rank
Ignacio Morales	Men's −68 kg	Tazegül (TUR); L 1–14 PTG	Did not advance				

== Tennis ==
Chile has entered two tennis players into the Olympic tournament. Julio Peralta and Hans Podlipnik had claimed one of eight ITF Olympic men's doubles places, as Chile's top-ranked tennis pair outside of direct qualifying position in the ATP World Rankings as of 6 June 2016.

Athlete	Event	Round of 32	Round of 16	Quarterfinals	Semifinals	Final / BM	
Athlete	Event	Opposition Result	Opposition Result	Opposition Result	Opposition Result	Opposition Result	Rank
Julio Peralta; Hans Podlipnik	Men's doubles	Johnson / Sock (USA); L 2–6, 2–6	Did not advance				

== Triathlon ==
Chile has secured a quota in the women's triathlon event as a result of Barbara Riveros' triumph at the 2015 Pan American Games.

Athlete	Event	Swim (1.5 km)	Trans 1	Bike (40 km)	Trans 2	Run (10 km)	Total Time	Rank
Bárbara Riveros	Women's	19:13	0:52	1:01:24	0:39	35:21	1:57:29	5

== Volleyball ==
=== Beach ===
Chile men's beach volleyball team qualified directly for the Olympics by winning the final match over Venezuela at the 2016 CSV Continental Cup in Rosario, Argentina, signifying the nation's Olympic debut to the sport.

Athlete	Event	Preliminary round	Standing	Round of 16	Quarterfinals	Semifinals	Final / BM	
Athlete	Event	Opposition Score	Standing	Opposition Score	Opposition Score	Opposition Score	Opposition Score	Rank
Esteban Grimalt; Marco Grimalt	Men's	Pool E Nummerdor – Varenhorst (NED); L 0 – 2 (16–21, 13–21); Krasilnikov – Semenov (RUS); L 0 – 2 (17–21, 14–21); Fijałek – Prudel (POL); L 1 – 2 (13–21, 21–16, 9–15)	4	Did not advance				

== Weightlifting ==
Chile has qualified one female weightlifter for the Rio Olympics by virtue of a top four national finish at the 2016 Pan American Championships. Meanwhile, an unused men's Olympic spot was added to the Chilean weightlifting team by IWF, as a response to the vacancy of women's quota places in the individual World Rankings and to the "multiple positive cases" of doping on several nations. The team must allocate these places to individual athletes by 20 June 2016.

Athlete	Event	Snatch		Clean & Jerk		Total	Rank
Athlete	Event	Result	Rank	Result	Rank	Total	Rank
Julio Acosta	Men's −62 kg	120	10	146	11	266	11
María Fernanda Valdés	Women's −75 kg	107	=6	135	=6	242	7

== See also ==
- Chile at the 2015 Pan American Games
- Chile at the 2016 Winter Youth Olympics
