= 2014–2016 CSV Beach Volleyball Continental Cup =

The 2015 2014–2016 CSV Beach Volleyball Continental Cup were a beach volleyball double-gender event. The winners of the event will qualify for the 2016 Summer Olympics

== Men ==
=== First round ===
==== Group A ====
Date	Team	Score	Team
31 Oct 2014	Guyana	0–4	French Guiana
1 Nov 2014	Brazil	4–0	French Guiana
2 Nov 2014	Brazil	4–0	Guyana

==== Group B ====
Date	Team	Score	Team
6–7 Dec 2014	Colombia	0–4	Venezuela
6–7 Dec 2014	Ecuador	0–4	Colombia
6–7 Dec 2014	Venezuela	4–0	Ecuador

==== Group C ====
Date	Team	Score	Team
4 Dec 2014	Bolivia	0–4	Chile
5 Dec 2014	Chile	4–0	Peru
6 Dec 2014	Peru	0–4	Bolivia

==== Group D ====
Date	Team	Score	Team
21 Nov 2014	Paraguay	0–4	Argentina
22 Nov 2014	Uruguay	4–0	Paraguay
23 Nov 2014	Argentina	3–1	Uruguay

- Brazil, Venezuela, Chile, and Argentina qualified for final round.

=== Second round ===
==== Group E ====
Ranked	Team
1	Peru
2	Ecuador
3	Paraguay
4	Guyana

Qualified for Group F

==== Group F ====
Ranked	Team
1	Colombia
2	Uruguay
3	French Guiana
4	Bolivia
5	Peru

Qualified for final round

== Women ==
=== First round ===
==== Group A ====
- Venue: Escola de Educação Física do Exército, Rio de Janeiro, Brazil

Pos	Team	Pld	W	L	Pts	SW	SL	SR	SPW	SPL	SPR
1	Brazil	4	4	0	12	8	0	MAX	168	38	4.421
2	Guyana	0	0	0	0	0	0	—	0	0	—
3	French Guiana	4	0	4	0	0	8	0.000	38	168	0.226

Date	Time		Score		Set 1	Set 2	Set 3	Set 4	Set 5	Total	Report
31 October	10:10	(Brazil) Hoffmann–Belota	2–0	Larcher–Tuybens	21–18	21–8				42–26	
31 October	10:10	(Brazil) Glatt–Freitas	w/o	Springer–Marie-Claire							
31 October	10:10	(Brazil) Hoffmann–Belota	w/o	Springer–Marie-Claire							
31 October	10:10	(Brazil) Glatt–Freitas	2–0	(French Guiana) Larcher–Tuybens	21–7	21–4				42–11	

==== Group B ====
Date	Team	Score	Team
6–7 Dec 2014	Colombia	1–3	Venezuela
6–7 Dec 2014	Ecuador	0–4	Colombia
6–7 Dec 2014	Venezuela	4–0	Ecuador

==== Group C ====
Date	Team	Score	Team
4 Dec 2014	Chile	4–0	Peru
5 Dec 2014	Peru	1–3	Bolivia
6 Dec 2014	Bolivia	2–2	Chile

==== Group D ====
Date	Team	Score	Team
21 Nov 2014	Uruguay	2–2	Paraguay
22 Nov 2014	Argentina	2–2	Uruguay
23 Nov 2014	Paraguay	1–3	Argentina

- Brazil, Venezuela, Chile, and Argentina qualified for final round.

=== Second round ===
==== Group E ====
Ranked	Team
1	Paraguay
2	Ecuador
3	Peru
4	French Guiana

Qualified for Group F

==== Group F ====
Ranked	Team
1	Colombia
2	Paraguay
3	Uruguay
4	Bolivia
5	Guyana

Qualified for final round

== Final round ==
=== Women ===
The final round was played 22–26 June 2016.

- Venue: Rosario, Argentina

Ranked	Team
1	Venezuela
2	Paraguay
3	Colombia
4	Uruguay
5	Argentina
6	Chile

- Venezuela qualified to the 2016 Olympics.
- Paraguay and Colombia qualified to the World Continental Cup.
