= Volleyball at the 2016 Summer Olympics =

Volleyball at the Games of the XXXI Olympiad
- Pictograms for indoor (left) and beach volleyball (right)
- Venue: Ginásio do Maracanãzinho (indoor); Copacabana Stadium (beach)
- Dates: 6–21 August 2016
- No. of events: 4

The volleyball tournaments at the 2016 Summer Olympics in Rio de Janeiro was played between 6 and 21 August. 24 volleyball teams and 48 beach volleyball teams, total 386 athletes, participated in the tournament. The indoor volleyball competition took place at Ginásio do Maracanãzinho in Maracanã, and the beach volleyball tournament was held at Copacabana Beach, in the temporary Copacabana Stadium.

== Competition schedule ==
P	Preliminary round	1/8	Round of 16	1/4	Quarter-finals	1/2	Semi-finals	B	Bronze medal match	F	Final

Date Event	Sat 6	Sun 7	Mon 8	Tue 9	Wed 10	Thu 11	Fri 12	Sat 13	Sun 14	Mon 15	Tue 16	Wed 17		Thu 18		Fri 19	Sat 20		Sun 21	
Men's indoor		P		P		P		P		P		1/4				1/2			B	F
Women's indoor	P		P		P		P		P		1/4			1/2			B	F		
Men's beach	P	P	P	P	P	P	1/8	1/8		1/4	1/2			B	F					
Women's beach	P	P	P	P	P	P	1/8	1/8	1/4		1/2	B	F							

== Events ==
Four sets of medals were awarded in the following events:

- Indoor volleyball – men (12 teams, 144 athletes)
- Indoor volleyball – women (12 teams, 144 athletes)
- Beach volleyball – men (24 teams, 48 athletes)
- Beach volleyball – women (24 teams, 48 athletes)

== Qualification ==
Each National Olympic Committee was allowed to enter one men's and one women's qualified team in the volleyball tournaments and two men's and two women's qualified teams in the beach volleyball.

=== Men's volleyball ===
Means of qualification	Date	Venue	Vacancies	Qualified
Host Country	—	—	1	Brazil
2015 World Cup	8–23 September 2015	Japan	2	United States
2015 World Cup	8–23 September 2015	Japan	2	Italy
South American Qualifier	9–11 October 2015	(Venezuela) Maiquetía	1	Argentina
European Qualifier	5–10 January 2016	(Germany) Berlin	1	Russia
African Qualifier	7–12 January 2016	(Republic of the Congo) Brazzaville	1	Egypt
North American Qualifier	8–10 January 2016	(Canada) Edmonton	1	Cuba
Asian Qualifier*	28 May – 5 June 2016	(Japan) Tokyo	1	Iran
1st World Qualifier	28 May – 5 June 2016	(Japan) Tokyo	3	Poland
1st World Qualifier	28 May – 5 June 2016	(Japan) Tokyo	3	France
1st World Qualifier	28 May – 5 June 2016	(Japan) Tokyo	3	Canada
2nd World Qualifier	3–5 June 2016	Mexico City	1	Mexico
Total			12	

* The Asian Qualifier was combined with the 1st World Qualifier. The best Asian team qualified as the Asian Qualifier winners, while the best three ranked teams except the Asian Qualifier winners qualified as the top three teams of the 1st World Qualifier.

=== Women's volleyball ===
Means of qualification	Date	Venue	Vacancies	Qualified
Host Country	—	—	1	Brazil
2015 World Cup	22 August – 6 September 2015	Japan	2	China
2015 World Cup	22 August – 6 September 2015	Japan	2	Serbia
European Qualifier	4–9 January 2016	(Turkey) Ankara	1	Russia
South American Qualifier	6–10 January 2016	(Argentina) Bariloche	1	Argentina
North American Qualifier	7–9 January 2016	(United States) Lincoln	1	United States
African Qualifier	12–16 February 2016	(Cameroon) Yaoundé	1	Cameroon
Asian Qualifier	14–22 May 2016	(Japan) Tokyo	1	South Korea
1st World Qualifier	14–22 May 2016	(Japan) Tokyo	3	Italy
1st World Qualifier	14–22 May 2016	(Japan) Tokyo	3	Netherlands
1st World Qualifier	14–22 May 2016	(Japan) Tokyo	3	Japan
2nd World Qualifier	20–22 May 2016	(Puerto Rico) San Juan	1	Puerto Rico
Total			12	

=== Men's beach volleyball ===
Means of qualification	Date	Venue	Vacancies	Qualified
Host Country	2 October 2009	(Denmark) Copenhagen	1	Brazil
2015 World Championships	26 June – 5 July 2015	Netherlands	1	Brazil
FIVB Beach Volleyball Olympic Ranking	13 June 2016	(Switzerland) Lausanne	15	Netherlands
FIVB Beach Volleyball Olympic Ranking	13 June 2016	(Switzerland) Lausanne	15	United States
FIVB Beach Volleyball Olympic Ranking	13 June 2016	(Switzerland) Lausanne	15	Netherlands
FIVB Beach Volleyball Olympic Ranking	13 June 2016	(Switzerland) Lausanne	15	United States
FIVB Beach Volleyball Olympic Ranking	13 June 2016	(Switzerland) Lausanne	15	Spain
FIVB Beach Volleyball Olympic Ranking	13 June 2016	(Switzerland) Lausanne	15	Latvia
FIVB Beach Volleyball Olympic Ranking	13 June 2016	(Switzerland) Lausanne	15	Russia
FIVB Beach Volleyball Olympic Ranking	13 June 2016	(Switzerland) Lausanne	15	Italy
FIVB Beach Volleyball Olympic Ranking	13 June 2016	(Switzerland) Lausanne	15	Poland
FIVB Beach Volleyball Olympic Ranking	13 June 2016	(Switzerland) Lausanne	15	Italy
FIVB Beach Volleyball Olympic Ranking	13 June 2016	(Switzerland) Lausanne	15	Austria
FIVB Beach Volleyball Olympic Ranking	13 June 2016	(Switzerland) Lausanne	15	Poland
FIVB Beach Volleyball Olympic Ranking	13 June 2016	(Switzerland) Lausanne	15	Germany
FIVB Beach Volleyball Olympic Ranking	13 June 2016	(Switzerland) Lausanne	15	Canada
FIVB Beach Volleyball Olympic Ranking	13 June 2016	(Switzerland) Lausanne	15	Mexico
2014–2016 AVC Continental Cup	20–26 June 2016	(Australia) Cairns	1	Qatar
2014–2016 CAVB Continental Cup	3–9 May 2016	(Tunisia) Kelibia	1	Tunisia
2014–2016 CEV Continental Cup	22–26 June 2016	(Norway) Stavanger	1	Austria
2014–2016 CSV Continental Cup	22–26 June 2016	(Chile) Santiago	1	Chile
2014–2016 NORCECA Continental Cup	20–26 June 2016	(Mexico) Guaymas	1	Cuba
2016 FIVB World Continental Cup	6–10 July 2016	(Russia) Sochi	2	Canada
2016 FIVB World Continental Cup	6–10 July 2016	(Russia) Sochi	2	Russia
Total			24	

=== Women's beach volleyball ===
Means of qualification	Date	Venue	Vacancies	Qualified
Host Country	—	—	1	Brazil
2015 World Championships	26 June – 5 July 2015	Netherlands	1	Brazil
FIVB Beach Volleyball Olympic Ranking	13 June 2016	(Switzerland) Lausanne	15	United States
FIVB Beach Volleyball Olympic Ranking	13 June 2016	(Switzerland) Lausanne	15	Germany
FIVB Beach Volleyball Olympic Ranking	13 June 2016	(Switzerland) Lausanne	15	Canada
FIVB Beach Volleyball Olympic Ranking	13 June 2016	(Switzerland) Lausanne	15	Netherlands
FIVB Beach Volleyball Olympic Ranking	13 June 2016	(Switzerland) Lausanne	15	Australia
FIVB Beach Volleyball Olympic Ranking	13 June 2016	(Switzerland) Lausanne	15	Italy
FIVB Beach Volleyball Olympic Ranking	13 June 2016	(Switzerland) Lausanne	15	Germany
FIVB Beach Volleyball Olympic Ranking	13 June 2016	(Switzerland) Lausanne	15	Spain
FIVB Beach Volleyball Olympic Ranking	13 June 2016	(Switzerland) Lausanne	15	Poland
FIVB Beach Volleyball Olympic Ranking	13 June 2016	(Switzerland) Lausanne	15	Switzerland
FIVB Beach Volleyball Olympic Ranking	13 June 2016	(Switzerland) Lausanne	15	Canada
FIVB Beach Volleyball Olympic Ranking	13 June 2016	(Switzerland) Lausanne	15	Switzerland
FIVB Beach Volleyball Olympic Ranking	13 June 2016	(Switzerland) Lausanne	15	United States
FIVB Beach Volleyball Olympic Ranking	13 June 2016	(Switzerland) Lausanne	15	Argentina
FIVB Beach Volleyball Olympic Ranking	13 June 2016	(Switzerland) Lausanne	15	China
2014–2016 AVC Continental Cup	20–26 June 2016	(Australia) Cairns	1	Australia
2014–2016 CAVB Continental Cup	12–18 April 2016	(Nigeria) Abuja	1	Egypt
2014–2016 CEV Continental Cup	22–26 June 2016	(Norway) Stavanger	1	Netherlands
2014–2016 CSV Continental Cup	22–26 June 2016	(Argentina) Santa Fe	1	Venezuela
2014–2016 NORCECA Continental Cup	20–26 June 2016	(Mexico) Guaymas	1	Costa Rica
2016 FIVB World Continental Cup	6–10 July 2016	(Russia) Sochi	2	Czech Republic
2016 FIVB World Continental Cup	6–10 July 2016	(Russia) Sochi	2	Russia
Total			24	

== Men's indoor competition ==
The competition consisted of two stages; a preliminary round followed by a knockout stage.

=== Preliminary round ===
The teams were divided into two groups of six countries, playing every team in their group once. Three points were awarded for a 3–0 or 3–1 win, two points for a 3–2 win, one point for a 2–3 loss and 0 points for a 1–3 or 0–3 loss. The top four teams per group qualified for the quarter-finals.

==== Pool A ====
Pos	Team	Pld	W	L	Pts	SW	SL	SR	SPW	SPL	SPR	Qualification
1	Italy	5	4	1	12	13	5	2.600	432	375	1.152	Quarterfinals
2	Canada	5	3	2	9	10	7	1.429	378	378	1.000	Quarterfinals
3	United States	5	3	2	9	10	8	1.250	419	405	1.035	Quarterfinals
4	Brazil (H)	5	3	2	9	11	9	1.222	467	442	1.057	Quarterfinals
5	France	5	2	3	6	8	9	0.889	386	367	1.052	
6	Mexico	5	0	5	0	1	15	0.067	283	398	0.711	

Source: FIVB
Rules for classification: Tiebreakers
(H) Host

==== Pool B ====
Pos	Team	Pld	W	L	Pts	SW	SL	SR	SPW	SPL	SPR	Qualification
1	Argentina	5	4	1	12	12	4	3.000	394	335	1.176	Quarterfinals
2	Poland	5	4	1	12	14	5	2.800	447	389	1.149	Quarterfinals
3	Russia	5	4	1	11	13	6	2.167	432	367	1.177	Quarterfinals
4	Iran	5	2	3	7	8	9	0.889	389	392	0.992	Quarterfinals
5	Egypt	5	1	4	3	3	12	0.250	286	362	0.790	
6	Cuba	5	0	5	0	1	15	0.067	300	403	0.744	

Source: FIVB
Rules for classification: Tiebreakers

=== Knockout stage ===
Quarterfinals
17 August
Italy	3
Iran	0
17 August
United States	3
Poland	0
17 August
Canada	0
Russia	3
17 August
Brazil	3
Argentina	1

Semifinals
19 August
Italy	3
United States	2
19 August
Russia	0
Brazil	3

Gold medal match
21 August
Italy	0
Brazil	3
Bronze medal match
21 August
United States	3
Russia	2

== Women's indoor competition ==
The competition consisted of two stages; a Preliminary round followed by a knockout stage.

=== Preliminary round ===
The teams were divided into two groups of six countries, playing every team in their group once. Three points were awarded for a 3–0 or 3–1 win, two points for a 3–2 win, one point for a 2–3 loss and 0 points for a 1–3 or 0–3 loss. The top four teams per group qualified for the quarter-finals.

==== Pool A ====
Pos	Team	Pld	W	L	Pts	SW	SL	SR	SPW	SPL	SPR	Qualification
1	Brazil (H)	5	5	0	15	15	0	MAX	377	272	1.386	Quarter-finals
2	Russia	5	4	1	12	12	4	3.000	393	323	1.217	Quarter-finals
3	South Korea	5	3	2	9	10	7	1.429	384	372	1.032	Quarter-finals
4	Japan	5	2	3	6	7	9	0.778	347	364	0.953	Quarter-finals
5	Argentina	5	1	4	2	3	14	0.214	319	407	0.784	
6	Cameroon	5	0	5	1	2	15	0.133	328	410	0.800	

Source: FIVB
Rules for classification: Tiebreakers
(H) Host

==== Pool B ====
Pos	Team	Pld	W	L	Pts	SW	SL	SR	SPW	SPL	SPR	Qualification
1	United States	5	5	0	14	15	5	3.000	470	400	1.175	Quarter-finals
2	Netherlands	5	4	1	11	14	7	2.000	455	425	1.071	Quarter-finals
3	Serbia	5	3	2	10	12	6	2.000	410	394	1.041	Quarter-finals
4	China	5	2	3	7	9	9	1.000	398	389	1.023	Quarter-finals
5	Italy	5	1	4	3	4	12	0.333	351	374	0.939	
6	Puerto Rico	5	0	5	0	0	15	0.000	277	379	0.731	

Source: FIVB
Rules for classification: Tiebreakers

=== Knockout stage ===
Quarter-finals
16 August
Brazil	2
China	3
16 August
South Korea	1
Netherlands	3
16 August
Russia	0
Serbia	3
16 August
Japan	0
United States	3

Semi-finals
18 August
China	3
Netherlands	1
18 August
Serbia	3
United States	2

Gold medal match
20 August
China	3
Serbia	1
Bronze medal match
20 August
Netherlands	1
United States	3

== Men's beach volleyball competition ==
=== Knockout stage ===
Round of 16
12 August
Carambula – Ranghieri (ITA)	0
Lupo – Nicolai (ITA)	2
13 August
Evandro – Pedro Solberg (BRA)	1
Barsouk – Liamin (RUS)	2
12 August
Krasilnikov – Semenov (RUS)	2
Cherif – Jefferson (QAT)	0
12 August
Doppler – Horst (AUT)	0
Díaz – González (CUB)	2
13 August
Dalhausser – Lucena (USA)	2
Huber – Seidl (AUT)	0
13 August
Alison – Bruno Schmidt (BRA)	2
Gavira – Herrera (ESP)	0
12 August
Ontiveros – Virgen (MEX)	0
Nummerdor – Varenhorst (NED)	2
13 August
Saxton – Schalk (CAN)	0
Brouwer – Meeuwsen (NED)	2

Quarter-finals
15 August
Lupo – Nicolai (ITA)	2
Barsouk – Liamin (RUS)	1
15 August
Krasilnikov – Semenov (RUS)	2
Díaz – González (CUB)	1
15 August
Dalhausser – Lucena (USA)	1
Alison – Bruno Schmidt (BRA)	2
15 August
Nummerdor – Varenhorst (NED)	0
Brouwer – Meeuwsen (NED)	2

Semi-finals
16 August
Lupo – Nicolai (ITA)	2
Krasilnikov – Semenov (RUS)	1
16 August
Alison – Bruno Schmidt (BRA)	2
Brouwer – Meeuwsen (NED)	1

Gold medal
18 August
Lupo – Nicolai (ITA)	0
Alison – Bruno Schmidt (BRA)	2
Bronze medal
18 August
Krasilnikov – Semenov (RUS)	0
Brouwer – Meeuwsen (NED)	2

== Women's beach volleyball competition ==
=== Knockout stage ===
Round of 16
12 August
Larissa – Talita (BRA)	2
Borger – Büthe (GER)	0
13 August
Meppelink – Van Iersel (NED)	1
Heidrich – Zumkehr (SUI)	2
13 August
Bansley – Pavan (CAN)	2
Broder – Valjas (CAN)	0
13 August
Forrer – Vergé-Dépré (SUI)	0
Ludwig – Walkenhorst (GER)	2
12 August
Ross – Walsh Jennings (USA)	2
Menegatti – Giombini (ITA)	0
13 August
Brzostek – Kołosińska (POL)	1
Bawden – Clancy (AUS)	2
12 August
Wang – Yue (CHN)	0
Ágatha – Bárbara (BRA)	2
12 August
Birlova – Ukolova (RUS)	2
Elsa – Liliana (ESP)	0

Quarter-finals
14 August
Larissa – Talita (BRA)	2
Heidrich – Zumkehr (SUI)	1
14 August
Bansley – Pavan (CAN)	0
Ludwig – Walkenhorst (GER)	2
14 August
Ross – Walsh Jennings (USA)	2
Bawden – Clancy (AUS)	0
14 August
Ágatha – Bárbara (BRA)	2
Birlova – Ukolova (RUS)	0

Semi-finals
16 August
Larissa – Talita (BRA)	0
Ludwig – Walkenhorst (GER)	2
16 August
Ross – Walsh Jennings (USA)	0
Ágatha – Bárbara (BRA)	2

Gold medal
17 August
Ludwig – Walkenhorst (GER)	2
Ágatha – Bárbara (BRA)	0
Bronze medal
17 August
Larissa – Talita (BRA)	1
Ross – Walsh Jennings (USA)	2

== Medal summary ==
=== Medal table ===
* Host nation (Brazil)

Rank	Nation	Gold	Silver	Bronze	Total
1	Brazil*	2	1	0	3
2	China	1	0	0	1
2	Germany	1	0	0	1
4	Italy	0	2	0	2
5	Serbia	0	1	0	1
6	United States	0	0	3	3
7	Netherlands	0	0	1	1
Totals (7 entries)		4	4	4	12

=== Medalists ===
==== Indoor volleyball ====
Event	Gold	Silver	Bronze
Men's indoor	Brazil; Bruno Rezende (c); Éder Carbonera; Wallace de Souza; William Arjona; Sérgio Santos (L); Luiz Felipe Fonteles; Maurício Souza; Douglas Souza; Lucas Saatkamp; Evandro Guerra; Ricardo Lucarelli; Maurício Borges Silva	Italy; Daniele Sottile; Luca Vettori; Osmany Juantorena; Simone Giannelli; Salvatore Rossini; Ivan Zaytsev; Filippo Lanza; Simone Buti; Massimo Colaci (L); Matteo Piano; Emanuele Birarelli (c); Oleg Antonov	United States; Matthew Anderson; Aaron Russell; Taylor Sander; David Lee (c); Kawika Shoji; Reid Priddy; Murphy Troy; Thomas Jaeschke; Micah Christenson; Maxwell Holt; David Smith; Erik Shoji (L)
Women's indoor	China; Yuan Xinyue; Zhu Ting; Yang Fangxu; Gong Xiangyu; Wei Qiuyue; Zhang Changning; Liu Xiaotong; Xu Yunli; Hui Ruoqi (c); Lin Li (L); Ding Xia; Yan Ni	Serbia; Bianka Buša; Jovana Brakočević; Bojana Živković; Tijana Malešević; Brankica Mihajlović; Maja Ognjenović (c); Stefana Veljković; Jelena Nikolić; Jovana Stevanović; Milena Rašić; Silvija Popović (L); Tijana Bošković	United States; Alisha Glass; Kayla Banwarth (L); Courtney Thompson; Rachael Adams; Carli Lloyd; Jordan Larson-Burbach; Kelly Murphy; Christa Harmotto-Dietzen (c); Kimberly Hill; Foluke Akinradewo; Kelsey Robinson; Karsta Lowe

==== Beach volleyball ====
Event	Gold	Silver	Bronze
Men's beach	Brazil; Alison Cerutti; Bruno Oscar Schmidt	Italy; Daniele Lupo; Paolo Nicolai	Netherlands; Alexander Brouwer; Robert Meeuwsen
Women's beach	Germany; Laura Ludwig; Kira Walkenhorst	Brazil; Ágatha Bednarczuk; Bárbara Seixas	United States; Kerri Walsh Jennings; April Ross

== See also ==
- Volleyball at the 2016 Summer Paralympics
