= 2014–2016 CAVB Beach Volleyball Continental Cup =

The 2015 2014–2016 CAVB Beach Volleyball Continental Cup were a beach volleyball double-gender event. The winners of the event will qualify for the 2016 Summer Olympics

== Men ==
=== Round 1 ===
Pool	1st	2nd	3rd	4th	5th
1	Tunisia	Morocco	Algeria	–	–
2	Senegal	The Gambia	Cape Verde	–	–
3	Sierra Leone	Guinea	Guinea-Bissau	–	–
4	Ghana	Ivory Coast	Burkina Faso	–	–
5	Benin	Nigeria	Niger	Togo	
6	MERGE WITH POOL 7	–	–	–	–
7	Republic of the Congo	Democratic Republic of the Congo	Gabon	Chad	–
8	Burundi	Kenya	Tanzania	–	–
9	Egypt	Rwanda	Uganda	Sudan	–
10	South Africa	Mozambique	Botswana	Swaziland	Lesotho
11	Angola	Zimbabwe	Namibia	–	–
12	Mauritius	Seychelles	–	–	–

- 1st and 2nd placed advanced to 2nd round

=== Round 2 ===
Pool	1st	2nd	3rd	4th
A	Tunisia	Morocco	Sierra Leone	Nigeria
B	Ghana	The Gambia	Ivory Coast	–
C	Angola	Rwanda	Zimbabwe	Egypt
D	Kenya	Mozambique	Burundi	Mauritius

- 1st, 2nd, and 3rd placed advanced to 3rd round.

== Women ==
=== Round 1 ===
Pool	1st	2nd	3rd	4th	5th
1	Morocco	Algeria	Tunisia	–	–
2	The Gambia	Senegal	–	–	–
3	Guinea	Sierra Leone	Guinea-Bissau	–	–
4	Ghana	Burkina Faso	Ivory Coast	–	–
5	Niger	Nigeria	Togo	Benin	–
6	CANCEL	–	–	–	–
7	Democratic Republic of the Congo	Republic of the Congo	Gabon	–	–
8	Kenya	Burundi	Tanzania	–	–
9	Rwanda	Egypt	Uganda	–	–
10	South Africa	Mozambique	Swaziland	Lesotho	–
11	Angola	Namibia	Zimbabwe	–	–
12	Mauritius	Seychelles	–	–	–

- 1st and 2nd place advanced to 2nd round

=== Round 2 ===
Pool	1st	2nd	3rd	4th
A	Morocco	Nigeria	Sierra Leone	–
B	The Gambia	Ghana	Burkina Faso	–
C	Egypt	Rwanda	Angola	Namibia
D	Mozambique	Kenya	Mauritius	Burundi

- 1st, 2nd, and 3rd placed advanced to 3rd round.
