= 2014–2016 NORCECA Beach Volleyball Continental Cup =

The 2015 2014–2016 NORCECA Beach Volleyball Continental Cup were a beach volleyball double-gender event. The winners of the event will qualify for the 2016 Summer Olympics

== Men ==
=== Round 1 ===
==== AFECAVOL ====
- Host: San Juan del Sur, Nicaragua
- Dates: February 13–15, 2015

Date	Team	Score	Team
13 Feb 2015	Guatemala	4–0	Belize
13 Feb 2015	Nicaragua	4–0	Honduras
13 Feb 2015	El Salvador	4–0	Panama
14 Feb 2015	Costa Rica	3–1	Nicaragua
14 Feb 2015	Guatemala	3–1	El Salvador
14 Feb 2015	Panama	3–1	Belize
15 Feb 2015	Guatemala	3–1	Costa Rica
15 Feb 2015	El Salvador	3–1	Honduras
15 Feb 2015	Nicaragua	4–0	Panama

- Golden set for third place Nicaragua 15–7 El Salvador

Ranked	Team
1	Guatemala
2	Costa Rica
3	Nicaragua
4	El Salvador
5	Honduras
5	Panama
7	Belize

==== ECVA ====
- Host: Castaways, Antigua and Barbuda
- Dates: April 24–26, 2015

Ranked	Team
1	Saint Lucia
2	Antigua and Barbuda
3	St. Kitts & Nevis
4	Dominica
5	Saint Vincent and the Grenadines
6	Sint Maarten
7	Grenada
9	British Virgin Islands
10	Anguilla
11	Bermuda

==== CAZOVA ====
- Host: Chaguanas, Trinidad and Tobago
- Dates: May 8–10, 2015

Ranked	Team
1	Trinidad and Tobago
2	Jamaica
3	Curacao
4	Virgin Islands
5	Barbados
6	Suriname
7	Guadeloupe
8	Cayman Islands
9	Aruba
10	Haiti
11	Bahamas
12	Bonaire
13	Martinique
14	Turks & Caicos

== Women ==
=== Round 1 ===
==== AFECAVOL ====
- Host: San Juan del Sur, Nicaragua
- Dates: February 13–15, 2015

Date	Team	Score	Team
13 Feb 2015	Guatemala	4–0	Panama
13 Feb 2015	El Salvador	4–0	Belize
13 Feb 2015	Nicaragua	4–0	Honduras
14 Feb 2015	Guatemala	4–0	El Salvador
14 Feb 2015	Costa Rica	3–1	Nicaragua
14 Feb 2015	Belize	3–1	Panama
15 Feb 2015	Guatemala	2–3	Costa Rica
15 Feb 2015	El Salvador	4–0	Honduras
15 Feb 2015	Nicaragua	4–0	Belize

- Golden set for third place Nicaragua 15–7 El Salvador

Ranked	Team
1	Costa Rica
2	Guatemala
3	Nicaragua
4	El Salvador
5	Belize
5	Honduras
7	Panama

==== ECVA ====
- Host: Castaways, Antigua and Barbuda
- Dates: April 24–26, 2015

Ranked	Team
1	Saint Lucia
2	Antigua and Barbuda
3	Saint Martin
4	St. Kitts & Nevis
5	Dominica
6	Grenada
7	Bermuda
8	Saint Vincent and the Grenadines
9	British Virgin Islands
10	Sint Maarten
11	Anguilla

==== CAZOVA ====
- Host: Ocho Rios, Jamaica
- Dates: May 8–10, 2015

Ranked	Team
1	Jamaica
2	Cayman Islands
3	Trinidad and Tobago
4	Barbados
5	Suriname
6	Virgin Islands
7	Haiti
8	Guadeloupe
9	Curacao
10	Martinique
11	Bahamas
12	Aruba
