= 2014–2016 AVC Beach Volleyball Continental Cup =

The 2014–2016 AVC Beach Volleyball Continental Cup were a beach volleyball double-gender event. The winners of the event qualified for the 2016 Summer Olympics

== Men ==
=== Preliminary round ===
==== Central Asia ====
===== Subzonal =====
- Host: Malé, Maldives

19–21 January 2015

Pos	Team	Pld	W	L	Pts	IND	PAK	NEP
1	India	2	2	0	4	—	2–0	2–0
2	Pakistan	2	1	1	2	0–2	—	2–0
3	Nepal	2	0	2	0	0–2	0–2	—

Source: AVC

Pos	Team	Pld	W	L	Pts	MDV	AFG	BAN
1	Maldives	2	2	0	4	—	2–0	2–0
2	Afghanistan	2	1	1	2	0–2	—	2–0
3	Bangladesh	2	0	2	0	0–2	0–2	—

Source: AVC

Semifinals
22 January 2015
India	2
Afghanistan	1
22 January 2015
Maldives	0
Pakistan	2

Final
23 January 2015
India	2
Pakistan	1
3rd place
23 January 2015
Afghanistan	1
Maldives	2

- India, Pakistan and Maldives advanced to the zonal round.

===== Zonal =====
- Host: Kozhikode, India

Quarterfinals
18 December 2015
Pakistan	0
India	2
18 December 2015
Sri Lanka	2
Maldives	0

Semifinals
19 December 2015
Iran	2
India	0
19 December 2015
Sri Lanka	0
Kazakhstan	2

Final
20 December 2015
Iran	1
Kazakhstan	2
3rd place
20 December 2015
India	2
Sri Lanka	1

5th place
19 December 2015
Pakistan	0
Maldives	2

- Kazakhstan advanced to the final round.
- Iran and India advanced to the semifinal round.

==== Eastern Asia ====
===== Subzonal =====
- Host: Kaohsiung, Taiwan

7–9 November 2014

Pos	Team	Pld	W	L	Pts	TPE	KOR	MGL	MAC
1	Chinese Taipei	3	3	0	6	—	2–0	2–0	2–0
2	South Korea	3	2	1	4	0–2	—	2–0	2–0
3	Mongolia	3	1	2	2	0–2	0–2	—	2–0
4	Macau	3	0	3	0	0–2	0–2	0–2	—

Source: FIVB
- Chinese Taipei, South Korea and Mongolia advanced to the zonal round.

===== Zonal =====
- Host: Boryeong, South Korea

Quarterfinals
5 August 2015
Chinese Taipei	2
South Korea	0
5 August 2015
Hong Kong	2
Mongolia	0

Semifinals
6 August 2015
Japan	2
Chinese Taipei	0
6 August 2015
Hong Kong	0
China	2

Final
7 August 2015
Japan	2
China	0
3rd place
7 August 2015
Chinese Taipei	2
Hong Kong	1

5th place
6 August 2015
South Korea	1
Mongolia	2

- Japan advanced to the final round.
- China and Chinese Taipei advanced to the semifinal round.

==== Oceania ====
===== Subzonal =====
- Host: Sydney, Australia

17–18 November 2014

Pos	Team	Pld	W	L	Pts	COK	FIJ	TUV
1	Cook Islands	2	2	0	4	—	2–0	2–1
2	Fiji	2	1	1	2	0–2	—	2–1
3	Tuvalu	2	0	2	0	1–2	1–2	—

Source: AVC

Pos	Team	Pld	W	L	Pts	VAN	ASA	TGA
1	Vanuatu	2	2	0	4	—	2–0	2–0
2	American Samoa	2	1	1	2	0–2	—	2–0
3	Tonga	2	0	2	0	0–2	0–2	—

Source: AVC

Semifinals
18 November 2014
Cook Islands	2
American Samoa	0
18 November 2014
Vanuatu	2
Fiji	1

Final
19 November 2014
Cook Islands	0
Vanuatu	2
3rd place
19 November 2014
American Samoa	2
Fiji	1

5th place
19 November 2014
Tuvalu	2
Tonga	0

- Vanuatu, Cook Islands and American Samoa advanced to the zonal round.

===== Zonal =====
- Host: Rarotonga, Cook Islands

Quarterfinals
2 November 2015
Cook Islands	2
Vanuatu	0
2 November 2015
Samoa	0
American Samoa	2

Semifinals
3 November 2015
Australia	2
Cook Islands	0
3 November 2015
American Samoa	0
New Zealand	2

Final
4 November 2015
Australia	1
New Zealand	2
3rd place
4 November 2015
Cook Islands	0
American Samoa	2

- Australia (as the hosts) and New Zealand advanced to the final round.
- American Samoa and Cook Islands advanced to the semifinal round.

==== Southeastern Asia ====
===== Subzonal =====
- Host: Khlong Luang, Thailand

10 November 2014

Pos	Team	Pld	W	L	Pts	CAM	MAS	SIN
1	Cambodia	2	2	0	4	—	2–1	2–0
2	Malaysia	2	1	1	2	1–2	—	2–0
3	Singapore	2	0	2	0	0–2	0–2	—

Source: AVC

Pos	Team	Pld	W	L	Pts	PHI	LAO	MYA
1	Philippines	2	2	0	4	—	2–0	2–0
2	Laos	2	1	1	2	0–2	—	2–1
3	Myanmar	2	0	2	0	0–2	1–2	—

Source: AVC

Semifinals
11 November 2014
Cambodia	2
Laos	0
11 November 2014
Philippines	2
Malaysia	1

Final
11 November 2014
Cambodia	2
Philippines	0
3rd place
11 November 2014
Laos	0
Malaysia	2

5th place
11 November 2014
Singapore	2
Myanmar	0

- Cambodia, Philippines and Malaysia advanced to the zonal round.

===== Zonal =====
- Host: Nong Khai, Thailand

Quarterfinals
2 April 2015
Philippines	2
Cambodia	1
2 April 2015
Vietnam	2
Malaysia	0

Semifinals
3 April 2015
Indonesia	2
Philippines	0
3 April 2015
Vietnam	0
Thailand	2

Final
4 April 2015
Indonesia	2
Thailand	0
3rd place
4 April 2015
Philippines	2
Vietnam	0

5th place
3 April 2015
Cambodia	2
Malaysia	1

- Indonesia advanced to the final round.
- Thailand and Philippines advanced to the semifinal round.

==== Western Asia ====
- Host: Doha, Qatar

Final
5 January 2016
Qatar	2
Oman	0

- Qatar advanced to the final round.
- Oman advanced to the semifinal round.

=== Semifinal round ===
- Host: Kalasin, Thailand

Quarterfinals
12 May 2016
Iran	2
Chinese Taipei	0
12 May 2016
Oman	2
Cook Islands	0

Semifinals
13 May 2016
Thailand	1
Iran	2
13 May 2016
Oman	0
China	2

Final
14 May 2016
Iran	2
China	0
3rd place
14 May 2016
Thailand	0
Oman	2

- Iran and China advanced to the final round.

=== Final round ===
- Host: Cairns, Australia

Quarterfinals
24 June 2016
Australia	2
Indonesia	0
24 June 2016
New Zealand	1
China	2
24 June 2016
Qatar	2
Iran	0
24 June 2016
Kazakhstan	2
Japan	0

Semifinals
25 June 2016
Australia	0
China	2
25 June 2016
Qatar	2
Kazakhstan	0

Final
26 June 2016
China	0
Qatar	2
3rd place
26 June 2016
Australia	1
Kazakhstan	2

== Women ==
=== Preliminary round ===
==== Central Asia ====
- Host: Kozhikode, India

Quarterfinals
18 December 2015
Maldives	0
Nepal	2

Semifinals
19 December 2015
Kazakhstan	2
Nepal	0
19 December 2015
India	1
Sri Lanka	2

Final
20 December 2015
Kazakhstan	2
Sri Lanka	0
3rd place
20 December 2015
Nepal	0
India	2

- Kazakhstan advanced to the final round.
- Sri Lanka and India advanced to the semifinal round.

==== Eastern Asia ====
===== Subzonal =====
- Host: Kaohsiung, Taiwan

7–9 November 2014

Pos	Team	Pld	W	L	Pts	HKG	KOR	MGL	MAC
1	Hong Kong	3	3	0	6	—	2–0	2–0	2–0
2	South Korea	3	2	1	4	0–2	—	2–0	2–0
3	Mongolia	3	1	2	2	0–2	0–2	—	2–0
4	Macau	3	0	3	0	0–2	0–2	0–2	—

Source: FIVB
- Hong Kong, South Korea and Mongolia advanced to the zonal round.

===== Zonal =====
- Host: Boryeong, South Korea

Quarterfinals
5 August 2015
Hong Kong	2
South Korea	0
5 August 2015
Chinese Taipei	2
Mongolia	0

Semifinals
6 August 2015
China	2
Hong Kong	0
6 August 2015
Chinese Taipei	0
Japan	2

Final
7 August 2015
China	2
Japan	0
3rd place
7 August 2015
Hong Kong	1
Chinese Taipei	2

5th place
6 August 2015
South Korea	1
Mongolia	2

- China advanced to the final round.
- Japan and Chinese Taipei advanced to the semifinal round.

==== Oceania ====
===== Subzonal =====
- Host: Sydney, Australia

17–18 November 2014

Pos	Team	Pld	W	L	Pts	GUM	FIJ	TUV	TGA
1	Guam	3	3	0	6	—	2–1	2–0	2–0
2	Fiji	3	2	1	4	1–2	—	2–0	2–0
3	Tuvalu	3	1	2	2	0–2	0–2	—	2–1
4	Tonga	3	0	3	0	0–2	0–2	1–2	—

Source: AVC

Semifinals
18 November 2014
Guam	2
Tonga	0
18 November 2014
Fiji	2
Tuvalu	0

Final
19 November 2014
Guam	2
Fiji	1
3rd place
19 November 2014
Tonga	0
Tuvalu	2

- Guam, Fiji and Tuvalu advanced to the zonal round.

===== Zonal =====
- Host: Rarotonga, Cook Islands

Quarterfinals
2 November 2015
Fiji	2
Guam	0
2 November 2015
New Zealand	2
Tuvalu	0

Semifinals
3 November 2015
Australia	2
Fiji	0
3 November 2015
New Zealand	0
Vanuatu	2

Final
4 November 2015
Australia	2
Vanuatu	0
3rd place
4 November 2015
Fiji	0
New Zealand	2

- Australia (as the hosts) and Vanuatu advanced to the final round.
- New Zealand and Fiji advanced to the semifinal round.

==== Southeastern Asia ====
===== Subzonal =====
- Host: Khlong Luang, Thailand

11–12 November 2014

Pos	Team	Pld	W	L	Pts	MAS	PHI	SIN	MYA
1	Malaysia	3	3	0	6	—	2–0	2–0	2–0
2	Philippines	3	2	1	4	0–2	—	2–1	2–1
3	Singapore	3	1	2	2	0–2	1–2	—	2–1
4	Myanmar	3	0	3	0	0–2	1–2	1–2	—

Source: AVC
- Malaysia, Philippines and Singapore advanced to the zonal round.

===== Zonal =====
- Host: Nong Khai, Thailand

Quarterfinals
2 April 2015
Philippines	0
Malaysia	2
2 April 2015
Indonesia	2
Singapore	0

Semifinals
3 April 2015
Thailand	2
Malaysia	0
3 April 2015
Indonesia	2
Vietnam	1

Final
5 April 2015
Thailand	2
Indonesia	0
3rd place
5 April 2015
Malaysia	0
Vietnam	2

5th place
3 April 2015
Philippines	2
Singapore	0

- Thailand advanced to the final round.
- Indonesia and Vietnam advanced to the semifinal round.

=== Semifinal round ===
- Host: Kalasin, Thailand

Quarterfinals
12 May 2016
Chinese Taipei	2
Sri Lanka	0

Semifinals
13 May 2016
Japan	2
Chinese Taipei	0
13 May 2016
New Zealand	0
Indonesia	2

Final
14 May 2016
Japan	2
Indonesia	0
3rd place
14 May 2016
Chinese Taipei	2
New Zealand	1

- Japan, Indonesia and Chinese Taipei advanced to the final round.

=== Final round ===
- Host: Cairns, Australia

Quarterfinals
24 June 2016
Australia	2
Chinese Taipei	0
24 June 2016
Japan	2
Thailand	1
24 June 2016
Indonesia	0
China	2
24 June 2016
Kazakhstan	0
Vanuatu	2

Semifinals
25 June 2016
Australia	2
Japan	1
25 June 2016
China	1
Vanuatu	2

Final
26 June 2016
Australia	2
Vanuatu	0
3rd place
26 June 2016
Japan	0
China	2
