= Francisco Ducasse =

Chilean sailor

Personal information
- Born: 3 December 1996 (age 29)

Sport
- Country: Chile
- Sport: Sailing

Francisco Ducasse (born 3 December 1996) is a Chilean competitive sailor. He competed at the 2016 Summer Olympics in Rio de Janeiro, in the men's 470 class.
