= 2016 FIVB Beach Volleyball World Continental Cup =

2016 FIVB Beach Volleyball World Continental Cup was played in Sochi, Russia 6 - 10 July 2016, and was the final qualifying tournament for the 2016 Summer Olympics.

== Men ==
=== Result ===
Qualified for the 2016 Summer Olympics:

- Russia
- Canada

== Women ==
=== Pool A ===
Date	Team A	Country	Team B	Country	Score	Duration
08-Jul 18:00	Ukolova/Barsuk	(Russia)	Michelle/Filippo	(Paraguay)	2-0	0:20
08-Jul 17:10	Birlova/Makroguzova	(Russia)	Erika/Pati	(Paraguay)	2-0	0:27
08-Jul 21:00	Xue/X. Y. Xia	(China)	Slukova/Hermannova	(Czech Republic)	1-0	0:10
08-Jul 17:20	Chen Chunxia/Tang N. Y.	(China)	Slukova/Hermannova	(Czech Republic)	1-2	0:48
08-Jul 16:30	Xue/X. Y. Xia	(China)	Kolocova/Kvapilova	(Czech Republic)	2-0	0:32
08-Jul 11:00	Erika/Pati	(Paraguay)	Rios/Santoyo	(Mexico)	1-2	0:40
08-Jul 10:00	Michelle/Filippo	(Paraguay)	Estrada/Orellana	(Mexico)	1-2	0:46
08-Jul 11:00	Chen Chunxia/Tang N. Y.	(China)	Birlova/Makroguzova	(Russia)	2-1	0:54
08-Jul 10:10	Xue/X. Y. Xia	(China)	Ukolova/Barsuk	(Russia)	2-1	0:54
07-Jul 10:00	Kolocova/Kvapilova	(Czech Republic)	Rios/Santoyo	(Mexico)	2-1	0:44
07-Jul 09:00	Slukova/Hermannova	(Czech Republic)	Estrada/Orellana	(Mexico)	2-0	0:27
07-Jul 10:00	Chen Chunxia/Tang N. Y.	(China)	Michelle/Filippo	(Paraguay)	2-0	0:30
07-Jul 09:10	Xue/X. Y. Xia	(China)	Erika/Pati	(Paraguay)	2-0	0:28
07-Jul 18:00	Kolocova/Kvapilova	(Czech Republic)	Birlova/Makroguzova	(Russia)	0-2	0:33
07-Jul 17:10	Slukova/Hermannova	(Czech Republic)	Ukolova/Barsuk	(Russia)	1-2	0:50
07-Jul 19:00	Chen Chunxia/Tang N. Y.	(China)	Rios/Santoyo	(Mexico)	2-0	0:30
07-Jul 18:10	Xue/X. Y. Xia	(China)	Estrada/Orellana	(Mexico)	2-0	0:29
06-Jul 18:00	Ukolova/Barsuk	(Russia)	Rios/Santoyo	(Mexico)	2-0	0:25
06-Jul 17:10	Birlova/Makroguzova	(Russia)	Estrada/Orellana	(Mexico)	2-0	0:32
06-Jul 17:20	Kolocova/Kvapilova	(Czech Republic)	Michelle/Filippo	(Paraguay)	2-0	0:32
06-Jul 16:30	Slukova/Hermannova	(Czech Republic)	Erika/Pati	(Paraguay)	2-0	0:25

==== Table ====
Pos	Team	Pld	W	L	Pts	SW	SL	SR	SPW	SPL	SPR	Qualification
1	China	4	4	0	8	16	4	4.000	385	330	1.167	Semifinal
2	Russia	4	3	1	7	14	5	2.800	369	273	1.352	Quarterfinal
3	Czech Republic	4	2	2	6	11	9	1.222	366	319	1.147	Quarterfinal
4	Mexico	4	1	3	5	5	14	0.357	290	359	0.808	
5	Paraguay	4	0	4	4	2	16	0.125	233	362	0.644	

Source: FIVB

=== Pool B ===
Pos	Team	Pld	W	L	Pts	SW	SL	SR	SPW	SPL	SPR	Qualification
1	Austria	3	3	0	6	11	3	3.667	272	229	1.188	Semifinal
2	Vanuatu	3	2	1	5	8	7	1.143	246	245	1.004	Quarterfinal
3	Ukraine	3	1	2	4	6	7	0.857	232	226	1.027	Quarterfinal
4	Colombia	3	0	3	3	3	11	0.273	217	267	0.813	

Source: FIVB

=== Knockout stage ===
Quarterfinals
9 July
Czech Republic	2
Vanuatu	1
9 July
Russia	2
Ukraine	0

Semifinals
10 July
China	1
Czech Republic	2
10 July
Russia	2
Austria	1

=== Result ===
Qualified for the 2016 Summer Olympics:

- Czech Republic
- Russia

== See also ==
- Beach volleyball at the 2016 Summer Olympics – Women's qualification
