= Karin and Nina =

Swedish beach volleyball team

Karin Lundqvist and Nina Grawender are professional beach volleyball players from Sweden. They started playing together in February 2013 and by achieving good results on the European Tour and World Tour they were selected as Sweden's national team in September 2013.

Karin and Nina are coached by Wesley Pinheiro, from Brazil.

Karin Lundqvist and Nina Grawender's best results in 2013 are 9th place at the European Championships in Klagenfurt, Austria, and first place at the Nevza tournaments in Oslo and Gothenburg.

== Karin Lundqvist ==
Karin Lundqvist was born on October 5, 1981, in Stockholm, Sweden. She started playing professional beach volleyball in 2004 and has since then been Swedish champion five times (2004, 2007, 2010, 2011, 2012), won the Swedish Beach Tour eight times (2001, 2004, 2005, 2007, 2008, 2010, 2011, 2012) and been named Sweden's player of the year six times (2005, 2007, 2010, 2011, 2012, 2013).

Karin played professional beach volleyball in Brazil fall 2009 until spring 2013. She was ranked top 5 as her best ranking in Brazil and got a 3rd place as her best result in Salvador 2012. In 2013 she teamed up with a Swedish player to pursue her dream of representing Sweden in the Olympic Games of Rio 2016.

== Nina Grawender ==
Nina Grawender was born on October 15, 1987, in Gothenburg, Sweden.

== Results ==
| Year | Tournament | Place |
|---|---|---|
| 2013 | CEV Satellite, Montpellier, France | 5 |
| 2013 | European Championships 2013, Klagenfurt, Austria | 9 |
| 2013 | Northern Europe ZA 2013, Oslo, Norway | 1 |
| 2013 | Northern Europe ZA 2013, Gothenburg, Sweden | 1 |
| 2013 | Grand Slam 2013, Xiamen, China | 17 |
| 2013 | Open 2013, Phuket, Thailand | 9 |
