= 2011 FIVB Women's Club World Championship squads =

This article shows all participating team squads at the 2011 FIVB Women's Club World Championship, held from October 8 to 14, 2011 in Doha, Qatar.

== Pool A ==
=== Mirador Santo Domingo ===
- Head coach: (Dominican Republic) Wilson Sánchez

Number	Player	Position
1	(Dominican Republic) Marianne Fersola	Middle blocker
2	(Dominican Republic) Erasma Moreno	Wing spiker
5	(Dominican Republic) Deborah Constanzo	Opposite
6	(Dominican Republic) Carmen Rosa Caso	Libero
8	(Dominican Republic) Pamela Soriano	Middle blocker
9	(Dominican Republic) Celenia Toribio	Middle blocker
10	(Dominican Republic) Yeniffer Ramírez	Wing spiker
11	(Dominican Republic) Jeoselyna Rodríguez	Opposite
12	(Dominican Republic) Francia Jackson (c)	Setter
13	(Dominican Republic) Yonkaira Peña	Wing spiker
14	(Dominican Republic) Erika Mota	Wing spiker
15	(Dominican Republic) Brayelin Elizabeth Martínez	Wing spiker

=== VakıfBank Türk Telekom Istanbul ===
- Head coach: (Italy) Giovanni Guidetti

Number	Player	Position
1	(Turkey) Songül	Libero
2	(Turkey) Gözde (c)	Outside hitter
3	(Turkey) Gizem	Libero
4	(Turkey) Nilay	Setter
6	(United States) Lena	Outside hitter
7	(Poland) Małgorzata Glinka	Opposite hitter
8	(Turkey) Melis	Middle blocker
9	(Turkey) Özge	Setter
10	(Turkey) Güldeniz	Outside hitter
11	(Turkey) Bahar	Middle blocker
12	(Serbia) Jelena Nikolić	Outside hitter
13	(Germany) Christiane Fürst	Middle blocker

=== Kenya Prisons ===
- Head coach: (Kenya) David Lingaho

Number	Player	Position
1	(Kenya) Wachu	
2	(Kenya) Everlyne Makuto	
3	(Kenya) Diana	
4	(Kenya) Esther Mwombe	
6	(Kenya) Florence Bosire	
7	(Kenya) Elisheba	
9	(Kenya) Elizah	
11	(Kenya) Loice	
12	(Kenya) Lydia Maiyo	
14	(Kenya) Mercy Moim	
15	(Kenya) Brackcides Khadambi (c)	
16	(Kenya) Judith Tarus	Libero

== Pool B ==
=== Rabita Baku ===
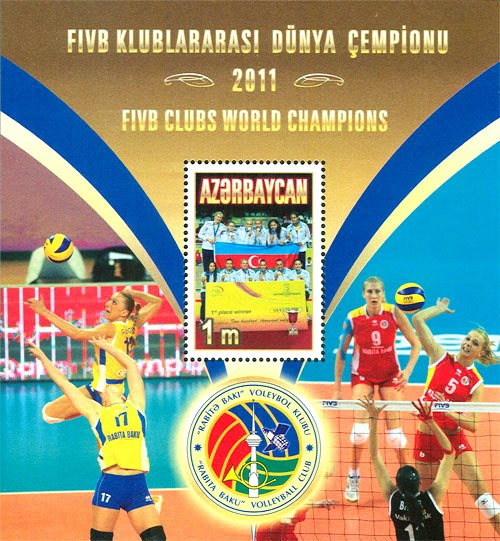
Stamps of Azerbaijan, 2011

- Head coach: (Serbia) Zoran Gajic

Number	Player	Position
1	(Bulgaria) Dobriana Rabadzhieva	Outside hitter
2	(Azerbaijan) Madina Aliyeva	
5	(Serbia) Nataša Krsmanović	Middle blocker
6	(Serbia) Jasna Majstorović	Outside hitter
8	(Serbia) Sivija Popović	Libero
9	(Azerbaijan) Natalya Mammadova (c)	Outside hitter / Opposite Hitter
11	(Turkey) Pelin	Setter
12	(Serbia) Mira Golubović	Middle blocker
13	(Croatia) Nataša Osmokrović	Opposite hitter
14	(Germany) Kathy Radzuweit	Middle blocker
15	(Serbia) Sanja Starović	Opposite hitter
17	(Ukraine) Iryna Zhukova	Setter

=== Sollys Nestlé Osasco ===
- Head coach: (Brazil) Luizomar de Moura

Number	Player	Position
1	(Brazil) Ivna	Outside hitter
3	(Brazil) Larissa	Middle blocker
4	(Brazil) Samara	Outside hitter
5	(Brazil) Adenízia	Middle blocker
7	(Brazil) Karine	Setter
9	(Brazil) Silvana	Outside hitter
10	(Brazil) Ana Maria	Setter
11	(Brazil) Bia	Middle blocker
12	(Brazil) Léia	Libero
13	(Brazil) Heloiza	Opposite hitter
17	(Brazil) Ju Costa (c)	Outside hitter
18	(Brazil) Camila Brait	Libero

=== Chang Bangkok ===
- Head coach: (Thailand) Kiattipong Radchatagriengkai

Number	Player	Position
1	(Thailand) B. Wanna	Libero
2	(Thailand) P. Piyanut	Libero
5	(Thailand) T. Pleumjit	Middle blocker
6	(Thailand) S. Onuma	Wing spiker
8	(Thailand) K. Utaiwan	Middle blocker
9	(Thailand) L. Wanitchaya	Wing spiker
10	(Thailand) A. Wilavan (c)	Wing spiker
11	(Thailand) H. Amporn	Middle blocker
12	(Thailand) C. Tapaphaipun	Libero
12	(Thailand) S. Kamonporn	Setter
13	(Thailand) T. Nootsara	Setter
15	(Thailand) K. Malika	Wing spiker
17	(Thailand) S. Kamonporn	Setter
