= 2009–10 Women's CEV Cup =

- League: Women's CEV Cup
- Sport: Volleyball

Women's CEV Cup seasons
- ← 2008–09 2010–11 →

The 2009–10 Women's CEV Cup was the 38th edition of the European CEV Cup volleyball club tournament, the former Top Teams Cup.

== Teams of the 2009–2010 ==
The number of participants on the basis of ranking list for European Cup Competitions

Rank	Country	The number of teams	Teams	
1	Italy	1	Yamamay Busto Arsizio	
2	Russia	1	Uralochka-NTMK Yekaterinburg	
3	Spain	1	Valeriano Alles Menorca	
4	France	2	Istres Ouest Provence Volley	Rocheville Le Cannet
5	Poland	2	Impel Gwardia Wrocław	PTPS Piła
6	Netherlands	2	Sliedrecht Sport	PND VC Weert
7	Turkey	2	Eczacıbaşı Zentiva	Türk Telekom Ankara
8	Switzerland	2	Voléro Zürich	Kanti Schaffhausen
9	Croatia	2	Volksbank Velika Gorica	ZOK Split 1700
10	Serbia	2	ZOK Dinamo Pančevo	ZOK Crvena Zvezda Beograd
11	Romania	2	Dinamo Romprest București	Volei 2004 Tomis Constanța
12	Austria	2	Sparkasse Klagenfurt	SVS Post Schwechat
13	Belgium	2	VDK Gent Dames	Dauphines Charleroi
14	Portugal	2	CS Madeira	Clube Desportivo Ribeirense
15	Azerbaijan	2	Azerrail Baku	Rabita Baku
16	Ukraine	1	Severodonchanka Sievierodonetsk	
17	Greece	1	Panathinaikos	
19	Slovenia	1	Nova KBM Branik Maribor	
21	Cyprus	1	AEL Limassol	
22	Germany	1	Schweriner SC	

== Play-off ==
=== 1/16 Finals ===
- 1st leg 2–3 December 2009
- 2nd leg 8–10 December 2009

The 16 winning teams from the 1/16 Finals will compete in the 1/8 Finals playing Home & Away matches. The losers of the 1/16 Final matches will qualify for the 3rd round in Challenge Cup.

Team #1	Results	Team #2
Rocheville Le Cannet (France)	3 – 1 (25–19, 25–19, 17–25, 25–17); 3 – 1 (19–25, 25–20, 25–18, 25–22)	(Netherlands) Sliedrecht Sport
Impel Gwardia Wrocław (Poland)	1 – 3 (20–25, 26–24, 15–25, 11–25); 1 – 3 (15–25, 25–23, 15–25, 23–25)	(Azerbaijan) Rabita Baku
SVS Post Schwechat (Austria)	2 – 3 (25–21, 25–27, 22–25, 25–21, 16–18); 0 – 3 (18–25, 20–25, 15–25)	(Azerbaijan) Azerrail Baku
Eczacıbaşı Zentiva (Turkey)	3 – 1 (22–25, 25–19, 25–12, 25–10); 3 – 1 (25–10, 16–25, 25–14, 25–20)	(Netherlands) PND VC Weert
Yamamay Busto Arsizio (Italy)	3 – 0 (25–14, 25–18, 25–17); 3 – 1 (25–12, 19–25, 25–15, 25–14)	(Croatia) Volksbank Velika Gorica
VDK Gent Dames (Belgium)	3 – 2 (25–23, 22–25, 25–21, 23–25, 15–11); 3 – 2 (10–25, 25–21, 19–25, 25–17, 15–9)	(Ukraine) Severodonchanka Sievierodonetsk
ZOK Split 1700 (Croatia)	2 – 3 (25–22, 23–25, 20–25, 25–19, 12–15); 1 – 3 (25–22, 9–25, 15–25, 14–25)	(Romania) Dinamo Romprest București
Schweriner SC (Germany)	3 – 0 (30–28, 25–23, 25–17); 3 – 0 (25–17, 25–23, 25–12)	(Switzerland) Kanti Schaffhausen
PTPS Piła (Poland)	3 – 2 (25–20, 25–23, 15–25, 19–25, 15–10); 3 – 2 (25–20, 15–25, 17–25, 25–21, 15–11)	(Switzerland) Voléro Zürich
AEL Limassol (Cyprus)	0 – 3 (17–25, 10–25, 14–25); 0 – 3 (21–25, 16–25, 16–25)	(Romania) Volei 2004 Tomis Constanța
Dauphines Charleroi (Belgium)	2 – 3 (28–26, 23–25, 25–21, 17–25, 10–15); 3 – 0 (25–14, 25–21, 25–20)	(Slovenia) Nova KBM Branik Maribor
Panathinaikos (Greece)	1 – 3 (16–25, 25–17, 23–25, 20–25); 0 – 3 (16–25, 20–25, 14–25)	(Russia) Uralochka-NTMK Yekaterinburg
Türk Telekom Ankara (Turkey)	w/o	(Serbia) ZOK Dinamo Pančevo
Sparkasse Klagenfurt (Austria)	1 – 3 (15–25, 14–25, 28–26, 21–25); 3 – 1 (25–17, 25–15, 13–25, 25–19); Golden Set: 15–12	(Portugal) Clube Desportivo Ribeirense
ZOK Crvena Zvezda Beograd (Serbia)	3 – 0 (25–10, 25–11, 25–5); 3 – 0 (25–10, 25–20, 25–18)	(Portugal) CS Madeira
Istres Ouest Provence Volley (France)	0 – 3 (18–25, 20–25, 16–25, 20–25); 1 – 3 (18–25, 25–23, 21–25, 21–25)	(Spain) Valeriano Alles Menorca

=== 1/8 Finals ===
- 1st leg 5–7 January 2010
- 2nd leg 12–14 January 2010

Team #1	Results	Team #2
Rocheville Le Cannet (France)	3 – 1 (25–22, 21–25, 25–22, 25–18); 0 – 3 (22–25, 21–25, 18–25)	(Azerbaijan) Rabita Baku
Azerrail Baku (Azerbaijan)	2 – 3 (25–23, 25–23, 21–25, 10–25, 15–17); 0 – 3 (15–25, 22–25, 15–25)	(Turkey) Eczacıbaşı Zentiva
Yamamay Busto Arsizio (Italy)	3 – 1 (23–25, 25–16, 25–16, 25–17); 3 – 1 (25–17, 23–25, 25–17, 27–25)	(Belgium) VDK Gent Dames
Dinamo Romprest București (Romania)	3 – 1 (25–23, 25–15, 16–25, 25–17); 0 – 3 (23–25, 22–25, 22–25)	(Germany) Schweriner SC
PTPS Piła (Poland)	0 – 3 (14–25, 15–25, 22–25); 0 – 3 (19–25, 10–25, 17–25)	(Romania) Volei 2004 Tomis Constanța
Dauphines Charleroi (Belgium)	1 – 3 (19–25, 25–23, 19–25, 19–25); 0 – 3 (13–25, 13–25, 13–25)	(Russia) Uralochka-NTMK Yekaterinburg
ZOK Dinamo Pančevo (Serbia)	3 – 1 (21–25, 28–26, 25–16, 25–21); 3 – 0 (25–19, 25–17, 25–19)	(Austria) Sparkasse Klagenfurt
ZOK Crvena Zvezda Beograd (Serbia)	3 – 0 (25–21, 25–16, 25–21); 1 – 3 (15–25, 25–18, 22–25, 20–25)	(Spain) Valeriano Alles Menorca

=== 1/4 Finals ===
- 1st leg 16–18 February 2010
- 2nd leg 23–25 February 2010

Team #1	Results	Team #2
Rabita Baku (Azerbaijan)	3 – 0 (25–20, 27–25, 25–16); 1 – 3 (23–25, 17–25, 25–21, 21–25)	(Turkey) Eczacıbaşı Zentiva
Yamamay Busto Arsizio (Italy)	3 – 2 (25–22, 21–25, 25–21, 17–25, 15–10); 3 – 1 (17–25, 25–19, 26–24, 25–18)	(Germany) Schweriner SC
Volei 2004 Tomis Constanța (Romania)	1 – 3 (24–26, 25–27, 25–11, 21–25); 1 – 3 (17–25, 20–25, 29–27, 21–25)	(Russia) Uralochka-NTMK Yekaterinburg
ZOK Dinamo Pančevo (Serbia)	0 – 3 (16–25, 12–25, 15–25); 0 – 3 (20–25, 12–25, 14–25)	(Serbia) ZOK Crvena Zvezda Beograd

== Final four ==
Baku, 20 & 21 March 2010:

Semi-finals
20 March
(Azerbaijan) Rabita Baku	2
(Italy) Yamamay Busto Arsizio	3
20 March
(Russia) Uralochka-NTMK Yekaterinburg	2
(Serbia) ZOK Crvena Zvezda Beograd	3

Final
21 March
(Italy) Yamamay Busto Arsizio	3
(Serbia) ZOK Crvena Zvezda Beograd	1
3rd place
21 March
(Azerbaijan) Rabita Baku	3
(Russia) Uralochka-NTMK Yekaterinburg	1

=== Semi-finals ===
	Score		Set 1	Set 2	Set 3	Set 4	Set 5
Rabita Baku (AZE)	2–3	Yamamay Busto Arsizio (ITA)	15–25	25–22	21–25	25–17	12–15
Uralochka-NTMK Yekaterinburg (RUS)	2–3	ZOK Crvena Zvezda Beograd (SRB)	25–21	18–25	23–25	31–29	11–15

=== Match 3/4 ===
	Score		Set 1	Set 2	Set 3	Set 4	Set 5
Rabita Baku (AZE)	3–1	Uralochka-NTMK Yekaterinburg (RUS)	16–25	25–12	25–22	25–16	

=== Match 1/2 ===
	Score		Set 1	Set 2	Set 3	Set 4	Set 5
Yamamay Busto Arsizio (ITA)	3–1	ZOK Crvena Zvezda Beograd (SRB)	22–25	25–22	25–12	25–22	

=== Awards ===
Winners:

- MVP: (Romania) Carmen Turlea (Yamamay Busto Arsizio)
- Best scorer: (Romania) Carmen Turlea (Yamamay Busto Arsizio)
- Best spiker: (Serbia) Sanja Starović (Rabita Baku)
- Best server: (Serbia) Stefana Veljković (ZOK Crvena Zvezda Beograd)
- Best blocker: (Italy) Lucia Crisanti (Yamamay Busto Arsizio)
- Best receiver: (Serbia) Tamara Rakić (ZOK Crvena Zvezda Beograd)
- Best libero: (Serbia) Silvija Popović (Rabita Baku)
- Best setter: (Serbia) Bojana Živković (ZOK Crvena Zvezda Beograd)
