= Starović =

Starović (Serbian: Старовић) is a Serbian surname. Notable people with the surname include:

- Milica Starović (born 1988), Serbian sprint canoer
- Sanja Starović (born 1983), Serbian volleyball player
- Saša Starović (born 1988), Serbian volleyball player, brother of Sanja
