= Kim Glass =

American volleyball player (born 1984)

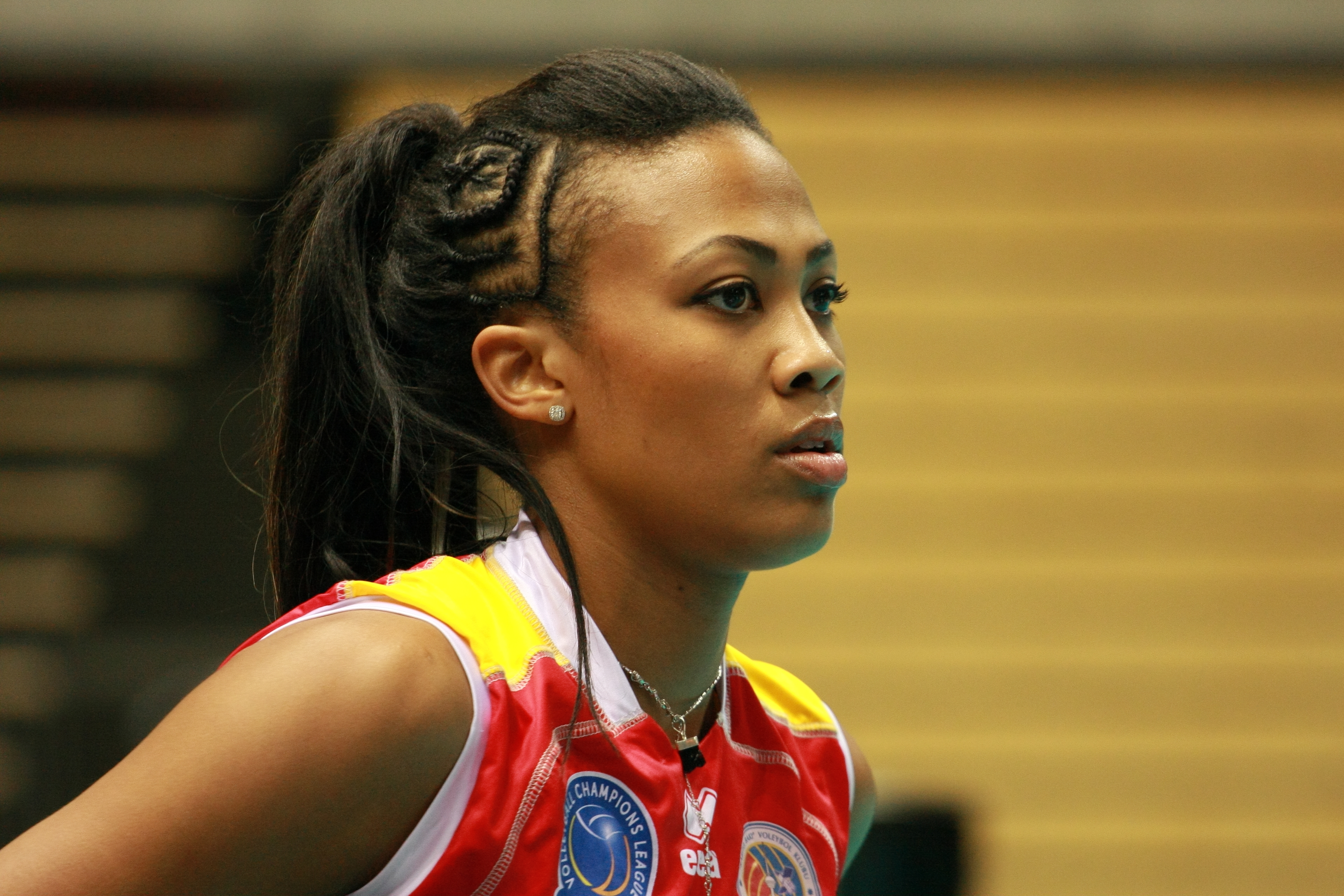
- Glass with Rabita Baku in 2012

Personal information
- Full name: Kimberly Marie Glass
- Born: August 18, 1984 (age 42); Los Angeles, California, U.S.
- Height: 6 ft 2.5 in (1.89 m)
- Spike: 314 cm (124 in)
- Block: 299 cm (118 in)

Volleyball information
- Position: Outside hitter
- Current club: Banana Boat / Praia Clube
- Number: 10

Career
Years
2002–2006
2006–2007
2007–2008
2008–2009
2009–2010
2010–2012
2012-2013
2013-2014
Teams
(United States) University of Arizona
(Puerto Rico) Pinkin de Corozal
(Turkey) Fenerbahçe
(Russia) Universitet Belgorod
(Czech Republic) Modřanská Prostějov
(Azerbaijan) Rabita Baku
(China) Guangdong Evergrande
(Brazil) Banana Boat / Praia Clube

National team
| 2007-2012 | United States |
Medal record
Women's volleyball
Representing the United States
Olympic Games
| Silver medal – second place | 2008 Beijing | Team |
World Cup
| Bronze medal – third place | 2007 Japan | Team |
Grand Prix
| Gold medal – first place | 2011 Macau | Team |
NORCECA Championship
| Gold medal – first place | 2011 Caguas |
Pan-American Cup
| Bronze medal – third place | 2011 Ciudad Juárez |

Kimberly Marie Glass (born August 18, 1984) is an American indoor volleyball player and model. She is 6 ft 2.5 in (189.2 cm) and plays as an outside hitter. She joined the U.S. national team on May 23, 2007. Glass made her first Olympic appearance at the 2008 Beijing Olympics, helping Team USA to a silver medal.

== High school and personal life ==
Glass was born in Los Angeles, California, to Sherman and Kathy Glass. She has two brothers, Darryl and Marcius, and two sisters, Shalana and Shaynce. She grew up in Lancaster, Pennsylvania, and attended Conestoga Valley High School where she was a three-year letterwinner. She was the 2001 Pennsylvania State Gatorade Player of the Year. She was the Lancaster-Lebanon League MVP in 2000 and 2001 and participated on the U.S. junior national team in 2001 that competed at the Women's Junior World Championships. She played club volleyball for Synergy for four years.

While in college, Glass tried out for Tyra Banks' show America's Next Top Model five times.

In 2011 Glass appeared in the Sports Illustrated Swimsuit Issue.

== Homelessness ==
=== Homeless for Charity ===
Glass frequently worked with the homeless population in Los Angeles. On "The Challenge: Champs vs. Stars", she chose to play for the charity Covenant House, which helps homeless youth.

=== Attack by Homeless Man ===
In July 2022, Glass's Instagram account stated that she was randomly attacked in Los Angeles by a homeless man. Reportedly while leaving a restaurant with a friend, 51-year-old Semeon Tesfamariam ran up to her and hit her in the face with a metal pipe, causing multiple facial fractures and eye injuries that required stitches. The pipe was possibly thrown.

== College highlights ==
Glass, a three-time American Volleyball Coaches Association All-American and four-time All-Pac-10 pick, is Arizona's career leader in kills with 2,151 and ranks third all-time in the Pac-10 in the same category. She averaged 5.27 kills, 2.84 digs, 0.70 blocks and 0.40 aces per game for the Wildcats. For her career, Glass had double-digit kills in 105 of her 115 matches played, along with 20 or more kills 54 times en route to a school-record 5.27 kills per game average. She holds the Arizona school record with 162 aces, and is third in career digs with 1,158. Glass provided 77 block solos, which ranks eighth all-time for the Wildcats.

In 2002, she was an AVCA Second Team All-American and the National Freshman of the Year. In 2003, she was a Third Team All-American. As a senior in 2005, Glass was selected AVCA All-America First-Team in leading Arizona to a fourth overall seed in the NCAA tournament, where they got to the regional final.

Kim Glass became the first Wildcat and the fourth player in Pac-10 history to record 2,000 kills.

== International career ==
=== Junior international competition ===
Glass is no stranger to international competition as she was a member of the U.S. women's junior national team that competed in the 2001 FIVB World Junior Championships. She also participated on the U.S. women's junior national team at the 2002 NORCECA Continental Women's Junior Championships.

=== Major international competition ===
2008

- Olympic Games
- U.S. Olympic team exhibition with Brazil
- FIVB World Grand Prix (fourth place)

2007

- FIVB World Grand Prix (eighth place)
- FIVB World Cup (bronze medal)

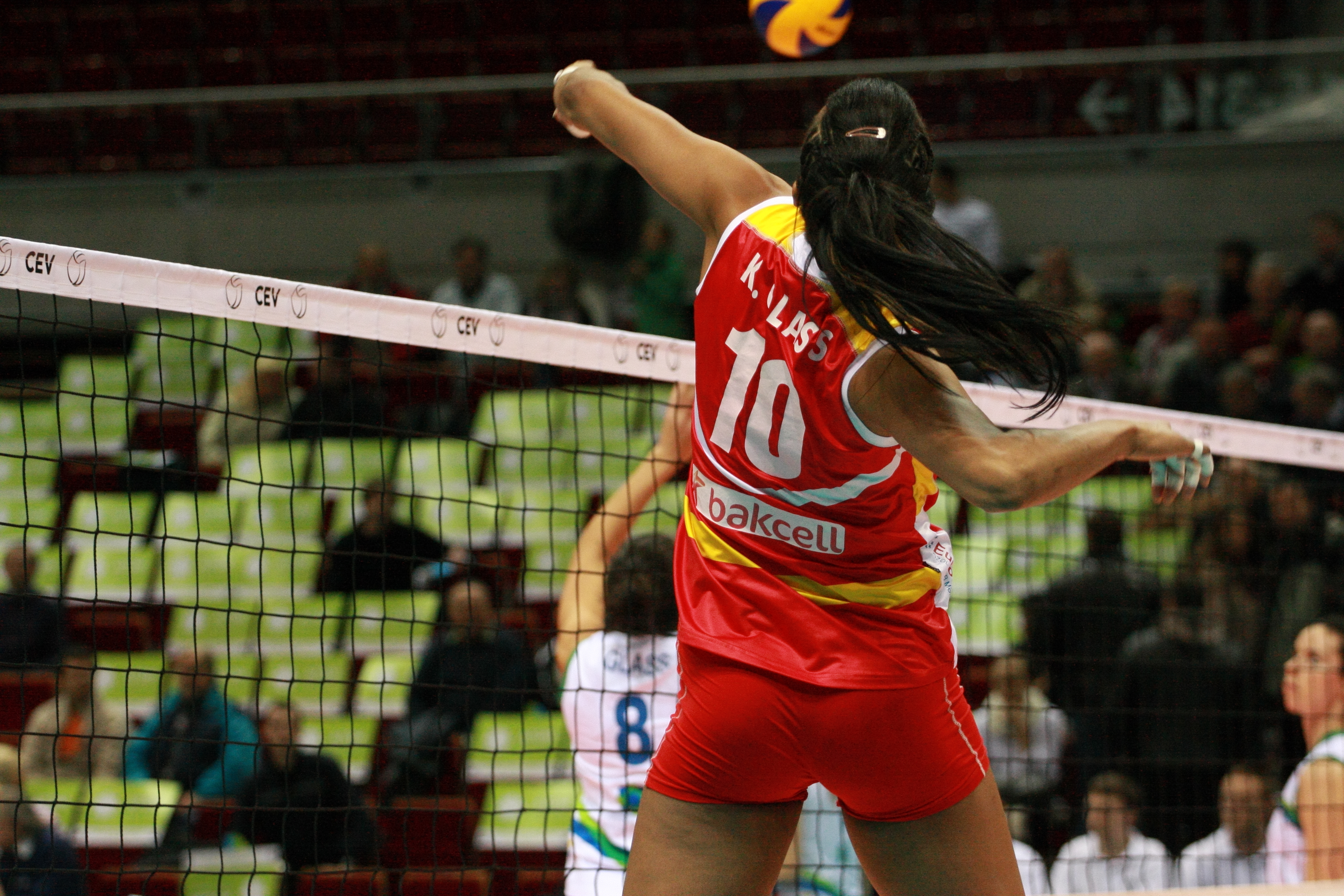
Kimberly Glass at 2012

=== International highlights ===
Averaged 3.39 points per set at the FIVB World Grand Prix in her first international experience with the U.S. women's national team. Ranked 10th among all scorers at the World Grand Prix during the preliminary round. Attacked at a 0.346 percentage with 2.61 kills per set on 211 swings. Averaged 0.97 digs, 0.39 aces and 0.39 blocks during the World Grand Prix. Started only four of 11 matches at the FIVB World Cup, but played in 29 sets with 26 set starts. Tallied World Cup per set averages of 2.45 points, 1.79 kills, 0.34 blocks, 1.21 digs and 0.31 aces. Contributed 12 points coming off the bench versus Cuba on November 3 with 9 kills on 16 swings. She scored 11 points against Thailand on November 10 and Japan on November 15.

== Professional career ==
Glass played for Pinkin de Corozal in Puerto Rico's Super League. She led the league in kills during the regular season and led her team to the tournament semifinals. She joined Fenerbahçe Women's Volleyball Team on 2007 season start with her U.S. national team-mate Therese Crawford. U.S. national libero Nicole Davis also played there on 2006–07 season.

== Awards ==
2005 NIRSA Region 6 Basketball Tournament Most Valuable Player

=== Clubs ===
- 2010/11 CEV Champions League – Runner-up, with Rabita Baku

== Other ventures ==
Glass competed on the special for the MTV reality series The Challenge: Champs vs. Stars, which premiered November 21, 2017. Glass almost made it to the Final Challenge, but lost a coin toss for the final spot.

Glass is now featured in a segment of the mobile phone app, Headspace, hosting a series of guided sessions focused on movement and mindfulness.
