= 2011 FIVB Volleyball Women's Club World Championship =

2011 Women's Club World Championship
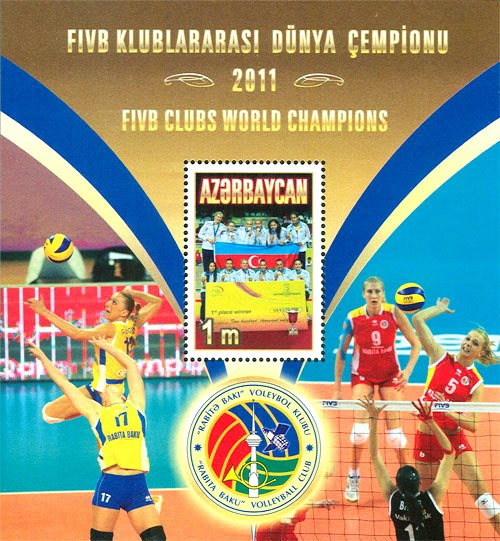
- Champions on a 2011 stamp sheet of Azerbaijan

Tournament details
- Host country: Qatar
- Dates: October 8 – 14
- Teams: 6
- Venue: 1 (in 1 host city)

Final positions
- Champions: (Azerbaijan) Rabita Baku (1st title)

Tournament awards
- MVP: (Croatia) Nataša Osmokrović (Rabita Baku)

The 2011 FIVB Women's Club World Championship was the fifth edition of the event. It was held in Doha, Qatar from October 8 to 14, 2011.

== Qualification ==
Team	Qualified as
Kenya Prisons	2011 African Champions
(Thailand) Chang Bangkok	2011 Asian Champions
(Dominican Republic) Mirador Santo Domingo	2011 NORCECA Representatives
(Brazil) Sollys Nestlé Osasco	2011 South American Champions
(Turkey) VakıfBank Ttelekom Istanbul	2011 European Champions
(Azerbaijan) Rabita Baku	Wild Card (2011 European Runners Up)

== Pools composition ==
Pool A	Pool B
(Turkey) VakıfBank Ttelekom Istanbul; Kenya Prisons (Dominican Republic) Mirador Santo Domingo	(Azerbaijan) Rabita Baku (Brazil) Sollys Nestlé Osasco (Thailand) Chang Bangkok

== Venue ==
All matches
(Qatar) Doha
Aspire Dome
Capacity: 15,000

== Pool standing procedure ==
Match won 3–0 or 3–1: 3 points for the winner, 0 points for the loser
Match won 3–2: 2 points for the winner, 1 point for the loser
In case of tie, the teams will be classified according to the following criteria:
number of matches won, sets ratio and points ratio

== Preliminary round ==
- All times are Arabia Standard Time (UTC+3).

=== Pool A ===
Pos	Team	Pld	W	L	Pts	SW	SL	SR	SPW	SPL	SPR	Qualification
1	(Turkey) VakıfBank Ttelekom Istanbul	2	2	0	6	6	0	MAX	150	86	1.744	Semifinals
2	(Dominican Republic) Mirador Santo Domingo	2	1	1	2	3	5	0.600	152	176	0.864	Semifinals
3	Kenya Prisons	2	0	2	1	2	6	0.333	141	181	0.779	

Date	Time		Score		Set 1	Set 2	Set 3	Set 4	Set 5	Total	Report
Oct 08	15:00	VakıfBank Ttelekom Istanbul (Turkey)	3–0	(Dominican Republic) Mirador Santo Domingo	25–13	25–19	25–14			75–46	P2 P3
Oct 10	10:00	Kenya Prisons	2–3	(Dominican Republic) Mirador Santo Domingo	25–20	25–20	20–25	24–26	7–15	101–106	P2 P3
Oct 12	17:00	VakıfBank Ttelekom Istanbul (Turkey)	3–0	Kenya Prisons	25–13	25–17	25–10			75–40	P2 P3

=== Pool B ===
Pos	Team	Pld	W	L	Pts	SW	SL	SR	SPW	SPL	SPR	Qualification
1	(Azerbaijan) Rabita Baku	2	2	0	5	6	3	2.000	207	162	1.278	Semifinals
2	(Brazil) Sollys Nestlé Osasco	2	1	1	4	5	4	1.250	186	199	0.935	Semifinals
3	(Thailand) Chang Bangkok	2	0	2	0	2	6	0.333	164	196	0.837	

Date	Time		Score		Set 1	Set 2	Set 3	Set 4	Set 5	Total	Report
Oct 09	10:00	Sollys Nestlé Osasco (Brazil)	3–1	(Thailand) Chang Bangkok	25–17	25–21	24–26	26–24		100–88	P2 P3
Oct 11	15:00	Rabita Baku (Azerbaijan)	3–1	(Thailand) Chang Bangkok	25–19	21–25	25–15	25–17		96–76	P2 P3
Oct 12	15:00	Sollys Nestlé Osasco (Brazil)	2–3	(Azerbaijan) Rabita Baku	12–25	25–23	18–25	25–23	6–15	86–111	P2 P3

== Final round ==
- All times are Arabia Standard Time (UTC+3).

=== Bracket ===
Semifinals
October 13 – Doha
(Turkey) VakıfBank Ttelekom Istanbul	3
(Brazil) Sollys Nestlé Osasco	0
October 13 – Doha
(Azerbaijan) Rabita Baku	3
(Dominican Republic) Mirador Santo Domingo	0

Final
October 14 – Doha
(Turkey) VakıfBank Ttelekom Istanbul	0
(Azerbaijan) Rabita Baku	3
3rd place
October 14 – Doha
(Brazil) Sollys Nestlé Osasco	3
(Dominican Republic) Mirador Santo Domingo	0

=== Semifinals ===
Date	Time		Score		Set 1	Set 2	Set 3	Set 4	Set 5	Total	Report
Oct 13	10:00	VakıfBank Ttelekom Istanbul (Turkey)	3–0	(Brazil) Sollys Nestlé Osasco	25–19	25–21	25–19			75–59	P2 P3
Oct 13	17:00	Rabita Baku (Azerbaijan)	3–0	(Dominican Republic) Mirador Santo Domingo	25–15	25–15	25–8			75–38	P2 P3

=== 3rd place ===
Date	Time		Score		Set 1	Set 2	Set 3	Set 4	Set 5	Total	Report
Oct 14	10:00	Sollys Nestlé Osasco (Brazil)	3–0	(Dominican Republic) Mirador Santo Domingo	25–9	25–13	25–8			75–30	P2 P3

=== Final ===
Date	Time		Score		Set 1	Set 2	Set 3	Set 4	Set 5	Total	Report
Oct 14	17:00	VakıfBank Ttelekom Istanbul (Turkey)	0–3	(Azerbaijan) Rabita Baku	15–25	18–25	9–25			42–75	P2 P3

== Final standing ==
Rank	Team
1st place, gold medalist(s)	(Azerbaijan) Rabita Baku
2nd place, silver medalist(s)	(Turkey) VakıfBank Istanbul
3rd place, bronze medalist(s)	(Brazil) Sollys Nestlé Osasco
4	(Dominican Republic) Mirador Santo Domingo
5	(Thailand) Chang Bangkok
5	Kenya Prisons

2011 Women's Club World Champions

1st title

Team roster
Rabadzhieva, Aliyeva, Krsmanović, Majstorović, Popović, Mammadova (c), Pelin, Golubović, Osmokrović, Radzuweit, Starović, Zhukova
Head coach
Gajić

== Awards ==
- MVP: (Croatia) Nataša Osmokrović (Rabita Baku)
- Best scorer: (Croatia) Nataša Osmokrović (Rabita Baku)
- Best spiker: (Croatia) Nataša Osmokrović (Rabita Baku)
- Best blocker: (Brazil) Adenízia da Silva (Sollys Nestlé Osasco)
- Best server: (Turkey) Bahar Toksoy (VakıfBank Ttelekom Istanbul)
- Best setter: (Ukraine) Iryna Zhukova (Rabita Baku)
- Best receiver: (Croatia) Nataša Osmokrović (Rabita Baku)
- Best libero: (Turkey) Gizem Güreşen (VakıfBank Ttelekom Istanbul)
