= Nataša Osmokrović =

Croatian volleyball player

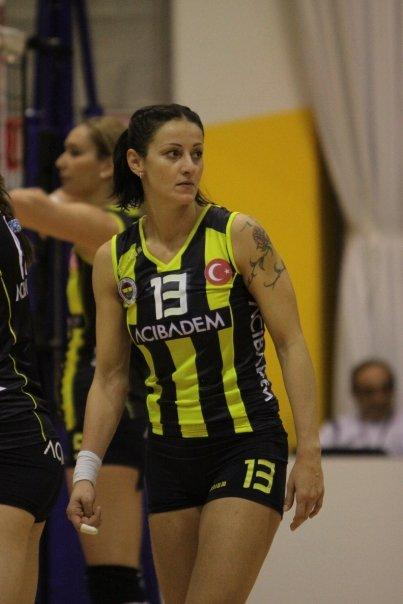

Personal information
- Full name: Nataša Osmokrović
- Nationality: Croatian
- Born: May 27, 1976 (age 50); Zagreb, SR Croatia, SFR Yugoslavia
- Hometown: Zagreb
- Height: 1.84 m (6 ft 1/2 in)
- Weight: 69 kg (152 lb)
- Spike: 328 cm (129 in)
- Block: 318 cm (125 in)

Volleyball information
- Position: Outside hitter
- Current club: Volero Zurich
- Number: 13

National team
1995 - 2001	Croatia
Honours
Women's volleyball
Representing Croatia
European Championship
Silver medal – second place	1995 Netherlands	Team
Silver medal – second place	1997 Czech Republic	Team
Silver medal – second place	1999 Italy	Team
- Last updated: April 2010

Nataša Osmokrović, born 27 May 1976 in Zagreb, Yugoslavia) is an international Croatian volleyball player who played with Croatia at the 2000 Summer Olympics.

== Personal life ==
Natasa has a son named Markus and currently lives in Moscow.

== Career ==
Osmokrović, then Nataša Leto, played with her national team in the 2000 Summer Olympics, helping them to reach the quarterfinals rounds and finishing in seventh place. She won the bronze medal at the 2007–08 CEV Indesit Champions League with Asystel Novara and also was individually awarded "Best receiver". She also won the 2009 CEV Cup with Novara. She signed a two-year contract with the Turkish team Fenerbahçe Acibadem in 2009. With this team she was awarded "Best server" at the CEV Indesit Champions League Final Four 2010 and win the Turkish League Championship. She also won the 2010 Clubs World Championship crown and the bronze medal in the 2011 CEV Championsleague with Fenerbahçe.

Osmokrović win the 2011 FIVB Women's Club World Championship playing in Doha, Qatar with Rabita Baku. She were also named Most Valuable Player, Best Scorer, Best Spiker and Best Receiver.

== Clubs ==
- (Croatia) Mladost Zagreb (1995–1996)
- (Japan) Hisamitsu Springs (1996–1997)
- (Japan) Ito Yokado (1997–1998)
- (Brazil) BCN/Osasco (1998–1999)
- (Italy) Er Volley Napoli (1999–2000)
- (Brazil) Vasco da Gama (2000–2001)
- (Italy) Caffè Sesso Reggio Calabria (2001–2002)
- (Italy) Asystel Novara (2001–2002)
- (Italy) Pallavolo Chieri (2003–2004)
- (Italy) Terra Sarda Tortolì (2004–2005)
- (Italy) Sant'Orsola Asystel Novara (2005–2007)
- (Italy) Asystel Novara (2007–2009)
- (Turkey) Fenerbahçe Acıbadem (2009–2011)
- (Azerbaijan) Rabita Baku (2011–2012)
- (Russia) WVC Dynamo Moscow (2012–2013)
- (Switzerland) Volero Zurich (2013–2014)

== Awards ==
=== Individuals ===
- 2007–08 CEV Indesit Champions League Final Four "Best receiver"
- 2009–10 CEV Indesit Champions League Final Four "Best server"
- 2011 FIVB Women's Club World Championship "Most valuable player"
- 2011 FIVB Women's Club World Championship "Best scorer"
- 2011 FIVB Women's Club World Championship "Best spiker"
- 2011 FIVB Women's Club World Championship "Best receiver"

=== Clubs ===
- 2001 Brazilian Superliga: Runner-Up, with Vasco da Gama
- 2005 Italian Super Cup - Champion, with Sant'Orsola Asystel Novara
- 2006 Top Teams Cup - Champion, with Sant'Orsola Asystel Novara
- 2007 Italian Cup - Champion, with Asystel Novara
- 2009 CEV Cup - Champion, with Asystel Novara
- 2010 Women's CEV Champions League - Runner-Up, with Fenerbahçe Acıbadem
- 2009-10 Turkish Championship - Champion, with Fenerbahçe Acıbadem
- 2009-10 Turkish Cup - Champion, with Fenerbahçe Acıbadem
- 2010 Turkish Super Cup - Champion, with Fenerbahçe Acıbadem
- 2010 FIVB World Club Championship - Champion, with Fenerbahçe Acıbadem
- 2010-11 CEV Champions League - Bronze medal, with Fenerbahçe Acıbadem
- 2010-11 Aroma Women's Volleyball League - Champion, with Fenerbahçe Acıbadem
- 2011 FIVB Women's Club World Championship - Champion, with Rabita Baku
- 2011-12 Azerbaijan League - Champion, with Rabita Baku
