= Silvija Popović =

Serbian volleyball player

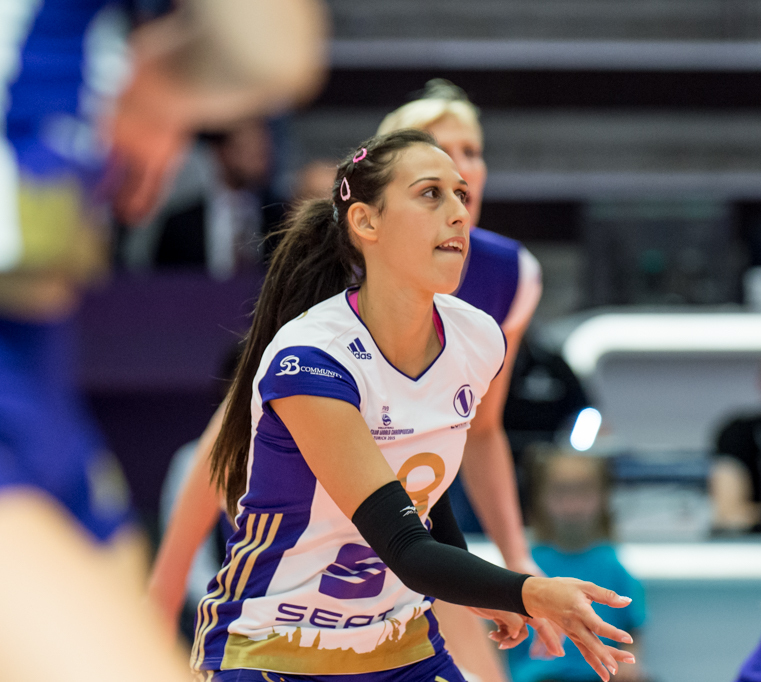
- Popović playing for Voléro Zürich at the 2015 Club World Championship.

Personal information
- Nationality: Serbian
- Born: 15 March 1986 (age 40); Nikšić, SR Montenegro, SFR Yugoslavia
- Height: 1.78 m (5 ft 10 in)
- Weight: 65 kg (143 lb)
- Spike: 286 cm (113 in)
- Block: 276 cm (109 in)

Volleyball information
- Position: Libero
- Current club: CSM Lugoj
- Number: 8

Career
Years	Teams
2006–2009; 2009–2012; 2013–2018; 2018–2019; 2019–2021; 2021–2024; 2025-	Poštar 064 Belgrade; Rabita Baku; Voléro Zürich; Altay VC; CSM Volei Alba Blaj; CSM Lugoj; ŽOK Luka Bar

National team
2009–2021, 2024	Serbia
Honours
Women's volleyball
Representing Serbia
Olympic Games
Silver medal – second place	2016 Rio de Janeiro	Team
Bronze medal – third place	2020 Tokyo	Team
World Championship
Gold medal – first place	2018 Japan	Team
European Championships
Gold medal – first place	2011 Serbia/Italy
Gold medal – first place	2019 Turkey
Silver medal – second place	2021 Serbia/Croatia/Bulgaria/Romania
Bronze medal – third place	2015 Netherlands/Belgium
World Cup
Silver medal – second place	2015 Japan
FIVB World Grand Prix
Bronze medal – third place	2011 Macau
Bronze medal – third place	2013 Sapporo
European Games
Bronze medal – third place	2015 Baku	Team
European League
Gold medal – first place	2011 Istanbul
Universiade
Silver medal – second place	2009 Belgrade	Team

Silvija Popović (Serbian: Силвија Поповић; born 13 March 1986) is a Serbian female professional volleyball player, who was a member of the Serbia women's national volleyball team that won the gold medal at both the 2011 European Championship and the 2018 World Championship.

== Career ==
With her club Rabita Baku Popović won the 2011 FIVB Volleyball Women's Club World Championship.

Popović won the bronze medal at the 2015 FIVB Club World Championship, playing with the Swiss club Voléro Zürich. She also won the tournament's Best Libero award.

== Clubs ==
- (Serbia) Poštar 064 Belgrade (2006–2009)
- (Azerbaijan) Rabita Baku (2009–2012)
- (Switzerland) Voléro Zürich (2013–2018)
- (Kazakhstan) Altay VC (2018-present)

== Awards ==
=== Individual ===
- 2009–10 CEV Cup Final Four "Best libero"
- 2015 FIVB Club World Championship "Best Libero"
- 2017 FIVB Club World Championship "Best Libero"
- 2018 FIVB Volleyball World Championship - European Qualification in Poland "Best Libero"

=== Clubs ===
- 2011 FIVB Club World Championship - Champion, with Rabita Baku
- 2015 FIVB Club World Championship - Bronze medal, with Voléro Zürich
- 2017 FIVB Club World Championship - Bronze medal, with Voléro Zürich

Awards
Preceded by (Russia) Ekaterina Ulanova (Brazil) Fabiana de Oliveira	Best Libero of FIVB Club World Championship; 2015; 2017	Succeeded by (Brazil) Fabiana de Oliveira (Turkey) Hatice Gizem Örge
