= Gizem Güreşen =

Turkish volleyball player

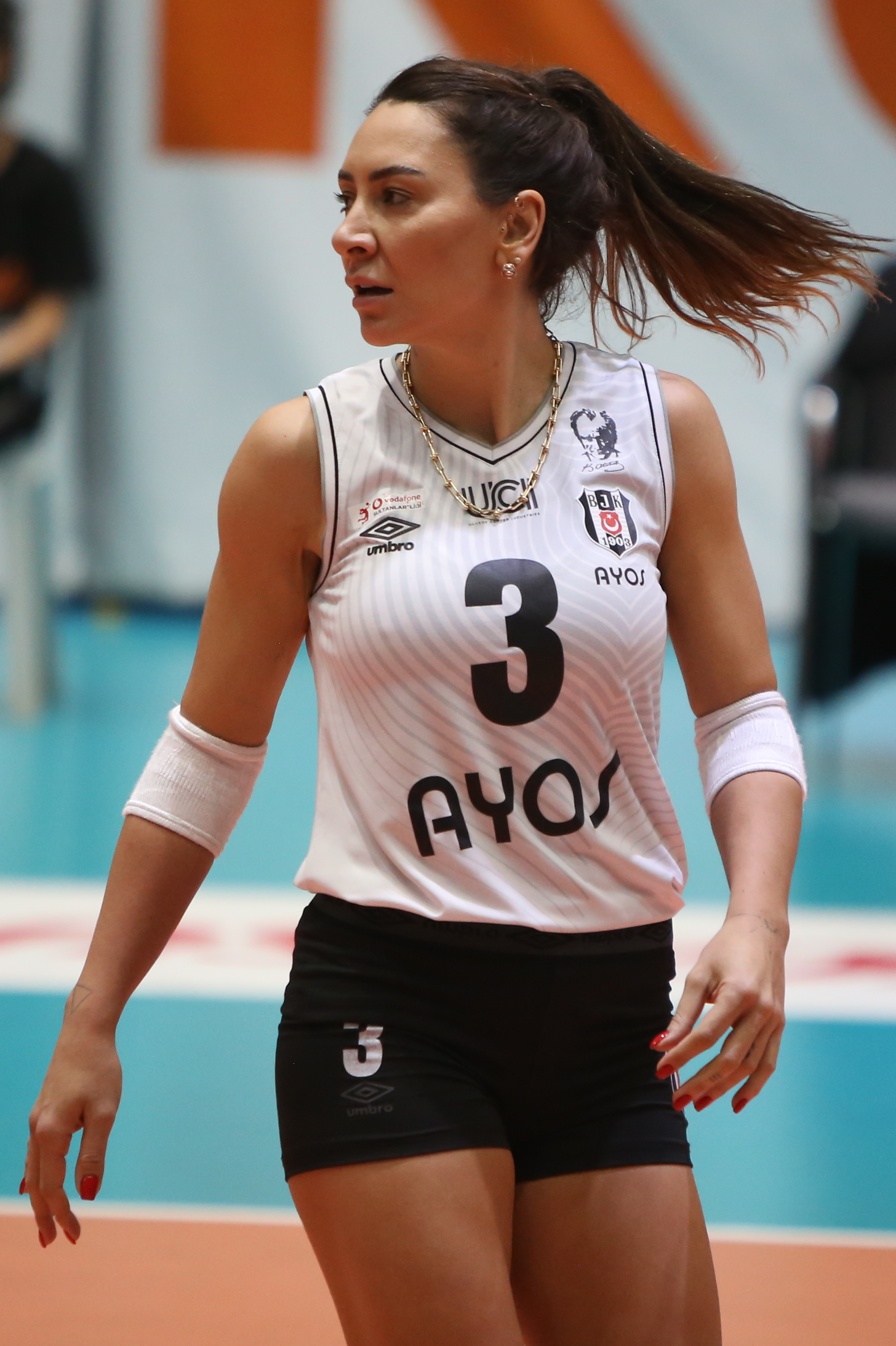

Personal information
- Nationality: Turkish
- Born: 14 January 1987 (age 39); Ankara, Turkey
- Height: 1.78 m (5 ft 10 in)
- Weight: 60 kg (130 lb)
- Spike: 290 cm (110 in)
- Block: 285 cm (112 in)

Volleyball information
- Position: Libero
- Current club: Beşiktaş Ceylan

Career
Years	Teams
2000–2004; 2005–2007; 2007–2008; 2008–2009; 2009–2015; 2015–2016; 2016–2017; 2017; 2017–2023; 2023–	VakıfBank; Türk Telekom Ankara; Marmaris Belediyespor; Galatasaray; VakıfBank; Fenerbahçe Grundig; Volero Zurich; Bursa Büyükşehir Belediyespor; Galatasaray; Beşiktaş Ceylan

National team
2009–2016	Turkey
Medal record
Women's volleyball
Representing Turkey
World Grand Prix
Bronze medal – third place	2012 Ningbo	Team
European Championships
Bronze medal – third place	2011 Italy-Serbia	Team
European League
Silver medal – second place	2011 Istanbul	Team
Bronze medal – third place	2010 Ankara	Team
European Games
Gold medal – first place	2015 Baku	Team
Mediterranean Games
Silver medal – second place	2009 Pescara	Team
Silver medal – second place	2013 Mersin	Team
- Last updated: 13 October 2013

Gizem Güreşen (born 14 January 1987) is a Turkish volleyball player. She is 1.76 m (5 ft 9 1/2 in) tall and plays as libero.

== Club career ==
She started volleyball in Ankara. She was trained in the infrastructure of VakıfBank Güneş Sigorta.

=== VakıfBank ===
Gizem Güreşen won the 2010–11 CEV Champions League with her team VakıfBank, and won the "Best Receiver" award.

Güreşen won the silver medal in the 2011 FIVB Women's Club World Championship playing in Doha, Qatar with VakıfBank. She was also awarded Best Libero.

Güreşen won the gold medal at the 2013 Club World Championship playing with Vakıfbank Istanbul.

=== Fenerbahçe ===
She was transferred to Fenerbahçe Grundig in the 2015–16 season.

=== Volero Zurich ===
In the 2016–17 season, she was transferred to Volero Zurich, a Swiss team. Gizem will play abroad for the first time.

=== Bursa Büyükşehir Belediyespor ===
She was transferred to Bursa Büyükşehir Belediyespor in the 2017–18 season.

=== Galatasaray (return) ===
On 6 December 2017, Galatasaray signed a 1.5-year contract with Güreşen at the signing ceremony held at the Ali Sami Yen Sports Complex Türk Telekom Stadium.

In the official statement made on 19 April 2021, Galatasaray HDI Sigorta Women's Volleyball Team signed a new 2-year contract with team captain Güreşen.

On 21 March 2023, the contract between Galatasaray HDI Sigorta and Güreşen was mutually terminated.

== National team career ==
Güreşen won the Best Libero award and the silver medal at the 2011 European League, playing with her national team.

== Personal life ==
On 12 May 2013 Gizem Güreşen married Hüseyin Karadayı, a well-known disc jockey in Turkey. They divorced in 2020.

== Awards ==
=== Individuals ===
- 2010–11 CEV Champions League Final Four "Best Libero"
- 2010-11 Aroma Women's Volleyball League "Best Libero"
- 2010-11 Aroma Women's Volleyball League "Best Receiver"
- 2011 European League "Best Libero"
- 2011 FIVB Women's Club World Championship "Best Libero"
- 2012-13 CEV Champions League "Best Libero"

=== National team ===
- 2009 Mediterranean Games - Silver Medal
- 2010 European League - Bronze Medal
- 2011 European League - Silver Medal
- 2011 Women's European Volleyball Championship - Bronze Medal
- 2012 FIVB World Grand Prix - Bronze Medal
- 2013 Mediterranean Games - Silver Medal

=== Clubs ===
- 2010-11 CEV Champions League - Champion, with VakıfBank
- 2011 FIVB Women's Club World Championship - Runner-Up, with VakıfBank
- 2011-12 Aroma Women's Volleyball League - Runner-Up, with VakıfBank
- 2012-13 Turkish Cup - Champion, with VakıfBank
- 2012–13 CEV Champions League - Champion, with VakıfBank
- 2012-13 Turkish Women's Volleyball League - Champion, with Vakıfbank Spor Kulübü
- 2013 Club World Championship - Champion, with Vakıfbank Istanbul
- 2013-15 Turkish Super Cup - Champion, with Fenerbahçe Grundig

Awards
Preceded by (Italy) Paola Cardullo	Best Libero of CEV Women's Champions League; 2012-13	Succeeded by TBD
Preceded by (Dominican Republic) Brenda Castillo	Best Libero of FIVB Women's Club World Championship; 2011	Succeeded by (Brazil) Camila Brait
Preceded by (Bulgaria) Mariya Filipova	Best Libero of Women's European Volleyball League; 2011	Succeeded by (Czech Republic) Julie Jasova
Preceded by (Italy) Enrica Merlo	Best Libero of CEV Women's Champions League; 2010-11	Succeeded by (Italy) Paola Cardullo
