= Jelena Nikolić =

Serbian volleyball player

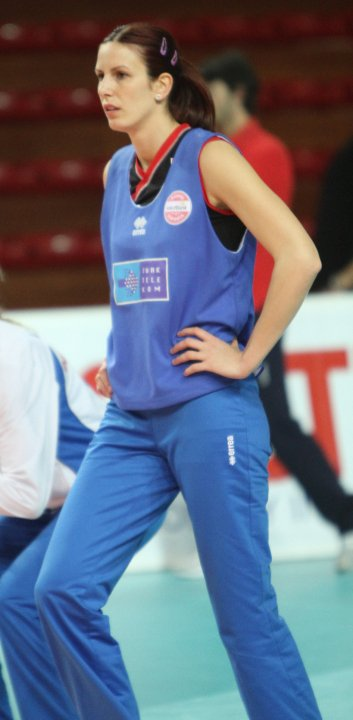

Personal information
- Nationality: Serbian
- Born: 13 April 1982 (age 44); Belgrade, SR Serbia, SFR Yugoslavia
- Height: 1.92 m (6 ft 4 in)
- Weight: 75 kg (165 lb)
- Spike: 315 cm (124 in)
- Block: 300 cm (118 in)

Volleyball information
- Position: Wing Spiker
- Current club: VakıfBank Güneş Sigorta Türk Telekom
- Number: 12

Career
| Years | Teams |
|---|---|
| 1997–1999; 1999–2002; 2002–2003; 2003–2004; 2004–2005; 2005–2006; 2006–2007; 2007–2008; 2008–2014; 2014–2015; 2015–2016 | OK Obilić Belgrade; Reggio Emilia; Foppapedretti Bergamo; Minetti Infoplus Vincenza; RC Cannes; Toray Arrows; Megius Volley Padova; Takefuji Bamboo; VakıfBank Güneş Sigorta Istanbul; Azeryol Baku; Bursa BB |

National team
| 2006; 2007–2016 | Serbia and Montenegro; Serbia |
Honours
Volleyball
Olympic Games
| Silver medal – second place | 2016 Rio de Janeiro | Team |
World Championship
| Bronze medal – third place | 2006 Japan | Team |
European Championships
| Gold medal – first place | 2011 Serbia/Italy |
| Silver medal – second place | 2007 Belgium/Luxembourg |
| Bronze medal – third place | 2015 Netherlands/Belgium |
World Cup
| Silver medal – second place | 2015 Japan |
FIVB World Grand Prix
| Bronze medal – third place | 2011 Macau |
| Bronze medal – third place | 2013 Sapporo |
European Games
| Bronze medal – third place | 2015 Baku | Team |
European League
| Gold medal – first place | 2010 Turkey |
Universiade
| Silver medal – second place | 2009 Belgrade | Team |

Jelena Nikolić-Nenadiċ (Serbian Cyrillic: Јелена Николић; born 13 April 1982) is a retired Serbian professional volleyball player, playing as a wing-spiker. She was a member of the Women's National Team that won silver medal at the 2016 Olympics and gold medal at the 2011 European Championship in Serbia.

== Career ==
She played for VakıfBank Güneş Sigorta Türk Telekom in Turkey from 2008/2010. With this team Jelena win the 2010–11 CEV Champions League and also winning the "Best Scorer" award.

Nikolić won the gold medal at the 2013 Club World Championship playing with Vakıfbank Istanbul.

== Clubs ==
- (Federal Republic of Yugoslavia) OK Obilić Belgrade (1997–1999)
- (Italy) Reggio Emilia (1999–2002)
- (Italy) Foppapedretti Bergamo (2002–2003)
- (Italy) Minetti Infoplus Vincenza (2003–2004)
- (France) RC Cannes (2004–2005)
- (Japan) Toray Arrows (2005–2006)
- (Italy) Megius Volley Padova (2006–2007)
- (Japan) Takefuji Bamboo (2007–2008)
- (Turkey) VakıfBank Güneş Sigorta Istanbul (2008–2014)
- (Azerbaijan) Azeryol Baku (2014–2015)
- (Turkey) Bursa BB (2015–2016)
- (Italy) Metalleghe Montichiari (2016–2017)
- (Turkey) Türk Hava Yolları (2018–2019)

== Awards ==
=== Individual ===
- 2010 European Volleyball League "MVP"
- 2010 European Volleyball League "Best Receiver"
- 2010–11 CEV Champions League Final Four "Best Scorer"

=== National team ===
==== Senior team ====
- 2009 European League - Gold Medal
- 2010 European League - Gold Medal
- 2011 European League - Gold Medal

==== Universiade ====
- 2009 Summer Universiade - Silver Medal

=== Clubs ===
- 2004/2005 France Championship - Champion, with RC Cannes
- 2004/2005 France Cup - Champion, with RC Cannes
- 2009/2010 Turkish Championship - Runner-Up, with VakıfBank Güneş Sigorta Türk Telekom
- 2010/11 CEV Champions League - Champion, with VakıfBank Güneş Sigorta Türk Telekom
- 2011 FIVB Women's Club World Championship - Runner-Up, with VakıfBank Türk Telekom
- 2011-12 Aroma Women's Volleyball League - Runner-Up, with Vakıfbank Spor Kulübü
- 2013 Club World Championship - Champion, with Vakıfbank Istanbul
