= Pelin Çelik =

Turkish volleyball player

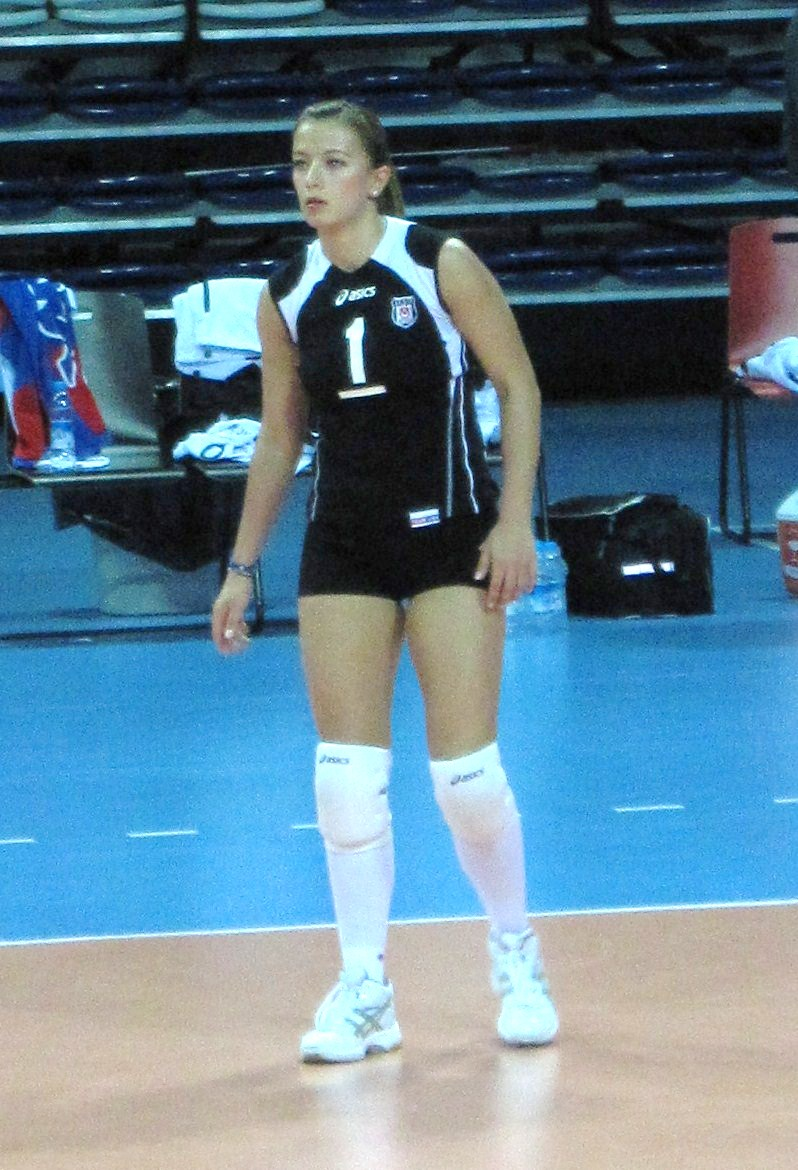

Personal information
- Born: 23 May 1982 (age 44); Istanbul, Turkey
- Height: 1.72 m (5 ft 8 in)

Volleyball information
- Position: Setter
- Current club: Sarıyer Belediyesi Women's Volleyball Team
- Number: 17

Career
Years	Teams
1997-2000; 2000-2001; 2001-2003; 2003-2006; 2006-2008; 2008-2009; 2009-2010; 2010-2011; 2011; 2011-	VakıfBank Ankara; VakıfBank Güneş Sigorta; Yeşilyurt; Türk Telekom; Fenerbahçe Acıbadem; DYO Karşıyaka; Ankaragücü; Beşiktaş; Rabita Baku; Azerrail Baku; Sarıyer Belediyesi

National team
2003-present	Turkey
Medal record
Women's volleyball
Representing Turkey
European Championship
Silver medal – second place	2003 Turkey	Team
Mediterranean Games
Silver medal – second place	2009 Pescara	Team

Pelin Çelik (born 23 May 1982) is a Turkish volleyball player. She is 172 cm and plays as setter for Azeri volleyball club Azerrail Baku. She studied at Istanbul Bilgi University.

She played 275 times for the national team. She also played for Fenerbahçe Acıbadem, Vakıfbank, Vakıfbank Güneş Sigorta and Yeşilyurt in Turkey and also played for Rabita Baku in Azerbaijan for four months contract.

Her father Hüseyin Çelik was a footballer and played for Gençlerbirliği, Adana Demirspor, Fenerbahçe and Mersin İdmanyurdu.

== Club career ==
- 1997-00 (Turkey) VakıfBank Ankara
  - The Champion Clubs Runners-up (2): 1997–98, 1998–99
  - Turkish League (1): 1997-98
  - Turkish Cup (1): 1997-98
- 2000-01 (Turkey) VakıfBank Güneş Sigorta
- 2001-03 (Turkey) Yeşilyurt
- 2003-06 (Turkey) Türk Telekom
- 2006-08 (Turkey) Fenerbahçe Acıbadem
  - Turkish League Runners-up (2): 2006–07, 2007–08
- 2008-09 (Turkey) DYO Karşıyaka
- 2009-10 (Turkey) Ankaragücü
- 2010-11 (Turkey) Beşiktaş
- 2011-12 (Azerbaijan) Rabita Baku
  - FIVB Volleyball Women's Club World Championship: 2011
- 2011-12 (Azerbaijan) Azerrail Baku

=== National team ===
- 2003-... Turkey
  - Women's European Volleyball Championship: 2003
  - Women's European Volleyball League 2009
  - 2009 European Volleyball League "Best Setter"

== See also ==
- Turkish women in sports

Awards
Preceded by new creation	Best Setter of Women's European Volleyball League; 2009	Succeeded by (Serbia) Maja Ognjenović
