= Bahar Mert =

Turkish volleyball player (born 1975)

Personal information
- Full name: Bahar Mert Üçoklar
- Born: 13 December 1975 (age 50); Kardzhali, Bulgaria
- Hometown: Ankara, Turkey
- Height: 1.80 m (5 ft 11 in)
- Weight: 61 kg (134 lb)
- Spike: 290 cm (114 in)
- Block: 286 cm (113 in)

Volleyball information
- Position: Setter
- Current team: Türk Telekom Ankara

National team
Turkey
Medal record
Women's volleyball
Representing Turkey
Mediterranean Games
Gold medal – first place	2005 Almeria	Team
- Last updated: 29 November 2008

Bahar Mert Üçoklar (born 13 December 1975) is a retired Turkish volleyball player. She is 180 cm and plays as setter.

She plays for Türk Telekom Ankara. She has been on the team since 2007 and wears the number 1. She is the team's captain. She was a member of the Women's National Team that won the silver medal at the 2003 European Championship in Ankara. She participated at the 2006 FIVB Women's World Championship.

== Clubs ==
- 1990-94 (Turkey) Eczacıbaşı Istanbul
- 1994-00 (Turkey) Vakıfbank Ankara
- 2000-01 (Germany) Volley Cats Berlin
- 2002-05 (Turkey) Eczacıbaşı Istanbul
- 2006-07 (Italy) Asystel Novara
- 2007-09 (Turkey) Türk Telekom Ankara

== Individual awards ==
- 1998/1999 Women's CEV Champions League "Best Setter"

== See also ==
- Turkish women in sports
