= Carmen Țurlea =

Romanian volleyball player (born 1975)

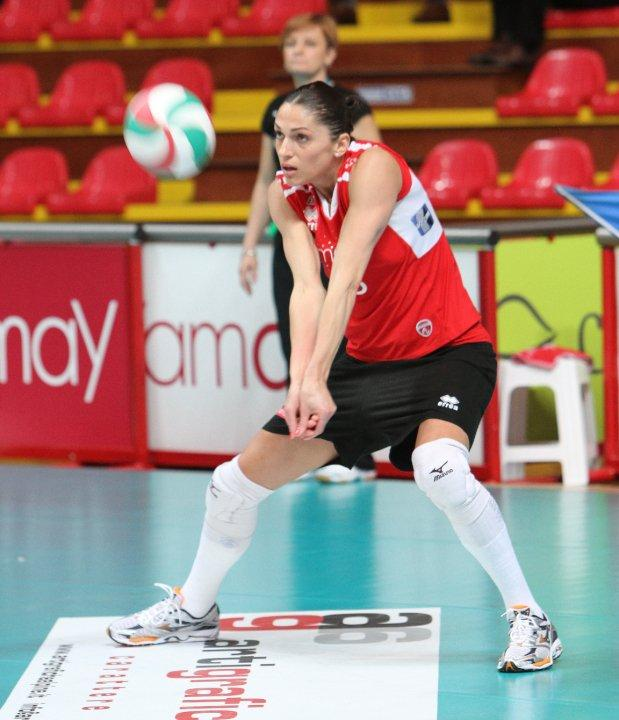

Personal information
- Nationality: Romanian
- Born: 18 November 1975 (age 50); Cisnadie
- Hometown: Constanta
- Height: 1.83 m (6 ft 0 in)
- Weight: 65 kg (143 lb)
- Spike: 306 cm (120 in)
- Block: 300 cm (118 in)

Volleyball information
- Position: opposite
- Current club: Pomi Casalmaggiore
- Number: 6

National team
2002	Romania

Carmen Țurlea (born 18 November 1975 Cisnadie) is a Romanian female volleyball player, who plays as an opposite.

She was part of the Romania women's national volleyball team at the 2002 FIVB Volleyball Women's World Championship in Germany. On club level she played with Foppapedretti Bergamo in 2003.

== Clubs ==
- Foppapedretti Bergamo (2002)
