= Bahar Toksoy =

Turkish volleyball player

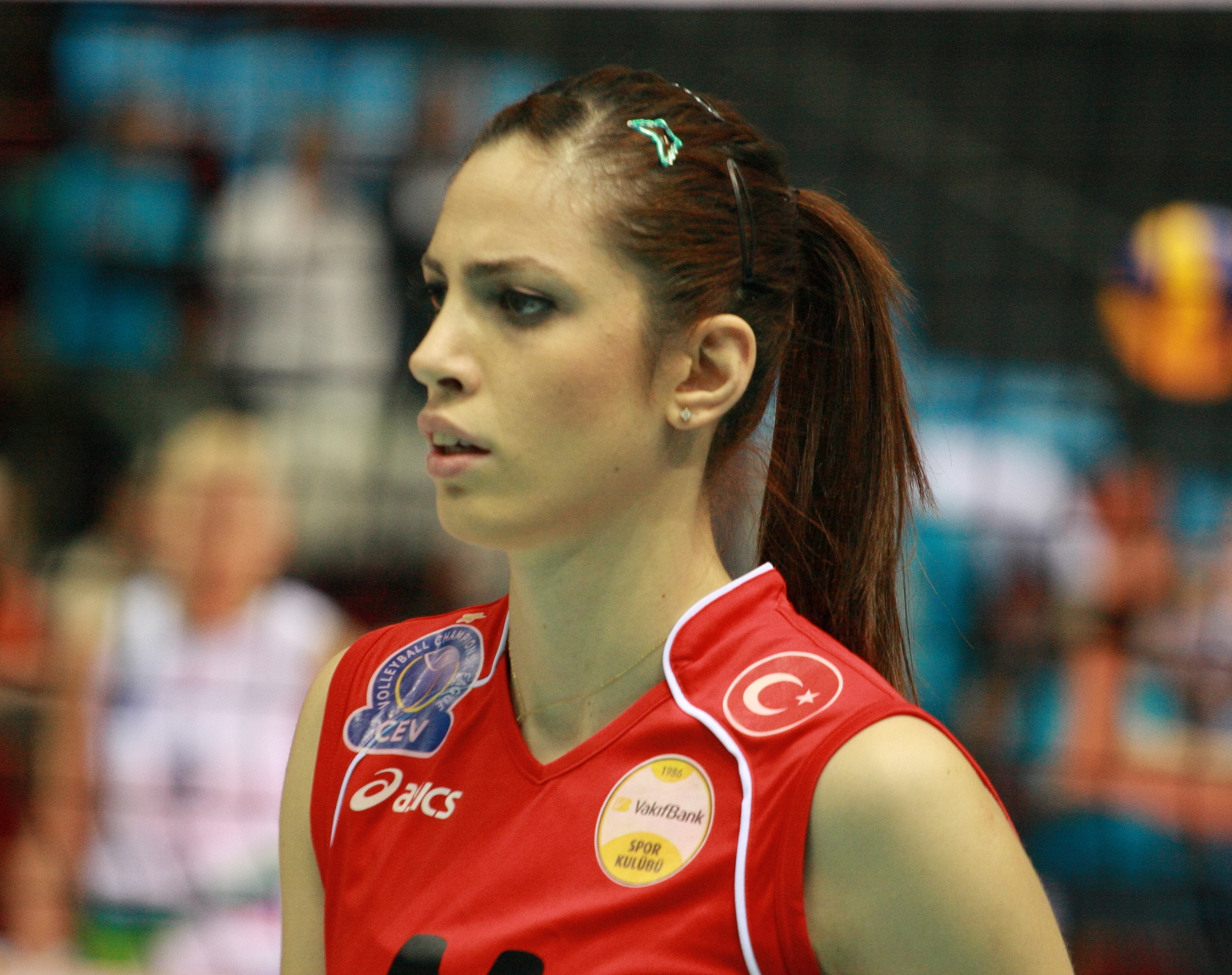

Personal information
- Full name: Bahar Toksoy Guidetti
- Nationality: Turkish
- Born: 6 February 1988 (age 38) İzmir, Turkey
- Height: 1.90 m (6 ft 3 in)
- Weight: 75 kg (165 lb)
- Spike: 316 cm (124 in)
- Block: 308 cm (121 in)

Volleyball information
- Position: Middle blocker
- Current club: Beşiktaş Ayos
- Number: 20

Career
- Years: Team
- 2002–2004 2004–2006 2007–2015 2015 2016 2017–21 2021–2023 2023–present: Karşıyaka; Yeşilyurt; VakıfBank; Savino del Bene Scandicci; Eczacıbaşı VitrA; Fenerbahçe; Türk Hava Yolları; Beşiktaş Ayos

National team
- Years: Team
- Turkey
Medal record
Women's volleyball
Representing Turkey
World Grand Prix
Bronze medal – third place	2012 Ningbo	Team
European Championships
Bronze medal – third place	2011 Italy/Serbia	Team
Bronze medal – third place	2017 Azerbaijan/Georgia	Team
European League
Bronze medal – third place	2010 Ankara	Team
Mediterranean Games
Silver medal – second place	2009 Pescara	Team
Silver medal – second place	2013 Mersin	Team

Bahar Toksoy Guidetti (born 6 February 1988) is a Turkish volleyball player. She plays as a middle blocker. In 2024 she currently plays for Beşiktaş Ayos. She plays for the Turkish national team.

== Career ==
=== Club career ===
With VakıfBank, she won the gold medal at the 2010/2011 CEV Champions League. They also finished second in their domestic league losing in the final to Fenerbahçe. Bahar won the silver medal at the 2011 FIVB Women's Club World Championship in Doha, Qatar with them and was awarded Best Server of the tournament. In 2011/2012 season, VakifBank did not advance to the Final Four of the CEV Champions League but they beat Fenerbahçe in the semifinal of the Turkish League before losing to Eczacıbaşı VitrA in the final. Toksoy won the gold medal at the 2013 Club World Championship playing with Vakıfbank Istanbul.

In 2015, she played for Italian volleyball team, Savino Del Bene Volley.

In 2016, she was transferred to Eczacıbaşı VitrA. On 20 January 2017 she signed a contract with Fenerbahçe until the end of the 2017–18 season. She stayed with them until 2021, and then moved to Türk Hava Yolları for two years; she then signed with Beşiktaş Ayos up to 2024.

=== National team ===
Bahar competed for Turkey at the 2008 World Grand Prix where they finished 7th and at the 2009 European Championship where they ended 5th. In 2010, she helped her team win the 6th place at the World Championship in Japan. In 2011 they lost to Serbia in the final of the European League and a few months later they also lost to Serbia in the semifinal of the European Championship but managed to beat Italy to win the bronze medal. She was this tournament's best server. 2012 was the best season so far for the Turkish National Team as they secured a spot at the 2012 Olympic Games in London.

== Personal life ==
Bahar was born in İzmir, Turkey. She recalls being interested in games involving balls. Her childhood consisted of fond memories of being sick too often. It was believed that sports made her immune system better. On 20 September 2013, she married Giovanni Guidetti, coach of her team Vakıfbank. They started a summer volleyball academy for girls.

== Awards ==
=== Individual ===
- 2011 FIVB World Grand Prix European Qualification "Best Blocker"
- 2010-11 CEV Champions League preliminaries "Best Blocker"
- 2011 European Championship "Best Server"
- 2011 FIVB Women's Club World Championship "Best Server"
- 2012-13 Turkish League Final Series "Best Blocker"

=== National team ===
- 2009 Mediterranean Games - Silver medal
- 2010 European League - Bronze medal
- 2011 European Championship - Bronze medal
- 2012 FIVB World Grand Prix - Bronze medal
- 2013 Mediterranean Games - Silver medal

=== Clubs ===
- 2007-08 Challenge Cup Champion, with VakıfBank Güneş Sigorta Türk Telekom
- 2010–11 CEV Champions League - Champion, with VakıfBank Güneş Sigorta Türk Telekom
- 2011 FIVB Women's Club World Championship - Runner-Up, with VakıfBank Türk Telekom
- 2011-12 Turkish Women's Volleyball League - Runner-Up, with Vakıfbank Spor Kulübü
- 2012-13 Turkish Cup - Champion, with Vakıfbank Spor Kulübü
- 2012–13 CEV Champions League - Champion, with Vakıfbank Spor Kulübü
- 2012-13 Turkish Women's Volleyball League - Champion, with Vakıfbank Spor Kulübü
- 2013 FIVB Women's Club World Championship - Champion, with Vakıfbank Spor Kulübü

== See also ==
- Turkish women in sports

Awards
Preceded by (Turkey) Eda Erdem Dündar	Best Server of FIVB Women's Club World Championship; 2011	Succeeded by (Germany) Angelina Grün-Hübner
Preceded by (Poland) Agnieszka Bednarek-Kasza	Best Server of Women's European Volleyball Championship; 2011	Succeeded by (Germany) Margareta Kozuch
