= Maja Poljak =

Croatian volleyball player (born 1983)

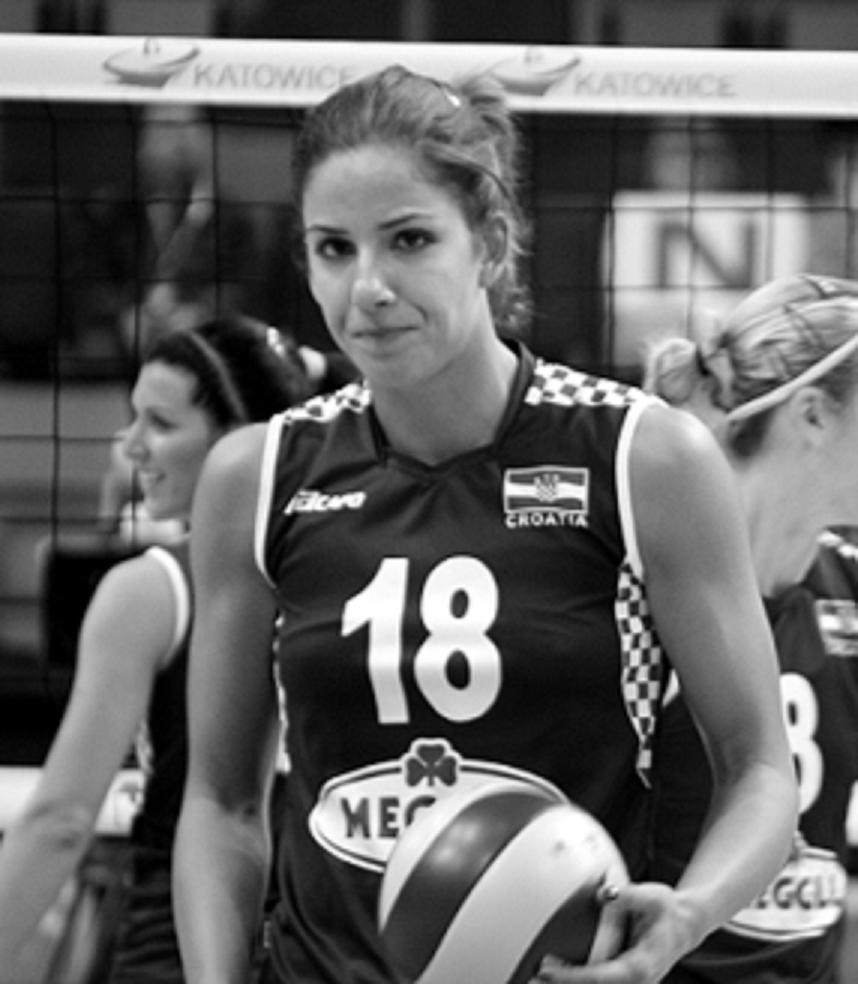

Personal information
- Born: 2 May 1983 (age 43); Split, SR Croatia, SFR Yugoslavia
- Hometown: Split, Croatia
- Height: 1.94 m (6 ft 4 in)
- Weight: 73 kg (161 lb)
- Spike: 312 cm (123 in)
- Block: 298 cm (117 in)

Volleyball information
- Position: Middle Blocker
- Current team: Dinamo Moscow
- Number: 18

National team
Croatia
Medal record
Women's volleyball
Representing Croatia
European Championship
Silver medal – second place	1999 Italy	Team
Mediterranean Games
Bronze medal – third place	2009 Pescara	Team
- Last updated: 13 November 2008

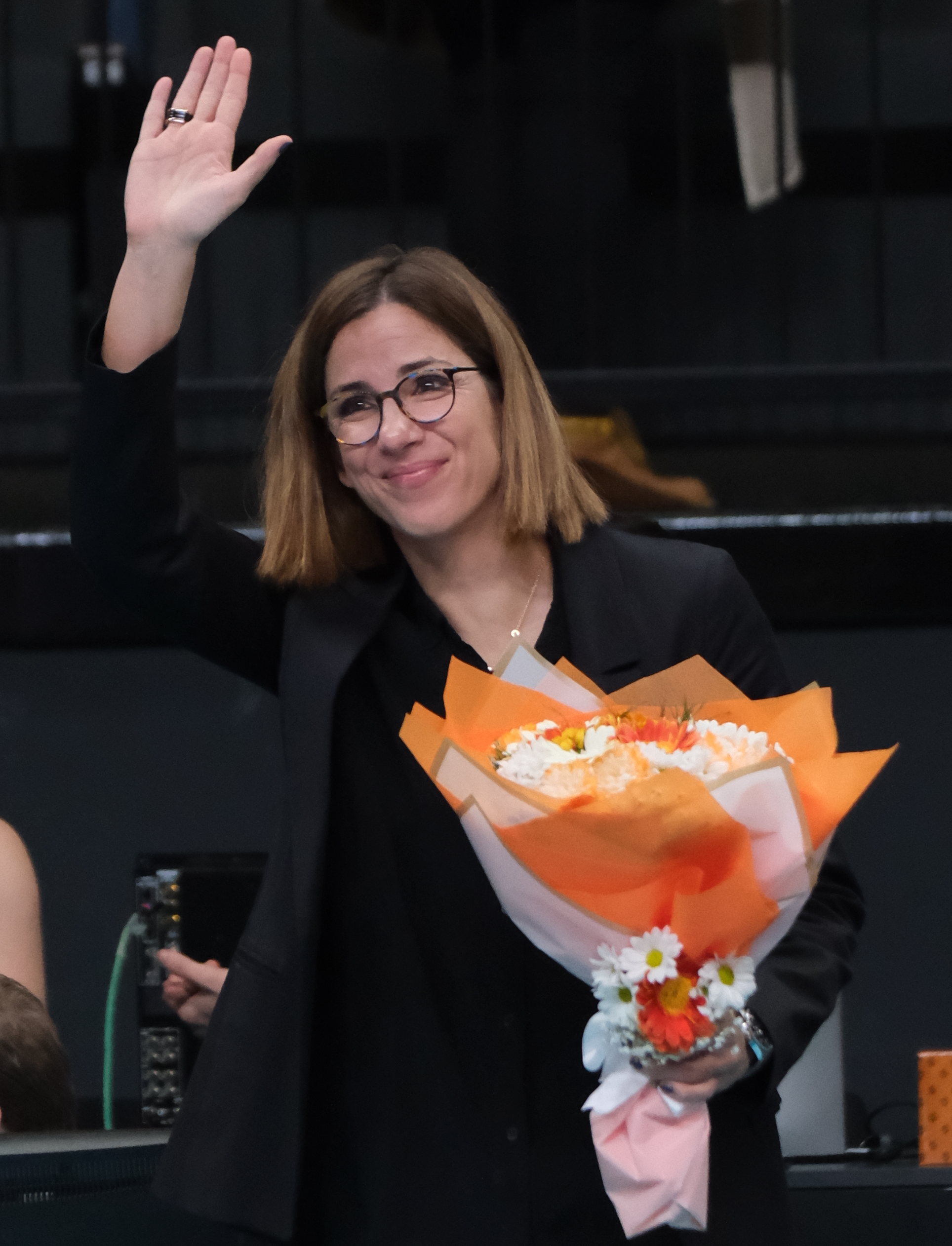
Poljak in 2026

Maja Poljak (born 2 May 1983) is a Croatian volleyball player. She plays as middle blocker for Dinamo Moscow. She was a member of the Women's National Team that won the silver medal at the 1999 European Championship in Italy.

== Career ==
Maja won the 2010–11 CEV Champions League with her team Vakifbank Istanbul, and won the "Best Blocker" award.

== Clubs ==
- (Croatia) Mladost Zagreb (1995-2000)
- (Italy) Minetti Vicenza (2000-2003)
- (Italy) Volley Bergamo (2003-2008)
- (Turkey) Türk Telekom Ankara (2008-2009)
- (Turkey) Vakifbank Istanbul (2009-2011)
- (Turkey) Eczacıbaşı VitrA (2011-2016)
- (Russia) Dinamo Moscow (2016-2017)

== Awards ==
=== Individuals ===
- 2004-05 Women's CEV Champions League "Best Blocker"
- 2005 CEV Champions League "Best Blocker"
- 2011 Turkish Championships "Best Blocker"
- 2010-11 CEV Champions League "Best Blocker"
- 2010–11 CEV Champions League Final Four "Best Blocker"
- 2014-15 CEV Champions League "Best Blocker"
- 2015 FIVB Women's Club World Championship "Best Middle Blocker"
- 2017 FIVB Women's Club World Championship "Best Middle Blocker"

=== Clubs ===
- 2004/05 CEV Champions League - Champion, with bergamo
- 2006/07 CEV Champions League - Champion, with bergamo
- 2010/11 CEV Champions League - Champion, with VakıfBank Güneş Sigorta Türk Telekom
- 2011 Turkish Volleyball Super Cup - Champion, with Eczacıbaşı VitrA
- 2011-12 Turkish Cup - Champion, with Eczacıbaşı VitrA
- 2011-12 Aroma Women's Volleyball League - Champion, with Eczacıbaşı VitrA
- 2012 Turkish Volleyball Super Cup - Champion, with Eczacıbaşı VitrA
- 2012-2013 Turkish Women's Volleyball Cup - Runner-Up, with Eczacıbaşı VitrA
- 2012-2013 Turkish Women's Volleyball League - Runner-Up, with Eczacıbaşı VitrA
- 2014–15 CEV Champions League - Champion, with Eczacıbaşı VitrA
- 2015 FIVB Club World Championship - Champion, with Eczacıbaşı VitrA
- 2016–17 Russian Championship - Champion, with Dinamo Moscow
