= Telekom Baku =

Azerbaijani women's volleyball club

- Full name: Telekom Bakı
- Founded: 2004; 22 years ago
- Dissolved: 2017; 9 years ago
- Ground: "Sarhadchi" Sports Olympic Center; Baku, Azerbaijan (Capacity: 2600)
- Manager: (Serbia) Zoran Gajić
- League: Azerbaijan Superleague
- 2016/17: 1st

Uniforms
Home	Away

Telekom Baku (formerly named Rabita Baku) was an Azerbaijani women's volleyball club. Telekom was an eight-time champion of Azerbaijani Superleague and the winner of the 2011 FIVB Club World Championship.

== History ==
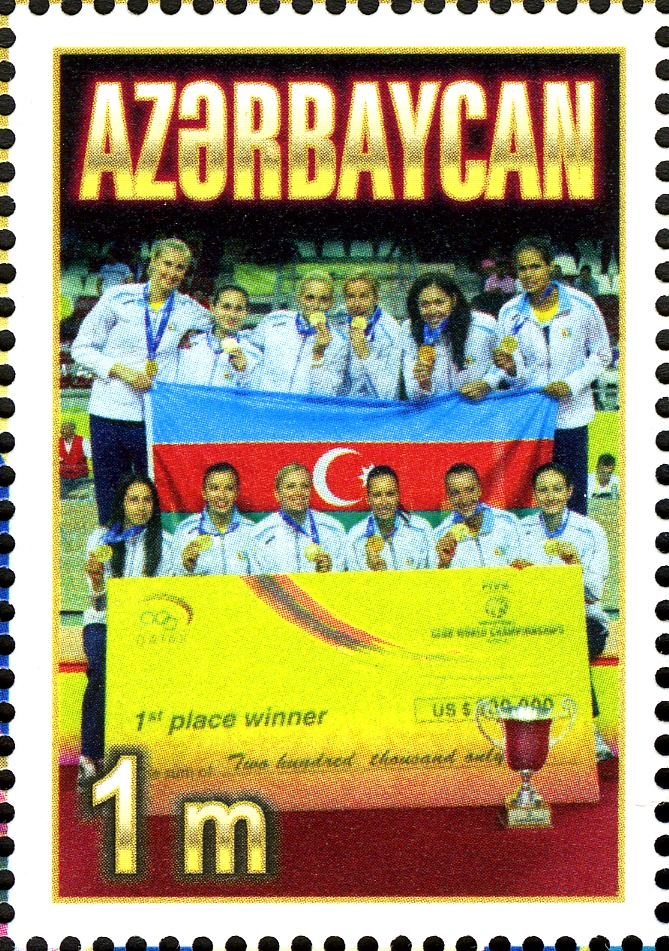
Stamp of Azerbaijan 2011 FIVB clubs world champions

The Rabita Bank was founded in 2001 as Rabitachi Baku, and then took Rabita Baku in 2004. Club participated for the first time in an official competition in the European CEV Cup 2007–08, but was eliminated immediately by OK Hit Nova Gorica.

In the season 2008–09, reaches the quarter-finals of the Challenge Cup and was eliminated from the Club Voleibol Albacete and wins for the first time the championship in the final against Azerrail. The season 2009-10 campaign starts with a good buy: the team wins the championship again and get the third place in the CEV Cup, losing in the semifinals against Futura Volley Busto Arsizio, but winning the final for bronze against VC Uralochka-NTMK Yekaterinburg.

In the season 2010 - 11, club participated for the first time in the Women's CEV Champions League and reached final of this competition, just losing to VakıfBank of Turkey.

Rabita hosted the 2013–14 CEV Champions League Final Four, there the club won the Bronze medal after falling 0–3 to the Russian Dinamo Kazan in the semifinals, but defeating 3–0 to the Turkish Eczacıbaşı VitrA Istanbul in the third place match.

After eight Azerbaijani Superleague titles, in 2015 Rabita Baku merged with Telekom Baku adopting the name of the latter, due to financial difficulties but retained the commitments in the Azerbaijani Superleague and the 2015–16 CEV Champions League and transferring to the new team the Telekom young players.

== Team ==
=== As Telekom Baku ===
Season 2016–2017, as of November 2016.

Number	Player	Position	Height (m)	Weight (kg)	Birth date
1	(Azerbaijan) Anastasiia Baidiuk	Outside hitter	1.89	67	5 December 1999 (age 26)
2	(Azerbaijan) Yana Azimova	Setter	1.74	63	5 July 1994 (age 32)
3	(Azerbaijan) Yelyzaveta Samadova	Outside hitter	1.85	72	3 March 1995 (age 31)
4	(Serbia) Aleksandra Petrović	Middle blocker	1.92	57	1 July 1987 (age 39)
5	(Azerbaijan) Marharyta Azizova	Opposite	1.86	73	25 April 1993 (age 33)
7	(Bulgaria) Gabriela Koeva	Middle blocker	1.85	66	25 July 1989 (age 37)
8	(Bulgaria) Mariya Filipova	Libero	1.79	67	10 September 1982 (age 44)
9	(Azerbaijan) Anastasiya Bezsonova	Outside hitter	1.87	68	21 December 1999 (age 26)
10	(Serbia) Jovana Vesović	Outside hitter	1.83	67	21 July 1987 (age 39)
11	(Azerbaijan) Olena Hasanova	Middle blocker	1.88	73	25 November 1995 (age 30)
12	(Montenegro) Ksenija Ivanović	Outside hitter	1.88	78	22 May 1986 (age 40)
13	(Serbia) Slađana Mirković	Setter	1.85	72	7 October 1995 (age 30)
18	(Azerbaijan) Ulkar Karimova	Libero	1.83	78	22 June 1994 (age 32)

2015–2016 Team
Number	Player	Position	Height (m)	Weight (kg)	Birth
1	(Azerbaijan) Anastasiia Baidiuk	Outside hitter	1.89	67	5 December 1999 (age 26)
2	(Azerbaijan) Kristsina Yagubova	Setter	1.84	69	13 February 1996 (age 30)
3	(Azerbaijan) Yelyzaveta Samadova	Outside hitter	1.85	72	3 March 1995 (age 31)
5	(Azerbaijan) Marharyta Azizova	Outside hitter	1.86	73	25 April 1993 (age 33)
7	(Bulgaria) Gabriela Koeva	Middle blocker	1.85	66	25 July 1989 (age 37)
8	(Bulgaria) Mariya Filipova	Libero	1.79	67	10 September 1982 (age 44)
9	(Azerbaijan) Anastasiya Bezsonova	Outside hitter	1.87	68	21 December 1999 (age 26)
10	(Cuba) Ana Cleger	Opposite	1.85	73	27 November 1989 (age 36)
11	(Azerbaijan) Olena Hasanova	Middle blocker	1.88	73	25 November 1995 (age 30)
12	(Montenegro) Ksenija Ivanović	Outside hitter	1.88	78	22 May 1986 (age 40)
14	(Azerbaijan) Bayaz Aliyeva	Libero	1.76	60	9 June 1990 (age 36)
15	(Czech Republic) Lucie Mühlsteinová	Setter	1.78	70	15 October 1984 (age 41)
17	(Bulgaria) Hristina Ruseva	Middle blocker	1.90	77	1 October 1991 (age 35)

=== As Rabita Baku ===
2014–2015 Team
Number	Player	Position	Height (m)	Weight (kg)	Birth date
1	(Cuba) Wilma Salas	Outside hitter	1.91	72	9 March 1991 (age 35)
3	(Azerbaijan) Yelyzaveta Samadova	Outside hitter	1.85	72	3 March 1995 (age 31)
4	(Cuba) Yoana Palacios	Outside hitter	1.85	72	6 October 1990 (age 35)
5	(Serbia) Nataša Krsmanović	Middle-blocker	1.88	73	19 June 1985 (age 41)
6	(United States) Tetori Dixon	Middle-blocker	1.93	90	4 August 1992 (age 34)
7	(Cuba) Gyselle Silva	Opposite	1.92	80	29 October 1991 (age 34)
8	(Puerto Rico) Aurea Cruz	Outside hitter	1.80	73	10 January 1982 (age 44)
9	(Dominican Republic) Brenda Castillo	Libero	1.67	55	5 June 1992 (age 34)
10	(Cuba) Ana Cleger	Setter/Opposite	1.85	73	27 November 1989 (age 36)
11	(Azerbaijan) Olena Hasanova	Middle-blocker	1.88	73	25 November 1995 (age 30)
12	(Italy) Francesca Ferretti	Setter	1.80	70	15 February 1984 (age 42)
12	(Azerbaijan) Yana Azimova	Setter	1.74	63	5 July 1994 (age 32)
13	(Thailand) Nootsara Tomkom	Setter	1.69	57	7 July 1985 (age 41)
15	(Dominican Republic) Winifer Fernandez	Libero	1.66	54	6 January 1995 (age 31)
16	(United States) Foluke Akinradewo	Middle-blocker	1.91	79	5 October 1987 (age 38)
17	(Poland) Katarzyna Skowrońska	Opposite	1.89	75	30 June 1983 (age 43)
18	(Hungary) Dóra Horváth	Outside hitter	1.88	75	4 March 1988 (age 38)

2013–2014 Team
Number	Player	Position	Height (m)	Weight (kg)	Birth date
3	(Poland) Katarzyna Skorupa	Setter	1.83	69	16 September 1984 (age 42)
4	(Australia) Rachel Rourke	Opposite	1.94	78	1 October 1988 (age 38)
5	(Serbia) Nataša Krsmanović	Middle-blocker	1.88	73	19 June 1985 (age 41)
6	(United States) Tetori Dixon	Middle-blocker	1.93	90	4 August 1992 (age 34)
7	(United States) Kayla Banwarth	Libero	1.78	75	21 January 1989 (age 37)
8	(Puerto Rico) Aurea Cruz	Outside hitter	1.80	73	10 January 1982 (age 44)
9	(Dominican Republic) Brenda Castillo	Libero	1.67	55	5 June 1992 (age 34)
10	(United States) Gina Mancuso	Outside hitter	1.84	70	31 May 1991 (age 35)
11	(United States) Brittnee Cooper	Middle-blocker	1.91	77	26 February 1988 (age 38)
12	(United States) Cursty Jackson	Middle-blocker	1.86	65	11 September 1990 (age 36)
13	(Thailand) Nootsara Tomkom	Setter	1.69	57	7 July 1985 (age 41)
15	(Serbia) Sanja Starović (c)	Opposite	1.94	96	25 March 1983 (age 43)
16	(United States) Foluke Akinradewo	Middle-blocker	1.91	79	5 October 1987 (age 38)
17	(Poland) Katarzyna Skowrońska	Outside hitter	1.89	75	30 June 1983 (age 43)
18	(Hungary) Dóra Horváth	Outside hitter	1.88	75	4 March 1988 (age 38)

2012–2013 Team
Number	Player	Position	Height (m)	Weight (kg)	Birth date
1	(Bulgaria) Dobriana Rabadzhieva	Outside hitter	1.94	72	14 June 1991 (age 35)
2	(Germany) Angelina Grün	Outside hitter/Opposite	1.85	74	2 December 1979 (age 46)
3	(Poland) Katarzyna Skorupa	Setter	1.83	69	16 September 1984 (age 42)
5	(Serbia) Nataša Krsmanović	Middle-blocker	1.88	73	19 June 1985 (age 41)
7	(Colombia) Madelaynne Montaño	Opposite	1.86	68	6 January 1983 (age 43)
8	(Puerto Rico) Aurea Cruz	Outside hitter	1.80	73	10 January 1982 (age 44)
9	(Dominican Republic) Brenda Castillo	Libero	1.67	55	5 June 1992 (age 34)
10	(Ukraine) Alexandra Fomina	Libero	1.80	73	4 May 1975 (age 51)
11	(Belarus) Katsiaryna Zakreuskaya	Outside hitter	1.86	70	29 September 1986 (age 40)
12	(Serbia) Mira Golubović (c)	Middle-blocker	1.88	74	15 October 1976 (age 49)
15	(Serbia) Sanja Starović	Opposite	1.94	96	25 March 1983 (age 43)
16	(United States) Foluke Akinradewo	Middle-blocker	1.91	79	5 October 1987 (age 38)
17	(Ukraine) Iryna Zhukova	Setter	1.79	72	22 November 1974 (age 51)
18	(Serbia) Suzana Ćebić	Libero	1.67	60	9 November 1984 (age 41)

2011–2012 Team
Number	Player	Position	Height (m)	Weight (kg)	Birth date
1	(Bulgaria) Dobriana Rabadzhieva	Outside hitter	1.94	72	14 June 1991 (age 35)
2	(Azerbaijan) Madina Aliyeva	Outside hitter	1.70	65	18 March 1990 (age 36)
5	(Serbia) Nataša Krsmanović	Middle-blocker	1.88	73	19 June 1985 (age 41)
6	(Serbia) Jasna Majstorović	Outside hitter	1.80	64	23 April 1984 (age 42)
7	(United States) Mary Spicer	Setter	1.77	66	3 July 1987 (age 39)
8	(Serbia) Silvija Popović	Libero	1.75	64	15 March 1986 (age 40)
9	(Azerbaijan) Natalya Mammadova	Outside hitter	1.95	81	2 December 1984 (age 41)
10	(United States) Kimberly Glass	Outside hitter	1.90	83	18 August 1984 (age 42)
11	(Turkey) Pelin Çelik	Setter	1.72	57	23 May 1982 (age 44)
12	(Serbia) Mira Golubović	Middle-blocker	1.88	74	15 October 1976 (age 49)
13	(Croatia) Nataša Osmokrović	Outside hitter	1.84	69	27 May 1976 (age 50)
14	(Germany) Kathy Radzuweit	Middle-blocker	1.96	76	2 March 1982 (age 44)
15	(Serbia) Sanja Starović	Opposite	1.94	96	25 March 1983 (age 43)
17	(Ukraine) Iryna Zhukova	Setter	1.79	72	22 November 1974 (age 51)

2010–2011 Team
Number	Player	Position	Height (m)	Weight (kg)	Birth date
1	(Bulgaria) Diana Nenova	Setter	1.82	72	16 April 1985 (age 41)
2	(Serbia) Bojana Doganjić	Outside hitter	1.83	70	15 April 1979 (age 47)
3	(Croatia) Mirela Delić	Middle-blocker	1.89	80	13 November 1981 (age 44)
4	(Croatia) Marina Miletić	Outside hitter	1.81	58	21 February 1983 (age 43)
5	(Serbia) Nataša Krsmanović	Middle-blocker	1.88	73	19 June 1985 (age 41)
7	(Latvia) Olga Ativi	Opposite	1.89	70	7 January 1982 (age 44)
8	(Serbia) Silvija Popović	Libero	1.75	64	15 March 1986 (age 40)
9	(Azerbaijan) Natalya Mammadova	Outside hitter	1.95	81	2 December 1984 (age 41)
10	(United States) Kimberly Glass	Outside hitter	1.90	83	18 August 1984 (age 42)
12	(Serbia) Mira Golubović	Middle-blocker	1.88	74	15 October 1976 (age 49)
15	(Serbia) Sanja Starović	Opposite	1.94	96	25 March 1983 (age 43)
17	(Ukraine) Iryna Zhukova	Setter	1.79	72	22 November 1974 (age 51)
18	(Ukraine) Lidiya Luchko	Middle-blocker	1.86	70	25 March 1983 (age 43)

2009–2010 Team
Number	Player	Position	Height (m)	Weight (kg)	Birth date
2	(Serbia) Bojana Doganjić	Outside hitter	1.83	70	15 April 1979 (age 47)
5	(Azerbaijan) Farida Rasulova	Outside hitter	1.80	67	29 October 1987 (age 38)
7	(Belarus) Viktoryia Hurava	Setter	1.82	74	30 January 1984 (age 42)
8	(Serbia) Silvija Popović	Libero	1.75	64	15 March 1986 (age 40)
9	(Ukraine) Olga Andrusenko	Outside hitter	1.82	79	10 January 1980 (age 46)
10	(Serbia) Vesna Tomašević	Outside hitter	1.87	84	10 September 1981 (age 45)
13	(Brazil) Rosangela Correia	Outside hitter	1.89	71	24 July 1972 (age 54)
14	(Serbia) Aleksandra Avramović	Middle-blocker	1.89	80	3 July 1982 (age 44)
15	(Serbia) Sanja Starović	Opposite	1.94	96	25 March 1983 (age 43)
16	(Ukraine) Ganna Yevsikova	Middle-blocker	1.92	88	24 February 1981 (age 45)
17	(Bulgaria) Evelina Tsvetanova	Setter	1.80	55	22 April 1974 (age 52)
18	(Ukraine) Lidiya Luchko	Middle-blocker	1.86	70	25 March 1983 (age 43)

== Honours ==
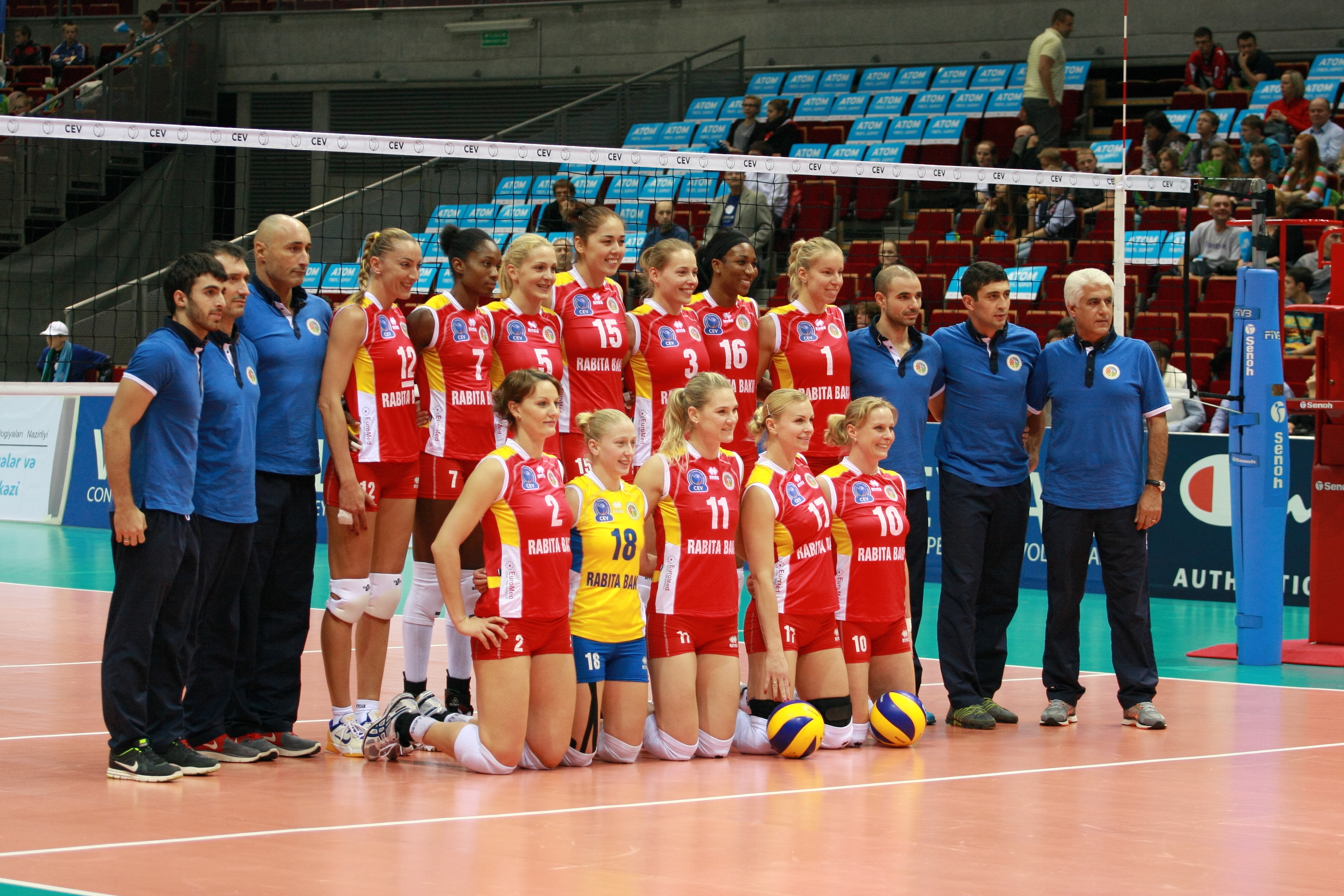
Rabita Baku in 2012.

=== International success ===
- FIVB Volleyball Women's Club World Championship:
  - Champion (1): 2011
  - Runners-up (1): 2012
- Women's CEV Champions League:
  - Runners-up (2): 2010-2011, 2012-2013
  - Third (1): 2013-2014

=== Domestic success ===
- Azerbaijan Superleague:
  - Winners (7): 2008–09, 2009–10, 2010–11, 2011–12, 2012-13, 2013-14, 2014–15
  - Runners-up (5): 2003–04, 2004–05, 2005–06, 2006–07, 2007–08
  - Third (1): 2002-03
