= Natalya Mammadova =

Ukrainian-born Azerbaijani volleyball player

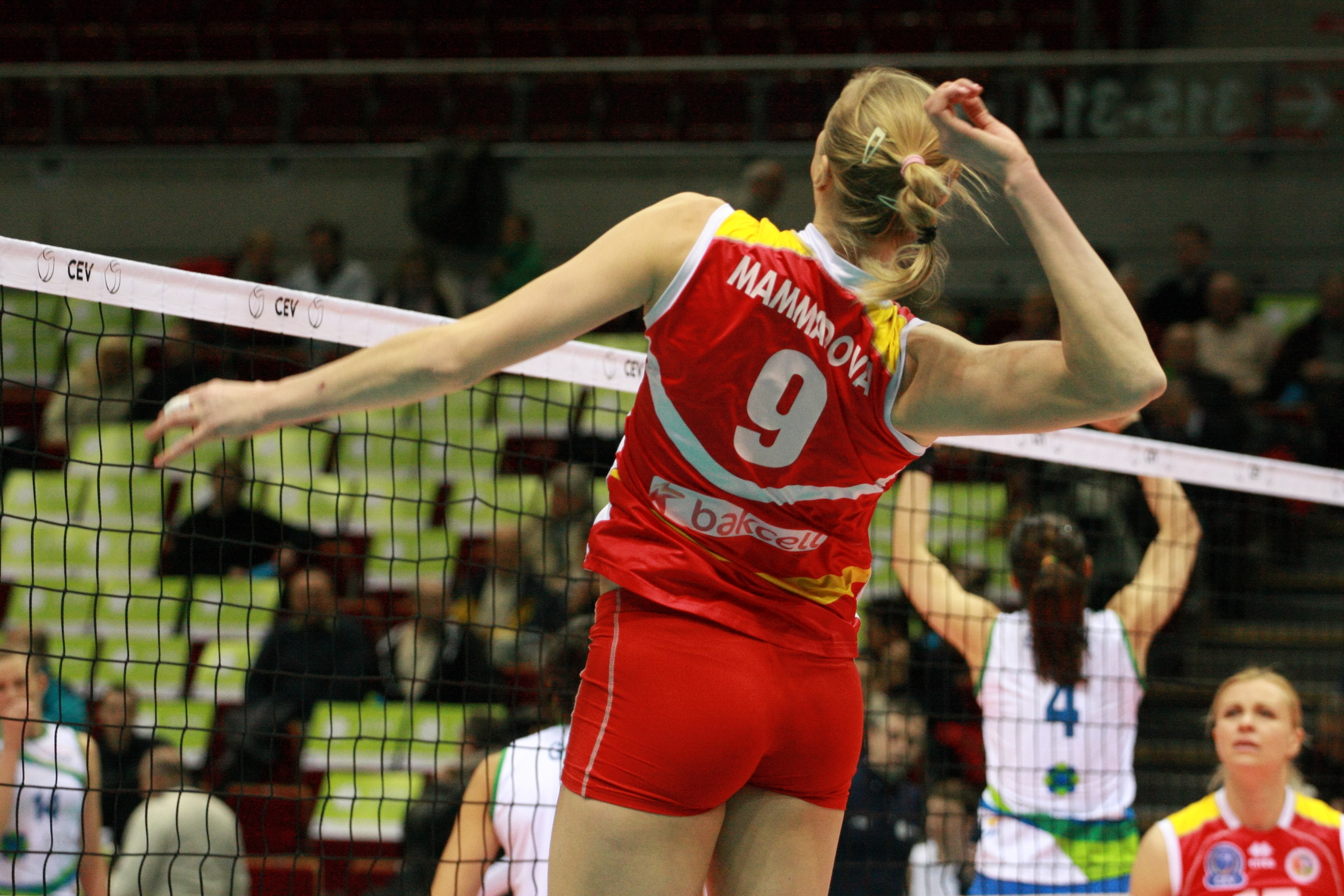
- Mammadova with Rabita Baku in 2012

Personal information
- Full name: Natalya Aleksandrovna Mammadova-Skazka
- Nationality: Ukrainian; Azerbaijani
- Born: 2 December 1984 (age 41); Donetsk, Ukraine, USSR
- Hometown: Baku, Azerbaijan
- Height: 1.98 m (6 ft 6 in)
- Weight: 75 kg (165 lb)
- Spike: 330 cm (130 in)
- Block: 302 cm (119 in)

Volleyball information
- Position: Outside hitter / Opposite

Career
Years	Teams
2002–2003; 2003–2005; 2005–2006; 2006–2007; 2006–2007; 2007–2008; 2007–2008; 2008–2009; 2009–2010; 2010–2011; 2012–2014; 2014–2017; 2017–2018; 2018; 2019; 2020; 2020–2021	Zarechie Odintsovo; Azerrail Baku; Voléro Zürich; Azerrail Baku; Bigmat Sanpaolo Chieri; Voléro Zürich; İcaro Palma; Türk Telekom Ankara; Dinamo Krasnodar; Rabita Baku; Omichka Omsk; Voléro Zürich; WVC Dynamo Kazan; Altay VC; Liaoning women's volleyball team Jakarta Pertamina Energy; Volero le Cannet

National team
2004–2018	Azerbaijan

Natalya Aleksandrovna Mammadova (Ukrainian: Наталія Мамедова; born 2 December 1984) is a retired Ukrainian and Azerbaijani volleyball player. Natalya played as an outside hitter and is widely recognized as one of the best players of her generation, as well as the most successful Azerbaijani volleyball player. Natalya represented Azerbaijan national team from 2004 until 2018 and is one of the most capped players in the history of the country. She announced her retirement from volleyball in May 2021.

== Career ==
Natalya won the League Round "Best Scorer" award three seasons in a row, from 2004/05 with Azerrail Baku also winning the League Round "Best Attacker"; in 2005/06 and the 2006/07.

Mammadova lost the final game at the 2010–11 CEV Champions League Final Four with her team Rabita Baku, finishing as Runner-up and winning the "Best Server" award.

Mammadova won the bronze medal at the 2015 FIVB Club World Championship, playing with the Swiss club Voléro Zürich.

== Awards ==
=== Individuals ===
- 2004–05 CEV Indesit Champions League League Round "Best Scorer"
- 2004–05 CEV Indesit Champions League League Round "Best Attacker"
- 2005–06 CEV Indesit Champions League League Round "Best Scorer"
- 2006 Swiss Championship Finals "Best Scorer"
- 2006–07 CEV Indesit Champions League League Round "Best Scorer"
- 2007 "European Player of the Year"
- 2007 Swiss Championship "Most Valuable Player"
- 2007 Swiss Championship "Best Scorer"
- 2007 Swiss Cup "Most Valuable Player"
- 2009–10 Russian Superleague "Best Scorer"
- 2010–11 CEV Champions League Final Four "Best Server"
- 2010–11 Azerbaijan Superleague "Best Spiker"
- 2011–12 Azerbaijan Superleague "Most Valuable Player"
- 2012–13 Russian Superleague "Best Scorer"
- 2017 Russian Cup "Most Valuable Player"

=== Clubs ===
- 2002–03 Russian Cup – Champion, with Zarechie Odintsovo
- 2003–04 Azerbaijan Superleague – Champion, with Azerrail Baku
- 2004–05 Azerbaijan Superleague – Champion, with Azerrail Baku
- 2005–06 Swiss Championship – Champion, with Voléro Zürich
- 2005–06 Swiss Cup – Champion, with Voléro Zürich
- 2007–08 Spanish Superliga – Runner-Up, with İcaro Palma
- 2008–09 Turkish Women's Volleyball League – Bronze medal, with Türk Telekom Ankara
- 2009–10 Russian Superleague – Bronze medal, with Dinamo Krasnodar
- 2010–11 CEV Champions League – Runner-Up, with Rabita Baku
- 2010–11 Azerbaijan Superleague – Champion, with Rabita Baku
- 2011 FIVB Club World Championship – Champion, with Rabita Baku
- 2011–12 Azerbaijan Superleague – Champion, with Rabita Baku
- 2012–13 Russian Superleague – Bronze medal, with Omichka Omsk
- 2013–14 Russian Superleague – Bronze medal, with Omichka Omsk
- 2015 FIVB Club World Championship – Bronze medal, with Voléro Zürich
- 2017 FIVB Club World Championship – Bronze medal, with Voléro Zürich
- 2017 Russian Cup – Champion, with WVC Dynamo Kazan
