= Kathy Radzuweit =

German volleyball player (born 1982)

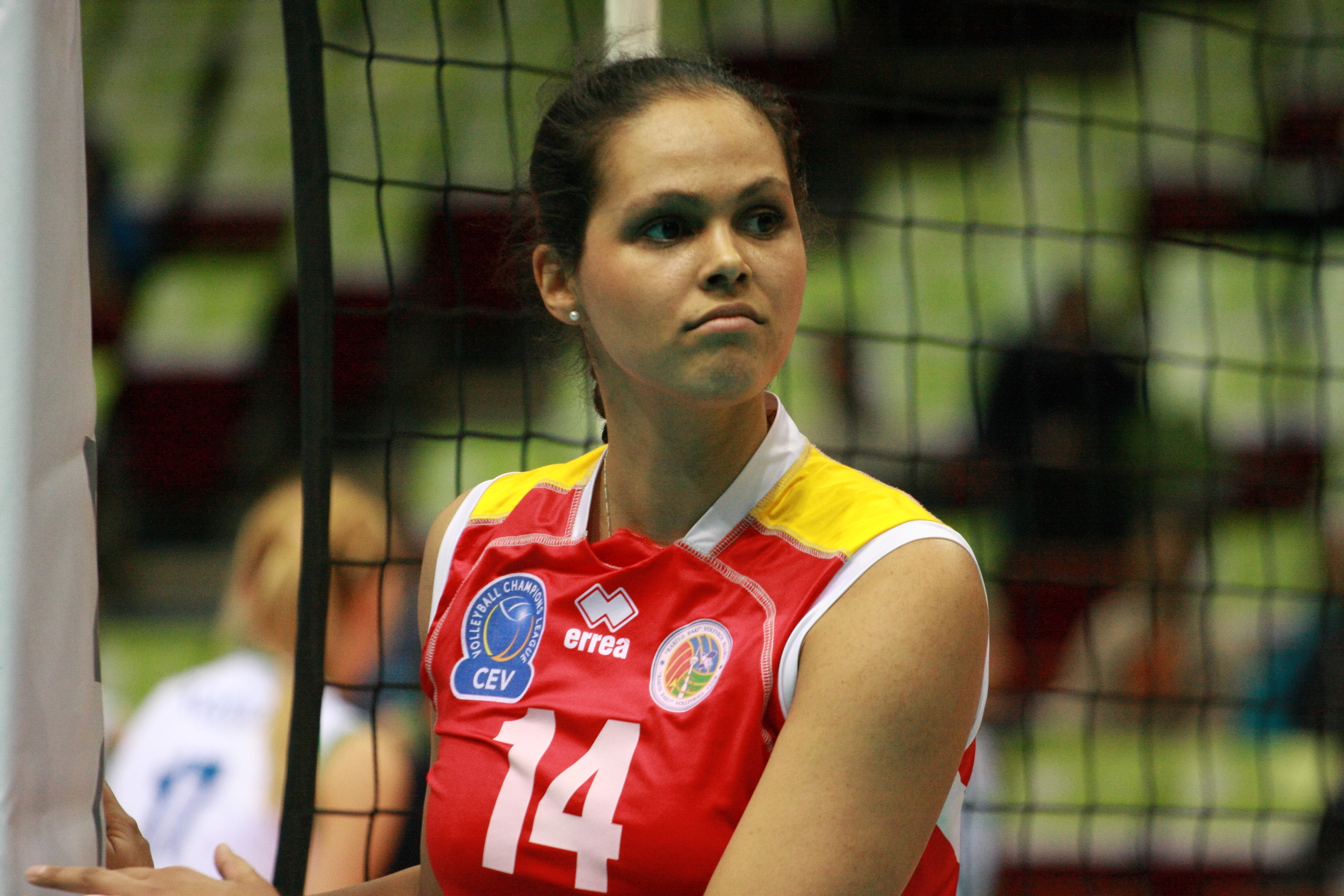
- Radzuweit playing for Rabita Baku on 1 February 2012.

Personal information
- Nationality: German
- Born: March 2, 1982 (age 44); East-Berlin, East Germany
- Height: 196cm (6ft 5in)
Honours
Women's volleyball
Representing Germany
European Championship
Bronze medal – third place	2003 Ankara	Team competition
FIVB Grand Prix
Bronze medal – third place	2002 Hong Kong	Team competition

Kathy Radzuweit (born March 2, 1982) is a German retired volleyball player, who was a member of the German Women's Team at the 2004 Summer Olympics in Athens, Greece. She played at the 2002 FIVB Volleyball Women's World Championship in Germany. On club level she played with Volley Cats Berlin.

She is 196 cm and played as middle attacker.

== Individual awards ==
- 2003 European Championship "Best Blocker"
