= Mira Golubović =

Serbian volleyball player

Personal information
- Full name: Mira Golubović
- Nationality: Serbia
- Born: 15 October 1976 (age 50)
- Height: 1.85 m (6 ft 1 in)
- Weight: 70 kg (150 lb)

Volleyball information
- Position: Middle Blocker

Career
Years	Teams
2001-2007	OK Jedinstvo Užice
2007-2008	Voléro Zürich
2008-2009	Poštar 064 Beograd
2009-	RC Cannes

National team
2000-2003	Serbia and Montenegro
- Last updated: 26 July 2010

Mira Golubović (Serbian Cyrillic: Мира Голубовић; born 15 October 1976) is a retired volleyball player from Serbia. She played for national team and various clubs in Europe last being Voléro Zürich from Switzerland.

== Clubs ==
Club	Country	From	To
Radnički Belgrade	FR Yugoslavia	1993	1994
Jedinstvo Užice	FR Yugoslavia	1994	1998
Rapid Bucharest	Romania	1998	1999
Volley Bergamo	Italy	1999	2000
Pallavolo Reggio Emilia	Italy	Oct. 2000	Dec. 2000
Perugia	Italy	Dec. 2000	2002
Toray Arrows	Japan	2002	2003
CV Las Palmas	Spain	2003	2005
CV Tenerife	Spain	2005	2006
Voléro Zürich	Switzerland	2006	2007
Spartak Omsk	Russia	2007	2009
CSU Metal Galați	Romania	2009	2010
Rabita Baku	Azerbaijan	2010	2013
Voléro Zürich	Switzerland	2013	2014

== Achievements ==
Domestic championships

- Serbia and Montenegro Championship (4): 1995, 1996, 1997, 1998
- Azerbaijani Championship (3): 2011, 2012, 2013
- Romanian Championship (2): 1999, 2010
- Swiss Championship (2): 2007, 2014
- Spanish Championship (1): 2006

Domestic Cups

- Serbia and Montenegro Cup (3): 1994, 1996, 1997
- Swiss Cup (2): 2007, 2014
- Copa de la Reina (1): 2006
- Romanian Cup (1): 2010

Domestic Super Cups

- Italian Super Cup (1): 1999
- Spanish Super Cup (1): 2005
- Swiss Super Cup (1): 2006

International

- FIVB Volleyball Women's Club World Championship (1): 2011
- Champions League (1): 2000
