= Sanja Starović =

Serbian volleyball player

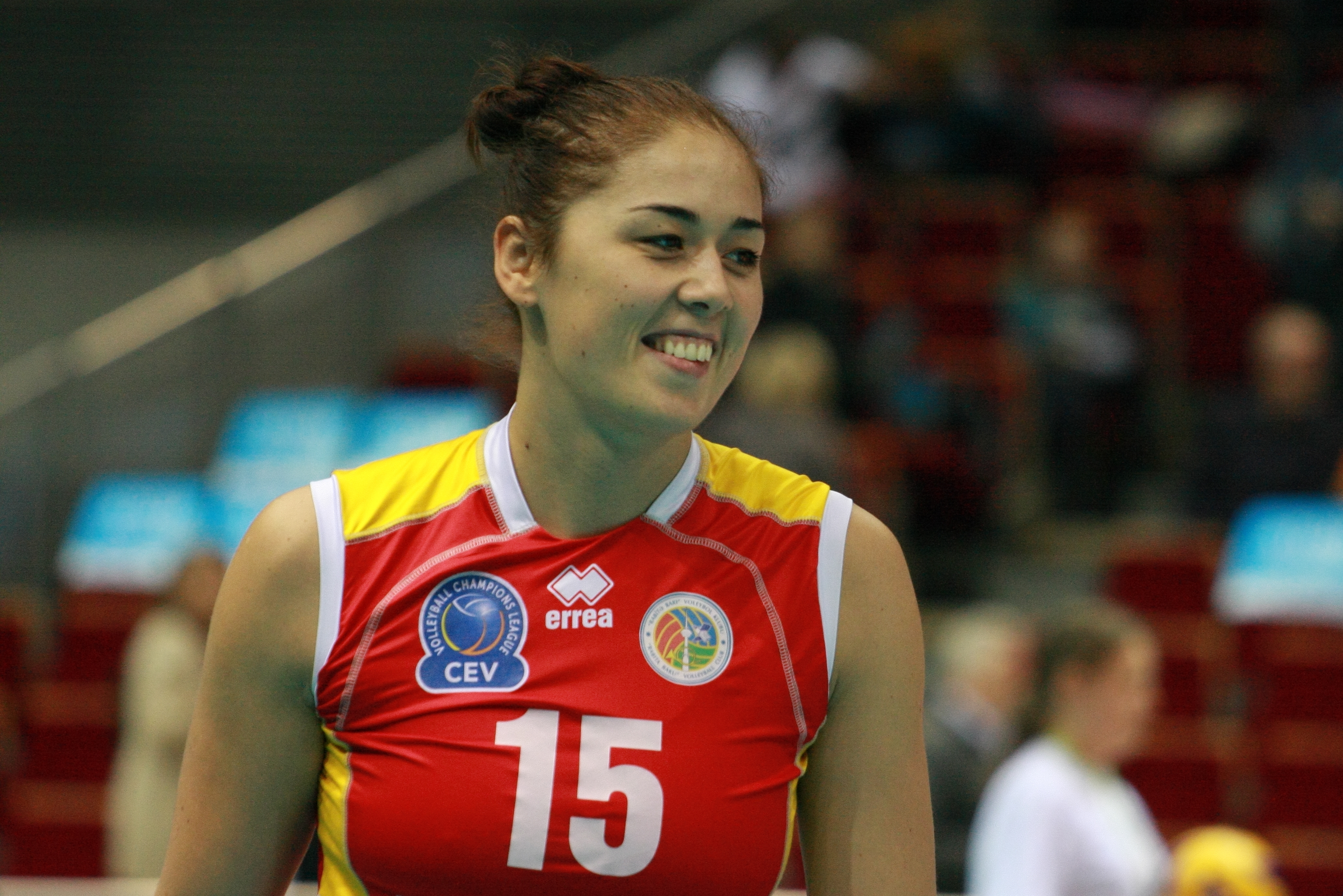

Medal record

Women's volleyball

Representing Serbia

European League
Bronze medal – third place	2012 Karlovy Vary	Team

Universiade
Silver medal – second place	2007 Bangkok	Team

Sanja Starović (Serbian: Сања Старовић, born 25 March 1983) is a Serbian professional volleyball player. She has played for Serbia women's national volleyball team, competing in the 2012 Summer Olympics. She is 1.95 m (6 ft 5 in) tall.

== Career ==
Starović won the silver medal in the 2012 FIVB Club World Championship, playing with the Azerbaijani club Rabita Baku.

Starović's club, Rabita Baku won the Bronze Medal at the 2013–14 CEV Champions League after losing 0-3 to the Russian Dinamo Kazan in the semifinals, but defeating the Turkish Eczacıbaşı VitrA Istanbul 3-0 in the third-place match.

== Personal life ==
Her brother, Saša Starović is also a volleyball player.

== Awards ==
=== Individuals ===
- 2009–10 CEV Cup Final Four "Best spiker"

=== Clubs ===
- 2011 FIVB Club World Championship - Champion, with Rabita Baku
- 2012 FIVB Club World Championship - Runner-Up, with Rabita Baku
- 2012–13 CEV Champions League - Runner-Up, with Rabita Baku
- 2013–14 CEV Champions League – Bronze medal, with Rabita Baku
