= Türk Telekom Ankara =

Volleyball team in Ankara, Turkey

- Full name: Türk Telekom Gençlik ve Spor Kulübü
- Short name: Türk Telekom
- Founded: 1954
- Dissolved: 2009
- Ground: Selim Sırrı Tarcan Sport Hall (Capacity: 2,000)
- Chairman: (Turkey) Celahattin Dinçer
- Manager: (China) Lang Ping
- Captain: (Turkey) Bahar Mert
- League: Turkish Women's Volleyball League

Uniforms
Home	Away

Active departments of Türk Telekom
Football	Basketball	Volleyball

Türk Telekom Ankara is a professional volleyball team based in Ankara, Turkey. It plays in the Turkish Women's Volleyball League and in the Women's CEV Cup. Türk Telekom multisports was established in 1954. The section volleyball was opened in 1998.

Türk Telekom Volleyball branch closed on July 24, 2009.

== Previous names ==
- 8 June 2004 - 22 August 2004 : Türk Telekom Aycell Ankara
- 23 August 2004 - 5 June 2006 : Türk Telekom Avea Ankara
- 6 June 2006 - July 24, 2009: Türk Telekom Ankara

== Team Roster Season 2008-2009 ==
No	Player	Birth Date	Height	Position	Nationality
1	Bahar Mert	13.12.1975	1,83	Setter	Turkey
2	Melis Hemseri	20.03.1978	1,82	Outside Hitter	Turkey
4	Özlem Özçelik	01.01.1972	1,90	Middle Blocker	Turkey
5	Olga Kubassevich	22.09.1985	1,84	Opposite	Kazakhstan
7	Ebru Elhan	19.02.1982	1,85	Outside Hitter	Turkey
8	Nilay Konar	30.08.1980	1,90	Middle Blocker	Turkey
9	Natalya Mammadova	02.12.1984	1,95	Outside Hitter	Azerbaijan
10	Güldeniz Önal	25.03.1986	1,84	Outside Hitter	Turkey
11	Nilay Benli	24.10.1985	1,79	Setter	Turkey
12	Taismary Agüero	05.03.1977	1,78	Opposite	Italy
15	Funda Bilgi	06.04.1983	1,68	Libero	Turkey
18	Maja Poljak	02.05.1983	1,94	Middle Blocker	Croatia

== See also ==
- See also Türk Telekom B.K. Basketball team.
- See also Türk Telekomspor Football team.
