= 2010–11 CEV Women's Champions League =

- League: CEV Women's Champions League
- Sport: Volleyball

Finales
- Champions: (Turkey) VakıfBank Güneş TTelekom
- Finals MVP: (Poland) Małgorzata Glinka

CEV Women's Champions League seasons
- ← 2009–10 2011–12 →

The 2010–11 CEV Women's Champions League was the highest level of European club volleyball in the 2010–11 season and was the 37th edition.

== Teams of the 2010–2011 competition ==
The number of participants on the basis of ranking list for European Cup Competitions:

Rank	Country	Number of teams	Teams
1	Italy	3	Volley Bergamo; Villa Cortese; Scavolini Pesaro
2	Russia	2	Dynamo Moscow; Zarechye Odintsovo
3	Spain	1	Aguere La Laguna
4	Turkey	3	Fenerbahçe Acıbadem; VakıfBank Güneş Sigorta Türk Telekom; Eczacıbaşı Vitra (w/c)
5	France	2	RC Cannes; ASPTT Mulhouse
6	Poland	3	Bielsko-Biała; Organika Budowlani Łódź; Muszynianka Muszyna (w/c)
8	Switzerland	1	Voléro Zürich
9	Serbia	1	Crvena Zvezda
10	Croatia	1	ZOK Split
11	Romania	1	Dinamo Romprest Bucharest
16	Azerbaijan	1	Rabita Baku (w/c)
23	Czech Republic	1	Modřanská Prostějov (w/c)

- The drawing of lots for the main phase (group stage) of the competition was being held on 25 June 2010, in Vienna.

== League round ==
- 20 teams were drawn to 5 pools of 4 teams each.
- The 1st – 2nd and the two best 3rd ranked qualified for the Playoffs 12.
- The organizer of the Final Four was determined after the end of the League Round and qualified directly for the Final Four.
- The team of the organizer of the Final Four was replaced by the 3rd ranked team with the best score.
- The two next 3rd and two best 4th ranked teams moved to CEV Cup. The remaining teams were eliminated.

=== Pool A ===
Pos	Team	Pld	W	L	Pts	SPW	SPL	SPR	SW	SL	SR	Qualification
1	(Turkey) VakıfBank Güneş TTelekom	6	6	0	16	562	440	1.277	18	6	3.000	Playoffs 12
2	(Poland) Muszynianka Muszyna	6	3	3	9	552	545	1.013	13	13	1.000	Playoffs 12
3	(Russia) Zarechye Odintsovo	6	3	3	9	538	561	0.959	13	14	0.929	Playoffs 12
4	(Serbia) Crvena Zvezda	6	0	6	2	468	574	0.815	7	18	0.389	

November 23–25, 2010

	Score		Set 1	Set 2	Set 3	Set 4	Set 5
Crvena Zvezda	SRB	2–3	VakıfBank Güneş TTelekom	TUR	19–25	25–19	25–19
Muszynianka Muszyna	POL	2–3	Zarechye Odintsovo	RUS	25–10	25–16	22–25

December 1, 2010

	Score		Set 1	Set 2	Set 3	Set 4	Set 5
Zarechye Odintsovo	RUS	3–1	Crvena Zvezda	SRB	26–24	25–22	16–25
VakıfBank Güneş TTelekom	TUR	3–1	Muszynianka Muszyna	POL	25–16	22–25	25–14

December 7–8, 2010

	Score		Set 1	Set 2	Set 3	Set 4	Set 5
Crvena Zvezda	SRB	1–3	Muszynianka Muszyna	POL	9–25	27–25	20–25
VakıfBank Güneş TTelekom	TUR	3–0	Zarechyie Odintsovo	RUS	28–26	25–18	25–9

December 15–16, 2010

	Score		Set 1	Set 2	Set 3	Set 4	Set 5
Zarechye Odintsovo	RUS	2–3	VakıfBank Güneş TTelekom	TUR	25–23	18–25	18–25
Muszynianka Muszyna	POL	3–1	Crvena Zvezda	SRB	25–20	25–21	23–25

January 4–6, 2011

	Score		Set 1	Set 2	Set 3	Set 4	Set 5
Crvena Zvezda	SRB	2–3	Zarechye Odintsovo	RUS	25–23	16–25	11–25
Muszynianka Muszyna	POL	1–3	VakıfBank Güneş TTelekom	TUR	25–23	20–25	14–25

January 11, 2011

	Score		Set 1	Set 2	Set 3	Set 4	Set 5
Zarechye Odintsovo	RUS	2–3	Muszynianka Muszyna	POL	25–19	25–18	14–25
VakıfBank Güneş TTelekom	TUR	3–0	Crvena Zvezda	SRB	25–8	25–15	25–16

=== Pool B ===
Pos	Team	Pld	W	L	Pts	SPW	SPL	SPR	SW	SL	SR	Qualification
1	(Turkey) Fenerbahçe Acıbadem	6	5	1	15	430	317	1.356	15	3	5.000	Playoffs 12
2	(Russia) Dynamo Moscow	6	5	1	15	445	345	1.290	15	4	3.750	Playoffs 12
3	(Italy) Volley Bergamo	6	2	4	6	434	448	0.969	7	13	0.538	
4	(Croatia) ZOK Split	6	0	6	0	275	474	0.580	1	18	0.056	

November 25, 2010

	Score		Set 1	Set 2	Set 3	Set 4	Set 5
Dynamo Moscow	RUS	3–0	ZOK Split	CRO	25–15	25–15	25–16
Fenerbahçe Acıbadem	TUR	3–0	Volley Bergamo	ITA	26–24	25–23	25–18

November 30– December 2, 2010

	Score		Set 1	Set 2	Set 3	Set 4	Set 5
ZOK Split	CRO	0–3	Fenerbahçe Acıbadem	TUR	16–25	15–25	13–25
Volley Bergamo	ITA	1–3	Dynamo Moscow	RUS	17–25	28–26	17–25

December 7–8, 2010

	Score		Set 1	Set 2	Set 3	Set 4	Set 5
ZOK Split	CRO	1–3	Volley Bergamo	ITA	26–24	18–25	11–25
Dynamo Moscow	RUS	3–0	Fenerbahçe Acıbadem	TUR	25–16	25–21	25–17

December 13, 2010

	Score		Set 1	Set 2	Set 3	Set 4	Set 5
Fenerbahçe Acıbadem	TUR	3–0	Dynamo Moscow	RUS	25–14	25–15	25–15
Volley Bergamo	ITA	3–0	ZOK Split	CRO	25–14	25–18	25–13

January 6, 2011

	Score		Set 1	Set 2	Set 3	Set 4	Set 5
Fenerbahçe Acıbadem	TUR	3–0	ZOK Split	CRO	25–10	25–11	25–13
Dynamo Moscow	RUS	3–0	Volley Bergamo	ITA	25–22	25–18	25–16

January 11, 2011

	Score		Set 1	Set 2	Set 3	Set 4	Set 5
Volley Bergamo	ITA	0–3	Fenerbahçe Acıbadem	TUR	13–25	23–25	19–25
ZOK Split	CRO	0–3	Dynamo Moscow	RUS	7–25	12–25	11–25

=== Pool C ===
Pos	Team	Pld	W	L	Pts	SPW	SPL	SPR	SW	SL	SR	Qualification
1	(Turkey) Eczacıbaşı Vitra	6	5	1	16	525	416	1.262	17	5	3.400	Playoffs 12
2	(Switzerland) Voléro Zürich	6	5	1	14	526	486	1.082	16	8	2.000	Playoffs 12
3	(France) ASPTT Mulhouse	6	2	4	6	435	438	0.993	8	12	0.667	
4	(Spain) Aguere La Laguna	6	0	6	0	348	494	0.704	2	18	0.111	

November 23–24, 2010

	Score		Set 1	Set 2	Set 3	Set 4	Set 5
ASPTT Mulhouse	FRA	3–0	Aguere La Laguna	ESP	25–18	25–21	25–18
Eczacıbaşı Vitra	TUR	3–1	Voléro Zürich	SUI	22–25	25–20	25–9

December 1, 2010

	Score		Set 1	Set 2	Set 3	Set 4	Set 5
Aguere La Laguna	ESP	1–3	Eczacıbaşı Vitra	TUR	17–25	25–22	17–25
Voléro Zürich	SUI	3–1	ASPTT Mulhouse	FRA	25–16	16–25	25–15

December 8, 2010

	Score		Set 1	Set 2	Set 3	Set 4	Set 5
Eczacıbaşı Vitra	TUR	3–0	ASPTT Mulhouse	FRA	25–15	26–24	25–20
Voléro Zürich	SUI	3–1	Aguere La Laguna	ESP	22–25	25–18	25–16

December 15–16, 2010

	Score		Set 1	Set 2	Set 3	Set 4	Set 5
Aguere La Laguna	ESP	0–3	Voléro Zürich	SUI	15–25	19–25	20–25
ASPTT Mulhouse	FRA	0–3	Eczacıbaşı Vitra	TUR	23–25	20–25	23–25

January 4–6, 2011

	Score		Set 1	Set 2	Set 3	Set 4	Set 5
ASPTT Mulhouse	FRA	1–3	Voléro Zürich	SUI	18–25	23–25	25–18
Eczacıbaşı Vitra	TUR	3–0	Aguere La Laguna	ESP	25–19	25–11	25–12

January 11, 2011

	Score		Set 1	Set 2	Set 3	Set 4	Set 5
Aguere La Laguna	ESP	0–3	ASPTT Mulhouse	FRA	15–25	17–25	14–25
Voléro Zürich	SUI	3–2	Eczacıbaşı Vitra	TUR	25–19	23–25	25–23

=== Pool D ===
Pos	Team	Pld	W	L	Pts	SPW	SPL	SPR	SW	SL	SR	Qualification
1	(Italy) Villa Cortese	6	4	2	13	516	491	1.051	14	9	1.556	Playoffs 12
2	(France) RC Cannes	6	4	2	12	544	489	1.112	15	9	1.667	Playoffs 12
3	(Czech Republic) Modřanská Prostějov	6	3	3	9	516	503	1.026	12	11	1.091	Playoffs 12
4	(Poland) Organika Budowlani Łódź	6	1	5	2	431	524	0.823	5	17	0.294	

November 23–25, 2010

	Score		Set 1	Set 2	Set 3	Set 4	Set 5
Organika Budowlani Łódź	POL	1–3	Villa Cortese	ITA	19–25	17–25	25–16
Modřanská Prostějov	CZE	1–3	RC Cannes	FRA	22–25	24–26	25–21

November 30, 2010

	Score		Set 1	Set 2	Set 3	Set 4	Set 5
Villa Cortese	ITA	3–0	Modřanská Prostějov	CZE	25–19	25–23	30–28
RC Cannes	FRA	3–0	Organika Budowlani Łódź	POL	25–12	25–22	26–24

December 9, 2010

	Score		Set 1	Set 2	Set 3	Set 4	Set 5
Modřanská Prostějov	CZE	3–0	Organika Budowlani Łódź	POL	25–17	25–15	25–21
RC Cannes	FRA	3–2	Villa Cortese	ITA	25–22	18–25	20–25

December 14–15, 2010

	Score		Set 1	Set 2	Set 3	Set 4	Set 5
Organika Budowlani Łódź	POL	3–2	Modřanská Prostějov	CZE	16–25	20–25	29–27
Villa Cortese	ITA	3–1	RC Cannes	FRA	15–25	25–18	25–18

January 4–5, 2011

	Score		Set 1	Set 2	Set 3	Set 4	Set 5
Organika Budowlani Łódź	POL	0–3	RC Cannes	FRA	18–25	22–25	16–25
Modřanská Prostějov	CZE	3–0	Villa Cortese	ITA	25–21	25–19	25–19

January 11, 2011

	Score		Set 1	Set 2	Set 3	Set 4	Set 5
Villa Cortese	ITA	3–1	Organika Budowlani Łódź	POL	18–25	25–19	25–15
RC Cannes	FRA	2–3	Modřanská Prostějov	CZE	25–13	22–25	21–25

=== Pool E ===
Pos	Team	Pld	W	L	Pts	SPW	SPL	SPR	SW	SL	SR	Qualification
1	(Azerbaijan) Rabita Baku	6	4	2	14	521	458	1.138	16	7	2.286	Playoffs 12
2	(Italy) Scavolini Pesaro	6	5	1	12	560	501	1.118	16	9	1.778	Playoffs 12
3	(Poland) Bielsko-Biała	6	3	3	9	575	578	0.995	13	14	0.929	Playoffs 12
4	(Romania) Dinamo Romprest Bucharest	6	0	6	1	404	523	0.772	3	18	0.167	

November 24, 2010

	Score		Set 1	Set 2	Set 3	Set 4	Set 5
Dinamo Romprest Bucharest	ROU	0–3	Rabita Baku	AZE	18–25	22–25	20–25
Scavolini Pesaro	ITA	3–2	Bielsko-Biała	POL	23–25	25–22	25–20

November 30– December 2, 2010

	Score		Set 1	Set 2	Set 3	Set 4	Set 5
Bielsko-Biała	POL	3–2	Dinamo Romprest Bucharest	ROU	24–26	25–19	34–36
Rabita Baku	AZE	3–1	Scavolini Pesaro	ITA	25–19	25–23	23–25

December 8–9, 2010

	Score		Set 1	Set 2	Set 3	Set 4	Set 5
Scavolini Pesaro	ITA	3–0	Dinamo Romprest Bucharest	ROU	25–22	25–19	25–15
Bielsko-Biała	POL	3–2	Rabita Baku	AZE	25–21	21–25	25–18

December 14–16, 2010

	Score		Set 1	Set 2	Set 3	Set 4	Set 5
Dinamo Romprest Bucharest	ROU	0–3	Scavolini Pesaro	ITA	12–25	20–25	21–25
Rabita Baku	AZE	3–0	Bielsko-Biała	POL	25–13	25–23	25–12

January 5–6, 2011

	Score		Set 1	Set 2	Set 3	Set 4	Set 5
Dinamo Romprest Bucharest	ROU	1–3	Bielsko-Biała	POL	16–25	21–25	27–25
Scavolini Pesaro	ITA	3–2	Rabita Baku	AZE	20–25	25–21	25–19

January 11, 2011

	Score		Set 1	Set 2	Set 3	Set 4	Set 5
Rabita Baku	AZE	3–0	Dinamo Romprest Bucharest	ROU	25–18	25–16	25–14
Bielsko-Biała	POL	2–3	Scavolini Pesaro	ITA	25–21	12–25	21–25

== Playoffs 12 ==
In case of a tie - 1 match won and 1 match lost and not depending on the final score of both matches - the teams played a golden set to determine which one qualified for the next round.

Team 1	Agg.	Team 2	1st leg	2nd leg
Muszynianka Muszyna (Poland)	5–5^{1}	(Italy) Villa Cortese	3–2	2–3
Modřanská Prostějov (Czech Republic)	3–5^{2}	(Azerbaijan) Rabita Baku	3–2	0–3
Zarechye Odintsovo (Russia)	3–3^{3}	(Switzerland) Voléro Zürich	3–0	0–3
Scavolini Pesaro (Italy)	6–4	(Russia) Dynamo Moscow	3–2	3–2
RC Cannes (France)	0–6	(Turkey) Eczacıbaşı Vitra	0–3	0–3
Bielsko-Biała (Poland)	2–6	(Turkey) VakıfBank Güneş TTelekom	1–3	1–3

^{1}Muszynianka Muszyna won the golden set 15–11.
^{2}Rabita Baku won the golden set 15–11.
^{3}Voléro Zürich won the golden set 15–9.

=== First leg ===
February 1–3, 2011

	Score		Set 1	Set 2	Set 3	Set 4	Set 5
Muszynianka Muszyna	POL	3–2	Villa Cortese	ITA	25–16	26–24	23–25
Modřanská Prostějov	CZE	3–2	Rabita Baku	AZE	19–25	25–21	25–22
Zarechye Odintsovo	RUS	3–0	Voléro Zürich	SUI	25–21	25–15	25–18
Scavolini Pesaro	ITA	3–2	Dynamo Moscow	RUS	19–25	25–14	19–25
RC Cannes	FRA	0–3	Eczacıbaşı Vitra	TUR	20–25	20–25	22–25
Bielsko-Biała	POL	1–3	VakıfBank Güneş TTelekom	TUR	18–25	25–22	18–25

=== Second leg ===
February 8–10, 2011

	Score		Set 1	Set 2	Set 3	Set 4	Set 5
Villa Cortese	ITA	3–2	Muszynianka Muszyna	POL	25–23	18–25	25–19
Rabita Baku	AZE	3–0	Modřanská Prostějov	CZE	25–21	25–23	25–19
Voléro Zürich	SUI	3–0	Zarechye Odintsovo	RUS	25–22	25–22	25–21
Dynamo Moscow	RUS	2–3	Scavolini Pesaro	ITA	17–25	25–19	28–26
Eczacıbaşı Vitra	TUR	3–0	RC Cannes	FRA	25–21	25–14	25–21
VakıfBank Güneş TTelekom	TUR	3–1	Bielsko-Biała	POL	22–25	25–20	25–21

== Playoffs 6 ==
In case of a tie - 1 match won and 1 match lost and not depending on the final score of both matches - the teams have to play a golden set to determine which one qualifies for the next round.

Team 1	Agg.	Team 2	1st leg	2nd leg
Muszynianka Muszyna (Poland)	0–6	(Azerbaijan) Rabita Baku	0–3	0–3
Voléro Zürich (Switzerland)	3–6	(Italy) Scavolini Pesaro	1–3	2–3
Eczacıbaşı Vitra (Turkey)	2–6	(Turkey) VakıfBank Güneş TTelekom	0–3	2–3

=== First leg ===
February 23–24, 2011

	Score		Set 1	Set 2	Set 3	Set 4	Set 5
Muszynianka Muszyna	POL	0–3	Rabita Baku	AZE	23–25	21–25	19–25
Voléro Zürich	SUI	1–3	Scavolini Pesaro	ITA	27–25	20–25	20–25
Eczacıbaşı Vitra	TUR	0–3	VakıfBank Güneş TTelekom	TUR	21–25	20–25	22–25

=== Second leg ===
March 3, 2011

	Score		Set 1	Set 2	Set 3	Set 4	Set 5
Rabita Baku	AZE	3–0	Muszynianka Muszyna	POL	25–20	25–19	25–19
Scavolini Pesaro	ITA	3–2	Voléro Zürich	SUI	25–27	25–18	25–23
VakıfBank Güneş TTelekom	TUR	3–2	Eczacıbaşı Vitra	TUR	21–25	22–25	25–23

== Final four ==
The final four was held at 19–20 March 2011 at Istanbul, Turkey. Fenerbahçe Acıbadem was qualified as the organizer.

=== Bracket ===
Semifinals
2011-03-19 – Istanbul
(Turkey) Fenerbahçe Acıbadem	2
(Turkey) VakıfBank Güneş TTelekom	3
2011-03-19 – Istanbul
(Azerbaijan) Rabita Baku	3
(Italy) Scavolini Pesaro	1

Final
2011-03-20 – Istanbul
(Turkey) VakıfBank Güneş TTelekom	3
(Azerbaijan) Rabita Baku	0
3rd place
2011-03-20 – Istanbul
(Turkey) Fenerbahçe Acıbadem	3
(Italy) Scavolini Pesaro	1

=== Semi-final ===
March 19, 2011

	Score		Set 1	Set 2	Set 3	Set 4	Set 5
Fenerbahçe Acıbadem	TUR	2–3	VakıfBank Güneş TTelekom	TUR	25–19	21–25	25–21
Rabita Baku	AZE	3–1	Scavolini Pesaro	ITA	25–23	25–16	13–25

=== Third-place game ===
March 20, 2011

	Score		Set 1	Set 2	Set 3	Set 4	Set 5
Fenerbahçe Acıbadem	TUR	3–1	Scavolini Pesaro	ITA	12–25	25–21	25–21

=== Final ===
March 20, 2011

	Score		Set 1	Set 2	Set 3	Set 4	Set 5
VakıfBank Güneş TTelekom	TUR	3–0	Rabita Baku	AZE	25–13	25–20	25–18

== Final standing ==
Rank	Team
1st place, gold medalist(s)	(Turkey) VakıfBank Güneş TTelekom
2nd place, silver medalist(s)	(Azerbaijan) Rabita Baku
3rd place, bronze medalist(s)	(Turkey) Fenerbahçe Acıbadem
4	(Italy) Scavolini Pesaro

2010–11 Women's Club European Champions
'
VakıfBank Güneş Sigorta Türk Telekom
1st title'

Roster for Final Four
Gözde Kırdar, Gizem Karadayı, Nilay Karaağaç, Bahanur Şahin, Małgorzata Glinka, Melis Gürkaynak, Özge Kırdar, Güldeniz Önal, Bahar Toksoy, Jelena Nikolić, Seray Altay and Maja Poljak
Head coach
Giovanni Guidetti

== Individual awards ==
Winners:

- MVP: Małgorzata Glinka (POL) / (Turkey) VakıfBank Güneş TTelekom
- Best Blocker:Maja Poljak (CRO) / (Turkey) VakıfBank Güneş TTelekom
- Best Libero: Gizem Güreşen (TUR) / (Turkey) VakıfBank Güneş TTelekom
- Best Receiver:Gözde Kırdar Sonsırma (TUR) / (Turkey) VakıfBank Güneş TTelekom
- Best Scorer:Jelena Nikolić (SRB) / (Turkey) VakıfBank Güneş TTelekom
- Best Server:Natalya Mammadova (AZE) / (Azerbaijan) Rabita Baku
- Best Setter:Özge Kırdar Çemberci (TUR) / (Turkey) VakıfBank Güneş TTelekom
- Best Spiker: Manon Flier (NED) / (Italy) Scavolini Pesaro
