= 2014 FIVB Women's Volleyball World Championship squads =

This article shows the rosters of all participating teams at the 2014 FIVB Women's Volleyball World Championship in Italy.

== Pool A ==
=== Italy ===
The following is the Italian roster in the 2014 FIVB Women's Volleyball World Championship.

Head coach: Marco Bonitta

No.	Name	Date of birth	Height	Weight	Spike	Block	2014 club
1	Paola Cardullo	18 March 1982	1.59 m (5 ft 3 in)	56 kg (123 lb)	275 cm (108 in)	268 cm (106 in)	(Italy) LJ Modena
3	Noemi Signorile	15 February 1990	1.82 m (6 ft 0 in)	74 kg (163 lb)	294 cm (116 in)	290 cm (110 in)	(Italy) AGIL Novara
6	Monica De Gennaro	8 January 1987	1.74 m (5 ft 9 in)	67 kg (148 lb)	292 cm (115 in)	270 cm (110 in)	(Italy) Imoco Conegliano
7	Raphaela Folie	7 March 1991	1.86 m (6 ft 1 in)	82 kg (181 lb)	307 cm (121 in)	283 cm (111 in)	(Italy) LJ Modena
9	Nadia Centoni	19 June 1981	1.82 m (6 ft 0 in)	63 kg (139 lb)	307 cm (121 in)	291 cm (115 in)	(Turkey) Galatasaray
10	Francesca Ferretti	15 February 1984	1.80 m (5 ft 11 in)	70 kg (150 lb)	296 cm (117 in)	280 cm (110 in)	(Azerbaijan) Rabita Baku
11	Cristina Chirichella	10 February 1994	1.95 m (6 ft 5 in)	73 kg (161 lb)	314 cm (124 in)	296 cm (117 in)	(Italy) AGIL Novara
12	Francesca Piccinini (c)	10 January 1979	1.84 m (6 ft 0 in)	71 kg (157 lb)	304 cm (120 in)	279 cm (110 in)	(Italy) LJ Modena
13	Valentina Arrighetti	26 January 1985	1.85 m (6 ft 1 in)	72 kg (159 lb)	318 cm (125 in)	310 cm (120 in)	(Azerbaijan) Lokomotiv Baku
14	Eleonora Lo Bianco	22 December 1979	1.71 m (5 ft 7 in)	67 kg (148 lb)	287 cm (113 in)	273 cm (107 in)	(Turkey) Fenerbahçe
15	Antonella Del Core	5 November 1980	1.80 m (5 ft 11 in)	75 kg (165 lb)	302 cm (119 in)	278 cm (109 in)	(Russia) Dinamo Kazan
16	Caterina Bosetti	2 February 1994	1.79 m (5 ft 10 in)	59 kg (130 lb)	299 cm (118 in)	281 cm (111 in)	(Turkey) Galatasaray
17	Valentina Diouf	10 January 1993	2.02 m (6 ft 8 in)	94 kg (207 lb)	320 cm (130 in)	303 cm (119 in)	(Italy) Yamamay Busto Arsizio
18	Carolina Costagrande	15 October 1980	1.87 m (6 ft 2 in)	90 kg (200 lb)	320 cm (130 in)	310 cm (120 in)	(Turkey) Vakıfbank Istanbul

=== Dominican Republic ===
The following is the Dominican roster in the 2014 FIVB Women's Volleyball World Championship.

Head coach: (Brazil) Marcos Kwiek

No.	Name	Date of birth	Height	Weight	Spike	Block	2014 club
1	Annerys Vargas	7 August 1981	1.96 m (6 ft 5 in)	70 kg (150 lb)	327 cm (129 in)	320 cm (130 in)	(Azerbaijan) Azeryol Baku
4	Marianne Fersola	16 January 1992	1.91 m (6 ft 3 in)	60 kg (130 lb)	315 cm (124 in)	310 cm (120 in)	(Dominican Republic) Mirador
5	Brenda Castillo	5 June 1992	1.67 m (5 ft 6 in)	55 kg (121 lb)	245 cm (96 in)	230 cm (91 in)	(Dominican Republic) San Cristóbal
7	Niverka Marte	19 October 1990	1.78 m (5 ft 10 in)	71 kg (157 lb)	295 cm (116 in)	283 cm (111 in)	(Dominican Republic) Deportivo Nacional
8	Cándida Arias	11 March 1992	1.94 m (6 ft 4 in)	68 kg (150 lb)	320 cm (130 in)	315 cm (124 in)	(Dominican Republic) San Cristóbal
12	Rosalín Ángeles	23 July 1985	1.89 m (6 ft 2 in)	61 kg (134 lb)	310 cm (120 in)	300 cm (120 in)	(Dominican Republic) Deportivo Nacional
14	Prisilla Rivera	29 December 1984	1.83 m (6 ft 0 in)	67 kg (148 lb)	309 cm (122 in)	305 cm (120 in)	(Dominican Republic) San Pedro
16	Yonkaira Peña	10 May 1993	1.90 m (6 ft 3 in)	70 kg (150 lb)	320 cm (130 in)	310 cm (120 in)	(Dominican Republic) Mirador
17	Gina Mambrú	21 January 1986	1.82 m (6 ft 0 in)	65 kg (143 lb)	330 cm (130 in)	315 cm (124 in)	(Dominican Republic) Los Cachorros
18	Bethania de la Cruz (c)	13 May 1987	1.88 m (6 ft 2 in)	70 kg (150 lb)	330 cm (130 in)	320 cm (130 in)	(Dominican Republic) Deportivo Nacional
19	Ana Yorkira Binet	9 February 1992	1.74 m (5 ft 9 in)	58 kg (128 lb)	280 cm (110 in)	260 cm (100 in)	(Dominican Republic) Samaná
20	Brayelin Martínez	11 September 1996	2.00 m (6 ft 7 in)	72 kg (159 lb)	330 cm (130 in)	320 cm (130 in)	(Dominican Republic) Mirador

=== Germany ===
The following is the German roster in the 2014 FIVB Women's Volleyball World Championship.

Head coach: (Italy) Giovanni Guidetti

No.	Name	Date of birth	Height	Weight	Spike	Block	2014 club
1	Lenka Dürr	10 December 1990	1.71 m (5 ft 7 in)	59 kg (130 lb)	280 cm (110 in)	270 cm (110 in)	(Azerbaijan) Azeryol Baku
2	Kathleen Weiß	2 February 1984	1.71 m (5 ft 7 in)	66 kg (146 lb)	290 cm (110 in)	273 cm (107 in)	(Czech Republic) VK Prostějov
3	Louisa Lippmann	23 September 1984	1.91 m (6 ft 3 in)	78 kg (172 lb)	319 cm (126 in)	312 cm (123 in)	(Germany) Dresdner SC
4	Maren Brinker	10 July 1986	1.84 m (6 ft 0 in)	68 kg (150 lb)	303 cm (119 in)	295 cm (116 in)	(Italy) Promoball Flero
6	Jennifer Geerties	5 April 1994	1.84 m (6 ft 0 in)	58 kg (128 lb)	298 cm (117 in)	288 cm (113 in)	(Germany) Schweriner SC
7	Jennifer Pettke	29 May 1989	1.87 m (6 ft 2 in)	71 kg (157 lb)	302 cm (119 in)	290 cm (110 in)	(Germany) VBC Wiesbaden
9	Stefanie Karg	22 October 1986	1.89 m (6 ft 2 in)	74 kg (163 lb)	314 cm (124 in)	299 cm (118 in)	(Czech Republic) VK Prostějov
11	Christiane Fürst	29 March 1985	1.92 m (6 ft 4 in)	76 kg (168 lb)	323 cm (127 in)	307 cm (121 in)	(Turkey) Eczacıbaşı Istanbul
12	Heike Beier	9 December 1983	1.84 m (6 ft 0 in)	73 kg (161 lb)	305 cm (120 in)	293 cm (115 in)	(Poland) BKS Bielsko-Biała
14	Margareta Kozuch (c)	30 October 1986	1.87 m (6 ft 2 in)	70 kg (150 lb)	309 cm (122 in)	297 cm (117 in)	(China) Shanghai
15	Lisa Thomsen	20 August 1985	1.72 m (5 ft 8 in)	68 kg (150 lb)	290 cm (110 in)	285 cm (112 in)	(Azerbaijan) Lokomotiv Baku
18	Wiebke Silge	16 July 1996	1.90 m (6 ft 3 in)	75 kg (165 lb)	302 cm (119 in)	291 cm (115 in)	(Germany) USC Münster
19	Laura Weihenmaier	4 April 1991	1.80 m (5 ft 11 in)	70 kg (150 lb)	297 cm (117 in)	286 cm (113 in)	(Germany) Schweriner SC
20	Mareen Apitz	26 March 1987	1.83 m (6 ft 0 in)	73 kg (161 lb)	295 cm (116 in)	284 cm (112 in)	(France) RC Cannes

=== Argentina ===
The following is the Argentine roster in the 2014 FIVB Women's Volleyball World Championship.

Head coach: Guillermo Orduna

No.	Name	Date of birth	Height	Weight	Spike	Block	2014 club
1	Lucía Gaido	19 January 1988	1.64 m (5 ft 5 in)	53 kg (117 lb)	245 cm (96 in)	244 cm (96 in)	(Romania) Ştiinţa Bacău
2	Tanya Acosta	11 March 1991	1.82 m (6 ft 0 in)	70 kg (150 lb)	287 cm (113 in)	280 cm (110 in)	(Argentina) Gimnasia y Esgrima (LP)
3	Paula Nizetich (c)	27 January 1989	1.81 m (5 ft 11 in)	74 kg (163 lb)	305 cm (120 in)	295 cm (116 in)	(Turkey) Beşiktaş
5	Lucía Fresco	14 May 1991	1.95 m (6 ft 5 in)	92 kg (203 lb)	304 cm (120 in)	290 cm (110 in)	(Germany) SC Potsdam
6	Elina Rodríguez	11 February 1997	1.89 m (6 ft 2 in)	72 kg (159 lb)	300 cm (120 in)	284 cm (112 in)	(Argentina) Americano M. y S.
8	Sol Piccolo	11 September 1996	1.84 m (6 ft 0 in)	74 kg (163 lb)	294 cm (116 in)	282 cm (111 in)	(Argentina) Vélez Sarsfield
10	Emilce Sosa	11 September 1987	1.77 m (5 ft 10 in)	75 kg (165 lb)	305 cm (120 in)	295 cm (116 in)	(Romania) Ştiinţa Bacău
11	Julieta Lazcano	25 July 1989	1.90 m (6 ft 3 in)	74 kg (163 lb)	312 cm (123 in)	293 cm (115 in)	(France) Istres Volley-Ball
12	Tatiana Rizzo	30 December 1986	1.78 m (5 ft 10 in)	64 kg (141 lb)	280 cm (110 in)	268 cm (106 in)	(Argentina) Boca Juniors
13	Leticia Boscacci	8 November 1985	1.86 m (6 ft 1 in)	70 kg (150 lb)	302 cm (119 in)	284 cm (112 in)	(Italy) Volley Soverato
14	Josefina Fernández	17 August 1991	1.75 m (5 ft 9 in)	72 kg (159 lb)	294 cm (116 in)	284 cm (112 in)	(Argentina) Gimnasia y Esgrima (LP)
16	Florencia Busquets	27 June 1989	1.92 m (6 ft 4 in)	68 kg (150 lb)	305 cm (120 in)	290 cm (110 in)	(Romania) CSV Alba-Blaj
17	Antonela Curatola	23 October 1991	1.75 m (5 ft 9 in)	71 kg (157 lb)	290 cm (110 in)	280 cm (110 in)	(Argentina) Vélez Sarsfield
18	Yael Castiglione	27 September 1985	1.84 m (6 ft 0 in)	75 kg (165 lb)	295 cm (116 in)	281 cm (111 in)	(Brazil) Maranhão Vôlei

=== Croatia ===
The following is the Croatian roster in the 2014 FIVB Women's Volleyball World Championship.

Head coach: (Brazil) Angelo Vercesi

No.	Name	Date of birth	Height	Weight	Spike	Block	2014 club
1	Senna Ušić	14 May 1986	1.91 m (6 ft 3 in)	78 kg (172 lb)	302 cm (119 in)	292 cm (115 in)	(Turkey) Eczacıbaşı Istanbul
2	Ana Grbac	23 March 1988	1.87 m (6 ft 2 in)	64 kg (141 lb)	298 cm (117 in)	288 cm (113 in)	(Azerbaijan) Lokomotiv Baku
4	Nikolina Jelić	9 November 1991	1.88 m (6 ft 2 in)	69 kg (152 lb)	254 cm (100 in)	250 cm (98 in)	(Germany) SC Potsdam
5	Antonija Kaleb	2 April 1986	1.88 m (6 ft 2 in)	71 kg (157 lb)	305 cm (120 in)	289 cm (114 in)	(Indonesia) Jakarta BNI 46
7	Bernarda Ćutuk	22 December 1990	1.86 m (6 ft 1 in)	76 kg (168 lb)	317 cm (125 in)	300 cm (120 in)	(Germany) SC Potsdam
8	Mia Jerkov	5 December 1982	1.92 m (6 ft 4 in)	68 kg (150 lb)	310 cm (120 in)	295 cm (116 in)	(Turkey) Bursa Büyükşehir
10	Ivana Miloš	7 March 1986	1.87 m (6 ft 2 in)	70 kg (150 lb)	312 cm (123 in)	296 cm (117 in)	(Italy) AGIL Novara
11	Sanja Popović	31 May 1984	1.86 m (6 ft 1 in)	76 kg (168 lb)	291 cm (115 in)	283 cm (111 in)	(Russia) Dinamo Moscow
13	Samanta Fabris	8 February 1992	1.88 m (6 ft 2 in)	79 kg (174 lb)	322 cm (127 in)	306 cm (120 in)	(Italy) LJ Modena
14	Karla Klarić	5 September 1994	1.88 m (6 ft 2 in)	86 kg (190 lb)	310 cm (120 in)	300 cm (120 in)	(Switzerland) Voléro Zürich
15	Bernarda Brčić	12 May 1991	1.92 m (6 ft 4 in)	81 kg (179 lb)	305 cm (120 in)	297 cm (117 in)	(Italy) Tiboni Urbino
17	Jelena Alajbeg	1 October 1989	1.83 m (6 ft 0 in)	75 kg (165 lb)	310 cm (120 in)	300 cm (120 in)	(Turkey) İller Bankası
18	Maja Poljak (c)	2 May 1983	1.94 m (6 ft 4 in)	80 kg (180 lb)	305 cm (120 in)	300 cm (120 in)	(Turkey) Eczacıbaşı Istanbul
21	Marija Ušić	5 February 1992	1.85 m (6 ft 1 in)	67 kg (148 lb)	292 cm (115 in)	278 cm (109 in)	(France) Amiens LMVB

=== Tunisia ===
The following is the Tunisian roster in the 2014 FIVB Women's Volleyball World Championship.

Head coach: Mohamed Messelmani

No.	Name	Date of birth	Height	Weight	Spike	Block	2014 club
1	Fatma Agrebi	14 September 1990	1.81 m (5 ft 11 in)	78 kg (172 lb)	296 cm (117 in)	275 cm (108 in)	(Tunisia) CF Carthage
2	Chaima Ghobji	22 August 1994	1.77 m (5 ft 10 in)	72 kg (159 lb)	276 cm (109 in)	263 cm (104 in)	(Tunisia) CO Kélibia
4	Meriem Mami	3 October 1985	1.65 m (5 ft 5 in)	74 kg (163 lb)	264 cm (104 in)	250 cm (98 in)	(Tunisia) CF Carthage
5	Nihel Ghoul	2 June 1984	1.79 m (5 ft 10 in)	69 kg (152 lb)	293 cm (115 in)	274 cm (108 in)	(Tunisia) UGS Havre Ocean/HAC
7	Rahma Agrebi	2 November 1990	1.76 m (5 ft 9 in)	72 kg (159 lb)	275 cm (108 in)	260 cm (100 in)	(Tunisia) CF Carthage
8	Kaouthar Jemaii	14 January 1989	1.83 m (6 ft 0 in)	85 kg (187 lb)	278 cm (109 in)	265 cm (104 in)	(Tunisia) CS Sfaxien
9	Maïssa Lengliz	21 August 1989	1.80 m (5 ft 11 in)	65 kg (143 lb)	279 cm (110 in)	270 cm (110 in)	(Tunisia) CF Carthage
10	Maroua Boughanmi	16 March 1992	1.80 m (5 ft 11 in)	64 kg (141 lb)	287 cm (113 in)	267 cm (105 in)	(Tunisia) CF Carthage
11	Meserra Ben Halima	18 August 1983	1.81 m (5 ft 11 in)	76 kg (168 lb)	280 cm (110 in)	268 cm (106 in)	(Tunisia) CS Sfaxien
12	Marwa Barhoumi	28 April 1988	1.74 m (5 ft 9 in)	66 kg (146 lb)	278 cm (109 in)	260 cm (100 in)	(Tunisia) CF Carthage
15	Wafa Mnassar	21 April 1985	1.76 m (5 ft 9 in)	62 kg (137 lb)	263 cm (104 in)	256 cm (101 in)	(Tunisia) US Carthage
16	Mariem Brik (c)	9 December 1980	1.83 m (6 ft 0 in)	77 kg (170 lb)	292 cm (115 in)	274 cm (108 in)	(Tunisia) CF Carthage

== Pool B ==
=== Brazil ===
The following is the Brazilian roster in the 2014 FIVB Women's Volleyball World Championship.

Head coach: José Roberto Guimarães

No.	Name	Date of birth	Height	Weight	Spike	Block	2014 club
1	Fabiana Claudino (c)	24 January 1985	1.93 m (6 ft 4 in)	76 kg (168 lb)	314 cm (124 in)	293 cm (115 in)	(Brazil) SESI-SP
3	Dani Lins	5 January 1985	1.81 m (5 ft 11 in)	68 kg (150 lb)	290 cm (110 in)	276 cm (109 in)	(Brazil) Molico Osasco
4	Ana Carolina da Silva	8 April 1991	1.83 m (6 ft 0 in)	73 kg (161 lb)	290 cm (110 in)	290 cm (110 in)	(Brazil) Unilever Rio de Janeiro
5	Adenízia da Silva	18 December 1986	1.85 m (6 ft 1 in)	63 kg (139 lb)	312 cm (123 in)	290 cm (110 in)	(Brazil) Molico Osasco
6	Thaísa Menezes	15 May 1987	1.96 m (6 ft 5 in)	79 kg (174 lb)	316 cm (124 in)	301 cm (119 in)	(Brazil) Molico Osasco
8	Jaqueline Carvalho	31 December 1983	1.86 m (6 ft 1 in)	70 kg (150 lb)	302 cm (119 in)	286 cm (113 in)	Unnatached
10	Gabriela Guimarães	19 May 1994	1.76 m (5 ft 9 in)	59 kg (130 lb)	295 cm (116 in)	274 cm (108 in)	(Brazil) Unilever Rio de Janeiro
11	Tandara Caixeta	30 October 1988	1.84 m (6 ft 0 in)	87 kg (192 lb)	305 cm (120 in)	297 cm (117 in)	(Brazil) Praia Clube
12	Natália Pereira	4 April 1989	1.83 m (6 ft 0 in)	76 kg (168 lb)	300 cm (120 in)	288 cm (113 in)	(Brazil) Unilever Rio de Janeiro
13	Sheilla Castro	1 July 1983	1.85 m (6 ft 1 in)	64 kg (141 lb)	302 cm (119 in)	284 cm (112 in)	(Turkey) Vakıfbank Istanbul
16	Fernanda Garay	10 May 1986	1.79 m (5 ft 10 in)	74 kg (163 lb)	308 cm (121 in)	288 cm (113 in)	(Russia) Dinamo Krasnodar
17	Fabíola de Souza	3 February 1983	1.84 m (6 ft 0 in)	70 kg (150 lb)	300 cm (120 in)	285 cm (112 in)	(Russia) Dinamo Krasnodar
18	Camila Brait	28 October 1988	1.70 m (5 ft 7 in)	58 kg (128 lb)	271 cm (107 in)	256 cm (101 in)	(Brazil) Molico Osasco
19	Léia Silva	1 March 1985	1.69 m (5 ft 7 in)	58 kg (128 lb)	268 cm (106 in)	254 cm (100 in)	(Brazil) EC Pinheiros

=== Serbia ===
The following is the Serbian roster in the 2014 FIVB Women's Volleyball World Championship.

Head coach: Zoran Terzić

No.	Name	Date of birth	Height	Weight	Spike	Block	2014 club
2	Jovana Brakočević	5 March 1988	1.96 m (6 ft 5 in)	82 kg (181 lb)	309 cm (122 in)	295 cm (116 in)	(Turkey) Vakıfbank Istanbul
4	Bojana Živković	29 March 1988	1.85 m (6 ft 1 in)	70 kg (150 lb)	292 cm (115 in)	284 cm (112 in)	(Turkey) İller Bankası
5	Nataša Krsmanović	19 June 1985	1.88 m (6 ft 2 in)	73 kg (161 lb)	305 cm (120 in)	285 cm (112 in)	(Azerbaijan) Rabita Baku
6	Tijana Malešević	18 March 1991	1.84 m (6 ft 0 in)	73 kg (161 lb)	289 cm (114 in)	288 cm (113 in)	(Czech Republic) VK Prostějov
7	Brižitka Molnar	28 July 1985	1.82 m (6 ft 0 in)	66 kg (146 lb)	304 cm (120 in)	290 cm (110 in)	(Poland) Atom Trefl Sopot
9	Brankica Mihajlović	13 April 1991	1.89 m (6 ft 2 in)	64 kg (141 lb)	282 cm (111 in)	264 cm (104 in)	(Brazil) Unilever Rio de Janeiro
10	Maja Ognjenović (c)	6 August 1984	1.83 m (6 ft 0 in)	68 kg (150 lb)	290 cm (110 in)	270 cm (110 in)	(Poland) KPS Chemik Police
11	Stefana Veljković	9 January 1990	1.90 m (6 ft 3 in)	76 kg (168 lb)	320 cm (130 in)	305 cm (120 in)	(Turkey) Galatasaray
12	Jelena Nikolić	13 April 1982	1.94 m (6 ft 4 in)	79 kg (174 lb)	315 cm (124 in)	300 cm (120 in)	(Turkey) Vakıfbank Istanbul
14	Nađa Ninković	1 November 1991	1.93 m (6 ft 4 in)	77 kg (170 lb)	307 cm (121 in)	298 cm (117 in)	(Switzerland) Voléro Zürich
16	Milena Rašić	25 October 1990	1.93 m (6 ft 4 in)	75 kg (165 lb)	303 cm (119 in)	293 cm (115 in)	(France) RC Cannes
17	Silvija Popović	15 March 1986	1.78 m (5 ft 10 in)	65 kg (143 lb)	236 cm (93 in)	226 cm (89 in)	(Switzerland) Voléro Zürich
18	Suzana Ćebić	9 November 1984	1.67 m (5 ft 6 in)	60 kg (130 lb)	279 cm (110 in)	255 cm (100 in)	(Azerbaijan) Lokomotiv Baku
19	Tijana Bošković	8 March 1997	1.91 m (6 ft 3 in)	71 kg (157 lb)	303 cm (119 in)	295 cm (116 in)	(Serbia) ŽOK Vizura

=== Turkey ===
The following is the Turkish roster in the 2014 FIVB Women's Volleyball World Championship.

Head coach: (Italy) Massimo Barbolini

No.	Name	Date of birth	Height	Weight	Spike	Block	2014 club
1	Güldeniz Önal	25 March 1986	1.82 m (6 ft 0 in)	75 kg (165 lb)	296 cm (117 in)	290 cm (110 in)	(Turkey) Vakıfbank Istanbul
2	Gözde Sonsırma (c)	26 June 1985	1.83 m (6 ft 0 in)	72 kg (159 lb)	297 cm (117 in)	292 cm (115 in)	(Turkey) Vakıfbank Istanbul
3	Gizem Karadayı	14 January 1987	1.78 m (5 ft 10 in)	60 kg (130 lb)	285 cm (112 in)	250 cm (98 in)	(Turkey) Vakıfbank Istanbul
5	Kübra Akman	13 October 1994	1.97 m (6 ft 6 in)	89 kg (196 lb)	310 cm (120 in)	300 cm (120 in)	(Turkey) Vakıfbank Istanbul
6	Polen Uslupehlivan	27 August 1990	1.93 m (6 ft 4 in)	65 kg (143 lb)	308 cm (121 in)	300 cm (120 in)	(Turkey) Vakıfbank Istanbul
7	Seda Tokatlıoğlu	25 June 1986	1.92 m (6 ft 4 in)	80 kg (180 lb)	312 cm (123 in)	304 cm (120 in)	(China) Beijing
8	Bahar Toksoy	6 February 1988	1.90 m (6 ft 3 in)	75 kg (165 lb)	302 cm (119 in)	254 cm (100 in)	(Turkey) Vakıfbank Istanbul
9	Merve Dalbeler	27 June 1987	1.82 m (6 ft 0 in)	73 kg (161 lb)	310 cm (120 in)	300 cm (120 in)	(Turkey) Fenerbahçe
11	Naz Aydemir	14 August 1990	1.86 m (6 ft 1 in)	75 kg (165 lb)	290 cm (110 in)	249 cm (98 in)	(Turkey) Vakıfbank Istanbul
13	Neriman Özsoy	13 July 1988	1.88 m (6 ft 2 in)	76 kg (168 lb)	310 cm (120 in)	291 cm (115 in)	(Italy) Imoco Conegliano
14	Meliha İsmailoğlu	17 September 1993	1.88 m (6 ft 2 in)	70 kg (150 lb)	300 cm (120 in)	297 cm (117 in)	(Turkey) Fenerbahçe
18	Asuman Karakoyun	16 July 1990	1.80 m (5 ft 11 in)	72 kg (159 lb)	300 cm (120 in)	290 cm (110 in)	(Turkey) Eczacıbaşı Istanbul
19	Ceylan Arısan	1 January 1994	1.93 m (6 ft 4 in)	79 kg (174 lb)	317 cm (125 in)	310 cm (120 in)	(Turkey) Eczacıbaşı Istanbul
21	Özgenur Yurtdagülen	6 August 1993	1.90 m (6 ft 3 in)	67 kg (148 lb)	290 cm (110 in)	285 cm (112 in)	(Turkey) Galatasaray

=== Canada ===
The following is the Canadian roster in the 2014 FIVB Women's Volleyball World Championship.

Head coach: (Germany) Arnd Ludwig

No.	Name	Date of birth	Height	Weight	Spike	Block	2014 club
1	Janie Guimond	11 April 1984	1.65 m (5 ft 5 in)	62 kg (137 lb)	288 cm (113 in)	288 cm (113 in)	(France) Terville Florange
2	Lisa Barclay	7 June 1992	1.88 m (6 ft 2 in)	84 kg (185 lb)	316 cm (124 in)	297 cm (117 in)	(Canada) University of British Columbia
3	Brittney Page (c)	4 February 1984	1.84 m (6 ft 0 in)	77 kg (170 lb)	309 cm (122 in)	292 cm (115 in)	(Germany) SC Potsdam
4	Kyla Richey	20 June 1989	1.88 m (6 ft 2 in)	83 kg (183 lb)	309 cm (122 in)	292 cm (115 in)	(Turkey) Yeşilyurt Istanbul
8	Jaimie Thibeault	23 September 1989	1.88 m (6 ft 2 in)	79 kg (174 lb)	302 cm (119 in)	286 cm (113 in)	(Italy) Tiboni Urbino
9	Tabitha Love	11 September 1991	1.96 m (6 ft 5 in)	85 kg (187 lb)	323 cm (127 in)	307 cm (121 in)	(Poland) Budowlani Łódź
10	Marisa Field	10 July 1987	1.89 m (6 ft 2 in)	71 kg (157 lb)	312 cm (123 in)	297 cm (117 in)	(Germany) VfB 91 Suhl
11	Tesca Andrew-Wasylik	11 August 1990	1.73 m (5 ft 8 in)	59 kg (130 lb)	292 cm (115 in)	277 cm (109 in)	Unnatached
14	Lucille Charuk	13 August 1989	1.88 m (6 ft 2 in)	88 kg (194 lb)	315 cm (124 in)	296 cm (117 in)	(Slovenia) Calcit Kamnik
15	Rebecca Pavan	17 April 1990	1.92 m (6 ft 4 in)	67 kg (148 lb)	314 cm (124 in)	300 cm (120 in)	(Germany) VC Stuttgart
17	Megan Cyr	1 June 1990	1.82 m (6 ft 0 in)	75 kg (165 lb)	297 cm (117 in)	282 cm (111 in)	(Germany) VC Stuttgart
18	Shanice Marcelle	28 May 1990	1.80 m (5 ft 11 in)	67 kg (148 lb)	306 cm (120 in)	286 cm (113 in)	(Germany) Dresdner SC
19	Jennifer Lundquist	10 September 1991	1.78 m (5 ft 10 in)	76 kg (168 lb)	300 cm (120 in)	284 cm (112 in)	Unnatached
20	Dana Cranston	5 December 1991	1.91 m (6 ft 3 in)	73 kg (161 lb)	317 cm (125 in)	308 cm (121 in)	(France) Istres Volley-Ball

=== Cameroon ===
The following is the Cameroonian roster in the 2014 FIVB Women's Volleyball World Championship.

Head coach: Jean-René Akono

No.	Name	Date of birth	Height	Weight	Spike	Block	2014 club
1	Stéphanie Fotso Mogoung	25 September 1987	1.87 m (6 ft 2 in)	78 kg (172 lb)	296 cm (117 in)	259 cm (102 in)	(France) VBC Chamalières
2	Christelle Nana Tchoudjang	7 July 1989	1.84 m (6 ft 0 in)	80 kg (180 lb)	295 cm (116 in)	260 cm (100 in)	(France) VBC Chamalières
3	Roline Tatchou Nyoyo	8 July 1985	1.80 m (5 ft 11 in)	92 kg (203 lb)	283 cm (111 in)	250 cm (98 in)	(Cameroon) INJS Yaoundé
4	Fride Mekong à Iroume	8 July 1985	1.74 m (5 ft 9 in)	68 kg (150 lb)	264 cm (104 in)	240 cm (94 in)	(Cameroon) FAP Yaoundé
5	Juliette Asta Gamkoua	30 June 1982	1.80 m (5 ft 11 in)	72 kg (159 lb)	270 cm (110 in)	265 cm (104 in)	(Cameroon) Bafia Evolution
6	Laetitia Moma Bassoko	9 October 1993	1.84 m (6 ft 0 in)	81 kg (179 lb)	312 cm (123 in)	287 cm (113 in)	(France) VBC Chamalières
7	Henriette Koulla	14 September 1992	1.69 m (5 ft 7 in)	60 kg (130 lb)	275 cm (108 in)	262 cm (103 in)	(Cameroon) INJS Yaoundé
8	Esther Eba'a Mballa (c)	11 March 1984	1.78 m (5 ft 10 in)	71 kg (157 lb)	282 cm (111 in)	270 cm (110 in)	(Cameroon) INJS Yaoundé
9	Marthe Bilée Etoga	3 May 1989	1.78 m (5 ft 10 in)	78 kg (172 lb)	276 cm (109 in)	267 cm (105 in)	(Cameroon) Bafia Evolution
10	Berthrade Bikatal	23 July 1992	1.71 m (5 ft 7 in)	66 kg (146 lb)	297 cm (117 in)	271 cm (107 in)	(Cameroon) Nyong-et-Kéllé
11	Victoire L'or Ngon Ntame	31 December 1985	1.77 m (5 ft 10 in)	79 kg (174 lb)	288 cm (113 in)	272 cm (107 in)	(Cameroon) INJS Yaoundé
12	Fawziya Abdoulkarim	1 March 1989	1.76 m (5 ft 9 in)	64 kg (141 lb)	292 cm (115 in)	287 cm (113 in)	(Cameroon) Bafia Evolution
13	Sandrine Magon à Anoko	13 March 1990	1.81 m (5 ft 11 in)	75 kg (165 lb)	297 cm (117 in)	285 cm (112 in)	(Cameroon) INJS Yaoundé
14	Nadine Nyadjo	18 November 1985	1.74 m (5 ft 9 in)	78 kg (172 lb)	275 cm (108 in)	270 cm (110 in)	(Cameroon) Bafia Evolution

=== Bulgaria ===
The following is the Bulgarian roster in the 2014 FIVB Women's Volleyball World Championship.

Head coach: (Russia) Vladimir Kuzyutkin

No.	Name	Date of birth	Height	Weight	Spike	Block	2014 club
1	Diana Nenova	16 April 1985	1.78 m (5 ft 10 in)	70 kg (150 lb)	294 cm (116 in)	298 cm (117 in)	(Romania) Dinamo București
4	Lora Kitipova	19 May 1991	1.84 m (6 ft 0 in)	66 kg (146 lb)	290 cm (110 in)	283 cm (111 in)	(Azerbaijan) Azerrail Baku
5	Dobriana Rabadzhieva	14 June 1991	1.90 m (6 ft 3 in)	72 kg (159 lb)	305 cm (120 in)	285 cm (112 in)	(Switzerland) Voléro Zürich
6	Tsvetelina Zarkova	18 December 1986	1.87 m (6 ft 2 in)	69 kg (152 lb)	298 cm (117 in)	289 cm (114 in)	(Romania) Dinamo București
10	Kremena Kamenova	21 May 1988	1.85 m (6 ft 1 in)	64 kg (141 lb)	304 cm (120 in)	299 cm (118 in)	(Romania) CSM București
11	Hristina Ruseva	1 October 1991	1.90 m (6 ft 3 in)	77 kg (170 lb)	305 cm (120 in)	290 cm (110 in)	(Italy) LJ Modena
12	Ivelina Monova	17 January 1986	1.73 m (5 ft 8 in)	58 kg (128 lb)	285 cm (112 in)	280 cm (110 in)	(Bulgaria) Maritza Plovdiv
13	Mariya Filipova	10 September 1982	1.78 m (5 ft 10 in)	68 kg (150 lb)	295 cm (116 in)	275 cm (108 in)	(Romania) Metal Galați
14	Slavina Koleva	22 November 1986	1.84 m (6 ft 0 in)	57 kg (126 lb)	302 cm (119 in)	297 cm (117 in)	(Turkey) Karşıyaka Izmir
15	Nasya Dimitrova	6 November 1992	1.90 m (6 ft 3 in)	70 kg (150 lb)	305 cm (120 in)	290 cm (110 in)	(Bulgaria) Levski Sofia
16	Elitsa Vasileva	13 May 1990	1.94 m (6 ft 4 in)	73 kg (161 lb)	302 cm (119 in)	290 cm (110 in)	(Turkey) Vakıfbank Istanbul
17	Strashimira Filipova (c)	18 August 1985	1.95 m (6 ft 5 in)	78 kg (172 lb)	307 cm (121 in)	300 cm (120 in)	(Russia) Fakel Novy Urengoy
18	Emiliya Nikolova	26 December 1991	1.85 m (6 ft 1 in)	59 kg (130 lb)	302 cm (119 in)	287 cm (113 in)	(Italy) Imoco Conegliano
19	Elena Koleva	1 December 1977	1.86 m (6 ft 1 in)	75 kg (165 lb)	304 cm (120 in)	298 cm (117 in)	(Italy) River Piacenza

== Pool C ==
=== United States ===
The following is the American roster in the 2014 FIVB Women's Volleyball World Championship.

Head coach: Karch Kiraly

No.	Name	Date of birth	Height	Weight	Spike	Block	2014 club
1	Alisha Glass	5 April 1988	1.84 m (6 ft 0 in)	72 kg (159 lb)	305 cm (120 in)	300 cm (120 in)	(Turkey) Fenerbahçe
2	Kayla Banwarth	21 January 1989	1.78 m (5 ft 10 in)	75 kg (165 lb)	295 cm (116 in)	283 cm (111 in)	(Azerbaijan) Rabita Baku
3	Courtney Thompson	4 November 1984	1.70 m (5 ft 7 in)	66 kg (146 lb)	276 cm (109 in)	263 cm (104 in)	(Switzerland) Voléro Zürich
6	Nicole Davis	24 April 1982	1.67 m (5 ft 6 in)	73 kg (161 lb)	284 cm (112 in)	266 cm (105 in)	(Romania) Dinamo București
9	Kristin Hildebrand	30 June 1985	1.85 m (6 ft 1 in)	68 kg (150 lb)	300 cm (120 in)	284 cm (112 in)	(Brazil) Amil Campinas
10	Jordan Larson	16 October 1986	1.88 m (6 ft 2 in)	75 kg (165 lb)	302 cm (119 in)	295 cm (116 in)	(Russia) Dinamo Kazan
12	Kelly Murphy	20 October 1989	1.88 m (6 ft 2 in)	79 kg (174 lb)	315 cm (124 in)	307 cm (121 in)	(Italy) AGIL Novara
13	Christa Harmotto (c)	12 October 1986	1.88 m (6 ft 2 in)	79 kg (174 lb)	322 cm (127 in)	300 cm (120 in)	(Turkey) Eczacıbaşı Istanbul
14	Nicole Fawcett	16 December 1986	1.91 m (6 ft 3 in)	82 kg (181 lb)	310 cm (120 in)	291 cm (115 in)	(Puerto Rico) Leonas de Ponce
15	Kimberly Hill	30 November 1989	1.93 m (6 ft 4 in)	72 kg (159 lb)	320 cm (130 in)	310 cm (120 in)	(Poland) Atom Trefl Sopot
16	Foluke Akinradewo	5 October 1987	1.91 m (6 ft 3 in)	79 kg (174 lb)	331 cm (130 in)	300 cm (120 in)	(Azerbaijan) Rabita Baku
19	Kelsey Robinson	25 June 1992	1.88 m (6 ft 2 in)	75 kg (165 lb)	306 cm (120 in)	300 cm (120 in)	Unnatached
21	TeTori Dixon	4 August 1992	1.91 m (6 ft 3 in)	83 kg (183 lb)	306 cm (120 in)	295 cm (116 in)	(Azerbaijan) Rabita Baku
22	Rachael Adams	3 June 1990	1.88 m (6 ft 2 in)	81 kg (179 lb)	318 cm (125 in)	307 cm (121 in)	(Poland) MKS Dąbrowa Górnicza

=== Russia ===
The following is the Russian roster in the 2014 FIVB Women's Volleyball World Championship.

Head coach: Yuri Marichev

No.	Name	Date of birth	Height	Weight	Spike	Block	2014 club
1	Yana Shcherban	6 September 1989	1.85 m (6 ft 1 in)	71 kg (157 lb)	298 cm (117 in)	294 cm (116 in)	(Russia) Dinamo Krasnodar
4	Irina Zaryazhko	4 October 1991	1.96 m (6 ft 5 in)	78 kg (172 lb)	305 cm (120 in)	290 cm (110 in)	(Russia) Uralochka Yekaterinburg
5	Aleksandra Pasynkova	14 April 1987	1.90 m (6 ft 3 in)	75 kg (165 lb)	313 cm (123 in)	305 cm (120 in)	(Russia) Dinamo Krasnodar
7	Svetlana Kryuchkova	21 February 1985	1.74 m (5 ft 9 in)	63 kg (139 lb)	290 cm (110 in)	286 cm (113 in)	(Russia) Dinamo Krasnodar
8	Nataliya Goncharova	1 June 1989	1.96 m (6 ft 5 in)	75 kg (165 lb)	315 cm (124 in)	306 cm (120 in)	(Russia) Dinamo Moscow
10	Ekaterina Kosianenko (c)	2 February 1990	1.78 m (5 ft 10 in)	64 kg (141 lb)	290 cm (110 in)	285 cm (112 in)	(Russia) Zarechie Odintsovo
11	Ekaterina Gamova	17 October 1980	2.02 m (6 ft 8 in)	80 kg (180 lb)	321 cm (126 in)	310 cm (120 in)	(Russia) Dinamo Kazan
13	Evgeniya Startseva	12 February 1989	1.85 m (6 ft 1 in)	68 kg (150 lb)	294 cm (116 in)	290 cm (110 in)	(Russia) Dinamo Kazan
14	Irina Fetisova	7 September 1994	1.90 m (6 ft 3 in)	76 kg (168 lb)	307 cm (121 in)	286 cm (113 in)	(Russia) Zarechie Odintsovo
15	Tatiana Kosheleva	23 December 1988	1.91 m (6 ft 3 in)	67 kg (148 lb)	315 cm (124 in)	305 cm (120 in)	(Russia) Dinamo Moscow
16	Yuliya Podskalnaya	18 April 1989	1.90 m (6 ft 3 in)	75 kg (165 lb)	306 cm (120 in)	295 cm (116 in)	(Russia) Dinamo Krasnodar
17	Natalia Malykh	8 December 1993	1.87 m (6 ft 2 in)	65 kg (143 lb)	308 cm (121 in)	297 cm (117 in)	(Russia) Zarechie Odintsovo
19	Anna Malova	16 April 1990	1.75 m (5 ft 9 in)	59 kg (130 lb)	286 cm (113 in)	290 cm (110 in)	(Russia) Dinamo Moscow
22	Regina Moroz	14 January 1987	1.88 m (6 ft 2 in)	70 kg (150 lb)	310 cm (120 in)	303 cm (119 in)	(Russia) Dinamo Kazan

=== Thailand ===
The following is the Thai roster in the 2014 FIVB Women's Volleyball World Championship.

Head coach: Kiattipong Radchatagriengkai

No.	Name	Date of birth	Height	Weight	Spike	Block	2014 club
1	Wanna Buakaew	2 January 1981	1.72 m (5 ft 8 in)	54 kg (119 lb)	292 cm (115 in)	277 cm (109 in)	(Thailand) Nakhonnon
3	Yupa Sanitklang	14 August 1991	1.66 m (5 ft 5 in)	60 kg (130 lb)	275 cm (108 in)	260 cm (100 in)	(Thailand) Ayutthaya A.T.C.C
7	Hattaya Bamrungsuk	12 August 1993	1.78 m (5 ft 10 in)	70 kg (150 lb)	290 cm (110 in)	280 cm (110 in)	(Thailand) Nakhon Ratchasima
8	Sineenat Phocharoen	19 May 1995	1.73 m (5 ft 8 in)	53 kg (117 lb)	287 cm (113 in)	270 cm (110 in)	(Thailand) Sisaket
9	Chatchu-on Moksri	6 November 1999	1.75 m (5 ft 9 in)	63 kg (139 lb)	285 cm (112 in)	275 cm (108 in)	(Thailand) Ayutthaya A.T.C.C
11	Wanitchaya Luangtonglang	8 October 1992	1.77 m (5 ft 10 in)	60 kg (130 lb)	300 cm (120 in)	275 cm (108 in)	(Thailand) Nakhon Ratchasima
14	Jarasporn Bundasak	1 March 1993	1.80 m (5 ft 11 in)	66 kg (146 lb)	290 cm (110 in)	280 cm (110 in)	(Thailand) Nakhon Ratchasima
16	Pornpun Guedpard (c)	5 May 1993	1.70 m (5 ft 7 in)	63 kg (139 lb)	270 cm (110 in)	267 cm (105 in)	(Thailand) Sisaket
17	Kuttika Kaewpin	16 August 1994	1.68 m (5 ft 6 in)	56 kg (123 lb)	285 cm (112 in)	268 cm (106 in)	(Thailand) Nakhonnon
18	Ajcharaporn Kongyot	18 June 1995	1.80 m (5 ft 11 in)	66 kg (146 lb)	290 cm (110 in)	284 cm (112 in)	(Thailand) Supreme Chonburi
19	Kannika Thipachot	3 May 1993	1.67 m (5 ft 6 in)	67 kg (148 lb)	285 cm (112 in)	273 cm (107 in)	(Thailand) Ayutthaya A.T.C.C
20	Soraya Phomla	6 August 1992	1.69 m (5 ft 7 in)	60 kg (130 lb)	280 cm (110 in)	270 cm (110 in)	(Thailand) Ayutthaya A.T.C.C

=== Netherlands ===
The following is the Dutch roster in the 2014 FIVB Women's Volleyball World Championship.

Head coach: Gido Vermeulen

No.	Name	Date of birth	Height	Weight	Spike	Block	2014 club
2	Femke Stoltenborg	30 July 1991	1.90 m (6 ft 3 in)	79 kg (174 lb)	303 cm (119 in)	299 cm (118 in)	(Germany) Alemannia Aachen
3	Yvon Belien	28 December 1993	1.88 m (6 ft 2 in)	73 kg (161 lb)	307 cm (121 in)	303 cm (119 in)	(Germany) Alemannia Aachen
4	Celeste Plak	26 October 1995	1.90 m (6 ft 3 in)	84 kg (185 lb)	314 cm (124 in)	302 cm (119 in)	(Netherlands) Alterno Apeldoorn
5	Robin de Kruijf (c)	5 May 1991	1.93 m (6 ft 4 in)	79 kg (174 lb)	313 cm (123 in)	300 cm (120 in)	(Italy) River Piacenza
7	Quinta Steenbergen	2 April 1985	1.89 m (6 ft 2 in)	74 kg (163 lb)	309 cm (122 in)	300 cm (120 in)	(Czech Republic) VK Prostějov
8	Judith Pietersen	3 July 1989	1.88 m (6 ft 2 in)	73 kg (161 lb)	306 cm (120 in)	296 cm (117 in)	(Poland) Atom Trefl Sopot
9	Myrthe Schoot	29 August 1988	1.84 m (6 ft 0 in)	69 kg (152 lb)	298 cm (117 in)	286 cm (113 in)	(Germany) Dresdner SC
10	Lonneke Slöetjes	15 November 1990	1.92 m (6 ft 4 in)	76 kg (168 lb)	322 cm (127 in)	315 cm (124 in)	(Italy) Yamamay Busto Arsizio
11	Anne Buijs	2 December 1991	1.91 m (6 ft 3 in)	75 kg (165 lb)	317 cm (125 in)	299 cm (118 in)	(Italy) Yamamay Busto Arsizio
12	Manon Flier	8 February 1984	1.92 m (6 ft 4 in)	70 kg (150 lb)	315 cm (124 in)	301 cm (119 in)	(Azerbaijan) Igtisadchi Baku
14	Laura Dijkema	18 February 1990	1.84 m (6 ft 0 in)	70 kg (150 lb)	293 cm (115 in)	279 cm (110 in)	(Turkey) Halkbank Ankara
16	Kirsten Knip	14 September 1992	1.76 m (5 ft 9 in)	73 kg (161 lb)	281 cm (111 in)	275 cm (108 in)	(Netherlands) Sliedrecht Sport
17	Carlijn Jans	24 July 1987	1.92 m (6 ft 4 in)	77 kg (170 lb)	310 cm (120 in)	301 cm (119 in)	(Netherlands) Alterno Apeldoorn
20	Quirine Oosterveld	5 March 1990	1.81 m (5 ft 11 in)	71 kg (157 lb)	296 cm (117 in)	288 cm (113 in)	(Netherlands) Alterno Apeldoorn

=== Kazakhstan ===
The following is the Kazakhstani roster in the 2014 FIVB Women's Volleyball World Championship.

Head coach: (Ukraine) Oleksandr Gutor

No.	Name	Date of birth	Height	Weight	Spike	Block	2014 club
1	Tatyana Mudritskaya	17 January 1985	1.95 m (6 ft 5 in)	77 kg (170 lb)	310 cm (120 in)	300 cm (120 in)	(Germany) Schweriner SC
2	Lyudmila Issayeva	26 September 1989	1.84 m (6 ft 0 in)	70 kg (150 lb)	295 cm (116 in)	280 cm (110 in)	(Kazakhstan) Zhetysu Almaty
3	Sana Anarkulova	21 July 1989	1.88 m (6 ft 2 in)	77 kg (170 lb)	300 cm (120 in)	280 cm (110 in)	(Kazakhstan) Zhetysu Almaty
4	Lyudmila Anarbayeva	12 November 1983	1.92 m (6 ft 4 in)	72 kg (159 lb)	305 cm (120 in)	299 cm (118 in)	(Kazakhstan) Zhetysu Almaty
5	Olga Nassedkina	28 December 1982	1.90 m (6 ft 3 in)	75 kg (165 lb)	305 cm (120 in)	255 cm (100 in)	(Kazakhstan) Zhetysu Almaty
7	Alena Omelchenko	19 June 1989	1.95 m (6 ft 5 in)	78 kg (172 lb)	310 cm (120 in)	300 cm (120 in)	(Kazakhstan) Zhetysu Almaty
8	Korinna Ishimtseva (c)	8 February 1984	1.87 m (6 ft 2 in)	69 kg (152 lb)	300 cm (120 in)	280 cm (110 in)	(Kazakhstan) Zhetysu Almaty
9	Irina Lukomskaya	19 March 1991	1.76 m (5 ft 9 in)	66 kg (146 lb)	280 cm (110 in)	270 cm (110 in)	(Kazakhstan) Zhetysu Almaty
11	Marina Storozhenko	6 June 1985	1.75 m (5 ft 9 in)	57 kg (126 lb)	290 cm (110 in)	280 cm (110 in)	(Kazakhstan) Zhetysu Almaty
12	Inna German	17 January 1983	1.82 m (6 ft 0 in)	75 kg (165 lb)	300 cm (120 in)	280 cm (110 in)	(Kazakhstan) VK Qarağandı
13	Radmila Beresneva	6 June 1983	1.85 m (6 ft 1 in)	70 kg (150 lb)	300 cm (120 in)	295 cm (116 in)	(Kazakhstan) Irtysh Kazchrome
14	Yana Yagodina	24 January 1993	1.82 m (6 ft 0 in)	69 kg (152 lb)	300 cm (120 in)	285 cm (112 in)	(Kazakhstan) Zhetysu Almaty
16	Inna Matveyeva	12 October 1978	1.86 m (6 ft 1 in)	70 kg (150 lb)	303 cm (119 in)	294 cm (116 in)	(Kazakhstan) Irtysh Kazchrome
20	Tatyana Fendrikova	23 February 1990	1.69 m (5 ft 7 in)	55 kg (121 lb)	280 cm (110 in)	275 cm (108 in)	(Kazakhstan) Zhetysu Almaty

=== Mexico ===
The following is the Mexican roster in the 2014 FIVB Women's Volleyball World Championship.

Head coach: Jorge Azair

No.	Name	Date of birth	Height	Weight	Spike	Block	2014 club
1	Gema León	11 March 1991	1.81 m (5 ft 11 in)	61 kg (134 lb)	292 cm (115 in)	275 cm (108 in)	(Mexico) Nuevo León
2	Lizeth López	14 May 1990	1.64 m (5 ft 5 in)	62 kg (137 lb)	277 cm (109 in)	252 cm (99 in)	(Mexico) Baja California
3	Claudia Reséndiz	21 May 1994	1.72 m (5 ft 8 in)	72 kg (159 lb)	268 cm (106 in)	260 cm (100 in)	Unnatached
5	Andrea Rangel (c)	19 May 1993	1.80 m (5 ft 11 in)	57 kg (126 lb)	297 cm (117 in)	289 cm (114 in)	(Mexico) Nuevo León
8	Dulce Carranza	29 June 1990	1.78 m (5 ft 10 in)	83 kg (183 lb)	275 cm (108 in)	252 cm (99 in)	(Mexico) Nuevo León
9	Alejandra Segura	9 November 1993	1.77 m (5 ft 10 in)	69 kg (152 lb)			(Mexico) Nuevo León
10	Lizbeth Sainz	14 December 1995	1.78 m (5 ft 10 in)	55 kg (121 lb)	295 cm (116 in)	285 cm (112 in)	(Mexico) Baja California
13	Marion Frías	19 January 1982	1.91 m (6 ft 3 in)	105 kg (231 lb)	305 cm (120 in)	296 cm (117 in)	(Mexico) Distrito Federal
14	Claudia Ríos	22 September 1992	1.74 m (5 ft 9 in)	54 kg (119 lb)	282 cm (111 in)	262 cm (103 in)	(Mexico) Tamaulipas
15	Jocelyn Urías	16 February 1996	1.90 m (6 ft 3 in)	65 kg (143 lb)	296 cm (117 in)	284 cm (112 in)	(Mexico) Baja California
17	Zaira Orellana	3 May 1989	1.83 m (6 ft 0 in)	63 kg (139 lb)	295 cm (116 in)	287 cm (113 in)	(Mexico) Jalisco
18	Jazmin Hernández	18 September 1989	1.75 m (5 ft 9 in)	70 kg (150 lb)	295 cm (116 in)	287 cm (113 in)	(Mexico) Nuevo León
20	Ana Valle	31 May 1996	1.94 m (6 ft 4 in)	89 kg (196 lb)	310 cm (120 in)	297 cm (117 in)	(Mexico) Distrito Federal
21	Kaomi Solís	6 August 1994	1.60 m (5 ft 3 in)	56 kg (123 lb)	250 cm (98 in)	240 cm (94 in)	(Mexico) Colima

== Pool D ==
=== Japan ===
The following is the Japanese roster in the 2014 FIVB Women's Volleyball World Championship.

Head coach: Masayoshi Manabe

No.	Name	Date of birth	Height	Weight	Spike	Block	2014 club
1	Miyu Nagaoka	27 July 1991	1.79 m (5 ft 10 in)	65 kg (143 lb)	310 cm (120 in)	295 cm (116 in)	(Japan) Hisamitsu Springs
2	Hitomi Nakamichi	18 September 1985	1.59 m (5 ft 3 in)	53 kg (117 lb)	270 cm (110 in)	256 cm (101 in)	(Japan) Toray Arrows
3	Saori Kimura (c)	16 August 1986	1.85 m (6 ft 1 in)	65 kg (143 lb)	304 cm (120 in)	293 cm (115 in)	(Japan) Toray Arrows
4	Arisa Takada	17 February 1987	1.75 m (5 ft 9 in)	64 kg (141 lb)	290 cm (110 in)	275 cm (108 in)	(Japan) Toray Arrows
5	Arisa Satō	18 July 1989	1.64 m (5 ft 5 in)	53 kg (117 lb)	275 cm (108 in)	268 cm (106 in)	(Japan) Hitachi Rivale
7	Mai Yamaguchi	3 July 1983	1.76 m (5 ft 9 in)	62 kg (137 lb)	302 cm (119 in)	290 cm (110 in)	(Japan) Okayama Seagulls
9	Mizuho Ishida	22 January 1988	1.74 m (5 ft 9 in)	67 kg (148 lb)	301 cm (119 in)	280 cm (110 in)	(Japan) Denso Airybees
12	Yuki Ishii	8 May 1991	1.80 m (5 ft 11 in)	68 kg (150 lb)	303 cm (119 in)	286 cm (113 in)	(Japan) Hisamitsu Springs
13	Risa Shinnabe	11 July 1990	1.73 m (5 ft 8 in)	66 kg (146 lb)	295 cm (116 in)	268 cm (106 in)	(Japan) Hisamitsu Springs
14	Yukiko Ebata	7 November 1989	1.76 m (5 ft 9 in)	67 kg (148 lb)	305 cm (120 in)	298 cm (117 in)	(France) RC Cannes
16	Saori Sakoda	18 December 1987	1.75 m (5 ft 9 in)	64 kg (141 lb)	305 cm (120 in)	279 cm (110 in)	(Japan) Toray Arrows
17	Kana Ōno	30 June 1992	1.80 m (5 ft 11 in)	70 kg (150 lb)	297 cm (117 in)	283 cm (111 in)	(Japan) NEC Red Rockets
18	Sayaka Tsutsui	29 September 1992	1.57 m (5 ft 2 in)	54 kg (119 lb)	260 cm (100 in)	250 cm (98 in)	(Japan) Hisamitsu Springs
19	Haruka Miyashita	1 September 1994	1.77 m (5 ft 10 in)	61 kg (134 lb)	298 cm (117 in)	272 cm (107 in)	(Japan) Okayama Seagulls

=== China ===
The following is the Chinese roster in the 2014 FIVB Women's Volleyball World Championship.

Head coach: Lang Ping

No.	Name	Date of birth	Height	Weight	Spike	Block	2014 club
1	Yuan Xinyue	21 December 1996	1.99 m (6 ft 6 in)	78 kg (172 lb)	317 cm (125 in)	311 cm (122 in)	(China) Bayi
2	Zhu Ting	29 November 1994	1.95 m (6 ft 5 in)	78 kg (172 lb)	327 cm (129 in)	300 cm (120 in)	(China) Henan
3	Yang Fangxu	6 October 1994	1.90 m (6 ft 3 in)	71 kg (157 lb)	308 cm (121 in)	300 cm (120 in)	(China) Shandong
5	Shen Jingsi	3 May 1989	1.86 m (6 ft 1 in)	75 kg (165 lb)	305 cm (120 in)	294 cm (116 in)	(China) Bayi
6	Yang Junjing	15 May 1989	1.90 m (6 ft 3 in)	70 kg (150 lb)	308 cm (121 in)	300 cm (120 in)	(China) Bayi
7	Wei Qiuyue	26 September 1988	1.82 m (6 ft 0 in)	65 kg (143 lb)	305 cm (120 in)	300 cm (120 in)	(China) Tianjin
8	Zeng Chunlei	3 November 1989	1.87 m (6 ft 2 in)	67 kg (148 lb)	315 cm (124 in)	315 cm (124 in)	(China) Beijing
9	Liu Xiaotong	19 February 1990	1.88 m (6 ft 2 in)	70 kg (150 lb)	312 cm (123 in)	300 cm (120 in)	(China) Beijing
10	Shan Danna	8 October 1991	1.68 m (5 ft 6 in)	60 kg (130 lb)	290 cm (110 in)	285 cm (112 in)	(China) Zhejiang
11	Xu Yunli	2 August 1987	1.95 m (6 ft 5 in)	75 kg (165 lb)	325 cm (128 in)	306 cm (120 in)	(China) Fujian
12	Hui Ruoqi (c)	4 March 1991	1.92 m (6 ft 4 in)	78 kg (172 lb)	315 cm (124 in)	305 cm (120 in)	(China) Guangdong Evergrande
15	Chen Zhan	11 October 1990	1.80 m (5 ft 11 in)	65 kg (143 lb)	300 cm (120 in)	295 cm (116 in)	(China) Jiangsu
16	Wang Huimin	11 November 1992	1.84 m (6 ft 0 in)	65 kg (143 lb)	305 cm (120 in)	298 cm (117 in)	(China) Zhejiang
17	Wang Na	25 February 1990	1.78 m (5 ft 10 in)	63 kg (139 lb)	305 cm (120 in)	295 cm (116 in)	(China) Zhejiang

=== Puerto Rico ===
The following is the Puerto Rican roster in the 2014 FIVB Women's Volleyball World Championship.

Head coach: José Mieles

No.	Name	Date of birth	Height	Weight	Spike	Block	2014 club
1	Debora Seilhamer	4 October 1985	1.66 m (5 ft 5 in)	61 kg (134 lb)	245 cm (96 in)	240 cm (94 in)	(Puerto Rico) Lancheras de Cataño
2	Shara Venegas	18 September 1992	1.73 m (5 ft 8 in)	68 kg (150 lb)	280 cm (110 in)	272 cm (107 in)	(Puerto Rico) Criollas de Caguas
3	Vilmarie Mojica	13 August 1985	1.80 m (5 ft 11 in)	63 kg (139 lb)	295 cm (116 in)	288 cm (113 in)	(Puerto Rico) Criollas de Caguas
6	Yarimar Rosa (c)	20 June 1988	1.78 m (5 ft 10 in)	62 kg (137 lb)	295 cm (116 in)	285 cm (112 in)	(Puerto Rico) Indias de Mayagüez
7	Stephanie Enright	15 December 1990	1.79 m (5 ft 10 in)	56 kg (123 lb)	300 cm (120 in)	292 cm (115 in)	(Puerto Rico) Criollas de Caguas
9	Áurea Cruz	10 January 1982	1.80 m (5 ft 11 in)	63 kg (139 lb)	310 cm (120 in)	290 cm (110 in)	(Puerto Rico) Gigantes de Carolina
11	Karina Ocasio	1 August 1985	1.92 m (6 ft 4 in)	76 kg (168 lb)	298 cm (117 in)	288 cm (113 in)	(Puerto Rico) Criollas de Caguas
14	Natalia Valentín	12 September 1989	1.70 m (5 ft 7 in)	61 kg (134 lb)	244 cm (96 in)	240 cm (94 in)	(Puerto Rico) Leonas de Ponce
16	Alexandra Oquendo	3 February 1984	1.89 m (6 ft 2 in)	75 kg (165 lb)	297 cm (117 in)	284 cm (112 in)	(Puerto Rico) Criollas de Caguas
17	Sheila Ocasio	17 November 1982	1.95 m (6 ft 5 in)	74 kg (163 lb)	310 cm (120 in)	292 cm (115 in)	(Puerto Rico) Valencianas de Juncos
18	Lynda Morales	20 May 1988	1.88 m (6 ft 2 in)	94 kg (207 lb)	302 cm (119 in)	296 cm (117 in)	(Puerto Rico) Mets de Guaynabo
20	Vanessa Vélez	29 August 1989	1.80 m (5 ft 11 in)	68 kg (150 lb)	292 cm (115 in)	280 cm (110 in)	(Puerto Rico) Gigantes de Carolina

=== Cuba ===
The following is the Cuban roster in the 2014 FIVB Women's Volleyball World Championship.

Head coach: Juan Carlos Gala

No.	Name	Date of birth	Height	Weight	Spike	Block	2014 club
2	Regla Gracia	28 May 1993	1.77 m (5 ft 10 in)	67 kg (148 lb)	301 cm (119 in)	282 cm (111 in)	(Cuba) Camagüey
3	Alena Rojas	9 August 1992	1.86 m (6 ft 1 in)	76 kg (168 lb)	320 cm (130 in)	305 cm (120 in)	(Cuba) La Habana
4	Melissa Vargas	16 October 1999	1.84 m (6 ft 0 in)	78 kg (172 lb)	244 cm (96 in)	242 cm (95 in)	(Cuba) Cienfuegos
5	Yamila Hernández	8 November 1992	1.82 m (6 ft 0 in)	69 kg (152 lb)	301 cm (119 in)	285 cm (112 in)	(Cuba) La Habana
6	Daymara Lescay	5 September 1992	1.84 m (6 ft 0 in)	72 kg (159 lb)	308 cm (121 in)	290 cm (110 in)	(Cuba) Guantanamo
10	Emily Borrell	19 February 1992	1.67 m (5 ft 6 in)	55 kg (121 lb)	270 cm (110 in)	260 cm (100 in)	(Cuba) Villa Clara
11	Gretell Moreno	30 January 1998	1.83 m (6 ft 0 in)	68 kg (150 lb)	287 cm (113 in)	280 cm (110 in)	(Cuba) Granma
12	Dairilys Cruz	12 September 1990	1.83 m (6 ft 0 in)	65 kg (143 lb)	310 cm (120 in)	305 cm (120 in)	(Cuba) Villa Clara
14	Dayami Sánchez	14 March 1994	1.88 m (6 ft 2 in)	64 kg (141 lb)	314 cm (124 in)	302 cm (119 in)	(Cuba) La Habana
17	Heidy Casanova	6 November 1998	1.84 m (6 ft 0 in)	78 kg (172 lb)	244 cm (96 in)	240 cm (94 in)	(Cuba) La Habana
18	Sulian Matienzo (c)	14 December 1994	1.78 m (5 ft 10 in)	75 kg (165 lb)	232 cm (91 in)	230 cm (91 in)	(Cuba) La Habana
19	Jennifer Álvarez	19 November 1993	1.84 m (6 ft 0 in)	72 kg (159 lb)	310 cm (120 in)	294 cm (116 in)	(Cuba) Cienfuegos

=== Belgium ===
The following is the Belgian roster in the 2014 FIVB Women's Volleyball World Championship.

Head coach: Gert Vande Broek

No.	Name	Date of birth	Height	Weight	Spike	Block	2014 club
1	Angie Bland	26 April 1984	1.87 m (6 ft 2 in)	65 kg (143 lb)	306 cm (120 in)	298 cm (117 in)	(France) Volley-Ball Nantes
3	Frauke Dirickx	3 January 1980	1.86 m (6 ft 1 in)	74 kg (163 lb)	305 cm (120 in)	302 cm (119 in)	(Poland) Impel Wrocław
4	Nina Coolman	25 January 1991	1.80 m (5 ft 11 in)	70 kg (150 lb)	305 cm (120 in)	293 cm (115 in)	(France) Saint-Cloud Paris
5	Laura Heyrman	17 May 1993	1.86 m (6 ft 1 in)	73 kg (161 lb)	310 cm (120 in)	280 cm (110 in)	(Italy) LJ Modena
6	Charlotte Leys (c)	18 March 1989	1.84 m (6 ft 0 in)	78 kg (172 lb)	305 cm (120 in)	293 cm (115 in)	(Poland) Atom Trefl Sopot
7	Valérie Courtois	1 November 1990	1.71 m (5 ft 7 in)	66 kg (146 lb)	280 cm (110 in)	270 cm (110 in)	(Belgium) VC Oudegem
10	Lise Van Hecke	1 July 1992	1.86 m (6 ft 1 in)	70 kg (150 lb)	299 cm (118 in)	281 cm (111 in)	(Italy) River Piacenza
11	Els Vandesteene	30 May 1987	1.84 m (6 ft 0 in)	70 kg (150 lb)	308 cm (121 in)	291 cm (115 in)	(France) Volley-Ball Nantes
12	Dominika Strumilo	26 December 1996	1.86 m (6 ft 1 in)	66 kg (146 lb)	311 cm (122 in)	292 cm (115 in)	(Belgium) Asterix Kieldrecht
14	Hélène Rousseaux	25 September 1991	1.87 m (6 ft 2 in)	70 kg (150 lb)	322 cm (127 in)	300 cm (120 in)	(Italy) LJ Modena
17	Ilka Van de Vyver	26 January 1993	1.79 m (5 ft 10 in)	73 kg (161 lb)	296 cm (117 in)	273 cm (107 in)	(France) RC Cannes
18	Britt Ruysschaert	27 May 1994	1.77 m (5 ft 10 in)	62 kg (137 lb)	302 cm (119 in)	281 cm (111 in)	(Belgium) Asterix Kieldrecht
19	Sarah Cools	14 April 1997	1.88 m (6 ft 2 in)	68 kg (150 lb)	312 cm (123 in)	291 cm (115 in)	(Belgium) Asterix Kieldrecht
20	Maud Catry	4 September 1990	1.89 m (6 ft 2 in)	78 kg (172 lb)	307 cm (121 in)	302 cm (119 in)	(France) Saint-Cloud Paris

=== Azerbaijan ===
The following is the Azerbaijani roster in the 2014 FIVB Women's Volleyball World Championship.

Head coach: Aleksandr Chervyakov

No.	Name	Date of birth	Height	Weight	Spike	Block	2014 club
1	Jeyran Aliyeva	3 January 1995	1.65 m (5 ft 5 in)	51 kg (112 lb)	250 cm (98 in)	242 cm (95 in)	(Azerbaijan) Azeryol Baku
2	Kseniya Kovalenko	21 November 1986	1.90 m (6 ft 3 in)	78 kg (172 lb)	300 cm (120 in)	295 cm (116 in)	(Azerbaijan) Azeryol Baku
3	Anastasiya Gurbanova	4 December 1989	1.90 m (6 ft 3 in)	73 kg (161 lb)	305 cm (120 in)	290 cm (110 in)	(Azerbaijan) Azeryol Baku
4	Oksana Kurt (c)	28 July 1984	1.84 m (6 ft 0 in)	77 kg (170 lb)	300 cm (120 in)	290 cm (110 in)	(Azerbaijan) Azeryol Baku
5	Odina Bayramova	25 May 1990	1.86 m (6 ft 1 in)	88 kg (194 lb)	315 cm (124 in)	295 cm (116 in)	(Azerbaijan) Azeryol Baku
6	Ayshan Abdulazimova	11 April 1993	1.77 m (5 ft 10 in)	68 kg (150 lb)	265 cm (104 in)	260 cm (100 in)	(Azerbaijan) Lokomotiv Balajary
7	Yelena Parkhomenko	11 September 1982	1.86 m (6 ft 1 in)	68 kg (150 lb)	300 cm (120 in)	293 cm (115 in)	(Azerbaijan) Igtisadchi Baku
8	Natavan Gasimova	8 July 1985	1.78 m (5 ft 10 in)	61 kg (134 lb)	287 cm (113 in)	275 cm (108 in)	(Azerbaijan) Azerrail Baku
10	Jana Matiašovská-Aghayeva	7 July 1987	1.95 m (6 ft 5 in)	76 kg (168 lb)	318 cm (125 in)	302 cm (119 in)	(Poland) Atom Trefl Sopot
11	Katerina Zhidkova	28 September 1989	1.87 m (6 ft 2 in)	68 kg (150 lb)	298 cm (117 in)	285 cm (112 in)	(Azerbaijan) Igtisadchi Baku
16	Oksana Kiselyova	30 May 1992	1.77 m (5 ft 10 in)	70 kg (150 lb)	275 cm (108 in)	260 cm (100 in)	(Azerbaijan) Lokomotiv Balajary
17	Polina Rahimova	5 June 1990	1.95 m (6 ft 5 in)	73 kg (161 lb)	307 cm (121 in)	290 cm (110 in)	(South Korea) Hyundai Hillstate

== See also ==
- 2014 FIVB Volleyball Men's World Championship squads
