= 2010–11 Serie A1 (women's volleyball) =

2010–11 Italian Women's Serie A1
- League: Italian Women's Volleyball League
- Sport: Volleyball
- Teams: 12

Regular Season

Finals
- Champions: Norda Foppapedretti Bergamo
- Runners-up: MC-Carnaghi Villa Cortese

Italian Women's Volleyball League seasons
- ← 2009–10 2011–12 →

The 2010–11 Serie A1 was the 66th season of the highest Italian Women's Volleyball League.

== Teams ==
Team	City and Region	Stadium	Seasons in A1	Map
Asystel Volley Novara	Novara, Piedmont	Sporting Palace	10	2010–11 Serie A1 team distribution
Chateau d'Ax Urbino Volley	Urbino, Marche	PalaMondolce	2	2010–11 Serie A1 team distribution
Despar Perugia	Perugia, Umbria	PalaEvangelisti	21	2010–11 Serie A1 team distribution
Florens Castellana Grotte	Castellana Grotte, Apulia	PalaGrotte	3	2010–11 Serie A1 team distribution
LIU•JO Volley Modena	Modena, Emilia-Romagna	PalaPanini	1	2010–11 Serie A1 team distribution
MC-Carnaghi Villa Cortese	Castellanza, Lombardy	PalaBorsani	2	2010–11 Serie A1 team distribution
Norda Foppapedretti Bergamo	Bergamo, Lombardy	PalaNorda	17	2010–11 Serie A1 team distribution
Rebecchi Nordmeccanica Piacenza	Piacenza, Emilia-Romagna	PalAnguissola	3	2010–11 Serie A1 team distribution
Riso Scotti Pavia	Pavia, Lombardy	PalaRavizza	3	2010–11 Serie A1 team distribution
Scavolini Pesaro	Pesaro, Marche	PalaCampanara	8	2010–11 Serie A1 team distribution
Spes Conegliano	Conegliano, Veneto	Zoppas Arena	3	2010–11 Serie A1 team distribution
Yamamay Busto Arsizio	Busto Arsizio, Lombardy	PalaYamamay	9	2010–11 Serie A1 team distribution

== Regular season ==
Pos	Team	Pld	W	L	Pts	SW	SL	SR	SPW	SPL	SPR
1	MC-Carnaghi Villa Cortese	22	17	5	47	54	32	1.688	1992	1837	1.084
2	Norda Foppapedretti Bergamo	22	15	7	46	53	33	1.606	1967	1820	1.081
3	Scavolini Pesaro	22	14	8	46	53	31	1.710	1919	1825	1.052
4	Chateau d'Ax Urbino Volley	22	15	7	43	53	33	1.606	1953	1805	1.082
5	Yamamay Busto Arsizio	22	14	8	43	50	34	1.471	1903	1724	1.104
6	Asystel Volley Novara	22	13	9	40	49	37	1.324	1970	1865	1.056
7	Spes Conegliano	22	11	11	31	37	45	0.822	1782	1846	0.965
8	LIU•JO Volley Modena	22	8	14	25	35	47	0.745	1800	1821	0.988
9	Florens Castellana Grotte	22	8	14	25	36	50	0.720	1850	1954	0.947
10	Despar Perugia	22	8	14	23	33	51	0.647	1770	1910	0.927
11	Rebecchi Nordmeccanica Piacenza	22	8	14	22	35	50	0.700	1790	1933	0.926
12	Riso Scotti Pavia	22	1	21	5	19	64	0.297	1622	1978	0.820

== Playoffs ==
=== Bracket ===
First round
9	Castellana Grotte	2	0
8	Carpi	3	3
7	Conegliano	2	1
10	Perugia	3	3

Quarterfinals
1	Villa Cortese	3	3
8	Carpi	1	0
5	Busto Arsizio	3	3
4	Urbino	2	0
3	Pesaro	1	3	2
6	Novara	3	1	3
10	Perugia	0	1
2	Bergamo	3	3

Semifinals
1	Villa Cortese	3	0	3	3
5	Busto Arsizio	2	3	2	1
6	Novara	0	0	3	0
2	Bergamo	3	3	1	3

Finals
1	Villa Cortese	1	3	0	3	1
2	Bergamo	3	2	3	0	3

=== Eighth-finals ===
LIU•JO Volley Modena (8) 2:0 Florens Castellana Grotte (9)

Date	Time		Score		Set 1	Set 2	Set 3	Set 4	Set 5	Total	Report
4 May	20:30	LIU•JO Volley Modena	3–2	Florens Castellana Grotte	22–25	24–26	25–22	25–17	15–12	111–102	
6 May	20:30	Florens Castellana Grotte	0–3	LIU•JO Volley Modena	17–25	16–25	19–25			52–75	

Spes Conegliano (7) 0:2 Despar Perugia (10)

Date	Time		Score		Set 1	Set 2	Set 3	Set 4	Set 5	Total	Report
3 May	20:30	Spes Conegliano	2–3	Despar Perugia	23–25	24–26	25–16	25–22	13–15	110–104	
5 May	20:30	Despar Perugia	3–1	Spes Conegliano	25–21	24–26	25–17	25–18		99–82	

=== Quarterfinals ===
MC-Carnaghi Villa Cortese (1) 2:0 LIU•JO Volley Modena (8)

Date	Time		Score		Set 1	Set 2	Set 3	Set 4	Set 5	Total	Report
10 May	20:30	MC-Carnaghi Villa Cortese	3–1	LIU•JO Volley Modena	19–25	25–16	25–18	25–17		94–76	
12 May	20:30	LIU•JO Volley Modena	0–3	MC-Carnaghi Villa Cortese	23–25	16–25	18–25			57–75	

Chateau d'Ax Urbino Volley (4) 0:2 Yamamay Busto Arsizio (5)

Date	Time		Score		Set 1	Set 2	Set 3	Set 4	Set 5	Total	Report
9 May	20:30	Chateau d'Ax Urbino Volley	2–3	Yamamay Busto Arsizio	31–33	25–23	22–25	25–23	12–15	115–119	
11 May	20:30	Yamamay Busto Arsizio	3–0	Chateau d'Ax Urbino Volley	25–18	25–20	25–15			75–53	

Scavolini Pesaro (3) 1:2 Asystel Volley Novara (6)

Date	Time		Score		Set 1	Set 2	Set 3	Set 4	Set 5	Total	Report
9 May	20:30	Scavolini Pesaro	1–3	Asystel Volley Novara	20–25	16–25	25–22	25–27		86–99	
11 May	20:30	Asystel Volley Novara	1–3	Scavolini Pesaro	25–20	21–25	21–25	16–25		83–95	
13 May	20:30	Scavolini Pesaro	2–3	Asystel Volley Novara	22–25	25–16	23–25	25–22	9–15	104–103	

Norda Foppapedretti Bergamo (2) 2:0 Despar Perugia (10)

Date	Time		Score		Set 1	Set 2	Set 3	Set 4	Set 5	Total	Report
10 May	20:30	Norda Foppapedretti Bergamo	3–0	Despar Perugia	25–9	27–25	27–25			79–59	
12 May	20:30	Despar Perugia	1–3	Norda Foppapedretti Bergamo	19–25	16–25	25–22	24–26		84–98	

=== Semifinals ===
MC-Carnaghi Villa Cortese (1) 3:1 Yamamay Busto Arsizio (5)

Date	Time		Score		Set 1	Set 2	Set 3	Set 4	Set 5	Total	Report
17 May	20:30	MC-Carnaghi Villa Cortese	3–2	Yamamay Busto Arsizio	21–25	25–16	15–25	26–24	24–22	111–112	
19 May	20:30	MC-Carnaghi Villa Cortese	0–3	Yamamay Busto Arsizio	23–25	21–25	18–25			62–75	
21 May	20:30	Yamamay Busto Arsizio	2–3	MC-Carnaghi Villa Cortese	20–25	17–25	25–14	25–13	14–16	101–93	
23 May	20:30	Yamamay Busto Arsizio	1–3	MC-Carnaghi Villa Cortese	29–27	21–25	22–25	20–25		92–102	

Norda Foppapedretti Bergamo (2) 3:1 Asystel Volley Novara (6)

Date	Time		Score		Set 1	Set 2	Set 3	Set 4	Set 5	Total	Report
18 May	20:30	Norda Foppapedretti Bergamo	3–0	Asystel Volley Novara	25–22	25–18	25–21			75–61	
20 May	20:30	Norda Foppapedretti Bergamo	3–0	Asystel Volley Novara	25–17	29–27	25–12			79–56	
22 May	17:30	Asystel Volley Novara	3–1	Norda Foppapedretti Bergamo	25–23	16–25	25–19	25–22		91–89	
24 May	20:30	Asystel Volley Novara	0–3	Norda Foppapedretti Bergamo	20–25	25–27	20–25			65–77	

=== Finals ===
MC-Carnaghi Villa Cortese (1) 2:3 Norda Foppapedretti Bergamo (2)

Date	Time		Score		Set 1	Set 2	Set 3	Set 4	Set 5	Total	Report
29 May	20:30	MC-Carnaghi Villa Cortese	1–3	Norda Foppapedretti Bergamo	20–25	21–25	25–18	17–25		83–93	
31 May	20:30	MC-Carnaghi Villa Cortese	3–2	Norda Foppapedretti Bergamo	24–26	25–27	25–20	25–27	15–13	114–113	
2 Jun	20:30	Norda Foppapedretti Bergamo	3–0	MC-Carnaghi Villa Cortese	25–21	25–20	32–30			82–71	
4 Jun	20:30	Norda Foppapedretti Bergamo	0–3	MC-Carnaghi Villa Cortese	18–25	18–25	26–28			62–78	
6 Jun	20:30	MC-Carnaghi Villa Cortese	1–3	Norda Foppapedretti Bergamo	25–19	22–25	24–26	20–25		91–95	
