= Chaima =

Chaima (Arabic: شيماء) is a feminine given name of Arabic origin. Notable people with the name include:

- Chaima Doublai (born 1996), Moroccan singer known professionally as Chaimae Abdelaziz
- Chaima Ghobji (born 1994), Tunisian volleyball player
- Chaima Jouini (born 1996), Tunisian handball player
- Chaima Rahmouni (born 2001), Tunisian weightlifter
- Chaima Trabelsi (born 1982), Tunisian racewalker

== See also ==
- Chaima language
- Shaimaa, femiinine given name of Arabic origin
