= Shaimaa =

Shaimaa (Arabic: شيماء) is a feminine given name of Arabic origin. Shayma was the name of Prophet Muhammad's (c. 570–632 CE) foster sister. Notable people with the given name include:

== Shaima ==
- Shaima Rezayee (1981–2005), Afghan television presenter, actress, DJ,
- Shaima Zubeir, Iraqi television presenter,

== Shaimaa ==
- Shaimaa Abdul-Aziz (born 1981), Egyptian table tennis player,
- Shaimaa El-Gammal (born 1980), Egyptian fencer,
- Shimaa Hashad (born 1981), Egyptian sport shooter,
- Shaimaa Khalaf (born 1991), Egyptian weightlifter,

== Shayma ==
- Shayma Helali (born 1985), Tunisian singer and actress,

== Şeyma ==
- Şeyma Düztaş (born 2002), Turkish boxer,
- Şeyma Ercan (born 1994), Turkish volleyball player,
- Şeyma Nur Emeksiz Bacaksız (born 1998), Turkish Para Taekwondo practitioner,
- Şeyma Erenli (born 1988), Turkish-Australian footballer,

== See also ==
- Chaima, French-language writing of the same given name
