= Laura Heyrman =

Belgian volleyball player (born 1993)

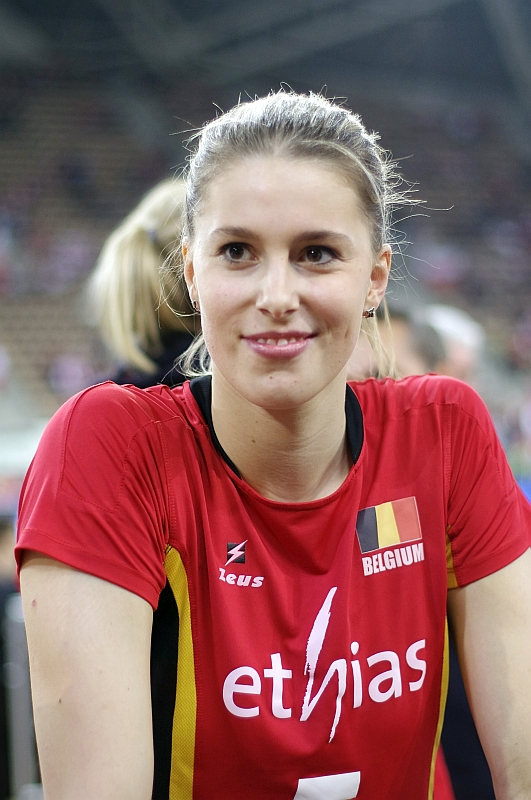

Personal information
- Nationality: Belgian
- Born: 17 May 1993 (age 33) Beveren, Belgium
- Height: 1.90 m (6 ft 3 in)
- Weight: 74 kg (163 lb)
- Spike: 310 cm (122 in)
- Block: 280 cm (110 in)

Volleyball information
- Position: Middle Blocker

National team
- Years: Team
- 2011–: Belgium
Honours
Women's volleyball
Representing Belgium
European Championships
Bronze medal – third place	2013 Germany	Team
Youth Olympic Games
Gold medal – first place	2010 Singapore	Team

Laura Heyrman (born 17 May 1993) is a retired Belgian professional volleyball player. She played in 108 official games for the Belgium women's national volleyball team and was a member of the Belgium women's national volleyball team that won a historic bronze medal at the 2013 Women's European Volleyball Championship. She was part of the Belgian national team at the 2014 FIVB Volleyball Women's World Championship in Italy. Heyrman reached the CEV Women's Champions League final with Eczacibasi in 2023 and a year later with Numia Vero Volley Milano. She won the CEV Cup twice, with Saugella Team Monza in 2021 and with Eczacıbaşı Dynavit Istanbul in 2022. She announced her retirement from professional volleyball after her team KS Developres Rzeszów lost the Polish Women's Volleyball League finals at the end of April 2026.

Although Heyrman never officially announced her retirement from the Belgium women's national volleyball team, she was one of the many players that started turning down invitations for the team. The reason became clear in December 2021 when Belgian national TV broadcaster VRT Canvas aired a documentary "The Price of the Winner" with testimony of Heyrman's former teammates Freya Aelbrecht, Valérie Courtois and Hélène Rousseaux decrying a toxic environment under headcoach Gert Vande Broek. After the program aired, Heyrman, contacted by several newspapers, confirmed the stories of her former teammates.

== Career ==
=== Clubs ===
- (Belgium) Asterix Kieldrecht (2009–2011)
- (Germany) Dresdner SC (2012–2013)
- (Italy) Liu Jo Modena (2013–2016)
- (Italy) Liu Jo Nordmeccanica Modena (2016–2018)
- (Japan) Hitachi Rivale (2018–2019)
- (Italy) Saugella Team Monza (2019–2021)
- (Turkey) Eczacıbaşı VitrA (2021–2023)
- (Italy) Numia Vero Volley Milano (2024–2025)
- (Poland) KS Developres Rzeszów (2026)

== Awards ==
=== Clubs ===
- 2009–10 Belgian Championship – Champion, with Asterix Kieldrecht
- 2009–10 Belgian Cup – Champion, with Asterix Kieldrecht
- 2009–10 CEV Women's Challenge Cup – Runner-Up, with Asterix Kieldrecht
- 2010–11 Belgian Championship – Champion, with Asterix Kieldrecht
- 2010–11 Belgian Cup – Champion, with Asterix Kieldrecht
- 2010-11 Belgian Supercup – Champion, with Asterix Kieldrecht
- 2011–12 Belgian Championship – Champion, with Asterix Kieldrecht
- 2011–12 Belgian Cup – Runner-Up, with Asterix Kieldrecht
- 2011–12 Belgian Supercup – Runner-Up, with Asterix Kieldrecht
- 2012–13 German Championship – Runner-Up, with Dresdner SC
- 2014–15 Italian Cup – Runner-Up, with Liu Jo Modena
- 2016–17 Italian Championship – Runner-Up, with Liu Jo Nordmeccanica Modena
- 2016–17 Italian Cup – Runner-Up, with Liu Jo Nordmeccanica Modena
- 2020-21 CEV Cup – Champion with Saugella Team Monza
- 2021-22 Turkish Super Cup – Runner-Up, with Eczacıbaşı Dynavit Istanbul
- 2021-22 CEV Cup – Champion with Eczacıbaşı Dynavit Istanbul
- 2022–23 Sultans League – Runner-Up, with Eczacıbaşı Dynavit Istanbul
- 2022–23 CEV Champions League – Runner-Up, with Eczacıbaşı Dynavit Istanbul
- 2023–24 Italian Cup – Runner-Up, with Numia Vero Volley Milano
- 2023–24 Italian Superup – Runner-Up, with Numia Vero Volley Milano
- 2023–24 CEV Champions League – Runner-Up, with Numia Vero Volley Milano
- 2024–25 Italian Championship – Runner-Up, with Numia Vero Volley Milano
- 2024–25 Italian Cup – Runner-Up, with Numia Vero Volley Milano
- 2024–25 Italian Superup – Runner-Up, with Numia Vero Volley Milano
- 2025–26 Polish Championship – Runner-Up, with KS Developres Rzeszów
- 2025-26 Polish Supercup – Champion with KS Developres Rzeszów

=== National team ===
==== Youth team ====
- 2010 Summer Youth Olympics - Gold Medal
- CEV U18 European Championship - Gold Medal
- FIVB U18 World Championship - Bronze Medal

==== Senior team ====
- 2013 Women's European Volleyball Championship - Bronze Medal

=== Individual ===
Heyrman was selected to play the Italian League All-Star game in 2016 and 2017.
