= Francesca Ferretti =

Italian volleyball player

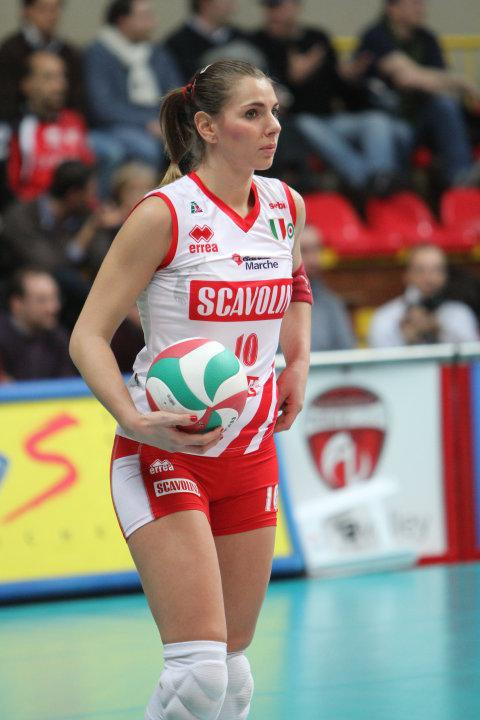

Personal information
- Nickname: Francy
- Nationality: Italy
- Born: 15 February 1984 (age 42) Reggio Emilia, Italy
- Height: 1.80 m (5 ft 11 in)
- Weight: 70 kg (154 lb)
- Spike: 296 cm (117 in)
- Block: 280 cm (110 in)

Volleyball information
- Position: Setter
- Current club: Liu Jo Nordmeccanica Modena
- Number: 10

Career
- Years: Team
- 1998–2000: Giovolley Reggio Emilia
- 2000–2001: Club Italia
- 2001–2002: Sirio Perugia
- 2002–2003: Chieri Volley
- 2003–2005: Volley Modena
- 2005–2007: Chieri Volley
- 2007–2012: Scavolini Pesaro
- 2012–2014: Rebecchi Nordmeccanica Piacenza
- 2014–2015: Rabita Baku
- 2015–2016: Liu Jo Modena
- 2016–: Liu Jo Nordmeccanica Modena

National team
- Years: Team
- 2003–2016: Italy
Honours
Women's volleyball
Representing Italy
FIVB Volleyball Women's World Cup
Gold medal – first place	2007 Japan	Team
FIVB World Grand Prix
Silver medal – second place	2004 Reggio Calabria	Team
Silver medal – second place	2005 Sendai	Team
Bronze medal – third place	2008 Yokohama	Team
European Championship
Gold medal – first place	2007 Belgium-Luxembourg	Team
- Updated on 23 February 2017

Francesca Ferretti (born 15 February 1984 in Reggio Emilia) is an Italian professional volleyball player who plays as a setter. As a member of the Italy women's national volleyball team she played in many international competitions (Olympic Games, FIVB World Championship, FIVB World Cup, FIVB World Grand Prix, European Championships) and is a World Cup and European Championship winner. At club level she plays for Liu Jo Nordmeccanica Modena and has won national and international competitions with the clubs she played for.

== Career ==
Ferretti started playing volleyball at Giovolley Reggio Emilia youth teams and at the age of fourteen made her debut for the first team in the Serie B2. In 2000, she moved to Club Italia and became involved in the Italian national youth teams between 2000 and 2001, finishing second at the 2000 Women's Junior European Volleyball Championship and winning the 2001 Girls' Youth European Volleyball Championship.

After one season at Club Italia, she moved to Despar Colussi Perugia and made her debut in the Serie A1 in 2001. For the following season she signed with BigMat Chieri in September 2002, winning the 2002–03 Serie A2 championship (and promotion to Serie A1) and reaching the finals of the Serie A2 Italian Cup with the club.

On 28 May 2003, she made her debut for the senior Italian national team in a 3–2 victory against Cuba played in Ancona. A few months later she signed with Volley Modena, coached by Giovanni Guidetti, ahead of the 2003–04 season. She reached the Serie A1 playoffs semifinals during that first season at the club.

Following her good performances, she was called to the national team and was part of the 2004 campaign, which included a gold medal at the Montreux Volley Masters, a silver medal at the World Grand Prix and a fifth-place finish at the Olympic Games in Athens.

Her second season at Volley Modena was very different, the club struggled and at the end of the 2004–05 season was relegated to the Serie A2. With the national team she won a bronze medal at the 2005 Montreux Volley Masters and a silver medal at the 2005 FIVB Volleyball World Grand Prix.

Later in 2005, Ferretti returned to BigMat Chieri under the coaching of Giovanni Guidetti, but during a Serie A1 match against Asystel Novara on 30 October 2005, she injured her right knee. Further exams confirmed she suffered an anterior cruciate ligament injury and on 30 November 2005, she had a successful surgery which included the anterior cruciate ligament reconstruction and medial meniscus replacement of her right knee. She spent 8 months recovering and missed the remaining of the 2005–06 season.

Back for the 2006–07 season, her club performances helped BigMat Chieri finish sixth and reach the Serie A1 playoffs. After the end of the season, on 12 June 2007, she signed with Scavolini Pesaro before joining the national team which won both the 2007 Women's European Volleyball Championship and the 2007 FIVB Volleyball Women's World Cup.

Scavolini Pesaro was under the management and coaching of the experienced and successful José Roberto Guimarães and his staff at the time. She developed technically and alongside her teammates became a strong and very competitive team. In her first season at the club (2007–08), she won the CEV Cup, reached the final of the Italian Cup, and won the Serie A1 title. She then joined the national team to finish third at the 2008 FIVB Volleyball World Grand Prix and fifth at the Olympic Games in Beijing.

The 2008–09 season was even more successful, she won the 2008 Italian Supercup, the Italian Cup and for the second consecutive year, the Serie A1. In 2009–10, she won her second consecutive Italian Supercup, reached the semifinals of the Italian Cup and won her third consecutive Serie A1. She won the Italian Supercup for a third consecutive year in 2010 and finished fourth at the 2010–11 Champions League.

In May 2012 she signed with Rebecchi Nordmeccanica Piacenza. In her first season at the club she won the 2012–13 double (Serie A1 and Italian Cup) and reached the finals of the CEV Challenge Cup. The 2013–14 season, her second at the club, was also very successful as she won the treble (Supercup, Cup and Serie A1). That meant she had won 13 domestic titles (five Serie A1, four Cups and four Supercups) in the last 7 seasons.

In May 2014, she agreed on a year contract to play for Rabita Baku of the Azerbaijani Super League. On 16 August 2014, while playing for the national team at the 2014 FIVB Volleyball World Grand Prix match against Germany, she had a right knee injury. On 19 August 2014, she had a successful surgery to remove meniscus damaged fragments on her right knee. She recovered in time to play the 2014 World Championship, which Italy was fourth place after losing 2-3 to Brazil in the bronze medal match.

In the 2014–15 season, her new club, Rabita Baku was competing in the Super League and the Champions League. Ferretti started the season in both competitions, but a Champions League group stage defeat to Chemik Police which eliminated the club from the tournament in late January 2015, lead to uncertainty at the club due to its finances and on 5 February 2015 her contract with the club was terminated by mutual agreement.

In late February 2015, she signed with Liu Jo Modena for the remaining of the 2014–15 season and made her debut for the club in the semifinal of the Italian Cup on 28 February 2015. She reached the Italian Cup final, but the club was defeated by Igor Gorgonzola Novara. She signed a two-year contract to remain at the club before the start of the 2015–16 season.

On 19 May 2016, when Liu Jo Modena ceased its volleyball activities and joined Nordmeccanica Piacenza, she became a Liu Jo Nordmeccanica Modena player.

== Personal life ==
She comes from a family with volleyball tradition, her father is an instructor and former player, her mother is a former player and her brother is also a player.

In 2008, the authorized biography book Un angelo biondo - Francy Ferretti (A blond angel - Francy Ferretti) by Camilla Cataldo was published in Italy.

== Clubs ==
- (Italy) Giovolley Reggio Emilia (1998–2000)
- (Italy) Club Italia (2000–2001)
- (Italy) Despar Colussi Perugia (2001–2002)
- (Italy) BigMat Chieri (2002–2003)
- (Italy) Volley Modena (2003–2005)
- (Italy) Bigmat Chieri (2005–2007)
- (Italy) Scavolini Pesaro (2007–2012)
- (Italy) Rebecchi Nordmeccanica Piacenza (2012–2014)
- (Azerbaijan) Rabita Baku (2014–2015)
- (Italy) Liu Jo Modena (2015–2016)
- (Italy) Liu Jo Nordmeccanica Modena (2016–present)

== Awards ==
=== Individual ===
- 2001 FIVB Volleyball Women's U20 World Championship "Berst Server"
- 2003–04 Serie A1 "under-20 Best Player"
- 2007–08 CEV Cup "Best Setter"

=== National team results ===
==== Junior ====
- 2000 Women's Junior European Volleyball Championship — Silver medal
- 2001 FIVB Volleyball Women's U20 World Championship — 4th place
- 2001 Girls' Youth European Volleyball Championship — Gold medal

==== Senior ====
- 2003 Montreux Volley Masters — 5th place
- 2004 Montreux Volley Masters — Gold medal
- 2004 FIVB Volleyball World Grand Prix — Silver medal
- 2004 Olympic Games — 5th place
- 2005 Montreux Volley Masters — Bronze medal
- 2005 FIVB Volleyball World Grand Prix — Silver medal
- 2007 Women's European Volleyball Championship — Gold medal
- 2007 FIVB Volleyball Women's World Cup — Gold medal
- 2008 FIVB Volleyball World Grand Prix — Bronze medal
- 2008 Olympic Games — 5th place
- 2011 FIVB Volleyball World Grand Prix — 7th place
- 2011 Women's European Volleyball Championship — 4th place
- 2014 FIVB Volleyball World Grand Prix — 9th place
- 2014 FIVB Volleyball Women's World Championship — 4th place

=== Club honours ===
- 2007–08 CEV Cup — Gold medal (with Scavolini Pesaro)
- 2007–08 Italian Cup — Silver medal (with Scavolini Pesaro)
- 2007–08 Italian Championship — Gold medal (with Scavolini Pesaro)
- 2008 Italian Supercup — Gold medal (with Scavolini Pesaro)
- 2008–09 Italian Cup — Gold medal (with Scavolini Pesaro)
- 2008–09 Italian Championship — Gold medal (with Scavolini Pesaro)
- 2009 Italian Supercup — Gold medal (with Scavolini Pesaro)
- 2009–10 Italian Championship — Gold medal (with Scavolini Pesaro)
- 2010 Italian Supercup — Gold medal (with Scavolini Pesaro)
- 2012–13 CEV Challenge Cup — Silver medal (with Rebecchi Nordmeccanica Piacenza)
- 2012–13 Italian Cup — Gold medal (with Rebecchi Nordmeccanica Piacenza)
- 2012–13 Italian Championship — Gold medal (with Rebecchi Nordmeccanica Piacenza)
- 2013 Italian Supercup — Gold medal (with Rebecchi Nordmeccanica Piacenza)
- 2013–14 Italian Cup — Gold medal (with Rebecchi Nordmeccanica Piacenza)
- 2013–14 Italian Championship — Gold medal (with Rebecchi Nordmeccanica Piacenza)
- 2014–15 Italian Cup — Silver medal (with Liu Jo Modena)
- 2016–17 Italian Cup — Silver medal (with Liu Jo Nordmeccanica Modena)
- 2016–17 Italian Championship — Silver medal (with Liu Jo Nordmeccanica Modena)
