= PalaPanini =

Indoor sports venue in Modena, Italy

Coordinates: 44.644779°N 10.954013°E

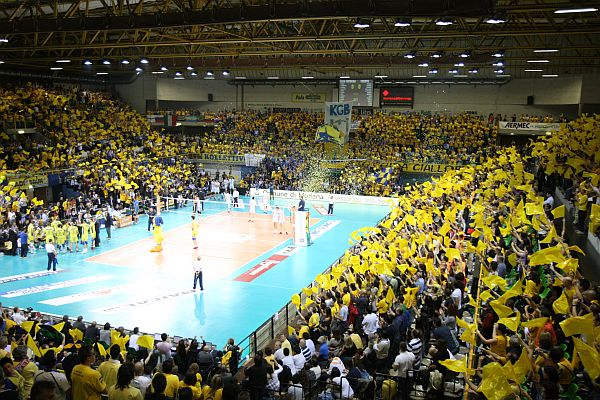
- Interactive map of PalaPanini
- Full name: Palazzo dello Sport "Giuseppe Panini"
- Address: Viale dello Sport, 25; Modena, Italy
- Owner: Comune di Modena
- Operator: Modena Volley
- Capacity: 4,968
- Field size: 52m x 35m

Construction
- Opened: 1985

Tenants
- Modena Volley (1985–present); Volley Modena (1985–2013); LJ Volley (2013–2016); Liu Jo Nordmeccanica Modena (2016–present)

Website
- Palazzo dello sport (Palasport) G. Panini

The PalaPanini (officially Palazzo dello Sport "Giuseppe Panini") is an indoor sporting arena located in Modena, Italy. It was open in 1985 and has mainly served as the home venue for volleyball clubs based in and around Modena, with other sporting events (basketball, futsal, table tennis, fencing, judo, martial arts) taking place occasionally. The venue can also accommodate conventions, theatre and music concerts.

The sporting complex includes the main play area (52m x 35m) for basketball, volleyball or table tennis, which can be divided into 3 pavilions. The facilities also contain dressing rooms, infirmary, gyms, special rooms (for martial arts and fencing), warehouses, sports medicine ambulatory service, offices, meeting rooms, press room, toilets, bar and ticket office. The capacity is of 4,968 spectators for sporting events.

Secret World Live, a live album by English musician Peter Gabriel, was recorded at PalaPanini (then known as Palasport Nuovo) on November 16 and 17, 1993.
