= Esther Eba'a Mballa =

Cameroonian volleyball player (born 1984)

Personal information
- Nationality: Cameroon
- Born: 11 March 1984 (age 42)
- Height: 1.78 m (5 ft 10 in)
- Weight: 71 kg (157 lb)
- Spike: 282 cm (111 in)
- Block: 270 cm (110 in)

Volleyball information
- Number: 8

Career
Years	Teams
2014	(Cameroon) INJS Yaoundé

Esther Eba'a Mballa (born 11 March 1984) is a Cameroonian female volleyball player. She is a member of the Cameroon women's national volleyball team and played for INJS Yaoundé in 2014.

She was part of the Cameroonian national team at the 2014 FIVB Volleyball Women's World Championship in Italy.

== Clubs ==
- (Cameroon) INJS Yaoundé (2014)
