= Ana Valle =

Mexican volleyball player

Personal information
- Nationality: Mexico
- Born: 31 May 1996 (age 30)
- Height: 1.94 m (6 ft 4 in)
- Weight: 89 kg (196 lb)
- Spike: 310 cm (120 in)
- Block: 297 cm (117 in)

Volleyball information
- Number: 20

Career
Years	Teams
2014	(Mexico) Distrito Federal

Ana Valle (born 31 May 1996) is a Mexican female volleyball player. She is a member of the Mexico women's national volleyball team and played for Distrito Federal in 2014.

She was part of the Mexico national team at the 2014 FIVB Volleyball Women's World Championship in Italy.

== Clubs ==
- (Mexico) Distrito Federal (2014)
