= Nadine Nyadjo =

Cameroonian volleyball player (born 1985)

Personal information
- Full name: Leonce Nadine Nyadjo Nguepmegne
- Nationality: Cameroon
- Born: 18 November 1985 (age 40); Bertoua
- Height: 1.74 m (5 ft 9 in)
- Weight: 78 kg (172 lb)
- Spike: 275 cm (108 in)
- Block: 270 cm (110 in)

Volleyball information
- Number: 14

Career
Years	Teams
2014	(Cameroon) Bafia Evolution

Leonce Nadine Nyadjo Nguepmegne (born November 18, 1985, in Bertoua) is a Cameroonian female volleyball player. She is a member of the Cameroon women's national volleyball team and played for Bafia Evolution in 2014.

She was part of the Cameroonian national team at the 2014 FIVB Volleyball Women's World Championship in Italy.

== Clubs ==
- (Cameroon) Bafia Evolution (2014)
