= Fatma Agrebi =

Tunisian volleyball player

Personal information
- Nationality: Tunisia
- Born: 14 September 1990 (age 36)
- Height: 1.81 m (5 ft 11 in)
- Weight: 78 kg (172 lb)
- Spike: 296 cm (117 in)
- Block: 275 cm (108 in)

Volleyball information
- Number: 1

Career
Years	Teams
2014	(Tunisia) CF Carthage

Fatma Agrebi (born 14 September 1990) is a Tunisian female volleyball player. She is a member of the Tunisia women's national volleyball team and played for CF Carthage in 2014.

She was part of the Tunisian national team at the 2014 FIVB Volleyball Women's World Championship in Italy.

== Clubs ==
- (Tunisia) CF Carthage (2014)
