= Alejandra Segura =

Mexican volleyball player

Personal information
- Full name: Alejandra Patricia Segura Maldonado
- Nationality: Mexico
- Born: 9 November 1993 (age 33) Mexico City
- Height: 1.77 m (5 ft 10 in)
- Weight: 69 kg (152 lb)
- Spike: ?
- Block: ?

Volleyball information
- Number: 9

Career
- Years: Team
- 2014: (Mexico) Nuevo León

Alejandra Patricia Segura Maldonado (born 9 November 1993) is a Mexican volleyball player. She is a member of the Mexico women's national volleyball team.

She was part of the Mexico national team at the 2014 FIVB Volleyball Women's World Championship in Italy. On the club level, she played for Nuevo León in 2014.

== Clubs ==
- (Mexico) Nuevo León (2014)
