= Shaima Zubeir =

Iraqi television presenter

Shaima Zubeir is an Iraqi television presenter. She is the host of Labour and Materials, a popular Iraqi property makeover show. In 2005, she was voted Iraq's favourite television personality and her maternal approach has led to her being dubbed the 'Oprah of Iraq'.

Zubeir has gained a large following in Iraq because she believes in providing a social service for the people affected by the war, instead of simply diverting a large audience away from reality as other popular Iraqi reality shows do. Her show, Labour and Materials, reflects this belief. All of the homes selected to appear on the programme have been bombed since the US invasion of Iraq in 2003. Since 2004, Zubeir and her production crew have rebuilt six houses.

In 2006, Zubeir was featured, along with other Iraqi television personalities, in the documentary film TV Iraqi-Style. The documentary followed Zubeir while she was filming an episode of her show in Sadr City, a dangerous, but poor, suburb in Baghdad.
