= Gruppo Sportivo Oratorio Villa Cortese =

Italian volleyball team

Asystel MC Carnaghi Villa Cortese
- Full name: Gruppo Sportivo Oratorio Pallavolo Femminile Villa Cortese
- Short name: GSO
- Nickname: Il Villa
- Founded: 1978
- Dissolved: 2013
- Ground: PalaBorsani, Castellanza, Italy (Capacity: 1,650)

Uniforms
Home	Away

Gruppo Sportivo Oratorio Pallavolo Femminile Villa Cortese was an Italian women's volleyball club based in Villa Cortese in the Province of Milan. The team played in Serie A1, the highest women's league in Italy, from 2009 until 2013.

== Previous names ==
Due to sponsorship, the club have competed under the following names:

- Gruppo Sportivo Oratorio Pallavolo Femminile Villa Cortese (1978–2004)
- MC-Carnaghi Villa Cortese (2004–2012)
- Asystel MC Carnaghi Villa Cortese (2012–2013)

== History ==
The club was founded in 1978 as an initiative to offer sports practice to girls and young women. As early as 1979, it started playing its youth teams in the lower regional leagues and through the years gained promotions to highest regional leagues. As the club reached closer to the national professional leagues, its youth amateur oriented focus changed and main sponsors started to join from 2004. The club changed its structure and name to MC-Carnaghi Villa Cortese, becoming professional.

It reached the Serie A2 in 2008 and the Serie A1 in the following year. For three seasons, from its Serie A debut in the 2009–10 until 2011–12, the club reached five out of six possible finals in Italian volleyball competition (league, cup and supercup), missing only the Italian Cup final of 2011–12 and winning the other two cup editions. It also reached the Italian Cup final in 2012–13 and participated in the CEV Champions League in 2010–11, 2011–12 and 2012–13.

Ahead of the 2012–13 season, the club merged with Asystel Novara taking over Novara's volleyball activities and was renamed Asystel MC Carnaghi. In April 2013, after the end of the season, the club sold its Serie A1 licence to LJ Volley and announced it was restarting from Serie B1. In May 2013, the club decided to revive its origins and focus on youth teams forming a new club called GSO Villa Cortese Volley asd and starting from Serie D.

== Arena ==
The club played at the PalaBorsani, an indoor arena located in Castellanza. A smaller indoor arena in Vanzaghello was also used for training purposes and minor non-competitive matches. The arena in Vanzaghello was home to the team when it played in the Serie A2 National League.

== Honours ==
=== National competitions ===
- Coppa Italia: 2

2009–10, 2010–11
