= Fride Mekong à Iroume =

Cameroonian volleyball player

Personal information
- Nationality: Cameroon
- Born: 8 July 1985 (age 41)
- Height: 1.74 m (5 ft 9 in)
- Weight: 68 kg (150 lb)
- Spike: 264 cm (104 in)
- Block: 240 cm (94 in)

Volleyball information
- Number: 4

Career
Years	Teams
2014	(Cameroon) FAP Yaoundé

Fride Mekong à Iroume (born 8 July 1985) is a Cameroonian female volleyball player. She is a member of the Cameroon women's national volleyball team and played for FAP Yaoundé in 2014. She was part of the Cameroonian national team at the 2014 FIVB Volleyball Women's World Championship in Italy.

== Clubs ==
- (Cameroon) FAP Yaoundé (2014)
