= Chaimae Abdelaziz =

Moroccan Singer (born 1996)

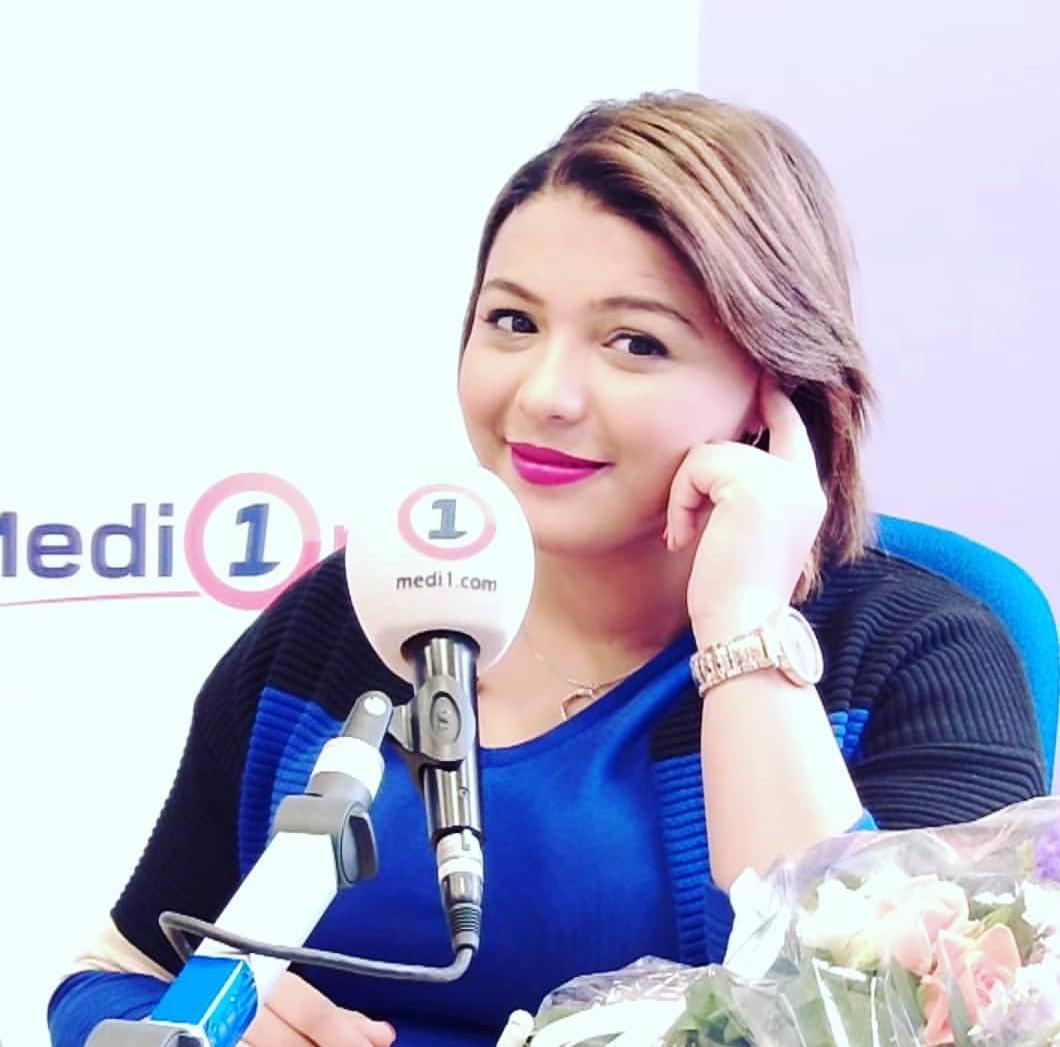
- Chaimae in 2018

Background information
- Born: Chaima Doublal; January 26, 1996 (age 29); Marrakesh, Morocco
- Genres: Arab pop, Arab Tarab, Moroccan music, Moroccan pop, Khaleeji, Arabic music, Middle Eastern music, Raï
- Occupation: Singer
- Years active: 2017–present

Chaima Doublal, known professionally as Chaimae Abdelaziz (Arabic: شيماء عبدالعزيز; born January 26, 1996) is a Moroccan singer who rose to popularity as a contestant in the fourth season of The Voice Ahla Sawt, broadcast on MBC. She sang various songs of both Moroccan and Middle-Eastern repertoires and reached the quart-finals.

== Early life ==
Chaimae was born on January 26, 1996, in Marrakesh, the youngest of four siblings. She was passionate about music and acting from a very young age. Her talent was discovered by her mother at the age of 6. She grew up influenced by Moroccan music. At age 9, Chaimae sang in front of an audience for the first time.

In 2013, she won the first place in the 3rd edition of Young Talent Festival in Music and Singing In Marrakesh.

== Participation in The Voice Ahla Sawt ==
Chaimae competed in the fourth season of The Voice Ahla Sawt, Her audition performance of "Jital libabak" led all four coaches to turn their chairs. Chaimae chose to be part of Mohamed Hamaki's team after Hamaki presented her a ring adorned with "The Voice" icon. She reached the 3rd Live show.

== Performances in The Voice Ahla Sawt ==
- Blind auditions: Jitak libabak – Naima Samih
- The battles: Al gany baad youmeen – Samira Said
- 1st Live show: Fatet sana – Mayada el hennawiy
- 2nd Live show: J'en ai marre and Chedi weldak alia – Najat Aatabou and Zina daoudia
- 3rd Live show: Ya dalaly Alih – Warda Al-Jazairia
