= LJ Volley =

Liu Jo Modena
- Full name: LJ Volley
- Founded: 2013
- Dissolved: 2016
- Ground: PalaPanini, Modena, Italy (Capacity: 5,200)

Uniforms
Home	Away

LJ Volley, known as Liu Jo Modena, was an Italian women's volleyball club based in Modena. It played in the Serie A1 from its creation in 2013 until its dissolution in 2016.

== History ==
The club was established when fashion company Liu·Jo decided to create a volleyball club based in Modena and in May 2013, the company acquired a Serie A1 licence from Gruppo Sportivo Oratorio Villa Cortese. The club was officially unveiled in Carpi (Modena) on 28 May 2013 under the name LJ Volley. The project goal was to bring women's volleyball back to Modena, which has a long tradition in the sport, by creating a professional club and supporting a local club focussed on youth teams.

After the club's third season, in May 2016, an agreement between the club and Nordmeccanica Piacenza was announced, following LJ Volley decision to ceased its volleyball operations. In the agreement River Volley acquired LJ Volley assets (players and rights to play at the PalaPanini) with Liu Jo becoming River's main sponsor and the club based in Piacenza was renamed Liu Jo Nordmeccanica Modena with home matches played at the PalaPanini in Modena. LJ Volley sold its Serie A1 licence to Neruda Volley.

== Team ==
The club's last team, season 2015–2016.

Number	Player	Position	Height (m)	Weight (kg)	Birth date
1	(Italy) Floriana Bertone	Middle blocker	2.02	80	19 November 1992 (age 33)
2	(Italy) Giulia Carraro	Setter	1.75	69	25 July 1994 (age 31)
3	(Italy) Nicole Gamba	Libero	1.70		2 June 1998 (age 27)
4	(Spain) Jéssica Rivero	Outside hitter	1.82	80	15 March 1995 (age 30)
5	(Belgium) Laura Heyrman	Middle blocker	1.88	74	17 May 1993 (age 32)
6	(Italy) Chiara Di Iulio	Outside hitter	1.85	65	5 May 1985 (age 40)
7	(Italy) Raphaela Folie	Middle blocker	1.86	82	7 March 1991 (age 34)
8	(Italy) Marta Galeotti	Setter	1.72		27 September 1984 (age 41)
9	(Italy) Chiara Arcangeli	Libero	1.67	57	14 February 1983 (age 42)
10	(Italy) Francesca Ferretti	Setter	1.80	70	15 February 1984 (age 41)
13	(Italy) Valentina Diouf	Outside hitter	2.02	89	10 January 1993 (age 32)
14	(Croatia) Bernarda Ćutuk	Middle blocker	1.87	76	22 December 1990 (age 35)
15	(Serbia) Sanja Starović	Outside hitter	1.94	89	25 March 1983 (age 42)
17	(Slovenia) Lana Ščuka	Outside hitter	1.83	71	6 October 1996 (age 29)
18	(Hungary) Dóra Horváth	Outside hitter	1.87	78	4 March 1988 (age 37)
Head coach: (Italy) Alessandro Beltrami

2014–2015 Team
Number	Player	Position	Height (m)	Weight (kg)	Birth date
1	(Belgium) Hélène Rousseaux	Outside hitter	1.88	70	25 September 1991 (age 34)
4	(Serbia) Olivera Kostić	Outside hitter	1.85	76	9 December 1991 (age 34)
5	(Belgium) Laura Heyrman	Middle blocker	1.88	74	17 May 1993 (age 32)
6	(Italy) Francesca Ferretti	Setter	1.80	70	15 February 1984 (age 41)
7	(Italy) Raphaela Folie	Middle blocker	1.86	82	7 March 1991 (age 34)
9	(Italy) Chiara Arcangeli	Libero	1.67	57	14 February 1983 (age 42)
10	(Italy) Emilia Petrachi	Libero	1.70		12 February 1996 (age 29)
11	(Italy) Elisa Muri	Setter	1.78		10 June 1984 (age 41)
12	(Italy) Francesca Piccinini	Outside hitter	1.85	62	10 January 1979 (age 46)
13	(Croatia) Samanta Fabris	Outside hitter	1.89	79	8 February 1992 (age 33)
14	(Italy) Lucia Crisanti	Middle blocker	1.87	70	16 March 1986 (age 39)
15	(Italy) Ilaria Maruotti	Outside hitter	1.83		22 February 1994 (age 31)
17	(Italy) Giulia Rondon	Setter	1.90	75	16 October 1997 (age 28)
18	(Croatia) Matea Ikic	Outside hitter	1.85	79	25 May 1989 (age 36)
Head coach: (Italy) Alessandro Beltrami

2013–2014 Team
Number	Player	Position	Height (m)	Weight (kg)	Birth date
1	(Belgium) Hélène Rousseaux	Outside hitter	1.88	70	25 September 1991 (age 34)
3	(Italy) Elena Perinelli	Outside hitter	1.81	68	27 June 1995 (age 30)
5	(Belgium) Laura Heyrman	Middle blocker	1.88	74	17 May 1993 (age 32)
6	(Italy) Paola Paggi	Middle blocker	1.82	72	6 December 1976 (age 49)
7	(Italy) Vittoria Prandi	Setter	1.80		4 November 1994 (age 31)
8	(Croatia) Danijela Anđelić	Outside hitter	1.87	78	30 June 1988 (age 37)
9	(Italy) Emilia Petrachi	Libero	1.70		12 February 1996 (age 29)
10	(Italy) Paola Cardullo	Libero	1.62	56	18 March 1982 (age 43)
11	(Bulgaria) Hristina Ruseva	Middle blocker	1.90	77	1 October 1991 (age 34)
12	(Italy) Francesca Piccinini	Outside hitter	1.85	62	10 January 1979 (age 46)
13	(Croatia) Samanta Fabris	Outside hitter	1.89	79	8 February 1992 (age 33)
14	(Italy) Lucia Crisanti	Middle blocker	1.87	70	16 March 1986 (age 39)
15	(Italy) Ilaria Maruotti	Outside hitter	1.83		22 February 1994 (age 31)
17	(Italy) Giulia Rondon	Setter	1.90	75	16 October 1997 (age 28)
Head coach: (Italy) Mauro Chiappafreddo
