= Chaima Ghobji =

Tunisian volleyball player (born 1994)

Chaima Gobji

Personal information
- Nationality: Tunisia
- Born: 22 August 1994 (age 32)
- Height: 1.77 m (5 ft 10 in)
- Weight: 72 kg (159 lb)
- Spike: 276 cm (109 in)
- Block: 263 cm (104 in)

Volleyball information
- Number: 2

Career
Years	Teams
2014	(Tunisia) CO Kélibia

Chaima Gobji (born 22 August 1994) is a Tunisian female volleyball player. She is a member of the Tunisia women's national volleyball team and played for CO Kélibia in 2014.

She was part of the Tunisian national team at the 2014 FIVB Volleyball Women's World Championship in Italy.

== Clubs ==
- (Tunisia) CO Kélibia (2014)
