= Hélène Rousseaux =

Belgian volleyball player (born 1991)

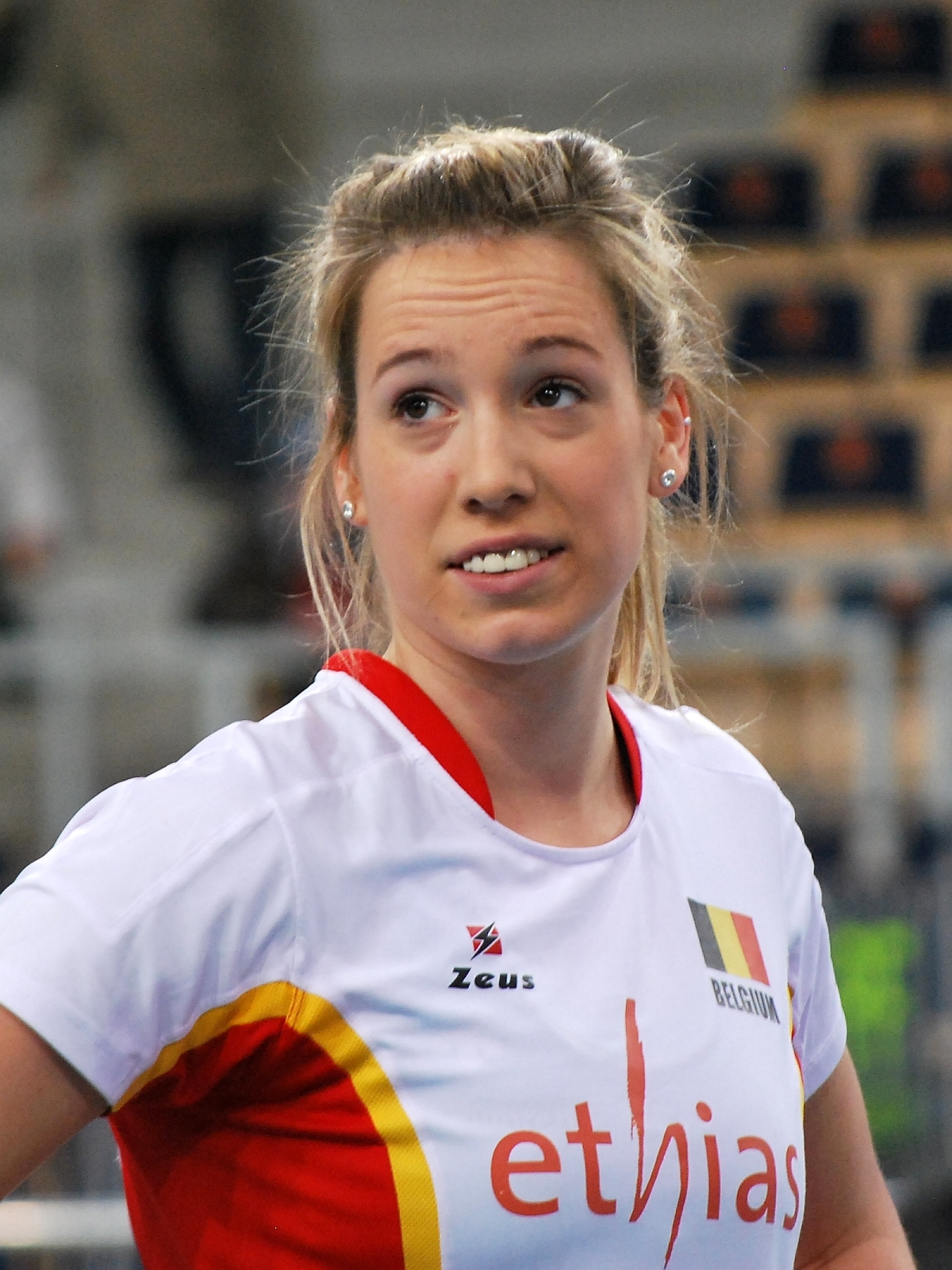

Personal information
- Nationality: Belgium
- Born: 25 September 1991 (age 35)
- Height: 1.87 m (6 ft 2 in)
- Weight: 70 kg (154 lb)
- Spike: 322 cm (127 in)
- Block: 300 cm (118 in)

Volleyball information
- Current club: Farm Fresh Foxies

Career
Years	Teams
2020	(South Korea) Suwon Hyundai Engineering & Construction Hillstate
Honours
Women's volleyball
Representing Belgium
European Championships
Bronze medal – third place	2013 Germany	Team

Hélène Rousseaux (born 25 September 1991) is a Belgian female volleyball player for the Farm Fresh Foxies of the Premier Volleyball League (PVL) in the Philippines. She is a member of the Belgium women's national volleyball team.

She was part of the Belgian national team at the 2014 FIVB Volleyball Women's World Championship in Italy. Belgian national volleyball player Tomas Rousseaux is her brother.

== Clubs ==
- (Belgium) Vilvoorde (2008–2009)
- (Switzerland) Voléro Zürich (2009–2011)
- (Poland) Budowlani Łódź (2011–2012)
- (Poland) Muszyna (2012–2013)
- (Italy) LJ Modena (2013–2015)
- (Italy) AGIL Novara (2015–2016)
- (Italy) Busto Arsizio (2016)
- (Turkey) Beşiktaş (2016–2017)
- (Poland) Rzeszów (2017-)
- (South Korea) Suwon Hyundai Engineering & Construction Hillstate (2020-)
