= River Volley =

Italian women's volleyball club

Liu Jo Nordmeccanica Modena
- Full name: River Volley
- Founded: 1983
- Dissolved: 2018
- Ground: PalaPanini, Modena, Italy (Capacity: 5,200)
- League: FIPAV Women's Serie A1
- Website: Club home page

Uniforms
| Home | Away |

River Volley was an Italian women's volleyball club based in Piacenza. The club's activities ceased in 2018 when it sold its rights to play in Serie A1 to Cuneo Granda Volley.

== Previous names ==
Due to sponsorship, the club have competed under the following names:

- River Volley (1983–1994)
- Libertas-River Volley (1994–1998)
- Rebecchi River Volley (1998–2003)
- Rebecchi River Volley Rivergaro (2003–2005)
- Rebecchi Rivergaro Piacenza (2005–2006)
- Rebecchi Cariparma Piacenza Volley (2006–2007)
- RebecchiLupa Piacenza (2007–2010)
- Rebecchi Nordmeccanica Piacenza (2010–2014)
- Nordmeccanica Rebecchi Piacenza (2014–2015)
- Nordmeccanica Piacenza (2015–2016)
- Liu Jo Nordmeccanica Modena (2016–2018)

== History ==
The club was founded in 1983 as River Volley and was based in Rivergaro. It had only youth team activities until 1988 when a senior team was created and the club started competing in the lower divisions in Italy. By the early 2000s the club was playing in the third and second divisions of the Italian league, and decided to move its professional senior activities to Piacenza keeping the youth activities in Rivergaro. It reached the Serie A1 for the first time in 2006, after winning promotion at the end of the 2005–06 season. It was relegated in its first season at Serie A1 but returned to the highest league for the 2009–10 season. The club started to become competitive in the Serie A1, winning the league, cup and supercup in both 2012–13 and 2013–14 seasons.

In May 2016, an agreement between River Volley and Liu Jo Modena (LJ Volley) was announced, following LJ Volley decision to stop its volleyball activities. In the agreement River Volley acquired LJ Volley assets (players and rights to play at the PalaPanini) with Liu Jo becoming River's main sponsor and the club being renamed Liu Jo Nordmeccanica Modena. The club remain based in Piacenza but its home matches moved from PalaBanca to be played at the PalaPanini in Modena.

After the 2017–2018 season Cuneo Granda Volley acquired the rights to play in Serie A1 from River Volley and the club was dissolved.

== Team ==
2017–2018 Team
| Number | Player | Position | Height (m) | Weight (kg) | Birth date |
|---|---|---|---|---|---|
| 2 | (United States) Symone Abbott | Outside Hitter | 1.86 | | 27 September 1996 (age 29) |
| 3 | (Italy) Ilaria Garzaro | Middle Blocker | 1.90 | 81 | 29 September 1986 (age 39) |
| 4 | (Netherlands) Judith Pietersen | Opposite | 1.88 | | 3 July 1989 (age 36) |
| 5 | (Belgium) Laura Heyrman | Middle Blocker | 1.88 | 74 | 17 May 1993 (age 32) |
| 6 | (Italy) Giulia Leonardi | Libero | 1.65 | 58 | 1 December 1987 (age 38) |
| 7 | (Colombia) Madelaynne Montaño | Opposite | 1.85 | 68 | 6 January 1983 (age 43) |
| 8 | (Serbia) Jovana Vesović | Outside Hitter | 1.82 | 68 | 21 June 1987 (age 38) |
| 9 | (Italy) Caterina Bosetti | Outside Hitter | 1.80 | 69 | 2 February 1994 (age 31) |
| 10 | (Italy) Francesca Ferretti | Setter | 1.80 | 70 | 15 February 1984 (age 41) |
| 11 | (Italy) Camilla Mingardi | Opposite | 1.86 | | 19 October 1997 (age 28) |
| 12 | (Italy) Aurora Pistolesi | Outside Hitter | 1.86 | | 3 June 1999 (age 26) |
| 13 | (Italy) Raffaella Calloni | Middle Blocker | 1.87 | 74 | 4 May 1983 (age 42) |
| 15 | (Serbia) Mina Tomić | Opposite | 1.91 | 75 | 13 May 1994 (age 31) |
| 16 | (Italy) Giulia Pincerato | Setter | 1.82 | 68 | 16 March 1987 (age 38) |
| 17 | (Croatia) Katarina Barun | Opposite | 1.94 | 75 | 1 December 1983 (age 42) |
| 18 | (Italy) Veronica Bisconti | Libero | 1.74 | 62 | 27 January 1991 (age 34) |

2016–2017 Team
| Number | Player | Position | Height (m) | Weight (kg) | Birth date |
|---|---|---|---|---|---|
| 1 | (Italy) Valeria Caracuta | Setter | 1.73 | 61 | 14 December 1987 (age 38) |
| 2 | (Serbia) Jovana Brakočević | Opposite | 1.96 | 82 | 5 March 1988 (age 37) |
| 3 | (Netherlands) Yvon Beliën | Middle Blocker | 1.88 | 74 | 28 December 1993 (age 32) |
| 4 | (Italy) Federica Valeriano | Outside Hitter | 1.79 | 69 | 15 October 1985 (age 40) |
| 5 | (Belgium) Laura Heyrman | Middle Blocker | 1.88 | 74 | 17 May 1993 (age 32) |
| 6 | (Italy) Giulia Leonardi | Libero | 1.65 | 58 | 1 December 1987 (age 38) |
| 7 | (Italy) Francesca Marcon | Outside Hitter | 1.80 | 69 | 9 July 1983 (age 42) |
| 9 | (Italy) Caterina Bosetti | Outside Hitter | 1.80 | 69 | 2 February 1994 (age 31) |
| 10 | (Italy) Francesca Ferretti | Setter | 1.80 | 70 | 15 February 1984 (age 41) |
| 11 | (Italy) Alessandra Petrucci | Setter | 1.85 | 73 | 11 February 1983 (age 42) |
| 13 | (Turkey) Neriman Özsoy | Outside Hitter | 1.88 | 74 | 13 July 1988 (age 37) |
| 14 | (Italy) Marika Bianchini | Outside Hitter | 1.78 | 69 | 23 April 1993 (age 32) |
| 18 | (Italy) Ilaria Garzaro | Middle Blocker | 1.90 | 81 | 29 September 1986 (age 39) |

== Honours ==
=== National competitions ===
- National League: 2

2012–13, 2013–14

- Coppa Italia: 2

2012–13, 2013–14

- Italian Super Cup: 2

2013, 2014
