= Italian Women's Volleyball League =

Highest women's volleyball league in Italy

Women's Volleyball Serie A1
- Current season, competition or edition: 2026–27 Italian Women's Volleyball League
- Sport: Volleyball
- Founded: 1946; 80 years ago
- Administrator: FIPAV
- No. of teams: 14
- Country: Italy
- Confederation: CEV
- Most recent champion: Imoco Volley Conegliano (2025–26)
- Most titles: Teodora Ravenna (11 titles)
- Broadcasters: Rai Sport; Sky Sport
- Streaming partner: Volleyball World TV
- Relegation to: Serie A2
- International cups: CEV Champions League; CEV Cup; CEV Challenge Cup
- Website: legavolleyfemminile.it

The Italian Women's Volleyball League Serie A1 (Italian: Lega Pallavolo Serie A Femminile), is the highest women's volleyball league in Italy. It is organized and administered by the Italian Volleyball Federation (FIPAV). It is considered one of the oldest women's top national leagues in European volleyball, being established in 1946, and its clubs have achieved significant success in the continental European club competitions.

== Format ==
The league was originally played in a single round-robin format, with all clubs placed in a single group. As more clubs joined the league, the format changed to an initial stage composed of various groups with clubs advancing to a final group for the title. In 1983 a play-off format was introduced, with all clubs playing a regular season in a single group and the best teams advancing to the play-offs.

== Teams ==
Teams of the 2026–27 season.

Club	Venue	Capacity	City/Area	Club locations in Italy (2026–27 season).
CBF Balducci HR Macerata	PalaFontescodella	2,100	Macerata	Club locations in Italy (2026–27 season).
CDA Volley Talmassons FVG	Palasport Latisana	1,500	Latisana	Club locations in Italy (2026–27 season).
ChorusLife Volley Bergamo	PalaFacchetti	2,880	Treviglio	Club locations in Italy (2026–27 season).
Granda Volley Cuneo	PalaCastagnaretta	4,700	Cuneo	Club locations in Italy (2026–27 season).
Igor Gorgonzola Novara	Pala Igor Gorgonzola	4,000	Novara	Club locations in Italy (2026–27 season).
Il Bisonte Firenze	PalaWanny	3,500	Florence	Club locations in Italy (2026–27 season).
Laica Cioccolato UYBA	E-Work Arena	4,490	Busto Arsizio	Club locations in Italy (2026–27 season).
Megabox Ondulati Del Savio Vallefoglia	PalaMegabox	2,001	Pesaro	Club locations in Italy (2026–27 season).
Numia Vero Volley Milano	Allianz Cloud Arena	5,309	Milan	Club locations in Italy (2026–27 season).
Omag Consolini Volley 1907	PalaCervia	2,000	Cervia	Club locations in Italy (2026–27 season).
Prosecco Doc A.Carraro Imoco Conegliano	PalaVerde	5,344	Villorba	Club locations in Italy (2026–27 season).
Reale Mutua Fenera Chieri '76	PalaFenera	1,506	Chieri	Club locations in Italy (2026–27 season).
Savino Del Bene Scandicci	PalaWanny	3,500	Florence	Club locations in Italy (2026–27 season).
Valsabbina Millenium Brescia	PalaGeorge	4,000	Montichiari	Club locations in Italy (2026–27 season).

== Results ==
Season	Winner	Runner-up	Third
1946	Amatori Bergamo		
1947	Amatori Bergamo		
1948	Invicta Trieste		
1949	Invicta Trieste	Fari Bergamo	Lega Nazionale Trieste
1950	Lega Nazionale Trieste	Fari Bergamo	Invicta Trieste
1951	Fari Brescia	Invicta Trieste	Lega Nazionale Trieste
1952	Fari Brescia	Invicta Trieste	Pavoniana Brescia
1953	Audax Modena	Fari Brescia	Amatori Bergamo
1954	Minelli Modena	Audax Modena	Assi Reggio Emilia
1955	Minelli Modena	Audax Modena	Amatori Bergamo
1956	Avis Audax Modena	Minelli Modena	Libertas Palermo
1957	Audax Modena	Minelli Modena	Rizzoli Milano
1958	Audax Modena	Rizzoli Milano	Indomita Modena
1959	Audax Modena	Spes Trieste	Indomita Modena
1960	Casa Lampada Trieste	Saves Alessandria	Sestese Sesto Fiorentino
1961	Casa Lampada Trieste	Saves Alessandria	Muratori Vignola
1962	Casa Lampada Trieste	Muratori Vignola	Minelli Modena
1962–63	Muratori Vignola	Minelli Modena	Sestese Sesto Fiorentino
1963–64	UISP Sesto Fiorentino	Muratori Vignola	Minelli Modena
1964–65	Max Mara Reggio Emilia	Cabassi Modena	Muratori Vignola
1965–66	Max Mara Reggio Emilia	Minelli Modena	Cabassi Modena
1966–67	Max Mara Reggio Emilia	Minelli Modena	Fini Modena
1967–68	Max Mara Reggio Emilia	Fini Modena	Cabassi Modena
1968–69	Fini Modena	Max Mara Reggio Emilia	CUS Parma
1969–70	Fini Modena	CUS Parma	Cimurri Reggio Emilia
1970–71	CUS Parma	Fini Modena	Casagrande Sacile
1971–72	Fini Modena	Bartoli Reggio Emilia	CUS Parma
1972–73	Fini Modena	Bartoli Reggio Emilia	CUS Parma
1973–74	Valdagna Scandicci	Orlandini Reggio Emilia	CUS Parma
1974–75	Valdagna Scandicci	Coma Modena	Alzano Bergamo
1975–76	Valdagna Scandicci	Burro Giglio Reggio Emilia	Alzano Bergamo
1976–77	Alzano Bergamo	Metauro Fano	Torre Tabita Catania
1977–78	Burro Giglio Reggio Emilia	Pallavolo Cecina	Savoia Alzano Lombardo
1978–79	2000 Uno Bari	Nelsen Reggio Emilia	Mec Sport Alzano Lombardo
1979–80	Alidea Catania	Nelsen Reggio Emilia	Pallavolo Cecina
1980–81	Diana Docks Ravenna	Nelsen Reggio Emilia	Mec Sport Bergamo
1981–82	Diana Docks Ravenna	Nelsen Reggio Emilia	Coma Modena
1982–83	Teodora Ravenna	Nelsen Reggio Emilia	Civ&Civ Modena
1983–84	Teodora Ravenna	Victor Village Bari	Acqua Lynx Parma; Nelsen Reggio Emilia
1984–85	Teodora Ravenna	Nelsen Reggio Emilia	Yoghi Ancona; VBC Cassano d'Adda
1985–86	Teodora Ravenna	Civ&Civ Modena	Nelsen Reggio Emilia; 2000 Uno Bari
1986–87	Teodora Ravenna	Civ&Civ Modena	Yoghi Ancona; Nelsen Reggio Emilia
1987–88	Teodora Ravenna	Civ&Civ Modena	Braglia Reggio Emilia; Vini Doc di Puglia Bari
1988–89	Teodora Ravenna	Crocodile San Lazzaro di Savena	Lagostina Reggio Calabria; Assovini Telenorba Bari
1989–90	Teodora Ravenna	Braglia Reggio Emilia	Popolare Pescopagano Matera; Edilfornaciai San Lazzaro di Savena
1990–91	Il Messaggero Ravenna	Imet Perugia	
1991–92	Calia Salotti Matera	Rasimelli&Coletti Perugia	
1992–93	Latte Rugiada Matera	Il Messaggero Ravenna	Guadagni Impresem Agrigento; Brummel Ancona
1993–94	Latte Rugiada Matera	Isola Verde Modena	Teodora Ravenna; Impresem Agrigento
1994–95	Latte Rugiada Matera	Anthesis Modena	OTC Ravenna; Fincres Roma
1995–96	Foppapedretti Bergamo	Anthesis Modena	Alpam Roma; Tra.De.Co. Altamura
1996–97	Foppapedretti Bergamo	Anthesis Modena	CerMagica Reggio Emilia; Medinex Reggio Calabria
1997–98	Foppapedretti Bergamo	CerMagica Reggio Emilia	Assid Ester Napoli; Cemar Spezzano Fiorano
1998–99	Foppapedretti Bergamo	Medinex Reggio Calabria	Omnitel Modena; Despar Perugia
1999–00	Phone Limited Modena	Medinex Reggio Calabria	Despar Perugia; Cosme Ceis Vicenza
2000–01	Not assigned	Radio 105 Foppapedretti Bergamo	Mirabilandia Teodora Ravenna; Edison Modena
2001–02	Radio 105 Foppapedretti Bergamo	Asystel Novara	Despar Colussi Perugia; Metodo Minetti Vicenza
2002–03	Despar Perugia	Asystel Novara	Monte Schiavo Banca Marche Jesi; Radio 105 Foppapedretti Bergamo
2003–04	Radio 105 Foppapedretti Bergamo	Asystel Novara	Monte Schiavo Banca Marche Jesi; Volley Modena
2004–05	Despar Perugia	Radio 105 Foppapedretti Bergamo	Bigmat Kerakoll Chieri; Monte Schiavo Banca Marche Jesi
2005–06	Radio 105 Foppapedretti Bergamo	Monte Schiavo Banca Marche Jesi	Scavolini Pesaro; Sant'Orsola Asystel Novara
2006–07	Despar Perugia	Monte Schiavo Banca Marche Jesi	Sant'Orsola Asystel Novara; Scavolini Pesaro
2007–08	Scavolini Pesaro	Despar Perugia	Foppapedretti Bergamo; Asystel Volley Novara
2008–09	Scavolini Pesaro	Asystel Volley Novara	Foppapedretti Bergamo; Yamamay Busto Arsizio
2009–10	Scavolini Pesaro	MC Carnaghi Villa Cortese	Foppapedretti Bergamo; Monte Schiavo Banca Marche Jesi
2010–11	Norda Foppapedretti Bergamo	MC Carnaghi Villa Cortese	Yamamay Busto Arsizio; Asystel Volley Novara
2011–12	Yamamay Busto Arsizio	MC Carnaghi Villa Cortese	Rebecchi Nordmeccanica Piacenza; Norda Foppapedretti Bergamo
2012–13	Rebecchi Nordmeccanica Piacenza	Imoco Volley Conegliano	Unendo Yamamay Busto Arsizio; Foppapedretti Bergamo
2013–14	Rebecchi Nordmeccanica Piacenza	Unendo Yamamay Busto Arsizio	Imoco Volley Conegliano; Igor Gorgonzola Novara
2014–15	Pomì Casalmaggiore	Igor Gorgonzola Novara	Nordmeccanica Rebecchi Piacenza; Imoco Volley Conegliano
2015–16	Imoco Volley Conegliano	Nordmeccanica Piacenza	Liu Jo Modena; Foppapedretti Bergamo
2016–17	Igor Gorgonzola Novara	Liu Jo Nordmeccanica Modena	Imoco Volley Conegliano; Pomì Casalmaggiore
2017–18	Imoco Volley Conegliano	Igor Gorgonzola Novara	Savino Del Bene Scandicci; Unet E-Work Busto Arsizio
2018–19	Imoco Volley Conegliano	Igor Gorgonzola Novara	Savino Del Bene Scandicci; ProVictoria Monza
2019–20	Cancelled due to COVID-19 pandemic		
2020–21	Imoco Volley Conegliano	Igor Gorgonzola Novara	ProVictoria Monza; Savino Del Bene Scandicci
2021–22	Imoco Volley Conegliano	ProVictoria Monza	Savino Del Bene Scandicci; Igor Gorgonzola Novara
2022–23	Imoco Volley Conegliano	Vero Volley Milano	Savino Del Bene Scandicci; Igor Gorgonzola Novara
2023–24	Imoco Volley Conegliano	Savino Del Bene Scandicci	Vero Volley Milano; Igor Gorgonzola Novara
2024–25	Imoco Volley Conegliano	Vero Volley Milano	Savino Del Bene Scandicci; Igor Gorgonzola Novara
2025–26	Imoco Volley Conegliano	Vero Volley Milano	Savino Del Bene Scandicci; Igor Gorgonzola Novara

- Note: Since a play-off format without a third place match was introduced in the 1983–84 season, the column "Third" in the table display the two losing playoffs semifinalists, with the club having the best regular season record appearing first.

Sources: Federazione Italiana Pallavolo (for champions), Lega Pallavolo Serie A Femminile (for champions and play-offs) and The-Sports.org (for runners-up and third places)

== Titles by club ==
Rk	Club	Titles	Champions Years
1	Teodora Pallavolo Ravenna	11	1980–81, 1981–82, 1982–83, 1983–84, 1984–85, 1985–86, 1986–87, 1987–88, 1988–89, 1989–90, 1990–91
2	Imoco Volley Conegliano	9	2015–16, 2017–18, 2018–19, 2020–21, 2021–22, 2022–23, 2023–24, 2024–25, 2025–26
3	Volley Bergamo	8	1995–96, 1996–97, 1997–98, 1998–99, 2001–02, 2003–04, 2005–06, 2010–11
4	Audax Modena	5	1953, 1956, 1957, 1958, 1959
5	Pallavolo Reggio Emilia	4	1964–65, 1965–66, 1966–67, 1967–68
=	Gruppo Sportivo Fini Modena	4	1968–69, 1969–70, 1971–72, 1972–73
=	Pallavolo Femminile Matera	4	1991–92, 1992–93, 1993–94, 1994–95
8	Spes Trieste	3	1960, 1961, 1962
=	Club Sportivo Robur	3	1973–74, 1974–75, 1975–76
=	Pallavolo Sirio Perugia	3	2002–03, 2004–05, 2006–07
=	Robursport Volley Pesaro	3	2007–08, 2008–09, 2009–10
12	Amatori Bergamo	2	1946, 1947
=	Invicta Trieste	2	1948, 1949
=	Fari Brescia	2	1951, 1952
=	Indomita Modena	2	1954, 1955
=	River Volley	2	2012–13, 2013–14
17	Libertas Trieste	1	1950
=	Gruppo Sportivo Muratori Vignola	1	1962–63
=	Sestese Volley	1	1963–64
=	CUS Parma	1	1970–71
=	Pallavolo Alzano Lombardo	1	1976–77
=	Arbor Reggio Emilia	1	1977–78
=	Amatori Volley Bari	1	1978–79
=	Alidea Catania	1	1979–80
=	Volley Modena	1	1999–00
=	Futura Volley Busto Arsizio	1	2011–12
=	Volleyball Casalmaggiore	1	2014–15
=	Igor Gorgonzola Novara	1	2016–17

== All-time team records ==
Winners and finalists by city since 1945/1946:

Location	Winners	Finalists
Modena	12	19
Ravenna	11	1
Bergamo	10	4
Trieste	6	3
Reggio Emilia	5	13
Conegliano	5	1
Matera	4	0
Perugia	3	1
Pesaro	3	0
Scandicci	3	0
Brescia	2	1
Piacenza	2	1
Novara	1	8
Vignola	1	2
Reggio di Calabria	1	2
Parma	1	1
Bari	1	1
Busto Arsizio	1	1
Alzano Lombardo	1	0
Florence	1	0
Catania	1	0
Casalmaggiore	1	0
Villa Cortese		3
Alessandria		2
Jesi		2
Cerro Veronese		1
Milano		1
Fano		1
San Lazzaro di Savena		1
Monza		1

Since 2009/10:

Number of appearances
1	Busto Arsizio	13
2	Imoco Volley Conegliano	13
3	Volley Bergamo	13
4	Casalmaggiore	9
5	IG Novara Trecate	9
6	San Casciano - Il Bisonte .	8
7	Savino Del Bene Scandicci	8
8	Nordmeccanica Piacenza	7
9	Robur Tiboni Urbino	6
10	Saugella Team Monza	6

Number of matches
1	Imoco Volley Conegliano	313
2	Busto Arsizio	311
3	Volley Bergamo	304
4	IG Novara Trecate	228
5	Casalmaggiore	203
6	Nordmeccanica Piacenza	188
7	Savino Del Bene Scandicci	181
8	San Casciano - Il Bisonte .	172
9	Robur Tiboni Urbino	138
10	LJ Volley Modena	131

Wins
1	Imoco Volley Conegliano	216
2	Busto Arsizio	191
3	IG Novara Trecate	161
4	Volley Bergamo	157
5	Nordmeccanica Piacenza	112
6	Casalmaggiore	109
7	Savino Del Bene Scandicci	109
8	Villa Cortese	79
9	LJ Volley Modena	72
10	Saugella Team Monza	72

Number of wins in games played
1	IG Novara Trecate	71 %
2	Imoco Volley Conegliano	69 %
3	Villa Cortese	66 %
4	Scavolini Pesaro	62 %
5	Busto Arsizio	61 %
6	Nordmeccanica Piacenza	60 %
7	Savino Del Bene Scandicci	60 %
8	Saugella Team Monza	56 %
9	LJ Volley Modena	55 %
10	Pieralisi Jesi	55 %

(Based on W=2 pts and D=1 pts)

	Team	S	Firs	Best	Pts	MP	W	L	GF	GA	diff
1	Imoco Volley Conegliano	13	2009/2010	1st	529	313	216	97	738	424	+314
2	Busto Arsizio	13	2009/2010	1st	502	311	191	120	677	500	+177
3	Volley Bergamo	13	2009/2010	1st	461	304	157	147	605	578	+27
4	IG Novara Trecate	9	2013/2014	1st	389	228	161	67	549	310	+239
5	Casalmaggiore	9	2013/2014	1st	312	203	109	94	408	372	+36
6	Nordmeccanica Piacenza	7	2009/2010	1st	300	188	112	76	395	309	+86
7	Savino Del Bene Scandicci	8	2014/2015	-	290	181	109	72	395	307	+88
8	San Casciano - Il Bisonte Firenze	8	2014/2015	-	235	172	63	109	273	386	-113
9	LJ Volley Modena	5	2013/2014	2nd	203	131	72	59	275	233	+42
10	Saugella Team Monza	6	2016/2017	-	200	128	72	56	266	233	+33
11	Villa Cortese	4	2009/2010	2nd	198	119	79	40	281	190	+91
12	Robur Tiboni Urbino	6	2009/2010	-	198	138	60	78	237	280	-43
13	Scavolini Pesaro	4	2009/2010	1st	172	106	66	40	240	171	+69
14	Asystel Novara	3	2009/2010	-	119	79	40	39	147	154	-7
15	Cuneo Granda Volley	4	2018/2019	-	102	71	31	40	121	157	-36
16	Chieri '76	4	2018/2019	-	101	72	29	43	121	153	-32
17	Montichiari F.	3	2014/2015	-	97	68	29	39	117	140	-23
18	Universal Modena	3	2010/2011	-	92	63	29	34	121	119	+2
19	Millenium Brescia	3	2018/2019	-	89	68	21	47	102	163	-61
20	Filottrano	3	2017/2018	-	83	65	18	47	75	163	-88
21	Pavia	3	2009/2010	-	80	69	11	58	75	187	-112
22	Club Italia Rome	3	2015/2016	-	80	70	10	60	70	191	-121
23	Sirio Perugia	2	2009/2010	-	73	51	22	29	91	113	-22
24	Forlì Bologna	3	2012/2013	-	68	64	4	60	43	184	-141
25	Castellana Grotte	2	2009/2010	-	65	48	17	31	76	113	-37
26	Chieri Volley	2	2011/2012	-	61	44	17	27	71	101	-30
27	Perugia Volley	3	2019/2020	-	61	47	14	33	67	116	-49
28	Sudtirol Bolzano	2	2015/2016	-	61	48	13	35	64	116	-52
29	Pieralisi Jesi	1	2009/2010	-	45	29	16	13	59	52	+7
30	Volley Pesaro	1	2017/2018	-	34	24	10	14	40	50	-10
31	Trentino Rosa	2	2020/2021	-	34	26	8	18	36	61	-25
32	OR Vicenza	1	2015/2016	-	31	24	7	17	30	59	-29
33	Cuatto Volley Giaveno	1	2012/2013	-	29	24	5	19	30	62	-32
34	Ornavasso	1	2013/2014	-	27	20	7	13	30	43	-13
35	Sab Grima Legnano	1	2017/2018	-	27	22	5	17	24	57	-33
36	Parma	1	2011/2012	-	26	20	6	14	28	49	-21
37	Frosinone	1	2013/2014	-	24	20	4	16	21	50	-29
38	VolAlto Caserta	1	2019/2020	-	21	19	2	17	18	51	-33
39	Crema Volley	1	2012/2013	-	15	11	4	7	15	26	-11
40	Flero Mazzano	2	2014/2015	-	4	4	0	4	4	12	-8
