= 2013 Women's European Volleyball Championship squads =

This article shows all participating team squads at the 2013 Women's European Volleyball Championship, held in Germany and Switzerland from 6 to 14 September 2013.

== Pool A ==
=== Germany ===
- Head coach: Giovanni Guidetti

№	Name	Date of birth	Height	Weight	2013 club
1	Lenka Dürr	10 December 1990	171 cm (5 ft 7 in)	59 cm (1 ft 11 in)	(Germany) Raben Vilsbiburg
2	Kathleen Weiß	2 February 1984	171 cm (5 ft 7 in)	66 cm (2 ft 2 in)	(Italy) Volley Bergamo
3	Denise Hanke	31 August 1989	179 cm (5 ft 10 in)	58 cm (1 ft 11 in)	(Germany) Schweriner SC
4	Maren Brinker	10 July 1986	184 cm (6 ft 0 in)	68 cm (2 ft 3 in)	(Italy) FV Busto Arsizio
5	Anja Brandt	15 February 1990	195 cm (6 ft 5 in)	77 cm (2 ft 6 in)	(Germany) Schweriner SC
6	Jennifer Geerties	5 April 1994	186 cm (6 ft 1 in)	58 cm (1 ft 11 in)	(Germany) Olympia Berlin
7	Jana Franziska Poll	7 May 1988	184 cm (6 ft 0 in)	69 cm (2 ft 3 in)	(Germany) MTV Stuttgart
9	Corina Ssuschke	9 May 1983	189 cm (6 ft 2 in)	75 cm (2 ft 6 in)	(Azerbaijan) Lokomotiv Baku
11	Christiane Fürst	29 March 1985	192 cm (6 ft 4 in)	76 cm (2 ft 6 in)	(Turkey) VakıfGüneş Istanbul
12	Heike Beier	9 December 1983	184 cm (6 ft 0 in)	73 cm (2 ft 5 in)	(Italy) VB Casalmaggiore
13	Saskia Hippe	16 January 1991	185 cm (6 ft 1 in)	76 cm (2 ft 6 in)	(Czech Republic) VK Prostějov
14	Margareta Kozuch	30 October 1986	187 cm (6 ft 2 in)	70 cm (2 ft 4 in)	(Italy) FV Busto Arsizio
15	Lisa Thomsen	20 August 1985	172 cm (5 ft 8 in)	68 cm (2 ft 3 in)	(Germany) Schweriner SC
20	Lisa Izquierdo	29 August 1989	178 cm (5 ft 10 in)	78 cm (2 ft 7 in)	(Germany) Dresdner SC

=== Netherlands ===
- Head coach: Gido Vermeulen

№	Name	Date of birth	Height	Weight	2013 club
2	Femke Stoltenborg	30 July 1991	190 cm (6 ft 3 in)	79 cm (2 ft 7 in)	(Germany) VT Hamburg
3	Yvon Beliën	28 December 1993	188 cm (6 ft 2 in)	70 cm (2 ft 4 in)	(Netherlands) Volleybalclub Weert
4	Celeste Plak	26 October 1995	190 cm (6 ft 3 in)	84 cm (2 ft 9 in)	(Netherlands) Alterno Apeldoorn
5	Robin de Kruijf	5 May 1991	193 cm (6 ft 4 in)	79 cm (2 ft 7 in)	(Germany) Dresdner SC
6	Maret Grothues	16 September 1988	180 cm (5 ft 11 in)	68 cm (2 ft 3 in)	(Azerbaijan) Lokomotiv Baku
7	Quinta Steenbergen	2 April 1985	189 cm (6 ft 2 in)	74 cm (2 ft 5 in)	(Germany) Schweriner SC
8	Judith Pietersen	3 July 1989	188 cm (6 ft 2 in)	73 cm (2 ft 5 in)	(Germany) Dresdner SC
11	Anne Buijs	2 February 1991	191 cm (6 ft 3 in)	75 cm (2 ft 6 in)	(Germany) Schweriner SC
12	Manon Flier	8 February 1984	192 cm (6 ft 4 in)	70 cm (2 ft 4 in)	(Azerbaijan) Azərreyl Baku
14	Laura Dijkema	18 February 1990	184 cm (6 ft 0 in)	73 cm (2 ft 5 in)	(Germany) USC Münster
16	Kim Renkema	26 August 1987	179 cm (5 ft 10 in)	70 cm (2 ft 4 in)	(Italy) Pallavolo Pavia
19	Kirsten Knip	14 September 1992	176 cm (5 ft 9 in)	73 cm (2 ft 5 in)	(Netherlands) Sliedrecht Sport

=== Spain ===
- Head coach: Francisco Hervás

№	Name	Date of birth	Height	Weight	2013 club
1	Rocío Gómez	30 December 1987	189 cm (6 ft 2 in)		(Belgium) Oxyjeunes Farciennes
2	Silvia Araco	12 August 1989	170 cm (5 ft 7 in)		(Spain) CV Haro
3	María Isabel Fernández	6 September 1982	178 cm (5 ft 10 in)		(Spain) CV Murillo
5	Milagros Collar	15 April 1988	184 cm (6 ft 0 in)		(France) ES Le Cannet
6	Ana Correa	19 January 1985	187 cm (6 ft 2 in)		(France) Béziers Volley
8	Diana Sánchez	7 March 1977	181 cm (5 ft 11 in)		(Spain) Aguere S. Cristóbal
9	Patricia Aranda	27 June 1979	182 cm (6 ft 0 in)		(Spain) Béziers Volley
10	Diana Castaño	5 April 1983	170 cm (5 ft 7 in)		(Belgium) Dauphines Charleroi
11	Encarnación García	4 October 1979	181 cm (5 ft 11 in)		(Spain) Vóley Murcia
15	Mireya Delgado	5 November 1991	180 cm (5 ft 11 in)		(France) Stella ES Calais
16	Jéssica Rivero	15 March 1995	180 cm (5 ft 11 in)		(Spain) CV Haro
17	María Segura	10 June 1992	182 cm (6 ft 0 in)		(Spain) CV Barcelona

=== Turkey ===
- Head coach: Massimo Barbolini

№	Name	Date of birth	Height	Weight	2013 club
1	Güldeniz Önal	25 March 1986	180 cm (5 ft 11 in)	67 cm (2 ft 2 in)	(Turkey) VakıfGüneş Istanbul
2	Aslı Kalaç	13 December 1995	183 cm (6 ft 0 in)	73 cm (2 ft 5 in)	(Turkey) Yeşilyurt SK
3	Gizem Güreşen	14 January 1987	178 cm (5 ft 10 in)	70 cm (2 ft 4 in)	(Turkey) VakıfGüneş Istanbul
4	Birgül Güler	2 May 1990	178 cm (5 ft 10 in)	68 cm (2 ft 3 in)	(Turkey) Nilüfer Bursa
5	Ergül Avcı	24 July 1987	190 cm (6 ft 3 in)	75 cm (2 ft 6 in)	(Turkey) VakıfGüneş Istanbul
6	Polen Uslupehlivan	27 August 1990	190 cm (6 ft 3 in)	65 cm (2 ft 2 in)	(Turkey) VakıfGüneş Istanbul
7	Seda Tokatlıoğlu	26 June 1986	192 cm (6 ft 4 in)	80 cm (2 ft 7 in)	(Turkey) Fenerbahçe SK
8	Bahar Toksoy	6 February 1988	190 cm (6 ft 3 in)	68 cm (2 ft 3 in)	(Turkey) VakıfGüneş Istanbul
9	Özge Kırdar	26 June 1985	183 cm (6 ft 0 in)	70 cm (2 ft 4 in)	(Turkey) Eczacıbaşı Istanbul
10	Gözde Kırdar	26 June 1985	183 cm (6 ft 0 in)	70 cm (2 ft 4 in)	(Turkey) VakıfGüneş Istanbul
11	Naz Aydemir	14 August 1990	185 cm (6 ft 1 in)	68 cm (2 ft 3 in)	(Turkey) VakıfGüneş Istanbul
12	Dilara Bağcı	2 February 1994	162 cm (5 ft 4 in)	62 cm (2 ft 0 in)	(Turkey) Bursa BB
16	Büşra Cansu	16 July 1990	185 cm (6 ft 1 in)	69 cm (2 ft 3 in)	(Turkey) Eczacıbaşı Istanbul
17	Neslihan Demir	9 December 1983	187 cm (6 ft 2 in)	72 cm (2 ft 4 in)	(Turkey) Eczacıbaşı Istanbul

== Pool B ==
=== Belgium ===
- Head coach: Gert Vande Broek

№	Name	Date of birth	Height	Weight	2013 club
1	Nina Coolman	25 January 1991	180 cm (5 ft 11 in)		(Belgium) Asterix Kieldrecht
2	Britt Ruysschaert	27 May 1994	174 cm (5 ft 9 in)		(Belgium) Asterix Kieldrecht
3	Frauke Dirickx	3 January 1980	185 cm (6 ft 1 in)		(Poland) MKS Dąbrowa Górn.
4	Valérie Courtois	1 November 1990	172 cm (5 ft 8 in)		(Belgium) VC Oudegem
5	Laura Heyrman	17 May 1993	186 cm (6 ft 1 in)		(Germany) Dresdner SC
6	Charlotte Leys	18 March 1989	186 cm (6 ft 1 in)		(Poland) MKS Dąbrowa Górn.
9	Freya Aelbrecht	10 February 1990	186 cm (6 ft 1 in)		(France) RC Cannes
10	Lise Van Hecke	1 July 1992	187 cm (6 ft 2 in)		(Italy) Tiboni Urbino
11	Els Vandesteene	30 May 1987	186 cm (6 ft 1 in)		(Germany) VT Hamburg
12	Angie Bland	26 April 1984	182 cm (6 ft 0 in)		(Germany) Alemannia Aachen
14	Hélène Rousseaux	25 September 1991	188 cm (6 ft 2 in)		(Poland) MKS Muszyna
16	Jasmien Biebauw	23 September 1990	180 cm (5 ft 11 in)		(Belgium) VC Oudegem
17	Ilka Van de Vyver	26 January 1993	170 cm (5 ft 7 in)		(France) RC Cannes
19	Lore Gillis	29 November 1988	188 cm (6 ft 2 in)		(Belgium) VC Oudegem

=== France ===
- Head coach: Fabrice Vial

№	Name	Date of birth	Height	Weight	2013 club
1	Myriam Kloster	4 August 1989	188 cm (6 ft 2 in)	74 cm (2 ft 5 in)	(France) Vennelles VB
2	Astrid Souply	21 July 1993	191 cm (6 ft 3 in)	80 cm (2 ft 7 in)	(France) Amiens Volley
4	Christina Bauer	1 January 1988	196 cm (6 ft 5 in)	85 cm (2 ft 9 in)	(Italy) FV Busto Arsizio
7	Alexandra Jupiter	11 March 1990	190 cm (6 ft 3 in)		(Puerto Rico) Criollas de Caguas
8	Leyla Tuifua	17 October 1986	178 cm (5 ft 10 in)	74 cm (2 ft 5 in)	(France) Vennelles VB
9	Anna Rybaczewski	23 March 1982	186 cm (6 ft 1 in)	75 cm (2 ft 6 in)	(France) ASPTT Mulhouse
10	Maëva Orlé	8 May 1991	184 cm (6 ft 0 in)	72 cm (2 ft 4 in)	(France) ES Le Cannet
12	Déborah Ortschitt	10 June 1987	165 cm (5 ft 5 in)	58 cm (1 ft 11 in)	(France) ASPTT Mulhouse
14	Mallory Steux	24 October 1988	171 cm (5 ft 7 in)	62 cm (2 ft 0 in)	(France) ES Le Cannet
16	Hélène Schleck	13 May 1986	181 cm (5 ft 11 in)	68 cm (2 ft 3 in)	(France) Béziers Volley
17	Élisabeth Fedèle	11 January 1994	175 cm (5 ft 9 in)	70 cm (2 ft 4 in)	(France) ES Le Cannet
18	Alexandra Rochelle	14 December 1983	168 cm (5 ft 6 in)	65 cm (2 ft 2 in)	(France) Béziers Volley

=== Italy ===
- Head coach: Marco Mencarelli

№	Name	Date of birth	Height	Weight	2013 club
1	Indre Sorokaite	5 July 1988	188 cm (6 ft 2 in)	84 cm (2 ft 9 in)	(Azerbaijan) Azərreyl Baku
2	Cristina Barcellini	20 November 1986	183 cm (6 ft 0 in)	78 cm (2 ft 7 in)	(Italy) Imoco Conegliano
3	Noemi Signorile	15 February 1990	182 cm (6 ft 0 in)	74 cm (2 ft 5 in)	(Italy) Robursport Pesaro
4	Letizia Camera	1 October 1992	175 cm (5 ft 9 in)	63 cm (2 ft 1 in)	(Italy) Imoco Conegliano
6	Monica De Gennaro	8 January 1987	174 cm (5 ft 9 in)	67 cm (2 ft 2 in)	(Italy) Robursport Pesaro
7	Martina Guiggi	1 May 1984	188 cm (6 ft 2 in)	69 cm (2 ft 3 in)	(Italy) River Piacenza
9	Caterina Bosetti	2 February 1994	180 cm (5 ft 11 in)	69 cm (2 ft 3 in)	(Italy) GSO Villa Cortese
10	Raphaela Folie	7 March 1991	186 cm (6 ft 1 in)	82 cm (2 ft 8 in)	(Italy) GSO Villa Cortese
13	Valentina Arrighetti	26 January 1985	189 cm (6 ft 2 in)	73 cm (2 ft 5 in)	(Italy) FV Busto Arsizio
16	Lucia Bosetti	9 July 1989	176 cm (5 ft 9 in)	59 cm (1 ft 11 in)	(Italy) River Piacenza
17	Valentina Diouf	10 January 1993	202 cm (6 ft 8 in)	89 cm (2 ft 11 in)	(Italy) Volley Bergamo
18	Carolina Costagrande	15 October 1980	188 cm (6 ft 2 in)	80 cm (2 ft 7 in)	(China) Guangdong Hengda
19	Cristina Chirichella	10 February 1994	195 cm (6 ft 5 in)	73 cm (2 ft 5 in)	(Italy) Robursport Pesaro
20	Alessia Gennari	3 November 1991	184 cm (6 ft 0 in)	68 cm (2 ft 3 in)	(Italy) Chieri Torino VC

=== Switzerland ===
- Head coach: Svetlana Ilić

№	Name	Date of birth	Height	Weight	2013 club
1	Kristel Marbach	14 November 1988	180 cm (5 ft 11 in)	70 cm (2 ft 4 in)	(Switzerland) Voléro Zürich
3	Laura Sirucek	5 April 1990	177 cm (5 ft 10 in)	70 cm (2 ft 4 in)	(Switzerland) Kanti Schaffhausen
4	Elena Steinemann	8 December 1994	178 cm (5 ft 10 in)	68 cm (2 ft 3 in)	(Switzerland) Kanti Schaffhausen
5	Martina Halter	9 May 1994	190 cm (6 ft 3 in)	78 cm (2 ft 7 in)	(Switzerland) FC Luzern
6	Patricia Schauss	14 May 1988	188 cm (6 ft 2 in)	77 cm (2 ft 6 in)	(Switzerland) Voléro Zürich
7	Tabea Dalliard	18 July 1994	167 cm (5 ft 6 in)	62 cm (2 ft 0 in)	(Switzerland) VB Franches-Mont.
8	Sandra Stocker	26 December 1987	186 cm (6 ft 1 in)	80 cm (2 ft 7 in)	(Switzerland) Neuchâtel UCV
9	Nadine Jenny	13 June 1990	174 cm (5 ft 9 in)	60 cm (2 ft 0 in)	(Switzerland) Voléro Zürich
10	Stéphanie Bannwart	11 January 1991	184 cm (6 ft 0 in)	80 cm (2 ft 7 in)	(Switzerland) Sm'Aesch Pfeffingen
11	Mandy Wigger	4 May 1987	191 cm (6 ft 3 in)	97 cm (3 ft 2 in)	(Switzerland) Volley Köniz
12	Mélanie Pauli	5 May 1980	162 cm (5 ft 4 in)	60 cm (2 ft 0 in)	(Switzerland) Volley Köniz
13	Inès Granvorka	13 August 1991	177 cm (5 ft 10 in)	70 cm (2 ft 4 in)	(Switzerland) Voléro Zürich
16	Marina Kühner	26 April 1991	181 cm (5 ft 11 in)	65 cm (2 ft 2 in)	(Switzerland) Volley Köniz
17	Laura Unternährer	11 July 1993	177 cm (5 ft 10 in)	68 cm (2 ft 3 in)	(Switzerland) Voléro Zürich

== Pool C ==
=== Azerbaijan ===
- Head coach: Faig Garayev

№	Name	Date of birth	Height	Weight	2013 club
2	Ksenija Kovalenko	21 November 1986	190 cm (6 ft 3 in)	78 cm (2 ft 7 in)	(Azerbaijan) Azərreyl Baku
3	Anastasiya Gurbanova	4 December 1989	188 cm (6 ft 2 in)	73 cm (2 ft 5 in)	(Azerbaijan) Azəryol Baku
5	Odina Əliyeva	22 May 1990	183 cm (6 ft 0 in)	74 cm (2 ft 5 in)	(Azerbaijan) Azəryol Baku
6	Ayşən Əbdüləzimova	11 April 1993	184 cm (6 ft 0 in)	65 cm (2 ft 2 in)	(Azerbaijan) Lokomotiv Biləcəri
7	Elena Parchomenko	11 September 1982	186 cm (6 ft 1 in)	71 cm (2 ft 4 in)	(Azerbaijan) Azəryol Baku
8	Natavan Gasimova	8 July 1985	177 cm (5 ft 10 in)	61 cm (2 ft 0 in)	(Azerbaijan) Azəryol Baku
9	Natalya Məmmədova	2 December 1984	195 cm (6 ft 5 in)	78 cm (2 ft 7 in)	(Russia) Omichka Omsk
12	Valeriya Korotenko	29 January 1984	174 cm (5 ft 9 in)	62 cm (2 ft 0 in)	(Azerbaijan) Azərreyl Baku
15	Aynur Kərimova	7 December 1988	186 cm (6 ft 1 in)	71 cm (2 ft 4 in)	(Azerbaijan) Azəryol Baku
16	Oksana Kiselyova	30 May 1992	176 cm (5 ft 9 in)	64 cm (2 ft 1 in)	(Azerbaijan) Azəryol Baku
17	Polina Rəhimova	5 June 1990	198 cm (6 ft 6 in)	81 cm (2 ft 8 in)	(Azerbaijan) Azərreyl Baku
18	Shafagat Habibova	3 August 1991	178 cm (5 ft 10 in)	62 cm (2 ft 0 in)	(Azerbaijan) Azəryol Baku

=== Belarus ===
- Head coach: Viktar Hancharou

№	Name	Date of birth	Height	Weight	2013 club
1	Marina Tumas	17 September 1984	188 cm (6 ft 2 in)		(Turkey) İller Bankası Ankara
2	Volha Palcheuskaya	6 December 1984	183 cm (6 ft 0 in)	73 cm (2 ft 5 in)	(Azerbaijan) Lokomotiv Baku
4	Hanna Kalinouskaya	17 May 1985	189 cm (6 ft 2 in)		(Germany) VfB 91 Suhl
5	Vera Klimowich	29 April 1988	185 cm (6 ft 1 in)		(Azerbaijan) Lokomotiv Baku
6	Anastasiya Harelik	20 March 1991	185 cm (6 ft 1 in)	74 cm (2 ft 5 in)	(Belarus) Minchanka Minsk
7	Anna Shevchenko	14 January 1979	186 cm (6 ft 1 in)		(Belarus) Minchanka Minsk
9	Natallia Tsupranava	28 July 1988	182 cm (6 ft 0 in)		(Belarus) Neman Grodno
10	Volha Pauliukouskaya	13 July 1988	171 cm (5 ft 7 in)		(Poland) Śląska Gliwice
12	Nadzeya Malasai	14 December 1990	182 cm (6 ft 0 in)	72 cm (2 ft 4 in)	(Belarus) Atlant Baranovichi
13	Viktoryia Yemialyanchyk	30 January 1989	183 cm (6 ft 0 in)		(Kazakhstan) Zhetysu Almaty
14	Alena Burak	3 July 1993	177 cm (5 ft 10 in)		(Belarus) Minchanka Minsk
15	Tatsiana Markevitch	25 March 1988	185 cm (6 ft 1 in)		(France) RC Cannes
16	Anzhelika Barysevich	20 July 1995	192 cm (6 ft 4 in)		(Belarus) Neman Grodno
17	Kristina Mikhailenko	23 March 1992	170 cm (5 ft 7 in)		(Poland) Legion. Legionowo

=== Croatia ===
- Head coach: Igor Lovrinov

№	Name	Date of birth	Height	Weight	2013 club
1	Senna Ušić	14 May 1986	188 cm (6 ft 2 in)	80 cm (2 ft 7 in)	(Turkey) Eczacıbaşı Istanbul
2	Ana Grbac	23 March 1988	187 cm (6 ft 2 in)	82 cm (2 ft 8 in)	(Italy) FV Busto Arsizio
6	Mira Topić	2 June 1983	189 cm (6 ft 2 in)	75 cm (2 ft 6 in)	(Russia) VC Tyumen
7	Bernarda Ćutuk	22 December 1990	188 cm (6 ft 2 in)	80 cm (2 ft 7 in)	(Germany) SC Potsdam
8	Mia Jerkov	5 December 1982	190 cm (6 ft 3 in)	71 cm (2 ft 4 in)	(Turkey) Bursa BB
10	Ivana Miloš	7 March 1986	188 cm (6 ft 2 in)	71 cm (2 ft 4 in)	(Italy) Volley 2002 Forlì
11	Sanja Popović	31 May 1984	186 cm (6 ft 1 in)	80 cm (2 ft 7 in)	(Poland) MKS Muszyna
13	Samanta Fabris	8 December 1992	190 cm (6 ft 3 in)	80 cm (2 ft 7 in)	(Italy) Chieri Torino VC
15	Bernarda Brčić	12 May 1991	190 cm (6 ft 3 in)	78 cm (2 ft 7 in)	(Croatia) ŽOK Rijeka
16	Martina Malević	7 December 1990	170 cm (5 ft 7 in)	66 cm (2 ft 2 in)	(Croatia) Mladost Zagreb
17	Jelena Alajbeg	1 October 1989	183 cm (6 ft 0 in)	82 cm (2 ft 8 in)	(Russia) Severyanka Cherepovets
18	Maja Poljak	2 May 1983	194 cm (6 ft 4 in)	82 cm (2 ft 8 in)	(Turkey) Eczacıbaşı Istanbul

=== Russia ===
- Head coach: Jurij Maričev

№	Name	Date of birth	Height	Weight	2013 club
3	Daria Isaeva	29 March 1990	186 cm (6 ft 1 in)	75 cm (2 ft 6 in)	(Russia) Zarechie Odintsovo
4	Irina Zaryazhko	4 October 1991	196 cm (6 ft 5 in)	78 cm (2 ft 7 in)	(Russia) Uralochka-NTMK
5	Aleksandra Pasynkova	14 April 1987	190 cm (6 ft 3 in)	75 cm (2 ft 6 in)	(Russia) Uralochka-NTMK
6	Anna Matienko	12 July 1981	182 cm (6 ft 0 in)	68 cm (2 ft 3 in)	(Russia) Severyanka Cherepovets
7	Svetlana Kryuchkova	21 February 1985	174 cm (5 ft 9 in)	63 cm (2 ft 1 in)	(Russia) Dinamo Krasnodar
8	Nataliya Obmochaeva	1 June 1989	194 cm (6 ft 4 in)	77 cm (2 ft 6 in)	(Russia) Dinamo Moscow
10	Ekaterina Kosianenko	2 February 1990	178 cm (5 ft 10 in)	64 cm (2 ft 1 in)	(Russia) Zarechie Odintsovo
11	Victoria Rusakova	23 October 1988	188 cm (6 ft 2 in)	77 cm (2 ft 6 in)	(Russia) Uralochka-NTMK
14	Natal'ja Dianskaja	7 March 1989	185 cm (6 ft 1 in)	64 cm (2 ft 1 in)	(Russia) Severyanka Cherepovets
15	Tatiana Kosheleva	23 December 1988	191 cm (6 ft 3 in)	67 cm (2 ft 2 in)	(Russia) Dinamo Moscow
16	Iuliia Morozova	8 January 1985	192 cm (6 ft 4 in)	79 cm (2 ft 7 in)	(Russia) Dinamo Moscow
17	Natalia Malykh	18 December 1993	187 cm (6 ft 2 in)	65 cm (2 ft 2 in)	(Russia) Zarechie Odintsovo
19	Anna Malova	16 April 1990	175 cm (5 ft 9 in)	59 cm (1 ft 11 in)	(Russia) Ufimochka Ufa
20	Anastasija Šljachovaja	5 October 1990	192 cm (6 ft 4 in)	69 cm (2 ft 3 in)	(Russia) Ufimochka Ufa

== Pool D ==
=== Bulgaria ===
- Head coach: Marcello Abbondanza

№	Name	Date of birth	Height	Weight	2013 club
1	Diana Nenova	16 April 1985	180 cm (5 ft 11 in)	65 cm (2 ft 2 in)	(Azerbaijan) Lokomotiv Baku
2	Desislava Nikolova	21 December 1991	184 cm (6 ft 0 in)	68 cm (2 ft 3 in)	(Italy) Volley Soverato
4	Lora Kitipova	19 May 1991	182 cm (6 ft 0 in)	68 cm (2 ft 3 in)	(Germany) MTV Stuttgart
5	Dobriana Rabadžieva	14 June 1991	190 cm (6 ft 3 in)	72 cm (2 ft 4 in)	(Azerbaijan) Rabitə Baku
6	Tsvetelina Zarkova	18 December 1986	187 cm (6 ft 2 in)	69 cm (2 ft 3 in)	(Czech Republic) VK Prostějov
7	Gabriela Koeva	25 July 1989	188 cm (6 ft 2 in)	66 cm (2 ft 2 in)	(Turkey) Beşiktaş JK
11	Hristina Ruseva	1 October 1990	190 cm (6 ft 3 in)	77 cm (2 ft 6 in)	(Azerbaijan) Telekom Baku
12	Mariya Karakasheva	27 October 1988	182 cm (6 ft 0 in)	65 cm (2 ft 2 in)	(Romania) CSM Bucurest
13	Mariya Filipova	10 September 1982	178 cm (5 ft 10 in)	68 cm (2 ft 3 in)	(Azerbaijan) Lokomotiv Baku
14	Slavina Koleva	22 November 1986	183 cm (6 ft 0 in)	63 cm (2 ft 1 in)	(Bulgaria) CSKA Sofia
15	Zhana Todorova	6 January 1997	170 cm (5 ft 7 in)	55 cm (1 ft 10 in)	(Bulgaria) Maritza Plovdiv
16	Elitsa Vasileva	13 May 1990	190 cm (6 ft 3 in)	73 cm (2 ft 5 in)	(Brazil) Campinas VC
17	Strashimira Filipova	18 August 1985	196 cm (6 ft 5 in)	76 cm (2 ft 6 in)	(Russia) Uralochka-NTMK
18	Emiliya Nikolova	26 December 1991	188 cm (6 ft 2 in)	59 cm (1 ft 11 in)	(Italy) Imoco Conegliano

=== Czech Republic ===
- Head coach: Carlo Parisi

№	Name	Date of birth	Height	Weight	2013 club
1	Andrea Kossanyiová	6 August 1993	184 cm (6 ft 0 in)		(Czech Republic) VK Prostějov
2	Eva Hodanová	18 December 1993	189 cm (6 ft 2 in)		(Czech Republic) PVK Olymp Praga
3	Kristýna Pastulová	22 October 1985	197 cm (6 ft 6 in)		(Italy) Antares Sala Cons.
4	Aneta Havlíčková	22 December 1990	190 cm (6 ft 3 in)		(Azerbaijan) Lokomotiv Baku
5	Julie Jášová	14 September 1987	179 cm (5 ft 10 in)		(Germany) VT Hamburg
6	Lucie Smutná	14 April 1991	180 cm (5 ft 11 in)		(Germany) Köpenicker SC
9	Michaela Hasalíková	8 April 1984	186 cm (6 ft 1 in)		(Azerbaijan) Lokomotiv Baku
11	Veronika Dostálová	7 April 1992	170 cm (5 ft 7 in)		(Czech Republic) PVK Olymp Praga
13	Tereza Vanžurová	4 April 1991	184 cm (6 ft 0 in)		(Italy) AGIL Novara
17	Ivana Plchotová	28 October 1982	192 cm (6 ft 4 in)		(Poland) MKS Dąbrowa Górn.
18	Pavla Vincourová	12 November 1992	183 cm (6 ft 0 in)		(Czech Republic) VK Prostějov
20	Michaela Mlejnková	26 July 1996	194 cm (6 ft 4 in)		(Czech Republic) PVK Olymp Praga

=== Poland ===
- Head coach: Peter Makowski

№	Name	Date of birth	Height	Weight	2013 club
1	Dorota Medyńska	25 April 1993	170 cm (5 ft 7 in)	60 cm (2 ft 0 in)	(Poland) Impel Wrocław
2	Maja Tokarska	22 January 1991	194 cm (6 ft 4 in)	79 cm (2 ft 7 in)	(Poland) MKS Dąbrowa Górn.
3	Karolina Kosek	28 June 1985	183 cm (6 ft 0 in)	83 cm (2 ft 9 in)	(Turkey) Yeşilyurt SK
7	Joanna Kaczor	16 September 1984	191 cm (6 ft 3 in)	64 cm (2 ft 1 in)	(Poland) MKS Dąbrowa Górn.
8	Zuzanna Efimienko	8 August 1989	195 cm (6 ft 5 in)	72 cm (2 ft 4 in)	(Italy) Imoco Conegliano
9	Ewelina Sieczka	26 January 1988	182 cm (6 ft 0 in)	68 cm (2 ft 3 in)	(Poland) BKS Bielsko-Biała
11	Kinga Kasprzak	12 June 1987	188 cm (6 ft 2 in)	76 cm (2 ft 6 in)	(Poland) MKS Muszyna
12	Milena Sadurek	18 October 1984	178 cm (5 ft 10 in)	65 cm (2 ft 2 in)	(Azerbaijan) Azərreyl Baku
13	Paulina Maj	22 March 1987	166 cm (5 ft 5 in)	58 cm (1 ft 11 in)	(Poland) MKS Muszyna
14	Joanna Wołosz	7 April 1990	181 cm (5 ft 11 in)	65 cm (2 ft 2 in)	(Poland) BKS Bielsko-Biała
15	Agnieszka Kąkolewska	18 October 1994	197 cm (6 ft 6 in)	75 cm (2 ft 6 in)	(Poland) SMS PZPS Sosnowiec
17	Katarzyna Skowrońska	30 June 1983	189 cm (6 ft 2 in)	75 cm (2 ft 6 in)	(China) Guangdong Hengda
18	Katarzyna Wellna	22 March 1985	184 cm (6 ft 0 in)	75 cm (2 ft 6 in)	(Poland) Impel Wrocław
19	Monika Martałek	14 May 1990	187 cm (6 ft 2 in)	72 cm (2 ft 4 in)	(Poland) PTPS Piła

=== Serbia ===
- Head coach: Zoran Terzić

№	Name	Date of birth	Height	Weight	2013 club
2	Jovana Brakočević	4 March 1988	196 cm (6 ft 5 in)	82 cm (2 ft 8 in)	(Turkey) VakıfGüneş Istanbul
3	Sanja Malagurski	8 June 1990	193 cm (6 ft 4 in)	75 cm (2 ft 6 in)	(Italy) GSO Villa Cortese
4	Bojana Živković	29 March 1988	185 cm (6 ft 1 in)	70 cm (2 ft 4 in)	(Russia) Omichka Omsk
5	Nataša Krsmanović	19 June 1985	188 cm (6 ft 2 in)	73 cm (2 ft 5 in)	(Azerbaijan) Rabita Baku
6	Tijana Malešević	18 March 1991	184 cm (6 ft 0 in)	73 cm (2 ft 5 in)	(Poland) PTPS Piła
7	Brižitka Molnar	28 July 1985	182 cm (6 ft 0 in)	66 cm (2 ft 2 in)	(Turkey) Galatasaray SK
9	Brankica Mihajlović	13 April 1991	189 cm (6 ft 2 in)	64 cm (2 ft 1 in)	(France) RC Cannes
10	Maja Ognjenović	6 August 1984	183 cm (6 ft 0 in)	68 cm (2 ft 3 in)	(Poland) Impel Wrocław
11	Stefana Veljković	9 January 1990	190 cm (6 ft 3 in)	76 cm (2 ft 6 in)	(Italy) GSO Villa Cortese
12	Jelena Nikolić	13 April 1982	194 cm (6 ft 4 in)	79 cm (2 ft 7 in)	(Turkey) VakıfGüneş Istanbul
13	Ana Bjelica	9 July 1989	190 cm (6 ft 3 in)	82 cm (2 ft 8 in)	(Serbia) Crvena Zvezda
16	Milena Rašić	25 October 1990	193 cm (6 ft 4 in)	75 cm (2 ft 6 in)	(France) RC Cannes
18	Suzana Ćebić	9 November 1984	167 cm (5 ft 6 in)	60 cm (2 ft 0 in)	(Azerbaijan) Rabita Baku
19	Jasna Majstorović	23 April 1984	181 cm (5 ft 11 in)	64 cm (2 ft 1 in)	(Romania) Tomis Constanța
