= 2015–16 Azerbaijan Women's Volleyball Super League squads =

This article shows the rosters of all participating teams at the 2015–16 Azerbaijan Women's Volleyball Super League in Baku, Azerbaijan.

== Teams ==
=== Azerrail Baku ===
The following is the roster of the Azerí club Azerrail Baku in the 2015–16 Azerbaijan Women's Volleyball Super League.

Head coach: (Azerbaijan) Bülent Karslioglu

Number	Player	Position	Height (m)	Weight (kg)	Birth date
1	(Thailand) Wanna Buakaew	Libero	1.77	71	2 January 1981 (age 44)
2	(Azerbaijan) Kseniya Poznyak	Middle Blocker	1.90	86	21 November 1986 (age 38)
3	(Azerbaijan) Nikalina Bashnakova	Outside Hitter	1.87	64	29 March 1998 (age 26)
4	(Azerbaijan) Nisakhanim Hazratli	Outside Hitter	1.78	64	18 November 1997 (age 27)
5	(Azerbaijan) Odina Bayramova (c)	Outside Hitter	1.86	71	25 May 1990 (age 34)
6	(Azerbaijan) Anastasia Muzyka	Setter	1.85	68	15 October 1997 (age 27)
7	(Puerto Rico) Stephanie Enright	Outside Hitter	1.82	72	15 December 1990 (age 34)
9	(United States) Madison Kingdon	Outside Hitter	1.85	73	20 April 1993 (age 31)
10	(United States) Haley Eckerman	Opposite	1.89	75	10 November 1992 (age 32)
11	(United States) Jessica Tow-Arnett	Middle Blocker	1.86	68	15 November 1986 (age 38)
12	(Azerbaijan) Valeriya Mammadova	Libero	1.74	65	29 January 1984 (age 41)
14	(Puerto Rico) Natalia Valentín	Setter	1.72	65	12 September 1989 (age 35)
17	(Bulgaria) Strashimira Filipova	Middle Blocker	1.92	80	18 August 1985 (age 39)
18	(Thailand) Nootsara Tomkom	Setter	1.72	62	7 July 1985 (age 39)
19	(Senegal) Fatou Diouck	Opposite	1.83	70	19 June 1985 (age 39)

=== Azeryol Baku ===
The following is the roster of the Azerí club Azeryol Baku in the 2015–16 Azerbaijan Women's Volleyball Super League.

Head coach: (Azerbaijan) Aleksandr Chervyakov

Number	Player	Position	Height (m)	Weight (kg)	Birth date
2	(Germany) Mareen Apitz (c)	Setter	1.83	72	26 March 1987 (age 37)
3	(United States) Lauren Whyte	Outside Hitter	1.83	78	10 February 1991 (age 34)
4	(United States) Stephanie Niemer	Outside Hitter	1.88	70	3 September 1989 (age 35)
5	(Thailand) Malika Kanthong	Opposite	1.78	73	8 January 1987 (age 38)
6	(Canada) Kyla Richey	Outside Hitter	1.88	78	20 June 1989 (age 35)
7	(Azerbaijan) Yelena Parkhomenko	Middle Blocker	1.87	77	11 September 1982 (age 42)
8	(Azerbaijan) Anita Bredis	Setter	1.79	68	27 January 1992 (age 33)
9	(Ukraine) Anna Stepaniuk	Outside Hitter	1.80	70	31 October 1992 (age 32)
10	(Azerbaijan) Iuliia Karimova	Libero	1.75	68	7 February 1988 (age 37)
10	(Poland) Kinga Kasprzak	Outside Hitter	1.90	78	12 June 1987 (age 37)
11	(Azerbaijan) Katerina Zhidkova	Opposite	1.88	77	28 September 1989 (age 35)
12	(Azerbaijan) Shafagat Habibova	Setter	1.80	72	3 August 1991 (age 33)
14	(Hungary) Edina Dobi	Middle Blocker	1.92	80	22 October 1987 (age 37)
15	(Azerbaijan) Aynur Karimova	Middle Blocker	1.90	70	7 December 1988 (age 36)
16	(Azerbaijan) Jeyran Aliyeva	Libero	1.65	57	3 February 1995 (age 30)
17	(United States) Janelle Sykes	Middle Blocker	1.91	80	14 October 1993 (age 31)

=== Lokomotiv Baku ===
The following is the roster of the Azerí club Lokomotiv Baku in the 2015–16 Azerbaijan Women's Volleyball Super League.

Head coach: (Italy) Carlo Parisi

Number	Player	Position	Height (m)	Weight (kg)	Birth date
1	(Croatia) Hana Čutura	Outside spiker	1.86	82	10 March 1988 (age 37)
2	(Azerbaijan) Yana Azimova	Setter	1.79	70	5 July 1994 (age 30)
3	(United States) Kanani Danielson	Outside spiker	1.76	70	2 January 1990 (age 35)
4	(Czech Republic) Aneta Havlíčková	Opposite	1.87	85	3 July 1987 (age 37)
5	(Turkey) Özge Kırdar Çemberci	Setter	1.83	78	26 June 1985 (age 39)
6	(Azerbaijan) Ayshan Abdulazimova	Middle Blocker	1.85	80	11 April 1993 (age 31)
8	(Azerbaijan) Ulkar Karimova	Outside spiker	1.83	78	22 June 1994 (age 30)
9	(Serbia) Aleksandra Crnčević	Outside spiker	1.85	80	30 May 1987 (age 37)
12	(Slovakia) Jaroslava Pencová	Middle Blocker	1.87	86	24 June 1990 (age 34)
15	(Dominican Republic) Brenda Castillo	Libero	1.65	60	5 June 1992 (age 32)
16	(Azerbaijan) Oksana Kiselyova	Libero	1.78	78	30 May 1992 (age 32)
18	(Germany) Berit Kauffeldt	Middle Blocker	1.86	80	8 July 1990 (age 34)

=== Telekom Baku ===
The following is the roster of the Azerí club Telekom Baku in the 2015–16 Azerbaijan Women's Volleyball Super League.

Head coach: (Serbia) Zoran Gajic

Number	Player	Position	Height (m)	Weight (kg)	Birth date
1	(Azerbaijan) Anastasiia Baidiuk	Outside Hitter	1.89	67	5 December 1999 (age 25)
2	(Azerbaijan) Krystsina Yagubova	Setter	1.84	69	13 February 1996 (age 29)
3	(Azerbaijan) Yelyzaveta Samadova	Outside Hitter	1.85	72	3 March 1995 (age 30)
5	(Azerbaijan) Marharyta Azizova	Outside Hitter	1.86	73	25 April 1993 (age 31)
7	(Bulgaria) Gabriela Koeva	Middle Blocker	1.85	66	25 July 1989 (age 35)
8	(Bulgaria) Mariya Filipova	Libero	1.79	67	10 September 1982 (age 42)
9	(Azerbaijan) Anastasiya Bezsonova	Outside Hitter	1.87	68	21 December 1999 (age 25)
10	(Cuba) Ana Cleger	Opposite	1.85	73	27 November 1989 (age 35)
11	(Azerbaijan) Olena Hasanova	Middle Blocker	1.88	73	25 November 1995 (age 29)
12	(Montenegro) Ksenija Ivanovic	Outside Hitter	1.88	78	22 May 1986 (age 38)
14	(Azerbaijan) Bayaz Aliyeva	Libero	1.76	60	9 June 1990 (age 34)
15	(Czech Republic) Lucie Mühlsteinová	Setter	1.78	70	15 October 1984 (age 40)
17	(Bulgaria) Hristina Ruseva	Middle Blocker	1.90	77	1 October 1991 (age 33)
