= Volleyball at the 2016 Summer Olympics – Women's European qualification squads =

This article shows all participating team squads at the Volleyball at the 2016 Summer Olympics – Women's European qualification, held in Turkey from January 4 to January 9, 2016.

== Belgium ==
- Head Coach: Gert Vande Broek

#	Name	Date of birth	Weight	Height	Spike	Block	Club
2	Jasmien Biebauw	24/09/1990	1.80	81	295	274	(Belgium) Asterix Kieldrecht
3	Frauke Dirickx	03/01/1980	1.85	74	305	302	(Turkey) Bursa BBSK
4	Valerie Courtois	01/10/1990	1.71	67	280	270	(Germany) Dresdner SC
5	Laura Heyrman	17/05/1993	1.86	74	310	280	(Italy) LJ Modena
6	Charlotte Leys	18/03/1989	1.86	77	305	293	(Turkey) Galatasaray İstanbul
8	Kaja Grobelna	04/01/1995	1.88	71	318	289	(Germany) Allianz MTV Stuttgart
9	Freya Aelbrecht	10/02/1990	1.86	82	308	310	(Italy) Volley Bergamo
10	Lise Van Hecke	01/07/1992	1.85	79	299	281	(Brazil) Vôlei Nestlé Osasco
11	Els Vandesteene	30/05/1987	1.86	74	308	291	(France) Volley-Ball Nantes
14	Hélène Rousseaux	25/09/1991	1.88	65	322	300	(Italy) Igor Gorgonzola Novara
16	Celine Van Gestel	07/11/1997	1.83	70	310	280	(Belgium) Asterix Kieldrecht
17	Ilka Van de Vyver	26/01/1993	1.80	79	296	273	(Italy) Il Bisonte Firenze
18	Britt Ruysschaert	27/05/1994	1.86	74	308	291	(Belgium) Asterix Kieldrecht
22	Nathalie Lemmens	12/03/1995	1.92	85	311	288	(Belgium) Asterix Kieldrecht

== Croatia ==
- Head Coach: Miroslav Aksentijević

#	Name	Date of birth	Weight	Height	Spike	Block	Club
2	Ana Grbac	23/03/1988	1.86	82	302	288	(Romania) CS Volei Alba Blaj
3	Nikolina Božičević	14/01/1995	1.67	56	287	255	(Croatia) Mladost Zagreb
4	Nikolina Jelić	09/11/1991	1.89	80	308	294	(Poland) KS Developres Rzeszów
5	Iva Jurišić	17/05/1993	1.87	71	322	303	(Croatia) Mladost Zagreb
6	Mira Topić	02/06/1983	1.89	75	322	303	(Czech Republic) AGEL Prostějov
8	Mia Jerkov	05/12/1982	1.90	71	320	305	(Japan) Denso Airybees
10	Ivana Miloš	07/03/1986	1.88	71	322	305	(Turkey) Nilüfer Belediyespor
11	Katarina Barun-Šušnjar	01/12/1983	1.92	78	320	304	(Italy) Volley Bergamo
12	Tamara Sušić	28/11/1990	1.93	78	308	291	(Romania) CSM București
13	Samanta Fabris	08/02/1992	1.90	80	322	306	(Italy) Igor Gorgonzola Novara
14	Karla Klarić	05/09/1994	1.89	80	317	302	(France) ASPTT Mulhouse
15	Bernarda Brčić	12/05/1991	1.91	78	310	295	(Italy) Suedtirol Neruda Bolzano
18	Maja Poljak	02/05/1983	1.92	82	325	305	(Turkey) Eczacıbaşı VitrA
20	Matea Rajković	28/04/1991	1.78	65	288	261	(Croatia) Mladost Zagreb

== Germany ==
- Head Coach: Felix Koslowski

#	Name	Date of birth	Weight	Height	Spike	Block	Club
1	Lenka Dürr	10/12/1990	1.71	59	280	270	(Poland) Impel Wrocław
2	Kathleen Weiß	02/02/1984	1.71	66	290	273	(Czech Republic) AGEL Prostějov
4	Maren Brinker	10/07/1986	1.84	66	303	295	(Italy) Metalleghe Montichiari
6	Jennifer Geerties	05/04/1994	1.84	58	298	288	(Germany) Schweriner SC
9	Corina Ssuschke-Voigt	09/05/1983	1.89	75	310	298	(Germany) NawaRo Straubing
11	Christiane Fürst	29/03/1985	1.92	76	323	307	(Turkey) Eczacıbaşı VitrA
12	Heike Beier	09/12/1983	1.84	73	305	293	(Poland) Budowlani Łódź
13	Louisa Lippmann	23/09/1994	1.91	78	319	312	(Germany) Dresdner SC
14	Margareta Kozuch	30/10/1986	1.87	70	309	297	(Italy) Pomi Casalmaggiore
15	Lisa Thomsen	20/08/1985	1.72	68	290	285	(Germany) Allianz MTV Stuttgart
16	Anja Brandt	05/09/1990	1.95	77	310	295	(Germany) Schweriner SC
18	Wiebke Silge	16/07/1996	1.90	75	302	291	(Germany) SC Potsdam
20	Mareen Apitz	26/03/1987	1.83	73	295	284	(Azerbaijan) Azeryol Baku
22	Lisa Izquierdo	29/08/1994	1.78	78	309	294	(Germany) Dresdner SC

== Italy ==
- Head Coach: Marco Bonitta

#	Name	Date of birth	Weight	Height	Spike	Block	Club
4	Alessia Orro	18/07/1998	1.79	73	308	231	(Italy) Club Italia
6	Monica De Gennaro	08/01/1987	1.72	62	295	217	(Italy) Imoco Volley Conegliano
7	Martina Guiggi	01/05/1984	1.87	80	317	240	(Italy) Igor Gorgonzola Novara
8	Alessia Gennari	03/11/1991	1.83	75	305	238	(Italy) Volley Bergamo
9	Nadia Centoni	19/06/1981	1.85	70	315	238	(Turkey) Galatasaray
10	Francesca Ferretti	15/02/1984	1.80	76	298	228	(Italy) Liu Jo Modena
11	Cristina Chirichella	10/02/1994	1.95	76	320	251	(Italy) Igor Gorgonzola Novara
15	Antonella Del Core	05/11/1980	1.80	72	319	237	(Russia) Dinamo Kazan
16	Lucia Bosetti	09/07/1989	1.76	59	318	224	(Turkey) Fenerbahçe
17	Valentina Diouf	10/01/1993	2.02	94	330	261	(Italy) Liu Jo Modena
18	Paola Egonu	18/12/1998	1.89	79	336	256	(Italy) Club Italia
20	Anna Danesi	20/04/1996	1.95	77	312	246	(Italy) Club Italia
21	Sara Bonifacio	03/07/1996	1.86	75	324	244	(Italy) Igor Gorgonzola Novara
22	Stefania Sansonna	01/11/1982	1.75	72	295	220	(Italy) Igor Gorgonzola Novara

== Poland ==
- Head Coach: Jacek Nawrocki

#	Name	Date of birth	Weight	Height	Spike	Block	Club
1	Anna Werblińska	14/05/1984	1.78	65	308	295	(Poland) Chemik Police
3	Zuzanna Efimienko	08/08/1989	1.96	78	325	315	(Poland) Atom Trefl Sopot
4	Izabela Bełcik	29/11/1980	1.85	70	304	292	(Poland) Chemik Police
5	Berenika Tomsia	18/03/1988	1.89	65	318	305	(Italy) Metalleghe Montichiari
6	Anna Grejman	08/06/1993	1.83	70	307	295	(Poland) Muszynianka Muszyna
9	Gabriela Polańska	27/11/1988	1.99	83	324	315	(Poland) Budowlani Łódź
11	Sylwia Pycia	20/04/1981	1.89	79	307	300	(Poland) Budowlani Łódź
12	Aleksandra Krzos	23/06/1989	1.81	71	275	265	(Poland) Muszynianka Muszyna
13	Paulina Maj-Erwardt	22/03/1987	1.66	57	300	285	(Poland) Chemik Police
14	Joanna Wołosz	07/04/1990	1.81	71	303	295	(Poland) Chemik Police
15	Natalia Kurnikowska	13/01/1992	1.84	73	305	295	(Poland) Muszynianka Muszyna
16	Aleksandra Jagieło	20/04/1980	1.80	68	306	298	(Poland) Chemik Police
17	Katarzyna Skowrońska-Dolata	30/06/1983	1.89	75	317	306	(Poland) Impel Wrocław
18	Kamila Ganszczyk	02/12/1991	1.91	76	299	298	(Poland) MKS Dąbrowa Górnicza

== Russia ==
- Head Coach: Yuri Marichev

#	Name	Date of birth	Weight	Height	Spike	Block	Club
1	Yana Shcherban	06/09/1989	1.85	71	298	294	(Russia) Dynamo Moscow
3	Elena Ezhova	14/08/1977	1.78	69	288	282	(Russia) Dinamo Kazan
5	Lioubov Sokolova	04/12/1977	1.92	72	300	283	(Russia) Dinamo Krasnodar
7	Ekaterina Lyubushkina	02/01/1990	1.88	81	305	301	(Russia) Dynamo Moscow
8	Nataliya Obmochaeva	01/06/1989	1.96	75	315	306	(Russia) Dynamo Moscow
10	Ekaterina Kosianenko	02/02/1990	1.78	64	290	285	(Russia) Dynamo Moscow
12	Natalia Khodunova	01/07/1992	1.87	65	300	285	(Russia) Dinamo Krasnodar
13	Yevgeniya Startseva	12/02/1989	1.85	68	294	290	(Russia) Dinamo Kazan
14	Irina Fetisova	07/09/1994	1.90	76	307	286	(Russia) Dynamo Moscow
15	Tatiana Kosheleva	23/12/1988	1.91	67	315	305	(Russia) Dinamo Krasnodar
16	Irina Zaryazhko	04/10/1991	1.96	78	305	290	(Russia) Uralochka Yekaterinburg
17	Natalia Malykh	08/12/1993	1.87	65	308	297	(Russia) Dinamo Krasnodar
18	Kseniia Ilchenko	31/10/1994	1.85	64	300	286	(Russia) Uralochka Yekaterinburg
18	Anna Malova	16/04/1990	1.75	59	286	290	(Russia) Dynamo Moscow

== Netherlands ==
- Head Coach: Giovanni Guidetti

#	Name	Date of birth	Weight	Height	Spike	Block	Club
1	Kirsten Knip	14/09/1992	1.76	73	281	275	(Germany) Rote Raben Vilsbiburg
2	Femke Stoltenborg	30/07/1991	1.90	81	303	299	(Germany) Allianz MTV Stuttgart
3	Yvon Beliën	28/12/1993	1.88	73	307	303	(Italy) River Volley Piacenza
4	Celeste Plak	26/10/1995	1.90	84	314	302	(Italy) Volley Bergamo
5	Robin de Kruijf	05/05/1991	1.93	79	313	300	(Turkey) VakifBank Istanbul
6	Maret Balkestein-Grothues	16/09/1988	1.80	68	304	285	(Poland) Atom Trefl Sopot
7	Quinta Steenbergen	02/04/1985	1.89	74	309	300	(Czech Republic) AGEL Prostějov
8	Judith Pietersen	03/07/1989	1.88	73	306	296	(Italy) Pallavolo Scandicci
9	Myrthe Schoot	29/08/1988	1.84	69	298	286	(Germany) Dresdner SC
10	Lonneke Slöetjes	15/11/1990	1.92	76	322	315	(Turkey) VakifBank Istanbul
11	Anne Buijs	02/12/1991	1.91	75	317	299	(Turkey) VakifBank Istanbul
14	Laura Dijkema	18/02/1990	1.84	70	297	279	(Germany) Dresdner SC
16	Debby Stam	24/07/1984	1.84	68	303	288	(France) Rocheville Le Cannet
22	Nicole Koolhaas	31/01/1991	1.98	77	310	300	(Switzerland) VFM Franches-Montagnes

== Turkey ==
- Head Coach: Ferhat Akbaş

#	Name	Date of birth	Weight	Height	Spike	Block	Club
2	Gözde Kırdar	26/07/1985	1.83	70	307	297	(Turkey) VakifBank Istanbul
3	Gizem Karadayı	14/01/1987	1.78	60	290	285	(Turkey) Fenerbahçe Istanbul
5	Kübra Akman	13/10/1994	1.97	89	314	302	(Turkey) VakifBank Istanbul
6	Polen Uslupehlivan	27/08/1990	1.93	65	305	298	(Turkey) Fenerbahçe Istanbul
8	Bahar Toksoy Guidetti	06/02/1988	1.90	75	310	302	(Italy) Pallavolo Scandicci
9	Özge Kırdar Çemberci	26/07/1985	1.83	70	296	286	(Azerbaijan) Lokomotiv Baku
10	Güldeniz Önal	25/03/1986	1.83	75	302	293	(Turkey) Galatasaray Istanbul
11	Naz Aydemir Akyol	14/08/1990	1.86	68	300	290	(Turkey) VakifBank Istanbul
12	Gözde Yılmaz	09/09/1991	1.95	82	306	299	(Italy) Futura Volley Busto Arsizio
13	Neriman Özsoy	13/07/1988	1.88	76	309	302	(Turkey) Eczacıbaşı VitrA Istanbul
14	Eda Erdem Dündar	22/06/1987	1.88	73	299	292	(Turkey) Fenerbahçe Istanbul
15	Hatice Gizem Örge	26/04/1993	1.70	59	270	260	(Turkey) VakifBank Istanbul
17	Neslihan Demir Güler	09/12/1983	1.87	72	304	299	(Turkey) Eczacıbaşı VitrA Istanbul
19	Hande Baladın	01/09/1997	1.89	71	302	296	(Turkey) Eczacıbaşı VitrA Istanbul

== See also ==
- Volleyball at the 2016 Summer Olympics – Men's European qualification squads
