= Michaela Hasalíková =

Czech volleyball player (born 1984)

Michaela Monzoni Hasalíková

Personal information
- Nationality: Czech
- Born: 18 April 1984 (age 42)
- Height: 193 cm (76 in)

Volleyball information
- Position: central

Career
Years	Teams
2012-2013	(Azerbaijan) Lokomotiv Baku
2013-2014	(Greece) Olympiacos

National team
Czech Republic

Michaela Monzoni Hasalíková (born 18 April 1984) is a Czech female former volleyball player, playing as a central. She was part of the Czech Republic women's national volleyball team. She competed at the 2013 Women's European Volleyball Championship. On club level she played for Lokomotiv Baku and Olympiacos.
