= Elisha Thomas =

American volleyball player (born 1981)

Personal information
- Full name: Elisha Margaret Thomas
- Born: July 20, 1981 (age 45); Long Beach, California, U.S.
- Height: 6 ft 3 in (191 cm)
- Spike: 126 in (321 cm)
- Block: 118 in (299 cm)
- Education: Long Beach State University

Volleyball information
- Position: Middle Blocker
- Number: 10 (National)

National team
United States

Elisha Margaret Thomas (born July 20, 1981) is a volleyball player from the United States, who played as a middle-blocker.

She represented United States women's national volleyball team at the 2003 FIVB World Grand Prix.

== Clubs ==
1999–2002	Long Beach State University
2004–2005	Hisamitsu Springs
2005–2006	Arzano F
2007–2008	Dinamo-Metar
2008–2009	Prostějov
2009–2010	Azerrail
2011–2012	Lokomotiv Baku
