= CSU Galați =

CSU Galați may refer to:

- CSU Galați (volleyball), a women's volleyball club
- CSU Dunărea de Jos Galați, a men's football club
