= Volleyball at the 2016 Summer Olympics – Men's European qualification squads =

This article shows all participating team squads at the European Qualification Tournament for the 2016 Men's Olympic Volleyball Tournament, held in Germany from 4 to 9 January 2016.

== Belgium ==
№	Name	Date of birth	Position	Club
Coach	Dominique Baeyens	21 February 1956		
1	Bram Van den Dries	14 August 1989	Outside-spiker	AZS UWM Olsztyn
3	Sam Deroo	24 April 1992	Opposite	ZAKSA Kędzierzyn
4	Pieter Coolman	24 April 1989	Middle-blocker	VT Roeselare
8	Kévin Klinkenberg	4 October 1990	Opposite	Łucz. Bydgoszcz
9	Pieter Verhees	8 December 1989	Middle-blocker	Volley Milano
10	Simon Van de Voorde	19 December 1989	Middle-blocker	Trentino Volley
12	Gert Van Walle	7 August 1987	Opposite	Beauvais Oise UC
13	Dennis Deroey	14 August 1987	Libero	Topvolley Antwerpen
14	Jelle Ribbens	17 March 1992	Libero	
15	Stijn D'Hulst	24 April 1991	Setter	VT Roeselare
16	Matthias Valkiers	8 April 1990	Setter	Volley Club Menen
17	Tomas Rousseaux	31 March 1994	Outside-spiker	Volley Milano
18	Seppe Baetens	13 February 1989	Opposite	VC Asse-Lennik
20	Arno van de Velde	30 December 1995	Middle-blocker	VT Roeselare

== Bulgaria ==
№	Name	Date of birth	Position	Club
coach	Plamen Konstantinov	16 June 1973		
1	Georgi Bratoev	21 October 1987	Setter	Trentino Volley
2	Metodi Ananiev	17 February 1986	Opposite	Tomis Costanza
4	Martin Bozhilov	11 April 1988	Libero	MUI Dupnica
7	Miroslav Gradinarov	10 February 1985	Opposite	
8	Todor Skrimov	9 January 1990	Opposite	Power Volley Milano
10	Nikolaj Učikov	13 April 1986	Outside-spiker	
11	Vladimir Nikolov	3 October 1977	Outside-spiker	ASUL Lione
12	Viktor Josifov	16 May 1985	Middle-blocker	Top Latina
13	Teodor Salparov	16 August 1982	Libero	Zenit-Kazan'
14	Teodor Todorov	1 September 1989	Middle-blocker	PV Lugano
16	Vladislav Ivanov	14 March 1987	Libero	ASUL Lione
17	Nikolaj Penčev	22 May 1992	Opposite	Resovia Rzeszów
18	Nikolaj Nikolov	29 July 1986	Middle-blocker	Payakan VC
20	Lubomir Agontsev	26 July 1987	Setter	Montana Volley

== Finland ==
№	Name	Date of birth	Position	Club
coach	Tuomas Sammelvuo	16 February 1976		
1	Ville Juntura	26 March 1988	Setter	Raisio Loimu
2	Eemi Tervaportti	26 July 1989	Setter	Galatasaray SK
4	Lauri Kerminen	18 January 1993	Libero	VK Kuzbass
5	Antti Siltala	14 March 1984	Opposite	
6	Niklas Seppänen	30 June 1993	Opposite	
7	Eemeli Kouki	26 October 1991	Opposite	Hurrikaani Loimaa
8	Elviss Krastins	15 September 1994	Opposite	Vammala Lentopallo
9	Tommi Siirilä	15 March 1988	Middle-blocker	Tiikerit Kokkola
11	Sauli Sinkkonen	14 September 1989	Outside-spiker	Isku Tamperee
13	Antti Ropponen	17 August 1995	Outside-spiker	Tiikerit Kokkola
14	Konstantin Shumov	15 February 1985	Middle-blocker	Hurrikaani Loimaa
16	Olli-Pekka Ojansivu	31 December 1987	Outside-spiker	Tiikerit Kokkola
18	Jukka Lehtonen	22 February 1982	Middle-blocker	LEKA Kuopio
19	Pasi Hyvärinen	22 November 1987	Libero	

== France ==
№	Name	Date of birth	Position	Club
coach	Laurent Tillie	1 December 1963		
1	Jonas Aguenier	28 April 1992	Middle-blocker	(France) AS Cannes
2	Jenia Grebennikov	13 August 1990	Libero	(Italy) Lube Treia
4	Antonin Rouzier	18 August 1986	Outside-spiker	(Turkey) Arkas Izmir
6	Benjamin Toniutti	30 October 1989	Setter	(Poland) ZAKSA Kędzierzyn
7	Kévin Tillie	2 November 1990	Opposite	(Poland) ZAKSA Kędzierzyn
9	Earvin N'Gapeth	21 February 1991	Opposite	(Italy) Modena Volley
10	Kévin Le Roux	11 May 1989	Middle-blocker	(Turkey) Halkbank Ankara
11	Julien Lyneel	15 April 1990	Opposite	(Poland) Resovia Rzeszów
13	Pierre Pujol	13 July 1984	Setter	(France) AS Cannes
14	Nicolas Le Goff	15 February 1992	Middle-blocker	(Germany) SCC Berlino
16	Nicolas Maréchal	4 March 1987	Opposite	(Poland) Jastrzębski Węgiel
17	Franck Lafitte	8 March 1989	Middle-blocker	(France) Arago de Sète
18	Nicolas Rossard	23 May 1990	Libero	(France) Arago de Sète
21	Mory Sidibé	17 June 1987	Outside-spiker	(China) Sichuan Volleyball

== Germany ==
№	Name	Date of birth	Position	Club
coach	Vital Heynen	12 June 1969		
1	Christian Fromm	15 August 1990	Opposite	Sir Safety Perugia
2	Markus Steuerwald	7 March 1989	Libero	Parigi Volley
3	Sebastian Schwarz	2 October 1985	Opposite	Trefl Danzica
6	Denis Kaliberda	24 June 1990	Opposite	Sir Safety Perugia
8	Marcus Böhme	25 August 1985	Middle-blocker	Cuprum Lubin
9	Georg Grozer	27 November 1984	Outside-spiker	Samsung Bluefangs
10	Christian Dünnes	16 June 1984	Opposite	TG Rüsselsheim
11	Lukas Kampa	29 November 1986	Setter	WKS Czarni Radom
12	Ferdinand Tille	8 December 1988	Libero	TuS Herrsching
13	Simon Hirsch	3 April 1992	Outside-spiker	Top Latina
14	Tom Strohbach	27 May 1992	Opposite	TV Rottenburg
15	Tim Broshog	2 December 1987	Middle-blocker	Noliko Maaseik
16	Patrick Steuerwald	3 March 1986	Setter	TuS Herrsching
20	Philipp Collin	28 March 1990	Middle-blocker	Tours Volley-Ball

== Poland ==
№	Name	Date of birth	Position	Club
coach	Stéphane Antiga	3 February 1976		
1	Wojciech Żaliński	8 January 1988	Opposite	WKS Czarni Radom
3	Dawid Konarski	31 August 1989	Opposite	ZAKSA Kędzierzyn
6	Bartosz Kurek	29 August 1988	Opposite	Resovia Rzeszów
7	Karol Kłos	8 August 1989	Middle-blocker	Skra Bełchatów
8	Andrzej Wrona	27 December 1988	Middle-blocker	Skra Bełchatów
9	Mateusz Bieniek	5 April 1994	Middle-blocker	Effector Kielce
10	Damian Wojtaszek	7 September 1988	Libero	Resovia Rzeszów
11	Fabian Drzyzga	3 January 1990	Setter	Resovia Rzeszów
12	Grzegorz Łomacz	1 October 1987	Setter	Cuprum Lubin
13	Michał Kubiak	23 February 1988	Opposite	Halkbank Ankara
17	Paweł Zatorski	21 June 1990	Libero	ZAKSA Kędzierzyn
18	Marcin Możdżonek	9 February 1985	Middle-blocker	Cuprum Lubin
20	Mateusz Mika	21 January 1991	Opposite	Trefl Danzica
21	Rafał Buszek	28 April 1987	Opposite	ZAKSA Kędzierzyn

== Russia ==
№	Name	Date of birth	Position	Club
coach	Vladimir Alekno	4 December 1966	-	Zenit-Kazan'
1	Aleksey Obmochaev	22 May 1989	Libero	Dinamo Mosca
3	Dmitry Kovalyov	15 March 1991	Setter	VK Ural Ufa
4	Artem Volvich	22 January 1990	Middle-blocker	Loko Novosibirsk
5	Sergey Grankin	21 January 1985	Setter	Dinamo Mosca
8	Sergey Tetyukhin	23 September 1975	Opposite	VK Belogor'e
9	Yury Berezhko	27 January 1984	Opposite	Dinamo Mosca
11	Andrey Ashchev	10 May 1983	Middle-blocker	Zenit-Kazan'
12	Konstantin Bakun	15 March 1985	Outside-spiker	Gazprom Surgut
15	Dmitry Shcherbinin	10 September 1989	Middle-blocker	Dinamo Mosca
16	Aleksey Verbov	31 January 1982	Libero	Zenit-Kazan'
17	Maxim Mikhaylov	19 March 1988	Outside-spiker	Zenit-Kazan'
18	Aleksandr Volkov	14 February 1985	Middle-blocker	VK Ural Ufa
19	Egor Kliuka	15 June 1995	Opposite	Fakel Novyj Urengoj
22	Aleksandr Markin	28 July 1990	Opposite	Dinamo Mosca

== Serbia ==
№	Name	Date of birth	Position	Club
coach	Nikola Grbić	6 September 1973		
2	Nikola Kovačević	14 February 1983	Opposite	Loko Novosibirsk
3	Milan Katić	22 October 1993	Opposite	Galatasaray SK
4	Nemanja Petrić	28 July 1987	Opposite	Modena Volley
7	Dragan Stanković	18 October 1985	Middle-blocker	Lube Treia
8	Marko Ivović	22 December 1990	Opposite	VK Belogor'e
9	Nikola Jovović	13 February 1992	Setter	Volley Milano
13	Dražen Luburić	2 November 1993	Outside-spiker	Pallavolo Piacenza
14	Aleksandar Atanasijević	4 September 1991	Outside-spiker	Sir Safety Perugia
16	Aleksa Brđović	29 July 1993	Setter	Gazprom Surgut
17	Neven Majstorović	17 March 1989	Opposite	WKS Czarni Radom
18	Marko Podraščanin	29 August 1987	Middle-blocker	Lube Treia
19	Nikola Rosić	5 August 1984	Libero	PV Lugano
20	Srećko Lisinac	17 May 1992	Middle-blocker	Skra Bełchatów
22	Aleksandar Okolić	26 June 1993	Middle-blocker	Stella Rossa

== See also ==
- Volleyball at the 2016 Summer Olympics – Women's European qualification squads
