= Ulkar Karimova =

Azerbaijani volleyball player

Personal information
- Nationality: Azerbaijani
- Born: 22 June 1994 (age 32) Baku, Azerbaijan
- Height: 1.78 m (5 ft 10 in)
- Weight: 73 kg (161 lb)
- Spike: 275 cm (108 in)
- Block: 264 cm (104 in)

Volleyball information
- Position: Outside hitter
- Current team: (Azerbaijan) Turan VC
- Number: 8

National team
- Years: Team
- 2011–: Azerbaijan

Ulkar Karimova (born 22 June 1994) is an Azerbaijani volleyball player that plays as an outside hitter for Turan VC and Azerbaijan women's national volleyball team.

== Career ==
Ulkar Karimova began her professional career at Nagliyatchi VC and spent her entire career playing for clubs in Azerbaijan. She represents Turan VC since 2025.

== Clubs ==
- (Azerbaijan) Nagliyatchi VC (2009–2010)
- (Azerbaijan) Azerrail Baku (2010–2011)
- (Azerbaijan) Azeryol Baku (2011–2012)
- (Azerbaijan) Shirvan VC (2012–2013)
- (Azerbaijan) Azerrail Baku (2013–2014)
- (Azerbaijan) Azeryol Baku (2014–2015)
- (Azerbaijan) Lokomotiv Baku (2015–2016)
- (Azerbaijan) Telekom Baku (2016–2017)
- (Azerbaijan) Murov VC (2019–2020)
- (Azerbaijan) UNEC VC (2021–2022)
- (Azerbaijan) Azerrail Baku (2022–2023)
- (Azerbaijan) Absheron VC (2023–2024)
- (Azerbaijan) DH Volley (2024–2025)
- (Azerbaijan) Turan VC (2025–present)
