= Astrid Souply =

French volleyball player (born 1993)

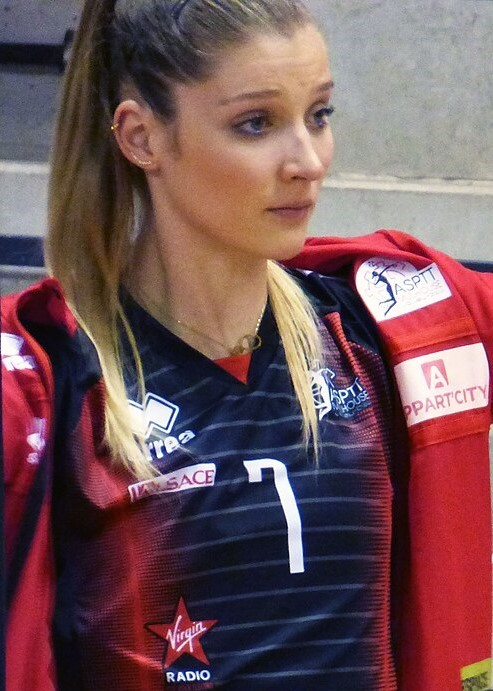

Personal information
- Nationality: French
- Born: 21 July 1993 (age 33); Reims, France
- Height: 191 cm (6 ft 3 in)
- Weight: 80 kg (176 lb)

Volleyball information
- Position: right side hitter
- Number: 2 (national team)

Career
Years	Teams
2013	Amiens Volley

National team
2013	France

Astrid Souply (born 21 July 1993) is a French female former volleyball player, playing as a right side hitter. She was part of the France women's national volleyball team.

She competed at the 2013 Women's European Volleyball Championship. On club level she played for Amiens Volley.
