= Milena Radecka =

Polish volleyball player (born 1984)

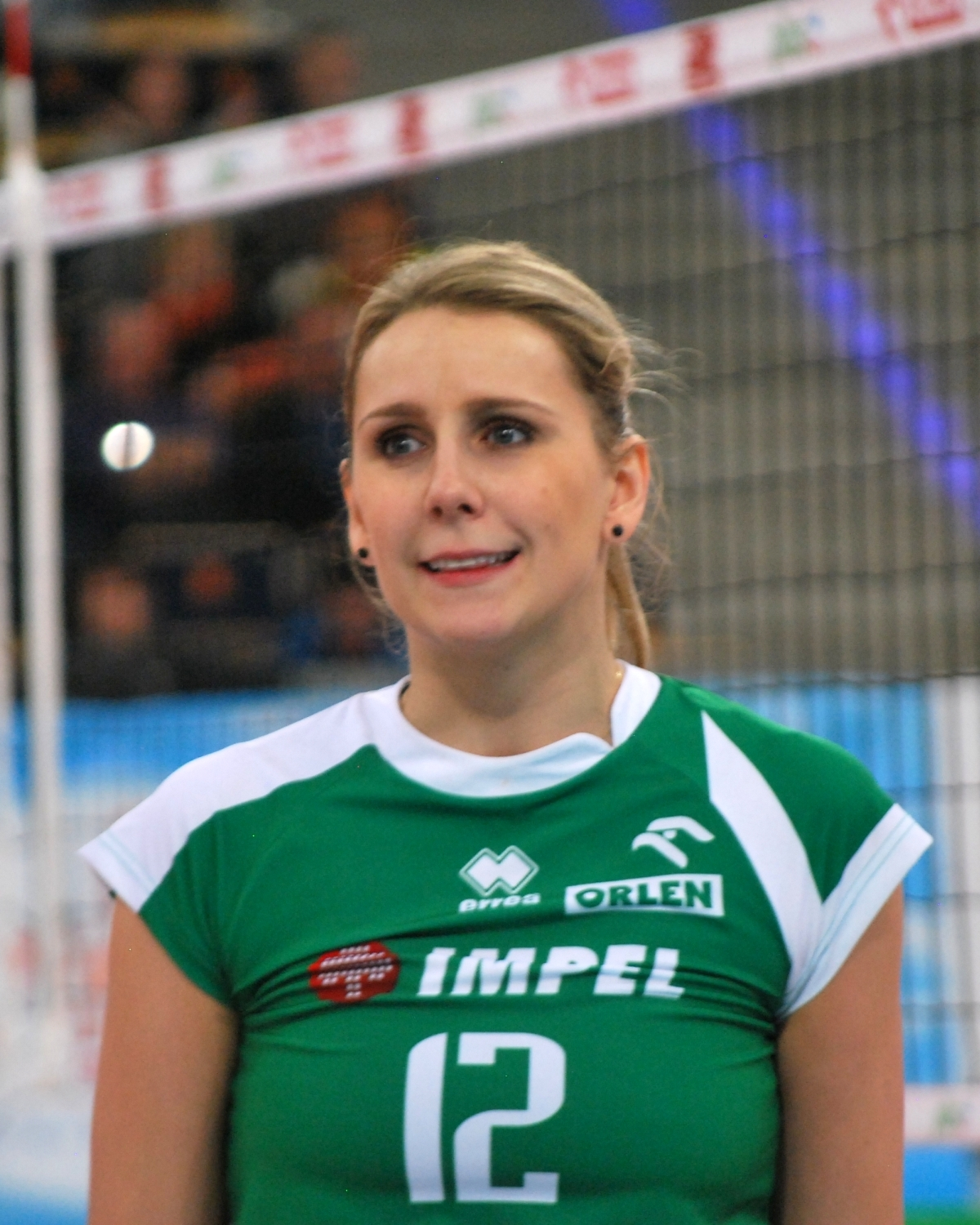

Personal information
- Full name: Milena Maria Radecka (nee Sadurek-Mikołajczyk, nee Sadurek)
- Nationality: Polish
- Born: 18 October 1984 (age 42); Katowice, Poland
- Height: 1.78 m (5 ft 10 in)
- Weight: 67 kg (148 lb)
- Spike: 302 cm (119 in)
- Block: 295 cm (116 in)

Volleyball information
- Position: Setter
- Current team: Impel Wrocław
- Number: 12

Career
Years	Teams
1999–2003; 2003–2008; 2008–2009; 2009–2010; 2010–2012; 2012–2013; 2013–2014; 2014–2015; 2015–	Kolejarz Katowice; SMS PZPS Sosnowiec; BKS Stal Bielsko-Biała; PTPS Farmutil Piła; CSU Metal Galați; Muszynianka Muszyna; Azerrail Baku; Lokomotiv Baku; Foppapedretti Bergamo; Impel Wrocław

National team
2007–2013	Poland
Honours
Representing Poland
Women's volleyball
European Championship
Bronze medal – third place	2009 Poland
- Last updated: 7 February 2017

Milena Maria Radecka (née Sadurek-Mikołajczyk, née Sadurek) (born 18 October 1984) is a Polish volleyball player, a member of Poland women's national volleyball team and Polish club Impel Wrocław, a participant of the Olympic Games Beijing 2008, bronze medalist of European Championship 2009), Polish Champion (2004, 2011).

== Personal life ==
She was born in Katowice, Poland. On 31 December 2007 she married Marcin Mikołajczyk. They got divorced in 2009. On 3 June 2011 she married Jakub Radecki. She has since reverted to her maiden name of Sadurek.

== Career ==
In June 2015 she signed a contract with Polish team Impel Wrocław. She left Impel Wroclaw in May 2016 and now working as a commentator for Canal+Sport and is an ambassador for Klubów Sportowych Orange.

== Sporting achievements ==
=== Clubs ===
==== National championships ====
- 2003/2004 Polish Cup, with BKS Stal Bielsko-Biała
- 2003/2004 Polish Championship, with BKS Stal Bielsko-Biała
- 2005/2006 Polish Cup, with BKS Stal Bielsko-Biała
- 2006/2007 Polish SuperCup 2006, with BKS Stal Bielsko-Biała
- 2006/2007 Polish Championship, with BKS Stal Bielsko-Biała
- 2008/2009 Polish SuperCup 2008, with PTPS Farmutil Piła
- 2008/2009 Polish Championship, with PTPS Farmutil Piła
- 2010/2011 Polish Cup, with Bank BPS Muszynianka Fakro Muszyna
- 2010/2011 Polish Championship, with Bank BPS Muszynianka Fakro Muszyna
- 2011/2012 Polish SuperCup 2011, with Bank BPS Muszynianka Fakro Muszyna
- 2011/2012 Polish Championship, with Bank BPS Muszynianka Fakro Muszyna
- 2012/2013 Azeri Championship, with Azerrail Baku

=== National team ===
- 2001 CEV U18 European Championship
- 2001 FIVB U18 World Championship
- 2002 CEV U20 European Championship
- 2003 FIVB U20 World Championship
- 2009 CEV European Championship
