= Nina Coolman =

Belgian volleyball player

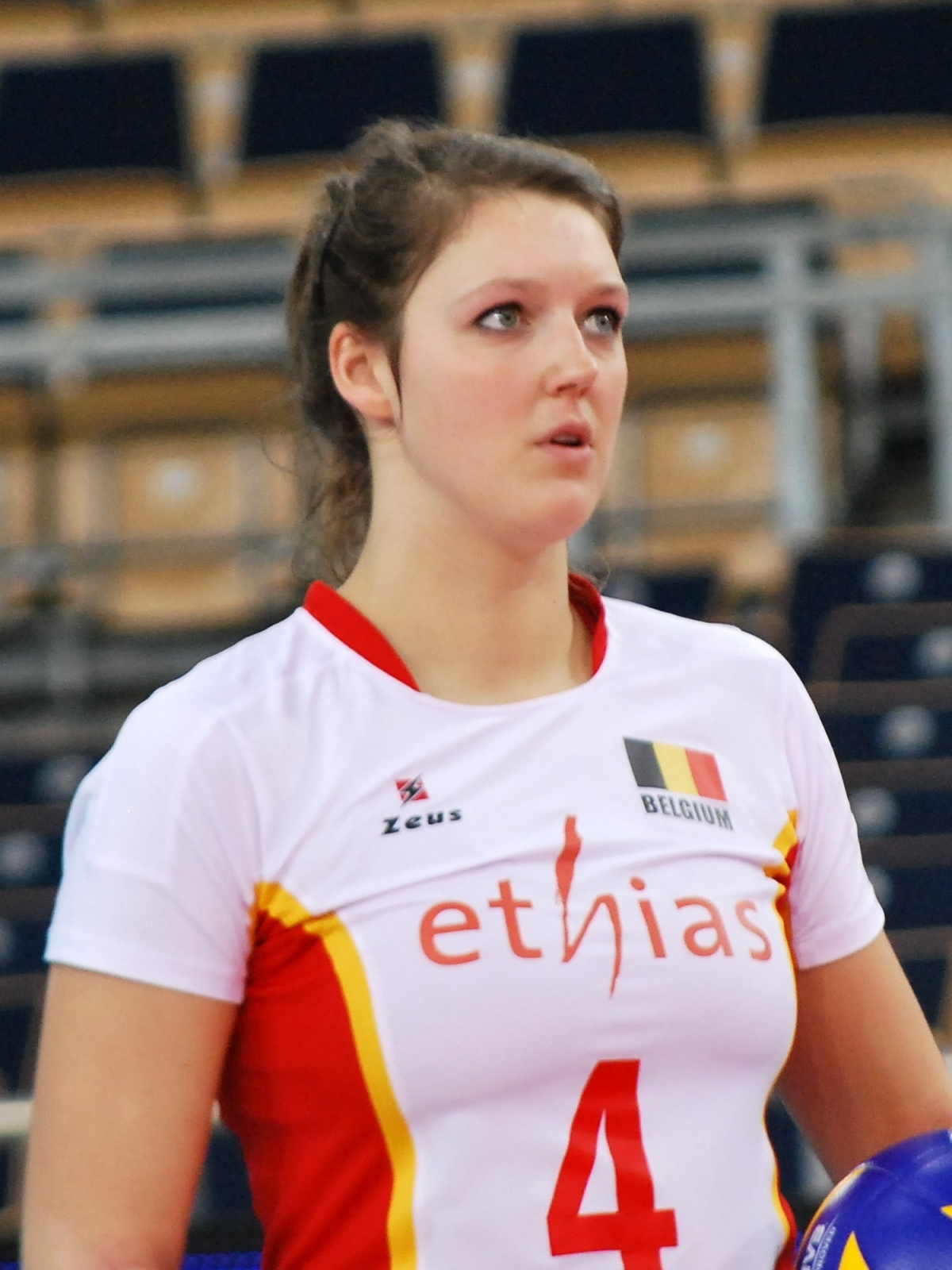

Personal information
- Nationality: Belgium
- Born: 25 January 1991 (age 35)
- Height: 1.80 m (5 ft 11 in)
- Weight: 70 kg (154 lb)
- Spike: 305 cm (120 in)
- Block: 293 cm (115 in)

Volleyball information
- Number: 4

Career
Years	Teams
2014	(France) Saint-Cloud Paris
Honours
Women's volleyball
Representing Belgium
European Championships
Bronze medal – third place	2013 Germany	Team

Nina Coolman (Dutch pronunciation: [ˈninaː ˈkoːlmɑn]; born 25 January 1991) is a Belgian female volleyball player. She is a member of the Belgium women's national volleyball team and played for Saint-Cloud Paris in 2014.

She was part of the Belgian national team at the 2014 FIVB Volleyball Women's World Championship in Italy.

== Clubs ==
- (France) Saint-Cloud Paris (2014)
