= Lokomotiv Baku =

Azerbaijani women's volleyball club

Lokomotiv VC
- Full name: Lokomotiv Bakı
- Founded: 2008
- Manager: (Azerbaijan) Aleksandr Chervyakov
- League: Azerbaijan Superleague

Uniforms
Home	Away

Lokomotiv Baku is an Azerbaijani women's volleyball club.

== Team ==
Season 2015–2016 As of December 2015.

Number	Player	Position	Height (m)	Weight (kg)	Birth date
1	(Croatia) Hana Čutura	Outside spiker	1.86	82	10 March 1988 (age 37)
2	(Azerbaijan) Yana Azimova	Setter	1.79	70	5 July 1994 (age 31)
3	(United States) Kanani Danielson	Outside spiker	1.76	70	2 January 1990 (age 36)
4	(Czech Republic) Aneta Havlíčková	Opposite	1.87	85	3 July 1987 (age 38)
5	(Turkey) Özge Kırdar Çemberci	Setter	1.83	78	26 June 1985 (age 40)
6	(Azerbaijan) Ayshan Abdulazimova	Middle Blocker	1.85	80	11 April 1993 (age 32)
8	(Azerbaijan) Ulkar Karimova	Outside spiker	1.83	78	22 June 1994 (age 31)
9	(Serbia) Aleksandra Crnčević	Outside spiker	1.85	80	30 May 1987 (age 38)
10	(United States) Sonja Newcombe	Outside spiker	1.88	76	7 March 1988 (age 37)
12	(Slovakia) Jaroslava Pencová	Middle Blocker	1.87	86	24 June 1990 (age 35)
15	(Dominican Republic) Brenda Castillo	Libero	1.65	60	5 June 1992 (age 33)
16	(Azerbaijan) Oksana Kiselyova	Libero	1.78	78	30 May 1992 (age 33)
18	(Germany) Berit Kauffeldt	Middle Blocker	1.86	80	8 July 1990 (age 35)

2014–2015 Team
Number	Player	Position	Height (m)	Weight (kg)	Birth date
1	(Germany) Lisa Thomsen	Libero	1.65	60	20 August 1985 (age 40)
3	(United States) Carli Lloyd	Setter	1.79	73	6 August 1989 (age 36)
4	(Czech Republic) Aneta Havlíčková	Opposite	1.87	85	3 July 1987 (age 38)
5	(Czech Republic) Šárka Kubínová	Setter	1.79	70	19 April 1988 (age 37)
5	(Turkey) Tuğçe Atıcı	Setter	1.81	72	27 March 1989 (age 36)
6	(Azerbaijan) Ayshan Abdulazimova	Middle Blocker	1.85	80	11 April 1993 (age 32)
7	(Netherlands) Quinta Steenbergen	Middle Blocker	1.89	78	2 April 1985 (age 40)
8	(Azerbaijan) Ulkar Karimova	Libero	1.83	78	22 June 1994 (age 31)
9	(Serbia) Aleksandra Crnčević	Outside spiker	1.85	80	30 May 1987 (age 38)
10	(Serbia) Ivana Đerisilo	Opposite	1.88	68	8 August 1983 (age 42)
11	(Netherlands) Anne Buijs	Outside spiker	1.91	80	2 December 1991 (age 34)
12	(Greece) Eva Chantava	Outside spiker	1.85	75	26 October 1990 (age 35)
13	(Italy) Valentina Arrighetti	Middle Blocker	1.85	79	26 January 1985 (age 41)
16	(Azerbaijan) Oksana Kiselyova	Libero	1.77	74	30 May 1992 (age 33)
17	(Italy) Valeria Rosso	Outside spiker	1.86	79	24 October 1981 (age 44)

2013–2014 Team
Number	Player	Position	Height (m)	Weight (kg)	Birth date
1	(Turkey) Gizem Giraygil	Setter	1.84	78	8 May 1986 (age 39)
2	(United States) Whitney Dosty	Outside spiker	1.92	80	25 February 1988 (age 37)
2	(United States) Arielle Wilson	Middle Blocker	1.91	72	3 January 1989 (age 37)
3	(Bulgaria) Mariya Filipova	Libero	1.75	70	10 September 1982 (age 43)
4	(South Korea) Kim Sa-Nee	Setter	1.75	70	21 June 1981 (age 44)
5	(Belarus) Vera Klimovich	Middle Blocker	1.85	70	29 April 1988 (age 37)
6	(Czech Republic) Tereza Rossi	Opposite	1.91	82	3 December 1982 (age 43)
7	(Lithuania) Valdonė Petrauskaitė (c)	Outside-spiker	1.82	75	23 August 1984 (age 41)
8	(United States) Alexis Crimes	Middle Blocker	1.86	71	12 June 1986 (age 39)
9	(United States) Lauren Gibbemeyer	Middle Blocker	1.87	71	8 September 1989 (age 36)
10	(Poland) Milena Radecka	Setter	1.78	67	18 October 1984 (age 41)
11	(United States) Cassidy Lichtman	Outside spiker	1.85	68	25 May 1989 (age 36)
13	(Croatia) Katarina Barun	Opposite	1.95	80	1 December 1983 (age 42)
14	(Dominican Republic) Prisilla Rivera	Outside spiker	1.87	79	29 December 1984 (age 41)
16	(Russia) Aleksandra Samoylova	Outside spiker	1.85	76	14 May 1987 (age 38)
17	(Croatia) Ana Grbac	Setter	1.86	80	23 March 1988 (age 37)
18	(Serbia) Suzana Ćebić	Libero	1.67	60	9 November 1984 (age 41)

2012–2013 Team
Number	Player	Position	Height (m)	Weight (kg)	Birth date
1	(Bulgaria) Diana Nenova	Setter	1.82	72	16 April 1985 (age 40)
2	(Belarus) Volha Palcheuskaya	Setter	1.85	78	6 December 1984 (age 41)
3	(Bulgaria) Mariya Filipova	Libero	1.78	72	10 September 1982 (age 43)
4	(Czech Republic) Aneta Havlickova (c)	Opposite	1.88	88	3 July 1987 (age 38)
5	(Belarus) Vera Klimovich	Middle Blocker	1.85	70	29 April 1988 (age 37)
6	(Azerbaijan) Ayshan Abdulazimova	Middle Blocker	1.85	70	11 April 1993 (age 32)
7	(United States) Tamari Miyashiro	Libero	1.67	76	8 July 1987 (age 38)
8	(Netherlands) Maret Grothues	Outside spiker	1.80	67	16 September 1988 (age 37)
9	(Germany) Corina Ssuschke-Voigt	Middle Blocker	1.88	82	9 May 1983 (age 42)
10	(Ukraine) Tatiana Artmenko	Outside spiker	1.87	79	2 September 1976 (age 49)
11	(Brazil) Mari Mendes	Outside spiker	1.80	75	13 January 1984 (age 42)
12	(Czech Republic) Michaela Monzoni	Middle Blocker	1.90	78	18 April 1984 (age 41)
14	(Poland) Magdalena Saad	Libero	1.56	58	14 May 1985 (age 40)
15	(United States) Mary Spicer	Setter	1.77	67	3 July 1987 (age 38)
16	(Russia) Aleksandra Samoylova	Outside spiker	1.85	76	14 May 1987 (age 38)
17	(Brazil) Juliana Costa	Outside spiker	1.85	80	9 May 1982 (age 43)
18	(Russia) Iuliia Tsvetkova	Opposite	1.98	85	5 July 1985 (age 40)

2011–2012 Team
Number	Player	Position	Height (m)	Weight (kg)	Birth date
1	(Bulgaria) Diana Nenova	Setter	1.82	72	16 April 1985 (age 40)
2	(Belarus) Volha Palcheuskaya	Setter	1.85	78	6 December 1984 (age 41)
3	(Bulgaria) Mariya Filipova	Libero	1.78	72	10 September 1982 (age 43)
4	(Argentina) Lucía Gaido	Libero	1.62	53	19 January 1988 (age 38)
5	(Belarus) Vera Klimovich	Middle Blocker	1.85	70	29 April 1988 (age 37)
7	(Azerbaijan) Yelena Parkhomenko	Middle Blocker	1.85	82	11 September 1982 (age 43)
8	(Venezuela) Verónica Gómez	Outside spiker	1.85	79	30 August 1985 (age 40)
10	(Bulgaria) Kremena Kamenova	Outside spiker	1.85	68	21 May 1988 (age 37)
12	(United States) Nancy Metcalf	Opposite	1.85	89	12 November 1978 (age 47)
13	(United States) Elisha Thomas	Middle Blocker	1.91	80	20 July 1981 (age 44)
14	(Croatia) Ivana Miloš	Middle Blocker	1.87	71	7 March 1986 (age 39)
15	(Israel) Anna Farhi	Middle Blocker	1.87	72	1 March 1980 (age 45)
16	(Russia) Aleksandra Samoylova	Outside spiker	1.85	76	14 May 1987 (age 38)
17	(Cuba) Marta Sánchez	Outside spiker	1.85	82	17 May 1973 (age 52)

2010–2011 Team
Number	Player	Position	Height (m)	Weight (kg)	Birth date
1	(Bulgaria) Kremena Kamenova	Outside spiker	1.85	68	21 May 1988 (age 37)
2	(Azerbaijan) Kseniya Poznyak	Middle Blocker	1.90	86	21 November 1986 (age 39)
3	(Bulgaria) Mariya Filipova	Libero	1.78	72	10 September 1982 (age 43)
4	(United States) Julie Rubenstein	Outside spiker	1.88	75	9 April 1987 (age 38)
5	(Belarus) Vera Klimovich	Middle Blocker	1.85	70	29 April 1988 (age 37)
6	(United States) Nicole Davis	Libero	1.67	73	24 April 1982 (age 43)
7	(Azerbaijan) Yelena Parkhomenko	Middle Blocker	1.85	82	11 September 1982 (age 43)
9	(United States) Kristin Hildebrand	Outside spiker	1.85	68	30 June 1985 (age 40)
10	(Azerbaijan) Oksana Mammadyarova	Opposite	1.77	65	6 April 1978 (age 47)
11	(Slovakia) Monika Smak	Setter	1.73	68	29 August 1973 (age 52)
12	(United States) Nancy Metcalf	Opposite	1.85	89	12 November 1978 (age 47)
14	(Peru) Elena Keldibekova	Setter	1.77	72	23 June 1974 (age 51)
15	(Azerbaijan) Ayshan Abdulazimova	Middle Blocker	1.85	80	11 April 1993 (age 32)
16	(Russia) Aleksandra Samoylova	Outside spiker	1.85	76	14 May 1987 (age 38)
17	(Israel) Inessa Birman-Vysotski	Middle-blocker	1.88	71	21 August 1978 (age 47)

2009–2010 Team
Number	Player	Position	Height (m)	Weight (kg)	Birth date
1	(Ukraine) Svitlana Obolonska	Libero	1.85	73	5 April 1978 (age 47)
2	(Azerbaijan) Kseniya Poznyak	Middle Blocker	1.90	86	21 November 1986 (age 39)
3	(Bulgaria) Tanya Sabkova	Outside spiker	1.87	66	10 June 1988 (age 37)
4	(Azerbaijan) Inara Khalilova	Outside spiker	1.84	73	5 April 1993 (age 32)
5	(Belarus) Vera Klimovich	Middle Blocker	1.85	70	29 April 1988 (age 37)
6	(Bulgaria) Tsvetelina Zarkova	Middle Blocker	1.87	69	18 December 1986 (age 39)
7	(Azerbaijan) Yelena Parkhomenko	Middle Blocker	1.85	82	11 September 1982 (age 43)
8	(Azerbaijan) Anita Bredis	Setter	1.79	68	27 January 1992 (age 34)
9	(Bulgaria) Lyubka Debarlieva	Setter	1.78	69	21 September 1980 (age 45)
10	(Azerbaijan) Oksana Mammadyarova	Opposite	1.77	65	6 April 1978 (age 47)
11	(Azerbaijan) Aytadj Zeynalova	Opposite	1.88	71	24 May 1993 (age 32)
12	(Azerbaijan) Shafagat Habibova	Setter	1.78	63	3 August 1991 (age 34)
13	(Bulgaria) Kremena Kamenova	Outside spiker	1.85	68	21 May 1988 (age 37)
14	(Azerbaijan) Lala Baghiyeva	Libero	1.65	57	13 January 1986 (age 40)
15	(Azerbaijan) Ayshan Abdulazimova	Middle Blocker	1.85	80	11 April 1993 (age 32)

== Honours ==
- Challenge Cup
  - Winner: 2011/2012
  - Runners-up: 2010/2011
- Azerbaijan Superleague:
  - Runners-up (4): 2002-03, 2009–10, 2011–12, 2014-15
  - Third (4): 2003-04, 2004–05, 2007–08, 2008-09
