= Yana Doroshenko =

Ukrainian-born Azerbaijani volleyball player

Personal information
- Full name: Yana Aleksandrovna Doroshenko
- Nationality: Ukraine; Azerbaijan
- Born: 5 July 1994 (age 32) Chernihiv, Ukraine
- Height: 1.76 m (5 ft 9 in)
- Weight: 65 kg (143 lb)
- Spike: 290 cm (110 in)
- Block: 285 cm (112 in)

Volleyball information
- Position: Setter
- Current club: Maccabi Hadera Hefer
- Number: 9

Career
- Years: Team
- 2013–2015 2015–2016 2016–2017 2017–2018 2018–2019 2019-2020 2020-present: (Azerbaijan) Rabita Baku (Azerbaijan) Lokomotiv Baku (Azerbaijan) Telekom Baku (Azerbaijan) Absheron VC (Azerbaijan) Azerrail Baku (Azerbaijan) Mübariz SK (Israel) Maccabi Hadera Hefer

National team
- Years: Team
- 2018-present: Azerbaijan

Yana Doroshenko (Ukrainian: Яна Дорошенко; born Yana Azimova, 5 July 1994) is a Ukrainian-born Azerbaijani volleyball player that plays for Maccabi Hadera Hefer in Israeli Women's Volleyball League and Azerbaijan women's national volleyball team.

She competed at the 2018 Women's World Volleyball Championship, and 2021 Women's European Volleyball Championship.

== Clubs ==
- (Azerbaijan) Rabita Baku (2013-2015)
- (Azerbaijan) Lokomotiv Baku (2015-2016)
- (Azerbaijan) Telekom Baku (2016-2017)
- (Azerbaijan) Absheron (2017-2018)
- (Azerbaijan) Azerrail Baku (2018-2019)
- (Azerbaijan) Mübariz SK (2019-2020)
- (Israel) Maccabi Hadera (2020-2022)
