= Berit Kauffeldt =

German volleyball player (born 1990)

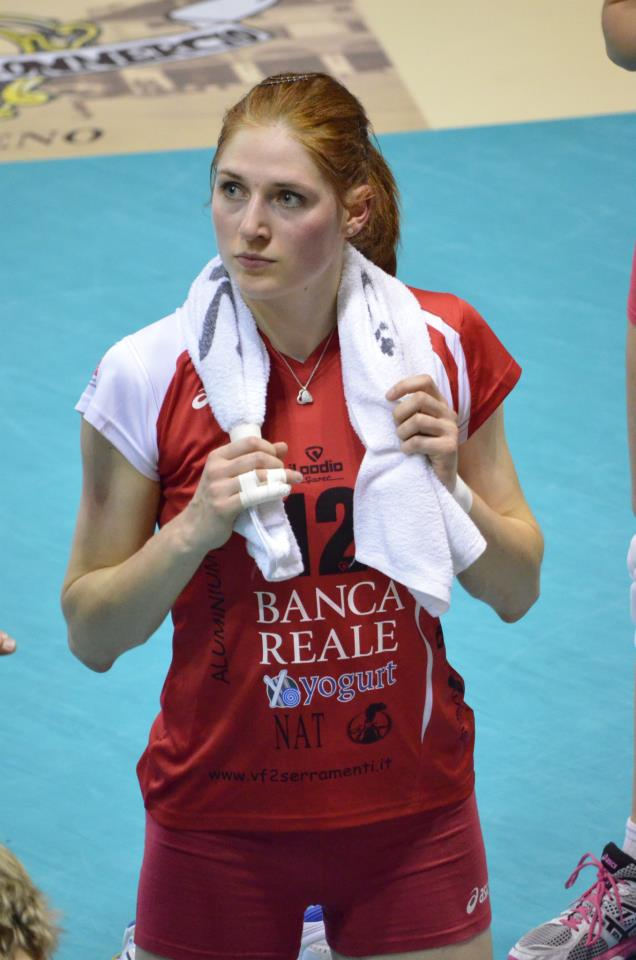

Personal information
- Nationality: German
- Born: 8 July 1990 (age 36); Parchim
- Height: 1.90 m (6 ft 3 in)
- Weight: 75 kg (165 lb)
- Spike: 311 cm (122 in)
- Block: 294 cm (116 in)

Career
Teams
	(Azerbaijan) Lokomotiv Baku
Honours
Women's volleyball
Representing Germany
European Championship
Silver medal – second place	2011 Italy/Serbia	Team
FIVB Grand Prix
Bronze medal – third place	2009 Tokyo	Team competition

Berit Kauffeldt (born 8 July 1990) is a German former volleyball player. She was a member of the Germany women's national volleyball team. She has a master's degree in psychology and a 200 hr yoga teacher certificate.

After her volleyball career ended in 2018, she became a sport psychologist at soccer club Bayer 04 Leverkusen. In 2020 she founded her own business to lead women and men on their way of becoming whole.

== Clubs ==
- (Germany) 1. VC Parchim (2006–2007)
- (Germany) Schweriner SC (2007–2012)
- (Italy) Cuatto Giaveno Volley (2012–2013)
- (Italy) Imoco Volley (2013–2014)
- (Poland) Impel Wrocław (2014–2015)
- (Azerbaijan) Lokomotiv Baku (2015–2016)
