= Encarnación García Bonilla =

Spanish volleyball player (born 1979)

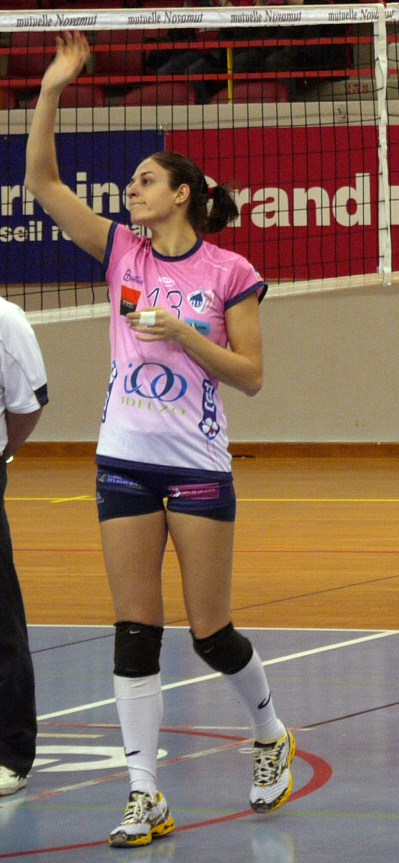

Personal information
- Nationality: Spanish
- Born: 4 October 1979 (age 47)
- Height: 181 cm (71 in)

Volleyball information
- Position: central
- Number: 11 (national team)

Career
Years	Teams
2013	(Spain) Vóley Murcia

National team
2013	Spain

Encarnación García Bonilla (born 4 October 1979) is a Spanish former volleyball player, playing as a central. She was part of the Spain women's national volleyball team.

She competed at the 2013 Women's European Volleyball Championship. On club level she played for Vóley Murcia.
