= Aleksandra Crnčević =

Serbian volleyball player (born 1987)

Personal information
- Nationality: Serbian
- Born: 30 May 1987 (age 39) Sremska Mitrovica
- Height: 185 cm (73 in)
- Weight: 76 kg (168 lb)
- Spike: 304 cm (120 in)
- Block: 294 cm (116 in)

Volleyball information
- Current club: Tianjin Bohai Bank

Career
- Years: Team
- 2015: (Azerbaijan) Lokomotiv Baku
- 2017-2018: (Romania) CSM Volei Alba Blaj

National team
- Years: Team
- –: Serbia

Aleksandra Crnčević (born 30 May 1987) is a Serbian volleyball player. She is part of the Serbia women's national volleyball team. On club level she played for Lokomotiv Baku in 2015.

== Awards ==
=== Clubs ===
- 2017–18 CEV Champions League - Runner-Up, with CSM Volei Alba Blaj
