= Kremena Kamenova =

Bulgarian volleyball player

Personal information
- Nationality: Bulgaria
- Born: 21 May 1988 (age 38) Smolyan, Bulgaria
- Height: 1.85 m (6 ft 1 in)
- Weight: 64 kg (141 lb)
- Spike: 304 cm (120 in)
- Block: 299 cm (118 in)

Volleyball information
- Position: Universal
- Current club: VC Dorozhnik
- Number: 10 (national team)

National team
- Years: Team
- 2014–: Bulgaria

Kremena Kamenova (Bulgarian: Кремена Каменова) (born 21 May 1988 in Smolyan) is a Bulgarian female volleyball player. She is a member of the Bulgaria women's national volleyball team.

She was part of the Bulgarian national team at the 2014 FIVB Volleyball Women's World Championship in Italy. She plays for Maritsa Plovdiv.

== Clubs ==
| Club | From | To |
|---|---|---|
| (Bulgaria) Levski Siconco | 2002–2003 | 2008–2009 |
| (Azerbaijan) Lokomotiv VK | 2009–2010 | 2011–2012 |
| (Romania) CS Știința Bacău | 2012–2013 | 2012–2013 |
| (Russia) Ienisseï Krasnoïarsk | 2013–2014 | 2013–2014 |
| (Romania) CSM București | 2014–2015 | 2014–2015 |
| (Bulgaria) Levski Sofia | oct 2015 | nov 2015 |
| (Turkey) İdmanocağı Spor Kulübü | 2015–2016 | 2015–2016 |
| (Poland) KS Developres Rzeszów | 2016–2017 | 2016–2017 |
| (Bulgaria) VK Maritsa Plovdiv | 2017–2018 | ... |
