= Mariya Filipova =

Bulgarian volleyball player

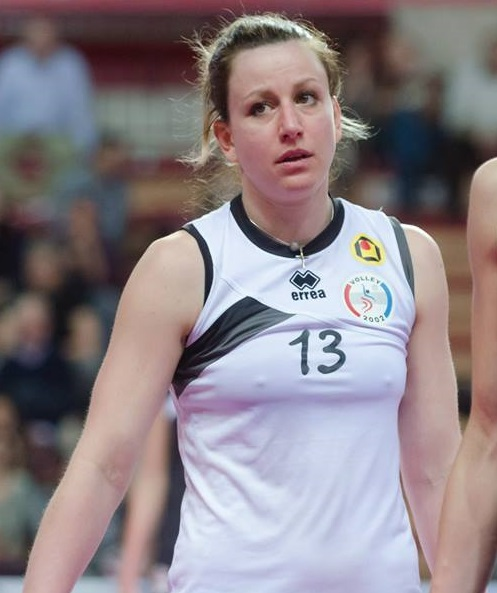

Personal information
- Nationality: Bulgaria
- Born: 10 September 1982 (age 44)
- Height: 1.82 m (6 ft 0 in)
- Weight: 78 kg (172 lb)
- Spike: 295 cm (116 in)
- Block: 275 cm (108 in)

Volleyball information
- Position: Libero
- Number: 13

Career
Years	Teams
2014	(Azerbaijan) Telekom Baku

Mariya Filipova (Bulgarian: Мария Филипова; born 10 September 1982) is a Bulgarian female volleyball player. She is a member of the Bulgaria women's national volleyball team and played for Metal Galați in 2008.

She was part of the Bulgarian national team at the 2014 FIVB Volleyball Women's World Championship in Italy, and at the 2009 Women's European Volleyball Championship.

== Clubs ==
- (Bulgaria) CSKA Sofia (1997-2001)
- (Bulgaria) Levski Volley (2001-2004)
- (Russia) Fakel Novy Ourengoï (2004-2005)
- (France) Hainaut Volley (2005-2006)
- (France) RC Cannes (2006-2007)
- (Greece) Panellinios Athènes (2007-2008)
- (Romania) Metal Galați (2008-2009)
- (Azerbaijan) Lokomotiv Baku (2009-2014)
- (Italy) Volley 2002 Forlì (2014-2015)
- (Azerbaijan) Telekom Baku (2015-2017)
