= Diana Nenova =

Bulgarian volleyball player (born 1985)

Personal information
- Nationality: Bulgaria
- Born: 16 April 1985 (age 41)
- Height: 1.78 m (5 ft 10 in)
- Weight: 70 kg (150 lb)
- Spike: 294 cm (116 in)
- Block: 298 cm (117 in)

Volleyball information
- Number: 1

Career
Years	Teams
2014	(Romania) Dinamo București

Diana Nenova (Bulgarian: Диана Ненова; born 16 April 1985) is a Bulgarian female volleyball player. She is a member of the Bulgaria women's national volleyball team and played for Dinamo București in 2014.

She was part of the Bulgarian national team at the 2014 FIVB Volleyball Women's World Championship in Italy. She competed at the 2009 Women's European Volleyball Championship.

== Clubs ==
- (Romania) Dinamo București (2014)
