= Ayshan Abdulazimova =

Azerbaijani volleyball player (born 1993)

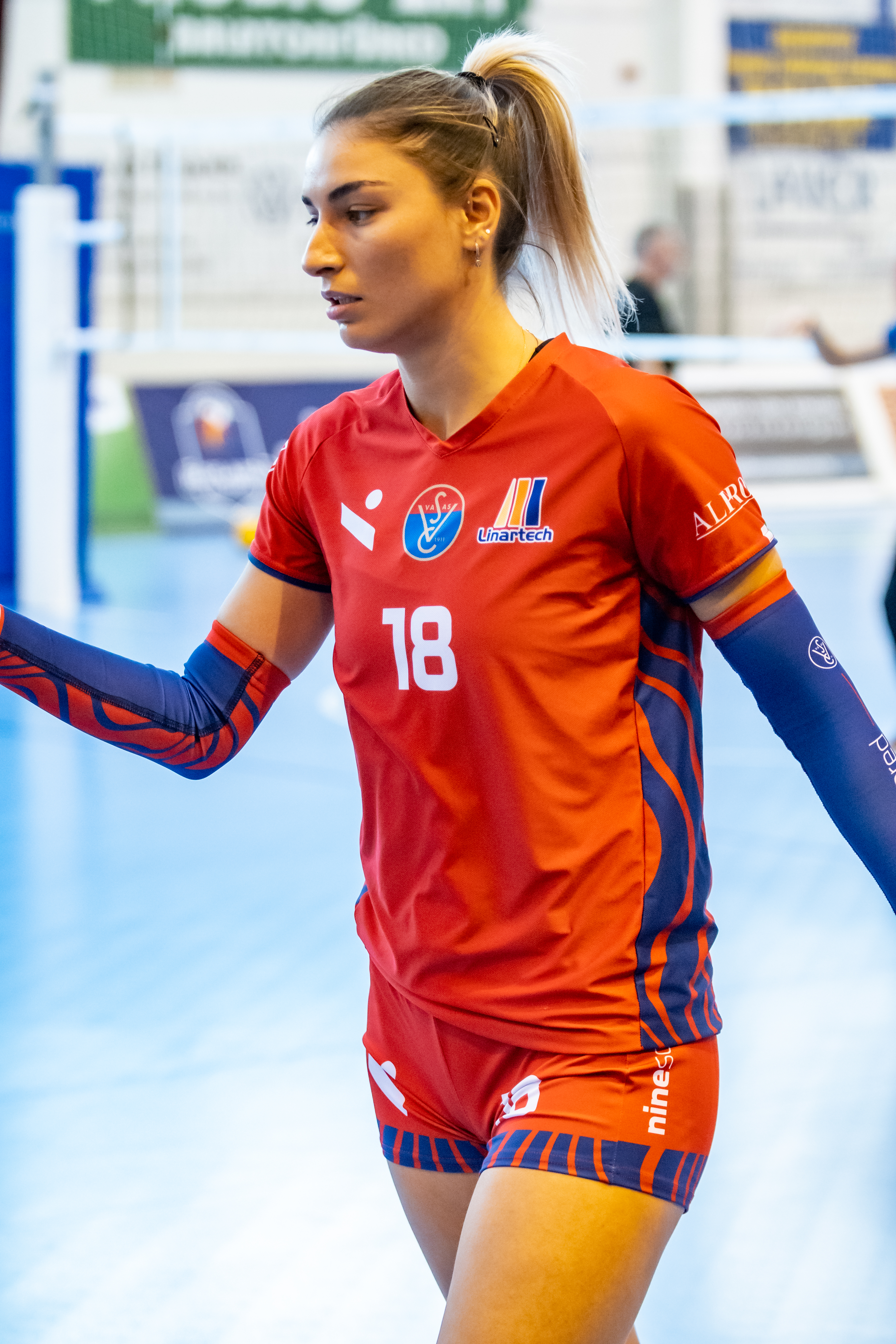

Personal information
- Nationality: Azerbaijani
- Born: 11 April 1993 (age 33) Shaki, Azerbaijan
- Home town: Baku, Azerbaijan
- Height: 1.84 m (6 ft 0 in)
- Weight: 65 kg (143 lb)
- Spike: 290 cm (114 in)
- Block: 280 cm (110 in)

Volleyball information
- Position: Middle blocker
- Current team: Turan Tovuz
- Number: 18

Career
- Years: Team
- 2008–2009 2009–2013 2013–2014 2014–2016 2016–2018 2018–2020 2020–2021 2021–2025 2025–present: Azerrail Baku; Lokomotiv Baku; Azerrail Baku; Lokomotiv Baku; Azerrail Baku; Vasas Obuda; Sarıyer Belediyespor; Vasas Obuda; Turan Tovuz

National team
- Years: Team
- 2011–present: Azerbaijan
Honours
Women's volleyball
Representing Azerbaijan
European League
Gold medal – first place	2016 Nitra	Team
Islamic Solidarity Games
Gold medal – first place	2017 Baku	Team
Bronze medal – third place	2021 Konya	Team
Silver medal – second place	2025 Riyadh	Team

Ayshan Abdulazimova (Azerbaijani: Ayşən Əbdüləzimova; born 11 April 1993) is an Azerbaijani volleyball middle-blocker who currently plays for Turan Tovuz club. She had previously played for the Hungarian team Vasas SC, where she had won five national championships. Abdulazimova has also played for the Azerbaijan women's national volleyball team since 2011, and captained it from 2020.

== Personal life ==
Ayshan Abdulazimova was born on 11 April 1993 in Shaki, Azerbaijan. She was raised in Baku.

== Club career ==
Abdulazimova made her club debut with Azerrail Baku during the 2008–2009 season, where they were the runners-up in the Azerbaijan Women's Volleyball League. For the subsequent season, she transferred to Lokomotiv Baku, where she again was a runner-up in the Women's Volleyball League in the 2009-2010 and 2011-2012 seasons.

In 2018, she joined the Hungarian club Vasas SC. After two seasons with Vasas, she joined the Turkish team Sarıyer Belediyespor during the COVID-19 pandemic. However, she returned to Vasas in 2021. Abdulazimova won five national championships with the club and eventually captained the team. In February 2025, Abdulazimova reached the final of the Hungarian Cup with Vasas after she scored four points. The same year, she decided to leave the club and joined the newly formed club Turan Tovuz.

== International career ==
Ayshan Abdulazimova in a game against Afghanistan at the 2021 Islamic Solidarity Games in Konya

Abdulazimova made her international debut with the Azerbaijani national team in 2011. In July 2016, Azerbaijan won their first ever European Volleyball League title after winning a match against Slovakia.

At the 2017 Islamic Solidarity Games in Baku, the team won the gold medal after defeating Turkey 3-1 in the final.

In January 2020, Abdulazimova was appointed captain of the national team. The following year at the 2021 Islamic Solidarity Games in Konya, they won a bronze medal, after they beat Cameroon 3-0.

In 2025, she was unable to play in the Golden European League due to an injury. Later in the year she was a part of the squad for the 2025 Islamic Solidarity Games in Riyadh. Azerbaijan won a silver medal at the games after losing 0-3 to Turkey.

== Awards ==
=== Club ===
- 2008–09 Azerbaijan Women's Volleyball Super League - Runner-Up, with Azerrail Baku
- 2009–10 Azerbaijan Women's Volleyball Super League - Runner-Up, with Lokomotiv Baku
- 2011–12 Azerbaijan Women's Volleyball Super League - Runner-Up, with Lokomotiv Baku
