= Ana Grbac =

Croatian volleyball player (born 1988)

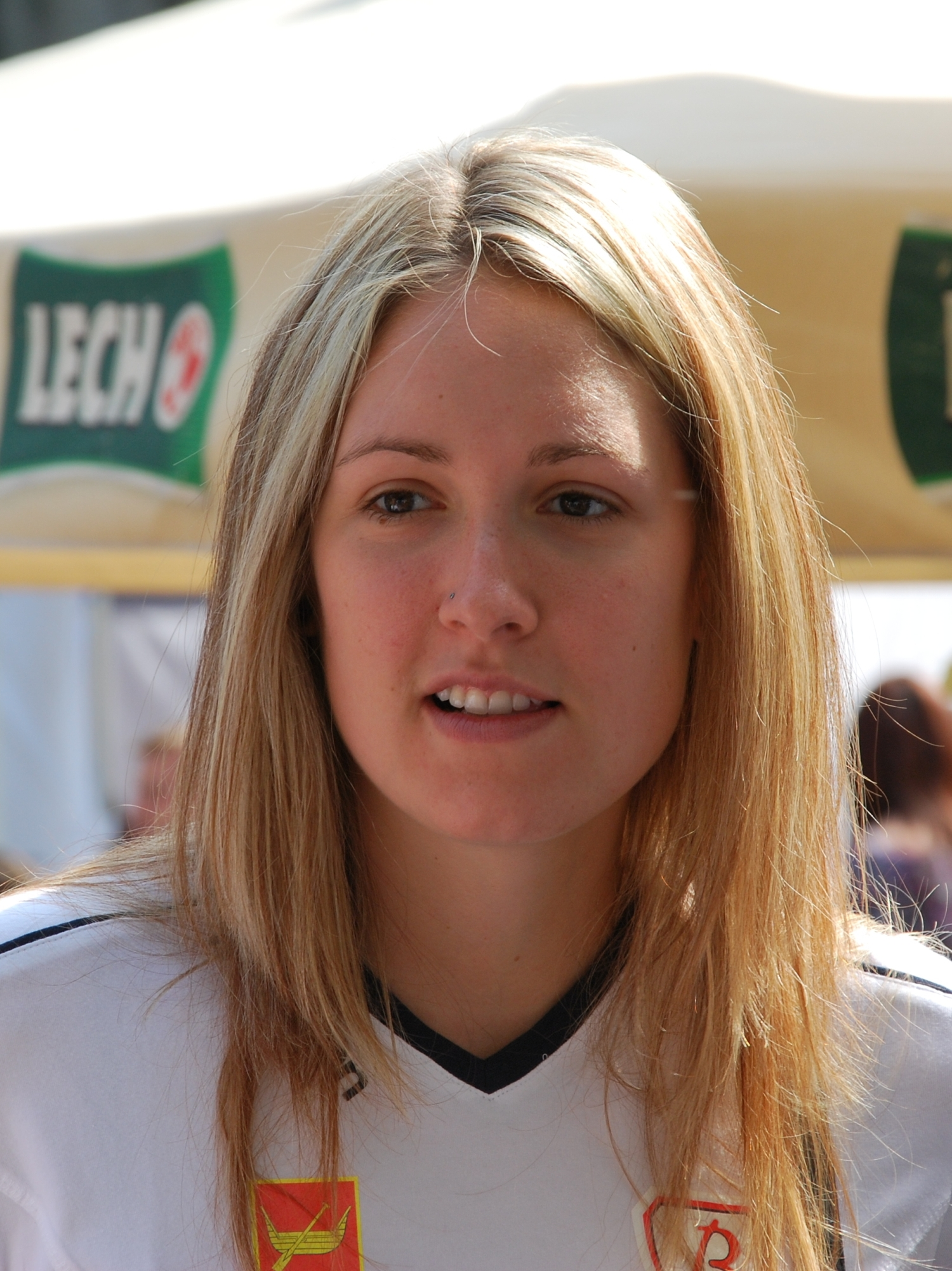

Personal information
- Born: 23 March 1988 (age 38); Rijeka, Croatia
- Height: 1.87 m (6 ft 2 in)
- Weight: 64 kg (141 lb)
- Spike: 298 cm (117 in)
- Block: 288 cm (113 in)

Volleyball information
- Current club: Szent Benedek

Career
Years	Teams
2002–2006; 2006–2008; 2008–2009; 2009–2011; 2011–2012; 2012–2013; 2013–2014; 2014–2015; 2015–2017; 2017–2018; 2018–2019; 2019; 2019–2020; 2020–2021; 2021–2022; 2022–	ŽOK Rijeka; Sirio Perugia; ŽOK Rijeka; Volero Zurich; Budowlani Łódź; Azerrail Baku; Lokomotiv Baku; Volero Zurich; CS Volei Alba-Blaj; MKS Dąbrowa Górnicza; AO Thiras; ŽOK Rijeka; Maccabi AOV Ashdod; GEN-I Volley; 1. MCM-Diamant Kaposvár; Szent Benedek

National team
Croatia
Medal record
Women's volleyball
Representing Croatia
Mediterranean Games
Bronze medal – third place	2009 Pescara	Team
Junior European Championship
Silver medal – second place	2006 France	Team

Ana Grbac (born 23 March 1988) is a Croatian volleyball player. She is a member of the Croatia women's national volleyball team and plays for Hungarian club Szent Benedek.

She was part of the Croatian national team at the 2010 FIVB Volleyball Women's World Championship, and the 2014 FIVB Volleyball Women's World Championship in Italy.
