= Oksana Kiselyova =

Azerbaijani volleyball player (born 1992)

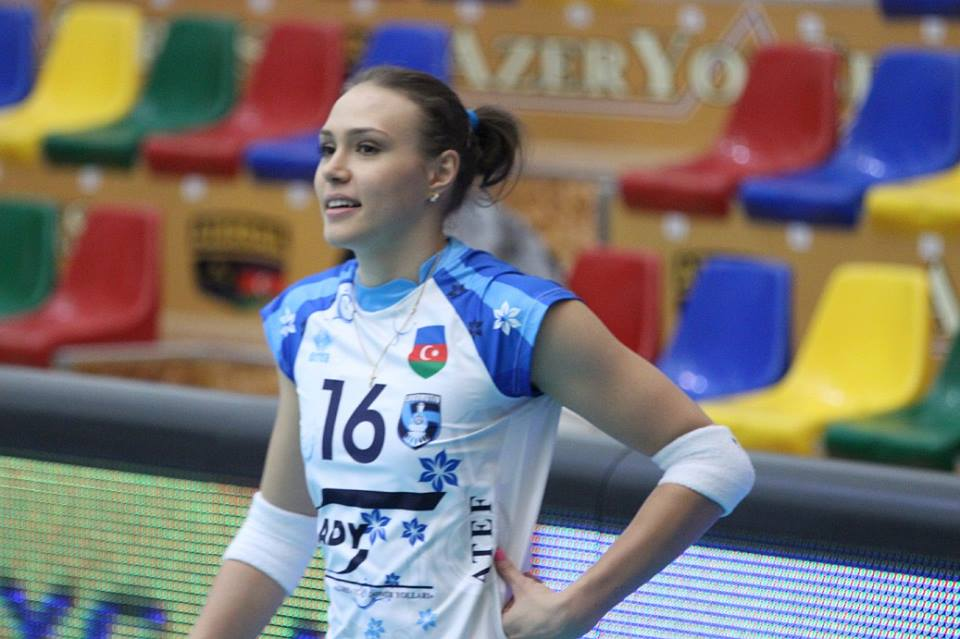

Personal information
- Born: 30 May 1992 (age 34); Baku, Azerbaijan
- Hometown: Baku, Azerbaijan
- Height: 1.77 m (5 ft 10 in)
- Spike: 275 cm (108 in)
- Block: 260 cm (100 in)

Volleyball information
- Position: Libero
- Current team: (Azerbaijan) Lokomotiv Baku
- Number: 16

National team
2006–present	Azerbaijan

Oksana Kiselyova (born 30 May 1992, in Baku, Azerbaijan) is an Azerbaijani volleyball player. She is 177 cm tall and plays as libero. She plays for Lokomotiv Baku.

Kiselyova is a current member of the Azerbaijan women's national volleyball team. Kiselyova is married to Azerbaijani football player Farid Guliyev.

== Clubs ==
Kiselyova has played for the following clubs, all in Azerbaijan:

- Azerrail Baku (2006–2012, 2013–2014)
- Azeryol Baku (2012–2013)
- Lokomotiv Baku (2014–)

== Awards ==
=== Club ===
- 2006–07 Azerbaijan Women's Volleyball Super League - Champion, with Azerrail Baku
- 2007–08 Azerbaijan Women's Volleyball Super League - Champion, with Azerrail Baku
- 2008–09 Azerbaijan Women's Volleyball Super League - Runner-Up, with Azerrail Baku
- 2010–11 Azerbaijan Women's Volleyball Super League - Runner-Up, with Azerrail Baku
- 2014–15 Azerbaijan Women's Volleyball Super League - Runner-Up, with Lokomotiv Baku
