= Ivana Miloš =

Croatian volleyball player

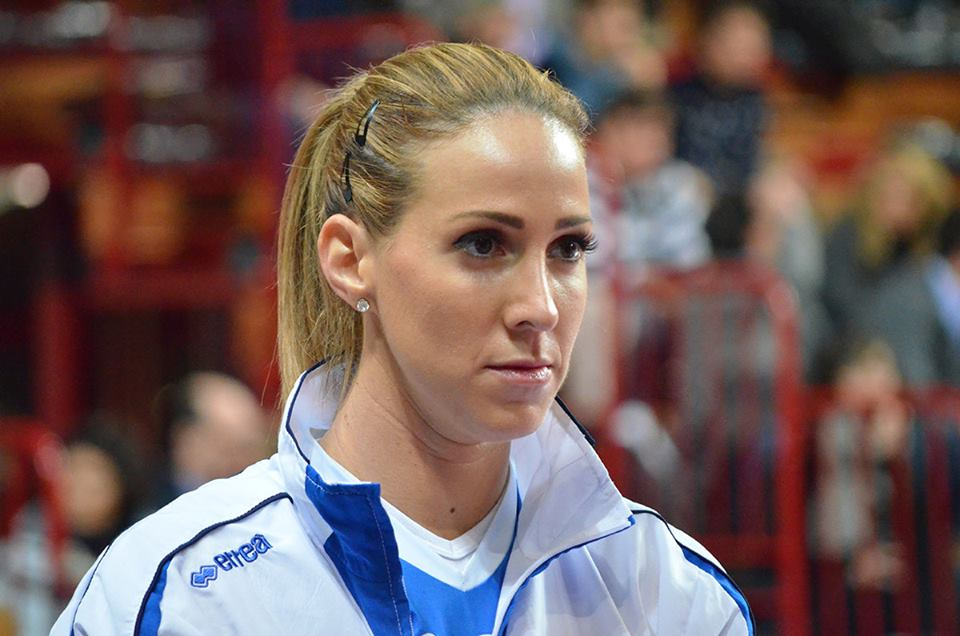

Personal information
- Full name: Ivana Miloš Prokopić
- Nationality: Croatia
- Born: 7 March 1986 (age 40); Rijeka, Croatia
- Hometown: Rijeka, Croatia
- Height: 1.87 m (6 ft 2 in)
- Weight: 70 kg (154 lb)
- Spike: 312 cm (123 in)
- Block: 296 cm (117 in)
Medal record
Women's volleyball
Representing Croatia
Mediterranean Games
Bronze medal – third place	2009 Pescara	Team

Ivana Miloš Prokopić (born 7 March 1986 in Rijeka) is a Croatian volleyball player. She is a member of the Croatia women's national volleyball team and played for AGIL Novara in 2014. She was part of the Croatian national team at the 2014 FIVB Volleyball Women's World Championship in Italy.

== Clubs ==
- (Croatia) ŽOK Rijeka (2001–2010)
- (Azerbaijan) Igtisadchi Baku (2010–2011)
- (Azerbaijan) Lokomotiv Baku (2011–2012)
- (Italy) Volley 2002 Forlì (2012–2013)
- (Italy) AGIL Novara (2013–2014)
- (Turkey) Bursa BB (2014–2015)
- (Turkey) Nilüfer Belediyespor (2015–2016)
- (Turkey) Bursa BB (2016-)

=== Awards ===
- 2016–17 CEV Women's Challenge Cup - Champion, with Bursa BB
