= Lisa Thomsen =

German volleyball player (born 1985)

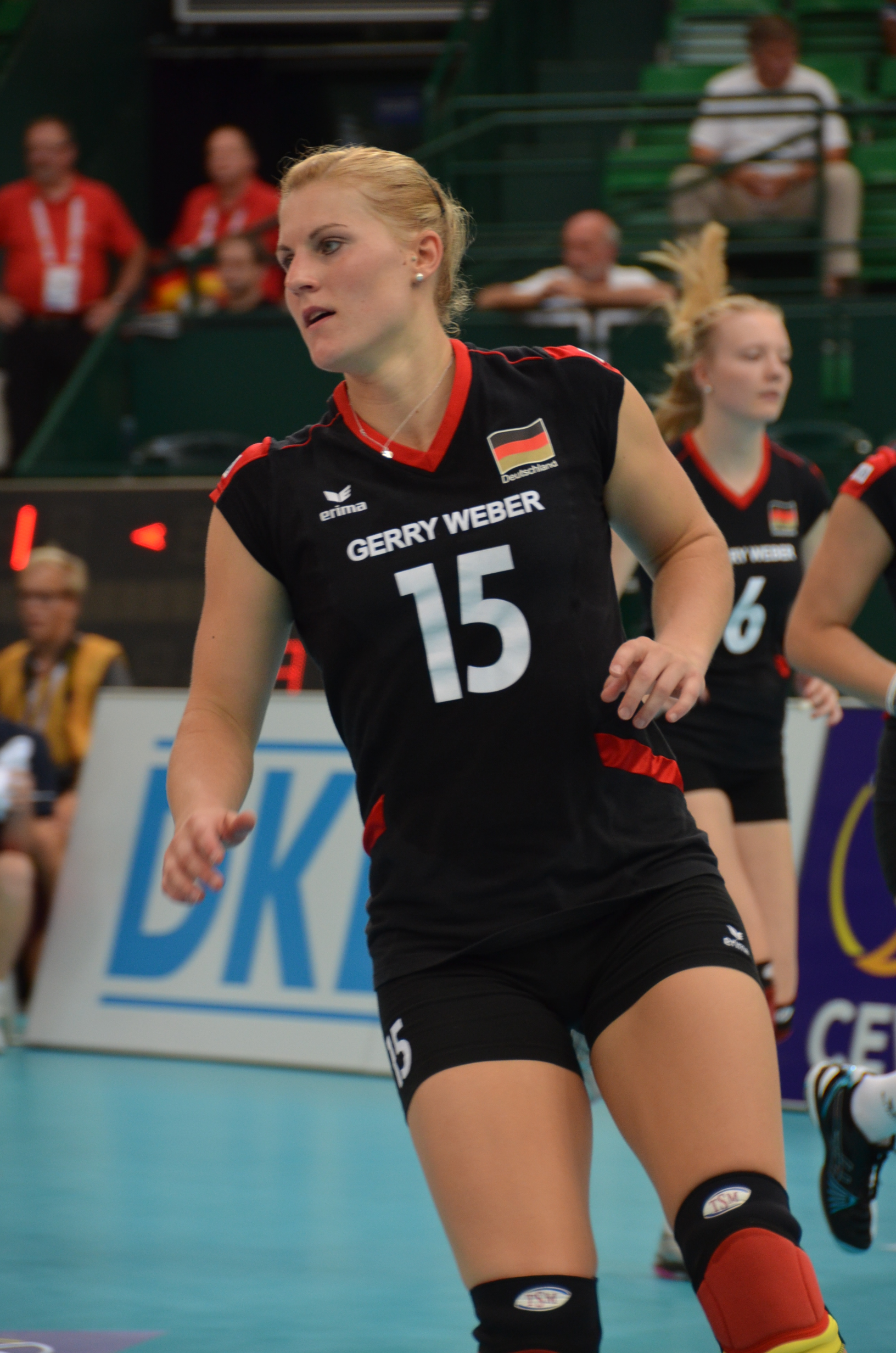
- Lisa Thomsen in September 2013

Personal information
- Nationality: Germany
- Born: 20 August 1985 (age 41); Aachen, West Germany
- Height: 1.72 m (5 ft 8 in)
- Weight: 68 kg (150 lb)
- Spike: 290 cm (114 in)
- Block: 285 cm (112 in)

Volleyball information
- Number: 15

Career
Years	Teams
2015	(Germany) Allianz MTV Stuttgart
Medal record
Women's volleyball
Representing Germany
European Championship
Silver medal – second place	2011 Italy/Serbia	Team
Silver medal – second place	2013 Germany	Team

Lisa Thomsen (born 20 August 1985) is a German volleyball player. She is a member of the Germany women's national volleyball team and played for Lokomotiv Baku in 2014. She was part of the German national team at the 2014 FIVB Volleyball Women's World Championship in Italy.

== Clubs ==
- (Germany) Bayer 04 Leverkusen (2003–2006)
- (Germany) USC Münster (2006–2009)
- (Germany) Schweriner SC (2009–2013)
- (Azerbaijan) Azeryol Baku (2013–2014)
- (Azerbaijan) Lokomotiv Baku (2014–2015)
- (Germany) Allianz MTV Stuttgart (2015–2016)
