= Frauke Dirickx =

Belgian volleyball player (born 1980)

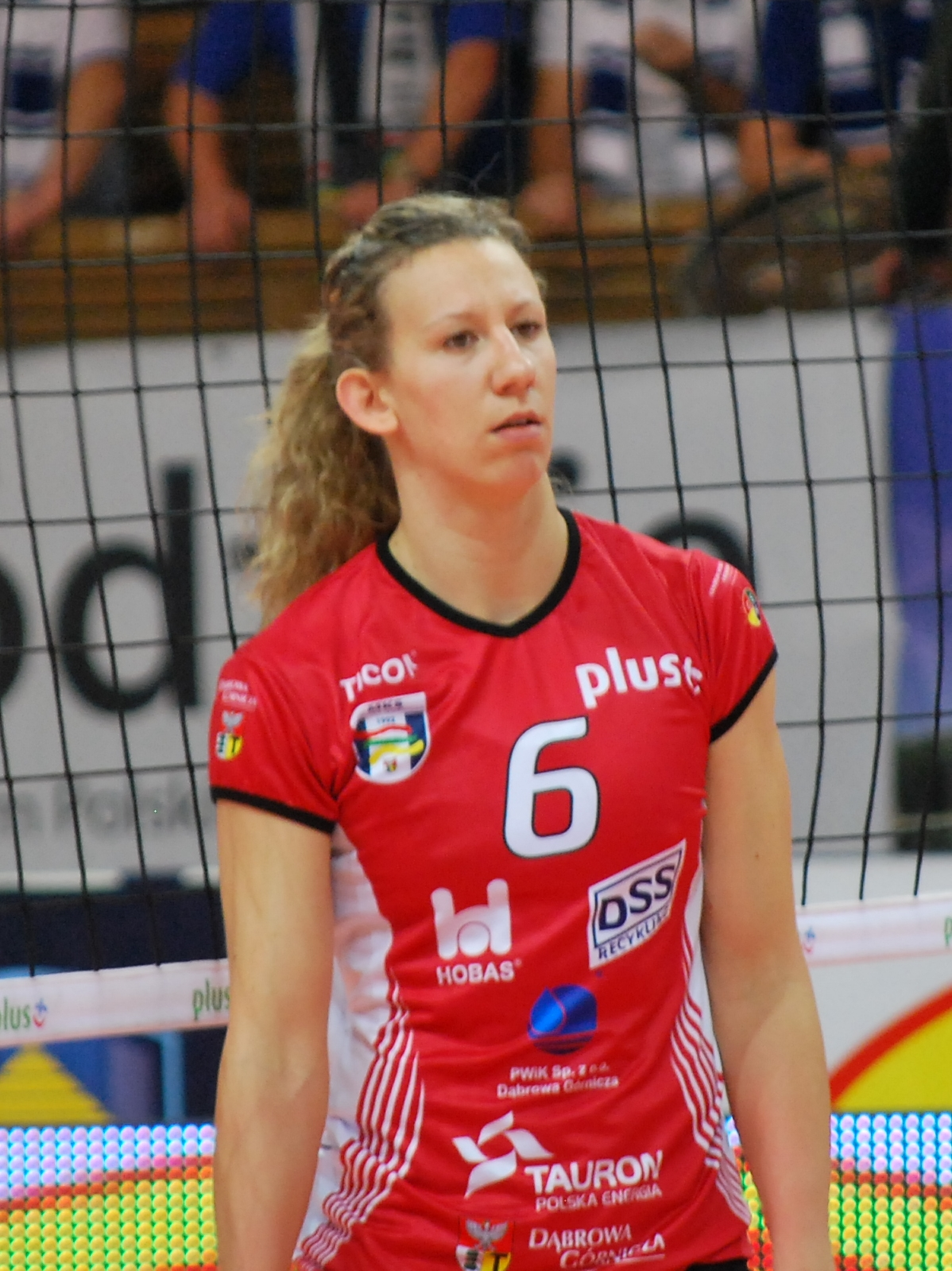
- Dirickx in 2011

Personal information
- Nationality: Belgian
- Born: 3 January 1980 (age 46); Halle, Belgium
- Hometown: Halle, Belgium
- Height: 1.86 m (6 ft 1 in)
- Weight: 70 kg (154 lb)
- Spike: 298 cm (117 in)
- Block: 270 cm (106 in)

Volleyball information
- Position: Setter
- Current club: Bursa BBSK
- Number: 6

National team
2000–2016	Belgium
Medal record
Women's volleyball
Representing Belgium
European Championship
Bronze medal – third place	2013 Germany	Team
- Last updated: 14 September 2013

Frauke Dirickx (born 3 January 1980 in Halle) is a volleyball player from Belgium. She was the captain for the national team from-2007-2012. She finished in seventh place with the Women's National Team at the 2007 European Championship in Belgium and Luxembourg. She is 1.86 m and plays as setter for Spes Volley Conegliano.

With Fenerbahçe Acibadem she won the 2009–10 Turkish League, Cup and Super Cup Championship.

== Clubs ==
- (Belgium) Isola Tongeren (1996–1997)
- (Belgium) Kärcher Herentals (1997–2000)
- (Italy) Minetti Vicenza (2000–2002)
- (Italy) Cerdisa Reggio Emilia (2002–2003)
- (Italy) Kab Holding Sassuolo (2003–2004)
- (Italy) Minetti Infoplus Vicenza (2004–2005)
- (Spain) Grupo 2002 Murcia (2005–2007)
- (Italy) Futura Volley Busto Arsizio (2007–2008)
- (Romania) Metal Galaţi (2008–2009)
- (Turkey) Fenerbahçe Acıbadem (2009–2010)
- (Italy) Spes Volley Conegliano (2010–2011)
- (Poland) Dabrowa Górnicza (2011–2013)
- (Poland) Impel Wroclaw (2013–2014)
- (Italy) River Volley Piacenza (2014–2015)
- (Turkey) Bursa BBSK (2015–2016)

== Awards ==
=== Clubs ===
- 2001 Italian Supercup – Champion, with Minetti Vicenza
- 2006 Spanish Supercup – Champion, with Grupo 2002 Murcia
- 2007 Spanish Queen Cup – Champion Grupo Murcia 2002
- 2007 Top Teams Cup – Champion, with Grupo 2002 Murcia
- 2007 Spanish Superliga – Champion, with Grupo 2002 Murcia
- 2009 Romanian Championship – Champion, with Metal Galaţi
- 2010 Turkish Super Cup – Champion, with Fenerbahçe Acıbadem
- 2010 Turkish Cup – Champion, with Fenerbahçe Acıbadem
- 2010 CEV Champions League – Runner-Up, with Fenerbahçe Acıbadem
- 2010 Turkish Championship – Champion, with Fenerbahçe Acıbadem
