= Aneta Havlíčková =

Czech volleyball player (born 1987)

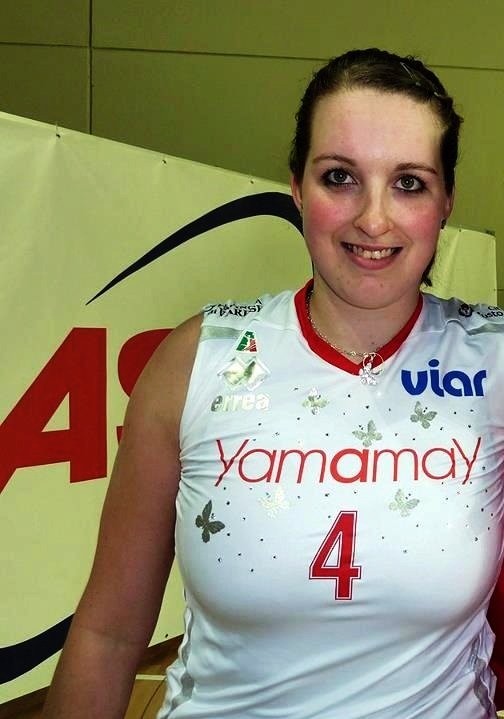

Personal information
- Born: 3 July 1987 (age 39); Mladá Boleslav, Czech Republic
- Height: 1.93 m (6 ft 4 in)

Volleyball information
- Position: Opposite
- Current club: (Azerbaijan) Lokomotiv Baku

Aneta Havlíčková (born 3 July 1987) is a Czech female volleyball player. She is 193 cm (6.33 ft) tall and plays as an opposite. She currently plays for Lokomotiv Baku.

== Career ==
Havlíčková won the 2015–16 Azerbaijan Super League bronze medal with Lokomotiv Baku and she was awarded Best Scorer.

== Clubs ==
- (Czech Republic) Policejní Volejbalový Klub Olymp Praga (2006–2007)
- (Italy) Tiboni Urbino (2009–2010)
- (Italy) Yamamay Busto Arsizio (2010–2012)
- (Azerbaijan) Lokomotiv Baku (2012–2013)
- (Turkey) Fenerbahçe (2013-2014)
- (Azerbaijan) Lokomotiv Baku (2014-2016)
- (Italy) Savino Del Bene Scandicci (2016-2017)
- (Turkey) Türk Hava Yolları (2017-2018)

== Awards ==
=== Individuals ===
- 2012 European League "Most Valuable Player"
- 2011–12 CEV Cup "Most Valuable Player"
- 2012–13 Azerbaijan Women's Volleyball Super League "Best Scorer"
- 2015–16 Azerbaijan Super League "Best Scorer"

=== National ===
- 2012 European League - Champion

=== Clubs ===
- 2011-12 Italian Championship - Champion, with Yamamay Busto Arsizio
- 2011-12 Italian Cup - Champion, with Yamamay Busto Arsizio
- 2011–12 CEV Cup - Champion, with Yamamay Busto Arsizio
- 2013–14 CEV Cup - Champion, with Fenerbahçe
- 2015–16 Azerbaijan Super League – Bronze medal, with Lokomotiv Baku
