= Quinta Steenbergen =

Dutch volleyball player

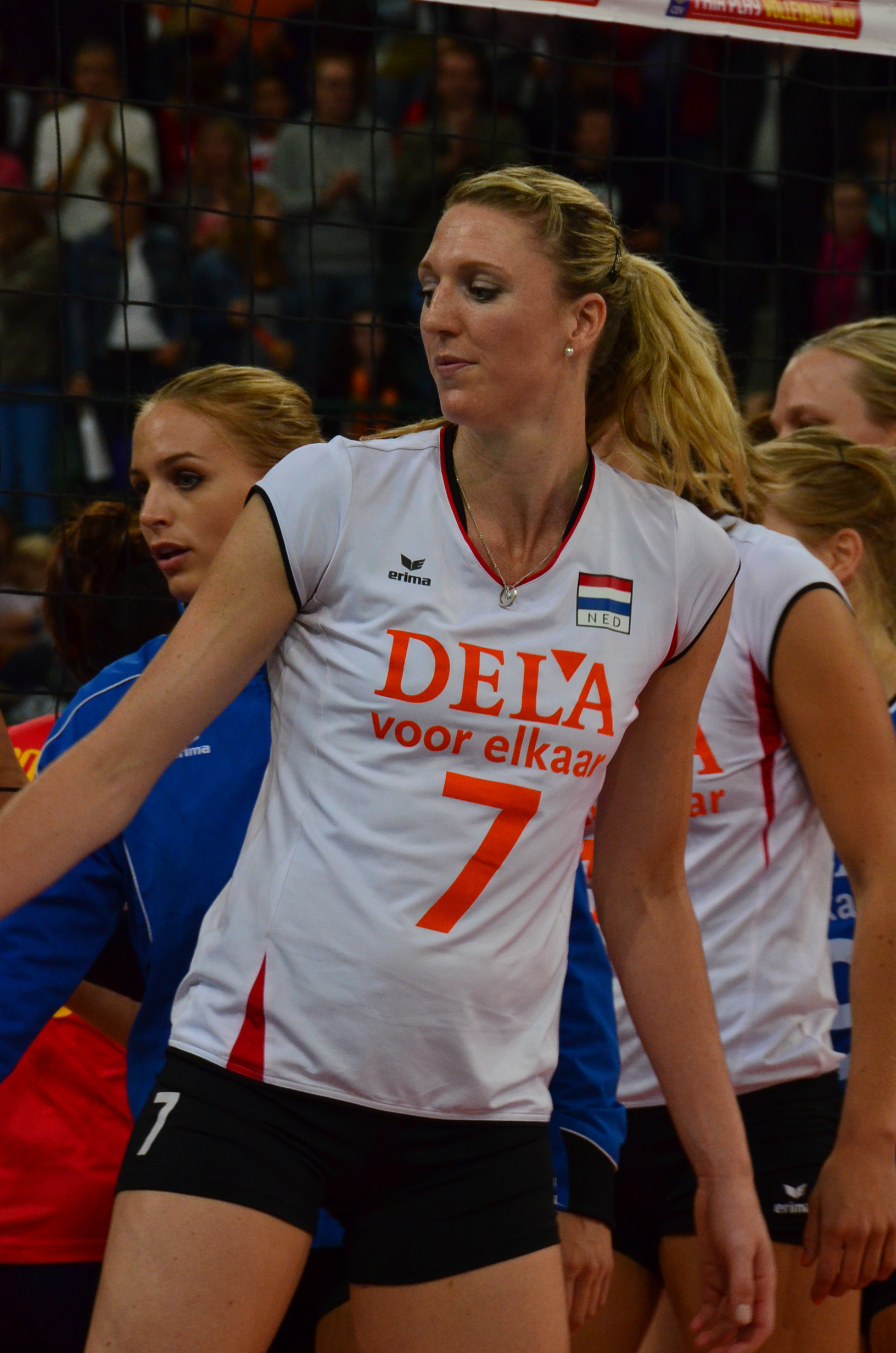
- Steenbergen in September 2013

Personal information
- Nationality: Dutch
- Born: 2 April 1985 (age 41); Schagen, Netherlands
- Height: 1.89 m (6 ft 2 1/2 in)
- Weight: 74 kg (163 lb)
- Spike: 316 cm (124 in)
- Block: 300 cm (120 in)

Volleyball information
- Position: Middle Blocker
- Current club: (Czech Republic) VK AGEL Prostějov
- Number: 7
Honours
Women's volleyball
Representing the Netherlands
FIVB Volleyball World Grand Prix
Bronze medal – third place	2016 Bangkok	Team
European Championship
Silver medal – second place	2015 Belgium / Netherlands	Team competition

Quinta Steenbergen (born 2 April 1985 in Schagen) is a Dutch volleyball player, who plays as a Center. She was a member of the Women's National Team. She plays for VK AGEL Prostějov.

== Personal ==
Steenbergen has one older brother and two older sisters.

== Clubs ==
- (Netherlands) AMVJ Amstelveen (2001–2003)
- (Netherlands) VC Weert (2003–2004)
- (Netherlands) AMVJ Amstelveen (2004–2008)
- (France) Rocheville Le Cannet (2008–2009)
- (Netherlands) TVC Amstelveen (2010–2011)
- (Azerbaijan) VC Baku (2011–2012)
- (Germany) Schweriner SC (2012–2013)
- (Czech Republic) VK AGEL Prostějov (2013–2014)
- (Azerbaijan) Lokomotiv Baku (2014–2015)
- (Czech Republic) VK AGEL Prostějov (2015–2016)
