= Kseniya Kovalenko =

Russian footballer (born 1995)

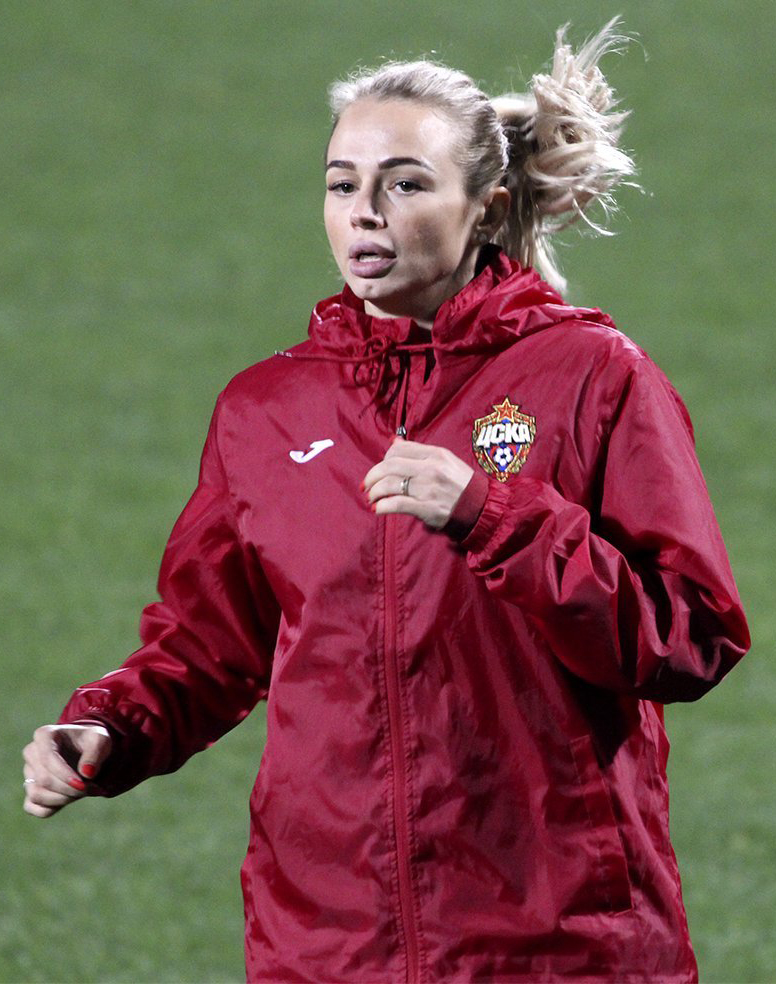

Personal information
- Full name: Kseniya Alekseyevna Kovalenko
- Date of birth: 26 May 1995 (age 31)
- Place of birth: Aksu, Kazakhstan,
- Position: Midfielder

Team information
- Current team: CSKA Moscow

Senior career*
Years	Team	Apps	(Gls)
2013–2014	Izmailovo	10	(0)
2014–2016	Rossiyanka	27	(3)
2017–	CSKA Moscow	42	(2)

International career^{‡}
2011–2012	Russia U17	6	(0)
2013–2014	Russia U19	9	(4)
2015–	Russia	11	(0)
- * Club domestic league appearances and goals as of 29 January 2020 (UTC) ‡ National team caps and goals as of 29 January 2020 (UTC)

Kseniya Alekseyevna Kovalenko (Russian: Ксения Алексеевна Коваленко; born 26 May 1995) is a Russian footballer who plays as a midfielder and has appeared for the Russia women's national team.

== Career ==
Kovalenko has been capped for the Russia national team, appearing for the team during the 2019 FIFA Women's World Cup qualifying cycle.
