= Polina Rahimova =

Azerbaijani volleyball player (born 1990)

Polina Rəhimova
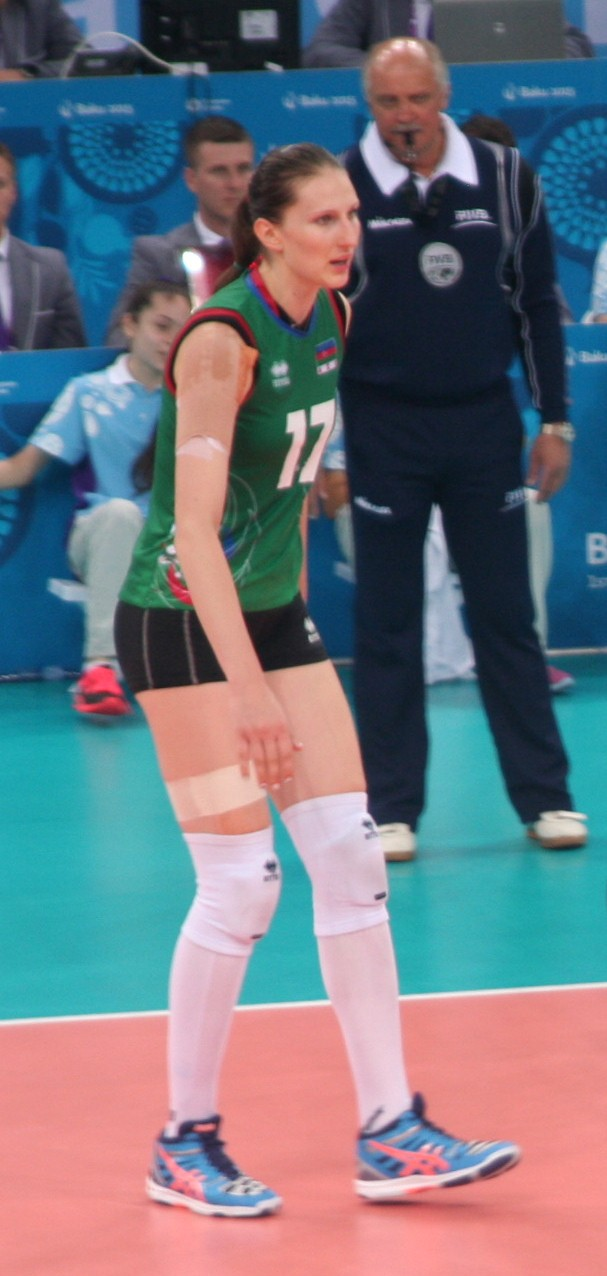

Personal information
- Nationality: Azerbaijani
- Born: 5 June 1990 (age 36); Fergana, Uzbek SSR
- Height: 1.98 m (6 ft 6 in)
- Weight: 97 kg (214 lb)
- Spike: 318 cm (125 in)
- Block: 302 cm (119 in)

Volleyball information
- Position: Opposite spiker
- Current team: (Azerbaijan) DH Volley
- Number: 17

National team
2007–2026	Azerbaijan
Honours
Women's volleyball
Representing Azerbaijan
European League
Gold medal – first place	2016 Nitra
Islamic Solidarity Games
Gold medal – first place	2017 Baku	Team

Polina Rahimova (Azerbaijani: Polina Rəhimova; born 5 June 1990) is an Azerbaijani volleyball player that plays for DH Volley and Azerbaijan women's national volleyball team.

== Career ==
Rahimova has played at 17 clubs across 9 countries and three continents, winning numerous team and individual accolades.

Polina has won 54 individual awards throughout her career, including MVP of the season titles in the leagues of Azerbaijan (twice), Korea and Vietnam. She was also selected as the MVP of the 2010-11 season in the CEV Challenge Cup where her team won gold medals. Polina has won national leagues and cups in Azerbaijan, Turkey, Vietnam, Korea, Indonesia and Greece.

In December 2015, Rahimova set a world record by scoring 58 points in a single match.

A core member of Azerbaijan women's national team, Polina made her debut in 2007 and participated in 9 editions of European Championships and two World Cups. She announced her retirement from the national team after the 2026 European Championship.

== List of Clubs ==
Season	Club
2005 – 2007	(Azerbaijan) Nagliyatchi VC
2007 – 2014	(Azerbaijan) Azerrail Baku
2014 – 2015	(South Korea) Suwon Hyundai
2015 – 2017	(Japan) Queenseis Kariya
2017 – 2018	(Turkey) Fenerbahçe Women's Volleyball
2018 – 2019	(Italy) Volleyball Casalmaggiore
2019	(Turkey) Türk Hava Yolları
2019 – 2021	(Brazil) Associação Vôlei Bauru
2021 – 2022	(Italy) Volleyball Casalmaggiore
2021 – 2022	(Vietnam) Geleximco Thái Bình
2022 – 2023	(Turkey) Kuzeyboru GSK
2023	(Vietnam) Hoa Chat Duc Giang Tia Sang
2023 – 2024	(Turkey) Karayolları SK
2024	(Indonesia) Gresik Petrokimia
2024 – 2025	(Brazil) Osasco Voleibol Clube
2025 – 2026	(Greece) Panionios F.C.
2026 – 2027	(Azerbaijan) DH Volley

== Awards ==
=== Individuals ===
- 2008–09 Novotel Cup "Best Scorer"
- 2008–09 Novotel Cup "Most Valuable Player"
- 2008–09 Dubai Volley Tournament "Best Blocker"
- 2009–10 Azerbaijan Superleague "Best Scorer"
- 2009–10 Azerbaijan Cup "Best Scorer"
- 2010 World Championship qualification "Best Server and Best Spiker"
- 2010–11 Azerbaijan Superleague "Best Scorer and Best Server"
- 2011–12 Azerbaijan Superleague "Best Server"
- 2014–15 V-League "Best Scorer, Best Server and Best Spiker"
- 2016 European League "Most Valuable Player"
- 2022 Vietnam League "Best Spiker"
- 2023 Vietnam League "Best Spiker"

=== Clubs ===
- 2005–06 Azerbaijan Superleague – Bronze medal, with Nagliyatchi VC
- 2007–08 Azerbaijan Superleague – Champion, with Azerrail Baku
- 2008–09 Azerbaijan Superleague – Runner-Up, with Azerrail Baku
- 2008–09 Novotel Cup – Champion, with Azerrail Baku
- 2008–09 Dubai Volley Tournament – Runner-Up, with Azerrail Baku
- 2009–10 Azerbaijan Cup – Champion, with Azerrail Baku
- 2010–11 Azerbaijan Superleague – Runner-Up, with Azerrail Baku
- 2010–11 Challenge Cup – Champion, with Azerrail Baku
- 2012–13 Azerbaijan Superleague – Bronze medal, with Azerrail Baku
- 2013–14 Azerbaijan Superleague – Runner-Up, with Azeryol Baku
- 2014–15 V-League – Bronze medal, with Suwon Hyundai E&C
- 2022 Vietnam League – Champion, with Geleximco Thái Bình
- 2023 Vietnam League – Runner-Up, with Đức Giang Chemical
- 2024-25 Brazilian Super League – Champion, with Osasco Voleibol Clube
- 2024-25 Brazilian Cup – Champion, with Osasco Voleibol Clube
- 2025-26 Greek Cup – Champion, with Panathinaikos
- 2025-26 Greek Super Cup – Champion, with Panathinaikos
- 2025–26 CEV Challenge Cup – Runner up, with Panathinaikos

=== National ===
- 2016 European League – Champion, with Azerbaijan
- 2017 Islamic Solidarity Games – Champion, with Azerbaijan
