= Kseniya Poznyak =

Belarusian-born Azerbaijani volleyball player

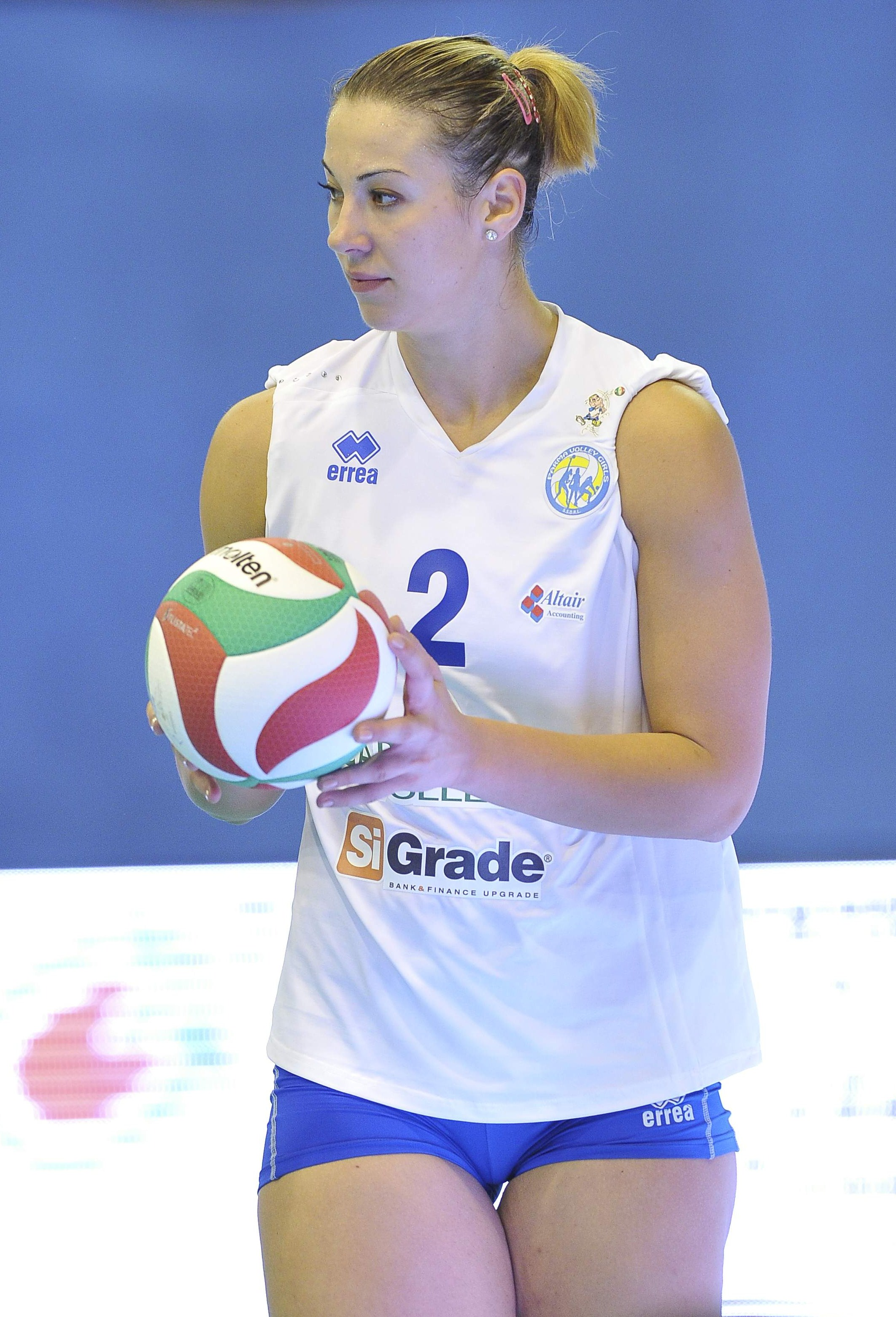
- Koçyiğit in 2011

Personal information
- Full name: Kseniya Poznyak
- Nationality: Azerbaijani
- Born: November 21, 1986 (age 39); Byaroza, Belarus
- Height: 1.9 m (6 ft 3 in)
- Weight: 81 kg (179 lb)
- Spike: 305 cm (120 in)
- Block: 295 cm (116 in)

Volleyball information
- Position: Middle hitter

Career
Years	Teams
2003–2009; 2009–2011; 2011–2012; 2013; 2013–2015; 2015–2016; 2017; 2017–2018; 2018–2019; 2019–2020	Azerrail Baku; Lokomotiv Baku; Parma Volley; Azerrail Baku; Azeryol Baku; Azerrail Baku; Beşiktaş JK; Leningradka Saint Petersburg; Generika-Ayala Lifesavers; Thompson Rivers WolfPack

National team
2004–2017	Azerbaijan
Honours
Women's volleyball
Representing Azerbaijan
European League
Gold medal – first place	2016 Nitra
Islamic Solidarity Games
Gold medal – first place	2017 Baku	Team
- Last updated: 14 August 2022

Kseniya Poznyak (née Kovalenko; born 21 November 1986) is a Belarusian-born Azerbaijani former professional volleyball player. She represented Azerbaijan women's national team on international level and was part of the squad at the 2006 and 2018 FIVB World Championships, as well as 6 editions of the European Championship (2005, 2009, 2011, 2013, 2015, 2017).

== Career ==
=== Azerbaijani volleyball clubs ===
Koçyiğit's professional career debuted in 2003 with Azerrail Baku. She won five Azerbaijan Championships and also played at the 2006–2007 Champions League where she won the Best Blocker award. She stayed with the club until 2008.

In 2009, she transferred to Lokomotiv Baku and played with the team for two years. The club won bronze and silver medals at the 2009 and 2010 seasons respectively. She won the Best Blocker award in both tournaments. The squad also joined the 2011 CEV Women's Challenge Cup and won the silver medal.

In 2013, she joined Azerrail Baku again. She stayed with the club for a year then transferred to Azeryol Baku where she played at the 2014 Azerbaijan Super League and won the silver medal.

In 2015, she returned to Azerrail Baku and won the championship at the 2016 Azerbaijan Super League.

=== Foreign volleyball clubs ===
Koçyiğit started to play outside Azerbaijan in 2011, where she joined the Italian volleyball club, Parma Volley, that used to play in the Serie A1.

In 2017, she joined the Turkish volleyball club, Beşiktaş JK, that plays in the Turkish Women's Volleyball League. The team finished at 7th place.

In 2018, she went to Russia and joined Leningradka Saint Petersburg, a club that plays in the Russian Super League. The team finished at 7th place.

In 2019, she went to the Philippines and joined Generika-Ayala Lifesavers, a volleyball club that plays in the Philippine Super Liga. She currently plays in the Grand Prix Conference.

=== National team ===
Koçyiğit has been part of the Azerbaijan national volleyball team since 2004. The squad participated at the 2006 World Championship and 2009 European Championship.

The national team won the championship at the 2016 European Volleyball League, Azerbaijan's first European League title.

== Clubs ==
- (Azerbaijan) Azerrail Baku (2003–2009)
- (Azerbaijan) Lokomotiv Baku (2009–2011)
- (Italy) Parma Volley (2011–2012)
- (Azerbaijan) Azerrail Baku (2013)
- (Azerbaijan) Azeryol Baku (2013–2015)
- (Azerbaijan) Azerrail Baku (2015–2016)
- (Turkey) Beşiktaş JK (2017)
- (Russia) Leningradka Saint Petersburg (2017–2018)
- (Philippines) Generika-Ayala Lifesavers (2019)

== Awards ==
=== Individuals ===
- 2006–2007 Champions League "Best Blocker"
- 2008–2009 Azerbaijan Super League "Best Blocker"
- 2009–2010 Azerbaijan Super League "Best Blocker"
- 2009–2010 Azerbaijan Cup "Best Blocker"
- 2010 Supergirls of Azerbaijan "Best Blocker"

=== National team ===
- 2016 European Volleyball League – Champion, with Azerbaijan Women's National Volleyball Team

=== Clubs ===
- 2004 Azerbaijan Championship – Champion, with Azerrail Baku
- 2005 Azerbaijan Championship – Champion, with Azerrail Baku
- 2006 Azerbaijan Championship – Champion, with Azerrail Baku
- 2007 Azerbaijan Championship – Champion, with Azerrail Baku
- 2008 Azerbaijan Championship – Champion, with Azerrail Baku
- 2009 Azerbaijan Championship – Third, with Lokomotiv Baku
- 2010 Azerbaijan Championship – Runner-up, with Lokomotiv Baku
- 2011 CEV Women's Challenge Cup – Runner-up, with Lokomotiv Baku
- 2014 Azerbaijan Super League – Runner-up, with Azeryol Baku
- 2016 Azerbaijan Super League – Champion, with Azerrail Baku
