= Natavan Gasimova =

Azerbaijani volleyball player (born 1985)

Natəvan Qasımova
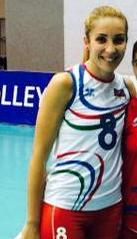

Personal information
- Born: July 8, 1985 (age 41); Nakhchivan, Azerbaijan SSR
- Hometown: Baku, Azerbaijan
- Height: 1.78 m (5 ft 10 in)
- Spike: 287 cm (113 in)
- Block: 275 cm (108 in)

Volleyball information
- Position: Setter
- Current team: (Azerbaijan) Azeryol Baku
- Number: 8

National team
2004–present	Azerbaijan

Natavan Gasimova (Azerbaijani: Natəvan Qasımova; born 8 July 1985, in Nakhchivan, Azerbaijan SSR) is an Azerbaijani indoor volleyball player of Azeryol Baku from Azerbaijan.

Gasimova is a current member of the Azerbaijan women's national volleyball team.

== Clubs ==
- (Azerbaijan) Azerrail Baku (2004–2011)
- (Italy) Scavolini Pesaro (2011)
- (Azerbaijan) VC Baku (2011–2012)
- (Azerbaijan) Azeryol Baku (2012–)

== Awards ==
=== Club ===
- '2004–05 Azerbaijan Women's Volleyball Super League - Champion, with Azerrail Baku
- '2005–06 Azerbaijan Women's Volleyball Super League - Champion, with Azerrail Baku
- '2006–07 Azerbaijan Women's Volleyball Super League - Champion, with Azerrail Baku
- '2007–08 Azerbaijan Women's Volleyball Super League - Champion, with Azerrail Baku
- '2011–12 Challenge Cup - Runner-Up, with VC Baku
- '2013–14 Azerbaijan Women's Volleyball Super League - Runner-Up, with Azeryol Baku

== See also ==
- Azeryol Baku
- Azerbaijan women's national volleyball team
