= Bayaz Guluyeva =

Azerbaijani volleyball player

Personal information
- Nationality: Azerbaijani
- Born: 6 September 1990 (age 36); Baku, Azerbaijan
- Height: 1.78 m (5 ft 10 in)
- Weight: 65 kg (143 lb)
- Spike: 297 cm (117 in)
- Block: 293 cm (115 in)

Volleyball information
- Position: Middle-blocker
- Current team: (Azerbaijan) DH Volley
- Number: 19

National team
2019–	Azerbaijan

Mariya Kirilyuk (born 6 September 1990) is an Azerbaijani volleyball player that plays as a libero for DH Volley and Azerbaijan women's national volleyball team.

== Career ==
Bayaz Guluyeva (Aliyeva) began her professional career at Telekom Baku. She currently plays for DH Volley.

She is a core member of the Azerbaijan national team, representing the country in 2018 FIVB Women's Volleyball World Championship, as well as 2019, 2021, 2023 and 2026 editions of European Volleyball Championship.

== Clubs ==
- (Azerbaijan) Telekom Baku (2014–2016)
- (Azerbaijan) Absheron VC (2017–2018)
- (Azerbaijan) Azerrail Baku (2018–2019)
- (Azerbaijan) Mubariz SK (2019–2020)
- (Azerbaijan) Absheron VC (2021–2024)
- (Azerbaijan) Azerrail Baku (2024–2025)
- (Azerbaijan) DH Volley (2025–present)
