= 2015–16 Azerbaijan Women's Volleyball Super League =

Season of a volleyball league

2015-2016 Azerbaijan Women's Volleyball Super League
- Sport: Volleyball
- Founded: 2008
- No. of teams: 6
- Country: Azerbaijan
- Continent: (European Union) Europe
- Most recent champion: Rabita Baku
- Website: Azerbaijan Volleyball Federation

The 2015-16 season of the Azerbaijan Women's Volleyball Super League (Azerbaijani: Azərbaycan Volleybol Superliqası) was the annual season of the country's highest volleyball level. The League of Azerbaijan began on November 6 and included the Georgian Tbilisi club and an Azerbaijani Junior team. Azerrail Baku won the championship final series 3-0 matches over Telekom Baku and Lokomotiv Baku won the bronze medal. The American Madison Kingdon from Azerrail Baku became league's Most Valuable Player.

== Teams ==
1. Lokomotiv Baku
2. Azeryol Baku
3. Azerrail Baku
4. Telekom Baku
5. Gençlik
6. Tbilisi

== Program ==
=== Round I ===
Date	Time		Score		Set 1	Set 2	Set 3	Set 4	Set 5	Total
6 Nov	12:00	Tbilisi	0–3	Gençlik	19–25	19–25	15–25			53–75
6 Nov	14:30	Lokomotiv Baku	1–3	Telekom Baku	22–25	25–15	21–25	25–27		93–92
6 Nov	16:30	Azerrail Baku	1–3	Azeryol Baku	25–27	23–25	25–15	22–25		95–92
7 Nov	12:00	Azerrail Baku	3–0	Tbilisi	25–6	25–20	25–7			75–33
8 Nov	12:00	Telekom Baku	3–0	Tbilisi	25–13	25–5	25–15			75–33

Date	Time		Score		Set 1	Set 2	Set 3	Set 4	Set 5	Total
15 Nov	14:00	Telekom Baku	1–3	Azerrail Baku	22–25	25–22	18–25	17–25		82–97
15 Nov	16:00	Lokomotiv Baku	3–1	Azeryol Baku	25–22	25–22	22–25	25–23		97–92
16 Nov	13:00	Azeryol Baku	3–0	Gençlik	25–20	25–18	25–23			75–61

Date	Time		Score		Set 1	Set 2	Set 3	Set 4	Set 5	Total
17 Nov	13:00	Gençlik	0–3	Lokomotiv Baku	16–25	10–25	24–26			50–76
20 Nov	13:00	Azeryol Baku	1–3	Telekom Baku	22–25	21–25	25–21	18–25		86–96
20 Nov	15:00	Azerrail Baku	0–3	Lokomotiv Baku	24–26	16–25	23–25			63–76

Date	Time		Score		Set 1	Set 2	Set 3	Set 4	Set 5	Total
30 Nov	14:00	Telekom Baku	3–2	Lokomotiv Baku	20–25	18–25	25–21	25–16	15–12	103–99
30 Nov	16:00	Azerrail Baku	2–3	Azeryol Baku	19–25	13–25	25–21	25–19	14–16	96–106
1 Dec	13:00	Gençlik	0–3	Lokomotiv Baku	12–25	23–25	13–25			48–75

Date	Time		Score		Set 1	Set 2	Set 3	Set 4	Set 5	Total
2 Dec	13:00	Azerrail Baku	3–0	Gençlik	25–9	25–15	25–6			75–29
4 Dec	13:00	Telekom Baku	3–0	Gençlik	25–17	25–19	25–15			75–51
5 Dec	14:00	Azerrail Baku	3–0	Telekom Baku	25–17	25–18	25–21			75–56
5 Dec	16:00	Azeryol Baku	3–0	Lokomotiv Baku	25–18	25–19	26–24			76–61

Date	Time		Score		Set 1	Set 2	Set 3	Set 4	Set 5	Total
12 Dec	13:00	Azeryol Baku	3–0	Tbilisi	25–20	25–17	25–14			75–51
13 Dec	13:00	Gençlik	3–0	Tbilisi	25–20	25–17	25–14			75–51
14 Dec	14:00	Tbilisi	0–3	Lokomotiv Baku	11–25	16–25	8–25			35–75
15 Dec	16:00	Azerrail Baku	3–0	Gençlik	25–14	25–16	25–12			75–42

Date	Time		Score		Set 1	Set 2	Set 3	Set 4	Set 5	Total
19 Dec	14:00	Telekom Baku	3–1	Azeryol Baku	28–30	25–22	25–20	25–23		103–95
19 Dec	16:00	Lokomotiv Baku	0–3	Azerrail Baku	22–25	13–25	20–25			55–75

Date	Time		Score		Set 1	Set 2	Set 3	Set 4	Set 5	Total
11 Jan	14:00	Telekom Baku	3–0	Gençlik	25–16	25–15	25–12			75–43
12 Jan	13:00	Gençlik	3–2	Azeryol Baku	25–21	25–22	12–25	14–25	15–12	91–105
13 Jan	13:00	Gençlik	0–3	Azerrail Baku	19–25	24–26	10–25			53–76

Date	Time		Score		Set 1	Set 2	Set 3	Set 4	Set 5	Total
21 Jan	13:00	Lokomotiv Baku	3–0	Gençlik	25–18	25–12	25–15			75–45
22 Jan	13:00	Tbilisi	0–3	Telekom Baku	11–25	09–25	17–25			37–75
23 Jan	13:00	Tbilisi	0–3	Lokomotiv Baku	07–25	08–25	14–25			29–75
24 Jan	13:00	Tbilisi	0–3	Azerrail Baku	07–25	08–25	16–25			31–75

Date	Time		Score		Set 1	Set 2	Set 3	Set 4	Set 5	Total
30 Jan	13:00	Gençlik	0–3	Telekom Baku	17–25	02–25	16–25			35–75
02 Feb	14:00	Azerrail Baku	3–2	Azeryol Baku	25–22	21–25	20–25	25-20	15-10	126–102
03 Feb	14:00	Lokomotiv Baku	3–0	Telekom Baku	25–23	25–22	26–24			76–46
06 Feb	13:00	Azeryol Baku	2–3	Telekom Baku	27–25	25–21	14–25	22–25	13–15	101–111

Date	Time		Score		Set 1	Set 2	Set 3	Set 4	Set 5	Total
15 Feb	14:00	Lokomotiv Baku	2–3	Azeryol Baku	16–25	25–23	25–18	21–25	14–16	101–107
15 Feb	16:00	Telekom Baku	3–1	Azerrail Baku	25–23	25–23	19–25	25-23		94–94
17 Feb	14:00	Tbilisi	0–3	Azeryol Baku	11–25	18–25	14–25			43–75
17 Feb	13:00	Azerrail Baku	3–0	Gençlik	25–16	25–18	25–19			75–53

Date	Time		Score		Set 1	Set 2	Set 3	Set 4	Set 5	Total
18 Feb	13:00	Telekom Baku	3–0	Gençlik	25–12	25–9	25–17			75–38
18 Feb	13:00	Lokomotiv Baku	3–0	Tbilisi	25–11	25–20	25–05			75–36
19 Feb	13:00	Telekom Baku	3–0	Tbilisi	25–18	25–15	25–8			75–41
19 Feb	15:00	Azerrail Baku	3–0	Lokomotiv Baku	25–17	25–21	25–20			75–58
20 Feb	13:00	Gençlik	3–1	Tbilisi	25–15	23–25	25–16	25–19		98–75

== 3rd place ==
Date	Time		Score		Set 1	Set 2	Set 3	Set 4	Set 5	Total	Report
5 Apr	13:00	Azeryol Baku	0–3	Lokomotiv Baku	16-25	20-25	23-25			59–0	
7 Apr	13:00	Azeryol Baku	2–3	Lokomotiv Baku	16-25	25-21	20-25	25-23	11-15	97–0	
9 Apr	13:00	Azeryol Baku	0–3	Lokomotiv Baku	17-25	21-25	16-25			54–0	

== Final ==
Date	Time		Score		Set 1	Set 2	Set 3	Set 4	Set 5	Total	Report
5 Apr	15:00	Telekom Baku	1–3	Azerrail Baku	25-23	29-31	20-25	20-25		94–0	
7 Apr	15:00	Telekom Baku	2–3	Azerrail Baku	16-25	25-23	23-25	25-22	13-15	102–0	
9 Apr	15:00	Telekom Baku	1–3	Azerrail Baku	22-25	23-25	17-25			62–0	

== Awards ==
- MVP: (United States) Madison Kingdon (Azerrail Baku)
- MVP of Final : (Azerbaijan) Odina Bayramova (Azerrail Baku)
- Best scorer : (Czech Republic) Aneta Havlíčková (Lokomotiv Baku)
- Best Outside Hitter : (Azerbaijan) Yelyzaveta Samadova (Telekom Baku)
- Best Outside Hitter : (United States) Stephanie Niemer (Azeryol Baku)
- Best blocker : (United States) Jessica Susan Tow-Arnett (Azerrail Baku)
- Best setter : (Thailand) Nootsara Tomkom (Azerrail Baku)
- Best receiver : (Azerbaijan) Odina Bayramova (Azerrail Baku)
- Best digger : (Dominican Republic) Brenda Castillo (Lokomotiv Baku)
- Best libero : (Azerbaijan) Valeriya Mammadova (Azerrail Baku)
- Best server : (Thailand) Malika Kanthong (Azeryol Baku)
