= Yelena Parkhomenko =

Azerbaijani volleyball player (born 1982)

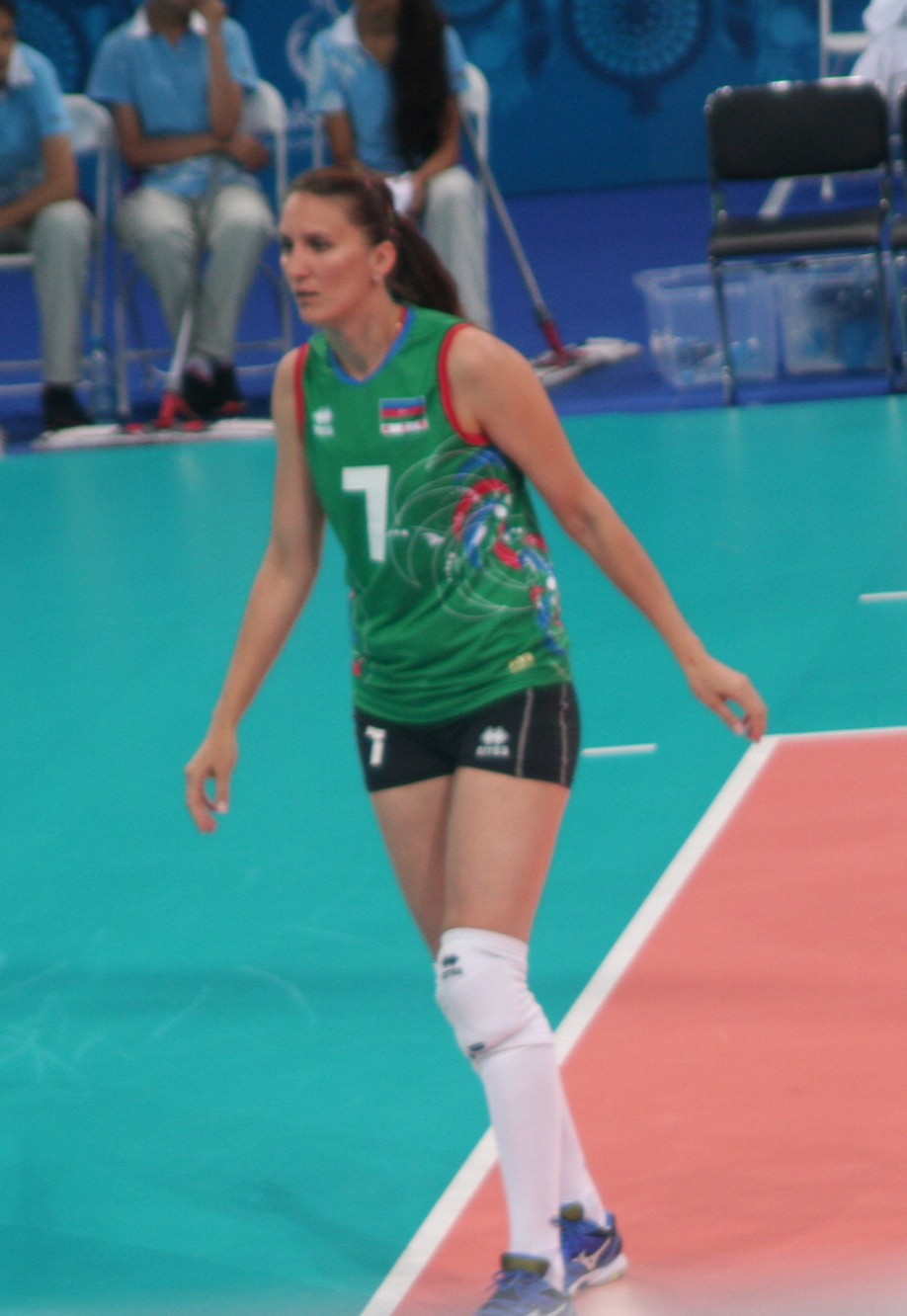

Personal information
- Born: September 11, 1982 (age 44) Baku, Azerbaijan SSR
- Home town: Baku, Azerbaijan
- Height: 1.86 m (6 ft 1 in)
- Weight: 68 kg (150 lb)
- Spike: 300 cm (120 in)
- Block: 293 cm (115 in)

Volleyball information
- Position: Wing-Spiker
- Current team: Retired
- Number: 7

Career
- Years: Team
- 1999–2000 2000-2001 2001–2007 2007 2007–2009 2009-2012 2012–2013 2013-2014 2015–2015 2015-2016: (Azerbaijan) Neftyag Baku (Azerbaijan) Lokomotiv Baku (Azerbaijan) Azerrail Baku (Italy) Volley Club Padova (Azerbaijan) Azerrail Baku (Azerbaijan) Lokomotiv Baku (Azerbaijan) Azerylo VK (Azerbaijan) Azerrail Baku (Thailand) Ayutthaya ATTCC (Azerbaijan) Azeryol VK

National team
- Years: Team
- 2003–2016: Azerbaijan

Yelena Parkhomenko (Azerbaijani: Yelena Parxomenko; born 11 September 1982) is a volleyball player from Azerbaijan. Parkhomenko has represented the Azerbaijan Volleyball national team at the Volleyball Women's World Cup in 2006 and 2014, in total she played 142 games at an international level. At a club level she has played for numerous teams in Azerbaijan, as well as in Italy, Thailand and Israel. She retired in 2016.

Her sister Oksana Kurt is also an international volleyball player.

== Honours ==
Azerbaijan Superleague: 2000/01; 2002/03; 2003/04; 2004/05

CEV Cup: 2001/02

Challenge Cup: 2011/12
