= Manon Nummerdor-Flier =

Dutch volleyball player

Manon Flier
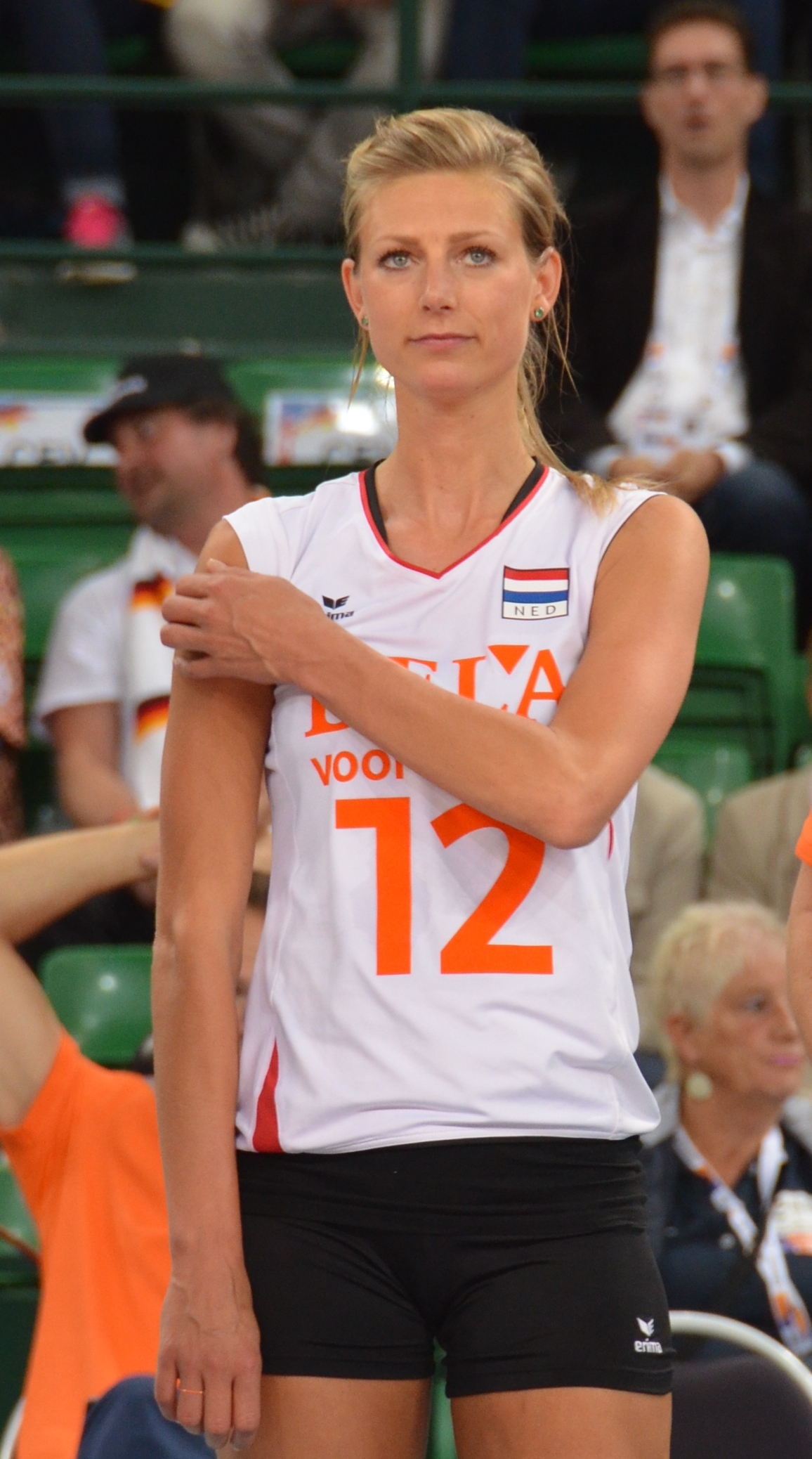
- Flier in 2013

Personal information
- Full name: Manon Nummerdor-Flier
- Nationality: Netherlands
- Born: 8 February 1984 (age 42); Nieuwleusen, Netherlands
- Hometown: Uithoorn, Netherlands
- Height: 1.92 m (6 ft 4 in)
- Weight: 73 kg (161 lb)
- Spike: 315 cm (124 in)
- Block: 308 cm (121 in)

Volleyball information
- Position: Opposite spiker

Career
Years	Teams
1999–2001; 2001–2002; 2002–2004; 2004–2005; 2005–2008; 2008–2009; 2009–2010; 2010–2011; 2011–2012; 2012–2013; 2013; 2014–2015	(Netherlands) Volco Ommen (Netherlands) Pollux Oldenzaal (Netherlands) VC Weert (Italy) Sant'Orsola Asystel Novara (Netherlands) Dela Martinus Amstelveen (Italy) Monte Schiavo Jesi (Italy) Asystel Volley Novara (Italy) Scavolini Pesaro (Japan) Toray Arrows (Azerbaijan) Azerrail Baku (Azerbaijan) Igtisadchi Baku (China) Fujian Xi Meng Bao

National team
2001 – 2015	Netherlands
Medal record
Women's volleyball
Representing the Netherlands
FIVB World Grand Prix
Gold medal – first place	2007 Ningbo	Team
European Championship
Silver medal – second place	2009 Poland	Team
Silver medal – second place	2015 Belgium / Netherlands	Team
- Last updated: August 2016

Manon Nummerdor-Flier (born 8 February 1984) is a retired Dutch volleyball player who played as an opposite.

== Career ==
Flier was named Most Valuable Player at the 2007 FIVB World Grand Prix in Ningbo, PR China, where the Dutch national team won the gold medal.

Flier lost the bronze medal at the 2010–11 CEV Champions League after her team Scavolini Pesaro was defeated 3–1 by the Turkish Fenerbahçe Acıbadem. She was individually awarded "Best Spiker".

In July 2011, Toray Arrows announced that she was joining for the 2011–12 season.

Flier won the bronze medal with Igtisadchi Baku in the 2013–14 Azerbaijan Super League and the Best Server award.

In 2015, she played with the Dutch national team at the 2015 European Games in Baku, Azerbaijan. Flier started her volleyball career at Flash Nieuwleusen in 1992 and is the most experienced player of the current team with 406 international matches.

== Personal life ==
Flier is married to the Dutch beach volleyball player Reinder Nummerdor. They have been a couple since 2005 and have lived together in Zwolle since 2012. They married on 14 June 2014, and their daughter was born in July 2016. Their second child, a son, was born in 2019.

== Clubs ==
- (Netherlands) Volco Ommen (1999–2001)
- (Netherlands) Pollux Oldenzaal (2001–2002)
- (Netherlands) VC Weert (2002–2004)
- (Italy) Sant'Orsola Asystel Novara (2004–2005)
- (Netherlands) Dela Martinus Amstelveen (2005–2008)
- (Italy) Monte Schiavo Banca Marche Jesi (2008–2009)
- (Italy) Asystel Volley Novara (2009–2010)
- (Italy) Scavolini Pesaro (2010–2011)
- (Japan) Toray Arrows (2011–2012)
- (Azerbaijan) Azerrail Baku (2012–2013)
- (Azerbaijan) Igtisadchi Baku (2013–2014)
- (China) Fujian Xi Meng Bao (2014–2015)

== Awards ==
=== Individuals ===
- 2007 FIVB World Grand Prix "Most Valuable Player"
- 2009 FIVB World Grand Prix "Best Scorer"
- 2009 FIVB World Grand Prix "Best Server"
- 2009 European Championships "Most Valuable Player"
- 2010–11 CEV Champions League Final Four "Best Spiker"
- 2013-14 Azerbaijan Super League "Best Server"

=== Clubs ===
- 2002 Netherlands League Championship – Champion, with Pollux Oldenzaal
- 2002 Netherlands Cup – Champion, with Pollux Oldenzaal
- 2005 Italian Supercup – Champion, with Sant'Orsola Asystel Novara
- 2006 Netherlands League Championship – Champion, with Dela Martinus Amstelveen
- 2006 Netherlands Cup – Champion, with Dela Martinus Amstelveen
- 2007 Netherlands Cup – Champion, with Dela Martinus Amstelveen
- 2007 Netherlands League Championship – Champion, with Dela Martinus Amstelveen
- 2008 Netherlands League Championship – Champion, with Dela Martinus Amstelveen
- 2008 Netherlands Cup – Champion, with Dela Martinus Amstelveen
- 2009 Challenge Cup – Champion, with Monte Schiavo Banca Marche Jesi
- 2013-14 Azerbaijan Super League – 3rd place, with Igtisadchi Baku

Awards
Preceded by (Brazil) Sheilla Castro	Most Valuable Player of FIVB World Grand Prix; 2007	Succeeded by (Brazil) Marianne Steinbrecher
Preceded by (Japan) Saori Kimura	Best Server of FIVB World Grand Prix; 2009	Succeeded by (China) Wang Yimei
Preceded by (Italy) Taismary Agüero	Most Valuable Player of European Championship; 2009	Succeeded by (Serbia) Jovana Brakočević
