= Oksana Kurt =

Azerbaijani volleyball player (born 1984)

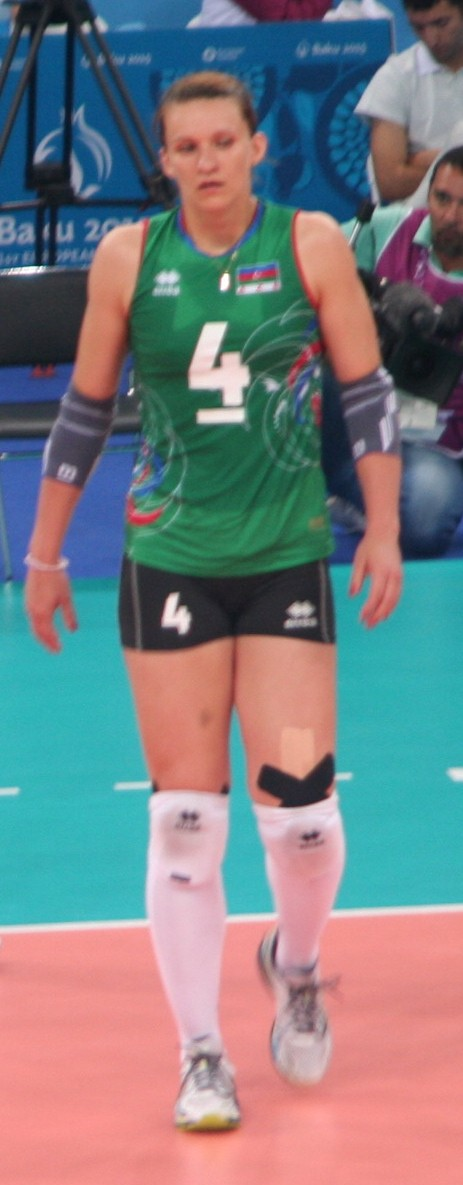

Personal information
- Full name: Oksana Kurt Parkhomenko
- Born: July 28, 1984 (age 42); Baku, Azerbaijan SSR
- Hometown: Baku, Azerbaijan
- Height: 1.84 m (6 ft 0 in)
- Weight: 77 kg (170 lb)
- Spike: 300 cm (120 in)
- Block: 290 cm (110 in)

Volleyball information
- Position: Setter

Career
Years	Teams
1999–2000; 2000-2001; 2001–2007; 2007; 2007–2008; 2008-2009; 2009–2011; 2011-2014; 2014–2015	(Azerbaijan) Neftyag Baku (Turkey) Yeşilyurt (Azerbaijan) Azerrail Baku (Switzerland) Voléro Zürich (Azerbaijan) Azerrail Baku (Turkey) Fenerbahçe (Russia) Dynamo Moscow (Azerbaijan) Azeryol Baku (Azerbaijan) Azerrail Baku

National team
1998–2015	Azerbaijan

Oksana Kurt, also known as Oksana Parkhomenko, (born 28 July 1984 in Baku, Azerbaijan SSR); is a retired Azerbaijani indoor volleyball player, recognized as one of the most successful volleyball players in her country. Kurt is the most capped player in the history of Azerbaijan women's national team and was the team captain from 2006 until 2015. She retired from volleyball in 2015 and works as a volleyball manager.

== Clubs ==
- (Azerbaijan) Nagliyatchi VC (1999–2000)
- (Turkey) Yeşilyurt Istanbul (2000–2001)
- (Azerbaijan) Azerrail Baku (2001–2007)
- (Switzerland) Volero Zurich (2007–2007)
- (Azerbaijan) Azerrail Baku (2007–2008)
- (Turkey) Fenerbahçe Istanbul (2008–2009)
- (Russia) WVC Dynamo Moscow (2009–2011)
- (Azerbaijan) Azeryol Baku (2011–2014)
- (Azerbaijan) Azerrail Baku (2013–2015)

== Awards ==
=== Individual ===
- 2006 World Championship qualification "Best Setter and Best Server"
- 2010 World Championship qualification "Best Blocker"
- 2008-09 Turkish Women's Volleyball League "Best Setter"
- 2009-10 Russian Cup "Best Setter"

=== Club ===
- 2001-02 CEV Cup - Champion, with Azerrail Baku
- 2002–03 Azerbaijan Women's Volleyball Super League - Champion, with Azerrail Baku
- 2003–04 Azerbaijan Women's Volleyball Super League - Champion, with Azerrail Baku
- 2004–05 Azerbaijan Women's Volleyball Super League - Champion, with Azerrail Baku
- 2005–06 Azerbaijan Women's Volleyball Super League - Champion, with Azerrail Baku
- 2007 Swiss Women's Volleyball League - Champion, with Voléro Zürich
- 2008-09 Turkish Women's Volleyball League - Champion, with Fenerbahçe Acıbadem
- 2008–09 Women's CEV Cup - Bronze medal, with Fenerbahçe Acıbadem
- 2009-10 Russian Superleague - Runner-Up, with Dynamo Moscow
- 2009-10 Russian Cup - Champion, with Dynamo Moscow
- 2013–14 Azerbaijan Women's Volleyball Super League - Runner-Up, with Azeryol Baku
- 2014–15 Azerbaijan Superleague - Bronze medal, with Azeryol Baku

== See also ==
- Azeryol Baku
- Azerbaijan women's national volleyball team
