= Aynur Imanova =

Azerbaijani volleyball player

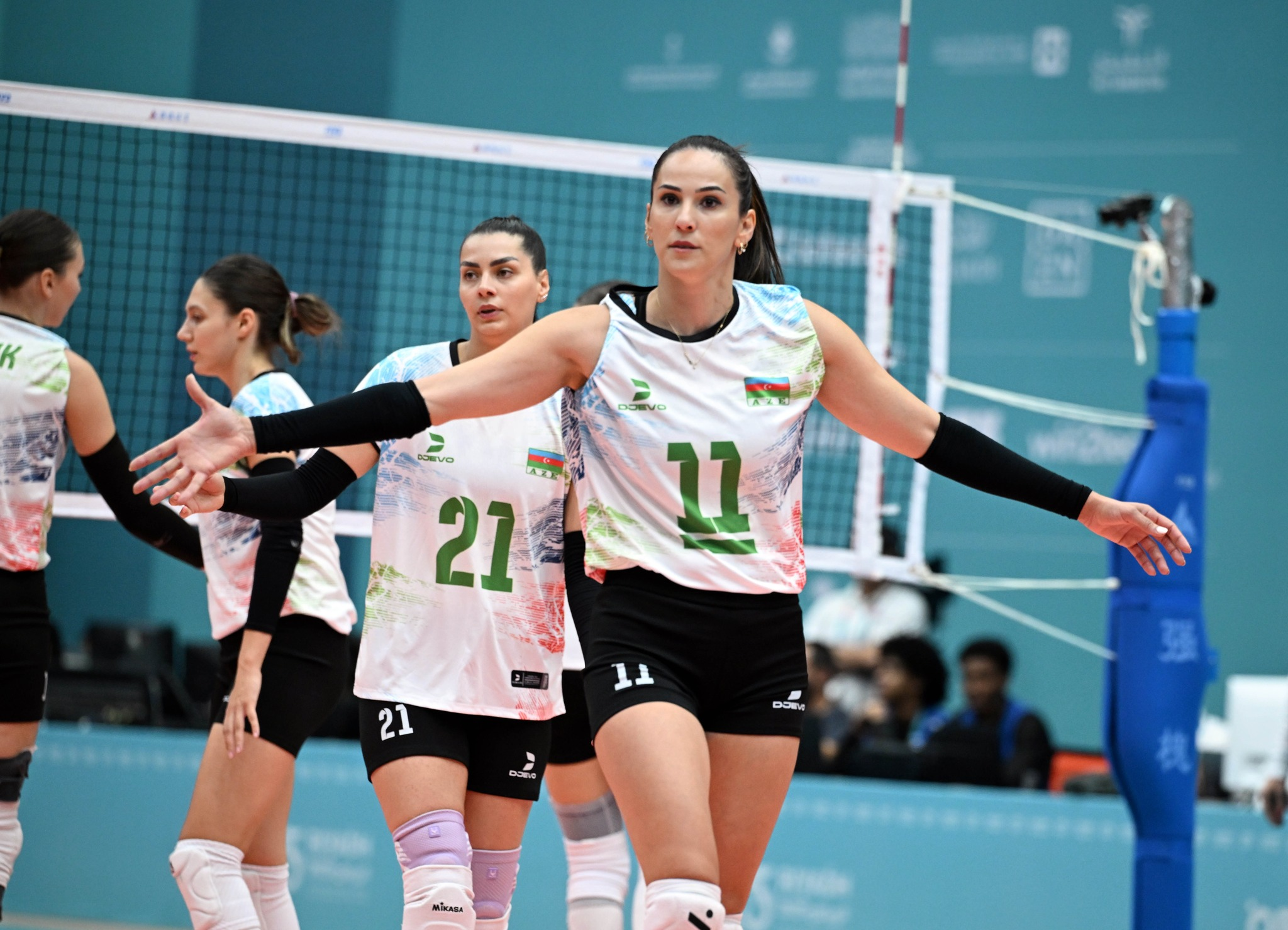

Personal information
- Nationality: Azerbaijan
- Born: 7 December 1988 (age 37); Baku, Azerbaijan
- Height: 1.89 m (6 ft 2 in)
- Weight: 66 kg (146 lb)
- Spike: 290 cm (110 in)
- Block: 280 cm (110 in)

Volleyball information
- Position: Middle-blocker
- Number: 11

Career
| Years | Teams |
|---|---|
| 2022–present | (Azerbaijan) Azerrail Baku |

National team
| 2006 – present | Azerbaijan |
Honours
Women's volleyball
Representing Azerbaijan
European League
| Gold medal – first place | 2016 Nitra | Team |
Islamic Solidarity Games
| Gold medal – first place | 2017 Baku | Team |
| Bronze medal – third place | 2021 Konya | Team |
- Last updated: 16 August 2022

Aynur Imanova (née Kerimova; Azerbaijani: Aynur Imanova; born 7 December 1988) is an Azerbaijani female volleyball player who currently plays for and captains Azerrail Baku in Azerbaijan Superleague.

Imanova has played for Azerbaijan women's national volleyball team since 2006 and has been part of the squad at the 2006 and 2018 FIVB World Championships, as well as 6 editions of the European Championship (2007, 2009, 2011, 2013, 2015, 2017).

== Clubs ==
- (Azerbaijan) Azerrail Baku (2006–2012)
- (Azerbaijan) Azeryol Baku (2012–2014)
- (Azerbaijan) Azerrail Baku (2014–2015)
- (Azerbaijan) Azeryol Baku (2015–2016)
- (Azerbaijan) Azerrail Baku (2016–2018)
- (Azerbaijan) Absheron VC (2021–2022)
- (Azerbaijan) Azerrail Baku (2022–present)
