= Tabitha Love =

Canadian volleyball player (born 1991)

Tabi Love
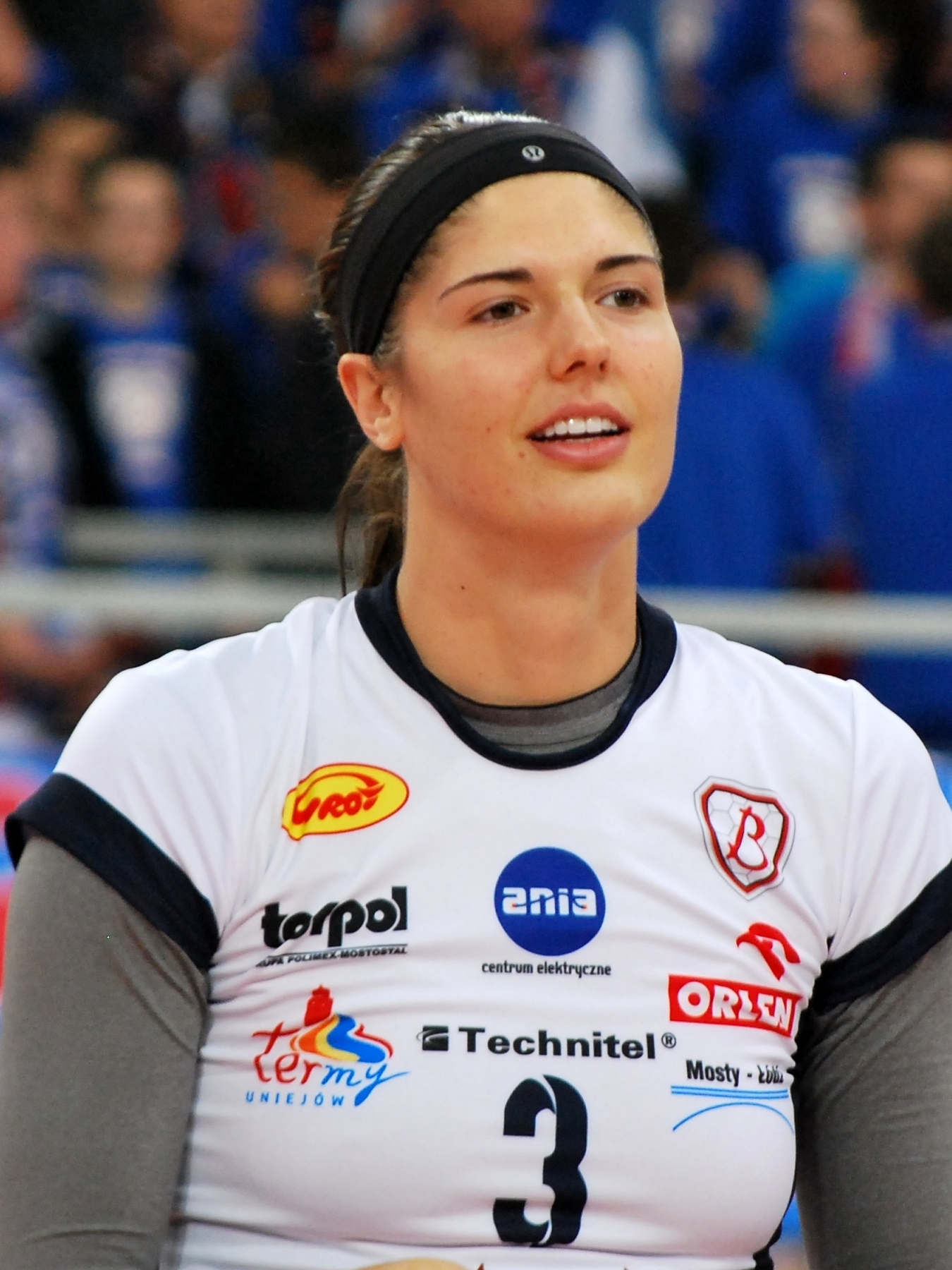
- Tabi Love in 2013

Personal information
- Full name: Tabitha Love
- Nickname: Tabi
- Nationality: Canada
- Born: 11 September 1991 (age 35); Brandon, Manitoba
- Hometown: Dauphin, Manitoba
- Height: 1.96 m (6 ft 5 in)
- Spike: 323 cm (127 in)
- Block: 307 cm (121 in)
- Education: UCLA

Volleyball information
- Position: Left Side/Opposite
- Current club: ASPTT Mulhouse
- Number: 9

Career
Years	Teams
2016–2017; 2017–	Incheon Heungkuk Life; ASPTT Mulhouse

National team
2013 – present	Canada

Tabi Love (born 11 September 1991) is a Canadian volleyball player. She is a current member of the Canada women's national volleyball team. Love has been playing professionally since graduating from University of California, Los Angeles in December 2012. She has played for Criollas de Caguas, Budowlani Łódź, Azeryol Baku and Schweriner SC. She is currently playing in France for the ASPTT Mulhouse.

Love has been involved with the Canadian Women's Volleyball program since she first joined their youth team in 2005. Her first international debut with the Senior A team was in the summer of 2013. Since then she has competed at many events, most notably at the 2014 FIVB Volleyball Women's World Championship in Italy as well as the 2015 Pan American Games in Toronto.

Back in her college days at UCLA, Love earned First Team All-America honors and was an integral part of the 2011 Bruins squad that won the NCAA Division I Women's Volleyball Championship.

== Clubs ==
- (Puerto Rico) Criollas de Caguas (2013)
- (Poland) Budowlani Łódź (2013–2014)
- (Azerbaijan) Azeryol Baku (2014–2015)
- (Germany) Schweriner SC (2015–2016)
- (South Korea) Incheon Heungkuk Life Pink Spiders (2016–2017)
- (France) ASPTT Mulhouse (2017 – present)
