= Azeryol Baku =

Azerbaijani women's volleyball club

Azeryol Baku VC
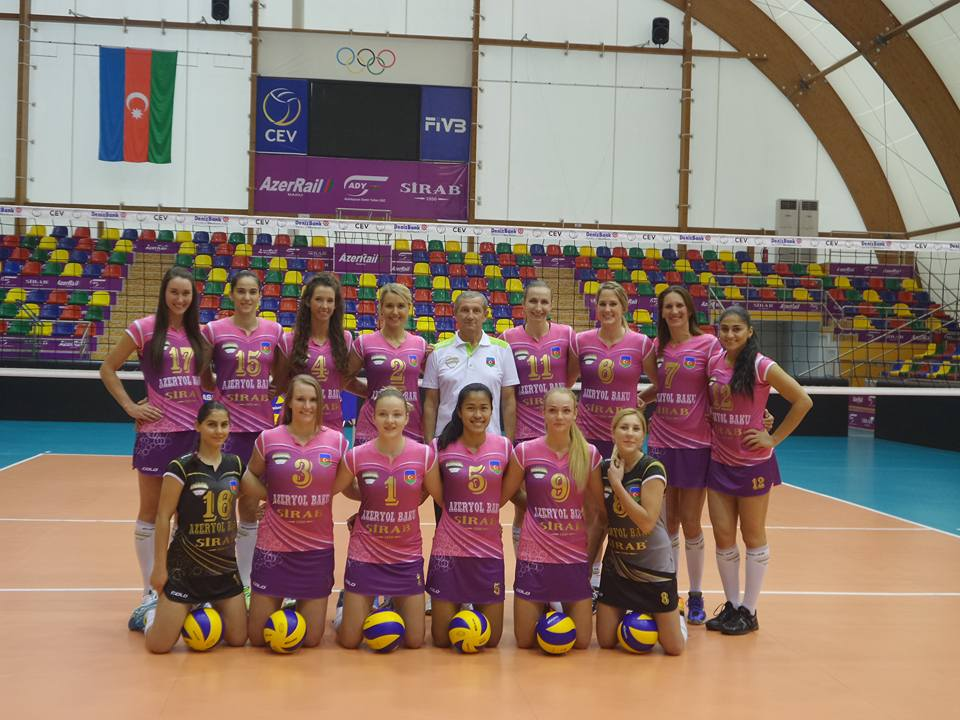
- Full name: Azeryol Baku
- Founded: 2012; 14 years ago
- Dissolved: 2017; 9 years ago
- League: Azerbaijan Superleague
- 2016/2017: 3rd

Azeryol Baku is an Azerbaijani women's volleyball club.

== History ==
Azeryol Baku is an Azerbaijani women's volleyball club and immediately got the right to participate in the 2012-2013 Azerbaijan Women's Volleyball Super League.

== Team ==
=== As Azeryol Baku ===
Season 2015–2016, as of December 2015.

| Number | Player | Position | Height (m) | Weight (kg) | Birth date |
|---|---|---|---|---|---|
| 2 | (Germany) Mareen Apitz (c) | Setter | 1.83 | 72 | 26 March 1987 (age 38) |
| 3 | (United States) Lauren Whyte | Outside hitter | 1.83 | 78 | 10 February 1991 (age 35) |
| 4 | (United States) Stephanie Niemer | Outside hitter | 1.88 | 70 | 3 September 1989 (age 36) |
| 5 | (Thailand) Malika Kanthong | Opposite | 1.78 | 73 | 8 January 1987 (age 39) |
| 7 | (Azerbaijan) Yelena Parkhomenko | Middle blocker | 1.87 | 77 | 11 September 1982 (age 43) |
| 8 | (Azerbaijan) Anita Bredis | Setter | 1.79 | 68 | 27 January 1992 (age 34) |
| 9 | (Ukraine) Anna Stepaniuk | Outside hitter | 1.80 | 70 | 31 October 1992 (age 33) |
| 10 | (Azerbaijan) Iuliia Karimova | Libero | 1.75 | 68 | 7 February 1988 (age 38) |
| 10 | (Poland) Kinga Kasprzak | Outside hitter | 1.90 | 78 | 12 June 1987 (age 38) |
| 11 | (Azerbaijan) Katerina Zhidkova | Opposite | 1.88 | 77 | 28 September 1989 (age 36) |
| 12 | (Azerbaijan) Shafagat Habibova | Setter | 1.80 | 72 | 3 August 1991 (age 34) |
| 14 | (Hungary) Edina Dobi | Middle blocker | 1.92 | 80 | 22 October 1987 (age 38) |
| 15 | (Azerbaijan) Aynur Karimova | Middle blocker | 1.90 | 70 | 7 December 1988 (age 37) |
| 16 | (Azerbaijan) Jeyran Aliyeva | Libero | 1.65 | 57 | 3 February 1995 (age 31) |
| 17 | (United States) Janelle Sykes | Middle blocker | 1.91 | 80 | 14 October 1993 (age 32) |

2014–2015 Team
| Number | Player | Position | Height (m) | Weight (kg) | Birth date |
|---|---|---|---|---|---|
| 1 | (Germany) Lenka Dürr | Libero | 1.71 | 59 | 10 December 1990 (age 35) |
| 2 | (Azerbaijan) Kseniya Poznyak | Middle-blocker | 1.90 | 78 | 21 November 1986 (age 39) |
| 3 | (Azerbaijan) Anastasiya Gurbanova | Opposite | 1.90 | 80 | 4 December 1989 (age 36) |
| 4 | (Azerbaijan) Oksana Kurt | Setter | 1.84 | 77 | 28 July 1984 (age 41) |
| 5 | (Azerbaijan) Odina Bayramova | Outside-spiker | 1.86 | 88 | 25 May 1990 (age 35) |
| 6 | (Serbia) Jovana Brakočević | Opposite | 1.96 | 82 | 5 March 1988 (age 38) |
| 7 | (Bulgaria) Lora Kitipova | Setter | 1.84 | 66 | 19 May 1991 (age 34) |
| 9 | (Brazil) Andressa Picussa | Middle-blocker | 1.94 | 87 | 22 July 1989 (age 36) |
| 10 | (Azerbaijan) Anastasiia Muzyka | Setter | 1.85 | 68 | 15 October 1997 (age 28) |
| 11 | (Canada) Tabitha Love | Opposite | 1.96 | 85 | 11 September 1991 (age 34) |
| 12 | (Serbia) Jelena Nikolić | Outside-spiker | 1.94 | 79 | 13 April 1982 (age 43) |
| 14 | (Azerbaijan) Katerina Zhidkova | Outside-spiker | 1.86 | 70 | 28 September 1989 (age 36) |
| 16 | (Azerbaijan) Jeyran Aliyeva | Libero | 1.65 | 51 | 3 February 1995 (age 31) |
| 17 | (Bulgaria) Strashimira Filipova | Middle blocker | 1.95 | 78 | 18 August 1985 (age 40) |

2013–2014 Team
| Number | Player | Position | Height (m) | Weight (kg) | Birth date |
|---|---|---|---|---|---|
| 1 | (Dominican Republic) Annerys Vargas | Middle-blocker | 1.96 | 70 | 7 August 1981 (age 44) |
| 2 | (Azerbaijan) Kseniya Poznyak | Middle-blocker | 1.90 | 78 | 21 November 1986 (age 39) |
| 3 | (Brazil) Fernanda Isis | Middle-blocker | 1.83 | 72 | 15 July 1984 (age 41) |
| 4 | (Azerbaijan) Oksana Kurt | Setter | 1.84 | 77 | 28 July 1984 (age 41) |
| 5 | (Azerbaijan) Odina Bayramova | Outside-spiker | 1.86 | 88 | 25 May 1990 (age 35) |
| 6 | (Germany) Lisa Thomsen | Libero | 1.72 | 68 | 20 August 1985 (age 40) |
| 8 | (Azerbaijan) Natavan Gasimova | Setter | 1.78 | 61 | 8 July 1985 (age 40) |
| 9 | (Italy) Chiara Di Iulio | Outside-spiker | 1.85 | 69 | 5 May 1985 (age 40) |
| 10 | (Azerbaijan) Jana Matiašovská-Aghayeva | Outside-spiker | 1.98 | 84 | 7 July 1987 (age 38) |
| 11 | (United States) Jessica Tow-Arnett | Middle-blocker | 1.87 | 70 | 15 November 1986 (age 39) |
| 12 | (Azerbaijan) Valeriya Mammadova | Libero | 1.74 | 65 | 29 January 1984 (age 42) |
| 14 | (Germany) Margareta Kozuch | Opposite | 1.87 | 70 | 30 October 1986 (age 39) |
| 15 | (Cuba) Yusidey Silié (c) | Setter | 1.84 | 77 | 11 November 1984 (age 41) |
| 16 | (Japan) Akiko Ino | Libero | 1.68 | 59 | 28 September 1986 (age 39) |
| 16 | (Azerbaijan) Jeyran Aliyeva | Libero | 1.65 | 51 | 3 February 1995 (age 31) |
| 17 | (Azerbaijan) Polina Rahimova | Opposite | 1.98 | 87 | 5 June 1990 (age 35) |

=== As Baki-Azeryol Baku ===
2012–2013 Team
| Number | Player | Position | Height (m) | Weight (kg) | Birth date |
|---|---|---|---|---|---|
| 1 | (Azerbaijan) Darya Zamanova | Opposite | 1.94 | 78 | 30 April 1987 (age 38) |
| 2 | (Czech Republic) Vendula Adlerová | Opposite | 1.92 | 72 | 24 April 1984 (age 41) |
| 3 | (Azerbaijan) Anastasiya Gurbanova | Opposite | 1.88 | 73 | 4 December 1989 (age 36) |
| 4 | (Cuba) Yusidey Silié | Setter | 1.84 | 77 | 11 November 1984 (age 41) |
| 5 | (Azerbaijan) Odina Bayramova | Outside-spiker | 1.86 | 88 | 25 May 1990 (age 35) |
| 6 | (Japan) Hiroko Matsuura | Setter | 1.80 | 72 | 15 July 1990 (age 35) |
| 7 | (Azerbaijan) Yelena Parkhomenko | Middle-blocker | 1.86 | 68 | 9 November 1982 (age 43) |
| 8 | (Azerbaijan) Natavan Gasimova | Setter | 1.78 | 61 | 8 July 1985 (age 40) |
| 9 | (United States) Jennifer Joines (c) | Middle-blocker | 1.91 | 77 | 23 November 1982 (age 43) |
| 10 | (Japan) Akiko Ino | Libero | 1.68 | 59 | 28 September 1986 (age 39) |
| 11 | (Russia) Olga Ergardt | Outside-spiker | 1.95 | 75 | 4 March 1987 (age 39) |
| 14 | (Azerbaijan) Kseniya Pavlenko | Outside-spiker | 1.84 | 72 | 30 August 1993 (age 32) |
| 15 | (Azerbaijan) Aynur Karimova | Middle blocker | 1.86 | 71 | 7 December 1988 (age 37) |
| 16 | (Azerbaijan) Oksana Kiselyova | Libero | 1.76 | 64 | 30 May 1992 (age 33) |
| 16 | (United States) Gwendolyn Rucker | Middle blocker | 1.88 | 76 | 28 April 1990 (age 35) |

== Honours ==
- Azerbaijan Superleague:
  - Runners-up (1): 2013–14
  - Third (1): 2014–15, 2016–17
