= Azerbaijan Volleyball League =

Male Volleyball Competition in Azerbaijan

Azerbaijan Men's Volleyball League Azərbaycan Voleybol Erkekler 1.Ligi
- Current season, competition or edition: 2023–24 Azerbaijan Volleyball League
- Sport: Volleyball
- Founded: 1992
- No. of teams: 12
- Country: Azerbaijan
- Confederation: CEV
- Most recent champion: Azerrail Baku (2023–24)
- Level on pyramid: 1
- Relegation to: Men's Second League
- International cups: CEV Champions League; CEV Challenge Cup
- Website: www.voleybol.az

The Azerbaijan Men's Volleyball League (Azerbaijani: Azərbaycan kişilər Voleybol Liqası), is the highest professional men's volleyball league in Azerbaijan. It is run by the Azerbaijan Volleyball Federation. It is considered one of the top national leagues in European volleyball, as its clubs have made significant success in European competitions.

== Champions ==
- 2001–02 Azerneft
- 2002–03 Azerneft
- 2003–04 Azerneft
- 2004–05 Azerneft
- 2005–06 Azerneft
- 2006–07 Azerneft
- 2007–08 Azerneft
- 2008–09 Neftçi Baku
- 2009–10 Neftçi Baku
- 2010–11 Neftçi Baku
- 2011–12 Neftçi Baku
- 2012–13 Neftçi Baku
- 2013–14 Neftçi Baku
- 2014–15 Neftçi Baku
- 2015–16 Neftçi Baku
- 2017–18 Lokomotiv Baku
- 2018–19 Lokomotiv Baku
- 2019–20 Cancelled
- 2020–21 Cancelled
- 2021–22 Murov Baku
- 2022–23 Murov Baku
- 2023–24 Azerrail Baku
- 2024–25 Azerrail Baku
- 2025–26 FHN-Xilasedici VK

== See also ==
- Azerbaijan Women's Volleyball Super League
- Azerbaijan Volleyball Federation
