= Stephanie Niemer =

American volleyball player

Personal information
- Nationality: American
- Born: September 3, 1989 (age 37)
- Hometown: Erlanger, Kentucky, U.S.
- Height: 6 ft 1 in (185 cm)
- Weight: 150 lb (68 kg)
- Education: (United States) University of Cincinnati

Volleyball information
- Position: Wing Spiker
- Current club: -

Career
| Years | Teams |
|---|---|
| 2011–2013 | (Puerto Rico) Indias de Mayagüez |
| 2013 | (Puerto Rico) Orientales de Humacao |
| 2014 | (Puerto Rico) Gigantes de Carolina |
| 2014–2015 | (France) ASPTT Mulhouse |
| 2015–2016 | (Azerbaijan) Azeryol Baku |
| 2016 | (Puerto Rico) Gigantes de Carolina |
| 2016 | (Philippines) Petron Tri-Activ Spikers |
| 2016 | (Philippines) PSL-F2 Logistics Manila |
| 2016–2017 | (Puerto Rico) Criollas de Caguas |
| 2017–2018 | (Greece) Olympiacos Piraeus |
| 2019 | (Philippines) Petron Blaze Spikers |
| 2020-21 | (Puerto Rico) Valencianas de Juncos |

Stephanie Niemer (born September 3, 1989) is a female American volleyballer, playing as an Outside Hitter.

== Career ==
After three years in Puerto Rico, Stefani Niemer in 2014 traveled for first time in Europe, signing in French ASPTT Mulhouse. In 2015–16 season she played for Azeryol Baku and she was voted 2015–16 Azerbaijan Volleyball Super League "Best outside hitter". In 2016 she was selected to the Philippine Super Liga All-Stars team who competed at the 2016 FIVB Volleyball Women's Club World Championship.

In the summer of 2017 Stephanie Niemer traveled for a second time in Europe, signing with Greek powerhouse Olympiacos Piraeus, who were competing in the Hellenic Women's Volleyball League and the CEV Women's Challenge Cup. In Greece, Niemer stood out for her highly efficient service. During a league game against A.O. Markopoulo, she achieved the unbelievable record of 17 serving points.

In 2017–18 season she won with the Piraeus club the CEV Women's Challenge Cup, being the 3rd top scorer with 137 points and the 3rd best server with 19 aces in the whole competition. She also won during the same season the Hellenic championship and the Hellenic cup as well, competing with the best way in the historical Continental Treble of Olympiacos Piraeus that period. In the summer of 2018 she decided to leave Europe and return home for family reasons.

== Sporting achievements ==
=== Clubs ===
==== International competitions ====
- 2018 CEV Women's Challenge Cup, with Olympiacos Piraeus

==== National championships ====
- 2015/2016 Philippine Super Liga Grand Prix - Runner-up with Petron Tri-Activ Spikers
- 2016/2017 Puerto Rico Volleyball League - Champion with Criollas de Caguas
- 2017/2018 Hellenic Championship, with Olympiacos Piraeus
- 2018/2019 Philippine Super Liga Grand Prix - Champion with Petron Tri-Activ Spikers
- 2018/2019 Philippine Super Liga Grand Prix - Champion with Petron Tri-Activ Spikers
- 2018/2019 Philippine Invitational Conference Runner-up with Petron Tri-Activ Spikers

==== National trophies ====
- 2017/2018 Hellenic Cup, with Olympiacos Piraeus

=== Individual ===
==== St. Henry's High School ====
- District Tournament MVP
- Most Outstanding Player (Kentucky)

==== University of Cincinnati ====
- 2007 Freshman of the Year
- 2007 Second Team All-Conference Selection
- 2008 First Team All-Conference Selection
- 2009 AVCA Honorable-mention All-American
- 2009 AVCA First Team Northeast Region Selection
- 2010 Big East Player of the Year

==== Azeryol Baku ====
- 2015–16 Azerbaijan Volleyball Super League "Best outside hitter"

==== Petron Tri-Activ Spikers ====
- 2016 Philippine Super Liga Grand Prix "1st Best Outside Spiker"
- 2019 Philippine Super Liga Grand Prix "Best scorer"
- 2019 Philippine Super Liga Grand Prix "Most valuable player"
