= Hiroko Matsuura =

Japanese volleyball player

Personal information
- Full name: Hiroko Matsuura
- Nickname: Hiro
- Born: July 15, 1990 (age 36); Kumamoto City, Kumamoto, Japan
- Hometown: Tokyo, Japan
- Height: 1.80 m (5 ft 11 in)
- Weight: 72 kg (159 lb)
- Spike: 296 cm (117 in)

Volleyball information
- Position: Setter / Wing Spiker
- Current club: Baki-Azeryol

Hiroko Matsuura (松浦 寛子 Matsuura Hiroko, born July 15, 1990) is a Japanese volleyball player who plays for Baki-Azeryol.

== Clubs ==
- Kumamoto Municipal Nagamine Junior High → Higashikyushu Ryukoku High School (2006–2009) → NEC Red Rockets (2009-2012) → Baki-Azeryol (2012-)

== National team ==
- Japan Youth national team (2007)
- Japan Junior national team (2008)

== Honours ==
=== Individuals ===
- 2007: World Youth Volleyball championship - Spike award

=== Team ===
- 2011 60th Kurowashiki All Japan Volleyball Tournament - Runner-up, with NEC Red Rockets.

=== National team ===
==== Junior team ====
- 2008: Champion in the 14th Asian Junior Volleyball Championship
