= Valeriya Mammadova =

Azerbaijani volleyball player (born 1984)

Valeriya Korotenko
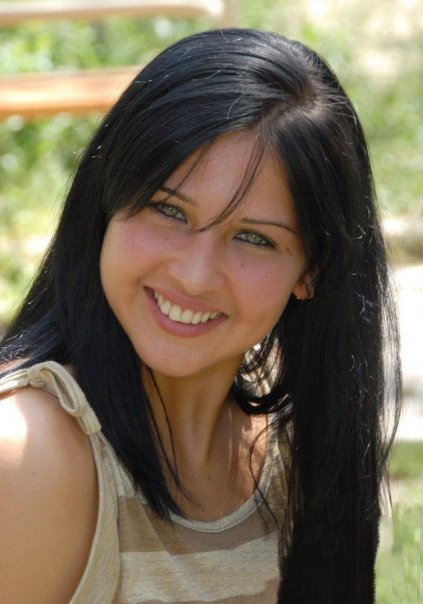

Personal information
- Full name: Valeriya Korotenko
- Nationality: Azerbaijani
- Born: 29 January 1984 (age 42); Baku, Soviet Union
- Hometown: Baku, Azerbaijan
- Height: 1.74 m (5 ft 9 in)
- Weight: 68 kg (150 lb)
- Spike: 286 cm (113 in)
- Block: 272 cm (107 in)

Volleyball information
- Position: Libero
- Current club: Azerrail Baku
- Number: 12

Career
Years	Teams
2000–2001; 2001–2007; 2007; 2007–2008; 2008–2009; 2009–2018	Lokomotiv Baku; Azerrail Baku; Voléro Zürich; Azerrail Baku; Fenerbahçe; Azerrail Baku

National team
2002–2017	Azerbaijan

Valeriya Korotenko (born 29 January 1984) is a retired Azerbaijani volleyball player who played as a Libero. She was a member of Azerbaijan women's national volleyball team and was selected as the Best Libero of European Volleyball Championship in 2005 and 2017.

== Career ==
Born in Baku, Valeriya first played volleyball at age nine and joined the school volleyball team.

She played 180 times for the Azerbaijan women's national volleyball team and was awarded the best libero of 2005 Women's European Volleyball Championship.

Korotenko was a member of Azerrail Baku and Volero Zurich before joining Fenerbahçe Women's Volleyball team. She won the bronze medal at the 2008–09 CEV Cup playing with Fenerbahçe Acıbadem and was awarded "Best Receiver".

Korotenko played with Azerrail Baku winning the 2015–16 Azerbaijan Super League championship and she became Best Libero.

== Awards ==
=== Individuals ===
- 2001-02 CEV Top Teams Cup "Best Libero"
- 2004-05 CEV Champions' League "Best Libero"
- 2005 European Championship "Best Libero"
- 2005 Yeltsin Cup "Best Libero"
- 2005-06 CEV Champions' League "Best Libero"
- 2006 FIVB World Grand Prix - European Qualification "Best Libero"
- 2006 FIVB World Grand Prix Preliminary Round "Best Libero"
- 2007-08 Turkish League "Best Libero"
- 2008-09 CEV Cup "Best Libero"
- 2010 World Championship 2nd Qualification Round "Best Receiver"
- 2010 World Championship 2nd Qualification Round "Best Libero"
- 2010 World Championship 3rd Qualification Round "Best Receiver"
- 2009-10 Azerbaijan Cup "Best Libero"
- 2010-2011 CEV GM Challenge Cup Final "Best Player"
- 2015–16 Azerbaijan Super League "Best Libero"
- 2017 European Championship "Best Libero"

=== Club ===
- 2001-02 CEV Cup - Champion, with Azerrail Baku
- 2007 Swiss Women's Volleyball League - Champion, with Voléro Zürich
- 2008-09 Turkish Women's Volleyball League - Champion, with Fenerbahçe Acıbadem
- 2010-11 Azerbaijan Women's Volleyball Super League - Runner-Up, with Azerrail Baku
- 2012–13 Azerbaijan Women's Volleyball Super League - Runner-Up, with Azerrail Baku
- 2015–16 Azerbaijan Super League - Champion, with Azerrail Baku

Awards
Preceded by (Russia) Anna Malova	Best Libero of European Championship; 2017	Succeeded by TBD
