= 2012–13 Azerbaijan Women's Volleyball Super League =

2012-2013 Azerbaijan Women's Volleyball Super League
- Sport: Volleyball
- Founded: 2008
- No. of teams: 7
- Country: Azerbaijan
- Continent: (European Union) Europe
- Most recent champion: Rabita Baku
- Website: Azerbaijan Volleyball Federation

The 2012/13 season of the Azerbaijan Women's Volleyball Super League (Azerbaijani: Azərbaycan Volleybol Superliqası), was the annual season of the country's highest volleyball level and was conquered for 5th time in a row by Rabita Baku.

== Teams ==
1. Rabita Baku
2. Igtisadchi Baku
3. Azerrail Baku
4. Lokomotiv Baku
5. Baki-Azeryol
6. Telekom Baku
7. Lokomotiv Balajary

Pos	Team	Pld	W	L	Pts	SW	SL	SR	SPW	SPL	SPR
1st place, gold medalist(s)	Rabita Baku	24	22	2	66	69	15	4.600	2075	1609	1.290
2nd place, silver medalist(s)	Igtisadchi Baku	24	17	7	52	59	29	2.034	2050	1755	1.168
2nd place, silver medalist(s)	Azerrail Baku	24	17	7	52	56	26	2.154	1949	1728	1.128
4	Lokomotiv Baku	24	14	10	41	52	38	1.368	2032	1912	1.063
5	Baki-Azeryol	24	10	14	29	37	47	0.787	1827	1979	0.923
6	Telekom Baku	24	3	21	9	10	64	0.156	1334	1797	0.742
7	Lokomotiv Balajary	24	1	23	3	6	70	0.086	1287	1874	0.687

Following the decision of the Azerbaijan Women's Volleyball Super League, Igtisadchi Baku and Azerrail Baku shared the runner-up position; therefore, both teams are ranked at the 2nd place.

== Program ==
=== Round I ===
Date	Time		Score		Set 1	Set 2	Set 3	Set 4	Set 5	Total	Report
18 Oct	15:00	Lokomotiv Baku	3–0	Telekom Baku	25–18	25–17	25–13			75–48	
18 Oct	17:00	Baki-Azeryol	3–1	Lokomotiv Balajary	25–21	23–25	25–19	25–14		98–79	
18 Oct	19:00	Igtisadchi Baku	3–1	Azerrail Baku	26–24	22–25	27–25	27–25		102–99	

Date	Time		Score		Set 1	Set 2	Set 3	Set 4	Set 5	Total	Report
3 Nov	15:00	Igtisadchi Baku	3–0	Lokomotiv Balajary	25–13	25–11	25–16			75–40	
3 Nov	17:00	Telekom Baku	0–3	Baki-Azeryol	22–25	10–25	14–25			46–75	
3 Nov	19:00	Rabita Baku	3–1	Lokomotiv Baku	25–19	15–25	25–21	25–21		90–86	

Date	Time		Score		Set 1	Set 2	Set 3	Set 4	Set 5	Total	Report
7 Nov	15:00	Baki-Azeryol	1–3	Rabita Baku	17–25	34–32	17–25	21–25		89–107	
7 Nov	17:00	Azerrail Baku	3–0	Lokomotiv Balajary	25–11	25–10	25–12			75–33	
7 Nov	19:00	Igtisadchi Baku	3–0	Telekom Baku	25–22	25–9	25–21			75–52	

Date	Time		Score		Set 1	Set 2	Set 3	Set 4	Set 5	Total	Report
10 Nov	15:00	Telekom Baku	0–3	Azerrail Baku	17–25	19–25	12–25			48–75	
10 Nov	17:00	Rabita Baku	3–1	Igtisadchi Baku	25–15	24–26	26–24	27–25		102–90	
10 Nov	19:00	Lokomotiv Baku	3–1	Baki-Azeryol	25–14	26–28	25–15	25–19		101–76	

Date	Time		Score		Set 1	Set 2	Set 3	Set 4	Set 5	Total	Report
27 Nov	15:00	Igtisadchi Baku	3–1	Lokomotiv Baku	25–22	17–25	25–10	25–20		92–77	
27 Nov	17:00	Azerrail Baku	3–1	Rabita Baku	25–21	21–25	25–19	25–23		96–88	
27 Nov	19:00	Lokomotiv Balajary	0–3	Telekom Baku	21–25	20–25	21–25			62–75	

Date	Time		Score		Set 1	Set 2	Set 3	Set 4	Set 5	Total	Report
30 Nov	15:00	Rabita Baku	3–0	Lokomotiv Balajary	25–9	25–15	25–12			75–36	
30 Nov	17:00	Lokomotiv Baku	1–3	Azerrail Baku	23–25	25–23	26–28	20–25		94–101	
30 Nov	19:00	Baki-Azeryol	0–3	Igtisadchi Baku	15–25	25–27	12–25			52–77	

Date	Time		Score		Set 1	Set 2	Set 3	Set 4	Set 5	Total	Report
18 Dec	15:00	Azerrail Baku	3–0	Baki-Azeryol	25–17	25–18	30–28			80–63	
18 Dec	17:00	Lokomotiv Balajary	0–3	Lokomotiv Baku	18–25	20–25	17–25			55–75	
18 Dec	19:00	Telekom Baku	0–3	Rabita Baku	15–25	18–25	18–25			51–75	

=== Round II ===
Date	Time		Score		Set 1	Set 2	Set 3	Set 4	Set 5	Total	Report
23 Dec	15:00	Lokomotiv Balajary	0–3	Igtisadchi Baku	21–25	16–25	10–25			47–75	
23 Dec	17:00	Baki-Azeryol	3–0	Telekom Baku	25–17	25–20	25–18			75–55	
23 Dec	19:00	Lokomotiv Baku	1–3	Rabita Baku	29–27	15–25	17–25	10–25		71–102	

Date	Time		Score		Set 1	Set 2	Set 3	Set 4	Set 5	Total	Report
8 Jan	13:00	Rabita Baku	3–1	Baki-Azeryol	27–29	25–13	25–22	26–24		103–88	
8 Jan	15:00	Telekom Baku	0–3	Igtisadchi Baku	15–25	17–25	19–25			51–75	
8 Jan	17:00	Lokomotiv Balajary	0–3	Azerrail Baku	15–25	11–25	13–25			39–75	

Date	Time		Score		Set 1	Set 2	Set 3	Set 4	Set 5	Total	Report
11 Jan	13:00	Azerrail Baku	3–0	Telekom Baku	28–26	25–19	25–19			78–64	
11 Jan	15:00	Igtisadchi Baku	3–2	Rabita Baku	26–24	25–18	29–31	20–25	17–15	117–113	
11 Jan	17:00	Baki-Azeryol	1–3	Lokomotiv Baku	19–25	19–25	25–18	18–25		81–93	

Date	Time		Score		Set 1	Set 2	Set 3	Set 4	Set 5	Total	Report
28 Jan	13:00	Lokomotiv Baku	2–3	Igtisadchi Baku	25–21	25–18	19–25	19–25	11–15	99–104	
28 Jan	15:00	Rabita Baku	3–0	Azerrail Baku	25-20	25-22	25-22			75–0	
28 Jan	17:00	Telekom Baku	3–0	Lokomotiv Balajary	25-19	25-19	25-12			75–0	

Date	Time		Score		Set 1	Set 2	Set 3	Set 4	Set 5	Total	Report
1 Feb	13:00	Lokomotiv Balajary	0–3	Rabita Baku	15-25	19-25	20-25			54–0	
1 Feb	15:00	Telekom Baku	0–3	Lokomotiv Baku	14-25	16-25	21-25			51–0	
1 Feb	17:00	Igtisadchi Baku	2–3	Baki-Azeryol	22-25	23-25	25-20	25-23	12-15	107–0	

Date	Time		Score		Set 1	Set 2	Set 3	Set 4	Set 5	Total	Report
6 Feb	13:00	Lokomotiv Balajary	0–3	Baki-Azeryol	17-25	13-25	17-25			47–0	

Date	Time		Score		Set 1	Set 2	Set 3	Set 4	Set 5	Total	Report
18 Feb	13:00	Baki-Azeryol	0–3	Azerrail Baku	16-25	27-29	23-25			66–0	
18 Feb	15:00	Lokomotiv Baku	3–0	Lokomotiv Balajary	25-16	25-16	25-15			75–0	
18 Feb	17:00	Rabita Baku	3–0	Telekom Baku	25-16	25-14	25-12			75–0	

=== Round III ===
Date	Time		Score		Set 1	Set 2	Set 3	Set 4	Set 5	Total	Report
22 Feb	15:00	Lokomotiv Baku	3–0	Telekom Baku	25–22	25–20	25–22			75–64	
22 Feb	17:00	Baki-Azeryol	3–1	Lokomotiv Balajary	22–25	25–14	25–15	25–19		97–73	
22 Feb	19:00	Igtisadchi Baku	3–1	Azerrail Baku	25–23	22–25	25–20	25–15		97–83	

Date	Time		Score		Set 1	Set 2	Set 3	Set 4	Set 5	Total	Report
25 Feb	15:00	Igtisadchi Baku	3–0	Lokomotiv Balajary	25-17	25-11	25-18			75–0	
25 Feb	17:00	Telekom Baku	0–3	Baki-Azeryol	18-25	21-25	11-25			50–0	
25 Feb	19:00	Rabita Baku	3–1	Lokomotiv Baku	25-20	21-25	25-14	31-29		102–0	

Date	Time		Score		Set 1	Set 2	Set 3	Set 4	Set 5	Total	Report
28 Feb	17:00	Igtisadchi Baku	0–3	Azerrail Baku	21-25	23-25	20-25			64–0	
28 Feb	19.00	Baki-Azeryol	1–3	Rabita Baku	17-25	23-25	25-23	12-25		77–0	

Date	Time		Score		Set 1	Set 2	Set 3	Set 4	Set 5	Total	Report
3 Mar	17:00	Azerrail Baku	3–0	Lokomotiv Balajary	25-23	25-21	25-22			75–0	
3 Mar	19:00	Igtisadchi Baku	3–0	Telekom Baku	25-16	25-19	25-19			75–0	

Date	Time		Score		Set 1	Set 2	Set 3	Set 4	Set 5	Total	Report
18 Mar	15:00	Telekom Baku	0–3	Azerrail Baku	9-25	19-25	23-25			51–0	
18 Mar	17:00	Rabita Baku	3–0	Igtisadchi Baku	25-14	25-21	25-23			75–0	
18 Mar	19:00	Lokomotiv Baku	3–1	Baki-Azeryol	21-25	25-17	25-22	25-17		96–0	

Date	Time		Score		Set 1	Set 2	Set 3	Set 4	Set 5	Total	Report
25 Mar	15:00	Rabita Baku	3–0	Lokomotiv Balajary	25-10	25-3	25-14			75–0	
25 Mar	17:00	Lokomotiv Baku	3–2	Azerrail Baku	25-21	23-25	25-23	15-25	15-7	103–0	

Date	Time		Score		Set 1	Set 2	Set 3	Set 4	Set 5	Total	Report
28 Mar	15:00	Lokomotiv Balajary	0–3	Lokomotiv Baku	14-25	21-25	15-25			50–0	
28 Mar	17:00	Azerrail Baku	1–3	Baki-Azeryol	18-25	25-22	19-25	19-25		81–0	
28 Mar	19:00	Telekom Baku	0–3	Rabita Baku	16-25	14-25	11-25			41–0	

Date	Time		Score		Set 1	Set 2	Set 3	Set 4	Set 5	Total	Report
1 Apr	17:00	Azerrail Baku	3–1	Lokomotiv Baku	25-20	21-25	25-19	25-17		96–0	
1 Apr	19:00	Baki-Azeryol	0–3	Igtisadchi Baku	19-25	15-25	15-25			49–0	

Date	Time		Score		Set 1	Set 2	Set 3	Set 4	Set 5	Total	Report
4 Apr	15:00	Lokomotiv Balajary	3–1	Telekom Baku	25-22	25-18	17-25	25-15		92–0	
4 Apr	17:00	Azerrail Baku	0–3	Rabita Baku	18-25	23-25	19-25			60–0	
4 Apr	19:00	Igtisadchi Baku	2–3	Lokomotiv Baku	23-25	25-19	27-25	23-25	15-17	113–0	

=== Round IV ===
Date	Time		Score		Set 1	Set 2	Set 3	Set 4	Set 5	Total	Report
8 Apr	15:00	Telekom Baku	0–3	Lokomotiv Baku	11-25	16-25	18-25			45–0	
8 Apr	17:00	Lokomotiv Balajary	0–3	Baki-Azeryol	16-25	17-25	17-25			50–0	
8 Apr	19:00	Azerrail Baku	3–1	Igtisadchi Baku	13-25	25-23	25-11	25-21		88–0	

Date	Time		Score		Set 1	Set 2	Set 3	Set 4	Set 5	Total	Report
11 Apr	15:00	Lokomotiv Balajary	0–3	Igtisadchi Baku	19-25	14-25	10-25			43–0	
11 Apr	17:00	Baki-Azeryol	3–0	Telekom Baku	25-19	25-22	25-18			75–0	
11 Apr	19:00	Lokomotiv Baku	0–3	Rabita Baku	23-25	28-30	21-25			72–0	

Date	Time		Score		Set 1	Set 2	Set 3	Set 4	Set 5	Total	Report
14 Apr	15:00	Rabita Baku	3–0	Baki-Azeryol	25-21	25-12	25-21			75–0	
14 Apr	17:00	Telekom Baku	0–3	Igtisadchi Baku	12-25	16-25	10-25			38–0	
14 Apr	19:00	Lokomotiv Balajary	0–3	Azerrail Baku	19-25	21-25	18-25			58–0	

Date	Time		Score		Set 1	Set 2	Set 3	Set 4	Set 5	Total	Report
17 Apr	15:00	Azerrail Baku	3–0	Telekom Baku	25-17	25-20	25-20			75–0	
17 Apr	17:00	Igtisadchi Baku	2–3	Rabita Baku	25–22	21–25	21–25	28–26	10–15	105–113	
17 Apr	19:00	Baki-Azeryol	1–3	Lokomotiv Baku	25-18	19-25	19-25	16-25		79–0	

Date	Time		Score		Set 1	Set 2	Set 3	Set 4	Set 5	Total	Report
20 Apr	15:00	Lokomotiv Baku	3–0	Lokomotiv Balajary	25-17	25-18	25-22			75–0	
20 Apr	17:00	Baki-Azeryol	0–3	Azerrail Baku	17-25	18-25	29-31			64–0	
20 Apr	19:00	Rabita Baku	3–0	Telekom Baku	25-17	25-10	25-11			75–0	

Date	Time		Score		Set 1	Set 2	Set 3	Set 4	Set 5	Total	Report
23 Apr	15:00	Lokomotiv Balajary	0–3	Rabita Baku	19-25	15-25	12-25			46–0	
23 Apr	17:00	Azerrail Baku	3–1	Lokomotiv Baku	25-18	28-30	25-22	25-15		103–0	
23 Apr	19:00	Igtisadchi Baku	3–0	Baki-Azeryol	25-17	25-21	25-20			75–0	

Date	Time		Score		Set 1	Set 2	Set 3	Set 4	Set 5	Total	Report
26 Apr	14:00	Telekom Baku	3–1	Lokomotiv Balajary	25-22	24-26	25-20	25-22		99–0	
26 Apr	16:00	Lokomotiv Baku	1–3	Igtisadchi Baku	25-19	15-25	23-25	20-25		83–0	
26 Apr	18:00	Rabita Baku	3–0	Azerrail Baku	25-19	28-26	25-14			78–0	

== Awards ==
- MVP: (Colombia) Madelaynne Montaño (Rabita Baku)
- Best scorer: (Czech Republic) Aneta Havlíčková (Lokomotiv Baku)
- Best setter: (Poland) Katarzyna Skorupa (Rabita Baku)
- Best blocker: (United States) Lauren Paolini (Igtisadchi Baku)
- Best server: (Germany) Corina Ssuschke-Voigt (Lokomotiv Baku)
- Best spiker: (United States) Foluke Akinradewo (Rabita Baku)
- Best receiver: (Puerto Rico) Áurea Cruz (Rabita Baku)
- Best digger: (Azerbaijan) Valeriya Korotenko (Azerrail Baku)
- Best libero: (Dominican Republic) Brenda Castillo (Rabita Baku)
