= Lokomotiv Balajary =

Azerbaijani volleyball club

Lokomotiv Balajary VC
- Full name: Lokomotiv Balajary
- Founded: 2012
- League: Azerbaijan Superleague

Lokomotiv Balajary is an Azerbaijani women's volleyball club

== History ==
Lokomotiv Balajary is an Azerbaijani women's volleyball club and immediately got the right to participate in the 2012-2013 Azerbaijan Women's Volleyball Super League.
