= Erzurum Gençlik SK =

Turkish sports club

- Founded: March 14, 1995
- Based in: Erzurum, Turkey
- Colors: Blue & white
- Owner: Erzurum Youth and Sport Directoriate (GSİM)
- President: Memduh Ceyhan
- Website: www.erzurumgencliksporkulubu.com

Active branches of Erzurum Gençlik SK
Archery	Athletics	Badminton	Basketball
Billiards	Bodybuilding	Boxing	Canoeing
Chess	Curling	Cycling	Fencing
Figure skating	Folk dancing	Golf	Gymnastics
Handball	Hockey	Ice hockey	Judo
Karate	Kickboxing	Luge	Mountaineering
Rowing	Skiing	Scouting	Swimming
Table tennis	Taekwondo	Tennis	Volleyball
Weightlifting	Wrestling

Erzurum Gençlik Spor Kulübü is a multi-sports club established on March 14, 1995, by the Youth and Sport Directoriate (Erzurum GSİM) in Erzurum, Turkey. The club's colors are blue and white. Erzurum Gençlik SK is active in more than 30 branches, including many Olympic sports.

== Venues ==
Main venues of the club are:

- Erzurum GSIM Ice Arena: Ice hockey arena with 3,000 seating capacity, home of men's ice hockey team
- Erzurum GSIM Ice Arena: Ice hockey arena with 500 seating capacity, home of women's ice hockey team
- GSIM Yenişehir Ice Hockey Hall: ice skating and ice hockey rink with 2,000 seating capacity
- Milli Piyango Curling Arena: curling arena with 1,000 seating capacity
- Kiremitliktepe Ski Jump: Two competition jump towers of K-125 and K-95 as well as three training jump towers of K-65, K-40 and K-20 for ski jumping

== Teams ==
=== Curling ===
The women's team plays in the Turkish Curling Women's League.

In 2011, the women's team won the Federation Cup defeating Erzurum Çelebi SK in the final. They became champion at the 2011-12 Turkish Curling Women's League before Erzurum Çelebi SK.

=== Ice hockey ===
The men's team plays in the Turkish Ice Hockey Super League and the women's team in the Turkish Ice Hockey Women's League.

=== Volleyball ===
The women's team plays in the Turkish Women's Third League.
