= Absheron VC =

Azerbaijani women's volleyball club

Absheron
- Full name: Absheron VC
- Founded: 2017
- Ground: Palace of Hand Games (Capacity: 2,500)
- Manager: (Azerbaijan) Eldar Yusubov
- Captain: (Azerbaijan) Aynur Imanova
- League: Azerbaijan Superleague
- 2021-2022: 1st

Absheron (Azerbaijani: Abşeron) is an Azerbaijani women's volleyball club based in Baku that competes in the Azerbaijan Superleague.

== History ==
Absheron women's volleyball club was established in 2017 and joined the Azerbaijan Superleague in the same year. The club took the second place in the 2017–18 season and third place in the 2018–19 season. In the 2021–22 season, Absheron won all of its games in the first 9 rounds and won the Superleague for the first time in its history, 3 rounds before the end of the league.

== Honours ==
- Azerbaijan Superleague:
  - Winners (1): 2021-22
  - Runners-up (1): 2017-18
  - Third (1): 2018-19
