= Jeyran Imanova =

Azerbaijani volleyball player (born 1995)

Personal information
- Nationality: Azerbaijani
- Born: Jeyran Aliyeva; 3 January 1995 (age 31); Baku, Azerbaijan
- Height: 1.65 m (5 ft 5 in)
- Weight: 61 kg (134 lb)
- Spike: 250 cm (98 in)
- Block: 242 cm (95 in)

Volleyball information
- Position: Libero
- Current club: Azerrail Baku
- Number: 1

National team
Azerbaijan

Jeyran Imanova (née Aliyeva; born 3 January 1995) is an Azerbaijani volleyball player for Azerrail Baku and the Azerbaijani national team.

She participated at the 2017 Women's European Volleyball Championship.
