= Azerbaijan Volleyball Federation =

Governing body of volleyball in Azerbaijan

- Sport: Volleyball
- Abbreviation: AVF
- Founded: 1991
- Affiliation: International Volleyball Federation (FIVB)
- Regional affiliation: European Volleyball Confederation
- Headquarters: Baku, Azerbaijan
- President: Javid Gurbanov

Official website
- www.avf.az
- (Azerbaijan)

The Azerbaijan Volleyball Federation (AVF) (Azerbaijani: Azərbaycan Voleybol Federasiyası) is the governing body of volleyball and beach volleyball in Azerbaijan. The Azerbaijan Volleyball Federation was founded in 1991, and became a member of the International Volleyball Federation (FIVB) and the European Volleyball Confederation (CEV) in 1992. The Azerbaijan Volleyball Federation's president is Javid Gurbanov. Its headquarters are located in Baku.

== See also ==
- Azerbaijan Volleyball League
- Azerbaijan Women's Volleyball Super League
