= Nagliyatchi VC =

- Full name: Nəqliyyatçı Bakı
- Founded: 2005
- Manager: (Azerbaijan) Feliks Mammadov
- League: Azerbaijan Superleague

Nagliyatchi VC is an Azerbaijani women's volleyball club from Baku.

== Team 2009-2010 ==
As of December 2009

Number	Player	Position	Height (m)	Birth date
1	(Russia) Evgeniya Kozhukhova	Middle Blocker	1.88	03/06/1990
2	(Russia) Valeriya Goncharova	Wing Spiker	1.88	03/01/1988
3	(Russia) Lesya Makhno	Wing Spiker	1.82	04/09/1981
5	(Russia) Maria Duskryadchenko	Middle Blocker	1.87	09/03/1984
6	(Azerbaijan) Oksana Parkhomenko	Setter	1.84	28/07/1984
7	(Russia) Natalya Safronova	Wing Spiker	1.89	06/02/1979
8	(Russia) Nataliya Goncharova	Wing Spiker	1.96	01/06/1989
9	(Russia) Victoria Kuzyakina	Libero	1.75	01/06/1985
10	(Russia) Anna Matienko	Setter	1.82	12/07/1981
12	(Italy) Simona Gioli	Middle Blocker	1.85	17/09/1977
13	(Russia) Elena Ehzova	Libero	1.77	14/08/1977
17	(Russia) Elena Godina	Wing Spiker	1.94	17/09/1977
