= 2013–14 Azerbaijan Women's Volleyball Super League =

2013-2014 Azerbaijan Women's Volleyball Super League
- Sport: Volleyball
- Founded: 2008
- No. of teams: 6
- Country: Azerbaijan
- Continent: (European Union) Europe
- Most recent champion: Rabita Baku
- Most titles: Rabita Baku
- Website: Azerbaijan Volleyball Federation

The 2013/14 season of the Azerbaijan Women's Volleyball Super League (Azerbaijani: Azərbaycan Volleybol Superliqası), was the sixth annual season of the country's highest volleyball level. Rabita Baku won their sixth consecutive title.

== Members of the Azerbaijan Women's Volleyball Super League (2013–14 season) ==
Note: Table lists in alphabetical order.

Location of teams in 2014-15 Azerbaijan First Division

Team	Location	Stadium	Stadium capacity
Azerrail Baku	Baku	Baku Sports Hall	1,600
Azeryol Baku	Baku	Baku Sports Hall	1,600
Igtisadchi Baku	Baku	Baku Sports Hall	1,600
Lokomotiv Baku	Baku	Baku Sports Hall	1,600
Rabita Baku	Baku	Baku Sports Hall	1,600
Telekom Baku	Baku	Baku Sports Hall	1,600

Pos	Team	Pld	W	L	Pts	SW	SL	SR	SPW	SPL	SPR
1st place, gold medalist(s)	Rabita Baku	15	13	2	38	41	11	3.727	1261	1032	1.222
2nd place, silver medalist(s)	Azeryol Baku	15	13	2	34	40	23	1.739	1533	1339	1.145
3rd place, bronze medalist(s)	Igtisadchi Baku	16	10	6	31	37	26	1.423	1425	1329	1.072
4	Azerrail Baku	16	5	11	19	24	38	0.632	1307	1413	0.925
5	Lokomotiv Baku	15	4	11	14	23	35	0.657	1231	1377	0.894
6	Telekom Baku	15	1	14	3	12	44	0.273	1122	1328	0.845

== Round 1 ==
Date	Time		Score		Set 1	Set 2	Set 3	Set 4	Set 5	Total	Report
17 Oct	17:00	Rabita Baku	3–0	Telekom Baku	25–19	25–20	25–18			75–57	75–57
17 Oct	19:00	Azeryol Baku	3–2	Azerrail Baku	18–25	25–18	30–28	21-25	15–12	109–83	109–108
17 Oct	21:00	Igtisadchi Baku	3–0	Lokomotiv Baku	25–15	25–19	25–22			75–56	75–56

Date	Time		Score		Set 1	Set 2	Set 3	Set 4	Set 5	Total	Report
23 Nov	12:00	Telekom Baku	3–2	Lokomotiv Baku	21–25	25–11	19–25	26-24	15-13	106–61	106–98
23 Nov	14:00	Azerrail Baku	2–3	Igtisadchi Baku	24–26	25–21	25–23	20-25	14-16	108–70	108–111
23 Nov	16:00	Rabita Baku	3–1	Azeryol Baku	29–27	24–26	25–18	25–21		103–92	103–92

Date	Time		Score		Set 1	Set 2	Set 3	Set 4	Set 5	Total	Report
25 Nov	13:00	Azeryol Baku	3–1	Telekom Baku	25–19	10–25	25–18	25–22		85–84	85–84

Date	Time		Score		Set 1	Set 2	Set 3	Set 4	Set 5	Total	Report
30 Nov	15:00	Lokomotiv Baku	3–0	Azerrail Baku	25–23	25–21	25–21			75–65	75–65

Date	Time		Score		Set 1	Set 2	Set 3	Set 4	Set 5	Total	Report
7 Dec	17:00	Telekom Baku	0–3	Azerrail Baku	22–25	23–25	22–25			67–75	67–75

Date	Time		Score		Set 1	Set 2	Set 3	Set 4	Set 5	Total	Report
8 Dec	17:00	Rabita Baku	3–0	Lokomotiv Baku	25–13	25–13	25–20			75–46	75–46

Date	Time		Score		Set 1	Set 2	Set 3	Set 4	Set 5	Total	Report
14 Dec	17:00	Igtisadchi Baku	3–1	Telekom Baku	19–25	25–15	25–19	25-19		94–59	94–78

Date	Time		Score		Set 1	Set 2	Set 3	Set 4	Set 5	Total	Report
10 Jan	15.00	Azerrail Baku	0–3	Rabita Baku	27–29	12–25	15–25	-	-	54–79	54–79
10 Jan	17.00	Lokomotiv Baku	1–3	Azeryol Baku	21–25	25–22	21–25	21-25	-	88–72	88–97

Date	Time		Score		Set 1	Set 2	Set 3	Set 4	Set 5	Total	Report
25 Jan	15:00	Telekom Baku	0–3	Rabita Baku	17–25	15–25	21–25			53–75	53–75
25 Jan	17.00	Azeryol Baku	3–2	Igtisadchi Baku	25–19	25–19	23–25	13-25	16-14	102–63	102–102

Date	Time		Score		Set 1	Set 2	Set 3	Set 4	Set 5	Total	Report
28 Jan	15.00	Azerrail Baku	2-3	Azeryol Baku	22-25	25-22	25-22	16-25	10-15	98–0	98-109
28 Jan	17.00	Lokomotiv Baku	3-2	Igtisadchi Baku	20-25	21-25	25–21	25-22	15-10	106–21	106–103

== Round 2 ==
Date	Time		Score		Set 1	Set 2	Set 3	Set 4	Set 5	Total	Report
31 Jan	14.00	Rabita Baku	1-3	Igtisadchi Baku	25-13	23-25	24-26	17-25	-	89–0	89–89

Date	Time		Score		Set 1	Set 2	Set 3	Set 4	Set 5	Total	Report
31 Jan	16:00	Azeryol Baku	3–1	Telekom Baku	25–15	26-24	14-25	25–16		90–31	90–80

Date	Time		Score		Set 1	Set 2	Set 3	Set 4	Set 5	Total	Report
7 Feb	15:00	Igtisadchi Baku	3–1	Azerrail Baku	25–21	23–25	25–21	25-17		98–67	98–84

Date	Time		Score		Set 1	Set 2	Set 3	Set 4	Set 5	Total	Report
8 Feb	15:00	Lokomotiv Baku	3–0	Telecom Baku	29–27	30–28	25–21			84–76	84–76

Date	Time		Score		Set 1	Set 2	Set 3	Set 4	Set 5	Total	Report
14 Feb	15:00	Azerrail Baku	3–1	Telecom Baku	24–26	25–21	25–22	25-18		99–69	99–87

Date	Time		Score		Set 1	Set 2	Set 3	Set 4	Set 5	Total	Report
15 Feb	15:00	Azeryol Baku	0–3	Rabita Baku	20–25	22-25	22-25			64–25	64–75

Date	Time		Score		Set 1	Set 2	Set 3	Set 4	Set 5	Total	Report
18 Feb	15:00	Azeryol Baku	3–1	Lokomotiv Baku	26–24	23–25	25–15	25-18		99–64	99–82

Date	Time		Score		Set 1	Set 2	Set 3	Set 4	Set 5	Total	Report
21 Feb	15:00	Azerrail Baku	3–2	Lokomotiv Baku	25–22	22–25	25–13	21-25	15-13	108–60	108–98
21 Feb	17:00	Rabita Baku	3–0	Igtisadchi Baku	25–21	25–15	25–20			75–56	75–56

Date	Time		Score		Set 1	Set 2	Set 3	Set 4	Set 5	Total	Report
28 Feb	15:00	Telekom Baku	1–3	Igtisadchi Baku	16–25	13–25	25–23	18-25		72–73	72–98

Date	Time		Score		Set 1	Set 2	Set 3	Set 4	Set 5	Total	Report
5 Mar	15:00	Igtisadchi Baku	0–3	Azeryol Baku	23–25	24-26	20-25			67–25	67–76

Date	Time		Score		Set 1	Set 2	Set 3	Set 4	Set 5	Total	Report
6 Mar	15:00	Rabita Baku	3–0	Azerrail Baku	25–17	25–18	25–20			75–55	75–55

Date	Time		Score		Set 1	Set 2	Set 3	Set 4	Set 5	Total	Report
7 Mar	15:00	Lokomotiv Baku	1–3	Rabita Baku	21–25	12-25	25-22	21-25		79–25	79–97

== Round 3 ==
Date	Time		Score		Set 1	Set 2	Set 3	Set 4	Set 5	Total	Report
10 Mar	15:00	Azeryol Baku	3–2	Azerrail Baku	25–13	25–13	19–25	23-25	15-13	107–51	107–89
10 Mar	17:00	Igtisadchi Baku	3–2	Lokomotiv Baku	25–20	19–25	23–25	25-23	15-11	107–70	107–104

Date	Time		Score		Set 1	Set 2	Set 3	Set 4	Set 5	Total	Report
12 Mar	15:00	Telekom Baku	0–3	Lokomotiv Baku	20–25	21–25	21–25			62–75	62–75
12 Mar	17:00	Azerrail Baku	0–3	Igtisadchi Baku	16–25	11–25	21–25			48–75	48–75

Date	Time		Score		Set 1	Set 2	Set 3	Set 4	Set 5	Total	Report
26 Mar	15:00	Azeryol Baku	3–2	Telekom Baku	25–9	22–25	27–25	21-25	15-8	110–59	110–92
26 Mar	17:00	Lokomotiv Baku	1–3	Azerrail Baku	25–21	20–25	22–25	19-25		86–71	86–96
26 Mar	19:00	Igtisadchi Baku	2–3	Rabita Baku	25–20	21–25	25–23	23-25	13-15	107–68	107–108

Date	Time		Score		Set 1	Set 2	Set 3	Set 4	Set 5	Total	Report
28 Mar	15:00	Telekom Baku	1–3	Azerrail Baku	20–25	21–25	25–21	18-25		84–71	84–96
28 Mar	17:00	Rabita Baku	3–0	Lokomotiv Baku	25–21	25–18	25–20			75–59	75–59
28 Mar	19:00	Azeryol Baku	3–1	Igtisadchi Baku	25–21	20–25	25–21	25-23		95–67	95–90

Date	Time		Score		Set 1	Set 2	Set 3	Set 4	Set 5	Total	Report
30 Mar	17:00	Rabita Baku	3–1	Telekom Baku	25–21	25-17	24-26	25-18		99–21	99–82

Date	Time		Score		Set 1	Set 2	Set 3	Set 4	Set 5	Total	Report
2 Apr	15:00	Igtisadchi Baku	3–0	Telekom Baku	25-22	25-16	25-18			75–0	75-56
2 Apr	17:00	Lokomotiv Baku	1–3	Azeryol Baku	25-23	22-25	24-26	24-26		95–0	95-100
2 Apr	19:00	Azerrail Baku	0-3	Rabita Baku	13-25	13-25	15-25			41–0	41-75

Date	Time		Score		Set 1	Set 2	Set 3	Set 4	Set 5	Total	Report
4 Apr	17:00	Rabita Baku	1–3	Azeryol Baku	25-23	21-25	21-25	19-25		86–0	86-98

== Semi-final ==
Date	Time		Score		Set 1	Set 2	Set 3	Set 4	Set 5	Total	Report
7 Apr	13:00	Rabita Baku	3–1	Azerrail Baku	22-25	25-11	25-23	25-21		97–0	97-80
7 Apr	15:00	Azeryol Baku	3–1	Igtisadchi Baku	25-16	17-25	25-21	25-14		92–0	92-76

Date	Time		Score		Set 1	Set 2	Set 3	Set 4	Set 5	Total	Report
9 Apr	13:00	Igtisadchi Baku	1–3	Azeryol Baku	26-28	22-25	25-23	20-25		93–0	93-101
9 Apr	15:00	Azerrail Baku	0–3	Rabita Baku	25-27	21-25	19-25			65–0	65-77

== 3rd place ==
Date	Time		Score		Set 1	Set 2	Set 3	Set 4	Set 5	Total	Report
14 Apr	13:00	Azerrail Baku	1–3	Igtisadchi Baku	25-20	15-25	24-26	23-25		87–0	87-96
15 Apr	13:00	Igtisadchi Baku	3–0	Azerrail Baku	27-25	25-20	26-24			78–0	78-69

== Final ==
Date	Time		Score		Set 1	Set 2	Set 3	Set 4	Set 5	Total	Report
14 Apr	15:00	Rabita Baku	3–1	Azeryol Baku	26–28	25–20	25–21	25–19		101–88	101–88
15 Apr	15:00	Azeryol Baku	1–3	Rabita Baku	16-25	25-20	16-25	19-25		76–0	76-95
18 Apr	15:00	Rabita Baku	3–0	Azeryol Baku	25–23	28–26	25–16			78–65	78–65

== Awards ==
- MVP: (Puerto Rico) Aurea Cruz (Rabita Baku)
- MVP of Final : (Poland) Katarzyna Skowrońska (Rabita Baku)
- Best scorer : (Poland) Katarzyna Skowrońska (Rabita Baku)
- Best setter : (Thailand) Nootsara Tomkom (Rabita Baku)
- Best blocker : (Dominican Republic) Annerys Vargas (Azeryol Baku)
- Best server : (Netherlands) Manon Flier (Igtisadchi Baku)
- Best spiker : (Thailand) Pleumjit Thinkaow (Igtisadchi Baku)
- Best receiver : (Puerto Rico) Aurea Cruz (Rabita Baku)
- Best digger : (Puerto Rico) Aurea Cruz (Rabita Baku)
- Best libero : (Dominican Republic) Brenda Castillo (Rabita Baku)
