= Azerbaijan Women's Volleyball League =

Azerbaijan Women's Volleyball Super League
- Sport: Volleyball
- First season: 2008
- No. of teams: 10
- Country: Azerbaijan
- Continent: (European Union) Europe
- Most recent champion: DH Volley (2025-26)
- Most titles: Telekom Baku (8)
- Qualification: CEV Women's Champions League; Women's CEV Cup; CEV Women's Challenge Cup
- Broadcaster: CBC Sport
- Website: Azerbaijan Volleyball Federation

The Azerbaijan Women's Volleyball League (Azerbaijani: Azərbaycan Volleybol Liqası), is the highest professional women's volleyball league in Azerbaijan.

== Clubs of the League (2026-27 season) ==
Team
(Azerbaijan) Absheron VC
(Azerbaijan) Azerrail Baku
(Azerbaijan) DH Volley
(Azerbaijan) Gence VC
(Azerbaijan) Gənclər
(Azerbaijan) Milli Aviasiya Akademiyası
(Azerbaijan) Momine Khatun VC
(Azerbaijan) Murov Az Terminal
(Azerbaijan) Turan VC
(Azerbaijan) UNEC VC

== List of women's champions ==
| Season | Winner | Runner-up | Third |
|---|---|---|---|
| 2008–09 | Rabita Baku | Azerrail Baku | Lokomotiv Baku |
| 2009–10 | Rabita Baku | Lokomotiv Baku | Igtisadchi Baku |
| 2010–11 | Rabita Baku | Azerrail Baku | Igtisadchi Baku |
| 2011–12 | Rabita Baku | Lokomotiv Baku | Baki-Azeryol |
| 2012–13* | Rabita Baku | Igtisadchi Baku; Azerrail Baku | (not awarded) |
| 2013–14 | Rabita Baku | Azeryol Baku | Igtisadchi Baku |
| 2014–15 | Rabita Baku | Lokomotiv Baku | Azeryol Baku |
| 2015–16 | Azerrail Baku | Telekom Baku | Lokomotiv Baku |
| 2016–17 | Telekom Baku | Azerrail Baku | Azeryol Baku |
| 2017–18 | Azerrail Baku | Absheron | AVF |
| 2018–19 | Azerrail Baku | Lokomotiv Baku | Absheron |
| 2019–20 | Not completed due to the Covid-19 pandemic. | | |
| 2020–21 | Not held due to the Covid-19 pandemic | | |
| 2021–22 | Absheron | Azerrail Baku | Murov |
| 2022–23 | Azerrail Baku | Absheron | Murov |
| 2023–24 | Azerrail Baku | Absheron | Murov |
| 2024–25 | Azerrail Baku | Absheron | National Aviation Academy |
| 2025-26 | Turan VC | DH Volley | Gence VC |

== Most successful teams ==
| Club | Winners | Runners-up |
|---|---|---|
| Telekom Baku | 8 (2009, 2010, 2011, 2012, 2013, 2014, 2015, 2017) | 1 (2016) |
| Azerrail Baku | 6 (2016, 2018, 2019, 2023, 2024, 2025) | 5 (2009, 2011, 2013, 2017, 2022) |
| Absheron | 1 (2022) | 4 (2018, 2023, 2024, 2025) |
| Lokomotiv Baku | | 4 (2010, 2012, 2015, 2019) |
| Azeryol Baku | | 1 (2014) |
| Igtisadchi Baku | | 1 (2013) |

== See also ==
- Azerbaijan Volleyball League
- Azerbaijan Volleyball Federation
