= Azerrail Baku =

- Full name: Azerrail Baku
- Founded: 2001
- Ground: Palace of Hand Games (Capacity: 2500)
- Chairman: (Azerbaijan) Ramin Azizov
- Manager: (Italy) Paolo Tofoli
- Captain: (Azerbaijan) Aynur Imanova
- League: Azerbaijan Superleague
- 2024-25: 1st

Azerrail Baku (Azerbaijani: Azərreyl Bakı) is an Azerbaijani women's volleyball club based in Baku. Azerrail is a six-time champion of Azerbaijan Women's Volleyball League and the winner of CEV Cup in 2002 and Challenge Cup in 2011.

== History ==
Azerrail was founded in 2001 in Baku, Azerbaijan. Under the management of head coach Faig Garayev, Azerrail soon established itself as one of the top clubs in Europe. In 2002, Azerrail won CEV Cup after beating OK Jedinstvo Užice in the final. Azerrail also became the base club for the Azerbaijan national team, producing players such Natalya Mammadova, Valeriya Mammadova, Oksana Kurt, Yelena Parkhomenko and Polina Rahimova.

The team continued to compete in European tournaments in the 2000s and 2010s. In 2011, Azerrail won the CEV Women's Challenge Cup after beating Lokomotiv Baku in the all Azerbaijani final.

After the establishment of Azerbaijan Women's Volleyball League in 2008, Azerrail had a rivalry with Rabita Baku. In the 2015-2016 season, Azerrail won the Superleague title for the first time. As of 2025, Azerrail continues to compete in the league.

== Current squad ==
Season 2024-2025

2024-2025 Team
Number	Player	Position	Birth date
	(Azerbaijan) Aynur Imanova	Blocker	December 7, 1988 (age 36)
	(Bulgaria) Nikol Milanova	Setter	August 10, 2002 (age 23)
	(Azerbaijan) Anastasia Gurbanova	Opposite hitter	December 4, 1989 (age 35)
	(Azerbaijan) Raziya Aliyeva	Setter	August 29, 2002 (age 23)
	(Azerbaijan) Aisha Alismanova	Outside hitter	August 23, 2008 (age 17)
	(Serbia) Irina Milanović	Outside hitter	September 23, 2002 (age 22)
	(Azerbaijan) Leyla Aliyeva	Outside hitter	January 1, 2009 (age 16)
	(Serbia) Milica Sorak	Outside hitter	September 22, 1998 (age 26)
	(Azerbaijan) Nilufer Aghazadeh	Blocker	June 19, 2001 (age 24)
	(Azerbaijan) Jeyran Imanova	Libero	January 3, 1995 (age 30)
	(Puerto Rico) Nayka Benitez	Libero	February 8, 1989 (age 36)
	(Colombia) Katherin Ramírez	Blocker	January 17, 2005 (age 20)

== Honours ==
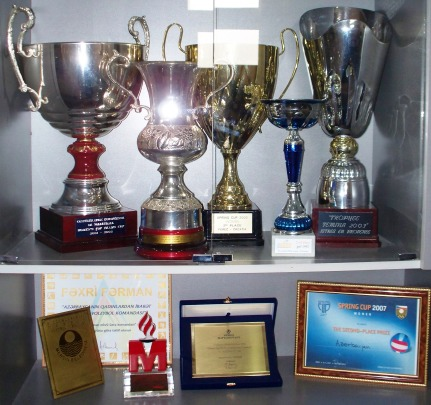
Many awards of Azerrail

Azerrail logo between 2001 and 2019

=== Domestic success ===
- Azerbaijan Superleague:
  - Winners (6): 2015-16, 2017-18, 2018–19, 2022-23, 2023-24, 2024-25
  - Runners-up (5): 2008–09, 2010–11, 2012–13, 2016-17, 2021-22

=== International success ===
- CEV Cup:
  - Winner: 2001-02
- Challenge Cup
  - Winner: 2010-11
