= 2013 FIVB Women's Club World Championship squads =

This article shows all participating team squads at the 2013 FIVB Women's Club World Championship squads, held from October 9 to 13, 2013 in Zürich, Switzerland.

== Pool A ==
=== Guangdong Evergrande ===
- Head Coach: (China) Lang Ping

Number	Player
1	(United States) Juliann Faucette
2	(China) Zhu Ting
3	(China) Wang Nan
5	(China) Shen Jingsi
6	(China) Yang Junjing
7	(Italy) Martina Guiggi
8	(China) Zeng Chunlei
9	(China) Zhang Xian (L)
10	(United States) Megan Hodge
11	(China) Xu Yunli
12	(China) Hui Ruoqi (c)
15	(China) Wang Ting

=== Kenya Prisons ===
- Head Coach: (Kenya) David Lungaho

Number	Player
1	(Kenya) Jane Wairimu
2	(Kenya) Everlyne Makuto
3	(Kenya) Diana Khisa (c)
4	(Kenya) Esther Mwombe
5	(Kenya) Salome Wanjala
7	(Kenya) Jane Jepkemboi
8	(Kenya) Joan Kibor
9	(Kenya) Elizabeth Wanyama (L)
12	(Kenya) Edith Mukuvilani
13	(Kenya) Dorcas Jepleting
14	(Kenya) Mercy Moim
15	(Kenya) Brackcides Khadambi

=== Voléro Zürich ===
- Head Coach: (Belgium) Jan De Brandt

Number	Player
2	(Brazil) Karine de Souza
3	(Serbia) Nađa Ninković
4	(Cuba) Kenia Carcaces
7	(Ukraine) Olesia Rykhliuk
9	(Serbia) Jovana Gogić
10	(Japan) Yuko Sano (L)
12	(Serbia) Mira Golubović
13	(Croatia) Nataša Osmokrović
14	(Croatia) Karla Klarić
16	(Switzerland) Inès Granvorka
17	(Switzerland) Laura Unternährer
18	(Romania) Nneka Onyejekwe (c)

== Pool B ==
=== Iowa Ice ===
- Head Coach: (United States) Janelle Hester

Number	Player
1	(United States) Carla Jenson
2	(Netherlands) Andrea Justine Landi
3	(United States) Amanda Craig
4	(United States) Natalie Smith
5	(United States) Kaylee Manns
6	(United States) Brittney Brimmage
7	(United States) Caitlin Mahoney
9	(United States) Devon Jensen (L)
13	(United States) Angela Bys
15	(United States) Megan Schipper (c)
17	(United States) Justine Young
18	(United States) Laurel Abrahamson

=== Unilever Vôlei ===
- Head Coach: (Brazil) Bernardo Rezende

Number	Player
1	(Brazil) Gabriela Guimarães
4	(Canada) Sarah Pavan
5	(Brazil) Regiane Bidias
6	(Brazil) Juciely Barreto
7	(Brazil) Hélia Souza (c)
8	(Brazil) Amanda Francisco
9	(Brazil) Bruna da Silva
11	(Serbia) Brankica Mihajlović
12	(Brazil) Roberta Ratzke
14	(Brazil) Fabiana de Oliveira (L)
15	(Brazil) Ana Carolina da Silva
18	(Brazil) Natasha Farinea

=== Vakıfbank Istanbul ===
- Head Coach: (Italy) Giovanni Guidetti

Number	Player
2	(Turkey) Gözde Kırdar Sonsırma (c)
3	(Turkey) Gizem Karadayı (L)
5	(Turkey) Kübra Akman
6	(Serbia) Jovana Brakočević
10	(Turkey) Güldeniz Önal
11	(Turkey) Bahar Toksoy
12	(Serbia) Jelena Nikolić
13	(Germany) Christiane Fürst
14	(Turkey) Çağla Akın
16	(Turkey) Polen Uslupehlivan
17	(Turkey) Naz Aydemir
18	(Italy) Carolina Costagrande
