= Guangdong Evergrande volleyball team statistics =

Chinese volleyball team statistics

This is Statistics of China women's volleyball club Guangdong Evergrande

== Team roster ==
=== Team member 2009-2010 ===
- Head coach: Lang Ping

Number	Player	Position	Height (m)	Spike (m)	Block (m)	Birth date
1	(China) Huo Xin	Middle blocker	1.88	3.05	3.00	20/06/1984
2	(China) Feng Kun (c)	Setter	1.83	3.15	3.08	28/12/1978
3	(China) Yang Hao	Outside hitter	1.83	3.18	3.10	21/03/1980
4	(United States) Christa Harmotto	Middle blocker	1.86	3.25	3.02	12/10/1986
5	(China) Liao Tingting	Opposite	1.85	3.03	3.00	12/10/1986
6	(China) Jiang Wei	Opposite	1.83	3.05	2.97	19/01/1982
7	(China) Zhou Suhong	Opposite	1.82	3.13	3.00	23/04/1979
8	(China) Zhou Jia	Middle blocker	1.86	3.15	3.05	15/03/1983
9	(China) Zhou Yuan	Outside hitter	1.80	3.17	3.00	15/12/1982
10	(China) Yin Meng	Middle blocker	1.90	3.19	3.10	11/01/1984
11	(China) Yin Juan	Setter	1.81	3.14	3.08	21/10/1984
12	(China) Yin Yin	Outside hitter	1.87	3.08	3.05	02/01/1974
13	(China) Wang Li	Outside hitter	1.87	3.08	2.98	20/01/1982
14	(China) Yang Jie	Opposite	1.85	3.10	3.00	27/02/1977
15	(United States) Nicole Davis	Libero	1.67	2.84	2.66	24/04/1982
16	(China) Yu Jing	Setter	1.85	3.05	2.95	22/05/1982
17	(China) Lou Xiaoman	Setter	1.85	3.06	2.97	02/091982
18	(China) Yu Ying	Libero	1.77	2.95	2.90	07/03/1989

=== Team member 2010-2011 ===
- Head coach: Lang Ping

Number	Player	Position	Height (m)	Spike (m)	Block (m)	Birth date
1	(China) Kang Yujie	Opposite/Outside Hitter	1.88	3.10	3.00	15/08/1987
2	(China) Feng Kun (c)	Setter	1.83	3.15	3.08	28/12/1978
3	(China) Suo Ma	Middle blocker	1.87	3.15	3.05	02/11/1979
4	(China) Zhao Yun	Setter	1.80	3.10	3.05	15/09/1981
5	(China) Liao Tingting	Opposite	1.85	3.03	3.00	12/10/1986
6	(Serbia) Jovana Brakočević	Opposite	1.96	3.09	2.95	05/03/1988
7	(China) Wang Yang	Middle blocker	1.83	3.05	2.90	07/06/1992
8	(China) Zhou Jia	Middle blocker	1.86	3.15	3.05	15/03/1983
9	(China) Zhou Yuan	Outside hitter	1.80	3.17	3.00	15/12/1982
10	(China) Yin Meng	Middle blocker	1.90	3.19	3.10	11/01/1984
11	(China) Yin Juan	Setter	1.81	3.14	3.08	21/10/1984
12	(China) Yu Ying	Libero	1.77	2.95	2.90	07/03/1989
13	(Thailand) Wilavan Apinyapong	Outside hitter	1.74	2.94	2.82	06/06/1984
15	(United States) Logan Tom	Outside hitter	1.86	3.15	3.05	25/05/1981
16	(China) Jiang Wei	Opposite/Libero	1.83	3.05	2.97	19/01/1982
17	(China) Lou Xiaoman	Setter	1.85	3.06	2.97	02/091982
18	(China) Wang Ke	Middle blocker	1.88	3.10	3.02	08/11/1988

=== Team member 2011-2012 ===
- Head coach: Lang Ping

Number	Player	Position	Height (m)	Spike (m)	Block (m)	Birth date
1	(Poland) Katarzyna Skowrońska	Opposite	1.88	3.15	3.10	30/06/1983
2	(China) Kang Yujie	Opposite/Outside Hitter	1.88	3.10	3.00	15/08/1987
3	(China) Suo Ma	Middle blocker	1.87	3.15	3.05	02/12/1979
4	(China) Zhao Yun (c)	Setter	1.80	3.10	3.05	15/09/1981
5	(China) Wang Lina	Outside hitter	1.81	3.15	3.05	02/05/1978
6	(China) Yu Ying	Libero	1.77	2.95	2.90	07/03/1989
7	(China) Wang Yang	Middle blocker	1.83	3.05	2.90	07/06/1992
8	(China) Zhou Jia	Middle blocker	1.86	3.15	3.05	15/03/1983
9	(China) Zhou Yuan	Outside hitter	1.80	3.17	3.00	15/12/1982
10	(China) Yin Meng	Middle blocker	1.90	3.19	3.10	11/01/1984
11	(China) Yin Juan	Setter	1.81	3.14	3.08	21/10/1984
12	(Italy) Carolina Costagrande	Outside hitter	1.88	3.15	3.05	15/10/1980
13	(China) He Ruobing	Middle blocker	1.90	3.10	3.05	04/09/1993
14	(China) Ren Guizhuo	Outside hitter	1.84	3.10	3.00	29/10/1992
15	(United States) Nicole Fawcett	Outside hitter/Opposite	1.93	3.15	3.10	16/12/1986
16	(China) Jiang Wei	Opposite/Libero	1.83	3.05	2.97	19/01/1982
17	(China) Zhu Qing	Setter	1.81	3.20	3.00	25/12/1983
18	(China) Wang Ting	Middle blocker	1.88	3.15	3.05	09/11/1984

== Best Scorer History ==
Rank	Player	Spike	Block	Serve	Total	Season	Average
1	(China) Zhou Yuan	453	21	36	510	3	170
2	(China) Yin Meng	325	99	41	465	3	155
3	(Serbia) Jovana Brakočević	356	39	32	427	1	427
4	(Poland) Katarzyna Skowrońska	358	18	22	398	1	398
5	(Italy) Carolina Costagrande	309	33	15	357	1	357
6	(United States) Logan Tom	254	32	35	321	1	321
7	(China) Suo Ma	172	88	35	295	2	147.5
8	(United States) Christa Harmotto	106	40	2	148	1	148
9	(China) Zhou Suhong	115	8	17	140	1	140
10	(China) Feng Kun	66	27	23	116	2	58
11	(China) Yang Hao	95	7	7	109	1	109
12	(China) Yin Yin	71	9	13	93	1	93
13	(China) Wang Li	61	8	10	79	1	79
14	(United States) Nicole Fawcett	45	5	2	52	1	52
15	(China) Wang Ting	27	18	4	49	1	49
15	(China) Zhao Yun	21	12	16	49	2	24.5
17	(China) Yang Jie	10	2	3	15	1	15
18	(Thailand) Wilavan Apinyapong	11	-	-	11	1	11
18	(China) Kang Yujie	8	1	2	11	2	5.5
18	(China) Wang Yang	5	4	2	11	2	5.5
21	(China) Wang Lina	8	1	1	10	1	10
22	(China) Yu Ying	5	-	1	6	3	2
23	(China) Yu Jing	2	2	1	5	1	5
24	(China) Liao Tingting	3	1	-	4	2	2
25	(China) Jiang Wei	2	-	2	4	3	1.3
26	(China) Zhu Qing	1	-	1	2	1	2
27	(China) Ren Guizhuo	1	-	-	1	1	1
