= SUO =

SUO or Suo may refer to:

== Surnames ==
=== Real people ===
- Suo (surname) (索), Chinese surname
- Suo Chen (died 316), Jin Dynasty military general
- Yoshikazu Suo (born 1953), Japanese musician
- Masayuki Suo (born 1959), Japanese film director
- Zhigang Suo (born 1963), Harvard School of Engineering professor
- Suo Ma (born 1979), Chinese volleyball player
- Suo Di (born 1993), Chinese badminton player
- Suo Ran (born 1994), Chinese swimmer

=== Fictional characters ===
- Suo Chao, fictional character in the Chinese classical novel Water Margin
- Suo Pavlichenko, fictional character in the anime series Darker than Black
- Yuki Suō, fictional character from the light novel Alya Sometimes Hides Her Feelings in Russian

== Places ==
- Suō Province, former province of Japan
- Sutton railway station (London) (station code: SUO), in London, UK
- Rosebud Sioux Tribal Airport (FAA LID: SUO), in Rosebud, South Dakota, US
- Sunriver Airport (IATA identifier: SUO), in Sunriver, Oregon, US

== Other uses ==
- Senior Under Officer, a military appointment in some Commonwealth countries
- Suo (journal), a soil science journal
- Standard upper ontology, in computing
- Bouni language (ISO 639: suo), a language of Papua New Guinea
