= Martina Guiggi =

Italian volleyball player (born 1984)

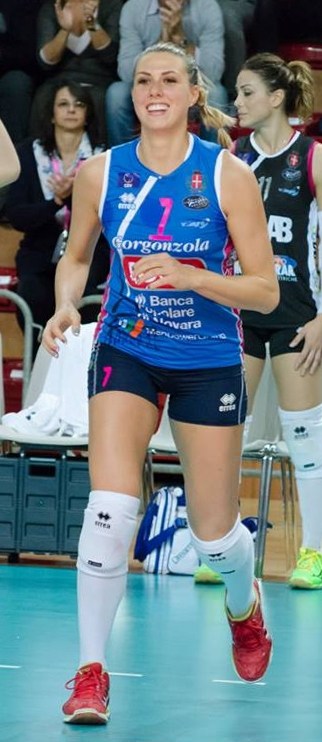
- Guiggi in 2014

Personal information
- Born: 1 May 1984 (age 42); Pisa, Italy
- Height: 1.90 m (6 ft 3 in)
- Weight: 80 kg (176 lb)
- Spike: 317 cm (125 in)
- Block: 312 cm (123 in)

Volleyball information
- Position: Middle blocker
Medal record
Women's volleyball
Representing Italy
Mediterranean Games
Gold medal – first place	2009 Pescara	Team

Martina Guiggi (born 1 May 1984) is an Italian volleyball player who plays as a middle blocker. She competed at the 2008 and 2016 Olympics and won the 2007 Women's European Volleyball Championship and 2007 FIVB Women's World Cup.

== Career ==
Guiggi was included to the national team in 2002, and in 2006 was named Best Blocker of the European Cup. She played at the 2013 Club World Championship with Guangdong Evergrande winning the bronze medal after defeating Voléro Zürich 3–1. Besides indoors volleyball she competed nationally in beach volleyball.

== Clubs ==
- (Italy) Asystel Novara (2001–2004)
- (Italy) Scavolini Pesaro (2004–2011)
- (Italy) MC-Carnaghi Villa Cortese (2011–2012)
- (Italy) Chieri Volley (2012–2013)
- (China) Guangdong Evergrande (2013–2014)
- (Italy) AGIL Novara (2014–2016)

== Personal life ==
Martina Guiggi is married to Mitar Tzourits.

== Awards ==
=== Clubs ===
- 2013 Club World Championship – Bronze medal, with Guangdong Evergrande
