= Xu Yunli =

Chinese volleyball player

Xu Yunli 徐云丽
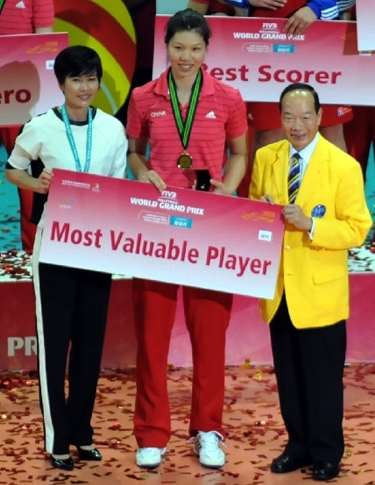

Personal information
- Full name: Xu Yunli
- Nickname: Da Lili
- Nationality: Chinese
- Born: 2 August 1987 (age 39) Fuzhou, China
- Home town: Fuzhou, China
- Height: 1.96 m (6 ft 5 in)
- Weight: 75 kg (165 lb)
- Spike: 325 cm (128 in)
- Block: 306 cm (120 in)

Volleyball information
- Position: Middle blocker

Career
- Years: Team
- 2013 2013–2017: Guangdong Evergrande; Fujian

National team
- Years: Team
- 2006–2014 2016–2017: China
Honours
Volleyball
Olympic Games
Gold medal – first place	2016 Rio de Janeiro	Team
Bronze medal – third place	2008 Beijing	Team
World Championship
Silver medal – second place	2014 Italy
World Cup
Bronze medal – third place	2011 Japan
World Grand Prix
Silver medal – second place	2007 Ningbo
Silver medal – second place	2013 Sapporo
Asian Games
Gold medal – first place	2006 Doha	Team
Gold medal – first place	2010 Guangzhou	Team
Asian Championship
Gold medal – first place	2011 Taipei
Silver medal – second place	2007 Nakhon Ratchasima
Silver medal – second place	2009 Hanoi
Asian Cup
Gold medal – first place	2008 Nakhon Ratchasima
Gold medal – first place	2010 Tai Cang
Silver medal – second place	2012 Almaty

Xu Yunli (simplified Chinese: 徐云丽; traditional Chinese: 徐雲麗; pinyin: Xú Yúnlì; born 2 August 1987) is a Chinese volleyball player. She was part of the gold medal winning team at the 2006 Asian Games and the silver medal winning team at the 2007 World Grand Prix.

== Career ==
Xu played at the 2013 Club World Championship with Guangdong Evergrande winning the bronze medal after defeating Voléro Zürich 3-1.

== Clubs ==
- (China) Fujian Xi Meng Bao (2005-2012)
- (China) Guangdong Evergrande (2012-2013)
- (China) Fujian Xi Meng Bao (2013-2017)

== Awards ==
=== Individuals ===
- 2012 Asian Cup "Best Blocker"
- 2013 Asian Club Championship "Most Valuable Player"
- 2013 Asian Club Championship "Best Blocker"
- 2013 Asian Championship "Best Blocker"

=== Clubs ===
- 2013 Asian Club Championship - Champion, with Guangdong Evergrande
- 2013 Club World Championship - Bronze medal, with Guangdong Evergrande

== See also ==
- China at the 2012 Summer Olympics#Volleyball
- Volleyball at the 2012 Summer Olympics – Women's tournament
