= Tomis Constanța =

Tomis Constanța may refer to:

- C.S. Volei 2004 Tomis Constanța - female volleyball club from Constanța, Romania
- C.V.M. Tomis Constanța - male volleyball club from Constanța, Romania
