= Wang Ting =

Wang Ting may refer to:

- Wang Ting (athlete), Paralympian athlete from China
- Wang Ting (volleyball) (born 1984), volleyball player from China
