= Brittney Brimmage =

American female volleyball player (born 1990)

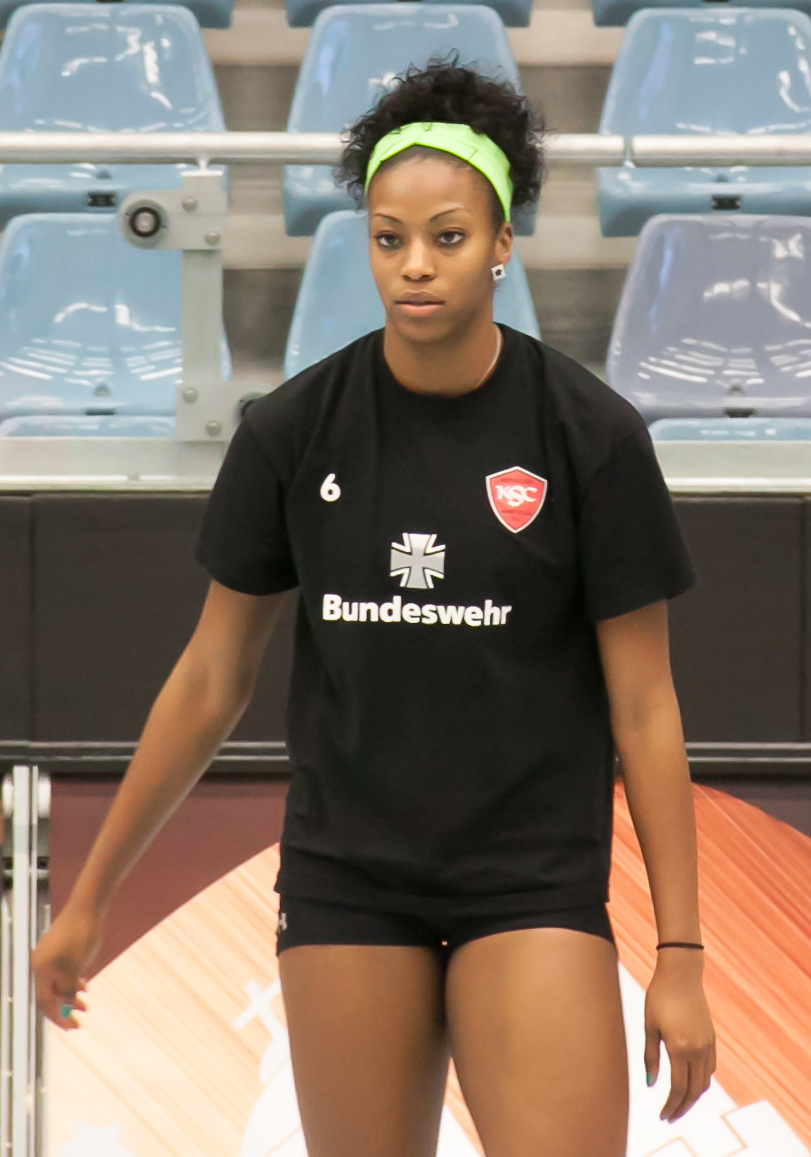

Personal information
- Nationality: American
- Born: May 5, 1990 (age 36)
- Height: 6 ft 3 in (191 cm)
- Weight: 179 lb (81 kg)
- Spike: 120 in (306 cm)
- Block: 120 in (305 cm)

Volleyball information
- Number: 6

Career
Years	Teams
2013	Iowa Ice

Brittney Brimmage (born May 5, 1990) is an American female volleyball player.

With her club Iowa Ice she competed at the 2013 FIVB Volleyball Women's Club World Championship.
