= Amanda Craig (volleyball) =

American female volleyball player (born 1984)

Personal information
- Nationality: American
- Born: February 22, 1984 (age 42)
- Height: 5 ft 8 in (173 cm)
- Weight: 141 lb (64 kg)
- Spike: 108 in (274 cm)
- Block: 107 in (272 cm)

Volleyball information
- Number: 3

Career
Years	Teams
2013	Iowa Ice

Amanda Craig (born February 22, 1984) is an American female volleyball player.

With her club Iowa Ice she competed at the 2013 FIVB Volleyball Women's Club World Championship.
