= Angela Bys =

American female volleyball player (born 1989)

Personal information
- Nationality: American
- Born: September 11, 1989 (age 37)
- Height: 6 ft 2 in (188 cm)
- Weight: 198 lb (90 kg)
- Spike: 108 in (274 cm)
- Block: 108 in (274 cm)

Volleyball information
- Number: 13

Career
Years	Teams
2013	Iowa Ice

Angela Bys (born September 11, 1989) is an American female volleyball player.

With her club Iowa Ice she competed at the 2013 FIVB Volleyball Women's Club World Championship.
