= Tuğçe Hocaoğlu =

Turkish volleyball player

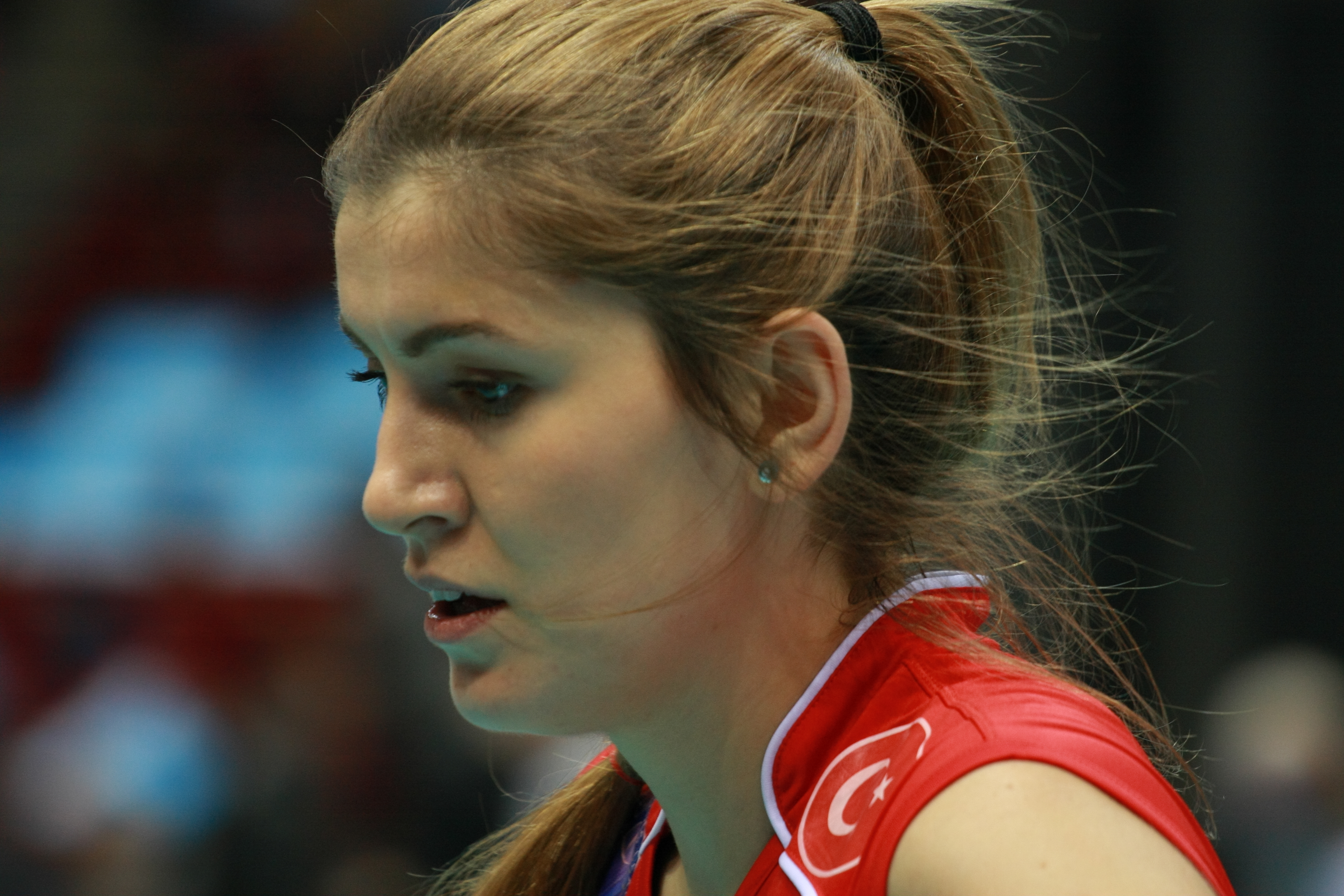

Personal information
- Born: May 11, 1988 (age 38) Bursa, Turkey
- Height: 1.82 m (5 ft 11 1/2 in)

Volleyball information
- Position: Setter
- Current club: Vakıfbank Spor Kulübü
- Number: 9

Tuğçe Hocaoğlu (born March 11, 1988, in Bursa, Turkey) is a Turkish female volleyball player. She is 182 cm (5.97 ft) tall and plays as a setter. She plays for Vakıfbank Spor Kulübü and wears the number 9.

== Clubs ==
- (Turkey) VakıfBank Güneş Sigorta Türk Telekom (2010– )

== Awards ==
=== Clubs ===
- 2012–13 Turkish Cup - Champion, with Vakıfbank Spor Kulübü
- 2012–13 CEV Champions League - Champion, with Vakıfbank Spor Kulübü
- 2012–13 Turkish Women's Volleyball League - Champion, with Vakıfbank Spor Kulübü

== See also ==
- Turkish women in sports
