= Carla Jenson =

American volleyball player (born 1990)

Personal information
- Nationality: American
- Born: July 21, 1990 (age 36)
- Height: 5 ft 11 in (180 cm)
- Weight: 150 lb (68 kg)
- Spike: 111 in (281 cm)
- Block: 110 in (279 cm)

Volleyball information
- Number: 1

Career
Years	Teams
2013	Iowa Ice

Carla Jenson (born July 21, 1990) is an American female volleyball player. With her club Iowa Ice she competed at the 2013 FIVB Volleyball Women's Club World Championship.
