= Laurel Abrahamson =

American volleyball player (born 1986)

Personal information
- Nationality: American
- Born: January 14, 1986 (age 40)
- Hometown: Bloomington, Minnesota
- Height: 6 ft 4 in (193 cm)
- Weight: 181 lb (82 kg)
- Spike: 120 in (305 cm)
- Block: 119 in (303 cm)

Volleyball information
- Number: 18

Career
Years	Teams
2013	Iowa Ice

Laurel Abrahamson (born January 14, 1986) is an American volleyball ex-player and current coach.

== Biography ==
=== Player ===
She competed at the 2013 FIVB Volleyball Women's Club World Championship with her club Iowa Ice.

=== Coach ===
Laurel has been coaching club volleyball and camps in California, Wisconsin and Minnesota since 2014. She has been coaching with Vital since 2021 and previously with Edina, M1 and coaching beach volleyball with EPVB.
