= Andrea Justine Landi =

American volleyball player (born 1988)

Personal information
- Born: March 2, 1988 (age 38); Coral Springs, Florida, U.S.
- Height: 6 ft 1 in (185 cm)
- Weight: 154 lb (70 kg)
- Spike: 120 in (304 cm)
- Block: 119 in (302 cm)

Volleyball information
- Number: 2

Career
| Years | Teams |
|---|---|
| 2013 | Iowa Ice |

Andrea Justine Landi (born March 2, 1988) is an American female volleyball player.

With her club Iowa Ice she competed at the 2013 FIVB Volleyball Women's Club World Championship.
