= Katarzyna Skowrońska-Dolata =

Polish volleyball player (born 1983)

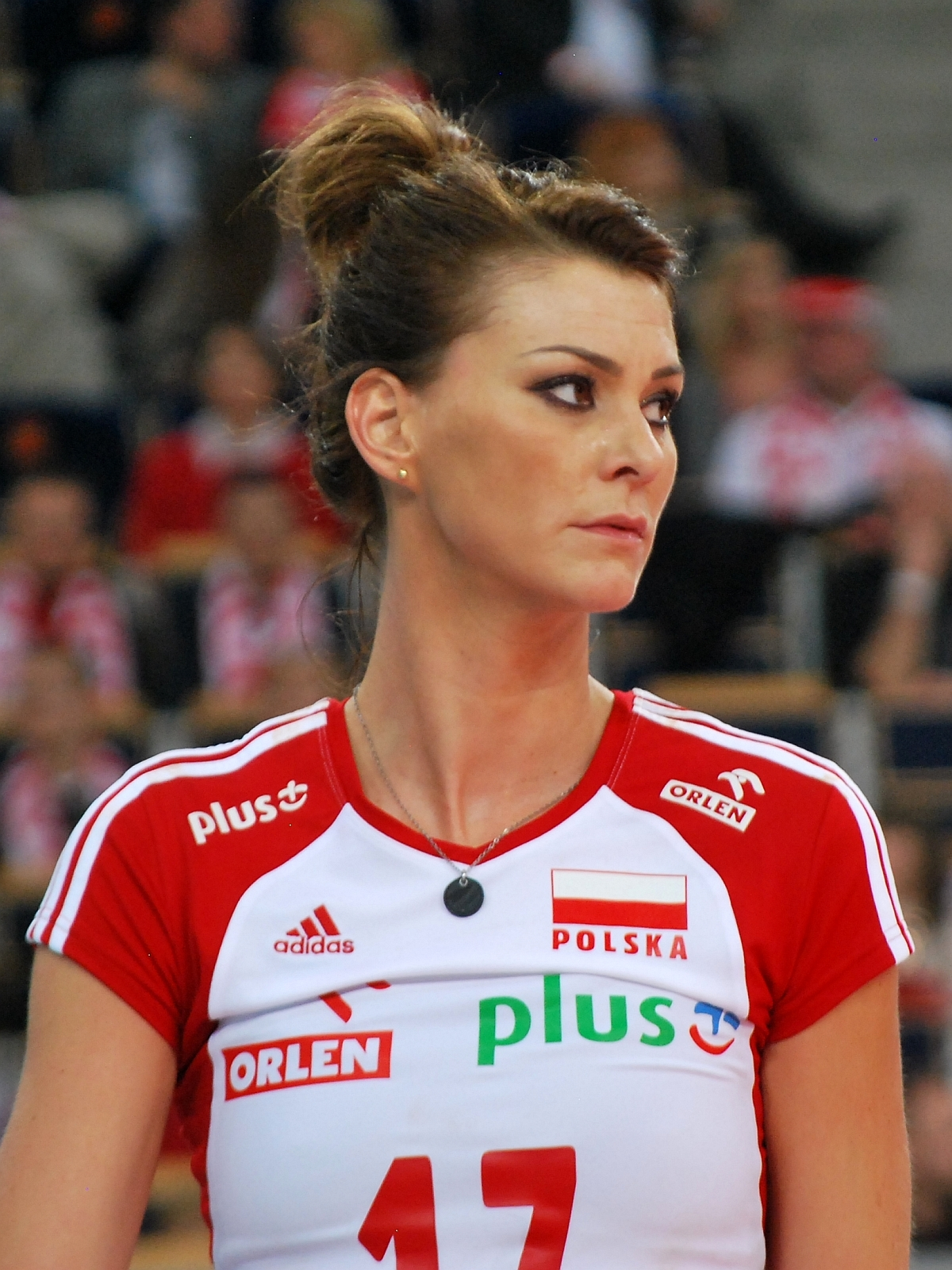

Personal information
- Full name: Katarzyna Ewa Skowrońska-Dolata
- Nickname: Kasia
- Nationality: Polish
- Born: June 30, 1983 (age 43); Warsaw, Poland
- Height: 1.89 m (6 ft 2 in)
- Weight: 75 kg (165 lb)
- Spike: 317 cm (125 in)
- Block: 302 cm (119 in)

Volleyball information
- Position: Opposite spiker / Wing spiker

Career
Years	Teams
1995–1998; 1998–2001; 2001–2003; 2003–2005; 2005–2006; 2006–2008; 2008–2010; 2010–2011; 2011–2013; 2013–2015; 2015–2016; 2016–2017; 2017–2019	(Poland) Skra Warszawa (Poland) SMS PZPS Sosnowiec (Poland) AZS AWF Danter Poznań (Poland) Nafta-Gaz Piła (Italy) Vicenza Volley (Italy) Asystel Novara (Italy) Scavolini Pesaro (Turkey) Fenerbahçe Istanbul (China) Guangdong Evergrande (Azerbaijan) Rabita Baku (Poland) Impel Wrocław (Italy) Foppapedretti Bergamo (Brazil) Hinode Barueri

National team
2003–2016	Poland
Honours
Representing Poland
Women's volleyball
European Championship
Gold medal – first place	2003 Turkey
Gold medal – first place	2005 Croatia
European Games
Silver medal – second place	2015 Baku
- Last updated: 14 May 2016

Katarzyna Ewa Skowrońska-Dolata (born 30 June 1983) is a Polish former volleyball player, a member of Poland women's national volleyball team and Italian club Foppapedretti Bergamo, double European Champion (2003, 2005), gold medalist of Italian, Turkish, Chinese and Azeri national championships.

== Personal life ==
Skowrońska was born in Warsaw, Poland. On June 17, 2006 she married Jakub Dolata, her manager.

== Early years ==
She became interested in volleyball as a teenager, after watching her brother play the sport. As a 15 year old Skowrońska went to the School of Sports Championship Polish Volleyball Federation in Sosnowiec and started to play as a middle blocker. Her first success when she was a student of this school was the gold medal of Cadet European Championship 1999 and Junior European Championship 2000.

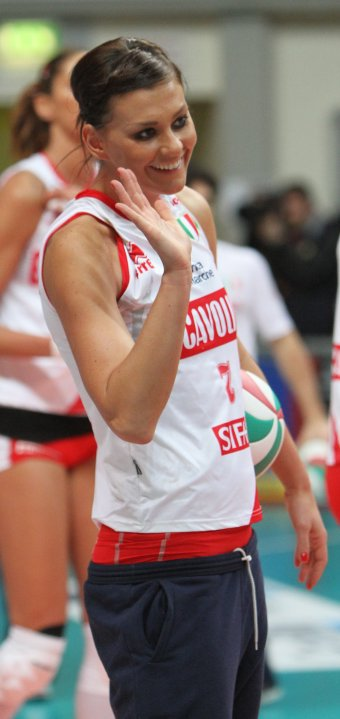
Skowrońska as a player of Scavolini Pesaro in 2010.

== Career ==
Skowrońska-Dolata began her career as an attacker at the club Skra Warszawa, where her coach was Teofil Czerwiński. In 2003 she debuted in the Polish national team. During her debut season she won the title of European Champion 2003 in Ankara, Turkey.

In 2001-2003, she was a player of AZS AWF Danter Poznań and won with this club a silver medal of Polish Championship in season 2002/2003. Then after two seasons 2003-2005 in Polish club Nafta-Gaz Piła and winning a bronze medal of Polish Championship 2004/2005 she moved to Italian League to Vicenza Volley, where spent season 2005/2006. In 2005 the Polish national team repeated its success from 2003 and Skowrońska won the second title of European Champion 2005 in Zagreb, Croatia. For her sport achievements, she received the Golden Cross of Merit in 2005 by Aleksander Kwaśniewski. In 2007 Skowrońska achieve a title of Best Scorer in FIVB World Cup despite the fact that Poland has not won a qualifications for the Olympic Games.

In the 2007-8 season she won a bronze medal in the CEV Champions League as well as the title of Best Scorer in the tournament alongside Asystel Novara. In 2008 she played at Olympic Games 2008. However the Polish women's national team was eliminated in the group stage. In 2008-2010 she played for the Italian side Scavolini Pesaro, a two-year period that was to prove amongst the most successful of her career. In 2008/2009 she won a SuperCup 2008, Italian Cup. She also won for the first time Italian Champion. In 2009/2010 she won the SuperCup 2009 and the Italian Champion for the second time.

At the end of the 2009/10 season, Skowrońska-Dolata moved to Turkish side Fenerbahçe Acıbadem Istanbul. Here Katarzyna won the 2010 FIVB World Club Championship, played in Doha, Qatar. She earned the Most Valuable Player and the Best Scorer awards. Skowrońska won the bronze medal with Fenerbahçe Acıbadem at the CEV Champions League 2010/2011. In the same season she won the title of Turkish Champion. In 2011 she moved to Chinese club - Guangdong Evergrande. With this club she won the title of Chinese Champion 2011/2012, silver medal of Chinese Championship 2012/2013 and Asian Club Championship 2013. In 2013 moved to Azeri Rabita Baku. She won the bronze medal of the CEV Champions League 2013/2014 after losing match (0-3) against Russian Dinamo Kazan in the semifinals, but defeating 3-0 to the Turkish Eczacıbaşı VitrA Istanbul in the third place match.

Skowrońska won a title of Azeri Champion 2013/2014 after winning match 3-0 against Baki-Azeryol and Skowrońska was Best Scorer and Most Valuable Player of the final series. In March 2014 Skowrońska-Dolata signed a new one-year contract with Rabita. In season 2013/2014 she achieved title of Azeri Champion and bronze medal of CEV Champions League.

In May 2015 she signed a contract with Polish club Impel Wrocław, making a return to the Polish league after a period of 10 years. She took part in 1st edition of European Games. Skowrońska-Dolata helped Poland beat Serbia in the semifinals, thereby qualifying for the tournaments final. On June 27, 2015 Poland was beaten by Turkey and Skowrońska-Dolata with her teammates achieved silver medal.

== Sporting achievements ==
=== CEV Champions League ===
- 2007/2008 - with Asystel Novara
- 2010/2011 - with Fenerbahçe Acıbadem Istanbul
- 2013/2014 - with Rabita Baku

=== FIVB Club World Championship ===
- Qatar 2010 - with Fenerbahçe Acıbadem Istanbul

=== Asian Club Championship ===
- 2013 Vietnam - with Guangdong Evergrande

=== National championships ===
- 2002/2003 Polish Championship, with AZS AWF Danter Poznań
- 2004/2005 Polish Championship, with Nafta-Gaz Piła
- 2008/2009 Italian SuperCup2008, with Scavolini Pesaro
- 2008/2009 Italian Cup, with Scavolini Pesaro
- 2008/2009 Italian Championship, with Scavolini Pesaro
- 2009/2010 Italian SuperCup2009, with Scavolini Pesaro
- 2009/2010 Italian Championship, with Scavolini Pesaro
- 2010/2011 Turkish SuperCup2010, with Fenerbahçe Acıbadem Istanbul
- 2010/2011 Turkish Championship, with Fenerbahçe Acıbadem Istanbul
- 2011/2012 Chinese Championship, with Guangdong Evergrande
- 2012/2013 Chinese Championship, with Guangdong Evergrande
- 2013/2014 Azeri Championship, with Rabita Baku
- 2014/2015 Azeri Championship, with Rabita Baku

=== National team ===
- 1999 CEV U18 European Championship
- 2000 CEV U20 European Championship
- 2003 CEV European Championship
- 2005 CEV European Championship
- 2015 European Games

=== Individually ===
- 2007 FIVB World Cup - Best Scorer
- 2008 CEV Champions League - Best Scorer
- 2010 FIVB World Club Championship - Best Scorer
- 2010 FIVB World Club Championship - Most Valuable Player
- 2012 Chinese Championship - Best Scorer
- 2013 Chinese Championship - Best Scorer
- 2014 Azeri Championship - Best Scorer
- 2014 Azeri Championship - Most Valuable Player

=== State awards ===
- 2005 Gold Cross of Merit

Awards
Preceded by (Poland) Małgorzata Glinka	Best Scorer of FIVB World Cup; 2007	Succeeded by (Dominican Republic) Bethania de la Cruz
Preceded by (Belgium) Virginie De Carne	Best Scorer of CEV Champions League; 2007/2008	Succeeded by (Russia) Ekaterina Gamova
Preceded by –	Best Scorer of FIVB World Club Championship; 2010	Succeeded by (Croatia) Nataša Osmokrović
Preceded by –	Most Valuable Player of FIVB World Club Championship; 2010	Succeeded by (Croatia) Nataša Osmokrović
