= Zhao Yun (volleyball) =

Chinese volleyball player

Personal information
- Full name: Zhao Yun
- Nickname: A Zhen (阿珍)
- Nationality: Chinese
- Born: 15 September 1981 (age 45) Nanjing, Jiangsu, China
- Home town: Nanjing, Jiangsu, China
- Height: 1.80 m (5 ft 11 in)
- Weight: 65 kg (143 lb)
- Spike: 310 cm (120 in)
- Block: 305 cm (120 in)

Volleyball information
- Position: Setter
- Current club: Guangdong Evergrande
- Number: 4

National team
- Years: Team
- 2005 2009: China
Honours
FIVB World Grand Prix
Bronze medal – third place	2005 Sendai	Team
- Updated on Jan 2012

Zhao Yun (Chinese: 趙雲; born 15 September 1981 in Nanjing, Jiangsu, China). She is the former China women's national volleyball team setter. She now plays for Guangdong Evergrande and has been appointed the team captain for the 2011-2012 season.

== Clubs ==
- (China) Jiangsu (2004–2009)
- (China) Guangdong Evergrande (2010-2013)

== Awards ==
=== Clubs ===
- 2006-2007 Chinese League - Bronze Medal, with Jiangsu
- 2008-2009 Chinese League - Bronze Medal, with Jiangsu
- 2010-2011 Chinese League - Runner-Up, with Guangdong Evergrande
- 2011-2012 Chinese League - Champion, with Guangdong Evergrande
