= Volleyball at the 2010 Asian Games =

- Venue: Guangyao Gymnasium; Zhongda Gymnasium; Guangwai Gymnasium; Guangzhou Gymnasium
- Dates: 13–27 November 2010
- Competitors: 346 from 21 nations

Volleyball at the 2010 Asian Games was held in Guangzhou, Guangdong, China from November 13 to 27, 2010. In this tournament, 18 teams played in the men's competition, and 11 teams participated in the women's competition. All matches were played at the Guangwai Gymnasium, the Guangyao Gymnasium and the Zhongda Gymnasium.

== Schedule ==
| P | Preliminary round | S | Second round | C | Classification | ¼ | Quarterfinals | ½ | Semifinals | F | Finals |

| Event↓/Date → | 13th Sat | 14th Sun | 15th Mon | 16th Tue | 17th Wed | 18th Thu | 19th Fri | 20th Sat | 21st Sun | 22nd Mon | 23rd Tue | 24th Wed | 25th Thu | 26th Fri | 27th Sat |
|---|---|---|---|---|---|---|---|---|---|---|---|---|---|---|---|
| Men | P | P | P | P | P | | S | S | ¼ | | C | ½ | | F | |
| Women | | | | | | P | P | P | P | P | | ¼ | ½ | | F |

== Medalists ==
| Event | Gold | Silver | Bronze |
|---|---|---|---|
| Men | Japan; Akio Nagae; Takeshi Nagano; Naoya Suga; Daisuke Usami; Yoshifumi Suzuki; Yuya Ageba; Takaaki Tomimatsu; Kota Yamamura; Kunihiro Shimizu; Tatsuya Fukuzawa; Yusuke Ishijima; Yuta Yoneyama | Iran; Adel Gholami; Mojtaba Attar; Saeid Marouf; Mohammad Mousavi; Hamzeh Zarini; Alireza Nadi; Mohsen Andalib; Farhad Nazari Afshar; Mehdi Mahdavi; Arash Keshavarzi; Mohammad Mohammadkazem; Arash Kamalvand | South Korea; Shin Young-soo; Han Sun-soo; Kwon Young-min; Moon Sung-min; Yeo Oh-hyun; Kim Hak-min; Kim Yo-han; Ko Hee-jin; Park Chul-woo; Suk Jin-wook; Ha Hyun-yong; Shin Yung-suk |
| Women | China; Wang Yimei; Zhang Lei; Yang Jie; Shen Jingsi; Zhou Suhong; Zhang Xian; Wei Qiuyue; Li Juan; Xu Yunli; Xue Ming; Chen Liyi; Ma Yunwen | South Korea; Oh Ji-young; Kim Sa-nee; Nam Jie-youn; Yim Myung-ok; Kim Yeon-koung; Han Yoo-mi; Han Song-yi; Jung Dae-young; Hwang Youn-joo; Kim Se-young; Lee So-ra; Yang Hyo-jin | Kazakhstan; Natalya Zhukova; Sana Jarlagassova; Olga Nassedkina; Olessya Arslanova; Korinna Ishimtseva; Irina Lukomskaya; Yelena Ezau; Marina Storozhenko; Yuliya Kutsko; Lyudmila Anarbayeva; Inna Matveyeva; Olga Drobyshevskaya |

== Medal table ==
| Rank | Nation | Gold | Silver | Bronze | Total |
|---|---|---|---|---|---|
| 1 | China (CHN) | 1 | 0 | 0 | 1 |
| 1 | Japan (JPN) | 1 | 0 | 0 | 1 |
| 3 | South Korea (KOR) | 0 | 1 | 1 | 2 |
| 4 | Iran (IRI) | 0 | 1 | 0 | 1 |
| 5 | Kazakhstan (KAZ) | 0 | 0 | 1 | 1 |
| Totals (5 entries) | | 2 | 2 | 2 | 6 |

== Draw ==
The draw ceremony for the team sports was held on 7 October 2010 at Guangzhou.

=== Men ===
The teams were distributed according to their position at the 2006 Asian Games using the serpentine system for their distribution.

Group A

- China (Host)
- Chinese Taipei (9)
- Thailand
- Pakistan

Group B

- South Korea (1)
- Kazakhstan (7)
- Vietnam
- India

Group C

- Saudi Arabia (3)
- Iran (6)
- Indonesia
- Turkmenistan
- Mongolia

Group D

- Qatar (4)
- Japan (5)
- Myanmar
- Athletes from Kuwait
- Hong Kong

=== Women ===
The teams were distributed according to their position at the 2006 Asian Games using the serpentine system for their distribution.

Group A

- China (Host)
- Thailand (4)
- South Korea (5)
- Tajikistan
- Mongolia

Group B

- Japan (2)
- Chinese Taipei (3)
- Kazakhstan (6)
- India
- Maldives
- North Korea

== Final standing ==
=== Men ===
| Rank | Team | Pld | W | L |
|---|---|---|---|---|
| 1st place, gold medalist(s) | Japan | 9 | 7 | 2 |
| 2nd place, silver medalist(s) | Iran | 9 | 8 | 1 |
| 3rd place, bronze medalist(s) | South Korea | 8 | 7 | 1 |
| 4 | Thailand | 8 | 4 | 4 |
| 5 | China | 8 | 6 | 2 |
| 6 | India | 8 | 5 | 3 |
| 7 | Saudi Arabia | 9 | 4 | 5 |
| 8 | Qatar | 9 | 3 | 6 |
| 9 | Kazakhstan | 7 | 5 | 2 |
| 10 | Pakistan | 7 | 4 | 3 |
| 11 | Chinese Taipei | 7 | 3 | 4 |
| 12 | Athletes from Kuwait | 8 | 3 | 5 |
| 13 | Indonesia | 8 | 4 | 4 |
| 14 | Myanmar | 8 | 3 | 5 |
| 15 | Turkmenistan | 8 | 2 | 6 |
| 16 | Vietnam | 7 | 0 | 7 |
| 17 | Hong Kong | 4 | 0 | 4 |
| 17 | Mongolia | 4 | 0 | 4 |

=== Women ===
| Rank | Team | Pld | W | L |
|---|---|---|---|---|
| 1st place, gold medalist(s) | China | 7 | 7 | 0 |
| 2nd place, silver medalist(s) | South Korea | 7 | 5 | 2 |
| 3rd place, bronze medalist(s) | Kazakhstan | 8 | 7 | 1 |
| 4 | North Korea | 8 | 5 | 3 |
| 5 | Thailand | 7 | 4 | 3 |
| 6 | Japan | 8 | 4 | 4 |
| 7 | Chinese Taipei | 8 | 3 | 5 |
| 8 | Mongolia | 7 | 1 | 6 |
| 9 | India | 6 | 2 | 4 |
| 10 | Maldives | 7 | 1 | 6 |
| 11 | Tajikistan | 5 | 0 | 5 |
