= Gözde =

- Gender: Female

Origin
- Language: Turkish
- Meaning: "Favorite", "Dearest"

Gözde is a common feminine Turkish given name. In Turkish, "Gözde" means "Favorite", and/or "Dearest".

== People ==
- Gözde Kırdar Sonsırma (born 1985), a Turkish volleyball player
- Gözde Yılmaz (born 1991), Turkish volleyball player
- Gözde Zay, Turkish fashion model
- Naşide Gözde Durmuş, Turkish scientist
