= Caitlin Mahoney =

American volleyball player (born 1990)

Personal information
- Nationality: American
- Born: January 2, 1990 (age 36)
- Height: 5 ft 10 in (178 cm)
- Weight: 154 lb (70 kg)
- Spike: 112 in (285 cm)
- Block: 112 in (284 cm)

Volleyball information
- Number: 7

Career
| Years | Teams |
|---|---|
| 2013 | Iowa Ice |

Caitlin Mahoney (born January 2, 1990) is an American female volleyball player.

With her club Iowa Ice she competed at the 2013 FIVB Volleyball Women's Club World Championship.
