= 2012–13 CEV Women's Champions League =

- League: CEV Women's Champions League
- Sport: Volleyball

Finals
- Champions: (Turkey) VakıfBank İstanbul
- Finals MVP: (Serbia) Jovana Brakočević

CEV Women's Champions League seasons
- ← 2011–12 2013–14 →

The CEV Champions League was the highest level of European club volleyball in the 2012–13 season and the 54th edition. It ran from 22 October 2012 until 11 March 2013.

Fenerbahçe were the winner of the previous year.

VakıfBank İstanbul won the title second time with a perfect 12–0 record by defeating Rabita Baku 3–0 in the final.

== Teams ==
The number of participants on the basis of ranking list for European Cup Competitions:

Rank	Country	Number of teams	Teams
1	Italy	3	Asystel Carnaghi Villa Cortese; Robur Tiboni Urbino; Unendo Yamamay Busto Arsizio
2	Turkey	3	Eczacıbaşı VitrA Istanbul; Galatasaray Daikin İstanbul; VakıfBank İstanbul
3	Russia	3	Dinamo Kazan; Dinamo Moscow; Uralochka-NTMK Yekaterinburg
4	France	2	ASPTT Mulhouse; RC Cannes
5	Poland	3	Atom Trefl Sopot; Bank BPS Fakro Muszyna; Tauron MKS Dąbrowa Górnicza
11	Germany	2	Dresdner SC; Schweriner SC
15	Azerbaijan	3	Azerrail Baku; Lokomotiv Baku; Rabita Baku
7	Serbia	1	Crvena Zvezda Beograd
8	Romania	2	2004 Tomis Constanța; Dinamo Romprest București
13	Switzerland	1	Voléro Zürich
19	Czech Republic	1	Agel Prostějov

== League round ==
24 teams were drawn to 6 pools of 4 teams each.
The 1st and 2nd ranked qualified for the Playoff 12
The organizer of the Final Four were determined after the end of the League Round and qualified directly for the Final Four.
The team of the organizer of the Final Four was replaced by the best 3rd ranked team with the best score.
The remaining 3rd placed and all 4th placed teams were eliminated.

=== Pool A ===
Pos	Team	Pld	W	L	Pts	SW	SL	SR	SPW	SPL	SPR
1	(Turkey) VakıfBank İstanbul	6	6	0	16	18	6	3.000	559	464	1.205
2	(France) RC Cannes	6	3	3	10	13	12	1.083	526	521	1.010
3	(Russia) Uralochka-NTMK Yekaterinburg	6	3	3	8	13	13	1.000	553	560	0.988
4	(Switzerland) Voléro Zürich	6	0	6	2	5	18	0.278	446	539	0.827

Date	Time		Score		Set 1	Set 2	Set 3	Set 4	Set 5	Total	Report
23 Oct	19:00	VakıfBank İstanbul (Turkey)	3–0	(Switzerland) Voléro Zürich	25–16	25–16	25–16			75–48	Report
24 Oct	20:30	RC Cannes (France)	2–3	(Russia) Uralochka-NTMK	25–20	23–25	20–25	27–25	7–15	102–110	Report
31 Oct	20:15	Voléro Zürich (Switzerland)	0–3	(France) RC Cannes	22–25	19–25	22–25			63–75	Report
1 Nov	18:00	Uralochka-NTMK (Russia)	1–3	(Turkey) VakıfBank İstanbul	23–25	25–22	24–26	13–25		85–98	Report
14 Nov	19:00	VakıfBank İstanbul (Turkey)	3–0	(France) RC Cannes	25–17	25–14	25–21			75–52	Report
14 Nov	20:15	Voléro Zürich (Switzerland)	2–3	(Russia) Uralochka-NTMK	25–21	25–23	21–25	17–25	9–15	97–109	Report
21 Nov	18:00	Uralochka-NTMK (Russia)	3–0	(Switzerland) Voléro Zürich	25–22	25–18	25–19			75–59	Report
21 Nov	20:30	RC Cannes (France)	2–3	(Turkey) VakıfBank İstanbul	25–22	25–16	20–25	15–25	11–15	96–103	Report
4 Dec	20:30	RC Cannes (France)	3–1	(Switzerland) Voléro Zürich	25–15	25–20	20–25	25–22		95–82	Report
5 Dec	19:00	VakıfBank İstanbul (Turkey)	3–1	(Russia) Uralochka-NTMK	25–20	23–25	25–20	25–21		98–86	Report
11 Dec	18:00	Uralochka-NTMK (Russia)	2–3	(France) RC Cannes	25–20	23–25	25–21	12–25	3–15	88–106	Report
11 Dec	20:15	Voléro Zürich (Switzerland)	2–3	(Turkey) VakıfBank İstanbul	26–24	21–25	18–25	25–21	7–15	97–110	Report

=== Pool B ===
Pos	Team	Pld	W	L	Pts	SW	SL	SR	SPW	SPL	SPR
1	(Azerbaijan) Rabita Baku	6	6	0	18	18	3	6.000	514	421	1.221
2	(Poland) Atom Trefl Sopot	6	3	3	9	11	9	1.222	463	440	1.052
3	(Italy) Asystel Carnaghi Villa Cortese	6	3	3	9	11	11	1.000	484	491	0.986
4	(Czech Republic) Agel Prostějov	6	0	6	0	1	18	0.056	365	474	0.770

Date	Time		Score		Set 1	Set 2	Set 3	Set 4	Set 5	Total	Report
24 Oct	20:30	Villa Cortese (Italy)	3–1	(Poland) Atom Trefl Sopot	25–16	26–24	21–25	25–23		97–88	Report
24 Oct	18:00	Agel Prostějov (Czech Republic)	0–3	(Azerbaijan) Rabita Baku	21–25	23–25	13–25			57–75	Report
30 Oct	18:00	Atom Trefl Sopot (Poland)	3–0	(Czech Republic) Agel Prostějov	26–24	25–17	25–16			76–57	Report
1 Nov	18:00	Rabita Baku (Azerbaijan)	3–1	(Italy) Villa Cortese	25–15	22–25	25–21	25–22		97–83	Report
13 Nov	18:00	Atom Trefl Sopot (Poland)	0–3	(Azerbaijan) Rabita Baku	19–25	22–25	25–27			66–77	Report
14 Nov	19:30	Villa Cortese (Italy)	3–1	(Czech Republic) Agel Prostějov	25–23	25–19	22–25	25–22		97–89	Report
21 Nov	18:00	Agel Prostějov (Czech Republic)	0–3	(Italy) Villa Cortese	15–25	18–25	19–25			52–75	Report
22 Nov	18:00	Rabita Baku (Azerbaijan)	3–1	(Poland) Atom Trefl Sopot	25–11	23–25	27–25	25–21		100–82	Report
5 Dec	18:00	Agel Prostějov (Czech Republic)	0–3	(Poland) Atom Trefl Sopot	15–25	16–25	24–26			55–76	Report
5 Dec	19:30	Villa Cortese (Italy)	1–3	(Azerbaijan) Rabita Baku	20–25	13–25	25–15	20–25		78–90	Report
11 Dec	17:00	Rabita Baku (Azerbaijan)	3–0	(Czech Republic) Agel Prostějov	25–17	25–23	25–15			75–55	Report
11 Dec	20:00	Atom Trefl Sopot (Poland)	3–0	(Italy) Villa Cortese	25–21	25–18	25–15			75–54	Report

=== Pool C ===
Pos	Team	Pld	W	L	Pts	SW	SL	SR	SPW	SPL	SPR
1	(Turkey) Galatasaray Daikin İstanbul	6	5	1	15	17	8	2.125	564	500	1.128
2	(Italy) Unendo Yamamay Busto Arsizio	6	4	2	13	15	8	1.875	526	485	1.085
3	(Romania) Dinamo Romprest București	6	2	4	5	9	15	0.600	493	528	0.934
4	(France) ASPTT Mulhouse	6	1	5	3	6	16	0.375	447	516	0.866

Date	Time		Score		Set 1	Set 2	Set 3	Set 4	Set 5	Total	Report
24 Oct	19:00	Dinamo București (Romania)	1–3	(Italy) Busto Arsizio	23–25	15–25	25–14	22–25		85–89	Report
25 Oct	18:00	Galatasaray (Turkey)	3–1	(France) Mulhouse	18–25	25–19	25–15	25–23		93–82	Report
30 Oct	19:00	Mulhouse (France)	3–1	(Romania) Dinamo București	25–23	25–12	23–25	25–15		98–75	Report
1 Nov	20:30	Busto Arsizio (Italy)	1–3	(Turkey) Galatasaray	19–25	25–20	22–25	20–25		86–95	Report
13 Nov	19:00	Mulhouse (France)	1–3	(Italy) Busto Arsizio	19–25	28–30	25–20	20–25		92–100	Report
15 Nov	19:30	Galatasaray (Turkey)	2–3	(Romania) Dinamo București	25–21	23–25	25–18	14–25	10–15	97–104	Report
20 Nov	19:00	Dinamo București (Romania)	1–3	(Turkey) Galatasaray	25–21	13–25	13–25	24–26		75–97	Report
22 Nov	20:30	Busto Arsizio (Italy)	3–0	(France) Mulhouse	25–13	25–20	25–17			75–50	Report
5 Dec	19:00	Dinamo București (Romania)	3–1	(France) Mulhouse	23–25	25–14	25–20	25–13		98–72	Report
6 Dec	20:30	Galatasaray (Turkey)	3–2	(Italy) Busto Arsizio	23–25	25–19	25–18	19–25	15–13	107–100	Report
11 Dec	19:00	Mulhouse (France)	0–3	(Turkey) Galatasaray	22–25	13–25	18–25			53–75	Report
11 Dec	20:30	Busto Arsizio (Italy)	3–0	(Romania) Dinamo București	25–21	26–24	25–11			76–56	Report

=== Pool D ===
Pos	Team	Pld	W	L	Pts	SW	SL	SR	SPW	SPL	SPR
1	(Turkey) Eczacıbaşı VitrA Istanbul	6	6	0	17	18	5	3.600	554	475	1.166
2	(Azerbaijan) Azerrail Baku	6	2	4	7	10	14	0.714	525	516	1.017
3	(Poland) Tauron MKS Dąbrowa Górnicza	6	2	4	6	11	14	0.786	536	559	0.959
4	(Germany) Dresdner SC	6	2	4	6	9	15	0.600	491	561	0.875

Date	Time		Score		Set 1	Set 2	Set 3	Set 4	Set 5	Total	Report
24 Oct	18:00	Azerrail Baku (Azerbaijan)	3–1	(Germany) Dresdner SC	23–25	25–14	25–14	25–17		98–70	Report
24 Oct	20:30	Dąbrowa Górnicza (Poland)	1–3	(Turkey) Eczacıbaşı VitrA	25–20	22–25	16–25	21–25		84–95	Report
31 Oct	17:00	Eczacıbaşı VitrA (Turkey)	3–0	(Azerbaijan) Azerrail Baku	25–22	25–23	25–12			75–57	Report
31 Oct	19:00	Dresdner SC (Germany)	3–2	(Poland) Dąbrowa Górnicza	25–21	19–25	26–24	21–25	15–12	106–107	Report
14 Nov	18:00	Azerrail Baku (Azerbaijan)	3–1	(Poland) Dąbrowa Górnicza	22–25	25–12	25–20	25–17		97–74	Report
14 Nov	19:00	Dresdner SC (Germany)	0–3	(Turkey) Eczacıbaşı VitrA	24–26	19–25	14–25			57–76	Report
20 Nov	19:00	Dąbrowa Górnicza (Poland)	3–2	(Azerbaijan) Azerrail Baku	18–25	20–25	25–10	25–23	15–13	103–96	Report
22 Nov	18:00	Eczacıbaşı VitrA (Turkey)	3–2	(Germany) Dresdner SC	23–25	25–18	23–25	25–22	15–12	111–102	Report
4 Dec	19:00	Dąbrowa Górnicza (Poland)	3–0	(Germany) Dresdner SC	27–25	25–17	25–23			77–65	Report
5 Dec	18:00	Azerrail Baku (Azerbaijan)	1–3	(Turkey) Eczacıbaşı VitrA	25–23	21–25	16–25	21–25		83–98	Report
11 Dec	17:00	Eczacıbaşı VitrA (Turkey)	3–1	(Poland) Dąbrowa Górnicza	23–25	26–24	25–19	26–24		100–92	Report
11 Dec	19:00	Dresdner SC (Germany)	3–1	(Azerbaijan) Azerrail Baku	26–24	25–23	15–25	25–22		91–94	Report

=== Pool E ===
Pos	Team	Pld	W	L	Pts	SW	SL	SR	SPW	SPL	SPR
1	(Russia) Dynamo Kazan	6	4	2	13	14	6	2.333	456	397	1.149
2	(Germany) Schweriner SC	6	4	2	12	15	8	1.875	523	457	1.144
3	(Romania) 2004 Tomis Constanța	6	3	3	7	9	14	0.643	474	511	0.928
4	(Italy) Robur Tiboni Urbino	6	1	5	4	6	16	0.375	435	512	0.850

Date	Time		Score		Set 1	Set 2	Set 3	Set 4	Set 5	Total	Report
23 Oct	20:30	Robur Urbino (Italy)	1–3	(Romania) Tomis Constanța	24–26	17–25	25–20	19–25		85–96	Report
24 Oct	19:00	Schweriner SC (Germany)	3–2	(Russia) Dynamo Kazan	21–25	25–14	25–23	21–25	15–13	107–100	Report
30 Oct	19:00	Tomis Constanța (Romania)	3–2	(Germany) Schweriner SC	25–11	29–27	16–25	21–25	17–15	108–103	Report
31 Oct	19:00	Dynamo Kazan (Russia)	3–0	(Italy) Robur Urbino	25–19	25–13	25–14			75–46	Report
13 Nov	20:30	Robur Urbino (Italy)	3–1	(Germany) Schweriner SC	25–20	25–22	21–25	25–16		96–83	Report
13 Nov	19:00	Tomis Constanța (Romania)	0–3	(Russia) Dynamo Kazan	15–25	12–25	18–25			45–75	Report
21 Nov	19:00	Dynamo Kazan (Russia)	3–0	(Romania) Tomis Constanța	26–24	25–19	25–17			76–60	Report
21 Nov	19:00	Schweriner SC (Germany)	3–0	(Italy) Robur Urbino	25–21	25–3	25–19			75–43	Report
4 Dec	20:30	Robur Urbino (Italy)	0–3	(Russia) Dynamo Kazan	26–28	21–25	17–25			64–78	Report
5 Dec	19:00	Schweriner SC (Germany)	3–0	(Romania) Tomis Constanța	25–22	25–23	25–15			75–60	Report
11 Dec	19:00	Dynamo Kazan (Russia)	0–3	(Germany) Schweriner SC	16–25	17–25	19–25			52–75	Report
11 Dec	19:00	Tomis Constanța (Romania)	3–2	(Italy) Robur Urbino	25–22	25–13	18–25	22–25	15–13	105–98	Report

=== Pool F ===
Pos	Team	Pld	W	L	Pts	SW	SL	SR	SPW	SPL	SPR
1	(Azerbaijan) Lokomotiv Baku	6	5	1	14	17	8	2.125	554	478	1.159
2	(Russia) Dynamo Moscow	6	5	1	12	15	11	1.364	573	528	1.085
3	(Poland) Bank BPS Fakro Muszyna	6	2	4	9	13	12	1.083	530	509	1.041
4	(Serbia) Crvena Zvezda Beograd	6	0	6	1	4	18	0.222	393	535	0.735

Date	Time		Score		Set 1	Set 2	Set 3	Set 4	Set 5	Total	Report
23 Oct	18:00	Crvena Zvezda (Serbia)	2–3	(Azerbaijan) Lokomotiv Baku	14–25	27–25	25–23	17–25	11–15	94–113	Report
24 Oct	19:00	Dynamo Moscow (Russia)	3–2	(Poland) Fakro Muszyna	24–26	25–21	25–18	20–25	15–12	109–102	Report
31 Oct	18:00	Lokomotiv Baku (Azerbaijan)	3–0	(Russia) Dynamo Moscow	25–20	25–18	25–13			75–51	Report
31 Oct	18:00	Fakro Muszyna (Poland)	3–0	(Serbia) Crvena Zvezda	25–13	25–15	25–15			75–43	Report
15 Nov	18:00	Fakro Muszyna (Poland)	1–3	(Azerbaijan) Lokomotiv Baku	20–25	25–11	17–25	15–25		77–86	Report
15 Nov	19:00	Dynamo Moscow (Russia)	3–1	(Serbia) Crvena Zvezda	25–13	25–17	23–25	25–14		98–69	Report
20 Nov	18:00	Crvena Zvezda (Serbia)	1–3	(Russia) Dynamo Moscow	26–24	18–25	16–25	20–25		80–99	Report
21 Nov	18:00	Lokomotiv Baku (Azerbaijan)	3–2	(Poland) Fakro Muszyna	25–22	22–25	25–19	20–25	15–6	107–97	Report
4 Dec	18:00	Crvena Zvezda (Serbia)	0–3	(Poland) Fakro Muszyna	19–25	17–25	20–25			56–75	Report
6 Dec	19:00	Dynamo Moscow (Russia)	3–2	(Azerbaijan) Lokomotiv Baku	22–25	21–25	25–14	25–22	15–12	108–98	Report
11 Dec	18:00	Fakro Muszyna (Poland)	2–3	(Russia) Dynamo Moscow	25–21	28–30	25–17	16–25	10–15	104–108	Report
11 Dec	20:00	Lokomotiv Baku (Azerbaijan)	3–0	(Serbia) Crvena Zvezda	25–21	25–13	25–17			75–51	Report

== Playoffs 12 ==
Group	Winners	Runners-up
A	(Turkey) VakıfBank İstanbul	(France) RC Cannes
B	(Azerbaijan) Rabita Baku	(Poland) Atom Trefl Sopot
C	(Turkey) Galatasaray Daikin İstanbul	(Italy) Unendo Yamamay Busto Arsizio
D	(Turkey) Eczacıbaşı VitrA Istanbul	(Azerbaijan) Azerrail Baku
E	(Russia) Dynamo Kazan	(Germany) Schweriner SC
F	(Azerbaijan) Lokomotiv Baku	(Russia) Dynamo Moscow
Best third ranked		(Italy) Asystel Carnaghi Villa Cortese

- All times are local time.
- In case of a tie – 1 match won & 1 match lost and not depending on the final score of both matches – the teams play a Golden Set to determine which one qualified for the Playoffs 6.

Team 1	Agg.	Team 2	1st leg	2nd leg
Atom Trefl Sopot (Poland)	0–2	(Turkey) VakıfBank İstanbul	1–3	0–3
Asystel Carnaghi Villa Cortese (Italy)	0–2	(Turkey) Eczacıbaşı VitrA Istanbul	1–3	2–3
RC Cannes (France)	0–2	(Azerbaijan) Rabita Baku	1–3	0–3
Dinamo Moscow (Russia)	0–2	(Russia) Dinamo Kazan	1–3	2–3
Schweriner SC (Germany)	1–1^{1}	(Italy) Unendo Yamamay Busto Arsizio	3–2	1–3
Azerrail Baku (Azerbaijan)	2–0	(Azerbaijan) Lokomotiv Baku	3–0	3–0

^{1} Unendo Yamamay Busto Arsizio won the golden set 15–10

=== First leg ===
Date	Time		Score		Set 1	Set 2	Set 3	Set 4	Set 5	Total	Report
16 Jan	18:00	Atom Trefl Sopot (Poland)	1–3	(Turkey) VakıfBank	25–23	18–25	15–25	21–25		79–98	Report
16 Jan	18:00	Azerrail Baku (Azerbaijan)	3–0	(Azerbaijan) Lokomotiv Baku	25–20	25–21	25–22			75–63	Report
16 Jan	19:00	Schweriner SC (Germany)	3–2	(Italy) Unendo Arsizio	11–25	25–22	25–17	13–25	15–13	89–102	Report
16 Jan	19:30	Dinamo Moscow (Russia)	1–3	(Russia) Dinamo Kazan	22–25	21–25	28–26	21–25		92–101	Report
16 Jan	20:30	RC Cannes (France)	1–3	(Azerbaijan) Rabita Baku	17–25	25–15	19–25	19–25		80–90	Report
17 Jan	20:30	Asystel Cortese (Italy)	1–3	(Turkey) Eczacıbaşı VitrA	23–25	25–21	29–31	17–25		94–102	Report

=== Second leg ===
Date	Time		Score		Set 1	Set 2	Set 3	Set 4	Set 5	Total	Report
23 Jan	18:00	Lokomotiv Baku (Azerbaijan)	0–3	(Azerbaijan) Azerrail Baku	20–25	18–25	22–25			60–75	Report
23 Jan	19:00	Dinamo Kazan (Russia)	3–2	(Russia) Dinamo Moscow	29–27	25–16	16–25	21–25	15–13	106–106	Report
24 Jan	16:30	Eczacıbaşı VitrA (Turkey)	3–2	(Italy) Asystel Cortese	25–20	15–25	25–17	15–25	15–9	95–96	Report
24 Jan	17:00	Rabita Baku (Azerbaijan)	3–0	(France) RC Cannes	25–19	25–18	25–17			75–54	Report
24 Jan	19:30	VakıfBank (Turkey)	3–0	(Poland) Atom Trefl Sopot	25–19	25–23	25–16			75–58	Report
24 Jan	20:30	Unendo Arsizio (Italy)	3–1	(Germany) Schweriner SC	25–23	25–21	18–25	25–18		93–87	Report

== Playoffs 6 ==
- All times are local time.
- In case of a tie – 1 match won & 1 match lost and not depending on the final score of both matches – the teams play a Golden Set to determine which one qualified for the Final Round.

Team 1	Agg.	Team 2	1st leg	2nd leg
VakıfBank İstanbul (Turkey)	2–0	(Turkey) Eczacıbaşı VitrA Istanbul	3–1	3–1
Rabita Baku (Azerbaijan)	2–0	(Russia) Dinamo Kazan	3–1	3–1
Unendo Yamamay Busto Arsizio (Italy)	^{1}1–1	(Azerbaijan) Azerrail Baku	3–2	0–3

^{1} Unendo Yamamay Busto Arsizio won the golden set 15–11

=== First leg ===
Date	Time		Score		Set 1	Set 2	Set 3	Set 4	Set 5	Total	Report
5 Feb	20:30	Unendo Arsizio (Italy)	3–2	(Azerbaijan) Azerrail Baku	25–17	16–25	20–25	25–23	15–8	101–98	Report
7 Feb	19:00	VakıfBank (Turkey)	3–1	(Turkey) Eczacıbaşı VitrA	25–23	23–25	25–17	25–15		98–80	Report
7 Feb	19:00	Dinamo Kazan (Russia)	1–3	(Azerbaijan) Rabita Baku	19–25	25–23	20–25	21–25		85–98	Report

=== Second leg ===
Date	Time		Score		Set 1	Set 2	Set 3	Set 4	Set 5	Total	Report
13 Feb	18:00	Azerrail Baku (Azerbaijan)	3–0	(Italy) Unendo Arsizio	25–23	25–18	25–21			75–62	Report
14 Feb	17:00	Rabita Baku (Azerbaijan)	3–1	(Russia) Dinamo Kazan	25–18	25–14	19–25	25–20		94–77	Report
14 Feb	17:00	Eczacıbaşı VitrA (Turkey)	1–3	(Turkey) VakıfBank	19–25	25–22	16–25	26–28		86–100	Report

== Final four ==
- Organizer: (Turkey) Galatasaray Daikin Istanbul
- Venue: TVF Burhan Felek Sport Hall Istanbul, Turkey

=== Bracket ===
Semifinals
9 March
(Turkey) Galatasaray Daikin	0
(Turkey) VakıfBank	3
9 March
(Azerbaijan) Rabita Baku	3
(Italy) Unendo Busto Arsizio	2

Final
10 March
(Turkey) VakıfBank	3
(Azerbaijan) Rabita Baku	0
Third place
10 March
(Turkey) Galatasaray Daikin	2
(Italy) Unendo Busto Arsizio	3

=== Semifinals ===
Date	Time		Score		Set 1	Set 2	Set 3	Set 4	Set 5	Total	Report
9 Mar	14:00	Rabita Baku (Azerbaijan)	3–2	(Italy) Unendo Busto	25–14	25–16	27–29	19–25	15–6	111–90	Report
9 Mar	17:00	Galatasaray (Turkey)	0–3	(Turkey) VakıfBank	26–28	17–25	21–25			64–78	Report

=== Third place ===
Date	Time		Score		Set 1	Set 2	Set 3	Set 4	Set 5	Total	Report
10 Mar	14:00	Galatasaray (Turkey)	2–3	(Italy) Unendo Busto	21–25	15–25	25–23	25–22	11–15	97–110	Report

=== Final ===
Date	Time		Score		Set 1	Set 2	Set 3	Set 4	Set 5	Total	Report
10 Mar	17:00	VakıfBank (Turkey)	3–0	(Azerbaijan) Rabita Baku	25–17	25–20	25–23			75–60	Report

== Final standing ==
Rank	Team
1st place, gold medalist(s)	(Turkey) VakıfBank
2nd place, silver medalist(s)	(Azerbaijan) Rabita Baku
3rd place, bronze medalist(s)	(Italy) Unendo Busto
4	(Turkey) Galatasaray

2012–13 Women's Club European Champions

2nd title

Roster for Final Four
Gözde Kırdar, Gizem Karadayı, Jovana Brakočević, Małgorzata Glinka, Melis Gürkaynak, Tuğçe Hocaoğlu, Güldeniz Önal, Bahar Toksoy, Christiane Fürst, Polen Uslupehlivan, Naz Aydemir and Saori Kimura
Head coach
Giovanni Guidetti

== Awards ==
Award	Winner	Team
MVP	(Serbia) Jovana Brakočević	(Turkey) VakıfBank
Best scorer	(Colombia) Madelaynne Montano	(Azerbaijan) Rabita Baku
Best setter	(Turkey) Naz Aydemir	(Turkey) VakıfBank
Best blocker	(Serbia) Nataša Krsmanović	(Azerbaijan) Rabita Baku
Best server	(Germany) Maren Brinker	(Italy) Unendo Busto
Best spiker	(Cuba) Rosir Calderon	(Turkey) Galatasaray
Best receiver	(Japan) Yuko Sano	(Turkey) Galatasaray
Best libero	(Turkey) Gizem Güreşen	(Turkey) VakıfBank
