= C.S. Volei 2004 Tomis Constanța =

Romanian volleyball club

2004 Tomis Constanța
- Full name: C.S. Volei 2004 Tomis Constanța
- Founded: 2004
- Ground: Sala Sporturilor (Capacity: 2,000)
- League: Divizia A1
- 2012–13: Divizia A1, 3rd
- Website: Club home page

C.S. Volei 2004 Tomis Constanța, commonly known as 2004 Tomis Constanța, was a professional women's volleyball club based in Constanța, Romania. It played in the 2012–13 CEV Women's Champions League season.

== Honours ==
=== National competitions ===
- Romanian Championship: 2

2010–11, 2011–12
Runner-up: 2009, 2010

- Romanian Cup: 1

2010–11

=== International competitions ===
- CEV Cup (Final-four)
  - Third (1): 2011–12

== Notable former players ==
- (Romania) Elena Butnaru
- (Romania) Claudia Gavrilescu
- (Romania) Cristina Cazacu
- (Romania) Diana Neaga-Calotă
- (Serbia) Jovana Vesović
- (Serbia) Maja Simanić
- (Serbia) Mira Topić
- (Serbia) Jasna Majstorović
- (Serbia) Nataša Ševarika
- (Croatia) Katarina Barun
- (Czech Republic) Ivana Plchotova
- (Bulgaria) Emiliya Nikolova
- (Belarus) Katsiaryna Zakreuskaya
- (Dominican Republic) Jeoselyna Rodríguez
- (Canada) Sherline Tasha Holness
- (United States) Meagan Ganzer

== See also ==
- C.V.M. Tomis Constanța (Men's team)
