= Carolina Costagrande =

Italian volleyball player (born 1980)

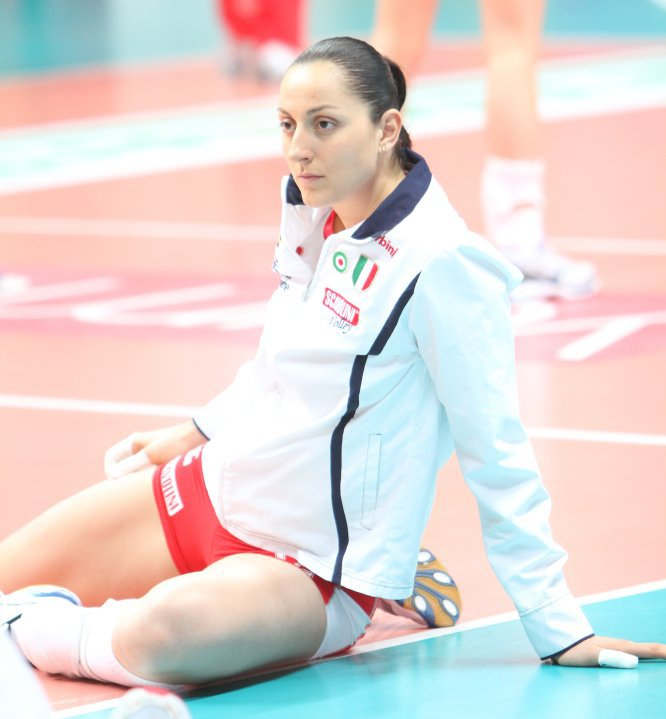

Personal information
- Full name: Carolina del Pilar Costagrande
- Nationality: Argentina - Italy
- Born: 15 October 1980 (age 46); El Trébol, Argentina
- Hometown: Pesaro, Italy
- Height: 1.87 m (6 ft 2 in)
- Weight: 80 kg (176 lb)
- Spike: 320 cm (126 in)
- Block: 310 cm (122 in)

Volleyball information
- Position: Wing Spiker
- Current club: (Poland) Impel Wroclaw
- Number: 18

National team
1999-2002; 2009-2015	Argentina; Italy
Honours
Women's volleyball
Representing Italy
World Cup
Gold medal – first place	2011 Japan	team
Representing Argentina
South American Championship
Silver medal – second place	1999 Valencia	team
Silver medal – second place	2001 Morón	team
- Last updated: February 2017

Carolina del Pilar Costagrande (born 15 October 1980 in El Trébol, Santa Fe, Argentina) is an Argentine born retired professional volleyball player who became a naturalized Italian. She played for Argentina between 1999-02 and has played for the Italian national team since 2009.

== Career ==
Costagrande won the gold medal at the 2013 Club World Championship playing with Vakıfbank Istanbul.

Costagrande won the silver medal in the 2013–14 CEV Champions League when her Turkish club VakıfBank İstanbul defeated 3–1 to Eczacıbaşı VitrA Istanbul in the semifinal but lost 0–3 to the Russian Dinamo Kazan in the Championship match. She was awarded tournament's Best Receiver.

She played with her national team at the 2014 World Championship. There her team ended up in fourth place after losing 2–3 to Brazil the bronze medal match.

== Clubs ==
- (Argentina) Club Trebolense (1995–1998)
- (Italy) Rio Marsì Palermo (1998–1999)
- (Italy) Brums Busto Arsizio (1999–2000)
- (Italy) Mirabilandia Teodora Ravenna (2000–2001)
- (Italy) Monte Schiavo Banca Marche Jesi 2001–2003
- (Italy) PinetaGuru Ravenna (2003–2004)
- (Italy) Infotel Europa Systems Forlì (2004–2005)
- (Italy) Scavolini Pesaro (2005–2010)
- (Russia) Dynamo Moscow (2010–2011)
- (China) Guangdong Evergrande (2011–2013)
- (Turkey) VakıfBank İstanbul (2013–2015)
- (Poland) Impel Wroclaw (2015–2016)
- (Italy) Imoco Volley Conegliano (2016–2018)

== Awards ==
=== Individuals ===
- 2011 World Cup "Most Valuable Player"
- 2013-14 CEV Champions League "Best Receiver"

=== Clubs ===
- 2005-06 CEV Cup - Champion, with Scavolini Pesaro
- 2006 Italian Supercup - Champion, with Scavolini Pesaro
- 2007 Italian Cup - Runner-Up, with Scavolini Pesaro
- 2007-08 Italian Championship - Champion, with Scavolini Pesaro
- 2007-08 Top Teams Cup - Champion, with Scavolini Pesaro
- 2008 Italian Supercup - Champion, with Scavolini Pesaro
- 2008 Italian Cup - Runner-Up, with Scavolini Pesaro
- 2008-09 Italian Championship - Champion, with Scavolini Pesaro
- 2009 Italian Supercup - Champion, with Scavolini Pesaro
- 2009 Italian Cup - Champion, with Scavolini Pesaro
- 2009-10 Italian Championship - Champion, with Scavolini Pesaro
- 2010–11 Russian Championship - Runner-Up, with Dynamo Moscow
- 2011-12 Chinese Championship - Champion, with Guangdong Evergrande
- 2012-13 Chinese Championship - Runner-Up, with Guangdong Evergrande
- 2013 Asian Club Championship - Champion, with Guangdong Evergrande
- 2013 Club World Championship - Champion, with Vakıfbank Istanbul
- 2013 Turkish Supercup - Champion, with VakıfBank İstanbul
- 2013-14 Turkish Women's Volleyball Cup - Champion, with VakıfBank İstanbul
- 2013–14 CEV Champions League - Runner-Up, with VakıfBank İstanbul
- 2013–14 Turkish Women's Volleyball League - Champion, with VakıfBank İstanbul
- 2014 Turkish Supercup - Champion, with VakıfBank İstanbul
- 2014–15 Turkish Women's Volleyball Cup - Runner-Up, with VakıfBank İstanbul
- 2014–15 CEV Champions League - Bronze medal, with VakıfBank İstanbul
- 2014–15 Turkish Women's Volleyball League - Runner-Up, with VakıfBank İstanbul
