= Shen Jingsi =

Chinese volleyball player

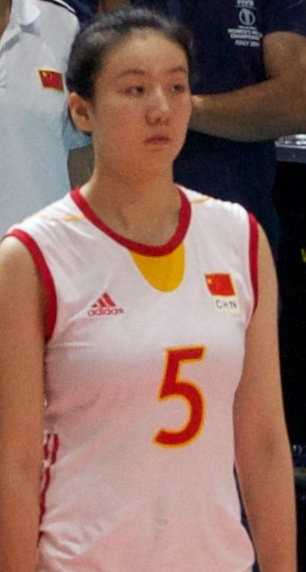
- Shen Jingsi in 2014

Personal information
- Full name: Shen Jingsi
- Nickname: Da Pang
- Nationality: Chinese
- Born: 3 May 1989 (age 37); Zhangzhou, Fujian, China
- Hometown: Zhangzhou, Fujian, China
- Height: 1.86 m (6 ft 1 in)
- Weight: 72 kg (159 lb)
- Spike: 310 cm (120 in)
- Block: 305 cm (120 in)

Volleyball information
- Position: Setter
- Current club: retired

Career
Years	Teams
2002–2013	Bayi
2013–2014	Guangdong Evergrande
2014–2018	Bayi

National team
2009–2010; 2013–2016	China
Honours
Women's volleyball
Representing China
World Championship
Silver medal – second place	2014 Italy	Team
Asian Games
Gold medal – first place	2010 Guangzhou	Team
Asian Championship
Silver medal – second place	2009 Hanoi	Team
Gold medal – first place	2015 Tianjin	Team
Asian Cup
Gold medal – first place	2010 Tai Cang	Team
Military World Games
Silver medal – second place	2011 Rio de Janeiro	Team
- Last updated: June 2024

Shen Jingsi (simplified Chinese: 沈静思; traditional Chinese: 沈靜思; born 3 May 1989 in Zhangzhou, Fujian) is a retired Chinese volleyball player. She was part of the gold medal winning team at the 2010 Asian Games.

== Career ==
Shen was the setter of China women's national volleyball team, and she joined the team go to the 2010 FIVB Women's World Championship which was held in Japan. She played in the Army club and was the captain of the team.

Shen played at the 2013 Club World Championship with Guangdong Evergrande, and she was selected Best Setter. Her team claimed the bronze medal, winning 3-1 against Voléro Zürich.

== Clubs ==
- (China) Bayi (2002-2013)
- (China) Guangdong Evergrande (2013-2014)
- (China) Bayi (2014-2018)

== Awards ==
=== Individuals ===
- 2013 FIVB Women's Club World Championship "Best Setter"

=== Clubs ===
- 2013 Club World Championship - Bronze medal, with Guangdong Evergrande
