= 2013 Asian Women's Club Volleyball Championship =

2013 Asian Club Championship
Tournament details
- Host country: Vietnam
- Dates: 29 April – 5 May
- Teams: 8
- Venue: 1 (in 1 host city)

Final positions
- Champions: (China) Guangdong Evergrande (1st title)

Tournament awards
- MVP: (China) Xu Yunli

The 2013 Asian Women's Club Volleyball Championship was the 14th staging of the AVC Club Championships. The tournament was held in Buôn Ma Thuột, Đắk Lắk Province, Vietnam.

== Pools composition ==
The teams are seeded based on their final ranking at the 2012 Asian Women's Club Volleyball Championship.

Pool B	Pool A
Vietnam (Host); Thailand (3rd); Kazakhstan; Chinese Taipei	China (1st); Japan (2nd); Iran; North Korea

== Preliminary round ==
=== Pool A ===
Pos	Team	Pld	W	L	Pts	SW	SL	SR	SPW	SPL	SPR	Qualification
1	(Kazakhstan) Zhetyssu Almaty	3	3	0	8	9	3	3.000	280	240	1.167	Quarterfinals
2	(Vietnam) Thông tin LienVietPostBank	3	2	1	5	8	7	1.143	328	326	1.006	Quarterfinals
3	Chinese Taipei	3	1	2	4	6	7	0.857	275	285	0.965	Quarterfinals
4	(Thailand) Idea Khonkaen	3	0	3	1	3	9	0.333	250	282	0.887	Quarterfinals

Date	Time		Score		Set 1	Set 2	Set 3	Set 4	Set 5	Total	Report
29 Apr	15:30	Zhetyssu Almaty (Kazakhstan)	3–1	Chinese Taipei	25–13	25–18	17–25	25–23		92–79	Report
29 Apr	19:00	Thông tin LVPB (Vietnam)	3–2	(Thailand) Idea Khonkaen	25–16	20–25	28–30	25–23	17–15	115–109	Report
30 Apr	13:30	Idea Khonkaen (Thailand)	1–3	Chinese Taipei	18–25	18–25	25–17	20–25		81–92	Report
30 Apr	15:30	Thông tin LVPB (Vietnam)	2–3	(Kazakhstan) Zhetyssu Almaty	25–27	25–23	25–23	16–25	10–15	101–113	Report
01 May	13:30	Zhetyssu Almaty (Kazakhstan)	3–0	(Thailand) Idea Khonkaen	25–20	25–18	25–22			75–60	Report
01 May	15:30	Chinese Taipei	2–3	(Vietnam) Thông tin LVPB	15–25	25–21	26–24	25–27	13–15	104–112	Report

=== Pool B ===
Pos	Team	Pld	W	L	Pts	SW	SL	SR	SPW	SPL	SPR	Qualification
1	(China) Guangdong Evergrande	3	3	0	9	9	0	MAX	225	133	1.692	Quarterfinals
2	(Japan) PFU BlueCats	3	2	1	6	6	3	2.000	193	160	1.206	Quarterfinals
3	(North Korea) Bo Tong Gang	3	1	2	3	3	6	0.500	175	201	0.871	Quarterfinals
4	(Iran) Giti Pasand Isfahan	3	0	3	0	0	9	0.000	126	225	0.560	Quarterfinals

Date	Time		Score		Set 1	Set 2	Set 3	Set 4	Set 5	Total	Report
29 Apr	13:30	Guangdong Evergrande (China)	3–0	(Iran) Giti Pasand Isfahan	25–5	25–14	25–17			75–36	Report
29 Apr	21:00	PFU BlueCats (Japan)	3–0	(North Korea) Bo Tong Gang	25–16	25–13	25–17			75–46	Report
30 Apr	18:00	Giti Pasand Isfahan (Iran)	0–3	(North Korea) Bo Tong Gang	17–25	16–25	18–25			51–75	Report
30 Apr	20:00	Guangdong Evergrande (China)	3–0	(Japan) PFU BlueCats	25–12	25–18	25–13			75–43	Report
01 May	18:00	PFU BlueCats (Japan)	3–0	(Iran) Giti Pasand Isfahan	25–19	25–12	25–8			75–39	Report
01 May	20:00	Bo Tong Gang (North Korea)	0–3	(China) Guangdong Evergrande	16–25	20–25	18–25			54–75	Report

== Final round ==
Quarterfinals
3 May – Buôn Ma Thuột
(China) Guangdong	3
(Thailand) Idea Khonkaen	0
3 May – Buôn Ma Thuột
(Vietnam) Thông tin LVPB	2
(North Korea) Bo Tong Gang	3
3 May – Buôn Ma Thuột
(Kazakhstan) Zhetyssu	3
(Iran) Giti Pasand	0
3 May – Buôn Ma Thuột
(Japan) PFU BlueCats	3
Chinese Taipei	0

Semifinals
4 May – Buôn Ma Thuột
(China) Guangdong	3
(North Korea) Bo Tong Gang	0
4 May – Buôn Ma Thuột
(Kazakhstan) Zhetyssu	3
(Japan) PFU BlueCats	2

Final
5 May – Buôn Ma Thuột
(China) Guangdong	3
(Kazakhstan) Zhetyssu	1
3rd place
5 May – Buôn Ma Thuột
(North Korea) Bo Tong Gang	0
(Japan) PFU BlueCats	3

5th–8th places
4 May – Buôn Ma Thuột
(Thailand) Idea Khonkaen	2
(Vietnam) Thông tin LVPB	3
4 May – Buôn Ma Thuột
(Iran) Giti Pasand	0
Chinese Taipei	3

5th place
5 May – Buôn Ma Thuột
(Vietnam) Thông tin LVPB	3
Chinese Taipei	0
7th place
5 May – Buôn Ma Thuột
(Thailand) Idea Khonkaen	3
(Iran) Giti Pasand	0

=== Quarterfinals ===
Date	Time		Score		Set 1	Set 2	Set 3	Set 4	Set 5	Total	Report
03 May	13:30	Zhetyssu Almaty (Kazakhstan)	3–0	(Iran) Giti Pasand Isfahan	25–7	25–14	25–9			75–30	Report
03 May	15:30	Guangdong Evergrande (China)	3–0	(Thailand) Idea Khonkaen	25–12	25–15	25–14			75–41	Report
03 May	18:00	PFU BlueCats (Japan)	3–0	Chinese Taipei	25–18	25–17	25–16			75–51	Report
03 May	20:00	Thông tin LVPB (Vietnam)	2–3	(North Korea) Bo Tong Gang	21–25	12–25	26–24	25–20	8–15	92–109	Report

=== 5th–8th semifinals ===
Date	Time		Score		Set 1	Set 2	Set 3	Set 4	Set 5	Total	Report
04 May	13:30	Giti Pasand Isfahan (Iran)	0–3	Chinese Taipei	13–25	23–25	17–25			53–75	Report
04 May	20:00	Idea Khonkaen (Thailand)	2–3	(Vietnam) Thông tin LVPB	9–25	25–22	25–17	16–25	16–18	91–107	Report

=== Semifinals ===
Date	Time		Score		Set 1	Set 2	Set 3	Set 4	Set 5	Total	Report
04 May	15:30	Guangdong Evergrande (China)	3–0	(North Korea) Bo Tong Gang	25–20	25–16	25–14			75–50	Report
04 May	18:00	Zhetyssu Almaty (Kazakhstan)	3–2	(Japan) PFU BlueCats	21–25	25–19	22–25	25–16	15–11	108–96	Report

=== 7th place ===
Date	Time		Score		Set 1	Set 2	Set 3	Set 4	Set 5	Total	Report
05 May	13:30	Idea Khonkaen (Thailand)	3–0	(Iran) Giti Pasand Isfahan	25–22	25–22	26–24			76–68	Report

=== 5th place ===
Date	Time		Score		Set 1	Set 2	Set 3	Set 4	Set 5	Total	Report
05 May	15:30	Thông tin LVPB (Vietnam)	3–0	Chinese Taipei	25–17	25–22	25–19			75–58	Report

=== 3rd place ===
Date	Time		Score		Set 1	Set 2	Set 3	Set 4	Set 5	Total	Report
05 May	18:00	Bo Tong Gang (North Korea)	0–3	(Japan) PFU BlueCats	17–25	22–25	22–25			61–75	Report

=== Final ===
Date	Time		Score		Set 1	Set 2	Set 3	Set 4	Set 5	Total	Report
05 May	20:00	Guangdong Evergrande (China)	3–1	(Kazakhstan) Zhetyssu Almaty	25–18	25–17	23–25	25–16		98–76	Report

== Final standing ==
Rank	Team
1st place, gold medalist(s)	(China) Guangdong Evergrande
2nd place, silver medalist(s)	(Kazakhstan) Zhetyssu Almaty
3rd place, bronze medalist(s)	(Japan) PFU BlueCats
4	(North Korea) Bo Tong Gang
5	(Vietnam) Thông tin LienVietPostBank
6	Chinese Taipei
7	(Thailand) Idea Khonkaen
8	(Iran) Giti Pasand Isfahan

Qualified for the 2013 Club World Championship

== Awards ==
- MVP: (China) Xu Yunli (Guangdong)
- Best scorer: (North Korea) Jong Jin-sim (Bo Tong Gang)
- Best spiker: (China) Zhou Yuan (Guangdong)
- Best blocker: (China) Xu Yunli (Guangdong)
- Best server: (China) Zhou Yuan (Guangdong)
- Best setter: (Kazakhstan) Korinna Ishimtseva (Zhetyssu)
- Best libero: (China) Zhang Xian (Guangdong)
