= Yang Jie (volleyball) =

Chinese volleyball player

Personal information
- Full name: Yang Jie
- Nationality: Chinese
- Born: 1 March 1994 (age 32) Hebei, China
- Home town: Shanghai, China
- Height: 1.94 m (6 ft 4 1/2 in)
- Weight: 72 kg (159 lb)
- Spike: 308 cm (121 in)
- Block: 300 cm (120 in)

Volleyball information
- Position: Outside hitter
- Current club: Shanghai
- Number: 3

Career
- Years: Team
- 2009 - present: Shanghai

National team
- Years: Team
- 2010 - 2013: China
Honours
Women's volleyball
Representing China
FIVB World Cup
Bronze medal – third place	2011 Japan	Team
Asian Games
Gold medal – first place	2010 Guangzhou	Team
Asian Championship
Gold medal – first place	2011 Taipei	Team
- Updated on Feb 2017

Yang Jie (simplified Chinese: 楊婕; traditional Chinese: 杨婕; pinyin: Yáng Jié; born 1 March 1994 in Hebei), she is the team member of China women's national volleyball team which position is opposite and outside hitter. She participated at the 2011 Montreux Volley Masters. and 2011 FIVB Volleyball Women's World Cup.

She's now plays for Shanghai. At Shanghai, she plays outside hitter.
