= Wang Ting (volleyball) =

Chinese volleyball player

Personal information
- Full name: Wang Ting
- Nickname: Ting Ting
- Nationality: Chinese
- Born: 9 November 1984 (age 41) Henan, China
- Home town: Henan, China
- Height: 1.88 m (6 ft 2 in)
- Weight: 68 kg (150 lb)
- Spike: 315 cm (124 in)
- Block: 305 cm (120 in)

Volleyball information
- Position: Middle Blocker
- Current club: Henan Zhengzhou Hi-tech dist.
- Number: 15

National team
- Years: Team
- 2005: China
Honours
Women's Volleyball
Representing China
FIVB World Grand Prix
Bronze medal – third place	2005 Sendai	Team
- Updated on December 2017

Wang Ting (Chinese: 王婷; born 9 November 1984). She is the former China women's national volleyball team Opposite. She transferred to Guangdong Evergrande club, and helped the team win their first title in 2011–2012 season.

== Career ==
Wang played at the 2013 Club World Championship with Guangdong Evergrande winning the bronze medal after defeating 3–1 to Voléro Zürich.

== Clubs ==
- (China) Henan Zhengzhou Hi-tech dist. (2002–2011, 2014–2017)
- (China) Guangdong Evergrande (2011–2014)

== Awards ==
=== Clubs ===
- 2005–2006 Chinese Volleyball League — Bronze Medal, with Guangdong Evergrande
- 2011–2012 Chinese Volleyball League — Champion, with Guangdong Evergrande
- 2013 Club World Championship – Bronze medal, with Guangdong Evergrande
