= Zhou Yuan =

Chinese volleyball player

Personal information
- Full name: Zhou Yuan
- Nationality: Chinese
- Born: 15 December 1982 (age 43) Handan, Hebei, China
- Home town: Handan, Hebei, China
- Height: 1.80 m (5 ft 11 in)
- Weight: 65 kg (143 lb)
- Spike: 317 cm (125 in)
- Block: 300 cm (120 in)

Volleyball information
- Position: Outside hitter
- Current club: Guangdong Evergrande
- Number: 9
- Updated on Jan 2012

Zhou Yuan (Chinese: 周媛; born 15 December 1982 in Handan) is a retired Chinese volleyball player who plays for Guangdong Evergrande.

== Clubs ==
- (China) Shandong (2000–2001)
- (China) Zhejiang (2001–2002)
- (China) Hebei (2002–2003)
- (China) Jiangsu (2003–2004)
- (China) Nanjing Force (2004–2005)
- (China) Bayi (Army) (2005)
- (China) Guangdong Evergrande (2009-2013)

== Awards ==
=== Individuals ===
- 2013 Asian Women's Club Volleyball Championship "Best spiker"
- 2013 Asian Women's Club Volleyball Championship "Best server"

=== Clubs ===
- 2010-2011 Chinese Volleyball League — Runner-up, with Guangdong Evergrande
- 2011-2012 Chinese Volleyball League — Champion, with Guangdong Evergrande
- 2013 Asian Club Championship - Champion, with Guangdong Evergrande
