= Suo (journal) =

- Discipline: Soil science
- Language: English, Swedish, Finnish
- Edited by: Sakari Sarkkola

Publication details
- History: 1950-present
- Publisher: Suoseura — Finnish Peatland Society (Finland)
- Open access: Yes
- License: CC BY-SA 4.0

Standard abbreviations
- ISO 4: Suo

Indexing
- ISSN: 0039-5471

Links
- Journal homepage

Suo is a peer-reviewed open access scholarly journal that publishes research articles on all aspects of mire and peat research, conservation and utilisation. It is published by Suoseura, the Finnish Peatland Society. The current editor-in-chief is Sakari Sarkkola.

== Abstracting and indexing ==
The journal is abstracted and indexed in:

- Scopus
- Biological Abstracts
- BIOSIS Previews
