= Inès Granvorka =

Swiss volleyball player (born 1991)

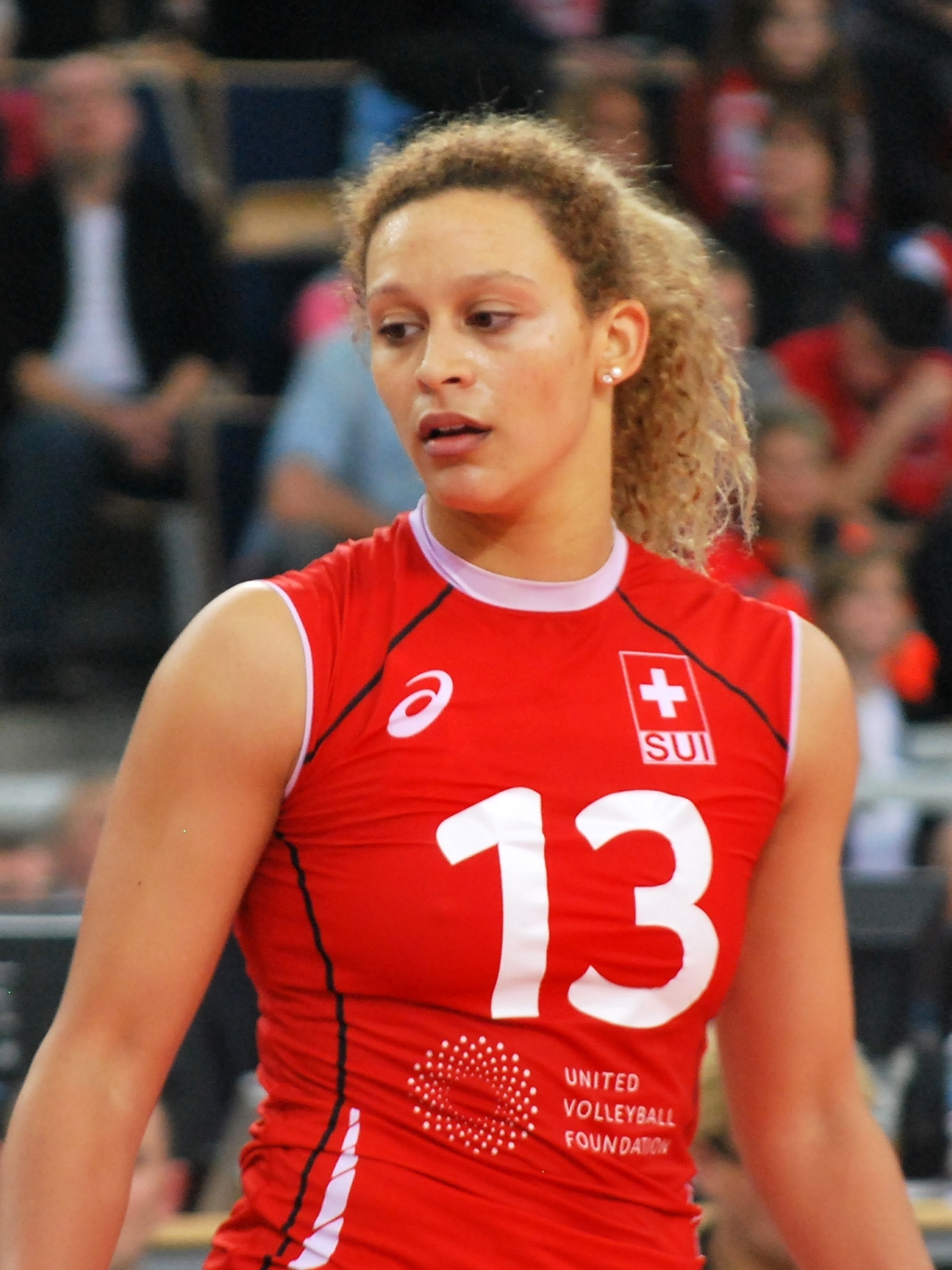
- Granvorka in 2014

Personal information
- Nationality: Swiss
- Born: 13 August 1991 (age 35)
- Height: 1.79 m (5 ft 10 in)
- Weight: 70 kg (154 lb)
- Spike: 303 cm (119 in)
- Block: 283 cm (111 in)

Career
| Years | Teams |
|---|---|
| 2010-2016 | Voléro Zürich |

Inès Granvorka (born 13 August 1991) is a Swiss volleyball player.

With her club Voléro Zürich she competed at the 2015 FIVB Volleyball Women's Club World Championship.

== Clubs ==
| Club | From | To |
|---|---|---|
| Switzerland VBC Cossonay | 2004-2005 | 2008-2009 |
| Switzerland VBC Cheseaux | 2009-2010 | 2009-2010 |
| Switzerland VBC Voléro Zurich | 2010-2011 | 2015-2016 |
| Switzerland TSV Guin | 2016-2017 | … |
