= Volley Pesaro =

- Full name: Volley Pesaro
- Founded: 1967
- Dissolved: 2018
- Ground: Padiglione D, Pesaro, Italy
- League: FIPAV Women's Serie A1
- Website: Club home page

Uniforms
Home	Away

Volley Pesaro was an Italian women's volleyball club based in Pesaro. The club won three Italian Serie A1 titles and two international titles.

== Previous names ==
Due to sponsorship, the club have competed under the following names:

- Fiam ITA Meta Pesaro (2000–2001)
- Vitrifrigo Fiam Italia Pesaro (2001–2003)
- Scavolini Pesaro (2003–2012)
- Robursport Volley Pesaro (2012–2013)
- myCicero Pesaro (2013–2017)
- myCicero Volley Pesaro (2017–2018)

== History ==
The club was founded in 1967 and progressed from regional competitions in the 1970s to the national leagues during the 1980s and 1990s. It reached Serie A1, the highest level of Italian women's volleyball, in 2003. Home games took place at the PalaCampanara and success soon followed, with the club winning its first major title, the CEV Challenge Cup in 2005–06. Since then, three successive Serie A1 titles, one Italian Cup, four Italian Supercups and a CEV Cup title were added in just four years. The club also played in five editions of the CEV Women's Champions League.

In 2013, the club withdrew from Serie A1 and, together with Snoopy Pallavolo, launched the Volley Pesaro project, which aimed to develop youth volleyball while maintaining activity at the senior level.

In 2017, the club returned to Serie A1 after winning promotion through the 2016–17 Serie A2 play-offs. However, in June 2018, after one season back in the top division, it announced its withdrawal from Serie A1 due to financial difficulties.

== Team ==
Season 2017–2018, as of September 2017.

Number	Player	Position	Height (m)	Weight (kg)	Birth date
1	(Montenegro) Tatjana Bokan	Outside hitter	1.86	72	9 April 1988 (age 38)
2	(Italy) Carlotta Cambi	Setter	1.76	66	28 May 1996 (age 30)
3	(Italy) Rossella Olivotto	Middle blocker	1.84		27 April 1991 (age 35)
5	(Argentina) Yamila Nizetich	Outside hitter	1.83	76	27 January 1989 (age 37)
7	(Italy) Alessia Ghilardi	Libero	1.63		5 May 1979 (age 47)
8	(Italy) Silvia Bussoli	Outside hitter	1.83		22 November 1993 (age 32)
9	(Belgium) Freya Aelbrecht	Middle blocker	1.89	74	10 February 1990 (age 36)
10	(Belgium) Lise Van Hecke	Opposite	1.92	70	1 July 1992 (age 34)
11	(Italy) Gloria Baldi	Opposite	1.85		31 May 1993 (age 33)
12	(Italy) Giulia Carraro	Setter	1.75	65	25 July 1994 (age 31)
16	(Italy) Alessia Arciprete	Outside hitter	1.80		6 September 1997 (age 28)
18	(Italy) Chiara Lapi	Middle blocker	1.82		3 March 1991 (age 35)

== Notable players ==
- (Brazil) Sheilla Castro (2004–2008)
- (Brazil) Marianne Steinbrecher (2006–2008)
- (Brazil) Jaqueline Carvalho (2008–2009)
- (Italy) Antonella Del Core (2003–2006)
- (Italy) Nadia Centoni (2003–2005)
- (Italy) Simona Rinieri (2004–2006)
- (Italy) Carolina Costagrande (2005–2010)
- (France) Kinga Maculewicz (2005–2007)
- (United States) Lindsey Berg (2004–2007)
- (Germany) Christiane Fürst (2007–2009)
- (Poland) Katarzyna Skowrońska (2008–2010)
- (Netherlands) Elke Wijnhoven (2007–2010)

== Honours ==
=== National competitions ===
- National League: 3

2007–08, 2008–09, 2009–10

- Coppa Italia: 1

2008–09

- Italian Super Cup: 4

2006, 2008, 2009, 2010

=== International competitions ===
- CEV Cup: 1

2007–08

- CEV Challenge Cup: 1

2005–06
