= Yin Meng =

Chinese volleyball player

Personal information
- Full name: Yin Meng
- Nickname: First sister （一姐）
- Nationality: chinese
- Born: 11 January 1984 (age 42) Shijiazhuang, Hebei, China
- Home town: Shijiazhuang, Hebei, China
- Height: 1.90 m (6 ft 3 in)
- Weight: 70 kg (150 lb)
- Spike: 320 cm (130 in)
- Block: 310 cm (120 in)

Volleyball information
- Position: Middle blocker
- Current club: Guangdong Evergrande
- Number: 10

National team
- Years: Team
- 2009: China
- Updated on June 2011

Yin Meng (Chinese: 尹萌; born 11 January 1984 in Shijiazhuang). She is retired middle blocker in the China national team.

== Career ==
She was awarded Most Valuable Player of German League and 2005 Junior U-20 World Championship. She signed with Guangzhou Evergrande in 2009.

== Clubs ==
- (China) Hebei (2001–2006)
- (Germany) Rote Raben Vilsbiburg (2006–2007)
- (China) Hebei (2007–2009)
- (China) Guangdong Evergrande (2009–2011)

== Awards ==
=== Individuals ===
- 2005 FIVB Junior World Championship "Best Spiker"
- 2005 FIVB Junior World Championship "Most Valuable Player"
- 2006-2007 German League B "Best Spiker"
- 2006-2007 German League B "Most Valuable Player"

=== Clubs ===
- 2009–10 Chinese League B — Champion, with Guangdong Evergrande
- 2010–11 Chinese League A — Runner-Up, with Guangdong Evergrande

=== National team ===
- 2009 Montreux Volley Masters - Bronze medal
