= Gözde Kırdar Bracceschi =

Turkish former volleyball player (born 1985)

Gözde Kırdar
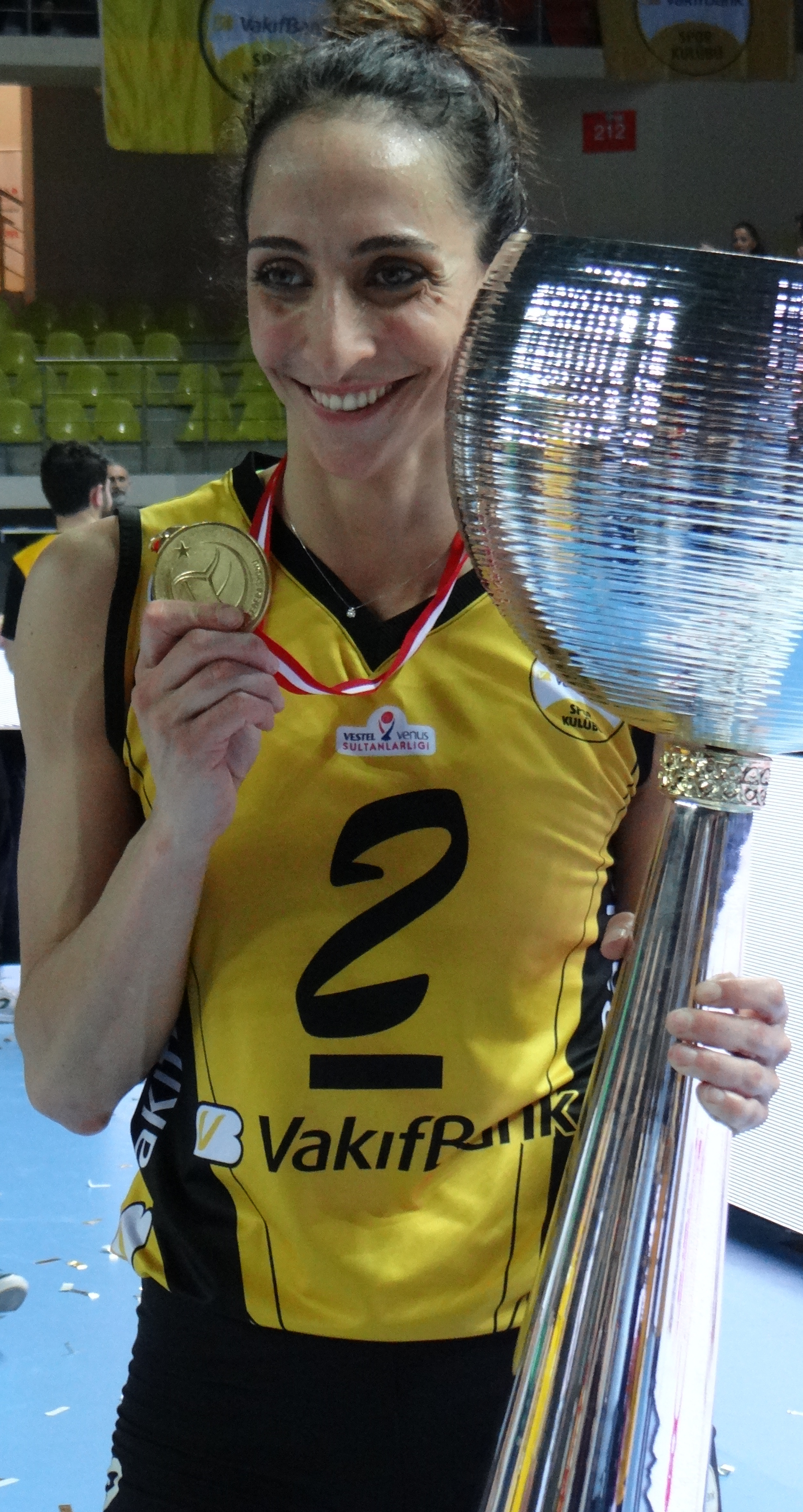

Personal information
- Nationality: Turkish
- Born: Gözde Kırdar; 26 June 1985 (age 41); Kütahya, Turkey
- Height: 1.83 m (6 ft 0 in)
- Weight: 70 kg (154 lb)
- Spike: 309 cm (122 in)
- Block: 300 cm (118 in)

Volleyball information
- Position: Outside hitter
- Current club: Vakıfbank Spor Kulübü
- Number: 2

Career
Years	Teams
1999–2018	Vakıfbank Spor Kulübü

National team
Turkey
Medal record
Women's volleyball
Representing Turkey
World Grand Prix
Bronze medal – third place	2012 Ningbo	Team
European Championships
Bronze medal – third place	2011 Italy/Serbia	Team
Bronze medal – third place	2017 Azerbaijan/Georgia	Team
Mediterranean Games
Gold medal – first place	2005 Almeria	Team
Silver medal – second place	2013 Mersin	Team

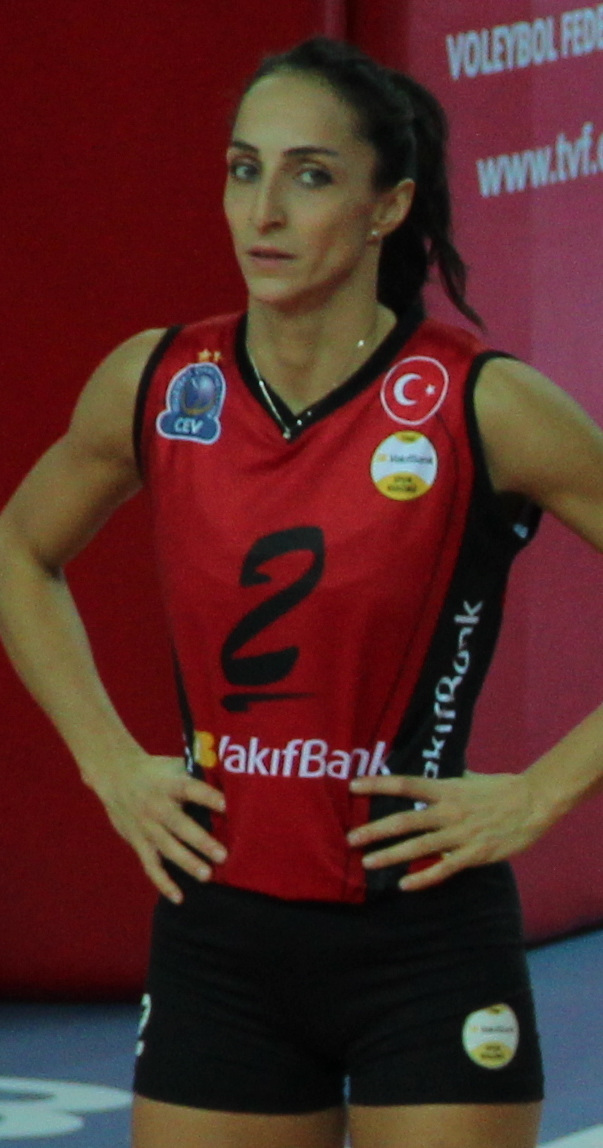
Gözde Sonsırma in 2016

Gözde Kırdar Bracceschi (née Kırdar; born 26 June 1985) is a retired Turkish volleyball player who played as an outside hitter for Vakıfbank Spor Kulübü and the Turkish national team.

== Personal life ==
Gözde is the twin sister of Eczacıbaşı VitrA setter Özge Kırdar. The Kirdar sisters played for Vakıfbank Spor Kulübü for years but Özge transferred to the rival side Eczacıbaşı VitrA in 2012. They are playing for national team together and both of them were the member of 2012 Summer Olympics squad of Turkey. Gozde is playing for Vakifbank Sport Club for 19 years. She is married to Olympic physical trainer Alessandro Bracceschi from Italy in 2017 She is graduated from Maltepe University. She is 183 cm (72 in).

== Career ==
She played for the national team at the 2003 FIVB Women's World Cup.

Kırdar won the gold medal and the Best Outside Hitter award at the 2013 Club World Championship playing with Vakıfbank Istanbul.

== Awards ==
=== Individuals ===
- CEV Champions League 2010–11 "Best receiver"
- 2012-13 Turkish League Final Series "Most valuable player"
- 2012-13 Turkish League Final Series "Best spiker"
- 2012-13 Turkish League Final Series "Best receiver"
- 2013 FIVB Women's Club World Championship "Best outside hitter"
- CEV Champions League 2017–18 "Most valuable player"

=== Clubs ===
- 2010–11 CEV Women's Champions League - Champion, with VakıfBank Güneş Sigorta Türk Telekom
- 2011 FIVB Women's Club World Championship - Runner-Up, with VakıfBank Türk Telekom
- 2011–12 Aroma Women's Volleyball League - Runner-Up, with Vakıfbank Spor Kulübü
- 2012–13 Turkish Cup - Champion, with Vakıfbank Spor Kulübü
- 2012–13 CEV Champions League - Champion, with Vakıfbank Spor Kulübü
- 2012–13 Turkish Women's Volleyball League - Champion, with Vakıfbank Spor Kulübü
- 2013 Club World Championship - Champion, with Vakıfbank Spor Kulübü
- 2016–17 CEV Champions League - Champion, with Vakıfbank Spor Kulübü
- 2017 FIVB Club World Championship - Champion, with Vakıfbank Spor Kulübü
- 2017–18 Turkish Women's Volleyball League - Champion, with Vakıfbank Spor Kulübü
- 2017–18 CEV Champions League - Champion, with Vakıfbank Spor Kulübü

=== National team ===
- 2011 European Championship - Bronze medal
- 2012 FIVB World Grand Prix - Bronze medal
- 2013 Mediterranean Games - Silver medal

== See also ==
- Turkish women in sports

Awards
Preceded by (Italy) Antonella Del Core	Best Receiver of CEV Champions League; 2010-11	Succeeded by (United States) Jordan Larson
Preceded by Not awarded	Best Outside Hitter of FIVB Club World Championship; 2013 ex aequo (Cuba) Kenia Carcaces	Succeeded by (Russia) Tatiana Kosheleva (Brazil) Fernanda Garay
Preceded by (China) Zhu Ting	Most Valuable Player of CEV Champions League; 2017-18	Succeeded by TBD
