= Jovana Brakočević =

Serbian volleyball player (born 1988)

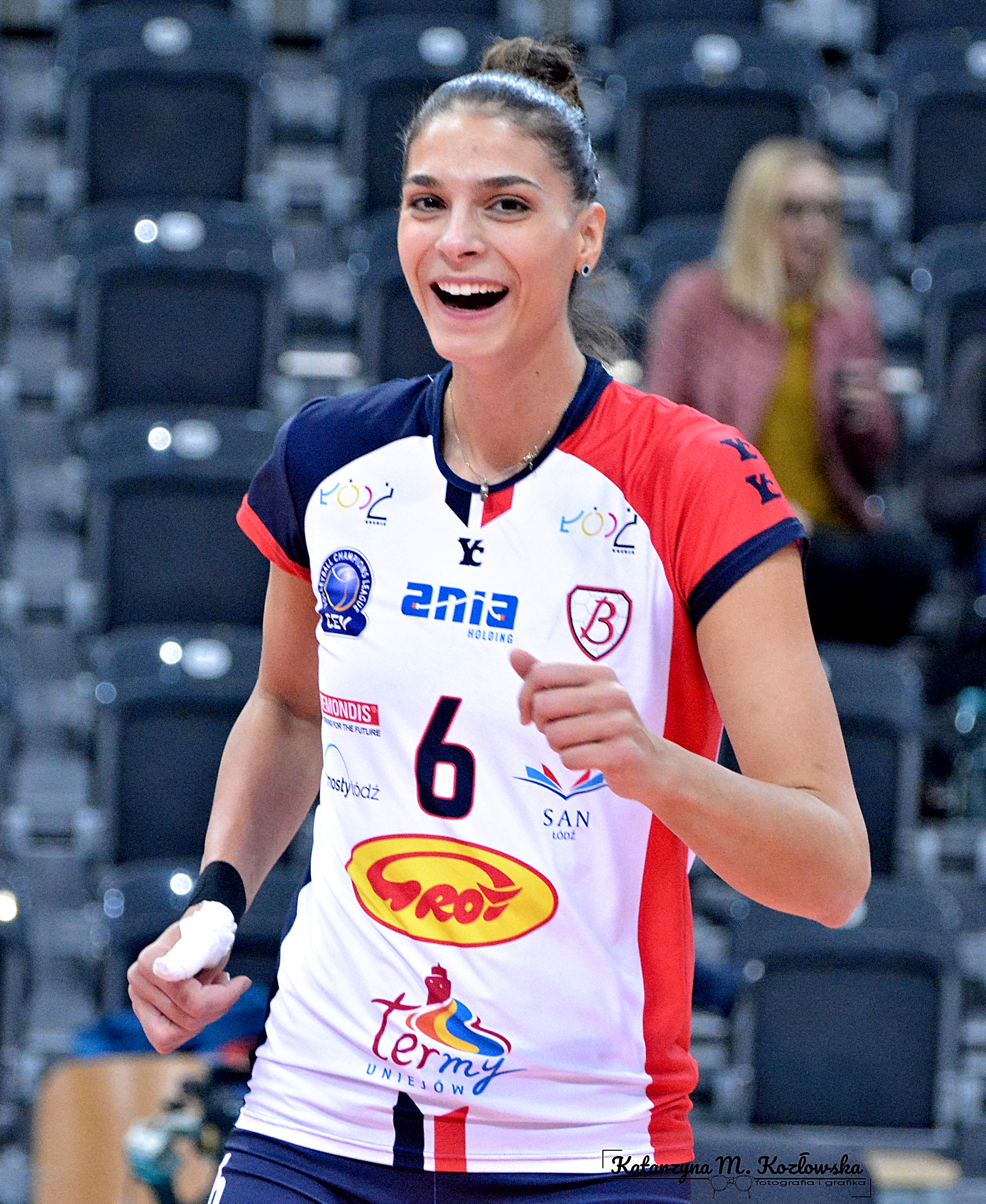
- Brakočević in 2018

Personal information
- Full name: Jovana Brakočević Canzian
- Nationality: Serbian
- Born: 5 March 1988 (age 38) Zrenjanin, SR Serbia, SFR Yugoslavia
- Height: 1.96 m (6 ft 5 in)
- Weight: 77 kg (170 lb)
- Spike: 319 cm (126 in)
- Block: 305 cm (120 in)

Volleyball information
- Position: Opposite spiker / Universal

Career
- Years: Team
- 2004–2007: Poštar 064
- 2007–2010: Spes Volley Conegliano
- 2010–2011: Guangzhou Evergrande
- 2011–2012: JT Marvelous
- 2012–2014: VakıfBank TT İstanbul
- 2014–2015: Azeryol Baku
- 2015–2017: Liu Jo Nordmeccanica Modena
- 2017–2018: Altay VC
- 2018: CSM Bucuresti
- 2018–2019: Budowlani Łódź
- 2019–2020: AGIL Volley
- 2020–2023: KPS Chemik Police
- 2023–2024: Beşiktaş
- 2024: Bandung BJB Tandamata

National team
- Years: Team
- 2006 2007–2016: Serbia and Montenegro; Serbia
Honours
Volleyball
Olympic Games
Silver medal – second place	2016 Rio de Janeiro	Team
World Championship
Bronze medal – third place	2006 Japan	Team
European Championships
Gold medal – first place	2011 Serbia/Italy
Silver medal – second place	2007 Belgium/Luxembourg
FIVB World Grand Prix
Bronze medal – third place	2011 Macau	Team
Bronze medal – third place	2013 Sapporo	Team
European League
Gold medal – first place	2010 Ankara
Gold medal – first place	2011 Istanbul
Bronze medal – third place	2012 Karlovy Vary
Universiade
Silver medal – second place	2009 Belgrade	Team

Jovana Brakočević Canzian (Serbian Cyrillic: Јована Бракочевић Канцијан; born 5 March 1988) is a Serbian volleyball player, who was a member of the Serbia women's national volleyball team that won the silver medal at the 2016 Summer Olympics, and also the silver medal at the 2007 European Championship in Belgium and Luxembourg. There she was named Best server of the tournament. She was also a member of the Serbia women's national volleyball team that won the gold medal at the 2011 European Championship in Serbia and Italy. There she was voted MVP of the tournament.

== Career ==
She played for Serbia at the 2008, 2012 and 2016 Summer Olympics, winning the silver medal in 2016. Jovana won the gold medal and the MVP and Best Spiker awards at the 2011 European League.

She played the 2010/2011 season for the Guangzhou Evergrande in the 361° Chinese Women's Volleyball League.

In June 2011, JT Marvelous announced her joining next season.

Brakočević won the gold medal at the 2013 Club World Championship and the Most Valuable Player award, playing with Vakıfbank Istanbul.

She retired as a professional volleyball player in 2026.

== Clubs ==
- (Serbia) Poštar 064 Belgrade (2004–2007)
- (Italy) Spes Volley Conegliano (2007–2010)
- (China) Guangdong Evergrande (2010–2011)
- (Japan) JT Marvelous (2011–2012)
- (Turkey) Vakıfbank Istanbul (2012–2014)
- (Azerbaijan) Azeryol Baku (2014–2015)
- (Italy) Liu Jo Nordmeccanica Modena (2016–2017)
- (Kazakhstan) Altay VC (2017)
- (Romania) CSM Bucuresti (2018)
- (Poland) Budowlani Łódź (2018–2019)
- (Italy) AGIL Volley (2019–2020)
- (Poland) KPS Chemik Police (2020–2023)
- (Turkey) Beşiktaş (2023–2024)
- (Indonesia) Bandung BJB Tandamata (2024)

== Awards ==
=== Individuals ===
- 2007 European Championship "Best server"
- 2007 Best Sportswoman of Vojvodina
- 2010 European League "Best spiker"
- 2010–11 Chinese Volleyball League "Most valuable player"
- 2011 European League "Most valuable player"
- 2011 European League "Best spiker"
- 2011 World Grand Prix "Best scorer"
- 2011 European Championship "Most valuable player"
- 2011 "Best Sportswoman" by Olympic Committee of Serbia
- 2011 Best Sportswoman of Vojvodina
- 2012–13 CEV Champions League "Most valuable player"
- 2012-13 Turkish League Final Series "Best scorer"
- 2013 World Grand Prix "Best opposite spiker"
- 2013 FIVB Club World Championship "Most valuable player"
- 2013 CEV European Championship best spiker

=== Clubs ===
- 2010-11 Chinese League Championship - Runner-Up, with Guangzhou Evergrande
- 2012-13 Turkish Cup - Champion, with Vakıfbank Spor Kulübü
- 2012–13 CEV Champions League - Champion, with Vakıfbank Spor Kulübü
- 2012-13 Turkish Women's Volleyball League - Champion, with Vakıfbank Spor Kulübü
- 2013 Club World Championship - Champion, with Vakıfbank Istanbul
- 2018 Romanian League - Champion, with CSM Bucuresti
- 2018-19 Polish Women's Volleyball League - Runner-up, with Budowlani Łódź
- 2020-21 Polish Women's Volleyball Cup - Champion, with KPS Chemik Police
- 2020-21 Polish Women's Volleyball League - Champion, with KPS Chemik Police
- 2021-22 Polish Women's Volleyball League - Champion, with KPS Chemik Police
- 2022-23 Polish Women's Volleyball Cup - Champion, with KPS Chemik Police

Awards
Preceded by (Netherlands) Manon Flier	Most Valuable Player of European Championship; 2011	Succeeded by (Russia) Tatiana Kosheleva
Preceded by (South Korea) Kim Yeon-Koung	Most Valuable Player of CEV Women's Champions League; 2012–13	Succeeded by (Russia) Ekaterina Gamova
Preceded by First Award	Best Opposite Spiker of FIVB World Grand Prix; 2013	Succeeded by (Brazil) Sheilla Castro
Preceded by (Brazil) Sheilla Castro	Most Valuable Player of FIVB Club World Championship; 2013	Succeeded by (Russia) Ekaterina Gamova
