= Suo Ma =

Chinese volleyball player

Personal information
- Full name: Suo Ma
- Nickname: Ge Ge(格格)
- Nationality: Chinese
- Born: 2 December 1979 (age 46); Beijing, China
- Hometown: Beijing, China
- Height: 1.87 m (6 ft 1 1/2 in)
- Weight: 70 kg (150 lb)
- Spike: 315 cm (124 in)
- Block: 305 cm (120 in)

Volleyball information
- Position: Middle Blocker
- Current club: Guangdong Evergrande
- Number: 3
Honours
Representing China
- Last updated: Jan 2012

Suo Ma (Chinese: 索瑪; born 2 December 1979 in Beijing) is a Chinese volleyball player, and now plays for Guangdong Evergrande.

== Career ==
Suo won the 2004 Asian Club Championship gold medal, playing with Bayi Yiyang High-Tech District.

== Clubs ==
- (China) Bayi (Army) (1999–2000
- (China) Nanjing Force (2000–2001)
- (China) Bayi (Army) (2001–2009)
- (China) Guangdong Jianlong (2009–2010)
- (China) Guangdong Evergrande (2010-)

== Awards ==
=== Clubs ===
- 1999-2000 Chinese Volleyball League - Bronze medal, with Bayi
- 2000-2001 Chinese Volleyball League - Runner-Up, with Nanjing Force
- 2001-2002 Chinese Volleyball League - Champion, with Bayi
- 2002-2003 Chinese Volleyball League - Runner-Up, with Bayi
- 2003-2004 Chinese Volleyball League - Runner-Up, with Bayi
- 2004-2005 Chinese Volleyball League - Runner-Up, with Bayi
- 2007-2008 Chinese Volleyball League - Runner-Up, with Bayi
- 2010-2011 Chinese Volleyball League - Runner-Up, with Guangdong Evergrande
- 2011-2012 Chinese Volleyball League - Champion, with Guangdong Evergrande
