= Guangdong Evergrande Volleyball Club (women) =

Chinese women's volleyball club

Guangdong Evergrande V.C.
- Full name: Guangdong Evergrande Women's Volleyball Club 廣東恆大女子排球俱樂部 广东恒大女子排球俱乐部
- Nickname: 廣東恆大女排
- Founded: 2009.4.24
- Ground: Shenzhen Sports Center, Shenzhen, Guangdong, China (Capacity: 5,000)
- Owner: Evergrande RE
- Head coach: Fang Yan (方岩)
- League: Chinese Volleyball League
- 2017–18: 8th

Uniforms
Home	Away

Guangdong Evergrande V.C. (simplified Chinese: 广东恒大女子排球俱乐部; traditional Chinese: 廣東恆大女子排球俱樂部) is a Chinese professional women's volleyball club, currently based in Shenzhen, Guangdong, founded in 2009 and sponsored by Evergrande Group. They are the winners of the bronze medal at the 2013 FIVB Women's Club World Championship and won one champion title of Chinese Volleyball League.

== History ==
Guangdong Evergrande Women's Volleyball Club is a professional women's volleyball club based in Guangzhou, Guangdong and play in the 361° Chinese Women's Volleyball League. The club was founded on April 24, 2009, and became the first professional volleyball club in China.

With 12 straight wins, they won the Chinese Women's Volleyball League Group B in 2009–2010 season and qualified to the Group A.

In the 2010–2011 season they played in the Chinese Women's Volleyball League Group A, in the semifinal, they got huge came back from 26 points down to defeat Shanghai, but they lost 2–3 to defending champion Tianjin Bridgestone in the finals.

During the 2011–2012 season, they defeated the defending champion in the semifinal, the first time Tianjin Bridgestone did not reach the finals in a decade. They won their first title on March 3, 2012, and became the 5th Champion team in Chinese Women's Volleyball League history.

Guangdong Evergrande played at the 2013 Club World Championship and claimed the bronze medal-winning 3–1 to Voléro Zürich. The team had Shen Jingsi named Best Setter.

In 2014, due to head coach Lang Ping resigning and the main sponsor Evergrande Group deciding to put more of their investment into football league, Guangdong Evergrande VC was demoted to Group B league of China because of the unsatisfactory result, for about two seasons.

In Season 2017/18, as the Group A league was expanded, Guangdong Evergrande VC returned to the Chinese Group A League.

== CVL results ==
Season	Final Standing
2010-2011	Runner-up
2011-2012	Champions
2012-2013	Runner-up
2013-2014	4th
2014-2015	12th
2015-2016	Group B
2016-2017	Group B
2017-2018	8th
2018-2019	7th
2019-2020	4th
2020-2021	4th

== Team Roster of Season 2020–2021 ==
Number	Player	Position	Height (m)	Birth date
1	(China) Chen Peiyan	Opposite	1.94	16/09/1999
2	(China) Li Yao	Wing-spiker	1.86	23/10/1995
3	(United States) Kelsey Robinson	Wing-spiker	1.88	25/07/1992
4	(China) Guo Junnan	Wing-spiker	1.87	08/02/1996
5	(Bulgaria) Dobriana Rabadžieva	Wing-spiker	1.87	14/06/1991
6	(China) Yu Jiarui	Setter	1.82	23/10/1997
7	(China) Xiong Xuehua	Libero	1.61	06/08/1997
8	(China) Wang Hongli	Middle Blocker	1.89	10/01/1994
9	(China) Tian Yue	Middle Blocker	1.87	15/09/1997
10	(China) Wang Min	Libero	1.78	14/05/1997
11	(China) Zhang Jiaxin	Middle Blocker	1.82	20/04/2000
12	(China) Gong Jing	Libero	1.79	02/02/1995
13	(China) Wang Xinyao	Middle Blocker	1.90	27/05/1995
14	(China) Yuan Weiyu	Wing-spiker	1.83	25/03/1995
15	(China) Zhang Fengmei	Middle Blocker	1.84	11/11/1997
18	(China) Xu Xiaoting	Setter	1.80	21/01/1998

- see also the Team Roster from past seasons

== Former players ==
Number	Player	Season	Transfer to
16	(Brazil) Fernanda Garay	2016–2017	(Russia) Dinamo Moscow
11	(United States) Kimberly Glass	2012–2013	(Brazil) Praia Clube
4	(China) Zhu Ting	2012–2013	(China) Henan Huawei
1	(Poland) Katarzyna Skowronska	2011–2013	(Azerbaijan) Rabita Baku
12	(Italy) Carolina Costagrande	2011–2013	(Turkey) Vakıfbank Spor Kulübü
5	(China) Wang Lina	2011–2012	Retired
15	(United States) Nicole Fawcett	2011–2012	(South Korea) Korea Expressway
18	(China) Wang Ting	2011–2012	(China) Henan Zhengzhou Hi-tech dist.
6	(Serbia) Jovana Brakočević	2010–2011	(Japan) JT Marvelous
13	(Thailand) Wilavan Apinyapong	2010–2011	(China) Fujian Xi Meng Bao
15	(United States) Logan Tom	2010–2011	(Turkey) Fenerbahçe Acıbadem
2	(China) Feng Kun	2009–2011	Retired
3	(China) Yang Hao	2009–2010	Retired
4	(United States) Christa Harmotto	2009–2010	(Italy) Universal Volley Femminile Modena
7	(China) Zhou Suhong	2009–2010	(China) Zhejiang New Century Tourism
12	(China) Yin Yin	2009–2010	Retired
15	(United States) Nicole Davis	2009–2010	(Azerbaijan) Lokomotiv Baku

== Achievements ==
- Chinese Volleyball League Group A :
  - Champion (1): 2011–2012
  - Runner-up (1): 2010–2011, 2012–2013
- Chinese Volleyball League Group B :
  - 1st place : 2009–2010 (Qualify for the Group A)
- FIVB Volleyball Women's Club World Championship:
  - 3rd place: 2013 FIVB Volleyball Women's Club World Championship

== Competitions ==
=== Chinese Volleyball League Group B ===
Season	Position	M-W	M-L	S-W	S-L	P-W	P-L
2009–2010	1st	12	0	36	4	981	655
Total	1/1	12	0	36	4	981	655
Ratio	100%	100%		9.000		1.498	

=== Chinese Volleyball League Group A ===
Season	Position	M-W	M-L	S-W	S-L	P-W	P-L
2010–2011	Silver medal	18	5	60	25	1919	1614
Ratio		78.26%		2.400		1.189	
2011–2012	Gold medal	20	2	61	17	1791	1599
Ratio		90.91%		3.588		1.120	
2012–2013	-	7	3	26	12	871	747
Ratio		70.00%		2.167		1.167	
2017–2018	8th						
Total	1/2	45	10	147	54	4581	3960
Ratio	50%	81.82%		2.722		1.157	

=== Club Records ===
Since 2009.11.28 the first time Participate the Chinese volleyball league. Correct as of 28 January 2012.

==== Team ====
- Record Longest streaks : 14 matches, during the 2011–2012 season (2011.12.20–2012.2.14)
- Record Most wins in one season : 20 matches, during the 2011–2012 season
- Record Most points win in one set : 25 – 5 V.S Henan Zhengzhou Hi-tech dist. 2011.3.1
- Record Fewest set points defeat in one set : 9 – 25 V.S Tianjin Bridgestone 2011.3.22

==== Player ====
- Record Most Starting line player:Yin Meng, 57 matches since 2009–2010 season
- Record Most Scorer :Zhou Yuan total got 510 Points
- Record Most Scorer in one season: Jovana Brakočević total got 427 Points during the 2010–2011 season
- Record Most Spike Scorer in one season: Katarzyna Skowrońska total got 358 Points during the 2011–2012 season
- Record Most Block Scorer in one season: Suo Ma total got 58 Points during the 2010–2011 season
- Record Most Serve Scorer in one season: Logan Tom total got 35 Points during the 2010–2011 season

==== Season Best ====
Season	Best Spiker	Best Blocker	Best Server	Best Scorer
2009–2010	(China) Zhou Suhong	(United States) Christa Harmotto	(China) Zhou Suhong	(United States) Christa Harmotto
Points	115	40	17	148
2010–2011	(Serbia) Jovana Brakočević	(China) Suo Ma	(United States) Logan Tom	(Serbia) Jovana Brakočević
Points	356	58	35	427
2011–2012	(Poland) Katarzyna Skowrońska	(Italy) Carolina Costagrande	(Poland) Katarzyna Skowrońska	(Poland) Katarzyna Skowrońska
Points	358	33	22	398
2012–2013	-	-	-	-
Points	-	-	-	-

==== Best Scorer History ====
Rank	Player	Spike	Block	Serve	Total	Season	Average
1	(China) Zhou Yuan	453	21	36	510	3	170
2	(China) Yin Meng	325	99	41	465	3	155
3	(Serbia) Jovana Brakočević	356	39	32	427	1	427
4	(Poland) Katarzyna Skowrońska	358	18	22	398	1	398
5	(Italy) Carolina Costagrande	309	33	15	357	1	357
6	(United States) Logan Tom	254	32	35	321	1	321
7	(United States) Christa Harmotto	106	40	2	148	1	148
8	(China) Suo Ma	172	88	35	295	2	147.5
9	(China) Zhou Suhong	115	8	17	140	1	140
10	(China) Feng Kun	66	27	23	116	2	58

- only show the top 10 players, see also the other ranked player
