= 2013 FIVB Volleyball Women's Club World Championship =

2013 Women's Club World Championship
Tournament details
- Host country: Switzerland
- Dates: 9–13 October
- Teams: 6
- Venue: Saalsporthalle (in Zürich host cities)

Final positions
- Champions: (Turkey) Vakıfbank Istanbul (1st title)

Tournament awards
- MVP: (Serbia) Jovana Brakočević (Vakıfbank Istanbul)

The 2013 FIVB Women's Club World Championship was the 7th edition of the event. It was held in Zürich, Switzerland, from 9 to 13 October 2013. Vakıfbank Istanbul won the title and Jovana Brakočević was named Most Valuable Player.

== Qualification ==
Team	Qualified as
(Switzerland) Voléro Zürich	Hosts
Kenya Prisons	2013 African Champions
(China) Guangdong Evergrande	2013 Asian Champions
(United States) Iowa Ice	2013 NORCECA Representatives
(Brazil) Unilever Vôlei	2013 South American Champions
(Turkey) Vakıfbank Istanbul	2013 European Champions

== Pools composition ==
Pool A	Pool B
(China) Guangdong Evergrande; Kenya Prisons (Switzerland) Voléro Zürich	(United States) Iowa Ice (Brazil) Unilever Vôlei (Turkey) Vakıfbank Istanbul

== Venue ==
All rounds
(Switzerland) Zürich
Saalsporthalle
Capacity: 2,300
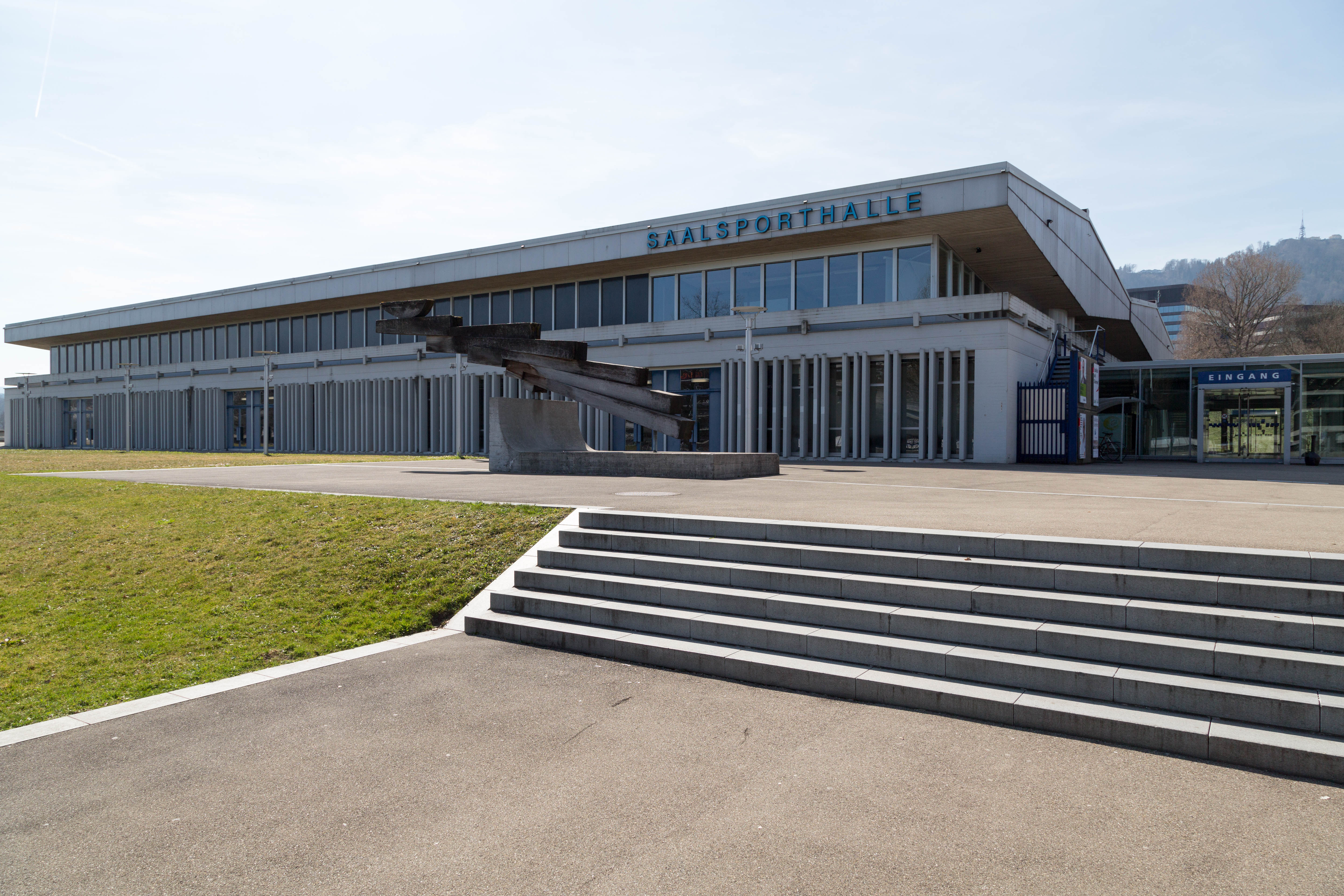

== Pool standing procedure ==
Match won 3–0 or 3–1: 3 points for the winner, 0 points for the loser
Match won 3–2: 2 points for the winner, 1 point for the loser
In case of tie, the teams will be classified according to the following criteria:
number of matches won, sets ratio and points ratio

== Preliminary round ==
- All times are Central European Summer Time (UTC+2).

=== Pool A ===
Pos	Team	Pld	W	L	Pts	SW	SL	SR	SPW	SPL	SPR	Qualification
1	(Switzerland) Voléro Zürich	2	2	0	6	6	1	6.000	180	133	1.353	Semifinals
2	(China) Guangdong Evergrande	2	1	1	3	4	3	1.333	172	143	1.203	Semifinals
3	Kenya Prisons	2	0	2	0	0	6	0.000	74	150	0.493	

Date	Time		Score		Set 1	Set 2	Set 3	Set 4	Set 5	Total	Report
Oct 9	20:30	Guangdong Evergrande (China)	3–0	Kenya Prisons	25–14	25–11	25–13			75–38	P2 P3
Oct 10	20:30	Voléro Zürich (Switzerland)	3–1	(China) Guangdong Evergrande	26–24	25–21	29–31	25–21		105–97	P2 P3
Oct 11	17:30	Voléro Zürich (Switzerland)	3–0	Kenya Prisons	25–17	25–13	25–6			75–36	P2 P3

=== Pool B ===
Pos	Team	Pld	W	L	Pts	SW	SL	SR	SPW	SPL	SPR	Qualification
1	(Turkey) Vakıfbank Istanbul	2	2	0	6	6	1	6.000	171	126	1.357	Semifinals
2	(Brazil) Unilever Vôlei	2	1	1	3	4	3	1.333	156	148	1.054	Semifinals
3	(United States) Iowa Ice	2	0	2	0	0	6	0.000	97	150	0.647	

Date	Time		Score		Set 1	Set 2	Set 3	Set 4	Set 5	Total	Report
Oct 9	17:30	Unilever Vôlei (Brazil)	3–0	(United States) Iowa Ice	25–14	25–16	25–22			75–52	P2 P3
Oct 10	17:30	Vakıfbank Istanbul (Turkey)	3–0	(United States) Iowa Ice	25–16	25–12	25–17			75–45	P2 P3
Oct 11	20:30	Unilever Vôlei (Brazil)	1–3	(Turkey) Vakıfbank Istanbul	20–25	18–25	25–21	18–25		81–96	P2 P3

== Final round ==
- All times are Central European Summer Time (UTC+2).

=== Bracket ===
Semifinals
October 12 – Zürich
(Turkey) Vakıfbank Istanbul	3
(China) Guangdong Evergrande	0
October 12 – Zürich
(Switzerland) Voléro Zürich	0
(Brazil) Unilever Vôlei	3

Final
October 13 – Zürich
(Turkey) Vakıfbank Istanbul	3
(Brazil) Unilever Vôlei	0
3rd place
October 13 – Zürich
(China) Guangdong Evergrande	3
(Switzerland) Voléro Zürich	1

=== Semifinals ===
Date	Time		Score		Set 1	Set 2	Set 3	Set 4	Set 5	Total	Report
Oct 12	15:10	Vakıfbank Istanbul (Turkey)	3–0	(China) Guangdong Evergrande	28–26	25–15	25–20			78–61	P2 P3
Oct 12	18:10	Voléro Zürich (Switzerland)	0–3	(Brazil) Unilever Vôlei	23–25	20–25	16–25			59–75	P2 P3

=== 3rd place ===
Date	Time		Score		Set 1	Set 2	Set 3	Set 4	Set 5	Total	Report
Oct 13	14:10	Guangdong Evergrande (China)	3–1	(Switzerland) Voléro Zürich	24–26	25–23	25–18	25–21		99–88	P2 P3

=== Final ===
Date	Time		Score		Set 1	Set 2	Set 3	Set 4	Set 5	Total	Report
Oct 13	17:10	Vakıfbank Istanbul (Turkey)	3–0	(Brazil) Unilever Vôlei	25–23	27–25	25–16			77–64	P2 P3

== Final standing ==
Rank	Team
1st place, gold medalist(s)	(Turkey) Vakıfbank Istanbul
2nd place, silver medalist(s)	(Brazil) Unilever Vôlei
3rd place, bronze medalist(s)	(China) Guangdong Evergrande
4	(Switzerland) Voléro Zürich
5	(United States) Iowa Ice
5	Kenya Prisons

2013 Women's Club World Champions

1st title

Team roster
Gözde Kırdar Sonsırma (c), Gizem Güreşen, Kübra Akman, Jovana Brakočević, Güldeniz Önal, Bahar Toksoy, Jelena Nikolić, Christiane Fürst, Çağla Akın, Polen Uslupehlivan, Naz Aydemir, Carolina Costagrande
Head coach
Giovanni Guidetti

== Awards ==
- Most valuable player
  (Serbia) Jovana Brakočević ( (Turkey) Vakıfbank Istanbul)
- Best opposite spiker
  (Canada) Sarah Pavan ( (Brazil) Unilever Vôlei)
- Best Outside Hitters
  (Cuba) Kenia Carcaces ( (Switzerland) Voléro Zürich)
  (Turkey) Gözde Kırdar Sonsırma ( (Turkey) Vakıfbank Istanbul)
- Best Middle Blockers
  (Germany) Christiane Fürst ( (Turkey) Vakıfbank Istanbul)
  (Brazil) Carol ( (Brazil) Unilever Vôlei)
- Best setter
  (China) Shen Jingsi ( (China) Guangdong Evergrande)
- Best libero
  (Japan) Yuko Sano ( (Switzerland) Voléro Zürich)
