= AVC Women's Volleyball Champions League =

Asian women's club volleyball tournament

- Most recent season or competition: 2026 AVC Women's Volleyball Champions League
- Formerly: AVC Cup Women's Club Tournament (1999–2002); Asian Women's Club Volleyball Championship (2004–2024)
- Founded: 1999; 27 years ago
- First season: 1999
- Organizing body: AVC
- No. of teams: 12
- Continents: Asia and Oceania
- Most recent champion: (Japan) NEC Red Rockets Kawasaki (2026)
- Most titles: (China) Tianjin Bohai Bank (5 titles)
- Qualification: FIVB Women's Volleyball Club World Championship
- Streaming partner: Volleyball TV
- Website: asianvolleyball.net

The AVC Women's Champions League, previously the AVC Cup Women's Club Tournament (between 1999 and 2002) and Asian Women's Club Volleyball Championship (between 2004 and 2024), is an annual continental club volleyball competition organized by the Asian Volleyball Confederation (AVC), the sport's continental governing body. The competition was first contested in Thailand in 1999. It was not held in 2003 and 2020 due to 2002–2004 SARS outbreak and COVID-19 pandemic respectively.

For a long time, the winner of the Asian Women's Club Volleyball Championship qualifies for the FIVB Volleyball Women's Club World Championship. Starting in 2024, the restructured qualification now allows the two finalists to directly qualify in the world tournament.

Starting from the 2025 edition, the tournament is rebranded and will be known as the AVC Women's Volleyball Champions League.

Tianjin Bohai Bank holds the record for most victories, winning the competition five times. China's teams have won the tournament eight times, the most for any nation. The current Asian club champions are Zhetysu VC from Kazakhstan, who defeated VTV Bình Điền Long An from Vietnam (3–1) in the final of the 2025 edition.

== History ==
The competition began in 1999 when the Asian Volleyball Confederation (AVC) announced the establishment of the first official men's and women's club championships, to be held under its supervision. The tournament was initially known as the AVC Cup Women's Club Volleyball Tournament for its first four editions, before being renamed the Asian Women's Club Volleyball Championship in 2004.

The first three editions was played in a round-robin format. In 2002, the competition adopted a two-round system: a preliminary round (featuring a pool round, from which the top four teams advanced) followed by a final round (consisting of semi-finals and a final). From 2004 to 2007, the tournament reverted to a round-robin format. From 2008 to 2021, the tournament followed a similar format, with the final stage included quarter-finals, semi-finals, and a final (except in 2016, when the tournament had a three-round system: a preliminary round, a classification round, and a final round). In 2022, a round-robin preliminary round had been adopted, with a final round consisting of just two matches (a third place match and a final). From 2023 up to now, the same format as from 2008 to 2021 has been followed, with little difference in 2023 when there are no quarter-finals in the final stage.

Starting with the 2025 edition, the tournament will be rebranded as the AVC Women's Volleyball Champions League.

== Competition formula ==
=== Qualification ===
The tournament features a maximum of 12 participating teams, with the host country automatically qualifying. The host nation is permitted to field up to two teams in the competition. Other teams will qualify through the designated qualification pathway established for that particular year.

For the 2025 edition, all remaining participating teams were granted entry by invitation only.

=== Final tournament ===
The tournament consists of two rounds: a preliminary round (pool phase) and a final round (direct elimination phase). During the preliminary round, the 12 qualified teams are divided into four pools—labeled A through D—each containing three teams. Within each pool, teams compete in a round-robin format, with each team playing against the other two teams once. Following the pool phase, the top two teams from each pool advance to the final round, which includes the quarter-finals, semi-finals, and the final match.

=== Prize money ===
The teams advancing to the semifinals of this competition will be awarded a total prize of US$50,000 by the Asian Volleyball Confederation (AVC). This marks the first time that a prize has been introduced in an AVC event in 2025.

- Champions: US$20,000
- Runners-up: US$15,000
- Third place: US$10,000
- Fourth place: US$5,000

== Results ==
=== Finals ===
Year	Host	Final			Third place match			Teams
Year	Host	Champions	Score	Runners-up	3rd place	Score	4th place	Teams
1999; Details	(Thailand); Ubon Ratchathani	(South Korea); Caltex	Round-robin	(Thailand); Aero Thai	(China); Shanghai	Round-robin	(Kazakhstan); Alma Dinamo	6
2000; Details	(China); Shaoxing	(China); Shanghai	Round-robin	(Japan); NEC Red Rockets	(China); Zhejiang	Round-robin	(South Korea); Hyundai	6
2001; Details	(Vietnam); Ho Chi Minh City	(China); Shanghai	Round-robin	(Japan); Hisamitsu Springs	(Thailand); Aero Thai	Round-robin	(Kazakhstan); Rahat	8
2002; Details	(Thailand); Bangkok	(Japan); Hisamitsu Springs	3–0	(Thailand); BEC World	(Kazakhstan); Rahat	3–1	(China); Shanghai	8
2004; Details	(Kazakhstan); Almaty	(Kazakhstan); Rahat	Round-robin	(China); Ba'Yi	(Chinese Taipei); Chung Shan	Round-robin	(Kazakhstan); Astana	6
2005; Details	(Vietnam); Ninh Bình	(China); Tianjin	Round-robin	(Chinese Taipei); Chung Shan	(South Korea); Korea Expressway	Round-robin	(Kazakhstan); Rahat	7
2006; Details	(Philippines); Manila	(China); Tianjin	Round-robin	(Chinese Taipei); Chung Shan	(Thailand); Sang Som	Round-robin	(Kazakhstan); Rahat	7
2007; Details	(Vietnam); Vĩnh Phúc	(Kazakhstan); Rahat	Round-robin	(Thailand); Sang Som	(Japan); Hisamitsu Springs	Round-robin	(North Korea); Sobaeksu	7
2008; Details	(Vietnam); Vĩnh Phúc	(China); Tianjin	3–2	(Thailand); Sang Som	(Japan); Toray Arrows	3–2	(North Korea); Sobaeksu	8
2009; Details	(Thailand); Nakhon Pathom	(Thailand); Federbrau	3–2	(China); Tianjin	(Japan); Toray Arrows	3–2	(Kazakhstan); Zhetysu	11
2010; Details	(Indonesia); Gresik	(Thailand); Federbrau	3–1	(Kazakhstan); Zhetysu	(Japan); JT Marvelous	3–2	(China); Tianjin	10
2011; Details	(Vietnam); Vĩnh Phúc	(Thailand); Chang	3–0	(China); Tianjin	(Kazakhstan); Zhetysu	3–0	(Vietnam); Thông tin	8
2012; Details	(Thailand); Nakhon Ratchasima	(China); Tianjin	3–2	(Japan); Toray Arrows	(Thailand); Chang	3–0	(Kazakhstan); Zhetysu	10
2013; Details	(Vietnam); Đắk Lắk	(China); Guangdong	3–1	(Kazakhstan); Zhetysu	(Japan); PFU BlueCats	3–0	(North Korea); Bo Tong Gang	8
2014; Details	(Thailand); Nakhon Pathom	(Japan); Hisamitsu Springs	3–0	(China); Tianjin	(Kazakhstan); Zhetysu	3–0	(Chinese Taipei); Taipei	10
2015; Details	(Vietnam); Hà Nam	(Thailand); Bangkok Glass	3–2	(Japan); Hisamitsu Springs	(China); Zhejiang	3–0	(Chinese Taipei); Taiwan Power	9
2016; Details	(Philippines); Biñan	(Japan); NEC Red Rockets	3–0	(China); Ba'Yi	(Thailand); Bangkok Glass	3–2	(Kazakhstan); Altay	13
2017; Details	(Kazakhstan); Oskemen	(Thailand); Supreme	3–1	(Japan); Hisamitsu Springs	(China); Tianjin	3–1	(Kazakhstan); Altay	8
2018; Details	(Kazakhstan); Oskemen	(Thailand); Supreme	3–2	(Japan); NEC Red Rockets	(China); Jiangsu	3–2	(Kazakhstan); Altay	9
2019; Details	(China); Tianjin	(China); Tianjin	3–1	(Thailand); Supreme	(Japan); Hisamitsu Springs	3–0	(Kazakhstan); Altay	10
2021; Details	(Thailand); Nakhon Ratchasima	(Kazakhstan); Altay	3–0	(Thailand); Nakhon Ratchasima	(Thailand); Supreme	3–0	(Iran); Saipa	7
2022; Details	(Kazakhstan); Semey	(Kazakhstan); Kuanysh	3–2	(Kazakhstan); Altay	(Thailand); Diamond Food	3–1	(Iran); Barij Essence	6
2023; Details	(Vietnam); Vĩnh Phúc	(Vietnam); Sport Center 1	3–2	(Thailand); Diamond Food	(China); Liaoning	3–1	(Chinese Taipei); KingWhale	9
2024; Details	(Thailand); Nakhon Ratchasima	(Japan); NEC Red Rockets	3–0	(Vietnam); Ninh Bình	(Thailand); Nakhon Ratchasima	3–0	(Kazakhstan); Kuanysh	8
2025; Details	(Philippines); Pasig	(Kazakhstan); Zhetysu	3–1	(Vietnam); Long An	(Thailand); Nakhon Ratchasima	3–1	(China); Beijing	12
2026; Details	(Thailand); Bangkok	(Japan); NEC Red Rockets	3–0	(Thailand); Nakhon Ratchasima	(Kazakhstan); Zhetysu	3–0	(Thailand); Supreme	8

=== Performances by club ===
Club	Champions	Runners-up	3rd place	4th place	Total
(China) Tianjin	5	3	1	1	10
(Thailand) Chang	3	2	2	0	7
(Japan) NEC Red Rockets	3	2	0	0	5
(Japan) Hisamitsu Springs	2	3	2	0	7
(Thailand) Supreme	2	1	1	1	5
(Kazakhstan) Rahat	2	0	1	3	6
(China) Shanghai	2	0	1	1	3
(Kazakhstan) Zhetysu	1	2	3	2	8
(Kazakhstan) Altay	1	1	0	4	6
(Thailand) Bangkok Glass	1	0	1	0	2
(Kazakhstan) Kuanysh	1	0	0	1	2
(South Korea) GS Caltex	1	0	0	0	1
(China) Guangdong	1	0	0	0	1
(Vietnam) Sport Center 1	1	0	0	0	1
(Thailand) Nakhon Ratchasima	0	2	2	0	4
(Chinese Taipei) Chung Shan	0	2	1	0	3
(China) Ba'Yi	0	2	0	0	2
(Japan) Toray Arrows	0	1	2	0	3
(Thailand) Aero Thai	0	1	1	0	2
(Thailand) Diamond Food	0	1	1	0	2
(Thailand) BEC World	0	1	0	0	1
(Vietnam) Ninh Bình	0	1	0	0	1
(Vietnam) Long An	0	1	0	0	1
(China) Zhejiang	0	0	2	0	2
(South Korea) Korea Expressway	0	0	1	0	1
(Japan) JT Marvelous	0	0	1	0	1
(Japan) PFU BlueCats	0	0	1	0	1
(China) Jiangsu	0	0	1	0	1
(China) Liaoning	0	0	1	0	1
(North Korea) Sobaeksu	0	0	0	2	2
(Kazakhstan) Alma Dinamo	0	0	0	1	1
(South Korea) Hyundai	0	0	0	1	1
(Kazakhstan) Astana	0	0	0	1	1
(Vietnam) Thông tin	0	0	0	1	1
(North Korea) Bo Tong Gang	0	0	0	1	1
(Chinese Taipei) Taipei	0	0	0	1	1
(Chinese Taipei) Taiwan Power	0	0	0	1	1
(Iran) Saipa	0	0	0	1	1
(Iran) Barij Essence	0	0	0	1	1
(Chinese Taipei) KingWhale	0	0	0	1	1

=== Performances by association ===
Association	Champions	Runners-up	3rd place	4th place	Total
China	8	5	6	3	21
Thailand	6	8	8	1	23
Japan	5	6	6	0	17
Kazakhstan	5	3	4	12	24
Vietnam	1	2	0	1	4
South Korea	1	0	1	1	3
Chinese Taipei	0	2	1	3	6
North Korea	0	0	0	3	3
Iran	0	0	0	2	2

=== Performances by zonal association ===
Zonal association	Champions	Runners-up	3rd place	4th place	Total
EAVA (East Asia)	14	13	14	10	51
SAVA (Southeast Asia)	7	10	8	2	27
CAVA (Central Asia)	5	3	4	14	26

== Medal summary ==
=== Medal table by club ===
Rank	club	Gold	Silver	Bronze	Total
1	(China) Tianjin	5	3	1	9
2	(Thailand) Chang	3	2	2	7
3	(Japan) NEC Red Rockets	3	2	0	5
4	(Japan) Hisamitsu Springs	2	3	2	7
5	(Thailand) Supreme	2	1	1	4
6	(Kazakhstan) Rahat	2	0	1	3
6	(China) Shanghai	2	0	1	3
8	(Kazakhstan) Zhetysu	1	2	3	6
9	(Kazakhstan) Altay	1	1	0	2
10	(Thailand) Bangkok Glass	1	0	1	2
11	(South Korea) GS Caltex	1	0	0	1
11	(China) Guangdong	1	0	0	1
11	(Kazakhstan) Kuanysh	1	0	0	1
11	(Vietnam) Sport Center 1	1	0	0	1
15	(Thailand) Nakhon Ratchasima	0	2	2	4
16	(Chinese Taipei) Chung Shan	0	2	1	3
17	(China) Ba'Yi	0	2	0	2
18	(Japan) Toray Arrows	0	1	2	3
19	(Thailand) Aero Thai	0	1	1	2
19	(Thailand) Diamond Food	0	1	1	2
21	(Thailand) BEC World	0	1	0	1
21	(Vietnam) Long An	0	1	0	1
21	(Vietnam) Ninh Bình	0	1	0	1
24	(China) Zhejiang	0	0	2	2
25	(Japan) JT Marvelous	0	0	1	1
25	(China) Jiangsu	0	0	1	1
25	(South Korea) Korea Expressway	0	0	1	1
25	(China) Liaoning	0	0	1	1
25	(Japan) PFU BlueCats	0	0	1	1
Totals (29 entries)		26	26	26	78

=== Medal table by association ===
Rank	Nation	Gold	Silver	Bronze	Total
1	China	8	5	6	19
2	Thailand	6	8	8	22
3	Japan	5	6	6	17
4	Kazakhstan	5	3	4	12
5	Vietnam	1	2	0	3
6	South Korea	1	0	1	2
7	Chinese Taipei	0	2	1	3
Totals (7 entries)		26	26	26	78

== Awards ==
Year	Most Valuable Player
1999	(South Korea) Park Soo-jeong (GS Caltex)
2001	(China) Shen Hong (Shanghai)
2002	(Japan) Keiko Hara (Hisamitsu Springs)
2004	(Kazakhstan) Olga Grushko (Rahat Almaty)
2005	(China) Li Shan (Tianjin)
2006	(China) Wang Li (Tianjin)
2007	(Kazakhstan) Yelena Pavlova (Rahat)
2008	(China) Li Shan (Tianjin)
2009	(Thailand) Onuma Sittirak (Federbrau)
2010	(Thailand) Nootsara Tomkom (Federbrau)
2011	(Thailand) Wilavan Apinyapong (Chang)
2012	(China) Yin Na (Tianjin)
2013	(China) Xu Yunli (Guangdong)
2014	(Japan) Miyu Nagaoka (Hisamitsu Springs)
2015	(Thailand) Pleumjit Thinkaow (Bangkok Glass)
2016	(Japan) Sarina Koga (NEC Red Rockets)
2017	(Senegal) Fatou Diouck (Supreme)
2018	(Thailand) Ajcharaporn Kongyot (Supreme)
2019	(China) Li Yingying (Tianjin)
2021	(Kazakhstan) Sana Anarkulova (Altay)
2022	(Serbia) Aleksandra Ćirović (Kuanysh)
2023	(Vietnam) Trần Thị Thanh Thúy (Sport Center 1)
2024	(Japan) Yoshino Sato (NEC Red Rockets)
2025	(Ukraine) Karina Denisova (Zhetysu)
2026	(Japan) Yoshino Sato (NEC Red Rockets)

Year	Best Setter
1999	(South Korea) Kim Guy-hyun (GS Caltex)
2002	(Japan) Keiko Hara (Hisamitsu Springs)
2004	(Chinese Taipei) Wu Hsiao-li (Chung Shan)
2005	(Chinese Taipei) Wu Hsiao-li (Chung Shan)
2007	(Thailand) Nootsara Tomkom (Sang Som)
2008	(Thailand) Nootsara Tomkom (Sang Som)
2009	(China) Yu Jing (Tianjin)
2010	(Japan) Yuki Kawai (JT Marvelous)
2011	(China) Yao Di (Tianjin)
2012	(China) Yao Di (Tianjin)
2013	(Kazakhstan) Korinna Ishimtseva (Zhetyssu)
2014	(Japan) Chizuru Kotō (Hisamitsu Springs)
2015	(Thailand) Pornpun Guedpard (Bangkok Glass)
2016	(Thailand) Pornpun Guedpard (Bangkok Glass)
2017	(China) Yao Di (Tianjin)
2018	(China) Rong Wanqianbai (Jiangsu)
2019	(China) Yao Di (Tianjin)
2021	(Thailand) Nootsara Tomkom (Nakhon Ratchasima)
2022	(Serbia) Danica Radenković (Altay)
2023	(Thailand) Nootsara Tomkom (Diamond Food)
2024	(Japan) Shiori Tsukada (NEC Red Rockets)
2025	(Ukraine) Daria Sharhorodska (Zhetysu)
2026	(Japan) Tsukasa Nakagawa (NEC Red Rockets)

Year	Best Outside Spikers
2014	(Japan) Yuki Ishii (Hisamitsu Springs)
2014	(China) Chen Liyi (Tianjin)
2015	(Japan) Miyu Nagaoka (Hisamitsu Springs)
2015	(Japan) Risa Shinnabe (Hisamitsu Springs)
2016	(Thailand) Wilavan Apinyapong (Bangkok Glass)
2016	(China) Liu Yanhan (Ba'Yi)
2017	(Thailand) Chatchu-on Moksri (Supreme)
2017	(Kazakhstan) Inna Matveyeva (Altay)
2018	(Thailand) Ajcharaporn Kongyot (Supreme)
2018	(Kazakhstan) Olga Kubassevich (Altay)
2019	(China) Li Yingying (Tianjin)
2019	(Japan) Hikari Kato (Hisamitsu Springs)
2021	(Ukraine) Nadiia Kodola (Altay)
2021	(Thailand) Chatchu-on Moksri (Nakhon Ratchasima)
2022	(Kazakhstan) Sana Anarkulova (Altay)
2022	(Ukraine) Karyna Denysova (Kuanysh)
2023	(Thailand) Sasipaporn Janthawisut (Diamond Food)
2023	(Vietnam) Trần Thị Thanh Thúy (Sport Center 1)
2024	(Thailand) Onuma Sittirak (Nakhon Ratchasima)
2024	(Thailand) Warisara Seetaloed (Ninh Bình)
2025	(Vietnam) Vi Thị Như Quỳnh (Long An)
2025	(Ukraine) Karina Denisova (Zhetysu)
2026	(Japan) Yoshino Sato (NEC Red Rockets)
2026	(Thailand) Sasipaporn Janthawisut (Nakhon Ratchasima)

Year	Best Middle Blockers
2014	(Japan) Kanako Hirai (Hisamitsu Springs)
2014	(Kazakhstan) Lyudmila Anarbayeva (Zhetyssu)
2015	(Vietnam) Nguyễn Thị Ngọc Hoa (Bangkok Glass)
2015	(China) Yang Zhou (Zhejiang)
2016	(Japan) Kana Ono (NEC Red Rockets)
2016	(Thailand) Pleumjit Thinkaow (Bangkok Glass)
2017	(Thailand) Pleumjit Thinkaow (Supreme)
2017	(Kazakhstan) Kristina Anikonova (Altay)
2018	(Russia) Natalia Sharshakova (Altay)
2018	(China) Wang Chenyue (Jiangsu)
2019	(China) Li Yanan (Tianjin)
2019	(China) Wang Yuanyuan (Tianjin)
2021	(Thailand) Pleumjit Thinkaow (Supreme)
2021	(Iran) Pouran Zare (Saipa)
2022	(Kazakhstan) Kristina Anikonova (Altay)
2022	(Thailand) Sasiwimol Sangpan (Diamond Food)
2023	(Thailand) Kaewkalaya Kamulthala (Diamond Food)
2023	(China) Wang Lujia (Liaoning Donghua)
2024	(Japan) Haruyo Shimamura (NEC Red Rockets)
2024	(United States) Markenzie Benoit (Nakhon Ratchasima)
2025	(Kazakhstan) Valeriya Yakutina (Zhetysu)
2025	(Thailand) Tichakorn Boonlert (Nakhon Ratchasima)
2026	(Thailand) Kaewkalaya Kamutthala (Nakhon Ratchasima)
2026	(Japan) Nichika Yamada (NEC Red Rockets)

Year	Best Libero
2002	(China) Sachiko Takahashi (Hisamitsu Springs)
2008	(China) Kanari Hamaguchi (Toray Arrows)
2009	(Thailand) Wanna Buakaew (Federbrau)
2010	(Thailand) Kotoe Inoue (JT Marvelous)
2011	(Thailand) Piyanut Pannoy (Chang)
2012	(China) Wang Qian (Tianjin)
2013	(Kazakhstan) Zhang Xian (Guangdong)
2014	(Kazakhstan) Marina Storozhenko (Zhetyssu)
2015	(Thailand) Tikamporn Changkeaw (Bangkok Glass)
2016	(Thailand) Tikamporn Changkeaw (Bangkok Glass)
2017	(Japan) Mana Toe (Hisamitsu Springs)
2018	(Japan) Sayaka Iwasaki (NEC Red Rockets)
2019	(Japan) Sayaka Tsutsui (Hisamitsu Springs)
2021	(Kazakhstan) Madina Beket (Altay)
2022	(Kazakhstan) Sabira Bekisheva (Kuanysh)
2023	(Vietnam) Nguyễn Khánh Đang (Sport Center 1)
2024	(Japan) Sayaka Daikuzono (NEC Red Rockets)
2025	(Vietnam) Nguyễn Khánh Đang (Long An)
2026	(Kazakhstan) Madina Beket (Zhetysu)

Year	Best Opposite Spiker
2014	(China) Li Ying (Tianjin)
2015	(Chinese Taipei) Chen Wan-ting (Taiwan Power)
2016	(Japan) Mizuki Yanagita (NEC Red Rockets)
2017	(Japan) Akane Ukishima (Hisamitsu Springs)
2018	(Japan) Nanami Hirose (NEC Red Rockets)
2019	(Thailand) Ajcharaporn Kongyot (Supreme)
2021	(Kazakhstan) Kristina Belova (Altay)
2022	(Kazakhstan) Tatyana Aldoshina (Kuanysh)
2023	(Brazil) Beatriz Flávio (KingWhale)
2024	(Vietnam) Nguyễn Thị Bích Tuyền (Ninh Bình)
2025	(Vietnam) Trần Thị Thanh Thúy (Long An)
2026	(Italy) Sylvia Nwakalor (NEC Red Rockets)

== See also ==
- AVC Women's Volleyball Continental Championship
- AVC Women's Volleyball Cup
