= 2018–19 Chinese Women's Volleyball Super League =

- League: Chinese Women's Volleyball Super League
- Sport: Volleyball
- Duration: Nov 8, 2018 – Mar 9, 2019
- Teams: 14

Regular season
- Season champions: Tianjin Bohai Bank
- Runners-up: Beijing Baic Motor
- Top scorer: (China) Li Yingying (TIA)

Finals
- Champions: Beijing Baic Motor
- Runners-up: Tianjin Bohai Bank

Chinese Women's Volleyball Super League seasons
- 2017–18 2019–20

The 2018–19 Chinese Women's Volleyball Super League was the 23rd season of the Chinese Women's Volleyball Super League, the highest professional volleyball league in China. The season began on 8 November 2018, and ended with the Finals on 9 March 2019. Tianjin Bohai Bank was the defending champion.

On 9 March 2019, Beijing Baic Motor won their 1st Chinese Women's Volleyball Super League title, after defeating Tianjin Bohai Bank in the final, 3–0 (3–2, 3–1, 3–1).

== Clubs ==
=== Clubs and locations ===
The map of the teams participating in the 2018–19 Chinese Volleyball League

Team	Stadium	Capacity	City/Area
Bayi Nanchang	Nanchang Stadium	2,500	Nanchang
Beijing Baic Motor	Beijing Guangcai Stadium	2,800	Beijing
Fujian Anxi Tiekuanyin	Fuqing City Stadium	4,500	Fuqing
Guangdong Evergrande	Shenzhen Sports Center	5,000	Shenzhen
Hebei	Xingtai City Stadium	4,500	Xingtai
Henan Yinge Industrial Investment	Luohe Gymnasium	3,500	Luohe
Jiangsu Zenith Steel	Changzhou University Gymnasium	5,000	Changzhou
Liaoning Bayuquan	Weinan Sports Training Base	4,000	Shenyang
Shandong Sports Lottery	Zibo Sports Center Complex	6,000	Zibo
Shanghai Bright Ubest	Luwan Sports Centre	3,500	Shanghai
Sichuan	Shuangliu Sports Center	3,400	Chengdu
Tianjin Bohai Bank	Tianjin People's Stadium	3,400	Tianjin
Yunnan University Dianchi College	Qujing Cultural Sports Park Gymnasium	5,000	Qujing
Zhejiang Jiaxing Xitang Ancient Town	Jiashan County Stadium	3,100	Jiashan

== Regular season ==
=== First stage ===
==== Group A ====
Pos	Team	Pld	W	L	Pts	SW	SL	SR	SPW	SPL	SPR
1	Liaoning Bayuquan	6	4	2	13	14	8	1.750	507	467	1.086
2	Guangdong Evergrande	6	4	2	12	14	7	2.000	490	442	1.109
3	Tianjin Bohai Bank	6	4	2	12	14	7	2.000	478	433	1.104
4	Shandong Sports Lottery	6	4	2	12	14	10	1.400	532	497	1.070
5	Bayi Nanchang	6	4	2	11	14	0	MAX	533	490	1.088
6	Henan Yinge Industrial Investment	3	1	2	3	4	16	0.250	404	486	0.831
7	Sichuan	6	0	6	0	1	18	0.056	347	476	0.729

Updated to match(es) played on 14 November 2018.
Source: Ranking Table Group A

==== Group B ====
Pos	Team	Pld	W	L	Pts	SW	SL	SR	SPW	SPL	SPR
1	Beijing Baic Motor	6	6	0	18	18	1	18.000	476	365	1.304
2	Shanghai Bright Ubest	6	5	1	15	16	5	3.200	492	394	1.249
3	Jiangsu Zenith Steel	6	4	2	13	14	7	2.000	485	419	1.158
4	Fujian Anxi Tiekuanyin	6	3	3	8	10	11	0.909	458	456	1.004
5	Zhejiang Jiaxing Xitang Ancient Town	6	2	4	6	6	13	0.462	388	449	0.864
6	Hebei	3	1	2	3	3	16	0.188	356	463	0.769
7	Yunnan University Dianchi College	6	0	6	1	4	18	0.222	427	536	0.797

Updated to match(es) played on 14 November 2018.
Source: Ranking Table Group B

=== Second stage ===
==== Top eight ====
Pos	Team	Pld	W	L	Pts	SW	SL	SR	SPW	SPL	SPR
1	Tianjin Bohai Bank	14	11	3	32	33	15	2.200	1131	1037	1.091
2	Beijing Baic Motor	14	10	4	28	35	22	1.591	1280	1160	1.103
3	Shanghai Bright Ubest	14	9	5	27	35	26	1.346	1306	1259	1.037
4	Jiangsu Zenith Steel	14	8	6	25	33	22	1.500	1242	1180	1.053
5	Liaoning Bayuquan	14	7	7	20	26	28	0.929	1167	1144	1.020
6	Shandong Sports Lottery	13	5	8	17	25	29	0.862	1142	1195	0.956
7	Guangdong Evergrande	14	5	9	15	22	33	0.667	1193	1209	0.987
8	Fujian Anxi Tiekuanyin	14	0	14	1	8	42	0.190	933	1210	0.771

Updated to match(es) played on 9 January 2019.
Source: Ranking Table Top eight

==== Bottom six ====
Pos	Team	Pld	W	L	Pts	SW	SL	SR	SPW	SPL	SPR
1	Bayi Nanchang	10	10	0	29	30	3	10.000	810	590	1.373
2	Henan Yinge Industrial Investment	10	6	4	18	21	16	1.313	827	773	1.070
3	Zhejiang Jiaxing Xitang Ancient Town	10	6	4	17	19	16	1.188	770	757	1.017
4	Yunnan University Dianchi College	10	4	6	14	18	20	0.900	815	853	0.955
5	Sichuan	10	4	6	12	18	22	0.818	821	858	0.957
6	Hebei	10	0	10	0	1	30	0.033	562	774	0.726

Updated to match(es) played on 9 January 2019.
Source: Ranking Table Bottom six

== Final stage ==
- Best-of-five series

=== Bracket ===
Final four
1	Tianjin Bohai Bank	3	3	0	3
4	Jiangsu Zenith Steel	1	0	3	2
2	Beijing Baic Motor	3	3	3
3	Shanghai Bright Ubest	0	2	1

Final
1	Tianjin Bohai Bank	2	1	1
2	Beijing Baic Motor	3	3	3
3rd place match
4	Jiangsu Zenith Steel	0	1
3	Shanghai Bright Ubest	3	3

=== Third stage ===
==== Final four ====
- (1) Tianjin Bohai Bank vs (4) Jiangsu Zenith Steel

Date	Time		Score		Set 1	Set 2	Set 3	Set 4	Set 5	Total	Report
12 Fed	19:30	Tianjin Bohai Bank	3–1	Jiangsu Zenith Steel	29–27	25–23	21–25	25–17		100–92	
16 Fed	18:35	Jiangsu Zenith Steel	0–3	Tianjin Bohai Bank	19–25	25–27	17–25			61–77	
19 Fed	19:30	Jiangsu Zenith Steel	0–3	Tianjin Bohai Bank	26–24	25–14	25–20			76–58	
26 Fed	19:30	Tianjin Bohai Bank	3–2	Jiangsu Zenith Steel	22–25	21–25	25–20	25–11	15–6	108–87	

- (2) Beijing Baic Motor vs (3) Shanghai Bright Ubest

Date	Time		Score		Set 1	Set 2	Set 3	Set 4	Set 5	Total	Report
12 Fed	20:00	Beijing Baic Motor	3–0	Shanghai Bright Ubest	25–16	25–18	25–19			75–53	
16 Fed	16:00	Shanghai Bright Ubest	2–3	Beijing Baic Motor	21–25	25–21	13–25	25–19	11–15	95–105	
19 Fed	19:30	Shanghai Bright Ubest	1–3	Beijing Baic Motor	25–22	10–25	20–25	16–25		71–97	

=== Fourth stage ===
==== 3rd place match ====
- Best-of-three series

Date	Time		Score		Set 1	Set 2	Set 3	Set 4	Set 5	Total	Report
02 Mar	15:00	Shanghai Bright Ubest	3–0	Jiangsu Zenith Steel	26–24	25–15	25–21			76–60	
05 Mar	19:30	Jiangsu Zenith Steel	1–3	Shanghai Bright Ubest	15–25	25–23	25–23	19–25	6–15	90–111	

==== Final ====
- Best-of-five series

Date	Time		Score		Set 1	Set 2	Set 3	Set 4	Set 5	Total	Report
02 Mar	16:00	Tianjin Bohai Bank	2–3	Beijing Baic Motor	22–25	25–27	25–21	25–20	16–18	113–111	
05 Mar	19:30	Beijing Baic Motor	3–1	Tianjin Bohai Bank	27–29	26–24	25–16	29–27		107–96	
09 Mar	16:00	Beijing Baic Motor	3–1	Tianjin Bohai Bank	25–21	25–15	20–25	25–20		95–81	

== Final standing ==
Rank	Team
1st place, gold medalist(s)	Beijing Baic Motor
2nd place, silver medalist(s)	Tianjin Bohai Bank
3rd place, bronze medalist(s)	Shanghai Bright Ubest
4	Jiangsu Zenith Steel
5	Liaoning Bayuquan
6	Shandong Sports Lottery
7	Guangdong Evergrande
8	Fujian Anxi Tiekuanyin
9	Bayi Nanchang
10	Henan Yinge Industrial Investment
11	Zhejiang Jiaxing Xitang Ancient Town
12	Yunnan University Dianchi College
13	Sichuan
14	Hebei

2018–19 Chinese Women's Volleyball Super League Champions

1st title
