= 1999 AVC Cup Women's Club Tournament =

1999 Asian Club Tournament
Tournament details
- Host country: Thailand
- Dates: 19–23 May
- Teams: 6
- Venue: 1 (in 1 host city)

Final positions
- Champions: (South Korea) LG Caltex (1st title)

Tournament awards
- MVP: (South Korea) Park Soo-jeong

The 1999 AVC Cup Women's Club Tournament was the 1st staging of the AVC Club Championships. The tournament was held in Ubon Ratchathani, Thailand.

== Final standing ==
Rank	Team
1st place, gold medalist(s)	(South Korea) LG Caltex
2nd place, silver medalist(s)	(Thailand) Aero Thai
3rd place, bronze medalist(s)	(China) Shanghai
4	(Kazakhstan) Alma Dinamo
5	(Japan) Toyobo Orchis
6	Chinese Taipei

== Awards ==
- Most valuable player

(South Korea) Park Soo-jeong

- Best setter

(South Korea) Kim Guy-hyun

- Best spiker

(South Korea) Chang Yoon-hee
