= Zeng Chunlei =

Chinese volleyball player

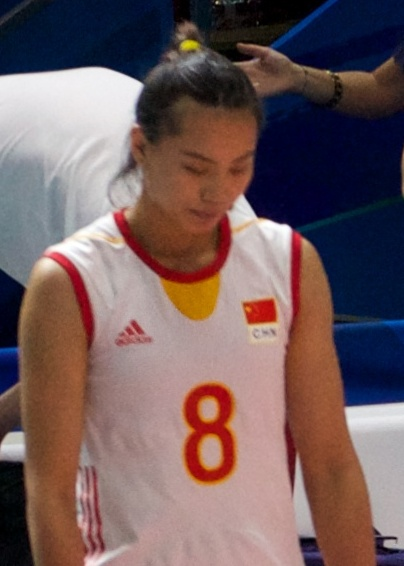
- Zeng Chunlei in 2014

Personal information
- Full name: Zeng Chunlei
- Nickname: Leilei
- Nationality: Chinese
- Born: 3 November 1989 (age 36) Beijing, China
- Home town: Beijing, China
- Height: 1.87 m (6 ft 1 1/2 in)
- Weight: 69 kg (152 lb)
- Spike: 318 cm (125 in)
- Block: 315 cm (124 in)

Volleyball information
- Position: Opposite hitter / Outside Hitter
- Current club: Beijing

National team
- Years: Team
- 2012–: China
Honours
Women's volleyball
Representing China
World Championship
Silver medal – second place	2014 Italy	Team
Bronze medal – third place	2018 Japan	Team
World Cup
Gold medal – first place	2019 Japan	Team
Gold medal – first place	2015 Japan	Team
World Grand Champions Cup
Gold medal – first place	2017 Japan	Team
Volleyball Nations League
Bronze medal – third place	2018 Nanjing	Team
Asian Games
Gold medal – first place	2018 Jakarta-Palembang
Asian Cup
Silver medal – second place	2012 Almaty
- Updated on February 2018

Zeng Chunlei (Chinese: 曾春蕾; pinyin: Zēng Chūnlěi; born 3 November 1989 in Beijing), is a Chinese volleyball player, who is a member of the Chinese women's national team that participated at the London Olympic Games. She currently plays for Chinese club Beijing.

== Career ==
Zeng played at the 2013 Club World Championship with Guangdong Evergrande winning the bronze medal after defeating 3-1 to Voléro Zürich.

Zeng was the captain of the Chinese team that won the 2015 FIVB women's world cup in Japan. She participated at the 2019 Montreux Volley Masters,

She signed for the Italian club Pomi Casalmaggiore for the 2017'18 season.

== Clubs ==
- (China) Beijing (2005–2013)
- (China) Guangdong Evergrande (2013)
- (China) Beijing (2013–2017)
- (Italy) Pomi Casalmaggiore (2017)
- (China) Beijing (2017–2018)
- (China) Shanghai (2018) (loaned)
- (China) Beijing (2018–2020)

== Awards ==
=== Clubs ===
- 2019/2020 Chinese League - Bronze medal, with Beijing BAIC Motor
- 2017/18 Chinese League - Runner-up with, Shangai
- 2013 Club World Championship - Bronze medal, with Guangdong Evergrande
