= 2019–20 Chinese Women's Volleyball Super League =

- League: Chinese Women's Volleyball Super League
- Sport: Volleyball
- Duration: Nov 2, 2019 – January 21, 2020
- Teams: 14

Regular season
- Season champions: Tianjin Bohai Bank
- Season MVP: (China) Zhu Ting (TIA)
- Top scorer: (Germany) Louisa Lippmann (SHA)

Finals
- Champions: Tianjin Bohai Bank
- Runners-up: Shanghai Bright Ubest

Chinese Women's Volleyball Super League seasons
- ← 2018–19 2020–21 →

The 2019–20 Chinese Women's Volleyball Super League was the 24th season of the Chinese Women's Volleyball Super League, the highest professional volleyball league in China. The season began on 2 November 2019, and ended with the Finals on 21 January 2020. Beijing Baic Motor was the defending champion.

== Clubs ==
The map of the teams participating in the 2019–20 Chinese Volleyball League

=== Clubs and locations ===
Team	Head coach	Captain	City	Stadium	Capacity	2018–19 season
Beijing Baic Motor	(China) Zhang Jianzhang	(China) Liu Xiaotong	Beijing	Beijing Glory Stadium	2,800	1st
Tianjin Bohai Bank	(China) Chen Youquan	(China) Zhu Ting	Tianjin	Tianjin People's Gymnasium	3,400	2nd
Shanghai Bright Ubest	(China) Wang Zhiteng	(China) Zhang Yichan	Shanghai	Shanghai Luwan Gymnasium	3,500	3rd
Jiangsu Zhongtian Steel	(China) Cai Bin	(China) Zhang Changning	Changzhou	Zhongtian Steel Gymnasium	3,000	4th
Liaoning Huajun	(China) Zhao Yong	(China) Ding Xia	Yingkou	Hongyun Gymnasium	2,500	5th
Shandong Sports Lottery	(China) Li Yanlong	(China) Song meili	Zibo	Zhangdian Gymnasium	2,000	6th
Guangdong Evergrande	(China) Fang Yan	(China) Li Yao	Shenzhen	Shenzhen Bao'an Gymnasium	3,000	7th
Fujian Anxi Tiekuanyin	(China) Hu Jin	(China) Lin Lin	Quanzhou	Anxi Wutong Gymnasium	2,700	8th
Bayi Nanchang	(China) Wu Xiaojiang	(China) Liu Yanhan	Nanchang	Nanchang Stadium	2,500	9th
Henan Yinge Industrial Investment	(China) Jiao Shuai	(China) Zhang Zihan	Xuchang	Xuchang Vocational Technical College Gymnasium	4,500	10th
Zhejiang Jiaxing Xitang Ancient Town	(China) Wang Hebing	(China) Wang Na	Jiaxing	Jiashan Gymnasium	3,000	11th
Dianchi College of Yunnan University	(China) Yang Jingmiao	(China) Liu Mengya	Qujing	Qujing Cultural and Sports Park Gymnasium	6,176	12th
Sichuan Jinlang Sports	(China) Ye Wen	(China) Wang Chen	Chengdu	Shuangliu Sports Centre	3,400	13th
Hebei Hairui	(China) Li Lijun	(China) Luo Xiao	Shijiazhuang	Shijiazhuang University Gymnastic Hall	3,000	14th

== Regular season ==
=== First stage ===
==== Group A ====
Pos	Team	Pld	W	L	Pts	SW	SL	SR	SPW	SPL	SPR
1	Beijing Baic Motor	4	4	0	12	12	1	12.000	322	249	1.293
2	Bayi Nanchang	4	2	2	6	7	6	1.167	301	279	1.079
3	Fujian Anxi Tiekuanyin	4	0	4	0	0	12	0.000	205	300	0.683

Source: Ranking Table Group A

Date	Time		Score		Set 1	Set 2	Set 3	Set 4	Set 5	Total	Report
02 Nov	16:00	Bayi Nanchang	3–0	Fujian Anxi Tiekuanyin	25–18	25–17	25–19			75–54	
05 Nov	19:30	Fujian Anxi Tiekuanyin	0–3	Beijing Baic Motor	15–25	23–25	16–25			54–75	
09 Nov	16:00	Beijing Baic Motor	3–0	Bayi Nanchang	25–23	25–20	25–14			75–57	
16 Nov	16:00	Fujian Anxi Tiekuanyin	0–3	Bayi Nanchang	16–25	23–25	14–25			53–75	
19 Nov	19:30	Beijing Baic Motor	3–0	Fujian Anxi Tiekuanyin	25–14	25–16	25–14			75–44	
23 Nov	16:00	Bayi Nanchang	1–3	Beijing Baic Motor	23–25	20–25	25–19	26–28		94–97	

==== Group B ====
Pos	Team	Pld	W	L	Pts	SW	SL	SR	SPW	SPL	SPR
1	Tianjin Bohai Bank	4	4	0	12	12	0	MAX	300	222	1.351
2	Guangdong Evergrande	4	2	2	6	6	6	1.000	264	248	1.065
3	Henan Yinge Industrial Investment	4	0	4	0	0	12	0.000	206	300	0.687

Source: Ranking Table Group B

Date	Time		Score		Set 1	Set 2	Set 3	Set 4	Set 5	Total	Report
02 Nov	16:00	Guangdong Evergrande	3–0	Henan Yinge Industrial Investment	25–15	25–18	25–18			75–51	
05 Nov	19:30	Tianjin Bohai Bank	3–0	Henan Yinge Industrial Investment	25–17	25–18	25–19			75–54	
09 Nov	16:00	Tianjin Bohai Bank	3–0	Guangdong Evergrande	25–15	25–22	25–18			75–55	
16 Nov	16:00	Henan Yinge Industrial Investment	0–3	Guangdong Evergrande	19–25	13–25	15–25			47–75	
19 Nov	19:30	Henan Yinge Industrial Investment	0–3	Tianjin Bohai Bank	19–25	17–25	18–25			54–75	
23 Nov	16:00	Guangdong Evergrande	0–3	Tianjin Bohai Bank	17–25	22–25	20–25			59–75	

==== Group C ====
Pos	Team	Pld	W	L	Pts	SW	SL	SR	SPW	SPL	SPR
1	Shanghai Bright Ubest	6	6	0	18	18	1	18.000	474	342	1.386
2	Shandong Sports Lottery	6	3	3	10	11	9	1.222	460	413	1.114
3	Zhejiang Jiaxing Xitang Ancient Town	6	3	3	8	10	11	0.909	444	440	1.009
4	Hebei Hairui	6	0	6	0	0	18	0.000	267	450	0.593

Source: Ranking Table Group C

Date	Time		Score		Set 1	Set 2	Set 3	Set 4	Set 5	Total	Report
02 Nov	16:00	Shanghai Bright Ubest	3–0	Hebei Hairui	25–14	25–11	25–12			75–37	
02 Nov	16:00	Shandong Sports Lottery	3–0	Zhejiang Jiaxing Xitang Ancient Town	25–22	25–22	25–20			75–64	
05 Nov	19:30	Shanghai Bright Ubest	3–1	Zhejiang Jiaxing Xitang Ancient Town	21–25	25–12	25–16	25–15		96–68	
05 Nov	19:30	Shandong Sports Lottery	3–0	Hebei Hairui	25–13	25–11	25–19			75–43	
09 Nov	16:00	Shandong Sports Lottery	0–3	Shanghai Bright Ubest	21–25	26–28	22–25			69–78	
09 Nov	19:30	Zhejiang Jiaxing Xitang Ancient Town	3–0	Hebei Hairui	25–21	25–12	25–11			75–44	
16 Nov	19:30	Zhejiang Jiaxing Xitang Ancient Town	3–2	Shandong Sports Lottery	17–25	25–20	25–22	15–25	16–14	98–106	
16 Nov	19:30	Hebei Hairui	0–3	Shanghai Bright Ubest	14–25	18–25	12–25			44–75	
19 Nov	19:30	Zhejiang Jiaxing Xitang Ancient Town	0–3	Shanghai Bright Ubest	23–25	18–25	23–25			64–75	
19 Nov	19:30	Hebei Hairui	0–3	Shandong Sports Lottery	21–25	21–25	13–25			55–75	
23 Nov	16:00	Shanghai Bright Ubest	3–0	Shandong Sports Lottery	25–17	25–21	25–22			75–60	
23 Nov	19:30	Hebei Hairui	0–3	Zhejiang Jiaxing Xitang Ancient Town	11–25	15–25	18–25			44–75	

==== Group D ====
Pos	Team	Pld	W	L	Pts	SW	SL	SR	SPW	SPL	SPR
1	Jiangsu Zhongtian Steel	6	6	0	18	18	2	9.000	496	381	1.302
2	Liaoning Huajun	6	4	2	12	13	8	1.625	499	408	1.223
3	Dianchi College of Yunnan University	6	1	5	3	6	15	0.400	425	507	0.838
4	Sichuan Jinlang Sports	6	1	5	3	3	15	0.200	318	442	0.719

Source: Ranking Table Group D

Date	Time		Score		Set 1	Set 2	Set 3	Set 4	Set 5	Total	Report
02 Nov	16:00	Jiangsu Zhongtian Steel	3–0	Sichuan Jinlang Sports	25–16	25–19	25–18			75–53	
02 Nov	16:00	Liaoning Huajun	3–1	Dianchi College of Yunnan University	22–25	25–15	25–12	25–13		97–65	
05 Nov	19:30	Jiangsu Zhongtian Steel	3–1	Liaoning Huajun	25–22	20–25	25–22	25–18		95–87	
05 Nov	19:30	Sichuan Jinlang Sports	3–0	Dianchi College of Yunnan University	26–24	25–18	26–24			77–66	
09 Nov	16:00	Dianchi College of Yunnan University	1–3	Jiangsu Zhongtian Steel	25–22	16–25	22–25	23–25		86–97	
09 Nov	16:00	Liaoning Huajun	3–0	Sichuan Jinlang Sports	25–11	25–8	25–17			75–36	
15 Nov	19:30	Sichuan Jinlang Sports	0–3	Jiangsu Zhongtian Steel	17–25	18–25	10–25			45–75	
16 Nov	16:00	Dianchi College of Yunnan University	1–3	Liaoning Huajun	25–23	17–25	18–25	26–28		86–101	
19 Nov	19:30	Dianchi College of Yunnan University	3–0	Sichuan Jinlang Sports	25–18	25–18	26–24			76–60	
19 Nov	19:30	Liaoning Huajun	0–3	Jiangsu Zhongtian Steel	27–29	17–25	20–25			64–79	
23 Nov	16:00	Sichuan Jinlang Sports	0–3	Liaoning Huajun	11–25	15–25	21–25			47–75	
23 Nov	16:00	Jiangsu Zhongtian Steel	3–0	Dianchi College of Yunnan University	25–13	25–16	25–17			75–46	

=== Second stage ===
==== Group E ====
Pos	Team	Pld	W	L	Pts	SW	SL	SR	SPW	SPL	SPR
1	Shanghai Bright Ubest	6	5	1	13	15	8	1.875	514	473	1.087
2	Beijing Baic Motor	6	4	2	13	14	8	1.750	510	474	1.076
3	Shandong Sports Lottery	7	3	4	8	10	12	0.833	500	527	0.949
4	Bayi Nanchang	6	0	6	0	7	18	0.389	531	581	0.914

Source: Ranking Table Group E

Date	Time		Score		Set 1	Set 2	Set 3	Set 4	Set 5	Total	Report
30 Nov	16:00	Beijing Baic Motor	3–1	Shandong Sports Lottery	25–19	26–24	23–25	25–22		99–90	
30 Nov	16:00	Shanghai Bright Ubest	3–2	Bayi Nanchang	25–17	28–25	24–26	25–16	15–8	117–92	
10 Dec	19:30	Beijing Baic Motor	2–3	Shanghai Bright Ubest	25–23	17–25	25–19	20–25	12–15	99–107	
10 Dec	19:30	Bayi Nanchang	2–3	Shandong Sports Lottery	25–27	25–19	25–23	22–25	24–26	121–120	
14 Dec	16:00	Shandong Sports Lottery	3–0	Beijing Baic Motor	25–22	25–21	25–22			75–65	
14 Dec	16:00	Bayi Nanchang	1–3	Shanghai Bright Ubest	19–25	25–21	14–25	20–25		78–96	
17 Dec	19:30	Shanghai Bright Ubest	0–3	Beijing Baic Motor	22–25	19–25	10–25			51–75	
17 Dec	19:30	Shandong Sports Lottery	3–1	Bayi Nanchang	25–22	25–22	11–25	25–20		86–89	

==== Group F ====
Pos	Team	Pld	W	L	Pts	SW	SL	SR	SPW	SPL	SPR
1	Tianjin Bohai Bank	6	6	0	17	18	3	6.000	490	389	1.260
2	Guangdong Evergrande	6	3	3	7	10	13	0.769	480	501	0.958
3	Jiangsu Zhongtian Steel	6	2	4	8	11	13	0.846	514	524	0.981
4	Liaoning Huajun	6	1	5	4	6	16	0.375	437	507	0.862

Source: Ranking Table Group F

Date	Time		Score		Set 1	Set 2	Set 3	Set 4	Set 5	Total	Report
30 Nov	16:00	Tianjin Bohai Bank	3–0	Liaoning Huajun	25–13	25–3	25–17			75–33	
30 Nov	16:00	Guangdong Evergrande	3–0	Jiangsu Zhongtian Steel	25–22	25–17	25–14			75–53	
10 Dec	19:30	Jiangsu Zhongtian Steel	1–3	Tianjin Bohai Bank	25–16	19–25	22–25	20–25		86–91	
10 Dec	19:30	Guangdong Evergrande	3–2	Liaoning Huajun	25–18	16–25	26–24	26–28	15–9	108–104	
14 Dec	16:00	Liaoning Huajun	0–3	Tianjin Bohai Bank	9–25	20–25	18–25			47–75	
14 Dec	16:00	Jiangsu Zhongtian Steel	2–3	Guangdong Evergrande	21–25	25–22	19–25	25–21	12–15	102–108	
17 Dec	19:30	Tianjin Bohai Bank	3–2	Jiangsu Zhongtian Steel	25–16	19–25	25–23	15–25	15–10	99–99	
17 Dec	19:30	Liaoning Huajun	3–1	Guangdong Evergrande	25–17	17–25	25–19	25–14		92–75	

==== Group G ====
Pos	Team	Pld	W	L	Pts	SW	SL	SR	SPW	SPL	SPR
1	Zhejiang Jiaxing Xitang Ancient Town	4	4	0	12	12	0	MAX	300	173	1.734
2	Fujian Anxi Tiekuanyin	4	2	2	6	6	6	1.000	235	239	0.983
3	Hebei Hairui	4	0	4	0	0	12	0.000	177	300	0.590

Source: Ranking Table Group G

Date	Time		Score		Set 1	Set 2	Set 3	Set 4	Set 5	Total	Report
30 Nov	16:00	Fujian Anxi Tiekuanyin	3–0	Hebei Hairui	25–12	25–11	25–12			75–35	
10 Dec	19:30	Fujian Anxi Tiekuanyin	0–3	Zhejiang Jiaxing Xitang Ancient Town	15–25	12–25	15–25			42–75	
14 Dec	19:30	Hebei Hairui	0–3	Fujian Anxi Tiekuanyin	20–25	13–25	21–25			54–75	
17 Dec	19:30	Zhejiang Jiaxing Xitang Ancient Town	3–0	Fujian Anxi Tiekuanyin	25–15	25–15	25–13			75–43	

==== Group H ====
Pos	Team	Pld	W	L	Pts	SW	SL	SR	SPW	SPL	SPR
1	Sichuan Jinlang Sports	3	3	0	8	9	6	1.500	336	331	1.015
2	Dianchi College of Yunnan University	4	2	2	6	7	6	1.167	295	290	1.017
3	Henan Yinge Industrial Investment	4	1	3	4	6	10	0.600	342	352	0.972

Source: Ranking Table Group H

Date	Time		Score		Set 1	Set 2	Set 3	Set 4	Set 5	Total	Report
30 Nov	16:00	Henan Yinge Industrial Investment	2–3	Sichuan Jinlang Sports	19–25	25–19	25–17	22–25	12–15	103–101	
10 Dec	19:30	Henan Yinge Industrial Investment	3–1	Dianchi College of Yunnan University	25–16	19–25	25–18	25–18		94–77	
14 Dec	16:00	Sichuan Jinlang Sports	3–1	Henan Yinge Industrial Investment	25–19	25–20	23–25	25–22		98–86	
17 Dec	19:30	Dianchi College of Yunnan University	3–0	Henan Yinge Industrial Investment	26–24	25–17	25–18			76–59	

== Final stage ==
=== Bracket ===
Final four
E1	Shanghai Bright Ubest	3	1	3
F2	Guangdong Evergrande	1	3	1
F1	Tianjin Bohai Bank	3	3
E2	Beijing Baic Motor	0	2

Final
E1	Shanghai Bright Ubest	0	0	1
F1	Tianjin Bohai Bank	3	3	3
3rd place match
F2	Guangdong Evergrande	0	2
E2	Beijing Baic Motor	3	3

Fifth place play-offs
E3	Shandong Sports Lottery	3	1	1
F4	Liaoning Huajun	1	3	3
F3	Jiangsu Zhongtian Steel	1	3	3
E4	Bayi Nanchang	3	1	0

Fifth place match
F4	Liaoning Huajun	0	0
F3	Jiangsu Zhongtian Steel	3	3
Seventh place match
E3	Shandong Sports Lottery	3	2	3
E4	Bayi Nanchang	0	3	1

=== Third stage ===
==== Thirteenth place match ====
Date	Time		Score		Set 1	Set 2	Set 3	Set 4	Set 5	Total	Report
24 Dec	19:30	Henan Yinge Industrial Investment	3–1	Hebei Hairui	25–13	25–23	13–25	25–19		88–80	
28 Dec	19:30	Hebei Hairui	0–3	Henan Yinge Industrial Investment	19–25	20–25	18–25			57–75	

==== Eleventh place match ====
Date	Time		Score		Set 1	Set 2	Set 3	Set 4	Set 5	Total	Report
24 Dec	19:30	Dianchi College of Yunnan University	3–0	Fujian Anxi Tiekuanyin	25–20	25–23	25–16			75–59	
28 Dec	16:00	Fujian Anxi Tiekuanyin	2–3	Dianchi College of Yunnan University	27–29	17–25	25–23	26–24	7–15	102–116	

==== Ninth place match ====
Date	Time		Score		Set 1	Set 2	Set 3	Set 4	Set 5	Total	Report
24 Dec	19:30	Zhejiang Jiaxing Xitang Ancient Town	3–0	Sichuan Jinlang Sports	25–19	25–23	25–16			75–58	
28 Dec	16:00	Sichuan Jinlang Sports	0–3	Zhejiang Jiaxing Xitang Ancient Town	23–25	19–25	22–25			64–75	

==== Fifth place play-offs ====
- (E3) Shandong Sports Lottery vs (F4) Liaoning Huajun

Date	Time		Score		Set 1	Set 2	Set 3	Set 4	Set 5	Total	Report
24 Dec	19:30	Shandong Sports Lottery	3–1	Liaoning Huajun	25–23	23–25	25–23	26–24		99–95	
28 Dec	16:00	Liaoning Huajun	3–1	Shandong Sports Lottery	22–25	26–24	25–20	25–18		98–87	
31 Dec	19:30	Shandong Sports Lottery	1–3	Liaoning Huajun	25–22	27–25	11–25	19–25		82–97	

- (F3) Jiangsu Zhongtian Steel vs (E4) Bayi Nanchang

Date	Time		Score		Set 1	Set 2	Set 3	Set 4	Set 5	Total	Report
24 Dec	19:30	Jiangsu Zhongtian Steel	1–3	Bayi Nanchang	18–25	22–25	25–9	23–25		88–84	
28 Dec	16:00	Bayi Nanchang	1–3	Jiangsu Zhongtian Steel	25–23	14–25	22–25	11–25		72–98	
31 Dec	19:30	Jiangsu Zhongtian Steel	3–0	Bayi Nanchang	25–18	26–24	25–17			76–59	

==== Final four ====
- (E1) Shanghai Bright Ubest vs (F2) Guangdong Evergrande

Date	Time		Score		Set 1	Set 2	Set 3	Set 4	Set 5	Total	Report
24 Dec	19:30	Shanghai Bright Ubest	3–1	Guangdong Evergrande	25–23	29–27	24–26	32–30		110–106	
28 Dec	19:30	Guangdong Evergrande	3–1	Shanghai Bright Ubest	25–19	19–25	25–20	25–21		94–85	
31 Dec	19:30	Shanghai Bright Ubest	3–1	Guangdong Evergrande	25–15	20–25	29–27	25–21		99–88	

- (F1) Tianjin Bohai Bank vs (E2) Beijing Baic Motor

Date	Time		Score		Set 1	Set 2	Set 3	Set 4	Set 5	Total	Report
24 Dec	19:30	Tianjin Bohai Bank	3–0	Beijing Baic Motor	25–15	25–19	25–23			75–57	
28 Dec	16:00	Beijing Baic Motor	2–3	Tianjin Bohai Bank	23–25	23–25	25–22	25–18	5–15	101–105	

=== Fourth stage ===
==== Seventh place match ====
Date	Time		Score		Set 1	Set 2	Set 3	Set 4	Set 5	Total	Report
07 Jan	19:30	Shandong Sports Lottery	3–0	Bayi Nanchang	25–16	25–19	25–19			75–54	
11 Jan	16:00	Bayi Nanchang	3–2	Shandong Sports Lottery	25–15	22–25	24–26	25–23	15–5	111–94	
14 Jan	19:30	Shandong Sports Lottery	3–1	Bayi Nanchang	20–25	25–21	25–21	25–15		95–82	

==== Fifth place match ====
Date	Time		Score		Set 1	Set 2	Set 3	Set 4	Set 5	Total	Report
07 Jan	19:30	Jiangsu Zhongtian Steel	3–0	Liaoning Huajun	25–17	25–21	25–22			75–60	
11 Jan	16:00	Liaoning Huajun	0–3	Jiangsu Zhongtian Steel	18–25	20–25	24–26			62–76	

==== Third place match ====
Date	Time		Score		Set 1	Set 2	Set 3	Set 4	Set 5	Total	Report
07 Jan	19:30	Beijing Baic Motor	3–0	Guangdong Evergrande	25–21	25–15	25–20			75–56	
11 Jan	16:00	Guangdong Evergrande	2–3	Beijing Baic Motor	25–22	22–25	25–16	12–25	17–19	101–107	

==== Final ====
Date	Time		Score		Set 1	Set 2	Set 3	Set 4	Set 5	Total	Report
07 Jan	19:30	Tianjin Bohai Bank	3–0	Shanghai Bright Ubest	25–11	25–17	25–14			75–42	
11 Jan	16:00	Shanghai Bright Ubest	0–3	Tianjin Bohai Bank	23–25	19–25	17–25			59–75	
14 Jan	19:30	Shanghai Bright Ubest	1–3	Tianjin Bohai Bank	25–22	16–25	14–25	19–25		74–97	

== Final standing ==
Rank	Team
1st place, gold medalist(s)	Tianjin Bohai Bank
2nd place, silver medalist(s)	Shanghai Bright Ubest
3rd place, bronze medalist(s)	Beijing Baic Motor
4	Guangdong Evergrande
5	Jiangsu Zhongtian Steel
6	Liaoning Huajun
7	Shandong Sports Lottery
8	Bayi Nanchang
9	Zhejiang Jiaxing Xitang Ancient Town
10	Sichuan Jinlang Sports
11	Dianchi College of Yunnan University
12	Fujian Anxi Tiekuanyin
13	Henan Yinge Industrial Investment
14	Hebei Hairui

2019–20 Chinese Women's Volleyball Super League Champions
Tianjin Bohai Bank
