= 2002 AVC Cup Women's Club Tournament =

2002 Asian Club Tournament
Tournament details
- Host country: Thailand
- Dates: 22–27 May
- Teams: 8
- Venue: 1 (in 1 host city)

Final positions
- Champions: (Japan) Hisamitsu Springs (1st title)

Tournament awards
- MVP: (Japan) Keiko Hara

The 2002 AVC Cup Women's Club Tournament was the 4th staging of the AVC Club Championships. The tournament was held in Bangkok, Thailand.

== Preliminary round ==
=== Pool A ===
Pos	Team	Pld	W	L	Pts	SW	SL	SR	SPW	SPL	SPR	Qualification
1	(Thailand) BEC World	3	3	0	6	9	1	9.000	248	172	1.442	Semifinals
2	(Kazakhstan) Rahat Almaty	3	2	1	5	6	5	1.200	0	0	—	Semifinals
3	Australia Institute of Sport	3	1	2	4	5	7	0.714	269	296	0.909	5th–8th classification
4	(Vietnam) Giấy Bãi Bằng	3	0	3	3	2	9	0.222	0	0	—	5th–8th classification

Date		Score		Set 1	Set 2	Set 3	Set 4	Set 5	Total
22 May	BEC World (Thailand)	3–1	Australia Institute of Sport	25–20	25–16	23–25	25–17		98–78
22 May	Rahat Almaty (Kazakhstan)	3–1	(Vietnam) Giấy Bãi Bằng						
23 May	Rahat Almaty (Kazakhstan)	0–3	(Thailand) BEC World	13–25	12–25	15–25			40–75
23 May	Australia Institute of Sport	3–1	(Vietnam) Giấy Bãi Bằng	25–20	30–28	23–25	26–24		104–97
24 May	Giấy Bãi Bằng (Vietnam)	0–3	(Thailand) BEC World	23–25	18–25	13–25			54–75
24 May	Australia Institute of Sport	1–3	(Kazakhstan) Rahat Almaty	19–25	28–26	20–25	20–25		87–101

=== Pool B ===
Pos	Team	Pld	W	L	Pts	SW	SL	SR	SPW	SPL	SPR	Qualification
1	(Japan) Hisamitsu Springs	3	3	0	6	9	0	MAX	227	163	1.393	Semifinals
2	(China) Shanghai	3	2	1	5	6	5	1.200	0	0	—	Semifinals
3	(Chinese Taipei) Chung Shan	3	1	2	4	5	6	0.833	0	0	—	5th–8th classification
4	(Indonesia) Jakarta	3	0	3	3	0	9	0.000	0	0	—	5th–8th classification

Date		Score		Set 1	Set 2	Set 3	Set 4	Set 5	Total
22 May	Hisamitsu Springs (Japan)	3–0	(Indonesia) Jakarta	25–22	25–14	25–14			75–50
22 May	Shanghai (China)	3–2	(Chinese Taipei) Chung Shan						
23 May	Hisamitsu Springs (Japan)	3–0	(China) Shanghai	25–21	25–15	27–25			77–61
23 May	Chung Shan (Chinese Taipei)	3–0	(Indonesia) Jakarta						
24 May	Jakarta (Indonesia)	0–3	(China) Shanghai	14–25	20–25	9–25			43–75
24 May	Chung Shan (Chinese Taipei)	0–3	(Japan) Hisamitsu Springs	16–25	22–25	14–25			52–75

== Classification 5th–8th ==
5th–8th places
26 May – Bangkok
(Australia) AIS	3
(Indonesia) Jakarta	1
26 May – Bangkok
(Chinese Taipei) Chung Shan	3
(Vietnam) Giấy Bãi Bằng	1

5th place
27 May – Bangkok
(Australia) AIS	1
(Chinese Taipei) Chung Shan	3
7th place
27 May – Bangkok
(Indonesia) Jakarta	1
(Vietnam) Giấy Bãi Bằng	3

=== Semifinals ===
Date		Score		Set 1	Set 2	Set 3	Set 4	Set 5	Total
26 May	Australia Institute of Sport	3–1	(Indonesia) Jakarta	25–19	13–25	25–17	25–17		88–78
26 May	Chung Shan (Chinese Taipei)	3–1	(Vietnam) Giấy Bãi Bằng	25–22	23–25	25–15	25–10		98–72

=== 7th place ===
Date		Score		Set 1	Set 2	Set 3	Set 4	Set 5	Total
27 May	Jakarta (Indonesia)	1–3	(Vietnam) Giấy Bãi Bằng						

=== 5th place ===
Date		Score		Set 1	Set 2	Set 3	Set 4	Set 5	Total
27 May	Australia Institute of Sport	1–3	(Chinese Taipei) Chung Shan	25–21	17–25	23–25	13–25		78–96

== Final round ==
Semifinals
26 May – Bangkok
(Thailand) BEC World	3
(China) Shanghai	0
26 May – Bangkok
(Japan) Hisamitsu	3
(Kazakhstan) Rahat	0

Final
27 May – Bangkok
(Thailand) BEC World	0
(Japan) Hisamitsu	3
3rd place
27 May – Bangkok
(China) Shanghai	1
(Kazakhstan) Rahat	3

=== Semifinals ===
Date		Score		Set 1	Set 2	Set 3	Set 4	Set 5	Total
26 May	BEC World (Thailand)	3–0	(China) Shanghai	25–17	25–14	29–27			79–58
26 May	Hisamitsu Springs (Japan)	3–0	(Kazakhstan) Rahat Almaty	25–14	25–20	25–15			75–49

=== 3rd place ===
Date		Score		Set 1	Set 2	Set 3	Set 4	Set 5	Total
27 May	Shanghai (China)	1–3	(Kazakhstan) Rahat Almaty	12–25	25–21	19–25	23–25		79–96

=== Final ===
Date		Score		Set 1	Set 2	Set 3	Set 4	Set 5	Total
27 May	BEC World (Thailand)	0–3	(Japan) Hisamitsu Springs	20–25	12–25	12–25			44–75

== Final standing ==
Rank	Team
1st place, gold medalist(s)	(Japan) Hisamitsu Springs
2nd place, silver medalist(s)	(Thailand) BEC World
3rd place, bronze medalist(s)	(Kazakhstan) Rahat Almaty
4	(China) Shanghai
5	(Chinese Taipei) Chung Shan
6	Australia Institute of Sport
7	(Vietnam) Giấy Bãi Bằng
8	(Indonesia) Jakarta

== Awards ==
- MVP: (Japan) Keiko Hara (Hisamitsu)
- Best server: (Thailand) Piyamas Koijapo (BEC World)
- Best spiker: (Japan) Kumiko Sakino (Hisamitsu)
- Best blocker: (Japan) Kumiko Sakino (Hisamitsu)
- Best libero: (Japan) Sachiko Takahashi (Hisamitsu)
- Best setter: (Japan) Keiko Hara (Hisamitsu)
