= Asian Club Volleyball Championships =

Asian Club Volleyball Championships may refer to:

- Asian Men's Club Volleyball Championship, the competition for men
- Asian Women's Club Volleyball Championship, the competition for women
