= Ana Bjelica =

Serbian volleyball player (born 1992)

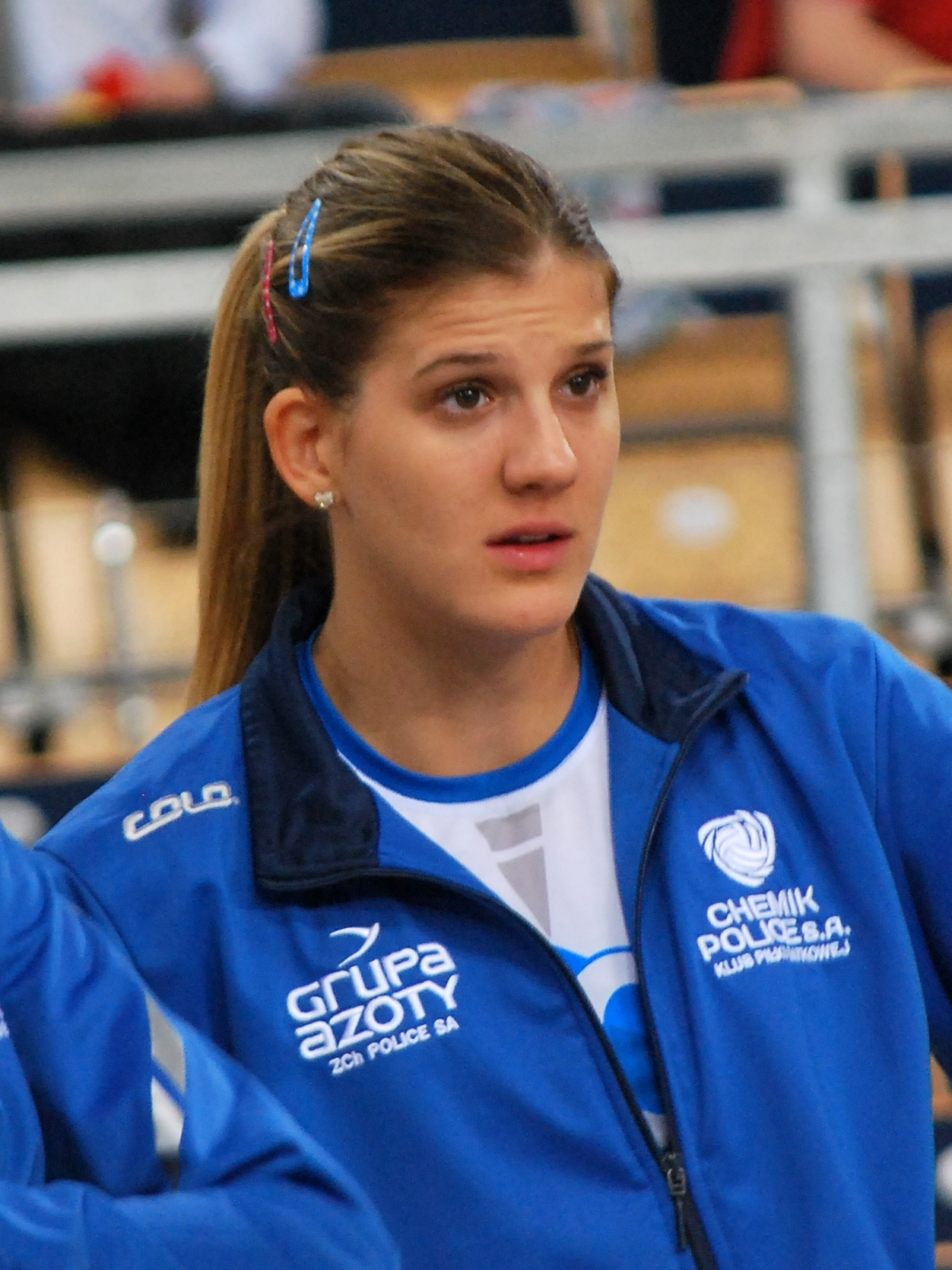
- Bjelica in 2014

Personal information
- Nationality: Serbian
- Born: 3 April 1992 (age 34); Belgrade, Serbia, SFR Yugoslavia
- Height: 1.90 m (6 ft 3 in)
- Weight: 78 kg (172 lb)
- Spike: 310 cm (122 in)
- Block: 305 cm (120 in)

Volleyball information
- Position: Opposite
- Current club: CSM Târgovişte

Career
Years	Teams
2008–2013; 2013–2015; 2015–2016; 2016–2017; 2017–2018; 2018–2019; 2019–2020; 2020–2021; 2021; 2021; 2021–2022; 2022–	Crvena zvezda Chemik Police; Salihli Belediyespor; Vôlei Nestlé Osasco; Crvena zvezda Volero Le Cannet; Osasco Audax; Beijing BAIC Motor; Železničar Lajkovac; Radomka Radom; Megabox Volley Vallefoglia; CSM Târgovişte

National team
Serbia
Honours
Women's volleyball
Representing Serbia
Olympic Games
Bronze medal – third place	2020 Tokyo	Team
World Championship
Gold medal – first place	2018 Japan	Team
Gold medal – first place	2022 Netherlands/Poland	Team
European Championship
Gold medal – first place	2019 Turkey
Gold medal – first place	2017 Azerbaijan/Georgia
Silver medal – second place	2021 Serbia/Croatia/Bulgaria/Romania
Silver medal – second place	2023 Belgium/Estonia/Germany/Italy
Bronze medal – third place	2015 Netherlands/Belgium
World Cup
Silver medal – second place	2015 Japan
FIVB World Grand Prix
Bronze medal – third place	2013 Sapporo
Bronze medal – third place	2017 Nanjing
European Games
Bronze medal – third place	2015 Baku	Team
European League
Gold medal – first place	2010 Ankara
FIVB Nations League
Bronze medal – third place	2022 Ankara	Team

Ana Bjelica (Serbian: Ана Бјелица; born 3 April 1992) is a Serbian volleyball player who plays for CSM Târgovişte. She is younger sister of basketball players Milko and Milka Bjelica. Her family is Serbian Montenegrin, but, contrary to her siblings, she decided to represent native Serbia instead of Montenegro.

In 2020, Bjelica signed for the Chinese team Beijing BAIC Motor, but did not play due to the COVID-19 pandemic. She returned to the Serbian team Železničar Lajkovac and won the 2021 Serbian Cup, and then joined Polish Radom Radomka in the playoff.

== Achievements ==
=== Clubs ===
- CEV Cup runner-up: 2009/10
- Serbian volleyball league: 2009/10, 2010/11, 2011/12, 2012/13
- Polish volleyball league: 2013/14
- Serbian Volleyball Cup: 2009/10, 2010/11, 2011/12, 2012/13
- Polish Volleyball Cup: 2013/14
- Campeonato Paulista: 2016
- Brazilian Superliga runner-up: 2016/2017

=== Individual Awards ===
- 2010 European Junior Championship - The best scorer
- 2014 Polish Cup - The best attacker
