= Team Accel =

Women's volleyball team in the Philippines

- Full name: Team Accel Philippines
- Short name: Accel
- Founded: 2006
- Dissolved: 2006
- Head coach: Constante Reyes
- Captain: Cherry Rose Macatangay

Team Accel was a Philippine women's volleyball club which participated at the 2006 Asian Women's Club Volleyball Championship.

== Background ==
The Philippines designated Team Accel as its representative team at the 2006 Asian Women's Club Volleyball Championship when the country first participated in the tournament now known as the AVC Women's Champions League. The country also hosted the 2006 edition.

Team Accel is sponsored by Philippine sportwear firm Sporteum Philippines, Inc. and is named after Sporteum's brand Accel. Accel was coached by Constante Reyes and captained by Cherry Rose Macatangay. They only trained for a month prior to the 2006 Asian tournament due to some of their players being from the V-League

== Fixtures ==
Date	Time		Score		Set 1	Set 2	Set 3	Set 4	Set 5	Total
May 24	18:00	Accel (Philippines)	3–0	Garuda Indonesia	26–24	25–13	26–24			77–61
May 25	14:00	Chung Shan (Chinese Taipei)	3–0	(Philippines) Accel	25–18	25–13	25–15			75–46
May 26	16:00	Accel (Philippines)	0–3	(Japan) Hisamitsu Springs	16–25	15–25	16–25			47–75
May 28	14:00	Rahat CSKA (Kazakhstan)	3–0	(Philippines) Accel	25–20	25–17	25–17			75–54
May 30	16:00	Accel (Philippines)	0–3	(China) Tianjin Bridgestone	11–25	14–25	17–25			42–75
May 31	18:00	Sang Som (Thailand)	3–0	(Philippines) Accel	25–11	25–21	25–13			75–45

Source: AVC
