= Tianhai =

Tianhai may refer to:

- Tianjin Tianhai Investment (Chinese: 天津天海投资发展), former name of HNA Technology Co., Ltd., a Chinese listed company
- Tianjin Tianhai F.C. (Chinese: 天津天海足球俱乐部; pinyin: Tiānjīn Tiānhǎi Zúqiú Jùlèbù), a Chinese football club
- Wang Tianhai (Chinese: 王田海; pinyin: Wáng Tiánhǎi), member of the 11th National People's Congress of China

== See also ==
- Tenkai, a Japanese monk who also called 天海
- tiánhǎi (Chinese: 填海): Land reclamation
