= Park Soo-jeong =

Park Soo-jeong may refer to:

- Park Soo-jeong (volleyball)
- Park Soo-jeong (footballer)
