= Lin Chun-yi =

Lin Chun-yi may refer to:

- Lin Chun-yi (badminton) (born 1999), Taiwanese badminton player
- Lin Chun-yi (volleyball) (born 1983), Taiwanese volleyball player
- Edgar Lin (1938–2025), Taiwanese biologist, diplomat, and politician
