= PLDT volleyball teams =

PLDT has owned and/or sponsored multiple volleyball teams, including:

- PLDT High Speed Hitters, PLDT's current women's volleyball team
- PLDT women's volleyball team (2013–2018), merged with the now-High Speed Hitters in 2018
- PLDT men's volleyball team, played from 2013 to 2019
- Smart–Maynilad Net Spikers, played in 2013
- PLDT Home TVolution, name of the 2014 Asian Club Volleyball Championship teams in both men and women
