= 2014 Asian Women's Club Volleyball Championship =

2014 Asian Club Championship

Tournament details
- Host country: Thailand
- Dates: 17–25 April
- Teams: 10
- Venue: 1 (in 1 host city)

Final positions
- Champions: (Japan) Hisamitsu Springs (2nd title)

Tournament awards
- MVP: (Japan) Miyu Nagaoka

The 2014 Asian Women's Club Volleyball Championship was the 15th staging of the AVC Club Championships. The tournament was held in Nakhon Pathom, Thailand.

== Pools composition ==
The teams are seeded based on their final ranking at the 2013 Asian Women's Club Volleyball Championship.

Pool A	Pool B
Thailand (Host); Japan (3rd); Vietnam; ~~Turkmenistan~~ * Iran	China (1st); Kazakhstan (2nd); Singapore; Philippines; India; Chinese Taipei

* Withdrew

== Preliminary round ==
=== Pool A ===
Pos	Team	Pld	W	L	Pts	SW	SL	SR	SPW	SPL	SPR	Qualification
1	(Japan) Hisamitsu Springs	3	3	0	9	9	0	MAX	225	131	1.718	Quarterfinals
2	(Thailand) Nakhon Ratchasima	3	1	2	4	5	6	0.833	231	227	1.018	Quarterfinals
3	(Vietnam) Thông tin LienVietPostBank	3	1	2	3	5	8	0.625	246	270	0.911	Quarterfinals
4	(Iran) Matin Varamin	3	1	2	2	3	8	0.375	179	253	0.708	Quarterfinals

Date	Time		Score		Set 1	Set 2	Set 3	Set 4	Set 5	Total	Report
17 Apr	16:00	Nakhon Ratchasima (Thailand)	3–0	(Iran) Matin Varamin	25–16	25–17	25–14			75–47	Report
18 Apr	18:00	Thông tin LVPB (Vietnam)	0–3	(Japan) Hisamitsu Springs	8–25	14–25	16–25			38–75	Report
19 Apr	18:00	Matin Varamin (Iran)	0–3	(Japan) Hisamitsu Springs	13–25	14–25	9–25			36–75	Report
20 Apr	18:00	Nakhon Ratchasima (Thailand)	2–3	(Vietnam) Thông tin LVPB	16–25	23–25	25–20	25–20	10–15	99–105	Report
21 Apr	16:00	Matin Varamin (Iran)	3–2	(Vietnam) Thông tin LVPB	25–23	16–25	25–21	15–25	15–9	96–103	Report
21 Apr	18:00	Hisamitsu Springs (Japan)	3–0	(Thailand) Nakhon Ratchasima	25–18	25–18	25–21			75–57	Report

=== Pool B ===
Pos	Team	Pld	W	L	Pts	SW	SL	SR	SPW	SPL	SPR	Qualification
1	(China) Tianjin Bohai Bank	5	5	0	15	15	1	15.000	399	233	1.712	Quarterfinals
2	(Kazakhstan) Zhetyssu Taldykorgan	5	4	1	12	12	4	3.000	380	284	1.338	Quarterfinals
3	Chinese Taipei	5	3	2	9	11	6	1.833	374	300	1.247	Quarterfinals
4	(Philippines) PLDT HOME TVolution	5	2	3	6	6	9	0.667	292	318	0.918	Quarterfinals
5	(India) KSEB	5	1	4	3	3	12	0.250	247	342	0.722	
6	Singapore	5	0	5	0	0	15	0.000	160	375	0.427	

Date	Time		Score		Set 1	Set 2	Set 3	Set 4	Set 5	Total	Report
17 Apr	11:30	KSEB (India)	0–3	(Philippines) PLDT HOME TVolution	17–25	24–26	16–25			57–76	Report
17 Apr	14:00	Chinese Taipei	3–0	Singapore	25–8	25–7	25–6			75–21	Report
17 Apr	18:00	Zhetyssu Taldykorgan (Kazakhstan)	0–3	(China) Tianjin Bohai Bank	23–25	19–25	15–25			57–75	Report
18 Apr	12:00	KSEB (India)	0–3	Chinese Taipei	12–25	16–25	16–25			44–75	Report
18 Apr	14:00	Zhetyssu Taldykorgan (Kazakhstan)	3–0	Singapore	25–14	25–14	25–9			75–37	Report
18 Apr	16:00	Tianjin Bohai Bank (China)	3–0	(Philippines) PLDT HOME TVolution	25–15	25–16	25–17			75–48	Report
19 Apr	12:00	Singapore	0–3	(China) Tianjin Bohai Bank	8–25	5–25	12–25			25–75	Report
19 Apr	14:00	PLDT HOME TVolution (Philippines)	0–3	Chinese Taipei	15–25	12–25	11–25			38–75	Report
19 Apr	16:00	Zhetyssu Taldykorgan (Kazakhstan)	3–0	(India) KSEB	25–12	25–11	25–23			75–46	Report
20 Apr	12:00	PLDT HOME TVolution (Philippines)	0–3	(Kazakhstan) Zhetyssu Taldykorgan	21–25	13–25	21–25			55–75	Report
20 Apr	14:00	Singapore	0–3	(India) KSEB	14–25	18–25	9–25			41–75	Report
20 Apr	16:00	Tianjin Bohai Bank (China)	3–1	Chinese Taipei	24–26	25–19	25–15	25–18		99–78	Report
21 Apr	10:00	Chinese Taipei	1–3	(Kazakhstan) Zhetyssu Taldykorgan	21–25	25–23	9–25	16–25		71–98	Report
21 Apr	12:00	KSEB (India)	0–3	(China) Tianjin Bohai Bank	8–25	7–25	10–25			25–75	Report
21 Apr	14:00	Singapore	0–3	(Philippines) PLDT HOME TVolution	8–25	19–25	9–25			36–75	Report

== Classification 9th–10th ==
Date	Time		Score		Set 1	Set 2	Set 3	Set 4	Set 5	Total	Report
24 Apr	10:00	KSEB (India)	3–0	Singapore	25–12	25–17	25–8			75–37	Report

== Final round ==
Quarterfinals
23 April – Nakhon Pathom
(Japan) Hisamitsu	3
(Philippines) PLDT	0
23 April – Nakhon Pathom
(Kazakhstan) Zhetyssu	3
(Vietnam) Thông tin LVPB	1
23 April – Nakhon Pathom
(China) Tianjin	3
(Iran) Matin	0
23 April – Nakhon Pathom
(Thailand) Nakhon Ratchasima	1
Chinese Taipei	3

Semifinals
24 April – Nakhon Pathom
(Japan) Hisamitsu	3
(Kazakhstan) Zhetyssu	0
24 April – Nakhon Pathom
(China) Tianjin	3
Chinese Taipei	0

Final
25 April – Nakhon Pathom
(Japan) Hisamitsu	3
(China) Tianjin	0
3rd place
25 April – Nakhon Pathom
(Kazakhstan) Zhetyssu	3
Chinese Taipei	0

5th–8th places
24 April – Nakhon Pathom
(Philippines) PLDT	0
(Vietnam) Thông tin LVPB	3
24 April – Nakhon Pathom
(Iran) Matin	0
(Thailand) Nakhon Ratchasima	3

5th place
25 April – Nakhon Pathom
(Vietnam) Thông tin LVPB	2
(Thailand) Nakhon Ratchasima	3
7th place
25 April – Nakhon Pathom
(Philippines) PLDT	1
(Iran) Matin	3

=== Quarterfinals ===
Date	Time		Score		Set 1	Set 2	Set 3	Set 4	Set 5	Total	Report
23 Apr	12:00	Hisamitsu Springs (Japan)	3–0	(Philippines) PLDT HOME TVolution	25–7	25–13	25–12			75–32	Report
23 Apr	14:00	Tianjin Bohai Bank (China)	3–0	(Iran) Matin Varamin	25–17	25–9	25–13			75–39	Report
23 Apr	16:00	Nakhon Ratchasima (Thailand)	1–3	Chinese Taipei	25–19	14–25	22–25	25–27		86–96	Report
23 Apr	18:00	Zhetyssu Taldykorgan (Kazakhstan)	3–1	(Vietnam) Thông tin LVPB	25–27	25–19	25–19	25–18		100–83	Report

=== 5th–8th semifinals ===
Date	Time		Score		Set 1	Set 2	Set 3	Set 4	Set 5	Total	Report
24 Apr	12:00	PLDT HOME TVolution (Philippines)	0–3	(Vietnam) Thông tin LVPB	14–25	17–25	15–25			46–75	Report
24 Apr	14:00	Matin Varamin (Iran)	0–3	(Thailand) Nakhon Ratchasima	18–25	21–25	17–25			56–75	Report

=== Semifinals ===
Date	Time		Score		Set 1	Set 2	Set 3	Set 4	Set 5	Total	Report
24 Apr	16:00	Hisamitsu Springs (Japan)	3–0	(Kazakhstan) Zhetyssu Taldykorgan	25–22	25–14	25–14			75–50	Report
24 Apr	18:00	Tianjin Bohai Bank (China)	3–0	Chinese Taipei	25–20	25–12	25–17			75–49	Report

=== 7th place ===
Date	Time		Score		Set 1	Set 2	Set 3	Set 4	Set 5	Total	Report
25 Apr	09:00	PLDT HOME TVolution (Philippines)	1–3	(Iran) Matin Varamin	22–25	16–25	25–18	20–25		83–93	Report

=== 5th place ===
Date	Time		Score		Set 1	Set 2	Set 3	Set 4	Set 5	Total	Report
25 Apr	11:00	Thông tin LVPB (Vietnam)	2–3	(Thailand) Nakhon Ratchasima	25–21	18–25	20–25	25–19	11–15	99–105	Report

=== 3rd place ===
Date	Time		Score		Set 1	Set 2	Set 3	Set 4	Set 5	Total	Report
25 Apr	13:00	Zhetyssu Taldykorgan (Kazakhstan)	3–0	Chinese Taipei	25–15	26–24	25–20			76–59	Report

=== Final ===
Date	Time		Score		Set 1	Set 2	Set 3	Set 4	Set 5	Total	Report
25 Apr	16:00	Hisamitsu Springs (Japan)	3–0	(China) Tianjin Bohai Bank	25–19	25–16	25–19			75–54	Report

== Final standing ==
Rank	Team
1st place, gold medalist(s)	(Japan) Hisamitsu Springs
2nd place, silver medalist(s)	(China) Tianjin Bohai Bank
3rd place, bronze medalist(s)	(Kazakhstan) Zhetyssu Taldykorgan
4	Chinese Taipei
5	(Thailand) Nakhon Ratchasima
6	(Vietnam) Thông tin LienVietPostBank
7	(Iran) Matin Varamin
8	(Philippines) PLDT HOME TVolution
9	(India) KSEB
10	Singapore

Qualified for the 2014 Club World Championship

== Awards ==
- Most Valuable Player

(Japan) Miyu Nagaoka (Hisamitsu Springs)

- Best Setter

(Japan) Chizuru Kotō (Hisamitsu Springs)

- Best Outside Spikers

(Japan) Yuki Ishii (Hisamitsu Springs)
(China) Chen Liyi (Tianjin Bohai Bank)

- Best Middle Blockers

(Japan) Kanako Hirai (Hisamitsu Springs)
(Kazakhstan) Lyudmila Anarbayeva (Zhetyssu Taldykorgan)

- Best Opposite Spiker

(China) Li Ying (Tianjin Bohai Bank)

- Best Libero

(Kazakhstan) Marina Storozhenko (Zhetyssu Taldykorgan)
