= 2006 Asian Women's Club Volleyball Championship =

2006 Asian Club Championship
Tournament details
- Host country: Philippines
- Dates: 24–31 May
- Teams: 7
- Venue: 1 (in 1 host city)

Final positions
- Champions: (China) Tianjin Bridgestone (2nd title)

Tournament awards
- MVP: (China) Wang Li

The 2006 Asian Women's Club Volleyball Championship is an international volleyball tournament held at the Rizal Memorial Coliseum from May 24 to 31, 2006 organized by the Philippine Volleyball Federation. Seven countries participated in the week-long event.

South Korea and North Korea were also invited to send a team.

== Results ==
Pos	Team	Pld	W	L	Pts	SPW	SPL	SPR	SW	SL	SR
1	(China) Tianjin Bridgestone	6	6	0	12	475	338	1.405	18	1	18.000
2	(Chinese Taipei) Chung Shan	6	5	1	11	474	383	1.238	15	5	3.000
3	(Thailand) Sang Som	6	4	2	10	474	398	1.191	13	7	1.857
4	(Kazakhstan) Rahat CSKA	6	3	3	9	458	464	0.987	11	10	1.100
5	(Japan) Hisamitsu Springs	6	2	4	8	397	437	0.908	7	12	0.583
6	(Philippines) Accel	6	1	5	7	311	436	0.713	3	15	0.200
7	Garuda Indonesia	6	0	6	6	338	471	0.718	1	18	0.056

Source: AVC

Date	Time		Score		Set 1	Set 2	Set 3	Set 4	Set 5	Total
24 May	14:00	Rahat CSKA (Kazakhstan)	1–3	(Chinese Taipei) Chung Shan	16–25	25–18	21–25	14–25		76–93
24 May	16:00	Tianjin Bridgestone (China)	3–1	(Thailand) Sang Som	23–25	25–19	25–22	26–24		99–90
24 May	18:00	Accel (Philippines)	3–0	Garuda Indonesia	26–24	25–13	26–24			77–61
25 May	14:00	Chung Shan (Chinese Taipei)	3–0	(Philippines) Accel	25–18	25–13	25–15			75–46
25 May	16:00	Garuda Indonesia	0–3	(China) Tianjin Bridgestone	13–25	13–25	13–25			39–75
25 May	18:00	Hisamitsu Springs (Japan)	0–3	(Kazakhstan) Rahat CSKA	20–25	22–25	24–26			66–76
26 May	14:00	Sang Som (Thailand)	3–0	Garuda Indonesia	25–11	25–18	25–21			75–50
26 May	16:00	Accel (Philippines)	0–3	(Japan) Hisamitsu Springs	16–25	15–25	16–25			47–75
26 May	18:00	Tianjin Bridgestone (China)	3–0	(Chinese Taipei) Chung Shan	25–19	25–21	25–16			75–56
27 May	14:00	Rahat CSKA (Kazakhstan)	3–0	(Philippines) Accel	25–20	25–17	25–17			75–54
27 May	16:00	Chung Shan (Chinese Taipei)	3–0	(Thailand) Sang Som	25–21	25–19	25–16			75–56
27 May	18:00	Hisamitsu Springs (Japan)	0–3	(China) Tianjin Bridgestone	19–25	24–26	18–25			61–76
28 May	14:00	Garuda Indonesia	0–3	(Chinese Taipei) Chung Shan	21–25	17–25	14–25			52–75
28 May	16:00	Sang Som (Thailand)	3–0	(Japan) Hisamitsu Springs	25–9	25–10	25–23			75–42
28 May	18:00	Tianjin Bridgestone (China)	3–0	(Kazakhstan) Rahat CSKA	25–15	25–16	25–19			75–50
30 May	14:00	Hisamitsu Springs (Japan)	3–0	Garuda Indonesia	25–21	25–20	25–22			75–63
30 May	16:00	Accel (Philippines)	0–3	(China) Tianjin Bridgestone	11–25	14–25	17–25			42–75
30 May	18:00	Rahat CSKA (Kazakhstan)	1–3	(Thailand) Sang Som	18–25	19–25	30–28	20–25		87–103
31 May	14:00	Chung Shan (Chinese Taipei)	3–1	(Japan) Hisamitsu Springs	25–18	25–11	25–27	25–22		100–78
31 May	16:00	Garuda Indonesia	1–3	(Kazakhstan) Rahat CSKA	18–25	18–25	25–19	12–25		73–94
31 May	18:00	Sang Som (Thailand)	3–0	(Philippines) Accel	25–11	25–21	25–13			75–45

== Final standing ==
Rank	Team
1st place, gold medalist(s)	(China) Tianjin Bridgestone
2nd place, silver medalist(s)	(Chinese Taipei) Chung Shan
3rd place, bronze medalist(s)	(Thailand) Sang Som
4	(Kazakhstan) Rahat CSKA
5	(Japan) Hisamitsu Springs
6	(Philippines) Accel
7	Garuda Indonesia

Source: AVC
