= 2008 FIVB Women's World Olympic Qualification Tournament =

Volleyball tournament

The 2008 FIVB Women's World Olympic Qualification Tournament is a qualification tournament to determine the final four spots for the 2008 Summer Olympics. The qualifying tournament, The round-robin tournament through May 17–25 doubles up as the Asian Olympic Qualification Tournament and so the best three teams plus the best Asian team (even if any of the best three teams are Asian) will book their tickets to Beijing. Hosts Japan will be joined by Thailand, Korea, Kazakhstan (best-ranked teams at the Asian Continental Championship), Serbia, Poland (best world-ranked teams from CEV), Dominican Republic and Puerto Rico (best world-ranked teams from NORCECA).

== Teams ==
- Host: Japan
- Asia: South Korea, Kazakhstan and Thailand
- Europe: Serbia, Poland
- North America: Dominican Republic
- South America or Africa: Puerto Rico*

* The final place for tournament was to be decided by a Playoff between Peru and Kenya, the teams ranked second in the South American and African Qualifiers, but both teams dropped their applications. Uruguay (third in the World Rankings for South America) wasn’t ready to apply, while Egypt (third in the World Rankings among African countries) has not played in any Continental Qualification Tournaments. In these circumstances, the FIVB has chosen Puerto Rico, the best Norceca team in the World Rankings after Dominican Republic.

== Results ==
May 17
Thailand	0 – 3	Dominican Republic	24–26, 22–25, 24–26	11:05
South Korea	3 – 1	Puerto Rico	25–22, 25–16, 21–25, 25–21	13:05
Serbia	3 – 1	Kazakhstan	25–19, 25–12, 23–25, 25–14	15:25
Poland	1 – 3	Japan	20–25, 25–27, 25–19, 17–25	18:00
May 18
Dominican Republic	1 – 3	Serbia	25–23, 25–27, 21–25, 20–25	11:05
South Korea	3 – 2	Thailand	25–20, 28–26, 14–25, 21–25, 18–16	13:25
Kazakhstan	0 – 3	Poland	20–25, 15–25, 19–25	16:00
Puerto Rico	1 – 3	Japan	20–25, 18–25, 25–17, 24–26	18:00
May 20
Thailand	3 – 0	Puerto Rico	25–20, 25–20, 25–20	11:35
Serbia	3 – 0	South Korea	25–23, 25–23, 25–19	13:35
Poland	3 – 1	Dominican Republic	23–25, 25–19, 25–17, 25–23	15:35
Japan	3 – 0	Kazakhstan	25–21, 33–31, 25–21	18:30
May 21
Thailand	0 – 3	Serbia	16–25, 23-25, 15-25	11:35
Puerto Rico	3 – 2	Kazakhstan	25–19, 15–25, 25–22, 23–25, 15–13	13:35
South Korea	0 – 3	Poland	16–25, 19–25, 16–25	16:00
Dominican Republic	1 – 3	Japan	21–25, 25–18, 16–25, 21–25	18:30
May 23
Kazakhstan	0 – 3	Dominican Republic	20–25, 22–25, 17–25	11:35
Serbia	3 – 0	Puerto Rico	25–12, 25–18, 25–18	13:35
Poland	3 – 1	Thailand	18–25, 25–14, 25–19, 25–23	15:35
Japan	3 – 1	South Korea	25–20, 25–19, 21–25, 25–13	18:30
May 24
Puerto Rico	0 – 3	Dominican Republic	23–25, 14–25, 18–25	11:05
Serbia	2 – 3	Poland	18–25, 14–25, 25–18, 25–22, 10–15	13:05
South Korea	0 – 3	Kazakhstan	18–25, 21–25, 21–25	15:25
Thailand	2 – 3	Japan	30–28, 14–25, 27–25, 21–25, 11–15	18:00
May 25
Dominican Republic	3 – 1	South Korea	17–25, 25–20, 25–19, 25–15	11:05
Kazakhstan	3 – 1	Thailand	13–25, 25–18, 25–14, 25–21	13:15
Poland	3 – 0	Puerto Rico	25–22, 25–22, 25–22	15:20
Japan	2 – 3	Serbia	25–19, 25–21, 19–25, 19–25, 17–19	18:00

== Ranking ==
Rk	Team	Points	Won	Lost	PW	PL	Ratio	SW	SL	Ratio
1	Poland	13	6	1	608	524	1.160	19	7	2.714
2	Serbia	13	6	1	624	538	1.160	20	7	2.857
3	Japan	13	6	1	684	619	1.105	20	9	2.222
4	Dominican Republic	11	4	3	577	554	1.042	15	10	1.500
5	Kazakhstan	9	2	5	523	572	0.914	9	16	0.563
6	South Korea	9	2	5	534	609	0.877	8	18	0.444
7	Thailand	8	1	6	573	617	0.929	9	18	0.500
8	Puerto Rico	8	1	6	503	593	0.848	5	20	0.250

- Kazakhstan is counted as The Asian Continental Qualification Tournament Champion since it is the best Asian team outside the top 3.

== Individual awards ==
- Best scorer
  - Karina Ocasio (PUR)
  - Yelena Pavlova (KAZ)
- Best spiker
  - Małgorzata Glinka (POL)
- Best blocker
  - Annerys Vargas (DOM)
- Best server
  - Áurea Cruz (PUR)
- Best digger
  - Yuko Sano (JPN)
- Best setter
  - Yoshie Takeshita (JPN)
- Best receiver
  - Yuko Sano (JPN)
