= 2007 Asian Women's Club Volleyball Championship =

2007 Asian Club Championship
Tournament details
- Host country: Vietnam
- Dates: 16–23 June
- Teams: 7
- Venue: 1 (in 1 host city)

Final positions
- Champions: (Kazakhstan) Rahat CSKA (2nd title)

Tournament awards
- MVP: (Kazakhstan) Yelena Pavlova

The 2007 Asian Women's Club Volleyball Championship was the 8th staging of the AVC Club Championships. The tournament was held in Vĩnh Yên, Vĩnh Phúc Province, Vietnam.

== Results ==
| Pos | Team | Pld | W | L | Pts | SW | SL | SR | SPW | SPL | SPR |
|---|---|---|---|---|---|---|---|---|---|---|---|
| 1 | (Kazakhstan) Rahat CSKA | 7 | 7 | 0 | 14 | 21 | 2 | 10.500 | 566 | 397 | 1.426 |
| 2 | (Thailand) Sang Som | 7 | 6 | 1 | 13 | 19 | 6 | 3.167 | 604 | 484 | 1.248 |
| 3 | (Japan) Hisamitsu Springs | 7 | 5 | 2 | 12 | 16 | 8 | 2.000 | 566 | 493 | 1.148 |
| 4 | (North Korea) Sobaeksu | 7 | 4 | 3 | 11 | 14 | 12 | 1.167 | 569 | 528 | 1.078 |
| 5 | (Vietnam) Sports Center 1 | 7 | 3 | 4 | 10 | 12 | 13 | 0.923 | 532 | 518 | 1.027 |
| 6 | (China) Dalian Huanyu | 7 | 2 | 5 | 9 | 10 | 15 | 0.667 | 542 | 531 | 1.021 |
| 7 | Garuda Indonesia | 7 | 1 | 6 | 8 | 3 | 18 | 0.167 | 313 | 504 | 0.621 |
| 8 | (Uzbekistan) Toumaris SKIF | 7 | 0 | 7 | 7 | 0 | 21 | 0.000 | 288 | 525 | 0.549 |

| Date | Time | | Score | | Set 1 | Set 2 | Set 3 | Set 4 | Set 5 | Total |
|---|---|---|---|---|---|---|---|---|---|---|
| 16 Jun | 14:00 | Toumaris SKIF (Uzbekistan) | 0–3 | (China) Dalian Huanyu | 8–25 | 10–25 | 12–25 | | | 30–75 |
| 16 Jun | 16:00 | Rahat CSKA (Kazakhstan) | 3–0 | (Japan) Hisamitsu Springs | 25–21 | 28–26 | 25–16 | | | 78–63 |
| 16 Jun | 19:00 | Garuda Indonesia | 0–3 | (Vietnam) Sports Center 1 | 21–25 | 10–25 | 10–25 | | | 41–75 |
| 16 Jun | 21:00 | Sobaeksu (North Korea) | 1–3 | (Thailand) Sang Som | 15–25 | 21–25 | 25–19 | 15–25 | | 76–94 |
| 17 Jun | 14:00 | Garuda Indonesia | 0–3 | (Japan) Hisamitsu Springs | 16–25 | 13–25 | 18–25 | | | 47–75 |
| 17 Jun | 16:00 | Toumaris SKIF (Uzbekistan) | 0–3 | (Kazakhstan) Rahat CSKA | 16–25 | 6–25 | 5–25 | | | 27–75 |
| 17 Jun | 19:00 | Sang Som (Thailand) | 3–0 | (Vietnam) Sports Center 1 | 25–22 | 25–18 | 25–17 | | | 75–57 |
| 17 Jun | 21:00 | Sobaeksu (North Korea) | 3–2 | (China) Dalian Huanyu | 25–23 | 19–25 | 23–25 | 25–14 | 15–10 | 107–97 |
| 18 Jun | 14:00 | Garuda Indonesia | 3–0 | (Uzbekistan) Toumaris SKIF | 25–20 | 25–16 | 25–18 | | | 75–54 |
| 18 Jun | 16:00 | Sobaeksu (North Korea) | 0–3 | (Kazakhstan) Rahat CSKA | 23–25 | 20–25 | 18–25 | | | 61–75 |
| 18 Jun | 19:00 | Dalian Huanyu (China) | 1–3 | (Thailand) Sang Som | 26–24 | 23–25 | 25–27 | 18–25 | | 92–101 |
| 18 Jun | 21:00 | Sports Center 1 (Vietnam) | 1–3 | (Japan) Hisamitsu Springs | 15–25 | 19–25 | 25–20 | 22–25 | | 81–95 |
| 20 Jun | 14:00 | Dalian Huanyu (China) | 0–3 | (Kazakhstan) Rahat CSKA | 18–25 | 25–27 | 17–25 | | | 60–75 |
| 20 Jun | 16:00 | Sang Som (Thailand) | 3–1 | (Japan) Hisamitsu Springs | 25–13 | 28–30 | 25–19 | 25–21 | | 103–83 |
| 20 Jun | 19:00 | Sports Center 1 (Vietnam) | 3–0 | (Uzbekistan) Toumaris SKIF | 25–13 | 25–10 | 25–19 | | | 75–42 |
| 20 Jun | 21:00 | Sobaeksu (North Korea) | 3–0 | Garuda Indonesia | 25–8 | 25–11 | 25–9 | | | 75–28 |
| 21 Jun | 14:00 | Rahat CSKA (Kazakhstan) | 3–1 | (Thailand) Sang Som | 25–22 | 25–23 | 20–25 | 25–11 | | 95–81 |
| 21 Jun | 16:00 | Hisamitsu Springs (Japan) | 3–0 | (Uzbekistan) Toumaris SKIF | 25–13 | 25–12 | 25–15 | | | 75–40 |
| 21 Jun | 19:00 | Dalian Huanyu (China) | 3–0 | Garuda Indonesia | 25–16 | 25–12 | 25–18 | | | 75–46 |
| 21 Jun | 21:00 | Sports Center 1 (Vietnam) | 1–3 | (North Korea) Sobaeksu | 17–25 | 25–16 | 21–25 | 16–25 | | 79–91 |
| 22 Jun | 14:00 | Sang Som (Thailand) | 3–0 | (Uzbekistan) Toumaris SKIF | 25–13 | 25–12 | 25–15 | | | 75–40 |
| 22 Jun | 16:00 | Rahat CSKA (Kazakhstan) | 3–0 | Garuda Indonesia | 25–11 | 25–13 | 25–11 | | | 75–35 |
| 22 Jun | 19:00 | Hisamitsu Springs (Japan) | 3–1 | (North Korea) Sobaeksu | 25–18 | 25–16 | 23–25 | 27–25 | | 100–84 |
| 22 Jun | 21:00 | Dalian Huanyu (China) | 1–3 | (Vietnam) Sports Center 1 | 25–20 | 23–25 | 17–25 | 18–25 | | 83–95 |
| 23 Jun | 14:00 | Garuda Indonesia | 0–3 | (Thailand) Sang Som | 9–25 | 16–25 | 16–25 | | | 41–75 |
| 23 Jun | 16:00 | Toumaris SKIF (Uzbekistan) | 0–3 | (North Korea) Sobaeksu | 18–25 | 15–25 | 22–25 | | | 55–75 |
| 23 Jun | 19:00 | Rahat CSKA (Kazakhstan) | 3–1 | (Vietnam) Sports Center 1 | 25–12 | 16–25 | 25–20 | 25–13 | | 91–70 |
| 23 Jun | 21:00 | Hisamitsu Springs (Japan) | 3–0 | (China) Dalian Huanyu | 25–20 | 25–19 | 25–21 | | | 75–60 |

== Final standing ==
| Rank | Team |
|---|---|
| 1st place, gold medalist(s) | (Kazakhstan) Rahat CSKA |
| 2nd place, silver medalist(s) | (Thailand) Sang Som |
| 3rd place, bronze medalist(s) | (Japan) Hisamitsu Springs |
| 4 | (North Korea) Sobaeksu |
| 5 | (Vietnam) Sports Center 1 |
| 6 | (China) Dalian Huanyu |
| 7 | Garuda Indonesia |
| 8 | (Uzbekistan) Toumaris SKIF |

== Awards ==
- MVP: (Kazakhstan) Yelena Pavlova (Rahat)
- Best scorer: (Vietnam) Nguyễn Thị Ngọc Hoa (Sport Center 1)
- Best server: (Thailand) Pleumjit Thinkaow (Sang Som)
- Best spiker: (Kazakhstan) Yelena Pavlova (Rahat)
- Best blocker: (Vietnam) Nguyễn Thị Ngọc Hoa (Sport Center 1)
- Best receiver: (Japan) Yuko Sano (Hisamitsu)
- Best setter: (Thailand) Nootsara Tomkom (Sang Som)
- Best digger: (Thailand) Wanna Buakaew (Sang Som)
- Miss Volleyball: (Uzbekistan) Anastasia Bezzubtseva (SKIF)
