= Yūko Sano =

Japanese volleyball player (born 1979)

Yuko Sano
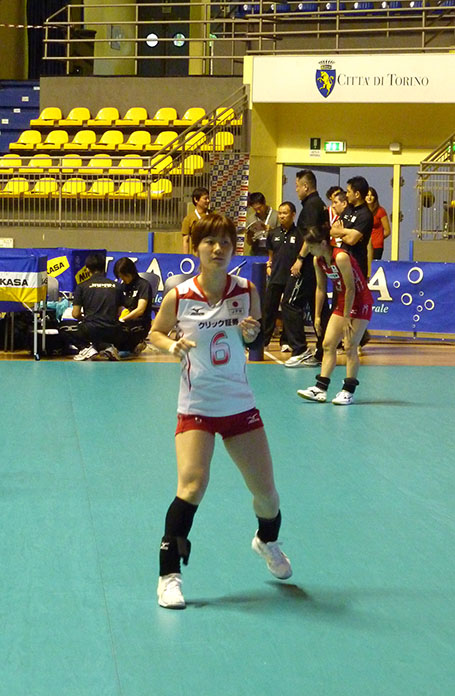
- Sano in 2010

Personal information
- Full name: Yuko Sano
- Nickname: Ryo
- Born: July 26, 1979 (age 47); Takatsuki, Osaka, Japan
- Height: 159 cm (5 ft 3 in)
- Weight: 53 kg (117 lb)
- Spike: 270 cm (106 in)
- Block: 260 cm (102 in)

Volleyball information
- Position: Libero
- Current club: officially retired

National team
Japan
Medal record
Women's volleyball
Representing Japan
Olympic Games
Bronze medal – third place	2012 London	Team
World Championship
Bronze medal – third place	2010 Japan	Team
World Grand Prix
Silver medal – second place	2014 Tokyo	Team
Asian Championship
Gold medal – first place	2007 Suphanburi
Silver medal – second place	2011 Taipei
Bronze medal – third place	2009 Hanoi

Yuko Sano (佐野 優子, Sano Yuko; born July 26, 1979 in Takatsuki, Osaka) is a retired volleyball player from Japan. She was part of the Japanese team that won the bronze medal at the 2012 Summer Olympics.

She played as a libero for the Women's National Team at the 2008 Olympic Qualification Tournament in Japan. There the team ended up in third place, and qualified for the 2008 Summer Olympics. Afterwards Sano was named Best Digger and Best Receiver at the event.

== Career ==
Sano played at the 2013 Club World Championship with Voléro Zürich and she was selected Best Libero. Her team lost the bronze medal to Guangdong Evergrande.

== Clubs ==
- (Japan) Kitasaga High School
- (Japan) Unitika (1998–2000)
- (Japan) Toray Arrows (2000–2003)
- (France) RC Cannes (2004–2006)
- (Japan) Hisamitsu Springs (2006–2010)
- (Azerbaijan) Igtisadchi Baku (2010-2012)
- (Turkey) Galatasaray Daikin (2012-2013)
- (Switzerland) Voléro Zürich (2013-2014)
- (Japan) Denso Airybees (2013-2014)

== Awards ==
=== Individuals ===
- 2003 9th V.League : Best Libero award, Servereceive award.
- 2006 Women's CEV Champions League : Best Libero award.
- 2007 2006-07 V.Premier League : Best Libero award.
- 2007 Asian Club Championship "Best Receiver"
- 2007 14th Asian Women's Volleyball Championship : Best Receiver award
- 2007 Volleyball World Cup : Best Receiver award, Best Digger award.
- 2008 2007-08 V.Premier League : Best Libero award, Servereceive award
- 2008 FIVB World Grand Prix "Best Libero"
- 2008 Olympic Qualifier "Best Digger"
- 2008 Olympic Qualifier "Best Receiver"
- 2009 2008-09 V.Premier League : Best Libero award, Servereceive award, Excellent Player award
- 2011 World Cup "Best Digger"
- 2012-13 CEV Champions League "Best Receiver"
- 2013 FIVB Women's Club World Championship "Best Libero"
- 2014 FIVB World Grand Prix "Best Libero"
- 2014 FIVB World Grand Prix "Most Valuable Player"

=== Team ===
- 2006-07 V.Premier League - Champion, with Hisamitsu Springs.
- 2007 Kurowashiki All Japan Volleyball Championship - Champion, with Hisamitsu Springs.
- 2007 Asian Club Championship - Bronze Medal with Hisamitsu Springs
- 2007-08 Empress's Cup - Runner-Up, with Hisamitsu Springs.
- 2008-09 V.Premier League - Runner-Up, with Hisamitsu Springs.
- 2009 Empress's Cup - Champion, with Hisamitsu Springs.
- 2009 Kurowashiki All Japan Volleyball Championship - Runner-Up, with Hisamitsu Springs.
- 2012 Turkish Volleyball Super Cup - Runner-Up, with Galatasaray Daikin
- 2012-2013 Turkish Women's Volleyball Cup - Bronze Medal with Galatasaray Daikin

=== National team ===
==== Senior team ====
- 2007 Asian Championship - Gold medal
- 2009 Asian Championship - Bronze medal
- 2010 World Championship - Bronze medal
- 2011 Asian Championship - Silver medal
- 2012 Olympics - Bronze medal
- 2014 FIVB World Grand Prix - Silver medal

Awards
Preceded by (China) Zhang Xian (Brazil) Fabiana de Oliveira	Best Libero of FIVB World Grand Prix; 2008; 2014	Succeeded by (Germany) Kerstin Tzscherlich (Russia) Anna Malova
Preceded by (Brazil) Thaísa Menezes	Most Valuable Player of FIVB World Grand Prix; 2014	Succeeded by (United States) Karsta Lowe
