= Guohua Life =

Chinese life insurance company

Guohua Life Insurance
- Company type: subsidiary (by ownership); company limited by shares (by legal form)
- Industry: Financial services
- Founded: November 2007; 18 years ago
- Headquarters: Shanghai, China
- Services: life insurance
- Net income: CN¥1.654 billion (2016)
- Total assets: ▲CN¥110.171 billion (2016)
- Total equity: ▲CN¥13.222 billion (2016)
Owner
Biocause Pharmaceutical	(51%)
- Parent: Biocause Pharmaceutical

Chinese name
- Simplified Chinese: 国华人寿保险股份有限公司
- Literal meaning: Guohua Life Insurance Co., Ltd. by Shares
Transcriptions

Chinese short name
- Simplified Chinese: 国华人寿
- Literal meaning: Guohua Life Insurance
Transcriptions
- Website: www.95549.cn
- Footnotes / references in consolidated financial statement

Guohua Life Insurance Co., Ltd. is a Chinese life insurance company headquartered in Shanghai. Since 2016, the company was a subsidiary (51%) of Biocause Pharmaceutical (SZSE: 000627), after the acquisition of the shares was approved by the China Insurance Regulatory Commission in the same year. The deal was announced in 2015.

== Equity investments ==
- HNA Technology (14.33% as insurance-linked equity fund manager)

== Sponsorship ==
Guohua Life was the naming rights sponsor of a Shanghai-based women volleyball team from 2011 to circa 2013.
