= 2005 Asian Women's Club Volleyball Championship =

2005 Asian Club Championship
Tournament details
- Host country: Vietnam
- Dates: 23–30 May
- Teams: 7
- Venue: 1 (in 1 host city)

Final positions
- Champions: (China) Tianjin Bridgestone (1st title)

Tournament awards
- MVP: (China) Li Shan

The 2005 Asian Women's Club Volleyball Championship was the 6th staging of the AVC Club Championships. The tournament was held in Ninh Bình, Vietnam.

== Results ==
Pos	Team	Pld	W	L	Pts	SW	SL	SR	SPW	SPL	SPR
1	(China) Tianjin Bridgestone	6	6	0	12	18	3	6.000	509	353	1.442
2	(Chinese Taipei) Chung Shan	6	4	2	10	14	7	2.000	498	426	1.169
3	(South Korea) Korea Highway Corporation	6	4	2	10	13	8	1.625	471	413	1.140
4	(Kazakhstan) Rahat CSKA	6	3	3	9	12	11	1.091	493	505	0.976
5	(Thailand) Sang Som	6	2	4	8	8	13	0.615	459	460	0.998
6	(Vietnam) Sports Center 1	6	2	4	8	8	13	0.615	422	472	0.894
7	(Uzbekistan) Toumaris SKIF	6	0	6	6	0	18	0.000	227	450	0.504

Date	Time		Score		Set 1	Set 2	Set 3	Set 4	Set 5	Total
23 May	16:00	Chung Shan (Chinese Taipei)	1–3	(China) Tianjin Bridgestone	23–25	17–25	26–24	18–25		84–99
23 May	18:30	Toumaris SKIF (Uzbekistan)	0–3	(Vietnam) Sports Center 1	21–25	14–25	10–25			45–75
23 May	20:30	Rahat CSKA (Kazakhstan)	0–3	(South Korea) Korea Highway Corporation	16–25	16–25	18–25			50–75
24 May	16:00	Tianjin Bridgestone (China)	3–0	(Uzbekistan) Toumaris SKIF	25–4	25–10	25–9			75–23
24 May	18:00	Sang Som (Thailand)	0–3	(Chinese Taipei) Chung Shan	20–25	19–25	17–25			56–75
24 May	20:00	Sports Center 1 (Vietnam)	3–1	(Kazakhstan) Rahat CSKA	25–20	25–20	19–25	26–24		95–89
25 May	16:00	Toumaris SKIF (Uzbekistan)	0–3	(Thailand) Sang Som	10–25	6–25	16–25			32–75
25 May	18:00	Rahat CSKA (Kazakhstan)	2–3	(China) Tianjin Bridgestone	14–25	25–22	25–20	11–25	12–15	87–107
25 May	20:00	Korea Highway Corporation (South Korea)	3–1	(Vietnam) Sports Center 1	17–25	25–18	25–14	25–12		92–69
26 May	16:00	Chung Shan (Chinese Taipei)	3–0	(Uzbekistan) Toumaris SKIF	25–10	25–9	25–16			75–35
26 May	18:00	Tianjin Bridgestone (China)	3–0	(South Korea) Korea Highway Corporation	25–14	25–14	25–15			75–43
26 May	20:00	Sang Som (Thailand)	1–3	(Kazakhstan) Rahat CSKA	23–25	25–20	21–25	14–25		83–95
28 May	16:00	Rahat CSKA (Kazakhstan)	3–1	(Chinese Taipei) Chung Shan	22–25	25–22	25–23	25–19		97–89
28 May	18:00	Korea Highway Corporation (South Korea)	3–1	(Thailand) Sang Som	25–18	25–19	24–26	25–20		99–83
28 May	20:00	Sports Center 1 (Vietnam)	0–3	(China) Tianjin Bridgestone	17–25	17–25	16–25			50–75
29 May	16:00	Toumaris SKIF (Uzbekistan)	0–3	(Kazakhstan) Rahat CSKA	18–25	15–25	23–25			56–75
29 May	18:00	Chung Shan (Chinese Taipei)	3–1	(South Korea) Korea Highway Corporation	23–25	25–20	25–17	27–25		100–87
29 May	20:00	Sang Som (Thailand)	3–1	(Vietnam) Sports Center 1	21–25	25–15	25–20	25–21		96–81
30 May	16:00	Korea Highway Corporation (South Korea)	3–0	(Uzbekistan) Toumaris SKIF	25–18	25–8	25–10			75–36
30 May	18:00	Sports Center 1 (Vietnam)	0–3	(Chinese Taipei) Chung Shan	18–25	14–25	20–25			52–75
30 May	20:00	Tianjin Bridgestone (China)	3–0	(Thailand) Sang Som	25–19	25–21	28–26			78–66

== Final standing ==
Rank	Team
1st place, gold medalist(s)	(China) Tianjin Bridgestone
2nd place, silver medalist(s)	(Chinese Taipei) Chung Shan
3rd place, bronze medalist(s)	(South Korea) Korea Highway Corporation
4	(Kazakhstan) Rahat CSKA
5	(Thailand) Sang Som
6	(Vietnam) Sports Center 1
7	(Uzbekistan) Toumaris SKIF

== Awards ==
- MVP: (China) Li Shan (Tianjin)
- Best scorer: (China) Li Shan (Tianjin)
- Best server: (Thailand) Amporn Hyapha (Sang Som)
- Best spiker: (China) Wang Li (Tianjin)
- Best blocker: (Chinese Taipei) Lin Chun-yi (Chung Shan)
- Best receiver: (South Korea) Kim Hae-Ran (Korea)
- Best setter: (Chinese Taipei) Wu Hsiao-li (Chung Shan)
- Best digger: (Chinese Taipei) Szu Hui-fang (Chung Shan)
