= 2001 AVC Cup Women's Club Tournament =

2001 Asian Club Tournament
Tournament details
- Host country: Vietnam
- Dates: 15–20 May
- Teams: 8
- Venue: 1 (in 1 host city)

Final positions
- Champions: (China) Shanghai (2nd title)

Tournament awards
- MVP: (China) Shen Hong

The 2001 AVC Cup Women's Club Tournament was the 3rd staging of the AVC Club Championships. The tournament was held in Ho Chi Minh City, Vietnam.

== Final standing ==
Rank	Team
1st place, gold medalist(s)	(China) Shanghai
2nd place, silver medalist(s)	(Japan) Hisamitsu Springs
3rd place, bronze medalist(s)	(Thailand) Aero Thai
4	(Kazakhstan) Rahat CSKA
5	(Japan) Toyobo Orchis
6	(Vietnam) Giấy Bãi Bằng
7	Garuda Indonesia
8	(Chinese Taipei) Chia Yi
