= 2000 AVC Cup women's club tournament =

2000 Asian Club Tournament
Tournament details
- Host country: China
- Dates: 7–11 June
- Teams: 6
- Venue: 1 (in 1 host city)

Final positions
- Champions: (China) Shanghai (1st title)

The 2000 AVC Cup Women's Club Tournament was the 2nd staging of the AVC Club Championships. The tournament was held in Shaoxing, China.

== Final standing ==
Rank	Team
1st place, gold medalist(s)	(China) Shanghai
2nd place, silver medalist(s)	(Japan) NEC Red Rockets
3rd place, bronze medalist(s)	(China) Zhejiang Nandu
4	(South Korea) Hyundai E&C Greenfox
5	(Thailand) Aero Thai
6	(Chinese Taipei) Hualien
