= 2004 Asian Women's Club Volleyball Championship =

2004 Asian Club Championship
Tournament details
- Host country: Kazakhstan
- Dates: 20–25 April
- Teams: 6
- Venue: 1 (in 1 host city)

Final positions
- Champions: (Kazakhstan) Rahat Almaty (1st title)

Tournament awards
- MVP: (Kazakhstan) Olga Grushko

The 2004 Asian Women's Club Volleyball Championship was the 5th staging of the AVC Club Championships. The tournament was held in Almaty, Kazakhstan. The local club Rahat Almaty won the championship after finishing tied with 4–1 with the Chinese silver medalists Bayi Yiyang High-Tech District and bronze winners Chung Shan from Chinese Taipei. The result was resolved by the set ratio.

== Results ==
Pos	Team	Pld	W	L	Pts	SW	SL	SR	SPW	SPL	SPR
1	(Kazakhstan) Rahat Almaty	5	4	1	9	13	3	4.333	392	298	1.315
2	(China) Bayi Yiyang High-Tech District	5	4	1	9	14	5	2.800	452	364	1.242
3	(Chinese Taipei) Chung Shan	5	4	1	9	12	6	2.000	405	354	1.144
4	(Kazakhstan) Astana Kanaty	5	2	3	7	8	9	0.889	362	346	1.046
5	(Thailand) BEC World	5	1	4	6	3	12	0.250	294	333	0.883
6	(Uzbekistan) Toumaris SKIF	5	0	5	5	0	15	0.000	165	375	0.440

Date		Score		Set 1	Set 2	Set 3	Set 4	Set 5	Total
20 Apr	BEC World (Thailand)	0–3	(China) Bayi Yiyang High-Tech District	24–26	18–25	17–25			59–76
20 Apr	Chung Shan (Chinese Taipei)	3–1	(Kazakhstan) Astana Kanaty	25–23	17–25	25–19	25–22		92–89
20 Apr	Rahat Almaty (Kazakhstan)	3–0	(Uzbekistan) Toumaris SKIF	25–14	25–16	25–11			75–41
21 Apr	Astana Kanaty (Kazakhstan)	3–0	(Thailand) BEC World	25–19	25–19	25–17			75–55
21 Apr	Toumaris SKIF (Uzbekistan)	0–3	(China) Bayi Yiyang High-Tech District	12–25	13–25	6–25			31–75
21 Apr	Rahat Almaty (Kazakhstan)	3–0	(Chinese Taipei) Chung Shan	25–19	25–18	25–23			75–60
22 Apr	Bayi Yiyang High-Tech District (China)	3–1	(Kazakhstan) Astana Kanaty	25–23	25–9	21–25	25–22		96–79
22 Apr	Chung Shan (Chinese Taipei)	3–0	(Uzbekistan) Toumaris SKIF	25–7	25–13	25–13			75–33
22 Apr	BEC World (Thailand)	0–3	(Kazakhstan) Rahat Almaty	17–25	18–25	16–25			51–75
23 Apr	Chung Shan (Chinese Taipei)	3–0	(Thailand) BEC World	25–22	25–19	25–13			75–54
23 Apr	Toumaris SKIF (Uzbekistan)	0–3	(Kazakhstan) Astana Kanaty	10–25	9–25	9–25			28–75
23 Apr	Rahat Almaty (Kazakhstan)	1–3	(China) Bayi Yiyang High-Tech District	20–25	28–30	25–22	19–25		92–102
24 Apr	BEC World (Thailand)	3–0	(Uzbekistan) Toumaris SKIF	25–17	25–7	25–8			75–32
24 Apr	Bayi Yiyang High-Tech District (China)	2–3	(Chinese Taipei) Chung Shan	25–17	25–20	16–25	24–26	13–15	103–103
24 Apr	Rahat Almaty (Kazakhstan)	3–0	(Kazakhstan) Astana Kanaty	25–14	25–15	25–15			75–44

== Final standing ==
Rank	Team
1st place, gold medalist(s)	(Kazakhstan) Rahat Almaty
2nd place, silver medalist(s)	(China) Bayi Yiyang High-Tech District
3rd place, bronze medalist(s)	(Chinese Taipei) Chung Shan
4	(Kazakhstan) Astana Kanaty
5	(Thailand) BEC World
6	(Uzbekistan) Toumaris SKIF

== Awards ==
- MVP: (Kazakhstan) Olga Grushko (Rahat)
- Best server: (Kazakhstan) Oxana Mikholap (Astana)
- Best blocker: (Kazakhstan) Olga Karpova (Rahat)
- Best receiver: (Uzbekistan) Polina Zborovskaya (Toumaris)
- Best setter: (Chinese Taipei) Wu Hsiao-li (Chung Shan)
- Miss Volleyball: (Thailand) Onuma Sittirak (BEC World)
