= Kanako Hirai =

Japanese volleyball player

Personal information
- Full name: Kanako Hirai
- Nickname: Ann
- Born: April 15, 1984 (age 42); Tsu, Mie, Japan
- Height: 1.83 m (6 ft 0 in)
- Weight: 68 kg (150 lb)
- Spike: 309 cm (122 in)
- Block: 290 cm (114 in)

Volleyball information
- Position: Middle Blocker
- Current club: Hisamitsu Springs
- Number: 9

National team
Japan

Kanako Hirai (平井香菜子 Hirai Kanako, born April 15, 1984) is a Japanese volleyball player who played for Hisamitsu Springs.

On October 1, 2014, Hisamitsu Springs announced her retirement.

== Award ==
=== Individuals ===
- 2014 Asian Club Championship - Best Middle Blocker

=== Clubs ===
- Mie Prefectural Tsushogyo High School → Tsukuba Univ. → Hisamitsu Springs (2007-)
- 2014 Asian Club Championship - Champion, with Hisamitsu Springs.

== National team ==
- The 5th AVC Eastern Zonal Volleyball championships(2006)
- Japan Universiade national team (2007)
- 2013 Asian Championship - Silver medal
