= Kumiko Sakino =

Japanese volleyball player

Personal information
- Full name: Kumiko Sakino
- Nickname: Saki
- Born: September 23, 1975; Hōhoku, Shimonoseki, Yamaguchi, Japan
- Height: 1.80 m (5 ft 11 in)
- Weight: 66 kg (146 lb)
- Spike: 315 cm (124 in)

Volleyball information
- Position: Middle Blocker
- Current club: Retired

Kumiko Sakino (先野久美子 Sakino Kumiko, born September 9, 1975) is a retired Japanese volleyball player who played for Hisamitsu Springs.

== Clubs ==
- Mitajirijoshi Girls High School (Now SEIEI High School) (1992-1994)
- Daiei/Orange Attackers (1994–2000)
- Hisamitsu Springs (2000-2011)

== National team ==
- Japan 1997, 2000, 2007

== Honours ==
- Team
  - Japan Volleyball League/V.League/V.Premier
    Champions (2): 2002, 2006-07
    Runners-up (1): 2005-06
  - Kurowashiki All Japan Volleyball Championship
    Champions (2): 2006, 2007
  - Empress' Cup
    Runners-up (1): 2007
- Individual
  - 2000 6th V.League: Spike award, Best 6
  - 2002 8th V.League: Most Valuable Player, Best 6
  - 2005 11th V.League: Spike award, Best 6
  - 2007 2006-07 V.Premier League: Most Valuable Player, Best 6
