= HNA Technology =

Chinese holding company

- Formerly: Tianjin Marine Shipping; Tianhai Investment
- Company type: Listed
Traded as
SSE: 600751	(A share)
SSE: 900938	(B share)
- Headquarters: Tianjin, China
- Net income: ▲CN¥322 million (2016)
- Total assets: ▲CN¥117.966 billion (2016)
- Total equity: ▲CN¥12.770 billion (2016)
Owner
HNA Group	(20.76% via investment vehicle HNA Technology Group)
Guohua Life	(14.33% as equity fund manager)
Grand China Logistics Holdings	(9.19%; affiliate of HNA Group)

Chinese name
- Simplified Chinese: 海航科技股份有限公司
- Traditional Chinese: 海航科技股份有限公司
Transcriptions

Chinese short name
- Simplified Chinese: 海航科技
- Traditional Chinese: 海航科技
- Literal meaning: HNA Technology
Transcriptions

Historical Chinese name
- Simplified Chinese: 天津天海投资发展股份有限公司
- Traditional Chinese: 天津天海投資發展股份有限公司
- Literal meaning: Tianjin Tianhai Investment [&] Development Co., Ltd. by Shares
Transcriptions

Historical Chinese short name
- Simplified Chinese: 天海投资
- Traditional Chinese: 天海投資
- Literal meaning: Tianhai Investment
Transcriptions

Second historical Chinese name
- Simplified Chinese: 天津海运
- Traditional Chinese: 天津海運
Transcriptions
- Website: www.hna-tic.com
- Footnotes / references in consolidated financial statement

HNA Technology Co., Ltd. formerly known as Tianjin Tianhai Investment Co., Ltd. is a Chinese holding company which specialized in marine transportation services. However, in recent year it was most known as the investment vehicle of HNA Group to acquire American company Ingram Micro. The shares of Tianhai Investment, A share and B share (Chinese stock terminology) were both listed in the Shanghai Stock Exchange.

== History ==
The company was fined by China Securities Regulatory Commission in 2003 for delay to publish 2002 Annual Report.

In 2015 Tianjin Marine Shipping was renamed to Tianhai Investment.

In 2016, Tianhai Investment acquired Ingram Micro in a leveraged buyout, which the company borrowed a huge sum from the Agricultural Bank of China.

In November 2017, as part of a planned reverse IPO, the listed company was proposed to rename to HNA Technology, namesake of its largest shareholder HNA Technology Group.

According to an interview with a staff from parent company HNA Technology Group in 2019, HNA Technology had 11 ships to be sold, including Capesize cargo ships. It was reported that the company had sold a ship Grand Amanda in 2018.
