= Wu Hsiao-li =

Taiwanese volleyball player (born 1983)

Personal information
- Full name: Wu Hsiao-li (吳曉莉)
- Born: 11 October 1983 (age 43) Taoyuan County (?) (now Taoyuan City), Taiwan
- Height: 1.66 m (5 ft 5 in)
- Weight: 66 kg (146 lb)
- Spike: 288 cm (113 in)
- Block: 279 cm (110 in)

Volleyball information
- Position: Setter
- Current team: National Taiwan Normal University

National team
- Years: Team
- –: Chinese Taipei
- Updated on November 7, 2006

Wu Hsiao-li (Chinese: 吳曉莉; pinyin: Wú Xiǎolì, born 11 October 1983) is retired Taiwanese volleyball player who plays as the main setter in the Chinese Taipei women's national volleyball team.

Wu began to play volleyball at the age of 10. She started as an attacker, and soon her position changed to the setter due to her lack of height.

== Clubs ==
- (Chinese Taipei) Da-Cheng Elementary School, Taoyuan County (now in Taoyuan City)
- (Chinese Taipei) Da Liao Junior High School, Kaohsiung County (now in Kaohsiung City)
- (Chinese Taipei) Chung Shan (2004-2005)
- (Chinese Taipei) National Taiwan Normal University

== Awards ==
=== Individuals ===
- 2004 Asian Club Championship "Best Setter"
- 2005 Asian Club Championship "Best Setter"

=== National team ===
- World University Games
  - Winner: 2005
  - Runner-up: 2003

=== Clubs ===
- 2004 Asian Club Championship - Bronze Medal with Chung Shan
- 2005 Asian Club Championship - Runner-Up, with Chung Shan
