= Lin Chun-yi (volleyball) =

Taiwanese volleyball player (born 1983)

Personal information
- Full name: Lin Chun-yi (林均怡)
- Born: 26 September 1983 (age 43); Taiwan
- Height: 1.83 m (6 ft 0 in)
- Weight: 65 kg (143 lb)
- Spike: 298 cm (117 in)
- Block: 288 cm (113 in)

Volleyball information
- Position: Attacker
- Current team: Taipei PE College

National team
Chinese Taipei
- Last updated: November 16, 2006

Lin Chun-yi (Chinese: 林均怡; pinyin: Lín Jūnyí, born 26 September 1983) is a retired Taiwanese volleyball player who plays as an attacker in Chinese Taipei women's national volleyball team.

== Playing history ==
- Chung Shan Industrial and Commercial School
- Taipei Physical Education College

== Awards ==
=== Individuals ===
- 2005 Asian Club Championship "Best Blocker"

=== National team ===
- World University Games
  - Winner: 2005

=== Clubs ===
- 2005 Asian Club Championship - Runner-Up, with Chung Shan
