= PLDT Home TVolution teams =

PLDT HOME TVolution
- Full name: PLDT HOME TVolution
- Nickname: Power Pinoys (M); Power Pinays (W)
- Founded: 2014
- Head coaches: M: (Philippines) Francis Vicente; W: (Philippines) Sinfronio Acaylay
- Captains: M: (Philippines) Christian Fernandez; W: (Philippines) Rachel Daquis
- League: N/A

The PLDT Home TVolution teams (stylized as PLDT HOME TVolution) represented the Philippines in the 2014 Asian Women's Club Volleyball Championship and the 2014 Asian Men's Club Volleyball Championship. The men's and women's teams are nicknamed the Power Pinoys and Power Pinays, respectively.

== Rosters ==
=== Men ===
Number	Player	Position	Height (ft)
2	(Philippines) Gilbert Longavela	Libero	5'8
3	(Philippines) Raffy Mosuela	Libero	5'9
4	(Philippines) Jonathan Tan	Setter	5'11
5	(Philippines) Jeffrey Malabanan	Opposite/Outside Hitter	6'2
6	(Australia) Cedric Legrand	Outside hitter/Middle Blocker	6'4
8	(Philippines) Richard Gomez	Outside hitter	6'2
9	(Australia) William Robert Lewis	Setter/Middle Blocker	6'4
10	(Philippines) John Paul Torres	Outside hitter	6'4
11	(Philippines) Ranran Abdilla	Outside hitter	6'3
12	(Philippines) Kheeno Franco	Middle blocker	6'2
13	(Philippines) Peter Torres	Middle blocker	6'3
14	(Philippines) Jayson Ramos	Middle blocker	6'3
18	(Philippines) Christian Fernandez (c)	Setter	5'11

=== Women ===
Number	Player	Position	Height (ft)
3	(Japan) Misao Tanyama	Setter	5'10
5	(Philippines) Ging Balse	Middle blocker	5'11
8	(Cuba) Regla Bell	Outside hitter/Opposite	6'1
9	(Philippines) Jovelyn Gonzaga	Opposite	5'9
11	(Philippines) Arriane Argarin	Setter	5'6
12	(Philippines) Tatan Pantone	Libero	5'6
13	(Philippines) Rachel Daquis (c)	Outside hitter	5'10
14	(Philippines) Angeli Tabaquero	Outside hitter	5'8
15	(Philippines) Royse Tubino	Middle blocker/Outside Hitter	5'10
16	(Philippines) Sue Roces	Opposite	5'10
18	(Philippines) Angelique Dionela	Libero	4'11
19	(Philippines) Jaja Santiago	Middle blocker/Outside Hitter	6'6
