= Chizuru Kotō =

Japanese volleyball player (born 1982)

Personal information
- Full name: Chizuru Kotō
- Nickname: As
- Nationality: Japanese
- Born: October 8, 1982 (age 44); Nagayo, Nishisonogi District, Nagasaki Japan
- Height: 1.71 m (5 ft 7 1/2 in)
- Weight: 64 kg (141 lb)
- Spike: 295 cm (116 in)
- Block: 282 cm (111 in)

Volleyball information
- Position: Setter
- Current club: Hisamitsu Springs
- Number: 2

Chizuru Kotō (古藤千鶴, Kotō Chizuru, born Oct 8, 1982) is a Japanese volleyball player who plays for Hisamitsu Springs. She also plays for Japan women's national volleyball team as setter.

== Career ==
Kotō started her career at 7 years old due to her sister. After graduating from Nagasaki Girls' High-school, Kotō joined the PFU BlueCats which participated in the V.Challenge League in 2001.

Kotō served as a captain from 2006–7 season and won the 2008–9 V.Challenge League, where was named the Most Valuable Player. In June 2009, Kotō moved to Hisamitsu Springs.

Kotō served as a captain from 2012–3 season and won V.Premier League, so she was named for the Best6 award.

In April 2014 Kotō took part in the National team.

== Private ==
In August 2011 Kotō married a colleague who works in PFU Ltd.

== Clubs ==
- Nagayo Municipal Nagayo-kita Primary School
- Nagayo Municipal Nagayo Junior highschool
- Nagasaki Girls' Highschool
- (Japan) PFU BlueCats (2001–2009)
- (Japan) Hisamitsu Springs (2009–)

== Awards ==
=== Individuals ===
- 2006-2007 V.Challenge League - Excellent Player award
- 2008-2009 V.Challenge League - Most Valuable Player
- 2012-2013 Premier League - Best 6 award
- 2014 Asian Women's Club Volleyball Championship - Best setter

=== Team ===
- 2006-2007 V.Challenge League - Runner-Up, with PFU BlueCats
- 2008-2009 V.Challenge League - Champion, with PFU BlueCats.
- 2011-2012 V.Premier League - Runner-Up, with Hisamitsu Springs.
- 2012 Empress's Cup - Champion, with Hisamitsu Springs.
- 2012-2013 V.Premier League - Champion, with Hisamitsu Springs.
- 2013 - Japan-Korea V.League Top Match - Champion, with Hisamitsu Springs.
- 2013 - Kurowashiki All Japan Volleyball Tournament - Champion, with Hisamitsu Springs.
- 2013 - Empress's Cup - Champion, with Hisamitsu Springs.
- 2013-2014 V.Premier League - Champion, with Hisamitsu Springs.
- 2014 Asian Club Championship - Champion, with Hisamitsu Springs.
- 2014 - Empress's Cup - Champion, with Hisamitsu Springs.
- 2014-2015 V.Premier League - Runner-Up, with Hisamitsu Springs.

=== National team ===
- 2015 Montreux Volley Masters - Silver medal
