= Yelena Pavlova =

Kazakhstani volleyball player (born 1978)

Yelena Pavlova (born December 12, 1978) is a retired volleyball player from Kazakhstan, born in Tashkent, who captained the Women's National Team at the 2008 Olympic Qualification Tournament in Japan. There the team ended up in fifth place, and qualified for the 2008 Summer Olympics. Pavlova became "Best Scorer" at the event, alongside Puerto Rico's Karina Ocasio. In 2012-2013 she played with VC Zhetysu.

== Clubs ==
- (Kazakhstan) Rahat CSKA (2007)

== Awards ==
=== Individuals ===
- 2007 Asian Club Championship "Most Valuable Player"
- 2007 Asian Club Championship "Best Spiker"
- 2008 Olympic Qualifier "Best Scorer"

=== Clubs ===
- 2007 Asian Club Championship - Champion, with Rahat CSKA
