= Li Yanan =

Li Yanan may refer to:

- Leanne Li, Chinese-born Canadian actress and television host
- Li Yanan (judoka)
