= Shandong women's volleyball team =

Chinese women's volleyball team

Shandong Rizhao Steel Women's Volleyball Club 山东日照鋼鐵女子排球俱樂部
- Short name: Shandong Women's Volleyball 山东女排
- Ground: Zibo Sports Center Complex (Capacity: 6000)
- Manager: Li Yanlong
- League: Chinese Volleyball League
- 2024-25: 6th

Shandong Rizhao Steel Women's Volleyball Club is a professional volleyball team which play in Chinese Volleyball League, which is sponsored by Rizhao Steel. It was sponsored by Laishang Bank.

== CVL results ==
Season	Final ranking
2025-2026	Third place
2024-2025	6th
2023-2024	6th
2022-2023	5th
2021-2022	5th
2020-2021	5th
2019-2020	7th
2018-2019	6th
2017-2018	9th
2016-2017	10th
2015-2016	11th
2014-2015	10th
2013-2014	8th
2012-2013	10th
2011-2012	11th
2010-2011	9th
2009-2010	-
2008-2009	9th
2007-2008	7th
2006-2007	5th
2005-2006	5th
2004-2005	7th
2003-2004	10th
2002-2003	-
2001-2002	12th
2000-2001	12th
1999-2000	12th
1998-1999	-
1997-1998	-
1996-1997	-
