= Kim Hui-gyeong =

South Korean volleyball player (born 1975)

Personal information
- Nationality: South Korean
- Born: 12 January 1975 (age 50)

Sport
- Sport: Volleyball

Kim Hui-gyeong (born 12 January 1975) is a South Korean volleyball player. She competed in the women's tournament at the 2000 Summer Olympics.
