= Park Soo-jeong (volleyball) =

South Korean volleyball player (born 1972)

Park Soo-Jeong

Personal information
- Nationality: South Korean
- Born: 2 March 1972 (age 54)
- Height: 1.78 m (5 ft 10 in)
- Weight: 68 kg (150 lb)

National team
2000	South Korea

Park Soo-jeong (Korean: 박수정; born 2 March 1972) was a South Korean female volleyball player. She was part of the South Korea women's national volleyball team.

She competed with the national team at the 2000 Summer Olympics in Sydney, Australia, finishing 8th.

== Individual awards ==
- 1994 FIVB World Championship - "Best digger"
- 1999 AVC Club Volleyball Championship - "Most valuable player"
- 2000 Summer Olympics - "Best receiver"

== See also ==
- South Korea at the 2000 Summer Olympics
