= Chinese Taipei Volleyball Association =

Taiwanese athletic organization

Chinese Taipei Volleyball Association 中華民國排球協會
- Sport: Volleyball
- Jurisdiction: Taiwan
- Abbreviation: CTVBA
- Founded: 28 December 1954; 70 years ago
- Affiliation: FIVB
- Regional affiliation: AVC
- Headquarters: Zhongshan, Taipei, Taiwan
- President: Kong Chien-Jung
- Secretary: Huang Kuo-Kuang

Official website
- www.ctvba.org.tw
- (Chinese Taipei)
- (Taiwan)

The Chinese Taipei Volleyball Association (CTVBA; Chinese: 中華民國排球協會) is the governing body of volleyball in Republic of China (Taiwan). It represents Taiwan in the Fédération Internationale de Volleyball and the Asian Volleyball Confederation. It also manages men's and women's national volleyball team of Taiwan and organizes Enterprise Volleyball League.

== National teams ==
For details please refer to main articles for dedicated teams.

Men's

- Chinese Taipei men's national volleyball team
- Under-21
- Under-19
- Under-17

Women's

- Chinese Taipei women's national volleyball team
- Under-21
- Under-19
- Under-17

== See also ==
- Enterprise Volleyball League
