= Beijing BAIC Motor women's volleyball team =

Volleyball Team

Beijing Arctic Ocean
- Full name: Beijing Arctic Ocean Women's Volleyball Club 北京北冰洋排球俱樂部
- Short name: Beijing Women’s Volleyball 北京女排
- Founded: 1956
- Ground: Beijing Guangcai Stadium (Capacity: 2800)
- Manager: (China) Zhang Jianzhang
- League: Chinese Volleyball League (CVL)
- 2024-25: 5th

Uniforms
Home	Away

Beijing Arctic Ocean women's volleyball team (Chinese: 北京北冰洋女排) is a professional women's volleyball club based in Beijing, which play in the Chinese Women's Volleyball League (CVL). The team now is sponsored by Arctic Ocean Soda.

The team won the Chinese Women's Volleyball League Group B champions at season 2010–2011 . From the 2011–2012 season, they started to play in the Chinese Women's Volleyball League Group A.

The team won their first Chinese champions title in Season 2018/19.

== CVL results by Season ==
Season	Final Standing
2010-2011	Group B
2011-2012	8th
2012-2013	4th
2013-2014	7th
2014-2015	5th
2015-2016	7th
2016-2017	7th
2017-2018	7th
2018-2019	Champions
2019-2020	3rd
2020-2021	7th
2021-2022	13th
2022-2023	8th
2023-2024	4th
2024-2025	5th
2025-2026	5th

== Team roster ==
Season 2024–2025

2024–2025 Team
Number	Player	Position	Height (m)	Birth date
2	(China) Shen Hongyi	Outside Hitter	1.87	1997/01/08
3	(Bosnia and Herzegovina) Jelena Mladjenović	Opposite	1.96	1997/05/30
5	(China) Tian Yue	Middle Blocker	1.87	1997/07/15
7	(China) Liu Tian	Libero	1.73	2000/09/25
8	(China) Zou Jiaqi	Setter	1.79	2004/12/22
9	(Bosnia and Herzegovina) Edina Begić	Outside Hitter	1.85	1992/10/09
10	(China) Wang Mengjie	Libero	1.73	1995/11/24
12	(China) Cai Yitong	Setter	1.82	2002/04/02
13	(China) Jin Ye (C)	Outside Hitter	1.87	1996/03/31
14	(China) Ma Guangying	Middle Blocker	1.94	2004/04/29
15	(China) Jiang Liwei	Opposite	1.85	2005/07/07
16	(China) Shan Linqian	Middle Blocker	1.94	2005/12/06
18	(Serbia) Jelena Vulin	Opposite	1.82	1996/01/13
19	(China) Zhang Yiwen	Middle Blocker	1.91	2000/06/06

== Former players ==
- (China) Feng Kun (1995-2006)
- (China) Xue Ming (2005-2013)
- (China) Han Xu (2005-2014)
- (Turkey) Seda Tokatlıoğlu (2014-2015)
- (United States) Kelsey Robinson (2014-2015, 2016–2017)
- (Azerbaijan) Jana Matiasovska-Aghayeva (2015-2016)
- (Serbia) Nataša Krsmanović (2015-2016)
- (Serbia) Suzana Čebić (2015-2016)
- (United States) Karsta Lowe (2016-2017)
- (United States) Madison Kingdon (2018-2019)
- (United States) Tetori Dixon (2018-2021)
- (United States) Michelle Bartsch-Hackley (2019-2020)
- (Serbia) Katarina Lazović (2022-2024)
- (Russia) Anna Lazareva (2023-2024)
- (Serbia) Jelena Vulin (2024-2025)
- (Bosnia and Herzegovina) Edina Begić (2024-2025)
- (Bosnia and Herzegovina) Jelena Mladjenović (2024-2025)

== See also ==
- Beijing BAIC Motor Men's Volleyball Team
