= Shanghai women's volleyball team =

Chinese volleyball team

Shanghai Bright Ubest Women’s Volleyball Club
- Full name: Shanghai Bright Ubest Women's Volleyball Club 上海光明优倍女子排球俱乐部
- Short name: 上海女排
- Nickname: Shanghai Bright Ubest
- Founded: 1996
- Ground: Luwan Sports Centre, Shanghai, China (Capacity: 3500)
- Owner: Bright Food (Group) Co., Ltd; Bright Dairy & Food Cop., Ltd
- Manager: (China) Wang Zhiteng (2015–present)
- League: Chinese Volleyball League (CVL)
- 2024-25: 2nd

Uniforms
Home	Away

Shanghai Bright Ubest Women's Volleyball Club (simplified Chinese: 上海光明优倍女排; traditional Chinese: 上海光明優倍女排; pinyin: shànghǎi nǚpái) is a Chinese professional women's volleyball team based in Shanghai that plays in the Chinese Volleyball League (CVL).

The team has won five league titles altogether. Their head coach is Wang Zhiteng. They were sponsored by Guohua Life and Dunlop, and now sponsored by Bright Food (Group) Co., Ltd and Bright Dairy & Food Cop., Ltd.

== CVL results by Season ==
Season	Final ranking
2025-2026	Champions
2024-2025	Runners-up
2023-2024	Runners-up
2022-2023	Runners-up
2021-2022	Third Place
2020-2021	Third Place
2019-2020	Runners-up
2018-2019	Third Place
2017-2018	Runners-up
2016-2017	6th
2015-2016	Third Place
2014-2015	Runners-up
2013-2014	5th
2012-2013	6th
2011-2012	Runners-up
2010-2011	Third Place
2009-2010	Runners-up
2008-2009	Runners-up
2007-2008	Third Place
2006-2007	7th
2005-2006	11th
2004-2005	10th
2003-2004	11th
2002-2003	10th
2001-2002	5th
2000-2001	Champions
1999-2000	Champions
1998-1999	Champions
1997-1998	Champions
1996-1997	Champions

== Team roster ==
Season 2024–2025

2024–2025 Team
Number	Player	Position	Height (m)	Birth date
1	(China) Wang Weiyi	Libero	1.75	1995/06/20
5	(China) Huang Xinyue	Setter	1.77	2002/05/04
6	(China) Gao Yi	Middle Blocker	1.95	1998/07/22
7	(Brazil) Tainara Santos	Opposite	1.87	2000/03/09
8	(China) Xue Yizhi	Middle Blocker	1.92	1997/12/02
9	(China) Gao Huiyi	Outside Hitter	1.88	2003/06/17
10	(Russia) Arina Fedorovtseva	Outside Hitter	1.90	2004/01/19
11	(China) Ouyang Qianqian	Opposite	1.88	1998/01/05
12	(China) Wang Yindi	Opposite	1.85	2005/08/24
14	(China) Zhu Xingchen	Libero	1.65	2003/10/24
16	(China) Chen Houyu	Middle Blocker	1.92	2005/10/08
17	(China) Zhong Hui (C)	Outside Hitter	1.84	1997/12/08
18	(China) Xu Xiaoting	Setter	1.80	1998/01/21

== Champions Titles ==
=== Chinese Volleyball League ===
Season	Champions	Runners-up
2000-2001	Shanghai	Bayi
1999-2000	Shanghai	Jiangsu
1998-1999	Shanghai	Zhejiang
1997-1998	Shanghai	Jiangsu
1996-1997	Shanghai	Jiangsu

=== AVC Club Championship ===
Year	Host	Champions	Second Place	Third Place	Fourth Place
2000; Details	(China); Shaoxing	(China) Shanghai Cable TV	(Japan) NEC Red Rockets	(China) Zhejiang Nandu	(South Korea) Hyundai Greenfox
2001; Details	(Vietnam); Ho Chi Minh City	(China) Shanghai Cable TV	(Japan) Hisamitsu Springs	(Thailand) Aero Thai	(Kazakhstan) Rahat CSKA

== Honours ==
=== International competitions ===
==== AVC Champions League ====
Champions (2): 2000, 2001
Third Place (1): 1999

=== Domestic competitions ===
==== Chinese Volleyball League / Chinese Volleyball Super League ====
Champions (6):1996-97,1997-98,1998-99, 1999-2000, 2000-01, 2025-26
Runners-up (9): 2008-09, 2009-2010, 2011-12, 2014-15, 2017-18, 2019-2020, 2022-23, 2023-24, 2024-25
Third Place (6):2007-08, 2010-11, 2015-16，2018-19, 2020-21, 2021-22

== Former players ==
- (China) Zhang Jing (1996-2008)
- (China) Wang Yi (1996-1999)
- (China) Li Yizhi (1996-2002)
- (China) Zhu Yunying (1996–2002)
- (China) He Qing (2001-2009)
- (United States) Heather Bown (2013-2014)
- (United States) Nellie Spicer (2013-2014)
- (Poland) Kinga Kasprzak (2013-2014)
- (Germany) Margareta Kozuch (2014-2015)
- (Croatia) Senna Ušić-Jogunica (2014-2016)
- (Canada) Sarah Pavan (2015-2017)
- (Czech Republic) Helena Havelkova (2016-2017)
- (South Korea) Kim Yeon-koung (2017-2018, 2021-22)
- (United States) Kelly Murphy (2018-2019)
- (United States) Jordan Larson (2019-2022)
- (Germany) Louisa Lippmann (2019-2021)
- (Mexico) Samantha Bricio (2022-2024)
- (Russia) Arina Fedorovtseva (2024-2025)
- (Brazil) Tainara Santos (2024-2025)

== Head coaches ==
Note: The following list may not be complete.

- (China) Zhang Liming (????–1996)
- (China) Zhang Jichen (1996–1997)
- (China) Cai Bin (1997–2002)
- (China) Yu Youwei (2002–2003)
- (China) Zhang Liming (2003–2013)
- (China) Wang Jian (2013–2014)
- (China) He Jiong (2014–2015)
- (China) Wang Zhiteng (2015–)

== See also ==
- Shanghai Men's Volleyball Club
