= 2021–22 Chinese Women's Volleyball Super League =

2021-2022 Chinese Women's Volleyball Super League
- League: Chinese Women's Volleyball Super League
- Sport: Volleyball
- Duration: Nov 25, 2021 – Jan 6, 2022
- Teams: 14

Regular season
- Season champions: Tianjin Bohai Bank
- Runners-up: Jiangsu Zenith Steel
- Season MVP: (China) Li Yingying (TIA)

Finals
- Champions: Tianjin Bohai Bank
- Runners-up: Jiangsu Zenith Steel

Chinese Women's Volleyball Super League seasons
- ← 2020–21 2022-23 →

The 2021–22 Chinese Women's Volleyball Super League is the 25th season of the Chinese Women's Volleyball Super League, the highest professional volleyball league in China. The season began on 25 November 2021 and end the Finals on 6 January 2022. Tianjin Bohai Bank were the defending champion. The league is divided into three stages. The first stage, 14 teams separated into two groups, matches began on 25 November and ended on 4 December. The second stage, began on 15 December and ended on 28 December. The final stage, began on 30 December and ended on 6 January .

Shenzhen Phoenix is the new team in this season, which was established by Chinese Volleyball Association and Volleyball Federation of Serbia in 2021.

Similar to Season 2020/21, this season also held at one designed venue, no spectators is allowed. Meanwhile, All Star Games made its return this season after last year's absence.

== Teams ==
The map of the teams participating in the 2021–22 Chinese Volleyball League

Team	Head coach	Captain	2020–21 season result
Beijing Baic Motor	(China) Chu Hui	(China) Wang Yunlu	7th
Tianjin Bohai Bank	(China) Wang Baoquan	(China) Yao Di	1st
Shanghai Bright Ubest	(China) Wang Zhiteng	(China) Yang Jie	3rd
Jiangsu Zenith Steel	(China) Cai Bin	(China) Gong Xiangyu	2nd
Liaoning Huajun	(China) Zhao Yong	(China) Ding Xia	6th
Shandong Yizhao Steel	(China) Li Yanlong	(China) Song Meili	5th
Guangdong Jiangmen CNS Group	(China) Feng Li	(China) Li Yao	4th
Fujian Anxi Tiekuanyin	(China) Hu Jin	(China) Zheng Yixin	10th
Shenzhen Phoenix	(China) Bao Zhuang	(China) Zhang Yichan	new team
Henan	(China) Jiao Shuai	(China) Zhang Zihan	11th
Zhejiang Jiaxing Xitang Ancient Town	(China) Wang Hebing	(China) Zhu Yuezhou	8th
Dianchi College of Yunnan University	(China) Yang Jingmiao	(China) Liu Mengya	9th
Sichuan	(China) Ye Wen	(China) Wang Chen	12th
Hebei Hairui	(China) Li Lijun	(China) Luo Xiao	13th

=== Foreign players ===
The number of foreign players is restricted for each club. In this season, each team is only allowed one foreign player in a match, no more than one is allowed at the same time.

2021–22 Chinese Women's Volleyball Super League foreign players
Team	Foreign player
Tianjin Bohai Bank	(Cuba) Melissa Vargas
Shanghai Bright Ubest	(United States) Jordan Larson, (South Korea) Kim Yeon-koung
Shenzhen Phoenix	(Bosnia and Herzegovina) Dajana Bošković

== Regular season ==
=== Group A ===
Pos	Team	Pld	W	L	Pts	SW	SL	SR	SPW	SPL	SPR
1	Tianjin Bohai Bank	6	6	0	18	18	1	18.000	470	291	1.615
2	Guangdong Jiangmen CNS Group	6	5	1	14	15	8	1.875	528	468	1.128
3	Shandong Yizhao Steel	6	4	2	12	14	7	2.000	477	408	1.169
4	Zhejiang Jiaxing Xitang Ancient Town	6	3	3	10	11	9	1.222	441	425	1.038
5	Dianchi College of Yunnan University	6	2	4	6	7	13	0.538	376	458	0.821
6	Sichuan	6	1	5	3	4	15	0.267	370	469	0.789
7	Hebei Hairui	6	0	6	0	2	18	0.111	351	494	0.711

Source: Ranking Table Group A

==== Round 1 ====
Date	Time		Score		Set 1	Set 2	Set 3	Set 4	Set 5	Total	Report
25 Nov	12:00	Zhejiang Jiaxing Xitang Ancient Town	3–0	Hebei Hairui	25–12	25–22	25–14	–	–	75–48	Report
25 Nov	14:00	Dianchi College of Yunnan University	3–0	Sichuan	25–20	25–13	25–16	–	–	75–49	Report
25 Nov	20:00	Shandong Yizhao Steel	1–3	Tianjin Bohai Bank	25–20	14–25	23–25	8–25	–	70–95	Report

==== Round 2 ====
Date	Time		Score		Set 1	Set 2	Set 3	Set 4	Set 5	Total	Report
26 Nov	14:00	Hebei Hairui	1–3	Dianchi College of Yunnan University	24–26	25–16	17–25	20–25	–	86–92	Report
26 Nov	16:00	Guangdong Jiangmen CNS Group	3–1	Shandong Yizhao Steel	23–25	25–23	25–15	25–21	–	98–84	Report
26 Nov	18:00	Tianjin Bohai Bank	3–0	Zhejiang Jiaxing Xitang Ancient Town	25–8	25–21	25–19	–	–	75–48	Report

==== Round 3 ====
Date	Time		Score		Set 1	Set 2	Set 3	Set 4	Set 5	Total	Report
28 Nov	10:00	Zhejiang Jiaxing Xitang Ancient Town	2–3	Guangdong Jiangmen CNS Group	16–25	25–23	20–25	25–20	14–16	100–109	Report
28 Nov	12:00	Dianchi College of Yunnan University	0–3	Tianjin Bohai Bank	16–25	6–25	10–25	–	–	32–75	Report
28 Nov	14:00	Sichuan	3–0	Hebei Hairui	25–20	28–26	25–20	–	–	78–66	Report

==== Round 4 ====
Date	Time		Score		Set 1	Set 2	Set 3	Set 4	Set 5	Total	Report
29 Nov	14:00	Tianjin Bohai Bank	3–0	Sichuan	25–16	25–9	25–19	–	–	75–44	Report
29 Nov	16:00	Guangdong Jiangmen CNS Group	3–0	Dianchi College of Yunnan University	25–19	25–12	25–20	–	–	75–51	Report
29 Nov	18:00	Shandong Yizhao Steel	3–0	Zhejiang Jiaxing Xitang Ancient Town	25–20	26–24	25–22	–	–	76–66	Report

==== Round 5 ====
Date	Time		Score		Set 1	Set 2	Set 3	Set 4	Set 5	Total	Report
1 Dic	10:00	Dianchi College of Yunnan University	1–3	Shandong Yizhao Steel	15–25	19–25	25–22	11–25	–	70–97	Report
1 Dic	12:00	Sichuan	1–3	Guangdong Jiangmen CNS Group	27–25	23–25	24–26	20–25	–	94–101	Report
1 Dic	14:00	Hebei Hairui	0–3	Tianjin Bohai Bank	14–25	19–25	18–25	–	–	51–75	Report

==== Round 6 ====
Date	Time		Score		Set 1	Set 2	Set 3	Set 4	Set 5	Total	Report
2 Dic	14:00	Guangdong Jiangmen CNS Group	3–1	Hebei Hairui	25–14	25–15	24–26	25–9	–	99–64	Report
2 Dic	16:00	Shandong Yizhao Steel	3–0	Sichuan	25–15	25–16	25–13	–	–	75–44	Report
2 Dic	18:00	Zhejiang Jiaxing Xitang Ancient Town	3–0	Dianchi College of Yunnan University	25–20	25–21	25–15	–	–	75–56	Report

==== Round 7 ====
Date	Time		Score		Set 1	Set 2	Set 3	Set 4	Set 5	Total	Report
4 Dic	10:00	Tianjin Bohai Bank	3–0	Guangdong Jiangmen CNS Group	25–17	25–9	25–20	–	–	75–46	Report
4 Dic	12:00	Hebei Hairui	0–3	Shandong Yizhao Steel	11–25	10–25	14–25	–	–	35–75	Report
4 Dic	14:00	Sichuan	0–3	Zhejiang Jiaxing Xitang Ancient Town	25–27	18–25	18–25	–	–	61–77	Report

=== Group B ===
Pos	Team	Pld	W	L	Pts	SW	SL	SR	SPW	SPL	SPR
1	Shanghai Bright Ubest	6	5	1	15	15	4	3.750	455	364	1.250
2	Jiangsu Zenith Steel	6	5	1	15	15	5	3.000	471	373	1.263
3	Liaoning Huajun	6	5	1	14	15	7	2.143	526	456	1.154
4	Shenzhen Phoenix	6	3	3	9	11	12	0.917	478	514	0.930
5	Fujian Anxi Tiekuanyin	6	2	4	6	10	12	0.833	511	523	0.977
6	Henan	6	1	5	4	6	15	0.400	411	507	0.811
7	Beijing Baic Motor	6	0	6	0	1	18	0.056	360	475	0.758

Source: Ranking Table Group B

==== Round 1 ====
Date	Time		Score		Set 1	Set 2	Set 3	Set 4	Set 5	Total	Report
25 Nov	10:00	Fujian Anxi Tiekuanyin	3–0	Henan	25–14	33–31	25–18	–	–	83–63	Report
25 Nov	16:00	Beijing Baic Motor	1–3	Shenzhen Phoenix	22–25	14–25	25–23	20–25	–	81–98	Report
25 Nov	18:00	Liaoning Huajun	3–0	Jiangsu Zenith Steel	25–19	25–20	25–15	–	–	75–54	Report

==== Round 2 ====
Date	Time		Score		Set 1	Set 2	Set 3	Set 4	Set 5	Total	Report
27 Nov	14:00	Shenzhen Phoenix	3–1	Fujian Anxi Tiekuanyin	27–25	19–25	27–25	25–21	–	98–96	Report
27 Nov	16:00	Jiangsu Zenith Steel	3–0	Beijing Baic Motor	25–11	25–17	25–15	–	–	75–43	Report
27 Nov	18:00	Shanghai Bright Ubest	3–0	Liaoning Huajun	25–23	25–17	25–17	–	–	75–57	Report

==== Round 3 ====
Date	Time		Score		Set 1	Set 2	Set 3	Set 4	Set 5	Total	Report
28 Nov	16:00	Henan	1–3	Shenzhen Phoenix	22–25	25–18	9–25	14–25	–	70–93	Report
28 Nov	18:00	Fujian Anxi Tiekuanyin	1–3	Jiangsu Zenith Steel	15–25	25–22	20–25	24–26	–	84–98	Report
28 Nov	20:00	Beijing Baic Motor	0–3	Shanghai Bright Ubest	17–25	23–25	19–25	–	–	59–75	Report

==== Round 4 ====
Date	Time		Score		Set 1	Set 2	Set 3	Set 4	Set 5	Total	Report
30 Nov	14:00	Jiangsu Zenith Steel	3–0	Henan	25–19	25–18	25–10	–	–	75–47	Report
30 Nov	16:00	Liaoning Huajun	3–0	Beijing Baic Motor	25–12	25–21	25–18	–	–	75–51	Report
30 Nov	18:00	Shanghai Bright Ubest	3–1	Fujian Anxi Tiekuanyin	25–15	23–25	25–20	25–19	–	98–79	Report

==== Round 5 ====
Date	Time		Score		Set 1	Set 2	Set 3	Set 4	Set 5	Total	Report
1 Dic	16:00	Fujian Anxi Tiekuanyin	1–3	Liaoning Huajun	20–25	28–30	31–29	15–25	–	94–109	Report
1 Dic	18:00	Henan	0–3	Shanghai Bright Ubest	20–25	20–25	12–25	–	–	52–75	Report
1 Dic	20:00	Shenzhen Phoenix	1–3	Jiangsu Zenith Steel	25–19	17–25	13–25	12–25	–	67–94	Report

==== Round 6 ====
Date	Time		Score		Set 1	Set 2	Set 3	Set 4	Set 5	Total	Report
3 Dic	14:00	Beijing Baic Motor	0–3	Fujian Anxi Tiekuanyin	19–25	18–25	20–25	–	–	57–75	Report
3 Dic	16:00	Liaoning Huajun	3–2	Henan	25–18	24–26	25–23	23–25	15–10	112–102	Report
3 Dic	18:00	Shanghai Bright Ubest	3–0	Shenzhen Phoenix	25–15	25–16	25–11	–	–	75–42	Report

==== Round 7 ====
Date	Time		Score		Set 1	Set 2	Set 3	Set 4	Set 5	Total	Report
4 Dic	16:00	Henan	3–0	Beijing Baic Motor	27–25	25–23	25–21	–	–	77–69	Report
4 Dic	18:00	Shenzhen Phoenix	1–3	Liaoning Huajun	25–23	16–25	16–25	23–25	–	80–98	Report
4 Dic	20:00	Jiangsu Zenith Steel	3–0	Shanghai Bright Ubest	25–23	25–16	25–18	–	–	75–57	Report

== Final standing ==
Rank	Team
1st place, gold medalist(s)	
2nd place, silver medalist(s)	
3rd place, bronze medalist(s)	
4	
5	
6	
7	
8	
9	
10	
11	
12	
13	
14	
