= 2019–20 Chinese Men's Volleyball Super League =

- League: Chinese Men's Volleyball Super League
- Sport: Volleyball
- Duration: 19 January 2020 – 1 September 2020
- Teams: 13

Finals
- Champions: Shanghai Golden Age
- Runners-up: Jiangsu Nanjing Radio and Television

Chinese Men's Volleyball Super League seasons
- 2018–19 2020–21

The 2019–20 Chinese Men's Volleyball Super League (Chinese: 2019-20年中国男子排球超級联赛) is the 24th season of the Chinese Men's Volleyball Super League, the highest professional volleyball league in China. Shanghai Golden Age are the defending champions.

The regular season was scheduled to begin on 19 January 2020 and ended with the Finals on 12 May 2020, but was postponed following the coronavirus pandemic. On 17 August 2020, Chinese Volleyball Association announce that the season would be resumed on 20 August 2020 in Qinhuangdao, a coastal city in eastern China, finishing on 2 September. The 14-day schedule is the shortest for this event in its history as the games are played in tournament style.

On 1 September 2020, Shanghai Golden Age won their 16th Chinese Men's Volleyball Super League title, after defeating Jiangsu Nanjing Radio and Television Maomao in the final, 2–0 (3–1, 3–0).

== Clubs ==
=== Clubs and locations ===
Team	Stadium	Capacity	City	2018–19 season
Shanghai Golden Age	Shanghai Luwan Gymnasium	3,500	Shanghai	1st
Beijing Baic Motor	Guangcai Stadium	2,800	Beijing	2nd
Jiangsu Nanjing Radio and Television Maomao	Fangzhaozhou Gymnasium	3,954	Nanjing	3rd
Shandong Sports Lottery	Zhangdian Gymnasium	2,000	Zibo	4th
Sichuan Jinlang Sports	Shuangliu Sports Centre	3,400	Chengdu	6th
Zhejiang Sports Lottery	Pinghu Sports Center Gymnasium		Jiaxing	7th
Henan	Nanyang Sports Center Gymnasium	5,880	Nanyang	8th
Tianjin Food Group	Tianjin People's Stadium	3,400	Tianjin	9th
Shenzhen Bao'an Mingjinhai	Shenzhen Bao'an Stadium		Shenzhen	10th
Hebei Hairui	Shijiazhuang University Gymnastic Hall		Shijiazhuang	11th
Liaoning	Dandong Sport Center Stadium	6,000	Dandong	12th
Fujian Normal University	Fujian Normal University Sports Center Stadium	3,000	Fuzhou	13th
Hubei	Xiaogan Sports Centre Stadium		Xiaogan	14th

=== Clubs Locations ===
The map of the teams participating in the 2019–20 Chinese Men's Volleyball Super League

== Regular season ==
=== First stage ===
==== Group A ====
Pos	Team	Pld	W	L	Pts	SW	SL	SR	SPW	SPL	SPR
1	Shanghai Golden Age	2	2	0	6	6	1	6.000	174	125	1.392
2	Henan	2	1	1	3	4	3	1.333	153	159	0.962
3	Tianjin Food Group	2	0	2	0	0	6	0.000	107	150	0.713

Date	Time		Score		Set 1	Set 2	Set 3	Set 4	Set 5	Total	Report
19 Jan	16:00	Henan	3–0	Tianjin Food Group	25–21	25–19	25–20			75–60	
20 Aug	13:00	Henan	1–3	Shanghai Golden Age	25–22	10–25	25–27	18–25		78–99	
21 Aug	17:00	Tianjin Food Group	0–3	Shanghai Golden Age	19–25	14–25	14–25			47–75	

==== Group B ====
Pos	Team	Pld	W	L	Pts	SW	SL	SR	SPW	SPL	SPR
1	Zhejiang Sports Lottery	2	2	0	6	6	2	3.000	194	174	1.115
2	Beijing Baic Motor	2	1	1	3	4	3	1.333	161	159	1.013
3	Shenzhen Bao'an Mingjinhai	1	0	1	0	1	6	0.167	148	170	0.871

Date	Time		Score		Set 1	Set 2	Set 3	Set 4	Set 5	Total	Report
19 Jan	19:00	Zhejiang Sports Lottery	3–1	Shenzhen Bao'an Mingjinhai	25–21	25–22	20–25	25–20		95–88	
20 Aug	15:00	Beijing Baic Motor	1–3	Zhejiang Sports Lottery	26–24	23–25	19–25	18–25		86–99	
21 Aug	19:30	Beijing Baic Motor	3–0	Shenzhen Bao'an Mingjinhai	25–23	25–19	25–18			75–60	

==== Group C ====
Pos	Team	Pld	W	L	Pts	SW	SL	SR	SPW	SPL	SPR
1	Jiangsu Nanjing Radio and Television	3	3	0	9	9	1	9.000	244	201	1.214
2	Sichuan Jinlang Sports	3	2	1	6	7	3	2.333	233	193	1.207
3	Hubei	3	1	2	3	6	3	2.000	179	203	0.882
4	Liaoning	3	0	3	0	0	9	0.000	166	225	0.738

Date	Time		Score		Set 1	Set 2	Set 3	Set 4	Set 5	Total	Report
19 Jan	16:00	Jiangsu Nanjing Radio and Television	3–0	Hubei	25–19	25–18	25–19			75–56	
19 Jan	16:00	Sichuan Jinlang Sports	3–0	Liaoning	25–20	25–17	25–14			75–51	
20 Aug	17:00	Hubei	3–0	Liaoning	25–16	25–16	25–21			75–53	
20 Aug	19:30	Jiangsu Nanjing Radio and Television	3–1	Sichuan Jinlang Sports	25–21	19–25	25–22	25–21		94–89	
22 Aug	15:00	Sichuan Jinlang Sports	3–0	Hubei	25–20	25–13	25–15			75–48	
22 Aug	17:00	Liaoning	0–3	Jiangsu Nanjing Radio and Television	19–25	22–25	21–25			62–75	

==== Group D ====
Pos	Team	Pld	W	L	Pts	SW	SL	SR	SPW	SPL	SPR
1	Shandong Sports Lottery	2	2	0	6	6	0	MAX	150	115	1.304
2	Fujian Normal University	1	1	0	3	3	3	1.000	133	131	1.015
3	Hebei Hairui	2	0	2	0	0	6	0.000	113	150	0.753

Date	Time		Score		Set 1	Set 2	Set 3	Set 4	Set 5	Total	Report
19 Jan	16:00	Shandong Sports Lottery	3–0	Hebei Hairui	25–18	25–18	25–21			75–57	
21 Aug	15:00	Hebei Hairui	0–3	Fujian Normal University	22–25	16–25	18–25			56–75	
22 Aug	19:30	Fujian Normal University	0–3	Shandong Sports Lottery	23–25	16–25	19–25			58–75	

=== Second stage ===
==== Group E ====
Pos	Team	Pld	W	L	Pts	SW	SL	SR	SPW	SPL	SPR
1	Jiangsu Nanjing Radio and Television	5	3	2	9	12	9	1.333	479	464	1.032
2	Shanghai Golden Age	5	3	2	9	9	9	1.000	414	399	1.038
3	Sichuan Jinlang Sports	5	3	2	8	11	9	1.222	446	428	1.042
4	Henan	5	1	4	4	9	14	0.643	478	526	0.909

Date	Time		Score		Set 1	Set 2	Set 3	Set 4	Set 5	Total	Report
23 Aug	13:00	Shanghai Golden Age	3–1	Sichuan Jinlang Sports	20–25	25–18	25–19	25–16		95–78	
23 Aug	15:00	Henan	3–2	Jiangsu Nanjing Radio and Television	23–25	25–18	28–26	14–25	16–14	106–108	
24 Aug	17:00	Henan	2–3	Sichuan Jinlang Sports	33–35	15–25	25–18	25–21	11–15	109–114	
24 Aug	19:30	Shanghai Golden Age	3–1	Jiangsu Nanjing Radio and Television	23–25	25–20	25–22	25–23		98–90	
26 Aug	13:00	Sichuan Jinlang Sports	3–0	Shanghai Golden Age	25–21	25–14	25–20			75–55	
26 Aug	15:00	Jiangsu Nanjing Radio and Television	3–2	Henan	22–25	21–25	26–24	25–23	15–13	109–110	
27 Aug	17:00	Jiangsu Nanjing Radio and Television	3–0	Shanghai Golden Age	25–18	25–23	28–26			78–67	
27 Aug	19:30	Sichuan Jinlang Sports	3–1	Henan	21–25	25–15	25–16	25–19		96–75	

==== Group F ====
Pos	Team	Pld	W	L	Pts	SW	SL	SR	SPW	SPL	SPR
1	Shandong Sports Lottery	5	4	1	11	13	5	2.600	422	383	1.102
2	Zhejiang Sports Lottery	5	3	2	10	11	8	1.375	442	408	1.083
3	Beijing Baic Motor	5	3	2	9	10	7	1.429	402	371	1.084
4	Fujian Normal University	4	0	4	0	1	15	0.067	305	409	0.746

Date	Time		Score		Set 1	Set 2	Set 3	Set 4	Set 5	Total	Report
23 Aug	17:00	Zhejiang Sports Lottery	3–1	Fujian Normal University	25–17	25–12	34–36	25–21		109–86	
23 Aug	19:30	Beijing Baic Motor	0–3	Shandong Sports Lottery	25–27	20–25	25–27			70–79	
25 Aug	17:00	Beijing Baic Motor	3–0	Fujian Normal University	25–22	25–17	25–17			75–56	
25 Aug	19:30	Zhejiang Sports Lottery	2–3	Shandong Sports Lottery	25–20	21–25	25–21	25–27	10–15	106–108	
26 Aug	17:00	Fujian Normal University	0–3	Zhejiang Sports Lottery	17–25	20–25	16–25			53–75	
26 Aug	19:30	Shandong Sports Lottery	1–3	Beijing Baic Motor	25–21	19–25	22–25	19–25		85–96	
28 Aug	17:00	Shandong Sports Lottery	3–0	Zhejiang Sports Lottery	25–14	25–18	25–21			75–53	
28 Aug	19:30	Fujian Normal University	0–3	Beijing Baic Motor	21–25	14–25	17–25			52–75	

==== Group G ====
Pos	Team	Pld	W	L	Pts	SW	SL	SR	SPW	SPL	SPR
1	Tianjin Food Group	4	3	1	9	10	4	2.500	332	305	1.089
2	Hubei	3	2	1	6	6	4	1.500	236	217	1.088
3	Liaoning	3	0	3	0	1	9	0.111	197	243	0.811

Date	Time		Score		Set 1	Set 2	Set 3	Set 4	Set 5	Total	Report
24 Aug	15:00	Tianjin Food Group	3–0	Liaoning	25–23	25–21	25–15			75–59	
25 Aug	13:00	Tianjin Food Group	3–0	Hubei	25–23	25–21	25–19			75–63	
27 Aug	15:00	Liaoning	1–3	Tianjin Food Group	20–25	22–25	25–18	18–25		85–93	
28 Aug	13:00	Hubei	3–1	Tianjin Food Group	23–25	25–20	25–21	25–23		98–89	

==== Group H ====
Pos	Team	Pld	W	L	Pts	SW	SL	SR	SPW	SPL	SPR
1	Hebei Hairui	1	1	0	3	4	3	1.333	154	164	0.939
2	Shenzhen Bao'an Mingjinhai	2	1	1	3	3	4	0.750	164	154	1.065

Date	Time		Score		Set 1	Set 2	Set 3	Set 4	Set 5	Total	Report
25 Aug	15:00	Hebei Hairui	3–0	Shenzhen Bao'an Mingjinhai	25–21	25–21	25–22			75–64	
28 Aug	15:00	Shenzhen Bao'an Mingjinhai	3–1	Hebei Hairui	25–27	25–22	25–15	25–15		100–79	

== Final stage ==
=== Bracket ===
Semifinals
Jiangsu	3
Zhejiang Sports Lottery	1
Shanghai Golden Age	3
Shandong Sports Lottery	1

Final
Jiangsu	1	0
Shanghai Golden Age	3	3

Third place match
Zhejiang Sports Lottery	1
Shandong Sports Lottery	3

Fifth place play-offs
Sichuan Jinlang Sports	3
Fujian Normal University	2
Henan	0
Beijing Baic Motor	3

Fifth place match
Sichuan Jinlang Sports	0
Beijing Baic Motor	3
Seventh place match
Fujian Normal University	3
Henan	0

=== Third stage ===
==== Fifth place play-offs ====
Date	Time		Score		Set 1	Set 2	Set 3	Set 4	Set 5	Total	Report
29 Aug	13:00	Sichuan Jinlang Sports	3–2	Fujian Normal University	25–17	14–25	23–25	25–17	15–7	102–91	
29 Aug	15:00	Henan	0–3	Beijing Baic Motor	18–25	15–25	20–25			53–75	

==== Semifinals ====
Date	Time		Score		Set 1	Set 2	Set 3	Set 4	Set 5	Total	Report
29 Aug	17:00	Jiangsu Nanjing Radio and Television	3–1	Zhejiang Sports Lottery	14–25	25–20	28–26	25–21		92–92	
29 Aug	19:30	Shanghai Golden Age	3–1	Shandong Sports Lottery	22–25	25–16	25–21	25–19		97–81	

=== Fourth stage ===
==== Eleventh place match ====
Date	Time		Score		Set 1	Set 2	Set 3	Set 4	Set 5	Total	Report
30 Aug	17:00	Hebei Hairui	1–3	Hubei	34–32	16–25	20–25	28–30		98–112	

==== Ninth place match ====
Date	Time		Score		Set 1	Set 2	Set 3	Set 4	Set 5	Total	Report
30 Aug	19:30	Tianjin Food Group	2–3	Shenzhen Bao'an Mingjinhai	25–22	25–23	19–25	22–25	13–15	104–110	

==== Seventh place match ====
Date	Time		Score		Set 1	Set 2	Set 3	Set 4	Set 5	Total	Report
31 Aug	13:00	Fujian Normal University	3–0	Henan	25–20	25–16	25–13			75–49	

==== Fifth place match ====
Date	Time		Score		Set 1	Set 2	Set 3	Set 4	Set 5	Total	Report
31 Aug	15:00	Sichuan Jinlang Sports	0–3	Beijing Baic Motor	17–25	23–25	27–29			67–79	

==== Third place match ====
Date	Time		Score		Set 1	Set 2	Set 3	Set 4	Set 5	Total	Report
31 Aug	17:00	Zhejiang Sports Lottery	1–3	Shandong Sports Lottery	23–25	23–25	25–22	23–25		94–97	

==== Final ====
Date	Time		Score		Set 1	Set 2	Set 3	Set 4	Set 5	Total	Report
31 Aug	19:30	Jiangsu Nanjing Radio and Television	1–3	Shanghai Golden Age	12–25	25–20	15–25	22–25		74–95	
1 Sep	19:30	Shanghai Golden Age	3–0	Jiangsu Nanjing Radio and Television	25–22	25–19	25–17			75–58	

== Final standing ==
Rank	Team
1st place, gold medalist(s)	Shanghai Golden Age
2nd place, silver medalist(s)	Jiangsu Nanjing Radio and Television
3rd place, bronze medalist(s)	Shandong Sports Lottery
4	Zhejiang Sports Lottery
5	Beijing Baic Motor
6	Sichuan Jinlang Sports
7	Fujian Normal University
8	Henan
9	Shenzhen Bao'an Mingjinhai
10	Tianjin Food Group
11	Hubei
12	Hebei Hairui
13	Liaoning
