= Chinese Volleyball Super League =

Chinese professional volleyball league

Chinese Volleyball League (CVL)
- Upcoming season or competition: 2026–27 Chinese Women's Volleyball Super League
- Sport: Volleyball
- Founded: 1996; 30 years ago
- No. of teams: M: 14; W: 14
- Country: China
- Continent: AVC (Asia)
- Most recent champions: M: Tianjin Food Group (2025–2026); W: Shanghai Bright Ubest (2025–2026)
- Most titles: M: Shanghai Bright (18 titles); W: Tianjin Bohai Bank (16 titles)
- Broadcasters: CCTV-5, Provincial satellite channels
- Website: www.volleyballchina.com

Chinese Volleyball Super League, often abbreviated to CVL, are the pre-eminent men's and women's professional volleyball leagues in China. It was founded in 1996 as the Chinese Volleyball League and is organized by the Chinese Volleyball Association (CVA). The league was rebranded to the Chinese Volleyball Super League when it became fully professional in 2017. The champions qualify for the Asian Men's and Asian Volleyball Women's Champions League.

The women's league normally starts in November and ends in March of the following year, while the men's league starts in October and ends in February of the following year, lasting for about four months. The league is divided into four stages: the first two stages normally called as "Regular Season", and the last two stages called as "Playoffs".

The number of teams has increased from 12 to 14 since Season 2017/18, for both men's and women's leagues. Due to COVID-19, Seasons 2020/21 & 2021/22 shorten the competition to about 2 months, and held at a designated venue.

Start from Season 2024/25, the league is divided into Division A and Division B, Division A are the top eight ranked teams of last season. At the end of the season, the winner of Division B against with the last ranked team of Division A to qualify for the Division A of next season.

== Format ==
The both men and women's leagues use the same format.

- First stage (Regular)

The first stage is a double round-robin match of home and away games. According to the rankings of last season, divided into two divisions, A and B. The top six teams of Division A qualify to Playoffs, while the last two ranked teams join the Qualification Playoffs to play against with the top two teams of Division B, the winners qualify to Playoffs.

- Second stage (Playoffs)

The teams of Division A divided into two groups and play double round-robin match of home and away games. The top two teams of each group qualify to Semi-Finals, while the last two ranked teams of each group qualify to placement matches.

- Third stage (Semi-Finals)

According to the group result of last stage, The A1 plays against B2, and the B1 plays against A2. Use three games and two wins.

- Fourth stage (Finals)

A best-of-five-game system is adopted. The top teams in the first stage, first away game, then two home games, then one away game and one home game.

== Men's Super League ==
=== Current clubs (14 teams) ===
The map of the teams participating in the Chinese Volleyball League

=== Teams in Men's League (2025–26) ===
Team	Arena	Capacity	City/Area
Division A
Beijing BAIC	Beijing Guangcai Stadium	2,800	Beijing
Guangdong Taishan	Taishan Gymnasium	3,000	Taishan
Hubei Baoding	Xingrui Gymnasium	3,200	Baoding
Liaoning	Weinan Sports Training Base	4,000	Shenyang
Shandong Qingdao Xinglun Youyou	Qingdao University Gymnasium	6,000	Qingdao
Shanghai Bright	Luwan Sports Centre	3,500	Shanghai
Tianjin Food Group	Tianjin People's Arena	3,400	Tianjin
Zhejiang Deqing	Deqing Sports Center Gymnasium	3,000	Deqing
Division B
Fujian	Fujian Normal University General Gymnasium	3,000	Fuqing
Henan	Nanyang Sports Center Gymnasium	5,880	Nanyang
Hebei Dongchu	Xingtai City Stadium	4,500	Xingtai
Hubei	Hubei Institute of Engineering Gymnasium		Xiaogan
Jiangsu	Nanjing University Gymnasium	3,954	Nanjing
Sichuan	Shuangliu Sports Center	3,400	Chengdu

=== Winners of Previous Seasons ===
Season	Champions	Runners-up	3rd place
2025–2026	Tianjin Food Group	Hubei Baoding	Shanghai Bright
2024–2025	Shanghai Bright	Hubei Baoding	Tianjin Food Group
2023–2024	Shanghai Bright	Beijing BAIC Motor	Zhejiang
2022–2023	Beijing BAIC Motor	Shanghai Bright	Zhejiang
2021–2022	Cancelled due to COVID-19 pandemic		
2020–2021	Beijing BAIC Motor	Shanghai Bright	Jiangsu
2019–2020	Shanghai Golden Age	Jiangsu	Shandong
2018–2019	Shanghai Golden Age	Beijing BAIC Motor	Jiangsu
2017–2018	Shanghai Golden Age	Beijing BAIC Motor	Sichuan
2016–2017	Shanghai Golden Age	Beijing BAIC Motor	Sichuan
2015–2016	Shanghai Golden Age	Beijing BAIC Motor	Shandong
2014–2015	Shanghai Golden Age	Shandong	Beijing BAIC Motor
2013–2014	Beijing BAIC Motor	Shanghai Golden Age	Shandong
2012–2013	Beijing BAIC Motor	Bayi	Henan
2011–2012	Shanghai	Bayi	Liaoning
2010–2011	Shanghai	Jiangsu	Bayi
2009–2010	Shanghai	Bayi	Jiangsu
2008–2009	Shanghai	Henan	Bayi
2007–2008	Shanghai	Liaoning	Henan
2006–2007	Shanghai	Liaoning	Henan
2005–2006	Shanghai	Jiangsu	Bayi
2004–2005	Shanghai	Liaoning	Bayi
2003–2004	Shanghai	Zhejiang	Bayi
2002–2003	Zhejiang	Shanghai	Liaoning
2001–2002	Jiangsu	Zhejiang	Liaoning
2000–2001	Jiangsu	Bayi	Zhejiang
1999–2000	Shanghai	Jiangsu	Bayi
1998–1999	Sichuan	Jiangsu	Chengdu
1997–1998	Sichuan	Jiangsu	Zhejiang
1996–1997	Sichuan	Zhejiang	Liaoning

=== Most valuable player by edition ===
- 2014–2015 – Cristian Savani (ITA)
- 2015–2016 – Thomas Edgar (AUS)
- 2016–2017 – Jiang Chuan (CHN)
- 2017–2018 – Jiang Chuan (CHN)
- 2022–2023 – Liu Ze (CHN)
- 2023–2024 – Peng Shikun (CHN)
- 2024–2025 – Zhang Zhejia (CHN)

=== Titles by clubs ===
Ranking	Team	Titles	Champions Year(s)
1	Shanghai Bright	18	1999/00, 2003/04–2011/12, 2014/15–2019/20, 2023/24–2024/25
2	Beijing BAIC Motor	4	2012/13, 2013/14, 2020/21, 2022/23
3	Sichuan	3	1996/97–1998/99
4	Jiangsu	2	2000/01, 2001/02
5	Zhejiang	1	2002/03
6	Tianjin	1	2025/26

== Women's Super League ==
=== Current clubs (14 teams) ===
The map of the teams participating in the Chinese Volleyball League

=== Teams in Women's League (2025–26) ===
Team	Arena	Capacity	City/Area
Division A
Beijing Arctic Ocean	Beijing Guangcai Stadium	2,800	Beijing
Fujian Anxi Tiekuanyin	Wutong Gymnasium	3,000	Anxi
Henan Shuanghui	Luohe City Sports Center Gymnasium	4,000	Luohe
Jiangsu Zenith Steel	Changzhou University Gymnasium	5,000	Changzhou
Liaoning Donggang Strawberry	Donggang Gymnasium	3,000	Donggang
Shandong Rizhao Steel	Rizhao Xianghe Sports Park	6,000	Rizhao
Shanghai Bright Ubest	Luwan Sports Centre	3,500	Shanghai
Tianjin Bohai Bank	Tianjin People's Stadium	3,400	Tianjin
Division B
Guangdong Shenzhen Zhongsai	Longhua Culture & Sport Center	6,500	Shenzhen
Hebei	Xingrui Gymnasium	4,500	Baoding
Jiangxi Shangrao Aofei	Shangrao Sports Center Gymnasium	3,800	Shangrao
Sichuan	Gao County Cultural and Sports Center	3,000	Gao County
Yunnan University Dianchi College	Qujing Cultural Sports Park Gymnasium	5,000	Qujing
Zhejiang Xitang	Jiashan County Stadium	3,100	Jiashan

=== Winners of Previous Seasons ===
Season	Champions	Runners-up	3rd place
2025–2026	Shanghai Bright Ubest	Jiangsu Zenith Steel	Shandong Rizhao Steel
2024–2025	Jiangsu Zenith Steel	Shanghai Bright Ubest	Liaoning Donggang Strawberry
2023–2024	Tianjin Bohai Bank	Shanghai Bright Ubest	Jiangsu Zenith Steel
2022–2023	Tianjin Bohai Bank	Shanghai Bright Ubest	Shenzhen Zhongsai
2021–2022	Tianjin Bohai Bank	Jiangsu Zenith Steel	Shanghai Bright Ubest
2020–2021	Tianjin Bohai Bank	Jiangsu Zenith Steel	Shanghai Bright Ubest
2019–2020	Tianjin Bohai Bank	Shanghai Bright Ubest	Beijing BAIC Motor
2018–2019	Beijing BAIC Motor	Tianjin Bohai Bank	Shanghai Bright Ubest
2017–2018	Tianjin Bohai Bank	Shanghai Bright Ubest	Jiangsu Zenith Steel
2016–2017	Jiangsu Zenith Steel	Zhejiang Jiashan Rural Commercial Bank	Tianjin Bohai Bank
2015–2016	Tianjin Bohai Bank	Jiangsu Zenith Steel	Shanghai Donghao Lansheng
2014–2015	Bayi (Army) Keming Surface Industry	Shanghai Donghao Lansheng	Jiangsu Zenith Steel
2013–2014	Zhejiang Jiashan Rural Commercial Bank	Tianjin Bohai Bank	Bayi (Army) Keming Surface Industry
2012–2013	Tianjin Bohai Bank	Guangdong Evergrande	Zhejiang New Century
2011–2012	Guangdong Evergrande	Shanghai Guohua Life	Tianjin Bridgestone
2010–2011	Tianjin Bridgestone	Guangdong Evergrande	Shanghai Dunlop
2009–2010	Tianjin Bridgestone	Shanghai Dunlop	Bayi Yiyang
2008–2009	Tianjin Bridgestone	Shanghai Dunlop	Jiangsu ECE
2007–2008	Tianjin Bridgestone	Bayi Yiyang	Shanghai Eastern
2006–2007	Tianjin Bridgestone	Liaoning China Mobile	Jiangsu Yizheng Chemical Fibre
2005–2006	Liaoning China Mobile	Tianjin Bridgestone	Henan
2004–2005	Tianjin Bridgestone	Bayi Yiyang	Zhejiang Yijiai
2003–2004	Tianjin Bridgestone	Bayi Xuezhongfei	Liaoning China Mobile
2002–2003	Tianjin Bridgestone	Bayi Xuezhongfei	Liaoning China Mobile
2001–2002	Bayi Bosideng	Liaoning	Tianjin Bridgestone
2000–2001	Shanghai	Bayi Bosideng	Liaoning
1999–2000	Shanghai	Jiangsu Yizheng Chemical Fibre	Bayi Bosideng
1998–1999	Shanghai	Zhejiang	Sichuan
1997–1998	Shanghai	Jiangsu Yizheng Chemical Fibre	Zhejiang
1996–1997	Shanghai	Jiangsu Yizheng Chemical Fibre	Zhejiang

=== Most valuable player by edition ===
- 1996-1997 – Wang Yi (CHN)
- 1997-1998 – Zhu Yunying (CHN)
- 1998–1999 – Sun Yue (CHN)
- 1999–2000 – vacant
- 2000–2001 – Ma Suo (CHN)
- 2001–2002 – Zhao Ruirui (CHN)
- 2002–2003 – Zhang Ping (CHN)
- 2003–2004 – Yang Hao (CHN)
- 2004–2005 – Zhou Suhong (CHN)
- 2005–2006 – Yang Hao (CHN)
- 2006–2007 – Liu Yanan (CHN)
- 2007–2008 – Li Juan (CHN)
- 2008–2009 – Yin Na (CHN)
- 2009–2010 – Wei Qiuyue (CHN)
- 2010–2011 – Jovana Brakočević (SRB)
- 2011–2012 – Wei Qiuyue (CHN)
- 2012–2013 – Katarzyna Skowrońska (POL)
- 2013–2014 – Li Jing (CHN)
- 2014–2015 – Hui Ruoqi (CHN)
- 2015–2016 – Zhang Changning (CHN)
- 2016–2017 – Zhang Changning (CHN)
- 2017–2018 – Li Yingying (CHN)
- 2018–2019 – vacant
- 2019–2020 – Zhu Ting (CHN)
- 2020–2021 – Zhu Ting (CHN)
- 2021–2022 – Li Yingying (CHN)
- 2022–2023 – Li Yingying (CHN)
- 2023–2024 – Li Yingying (CHN)
- 2024–2025 – Wu Mengjie (CHN)
- 2025–2026 – Wang Weiyi (CHN)

=== Titles by clubs ===
Ranking	Team	Titles	Champions Year(s)
1	Tianjin Bohai Bank	16	2002/03–2004/05, 2006/07–2010/11, 2012/13, 2015/16, 2017/18, 2019/20-2023/24
2	Shanghai Bright Ubest	6	1996/97–2000/01, 2025/26
3	Bayi Shenzhen	2	2001/02, 2014/15
4	Jiangsu Zenith Steel	2	2016/17, 2024/25
5	Liaoning Brilliance Auto	1	2005/06
6	Guangdong Evergrande	1	2011/12
7	Zhejiang Jiashan Rural Commercial Bank	1	2013/14
8	Beijing BAIC Motor	1	2018/19

== Official sponsorship / Kit provider ==
Sponsor seasons	Sponsor
1996–1997	金施爾康
1997–1998	–
1998–2000	Vinda International
2000–2007	BBK Electronics
2007–2010	Anta Sports
2010–2016	361˚
2016–2017	–
2017–2025	Peak Sport Products
2025–present	Anta Sports

== Performance in Asian Club Championship ==
=== Men ===
Main: Asian Men's Club Volleyball Championship

Season	Club	Place	Awards
2021	—N/a	—N/a	—N/a
2020	—N/a	—N/a	—N/a
2019	—N/a	—N/a	—N/a
2018	Sichuan	12th	—N/a
2017	Beijing BAIC Motor	6th	—N/a
2016	Shanghai Golden Age	4th	—N/a
2015	Beijing BAIC Motor	5th	—N/a
2014	Beijing BAIC Motor	3rd	(China) Li Runming (Best Setter)
2013	Liaoning	4th	—N/a
2012	Shanghai Tang Dynasty	2nd	(China) Tong Jiahua (Best Libero)
2011	Shanghai Tang Dynasty	3rd	—N/a
2010	Shanghai Tang Dynasty	4th	—N/a

=== Women ===
Main: Asian Women's Club Volleyball Championship

Season	Club	Place	Awards
2023	Liaoning Donghua	3rd	(China) Wang Lujia (Best Middle Blocker)
2021	—N/a	—N/a	—N/a
2020	—N/a	—N/a	—N/a
2019	Tianjin Bohai Bank	1st	(China) Li Yingying (Most Valuable Player), (Best Outside Spiker); (China) Yao Di (Best Setter); (China) Li Yanan (Best Middle Blocker); (China) Wang Yuanyuan (Best Middle Blocker)
2018	Jiangsu Zenith Steel	3rd	(China) Wang Chenyue (Best Middle Blocker); (China) Rong Wanqianbai (Best Setter)
2017	Tianjin Bohai Bank	3rd	(China) Yao Di (Best Setter)
2016	Bayi Shenzhen	2nd	(China) Liu Yanhan (Best Outside Spiker)
2015	Zhejiang	3rd	(China) Yang Zhou (Best Middle Blocker)
2014	Tianjin Bohai Bank	2nd	(China) Chen Liyi (Best Outside Spiker); (China) Li Ying (Best Opposite Spiker)
2013	Guangdong Evergrande	1st	(China) Xu Yunli (Most Valuable Player), (Best Blocker); (China) Zhou Yuan (Best Spiker), (Best Server); (China) Zhang Xian (Best Libero)
2012	Tianjin Bridgestone	1st	(China) Yin Na (Most Valuable Player); (China) Zhang Xiaoting (Best Spiker); (China) Wang Ning (Best Blocker); (China) Yao Di (Best Setter); (China) Wang Qian (Best Libero)
2011	Tianjin Bridgestone	2nd	(China) Yin Na (Best Spiker); (China) Yao Di (Best Setter)
2010	Tianjin Bridgestone	4th	—N/a
2009	Tianjin Bridgestone	2nd	(China) Chen Liyi (Best Scorer); (China) Yu Jing (Best Libero)
2008	Tianjin Bridgestone	1st	(China) Li Shan (Most Valuable Player); (China) Huo Jing (Best Spiker); (China) Yu Jing (Best Server)

== Performance in FIVB World Club Championship ==
=== Men ===
Main: FIVB Volleyball Men's Club World Championship

Season	Club	Place	Awards
2023	did not qualify		
2022	did not qualify		
2021	did not qualify		
2020	cancelled		
2019	did not qualify		
2018	did not qualify		
2017	Shanghai Golden Age	5th	—N/a
2016	did not qualify		
2015	did not qualify		
2014	did not qualify		
2013	did not qualify		
2012	did not qualify		
2011	did not qualify		
2010	did not qualify		

=== Women ===
Main: FIVB Volleyball Women's Club World Championship

Season	Club	Place	Awards
2024	Tianjin Bohai Bank	2nd	(China) Li Yingying (Best Outside Spiker); (China) Liu Liwen (Best Libero)
2023	Tianjin Bohai Bank	3rd	(China) Li Yingying (Best Outside Spiker)
2022	did not qualify		
2021	did not qualify		
2020	cancelled		
2019	Guangdong Evergrande; Tianjin Bohai Bank	7th 8th	—N/a
2018	Zhejiang	7th	—N/a
2017	did not qualify		
2016	did not qualify		
2015	did not qualify		
2014	did not qualify		
2013	Guangdong Evergrande	3rd	(China) Shen Jingsi (Best Setter)
2012	Tianjin Bohai Bank	5th	—N/a
2011	did not qualify		
2010	did not qualify		

== See also ==
- List of Chinese volleyball players
