= Zhang Changning =

Chinese volleyball and beach volleyball player (born 1995)

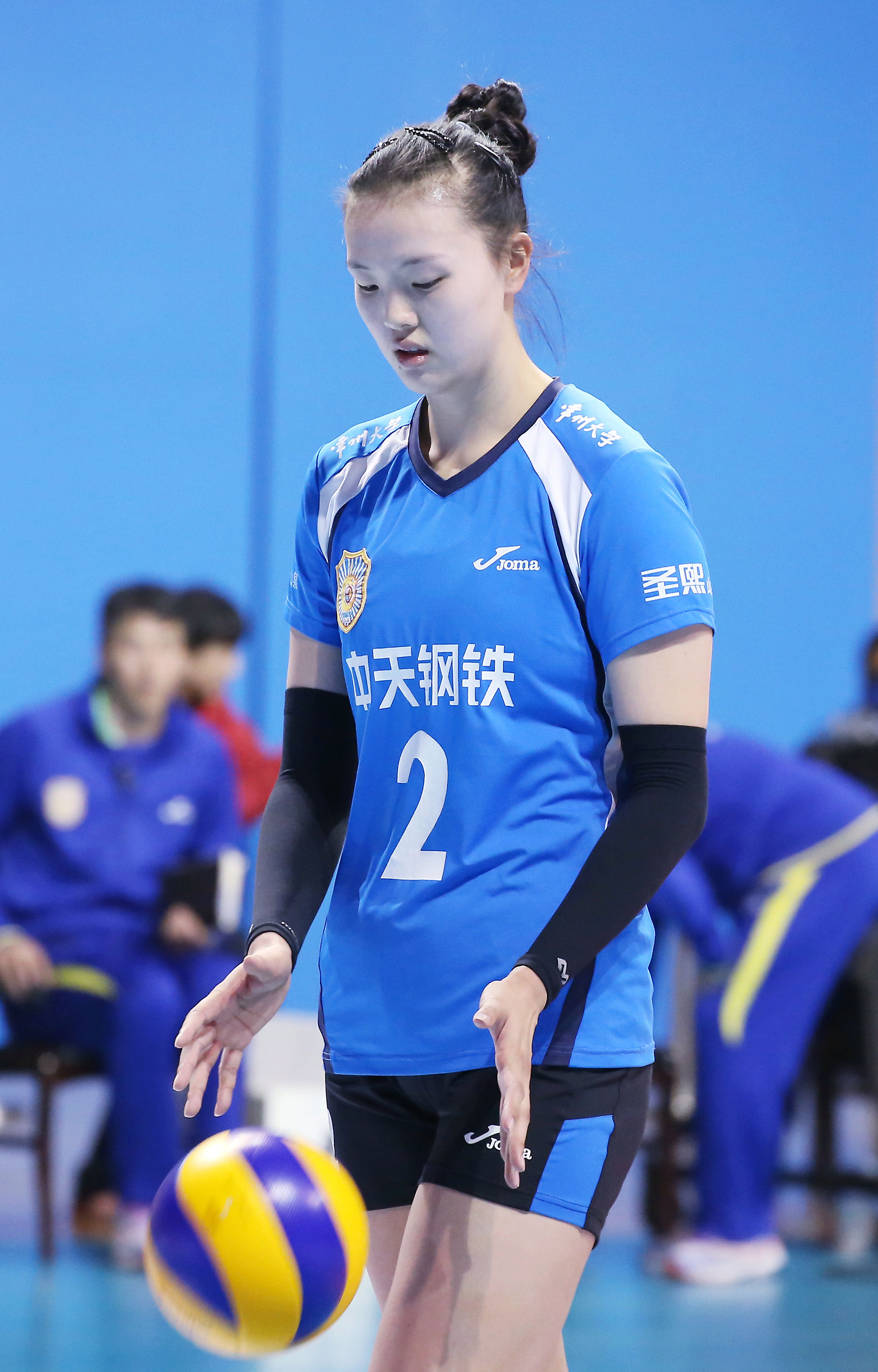
- Zhang in 2017

Personal information
- Nickname: Baby Face (宝宝)
- Nationality: Chinese
- Born: 6 November 1995 (age 30) Changzhou, Jiangsu
- Home town: Nanjing, Jiangsu
- Height: 1.95 m (6 ft 5 in)
- Weight: 80 kg (176 lb)
- Spike: 325 cm (128 in)
- Block: 315 cm (124 in)

Volleyball information
- Position: Outside Spiker; Opposite Spiker
- Current club: Jiangsu Zenith Steel
- Number: 9

Career
- Years: Team
- 2014–: Jiangsu Zenith Steel

National team
- Years: Team
- 2014–2021, 2024: China
Honours
Volleyball
Olympic Games
Gold medal – first place	2016 Rio de Janeiro	Team
World Championship
Bronze medal – third place	2018 Japan	Team
FIVB World Cup
Gold medal – first place	2019 Japan	Team
Gold medal – first place	2015 Japan	Team
World Grand Champions Cup
Gold medal – first place	2017 Japan	Team
Asian Games
Silver medal – second place	2014 Incheon
Asian Championship
Gold medal – first place	2015 Tianjin
AVC Cup Championship
Gold medal – first place	2014 Shenzhen
Gold medal – first place	2016 Vinh Phuc

Zhang Changning (simplified Chinese: 张常宁; traditional Chinese: 張常寧; pinyin: Zhāng Chángníng; born 6 November 1995) is a Chinese indoor volleyball and beach volleyball player. She is a member of China women's national volleyball team. At the club level, she plays for Jiangsu Zenith Steel.

== Personal life ==
She was born in Changzhou and raised in Nanjing. She is the daughter of Zhang Yousheng, a former player of China men's national volleyball team, and Jiang Hanqiu, a college physical education teacher. Her elder brother Zhang Chen is a current player of China men's national volleyball team. Along with her Jiangsu teammates Hui Ruoqi and Gong Xiangyu, she attended Nanjing Normal University. She married basketball player, Wu Guanxi, on 30 July 2022.

== Beach volleyball ==
Although she started as an indoor player, she was offered to join the national beach volleyball team in 2009. As a beach volleyball player she teamed with Ji Linjun in 2009, and with Ma Yuanyuan in 2010 and 2011 winning the silver medal at the 2011 Asian Beach Volleyball Championship. Later in 2011 she competed with Ding Jingjing at the Visa FIVB Beach Volleyball International.

== 2013 ban ==
In early 2013 she decided to switch from beach volleyball to indoor volleyball. She was pressured by national and provincial volleyball bureaus to reconsider her decision. Refusing to return to beach volleyball, she was banned from competition and faced a possible early retirement from her athletic career. Due to massive backlash from provincial media, and because of the Jiangsu team's historically low performance in the 2013-2014 season, the ban was lifted on December 29, 2013 and she has since been playing for Jiangsu in the CVL.

== Indoor volleyball ==
In 2014, she was promoted by Coach Lang Ping to the national team. She represented China at the 2014 Asian Games. She was part of the Team China that won gold at the 2015 FIVB Volleyball Women's World Cup. She represented China at the 2016 Summer Olympics playing as an outside hitter and an opposite hitter and won the gold medal. She participated at the 2019 Montreux Volley Masters,

She was voted CVL's MVP and Most Popular Player in the 2015-2016 season.
