= 2018–19 Chinese Men's Volleyball Super League =

- League: Chinese Men's Volleyball Super League
- Sport: Volleyball
- Duration: Oct 22, 2018 – Feb 27, 2019
- Teams: 14

Regular season
- Season champions: Beijing BAIC Motor
- Runners-up: Shanghai Golden Age
- Top scorer: (China) Jiang Chuan (BEI)

Finals
- Champions: Shanghai Golden Age
- Runners-up: Beijing BAIC Motor

Chinese Men's Volleyball Super League seasons
- 2017–18 2019–20

The 2018–19 Chinese Men's Volleyball Super League is the 23rd season of the Chinese Men's Volleyball Super League, the highest professional volleyball league in China. The season began on 22 October 2018 and ended with the Finals on 27 February 2019. Shanghai Golden Age are the defending champions.

On 27 February 2019, Shanghai Golden Age won their 15th Chinese Men's Volleyball Super League title, after defeating Beijing BAIC Motor in the final, 3–0 (3–0, 3–2, 3–0).

== Clubs ==
=== Clubs and locations ===
The map of the teams participating in the 2018–19 Chinese Volleyball League

Team	Stadium	Capacity	City/Area
Bayi Nanchang	Wenchang Stadium		Nanchang
Beijing Baic Motor	Beijing Guangcai Stadium	2,800	Beijing
Fujian Normal University	Fujian Normal University General Gymnasium	3,000	Fuqing
Guangdong Shenzhen Baoan Hejie	Shenzhen Sports Center	5,000	Shenzhen
Hebei	Xingtai City Stadium	4,500	Xingtai
Henan Tianguan	Nanyang Sports Center Gymnasium	5,880	Nanyang
Hubei	Hubei Institute of Engineering Gymnasium		Xiaogan
Jiangsu	Nanjing University Gymnasium	3,954	Nanjing
Liaoning Yingkou Bayuquan	Weinan Sports Training Base	4,000	Shenyang
Shandong Sports Lottery	Zibo Sports Center Complex	6,000	Zibo
Shanghai Golden Age	Luwan Sports Centre	3,500	Shanghai
Sichuan Volleyball	Shuangliu Sports Center	3,400	Chengdu
Tianjin Quanyuncun	Tianjin People's Stadium	3,400	Tianjin
Zhejiang Sports Lottery	Deqing Sports Center Gymnasium		Huzhou

== Regular season ==
=== First stage ===
==== Group A ====
Pos	Team	Pld	W	L	Pts	SW	SL	SR	SPW	SPL	SPR
1	Zhejiang Sports Lottery	6	5	1	14	15	8	1.875	530	503	1.054
2	Bayi Nanchang	6	4	2	12	13	7	1.857	474	438	1.082
3	Shanghai Golden Age	6	4	2	12	13	8	1.625	480	440	1.091
4	Henan Tianguan	6	4	2	12	14	9	1.556	538	510	1.055
5	Tianjin Quanyuncun	6	3	3	8	12	14	0.857	576	563	1.023
6	Guangdong Shenzhen Baoan Hejie	6	1	5	3	7	16	0.438	496	547	0.907
7	Fujian Normal University	6	0	6	1	6	18	0.333	473	566	0.836

Updated to match(es) played on 28 October 2018. Source: Ranking Table Group A

Home \ Away	ZHE	BAY	SHH	HEN	TIA	GUA	FUJ
Zhejiang Sports Lottery		3–0				1–3	3–1
Bayi Nanchang			3–0	3–1	1–3		
Shanghai Golden Age	1–3			3–2	3–2		
Henan Tianguan	0–3					1–3	3–1
Tianjin Quanyuncun	3–0			3–0			3–2
Guangdong Shenzhen Baoan Hejie		0–3	3–2		3–0		
Fujian Normal University		0–3	1–3			1–3	

Legend: Blue = home team win; Yellow = draw; Red = away team win.

==== Group B ====
Pos	Team	Pld	W	L	Pts	SW	SL	SR	SPW	SPL	SPR
1	Beijing BAIC Motor	6	5	1	16	17	4	4.250	505	395	1.278
2	Jiangsu	6	5	1	14	15	6	2.500	472	423	1.116
3	Shandong Sports Lottery	6	4	2	12	15	8	1.875	528	466	1.133
4	Sichuan	6	4	2	11	14	11	1.273	541	541	1.000
5	Hebei	6	2	4	5	6	15	0.400	428	476	0.899
6	Liaoning Yingkou Bayuquan	6	1	5	3	5	16	0.313	422	512	0.824
7	Hubei	6	0	6	2	6	18	0.333	482	565	0.853

Updated to match(es) played on 28 October 2018. Source: Ranking Table Group B

Home \ Away	BEI	JIA	SHA	SIC	HUB	LIA	HEB
Beijing BAIC Motor		3–0	2–3				3–0
Jiangsu				2–3	3–0	3–2	
Shandong Sports Lottery		2–3			3–0	3–0	
Sichuan	0–3		3–1				3–0
Hebei	0–3		3–1				3–0
Liaoning Yingkou Bayuquan	1–3			0–3	2–3		
Hubei		1–3	0–3			3–1	

Legend: Blue = home team win; Yellow = draw; Red = away team win.

=== Second stage ===
==== Top eight ====
Pos	Team	Pld	W	L	Pts	SW	SL	SR	SPW	SPL	SPR	Qualification
1	Beijing BAIC Motor	14	13	1	38	1084	12	90.333	1281	1084	1.182	Ranking Table Top eight
2	Shanghai Golden Age	14	12	2	35	38	15	2.533	1259	1100	1.145	Ranking Table Top eight
3	Jiangsu	14	10	4	27	32	21	1.524	1204	1192	1.010	Ranking Table Top eight
4	Shandong Sports Lottery	14	7	7	24	32	24	1.333	1253	1236	1.014	Ranking Table Top eight
5	Bayi Nanchang	14	6	8	19	28	31	0.903	1294	1293	1.001	
6	Sichuan	14	4	10	9	16	37	0.432	1101	1239	0.889	
7	Zhejiang Sports Lottery	14	3	11	10	17	35	0.486	1134	1212	0.936	
8	Henan Tianguan	14	1	13	6	12	40	0.300	1093	1263	0.865	

Updated to match(es) played on 9 January 2019. Source:

==== Bottom six ====
Pos	Team	Pld	W	L	Pts	SW	SL	SR	SPW	SPL	SPR
1	Tianjin Quanyuncun	10	9	1	25	28	12	2.333	928	829	1.119
2	Guangdong Shenzhen Baoan Hejie	10	8	2	25	27	9	3.000	854	720	1.186
3	Hebei	10	4	6	12	14	22	0.636	738	816	0.904
4	Liaoning Yingkou Bayuquan	0	0	0	0	0	0	—	0	0	—
5	Fujian Normal University	0	0	0	0	0	0	—	0	0	—
6	Hubei	0	0	0	0	0	0	—	0	0	—

Updated to match(es) played on 12 December 2018. Source: Ranking Table Top six

== Final stage ==
- Best-of-five series

=== Bracket ===
Final four
1	Beijing BAIC Motor	3	3	3
4	Shandong Sports Lottery	0	1	0
2	Shanghai Golden Age	3	3	3
3	Jiangsu	1	1	0

Final
1	Beijing BAIC Motor	0	2	0
2	Shanghai Golden Age	3	3	3
3rd place match
4	Shandong Sports Lottery	1	0
3	Jiangsu	3	3

=== Third stage ===
==== Final four ====
- (1) Beijing BAIC Motor vs (4) Shandong Sports Lottery

Date	Time		Score		Set 1	Set 2	Set 3	Set 4	Set 5	Total	Report
20 Jan	16:00	Beijing BAIC Motor	3–0	Shandong Sports Lottery	25–17	25–21	25–15			75–53	
27 Jan	16:00	Shandong Sports Lottery	1–3	Beijing BAIC Motor	22–25	25–22	19–25	21–25		87–97	
30 Jan	19:30	Shandong Sports Lottery	0–3	Beijing BAIC Motor	20–25	19–25	20–25			59–75	

- (2) Shanghai Golden Age vs (3) Jiangsu

Date	Time		Score		Set 1	Set 2	Set 3	Set 4	Set 5	Total	Report
20 Jan	16:00	Shanghai Golden Age	3–1	Jiangsu	25–21	17–25	25–18	26–24		93–88	
27 Jan	16:00	Jiangsu	1–3	Shanghai Golden Age	20–25	10–25	25–23	20–25		75–98	
30 Jan	19:30	Jiangsu	0–3	Shanghai Golden Age	17–25	19–25	23–25			59–75	

=== Fourth stage ===
==== 3rd place match ====
- Best-of-three series

Date	Time		Score		Set 1	Set 2	Set 3	Set 4	Set 5	Total	Report
17 Feb	16:00	Jiangsu	3–0	Shandong Sports Lottery	25–22	25–18	26–24			76–64	
24 Feb	20:30	Shandong Sports Lottery	1–3	Jiangsu	28–30	20–25	25–21	19–25		92–101	

==== Final ====
- Best-of-five series

Date	Time		Score		Set 1	Set 2	Set 3	Set 4	Set 5	Total	Report
17 Feb	16:00	Beijing BAIC Motor	0–3	Shanghai Golden Age	21–25	16–25	18–25			55–75	
24 Feb	16:00	Shanghai Golden Age	3–2	Beijing BAIC Motor	25–21	17–25	25–21	18–25	21–19	106–111	
27 Feb	19:30	Shanghai Golden Age	3–0	Beijing BAIC Motor	25–23	25–17	25–23			75–63	

== Final standing ==
Rank	Team
1st place, gold medalist(s)	Shanghai Golden Age
2nd place, silver medalist(s)	Beijing BAIC Motor
3rd place, bronze medalist(s)	Jiangsu
4	Shandong Sports Lottery
5	Bayi Nanchang
6	Sichuan
7	Zhejiang Sports Lottery
8	Henan Tianguan
9	Tianjin Quanyuncun
10	Guangdong Shenzhen Baoan Hejie
11	Hebei
12	Liaoning Yingkou Bayuquan
13	Fujian Normal University
14	Hubei

2018–19 Chinese Men's Volleyball Super League champions

15th title
