= Cristian Savani =

Italian volleyball player (born 1982)

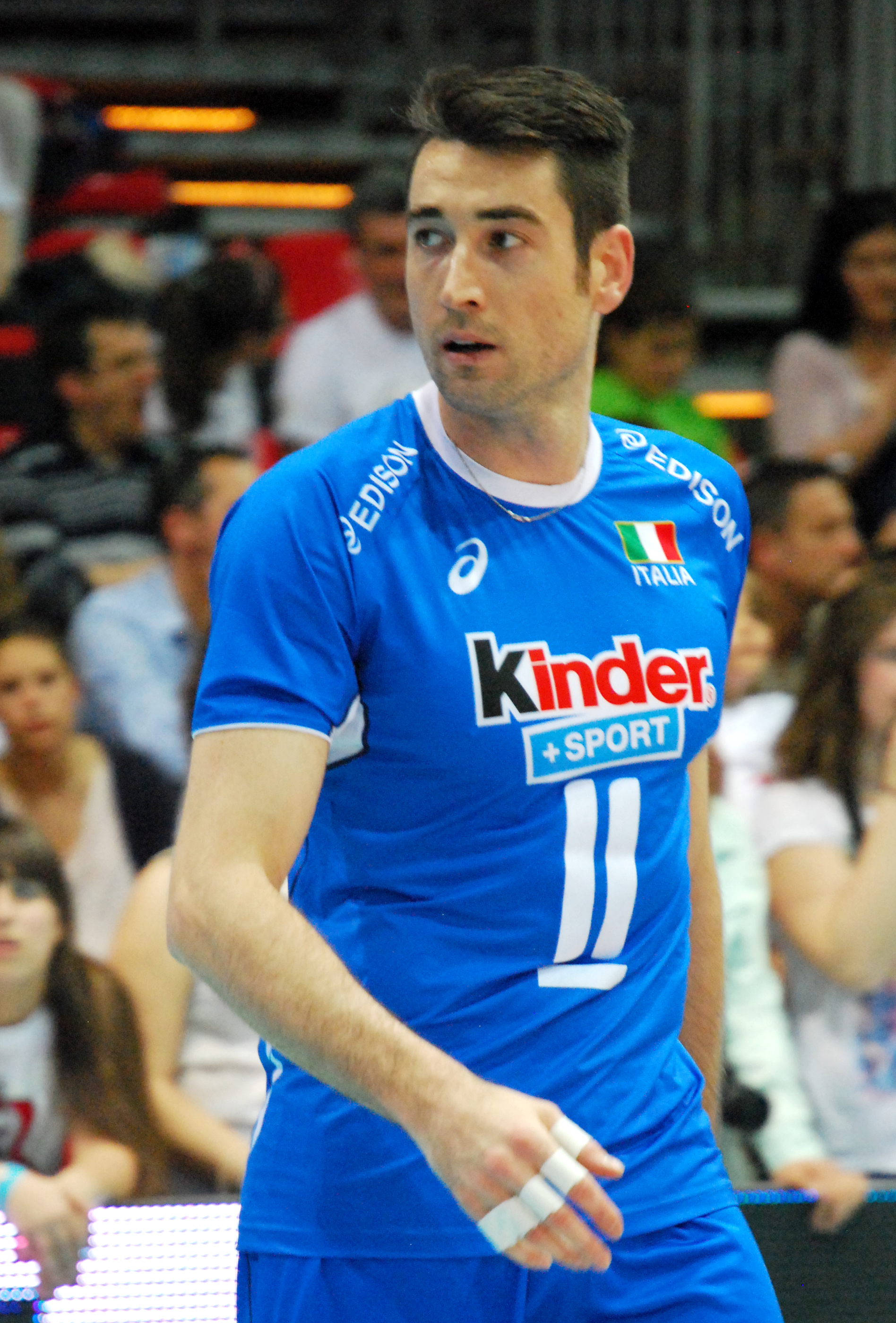
- Savani as Italy captain in 2013

Personal information
- Full name: Cristian Savani
- Nationality: (Italy) Italian
- Born: 22 February 1982 (age 44); Castiglione delle Stiviere, Italy
- Height: 1.96 m (6 ft 5 in)
- Spike: 354 cm (139 in)
- Block: 335 cm (132 in)

Volleyball information
- Position: Outside hitter
- Current team: BluVolley Verona
- Number: 11

Career
Years	Teams
2001–2004; 2004–2006; 2006–2008; 2008–2010; 2010–2013; 2013–2014; 2014–2014; 2014–2016; 2016–2017; 2017–2018; 2018–	Gabeca Montichiari; Itas Diatec Trentino; M. Roma Volley; Sir Safety Perugia; Lube Banca Macerata; Fudan University Shanghai; Al Rayyan; Fudan University Shanghai; Ziraat Bankası Ankara; Taiwan Excellence Latina; BluVolley Verona

National team
2001–2013	Italy (231)
Honours
Men's volleyball
Representing Italy
Olympic Games
Bronze medal – third place	2012 London
European Championship
Gold medal – first place	2003 Germany
Gold medal – first place	2005 Italy/Serbia and Montenegro
Silver medal – second place	2011 Austria/Czech Republic
Silver medal – second place	2013 Denmark/Poland
World League
Silver medal – second place	2004 Rome
Bronze medal – third place	2003 Madrid
Bronze medal – third place	2013 Mar del Plata
- Last updated: 6 October 2017

Cristian Savani (born 22 February 1982) is an Italian volleyball player, a member of Italy men's national volleyball team in 2001–2013 and Italian club BluVolley Verona, a medalist of the Olympic Games (bronze in 2012), 2012 Italian Champion, double Chinese Champion (2015, 2016).

He announced his retirement as professional volleyball player on 1 May 2020 on his instagram account.

== Career ==
Cristian Savani in National team and Serie A1 plays since 2001. In the Italian league his debut was in team from Montichiari from which went for two years to Itas Diatec Trentino and first national team match against Bulgaria.

== Personal life ==
Savani was born in Castiglione delle Stiviere, Italy. He is married to Mihaela Travica (Dragan's sister, Ljubomir's daughter). On 4 April 2013 his wife gave birth to their first child - daughter named Mia.

== Sporting achievements ==
=== Clubs ===
==== CEV Cup ====
- 2007/2008 with M. Roma Volley

==== Challenge Cup ====
- 2009/2010 with Sir Safety Perugia
- 2010/2011 with Lube Banca Macerata

==== AVC Asian Club Championship ====
- 2014 - with Fudan University Shanghai

==== National championships ====
- 2011/2012 Italian Championship, with Lube Banca Macerata
- 2012/2013 Italian SuperCup 2012, with Lube Banca Macerata
- 2013/2014 Chinese Championship, with Fudan University Shanghai
- 2014/2015 Chinese Championship, with Fudan University Shanghai
- 2015/2016 Chinese Championship, with Fudan University Shanghai

=== National team ===
- 2003 FIVB World League
- 2003 CEV European Championship
- 2005 CEV European Championship
- 2011 CEV European Championship
- 2012 Olympic Games
- 2013 FIVB World League
- 2013 CEV European Championship

=== Individually ===
- 2010 CEV Challenge Cup – Best Server
- 2011 World Cup – Best Server
- 2012 Olympic Games London – Best Server
- 2014 Asian Club Championship – Best Outside Spikers
- 2015 CVL League – Best Outside Spikers
- 2015 CVL League – Most Valuable Player
