= Gideon Angiro =

Ugandan volleyball player (born 2000)

Personal information
- Full name: Gideon Angiro Nespal
- Nationality: Ugandan
- Born: February 2, 2000 (age 26)
- Hometown: , Uganda
- Height: 200 cm (6 ft 7 in)
- Weight: 70 kg (154 lb)
- Spike: 360 cm (142 in)
- Block: 345 cm (136 in)

Volleyball information
- Position: Outside Hitter
- Current team: Rwanda Energy Group Volleyball Club

Career
Years	Teams
2018-2019	Nemostars
2020-2021	KCCA
2022-2023	Partizani Tirana
2023	APR
2025	Rwanda Energy Group

National team
Uganda (2021 African Nations Championship participant)

Gideon Angiro Nespal (born February 2, 2000) is a Ugandan volleyball player who plays as an outside hitter for Rwanda Energy Group Volleyball Club in Rwanda.

Gideon Angiro participated in the 2021 African Nations Volleyball Championship, which took place in Kigali, Rwanda.

== Club career ==
Gideon began his senior club career with Nemostars in 2018–2019, playing as an outside hitter in Uganda's domestic league. In 2020–2021, Gideon moved to KCCA, where he was named in the national team squad for the African Nations Championship in 2021. He played volleyball in Albania for the team Partizani Tirana during the 2021/22 season. Early 2023,Gideon joined UCU Doves and became the team captain. In May 2023, he signed a short-term three-month ITC contract with APR, the volleyball team of the Rwandan army. In January 2025, Gideon joined Rwanda Energy Group Volleyball Club in Rwanda.

== International career ==
Gideon Angiro played for Uganda's national volleyball team at the 2021 African Nations Championship.

== Achievements and honors ==
MVP and Best Attacker at the 2024 NSSF KAVC International Tournament

Gideon won the Rwanda Liberation Cup with APR Volleyball Club in July 2023

He played in the 2021 African Nations Volleyball Championship held in Kigali, Rwanda
