= Jiang Chuan =

Chinese volleyball player (born 1994)

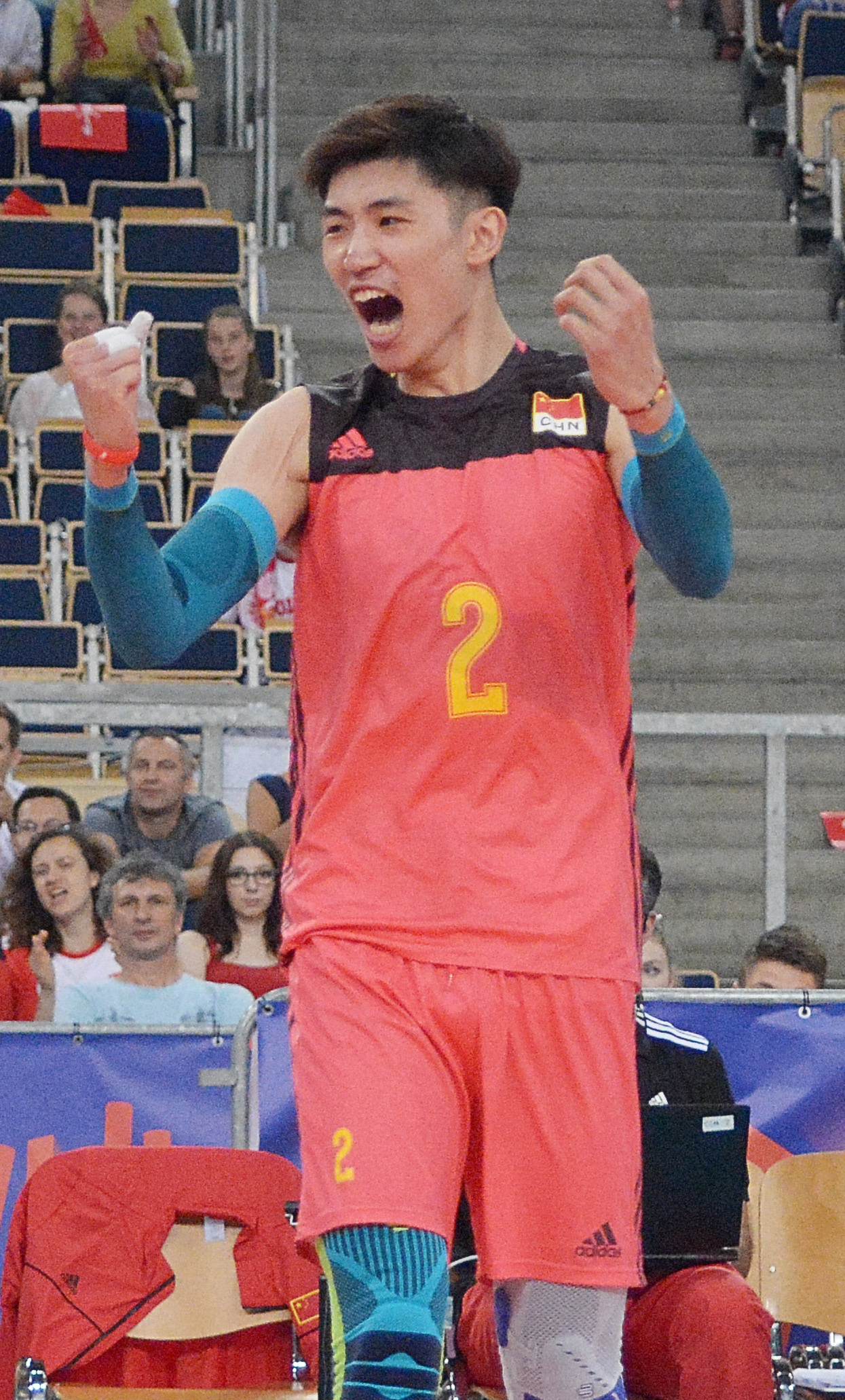

Personal information
- Full name: 江川
- Nationality: Chinese
- Born: 9 August 1994 (age 32); Beijing, China
- Hometown: Beijing, China
- Height: 204 cm (6 ft 8 in)
- Weight: 90 kg (198 lb)
- Spike: 353 cm (139 in)
- Block: 335 cm (132 in)

Volleyball information
- Position: Opposite spiker
- Current club: JT Thunders
- Number: 2 (National Team); 19 (Club)

Career
Years	Teams
2014–2022	(China) Beijing Baic Motor
2017	(China) Shanghai Golden Age (loaned)
2022–present	(Japan) JT Thunders

National team
2016–present	China
Honours
Men's volleyball
Representing China
FIVB Challenger Cup
Gold medal – first place	2024 Linyi
Asian Championship
Bronze medal – third place	2021 Chiba/Funabashi	Team
Asian Games
Silver medal – second place	2022 Hangzhou	Team
Asian Cup
Silver medal – second place	2016 Nakhon Pathom	Team
- Last updated: October 28, 2021

Jiang Chuan (Chinese: 江川; born August 9, 1994, in Beijing) is a male Chinese volleyball player. He is the captain of China men's national volleyball team. On club level he plays for JT Thunders Hiroshima in V.League Division 1.

== Career ==
Jiang was selected to China men's national volleyball team since 2016. He represented China to participate in 2016 Asian Men's Volleyball Cup, which was his first international match. He performed well and was awarded Best Opposite Spiker.

In 2017, Jiang played at Group 2 of 2017 FIVB Volleyball World League, he was totally scored 164 points in the tournament, which made him ranked at third place on the Best Scorers List.

In 2018, Jiang has an outstanding performance in 2018 FIVB Volleyball Men's Nations League, he scored 274 points in the tournament, finally ranked the top scorer while the Preliminary round is finished.

In the late of 2019, it was announced that he would be the new captain of Chinese national team.

== Personal life ==
On October 24, 2021, he held his marriage ceremony with his girlfriend whom he had dated for three years.

== Awards ==
=== Clubs ===
- 2013 National Games of China — Champion, with Beijing Junior
- 2014–2015 Chinese Volleyball League — Bronze medal, with Beijing
- 2015–2016 Chinese Volleyball League — Runner-Up, with Beijing
- 2016–2017 Chinese Volleyball League — Runner-Up, with Beijing
- 2017 National Games of China — Runner-Up, with Beijing
- 2017–2018 Chinese Volleyball League — Runner-Up, with Beijing
- 2018–2019 Chinese Volleyball League — Runner-Up, with Beijing

=== Individual ===
- 2016 AVC Cup — Best Opposite Spiker

== See also ==
- Profile in 2017 World League
