= Wang Chen (volleyball) =

Chinese volleyball player

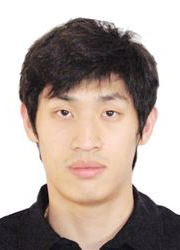

Personal information
- Nationality: Chinese
- Born: 16 November 1987 (age 38) Shanxi, China
- Home town: Beijing
- Height: 196 cm (6 ft 5 in)
- Spike: 340 cm (134 in)
- Block: 330 cm (130 in)

Volleyball information
- Position: Opposite Spiker
- Current club: Beijing Baic Motor
- Number: 12

Career
- Years: Team
- 2009 - 2014 2014 - 2015 2015 - present: Beijing Baic Motor; Vero Volley Monza; Beijing Baic Motor

National team
- Years: Team
- 2012: China
Honours
Men's volleyball
Representing China
Asian Cup
Gold medal – first place	2012 Vĩnh Yên
- Updated on February 20, 2019

Wang Chen (Chinese: 王琛; born November 16, 1987, in Shanxi) is a male Chinese volleyball player. He was one of the member of China men's national volleyball team in 2012. On the club level, he plays for Beijing Baic Motor.

== Career ==
As the substitute of the previous opposite spiker, Sun Quan, Wang participated in Chinese Volleyball League from 2009 to 2011. Later, Wang became the main opposite spiker and helped Beijing Baic Motor get three champions including two leagues (Season 12/13 and Season 13/14) and the senior event of 2013 National Games of China. He joined Vero Volley Monza in Season 2014/2015 though he only got 60 scores in 40 sets.

In 2012, Wang participated in 2012 AVC Cup, as the substitute player of Dai Qingyao.

Before 2016 Summer Olympics, Wang is the accompany trainer of China women's national volleyball team in order to copy Euramerican female opposite spikers.

== Awards ==
=== Clubs ===
- 2012–2013 Chinese Volleyball League - Champion, with Beijing
- 2013 National Games of China - Champion, with Beijing
- 2013–2014 Chinese Volleyball League - Champion, with Beijing
- 2015–2016 Chinese Volleyball League - Runner-Up, with Beijing
- 2016–2017 Chinese Volleyball League - Runner-Up, with Beijing
- 2017 National Games of China - Runner-Up, with Beijing
- 2017–2018 Chinese Volleyball League - Runner-Up, with Beijing
- 2018–2019 Chinese Volleyball League - Runner-Up, with Beijing

== See also ==
- Profile in 2018–2019 Chinese Volleyball League
