= Li Yingying (volleyball) =

Chinese volleyball player (born 2000)

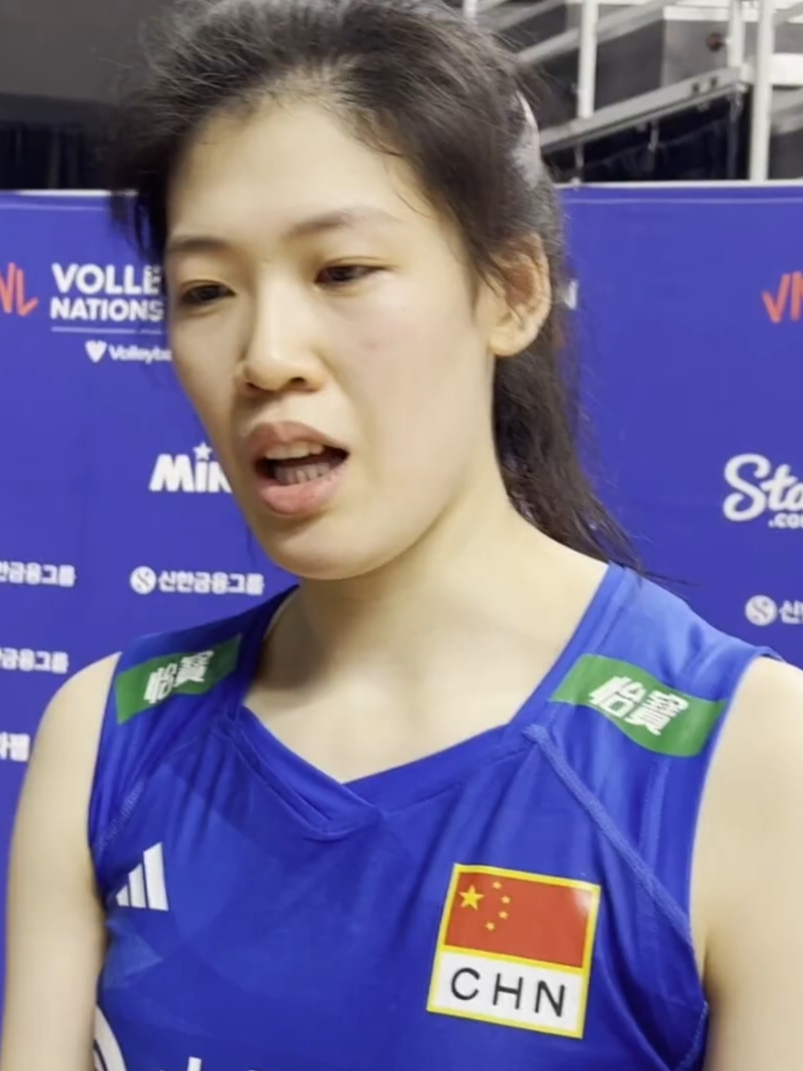

Personal information
- Full name: 李盈莹
- Nationality: Chinese
- Born: 19 February 2000 (age 26); Qiqihar, Heilongjiang
- Hometown: Qiqihar, Heilongjiang
- Height: 192 cm (6 ft 4 in)
- Weight: 71 kg (157 lb)
- Spike: 302 cm (119 in)
- Block: 294 cm (116 in)

Volleyball information
- Position: Outside hitter
- Current club: (China) Tianjin Bohai Bank
- Number: 12 (National Team)

Career
| Years | Teams |
|---|---|
| 2015 – | (China) Tianjin Bohai Bank |

National team
| 2014–2015; 2018– | China U18; China |
Honours
Women's volleyball
Representing China
World Championship
| Bronze medal – third place | 2018 Japan | Team |
FIVB World Cup
| Gold medal – first place | 2019 Japan | Team |
Volleyball Nations League
| Silver medal – second place | 2023 Arlington | Team |
| Bronze medal – third place | 2018 Nanjing | Team |
Asian Games
| Gold medal – first place | 2018 Jakarta-Palembang |
| Gold medal – first place | 2022 Hangzhou | Team |
U18 World Championship
| Bronze medal – third place | 2015 Peru |
- Last updated: November 2025

Li Yingying (Chinese: 李盈莹; born February 19, 2000, in Qiqihar, Heilongjiang) is a Chinese volleyball player. She is the outside hitter of China women's national volleyball team. Currently she plays for Tianjin Bohai Bank.

== Career ==
Li’s sports career began in 2014, when she joined the Chinese U18 girls' volleyball team. They won the bronze medal at the 2015 FIVB Volleyball Girls' U18 World Championship and she was awarded Best Outside Spiker of the tournament.

In 2016, Li began professional career with Tianjin, a top team that plays in the Chinese League.

In 2018, Li joined the senior National Team, won the bronze medal at the 2018 FIVB Volleyball Women's Nations League and 2018 FIVB Volleyball Women's World Championship.

In 2019 she was selected to the World Cup team roster and won gold medal with the team.

In 2020, she was selected to the Tokyo Olympics Chinese team roster, which was her first appearance at Olympic Games.

In 2023 FIVB Women's Volleyball Nations League, she was awarded Best Outside Spiker and won silver medal with the team.

In 2024, she was selected to the Paris Olympics roster, which was her second appearance at Olympic Games.

== Awards ==
=== Individual ===
- 2014 Asian Youth Championship "Best outside spiker"
- 2015 FIVB Volleyball Girls' U18 World Championship "Best outside spiker"
- 2017 Junior National Games of China "Most valuable player"
- 2017–2018 Chinese Volleyball League "Most valuable player"
- 2017–2018 Chinese Volleyball League "Best scorer"
- 2018–2019 Chinese Volleyball League "Best scorer"
- 2019 Asian Club Championship "Most valuable player"
- 2019 Asian Club Championship "Best outside spiker"
- 2019–20 Chinese Volleyball League "Best outside spiker"
- 2020–21 Chinese Volleyball League "Best outside spiker"
- 2021–22 Chinese Volleyball League "Most valuable player"
- 2021–22 Chinese Volleyball League "Best outside spiker"
- 2022–23 Chinese Volleyball League "Most valuable player"
- 2022–23 Chinese Volleyball League "Best outside spiker"
- 2023 FIVB Volleyball Women's Nations League "Best Outside Spiker"
- 2023 FIVB Volleyball Women's Club World Championship "Best Outside Spiker"
- 2023–24 Chinese Volleyball League "Most valuable player"
- 2023–24 Chinese Volleyball League "Best outside spiker"
- 2024 FIVB Volleyball Women's Club World Championship "Best Outside Spiker"
- 2024–25 Chinese Volleyball League "Best outside spiker"

=== National team ===
- 2014 Asian Girls' U17 Volleyball Championship: - Bronze medal
- 2015 FIVB Volleyball Girls' U18 World Championship: - Bronze medal
- 2018 FIVB Volleyball Women's Nations League： - Bronze medal
- 2018 Asian Games： - Gold medal
- 2018 FIVB Volleyball Women's World Championship: - Bronze medal
- 2019 FIVB Volleyball Women's World Cup： - Gold medal
- 2023 FIVB Volleyball Women's Nations League： - Silver medal
- 2022 Asian Games： - Gold medal

=== Club ===
- 2016–2017 Chinese Volleyball League - Bronze medal, with Tianjin
- 2017 National Games of China - Gold medal, with Tianjin Junior
- 2017–2018 Chinese Volleyball League - Gold medal, with Tianjin
- 2018–2019 Chinese Volleyball League - Silver medal, with Tianjin
- 2019–2020 Chinese Volleyball League - Gold medal, with Tianjin
- 2019 Asian Women's Club Volleyball Championship - Gold medal, with Tianjin
- 2020–2021 Chinese Volleyball League - Gold medal, with Tianjin
- 2021 National Games of China - Gold medal, with Tianjin
- 2021–2022 Chinese Volleyball League - Gold medal, with Tianjin
- 2022–2023 Chinese Volleyball League - Gold medal, with Tianjin
- 2023 FIVB Volleyball Women's Club World Championship - Bronze medal, with Tianjin
- 2023–2024 Chinese Volleyball League - Gold medal, with Tianjin
- 2024 FIVB Volleyball Women's Club World Championship - Silver medal, with Tianjin
