= Wu Mengjie =

Chinese volleyball player

Personal information
- Nationality: Chinese
- Born: 10 September 2002 (age 24) Jiangsu
- Home town: Jiangsu
- Height: 190 cm (6 ft 3 in)
- Spike: 329 cm (130 in)
- Block: 311 cm (122 in)

Volleyball information
- Position: Outside hitter
- Current club: (China) Jiangsu
- Number: 1 (NT), 8 (Club)

Career
- Years: Team
- 2022 –: (China) Jiangsu

National team
- Years: Team
- 2023 –: China
Honours
Women's volleyball
Representing China
Summer World University Games
Gold medal – first place	2021 Chengdu	Team
Asian Games
Gold medal – first place	2022 Hangzhou	Team
Gold medal – first place	2026 Aichi/Nagoya	Team
AVC Continental Championship
Silver medal – second place	2023 Nakhon Ratchasima	Team
Silver medal – second place	2026 Tianjin	Team
AVC Cup
Silver medal – second place	2022 Pasig	Team

Wu Mengjie (born 10 September 2002) is a Chinese volleyball player. She represented China at the 2024 Summer Olympics. On club level, she plays for Jiangsu.

== Awards ==
=== Individual ===
- 2022 Asian Women's Volleyball Cup "Best outside spiker"
- 2023 Asian Women's Volleyball Championship "Best outside spiker"
- 2023–24 Chinese Volleyball League "Best outside spiker"
- 2024–25 Chinese Volleyball League "Best outside spiker"
- 2024–25 Chinese Volleyball League "Most valuable player"
- 2025–26 Chinese Volleyball League "Best outside spiker"

=== National team ===
- 2022 Asian Women's Volleyball Cup: - Silver medal
- 2023 Asian Women's Volleyball Championship: - Silver medal
- 2022 Asian Games: - Gold medal
- 2026 AVC Women's Volleyball Continental Championship: - Silver medal

=== Club ===
- 2024–2025 Chinese Volleyball League - Gold medal, with Jiangsu
- 2025–2026 Chinese Volleyball League - - Silver medal, with Jiangsu
