= 2019 Asian Women's Club Volleyball Championship =

Tournament details
- Host country: China
- Dates: 27 April–5 May
- Teams: 10
- Venue: 1 (in 1 host city)

Final positions
- Champions: (China) Tianjin Bohaibank (5th title)
- Runners-up: (Thailand) Generali Supreme Chonburi-E.Tech
- Third place: (Japan) Hisamitsu Springs
- Fourth place: (Kazakhstan) Altay VC

Tournament awards
- MVP: (China) Li Yingying (Tianjin Bohaibank)

The 2019 Asian Women's Club Volleyball Championship was the 20th edition of the Asian Women's Club Volleyball Championship, an annual international volleyball club tournament organised by the Asian Volleyball Confederation (AVC) with Chinese Volleyball Association (CVA). The tournament was held in Tianjin, China, from 27 April to 5 May 2019. The winner of this tournament qualified to 2020 FIVB Volleyball Women's Club World Championship.

== Qualification ==
Following the AVC regulations, the maximum of 16 teams in all AVC events were selected by

- 1 team for the organizer
- 10 teams based on the rankings of the previous championship
- 5 teams from each of 5 zones (with a qualification tournament if needed)

=== Qualified associations ===
Means of qualification	Date	Venue	Vacancies	Qualified
Host country	—N/a	—N/a	1	China
2018 Asian Championship	11–18 July 2018	(Kazakhstan) Ust-Kamenogorsk	7	Thailand; Japan; Kazakhstan; Iran; Vietnam; Chinese Taipei; Sri Lanka
EAZVA representatives	2 February 2019	(Thailand) Bangkok	2	(Hong Kong) Hong Kong^{A} (North Korea) North Korea^{A}
CAZVA representatives	2 February 2019	(Thailand) Bangkok	1	Turkmenistan
Total			11	

^A EAZVA is originally allocated with 1 team, but Indonesia, OZVA, WAZVA and SEAZVA declined to enter. The spot was reallocated to Hong Kong and North Korea.

=== Participating teams ===
The following teams were entered for the tournament.

Association	Team	Domestic league standing
China	Tianjin Bohaibank	
Chinese Taipei	Chinese Taipei	
Hong Kong	Hong Kong, China	
Japan	Hisamitsu Springs	2017–18 V.Premier League winners
Kazakhstan	Altay VC	2018–19 Kazakhstan National Ligue winners
North Korea	April 25 Sports Club	
Sri Lanka	Sri Lanka Air Force	2018 Munchee National Volleyball Championship
Thailand	Generali Supreme Chonburi-E.Tech	2018–19 Women's Volleyball Thailand League runner-up^{B}
Turkmenistan	Binagar	
Vietnam	VTV Bình Điền Long An	2018 Volleyball Vietnam League winners

^B Generali Supreme Chonburi-E.Tech qualified as 2018 winners due to compensation after 2019 FIVB World Championship ineligible rather than Nakhon Ratchasima as 2018–19 Volleyball Thailand League winners.

== Venues ==
Tianjin, China
Wuqing Sport Center Gymnasium
Capacity:

== Preliminary round ==
=== Pool A ===
Pos	Team	Pld	W	L	Pts	SW	SL	SR	SPW	SPL	SPR	Qualification
1	(China) Tianjin Bohaibank (H)	3	3	0	9	9	0	MAX	225	142	1.585	Quarter-finals
2	(Kazakhstan) Altay VC	3	2	1	6	6	3	2.000	212	170	1.247	Quarter-finals
3	Chinese Taipei	3	1	2	3	3	6	0.500	183	198	0.924	Quarter-finals
4	Hong Kong	3	0	3	0	0	9	0.000	115	225	0.511	Quarter-finals

Updated to match(es) played on 1 May 2019. Source: AVC
(H) Host

Date	Time		Score		Set 1	Set 2	Set 3	Set 4	Set 5	Total	Report
27 Apr	14:00	Chinese Taipei	0–3	(Kazakhstan) Altay VC	24–26	18–25	20–25			62–76	P2
27 Apr	19:00	Tianjin Bohaibank (China)	3–0	Hong Kong	25–10	25–12	25–13			75–35	P2
28 Apr	14:00	Hong Kong	0–3	(Kazakhstan) Altay VC	6–25	12–25	15–25			33–75	P2
29 Apr	19:00	Chinese Taipei	0–3	(China) Tianjin Bohaibank	14–25	14–25	18–25			46–75	P2
30 Apr	19:00	Altay VC (Kazakhstan)	0–3	(China) Tianjin Bohaibank	21–25	18–25	22–25			61–75	P2
1 May	11:30	Chinese Taipei	3–0	Hong Kong	25–10	25–15	25–22			75–47	P2

=== Pool B ===
Pos	Team	Pld	W	L	Pts	SW	SL	SR	SPW	SPL	SPR	Qualification
1	(Thailand) Generali Supreme Chonburi-E.Tech	5	4	1	13	14	4	3.500	428	310	1.381	Quarter-finals
2	(Japan) Hisamitsu Springs	5	4	1	12	13	3	4.333	385	246	1.565	Quarter-finals
3	(North Korea) April 25 Sports Club	5	4	1	11	12	6	2.000	415	333	1.246	Quarter-finals
4	(Vietnam) VTV Bình Điền Long An	5	2	3	6	7	9	0.778	314	320	0.981	Quarter-finals
5	Sri Lanka Air Force	5	1	4	3	3	12	0.250	230	350	0.657	9th place
6	(Turkmenistan) Binagar	5	0	5	0	0	15	0.000	162	375	0.432	9th place

Updated to match(es) played on 1 May 2019. Source: AVC

Date	Time		Score		Set 1	Set 2	Set 3	Set 4	Set 5	Total	Report
27 Apr	9:00	Sri Lanka Air Force	0–3	(Japan) Hisamitsu Springs	10–25	7–25	7–25			24–75	P2
27 Apr	11:30	VTV Bình Điền Long An (Vietnam)	3–0	(Turkmenistan) Binagar	25–10	25–11	25–14			75–35	P2
27 Apr	16:30	Generali Supreme Chonburi-E.Tech (Thailand)	2–3	(North Korea) April 25 Sports Club	26–24	25–18	22–25	21–25	12–15	106–107	P2
28 Apr	11:30	Sri Lanka Air Force	3–0	(Turkmenistan) Binagar	25–13	25–22	25–15			75–50	P2
28 Apr	16:30	Generali Supreme Chonburi-E.Tech (Thailand)	3–0	(Vietnam) VTV Bình Điền Long An	25–10	25–11	25–19			75–40	P2
28 Apr	19:00	Hisamitsu Springs (Japan)	3–0	(North Korea) April 25 Sports Club	25–10	25–23	29–27			79–60	P2
29 Apr	11:30	April 25 Sports Club (North Korea)	3–1	(Vietnam) VTV Bình Điền Long An	25–23	23–25	25–18	25–16		98–82	P2
29 Apr	14:00	Binagar (Turkmenistan)	0–3	(Japan) Hisamitsu Springs	7–25	12–25	4–25			23–75	P2
29 Apr	16:30	Generali Supreme Chonburi-E.Tech (Thailand)	3–0	Sri Lanka Air Force	25–20	25–15	25–17			75–52	P2
30 Apr	11:30	April 25 Sports Club (North Korea)	3–0	Sri Lanka Air Force	25–8	25–16	25–18			75–42	P2
30 Apr	14:00	VTV Bình Điền Long An (Vietnam)	0–3	(Japan) Hisamitsu Springs	14–25	12–25	16–25			42–75	P2
30 Apr	16:30	Binagar (Turkmenistan)	0–3	(Thailand) Generali Supreme Chonburi-E.Tech	13–25	14–25	3–25			30–75	P2
1 May	14:00	April 25 Sports Club (North Korea)	3–0	(Turkmenistan) Binagar	25–8	25–8	25–8			75–24	P2
1 May	16:30	Hisamitsu Springs (Japan)	1–3	(Thailand) Generali Supreme Chonburi-E.Tech	16–25	25–22	22–25	18–25		81–97	P2
1 May	19:00	Sri Lanka Air Force	0–3	(Vietnam) VTV Bình Điền Long An	14–25	9–25	14–25			37–75	P2

== Final Round ==
- All times are China National Standard Time (UTC+08:00).

=== 9th-10th places ===
==== 9th place match ====
Date	Time		Score		Set 1	Set 2	Set 3	Set 4	Set 5	Total	Report
4 May	9:00	Sri Lanka Air Force	3–0	(Turkmenistan) Binagar	25–13	25–22	26–24			76–59	P2

=== Final eight ===
Quarterfinals
3 May
(China) Tianjin Bohaibank	3
(Vietnam) VTV Bình Điền Long An	0
3 May
(Japan) Hisamitsu Springs	3
Chinese Taipei	0
3 May
(Kazakhstan) Altay VC	3
(North Korea) April 25 Sports Club	2
3 May
(Thailand) Supreme Chonburi-E.Tech	3
Hong Kong	0

Semifinals
4 May
(China) Tianjin Bohaibank	3
(Japan) Hisamitsu Springs	0
4 May
(Kazakhstan) Altay VC	0
(Thailand) Supreme Chonburi-E.Tech	3

Final
5 May
(China) Tianjin Bohaibank	3
(Thailand) Supreme Chonburi-E.Tech	1
3rd place match
5 May
(Japan) Hisamitsu Springs	3
(Kazakhstan) Altay VC	1

5th–8th semifinals
4 May
(Vietnam) VTV Bình Điền Long An	0
Chinese Taipei	3
4 May
(North Korea) April 25 Sports Club	3
Hong Kong	0

5th place match
5 May
Chinese Taipei	1
(North Korea) April 25 Sports Club	3
7th place match
5 May
(Vietnam) VTV Bình Điền Long An	3
Hong Kong	0

==== Quarterfinals ====
Date	Time		Score		Set 1	Set 2	Set 3	Set 4	Set 5	Total	Report
3 May	11:30	Hisamitsu Springs (Japan)	3–0	Chinese Taipei	25–14	25–13	25–23			75–50	P2
3 May	14:00	Altay VC (Kazakhstan)	3–2	(North Korea) April 25 Sports Club	25–22	15–25	19–25	27–25	15–12	101–109	P2
3 May	16:30	Generali Supreme Chonburi-E.Tech (Thailand)	3–0	Hong Kong	25–12	25–12	25–10			75–34	P2
3 May	19:00	Tianjin Bohaibank (China)	3–0	(Vietnam) VTV Bình Điền Long An	25–21	25–17	25–15			75–53	P2

==== 5th-8th semifinals ====
Date	Time		Score		Set 1	Set 2	Set 3	Set 4	Set 5	Total	Report
4 May	11:30	April 25 Sports Club (North Korea)	3–0	Hong Kong	25–17	25–12	25–12			75–41	P2
4 May	14:00	VTV Bình Điền Long An (Vietnam)	0–3	Chinese Taipei	20–25	22–25	17–25			59–75	P2

==== Semifinals ====
Date	Time		Score		Set 1	Set 2	Set 3	Set 4	Set 5	Total	Report
4 May	16:30	Altay VC (Kazakhstan)	0–3	(Thailand) Generali Supreme Chonburi-E.Tech	23–25	18–25	15–25			56–75	P2
4 May	19:00	Tianjin Bohaibank (China)	3–0	(Japan) Hisamitsu Springs	25–19	25–22	25–16			75–57	P2

==== 7th place match ====
Date	Time		Score		Set 1	Set 2	Set 3	Set 4	Set 5	Total	Report
5 May	11:30	VTV Bình Điền Long An (Vietnam)	3–0	Hong Kong	25–8	25–20	25–21			75–49	P2

==== 5th place match ====
Date	Time		Score		Set 1	Set 2	Set 3	Set 4	Set 5	Total	Report
5 May	14:00	Chinese Taipei	1–3	(North Korea) April 25 Sports Club	25–27	23–25	25–20	22–25		95–97	P2

==== 3rd place match ====
Date	Time		Score		Set 1	Set 2	Set 3	Set 4	Set 5	Total	Report
5 May	16:30	Hisamitsu Springs (Japan)	3–1	(Kazakhstan) Altay VC	28–30	25–21	25–19	25–13		103–83	P2

==== Final ====
Date	Time		Score		Set 1	Set 2	Set 3	Set 4	Set 5	Total	Report
5 May	19:00	Tianjin Bohaibank (China)	3–1	(Thailand) Generali Supreme Chonburi-E.Tech	25–18	35–33	16–25	25–19		101–95	P2

== Final standing ==
Rank	Team
1st place, gold medalist(s)	(China) Tianjin Bohaibank
2nd place, silver medalist(s)	(Thailand) Generali Supreme Chonburi-E.Tech
3rd place, bronze medalist(s)	(Japan) Hisamitsu Springs
4	(Kazakhstan) Altay VC
5	(North Korea) April 25 Sports Club
6	Chinese Taipei
7	(Vietnam) VTV Bình Điền Long An
8	Hong Kong
9	Sri Lanka Air Force
10	(Turkmenistan) Binagar

Qualified for the 2019 FIVB Volleyball Women's Club World Championship

2019 Asian Women's Club Champions
(China)
Tianjin Bohaibank
5th title

Team roster
Li Yingying, Liu Xiaotong, Yuan Yumo, Wang Ning, Yang Yi, Aleksandra Crncevic, Liu Liwen, Gong Xiangyu, Meng Zixuan, Wang Yuanyuan, Yao Di (c), Li Yanan, Wang Yizhu
Head coach
Chen Youquan

== Awards ==
- Most Valuable Player

(China) Li Yingying (Tianjin Bohaibank)

- Best Setter

(China) Yao Di (Tianjin Bohaibank)

- Best Outside Spikers

(China) Li Yingying (Tianjin Bohaibank)
(Japan) Hikari Kato (Hisamitsu Springs)

- Best Middle Blockers

(China) Li Yanan (Tianjin Bohaibank)
(China) Wang Yuanyuan (Tianjin Bohaibank)

- Best Opposite Spiker

(Thailand) Ajcharaporn Kongyot (Generali Supreme Chonburi-E.Tech)

- Best Libero

(Japan) Sayaka Tsutsui (Hisamitsu Springs)
