= Zhang Zhejia =

Chinese volleyball player (born 1995)

Personal information
- Nationality: Chinese
- Born: 31 August 1995 (age 31) Ningbo, Zhejiang
- Home town: Shanghai
- Height: 207 cm (6 ft 9 in)
- Weight: 84 kg (185 lb)
- Spike: 357 cm (141 in)
- Block: 345 cm (136 in)

Volleyball information
- Position: Middle blocker / opposite Hitter
- Current club: Shanghai Volleyball Club
- Number: 12

Career
- Years: Team
- 2013 - present: Shanghai Volleyball Club

National team
- Years: Team
- 2011 - 2013 2014 - 2015 2015, 2019 - present: China U19; China U21; China
Honours
Representing China
Asian Championship
Bronze medal – third place	2015 Tehran	Team
Asian Cup
Gold medal – first place	2022 Nakhon Pathom	Team
U21 World Championship
Bronze medal – third place	2015 Mexico
U19 World Championship
Silver medal – second place	2013 Mexico

Zhang Zhejia (born 31 August 1995) is a Chinese male volleyball player. He is part of the China men's national volleyball team. On club level he plays for Shanghai.

== Awards ==
=== Clubs ===
- 2013 National Games of China - Runner-Up, with Shanghai Junior
- 2013–2014 Chinese Volleyball League - Runner-Up, with Shanghai
- 2014–2015 Chinese Volleyball League - Champion, with Shanghai
- 2015–2016 Chinese Volleyball League - Champion, with Shanghai
- 2016–2017 Chinese Volleyball League - Champion, with Shanghai
- 2017–2018 Chinese Volleyball League - Champion, with Shanghai
- 2018–2019 Chinese Volleyball League - Champion, with Shanghai

=== Individuals ===
- 2013 FIVB Volleyball Boys' U19 World Championship "Best middle blocker"
- 2015 Asian Men's Volleyball Championship "Best middle blocker"
- 2015 FIVB Volleyball Men's U21 World Championship "Best middle blocker"

Awards
Preceded by (Qatar) Mohamed Ibrahim and (Iran) Rahman Taghizadeh	Best Middle Blockers of Asian Volleyball Cup; 2022 (with (China) Peng Shikun)	Succeeded by TBD
