= Giulio Sabbi =

Italian volleyball player (born 1989)

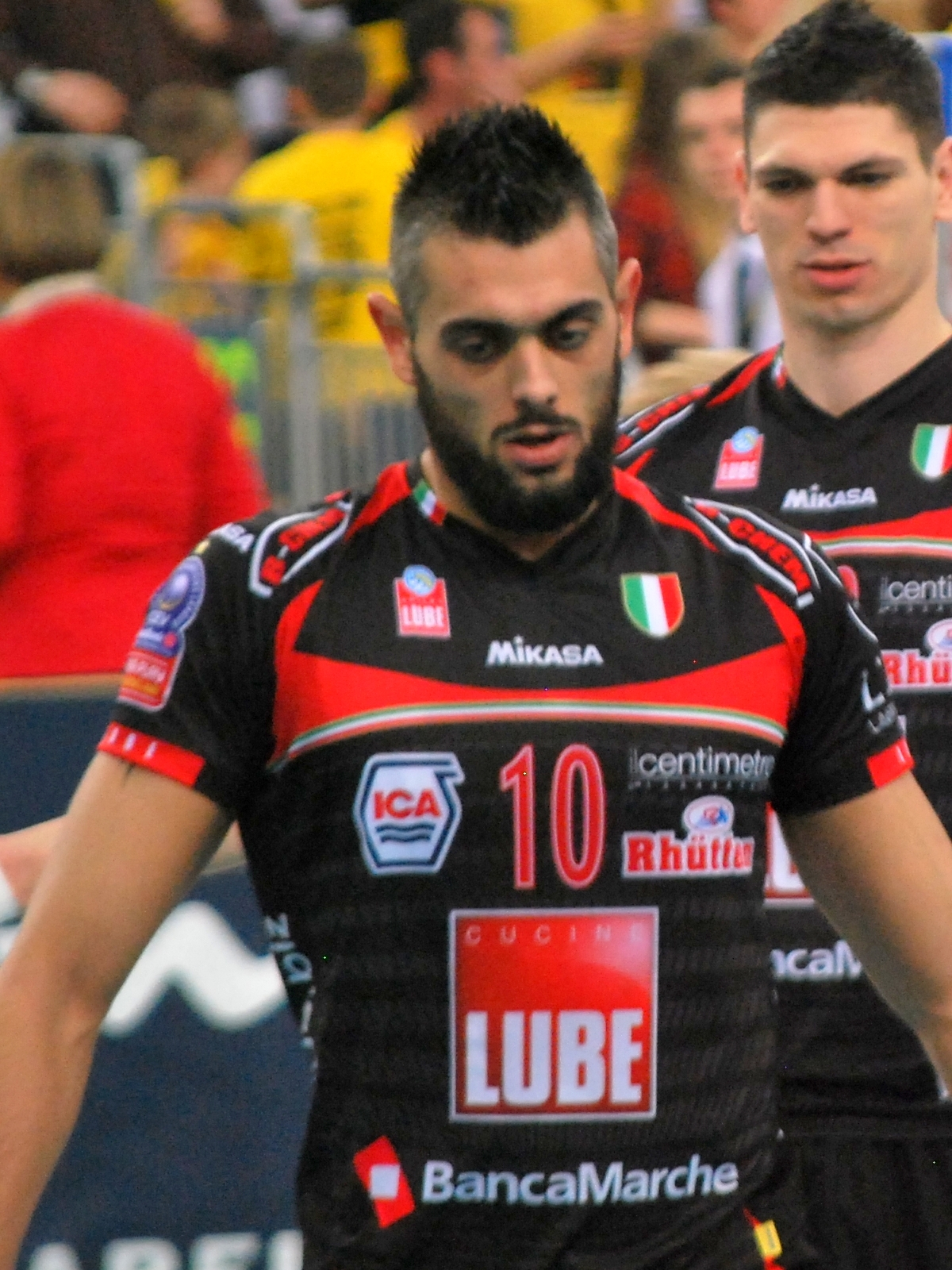

Personal information
- Nationality: Italian
- Born: 10 August 1989 (age 37); Zagarolo, Italy
- Height: 2.01 m (6 ft 7 in)
- Weight: 95 kg (209 lb)
- Spike: 344 cm (135 in)
- Block: 314 cm (124 in)

Volleyball information
- Position: Opposite
- Current club: Shanghai Golden Age
- Number: 10

Career
Years	Teams
2008–2010; 2010–2011; 2011–2012; 2012–2013; 2013–2014; 2014–2015; 2015–2016; 2016; 2016–2017; 2017–2018; 2018–2019; 2019; 2019–2020; 2020–2021; 2021–2022; 2022–	Sisley Treviso; Fenice Isernia; M. Roma Volley; New Mater Volley; Pallavolo Molfetta; Lube Banca Macerata; Fudan University Shanghai; Tours VB; Exprivia Molfetta; Azimut Modena; Shanghai Golden Age; You Energy Volley; Shanghai Golden Age; Top Volley Latina; Prisma Taranto; Shanghai Golden Age

National team
2011–	Italy
Honours
Representing Italy
Men's volleyball
World Cup
Silver medal – second place	2015 Japan
World Grand Champions Cup
Silver medal – second place	2017 Japan
Bronze medal – third place	2013 Japan
World League
Bronze medal – third place	2013 Mar del Plata
European Championship
Silver medal – second place	2011 Austria/Czech Republic
Bronze medal – third place	2015 Bulgaria/Italy
- Last updated: 17 September 2017

Giulio Sabbi (born 10 August 1989) is an Italian volleyball player, a former member of the Italy men's national volleyball team, silver medalist of the 2015 World Cup, medalist of the European Championship (silver in 2011, bronze in 2015), medalist of the World League and World Grand Champions Cup.
