= Yao Di (volleyball) =

Chinese volleyball player (born 1992)

Yao Di (姚迪)
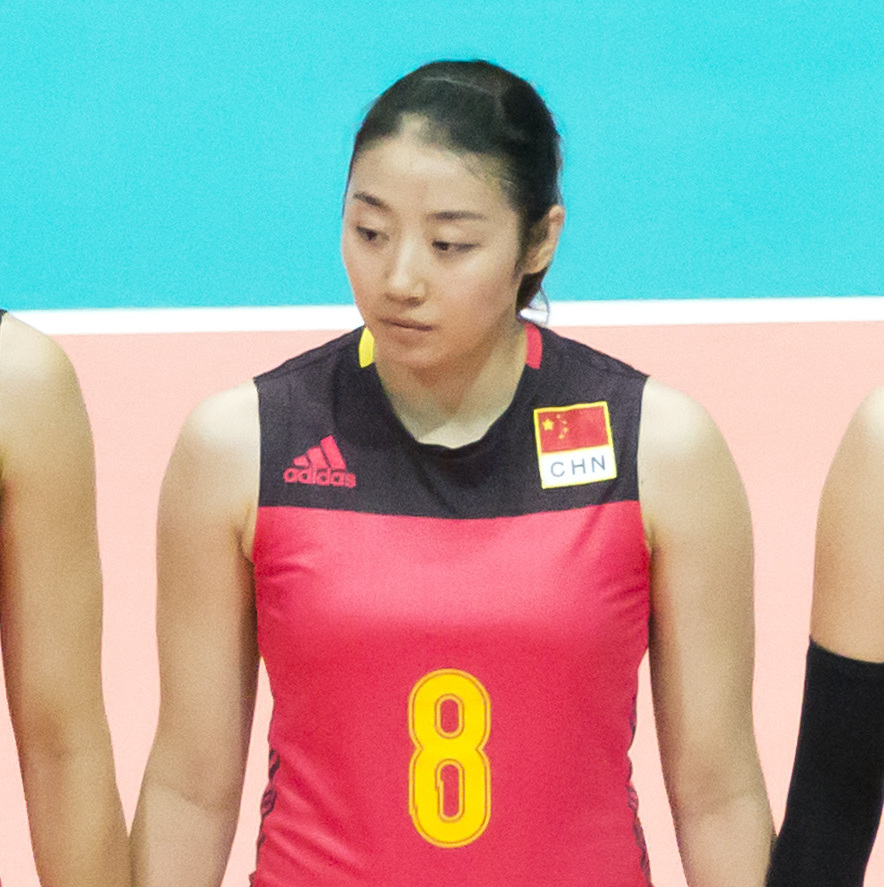
- in the China team for Volleyball

Personal information
- Full name: Yao Di
- Nationality: Chinese
- Born: 15 August 1992 (age 34) Tianjin, China
- Home town: Tianjin, China
- Height: 1.82 m (5 ft 11 1/2 in)
- Weight: 65 kg (143 lb)
- Spike: 306 cm (120 in)
- Block: 298 cm (117 in)

Volleyball information
- Position: Setter
- Current club: (Italy) Imoco Volley Conegliano
- Number: 12

Career
- Years: Team
- 2011 - 2025: Tianjin Bohai Bank
- 2022 - 2023: Savino del Bene Scandicci
- 2026-: (Italy) Imoco Volley Conegliano

National team
- Years: Team
- 2013 - 2021: China
Honours
Representing China
World Championship
Bronze medal – third place	2018 Japan	Team
FIVB World Cup
Gold medal – first place	2019 Japan	Team
World Grand Champions Cup
Gold medal – first place	2017 Japan	Team
Nations League
Bronze medal – third place	2019 Nanjing	Team
Asian Games
Gold medal – first place	2018 Jakarta-Palembang
Silver medal – second place	2014 Incheon
Montreux Volley Masters
Bronze medal – third place	2017 Switzerland	Team
- Updated on June 2024

Yao Di (姚迪; born 15 August 1992, in Tianjin), is a Chinese volleyball player. She was the setter of China women's national volleyball team. Currently she plays for Tianjin Bohai Bank.

== Career ==
Yao won the 2013 FIVB U23 World Championship and was named Most Valuable Player and best setter. She participated in the 2015 FIVB World Grand Prix and 2019 Montreux Volley Masters.

== Clubs ==
- (China) Tianjin (2011 - )
- (Italy) Savino del Bene Scandicci (2022 - 2023)

== Awards ==
=== Individuals ===
- 2011 U20 World Championship "Best Setter"
- 2011 Asian Women's Club Volleyball Championship "Best Setter"
- 2012 Asian Women's Club Volleyball Championship "Best Setter"
- 2013 U23 World Championship "Most Valuable Player"
- 2013 U23 World Championship "Best Setter"
- 2015–16 Chinese Women's Volleyball Super League "Best Setter"
- 2017 Asian Women's Club Volleyball Championship "Best Setter"
- 2017–18 Chinese Women's Volleyball Super League "Best Setter"
- 2019 Asian Women's Club Volleyball Championship "Best Setter"
- 2019-20 Chinese Women's Volleyball Super League "Best Setter"
- 2021–22 Chinese Women's Volleyball Super League "Best Setter"
- 2022–23 Chinese Women's Volleyball Super League "Best Setter"
