= Jiangsu women's volleyball team =

Chinese volleyball team

Jiangsu Zenith Steel Women's Volleyball Club
- Full name: Jiangsu Zenith Steel Women's Volleyball Club 江蘇中天鋼鐵排球俱樂部
- Short name: Jiangsu Women's Volleyball 江蘇女排
- Nickname: Jiangsu Zenith Steel
- Founded: 1958
- Ground: Changzhou University Gymnasium, Changzhou, Jiangsu, China (Capacity: 5,000)
- Manager: (China) Cai Bin
- Captain: Gong Xiangyu
- League: Chinese Volleyball League (CVL)
- 2024-25: Champions

Uniforms
Home	Away

Jiangsu Zenith Steel Women's Volleyball Club is a Nanjing-based professional women's volleyball team plays in the Chinese Volleyball League (CVL), and now is sponsored by Zenith Steel Group.

As the provincial team it represents Jiangsu at national competitions. The team has won the Chinese League champions twice, at Seasons 2016/17 and 2024/25.

== CVL results by Season ==
Season	Final ranking
2025-2026	Runners-up
2024-2025	Champions
2023-2024	Third place
2022-2023	6th
2021-2022	Runners-up
2020-2021	Runners-up
2019-2020	5th
2018-2019	4th
2017-2018	Third place
2016-2017	Champions
2015-2016	Runners-up
2014-2015	Third place
2013-2014	12th
2012-2013	8th
2011-2012	5th
2010-2011	6th
2009-2010	4th
2008-2009	Third place
2007-2008	6th
2006-2007	Third place
2005-2006	8th
2004-2005	4th
2003-2004	5th
2002-2003	9th
2001-2002	9th
2000-2001	4th
1999-2000	Runners-up
1998-1999	5th
1997-1998	Runners-up
1996-1997	Runners-up

== National Games of China results ==
Games	Year	Final ranking
XV	2025	Champions
XIV	2021	Runners-up
XIII	2017	Champions
XII	2013	4th
XI	2009	4th
X	2005	4th
IX	2001	7th
VIII	1997	3rd
VII	1993	4th
VI	1987	Disqualified
V	1983	9th
IV	1979	Runners-up
III	1975	5th
II	1965	9th
I	1959	12th

== Team roster ==
Season 2024–2025

2024–2025 Team
Number	Player	Position	Height (m)	Birth date
1	(China) Fan Poning	Opposite	1.92	2006/07/15
2	(China) Zhang Changning	Outside Hitter	1.95	1995/11/6
4	(China) Song Jiayi	Setter	1.72	2002/04/24
5	(China) Zhou Yetong	Opposite	1.86	2002/05/04
6	(China) Diao Linyu	Setter	1.83	1994/03/29
8	(China) Wu Mengjie	Outside Hitter	1.89	2002/09/10
9	(China) Wan Ziyue	Middle Blocker	1.96	2004/12/19
11	(China) Chen Yifan	Libero	1.76	2002/01/25
12	(China) Wu Han	Outside Hitter	1.80	1998/04/23
13	(China) Yang Jia	Middle Blocker	1.88	2005/11/12
14	(China) Tang Xin	Outside Hitter	1.84	2004/05/21
15	(China) Sun Yan	Setter	1.87	2001/07/06
16	(China) Gong Xiangyu (C)	Opposite	1.87	1997/04/21
18	(China) Ni Feifan	Libero	1.77	2001/02/14
19	(China) Zhang Yiwen	Middle Blocker	1.91	2000/06/06

== Honours ==
=== International competitions ===
==== AVC Champions League ====
Third Place (1): 2018

=== Domestic competitions ===
==== Chinese Volleyball Super League ====
Champions (1): 2024–25
Runners-up (2): 2020–21, 2021–22
Third Place (2): 2017–18, 2023–24

==== Chinese Volleyball League ====
Champions (1): 2016–17
Runners-up (4): 1996–97, 1997–98, 1999–2000, 2015–16
Third Place (3): 2006–07, 2008–09, 2014–15

== Sponsorship ==
Season	Sponsor
2014-	Zenith Steel Group
2014-	City of Changzhou
2011-2014	County of Guanyun
2007-2013	East China Mineral Exploration & Development Bureau
1996-2009	Southeast University
1996-2007	Yizheng Chemical Fibre

== Retired players ==
- (China) Chen Yayun
- (China) Lu Qian
- (China) Mao Junan
- (China) Qiu Aihua
- (China) Ren Jing
- (China) Sun Jinfang, Captain of the Chinese national team (1977-1982).
- (China) Sun Yue, Olympic silver medalist, Captain of the Chinese national team (1999-2000).
- (China) Wang Zunyi
- (China) Xue Xiaoya
- (China) Zhang Zhongyu
- (China) Zhao Yun
- (China) Li Hui
- (China) Zhai Tingli
- (China) Wang Wei
- (China) Wang Xueting
- (China) Meng Xinghan
- (China) Hui Ruoqi, Captain of the Chinese national team (2013-2016).
