= Qingdao University Gymnasium =

Sports venue in Qingdao, China

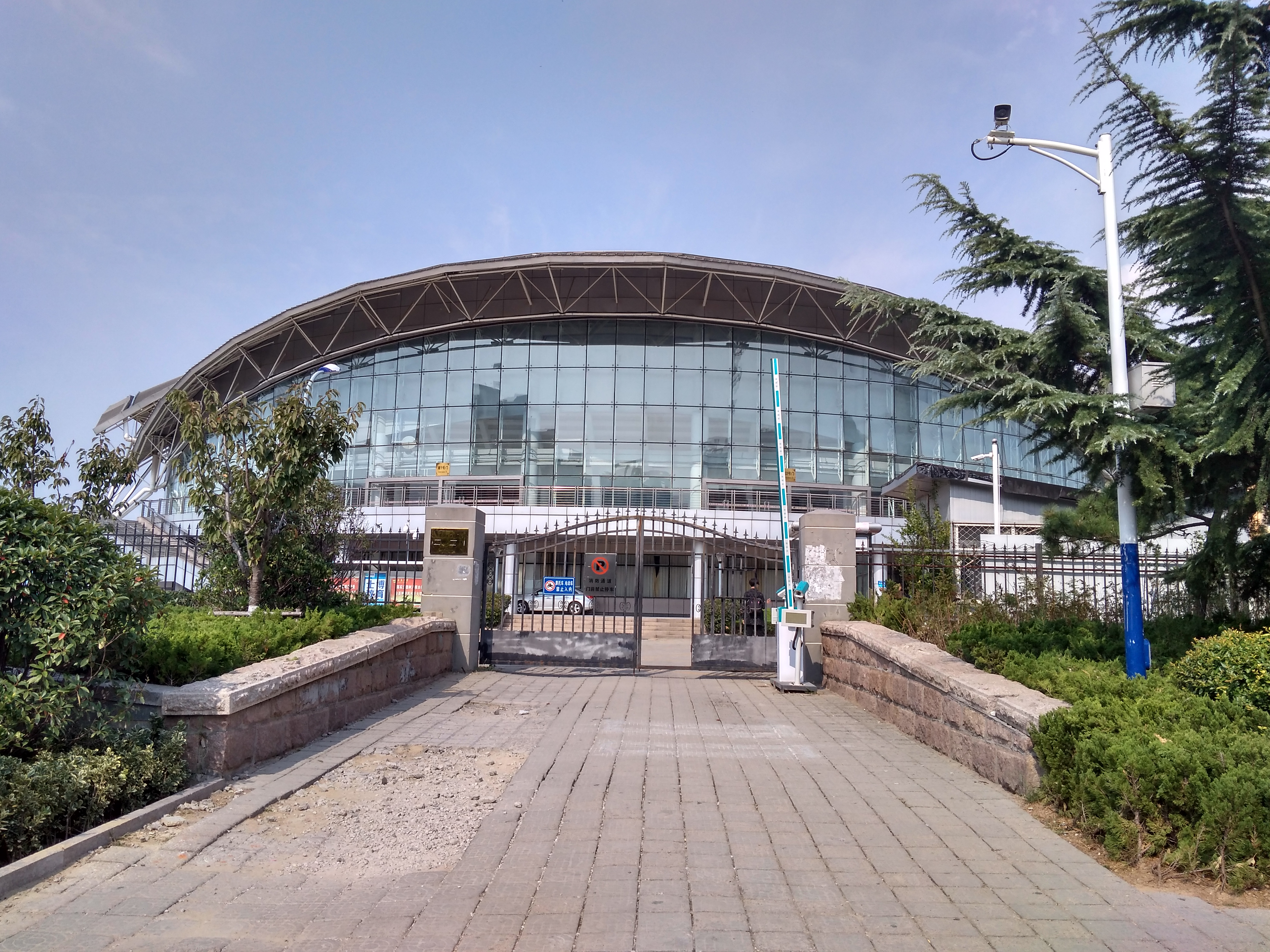
- Full name: Qingdao University Gymnasium
- Location: Qingdao, China
- Capacity: 6,000

Construction
- Opened: 2005

Tenant
- Qingdao DoubleStar (CBA)

Qingdao University Gymnasium is an indoor sporting arena located in Qingdao, China. The capacity of the arena is 6,000 spectators. It opened in 2005. It hosts indoor sporting events such as basketball and volleyball. It hosts the Qingdao DoubleStar of the Chinese Basketball Association.

== See also ==
- Sports in China
