= List of Chinese volleyball players =

This is a list of Chinese volleyball players

== Men ==
- Jin Zhang

== Women ==
- Chu Jinling
- Hu Ying
- Jin Hong
- Jin Xin
- Liu Shu
- Liu Tingting
- Liu Yanan
- Qi Jianhua
- Tu Yuance
- Wang Lina
- Wang Yimei
- Yang Hao
- Ye Xiaoyu
- Zhao Ruirui
- Zhao Yanni
- Zhang Ping
- Zhang Yuehong
- Zhou Jia
