= Deqing =

Deqing may refer to the following locations in China:

- Deqing County, Guangdong (德庆县)
- Deqing County, Zhejiang (德清县)
- Dêqên Town, or Deqing (德庆), Tibet

Deqing may also refer to:

- the Ming Dynasty Buddhist monk Hanshan Deqing (憨山德清)

== See also ==
- Dêqên Tibetan Autonomous Prefecture, Yunnan
- Dêqên County, Yunnan
