= Hui Ruoqi =

Chinese volleyball player

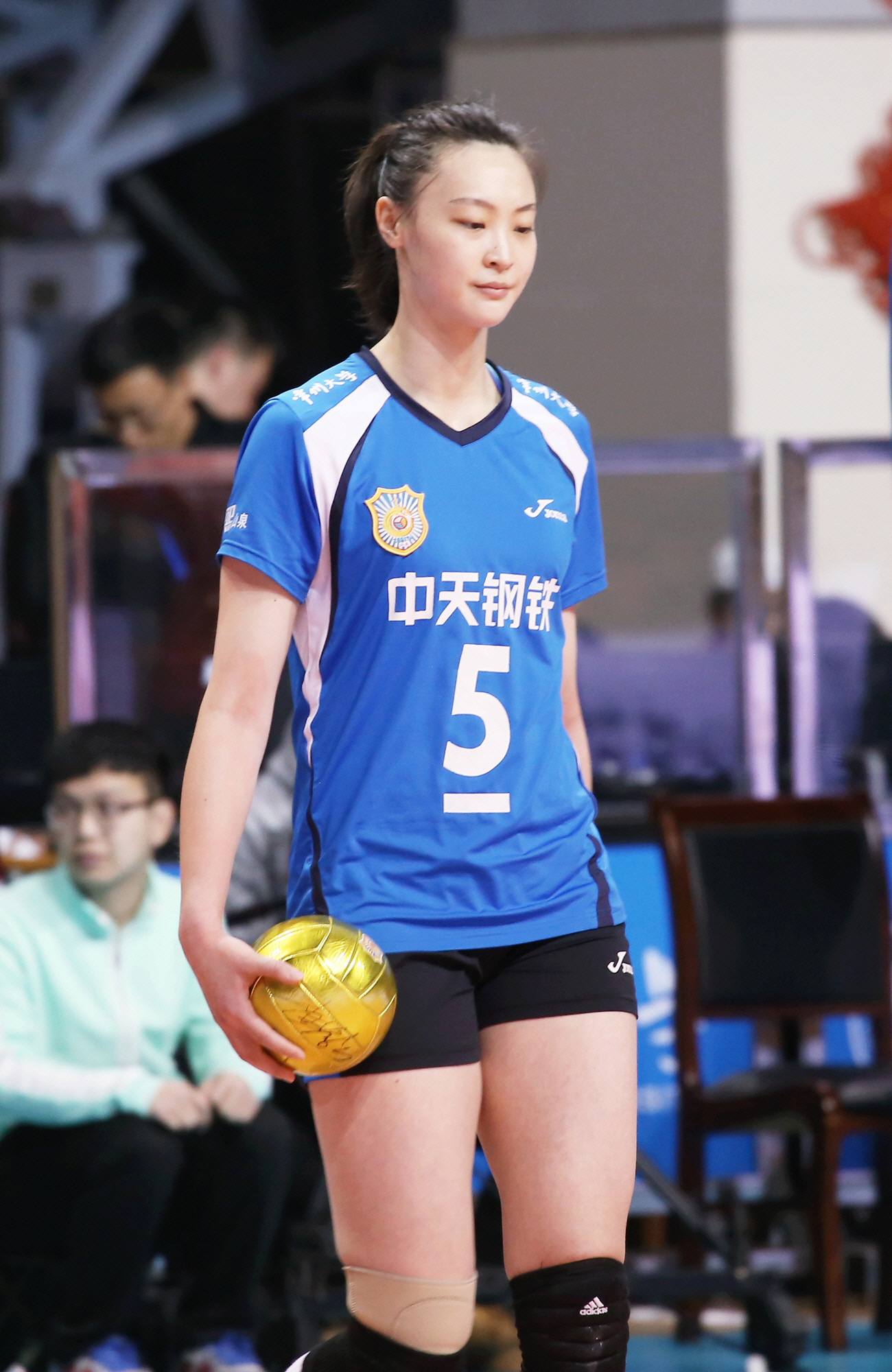
- Hui in 2017

Personal information
- Nationality: Chinese
- Born: 惠若琪; 4 March 1991 (age 35); Dalian, Liaoning, China
- Height: 192 cm (6 ft 3 1/2 in)
- Weight: 78 kg (172 lb)
- Spike: 315 cm (124 in)
- Block: 305 cm (120 in)

Volleyball information
- Position: Outside hitter
- Current club: retired

Career
Years	Teams
2006–2013; 2013–2014; 2014–2017	Jiangsu; Guangdong Evergrande; Jiangsu

National team
2007–2016	China
Honours
Volleyball
Olympic Games
Gold medal – first place	2016 Rio de Janeiro	Team
World Championship
Silver medal – second place	2014 Italy
World Cup
Bronze medal – third place	2011 Japan
Asian Championship
Gold medal – first place	2015 Tianjin
Gold medal – first place	2011 Taipei
Silver medal – second place	2009 Hanoi

Hui Ruoqi (Chinese: 惠若琪; born 4 March 1991) is a Chinese former volleyball player. She was an outside hitter and the fifteenth captain of China women's national volleyball team, and played for Jiangsu. She retired in 2018.

== Early and personal life ==
Hui was born in Dalian. Her parents are Hui Fei (惠飞) and Xu Xueyuan (许雪媛). She has a sister Hui Ruoxuan (惠若璇) who is ten years her junior. Both of her parents were keen volleyball players when they were young.

When Hui was nine, her family moved and settled in Nanjing.

Hui is an alumnus of Nanjing No.29 Middle School and received her master's degree in physical education from Nanjing Normal University in 2017. She then worked on her PhD at the same university.

In 2018, Hui married Yang Zhenbo. The two welcomed a daughter in 2022.

== Career ==
Hui started playing volleyball in elementary school in Nanjing. In 2006, she was chosen for the Jiangsu professional team. In 2007, she was selected for the national team. She was part of the Chinese national team that won gold at the 2016 Summer Olympics.

== Endorsement ==
Since 2017, Hui has been a spokeswoman for Adidas.

== Awards ==
=== Individuals ===
- 2012 Asian Women's Cup Volleyball Championship "Best server"

=== Clubs ===
- 2013 Club World Championship - Bronze medal, with Guangdong Evergrande

== See also ==
- China at the 2012 Summer Olympics#Volleyball
- Volleyball at the 2012 Summer Olympics – Women's tournament

Awards
Preceded by (Japan) Yuki Ishii	Most Valuable Player of Montreux Volley Masters; 2016	Succeeded by (Brazil) Ana Carolina da Silva
Preceded by (Japan) Yuki Ishii and (Netherlands) Anne Buijs	Best Outside Spiker of Montreux Volley Masters; 2016 (with (Thailand) Ajcharaporn Kongyot)	Succeeded by (Brazil) Natália Pereira and (Argentina) Yamila Nizetich
