= Beijing BAIC Motor men's volleyball team =

Chinese men's volleyball club based in Beijing

Beijing BAIC Motor Men’s Volleyball Club
- Full name: Beijing BAIC Motor Men’s Volleyball Club 北京汽車男子排球俱乐部
- Nickname: Beijing BAW 北京汽車男排
- Founded: 2010
- Ground: Guangcai Stadium, Beijing, China (Capacity: 2800)
- Manager: (China) Liu Xudong
- League: Chinese Volleyball Men's League
- 2020–21: 1st

Uniforms
Home	Away

Beijing BAIC Motor Men’s Volleyball Club (Chinese: 北京汽車男排), is a Chinese men’s volleyball club based in Beijing, founded in 1950s and changed to a professional club in 2010. It is established by Beijing Municipal Sports Bureau and BAIC Group on September 14, 2010. The team currently plays in the Chinese Men's League. They won the local league championship three times.

== 2019–20 team roster ==
#	Player	Position	Height	Birth date
1	(France) Kévin Le Roux	Spiker	2.09 m (6 ft 10 in)	11 May 1989
2	(Cuba) Leonardo Leyva	Spiker	2.06 m (6 ft 9 in)	23 March 1990
3	(China) Hu Xizhao	Middle Blocker	1.99 m (6 ft 6 in)	25 February 1993
4	(China) Wang Dongchen	Middle Blocker	2.00 m (6 ft 7 in)	1 June 2000
5	(China) Zhang Binglong	Spiker	1.98 m (6 ft 6 in)	11 September 1994
6	(China) Zhang Jiyang	Spiker	1.97 m (6 ft 6 in)	12 December 2000
7	(Iran) Saeid Marouf	Setter	1.92 m (6 ft 4 in)	20 October 1985
8	(China) Kang Kang	Setter	1.98 m (6 ft 6 in)	21 November 1984
9	(China) Yang Fan	Middle Blocker	2.00 m (6 ft 7 in)	22 August 1988
10	(China) Gu Jiafeng	Middle Blocker	2.03 m (6 ft 8 in)	27 September 1996
11	(China) Jiang Chuan	Opposite	2.03 m (6 ft 8 in)	9 August 1994
12	(China) Wang Chen	Opposite	1.96 m (6 ft 5 in)	16 November 1987
13	(China) Han Huangguang	Libero	1.78 m (5 ft 10 in)	15 January 1996
14	(China) Deng Xinpeng	Spiker	2.00 m (6 ft 7 in)	10 April 2001
15	(China) Chu Hui	Libero	1.88 m (6 ft 2 in)	11 February 1981
16	(China) Shan Qingtao	Libero	1.94 m (6 ft 4 in)	16 January 1986
17	(China) Liu Libin	Spiker	1.97 m (6 ft 6 in)	16 February 1995
18	(China) Lin Zhekai	Spiker	2.00 m (6 ft 7 in)	13 August 2000
19	(China) Liu Ze	Setter	1.95 m (6 ft 5 in)	21 April 1998
20	(China) Liu Hao	Spiker	2.08 m (6 ft 10 in)	11 April 1997

== Honours ==
- Chinese Volleyball League

Champions (4): 2012-13, 2013-14, 2020-21, 2022-23
Runners-up (4): 2015-16, 2016-17, 2017-18, 2018-19
Third Place (1): 2014-15

- AVC Club Volleyball Championship

Third place (1): 2014

== Notable players ==
=== Foreigners ===
- (Cuba) (Germany) Salvador Hidalgo Oliva (2012 – 2013)
- (Canada) Steven Brinkman (2012 – 2013)
- (Canada) Fred Winters (2012 – 2014)
- (Belgium) (Italy) Wout Wijsmans (2013 – 2014)
- (United States) William Price (2014 – 2015)
- (Bosnia and Herzegovina) Armin Mustedanović (2014 – 2015)
- (Serbia) Nemanja Jakovljević (2015, in place of injured Armin Mustedanović)
- (Australia) Thomas Edgar (2015 – 2016)
- (Cuba) Leonel Marshall Jr. (2015 – 2016)
- (United States) Taylor Sander (2016 – 2017)
- (Cuba) Oreol Camejo (2016 – 2017)
- (Canada) John Gordon Perrin (2017 – 2018)
- (France) Kévin Tillie (2017 – 2019)
- (Poland) Michał Kubiak (2018, only for Finals)
- (Cuba) Leonardo Leyva (2018 – 2020)
- (Iran) Saeid Marouf (2019 – 2021)
- (France) Kévin Le Roux (2019 – 2020)
- (United States) Maxwell Holt (2022 – 2024)
- (United States) Thomas Jaeschke (2022 – present)
- (Cuba) Yosvany Hernandez (2022 – present)

=== Local ===
- (China) Hu Song (2001 - 2013)
- (China) Wang Chen (2009 - 2014, 2015–present)
- (China) Chu Hui (2012 - 2018)
- (China) Liu Libin (2013 - 2017, 2019–present)
- (China) Zhang Binglong (2013 - 2016, 2018–present)
- (China) Jiang Chuan (2014–present)

== See also ==
- Beijing BAIC Motor women's volleyball team
- Chinese Volleyball Super League
  - Shanghai Men's Volleyball Club
