= Gong Xiangyu =

Chinese volleyball player (born 1997)

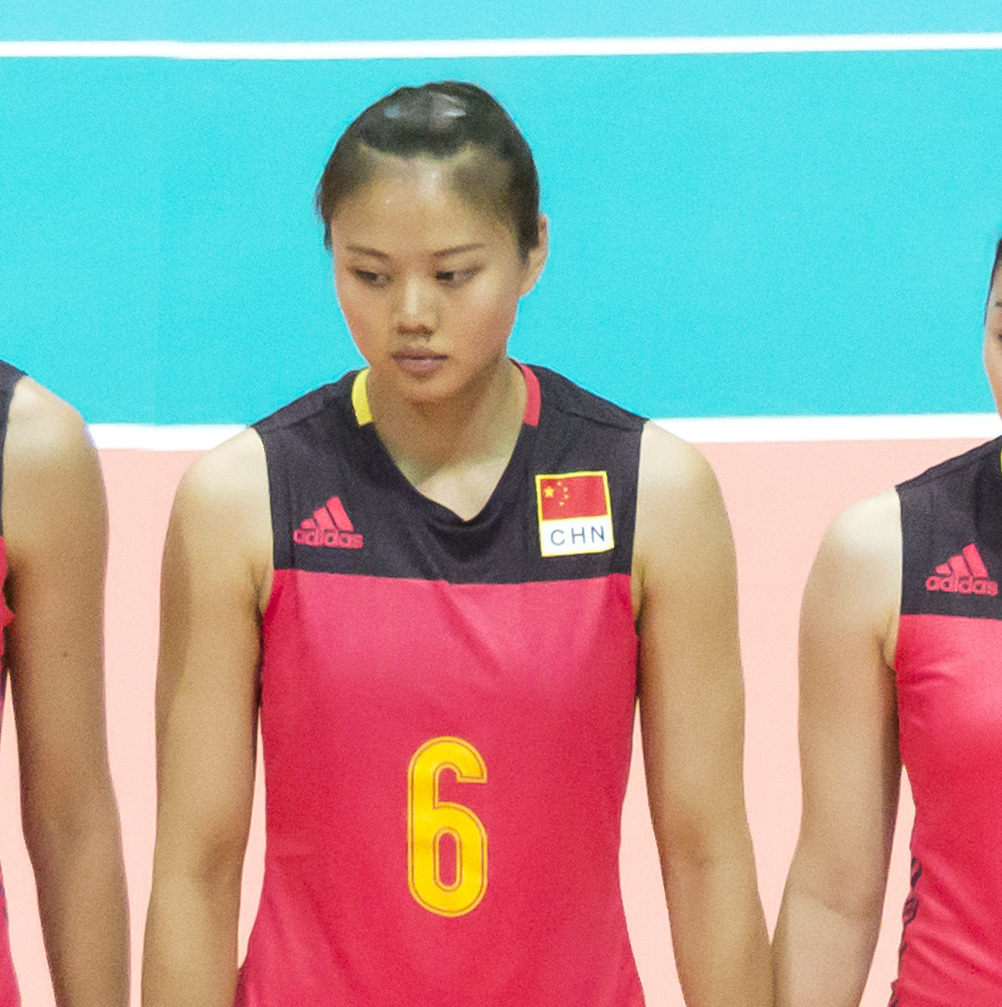
- Gong in 2017

Personal information
- Nickname: Little Universe (小宇宙)
- Nationality: Chinese
- Born: 21 April 1997 (age 29) Lianyungang, Jiangsu, China
- Home town: Lianyungang, Jiangsu, China
- Height: 1.88 m (6 ft 2 in)
- Weight: 67 kg (148 lb)
- Spike: 320 cm (126 in)
- Block: 315 cm (124 in)

Volleyball information
- Position: Opposite hitter (2014–present); Setter (before 2014)
- Current club: (United States) LOVB Madison
- Number: 16/14/6

Career
- Years: Team
- 2015–2025: (China) Jiangsu
- 2025–2026: (United States) LOVB Madison
- 2026–: (Japan) Kurobe AquaFairies Toyama

National team
- Years: Team
- 2016–: China
Honours
Volleyball
Olympic Games
Gold medal – first place	2016 Rio de Janeiro	Team
World Championship
Bronze medal – third place	2018 Japan	Team
FIVB World Cup
Gold medal – first place	2019 Japan	Team
World Grand Champions Cup
Gold medal – first place	2017 Japan	Team
Volleyball Nations League
Silver medal – second place	2023 Arlington	Team
Bronze medal – third place	2018 Nanjing	Team
Bronze medal – third place	2019 Nanjing	Team
Asian Games
Gold medal – first place	2018 Jakarta-Palembang
Gold medal – first place	2022 Hangzhou	Team
Gold medal – first place	2026 Aichi/Nagoya	Team
AVC Continental Championship
Silver medal – second place	2026 Tianjin	Team
AVC Cup
Gold medal – first place	2016 Vinh Phuc
Montreux Volley Masters
Gold medal – first place	2016 Switzerland
Bronze medal – third place	2017 Switzerland	Team

Gong Xiangyu (simplified Chinese: 龚翔宇; traditional Chinese: 龔翔宇; pinyin: gōng xiáng yǔ; born 21 April 1997) is a Chinese volleyball player. She is the captain of the China women's national volleyball team. On the club level, she plays for LOVB Madison.

== Personal ==
She was born in Lianyungang to a P.E. teacher mother who was once a national épée champion, and a policeman father who used to play for the Jiangsu U23 basketball team. Her given name Xiangyu means "flying in the universe." She started attending Nanjing Normal University in 2016.

== Career ==
=== Junior ===
Before 2014, she was a setter. As a substitute player, she participated in 2012 Asian Youth Girls Volleyball Championship and 2013 FIVB Volleyball Girls' U18 World Championship.

In 2014, because the former main opposite hitter, Ju Wanrong's injury, she began to be an opposite hitter and had success. During 2014 Asian Junior Women's Volleyball Championship and 2015 FIVB Volleyball Women's U20 World Championship, she showed her power.

=== Senior ===
She was promoted by Coach Cai Bin from the Jiangsu U23 team to Jiangsu Women's Volleyball Club in the 2015–2016 season. Following a successful debut season at the Chinese Volleyball League, she was selected by Coach Lang Ping for the national team in 2016. She represented China at the 2016 Summer Olympics and won the gold medal. She participated at the 2016 Montreux Volley Masters, 2017 Montreux Volley Masters, 2018 Montreux Volley Masters, and 2019 Montreux Volley Masters.

== Awards ==
=== National team ===
- 2016 Olympic Games - Gold medal
- 2017 World Grand Champions Cup - Gold medal
- 2018 FIVB Volleyball Women's Nations League： - Bronze medal
- 2018 Asian Games： - Gold medal
- 2018 FIVB Volleyball Women's World Championship: - Bronze medal
- 2019 FIVB Volleyball Women's World Cup： - Gold medal
- 2023 FIVB Volleyball Women's Nations League： - Silver medal
- 2022 Asian Games： - Gold medal

Awards
Preceded by (Netherlands) Lonneke Slöetjes	Best Opposite Spiker of Montreux Volley Masters; 2016; 2017	Succeeded by TBD
