= Shanghai Men's Volleyball Club =

Chinese volleyball club

Shanghai Bright Men's Volleyball Club
- Full name: Shanghai Bright Volleyball Club 上海光明男子排球俱乐部
- Nickname: Shanghai Bright 上海男排
- Founded: 1996 (change the format to run as a sports club)
- Ground: Luwan Sports Centre, Shanghai, China (Capacity: 3500)
- Manager: (China) Shen Qiong (2014–present)
- League: Chinese Volleyball Men's League
- 2024–25: Champions

Uniforms
Home	Away

Shanghai Men's Volleyball Club, now known as Shanghai Bright (Chinese: 上海光明男排), is a Chinese men's volleyball club based in Shanghai. The Shanghai men's volleyball team plays in the Chinese Men's League and the AVC Club Volleyball Championship.

The team won 18 Chinese League champion titles. The team with the name and different extensions have been presented as Shanghai Tang Dynasty, Fudan University Shanghai, Shanghai Golden Age and now Shanghai Bright.

The team participated in FIVB Volleyball Men's Club World Championship for the first time in 2017.

== Team roster ==
Season 2024–2025

2024–2025 Team
Number	Player	Position	Height (m)	Birth date
1	(China) Dai Qingyao	Opposite/Outside Hitter	2.05	1991/09/26
2	(China) Sun Zeyuan	Opposite	1.94	1998/07/16
3	(China) Xiu Chengcheng	Opposite	2.00	1999/08/23
4	(China) Tian Cong	Outside Hitter	1.93	1999/10/16
5	(China) Liu Jiajun	Middle Blocker	1.98	1998/12/05
6	(China) Bian Shijie	Middle Blocker	1.99	2000/12/16
7	(China) Fu Houwen	Outside Hitter	1.95	1996/05/17
8	(China) Yang Tianyuan	Libero	1.80	1994/06/28
9	(China) Guo Cheng	Setter	2.00	1995/11/12
10	(China) Wu Pengzhi	Opposite	2.00	1996/03/02
11	(United States) Maxwell Holt	Middle Blocker	2.08	1987/03/12
12	(China) Zhang Zhejia	Middle Blocker	2.11	1995/08/31
13	(Poland) Michał Kubiak	Outside Hitter	1.92	1988/02/23
14	(Hungary) Krisztián Pádár	Opposite	1.99	1996/11/14
16	(China) Qu Zongshuai	Libero	1.86	1999/01/20
17	(China) Lu Tiancheng	Middle Blocker	2.00	2003/01/24
18	(China) Zhu Jiang	Setter	1.93	2002/04/22

== Honours ==
- Chinese Volleyball League

Champions (18): 1999/00, 2003/04 – 2011/12, 2014/15 – 2019/20, 2023/24, 2024/25
Runners-up (4): 2002/03, 2013/14, 2020/21, 2022/23

- AVC Club Volleyball Championship

Runners-up (1): 2012
Third place (3): 2001, 2005, 2011

== Notable players ==
- (China) Shen Qiong (1999–2013)
- (China) Fang Yingchao (2001–2017)
- (China) Ren Qi (2005–present)
- (United States) David Lee (2013–2014)
- (Serbia) Bojan Janić (2013–2014)
- (Italy) Cristian Savani (2013–2016)
- (Serbia) Nikola Kovačević (2014–2015, 2016 (only for Asian Club Championship))
- (United States) Scott Touzinsky (2015–2016)
- (Italy) Giulio Sabbi (2015–2016, 2018–2019)
- (Germany) György Grozer (2016–2017)
- (Argentina) Facundo Conte (2016–2018)
- (France) Julien Lyneel (2017–2018)
- (Hungary) Krisztián Pádár (2017–2018, only for the Finals), (2024–present)
- (Slovenia) Klemen Čebulj (2018–2019)
- (Slovenia) Tine Urnaut (2019–2020)
- (Italy) Osmany Juantorena (2022–2023)
- (Poland) Bartosz Bednorz (2022–2023)
- (Serbia) Aleksandar Atanasijević (2023–2024)
- (Poland) Michał Kubiak (2023–present)
- (Argentina) Maximiliano Cavanna (2023–2024)
- (United States) Maxwell Holt (2024–Present)

== Head coaches ==
Note: The following list may not be complete.

- (China) Shen Fulin (????-2005 and 2009 Chinese National Games)
- (China) Ju Genyin (2005–2010)
- (China) Wang Jian (2010–2012)
- (China) Lyu Ningxin (2012–2014)
- (China) Shen Qiong (2014–)

== See also ==
- Shanghai women's volleyball team
- Chinese Volleyball Super League
  - Beijing BAIC Motor Men's Volleyball Team
