= Lists of volleyball players =

This is a list of lists of volleyball players, and of notable examples in fiction.

== Lists of notable players ==
- List of international volleyball players
- List of American beach volleyball players
- List of Chinese volleyball players
- List of Premier Volleyball League award recipients
- List of Olympic medalists in volleyball
- Premier Volleyball League award recipients
- Spikers' Turf award recipients

== Fictional volleyball players ==
- Shoyo Hinata, protagonist of the manga series Haikyu!!
- Kasumi, protagonist of the video game series Dead or Alive
- Sailor Venus in the manga series Sailor Moon
- You Hazuki, protagonist of the manga and anime series Attacker You!
