= 2022–23 Chinese Men's Volleyball Super League =

Chinese volleyball league

- League: Chinese Men's Volleyball Super League
- Sport: Volleyball
- Duration: 29 October 2022 – 5 January 2023
- Games: 165
- Teams: 14
- Total attendance: 0
- TV partner(s): CCTV-5, Migu Video

Regular round
- Top seed: Shanghai Bright
- Top scorer: (China) Guo Shunxiang (Sichuan)

Finals
- Champions: Beijing BAIC Motor
- Runners-up: Shanghai Bright
- Finals MVP: (China) Liu Ze (Beijing)

Chinese Men's Volleyball Super League seasons
- ← 2020–21 2023–24 →

The 2022–23 Chinese Men's Volleyball Super League (Chinese: 2022–23年中国男子排球超級联赛) is the 27th season of the Chinese Men's Volleyball Super League, the highest professional volleyball league in China. The season began on 29 October 2022 and concluded on 5 January 2023.

The fourteen teams were divided into two groups. However, the Group A teams' matches, which were originally due to be held in Kaifeng, Henan Province from 29 October to 4 November, were postponed due to grave concerns of epidemic and rescheduled to 23–29 November instead. The matches of Group B in Wuyuan, Shangrao, Jiangxi Province pushed through.

Beijing BAIC Motor defended and crowned as back-to-back champions of the season after defeating Shanghai Bright in the best-of-three finals (2–0).

== Club teams ==
=== Personnel ===
2022–23 Chinese Men's Volleyball Super League
| Club | Head coach | Captain | Province/City | Colors | Main Sponsor |
|---|---|---|---|---|---|
| Beijing BAIC Motor | (China) Li Mu | (China) Liu Libin | Beijing | | |
| Shanghai Bright | (China) Shen Qiong | (Italy) Osmany Juantorena | Shanghai | | |
| Nanjing Radio and Television Maomao | (China) Wang Shu | (China) Yu Yuantai | Nanjing | | |
| Zhejiang Sports Lottery | (China) Shen Andong | (China) Chen Leiyang | Huzhou | | |
| Henan | (China) Cui Jianjun | (China) Cui Kerui | Nanyang | | |
| Tianjin Food Group | (China) Liu Hao | (China) Mao Tianyi | Tianjin | | |
| Shandong Ruchen | (China) Zhang Qiong | (China) Liu Meng | Zibo | | |
| Sichuan | (China) Cao Huaye | (China) Jiang Zhiyuan | Chengdu | | |
| Baoding Woli | (China) Liu Guangxin | (China) Sui Xiangyu | Xingtai | | |
| Shenzhen Mingjinhai | (China) Li Wenlin | (China) Wang Haoyan | Shenzhen | | |
| Huangshi Dongchu | (China) Zhou Dan | (China) Wu Xueyang | Xiaogan | | |
| Fujian | (China) Teng Maomin | (China) Wu Zhai | Fuqing | | |
| Liaoning Donghua | (China) Siu Shengsheng | (China) Wang Shaoliu | Shenyang | | |
| Yunnan | (China) Zhou Zhiyuan | (China) Li Ben | Kunming | | |

=== Transfer of players ===
The list of transfer players in the 2022–23 season
| Player | Moving from | Moving to | Ref. |
Chinese players
| (China) Du Haixiang | (China) Sichuan | (China) Tianjin Food Group | |
| (China) Geng Xin | (China) Tianjin Food Group | (Japan) Panasonic Panthers | |
| (China) Ji Daoshuai | (Japan) Suntory Sunbirds | (China) Shandong Ruchen | |
| (China) Jiang Chuan | (China) Beijing BAIC Motor | (Japan) JT Thunders Hiroshima | |
| (China) Qi Qi | (China) Shanghai Bright | (China) Sichuan | |
| (China) Qu Zhongshuai | (China) Bayi Nanchang | (China) Shanghai Bright | |
| (China) Rao Shuhan | (Japan) JTEKT Stings | (China) Shanghai Bright | |
| (China) Tian Cong | (China) Shanghai Bright | (China) Sichuan | |
| (China) Wang Dongchen | (China) Beijing BAIC Motor | (Japan) Wolfdogs Nagoya | |
| (China) Yu Yaochen | (China) Nanjing Radio and Television Maomao | (Japan) Tsukuba United Sun Gaia | |
| (China) Zhai Haonan | (China) Bayi Nanchang | (China) Tianjin Food Group | |
| (China) Zhang Binglong | (China) Beijing BAIC Motor | (Japan) Tokyo Greatbears | |
Foreign players
| (Belarus) Artur Udrys | (Greece) PAOK Thessaloniki | (China) Nanjing Radio and Television Maomao | |
| (Poland) Bartosz Bednorz | (Russia) Zenit Kazan | (China) Shanghai Bright | |
| (Cameroon) Christian Voukeng | (Turkey) Afyon Belediye Yüntaş | (China) Beijing BAIC Motor | |
| (Serbia) Danilo Pavlović | (Slovenia) Calcit Volley | (China) Tianjin Food Group | |
| (Belarus) Dzmitry Vash | (Belarus) Shakhtar Soligorsk | (China) Nanjing Radio and Television Maomao | |
| (Italy) Filippo Lanza | (China) Shanghai Bright | (Poland) PGE Skra Bełchatów | |
| (Italy) Giulio Sabbi | (Italy) Gioiella Prisma Taranto | (China) Shanghai Bright | |
| (Belarus) Kanstantsin Panasenko | (Belarus) Stroitel Mińsk | (China) Baoding Woli | |
| (Italy) Luca Vettori | (China) Shanghai Bright | (France) Narbonne Volley | |
| (Belarus) Maksim Shkredau | (Russia) Yugra-Samotlor Nijnievartovsk | (China) Beijing BAIC Motor | |
| (Russia) Maksim Zhigalov | (Russia) Dynamo LO | (China) Tianjin Food Group | |
| (Italy) Matteo Martino | (China) Shenzhen Mingjinhai | (Italy) ASD Pallavolo La Bollente | |
| (United States) Maxwell Holt | (Italy) Gas Sales Bluenergy Piacenza | (China) Beijing BAIC Motor | |
| (Serbia) Mihajlo Stanković | (Romania) CS Arcada Galați | (China) Nanjing Radio and Television Maomao | |
| (United States) Mitchell Stahl | (Poland) PSG Stal Nysa | (China) Tianjin Food Group | |
| (Italy) Osmany Juantorena | (Italy) Cucine Lube Civitanova | (China) Shanghai Bright | |
| (Cuba) Ricardo Calvo | (Brazil) Vila Nova Volley | (China) Shanghai Bright | |
| (United States) Thomas Jaeschke | (Italy) Allianz Milano | (China) Beijing BAIC Motor | |
| (Ukraine) Tymofii Poluian | (Turkey) Sorgun Belediyespor | (China) Baoding Woli | |
| (Bulgaria) Valentin Bratoev | (China) Tianjin Food Group | (Bulgaria) Deya Volley Burgas | |
| (Cuba) Yosvany Hernandez | (Egypt) Zamalek VC | (China) Beijing BAIC Motor | |
| (Ukraine) Yurii Synytsia | (Russia) Yugra-Samotlor Nijnievartovsk | (China) Baoding Woli | |

=== Foreign players ===
The total number of foreign players per club has no restrictions.

The list of 2022–23 Chinese Men's Volleyball Super League Foreign Players
| Club | Players |
|---|---|
| Beijing BAIC Motor | (Cameroon) Christian Voukeng |
| Beijing BAIC Motor | (Belarus) Maksim Shkredau |
| Beijing BAIC Motor | (United States) Maxwell Holt |
| Beijing BAIC Motor | (United States) Thomas Jaeschke |
| Beijing BAIC Motor | (Cuba) Yosvany Hernandez |
| Shanghai Bright | (Poland) Bartosz Bednorz |
| Shanghai Bright | (Italy) Giulio Sabbi |
| Shanghai Bright | (Italy) Osmany Juantorena |
| Shanghai Bright | (Cuba) Ricardo Calvo |
| Nanjing Radio and Television Maomao | (Belarus) Artur Udrys |
| Nanjing Radio and Television Maomao | (Belarus) Dzmitry Vash |
| Nanjing Radio and Television Maomao | (Serbia) Mihajlo Stanković |
| Zhejiang Sports Lottery | none |
| Henan | none |
| Tianjin Food Group | (Serbia) Danilo Pavlović |
| Tianjin Food Group | (Russia) Maksim Zhigalov |
| Tianjin Food Group | (United States) Mitchell Stahl |
| Shandong Ruchen | none |
| Sichuan | none |
| Baoding Woli | (Belarus) Kanstantsin Panasenko |
| Baoding Woli | (Ukraine) Tymofii Poluian |
| Baoding Woli | (Ukraine) Yurii Synytsia |
| Shenzhen Mingjinhai | none |
| Huangshi Dongchu | none |
| Fujian | none |
| Liaoning Donghua | none |
| Yunnan | none |

== Format ==
The League adopted a new format called "competition system" that is used throughout the season.

=== Stage I ===
1. Divided into three sub-stages in a single round robin. The 14 teams are divided into two groups (A and B) in six pools using the serpentine system based on their previous rank from the 2020–21 season.
  - First sub-stage: Pool A (GA1-7) and Pool B (GB1-7).
  - Second sub-stage: Pool (GA1-4, GB5-7) and Pool D (GA5-7, GB1-4).
  - Third sub-stage: Pool E (GA1-4, GB1-4) and Pool F (GA5-7, GB5-7).

=== Stage II ===
1. Top 8 teams are divided into Pools G and H using the serpentine system.
  - Teams in each groups played in a round-robin first then battle in the quarterfinals in a best-of-three series.
  - Bottom 4 teams from each group will qualify for the 5th–8th places.
2. Bottom 6 teams placed in Pool K to battle in a round robin to determine their final rankings.

=== Stage III ===
1. The top 8 teams battle in a cross-over matches in a best-of-three series in quarterfinals.
  - QF1: G1 v H4
  - QF2: H1 v G4
  - QF3: H2 v G3
  - QF4: G2 v H3
2. Winner teams from each brackets qualified for the semifinals.
3. The top four teams will play in a best-of-three series in the semifinals. Winners will advance to championship match while losers will battle for 3rd place match.
  - SF1: G1H4 winner v H2G3 winner
  - SF2: H1G4 winner v G2H3 winner
4. The bottom 4 teams will play in a best-of-three series in the 5th–8th classification. Winners advance to 5th place match while losers will battle for 7th place match.
  - 5–8C1: G1H4 loser v H2G3 loser
  - 5–8C2: H1G4 loser v G2H3 loser

=== Stage IV (final) ===
1. Championship match, 3rd place match, 5th place match and 7th place match will be a best-of-three series.

== Season standing procedure ==
The ranking of the round robin group matches are determined to the following criteria and order:

1. Total number of victories (matches won, matches lost)
2. In the event of a tie, the following first tiebreaker will apply: The teams will be ranked by the most points gained per match as follows:
  - Match won 3–0 or 3–1: 3 points for the winner, 0 points for the loser
  - Match won 3–2: 2 points for the winner, 1 point for the loser
  - Match forfeited: 3 points for the winner, 0 points (0–25, 0–25, 0–25) for the loser
3. If teams are still tied after examining the number of victories and points gained, then the CVL will examine the results in order to break the tie in the following order:
  - Sets quotient: if two or more teams are tied on the number of points gained, they will be ranked by the quotient resulting from the division of the number of all sets won by the number of all sets lost.
  - Points quotient: if the tie persists based on the sets quotient, the teams will be ranked by the quotient resulting from the division of all points scored by the total of points lost during all sets.
  - If the tie persists based on the points quotient, the tie will be broken based on the team that won the match of the Round Robin Group Stage between the tied teams. When the tie in points quotient is between three or more teams, these teams ranked taking into consideration only the matches involving the teams in question.

== Regular round ==
- All times are China Standard Time (UTC+8:00).

=== Stage I ===
==== Standings ====
| Pos | Team | Pld | W | L | Pts | SW | SL | SR | SPW | SPL | SPR | Qualification |
|---|---|---|---|---|---|---|---|---|---|---|---|---|
| 1 | Shanghai Bright (Q) | 13 | 13 | 0 | 38 | 39 | 5 | 7.800 | 1097 | 869 | 1.262 | Qualified to Pool G |
| 2 | Shandong Ruchen (Q) | 13 | 10 | 3 | 29 | 33 | 15 | 2.200 | 1093 | 965 | 1.133 | Qualified to Pool H |
| 3 | Beijing BAIC Motor (Q) | 13 | 9 | 4 | 29 | 32 | 16 | 2.000 | 1119 | 950 | 1.178 | Qualified to Pool H |
| 4 | Baoding Woli (Q) | 13 | 9 | 4 | 25 | 32 | 21 | 1.524 | 1194 | 1103 | 1.083 | Qualified to Pool G |
| 5 | Zhejiang Sports Lottery (Q) | 13 | 9 | 4 | 28 | 32 | 15 | 2.133 | 1115 | 883 | 1.263 | Qualified to Pool G |
| 6 | Tianjin Food Group (Q) | 13 | 8 | 5 | 23 | 29 | 23 | 1.261 | 1169 | 1107 | 1.056 | Qualified to Pool H |
| 7 | Sichuan (Q) | 13 | 7 | 6 | 22 | 28 | 22 | 1.273 | 1078 | 1062 | 1.015 | Qualified to Pool H |
| 8 | Nanjing Radio and Television Maomao (Q) | 13 | 7 | 6 | 20 | 26 | 24 | 1.083 | 1132 | 1084 | 1.044 | Qualified to Pool G |
| 9 | Shenzhen Mingjinhai (Q) | 13 | 7 | 6 | 20 | 26 | 24 | 1.083 | 1069 | 1100 | 0.972 | Qualified for the 9th–14th classification |
| 10 | Fujian (Q) | 13 | 6 | 7 | 18 | 20 | 23 | 0.870 | 976 | 1022 | 0.955 | Qualified for the 9th–14th classification |
| 11 | Henan (Q) | 13 | 3 | 10 | 12 | 16 | 31 | 0.516 | 965 | 1058 | 0.912 | Qualified for the 9th–14th classification |
| 12 | Huangshi Dongchu (Q) | 13 | 2 | 11 | 6 | 8 | 34 | 0.235 | 821 | 1018 | 0.806 | Qualified for the 9th–14th classification |
| 13 | Yunnan (Q) | 13 | 1 | 12 | 3 | 3 | 37 | 0.081 | 671 | 994 | 0.675 | Qualified for the 9th–14th classification |
| 14 | Liaoning Donghua (Q) | 13 | 0 | 13 | 0 | 5 | 39 | 0.128 | 808 | 1091 | 0.741 | Qualified for the 9th–14th classification |

Source: 2022-2023中国男子排球超级联赛 第一阶段积分排名表
(Q) Qualified for the phase indicated

==== Pool A ====
| Date | Time | | Score | | Set 1 | Set 2 | Set 3 | Set 4 | Set 5 | Total | Report |
Round 1
| 1 Dec | 14:30 | Liaoning Donghua | 0–3 | Henan | 12–25 | 18–25 | 24–25 | | | 54–75 | P2 |
| 1 Dec | 17:00 | Fujian | 3–1 | Sichuan | 19–25 | 25–22 | 25–23 | 25–18 | | 94–88 | P2 |
| 1 Dec | 19:30 | Beijing BAIC Motor | 3–1 | Zhejiang Sports Lottery | 26–28 | 26–24 | 26–24 | 25–18 | | 103–94 | P2 |
Round 2
| 2 Dec | 14:30 | Liaoning Donghua | 1–3 | Shenzhen Mingjinhai | 25–27 | 25–21 | 23–25 | 14–25 | | 87–98 | P2 |
| 2 Dec | 17:00 | Beijing BAIC Motor | 3–0 | Sichuan | 25–16 | 25–14 | 25–11 | | | 75–41 | P2 |
| 2 Dec | 19:30 | Zhejiang Sports Lottery | 3–0 | Henan | 25–19 | 25–14 | 25–17 | | | 75–50 | P2 |
Round 3
| 3 Dec | 14:30 | Liaoning Donghua | 1–3 | Beijing BAIC Motor | 15–25 | 17–25 | 25–22 | 12–25 | | 69–97 | P2 |
| 3 Dec | 17:00 | Fujian | 0–3 | Zhejiang Sports Lottery | 18–25 | 11–25 | 15–25 | | | 44–75 | P2 |
| 3 Dec | 19:30 | Shenzhen Mingjinhai | 3–0 | Henan | 25–22 | 25–19 | 25–19 | | | 75–60 | P2 |
Round 4
| 4 Dec | 14:30 | Sichuan | 2–3 | Zhejiang Sports Lottery | 14–25 | 25–22 | 11–25 | 25–22 | 11–15 | 86–109 | P2 |
| 4 Dec | 17:00 | Fujian Pingtan | 3–0 | Liaoning Donghua | 25–19 | 25–17 | 25–21 | | | 75–57 | P2 |
| 4 Dec | 19:30 | Shenzhen Mingjinhai | 1–3 | Beijing BAIC Motor | 18–25 | 13–25 | 25–23 | 18–25 | | 74–98 | P2 |
Round 5
| 5 Dec | 14:30 | Zhejiang Sports Lottery | 3–0 | Liaoning Donghua | 25–11 | 25–16 | 25–13 | | | 75–40 | P2 |
| 5 Dec | 17:00 | Sichuan | 3–2 | Shenzhen Mingjinhai | 25–18 | 21–25 | 25–13 | 23–25 | 15–8 | 109–89 | P2 |
| 5 Dec | 19:30 | Henan | 1–3 | Fujian | 23–25 | 25–27 | 29–27 | 16–25 | | 93–104 | P2 |
Round 6
| 7 Dec | 14:30 | Sichuan | 3–0 | Liaoning Donghua | 25–15 | 25–16 | 25–15 | | | 75–46 | P2 |
| 7 Dec | 17:00 | Shenzhen Mingjinhai | 3–1 | Fujian | 25–20 | 25–22 | 19–25 | 36–34 | | 105–101 | P2 |
| 7 Dec | 19:30 | Henan | 0–3 | Beijing BAIC Motor | 18–25 | 21–25 | 14–25 | | | 53–75 | P2 |
Round 7
| 8 Dec | 14:30 | Henan | 0–3 | Sichuan | 24–26 | 17–25 | 21–25 | | | 62–76 | P2 |
| 8 Dec | 17:00 | Zhejiang Sports Lottery | 3–1 | Shenzhen Mingjinhai | 27–29 | 25–19 | 25–12 | 25–16 | | 102–76 | P2 |
| 8 Dec | 19:30 | Beijing BAIC Motor | 3–0 | Fujian | 25–15 | 25–17 | 25–21 | | | 75–53 | P2 |

==== Pool B ====
- Venue: Wuyuan County Sports Center Gymnasium

| Date | Time | | Score | | Set 1 | Set 2 | Set 3 | Set 4 | Set 5 | Total | Report |
Round 1
| 29 Oct | 14:30 | Shanghai Bright | 3–0 | Huangshi Dongchu | 25–21 | 25–15 | 25–14 | | | 75–50 | P2 |
| 29 Oct | 17:00 | Tianjin Food Group | 3–2 | Shandong Ruchen | 18–25 | 25–16 | 22–25 | 25–23 | 15–13 | 105–102 | P2 |
| 29 Oct | 19:30 | Nanjing Radio and Television Maomao | 2–3 | Baoding Woli | 33–31 | 24–26 | 21–25 | 25–19 | 15–17 | 118–118 | P2 |
Round 2
| 30 Oct | 14:30 | Shandong Ruchen | 3–0 | Yunnan | 25–17 | 25–15 | 25–18 | | | 75–50 | P2 |
| 30 Oct | 17:00 | Baoding Woli | 3–0 | Huangshi Dongchu | 28–26 | 25–19 | 25–23 | | | 78–68 | P2 |
| 30 Oct | 19:30 | Tianjin Food Group | 0–3 | Shanghai Bright | 22–25 | 24–26 | 18–25 | | | 64–76 | P2 |
Round 3
| 31 Oct | 14:30 | Nanjing Radio and Television Maomao | 3–0 | Yunnan | 25–15 | 25–17 | 25–16 | | | 75–48 | P2 |
| 31 Oct | 17:00 | Tianjin Food Group | 3–1 | Huangshi Dongchu | 25–27 | 25–18 | 25–22 | 25–23 | | 100–90 | P2 |
| 31 Oct | 19:30 | Shandong Ruchen | 3–2 | Baoding Woli | 25–22 | 19–25 | 18–25 | 25–22 | 15–11 | 102–105 | P2 |
Round 4
| 1 Nov | 14:30 | Huangshi Dongchu | 0–3 | Shandong Ruchen | 16–25 | 17–25 | 22–25 | | | 55–75 | P2 |
| 1 Nov | 17:00 | Yunnan | 0–3 | Tianjin Food Group | 16–25 | 18–25 | 19–25 | | | 53–75 | P2 |
| 1 Nov | 19:30 | Shanghai Bright | 3–0 | Nanjing Radio and Television Maomao | 25–23 | 25–15 | 25–17 | | | 75–55 | P2 |
Round 5
| 2 Nov | 14:30 | Yunnan | 0–3 | Shanghai Bright | 7–25 | 12–25 | 18–25 | | | 37–75 | P2 |
| 2 Nov | 17:00 | Huangshi Dongchu | 0–3 | Nanjing Radio and Television Maomao | 15–25 | 22–25 | 22–25 | | | 59–75 | P2 |
| 2 Nov | 19:30 | Baoding Woli | 3–1 | Tianjin Food Group | 19–25 | 25–20 | 26–24 | 25–19 | | 95–88 | P2 |
Round 6
| 3 Nov | 14:30 | Yunnan | 0–3 | Baoding Woli | 15–25 | 15–25 | 13–25 | | | 43–75 | P2 |
| 3 Nov | 17:00 | Shanghai Bright | 3–1 | Shandong Ruchen | 25–18 | 25–23 | 22–25 | 25–20 | | 97–86 | P2 |
| 3 Nov | 19:30 | Nanjing Radio and Television Maomao | 3–2 | Tianjin Food Group | 23–25 | 25–22 | 20–25 | 25–18 | 15–10 | 108–100 | P2 |
Round 7
| 4 Nov | 14:30 | Huangshi Dongchu | 3–0 | Yunnan | 25–17 | 26–24 | 25–22 | | | 76–63 | P2 |
| 4 Nov | 17:00 | Shandong Ruchen | 3–1 | Nanjing Radio and Television Maomao | 25–18 | 25–17 | 21–25 | 25–21 | | 96–81 | P2 |
| 4 Nov | 19:30 | Baoding Woli | 0–3 | Shanghai Bright | 21–25 | 16–25 | 21–25 | | | 58–75 | P2 |

==== Pool C ====
- Venue: Qinhuangdao Training Base Competition Hall

| Date | Time | | Score | | Set 1 | Set 2 | Set 3 | Set 4 | Set 5 | Total | Report |
Round 8
| 10 Nov | 14:30 | Henan | 2–3 | Baoding Woli | 23–25 | 25–20 | 19–25 | 25–22 | 8–15 | 100–107 | P2 |
| 10 Nov | 17:00 | Zhejiang Sports Lottery | 3–0 | Yunnan | 25–11 | 25–11 | 25–16 | | | 75–38 | P2 |
| 10 Nov | 19:30 | Beijing BAIC Motor | 3–0 | Huangshi Dongchu | 25–21 | 25–15 | 25–11 | | | 75–47 | P2 |
Round 9
| 11 Nov | 14:30 | Baoding Woli | 3–2 | Sichuan | 25–27 | 23–25 | 25–23 | 25–11 | 15–7 | 113–93 | P2 |
| 11 Nov | 17:00 | Huangshi Dongchu | 1–3 | Henan | 22–25 | 25–18 | 14–25 | 14–25 | | 75–93 | P2 |
| 11 Nov | 19:30 | Yunnan | 0–3 | Beijing BAIC Motor | 12–25 | 9–25 | 11–25 | | | 32–75 | P2 |
Round 10
| 12 Nov | 14:30 | Zhejiang Sports Lottery | 2–3 | Baoding Woli | 25–19 | 25–20 | 23–25 | 21–25 | 12–15 | 106–104 | P2 |
| 12 Nov | 17:00 | Henan | 3–0 | Yunnan | 25–18 | 25–19 | 25–18 | | | 75–55 | P2 |
| 12 Nov | 19:30 | Sichuan | 3–0 | Huangshi Dongchu | 25–20 | 25–21 | 25–18 | | | 75–59 | P2 |
Round 11
| 13 Nov | 14:30 | Yunnan | 0–3 | Sichuan | 11–25 | 16–25 | 18–25 | | | 45–75 | P2 |
| 13 Nov | 17:00 | Huangshi Dongchu | 0–3 | Zhejiang Sports Lottery | 9–25 | 8–25 | 18–25 | | | 35–75 | P2 |
| 13 Nov | 19:30 | Baoding Woli | 1–3 | Beijing BAIC Motor | 23–25 | 25–20 | 21–25 | 22–25 | | 91–95 | P2 |

==== Pool D ====
- Venue: Wuyuan County Sports Center Gymnasium

| Date | Time | | Score | | Set 1 | Set 2 | Set 3 | Set 4 | Set 5 | Total | Report |
Round 8
| 10 Nov | 14:30 | Nanjing Radio and Television Maomao | 2–3 | Shenzhen Mingjinhai | 22–25 | 16–25 | 25–17 | 25–22 | 10–15 | 98–104 | P2 |
| 10 Nov | 17:00 | Tianjin Food Group | 3–0 | Liaoning Donghua | 25–12 | 25–15 | 28–26 | | | 78–53 | P2 |
| 10 Nov | 19:30 | Shanghai Bright | 3–0 | Fujian | 25–22 | 28–26 | 31–29 | | | 84–77 | P2 |
Round 9
| 11 Nov | 14:30 | Fujian | 1–3 | Tianjin Food Group | 24–26 | 25–20 | 16–25 | 21–25 | | 86–96 | P2 |
| 11 Nov | 17:00 | Liaoning Donghua | 1–3 | Shandong Ruchen | 17–25 | 25–20 | 13–25 | 19–25 | | 74–95 | P2 |
| 11 Nov | 19:30 | Shenzhen Mingjinhai | 1–3 | Shanghai Bright | 19–25 | 13–25 | 25–21 | 21–25 | | 78–96 | P2 |
Round 10
| 12 Nov | 14:30 | Nanjing Radio and Television Maomao | 3–0 | Liaoning Donghua | 25–16 | 25–20 | 25–15 | | | 75–51 | P2 |
| 12 Nov | 17:00 | Tianjin Food Group | 3–0 | Shenzhen Mingjinhai | 25–18 | 25–19 | 25–22 | | | 75–59 | P2 |
| 12 Nov | 19:30 | Shandong Ruchen | 3–0 | Fujian | 25–17 | 25–15 | 25–16 | | | 75–48 | P2 |
Round 11
| 13 Nov | 14:30 | Fujian | 3–0 | Nanjing Radio and Television Maomao | 27–25 | 25–21 | 37–35 | | | 89–81 | P2 |
| 13 Nov | 17:00 | Shenzhen Mingjinhai | 0–3 | Shandong Ruchen | 18–25 | 23–25 | 15–25 | | | 56–75 | P2 |
| 13 Nov | 19:30 | Liaoning Donghua | 0–3 | Shanghai Bright | 15–25 | 12–25 | 18–25 | | | 45–75 | P2 |

==== Pool E ====
- Venue: Hafei Sports Center Gymnasium

| Date | Time | | Score | | Set 1 | Set 2 | Set 3 | Set 4 | Set 5 | Total | Report |
Round 12
| 23 Nov | 14:00 | Beijing BAIC Motor | 2–3 | Nanjing Radio and Television Maomao | 21–25 | 23–25 | 25–22 | 25–22 | 11–15 | 105–109 | P2 |
| 23 Nov | 16:00 | Zhejiang Sports Lottery | 2–3 | Shandong Ruchen | 25–17 | 20–25 | 21–25 | 25–17 | 13–15 | 104–99 | P2 |
| 23 Nov | 18:00 | Shanghai Bright | 3–2 | Sichuan | 25–19 | 22–25 | 33–35 | 25–17 | 15–10 | 120–106 | P2 |
| 23 Nov | 20:00 | Henan | 2–3 | Tianjin Food Group | 25–15 | 17–25 | 25–19 | 15–25 | 9–15 | 91–99 | P2 |
Round 13
| 24 Nov | 14:00 | Beijing BAIC Motor | 2–3 | Tianjin Food Group | 22–25 | 25–23 | 29–27 | 16–25 | 10–15 | 102–115 | P2 |
| 24 Nov | 16:00 | Nanjing Radio and Television Maomao | 3–0 | Sichuan | 25–19 | 25–19 | 27–25 | | | 77–63 | P2 |
| 24 Nov | 18:00 | Shanghai Bright | 3–0 | Zhejiang Sports Lottery | 25–20 | 27–25 | 25–23 | | | 77–68 | P2 |
| 24 Nov | 20:00 | Henan | 0–3 | Shandong Ruchen | 19–25 | 18–25 | 22–25 | | | 59–75 | P2 |
Round 14
| 25 Nov | 14:00 | Nanjing Radio and Television Maomao | 0–3 | Zhejiang Sports Lottery | 29–31 | 17–25 | 21–25 | | | 67–81 | P2 |
| 25 Nov | 16:00 | Beijing BAIC Motor | 0–3 | Shandong Ruchen | 23–25 | 19–25 | 14–25 | | | 56–75 | P2 |
| 25 Nov | 18:00 | Shanghai Bright | 3–0 | Henan | 25–20 | 25–15 | 25–23 | | | 75–58 | P2 |
| 25 Nov | 20:00 | Tianjin Food Group | 2–3 | Sichuan | 26–24 | 28–30 | 19–25 | 22–25 | 12–15 | 107–119 | P2 |
Round 15
| 26 Nov | 14:00 | Sichuan | 3–0 | Shandong Ruchen | 25–20 | 25–22 | 25–21 | | | 75–63 | P2 |
| 26 Nov | 16:00 | Zhejiang Sports Lottery | 3–0 | Tianjin Food Group | 25–18 | 26–24 | 25–22 | | | 76–64 | P2 |
| 26 Nov | 18:00 | Henan | 2–3 | Nanjing Radio and Television Maomao | 18–25 | 10–25 | 25–21 | 28–26 | 14–16 | 95–113 | P2 |
| 26 Nov | 20:00 | Beijing BAIC Motor | 1–3 | Shanghai Bright | 25–22 | 21–25 | 20–25 | 21–25 | | 87–97 | P2 |

==== Pool F ====
- Venue: Qinhuangdao Training Base Competition Hall

| Date | Time | | Score | | Set 1 | Set 2 | Set 3 | Set 4 | Set 5 | Total | Report |
Round 12
| 20 Nov | 14:30 | Baoding Woli | 3–0 | Fujian | 25–19 | 25–17 | 25–19 | | | 75–55 | P2 |
| 20 Nov | 17:00 | Huangshi Dongchu | 0–3 | Shenzhen Mingjinhai | 15–25 | 20–25 | 15–25 | | | 50–75 | P2 |
| 20 Nov | 19:30 | Yunnan | 3–1 | Liaoning Donghua | 27–25 | 22–25 | 25–21 | 25–22 | | 99–93 | P2 |
Round 13
| 21 Nov | 14:30 | Fujian | 3–0 | Huangshi Dongchu | 25–21 | 25–19 | 25–19 | | | 75–59 | P2 |
| 21 Nov | 17:00 | Shenzhen Mingjinhai | 3–0 | Yunnan | 25–12 | 25–15 | 25–22 | | | 75–49 | P2 |
| 21 Nov | 19:30 | Baoding Woli | 3–0 | Liaoning Donghua | 25–20 | 25–21 | 25–14 | | | 75–55 | P2 |
Round 14
| 22 Nov | 14:30 | Liaoning Donghua | 1–3 | Huangshi Dongchu | 25–23 | 17–25 | 21–25 | 21–25 | | 84–98 | P2 |
| 22 Nov | 17:00 | Baoding Woli | 2–3 | Shenzhen Mingjinhai | 25–20 | 19–25 | 25–20 | 20–25 | 11–15 | 100–105 | P2 |
| 22 Nov | 19:30 | Yunnan | 0–3 | Fujian | 20–25 | 19–25 | 20–25 | | | 59–75 | P2 |

=== Stage II ===
==== Standings ====
| Pos | Grp | Team | Pld | W | L | Pts | SW | SL | SR | SPW | SPL | SPR | Qualification |
|---|---|---|---|---|---|---|---|---|---|---|---|---|---|
| 1 | G | Zhejiang Sports Lottery | 3 | 3 | 0 | 8 | 9 | 2 | 4.500 | 261 | 217 | 1.203 | Qualified for the Quarterfinals |
| 2 | H | Beijing BAIC Motor | 3 | 3 | 0 | 8 | 9 | 3 | 3.000 | 275 | 221 | 1.244 | Qualified for the Quarterfinals |
| 3 | G | Baoding Woli | 3 | 2 | 1 | 6 | 6 | 3 | 2.000 | 203 | 197 | 1.030 | Qualified for the Quarterfinals |
| 4 | H | Tianjin Food Group | 3 | 2 | 1 | 6 | 7 | 4 | 1.750 | 255 | 248 | 1.028 | Qualified for the Quarterfinals |
| 5 | H | Shandong Ruchen | 3 | 1 | 2 | 3 | 4 | 6 | 0.667 | 230 | 240 | 0.958 | Qualified for the Quarterfinals |
| 6 | G | Shanghai Bright | 3 | 1 | 2 | 3 | 5 | 8 | 0.625 | 274 | 270 | 1.015 | Qualified for the Quarterfinals |
| 7 | H | Sichuan | 3 | 0 | 3 | 1 | 2 | 9 | 0.222 | 206 | 254 | 0.811 | Qualified for the Quarterfinals |
| 8 | G | Nanjing Radio and Television Maomao | 3 | 0 | 3 | 1 | 2 | 9 | 0.222 | 207 | 261 | 0.793 | Qualified for the Quarterfinals |

| Pos | Grp | Team | Pld | W | L | Pts | SW | SL | SR | SPW | SPL | SPR |
|---|---|---|---|---|---|---|---|---|---|---|---|---|
| 1 | K | Henan | 5 | 5 | 0 | 15 | 15 | 2 | 7.500 | 416 | 331 | 1.257 |
| 2 | K | Shenzhen Mingjinhai | 5 | 4 | 1 | 12 | 13 | 5 | 2.600 | 449 | 373 | 1.204 |
| 3 | K | Fujian | 5 | 3 | 2 | 8 | 9 | 10 | 0.900 | 433 | 411 | 1.054 |
| 4 | K | Huangshi Dongchu | 5 | 2 | 3 | 6 | 8 | 9 | 0.889 | 384 | 369 | 1.041 |
| 5 | K | Liaoning Donghua | 5 | 1 | 4 | 3 | 6 | 12 | 0.500 | 370 | 435 | 0.851 |
| 6 | K | Yunnan | 5 | 0 | 5 | 1 | 2 | 15 | 0.133 | 276 | 409 | 0.675 |

==== Pool G ====
- Venue: Hebei Agricultural University West Campus Gymnasium

| Date | Time | | Score | | Set 1 | Set 2 | Set 3 | Set 4 | Set 5 | Total | Report |
Round 16
| 22 Dec | 17:00 | Shanghai Bright | 2–3 | Zhejiang Sports Lottery | 25–22 | 22–25 | 26–24 | 23–25 | 12–15 | 108–111 | P2 |
| 22 Dec | 19:30 | Baoding Woli | 3–0 | Nanjing Radio and Television Maomao | 26–24 | 25–20 | 25–22 | | | 76–66 | P2 |
Round 17
| 23 Dec | 15:00 | Shanghai Bright | 3–2 | Nanjing Radio and Television Maomao | 22–25 | 25–14 | 25–11 | 23–25 | 15–9 | 110–84 | P2 |
| 23 Dec | 19:30 | Zhejiang Sports Lottery | 3–0 | Baoding Woli | 25–14 | 25–14 | 25–19 | | | 75–47 | P2 |
Round 18
| 24 Dec | 17:00 | Nanjing Radio and Television Maomao | 0–3 | Zhejiang Sports Lottery | 15–25 | 23–25 | 19–25 | | | 57–75 | P2 |
| 24 Dec | 19:30 | Baoding Woli | 3–0 | Shanghai Bright | 25–21 | 25–20 | 25–15 | | | 75–56 | P2 |

==== Pool H ====
- Venue: Hebei Agricultural University West Campus Gymnasium

| Date | Time | | Score | | Set 1 | Set 2 | Set 3 | Set 4 | Set 5 | Total | Report |
Round 16
| 22 Dec | 13:00 | Tianjin Food Group | 3–0 | Sichuan | 25–19 | 25–15 | 25–22 | | | 75–56 | P2 |
| 22 Dec | 15:00 | Shandong Ruchen | 0–3 | Beijing BAIC Motor | 18–25 | 23–25 | 18–25 | | | 59–75 | P2 |
Round 17
| 23 Dec | 13:00 | Shandong Ruchen | 3–0 | Sichuan | 25–22 | 25–21 | 25–21 | | | 75–64 | P2 |
| 23 Dec | 17:00 | Beijing BAIC Motor | 3–1 | Tianjin Food Group | 25–16 | 21–25 | 25–19 | 25–19 | | 96–79 | P2 |
Round 18
| 24 Dec | 13:00 | Sichuan | 2–3 | Beijing BAIC Motor | 25–18 | 20–25 | 16–25 | 15–21 | 7–15 | 83–104 | P2 |
| 24 Dec | 15:00 | Tianjin Food Group | 3–1 | Shandong Ruchen | 26–24 | 25–22 | 25–27 | 25–23 | | 101–96 | P2 |

==== Pool K ====
- Venue: Qinhuangdao Training Base Competition Hall

| Date | Time | | Score | | Set 1 | Set 2 | Set 3 | Set 4 | Set 5 | Total | Report |
Round 15
| 28 Dec | 15:00 | Shenzhen Mingjinhai | 3–1 | Liaoning Donghua | 25–20 | 25–16 | 32–34 | 25–20 | | 107–90 | P2 |
| 28 Dec | 17:00 | Henan | 3–0 | Huangshi Dongchu | 25–19 | 25–21 | 25–19 | | | 75–59 | P2 |
| 28 Dec | 19:30 | Fujian | 3–2 | Yunnan | 25–14 | 20–25 | 25–11 | 24–26 | 15–8 | 109–84 | P2 |
Round 16
| 29 Dec | 15:00 | Liaoning Donghua | 0–3 | Huangshi Dongchu | 21–25 | 12–25 | 13–25 | | | 46–75 | P2 |
| 29 Dec | 15:00 | Yunnan | 0–3 | Henan | 20–25 | 14–25 | 19–25 | | | 53–75 | P2 |
| 29 Dec | 17:30 | Shenzhen Mingjinhai | 3–0 | Fujian | 25–19 | 27–25 | 25–22 | | | 77–66 | P2 |
Round 17
| 30 Dec | 15:00 | Huangshi Dongchu | 3–0 | Yunnan | 25–18 | 25–12 | 25–20 | | | 75–50 | P2 |
| 30 Dec | 17:00 | Fujian | 3–1 | Liaoning | 25–23 | 28–30 | 25–19 | 25–15 | | 103–87 | P2 |
| 30 Dec | 19:30 | Henan | 3–1 | Shenzhen Mingjinhai | 25–20 | 15–25 | 25–21 | 25–22 | | 90–88 | P2 |
Round 18
| 31 Dec | 15:00 | Liaoning | 3–0 | Yunnan | 25–19 | 25–21 | 25–11 | | | 75–51 | P2 |
| 31 Dec | 17:00 | Shenzhen Mingjinhai | 3–1 | Huangshi Dongchu | 29–27 | 25–16 | 23–25 | 25–21 | | 102–89 | P2 |
| 31 Dec | 19:30 | Fujian | 0–3 | Henan | 25–27 | 23–25 | 11–25 | | | 59–77 | P2 |
Round 19
| 1 Jan | 15:00 | Yunnan | 0–3 | Shenzhen Mingjinhai | 10–25 | 13–25 | 15–25 | | | 38–75 | P2 |
| 1 Jan | 17:00 | Henan | 3–1 | Liaoning | 24–26 | 25–13 | 25–14 | 25–19 | | 99–72 | P2 |
| 1 Jan | 19:30 | Huangshi Dongchu | 1–3 | Fujian | 20–25 | 22–25 | 25–21 | 19–25 | | 86–96 | P2 |

== Final stage ==
- All times are China Standard Time (UTC+8:00).
- All matches are best-of-three series.

Quarterfinals
26–27 December
G1 | Zhejiang Sports Lottery | 3 | 3 | —
H4 | Sichuan | 1 | 0 | —
26–27 December
H2 | Tianjin | 0 | 0 | —
G3 | Shanghai Bright | 3 | 3 | —
26–27 December
H1 | Beijing BAIC Motor | 3 | 3 | —
G4 | Nanjing Radio and Television Maomao | 0 | 0 | —
26–28 December
G2 | Baoding Woli | 2 | 3 | 1
H3 | Shandong Ruchen | 3 | 0 | 3

Semifinals
30 December – 1 January
Zhejiang Sports Lottery | 3 | 0 | 0
Shanghai Bright | 2 | 3 | 3
30–31 December
Beijing BAIC Motor | 3 | 3 | —
Shandong Ruchen | 1 | 1 | —

Final
4–5 January
Shanghai Bright | 1 | 0 | —
Beijing BAIC Motor | 3 | 3 | —
3rd place match
3–4 January
Zhejiang Sports Lottery | 3 | 3 | —
Shandong Ruchen | 2 | 1 | —

5th–8th semifinals
30 December – 1 January
Sichuan | 0 | 0 | —
Tianjin Food Group | 3 | 3 | —
30 December – 1 January
Nanjing Radio and Television Maomao | 0 | 3 | 0
Baoding Woli | 3 | 1 | 3

5th place match
3–5 January
Tianjin Food Group | 1 | 3 | 1
Baoding Woli | 3 | 0 | 3
7th place match
3–5 January
Sichuan | 3 | 1 | 3
Nanjing Radio and Television Maomao | 2 | 3 | 1

=== Quarterfinals ===
- Venue: Hebei Agricultural University West Campus Gymnasium

| Date | Time | | Score | | Set 1 | Set 2 | Set 3 | Set 4 | Set 5 | Total | Report |
(G1) Zhejiang vs. (H4) Sichuan
| 26 Dec | 13:00 | Zhejiang Sports Lottery | 3–1 | Sichuan | 22–25 | 25–18 | 25–17 | 25–18 | | 97–78 | P2 |
| 27 Dec | 13:00 | Sichuan | 0–3 | Zhejiang Sports Lottery | 16–25 | 26–28 | 17–25 | | | 59–78 | P2 |
(H1) Beijing vs. (G4) Nanjing
| 26 Dec | 15:00 | Beijing BAIC Motor | 3–0 | Nanjing Radio and Television Maomao | 25–18 | 25–17 | 25–16 | | | 75–51 | P2 |
| 27 Dec | 15:00 | Nanjing Radio and Television Maomao | 0–3 | Beijing BAIC Motor | 15–25 | 21–25 | 14–25 | | | 50–75 | P2 |
(H2) Tianjin vs. (G3) Shangha
| 26 Dec | 17:00 | Tianjin Food Group | 0–3 | Shanghai Bright | 20–25 | 23–25 | 23–25 | | | 66–75 | P2 |
| 27 Dec | 17:00 | Shanghai Bright | 3–0 | Tianjin Food Group | 25–18 | 25–16 | 25–20 | | | 75–54 | P2 |
(G2) Baoding vs. (H3) |Shandong
| 26 Dec | 19:30 | Baoding Woli | 2–3 | Shandong Ruchen | 25–23 | 28–30 | 25–23 | 19–25 | 13–15 | 110–116 | P2 |
| 27 Dec | 19:30 | Shandong Ruchen | 0–3 | Baoding Woli | 22–25 | 18–25 | 24–26 | | | 64–76 | P2 |
| 28 Dec | | Baoding Woli | 1–3 | Shandong Ruchen | 25–20 | 15–25 | 23–25 | 22–25 | | 85–95 | P2 |

=== 5th–8th semifinals ===
| Date | Time | | Score | | Set 1 | Set 2 | Set 3 | Set 4 | Set 5 | Total | Report |
Sichuan vs. Tianjin
| 30 Dec | 13:00 | Sichuan | 0–3 | Tianjin Food Group | 15–25 | 22–25 | 14–25 | | | 51–75 | P2 |
| 31 Dec | 13:00 | Tianjin Food Group | 3–0 | Sichuan | 25–18 | 25–17 | 25–23 | | | 75–58 | P2 |
Nanjing vs. Baoding
| 30 Dec | 15:00 | Nanjing Radio and Television Maomao | 0–3 | Baoding Woli | 23–25 | 27–29 | 20–25 | | | 70–79 | P2 |
| 31 Dec | 15:00 | Baoding Woli | 1–3 | Nanjing Radio and Television Maomao | 24–26 | 18–25 | 25–18 | 18–25 | | 85–94 | P2 |
| 1 Jan | 15:00 | Nanjing Radio and Television Maomao | 0–3 | Baoding Woli | 23–25 | 17–25 | 21–25 | | | 61–75 | P2 |

=== Semifinals ===
| Date | Time | | Score | | Set 1 | Set 2 | Set 3 | Set 4 | Set 5 | Total | Report |
Beijing vs. Shandong
| 30 Dec | 17:00 | Beijing BAIC Motor | 3–1 | Shandong Ruchen | 25–20 | 25–10 | 22–25 | 25–22 | | 97–77 | P2 |
| 31 Dec | 17:00 | Shandong Ruchen | 1–3 | Beijing BAIC Motor | 18–25 | 15–25 | 25–23 | 22–25 | | 80–98 | P2 |
Zhejiang vs. Shanghai
| 30 Dec | 19:30 | Zhejiang Sports Lottery | 3–2 | Shanghai Bright | 18–25 | 25–19 | 25–18 | 24–26 | 18–16 | 110–104 | P2 |
| 31 Dec | 19:30 | Shanghai Bright | 3–0 | Zhejiang Sports Lottery | 25–22 | 25–23 | 25–20 | | | 75–65 | P2 |
| 1 Jan | 19:30 | Zhejiang Sports Lottery | 0–3 | Shanghai Bright | 16–25 | 16–25 | 18–25 | | | 50–75 | P2 |

=== 7th place match ===
| Date | Time | | Score | | Set 1 | Set 2 | Set 3 | Set 4 | Set 5 | Total | Report |
Sichuan vs. Nanjing
| 3 Jan | 15:00 | Sichuan | 3–2 | Nanjing Radio and Television Maomao | 25–23 | 18–25 | 19–25 | 25–13 | 15–13 | 102–99 | P2 |
| 4 Jan | 13:00 | Nanjing Radio and Television Maomao | 3–1 | Sichuan | 25–20 | 25–17 | 20–25 | 25–17 | | 95–79 | P2 |
| 5 Jan | 13:00 | Sichuan | 3–1 | Nanjing Radio and Television Maomao | 25–20 | 25–19 | 13–25 | 28–26 | | 91–90 | P2 |

=== 5th place match ===
| Date | Time | | Score | | Set 1 | Set 2 | Set 3 | Set 4 | Set 5 | Total | Report |
Tianjin vs. Baoding
| 3 Jan | 17:00 | Tianjin Food Group | 1–3 | Baoding Woli | 16–25 | 25–19 | 19–25 | 15–25 | | 75–94 | P2 |
| 4 Jan | 15:00 | Baoding Woli | 0–3 | Tianjin Food Group | 17–25 | 23–25 | 24–25 | | | 64–75 | P2 |
| 5 Jan | 15:00 | Tianjin Food Group | 1–3 | Baoding Woli | 21–25 | 25–17 | 13–25 | 23–25 | | 82–92 | P2 |

=== 3rd place match ===
| Date | Time | | Score | | Set 1 | Set 2 | Set 3 | Set 4 | Set 5 | Total | Report |
Zhejiang vs. Shandong
| 3 Jan | 19:30 | Zhejiang Sports Lottery | 3–2 | Shandong Ruchen | 18–25 | 25–15 | 25–19 | 22–25 | 15–9 | 105–93 | P2 |
| 4 Jan | 17:00 | Shandong Ruchen | 1–3 | Zhejiang Sports Lottery | 13–25 | 25–15 | 27–29 | 14–25 | | 79–94 | P2 |

=== Final ===
| Date | Time | | Score | | Set 1 | Set 2 | Set 3 | Set 4 | Set 5 | Total | Report |
Shanghai vs. Beijing
| 4 Jan | 19:30 | Shanghai Bright | 1–3 | Beijing BAIC Motor | 23–25 | 25–16 | 26–28 | 24–26 | | 98–95 | P2 |
| 5 Jan | 19:30 | Beijing BAIC Motor | 3–0 | Shanghai Bright | 25–12 | 25–18 | 25–21 | | | 75–51 | P2 |

== Final standings ==
| Rank | Team |
|---|---|
| 1st place, gold medalist(s) | Beijing BAIC Motor |
| 2nd place, silver medalist(s) | Shanghai Bright |
| 3rd place, bronze medalist(s) | Zhejiang Sports Lottery |
| 4 | Shandong Ruchen |
| 5 | Baoding Woli |
| 6 | Tianjin Food Group |
| 7 | Sichuan |
| 8 | Nanjing Radio and Television Maomao |
| 9 | Henan |
| 10 | Shenzhen Mingjinhai |
| 11 | Fujian |
| 12 | Huangshi Dongchu |
| 13 | Liaoning Donghua |
| 14 | Yunnan |

2022–23 Chinese Men's Volleyball Super League Champions
Beijing BAIC Motor
4th title

14–man roster
Deng Xinpeng, Tang Chuanhang, Thomas Jaeschke, Zheng Yang, Ding Wencai, Gu Jiafeng, Maxwell Holt, Liu Ze, Han Huangguang, Yosvany Hernandez, Dan Qinggou, Liu Libin (c), Maksim Shkredau, Xu Tongxi.
Head coach
Li Mu

== Awards ==
- Most valuable player

Liu Ze (CHN) (Beijing)

- Best setter

Liu Ze (CHN) (Beijing)

- Best outside spikers

Zhang Jingyin (CHN) (Zhejiang)
Zhai Dejun (CHN) (Shandong)

- Best middle blockers

Zhang Zhejia (CHN) (Shanghai)
Li Yongzhen (CHN) (Zhejiang)

- Best opposite spiker

Zhang Guanhua (CHN) (Zhejiang)

- Best libero

Qu Zhongshuai (CHN) (Shanghai)

- Best Foreign Player

Yosvany Hernandez (CUB) (Beijing)

- Most popular player

Zhang Jingyin (CHN) (Zhejiang)
