= Michal Finger =

Czech volleyball player (born 1993)

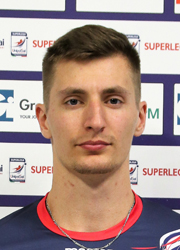

Personal information
- Nationality: Czech
- Born: 2 September 1993 (age 33); Prague, Czech Republic
- Height: 2.01 m (6 ft 7 in)
- Weight: 89 kg (196 lb)
- Spike: 361 cm (142 in)
- Block: 336 cm (132 in)

Volleyball information
- Position: Opposite
- Current club: Al Rayyan

Career
Years	Teams
2008–2014; 2014–2017; 2017–2018; 2018–2019; 2019–2020; 2020; 2020–2021; 2021–	ČZU Praha; VfB Friedrichshafen; Gi Group Monza; Ziraat Bankası Ankara; Olympiacos Piraeus; Al Arabi Doha; Gas Sales Piacenza; Al Rayyan

National team
2013–	Czech Republic
Honours
Men's volleyball
Representing Czech Republic
FIVB Challenger Cup
Silver medal – second place	2018 Matosinhos
European League
Silver medal – second place	2018 Czech Republic
Bronze medal – third place	2013 Turkey

Michal Finger (born 2 September 1993) is a Czech professional volleyball player. He is part of the Czech national team.

== Sporting achievements ==
=== Clubs ===
- National championships
  - 2014/2015 German Cup, with VfB Friedrichshafen
  - 2014/2015 German Championship, with VfB Friedrichshafen
  - 2016/2017 German SuperCup, with VfB Friedrichshafen
  - 2016/2017 German Cup, with VfB Friedrichshafen

=== Individual awards ===
- 2013: European League – Best Spiker
- 2017: German Cup – Most Valuable Player
- 2018: European League – Best Opposite
