= 2013 Men's European Volleyball League =

Tournament details
- Host country: Turkey
- Dates: 13 June – 7 July (qualification); 13–14 July (final round)
- Teams: 12
- Venue: 1 (in 1 host city)

Final positions
- Champions: Belgium (1st title)

Tournament awards
- MVP: (Belgium) Bram Van den Dries

The 2013 Men's European Volleyball League was the tenth edition of the annual Men's European Volleyball League, which featured men's national volleyball teams from twelve European countries. A preliminary league round was played from 13 June to 7 July, and the final four tournament, which was held in Turkey on 13–14 July 2013.

For this years edition, the first four sets were played over 21 points.

Belgium defeated Croatia 3–0 in the final.

== Teams ==
- Austria
- Belarus
- Belgium
- Croatia
- Czech Republic
- Denmark
- Hungary
- Israel
- Montenegro
- Slovakia
- Spain
- Turkey

== League round ==
=== Pool A ===
Pos	Team	Pld	W	L	Pts	SW	SL	SR	SPW	SPL	SPR	Qualification
1	Belgium	12	12	0	34	36	7	5.143	887	736	1.205	Semifinals
2	Slovakia	12	6	6	18	23	21	1.095	858	813	1.055	
3	Austria	12	4	8	14	18	27	0.667	837	909	0.921	
4	Denmark	12	2	10	6	9	31	0.290	709	833	0.851	

==== Leg 1 ====
The tournament was played at Budocenter, Vienna, Austria.

Date	Time		Score		Set 1	Set 2	Set 3	Set 4	Set 5	Total	Report
13 Jun	16:30	Denmark	0–3	Slovakia	15–21	19–21	16–21			50–63	Report
13 Jun	19:30	Belgium	3–2	Austria	15–21	21–14	16–21	21–15	15–11	88–82	Report
14 Jun	18:00	Austria	3–1	Slovakia	24–22	15–21	21–18	21–19		81–80	Report
14 Jun	20:30	Belgium	3–0	Denmark	21–16	22–20	21–19			64–55	Report
15 Jun	18:00	Austria	0–3	Denmark	16–21	17–21	30–32			63–74	Report
15 Jun	20:30	Slovakia	0–3	Belgium	12–21	12–21	20–22			44–64	Report

==== Leg 2 ====
The tournament was played at Antvorskovhallen, Slagelse, Denmark.

Date	Time		Score		Set 1	Set 2	Set 3	Set 4	Set 5	Total	Report
20 Jun	17:00	Slovakia	1–3	Austria	21–13	18–21	17–21	19–21		75–76	Report
20 Jun	19:30	Belgium	3–0	Denmark	21–17	21–18	21–16			63–51	Report
21 Jun	17:00	Austria	2–3	Belgium	14–21	21–19	21–17	14–21	15–17	85–95	Report
21 Jun	19:30	Denmark	1–3	Slovakia	14–21	23–25	21–19	12–21		70–86	Report
22 Jun	15:00	Belgium	3–1	Slovakia	18–21	22–20	21–17	21–17		82–75	Report
22 Jun	17:30	Denmark	3–1	Austria	21–15	14–21	21–15	21–17		77–68	Report

==== Leg 3 ====
The tournament was played in Sporthal Arena, Deurne, Belgium.

Date	Time		Score		Set 1	Set 2	Set 3	Set 4	Set 5	Total	Report
28 Jun	17:00	Denmark	0–3	Austria	20–22	18–21	19–21			57–64	Report
28 Jun	20:00	Belgium	3–1	Slovakia	25–23	17–21	21–19	21–18		84–81	Report
29 Jun	17:00	Austria	1–3	Slovakia	21–16	14–21	19–21	16–21		70–79	Report
29 Jun	20:00	Denmark	0–3	Belgium	20–22	13–21	17–21			50–64	Report
30 Jun	15:00	Slovakia	3–0	Denmark	21–10	21–15	21–18			63–43	Report
30 Jun	18:00	Austria	0–3	Belgium	25–27	16–21	13–21			54–69	Report

==== Leg 4 ====
The tournament was played in City Hall, Nitra, Slovakia.

Date	Time		Score		Set 1	Set 2	Set 3	Set 4	Set 5	Total	Report
4 Jul	16:30	Denmark	0–3	Belgium	16–21	12–21	10–21			38–63	Report
4 Jul	19:00	Slovakia	3–0	Austria	21–18	21–14	21–18			63–50	Report
5 Jul	16:30	Belgium	3–0	Austria	23–21	21–15	21–18			65–54	Report
5 Jul	19:00	Slovakia	3–1	Denmark	21–10	19–21	21–13	21–13		82–57	Report
6 Jul	16:30	Austria	3–1	Denmark	22–20	26–24	18–21	24–22		90–87	Report
6 Jul	19:00	Belgium	3–1	Slovakia	23–25	21–10	21–14	21–18		86–67	Report

=== Pool B ===
Pos	Team	Pld	W	L	Pts	SW	SL	SR	SPW	SPL	SPR	Qualification
1	Czech Republic	12	9	3	27	32	19	1.684	980	926	1.058	Semifinals
2	Montenegro	12	9	3	24	30	17	1.765	921	851	1.082	
3	Spain	12	6	6	20	27	24	1.125	994	961	1.034	
4	Hungary	12	0	12	1	7	36	0.194	724	881	0.822	

==== Leg 1 ====
The tournament was played at Messzi István Sportcsarnok, Kecskemét, Hungary.

Date	Time		Score		Set 1	Set 2	Set 3	Set 4	Set 5	Total	Report
15 Jun	15:30	Spain	1–3	Czech Republic	16–21	21–17	19–21	18–21		74–80	Report
15 Jun	18:00	Hungary	0–3	Montenegro	13–21	15–21	21–23			49–65	Report
16 Jun	15:30	Czech Republic	3–1	Montenegro	15–21	21–15	22–20	21–19		79–75	Report
16 Jun	18:00	Hungary	1–3	Spain	24–22	14–21	17–21	16–21		71–85	Report
17 Jun	15:30	Montenegro	3–1	Spain	21–19	21–19	22–24	21–19		85–81	Report
17 Jun	18:00	Czech Republic	3–1	Hungary	17–21	21–17	21–18	21–16		80–72	Report

==== Leg 2 ====
The tournament was played at Pavelló de la Vall d'Hebron, Barcelona, Spain.

Date	Time		Score		Set 1	Set 2	Set 3	Set 4	Set 5	Total	Report
21 Jun	17:00	Hungary	0–3	Czech Republic	15–21	20–22	15–21			50–64	Report
21 Jun	20:00	Spain	2–3	Montenegro	17–21	21–14	20–22	22–20	8–15	88–92	Report
22 Jun	15:00	Czech Republic	3–1	Montenegro	16–21	21–14	21–14	21–17		79–66	Report
22 Jun	18:00	Spain	3–2	Hungary	21–17	21–19	19–21	20–22	15–13	96–92	Report
23 Jun	15:00	Montenegro	3–0	Hungary	21–12	21–16	21–17			63–45	Report
23 Jun	18:00	Czech Republic	3–2	Spain	21–18	21–12	20–22	16–21	15–13	93–86	Report

==== Leg 3 ====
The tournament was played in Mediteranski Sportski Centar, Budva, Montenegro.

Date	Time		Score		Set 1	Set 2	Set 3	Set 4	Set 5	Total	Report
28 Jun	17:30	Czech Republic	1–3	Spain	30–28	11–21	17–21	19–21		77–91	Report
28 Jun	20:00	Montenegro	3–0	Hungary	21–17	22–20	21–15			64–52	Report
29 Jun	17:30	Czech Republic	3–1	Hungary	21–11	22–20	19–21	21–12		83–64	Report
29 Jun	20:00	Spain	3–1	Montenegro	21–19	24–22	18–21	21–18		84–80	Report
30 Jun	17:30	Hungary	0–3	Spain	16–21	14–21	10–21			40–63	Report
30 Jun	20:00	Montenegro	3–2	Czech Republic	21–16	16–21	18–21	21–18	18–16	94–92	Report

==== Leg 4 ====
The tournament was played in Sports Hall, Opava, Czech Republic.

Date	Time		Score		Set 1	Set 2	Set 3	Set 4	Set 5	Total	Report
5 Jul	15:00	Montenegro	3–1	Spain	18–21	21–17	23–21	21–13		83–72	Report
5 Jul	18:00	Czech Republic	3–1	Hungary	21–16	12–21	21–17	21–15		75–69	Report
6 Jul	15:00	Spain	3–1	Hungary	21–17	22–20	16–21	21–13		80–71	Report
6 Jul	18:00	Montenegro	3–2	Czech Republic	21–13	17–21	21–19	17–21	15–7	91–81	Report
7 Jul	15:00	Hungary	0–3	Montenegro	19–21	15–21	15–21			49–63	Report
7 Jul	18:00	Czech Republic	3–2	Spain	22–20	18–21	21–18	21–23	15–12	97–94	Report

=== Pool C ===
Pos	Team	Pld	W	L	Pts	SW	SL	SR	SPW	SPL	SPR	Qualification
1	Croatia	12	10	2	31	33	12	2.750	920	776	1.186	Semifinals
2	Belarus	12	6	6	17	23	23	1.000	878	883	0.994	
3	Turkey (H)	12	4	8	13	17	26	0.654	778	831	0.936	Semifinals
4	Israel	12	4	8	11	15	27	0.556	745	831	0.897	

(H) Host

==== Leg 1 ====
The tournament was played at Dvorana "Gimnasium", Rovinj, Croatia.

Date	Time		Score		Set 1	Set 2	Set 3	Set 4	Set 5	Total	Report
14 Jun	18:00	Israel	0–3	Croatia	10–21	17–21	17–21			44–63	Report
14 Jun	20:30	Belarus	1–3	Turkey	19–21	17–21	21–19	14–21		71–82	Report
15 Jun	18:00	Croatia	3–1	Turkey	21–15	20–22	21–17	21–18		83–72	Report
15 Jun	20:30	Israel	0–3	Belarus	18–21	18–21	17–21			53–63	Report
16 Jun	18:00	Croatia	3–1	Belarus	21–18	19–21	21–13	21–15		82–67	Report
16 Jun	20:30	Turkey	3–1	Israel	21–13	21–16	15–21	21–14		78–64	Report

==== Leg 2 ====
The tournament was played at Metrowest Sport Palace, Ra'anana, Israel.

Date	Time		Score		Set 1	Set 2	Set 3	Set 4	Set 5	Total	Report
21 Jun	17:00	Israel	3–2	Croatia	18–21	15–21	21–15	24–22	15–10	93–89	Report
21 Jun	19:30	Belarus	3–2	Turkey	21–11	13–21	21–14	17–21	15–11	87–78	Report
22 Jun	17:00	Croatia	1–3	Belarus	18–21	21–19	19–21	18–21		76–82	Report
22 Jun	19:30	Turkey	3–0	Israel	22–20	22–20	21–18			65–58	Report
23 Jun	17:00	Croatia	3–1	Turkey	19–21	21–14	21–13	21–10		82–58	Report
23 Jun	19:30	Israel	3–1	Belarus	22–24	21–17	21–14	21–17		85–72	Report

==== Leg 3 ====
The tournament was played in Cengiz Göllü Volleyball Hall, Bursa, Turkey.

Date	Time		Score		Set 1	Set 2	Set 3	Set 4	Set 5	Total	Report
28 Jun	15:00	Croatia	3–0	Turkey	25–23	21–15	21–13			67–51	Report
28 Jun	17:30	Israel	1–3	Belarus	21–17	17–21	21–23	14–21		73–82	Report
29 Jun	15:00	Turkey	0–3	Israel	18–21	18–21	17–21			53–63	Report
29 Jun	17:30	Belarus	1–3	Croatia	21–12	18–21	19–21	25–27		83–81	Report
30 Jun	14:30	Turkey	1–3	Belarus	22–20	18–21	15–21	17–21		72–83	Report
30 Jun	17:30	Croatia	3–1	Israel	19–21	21–11	21–12	21–15		82–59	Report

==== Leg 4 ====
The tournament was played in SK Olimpiets, Mogilev, Belarus.

Date	Time		Score		Set 1	Set 2	Set 3	Set 4	Set 5	Total	Report
5 Jul	17:00	Croatia	3–0	Israel	25–23	21–10	21–14			67–47	Report
5 Jul	19:30	Turkey	0–3	Belarus	13–21	19–21	22–24			54–66	Report
6 Jul	17:00	Israel	3–0	Belarus	24–22	21–18	21–14			66–54	Report
6 Jul	19:30	Croatia	3–0	Turkey	25–23	21–16	21–13			67–52	Report
7 Jul	17:00	Belarus	1–3	Croatia	17–21	21–18	14–21	16–21		68–81	Report
7 Jul	19:30	Israel	0–3	Turkey	7–21	17–21	16–21			40–63	Report

== Final four ==
The Final Four was held at the Amiral Orhan Aydın Sports Hall in Marmaris, Turkey from July 13 to 14, 2013.

Qualified teams

- Belgium
- Croatia
- Czech Republic
- Turkey (Hosts)

=== Bracket ===
Semi-finals
13 July
Czech Republic	0
Belgium	3
13 July
Turkey	2
Croatia	3

Final
14 July
Belgium	3
Croatia	0
Third place
14 July
Czech Republic	3
Turkey	1

=== Semifinals ===
Date	Time		Score		Set 1	Set 2	Set 3	Set 4	Set 5	Total	Report
13 Jul	15:00	Czech Republic	0–3	Belgium	17–21	18–21	20–22			55–64	Report
13 Jul	18:00	Turkey	2–3	Croatia	15–21	21–10	17–21	21–12	12–15	86–79	Report

=== Third place game ===
Date	Time		Score		Set 1	Set 2	Set 3	Set 4	Set 5	Total	Report
14 Jul	15:00	Czech Republic	3–1	Turkey	21–16	21–19	17–21	21–16		80–72	Report

=== Final ===
Date	Time		Score		Set 1	Set 2	Set 3	Set 4	Set 5	Total	Report
14 Jul	18:00	Belgium	3–0	Croatia	21–14	21–14	21–13			63–41	Report

== Final standing ==
Rank	Team
1st place, gold medalist(s)	Belgium
2nd place, silver medalist(s)	Croatia
3rd place, bronze medalist(s)	Czech Republic
4	Turkey
5	Montenegro
6	Spain
7	Slovakia
8	Belarus
9	Austria
10	Israel
11	Denmark
12	Hungary

Qualified for the 2014 World League Group 2

== Awards ==
- Most valuable player
  (Belgium) Bram Van den Dries
- Best scorer
  (Croatia) Ivan Raič
- Best spiker
  (Czech Republic) Michal Finger
- Best blocker
  (Czech Republic) Tomáš Široký
- Best server
  (Croatia) Tsimafei Zhukouski
- Best setter
  (Belgium) Matthias Valkiers
- Best receiver
  (Czech Republic) Adam Bartos
- Best libero
  (Belgium) Stijn Dejonckheere
