= Pieter Verhees =

Belgian volleyball player (born 1989)

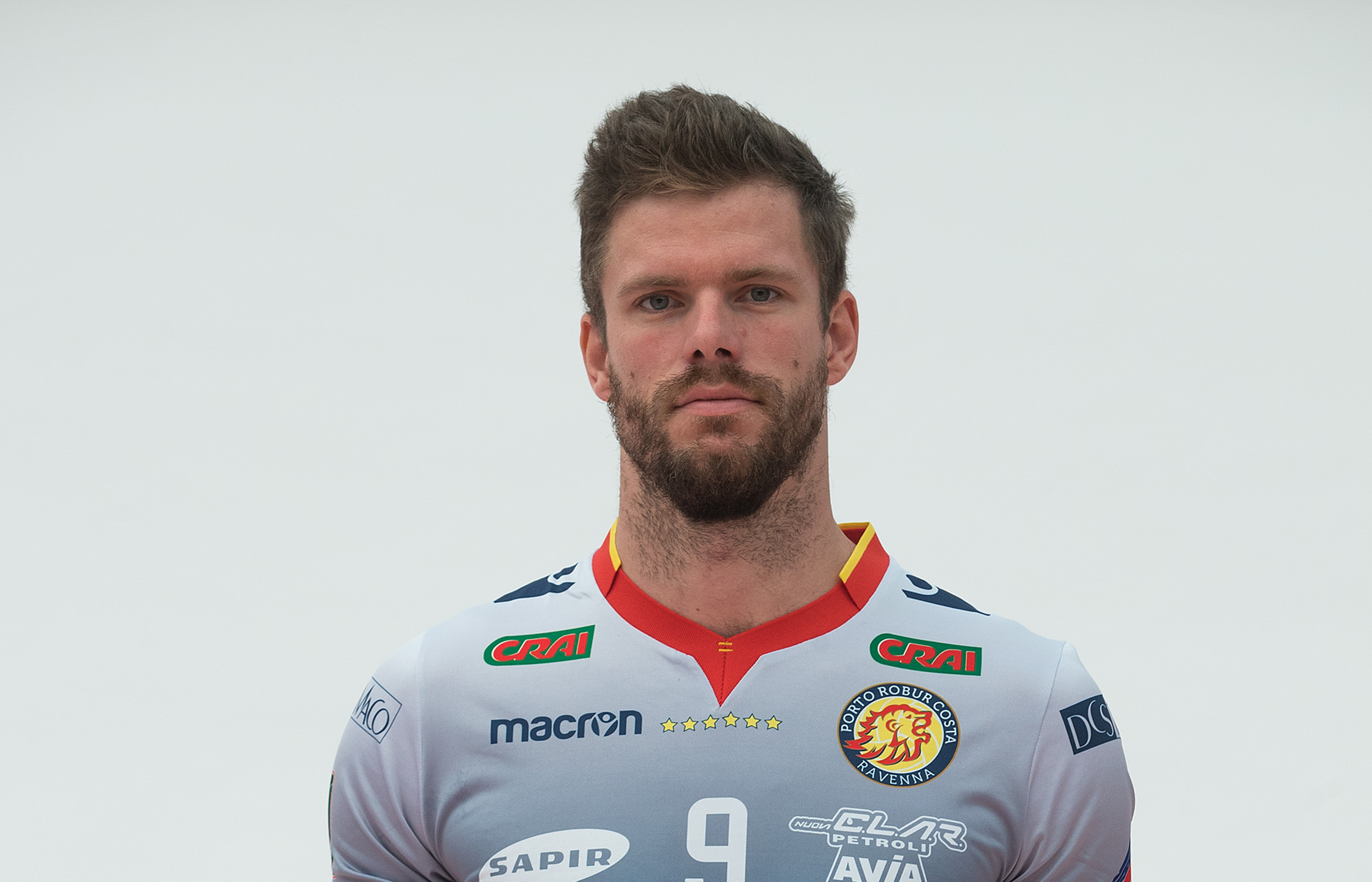

Personal information
- Nationality: (Belgium) Belgian
- Born: 8 December 1989 (age 36); Lommel, Belgium
- Height: 2.05 m (6 ft 9 in)
- Weight: 110 kg (243 lb)
- Spike: 355 cm (140 in)

Volleyball information
- Position: Middle blocker
- Current club: (Belgium) Greenyard Maaseik
- Number: 9

Career
Years	Teams
2006–2008; 2008–2011; 2011–2012; 2012–2014; 2014–2015; 2015–2017; 2017–2018; 2018–2019; 2019–2020; 2020–2021	(Belgium) Noliko Maaseik (Belgium) Euphony Asse-Lennik (Belgium) Noliko Maaseik (Italy) Top Volley Latina (Italy) Modena Volley (Italy) Volley Milano (Italy) Volley Callipo (Italy) Porto Robur Costa (Poland) Warta Zawiercie (Belgium) Greenyard Maaseik

National team
2009–	Belgium

Pieter Verhees (born 8 December 1989) is a Belgian volleyball player, member of the Belgium men's national volleyball team, participant of the 2014 World Championship. On club level he plays for Greenyard Maaseik.

== Personal life ==
Pieter Verhees was born in Lommel and raised in Overpelt, Belgium. In his youth he played basketball, football, karate, etc. but eventually moved to the class with volleyball. Pieter has three younger brothers. He plays on the position of middle blocker. Verhees swapped for the season of 2011–2012, the volleyball team Euphony Asse-Lennik for Noliko Maaseik. After playing there for one year he relocated to Italy to play in Top Volley Latina for 2 years. After this he went to Pallavolo Modena where he won the Italian cup and ended 2nd in competition. The 2 next years, he played for Gi Group Monza, where he became the best middle player of the Italian competition. The Italian adventure continued and Pieter played one more year in Volley Callipo and one in Bunge Ravenna.

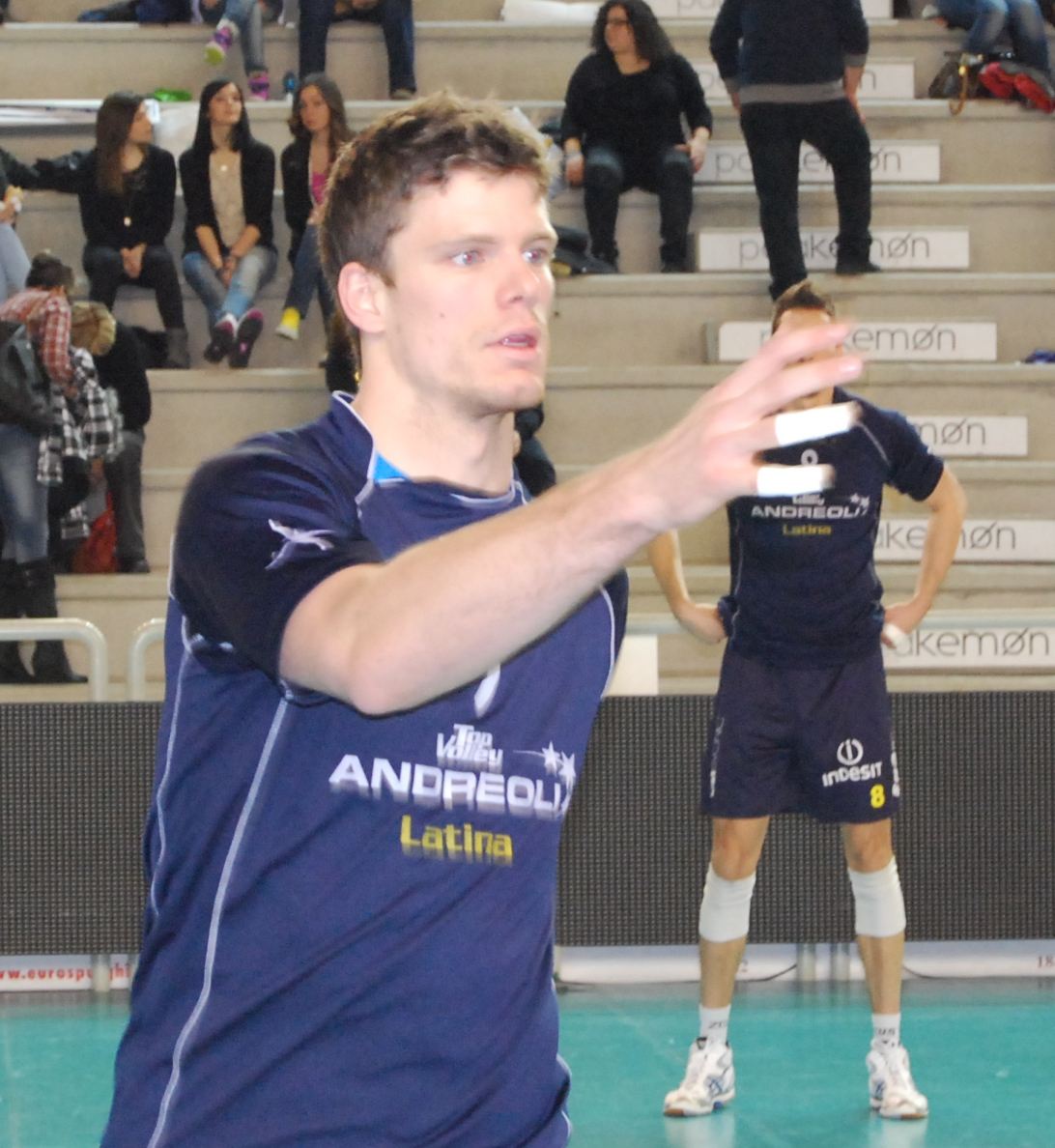
Pieter Verhees in 2012.

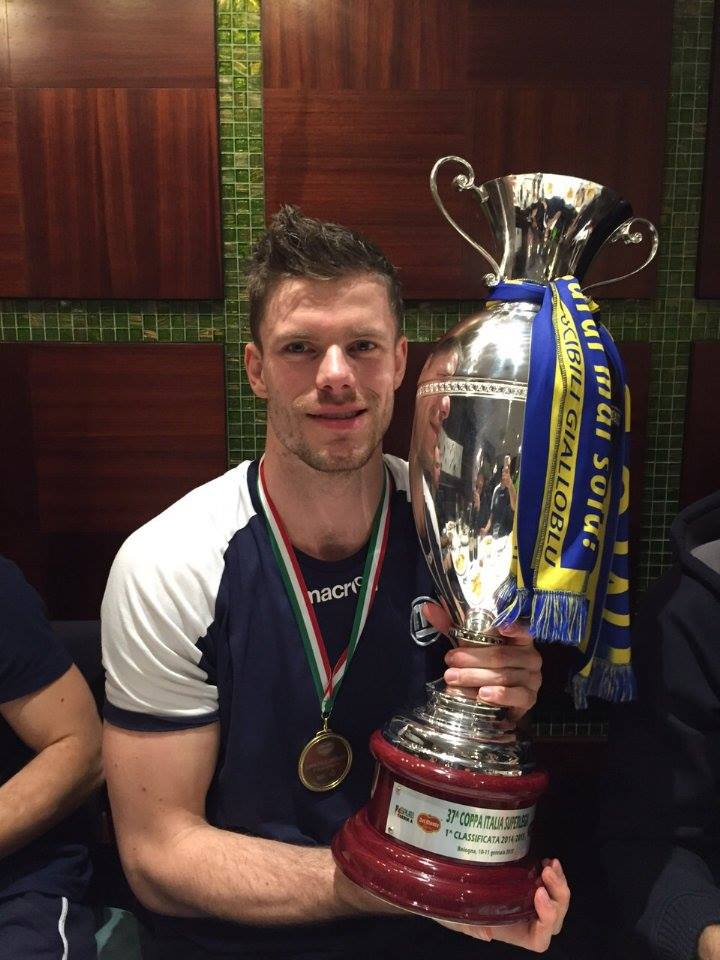
Pieter Verhees after winning the Italian Cup.

== Sporting achievements ==
=== Clubs ===
- CEV Cup
  - 2007/2008 – with Noliko Maaseik
  - 2012/2013 – with Andreoli Latina
- CEV Challenge Cup
  - 2013/2014 – with Andreoli Latina
- National championships
  - 2006/2007 Belgian SuperCup, with Noliko Maaseik
  - 2006/2007 Belgian Cup, with Noliko Maaseik
  - 2006/2007 Belgian Championship, with Noliko Maaseik
  - 2007/2008 Belgian Cup, with Noliko Maaseik
  - 2007/2008 Belgian Championship, with Noliko Maaseik
  - 2010/2011 Belgian Championship, with Euphony Asse-Lennik
  - 2011/2012 Belgian SuperCup, with Noliko Maaseik
  - 2011/2012 Belgian Cup, with Noliko Maaseik
  - 2011/2012 Belgian Championship, with Noliko Maaseik
  - 2014/2015 Italian Cup, with Parmareggio Modena
  - 2014/2015 Italian Championship, with Parmareggio Modena

=== Youth national team ===
- 2007 CEV U19 European Championship
