= Thomas Jaeschke =

American volleyball player (born 1993)

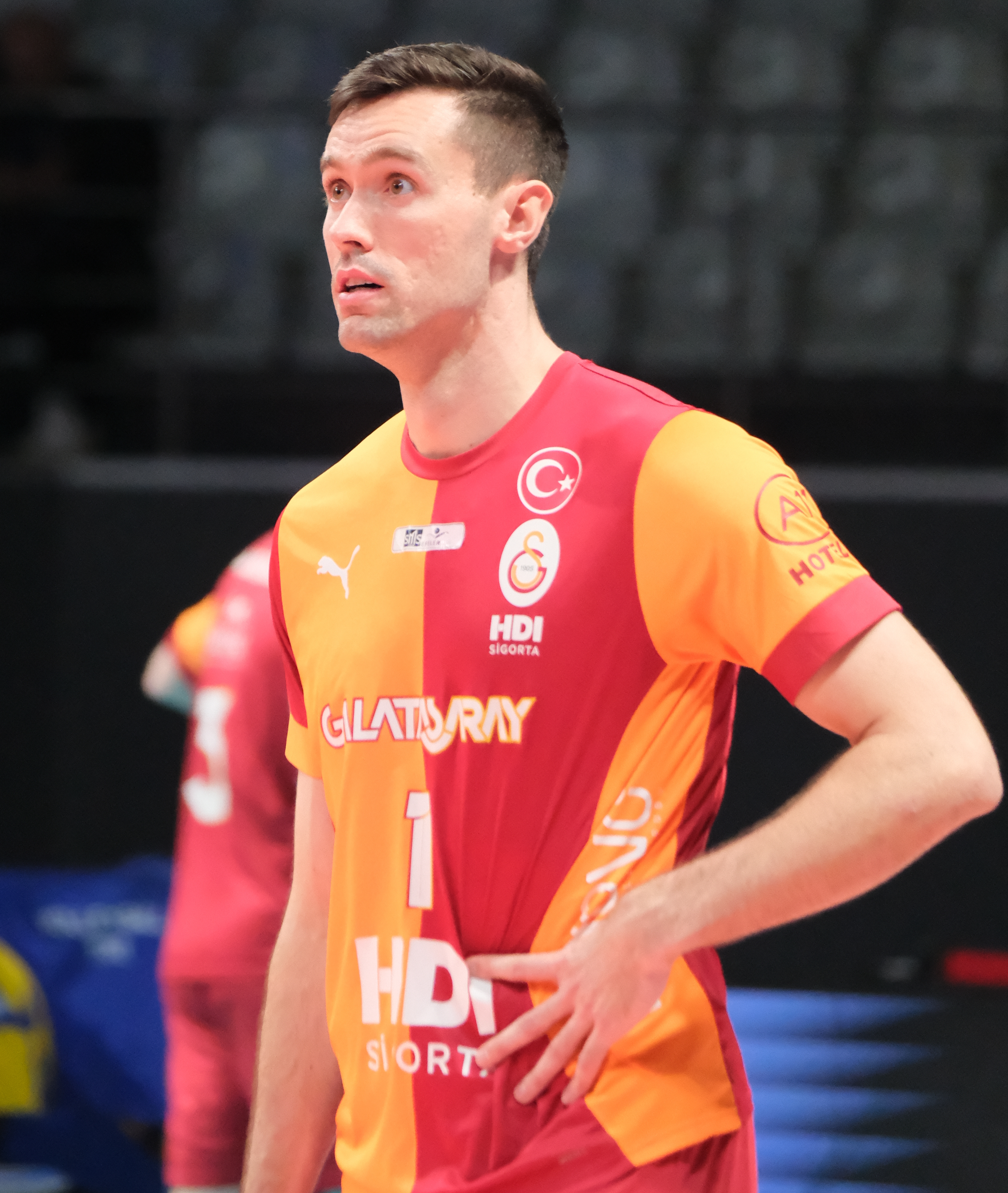
- Jaeschke in 2026

Personal information
- Full name: Thomas John Jaeschke
- Born: September 4, 1993 (age 33) Wheaton, Illinois, U.S.
- Education: Loyola University Chicago
- Height: 6 ft 7 in (2.00 m)
- Weight: 205 lb (93 kg)
- Spike: 139 in (353 cm)
- Block: 130 in (340 cm)

Volleyball information
- Position: Outside hitter

Career
- Years: Team
- 2013–2015 2015–2017 2017–2021 2021–2022 2022–2023 2023 2023–2025 2025–2026 2026–: Loyola Ramblers; Asseco Resovia; Calzedonia Verona; Allianz Milano; Beijing BAIC Motor; Halkbank Ankara; Panasonic Panthers; Galatasaray; Modena Volley

National team
- Years: Team
- 2015–: United States
Medal record
Men's volleyball
Representing United States
Olympic Games
| Bronze medal – third place | 2016 Rio de Janeiro | Team |
| Bronze medal – third place | 2024 Paris | Team |
FIVB World Cup
| Gold medal – first place | 2023 Japan |
| Bronze medal – third place | 2019 Japan |
FIVB Nations League
| Silver medal – second place | 2019 Chicago |
| Silver medal – second place | 2023 Gdańsk |
FIVB World League
| Bronze medal – third place | 2015 Rio de Janeiro |
NORCECA Championship
| Gold medal – first place | 2017 Colorado Springs |
| Gold medal – first place | 2023 Charleston |

Thomas John Jaeschke (/ˈdʒɛʃki/ JESH-kee; born September 4, 1993) is an American professional volleyball player who plays as an outside hitter for Lega Pallavolo Serie A club Modena Volley and the U.S. national team. He won a bronze medal at the Olympic Games Rio 2016 and Paris 2024.

== Early life and education ==
He is the son of John and Danielle Jaeschke. Thomas has a twin sister named Jaime and a brother named Joseph. Jaeschke went to Wheaton-Warrenville South High School and reached the final of the Illinois state championship in 2010 and winning the finals in his senior season in 2012.

Jaeschke was studying finance at Loyola University Chicago, but he interrupted his studies to start his professional career in Asseco Resovia Rzeszów. He went back to college to finish his undergraduate degree during the summer of 2022, therefore missing the 2022 FIVB Volleyball Men's World Championship.

== Career ==
=== College ===
He played for Loyola Ramblers for three seasons; 2013-2015. He reached the semifinals of the 2013 NCAA Men's DI-II National Championship, and won the 2014 and 2015 NCAA Men's DI-II National Championships. He was named to the NCAA All-Tournament Team in 2014 and 2015, and in 2015 he was named AVCA Player of the Year. After his junior year of college, he interrupted his studies to sign a three-year contract with Polish club Asseco Resovia Rzeszów, who were the Polish Champions in the previous season. This was his first professional contract of his career. Jaeschke would later sit out the first half of his second professional season to complete his college degree. In 2017, he moved to Italian club Calzedonia Verona.

=== Europe career ===
He signed a 1–year contract with Galatasaray on July 8, 2025.

=== National team ===
Jaeschke made his debut on the national team during the 2015 NORCECA Champions Cup. He was named to the U.S. national team for the 2015 FIVB World League where the team would capture the bronze medal. He missed competing in the 2015 FIVB World Cup due to injury. Jaeschke was named to the U.S Olympic Men's Volleyball team for the 2016 Olympic Games in Rio de Janeiro, winning a bronze medal, the 2020 Olympic Games in Tokyo, and the 2024 Olympic Games in Paris, winning another bronze medal.

== Honors ==
=== Club ===
- Domestic
  - 2015–16 Polish Championship, with Asseco Resovia
  - 2022–23 Chinese Championship, with Beijing BAIC Motor
  - 2023–24 Japanese Championship, with Panasonic Panthers

=== Individual awards ===
- AVCA National Player of the Year – 2015
- AVCA First-Team All-American – 2014, 2015
- NCAA Championship All-Tournament Team – 2014, 2015
- MIVA Player of the Year – 2014, 2015
- MIVA Freshman of the Year – 2013
- MIVA All-Conference First Team – 2013, 2014, 2015
- MIVA All-Tournament Most Valuable Player – 2015
- MIVA All-Tournament Team – 2013, 2015
- MIVA Academic All-Conference – 2013, 2014, 2015
