= Amiral Orhan Aydın Sports Hall =

Indoor arena in Marmaris, Muğla, Turkey

- Amiral Orhan Aydın Spor Salonu
- Interactive map of Amiral Orhan Aydın Sports Hall
- Location: Marmaris, Muğla Province, Turkey
- Coordinates: 36°51′18″N 28°16′42″E
- Owner: Marmaris Municipality
- Capacity: 1,040

Construction
- Opened: 1999; 27 years ago

The Amiral Orhan Aydın Sports Hall (Turkish: Amiral Orhan Aydın Spor Salonu) is an indoor arena located in Marmaris town of Muğla Province, Turkey. Owned by the Marmaris Municipality, it was opened March 1999. The venue, which is suitable for use of basketball and volleyball competitions, has a seating capacity of 1,040. The venue was renamed in honor of Rear admiral Orhan Aydın, Commander of the Turkish Naval Academy, who died as a result of the 1999 İzmit earthquake at the Turkish Navy headquarters in Gölcük on August 17.

The facility consists of also six tennis courts, a bowling alley, a squash tennis court, a futsal pitch, a fitness center as well as sauna and whirlpool tub for recreation, which are in service since May 2001.

== Major events ==
On July 13–14, the venue hosted the final four events of 2013 Men's European Volleyball League.
