= Bram Van Den Dries =

Belgian volleyball player (born 1989)

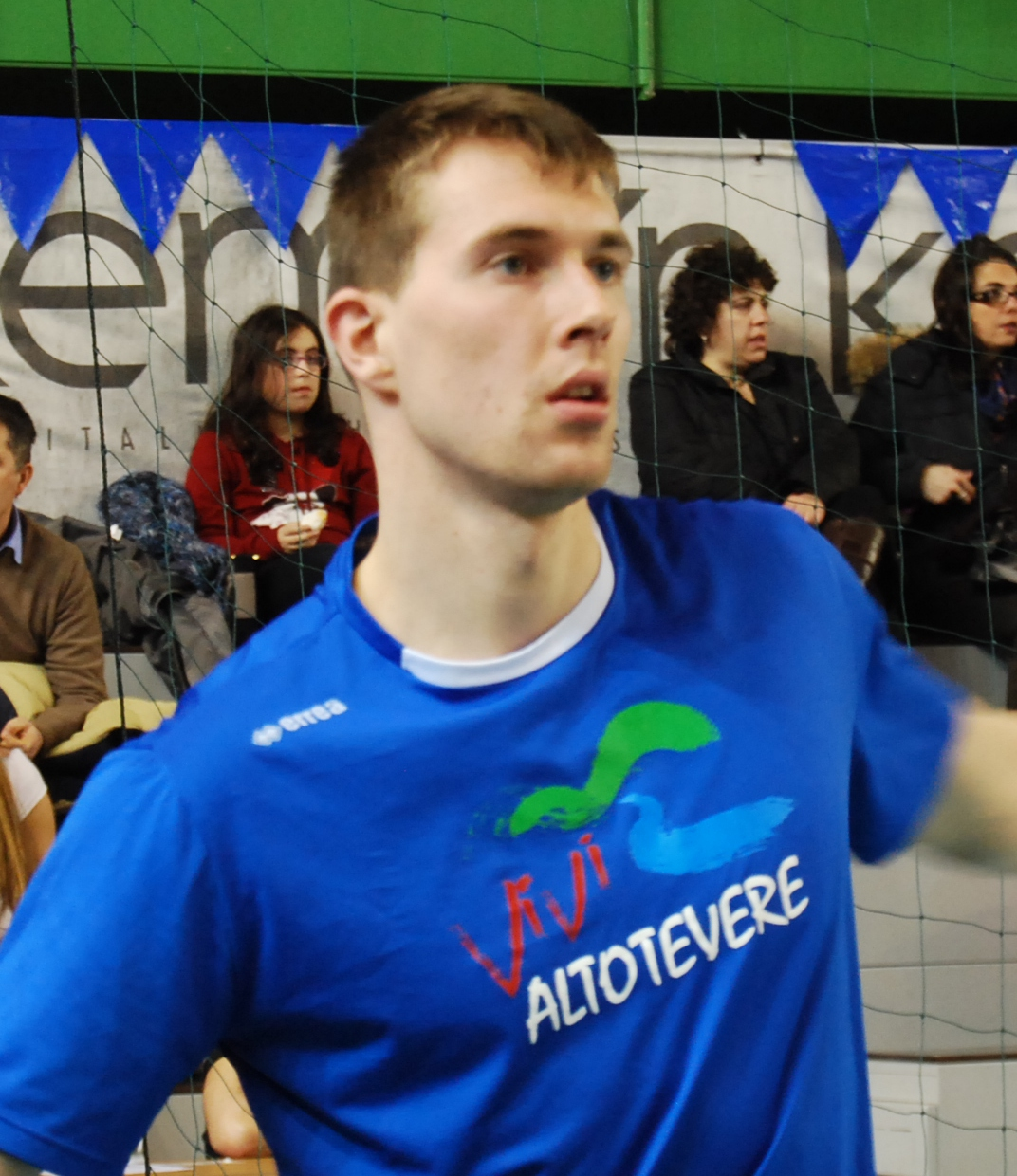
- Van Den Dries with Altotevere in 2012

Personal information
- Nationality: Belgian
- Born: 14 August 1989 (age 37); Herselt, Belgium
- Height: 2.08 m (6 ft 10 in)
- Weight: 99 kg (218 lb)
- Spike: 361 cm (142 in)
- Block: 325 cm (128 in)

Volleyball information
- Position: Opposite
- Current club: Burgan SC

Career
Years	Teams
2005–2007; 2007–2009; 2009–2010; 2010–2011; 2011–2012; 2012–2013; 2013–2014; 2014–2015; 2015–2016; 2016–2017; 2017; 2018; 2018–2019; 2019; 2020–2021; 2021–2022; 2022–2024; 2024–	Mendo Booischot; Topvolley Antwerpen; Top Volley Latina; Umbria Volley; Volley Segrate; Altotevere Volley; Beauvais Oise UC; Maliye Milli Piyango; AZS Olsztyn; Spacer's de Toulouse; Ansan OK Savings Bank; Spacer's de Toulouse; Rennes Volley 35; KB Insurance Stars; PAOK Thessaloniki; Panathinaikos; PAOK Thessaloniki; Burgan SC

National team
2009–	Belgium
Honours
Men's volleyball
Representing Belgium
European League
Gold medal – first place	2013 Turkey

Bram Van Den Dries (born 14 August 1989) is a Belgian professional volleyball player who plays as an opposite spiker for Burgan SC and the Belgium national team. He won a gold medal at the 2013 European League with his national team.

== Honours ==
=== Club ===
- Domestic
  - 2021–22 Greek Championship, with Panathinaikos
  - 2021–22 Greek League Cup, with Panathinaikos
  - 2022–23 Greek Cup, with PAOK Thessaloniki

=== Individual awards ===
- 2007: CEV U19 European Championship – Best scorer
- 2013: European League – Most valuable player
- 2017: French Championship – Best opposite
- 2017: French Championship – Best scorer
- 2019: French Championship – Best opposite
- 2023: Greek Championship – Best scorer
