= Iacopo Botto =

Italian male volleyball player

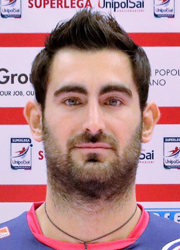

Personal information
- Nationality: Italian
- Born: 22 September 1987 (age 39); La Spezia, Italy
- Height: 1.91 m (6 ft 3 in)
- Weight: 81 kg (179 lb)
- Spike: 332 cm (131 in)
- Block: 310 cm (122 in)

Volleyball information
- Position: Outside spiker
- Current club: Volley Milano
- Number: 1

Career
Teams
	Vero Volley; Volley Milano

National team
2015	Italy

Iacopo Botto (born 22 September 1987) is an Italian male volleyball player. He is part of the Italy men's national volleyball team. On club level he plays for Volley Milano.
