= Volley Milano =

Italian volleyball club

Vero Volley Monza
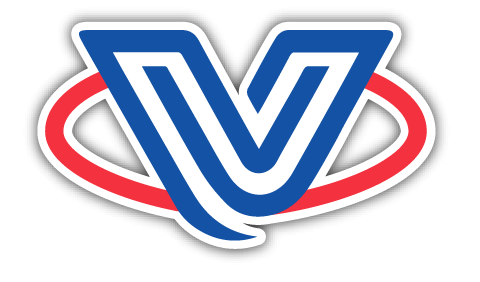
- Full name: Vero Volley Monza
- Founded: 1999
- Ground: Monza Arena (Capacity: 4,500)
- Chairman: Alessandra Marzari
- Manager: Massimo Eccheli
- League: Italian Volleyball League
- Website: Club home page

Uniforms
Home	Away

Volley Milano is an Italian professional men's volleyball club based in Milan that plays in SuperLega.

== Achievements ==
CEV Cup

- (×1) 2022

CEV Challenge Cup

- (silver) (×1) 2024

Italian Championship

- (×1) 2001

Coppa Italia

- (silver) (×1) 2024

== History ==
Volley Milano was founded in 1999 following the separation of a part of the corporate group from Gonzaga Milano from whom it acquires the title sport, starting his racing activities in the 1999–00 season from A2 Series: thanks to the second place in the standings, the team is promoted to Serie A1.

In the 2000–01 season so, Volley Milano makes its debut in the maximum Italian division, obtaining at the end of the regular season fourth in the standings and then coming to the championship final series lost against Sisley Treviso: these results allow the Milanese team to participate for the first time in European competition, namely the 2000-01 CEV Cup, which will be eliminated in the semifinals by Cuneo, then winning the final for third place [2]. In the two following seasons the club always keeps mid-table positions, without going beyond the Scudetto semifinals: in 2003 the first team is melted in Volley Piacenza and now starts from the lower categories.

In 2008 he formed the Vero Volley, a consortium of eight teams operating between Milan and Brianza, who also participates in the Volley Milano: in 2010 the company acquired the sporting title of one of these teams, the Sporting Union Pro Victoria, who had won the championship of B1 series getting the chance to play the A2 Series [1]; in the 2010–11 season the Milanese club then returns in the cadet championship. In the 2012–13 season moves headquarters of play from Milan to Monza, using as a sponsor the name of the consortium, while the following season, after reaching the final in the Italian Cup category, he was promoted to Serie A1, with a victory in the promotion play-off.

== Team ==
Team roster – season 2022/2023

No.	Name	Date of birth	Position
1	(Croatia) Petar Višić	February 11, 1998	setter
2	(Finland) Luka Marttila	June 30, 2003	outside hitter
3	(Italy) Matteo Pirazzoli	October 26, 2000	libero
5	(Italy) Lorenzo Magliano	December 14, 2005	outside hitter
6	(Brazil) Fernando Kreling	January 13, 1996	setter
7	(Italy) Filippo Federici	December 26, 2000	libero
8	(Canada) Stephen Maar	December 6, 1994	outside hitter
9	(Germany) Georg Grozer	November 27, 1984	opposite
11	(Italy) Gianluca Galassi	July 24, 1997	middle blocker
12	(Cuba) Yosvany Hernandez	June 23, 1991	outside hitter
13	(Italy) Thomas Beretta	April 18, 1990	middle blocker
15	(Belarus) Vlad Davyskiba	March 31, 2001	outside hitter
17	(Germany) Jan Zimmermann	December 2, 1993	setter
18	(Italy) Gabriele Di Martino	July 20, 1997	middle blocker
31	(Canada) Arthur Szwarc	March 30, 1995	opposite
Head coach: (Italy) Massimo Eccheli

Team roster – season 2017/2018
No.	Name	Date of birth	Position
1	(Italy) Simone Buti	September 19, 1983	middle blocker
4	(Czech Republic) Donovan Dzavoronok	March 23, 1997	outside hitter
5	(Italy) Davide Brunetti	July 5, 1995	libero
6	(Czech Republic) Michal Finger	September 2, 1993	outside hitter
7	(United States) Kawika Shoji	November 11, 1987	setter
8	(Canada) Brett James Walsh	February 19, 1994	setter
9	(Italy) Marco Rizzo	January 2, 1990	libero
10	(United States) Jake Langlois	May 14, 1992	outside hitter
11	(Italy) Iacopo Botto	September 22, 1987	outside hitter
12	(Italy) Jernej Terpin	June 21, 1996	outside hitter
13	(Italy) Thomas Beretta	April 18, 1990	middle blocker
14	(Italy) Rocco Barone	December 14, 1987	middle blocker
15	(Germany) Simon Hirsch	April 3, 1992	outside hitter
16	(Italy) Federico Mazzai	March 8, 1996	middle blocker
Head coach: Miguel Angel Falasca; Assistant: Francesco Cattaneo

Team roster – season 2016/2017
No.	Name	Date of birth	Position
1	(Germany) Christian Fromm	August 15, 1990	outside hitter
2	(Croatia) Ivan Raič	June 3, 1989	outside hitter
4	(Czech Republic) Donovan Dzavoronok	March 23, 1997	outside hitter
5	(Italy) Nicola Daldello	May 6, 1983	setter
6	(Italy) Andrea Galliani	January 6, 1988	outside hitter
7	(Italy) Marco Rizzo	January 2, 1990	libero
8	(Italy) Marcello Forni^{1}	August 11, 1980	middle blocker
9	(Serbia) Nikola Jovović	February 13, 1992	setter
10	(Italy) Jernej Terpin	June 21, 1996	outside hitter
11	(Italy) Iacopo Botto	September 22, 1987	outside hitter
12	(Belgium) Pieter Verhees	December 8, 1989	middle blocker
13	(Italy) Thomas Beretta	April 18, 1990	middle blocker
15	(Germany) Simon Hirsch	April 3, 1992	outside hitter
16	(Brazil) Leandro Vissotto^{2}	April 30, 1983	opposite
17	(Italy) Davide Brunetti	July 5, 1995	libero
Head coach: Miguel Angel Falasca; Assistant: Francesco Cattaneo^{1} Marcello Forni left the club on December 22, 2016.^{2} Leandro Vissotto joined the club on January 13, 2017.
