= Simon Hirsch =

German volleyball player (born 1992)

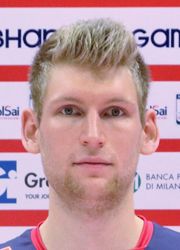

Personal information
- Nationality: German
- Born: 3 April 1992 (age 34); Ulm, Germany
- Height: 2.04 m (6 ft 8 in)
- Weight: 96 kg (212 lb)
- Spike: 352 cm (139 in)
- Block: 344 cm (135 in)

Volleyball information
- Position: Opposite
- Current club: Volley Milano
- Number: 15

Career
Years	Teams
2014–	Gi Group Monza

National team
2014–	Germany
Honours
Men's volleyball
Representing Germany
European Championship
Silver medal – second place	2017 Poland

Simon Hirsch (born 3 April 1992) is a German male volleyball player. He is part of the Germany men's national volleyball team. On the club level he plays for Gi Group Monza.

== Sporting achievements ==
=== National team ===
- 2017 European Championship
