= Hebei Agricultural University =

Agricultural school in Baoding, China

Coordinates: 38.850966°N 115.490352°E

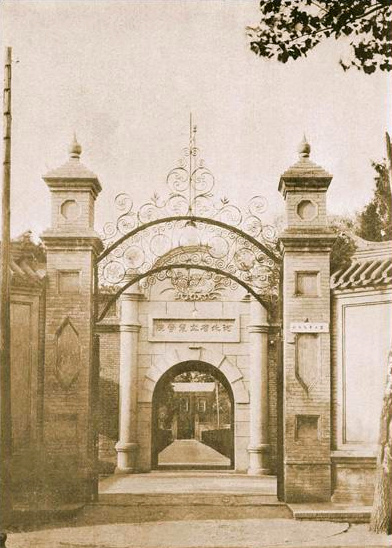
The Gate (1931), Agricultural University of Hebei.

Hebei Agricultural University (Chinese: 河北农业大学; pinyin: Héběi Nóngyè Dàxué), also known as the Agricultural University of Hebei, is a public comprehensive university with the focus on areas of agriculture and forestry, engineering, and life sciences. It was jointly established by the province and the ministry in Baoding, Hebei Province, the People's Republic of China.
