= Yosvany Hernandez =

Cuban volleyball player (born 1991)

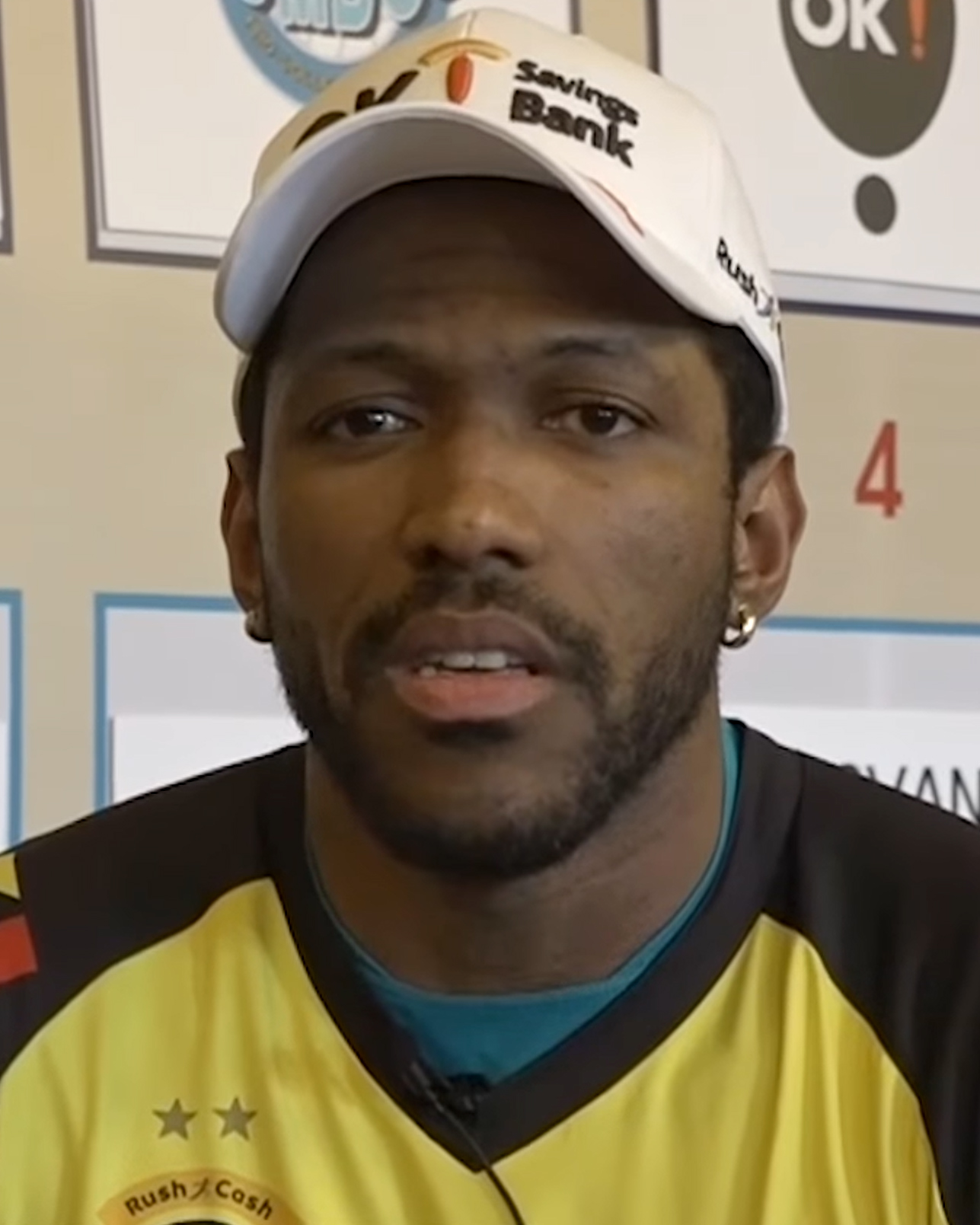
- Hernandez in 2018

Personal information
- Full name: Yosvany Hernandez Carbonell
- Nationality: Cuban
- Born: 23 June 1991 (age 35)
- Height: 201 cm (6 ft 7 in)
- Weight: 90 kg (198 lb)
- Spike: 3.60 m (142 in)
- Block: 3.38 m (133 in)

Volleyball information
- Position: Outside spiker
- Current club: (Italy) Vero Volley Monza
- Number: 14

Career
- Years: Team
- 2012–2014 2014–2015 2015–2016 2016–2017 2017–2018 2018–2019 2019 2020 2020 2021–2022 2022–2023 2023–: (Belarus) Stroitiel Mińsk (Saudi Arabia) Al-Hilal (Indonesia) Pertamina (Egypt) Tala'ea El-Gaish (Turkey) Beşiktaş (South Korea) Ansan OK Savings Bank (South Korea) Cheonan Hyundai Capital (Turkey) Haliliye Belediyespor (South Korea) Incheon Korean Air (Egypt) Zamalek SC Volleyball (China) Beijing BAIC Motor (Italy) Vero Volley Monza

National team
- Years: Team
- 2010: Cuba

Yosvany Hernandez Carbonell (born 23 June 1991) is a Cuban male volleyball player. He was part of the Cuba men's national volleyball team at the 2010 FIVB World League. On club level he plays for Vero Volley Monza in Italian Volleyball League.
