= Artur Udrys =

Belarusian volleyball player (born 1990)

Personal information
- Nationality: Belarusian
- Born: 18 October 1990 (age 36); Riga, Latvia
- Height: 2.11 m (6 ft 11 in)
- Weight: 99 kg (218 lb)
- Spike: 368 cm (145 in)

Volleyball information
- Position: Opposite / Middle blocker

Career
Years	Teams
2009–2013; 2013–2014; 2014–2015; 2015–2016; 2016–2017; 2017–2018; 2018–2019; 2019–2020; 2020–2021; 2021–2022; 2022; 2023; 2023; 2024	Stroitel Minsk; Shakhtior Soligorsk; AZS Częstochowa; Kristall Voronezh; Gumi KB Insurance Stars; Guangdong Shenzhen; Fakel Novy Urengoy; Projekt Warsaw; Tours VB; PAOK Thessaloniki; Jiangsu Nanjing BS Maomao; Akkuş Belediyespor; VC Atyrau; Hebei Baoding

National team
2010–	Belarus

Artur Udrys (Latvian: Artūrs Ūdris; Belarusian: Артур Удрыс; Russian: Артур Удрис; born 18 October 1990) is a Belarusian professional volleyball player of Latvian descent.

== Honours ==
=== Clubs ===
- National championships
  - 2009/2010 Belarusian Cup, with Stroitel Minsk
  - 2009/2010 Belarusian Championship, with Stroitel Minsk
  - 2010/2011 Belarusian Cup, with Stroitel Minsk
  - 2010/2011 Belarusian Championship, with Stroitel Minsk
  - 2011/2012 Belarusian Championship, with Stroitel Minsk
  - 2012/2013 Belarusian Cup, with Stroitel Minsk
  - 2012/2013 Belarusian Championship, with Stroitel Minsk
