= Nina Stojiljković =

French volleyball player

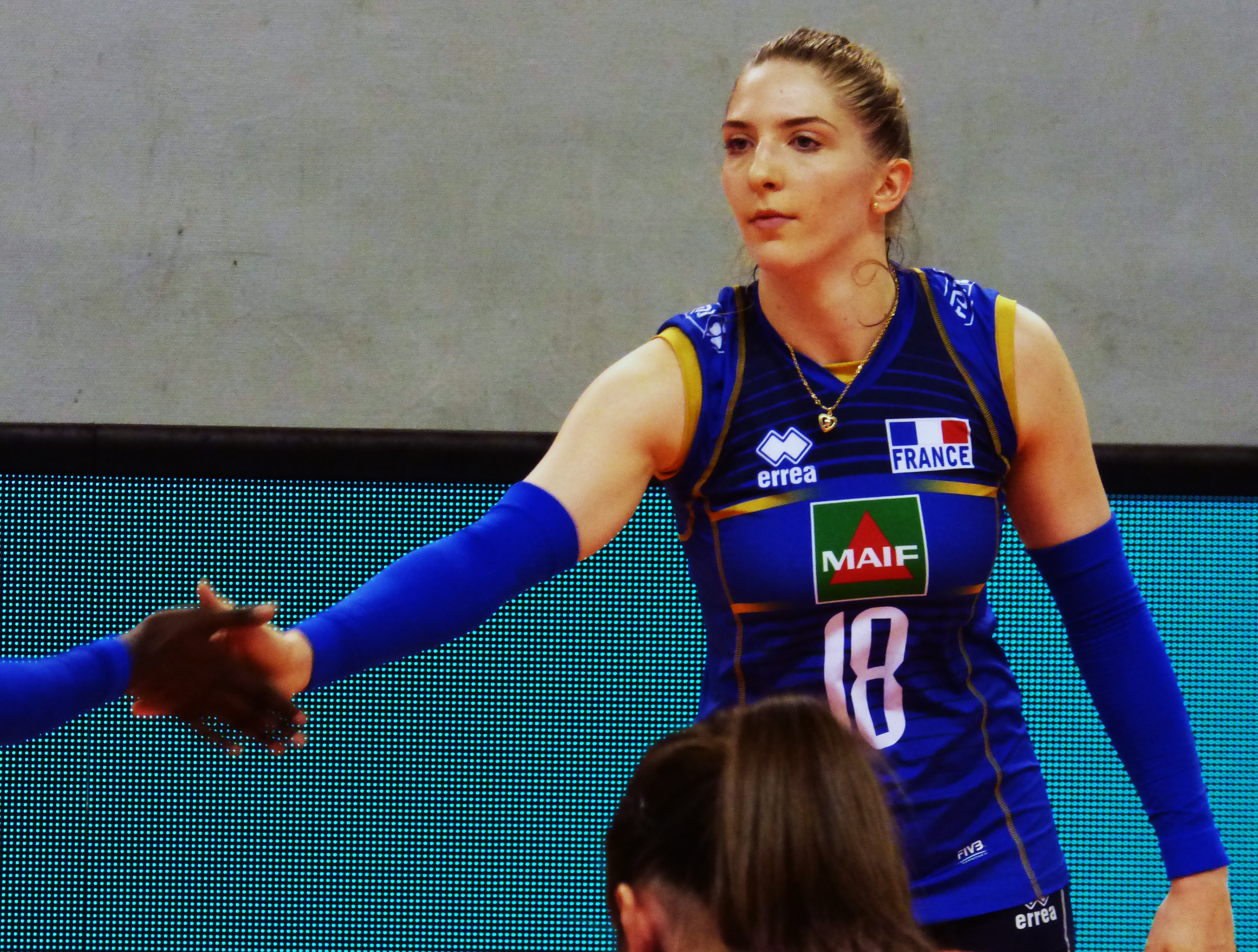
- Stojiljković in 2018

Personal information
- Nationality: French
- Born: September 1, 1996 (age 30); Paris, France
- Height: 1.79 m (5 ft 10 in)
- Spike: 285 cm (112 in)
- Block: 275 cm (108 in)

Volleyball information
- Position: Setter
- Number: 9 (national team)

Career
| Years | Teams |
|---|---|
| 2013–2014; 2014–2017; 2017–2018; 2018–2019; 2019–2020; 2020–2021; 2021–2022; 2022; 2022–2023; 2023; 2023–2024; 2024-2025; 2025– | (France) Institut fédéral de volley-ball (France) VB Nantes (France) Stade Français Paris St Cloud (France) Quimper Volley 29 (Slovenia) Nova KBM Branik (France) Stade Français Paris St Cloud (France) Volero Le Cannet (Serbia) ŽOK Partizan (Slovenia) Calcit Volley (Romania) Dinamo Bucuresti (Turkey) Çukurova Belediyesi Spor Kulübü (Turkey) Aydın Büyükşehir Belediyespor (Greece) ZAON Kifissia |
Medal record
Challenger Cup
| Gold medal – first place | 2023 Laval | Team |
European Volleyball League
| Gold medal – first place | 2022 Orléans |
Savaria Cup
| Gold medal – first place | 2019 Szombathely |
Tournoi de France
| Silver medal – second place | 2022 Belfort/Chaumont/Sélestat/Metz |

Nina Stojiljković (Serbian Cyrillic: Нина Стојиљковић; born 1 September 1996 in Paris) is a Serbian-French professional volleyball player of the France women's national volleyball team. Stojiljković won with the national team European Golden League, FIVB Challenger Cup and was part of the team when it made its Olympic debut.

== Awards ==
=== National team ===
- 2019 Savaria Cup – Gold Medal
- 2022 Women's European Volleyball League – Gold Medal
- 2022 Tournoi de France – Silver Medal
- 2023 Challenger Cup – Gold Medal

=== Club ===
- 2022 French championship – Champion, with Volero Le Cannet
- 2015/16 French cup – Runner-Up, with Volleyball Nantes
- 2021/22 French cup – Champion, with Volero Le Cannet
- 2018/20 MEVZA League – Runner-Up, with Nova KBM Branik
- 2019/20 Slovenian championship – Runner-Up, with Nova KBM Branik
- 2019/20 Slovenian cup – Champion, with Nova KBM Branik

=== Individual Awards (awarded) ===
==== National team ====
- European Golden League 2022 – Best setter

==== Club ====
- Slovenian Cup 2019/20 – Best setter

=== Individual Awards (not awarded) ===
==== National team ====
- FIVB Challenger Cup 2023 – Best setter
- FIVB Challenger Cup 2023 – Best server
