= Yugoslavia Women's Volleyball Cup =

Volleyball in Yugoslavia

- Sport: Volleyball
- Founded: 1959
- Folded: 1991
- Administrator: YVF
- Country: Yugoslavia
- Continent: Europe
- Last champion: OK Crvena Zvezda (10th title)
- Most titles: OK Crvena Zvezda (10 titles)
- Website: http://www.ossrb.org/

The Yugoslavian Women's Volleyball Cup was a women's volleyball cup held between the year 1959 and 1991 in Yugoslavia managed by the Yugoslavian Socialist Republic Volleyball Federation.

== Competition history ==
The competition Started in 1959 and 6 season played until 1964 when the competition stopped for almost 8 years and resumed again in 1971 and finally reached its last season 1991 due to the dissolution of the state of Yugoslavia.

== Winners list ==
| Years | Winners | Score | Runners-up |
|---|---|---|---|
| 1959 | Partizan Belgrade | | |
| 1960 | Partizan Belgrade | | |
| 1960- 61 | OK Crvena Zvezda | | |
| 1961 | OK Crvena Zvezda | | |
| 1962 | OK Crvena Zvezda | | |
| 1963 | DTV Partizan Klek | | |
| 1964- 71 | Not Played | | |
| 1972 | OK Crvena Zvezda | | |
| 1973 | Partizan Rijeka | | |
| 1974 | OK Crvena Zvezda | 3 - 0 (15-9, 15-10, 15-2) | Radnički Beograd |
| 1975 | ŽOK Rijeka | 3 - 1 (14-16, 15-6, 15-12, 15-6) | Radnički Beograd |
| 1976 | OK Crvena Zvezda | Round-robin | Radnički Beograd |
| 1977 | ŽOK Rijeka | Round-robin | Radnički Beograd |
| 1978 | ŽOK Rijeka | Round-robin | ŽOK Vukovar |
| 1979 | OK Crvena Zvezda | Round-robin | Radnički Beograd |
| 1980 | Radnički Beograd | Round-robin | OK Crvena Zvezda |
| 1981 | HAOK Mladost | Round-robin | ŽOK Vukovar |
| 1982 | OK Crvena Zvezda | Round-robin | Paloma Branik |
| 1983 | OK Crvena Zvezda | Round-robin | Paloma Branik |
| 1984 | Mladost Monter | Round-robin | Paloma Branik |
| 1985 | Mladost Monter | Round-robin | Paloma Branik |
| 1986 | Mladost Monter | Round-robin | OK Crvena Zvezda |
| 1987 | Radnički Beograd | Round-robin | Paloma Branik |
| 1988 | Mladost Monter | Round-robin | Paloma Branik |
| 1989 | Mladost Monter | Round-robin | Paloma Branik |
| 1990 | Mladost Monter | Round-robin | Paloma Branik |
| 1991 | OK Crvena Zvezda | Round-robin | ŽOK Modriča |
