= Boris Buša =

Serbian volleyball player (born 1997)

Personal information
- Nationality: Serbian
- Born: 25 April 1997 (age 29); Vrbas, Serbia, FR Yugoslavia
- Height: 200 cm (6 ft 7 in)
- Weight: 97 kg (214 lb)
- Spike: 330 cm (130 in)
- Block: 320 cm (126 in)

Volleyball information
- Position: Opposite
- Current club: (Croatia) HAOK Mladost Zagreb
- Number: 11

Career
Years	Teams
2014-2017; 2017-2019; 2019-2021; 2021-	(Serbia) OK Partizan Belgrade (Serbia) Mladi Radnik Požarevac (Serbia) OK Vojvodina Novi Sad (Croatia) HAOK Mladost Zagreb

Boris Buša (born 25 April 1997) is a Serbian volleyball player, playing in position opposite.

His older sister, Bianka, is also a volleyball player.

== Clubs ==
Serbia Super Cup:

- 2019, 2020

Serbia Cup:

- 2020

Championship of Serbia:

- 2020, 2021

Central European League - MEVZA:

- 2022

Croatian Cup:

- 2022

Championship of Croatia:

- 2022
