= Gordana Jurcan =

Croatian volleyball player

Personal information
- Born: 1 May 1971 (age 55); Pula, SR Croatia, SFR Yugoslavia
- Height: 1.91 m (6 ft 3 in)
- Weight: 71 kg (157 lb)

Career
Years	Teams
1983–1988; 1988–2001	ŽOK Poreč; ŽOK Rijeka

National team
Croatia
Honours
Women's volleyball
Representing Croatia
Mediterranean Games
Gold medal – first place	1993 Languedoc-Roussillon
European Championship
Silver medal – second place	1995 Netherlands

Gordana Jurcan (born 1 May 1971) is a retired Croatian female volleyball player. She was a member of the Croatia women's national volleyball team. Jurcan was part of the Croatian national team at the 1993 Mediterranean Games in Languedoc-Roussillon, at the 1995 European Championship in the Netherlands, at the 1995 World Cup in Japan, and at the 2000 Summer Olympics in Sydney. With ŽOK Rijeka she won two Croatian Leagues, in 1999 and 2000, and four Croatian Cups, in 1992, 1999, 2000 and 2001.

== Career ==
Jurcan was born in Pula, Croatia. She started playing at 12 with local club ŽOK Poreč. When she was still in the kadeti of her club, she started playing for the first team. Her talent was quickly noted, and several top teams tried to bring her to their club. She eventually chose Rijeka, and played there for the rest of her career. She was one of the fundamental players of Rijeka for many years, as well as the "captain in the real sense of the word."

With Rijeka she won the 1999 and 2000 Croatian Leagues, and the 1992, 1999, 2000, and 2001 Croatian Cups.

She played both for Yugoslavia and Croatia at a youth level. After the fall of Yugoslavia, she started playing for Croatia, and in 1992 became a standard player in the Croatian national team. With Croatia, she played at the 1993 Mediterranean Games, winning the gold medal. She won the silver medal at the 1995 European Championship in the Netherlands. In the same year, she also took part with Croatia in the 1995 World Cup, finishing fourth.

She competed with the national team at the 2000 Summer Olympics in Sydney, Australia, finishing 7th.

Jurcan retired in 2001. Five years later, she started training the youth academy of HAOK Rijeka.

== Clubs ==
- (Croatia) ŽOK Poreč (1987–1988)
- (Croatia) ŽOK Rijeka (1988–2001)

== Sporting achievements ==
=== Clubs ===
==== National championships ====
- 1992/1993 Croatian Championship, with ŽOK Rijeka
- 1993/1994 Croatian Championship, with ŽOK Rijeka
- 1995/1996 Croatian Championship, with ŽOK Rijeka
- 1996/1997 Croatian Championship, with ŽOK Rijeka
- 1998/1999 Croatian Championship, with ŽOK Rijeka
- 1999/2000 Croatian Championship, with ŽOK Rijeka

National cups

- 1991/1992 Croatian Cup, with ŽOK Rijeka
- 1992/1993 Croatian Cup, with ŽOK Rijeka
- 1994 Croatian Cup, with ŽOK Rijeka
- 1995 Croatian Cup, with ŽOK Rijeka
- 1996 Croatian Cup, with ŽOK Rijeka
- 1997 Croatian Cup, with ŽOK Rijeka
- 1999 Croatian Cup, with ŽOK Rijeka
- 2000 Croatian Cup, with ŽOK Rijeka
- 2001 Croatian Cup, with ŽOK Rijeka

=== National team ===
- 1993 Mediterranean Games
- 1995 CEV European Championship
- 1995 FIVB World Cup

== See also ==
- Croatia at the 2000 Summer Olympics
