= Nikolina Kovačić =

Croatian volleyball player

Personal information
- Full name: Nikolina Kovačić
- Nationality: Croatian
- Born: April 30, 1986 (age 40); Rijeka, SR Croatia, SFR Yugoslavia
- Hometown: Rijeka, Croatia
- Height: 1.80 m (5 ft 11 in)
- Weight: 74 kg (163 lb)
- Spike: 300 cm (120 in)
- Block: 280 cm (110 in)

Volleyball information
- Position: Outside hitter
- Current club: Rota Koleji
- Number: 14

National team
2011 -	Croatia
- Last updated: December 2013

Nikolina Kovačić (born April 30, 1986) is a Croatian volleyball player. She played with the national team the 2011 European Championships finishing in the 5th place. She two times played the CEV Champions League and the Top Teams Cup, and five with the CEV Cup with Croatian club ŽOK Rijeka.

Kovačić won the Croatian League three times and five times the Croatian Cup, all with ŽOK Rijeka.

== Personal information ==
Kovačić is 180 cm (5 ft 11 in) tall 74 kilograms (163 lb), born on April 30, 1986, in Rijeka (then SR Croatia, SFR Yugoslavia). She earned a Master's degree in Management from University of Rijeka's Faculty of Tourism and Hospitality Management.

== Career ==
=== 1997-2008 ===
Kovačić played with the Croatian club in her native city ŽOK Rijeka from 1997 to 2000 in second division, then played from 2000 to 2008 the top Croatian volleyball category with the same club. There she played two times the CEV Champions League, in 2000-01 and the 2007-08 Indesit European Champions League. She also played the 2001–02 and 2006-07 Top Teams Cup and the CEV Cup from 2001 to 2006. Kovačić won the Cup and the League bronze medal during the 2004/05 season, the 2005/06 Cup and the League silver medal and the Croatian League and Cup title in 2007 with ŽOK Rijeka led by the head coach Igor Lovrin. She and her team repeated the same success in 2008, winning again the Cup and the League. She then played with the Swiss club Voléro Zürich.

=== 2009-2011 ===
In 2009 the Spanish club Oxidoc Palma head coach Pascual Saurín, requested Kovačić to play for his team. She was one of the main powers of her club in reception and offensive with Vesna Jovanovic and Vita Prychepa, being chosen among the ideal 7 in the 7th round. After mid season, Oxidoc Palma suffered a financial crisis and Kovačić and all foreign players left the club. She then signed with Ştiinţa Bacău in early 2010 from the Romanian League, leading the team to secure a semifinals spot. But finally claiming a fourth-place position. For the 2010/11 season, Kovačić moved to the second division Italian club Infotel Forlì with a one-year agreement. But after a difficult mid season, being close to relegation, the club released her and libero player Martina Boscoscur.

=== 2011-2012 ===
She started the 2011 playing with the German club 1. VC Wiesbaden. Not playing in CEV Cup. Kovacic joined her national team to play the 2011 European League, ranking with her team in 11th place. After the Russian club Leningradka, the team asked her to sign an amendment five days before the first league match, asking that she would have to withdraw the 30% of the contract amount if she could not play five days after suffering any injury. She refused such agreement and returned home to play with her native Croatian ŽOK Rijeka. Soon after that, she played the 2011 European Championship with her national team, placing in 13th place. Kovačić then joined the German club VfB 91 Suhl just before the end of the transfer time in January 2012. She could not play the 2011 GM Capital Challenge Cup matches with VfB, because she previously played with Croatian club. and she helped to stabilize the club's bad start. helping to reach the German Volleyball League semifinals.

=== 2012-2013 ===
Kovačić played the Olympic European qualification tournament in Ankara, Turkey with her national team. But her team finished with a 0–3 record in pool play after being defeated by Bulgaria in the last match and not qualified for the 2012 Summer Olympics. After moving from one German team to another, she joined a group of foreigners in Alemannia Aachen with the goal of qualifying the club to European competitions. While playing with Alemannia Aachen, she was selected among the most popular Croatian sportspersons living abroad, later expressing that she would like to play in the 2016 Summer Olympics. The Turkish second division club Rota Koleji signed Kovačić to play the 2013/14 season, as the only foreigner, as the league guidelines states.

== Beach volleyball ==
Kovačić won the bronze medal at the 2006 Sony Ericsson Cup, playing with Dalida Vernier.

== Clubs ==
- (Croatia) ŽOK Rijeka (2000-2008)
- (Switzerland) Voléro Zürich (2008-2009)
- (Spain) Oxidoc Palma (2009-2010)
- (Romania) Stiinta Bacau (2010)
- (Italy) Infotel Forlì (2010-2011)
- (Germany) 1. VC Wiesbaden (2011)
- (Croatia) ŽOK Rijeka (2011-2012)
- (Germany) VfB 91 Suhl (2012)
- (Germany) Alemannia Aachen (2012-2013)
- (Turkey) Rota Koleji (2013-2014)

== Awards ==
=== Beach volleyball ===
- 2006 Sony Ericsson Cup - Bronze Medal

=== Clubs ===
- 2000-01 Croatian League - Champion, with ŽOK Rijeka
- 2003-04 Croatian League - Bronze Medal, with ŽOK Rijeka
- 2004-05 Croatian Cup - Champion, with ŽOK Rijeka
- 2004-05 Croatian League - Bronze Medal, with ŽOK Rijeka
- 2005-06 Croatian Cup - Champion, with ŽOK Rijeka
- 2005-06 Croatian League - Runner-Up, with ŽOK Rijeka
- 2006-07 Croatian Cup - Champion, with ŽOK Rijeka
- 2006-07 Croatian League - Champion, with ŽOK Rijeka
- 2007-08 Croatian Cup - Champion, with ŽOK Rijeka
- 2007-08 Croatian League - Champion, with ŽOK Rijeka
- 2008-09 Swiss League - Bronze Medal, with Voléro Zürich
