= Alen Šket =

Slovenian volleyball player

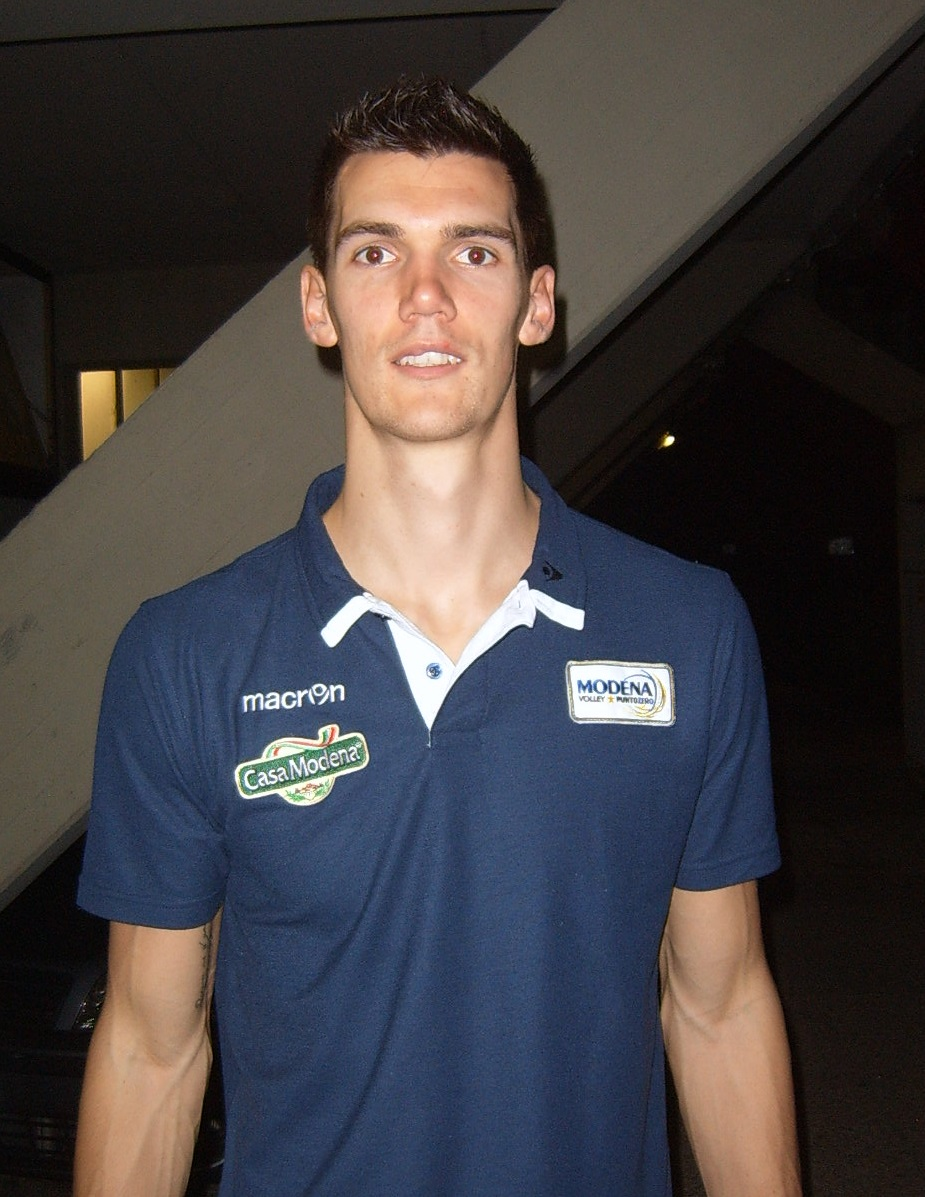
- Šket in 2013

Personal information
- Nationality: Slovenian
- Born: 28 March 1988 (age 38); Slovenj Gradec, SFR Yugoslavia
- Height: 2.05 m (6 ft 9 in)
- Weight: 92 kg (203 lb)
- Spike: 358 cm (141 in)
- Block: 335 cm (132 in)

Volleyball information
- Position: Outside hitter
- Current club: ACH Volley

Career
Years	Teams
2006–2008; 2008–2013; 2013–2014; 2014–2015; 2015–2016; 2016–2018; 2018–2019; 2020; 2020–2021; 2021–	OK Maribor; ACH Volley; Modena Volley; Pallavolo Molfetta; Top Volley Latina; Fenerbahçe İstanbul; Halkbank Ankara; Afyon Belediye Yüntaş; Merkur Maribor; ACH Volley

National team
2006–	Slovenia
Medal record
Men's volleyball
Representing Slovenia
FIVB Challenger Cup
Gold medal – first place	2019 Slovenia	Team
CEV European Championship
Silver medal – second place	2015 Bulgaria/Italy	Team
Silver medal – second place	2019 France/Slovenia/Belgium/Netherlands	Team
Silver medal – second place	2021 Poland/Czech Republic/Estonia/Finland	Team
European League
Gold medal – first place	2015 Poland	Team
Bronze medal – third place	2011 Slovakia	Team
Mediterranean Games
Bronze medal – third place	2009 Pescara	Team

Alen Šket (born 28 March 1988) is a Slovenian volleyball player who plays for ACH Volley. He is also a member of the Slovenia national team.

== Honours ==
- 2008–09 Slovenian Cup, with ACH Volley
- 2008–09 Slovenian Championship, with ACH Volley
- 2009–10 Slovenian Cup, with ACH Volley
- 2009–10 Slovenian Championship, with ACH Volley
- 2010–11 Slovenian Cup, with ACH Volley
- 2010–11 Slovenian Championship, with ACH Volley
- 2011–12 Slovenian Cup, with ACH Volley
- 2011–12 Slovenian Championship, with ACH Volley
- 2012–13 Slovenian Cup, with ACH Volley
- 2012–13 Slovenian Championship, with ACH Volley
- 2016–17 Turkish Cup, with Fenerbahçe İstanbul
- 2017–18 Turkish SuperCup, with Fenerbahçe İstanbul
- 2018–19 Turkish SuperCup, with Halkbank Ankara
- 2020–21 Slovenian Championship, with Merkur Maribor
- 2021–22 Slovenian Cup, with ACH Volley
- 2021–22 Slovenian Championship, with ACH Volley
- 2022–23 Slovenian Cup, with ACH Volley
- 2022–23 Slovenian Championship, with ACH Volley
- 2023–24 Slovenian Championship, with ACH Volley
- 2024–25 Slovenian Cup, with ACH Volley
- 2024–25 Slovenian Championship, with ACH Volley
