= Yugoslav Volleyball Championship =

Former volleyball league

The Yugoslav Volleyball Championship was the highest level of volleyball competition in SFR Yugoslavia, contested between 1945 and 1991. After the dissolution of Yugoslavia, the league was succeeded by the following competitions:

- Premier League of Volleyball of Bosnia and Herzegovina
- Croatia Volleyball Championship
- Macedonian Volleyball Championship
- Slovenian Volleyball League (men)
- Slovenian Volleyball League (women)
- Serbian Volleyball League (men)
- Serbian Volleyball League (women)
- Montenegrin Volleyball League(men)
- Montenegrin Volleyball League (women)

== Title holders (men) ==
- 1945 (Socialist Republic of Croatia) Croatia
- 1946 (Socialist Republic of Serbia) Partizan
- 1947 (Socialist Republic of Serbia) Partizan
- 1948 (Socialist Republic of Croatia) Mladost
- 1949 (Socialist Republic of Serbia) Partizan
- 1950 (Socialist Republic of Serbia) Partizan
- 1951 (Socialist Republic of Serbia) Crvena Zvezda
- 1952 (Socialist Republic of Croatia) Mladost
- 1953 (Socialist Republic of Serbia) Partizan
- 1954 (Socialist Republic of Serbia) Crvena Zvezda
- 1955 (Socialist Republic of Slovenia) Branik Maribor
- 1956 (Socialist Republic of Serbia) Crvena Zvezda
- 1957 (Socialist Republic of Serbia) Crvena Zvezda
- 1958 (Socialist Republic of Serbia) Jugoslavija Belgrade
- 1959 (Socialist Republic of Serbia) Jugoslavija Belgrade
- 1960 (Socialist Republic of Serbia) Jugoslavija Belgrade
- 1961 (Socialist Republic of Serbia) Jugoslavija Belgrade
- 1962 (Socialist Republic of Croatia) Mladost
- 1963 (Socialist Republic of Croatia) Mladost
- 1964 (Socialist Republic of Serbia) Železničar Belgrade
- 1965 (Socialist Republic of Croatia) Mladost
- 1966 (Socialist Republic of Croatia) Mladost
- 1967 (Socialist Republic of Serbia) Partizan
- 1967–68 (Socialist Republic of Croatia) Mladost
- 1968–69 (Socialist Republic of Croatia) Mladost
- 1969–70 (Socialist Republic of Croatia) Mladost
- 1970–71 (Socialist Republic of Croatia) Mladost
- 1971–72 (Socialist Republic of Serbia) Gik Banat Zrenjanin
- 1972–73 (Socialist Republic of Serbia) Partizan
- 1973–74 (Socialist Republic of Serbia) Crvena Zvezda
- 1974–75 (Socialist Republic of Serbia) Spartak Subotica
- 1975–76 (Socialist Republic of Macedonia) Vardar
- 1976–77 (Socialist Republic of Croatia) Mladost
- 1977–78 (Socialist Republic of Serbia) Partizan
- 1978–79 (Socialist Republic of Bosnia and Herzegovina) Modriča
- 1979–80 (Socialist Republic of Serbia) Veliko Gradište
- 1980–81 (Socialist Republic of Croatia) Mladost
- 1981–82 (Socialist Republic of Croatia) Mladost
- 1982–83 (Socialist Republic of Croatia) Mladost
- 1983–84 (Socialist Republic of Croatia) Mladost
- 1984–85 (Socialist Republic of Croatia) Mladost
- 1985–86 (Socialist Republic of Croatia) Mladost
- 1986–87 (Socialist Republic of Bosnia and Herzegovina) Bosna
- 1987–88 (Socialist Republic of Serbia) Vojvodina
- 1988–89 (Socialist Republic of Serbia) Vojvodina
- 1989–90 (Socialist Republic of Serbia) Partizan
- 1990–91 (Socialist Republic of Serbia) Partizan

== Title holders (women) ==
Year	Champion - women
1945	Slovenia
1946	Polet Maribor
1947	Enotnost Ljubljana
1948	Enotnost Ljubljana
1949	Enotnost Ljubljana
1950	Enotnost Ljubljana
1951	Železničar Ljubljana
1952	Partizan Belgrade
1953	Branik Maribor
1954	Železničar Ljubljana
1955	Partizan Belgrade
1956	Partizan Belgrade
1957	Partizan Belgrade
1958	Partizan Belgrade
1959	Crvena Zvezda Belgrade
1960	Partizan Belgrade
1961	Partizan Belgrade
1962	Crvena Zvezda Belgrade
1963	Crvena Zvezda Belgrade
1964	Crvena Zvezda Belgrade
1965	Crvena Zvezda Belgrade
1966	Crvena Zvezda Belgrade
1967	Crvena Zvezda Belgrade
1968	Partizan Belgrade
1969	Crvena Zvezda Belgrade
1970	Crvena Zvezda Belgrade
1971	Crvena Zvezda Belgrade
1972	Crvena Zvezda Belgrade
1973	Partizan Rijeka
1974	SK Rijeka
1975	Crvena Zvezda Belgrade
1976	Crvena Zvezda Belgrade
1977	Crvena Zvezda Belgrade
1978	Crvena Zvezda Belgrade
1979	Crvena Zvezda Belgrade
1980	Radnički Belgrade
1981	Radnički Belgrade
1982	Crvena Zvezda Belgrade
1983	Crvena Zvezda Belgrade
1984	Mladost Zagreb
1985	Branik Maribor
1986	Branik Maribor
1987	Mladost Zagreb
1988	Radnički Beograd
1989	Mladost Zagreb
1990	Mladost Zagreb
1991	Mladost Zagreb

== Championships by club ==
=== Men ===
Club	Championships	Current nation
Mladost Zagreb	17	Croatia
Partizan Belgrade	10	Serbia
Crvena Zvezda Belgrade	5	Serbia
Jugoslavija Belgrade	4	Serbia
Vojvodina Novi Sad	2	Serbia
Bosna	1	Bosnia and Herzegovina
Branik Maribor	1	Slovenia
Gik Banat Zrenjanin	1	Serbia
SK Modriča	1	Bosnia and Herzegovina
Spartak Subotica	1	Serbia
Vardar Skopje	1	North Macedonia
Veliko Gradište SK	1	Serbia
Železničar Beograd	1	Serbia

=== Women ===
Club	Championships	Current nation
Crvena Zvezda Belgrade	18	Serbia
Partizan Belgrade	8	Serbia
Mladost Zagreb	5	Croatia
Enotnost Ljubljana	4	Slovenia
Polet / Branik Maribor	4	Slovenia
Radnički Belgrade	3	Serbia
Partizan / SK Rijeka	2	Croatia
Železničar Ljubljana	2	Slovenia
