= 2023–24 Women's CEV Cup =

European volleyball tournament

- League: Women's CEV Cup
- Sport: Volleyball
- Finals champions: (Italy) Reale Mutua Fenera Chieri '76
- Runners-up: (Switzerland) Vitéos Neuchâtel UC

Women's CEV Cup seasons
- ← 2022–23 2024–25 →

The 2023–24 Women's CEV Cup was the 52nd edition of the European CEV Cup volleyball club tournament.

== Format ==
Qualification round (Home and away matches):

- 32nd finals

Main phase (Home and away matches):

- 16th finals → 8th finals → Playoffs → Quarter-finals

Final phase (Home and away matches):

- Semi-finals → Finals

Aggregate score is counted as follows: 3 points for 3–0 or 3–1 win, 2 points for 3–2 win, 1 point for 2–3 loss.
In case the teams are tied after two legs, a Golden Set is played immediately at the completion of the second leg.

== Qualified teams ==
| (Croatia) Mladost Zagreb (CL Qualif. 2R) | (Czech Republic) Královo Pole Brno (CL Qualif. 2R) | (Montenegro) OK Herceg Novi (CL Qualif. 1R) | (Bosnia and Herzegovina) OK Gacko (CL Qualif. 1R) |
| (Spain) CV Gran Canaria (CL Qualif. 1R) | (Israel) Hapoel Kfar Saba (CL Qualif. 1R) | (Belgium) VC Oudegem | (Belgium) VDK Bank Gent |
| (Bosnia and Herzegovina) ŽOK Jedinstvo Brčko | (Croatia) Kelteks Karlovac | (Czech Republic) Šelmy Brno | (France) Béziers VB |
| (France) Levallois Paris Saint Cloud | (Germany) SSC Palmberg Schwerin | (Germany) Dresdner SC | (Hungary) Swietelsky Békéscsaba |
| (Hungary) Szent Benedek Balatonfured | (Italy) Reale Mutua Fenera Chieri'76 | (Poland) BKS Bostik Bielsko-Biała | (Poland) Grupa Azoty Chemik Police |
| (Portugal) FC Porto | (Serbia) Crvena Zvezda Beograd | (Serbia) ŽOK Železničar Lajkovac | (Slovenia) Nova KBM Branik Maribor |
| (Spain) Tenerife Libby’s La Laguna | (Switzerland) Vitéos Neuchâtel UC | (Switzerland) TS Volley Düdingen | (Turkey) THY Istanbul |

== Draw ==
The draw was held in Luxembourg on the 19 July 2023.

== 16th finals ==
| Team 1 | Agg. | Team 2 | 1st leg | 2nd leg |
|---|---|---|---|---|
| Crvena Zvezda Beograd (Serbia) | 5–1 | (Spain) Tenerife Libby’s La Laguna | 3–0 | 3–2 |
| Szent Benedek Balatonfured (Hungary) | 2–4 | (Czech Republic) Šelmy Brno | 1–3 | 3–2 |
| VC Oudegem (Belgium) | 0–6 | (Portugal) FC Porto | 1–3 | 0–3 |
| ŽOK Jedinstvo Brčko (Bosnia and Herzegovina) | 0–6 | (France) Béziers VB | 0–3 | 0–3 |
| Bye | – | (Slovenia) Nova KBM Branik Maribor | – | – |
| Bye | – | (Switzerland) Vitéos Neuchâtel UC | – | – |
| CV Gran Canaria (Spain) | 0–6 | (Germany) Dresdner SC | 0–3 | 0–3 |
| Bye | – | (Germany) SSC Palmberg Schwerin | – | – |
| Královo Pole Brno (Czech Republic) | 2–4 | (Serbia) ŽOK Železničar Lajkovac | 1–3 | 3–2 |
| TS Volley Düdingen (Switzerland) | 0–6 | (Italy) Reale Mutua Fenera Chieri'76 | 0–3 | 0–3 |
| Hapoel Kfar Saba (Israel) | 0–6 | (Poland) Grupa Azoty Chemik Police | w/o | w/o |
| BKS Bostik Bielsko-Biała (Poland) | 6–0 | (Hungary) Swietelsky Békéscsaba | 3–1 | 3–0 |
| OK Gacko (Bosnia and Herzegovina) | 4–2 | (Croatia) Kelteks Karlovac | 3–2 | 3–2 |
| Mladost Zagreb (Croatia) | 5–1 | (Belgium) VDK Bank Gent | 3–2 | 3–0 |
| OK Herceg Novi (Montenegro) | 0–6 | (France) Levallois Paris Saint Cloud | 0–3 | 0–3 |
| Bye | – | (Turkey) THY Istanbul | – | – |

=== First leg ===
| Date | Time | | Score | | Set 1 | Set 2 | Set 3 | Set 4 | Set 5 | Total | Report |
|---|---|---|---|---|---|---|---|---|---|---|---|
| 7 Nov | 19:00 | Crvena Zvezda Beograd (Serbia) | 3–0 | (Spain) Tenerife Libby’s La Laguna | 25–18 | 25–23 | 25–14 | | | 75–55 | |
| 9 Nov | 18:00 | Szent Benedek Balatonfured (Hungary) | 1–3 | (Czech Republic) Šelmy Brno | 25–14 | 20–25 | 21–25 | 22–25 | | 88–89 | |
| 9 Nov | 20:00 | VC Oudegem (Belgium) | 1–3 | (Portugal) FC Porto | 20–25 | 20–25 | 25–22 | 22–25 | | 87–97 | |
| 7 Nov | 19:00 | ŽOK Jedinstvo Brčko (Bosnia and Herzegovina) | 0–3 | (France) Béziers VB | 16–25 | 17–25 | 17–25 | | | 50–75 | |
| | | Bye | – | (Slovenia) Nova KBM Branik Maribor | – | – | – | | | 0–0 | |
| | | Bye | – | (Switzerland) Vitéos Neuchâtel UC | – | – | – | | | 0–0 | |
| 8 Nov | 20:00 | CV Gran Canaria (Spain) | 0–3 | (Germany) Dresdner SC | 23–25 | 21–25 | 30–32 | | | 74–82 | |
| | | Bye | – | (Germany) SSC Palmberg Schwerin | – | – | – | | | 0–0 | |
| 7 Nov | 18:00 | Královo Pole Brno (Czech Republic) | 1–3 | (Serbia) ŽOK Železničar Lajkovac | 21–25 | 25–19 | 22–25 | 9–25 | | 77–94 | |
| 7 Nov | 20:00 | TS Volley Düdingen (Switzerland) | 0–3 | (Italy) Reale Mutua Fenera Chieri'76 | 14–25 | 15–25 | 18–25 | | | 47–75 | |
| | | Hapoel Kfar Saba (Israel) | w/o | (Poland) Grupa Azoty Chemik Police | 0–25 | 0–25 | 0–25 | | | 0–75 | |
| 8 Nov | 18:00 | BKS Bostik Bielsko-Biała (Poland) | 3–1 | (Hungary) Swietelsky Békéscsaba | 22–25 | 25–21 | 25–17 | 25–12 | | 97–75 | |
| 8 Nov | 18:00 | OK Gacko (Bosnia and Herzegovina) | 3–2 | (Croatia) Kelteks Karlovac | 25–19 | 20–25 | 22–25 | 25–19 | 15–13 | 107–101 | |
| 9 Nov | 20:00 | Mladost Zagreb (Croatia) | 3–2 | (Belgium) VDK Bank Gent | 25–21 | 18–25 | 25–21 | 20–25 | 15–11 | 103–103 | |
| 7 Nov | 18:00 | OK Herceg Novi (Montenegro) | 0–3 | (France) Levallois Paris Saint Cloud | 14–25 | 16–25 | 18–25 | | | 48–75 | |
| | | Bye | – | (Turkey) THY Istanbul | – | – | – | | | 0–0 | |

=== Second leg ===
| Date | Time | | Score | | Set 1 | Set 2 | Set 3 | Set 4 | Set 5 | Total | Report |
|---|---|---|---|---|---|---|---|---|---|---|---|
| 15 Nov | 20:00 | Tenerife Libby’s La Laguna (Spain) | 2–3 | (Serbia) Crvena Zvezda Beograd | 21–25 | 25–23 | 27–25 | 23–25 | 11–15 | 107–113 | |
| 14 Nov | 18:00 | Šelmy Brno (Czech Republic) | 2–3 | (Hungary) Szent Benedek Balatonfured | 25–19 | 18–25 | 20–25 | 25–22 | 13–15 | 101–106 | |
| 14 Nov | 20:00 | FC Porto (Portugal) | 3–0 | (Belgium) VC Oudegem | 25–16 | 25–20 | 25–20 | | | 75–56 | |
| 15 Nov | 20:00 | Béziers VB (France) | 3–0 | (Bosnia and Herzegovina) ŽOK Jedinstvo Brčko | 25–11 | 25–9 | 25–13 | | | 75–33 | |
| | | Nova KBM Branik Maribor (Slovenia) | – | Bye | – | – | – | | | 0–0 | |
| | | Vitéos Neuchâtel UC (Switzerland) | – | Bye | – | – | – | | | 0–0 | |
| 15 Nov | 19:00 | Dresdner SC (Germany) | 3–0 | (Spain) CV Gran Canaria | 25–21 | 25–15 | 25–23 | | | 75–59 | |
| | | SSC Palmberg Schwerin (Germany) | – | Bye | – | – | – | | | 0–0 | |
| 15 Nov | 19:00 | ŽOK Železničar Lajkovac (Serbia) | 2–3 | (Czech Republic) Královo Pole Brno | 20–25 | 25–17 | 12–25 | 25–20 | 13–15 | 95–102 | |
| 14 Nov | 20:00 | Reale Mutua Fenera Chieri'76 (Italy) | 3–0 | (Switzerland) TS Volley Düdingen | 27–25 | 25–7 | 25–14 | | | 77–46 | |
| | | Grupa Azoty Chemik Police (Poland) | w/o | (Israel) Hapoel Kfar Saba | 25–0 | 25–0 | 25–0 | | | 75–0 | |
| 15 Nov | 18:00 | Swietelsky Békéscsaba (Hungary) | 0–3 | (Poland) BKS Bostik Bielsko-Biała | 21–25 | 19–25 | 24–26 | | | 64–76 | |
| 15 Nov | 20:00 | Kelteks Karlovac (Croatia) | 2–3 | (Bosnia and Herzegovina) OK Gacko | 25–19 | 25–27 | 21–25 | 25–23 | 8–15 | 104–109 | |
| 15 Nov | 20:30 | VDK Bank Gent (Belgium) | 0–3 | (Croatia) Mladost Zagreb | 23–25 | 20–25 | 22–25 | | | 65–75 | |
| 15 Nov | 20:00 | Levallois Paris Saint Cloud (France) | 3–0 | (Montenegro) OK Herceg Novi | 25–17 | 25–16 | 25–20 | | | 75–53 | |
| | | THY Istanbul (Turkey) | – | Bye | – | – | – | | | 0–0 | |

== 8th finals ==
| Team 1 | Agg. | Team 2 | 1st leg | 2nd leg |
|---|---|---|---|---|
| Crvena Zvezda Beograd (Serbia) | 5–1 | (Czech Republic) Šelmy Brno | 3–1 | 3–2 |
| FC Porto (Portugal) | 2–4 | (France) Béziers VB | 3–2 | 1–3 |
| Nova KBM Branik Maribor (Slovenia) | 1–5 | (Switzerland) Vitéos Neuchâtel UC | 1–3 | 2–3 |
| Dresdner SC (Germany) | 6–0 | (Germany) SSC Palmberg Schwerin | 3–0 | 3–1 |
| Železničar Lajkovac (Serbia) | 0–6 | (Italy) Reale Mutua Fenera Chieri'76 | 0–3 | 0–3 |
| Grupa Azoty Chemik Police (Poland) | 6–0 | (Poland) BKS Bostik Bielsko-Biała | 3–0 | 3–1 |
| OK Gacko (Bosnia and Herzegovina) | 0–6 | (Croatia) Mladost Zagreb | 0–3 | 0–3 |
| Levallois Paris Saint Cloud (France) | 4–2 | (Turkey) THY Istanbul | 3–2 | 3–2 |

=== First leg ===
| Date | Time | | Score | | Set 1 | Set 2 | Set 3 | Set 4 | Set 5 | Total | Report |
|---|---|---|---|---|---|---|---|---|---|---|---|
| 28 Nov | 18:00 | Crvena Zvezda Beograd (Serbia) | 3–1 | (Czech Republic) Šelmy Brno | 20–25 | 26–24 | 25–20 | 25–21 | | 96–90 | |
| 28 Nov | 18:00 | FC Porto (Portugal) | 3–2 | (France) Béziers VB | 20–25 | 25–23 | 28–26 | 20–25 | 15–12 | 108–111 | |
| 29 Nov | 19:00 | Nova KBM Branik Maribor (Slovenia) | 1–3 | (Switzerland) Vitéos Neuchâtel UC | 27–29 | 20–25 | 25–14 | 19–25 | | 91–93 | |
| 29 Nov | 19:00 | Dresdner SC (Germany) | 3–0 | (Germany) SSC Palmberg Schwerin | 30–28 | 25–23 | 25–22 | | | 80–73 | |
| 29 Nov | 19:00 | Železničar Lajkovac (Serbia) | 0–3 | (Italy) Reale Mutua Fenera Chieri'76 | 11–25 | 12–25 | 13–25 | | | 36–75 | |
| 29 Nov | 18:00 | Grupa Azoty Chemik Police (Poland) | 3–0 | (Poland) BKS Bostik Bielsko-Biała | 25–23 | 25–13 | 25–19 | | | 75–55 | |
| 29 Nov | 18:00 | OK Gacko (Bosnia and Herzegovina) | 0–3 | (Croatia) Mladost Zagreb | 19–25 | 10–25 | 16–25 | | | 45–75 | |
| 28 Nov | 20:00 | Levallois Paris Saint Cloud (France) | 3–2 | (Turkey) THY Istanbul | 21–25 | 25–16 | 16–25 | 25–21 | 15–13 | 102–100 | |

=== Second leg ===
| Date | Time | | Score | | Set 1 | Set 2 | Set 3 | Set 4 | Set 5 | Total | Report |
|---|---|---|---|---|---|---|---|---|---|---|---|
| 5 Dec | 18:00 | Šelmy Brno (Czech Republic) | 2–3 | (Serbia) Crvena Zvezda Beograd | 16–25 | 25–22 | 25–23 | 11–25 | 9–15 | 86–110 | |
| 5 Dec | 20:00 | Béziers VB (France) | 3–1 | (Portugal) FC Porto | 23–25 | 25–23 | 26–24 | 25–21 | | 99–93 | |
| 7 Dec | 19:00 | Vitéos Neuchâtel UC (Switzerland) | 3–2 | (Slovenia) Nova KBM Branik Maribor | 25–17 | 25–12 | 21–25 | 16–25 | 15–10 | 102–89 | |
| 5 Dec | 18:00 | SSC Palmberg Schwerin (Germany) | 1–3 | (Germany) Dresdner SC | 25–16 | 22–25 | 21–25 | 20–25 | | 88–91 | |
| 7 Dec | 20:00 | Reale Mutua Fenera Chieri'76 (Italy) | 3–0 | (Serbia) Železničar Lajkovac | 25–19 | 25–17 | 25–19 | | | 75–55 | |
| 7 Dec | 18:00 | BKS Bostik Bielsko-Biała (Poland) | 1–3 | (Poland) Grupa Azoty Chemik Police | 25–16 | 20–25 | 18–25 | 23–25 | | 86–91 | |
| 5 Dec | 19:00 | Mladost Zagreb (Croatia) | 3–0 | (Bosnia and Herzegovina) OK Gacko | 25–14 | 25–15 | 25–23 | | | 75–52 | |
| 5 Dec | 15:30 | THY Istanbul (Turkey) | 2–3 | (France) Levallois Paris Saint Cloud | 20–25 | 25–12 | 23–25 | 25–21 | 12–15 | 105–98 | |

== Playoffs ==
| Team 1 | Agg. | Team 2 | 1st leg | 2nd leg |
|---|---|---|---|---|
| Crvena Zvezda Beograd (Serbia) | 2–4 | (France) Béziers VB | 3–2 | 0–3 |
| Vitéos Neuchâtel UC (Switzerland) | 4–2 | (Germany) Dresdner SC | 2–3 | 3–1 |
| Reale Mutua Fenera Chieri'76 (Italy) | 5–1 | (Poland) Grupa Azoty Chemik Police | 3–1 | 3–2 |
| Mladost Zagreb (Croatia) | 0–6 | (France) Levallois Paris Saint Cloud | 0–3 | 0–3 |

=== First leg ===
| Date | Time | | Score | | Set 1 | Set 2 | Set 3 | Set 4 | Set 5 | Total | Report |
|---|---|---|---|---|---|---|---|---|---|---|---|
| 11 Jan | 18:00 | Crvena Zvezda Beograd (Serbia) | 3–2 | (France) Béziers VB | 15–25 | 25–27 | 25–19 | 25–20 | 15–13 | 105–104 | |
| 10 Jan | 19:30 | Vitéos Neuchâtel UC (Switzerland) | 2–3 | (Germany) Dresdner SC | 25–21 | 20–25 | 25–18 | 18–25 | 11–15 | 99–104 | |
| 10 Jan | 20:00 | Reale Mutua Fenera Chieri'76 (Italy) | 3–1 | (Poland) Grupa Azoty Chemik Police | 25–19 | 16–25 | 25–20 | 25–19 | | 91–83 | |
| 9 Jan | 19:00 | Mladost Zagreb (Croatia) | 0–3 | (France) Levallois Paris Saint Cloud | 21–25 | 19–25 | 23–25 | | | 63–75 | |

=== Second leg ===
| Date | Time | | Score | | Set 1 | Set 2 | Set 3 | Set 4 | Set 5 | Total | Report |
|---|---|---|---|---|---|---|---|---|---|---|---|
| 16 Jan | 19:30 | Béziers VB (France) | 3–0 | (Serbia) Crvena Zvezda Beograd | 25–21 | 25–22 | 25–18 | | | 75–61 | |
| 17 Jan | 19:00 | Dresdner SC (Germany) | 1–3 | (Switzerland) Vitéos Neuchâtel UC | 20–25 | 25–13 | 18–25 | 22–25 | | 85–88 | |
| 18 Jan | 18:00 | Grupa Azoty Chemik Police (Poland) | 2–3 | (Italy) Reale Mutua Fenera Chieri'76 | 20–25 | 21–25 | 25–20 | 35–33 | 13–15 | 114–118 | |
| 16 Jan | 20:00 | Levallois Paris Saint Cloud (France) | 3–0 | (Croatia) Mladost Zagreb | 25–15 | 26–24 | 25–22 | | | 76–61 | |

== Quarter-finals ==
| Team 1 | Agg. | Team 2 | 1st leg | 2nd leg | Golden Set |
|---|---|---|---|---|---|
| Grot Budowlani Łódź (Poland) | 5–1 | (France) Béziers VB | 3–1 | 3–2 | |
| Jedinstvo Stara Pazova (Serbia) | 3–3 | (Switzerland) Vitéos Neuchâtel UC | 3–1 | 1–3 | 13–15 |
| Volero Le Cannet (France) | 2–4 | (Italy) Reale Mutua Fenera Chieri'76 | 2–3 | 2–3 | |
| Vasas Óbuda Budapest (Hungary) | 1–5 | (France) Levallois Paris Saint Cloud | 1–3 | 2–3 | |

=== First leg ===
| Date | Time | | Score | | Set 1 | Set 2 | Set 3 | Set 4 | Set 5 | Total | Report |
|---|---|---|---|---|---|---|---|---|---|---|---|
| 31 Jan | 18:00 | Grot Budowlani Łódź (Poland) | 3–1 | (France) Béziers VB | 20–25 | 25–21 | 25–20 | 25–23 | | 95–89 | |
| 30 Jan | 19:00 | Jedinstvo Stara Pazova (Serbia) | 3–1 | (Switzerland) Vitéos Neuchâtel UC | 25–27 | 25–23 | 25–20 | 25–20 | | 100–90 | |
| 31 Jan | 20:00 | Volero Le Cannet (France) | 2–3 | (Italy) Reale Mutua Fenera Chieri'76 | 25–22 | 25–18 | 23–25 | 20–25 | 13–15 | 106–105 | |
| 30 Jan | 19:00 | Vasas Óbuda Budapest (Hungary) | 1–3 | (France) Levallois Paris Saint Cloud | 25–14 | 20–25 | 19–25 | 20–25 | | 84–89 | |

=== Second leg ===
| Date | Time | | Score | | Set 1 | Set 2 | Set 3 | Set 4 | Set 5 | Total | Report |
|---|---|---|---|---|---|---|---|---|---|---|---|
| 6 Feb | 19:30 | Béziers VB (France) | 2–3 | (Poland) Grot Budowlani Łódź | 21–25 | 16–25 | 25–23 | 25–20 | 11–15 | 98–108 | |
| 7 Feb | 19:30 | Vitéos Neuchâtel UC (Switzerland) | 3–1 | (Serbia) Jedinstvo Stara Pazova | 25–23 | 20–25 | 25–19 | 25–18 | | 95–85 | |
| Golden set | | Vitéos Neuchâtel UC (Switzerland) | 15–13 | (Serbia) Jedinstvo Stara Pazova | | | | | | | |
| 7 Feb | 20:00 | Reale Mutua Fenera Chieri'76 (Italy) | 3–2 | (France) Volero Le Cannet | 25–10 | 19–25 | 25–19 | 20–25 | 21–19 | 110–98 | |
| 7 Feb | 20:00 | Levallois Paris Saint Cloud (France) | 3–2 | (Hungary) Vasas Óbuda Budapest | 23–25 | 25–15 | 25–22 | 21–25 | 15–13 | 109–100 | |

== Semi-finals ==
| Team 1 | Agg. | Team 2 | 1st leg | 2nd leg | Golden Set |
|---|---|---|---|---|---|
| Grot Budowlani Łódź (Poland) | 3–3 | (Switzerland) Vitéos Neuchâtel UC | 1–3 | 3–1 | 13–15 |
| Reale Mutua Fenera Chieri'76 (Italy) | 5–1 | (France) Levallois Paris Saint Cloud | 3–2 | 3–0 | |

=== First leg ===
| Date | Time | | Score | | Set 1 | Set 2 | Set 3 | Set 4 | Set 5 | Total | Report |
|---|---|---|---|---|---|---|---|---|---|---|---|
| 21 Feb | 17:30 | Grot Budowlani Łódź (Poland) | 1–3 | (Switzerland) Vitéos Neuchâtel UC | 25–17 | 21–25 | 26–28 | 22–25 | | 94–95 | |
| 21 Feb | 20:00 | Reale Mutua Fenera Chieri'76 (Italy) | 3–2 | (France) Levallois Paris Saint Cloud | 20–25 | 25–17 | 23–25 | 25–15 | 15–13 | 108–95 | |

=== Second leg ===
| Date | Time | | Score | | Set 1 | Set 2 | Set 3 | Set 4 | Set 5 | Total | Report |
|---|---|---|---|---|---|---|---|---|---|---|---|
| 27 Feb | 19:00 | Vitéos Neuchâtel UC (Switzerland) | 1–3 | (Poland) Grot Budowlani Łódź | 21–25 | 21–25 | 25–17 | 23–25 | | 90–92 | |
| Golden set | | Vitéos Neuchâtel UC (Switzerland) | 15–13 | (Poland) Grot Budowlani Łódź | | | | | | | |
| 28 Feb | 20:00 | Levallois Paris Saint Cloud (France) | 0–3 | (Italy) Reale Mutua Fenera Chieri'76 | 22–25 | 23–25 | 23–25 | | | 68–75 | |

== Final ==
By reaching the final, Vitéos Neuchâtel UC became the first Swiss team since 2003 to reach the final of this competition.

| Team 1 | Agg. | Team 2 | 1st leg | 2nd leg |
|---|---|---|---|---|
| Vitéos Neuchâtel UC (Switzerland) | 0–6 | (Italy) Reale Mutua Fenera Chieri'76 | 0–3 | 1–3 |

=== First leg ===
| Date | Time | | Score | | Set 1 | Set 2 | Set 3 | Set 4 | Set 5 | Total | Report |
|---|---|---|---|---|---|---|---|---|---|---|---|
| 13 Mar | 19:00 | Vitéos Neuchâtel UC (Switzerland) | 0–3 | (Italy) Reale Mutua Fenera Chieri'76 | 23–25 | 13–25 | 24–26 | | | 60–76 | |

=== Second leg ===
| Date | Time | | Score | | Set 1 | Set 2 | Set 3 | Set 4 | Set 5 | Total | Report |
|---|---|---|---|---|---|---|---|---|---|---|---|
| 20 Mar | 20:45 | Reale Mutua Fenera Chieri'76 (Italy) | 3–1 | (Switzerland) Vitéos Neuchâtel UC | 25–9 | 25–20 | 20–25 | 25–13 | | 95–67 | |

== See also ==
- 2023–24 CEV Champions League
- 2023–24 CEV Cup
- 2023–24 CEV Challenge Cup
- 2023–24 CEV Women's Champions League
- 2023–24 CEV Women's Challenge Cup
