= Rok Možič =

Slovenian volleyball player (born 2002)

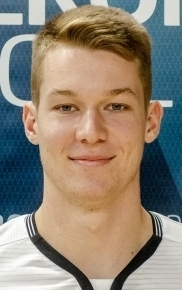

Personal information
- Nationality: Slovenian
- Born: 17 January 2002 (age 24); Maribor, Slovenia
- Height: 2.00 m (6 ft 7 in)

Volleyball information
- Position: Outside hitter
- Current club: Verona Volley
- Number: 19

Career
Years	Teams
2019–2021; 2021– 2026	Merkur Maribor; Verona Volley → Jakarta Bhayangkara Presisi (loan)

National team
2020–	Slovenia
Honours
Men's volleyball
Representing Slovenia
FIVB Nations League
Bronze medal – third place	2026 China
CEV European Championship
Silver medal – second place	2021 Poland/Czech Republic/Estonia/Finland
Bronze medal – third place	2023 Italy/Bulgaria/North Macedonia/Israel

Rok Možič (born 17 January 2002) is a Slovenian volleyball player who plays as an outside hitter for Superlega club Verona Volley, which he also captains, and the Slovenia national team.

== Career ==
=== Club ===
Možič started playing volleyball at the age of 7 in the youth teams of OK Maribor. In 2021, he won the Slovenian Championship with Maribor, having beaten ACH Volley in the finals.

In the summer of 2021, Možič signed his first contract abroad with Verona Volley in Italian Superlega. In his first season, he became the league's leading scorer with 466 points and received the MVP award for February. In 2023, at the age of 21, he became the team's captain, replacing Raphael. Možič won his first trophy with Verona in 2026 after winning the 2025–26 edition of Coppa Italia, where they defeated Trentino Volley 3–0 in the final, with Možič scoring nine points.

In May 2026, Možič received permission from Verona to temporarily join Indonesian club Jakarta Bhayangkara Presisi for their 2026 AVC Men's Volleyball Champions League campaign. The team ultimately won the competition after defeating Iranian club Foolad Sirjan 3–1 in the final, becoming the first Indonesian team to do so.

=== National team ===
Možič made his maiden appearance for the Slovenia national team at the age of 17 at the European Qualifying Tournament for the 2020 Olympic Games. In 2021, Slovenia, including Možič, made it to the final of the European Championship, where they lost to Italy.

== Personal life ==
Both his parents were volleyball players. His father, Peter Možič, is a volleyball coach.

== Honours ==
=== Club ===
- Domestic
  - 2020–21 Slovenian Championship, with Merkur Maribor
  - 2025–26 Coppa Italia, with Verona Volley
- Continental
  - 2026 AVC Men's Volleyball Champions League, with Jakarta Bhayangkara Presisi

=== Youth national team ===
- Beach volleyball
  - 2018 CEV U18 European Championship, with Rok Bračko
  - 2021 CEV U20 European Championship, with Rok Bračko
