= Croatia women's national under-23 volleyball team =

Croatia U23
- Association: Croatian Volleyball Federation
- Confederation: CEV

Uniforms
Home	Away	Third

FIVB U23 World Championship
- Appearances: None

The Croatia women's national under-23 volleyball team represents Croatia in international women's volleyball competitions and friendly matches under the age 23 and it is ruled by the Croatian Volleyball Federation That is an affiliate of International Volleyball Federation FIVB and also a part of European Volleyball Confederation CEV.

== Results ==
=== FIVB U23 World Championship ===
World Championship record									World Championship qualification record				
Year	Round	Position	Pld	W	L	SW	SL	Squad	Pld	W	L	SW	SL
(Mexico) 2013	Did not qualify								Determined by ranking				
(Turkey) 2015	Did not qualify								Determined by ranking				
(Slovenia) 2017	Did not qualify								5	0	5	1	15
Total	Qualified: 0/3		—	—	—	—	—	—	5	0	5	1	15
