= 2023–24 CEV Women's Champions League =

- League: CEV Women's Champions League
- Sport: Volleyball
- Duration: Qualifying round: 10–27 October 2023; Main tournament: 7 November 2023 – 5 May 2024
- Number of matches: 79
- Number of teams: Main tournament: 20; Total: 26
- Total attendance: 176,730
- Average attendance: 2,237

Finals
- Venue: (Turkey) Antalya Sports Hall
- Champions: (Italy) A. Carraro Imoco Conegliano
- Runners-up: (Italy) Allianz Vero Volley Milano
- Finals MVP: (Sweden) Isabelle Haak

CEV Women's Champions League seasons
- ← 2022–23 2024–25 →

The 2023–24 CEV Women's Champions League was the 64th edition of the highest level European volleyball club competition organised by the European Volleyball Confederation.

== Teams ==
A total of 26 teams from 18 countries participated in 2023–24 CEV Women's Champions League.

- TH: Champions League title holders
- 1st, 2nd, 3rd.: Final position in national leagues of the previous season

Qualified teams for 2023–24 CEV Women's Champions League (by entry round)
League round
(Italy) A. Carraro Imoco Conegliano (1st)	(Turkey) VakıfBank Istanbul (3rd)^{TH}	(France) Volley Mulhouse Alsace (2nd)	(Hungary) Vasas Óbuda Budapest (1st)
(Italy) Allianz Vero Volley Milano (2nd)	(Poland) ŁKS Commercecon Łódź (1st)	(Germany) Allianz MTV Stuttgart (1st)	(Slovenia) Calcit Kamnik (1st)
(Italy) Savino Del Bene Scandicci (3rd)	(Poland) PGE Rysice Rzeszów (2nd)	(Germany) SC Potsdam (2nd)	(Serbia) Jedinstvo Stara Pazova (1st)
(Turkey) Fenerbahçe Opet Istanbul (1st)	(Poland) Grot Budowlani Łódź (3rd)	(Ukraine) SC "Prometey" Dnipro (1st)	
(Turkey) Eczacıbaşı Dynavit Istanbul (2nd)	(France) Volero Le Cannet (1st)	(Bulgaria) Maritza Plovdiv (1st)	
Qualifying rounds
(Czech Republic) Královo Pole Brno (1st)	(Bosnia and Herzegovina) OK Gacko (1st)	(Belgium) Asterix Avo Beveren (1st)	(Montenegro) OK Herceg Novi (1st)
(Croatia) Mladost Zagreb (1st)	(Romania) CS Volei Alba Blaj (1st)	(Spain) CV Gran Canaria (1st)	(Israel) Hapoel Kfar Saba (1st)

== Pools composition ==
Drawing of lots for the league round was held on 19 July 2023 in Luxembourg City. The 20 teams are divided in 4 pots of 5 teams each, with one team per pot being draw into each of the 5 pools (A, B, C, D, E).

Pot 1	Pot 2	Pot 3	Pot 4
(Italy) A. Carraro Imoco Conegliano (Italy) Allianz Vero Volley Milano (Turkey) Fenerbahçe Opet Istanbul (Turkey) Eczacıbaşı Dynavit Istanbul (Poland) ŁKS Commercecon Łódź	(Italy) Savino Del Bene Scandicci (Turkey) VakıfBank Istanbul (Poland) PGE Rysice Rzeszów (Poland) Grot Budowlani Łódź (France) Volero Le Cannet	(France) Volley Mulhouse Alsace (Germany) Allianz MTV Stuttgart (Germany) SC Potsdam (Ukraine) SC "Prometey" Dnipro (Bulgaria) Maritza Plovdiv	(Hungary) Vasas Óbuda Budapest (Slovenia) Calcit Kamnik (Serbia) Jedinstvo Stara Pazova (Belgium) Asterix Avo Beveren (Note: Winners of the qualifying second round.) (Romania) CS Volei Alba Blaj (Note: Runners-up of the qualifying second round.)

Draw

Pool A	Pool B	Pool C	Pool D	Pool E
(Italy) Allianz Vero Volley Milano	(Turkey) Eczacıbaşı Dynavit Istanbul	(Turkey) Fenerbahçe Opet Istanbul	(Italy) A. Carraro Imoco Conegliano	(Poland) ŁKS Commercecon Łódź
(Turkey) VakıfBank Istanbul	(Italy) Savino Del Bene Scandicci	(Poland) Grot Budowlani Łódź	(Poland) PGE Rysice Rzeszów	(France) Volero Le Cannet
(France) Volley Mulhouse Alsace	(Bulgaria) Maritza Plovdiv	(Germany) SC Potsdam	(Germany) Allianz MTV Stuttgart	(Ukraine) SC "Prometey" Dnipro
(Serbia) Jedinstvo Stara Pazova	(Hungary) Vasas Óbuda Budapest	(Slovenia) Calcit Kamnik	(Belgium) Asterix Avo Beveren	(Romania) CS Volei Alba Blaj

== League round ==
- All times are local.
- The top teams in each pool automatically qualifies for the quarterfinals.
- The all second-placed teams and the best third-placed team qualify to the playoffs.
- The third-placed teams that fail to qualify for the playoffs will compete in the CEV Cup quarterfinals.

Pool standing procedure
The ranking of teams in the league round will be determined as follows:
1. Number of matches won
2. Match points
3. Sets ratio
4. Points ratio
5. Head-to-head

Match won 3–0 or 3–1: 3 match points for the winner, 0 match points for the loser
Match won 3–2: 2 match points for the winner, 1 match point for the loser

=== Pool A ===
Pos	Team	Pld	W	L	Pts	SW	SL	SR	SPW	SPL	SPR	Qualification
1	(Italy) Allianz Vero Volley Milano	6	5	1	16	17	4	4.250	492	366	1.344	Quarterfinals
2	(Turkey) VakıfBank Istanbul	6	5	1	14	15	6	2.500	480	424	1.132	Playoffs
3	(Serbia) Jedinstvo Stara Pazova	6	2	4	5	7	15	0.467	427	495	0.863	CEV Cup
4	(France) Volley Mulhouse Alsace	6	0	6	1	4	18	0.222	412	526	0.783	

Source: CEV

Date	Time		Score		Set 1	Set 2	Set 3	Set 4	Set 5	Total	Report
8 Nov	19:30	VakıfBank Istanbul (Turkey)	3–0	(France) Volley Mulhouse Alsace	25–22	25–13	29–27			79–62	P2 Report
9 Nov	20:00	Allianz Vero Volley Milano (Italy)	3–0	(Serbia) Jedinstvo Stara Pazova	25–15	25–16	25–20			75–51	P2 Report
14 Nov	21:00	Volley Mulhouse Alsace (France)	0–3	(Italy) Allianz Vero Volley Milano	11–25	12–25	22–25			45–75	P2 Report
15 Nov	19:00	Jedinstvo Stara Pazova (Serbia)	0–3	(Turkey) VakıfBank Istanbul	15–25	17–25	14–25			46–75	P2 Report
29 Nov	19:00	Jedinstvo Stara Pazova (Serbia)	3–2	(France) Volley Mulhouse Alsace	21–25	25–20	21–25	25–18	15–4	107–92	P2 Report
29 Nov	19:30	VakıfBank Istanbul (Turkey)	0–3	(Italy) Allianz Vero Volley Milano	17–25	17–25	16–25			50–75	P2 Report
6 Dec	19:30	VakıfBank Istanbul (Turkey)	3–1	(Serbia) Jedinstvo Stara Pazova	25–22	21–25	25–19	25–17		96–83	P2 Report
6 Dec	20:00	Allianz Vero Volley Milano (Italy)	3–1	(France) Volley Mulhouse Alsace	25–18	18–25	25–16	25–13		93–72	P2 Report
9 Jan	19:00	Volley Mulhouse Alsace (France)	0–3	(Turkey) VakıfBank Istanbul	22–25	20–25	17–25			59–75	P2 Report
10 Jan	19:00	Jedinstvo Stara Pazova (Serbia)	0–3	(Italy) Allianz Vero Volley Milano	14–25	16–25	13–25			43–75	P2 Report
16 Jan	19:00	Volley Mulhouse Alsace (France)	1–3	(Serbia) Jedinstvo Stara Pazova	25–22	20–25	15–25	22–25		82–97	P2 Report
16 Jan	20:00	Allianz Vero Volley Milano (Italy)	2–3	(Turkey) VakıfBank Istanbul	20–25	17–25	25–22	25–18	12–15	99–105	P2 Report

=== Pool B ===
Pos	Team	Pld	W	L	Pts	SW	SL	SR	SPW	SPL	SPR	Qualification
1	(Italy) Savino Del Bene Scandicci	6	6	0	18	18	2	9.000	493	377	1.308	Quarterfinals
2	(Turkey) Eczacıbaşı Dynavit Istanbul	6	4	2	12	14	7	2.000	503	441	1.141	Playoffs
3	(Hungary) Vasas Óbuda Budapest	6	1	5	4	6	15	0.400	416	483	0.861	CEV Cup
4	(Bulgaria) Maritza Plovdiv	6	1	5	2	3	17	0.176	358	469	0.763	

Source: CEV

Date	Time		Score		Set 1	Set 2	Set 3	Set 4	Set 5	Total	Report
8 Nov	19:00	Eczacıbaşı Dynavit Istanbul (Turkey)	3–0	(Hungary) Vasas Óbuda Budapest	27–25	25–21	25–17			77–63	P2 Report
8 Nov	20:00	Savino Del Bene Scandicci (Italy)	3–0	(Bulgaria) Maritza Plovdiv	25–15	25–14	25–11			75–40	P2 Report
15 Nov	19:00	Vasas Óbuda Budapest (Hungary)	0–3	(Italy) Savino Del Bene Scandicci	18–25	18–25	22–25			58–75	P2 Report
16 Nov	19:00	Maritza Plovdiv (Bulgaria)	0–3	(Turkey) Eczacıbaşı Dynavit Istanbul	13–25	16–25	20–25			49–75	P2 Report
29 Nov	19:00	Vasas Óbuda Budapest (Hungary)	2–3	(Bulgaria) Maritza Plovdiv	25–22	17–25	18–25	25–14	8–15	93–101	P2 Report
29 Nov	20:00	Savino Del Bene Scandicci (Italy)	3–1	(Turkey) Eczacıbaşı Dynavit Istanbul	25–14	25–27	27–25	25–23		102–89	P2 Report
5 Dec	19:00	Eczacıbaşı Dynavit Istanbul (Turkey)	3–0	(Bulgaria) Maritza Plovdiv	25–19	25–20	25–19			75–58	P2 Report
6 Dec	18:30	Savino Del Bene Scandicci (Italy)	3–0	(Hungary) Vasas Óbuda Budapest	25–14	25–19	25–15			75–48	P2 Report
10 Jan	19:00	Vasas Óbuda Budapest (Hungary)	1–3	(Turkey) Eczacıbaşı Dynavit Istanbul	15–25	16–25	25–20	22–25		78–95	P2 Report
10 Jan	19:00	Maritza Plovdiv (Bulgaria)	0–3	(Italy) Savino Del Bene Scandicci	20–25	14–25	16–25			50–75	P2 Report
16 Jan	17:00	Eczacıbaşı Dynavit Istanbul (Turkey)	1–3	(Italy) Savino Del Bene Scandicci	23–25	21–25	25–16	23–25		92–91	P2 Report
16 Jan	19:00	Maritza Plovdiv (Bulgaria)	0–3	(Hungary) Vasas Óbuda Budapest	24–26	19–25	17–25			60–76	P2 Report

=== Pool C ===
Pos	Team	Pld	W	L	Pts	SW	SL	SR	SPW	SPL	SPR	Qualification
1	(Turkey) Fenerbahçe Opet Istanbul	6	6	0	18	18	0	MAX	451	331	1.363	Quarterfinals
2	(Germany) SC Potsdam	6	4	2	11	12	9	1.333	463	457	1.013	Playoffs
3	(Poland) Grot Budowlani Łódź	6	2	4	6	7	13	0.538	427	461	0.926	CEV Cup
4	(Slovenia) Calcit Kamnik	6	0	6	1	3	18	0.167	409	501	0.816	

Source: CEV

Date	Time		Score		Set 1	Set 2	Set 3	Set 4	Set 5	Total	Report
7 Nov	18:00	Grot Budowlani Łódź (Poland)	0–3	(Germany) SC Potsdam	21–25	18–25	24–26			63–76	P2 Report
7 Nov	19:00	Fenerbahçe Opet Istanbul (Turkey)	3–0	(Slovenia) Calcit Kamnik	25–16	25–18	25–19			75–53	P2 Report
14 Nov	18:00	Calcit Kamnik (Slovenia)	1–3	(Poland) Grot Budowlani Łódź	22–25	25–14	18–25	17–25		82–89	P2 Report
14 Nov	19:00	SC Potsdam (Germany)	0–3	(Turkey) Fenerbahçe Opet Istanbul	18–25	20–25	19–25			57–75	P2 Report
28 Nov	20:30	Grot Budowlani Łódź (Poland)	0–3	(Turkey) Fenerbahçe Opet Istanbul	24–26	18–25	19–25			61–76	P2 Report
30 Nov	18:00	Calcit Kamnik (Slovenia)	2–3	(Germany) SC Potsdam	25–18	23–25	18–25	25–23	14–16	105–107	P2 Report
6 Dec	19:00	Fenerbahçe Opet Istanbul (Turkey)	3–0	(Germany) SC Potsdam	25–13	25–19	25–15			75–47	P2 Report
6 Dec	20:30	Grot Budowlani Łódź (Poland)	3–0	(Slovenia) Calcit Kamnik	25–22	25–17	25–17			75–56	P2 Report
10 Jan	20:30	SC Potsdam (Germany)	3–1	(Poland) Grot Budowlani Łódź	20–25	25–16	26–24	25–18		96–83	P2 Report
11 Jan	18:00	Calcit Kamnik (Slovenia)	0–3	(Turkey) Fenerbahçe Opet Istanbul	21–25	17–25	19–25			57–75	P2 Report
16 Jan	19:00	SC Potsdam (Germany)	3–0	(Slovenia) Calcit Kamnik	30–28	25–10	25–18			80–56	P2 Report
16 Jan	20:00	Fenerbahçe Opet Istanbul (Turkey)	3–0	(Poland) Grot Budowlani Łódź	25–20	25–19	25–17			75–56	P2 Report

=== Pool D ===
Pos	Team	Pld	W	L	Pts	SW	SL	SR	SPW	SPL	SPR	Qualification
1	(Italy) A. Carraro Imoco Conegliano	6	6	0	18	18	3	6.000	516	384	1.344	Quarterfinals
2	(Germany) Allianz MTV Stuttgart	6	3	3	9	12	11	1.091	504	466	1.082	Playoffs
3	(Poland) PGE Rysice Rzeszów	6	3	3	9	13	13	1.000	543	572	0.949	Playoffs
4	(Belgium) Asterix Avo Beveren	6	0	6	0	2	18	0.111	357	498	0.717	

Source: CEV

Date	Time		Score		Set 1	Set 2	Set 3	Set 4	Set 5	Total	Report
7 Nov	20:30	A. Carraro Imoco Conegliano (Italy)	3–0	(Belgium) Asterix Avo Beveren	27–25	25–16	25–16			77–57	P2 Report
7 Nov	20:30	PGE Rysice Rzeszów (Poland)	3–2	(Germany) Allianz MTV Stuttgart	23–25	26–24	17–25	25–23	15–12	106–109	P2 Report
15 Nov	19:00	Allianz MTV Stuttgart (Germany)	1–3	(Italy) A. Carraro Imoco Conegliano	25–21	19–25	20–25	18–25		82–96	P2 Report
16 Nov	20:00	Asterix Avo Beveren (Belgium)	1–3	(Poland) PGE Rysice Rzeszów	19–25	24–26	25–22	14–25		82–98	P2 Report
28 Nov	20:00	Asterix Avo Beveren (Belgium)	0–3	(Germany) Allianz MTV Stuttgart	20–25	18–25	16–25			54–75	P2 Report
29 Nov	20:30	PGE Rysice Rzeszów (Poland)	1–3	(Italy) A. Carraro Imoco Conegliano	15–25	15–25	25–17	26–28		81–95	P2 Report
5 Dec	20:30	A. Carraro Imoco Conegliano (Italy)	3–0	(Germany) Allianz MTV Stuttgart	25–19	25–15	25–23			75–57	P2 Report
7 Dec	18:00	PGE Rysice Rzeszów (Poland)	3–1	(Belgium) Asterix Avo Beveren	25–23	25–16	23–25	25–18		98–82	P2 Report
10 Jan	19:00	Allianz MTV Stuttgart (Germany)	3–2	(Poland) PGE Rysice Rzeszów	21–25	20–25	25–19	25–14	15–9	106–92	P2 Report
11 Jan	20:00	Asterix Avo Beveren (Belgium)	0–3	(Italy) A. Carraro Imoco Conegliano	11–25	14–25	14–25			39–75	P2 Report
16 Jan	19:00	Allianz MTV Stuttgart (Germany)	3–0	(Belgium) Asterix Avo Beveren	25–14	25–13	25–16			75–43	P2 Report
16 Jan	20:30	A. Carraro Imoco Conegliano (Italy)	3–1	(Poland) PGE Rysice Rzeszów	25–16	23–25	25–16	25–11		98–68	P2 Report

=== Pool E ===
Pos	Team	Pld	W	L	Pts	SW	SL	SR	SPW	SPL	SPR	Qualification
1	(Poland) ŁKS Commercecon Łódź	6	4	2	11	15	10	1.500	555	530	1.047	Quarterfinals
2	(Ukraine) SC "Prometey" Dnipro	6	3	3	9	11	13	0.846	525	525	1.000	Playoffs
3	(France) Volero Le Cannet	6	3	3	8	12	13	0.923	525	536	0.979	CEV Cup
4	(Romania) CS Volei Alba Blaj	6	2	4	8	11	13	0.846	514	528	0.973	

Source: CEV

Date	Time		Score		Set 1	Set 2	Set 3	Set 4	Set 5	Total	Report
7 Nov	20:00	Volero Le Cannet (France)	3–0	(Ukraine) SC "Prometey" Dnipro	25–20	25–22	25–20			75–62	P2 Report
8 Nov	20:30	ŁKS Commercecon Łódź (Poland)	1–3	(Romania) CS Volei Alba Blaj	23–25	25–19	29–31	17–25		94–100	P2 Report
15 Nov	18:00	SC "Prometey" Dnipro (Ukraine)	0–3	(Poland) ŁKS Commercecon Łódź	20–25	17–25	23–25			60–75	P2 Report
15 Nov	18:00	CS Volei Alba Blaj (Romania)	2–3	(France) Volero Le Cannet	18–25	25–22	25–15	20–25	13–15	101–102	P2 Report
29 Nov	18:00	CS Volei Alba Blaj (Romania)	2–3	(Ukraine) SC "Prometey" Dnipro	23–25	25–21	25–18	18–25	8–15	99–104	P2 Report
30 Nov	20:30	Volero Le Cannet (France)	3–2	(Poland) ŁKS Commercecon Łódź	23–25	25–18	25–15	20–25	15–7	108–90	P2 Report
5 Dec	18:00	ŁKS Commercecon Łódź (Poland)	3–2	(Ukraine) SC "Prometey" Dnipro	25–23	22–25	28–26	23–25	15–10	113–109	P2 Report
5 Dec	20:00	Volero Le Cannet (France)	0–3	(Romania) CS Volei Alba Blaj	23–25	24–26	15–25			62–76	P2 Report
11 Jan	18:00	CS Volei Alba Blaj (Romania)	0–3	(Poland) ŁKS Commercecon Łódź	16–25	20–25	14–25			50–75	P2 Report
11 Jan	18:00	SC "Prometey" Dnipro (Ukraine)	3–1	(France) Volero Le Cannet	25–20	25–13	24–26	25–16		99–75	P2 Report
16 Jan	18:00	SC "Prometey" Dnipro (Ukraine)	3–1	(Romania) CS Volei Alba Blaj	25–22	25–20	16–25	25–21		91–88	P2 Report
16 Jan	20:30	ŁKS Commercecon Łódź (Poland)	3–2	(France) Volero Le Cannet	19–25	25–21	24–26	25–20	15–11	108–103	P2 Report

=== Ranking of first-placed teams ===
Pos	Pool	Team	Pld	W	L	Pts	SW	SL	SR	SPW	SPL	SPR	Qualification
1	C	(Turkey) Fenerbahçe Opet Istanbul	6	6	0	18	18	0	MAX	451	331	1.363	Quarterfinals
2	B	(Italy) Savino Del Bene Scandicci	6	6	0	18	18	2	9.000	493	377	1.308	Quarterfinals
3	D	(Italy) A. Carraro Imoco Conegliano	6	6	0	18	18	3	6.000	516	384	1.344	Quarterfinals
4	A	(Italy) Allianz Vero Volley Milano	6	5	1	16	17	4	4.250	492	366	1.344	Quarterfinals
5	E	(Poland) ŁKS Commercecon Łódź	6	4	2	11	15	10	1.500	555	530	1.047	Quarterfinals

=== Ranking of second-placed teams ===
Pos	Pool	Team	Pld	W	L	Pts	SW	SL	SR	SPW	SPL	SPR	Qualification
1	A	(Turkey) VakıfBank Istanbul	6	5	1	14	15	6	2.500	480	424	1.132	Playoffs
2	B	(Turkey) Eczacıbaşı Dynavit Istanbul	6	4	2	12	14	7	2.000	503	441	1.141	Playoffs
3	C	(Germany) SC Potsdam	6	4	2	11	12	9	1.333	463	457	1.013	Playoffs
4	D	(Germany) Allianz MTV Stuttgart	6	3	3	9	12	11	1.091	504	466	1.082	Playoffs
5	E	(Ukraine) SC "Prometey" Dnipro	6	3	3	9	11	13	0.846	525	525	1.000	Playoffs

=== Ranking of third-placed teams ===
Pos	Pool	Team	Pld	W	L	Pts	SW	SL	SR	SPW	SPL	SPR	Qualification
1	D	(Poland) PGE Rysice Rzeszów	6	3	3	9	13	13	1.000	543	572	0.949	Playoffs
2	E	(France) Volero Le Cannet	6	3	3	8	12	13	0.923	525	536	0.979	CEV Cup
3	C	(Poland) Grot Budowlani Łódź	6	2	4	6	7	13	0.538	427	461	0.926	CEV Cup
4	A	(Serbia) Jedinstvo Stara Pazova	6	2	4	5	7	15	0.467	427	495	0.863	CEV Cup
5	B	(Hungary) Vasas Óbuda Budapest	6	1	5	4	6	15	0.400	416	483	0.861	CEV Cup

== Final round ==
- All times are local.
- Aggregate score is counted as follows: 3 points for 3–0 or 3–1 win, 2 points for 3–2 win, 1 point for 2–3 loss.
- In case the teams are tied after two legs, a Golden Set is played immediately at the completion of the second leg.

Playoffs
(Poland) PGE Rysice Rzeszów	0	0
(Turkey) VakıfBank Istanbul	3	3
(Ukraine) SC "Prometey" Dnipro	0	1
(Turkey) Eczacıbaşı Dynavit Istanbul	3	3
(Germany) Allianz MTV Stuttgart	3	3
(Germany) SC Potsdam	0	0

Quarterfinals
(Turkey) VakıfBank Istanbul	1	1
(Italy) A. Carraro Imoco Conegliano	3	3
(Turkey) Eczacıbaşı Dynavit Istanbul	3	3
(Italy) Savino Del Bene Scandicci	2	2
(Poland) ŁKS Commercecon Łódź	1	0
(Italy) Allianz Vero Volley Milano	3	3
(Germany) Allianz MTV Stuttgart	3	1
(Turkey) Fenerbahçe Opet Istanbul	2	3

Semifinals
(Italy) A. Carraro Imoco Conegliano	3	3
(Turkey) Eczacıbaşı Dynavit Istanbul	2	1
(Italy) Allianz Vero Volley Milano	3	1	15
(Turkey) Fenerbahçe Opet Istanbul	0	3	11

Final
(Italy) A. Carraro Imoco Conegliano	3
(Italy) Allianz Vero Volley Milano	2

=== Playoffs ===
Team 1	Agg.	Team 2	1st leg	2nd leg
PGE Rysice Rzeszów (Poland)	0–6	(Turkey) VakıfBank Istanbul	0–3	0–3
SC "Prometey" Dnipro (Ukraine)	0–6	(Turkey) Eczacıbaşı Dynavit Istanbul	0–3	1–3
Allianz MTV Stuttgart (Germany)	6–0	(Germany) SC Potsdam	3–0	3–0

Date	Time		Score		Set 1	Set 2	Set 3	Set 4	Set 5	Total	Report
First leg
30 Jan	20:30	PGE Rysice Rzeszów (Poland)	0–3	(Turkey) VakıfBank Istanbul	20–25	12–25	26–28			58–78	P2 Report
1 Feb	18:00	SC "Prometey" Dnipro (Ukraine)	0–3	(Turkey) Eczacıbaşı Dynavit Istanbul	15–25	13–25	16–25			44–75	P2 Report
1 Feb	19:00	Allianz MTV Stuttgart (Germany)	3–0	(Germany) SC Potsdam	25–18	27–25	25–19			77–62	P2 Report
Second leg
8 Feb	19:30	VakıfBank Istanbul (Turkey)	3–0	(Poland) PGE Rysice Rzeszów	25–12	25–18	25–23			75–53	P2 Report
7 Feb	17:00	Eczacıbaşı Dynavit Istanbul (Turkey)	3–1	(Ukraine) SC "Prometey" Dnipro	25–20	25–15	23–25	25–16		98–76	P2 Report
7 Feb	19:00	SC Potsdam (Germany)	0–3	(Germany) Allianz MTV Stuttgart	19–25	24–26	22–25			65–76	P2 Report

=== Quarterfinals ===
Team 1	Agg.	Team 2	1st leg	2nd leg
VakıfBank Istanbul (Turkey)	0–6	(Italy) A. Carraro Imoco Conegliano	1–3	1–3
Eczacıbaşı Dynavit Istanbul (Turkey)	4–2	(Italy) Savino Del Bene Scandicci	3–2	3–2
ŁKS Commercecon Łódź (Poland)	0–6	(Italy) Allianz Vero Volley Milano	1–3	0–3
Allianz MTV Stuttgart (Germany)	2–4	(Turkey) Fenerbahçe Opet Istanbul	3–2	1–3

Date	Time		Score		Set 1	Set 2	Set 3	Set 4	Set 5	Total	Report
First leg
20 Feb	19:30	VakıfBank Istanbul (Turkey)	1–3	(Italy) A. Carraro Imoco Conegliano	25–23	17–25	18–25	18–25		78–98	P2 Report
21 Feb	19:00	Eczacıbaşı Dynavit Istanbul (Turkey)	3–2	(Italy) Savino Del Bene Scandicci	23–25	25–21	24–26	25–17	15–10	112–99	P2 Report
20 Feb	18:00	ŁKS Commercecon Łódź (Poland)	1–3	(Italy) Allianz Vero Volley Milano	18–25	25–14	18–25	14–25		75–89	P2 Report
20 Feb	19:00	Allianz MTV Stuttgart (Germany)	3–2	(Turkey) Fenerbahçe Opet Istanbul	22–25	26–24	19–25	25–20	15–10	107–104	P2 Report
Second leg
29 Feb	18:30	A. Carraro Imoco Conegliano (Italy)	3–1	(Turkey) VakıfBank Istanbul	20–25	25–18	25–19	25–16		95–78	P2 Report
28 Feb	20:00	Savino Del Bene Scandicci (Italy)	2–3	(Turkey) Eczacıbaşı Dynavit Istanbul	25–27	25–20	25–18	22–25	12–15	109–105	P2 Report
29 Feb	20:00	Allianz Vero Volley Milano (Italy)	3–0	(Poland) ŁKS Commercecon Łódź	25–21	25–14	25–23			75–58	P2 Report
28 Feb	20:00	Fenerbahçe Opet Istanbul (Turkey)	3–1	(Germany) Allianz MTV Stuttgart	25–15	25–15	23–25	25–19		98–74	P2 Report

=== Semifinals ===
Team 1	Agg.	Team 2	1st leg	2nd leg
A. Carraro Imoco Conegliano (Italy)	5–1	(Turkey) Eczacıbaşı Dynavit Istanbul	3–2	3–1
Allianz Vero Volley Milano (Italy)	3–3	(Turkey) Fenerbahçe Opet Istanbul	3–0	1–3

Date	Time		Score		Set 1	Set 2	Set 3	Set 4	Set 5	Total	Report
First leg
14 Mar	20:30	A. Carraro Imoco Conegliano (Italy)	3–2	(Turkey) Eczacıbaşı Dynavit Istanbul	26–28	20–25	25–14	25–22	18–16	114–105	P2 Report
12 Mar	20:00	Allianz Vero Volley Milano (Italy)	3–0	(Turkey) Fenerbahçe Opet Istanbul	25–21	27–25	25–20			77–66	P2 Report
Second leg
20 Mar	19:00	Eczacıbaşı Dynavit Istanbul (Turkey)	1–3	(Italy) A. Carraro Imoco Conegliano	17–25	15–25	26–24	16–25		74–99	P2 Report
19 Mar	20:00	Fenerbahçe Opet Istanbul (Turkey)	3–1	(Italy) Allianz Vero Volley Milano	25–15	26–28	25–22	25–23		101–88	P2 Report
Golden Set
19 Mar	20:00	Fenerbahçe Opet Istanbul (Turkey)	11–15	(Italy) Allianz Vero Volley Milano							P2 Report

== Final ==
- Place: Antalya Sports Hall, Antalya
- Time: Turkey Time (UTC+03:00).

Date	Time		Score		Set 1	Set 2	Set 3	Set 4	Set 5	Total	Report
5 May	20:00	A. Carraro Imoco Conegliano (Italy)	3–2	(Italy) Allianz Vero Volley Milano	25–14	23–25	25–19	19–25	15–9	107–92	P2 Report

== See also ==
- 2023–24 CEV Champions League
- 2023–24 CEV Cup
- 2023–24 CEV Challenge Cup
- 2023–24 Women's CEV Cup
- 2023–24 CEV Women's Challenge Cup
