= Žiga Donik =

Slovenian volleyball player (born 1995)

Personal information
- Nationality: Slovenian
- Born: 21 September 1995 (age 31) Maribor, Slovenia
- Height: 1.92 m (6 ft 4 in)

Volleyball information
- Position: Wing spiker
- Current club: Maribor
- Number: 11

Career
- Years: Team
- 2012–2015 2015–2017 2017–2018 2018–: Maribor; ACH Volley; ACH Črnuče; Maribor

National team
- Years: Team
- 2016: Slovenia

Žiga Donik (born 21 September 1995) is a Slovenian volleyball player who plays for Maribor. In 2016, he was included on the preliminary squad of the Slovenia national team for the 2016 FIVB Volleyball World League.
