= Croatian Volleyball Federation =

Governing body of volleyball in Croatia

The Croatian Volleyball Federation (Croatian: Hrvatski odbojkaški savez, HOS) is the governing body of volleyball in Croatia. It is based in Zagreb.

It organizes the following volleyball leagues:

- 1A Men's Volleyball League
- 1B Men's Volleyball League
- 1A Women's Volleyball League
- 1B Women's Volleyball League

It also organizes the Croatian national volleyball team and the Croatian national women's volleyball team. The HOS was formed in 1946. It is a member of the Fédération Internationale de Volleyball and the Confédération Européenne de Volleyball.
