= OK OTP Banka Branik =

Women's volleyball club

OTP Banka Branik
- Full name: Odbojkarski klub OTP Banka Branik
- Nickname: Bankirke (The Bankers)
- Founded: 1946; 80 years ago (as Polet)
- Ground: Tabor Hall (Capacity: 3,261)
- Manager: Žiga Kos
- Captain: Urška Cikač
- League: Slovenian Volleyball League
- 2025−26: Regular season: 1st Playoffs: Champions
- Website: Club home page
- Championships: 1992, 1993, 1996, 1998, 1999, 2000, 2001, 2002, 2009, 2011, 2012, 2013, 2014, 2017, 2018, 2019, 2025, 2026

Uniforms
Home	Away

Odbojkarski klub OTP Banka Branik (English: OTP Banka Branik Volleyball Club), commonly referred to as OTP Banka Branik, is a professional women's volleyball team based in Maribor that competes in the Slovenian Volleyball League. Formed in 1946, they are the most successful Slovenian women's volleyball team, winning the Slovenian League 18 times, Slovenian Cup 21 times and the regional MEVZA League 4 times. Before Slovenia's independence in 1991, the team won the Yugoslav Championship four times and reached the Yugoslav Cup final on eight occasions.

Branik's most notable international results include participation in the main phase of the CEV Women's Champions League, and reaching the final four tournament of the Women's CEV Cup.

== History ==
=== Origins of volleyball in Maribor ===
Before World War II, the city of Maribor emerged as a major centre for volleyball in the Kingdom of Yugoslavia. The sport was first introduced to the city in 1924 by gymnasts from the Sokol-matica sports club. In 1931, Maribor hosted the inaugural national championship, where the Sokol-matica senior women's team won the national title. Over the subsequent years, the team secured several additional titles, concluding with the final pre-war championship in 1940, when both the men's and women's selections won national titles. During the 1930s, the women's selection was integrated into 1. slovenski športni klub Maribor (English: First Slovene Sports Club Maribor), commonly known as 1. SSK Maribor. The club serves as the historical predecessor to the modern Branik Sports Association.

=== Foundation, early success and decline ===
Following the end of World War II in 1945, 1. SSK Maribor and Sokol-matica merged to form a new sports organization named Fizkulturno društvo Maribor (FD Maribor). During the inaugural edition of the Yugoslav Volleyball Championship in 1945, the Slovenian national team—composed primarily of players from Maribor—won the women's title. On 27 September 1946, the parent organization was renamed Fizkulturno društvo Polet (FD Polet). The first club-based Yugoslav national championship was held that same season, with Polet winning its first title. In 1947 and 1948, Polet finished as runners-up behind another Slovenian team, Enotnost Ljubljana.

The team was renamed to Branik in 1952, when the sports organization SŠD Polet and the football club NK Branik Maribor merged to form Mariborsko športno društvo Branik (Maribor Sports Association Branik), or simply MŠD Branik. Featuring a roster of both young and experienced players, the team secured its second national title in 1953, finishing ahead of ŽOK Partizan. Over the following two seasons, Branik finished as runners-up before being relegated from the top division in 1959.

Following the club's second national title, several older and more experienced players retired from competitive sports. Consequently, the team achieved more modest results in the national championships until the women's volleyball section ultimately disbanded in 1968. However, in the autumn of 1970, the women's team was re-established, with physical education professor Edvard Dolinšek appointed as head coach.

=== National champions of Yugoslavia ===
In 1976, SR Slovenia adopted a sports resolution known as the Portoroški sklepi (Portorož Conclusions), which mandated the reorganization of sports associations across the republic. As a result, Branik merged with fellow Maribor-based club Železničar. This reorganization initiated a new era for the team, as Branik subsequently earned promotion to the Yugoslav Second League, finishing as runners-up during the 1977–78 season. After finishing as runners-up once again the following season, Branik secured first place in the 1979–80 campaign. In the subsequent promotion play-offs, the team defeated the club from Gradačac to earn promotion back to the Yugoslav First League.

Progression
Year	Position
1981	6th
1982	5th
1983	3rd
1984	3rd
1985	1st
1986	1st

In 1982, the team was renamed Paloma Branik following a sponsorship agreement with the Paloma tissue paper company based in nearby Sladki Vrh. In the 1984–85 season, Paloma Branik captured the Yugoslav national title for the third time in club history, marking their first championship in 32 years. The decisive match was played against Partizan in the newly built Tabor Hall in front of 4,000 spectators, resulting in a 3–0 victory for Branik. The following season, Paloma Branik successfully defended their title to claim their fourth and final Yugoslav championship prior to the breakup of the country. Between 1983 and 1991, Paloma Branik reached the final of the Yugoslav Cup eight times, finishing as runners-up on each occasion. In the 1980s, the team began competing in international competitions organized by the European Volleyball Confederation. As Yugoslav representatives, Paloma Branik competed in the CEV Champions Cup during the 1985–86 and 1986–87 seasons. The club was eliminated in the first round both times, losing to CSKA Moscow and CSKA Sofia, respectively.

=== Slovenian League domination ===
Following Slovenia's independence from SFR Yugoslavia in 1991, Paloma Branik won the inaugural title of the newly established Slovenian Women's Volleyball League during the 1991–92 season. That same season, the team also captured the inaugural Slovenian Women's Volleyball Cup, securing a domestic double. As national champions, Branik qualified for the 1992–93 edition of the CEV Champions Cup, where the team was eliminated in the first round by Hungarian club Tungsram SC. During the 1996–97 and 1999–2000 seasons, Branik reached the group stage of the competition but finished winless, placing bottom of their group both times.

In the 2000–01 season, Branik reached the semi-finals of the CEV Women's Top Teams Cup, the second-tier continental competition for European women's volleyball clubs. In the Final Four tournament held in Vienna, the team was eliminated by the tournament hosts, SVS Post Schwechat, by a score of 3–1. In the subsequent third-place play-off, Branik lost to Ukrainian club Dynamo Odessa, finishing the competition in fourth place.

During the first decade following Slovenian independence, Branik established itself as the country's most successful club, winning eight national championships between 1992 and 2002. However, following their 2002 championship, the team entered a title drought and did not secure another national league title until the 2008–09 season. In the 2010s, Branik re-established its domestic dominance by winning seven national championships over a nine-season span between 2011 and 2019.

In 2010, Branik captured its first title in the regional MEVZA League. The team subsequently won three more MEVZA League titles in 2012, 2013, and 2015.

=== Name changes ===
Club names through history:

- Polet (1946–1952)
- Branik (1952–1982)
- Paloma Branik (1982–1995)
- Infond Branik (1995–1998)
- Infond Meltal Branik (1998–2000)
- NKBM Meltal Maribor (2000–2001)
- Nova KBM Branik (2001–2024)
- OTP Banka Branik (2024–present)

== Arena ==
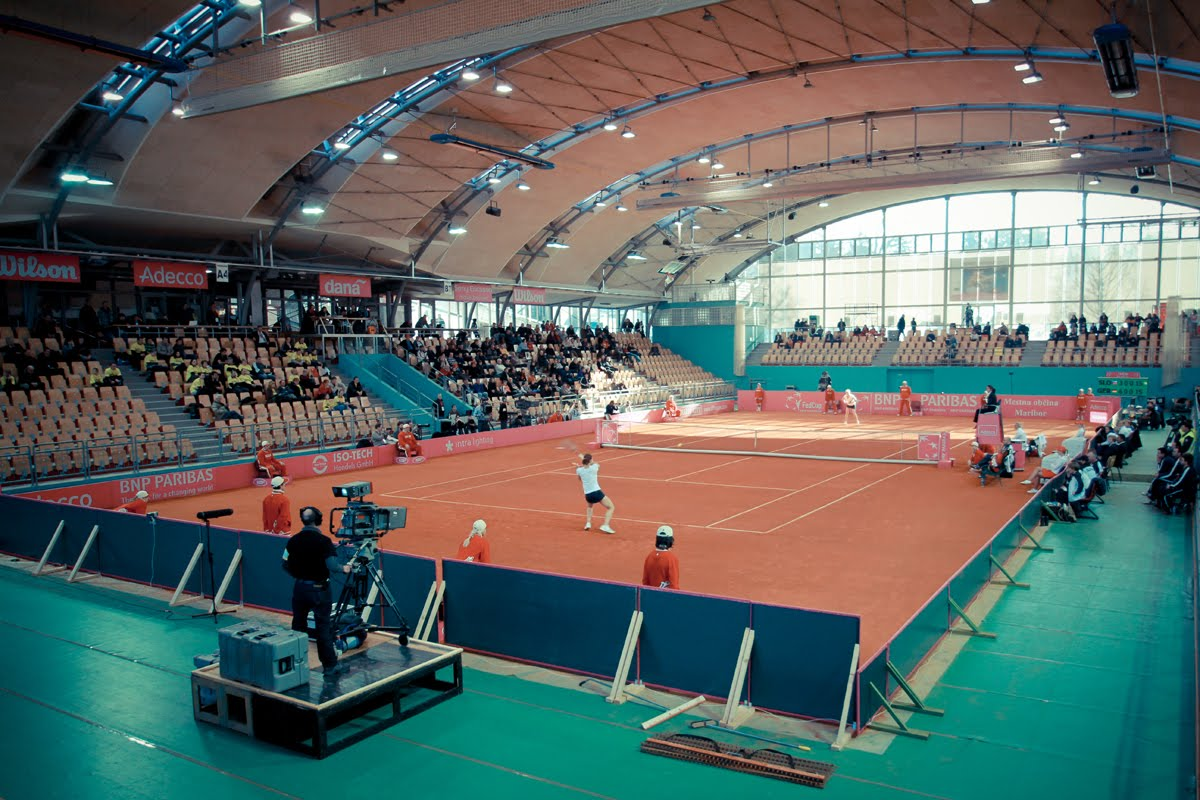
Lukna Sports Hall

From 1984 to 2006, the club played its home matches at Tabor Hall in Maribor. In the 2006–07 season, they moved to the newly constructed Lukna Sports Hall, a 2,100-capacity venue also located in the city. After nearly 20 years of playing at Lukna, OTP Banka Branik permanently returned to the 3,261-capacity Tabor Hall in early 2025.

== Players ==
=== 2026−27 team ===
Number	Name	Birthyear	Height (cm)	Position
3	(Slovenia) Žana Godec	2004	180	Wing spiker
4	(Slovenia) Taja Bingo	2008	185	Middle blocker
5	(Bulgaria) Dariya Ivanova	2003	185	Wing spiker
7	(Slovenia) Ronja Štampar	2002	183	Middle blocker
8	(Slovenia) Gaja Dragšič	2008	172	Wing spiker
9	(Croatia) Maša Mlinar	2007	180	Wing spiker
12	(Slovenia) Urška Cikač	2004	168	Libero
13	(Slovenia) Anja Farkaš	2004	175	Setter
14	(Slovenia) Isa Ramić	2004	188	Opposite
16	(United States) Kamaluhia Garcia	2005	183	Opposite
17	(Slovenia) Naja Kajzersperger	2007	188	Middle blocker
18	(Slovenia) Žana Ivana Halužan Sagadin	2004	181	Setter
19	(Slovenia) Lara Zelko	2006	188	Opposite

Head coach: Žiga Kos
Assistant coaches: Dejan Korotaj, Dejan Pušnik

Source: Volleyball Federation of Slovenia

== Honours ==
=== Domestic ===
- Yugoslav Volleyball Championship
  - Winners (4): 1946, 1953, 1984–85, 1985–86
- Slovenian Volleyball League
  - Winners (18): 1991–92, 1992–93, 1995–96, 1997–98, 1998–99, 1999–2000, 2000–01, 2001–02, 2008–09, 2010–11, 2011–12, 2012–13, 2013–14, 2016–17, 2017–18, 2018–19, 2024–25, 2025–26
- Slovenian Volleyball Cup
  - Winners (21): 1991–92, 1992–93, 1993–94, 1995–96, 1997–98, 1998–99, 1999–2000, 2000–01, 2001–02, 2002–03, 2009–10, 2010–11, 2011–12, 2014–15, 2015–16, 2016–17, 2017–18, 2019–20, 2022–23, 2023–24, 2025–26

=== Regional ===
- MEVZA League
  - Winners (4): 2009–10, 2011–12, 2012–13, 2014–15
