= OK Maribor =

Slovenian volleyball club

i-Vent Maribor
- Full name: Odbojkarski klub i-Vent Maribor
- Founded: 1976; 50 years ago
- Ground: Tabor Hall; Maribor, Slovenia (Capacity: 3,261)
- Chairman: Milan Kuster
- Manager: Sebastijan Škorc
- Captain: Žiga Donik
- League: Slovenian Volleyball League
- 2025−26: Regular season: 4th Playoffs: Quarterfinals
- Website: Club home page
- Championships: 1992, 1993, 2021

Uniforms
Home	Away

Odbojkarski klub Maribor (English: Maribor Volleyball Club) or simply OK Maribor, known as i-Vent Maribor due to sponsorship reasons, is a professional men's volleyball club based in Maribor, Slovenia. It competes in the Slovenian Volleyball League, the top division of Slovenian volleyball. Founded in 1976, the club has won the Slovenian national championship three times (1992, 1993 and 2021) and the Slovenian national cup four times (1992, 1994, 1995 and 2006). The team plays its home matches at Tabor Hall, which has a seating capacity of 3,261.

== History ==
=== Origins of volleyball in Maribor ===
The city of Maribor played a foundational role in the development of Slovenian volleyball. Members of the Sokol-matica gymnastics club were the first to play the sport as early as 1924. From 1931, when Maribor hosted the first national championship, until the beginning of World War II, Maribor volleyball remained at the very top of the Yugoslav scene; the women's team was undefeated, while the men's team consistently ranked among the best. Immediately after World War II, in June 1945, a volleyball section was officially established within the Železničar Sports Association (ŽŠD Maribor). The team competed in the inaugural Slovenian national championship in 1946, finishing in fourth place. In 1947, the volleyball department of ŽŠD reorganized independently as Odbojkarski klub Železničar (English: Železničar Volleyball Club; literally 'Railroaders Volleyball Club'). In 1951, the team was relegated from the Slovenian top tier, and it took another twelve years before the club, coached by Štefan Podlesnik, returned to the top flight. Two years later, in 1965, Železničar won the Slovenian Republic championship, a feat they repeated in 1970. During this era, the men's team of the fellow Maribor-based club, Branik, competed in the Yugoslav top division and won the Yugoslav championship in 1955.

=== Reorganization and Yugoslav competitions (1976–1991) ===
Following a structural reorganization of Maribor's volleyball sports clubs in 1976, Železničar merged with its city rival, Branik, to become Odbojkarski klub Maribor (English: Maribor Volleyball Club). In 1980, Maribor won the Yugoslav second division and qualified for the highest level of Yugoslav volleyball, the Yugoslav Volleyball Championship. The club was relegated during its first season in the top division, but won the second division the following year to secure immediate promotion back to the top flight. Maribor was also the runner-up of the Yugoslav Cup in 1983. The club remained in the top division until 1989, when the Yugoslav League was reorganized and reduced to eight teams. Maribor immediately returned to the top tier after winning the A2 Division in 1990, but dropped out of the Yugoslav top flight the following year. This proved to be the club's final season in the league before the breakup of Yugoslavia.

=== Independence and domestic competitions (1991–present) ===
In 1991, Slovenia gained independence from Yugoslavia, and the Volleyball Federation of Slovenia established its own league system. OK Maribor won the first two editions of the newly established Slovenian Volleyball League, becoming back-to-back national champions in 1992 and 1993. As Slovenian champions, the team competed in the 1992–93 edition of the CEV European Champions Cup, where they were eliminated in the first round by the Swiss team Lausanne UC. During the 1990s, Maribor also won the national cup three times and was the league runner-up on several occasions. In January 2006, Maribor, competing under the sponsorship name Prevent Gradnje IGM, won its fourth national cup title by defeating Salonit Anhovo in the final, the first major trophy won by the club in eleven years.

Between 2009 and 2019, the club went through a period of stagnation, never finishing higher than fourth in the league. In 2009–10, Maribor even finished in the last, 12th place. In December 2019, the club signed a sponsorship deal with Merkur and changed its name to Merkur Maribor. In 2021, Maribor secured its third national championship by defeating ACH Volley 3–2 in the finals, preventing the Ljubljana-based club from winning a 17th consecutive title.

=== Name changes ===
Throughout its history, OK Maribor has been named after their main sponsor on numerous occasions:

- Stavbar Maribor (1979–1984)
- Stavbar/MTT Maribor (1984–1989)
- Tehno Mobil (1989–1990)
- Vileda Maribor (1990–1994)
- Bella Viola Maribor (1994–1995)
- Marles Maribor (1995–1996)
- Gradis Maribor (1997–1998)
- Stavbar IGM Maribor (1998–2004)
- Prevent Gradnje IGM (2004–2007)
- MTB Maribor (2008–2010)
- Lunos Maribor (2013–2015)
- Merkur Maribor (2019–2023)
- i-Vent Maribor (2024–present)

== Season-by-season records ==
Key

- PR = Preliminary round
- Q32 = Qualification round (32nd finals)
- R2 = Second round
- R3 = Third round
- MP = Main phase
- GS = Group stage
- R16 = Round of 16
- R32 = Round of 32
- QF = Quarter-final

Season	Tier	Position	Cup	Europe	
1991–92	1	Champions	Winners	—N/a	
1992–93	1	Champions	Runners-up	CEV European Champions Cup	PR
1993–94	1	Runners-up	Winners	CEV European Champions Cup	R16
1994–95	1	3rd	Winners	CEV Cup Winners' Cup	QF
1995–96	1	Runners-up	Runners-up	CEV Cup Winners' Cup	GS
1996–97	1	Runners-up	Runners-up	CEV Cup Winners' Cup	GS
1997–98	1	3rd	Semi-final	CEV Cup Winners' Cup	GS
1998–99	1	Runners-up	Semi-final	CEV Cup	MP
1999–00	1	5th	Runners-up	CEV Cup	MP
2000–01	1	6th	Quarter-final	—N/a	
2001–02	1	3rd	Quarter-final	CEV Cup	MP
2002–03	1	Runners-up	Semi-final	CEV Cup	MP
2003–04	1	5th	Semi-final	CEV Cup	MP
2004–05	1	5th	Round of 16	—N/a	
2005–06	1	Runners-up	Winners	—N/a	
2006–07	1	Runners-up	Quarter-final	CEV Cup	R16
2006–07	1	Runners-up	Quarter-final	CEV Top Teams Cup	PR
2007–08	1	3rd	Quarter-final	CEV Challenge Cup	R3
2007–08	1	3rd	Quarter-final	CEV Cup	R32
2008–09	1	6th	Quarter-final	CEV Challenge Cup	R2
2009–10	1	12th	Round of 16	—N/a	
2010–11	1	10th	Fourth round	—N/a	
2011–12	1	8th	Round of 16	—N/a	
2012–13	1	5th	Semi-final	—N/a	
2013–14	1	5th	Semi-final	—N/a	
2014–15	1	7th	Round of 16	—N/a	
2015–16	1	5th	Quarter-final	—N/a	
2016–17	1	5th	Round of 16	—N/a	
2017–18	1	5th	Quarter-final	—N/a	
2018–19	1	4th	Quarter-final	—N/a	
2019–20	1	3rd	Runners-up	—N/a	
2020–21	1	Champions	Quarter-final	—N/a	
2021–22	1	3rd	Runners-up	CEV Champions League	GS
2022–23	1	3rd	Semi-final	CEV Challenge Cup	Q32
2023–24	1	3rd	Runners-up	CEV Challenge Cup	Q32
2024–25	1	5th	Runners-up	CEV Volleyball Cup	Q32
2025–26	1	6th	Quarter-final	CEV Challenge Cup	R32

== Players ==
=== 2026−27 team ===
Number	Name	Birthdate	Height (cm)	Position
2	(Slovenia) Valentin Predan	29 September 2009 (age 17)	186	Setter
3	(Slovenia) Timotej Vodušek	19 November 2004 (age 21)	195	Middle blocker
4	(Slovenia) Bor Križanič	25 March 2005 (age 21)	200	Middle blocker
6	(Slovenia) Tai Dežman	25 June 2008 (age 18)	197	Middle blocker
8	(Slovenia) Jakob Breznik	6 July 2007 (age 19)	196	Middle blocker
9	(Slovenia) Jakob Špes Podbregar	16 December 2005 (age 20)	193	Wing spiker
10	(Denmark) Hjalmer Elmbæk Madsen	4 November 2005 (age 21)	200	Wing spiker
11	(Slovenia) Žiga Donik	21 September 1995 (age 31)	192	Wing spiker
13	(Czech Republic) Matěj Šmídl	25 February 1997 (age 29)	205	Opposite
14	(Slovenia) Jan Ručigaj	14 June 2008 (age 18)	192	Opposite
15	(Slovenia) Jan Hribernik	19 February 2006 (age 20)	183	Libero
17	(Slovenia) Maj Škorc	31 December 2008 (age 17)	178	Libero
32	(Slovenia) Mark Lačen	13 December 2007 (age 18)	183	Setter
99	(Slovenia) Liam Klinger	2 July 2008 (age 18)	190	Wing spiker

Head coach: Sebastijan Škorc
Assistant coach: Alen Kranjc

Sources: Volleyball Federation of Slovenia and CEV

== Honours ==
- Slovenian Volleyball League
  - Winners (3): 1991–92, 1992–93, 2020–21
  - Runners-up (7): 1993–94, 1995–96, 1996–97, 1998–99, 2002–03, 2005–06, 2006–07
- Slovenian Cup
  - Winners (4): 1991–92, 1993–94, 1994–95, 2005–06
  - Runners-up (8): 1992–93, 1995–96, 1996–97, 1999–2000, 2019–20, 2021–22, 2023–24, 2024–25
- MEVZA League
  - Runners-up (2): 2020–21, 2023–24

== Managers ==
List of all managers since 1976.

- Milan Primec (1976–1986)
- Zdravko Obersnel (1986–1987)
- Luka Lobnik (1987–1989)
- Dragutin Baltić (1989–1990)
- Marko Zadražnik (1990–1991)
- Dragutin Baltić (1991–1996)
- Radovan Malević (1996–1998)
- Viki Krevsel (1998)
- Bogdan Sretenović (1998)
- Bruno Najdič (1998–2000)
- Teo Pajnik (2000–2002)
- Peter Možič (2002–2003)
- Radovan Gačić (2003–2004)
- Dragutin Baltić (2004–2006)
- Zoran Nikolić (2006–2007)
- Teo Pajnik (2007–2008)
- Peter Primec (2008)
- Teo Pajnik (2009–2010)
- Matjaž Hafner (2010)
- Dragutin Baltić (2010)
- Aleksandar Bošković (2011)
- Sebastijan Škorc (2011–2015)
- Grega Horvat (2015–2016)
- Matevž Kamnik (2016–2017)
- Sebastijan Škorc (2017–present)
