= Slovenian Women's Volleyball League =

Superliga ženske
- Sport: Volleyball
- Founded: 1991
- Administrator: Volleyball Federation of Slovenia
- No. of teams: 10
- Country: Slovenia
- Continent: Europe (CEV)
- Most recent champion: OTP Banka Branik (18th title) (2025–26)
- Most titles: OTP Banka Branik (18 titles)
- Broadcaster: Sportklub
- Level on pyramid: 1
- Domestic cup: Slovenian Cup
- International cups: CEV Champions League; CEV Cup; CEV Challenge Cup
- Website: Official website

The Slovenian Women's Volleyball Super League, also known as Sportklub Superliga ženske due to sponsorship reasons, is the highest level of women's volleyball in Slovenia, organized by the Volleyball Federation of Slovenia. The league was founded in 1991 and consists of ten teams.

== List of champions ==
Season	Champions	Runners-up
1991–92	Paloma Branik	
1992–93	Paloma Branik	
1993–94	Abes Trade Celje	Paloma Branik
1994–95	Klima Commerce Bled	Infond Branik
1995–96	Infond Branik	Bank Austria Bled
1996–97	Kemiplas Koper	Infond Branik
1997–98	Infond Branik	TPV Novo Mesto
1998–99	Infond Meltal	TPV Novo Mesto
1999–00	Infond Meltal	OK Luka Koper
2000–01	Nova KBM Meltal	OK Luka Koper
2001–02	Nova KBM Branik	Vital Ljubljana
2002–03	OK Gorica	Nova KBM Branik
2003–04	Sladki greh Ljubljana	Nova KBM Branik
2004–05	Sladki greh Ljubljana	OK Gorica
2005–06	TPV Novo Mesto	Nova KBM Branik
2006–07	OK Gorica	TPV Novo Mesto
2007–08	OK Gorica	Nova KBM Branik
2008–09	Nova KBM Branik	OK Gorica
2009–10	Calcit Volleyball	Nova KBM Branik
2010–11	Nova KBM Branik	Calcit Volleyball
2011–12	Nova KBM Branik	Calcit Volleyball
2012–13	Nova KBM Branik	Calcit Volleyball
2013–14	Nova KBM Branik	Calcit Volleyball
2014–15	Calcit Volleyball	Nova KBM Branik
2015–16	Calcit Ljubljana	Nova KBM Branik
2016–17	Nova KBM Branik	Calcit Volleyball
2017–18	Nova KBM Branik	Calcit Volley
2018–19	Nova KBM Branik	Gen-I Volley
2019–20	Calcit Volley	Nova KBM Branik
2020–21	Calcit Volley	Nova KBM Branik
2021–22	Calcit Volley	Nova KBM Branik
2022–23	Calcit Volley	Gen-I Volley
2023–24	Calcit Volley	Nova KBM Branik
2024–25	OTP Banka Branik	Calcit Volley
2025–26	OTP Banka Branik	Calcit Volley

== Titles by club ==
Rank	Club	Titles	Years won
1	OTP Banka Branik	18	1992, 1993, 1996, 1998, 1999, 2000, 2001, 2002, 2009, 2011, 2012, 2013, 2014, 2017, 2018, 2019, 2025, 2026
2	Calcit Volley	8	2010, 2015, 2016, 2020, 2021, 2022, 2023, 2024
3	OK Gorica	3	2003, 2007, 2008
4	Vital Ljubljana	2	2004, 2005
5	OK Celje	1	1994
5	OK Bled	1	1995
5	OK Koper	1	1997
5	TPV Volley Novo Mesto	1	2006
