= MEVZA League =

Regional volleyball league for Middle Europe

- Founded: 2005; 21 years ago
- No. of teams: 9 (men's); 6 (women's)
- Country: Austria; Croatia; Hungary; Montenegro; Slovenia; Ukraine
- Continent: Europe
- Most recent champions: Mursa Osijek (men's); HAOK Mladost (women's) (2025–26 season)
- Website: mevza.org

The Middle European League or MEVZA League is a regional volleyball league, established in 2005 and contested by the club teams from the Middle European Volleyball Zonal Association (MEVZA). In the men's edition, the most successful team is ACH Volley with fourteen titles. Among women, OTP Banka Branik and Calcit Volley are the most successful with four titles each.

The competition is a continuation of the Interleague, which was played in the 1990s before merging into the newly established MEVZA League in 2005.

== List of seasons (men's) ==
=== Finals ===
Season	Winners	Runners-up
2005–06	(Austria) HotVolleys Vienna	(Austria) Hypo Tirol Innsbruck
2006–07	(Slovenia) Autocommerce Bled	(Austria) HotVolleys Vienna
2007–08	(Slovenia) ACH Volley Bled	(Austria) Hypo Tirol Innsbruck
2008–09	(Austria) Hypo Tirol Innsbruck	(Slovenia) ACH Volley
2009–10	(Slovenia) ACH Volley Bled	(Austria) HotVolleys Vienna
2010–11	(Slovenia) ACH Volley Bled	(Austria) Hypo Tirol Innsbruck
2011–12	(Austria) Hypo Tirol Innsbruck	(Slovenia) ACH Volley
2012–13	(Slovenia) ACH Volley Ljubljana	(Austria) Posojilnica Aich/Dob
2013–14	(Slovenia) ACH Volley Ljubljana	(Austria) Posojilnica Aich/Dob
2014–15	(Austria) Hypo Tirol Innsbruck	(Austria) Posojilnica Aich/Dob
2015–16	(Slovenia) ACH Volley Ljubljana	(Austria) Hypo Tirol Innsbruck
2016–17	(Slovenia) ACH Volley Ljubljana	(Austria) Hypo Tirol Innsbruck
2017–18	(Austria) Posojilnica Aich/Dob	(Slovenia) Calcit Volley
2018–19	(Slovenia) ACH Volley Ljubljana	(Austria) Posojilnica Aich/Dob
2019–20	(Slovenia) ACH Volley Ljubljana	(Croatia) HAOK Mladost Zagreb
2020–21	(Slovenia) ACH Volley Ljubljana	(Slovenia) Merkur Maribor
2021–22	(Slovenia) ACH Volley Ljubljana	(Croatia) HAOK Mladost Zagreb
2022–23	(Slovenia) ACH Volley Ljubljana	(Slovenia) Calcit Volley
2023–24	(Slovenia) Calcit Volley	(Slovenia) i-Vent Maribor
2024–25	(Slovenia) ACH Volley Ljubljana	(Croatia) HAOK Mladost Zagreb
2025–26	(Croatia) Mursa Osijek	(Hungary) MÁV Előre SC

=== Performance by club ===
Club	Titles	Winning years
(Slovenia) ACH Volley	14	2007, 2008, 2010, 2011, 2013, 2014, 2016, 2017, 2019, 2020, 2021, 2022, 2023, 2025
(Austria) Hypo Tirol Innsbruck	3	2009, 2012, 2015
(Austria) HotVolleys Vienna	1	2006
(Austria) Posojilnica Aich/Dob	1	2018
(Slovenia) Calcit Volley	1	2024
(Croatia) Mursa Osijek	1	2026

== List of seasons (women's) ==
=== Finals ===
Season	Winners	Runners-up
2005–06	(Slovakia) OMS Senica	(Slovakia) Slavia Bratislava
2006–07	(Slovakia) OMS Senica	(Slovenia) HIT Nova Gorica
2007–08	(Slovenia) HIT Nova Gorica	(Austria) SVS Post Schwechat
2008–09	(Croatia) Rijeka KWSO	(Austria) SVS Post Schwechat
2009–10	(Slovenia) Nova KBM Branik	(Croatia) Split 1700
2010–11	(Czech Republic) Modřanská Prostějov	(Austria) SVS Post Schwechat
2011–12	(Slovenia) Nova KBM Branik	(Austria) SVS Post Schwechat
2012–13	(Slovenia) Nova KBM Branik	(Austria) SVS Post Schwechat
2013–14	(Slovenia) Calcit Kamnik	(Slovenia) Nova KBM Branik
2014–15	(Slovenia) Nova KBM Branik	(Slovenia) Calcit Volleyball
2015–16	(Slovenia) Calcit Volley	(Hungary) Linamar Békéscsabai
2016–17	(Hungary) Linamar Békéscsabai	(Slovenia) Calcit Volley
2017–18	(Hungary) Linamar Békéscsabai	(Czech Republic) Olomouc
2018–19	(Czech Republic) Olomouc	(Slovenia) Nova KBM Branik
2019–20	(Slovenia) Calcit Volley	(Slovenia) Nova KBM Branik
2020–21	Not played	
2021–22	(Hungary) Vasas Óbuda	(Slovenia) Calcit Volley
2022–23	(Hungary) Swietelsky-Békéscsaba	(Slovenia) Nova KBM Branik
2023–24	(Slovenia) Calcit Volley	(Croatia) HAOK Mladost Zagreb
2024–25	(Croatia) HAOK Mladost Zagreb	(Slovenia) Calcit Volley
2025–26 (Note: The Final Four tournament was cancelled; the final standings were determined based on the regular season standings.)	(Croatia) HAOK Mladost Zagreb	(Slovenia) OTP Banka Branik

=== Performance by club ===
Club	Titles	Winning years
(Slovenia) OTP Banka Branik	4	2010, 2012, 2013, 2015
(Slovenia) Calcit Volley	4	2014, 2016, 2020, 2024
(Hungary) Békéscsabai	3	2017, 2018, 2023
(Slovakia) OMS Senica	2	2006, 2007
(Croatia) HAOK Mladost Zagreb	2	2025, 2026
(Slovenia) Gorica	1	2008
(Croatia) Rijeka	1	2009
(Czech Republic) Modřanská Prostějov	1	2011
(Czech Republic) Olomouc	1	2019
(Hungary) Vasas Óbuda	1	2022
