= Calcit Volley (women's) =

Slovenian women's volleyball team from Kamnik

- Full name: Odbojkarski klub Kamnik
- Founded: 1947; 79 years ago
- Ground: Kamnik Sports Hall
- Chairman: Gregor Hribar
- Manager: Špela Ožegovič
- Captain: Anja Maček
- League: Slovenian Volleyball League
- 2025−26: Regular season: 3rd Playoffs: Runners-up
- Website: Club home page
- Championships: 2010, 2015, 2016, 2020, 2021, 2022, 2023, 2024

Uniforms
Home	Away

Odbojkarski klub Kamnik (English: Kamnik Volleyball Club), known as Calcit Volley or Calcit Kamnik due to sponsorship reasons, is a Slovenian women's volleyball team from Kamnik. The team competes in the Slovenian Volleyball League and in MEVZA League.

== History ==
In 2015, the women's section of Calcit Volley merged with OK Vital, relocated from Kamnik to Ljubljana and renamed as Calcit Ljubljana. The club returned to Kamnik after the 2016–17 season.

== Honours ==
- Slovenian Volleyball League
  - Winners (8): 2009–10, 2014–15, 2015–16, 2019–20, 2020–21, 2021–22, 2022–23, 2023–24
- Slovenian Volleyball Cup
  - Winners (5): 2012–13, 2013–14, 2018–19, 2021–22, 2024–25
- MEVZA League
  - Winners (4): 2013–14, 2015–16, 2019–20, 2023–24

== Players ==
=== 2026−27 team ===
Number	Name	Birthyear	Height (cm)	Position
1	(Slovenia) Živa Javornik	2004	176	Wing spiker
2	(Slovenia) Zala Špoljarič	2002	173	Libero
3	(Slovenia) Lara Rituper	2002	182	Middle blocker
5	(Slovenia) Dita Reflak	2009	170	Libero
6	(Slovenia) Tina Topič	2003	180	Setter
7	(Slovenia) Vita Kotnik	2007	176	Opposite
9	(Slovenia) Asja Šen	2003	173	Opposite
12	(Slovenia) Naja Boisa	2003	189	Wing spiker
14	(Slovenia) Sara Sitar	2000	177	Middle blocker
16	(Slovenia) Anja Maček	1998	180	Wing spiker
18	(Slovenia) Hana Gašperlin	2008	172	Setter
19	(Slovenia) Neja Čižman	2004	178	Middle blocker
34	(Slovenia) Eva Albič	2010	179	Wing spiker

Head coach: Špela Ožegovič
Assistant coach: Tjaša Gadža

Source: Volleyball Federation of Slovenia
