= Slovenian Women's Volleyball Cup =

Volleyball competition in Slovenia

- Sport: Volleyball
- Founded: 1991
- Administrator: Volleyball Federation of Slovenia
- Country: Slovenia
- Continent: Europe
- Most recent champion: OTP Banka Branik (21st title)
- Most titles: OTP Banka Branik (21 titles)
- Website: https://www.odbojka.si/

The Slovenian Women's Volleyball Cup is the top annual women's volleyball cup competition in Slovenia, organised by the Volleyball Federation of Slovenia. The first edition was played in the 1991–92 season. OTP Banka Branik is the most successful team with 21 titles.

== List of finals ==
| Season | Winners | Score | Runners-up |
|---|---|---|---|
| 1991–92 | Paloma Branik | 3–0 | Cimos Koper |
| 1992–93 | Paloma Branik | 3–0 | Abes Trade Celje |
| 1993–94 | Paloma Branik | | |
| 1994–95 | Celje | 3–0, 1–3 | Cimos Koper |
| 1995–96 | Infond Branik | 3–0, 3–1 | Celje |
| 1996–97 | Kemiplas Koper | 2–3, 3–1 | TPV Novo Mesto |
| 1997–98 | Infond Branik | 3–2 | Kemiplas Koper |
| 1998–99 | Infond Meltal | 3–0 | Kemiplas Koper |
| 1999–2000 | Infond Meltal | 3–0 | HIT Nova Gorica |
| 2000–01 | Nova KBM Meltal | 3–1 | HIT Nova Gorica |
| 2001–02 | Nova KBM Branik | 3–2 | HIT Nova Gorica |
| 2002–03 | Nova KBM Branik | 3–0 | HIT Nova Gorica |
| 2003–04 | Sladki greh Ljubljana | 3–0 | HIT Nova Gorica |
| 2004–05 | Sladki greh Ljubljana | 3–0 | HIT Nova Gorica |
| 2005–06 | HIT Nova Gorica | 3–0 | Šentvid |
| 2006–07 | HIT Nova Gorica | 3–1 | TPV Novo Mesto |
| 2007–08 | HIT Nova Gorica | 3–1 | Nova KBM Branik |
| 2008–09 | HIT Nova Gorica | 3–1 | Nova KBM Branik |
| 2009–10 | Nova KBM Branik | 3–1 | Calcit Kamnik |
| 2010–11 | Nova KBM Branik | 3–2 | Calcit Volleyball |
| 2011–12 | Nova KBM Branik | 3–2 | Calcit Volleyball |
| 2012–13 | Calcit Volleyball | 3–1 | Nova KBM Branik |
| 2013–14 | Calcit Volleyball | 3–1 | Nova KBM Branik |
| 2014–15 | Nova KBM Branik | 3–0 | Luka Koper |
| 2015–16 | Nova KBM Branik | 3–0 | Calcit Volleyball |
| 2016–17 | Nova KBM Branik | 3–2 | Calcit Volleyball |
| 2017–18 | Nova KBM Branik | 3–1 | Calcit Volley |
| 2018–19 | Calcit Volley | 3–1 | Nova KBM Branik |
| 2019–20 | Nova KBM Branik | 3–2 | Calcit Volley |
| 2020–21 | Not played (COVID-19 pandemic) | | |
| 2021–22 | Calcit Volley | 3–1 | Nova KBM Branik |
| 2022–23 | Nova KBM Branik | 3–2 | Calcit Volley |
| 2023–24 | Nova KBM Branik | 3–2 | Calcit Volley |
| 2024–25 | Calcit Volley | 3–0 | OTP Banka Branik |
| 2025–26 | OTP Banka Branik | 3–1 | GEN-I Volley |

== Titles by club ==
| Club | Titles | Seasons won |
|---|---|---|
| OTP Banka Branik | 21 | 1991–92, 1992–93, 1993–94, 1995–96, 1997–98, 1998–99, 1999–2000, 2000–01, 2001–02, 2002–03, 2009–10, 2010–11, 2011–12, 2014–15, 2015–16, 2016–17, 2017–18, 2019–20, 2022–23, 2023–24, 2025–26 |
| Calcit Volley | 5 | 2012–13, 2013–14, 2018–19, 2021–22, 2024–25 |
| Gorica | 4 | 2005–06, 2006–07, 2007–08, 2008–09 |
| Vital Ljubljana | 2 | 2003–04, 2004–05 |
| Celje | 1 | 1994–95 |
| Koper | 1 | 1996–97 |
