= Slovenian Volleyball League =

Superliga
- Sport: Volleyball
- Founded: 1991
- Administrator: Volleyball Federation of Slovenia
- No. of teams: 10
- Country: Slovenia
- Continent: Europe (CEV)
- Most recent champion: ACH Volley (22nd title) (2025–26)
- Most titles: ACH Volley (22 titles)
- Broadcaster: Sportklub
- Level on pyramid: 1
- Domestic cup: Slovenian Cup
- International cups: Champions League; CEV Cup; Challenge Cup
- Website: Official website

The Slovenian Volleyball Super League, also known as Sportklub Superliga due to sponsorship reasons, is the highest men's volleyball league in Slovenia. It is managed by the Volleyball Federation of Slovenia.

== Current teams ==
Teams in the 2026–27 season

Team	Location	Hall
ACH Volley	Ljubljana	Tivoli Hall
Alpacem Kanal	Kanal	Kanal Sports Hall
Calcit Volley	Kamnik	Kamnik Sports Hall
Črnuče	Ljubljana	Maks Pečar Hall
Fužinar Ravne	Ravne na Koroškem	OŠ Prežihovega Voranca
i-Vent Maribor	Maribor	Tabor Hall
Krka	Novo Mesto	Marof Sports Hall
Panvita Pomgrad	Murska Sobota	OŠ I Murska Sobota
Špan Brezovica	Brezovica pri Ljubljani	Balon Sports Hall
Triglav Kranj	Kranj	Planina Sports Hall

== Performance by club ==
Club	Titles	Winning years
ACH Volley	22	2000, 2005, 2006, 2007, 2008, 2009, 2010, 2011, 2012, 2013, 2014, 2015, 2016, 2017, 2018, 2019, 2020, 2022, 2023, 2024, 2025, 2026
Alpacem Kanal	5	1994, 1995, 1996, 1997, 1999
Maribor	3	1992, 1993, 2021
Calcit Volley	3	2001, 2002, 2003
Fužinar	1	1998
Šoštanj Topolšica	1	2004
