= ŽOK Partizan =

Serbian women's volleyball club

- Full name: Ženski odbojkaški klub Partizan Beograd
- Short name: ŽOK Partizan
- Nickname: Crno-bele (The Black & Whites); Parni valjak (The Steamroller)
- Founded: 1946, 2016
- Ground: Sportski Centar Master, Zemun (Belgrade), Serbia (Capacity: 1,350)
- Chairman: Predrag Golijanin
- Head coach: Ivan Steljić
- League: Super League
- Website: Club home page

Uniforms
Home	Away

Ženski odbojkaški klub Partizan (Serbian Cyrillic: Женски одбојкашки клуб Партизан, English: Women's volleyball club Partizan), commonly known as ŽOK Partizan, is the women's volleyball department of Serbian sports club JSD Partizan based in Belgrade. It was established in 1946 and dissolved in 1972, being re-established in 2016. The club won titles in the Yugoslav Volleyball Championship and is currently playing in the Serbian Super League.

== History ==
=== Yugoslav years ===
The women's volleyball department was established in 1946 and participated in the Yugoslav Volleyball Championship and Cup. Its most successful period was during the 1950s and 1960s, when it won the Yugoslav Championship on eight occasions and the Yugoslav Cup twice. The women's volleyball department was dissolved in 1972.

=== Serbian years ===
In 2013 an agreement with OK Vizura was made and Partizan's name was revived. Under the agreement, Partizan conceded its name, logo and colours to be used by Vizura's structure, creating a team called Partizan Vizura. In the 2013–14 season, the team won the Super Cup, finished second in the Serbian Cup and won the Serbian Super League. After that one season, the association ended.

During the summer of 2016, the management of the OK Partizan, led by the president of the club, Predrag Golijanin, and at the initiative of the famous volleyball player Željko Tanasković, decided to re-establish the women's team after a 44 years absence. Renewed ŽOK Partizan became administrated by OK Partizan under the organization of JSD Partizan. The women's department has teams in many categories (senior, junior, youth) competing in the 2016–17 season.

Since autumn 2016, OK Partizan founded a volleyball school for girls of all ages. The school is led by coaches that have extensive experience working with all selections. The club won its first season in the regional league, securing promotion to the national second league (Prva Liga), however the club was awarded promotion straight to the first league (Superliga) for the 2017–18 season.

The club plays its home matches at the Master Sports Center, with capacity for 1,350 spectators, located in Zemun (a suburb of Belgrade).

== Honours ==
=== National competitions ===
National Championship – 9

- Yugoslav Volleyball Championship :
  - Winners (8) : 1952, 1955, 1956, 1957, 1958, 1960, 1961, 1967–68
  - Runners-up (10): 1953, 1959, 1962, 1963, 1964, 1965, 1966, 1967, 1968–69, 1969–70
- Serbian Volleyball Championship :
  - Winners (1) : 2013–14

National Cup – 2

- Yugoslav Volleyball Cup :
  - Winners (2) : 1959, 1960
  - Runners-up (2): 1960–61, 1961
- Serbian Cup:
  - Runners-up (1): 2013–14

National Super Cup – 1

- Serbian Super Cup :

- Winners (1) : 2013

International

- CEV Women's Champions League:
  - Quarter-finalists (2): 1960–61, 1961–62
- BVA Cup:
  - Third place (1): 2022

== Team ==
Season 2017–2018, as of December 2017.

Number	Player	Position	Height (m)	Weight (kg)	Birth date
1	(Serbia) Danijela Stojanović	Setter	1.75		2 June 1989 (age 36)
2	(Serbia) Maja Trajković	Opposite	1.81		11 May 1994 (age 31)
4	(Serbia) Ana Jakšić	Middle blocker	1.81		16 January 1986 (age 39)
5	(Serbia) Olga Erceg	Setter	1.85		31 December 1986 (age 38)
6	(Serbia) Ana Drobnjak	Middle blocker	1.82		2 January 2002 (age 23)
7	(Serbia) Aleksandra Georgieva	Outside hitter	1.91		15 February 2002 (age 23)
8	(Serbia) Minja Tasić	Outside hitter	1.75		10 September 1996 (age 29)
9	(Serbia) Jovana Bičanin	Middle blocker	1.78		24 March 1995 (age 30)
10	(Serbia) Jelena Medarević	Setter	1.80		24 July 1992 (age 33)
11	(Serbia) Milena Spremo	Middle blocker	1.80		9 June 1994 (age 31)
12	(Serbia) Jovana Ćirković	Outside hitter	1.91		14 February 2003 (age 22)
13	(Serbia) Bojana Surla	Opposite	1.79	61	19 April 1999 (age 26)
14	(Serbia) Nadica Dragutinović	Libero	1.61		3 May 1995 (age 30)
15	(Serbia) Tara Taubner	Middle blocker	1.86		11 January 2002 (age 23)
16	(Serbia) Andrijana Šejat	Outside hitter	1.82		16 October 1996 (age 29)
17	(Serbia) Jelena Vujković	Libero	1.63	51	27 August 2000 (age 25)
18	(Serbia) Aleksandra Petrović	Middle blocker	1.70		7 December 1999 (age 26)
19	(Serbia) Ana-Marija Jonjev	Setter	1.80		1 January 2000 (age 25)

== Notable former players ==
- (Socialist Federal Republic of Yugoslavia) Gordana Tkačuk
- (Socialist Federal Republic of Yugoslavia) Branka Jaramazović
- (Socialist Federal Republic of Yugoslavia) Danica Glumac
- (Socialist Federal Republic of Yugoslavia) Štefanija Milošev
- (Socialist Federal Republic of Yugoslavia) Nataša Luković
- (Socialist Federal Republic of Yugoslavia) Desanka Končar
- (Socialist Federal Republic of Yugoslavia) Milica Stojadinović (1956–1971)
- (Socialist Federal Republic of Yugoslavia) Rajka Grozdanović
- (Socialist Federal Republic of Yugoslavia) Vida Nikolić - Popović
- (Socialist Federal Republic of Yugoslavia) Mirjana Nikolić
- (Socialist Federal Republic of Yugoslavia) Mirjana Despotović
- (Socialist Federal Republic of Yugoslavia) Ljubica Žakula
- (Socialist Federal Republic of Yugoslavia) Mirjana Rajačić
- (Socialist Federal Republic of Yugoslavia) Pavlina Tolić

== Former coaches ==
- (Socialist Federal Republic of Yugoslavia) Ljubomir Aćimović

== See also ==
- ŽOK Vizura
