= ŽOK Rijeka =

Croatian women's volleyball club

- Full name: Ženski odbojkaški klub Rijeka
- Short name: ŽOK Rijeka
- Founded: 1947
- Ground: Dvorana Mladosti (Capacity: 3,960)
- Chairman: Livio Tončinić
- Manager: Igor Lovrinov
- League: Croatian 1A Volleyball League
- 2012/13: 1st

ŽOK Rijeka is a Croatian women's volleyball club based in Rijeka. It was established in 1947. It plays in the Croatian 1A Volleyball League, and in recent years it has competed in the Women's CEV Champions League. They have won seven straight Croatian League titles since 2006, and the Middle European League in 2009.

== Honours ==
=== Domestic competitions ===
Croatian League

- Winners (10): 1998–99, 1999–2000, 2000–01, 2006–07, 2007–08, 2008–09, 2009–10, 2010–11, 2011–12, 2012–13
- Runners-up (5): 1992–93, 1993–94, 1995–96, 1996–97, 2005–06

Croatian Cup

- Winners (10): 1992, 1998, 1999, 2000, 2005, 2006, 2007, 2008, 2009, 2012
- Runners-up (7): 1993, 1994, 1995, 1996, 1997, 2010, 2011

Yugoslav League

- Winners (2): 1972–73, 1973–74
- Runners-up (2): 1974–75, 1975–76

Yugoslav Cup

- Winners (4): 1973, 1975, 1977, 1978

=== International competitions ===
Middle European Cup

- Winners (1): 2008–09
