= HAOK Mladost =

Croatian professional volleyball team based in Zagreb

Hrvatski akademski odbojkaški klub Mladost or simply HAOK Mladost is a Croatian professional volleyball team based in Zagreb which is part of the HAŠK Mladost sports society. It was established in 1945. HAOK is the most successful Croatian volleyball team in both the men's and women's selections, as the teams have won more than 60 national championships in Yugoslavia and Croatia.

== Honours (men's team) ==
- Yugoslav Volleyball Championship
  - Winners (17): 1948, 1952, 1962, 1963, 1965, 1966, 1968, 1969, 1970, 1971, 1977, 1981, 1982, 1983, 1984, 1985, 1986
- Croatian Volleyball League
  - Winners (23): 1992–93, 1993–94, 1994–95, 1995–96, 1996–97, 1997–98, 1998–99, 1999–2000, 2000–01, 2001–02, 2002–03, 2005–06, 2006–07, 2007–08, 2009–10, 2010–11, 2017–18, 2018–19, 2020–21, 2021–22, 2022–23, 2023–24, 2025–26
  - Runners-up (11): 2003–04, 2004–05, 2008–09, 2011–12, 2012–13, 2013–14, 2014–15, 2015–16, 2016–17, 2019–20, 2024–25
- Yugoslav Volleyball Cup
  - Winners (8): 1978, 1980, 1981, 1983, 1984, 1985, 1986, 1988
- Croatian Volleyball Cup
  - Winners (24): 1993, 1994, 1995, 1996, 1997, 1998, 2000, 2001, 2002, 2003, 2004, 2005, 2006, 2008, 2009, 2013, 2014, 2015, 2016, 2019, 2020, 2022, 2024, 2026
  - Runners-up (3): 2010, 2023, 2025
- Croatian Volleyball Super Cup
  - Winners (2): 2016, 2017
- CEV Champions League
  - Runners-up (3): 1964, 1984, 1985
- CEV Challenge Cup
  - Runners-up (1): 2010
- Interleague
  - Winners (4): 1995–96, 1996–97, 1997–98, 1998–99
  - Runners-up (1): 1993–94
- MEVZA League
  - Runners-up (3): 2019–20, 2021–22, 2024–25

== Honours (women's team) ==
- Yugoslav Volleyball Championship
  - Winners (5): 1984, 1987, 1989, 1990, 1991
- Croatian Volleyball League
  - Winners (19): 1992–93, 1993–94, 1994–95, 1995–96, 2001–02, 2002–03, 2003–04, 2004–05, 2005–06, 2013–14, 2015–16, 2017–18, 2018–19, 2019–20, 2020–21, 2021–22, 2022–23, 2023–24, 2025–26
  - Runners-up (3): 2014–15, 2016–17, 2024–25
- Yugoslav Volleyball Cup
  - Winners (7): 1981, 1984, 1985, 1986, 1988, 1989, 1990
- Croatian Volleyball Cup
  - Winners (14): 1993, 1994, 1995, 2002, 2004, 2014, 2015, 2018, 2019, 2020, 2021, 2023, 2024, 2026
  - Runners-up (4): 2001, 2006, 2009, 2025
- Croatian Volleyball Super Cup
  - Runners-up (1): 2016
- Women's CEV Champions League
  - Winners (1): 1991
  - Runners-up (2): 1992, 1994
- Interleague
  - Winners (1): 1993–94
- MEVZA League
  - Winners (2): 2024–25, 2025–26
  - Runners-up (1): 2023–24
