= Croatian 1A Volleyball League =

Volleyball competition in Croatia

- Sport: Volleyball
- First season: 1992
- Country: Croatia

The Croatian 1-A Volleyball League is the highest level of volleyball competition in Croatia. It is organized by the Croatian Volleyball Federation. It was founded in 1992.

== Croatian Volleyball League and Cup winners - Men ==
Season	League	Cup
2023–24	HAOK Mladost	HAOK Mladost
2022–23	HAOK Mladost	MOK Mursa Osijek
2021–22	HAOK Mladost	HAOK Mladost
2020–21	HAOK Mladost	MOK Mursa Osijek
2019–20	OK Mladost Kaštela	HAOK Mladost
2018–19	HAOK Mladost	HAOK Mladost
2017–18	HAOK Mladost	OK Mladost Kaštela
2016–17	OK Mladost Kaštela	HAOK Mladost
2015–16	OK Mladost Kaštela	HAOK Mladost
2014–15	OK Mladost Kaštela	HAOK Mladost
2013–14	OK Mladost Kaštela	HAOK Mladost
2012–13	OK Mladost Kaštela	OK Rovinj
2011–12	OK Mladost Kaštela	MOK Mursa Osijek
2010–11	HAOK Mladost	OK Mladost Kaštela
2009–10	HAOK Mladost	HAOK Mladost
2008–09	MOK Zagreb	HAOK Mladost
2007–08	HAOK Mladost	HAOK Mladost
2006–07	HAOK Mladost	Varaždin
2005–06	HAOK Mladost	HAOK Mladost
2004–05	Varaždin	HAOK Mladost
2003–04	Varaždin	HAOK Mladost
2002–03	HAOK Mladost	HAOK Mladost
2001–02	HAOK Mladost	HAOK Mladost
2000–01	HAOK Mladost	OK Mladost KL
1999–2000	HAOK Mladost	HAOK Mladost
1998–99	HAOK Mladost	HAOK Mladost
1997–98	HAOK Mladost	HAOK Mladost
1996–97	HAOK Mladost	HAOK Mladost
1995–96	HAOK Mladost	HAOK Mladost
1994–95	HAOK Mladost	HAOK Mladost
1993–94	HAOK Mladost	HAOK Mladost
1992–93	HAOK Mladost	HAOK Mladost

== Croatian Volleyball League and Cup winners - Women ==
Season	League	Cup
2017–18	HAOK Mladost	HAOK Mladost
2016–17	OK Marina Kaštela	OK Marina Kaštela
2015–16	HAOK Mladost	HAOK Mladost
2014–15	OK Poreč	HAOK Mladost
2013–14	HAOK Mladost	OK Poreč
2012–13	HAOK Rijeka CO	HAOK Rijeka CO
2011–12	ŽOK Rijeka	ŽOK Vukovar
2010–11	ŽOK Rijeka	ŽOK Vukovar
2009–10	ŽOK Rijeka	ŽOK Vukovar
2008–09	ŽOK Rijeka	ŽOK Rijeka
2007–08	ŽOK Rijeka	ŽOK Rijeka
2006–07	ŽOK Rijeka	ŽOK Rijeka
2005–06	HAOK Mladost	ŽOK Rijeka
2004–05	HAOK Mladost	ŽOK Rijeka
2003–04	HAOK Mladost	HAOK Mladost
2002–03	HAOK Mladost	OK Azena Tifon
2001–02	HAOK Mladost	HAOK Mladost
2000–01	ŽOK Rijeka	OK Kaštela DC
1999–00	ŽOK Rijeka	ŽOK Rijeka
1998–99	ŽOK Rijeka	ŽOK Rijeka
1997–98	OK Dubrovnik	ŽOK Rijeka
1996–97	OK Dubrovnik	OK Dubrovnik
1995–96	HAOK Mladost	OK Dubrovnik
1994–95	HAOK Mladost	HAOK Mladost
1993–94	HAOK Mladost	HAOK Mladost
1992–93	HAOK Mladost	HAOK Mladost
