= 2015–16 CEV Women's Champions League squads =

This article shows the rosters of all participating teams at the 2015–16 CEV Women's Champions League in several countries.

== Pool A ==
=== Allianz MTV Stuttgart ===
The following is the roster of the German club Allianz MTV Stuttgart in the 2015–16 CEV Women's Champions League.

Head coach: (Spain) Guillermo Naranjo

No.	Name	Date of birth	Height	Weight	Spike	Block	Position
1	(Germany) Jelena Wlk	16 April 1993 (age 32)	1.78 m (5 ft 10 in)	70 kg (150 lb)	298 cm (117 in)	285 cm (112 in)	Outside-spiker
2	(Netherlands) Femke Stoltenborg	30 July 1991 (age 34)	1.89 m (6 ft 2 in)	73 kg (161 lb)	300 cm (120 in)	285 cm (112 in)	Setter
3	(Brazil) Micheli Tomazela	28 March 1984 (age 41)	1.85 m (6 ft 1 in)	73 kg (161 lb)	296 cm (117 in)	279 cm (110 in)	Middle-blocker
4	(United States) Valerie Nichol	29 April 1993 (age 32)	1.84 m (6 ft 0 in)	71 kg (157 lb)	303 cm (119 in)	289 cm (114 in)	Setter
5	(Netherlands) Kim Renkema	28 June 1987 (age 38)	1.79 m (5 ft 10 in)	66 kg (146 lb)	288 cm (113 in)	279 cm (110 in)	Outside-spiker
6	(Germany) Viktoria Seeber	14 April 1997 (age 28)	1.86 m (6 ft 1 in)	73 kg (161 lb)	286 cm (113 in)	275 cm (108 in)	Opposite
7	(Hungary) Renáta Sándor	15 December 1990 (age 34)	1.82 m (6 ft 0 in)	70 kg (150 lb)	298 cm (117 in)	285 cm (112 in)	Outside-spiker
8	(Belgium) Kaja Grobelna	4 January 1995 (age 30)	1.88 m (6 ft 2 in)	68 kg (150 lb)	315 cm (124 in)	299 cm (118 in)	Opposite
9	(Canada) Caroline Jarmoc	16 September 1991 (age 34)	1.86 m (6 ft 1 in)	66 kg (146 lb)	289 cm (114 in)	289 cm (114 in)	Middle-blocker
10	(United States) Stevi Robinson	15 October 1989 (age 36)	1.68 m (5 ft 6 in)	74 kg (163 lb)	210 cm (83 in)	205 cm (81 in)	Libero
11	(Germany) Lisa Thomsen	20 August 1985 (age 40)	1.72 m (5 ft 8 in)	66 kg (146 lb)	285 cm (112 in)	277 cm (109 in)	Libero
12	(Netherlands) Deborah Van Daelen	24 March 1989 (age 36)	1.74 m (5 ft 9 in)	65 kg (143 lb)	286 cm (113 in)	272 cm (107 in)	Opposite
14	(Germany) Julika Hoffmann	25 May 1998 (age 27)	1.78 m (5 ft 10 in)	72 kg (159 lb)	290 cm (110 in)	270 cm (110 in)	Setter
15	(United States) Nichole Lindow	6 August 1992 (age 33)	1.88 m (6 ft 2 in)	79 kg (174 lb)	307 cm (121 in)	286 cm (113 in)	Middle-blocker
16	(Czech Republic) Michaela Mlejnková	26 July 1996 (age 29)	1.84 m (6 ft 0 in)	80 kg (180 lb)	299 cm (118 in)	278 cm (109 in)	Outside-spiker
17	(Germany) Julia Wenzel	12 January 1998 (age 27)	1.80 m (5 ft 11 in)	67 kg (148 lb)	290 cm (110 in)	285 cm (112 in)	Outside-spiker

=== Azerrail Baku ===
The following is the roster of the Azerí club Azerrail Baku in the 2015–16 CEV Women's Champions League.

Head coach: (Azerbaijan) Bülent Karslioglu

No.	Name	Date of birth	Height	Weight	Spike	Block	Position
1	(Thailand) Wanna Buakaew	2 January 1981 (age 44)	1.77 m (5 ft 10 in)	71 kg (157 lb)	295 cm (116 in)	278 cm (109 in)	Libero
2	(Azerbaijan) Kseniya Poznyak	21 November 1986 (age 38)	1.90 m (6 ft 3 in)	86 kg (190 lb)	310 cm (120 in)	286 cm (113 in)	Middle-blocker
3	(Azerbaijan) Nikalina Bashnakova	29 March 1998 (age 27)	1.87 m (6 ft 2 in)	64 kg (141 lb)	298 cm (117 in)	285 cm (112 in)	Outside-spiker
4	(Azerbaijan) Nisakhanim Hazratli	18 November 1997 (age 27)	1.78 m (5 ft 10 in)	64 kg (141 lb)	287 cm (113 in)	280 cm (110 in)	Outside-spiker
5	(Azerbaijan) Odina Bayramova	25 May 1990 (age 35)	1.86 m (6 ft 1 in)	71 kg (157 lb)	298 cm (117 in)	280 cm (110 in)	Outside-spiker
6	(Azerbaijan) Anastasiia Muzyka	15 October 1997 (age 28)	1.85 m (6 ft 1 in)	68 kg (150 lb)	300 cm (120 in)	280 cm (110 in)	Setter
7	(Puerto Rico) Stephanie Enright	15 December 1990 (age 34)	1.82 m (6 ft 0 in)	72 kg (159 lb)	310 cm (120 in)	294 cm (116 in)	Outside-spiker
9	(United States) Madison Kingdon	20 April 1993 (age 32)	1.85 m (6 ft 1 in)	73 kg (161 lb)	305 cm (120 in)	289 cm (114 in)	Outside-spiker
10	(United States) Haley Eckerman	10 November 1992 (age 32)	1.89 m (6 ft 2 in)	75 kg (165 lb)	305 cm (120 in)	290 cm (110 in)	Outside-spiker
11	(United States) Jessica Tow-Arnett	15 November 1986 (age 38)	1.86 m (6 ft 1 in)	68 kg (150 lb)	308 cm (121 in)	288 cm (113 in)	Middle-blocker
12	(Azerbaijan) Valeriya Mammadova	29 January 1984 (age 41)	1.74 m (5 ft 9 in)	65 kg (143 lb)	286 cm (113 in)	272 cm (107 in)	Libero
14	(Puerto Rico) Natalia Valentin	12 September 1989 (age 36)	1.72 m (5 ft 8 in)	65 kg (143 lb)	298 cm (117 in)	270 cm (110 in)	Setter
17	(Bulgaria) Strashimira Filipova	18 August 1985 (age 40)	1.92 m (6 ft 4 in)	80 kg (180 lb)	310 cm (120 in)	290 cm (110 in)	Middle-blocker
18	(Thailand) Nootsara Tomkom	7 July 1985 (age 40)	1.72 m (5 ft 8 in)	62 kg (137 lb)	250 cm (98 in)	230 cm (91 in)	Setter
19	(Senegal) Fatou Diouck	19 June 1985 (age 40)	1.83 m (6 ft 0 in)	70 kg (150 lb)	303 cm (119 in)	285 cm (112 in)	Outside-spiker

=== Dinamo Kazan ===
The following is the roster of the Russian club Dinamo Kazan in the 2015–16 CEV Women's Champions League.

Head coach: (Russia) Rishat Gilyazutdinov

No.	Name	Date of birth	Height	Weight	Spike	Block	Position
1	(Russia) Maria Borodakova	8 March 1986 (age 39)	1.90 m (6 ft 3 in)	88 kg (194 lb)	300 cm (120 in)	297 cm (117 in)	Middle-blocker
3	(Russia) Elena Ezhova	14 August 1977 (age 48)	1.78 m (5 ft 10 in)	66 kg (146 lb)	265 cm (104 in)	260 cm (100 in)	Libero
4	(Russia) Daria Malygina	4 April 1994 (age 31)	2.02 m (6 ft 8 in)	80 kg (180 lb)	300 cm (120 in)	297 cm (117 in)	Opposite
5	(Russia) Irina Malkova	5 January 1989 (age 36)	1.92 m (6 ft 4 in)	80 kg (180 lb)	300 cm (120 in)	294 cm (116 in)	Middle-blocker
6	(Russia) Olga Biryukova	19 September 1994 (age 31)	1.90 m (6 ft 3 in)	65 kg (143 lb)	300 cm (120 in)	295 cm (116 in)	Outside-spiker
7	(Russia) Victoria Chaplina	23 October 1988 (age 37)	1.90 m (6 ft 3 in)	76 kg (168 lb)	309 cm (122 in)	300 cm (120 in)	Outside-spiker
8	(Russia) Anna Matienko	12 July 1981 (age 44)	1.82 m (6 ft 0 in)	68 kg (150 lb)	298 cm (117 in)	292 cm (115 in)	Setter
9	(Russia) Victoria Kuzyakina	1 June 1985 (age 40)	1.75 m (5 ft 9 in)	63 kg (139 lb)	270 cm (110 in)	260 cm (100 in)	Libero
10	(Russia) Elena Yureva	21 September 1984 (age 41)	1.91 m (6 ft 3 in)	78 kg (172 lb)	310 cm (120 in)	300 cm (120 in)	Middle-blocker
11	(Russia) Ekaterina Gamova	17 October 1980 (age 45)	2.04 m (6 ft 8 in)	80 kg (180 lb)	320 cm (130 in)	310 cm (120 in)	Opposite
13	(Russia) Evgeniya Startseva	12 February 1989 (age 36)	1.85 m (6 ft 1 in)	65 kg (143 lb)	295 cm (116 in)	290 cm (110 in)	Setter
15	(Italy) Antonella Del Core	5 November 1980 (age 44)	1.82 m (6 ft 0 in)	70 kg (150 lb)	305 cm (120 in)	300 cm (120 in)	Outside-spiker
16	(Russia) Anna Melnikova	13 October 1995 (age 30)	1.92 m (6 ft 4 in)	87 kg (192 lb)	305 cm (120 in)	295 cm (116 in)	Middle-blocker
17	(Russia) Olesya Nikolaeva	18 March 1994 (age 31)	1.84 m (6 ft 0 in)	60 kg (130 lb)	300 cm (120 in)	293 cm (115 in)	Outside-spiker
18	(Bulgaria) Elitsa Vasileva	13 May 1990 (age 35)	1.92 m (6 ft 4 in)	73 kg (161 lb)	303 cm (119 in)	295 cm (116 in)	Outside-spiker
19	(Russia) Daria Isaeva	29 March 1990 (age 35)	1.86 m (6 ft 1 in)	70 kg (150 lb)	300 cm (120 in)	295 cm (116 in)	Outside-spiker

=== Lokomotiv Baku ===
The following is the roster of the Azerí club Lokomotiv Baku in the 2015–16 CEV Women's Champions League.

Head coach: (Italy) François Salvagni

No.	Name	Date of birth	Height	Weight	Spike	Block	Position
1	(Croatia) Hana Čutura	10 March 1988 (age 37)	1.86 m (6 ft 1 in)	82 kg (181 lb)	326 cm (128 in)	325 cm (128 in)	Outside-spiker
2	(Azerbaijan) Yana Azimova	5 July 1994 (age 31)	1.79 m (5 ft 10 in)	70 kg (150 lb)	283 cm (111 in)	284 cm (112 in)	Setter
3	(United States) Kanani Danielson	2 January 1990 (age 35)	1.76 m (5 ft 9 in)	70 kg (150 lb)	302 cm (119 in)	303 cm (119 in)	Outside-spiker
4	(Czech Republic) Aneta Havlíčková	3 July 1987 (age 38)	1.87 m (6 ft 2 in)	85 kg (187 lb)	326 cm (128 in)	328 cm (129 in)	Outside-spiker
5	(Turkey) Özge Çemberci	26 June 1985 (age 40)	1.83 m (6 ft 0 in)	78 kg (172 lb)	321 cm (126 in)	322 cm (127 in)	Setter
6	(Azerbaijan) Ayshan Abdulazimova	11 April 1993 (age 32)	1.85 m (6 ft 1 in)	80 kg (180 lb)	321 cm (126 in)	326 cm (128 in)	Middle-blocker
7	(Azerbaijan) Valerya Zagorskaya	29 December 1998 (age 26)	1.70 m (5 ft 7 in)	70 kg (150 lb)	279 cm (110 in)	280 cm (110 in)	Outside-spiker
8	(Azerbaijan) Ülkər Kərimova	22 June 1994 (age 31)	1.83 m (6 ft 0 in)	78 kg (172 lb)	311 cm (122 in)	316 cm (124 in)	Outside-spiker
9	(Serbia) Aleksandra Crnčević	30 May 1987 (age 38)	1.85 m (6 ft 1 in)	80 kg (180 lb)	321 cm (126 in)	322 cm (127 in)	Outside-spiker
10	(United States) Sonja Newcombe	7 March 1988 (age 37)	1.88 m (6 ft 2 in)	76 kg (168 lb)	309 cm (122 in)	309 cm (122 in)	Outside-spiker
12	(Slovakia) Jaroslava Pencová	24 June 1990 (age 35)	1.87 m (6 ft 2 in)	86 kg (190 lb)	323 cm (127 in)	326 cm (128 in)	Middle-blocker
15	(Dominican Republic) Brenda Castillo	5 June 1992 (age 33)	1.65 m (5 ft 5 in)	60 kg (130 lb)	218 cm (86 in)	219 cm (86 in)	Libero
16	(Azerbaijan) Oksana Kiselyova	30 May 1992 (age 33)	1.78 m (5 ft 10 in)	78 kg (172 lb)	310 cm (120 in)	315 cm (124 in)	Libero
18	(Germany) Berit Kauffeldt	8 July 1990 (age 35)	1.86 m (6 ft 1 in)	80 kg (180 lb)	322 cm (127 in)	323 cm (127 in)	Middle-blocker

== Pool B ==
=== Calcit Ljubljana ===
The following is the roster of the Slovenian club Calcit Ljubljana in the 2015–16 CEV Women's Champions League.

Head coach: (Slovenia) Gašper Ribič

No.	Name	Date of birth	Height	Weight	Spike	Block	Position
2	(Slovenia) Tina Grudina	3 December 1995 (age 29)	1.79 m (5 ft 10 in)	70 kg (150 lb)	305 cm (120 in)	302 cm (119 in)	Middle-blocker
3	(Slovenia) Mojca Božič	30 March 1992 (age 33)	1.74 m (5 ft 9 in)	68 kg (150 lb)	285 cm (112 in)	280 cm (110 in)	Setter
6	(Slovenia) Petra Vrhovnik	2 August 1992 (age 33)	1.80 m (5 ft 11 in)	70 kg (150 lb)	295 cm (116 in)	293 cm (115 in)	Outside-spiker
7	(Slovenia) Urska Iglicar	17 March 1995 (age 30)	1.87 m (6 ft 2 in)	73 kg (161 lb)	307 cm (121 in)	299 cm (118 in)	Opposite
8	(Slovenia) Maja Forštnaric	17 July 1996 (age 29)	1.88 m (6 ft 2 in)	78 kg (172 lb)	310 cm (120 in)	305 cm (120 in)	Middle-blocker
9	(Slovenia) Elena Kucej	3 December 1994 (age 30)	1.86 m (6 ft 1 in)	74 kg (163 lb)	305 cm (120 in)	301 cm (119 in)	Middle-blocker
10	(Serbia) Olivera Kostić	9 December 1991 (age 33)	1.84 m (6 ft 0 in)	74 kg (163 lb)	306 cm (120 in)	301 cm (119 in)	Opposite
11	(Brazil) Cecilia Veloso	16 September 1991 (age 34)	1.78 m (5 ft 10 in)	70 kg (150 lb)	290 cm (110 in)	282 cm (111 in)	Setter
12	(Slovenia) Ana-Katarina Hribar	27 July 1992 (age 33)	1.70 m (5 ft 7 in)	68 kg (150 lb)	290 cm (110 in)	285 cm (112 in)	Libero
13	(Slovenia) Meta Jerala	26 September 1991 (age 34)	1.70 m (5 ft 7 in)	63 kg (139 lb)	283 cm (111 in)	278 cm (109 in)	Libero
14	(Slovenia) Kaja Turk	21 October 1994 (age 31)	1.86 m (6 ft 1 in)	64 kg (141 lb)	305 cm (120 in)	300 cm (120 in)	Outside-spiker
16	(Slovenia) Monika Potokar	18 December 1987 (age 37)	1.78 m (5 ft 10 in)	70 kg (150 lb)	295 cm (116 in)	280 cm (110 in)	Outside-spiker

=== Igor Gorgonzola Novara ===
The following is the roster of the Italian club Igor Gorgonzola Novara in the 2015–16 CEV Women's Champions League.

Head coach: (Italy) Luciano Pedulla

No.	Name	Date of birth	Height	Weight	Spike	Block	Position
1	(Belgium) Hélène Rousseaux	25 September 1991 (age 34)	1.88 m (6 ft 2 in)	72 kg (159 lb)	322 cm (127 in)	300 cm (120 in)	Outside-spiker
2	(Italy) Chiara Bosetti	24 November 1998 (age 26)	1.74 m (5 ft 9 in)	53 kg (117 lb)	287 cm (113 in)	270 cm (110 in)	Outside-spiker
3	(Italy) Eleonora Bruno	15 April 1994 (age 31)	1.80 m (5 ft 11 in)	60 kg (130 lb)	295 cm (116 in)	258 cm (102 in)	Libero
5	(Poland) Magdalena Wawrzyniak	14 March 1990 (age 35)	1.85 m (6 ft 1 in)	72 kg (159 lb)	320 cm (130 in)	305 cm (120 in)	Opposite
6	(Serbia) Tijana Malešević	18 March 1991 (age 34)	1.85 m (6 ft 1 in)	78 kg (172 lb)	300 cm (120 in)	286 cm (113 in)	Outside-spiker
7	(Italy) Martina Guiggi	1 May 1984 (age 41)	1.88 m (6 ft 2 in)	69 kg (152 lb)	315 cm (124 in)	290 cm (110 in)	Middle-blocker
8	(Puerto Rico) Aurea Cruz	10 January 1982 (age 43)	1.83 m (6 ft 0 in)	63 kg (139 lb)	310 cm (120 in)	290 cm (110 in)	Outside-spiker
9	(Italy) Sara Bonifacio	3 July 1996 (age 29)	1.85 m (6 ft 1 in)	76 kg (168 lb)	320 cm (130 in)	300 cm (120 in)	Middle-blocker
10	(Italy) Cristina Chirichella	10 February 1994 (age 31)	1.95 m (6 ft 5 in)	73 kg (161 lb)	314 cm (124 in)	296 cm (117 in)	Middle-blocker
11	(Italy) Stefania Sansonna	1 November 1982 (age 42)	1.75 m (5 ft 9 in)	68 kg (150 lb)	298 cm (117 in)	276 cm (109 in)	Libero
13	(Italy) Noemi Signorile	15 February 1990 (age 35)	1.83 m (6 ft 0 in)	70 kg (150 lb)	294 cm (116 in)	290 cm (110 in)	Setter
14	(Italy) Caterina Bosetti	2 February 1994 (age 31)	1.80 m (5 ft 11 in)	59 kg (130 lb)	299 cm (118 in)	281 cm (111 in)	Outside-spiker
15	(Italy) Noura Mabilo	22 August 1996 (age 29)	1.84 m (6 ft 0 in)	59 kg (130 lb)	299 cm (118 in)	281 cm (111 in)	Middle-blocker
17	(Italy) Francesca Bosio	7 August 1997 (age 28)	1.80 m (5 ft 11 in)	69 kg (152 lb)	294 cm (116 in)	284 cm (112 in)	Setter
18	(Croatia) Samanta Fabris	8 February 1992 (age 33)	1.89 m (6 ft 2 in)	79 kg (174 lb)	322 cm (127 in)	306 cm (120 in)	Opposite

=== PGE Atom Trefl Sopot ===
The following is the roster of the Polish club PGE Atom Trefl Sopot in the 2015–16 CEV Women's Champions League.

Head coach: (Italy) Lorenzo Micelli

No.	Name	Date of birth	Height	Weight	Spike	Block	Position
1	(Poland) Maja Tokarska	22 February 1991 (age 34)	1.93 m (6 ft 4 in)	72 kg (159 lb)	325 cm (128 in)	305 cm (120 in)	Middle-blocker
2	(Netherlands) Maret Grothues	16 September 1988 (age 37)	1.80 m (5 ft 11 in)	68 kg (150 lb)	304 cm (120 in)	290 cm (110 in)	Outside-spiker
3	(Serbia) Ivana Đerisilo	8 August 1983 (age 42)	1.85 m (6 ft 1 in)	72 kg (159 lb)	315 cm (124 in)	300 cm (120 in)	Opposite
5	(Ukraine) Olga Savenchuk	20 May 1988 (age 37)	1.88 m (6 ft 2 in)	78 kg (172 lb)	315 cm (124 in)	305 cm (120 in)	Outside-spiker
6	(Poland) Anna Miros	30 October 1985 (age 39)	1.96 m (6 ft 5 in)	80 kg (180 lb)	325 cm (128 in)	306 cm (120 in)	Opposite
7	(Poland) Magdalena Damaske	19 February 1996 (age 29)	1.85 m (6 ft 1 in)	69 kg (152 lb)	317 cm (125 in)	305 cm (120 in)	Outside-spiker
8	(Poland) Zuzanna Efimienko	8 August 1989 (age 36)	1.96 m (6 ft 5 in)	78 kg (172 lb)	325 cm (128 in)	315 cm (124 in)	Middle-blocker
9	(Serbia) Danica Radenkovic	9 October 1992 (age 33)	1.85 m (6 ft 1 in)	70 kg (150 lb)	300 cm (120 in)	294 cm (116 in)	Setter
10	(Poland) Anna Kaczmar	26 September 1985 (age 40)	1.81 m (5 ft 11 in)	67 kg (148 lb)	300 cm (120 in)	287 cm (113 in)	Setter
11	(Poland) Justyna Łukasik	27 January 1993 (age 32)	1.88 m (6 ft 2 in)	72 kg (159 lb)	244 cm (96 in)	308 cm (121 in)	Middle-blocker
13	(Poland) Agata Durajczyk	19 August 1989 (age 36)	1.70 m (5 ft 7 in)	62 kg (137 lb)	288 cm (113 in)	270 cm (110 in)	Libero
14	(Poland) Klaudia Kulig	1 May 1997 (age 28)	1.73 m (5 ft 8 in)	60 kg (130 lb)	285 cm (112 in)	275 cm (108 in)	Libero
15	(United States) Brittnee Cooper	26 February 1988 (age 37)	1.88 m (6 ft 2 in)	80 kg (180 lb)	345 cm (136 in)	318 cm (125 in)	Middle-blocker
16	(Poland) Klaudia Kaczorowska	20 December 1988 (age 36)	1.83 m (6 ft 0 in)	66 kg (146 lb)	317 cm (125 in)	308 cm (121 in)	Outside-spiker
18	(Poland) Katarzyna Zaroślińska	3 February 1987 (age 38)	1.87 m (6 ft 2 in)	80 kg (180 lb)	322 cm (127 in)	310 cm (120 in)	Opposite

=== Vakıfbank İstanbul ===
The following is the roster of the Turkish club Vakıfbank İstanbul in the 2015–16 CEV Women's Champions League.

Head coach: (Italy) Giovanni Guidetti

No.	Name	Date of birth	Height	Weight	Spike	Block	Position
1	(Turkey) Gizem Örge	26 April 1993 (age 32)	1.70 m (5 ft 7 in)	60 kg (130 lb)	280 cm (110 in)	270 cm (110 in)	Libero
2	(Turkey) Gözde Kırdar	25 November 1985 (age 39)	1.83 m (6 ft 0 in)	70 kg (150 lb)	297 cm (117 in)	292 cm (115 in)	Outside-spiker
5	(Netherlands) Robin de Kruijf	5 May 1991 (age 34)	1.93 m (6 ft 4 in)	81 kg (179 lb)	314 cm (124 in)	299 cm (118 in)	Middle-blocker
6	(Turkey) Kübra Akman	13 October 1994 (age 31)	1.97 m (6 ft 6 in)	88 kg (194 lb)	320 cm (130 in)	315 cm (124 in)	Middle-blocker
7	(Turkey) Çağla Akın	19 January 1995 (age 30)	1.78 m (5 ft 10 in)	70 kg (150 lb)	285 cm (112 in)	275 cm (108 in)	Setter
8	(Turkey) Melis Gürkaynak	20 April 1990 (age 35)	1.85 m (6 ft 1 in)	72 kg (159 lb)	295 cm (116 in)	285 cm (112 in)	Middle-blocker
9	(Turkey) Seda Aslanyürek	25 June 1986 (age 39)	1.92 m (6 ft 4 in)	80 kg (180 lb)	312 cm (123 in)	304 cm (120 in)	Opposite
10	(Netherlands) Lonneke Slöetjes	15 November 1990 (age 34)	1.92 m (6 ft 4 in)	72 kg (159 lb)	322 cm (127 in)	315 cm (124 in)	Opposite
11	(Turkey) Naz Aydemir	14 August 1990 (age 35)	1.86 m (6 ft 1 in)	70 kg (150 lb)	304 cm (120 in)	300 cm (120 in)	Setter
12	(Netherlands) Anne Buijs	2 December 1991 (age 33)	1.91 m (6 ft 3 in)	74 kg (163 lb)	314 cm (124 in)	300 cm (120 in)	Outside-spiker
13	(Brazil) Sheilla Castro	1 July 1983 (age 42)	1.85 m (6 ft 1 in)	64 kg (141 lb)	302 cm (119 in)	284 cm (112 in)	Opposite
15	(United States) Kimberly Hill	30 November 1989 (age 35)	1.94 m (6 ft 4 in)	72 kg (159 lb)	320 cm (130 in)	310 cm (120 in)	Outside-spiker
16	(Serbia) Milena Rašić	25 October 1990 (age 35)	1.93 m (6 ft 4 in)	75 kg (165 lb)	303 cm (119 in)	293 cm (115 in)	Middle-blocker
17	(Turkey) Cansu Çetin	26 May 1993 (age 32)	1.83 m (6 ft 0 in)	69 kg (152 lb)	295 cm (116 in)	285 cm (112 in)	Outside-spiker
18	(Turkey) Ayça Aykaç	27 February 1996 (age 29)	1.75 m (5 ft 9 in)	63 kg (139 lb)	270 cm (110 in)	260 cm (100 in)	Libero

== Pool C ==
=== Agel Prostějov ===
The following is the roster of the Czech club Agel Prostějov in the 2015–16 CEV Women's Champions League.

Head coach: (Slovakia) Miroslav Čada

No.	Name	Date of birth	Height	Weight	Spike	Block	Position
1	(Croatia) Mira Topić	2 June 1983 (age 42)	1.86 m (6 ft 1 in)	72 kg (159 lb)	310 cm (120 in)	300 cm (120 in)	Outside-spiker
2	(Czech Republic) Barbora Gambová	7 March 1992 (age 33)	1.78 m (5 ft 10 in)	68 kg (150 lb)	300 cm (120 in)	300 cm (120 in)	Outside-spiker
4	(Cuba) Melissa Vargas	16 October 1999 (age 26)	1.91 m (6 ft 3 in)	78 kg (172 lb)	320 cm (130 in)	310 cm (120 in)	Outside-spiker
5	(Germany) Kathleen Weiß	2 February 1984 (age 41)	1.77 m (5 ft 10 in)	62 kg (137 lb)	300 cm (120 in)	295 cm (116 in)	Setter
6	(Slovakia) Nina Herelová	30 July 1993 (age 32)	1.85 m (6 ft 1 in)	68 kg (150 lb)	310 cm (120 in)	307 cm (121 in)	Middle-blocker
7	(Netherlands) Quinta Steenbergen	2 April 1985 (age 40)	1.87 m (6 ft 2 in)	70 kg (150 lb)	315 cm (124 in)	310 cm (120 in)	Middle-blocker
9	(Slovenia) Sonja Borovinšek	4 July 1980 (age 45)	1.87 m (6 ft 2 in)	72 kg (159 lb)	305 cm (120 in)	300 cm (120 in)	Middle-blocker
10	(Slovakia) Solange Soares	1 July 1980 (age 45)	1.81 m (5 ft 11 in)	62 kg (137 lb)	305 cm (120 in)	300 cm (120 in)	Opposite
11	(Cuba) Leanny Castañeda	18 October 1986 (age 39)	1.86 m (6 ft 1 in)	74 kg (163 lb)	313 cm (123 in)	308 cm (121 in)	Opposite
12	(Czech Republic) Julie Kovarová	14 September 1987 (age 38)	1.79 m (5 ft 10 in)	61 kg (134 lb)	300 cm (120 in)	290 cm (110 in)	Libero
14	(Czech Republic) Kristyna Adamciková	2 July 1997 (age 28)	1.83 m (6 ft 0 in)	67 kg (148 lb)	305 cm (120 in)	300 cm (120 in)	Outside-spiker
15	(Belarus) Tatsiana Markevich	25 March 1988 (age 37)	1.84 m (6 ft 0 in)	60 kg (130 lb)	305 cm (120 in)	300 cm (120 in)	Outside-spiker
16	(Czech Republic) Veronika Tinklová	14 October 1986 (age 39)	1.81 m (5 ft 11 in)	62 kg (137 lb)	300 cm (120 in)	290 cm (110 in)	Setter
18	(Cuba) Sulian Matienzo	14 December 1994 (age 30)	1.78 m (5 ft 10 in)	72 kg (159 lb)	305 cm (120 in)	300 cm (120 in)	Outside-spiker

=== Chemik Police ===
The following is the roster of the Polish club Chemik Police in the 2015–16 CEV Women's Champions League.

Head coach: (Italy) Giuseppe Cuccarini

No.	Name	Date of birth	Height	Weight	Spike	Block	Position
1	(Poland) Anna Werblińska	14 May 1984 (age 41)	1.78 m (5 ft 10 in)	65 kg (143 lb)	308 cm (121 in)	295 cm (116 in)	Outside-spiker
2	(Poland) Mariola Zenik	3 July 1982 (age 43)	1.74 m (5 ft 9 in)	67 kg (148 lb)	300 cm (120 in)	285 cm (112 in)	Libero
3	(Colombia) Madelaynne Montaño	6 January 1983 (age 42)	1.85 m (6 ft 1 in)	68 kg (150 lb)	330 cm (130 in)	310 cm (120 in)	Opposite
4	(Poland) Katarzyna Gajgał	21 September 1981 (age 44)	1.91 m (6 ft 3 in)	85 kg (187 lb)	308 cm (121 in)	298 cm (117 in)	Middle-blocker
6	(Poland) Agnieszka Bednarek	20 February 1986 (age 39)	1.85 m (6 ft 1 in)	70 kg (150 lb)	310 cm (120 in)	303 cm (119 in)	Middle-blocker
8	(Poland) Izabela Bełcik	29 November 1980 (age 44)	1.85 m (6 ft 1 in)	70 kg (150 lb)	304 cm (120 in)	292 cm (115 in)	Setter
9	(Czech Republic) Helena Havelková	25 July 1988 (age 37)	1.86 m (6 ft 1 in)	70 kg (150 lb)	315 cm (124 in)	304 cm (120 in)	Outside-spiker
10	(Dominican Republic) Yonkaira Peña	10 May 1993 (age 32)	1.90 m (6 ft 3 in)	70 kg (150 lb)	320 cm (130 in)	310 cm (120 in)	Outside-spiker
11	(Serbia) Stefana Veljković	9 January 1990 (age 35)	1.90 m (6 ft 3 in)	76 kg (168 lb)	315 cm (124 in)	305 cm (120 in)	Middle-blocker
12	(Poland) Izabela Kowalińska	23 February 1985 (age 40)	1.89 m (6 ft 2 in)	84 kg (185 lb)	312 cm (123 in)	300 cm (120 in)	Opposite
13	(Poland) Katarzyna Mróz	19 February 1981 (age 44)	1.94 m (6 ft 4 in)	77 kg (170 lb)	310 cm (120 in)	301 cm (119 in)	Middle-blocker
14	(Poland) Joanna Wołosz	7 April 1990 (age 35)	1.81 m (5 ft 11 in)	71 kg (157 lb)	303 cm (119 in)	280 cm (110 in)	Setter
16	(Poland) Aleksandra Jagieło	2 June 1980 (age 45)	1.80 m (5 ft 11 in)	68 kg (150 lb)	306 cm (120 in)	295 cm (116 in)	Outside-spiker
19	(Poland) Paulina Maj	22 March 1987 (age 38)	1.66 m (5 ft 5 in)	57 kg (126 lb)	300 cm (120 in)	277 cm (109 in)	Libero

=== Eczacıbaşı VitrA İstanbul ===
The following is the roster of the Turkish club Eczacıbaşı VitrA İstanbul in the 2015–16 CEV Women's Champions League.

Head coach: (Italy) Giovanni Caprara

No.	Name	Date of birth	Height	Weight	Spike	Block	Position
2	(Turkey) Gülden Kuzubaşıoğlu	5 December 1980 (age 44)	1.67 m (5 ft 6 in)	58 kg (128 lb)	250 cm (98 in)	240 cm (94 in)	Libero
3	(Serbia) Tijana Bošković	8 March 1997 (age 28)	1.93 m (6 ft 4 in)	79 kg (174 lb)	320 cm (130 in)	310 cm (120 in)	Opposite
5	(United States) Molly Kreklow	17 February 1992 (age 33)	1.83 m (6 ft 0 in)	70 kg (150 lb)	285 cm (112 in)	280 cm (110 in)	Setter
6	(Turkey) Ceylan Arısan	1 January 1994 (age 31)	1.93 m (6 ft 4 in)	78 kg (172 lb)	305 cm (120 in)	295 cm (116 in)	Middle-blocker
7	(Turkey) Dilara Bağcı	2 February 1994 (age 31)	1.65 m (5 ft 5 in)	63 kg (139 lb)	260 cm (100 in)	245 cm (96 in)	Libero
8	(Turkey) Asuman Karakoyun	16 July 1990 (age 35)	1.80 m (5 ft 11 in)	73 kg (161 lb)	285 cm (112 in)	280 cm (110 in)	Setter
9	(Turkey) Büşra Kılıçlı	16 July 1990 (age 35)	1.88 m (6 ft 2 in)	82 kg (181 lb)	295 cm (116 in)	290 cm (110 in)	Middle-blocker
10	(United States) Jordan Larson	16 October 1986 (age 39)	1.86 m (6 ft 1 in)	74 kg (163 lb)	300 cm (120 in)	290 cm (110 in)	Outside-spiker
11	(Turkey) Hande Baladın	11 September 1997 (age 28)	1.90 m (6 ft 3 in)	77 kg (170 lb)	313 cm (123 in)	302 cm (119 in)	Outside-spiker
12	(Cuba) Rosir Calderón	28 December 1984 (age 40)	1.89 m (6 ft 2 in)	78 kg (172 lb)	320 cm (130 in)	310 cm (120 in)	Outside-spiker
13	(Germany) Christiane Fürst	29 March 1985 (age 40)	1.94 m (6 ft 4 in)	79 kg (174 lb)	313 cm (123 in)	302 cm (119 in)	Middle-blocker
15	(Turkey) Neriman Özsoy	13 July 1988 (age 37)	1.88 m (6 ft 2 in)	74 kg (163 lb)	305 cm (120 in)	305 cm (120 in)	Outside-spiker
17	(Turkey) Neslihan Demir	9 December 1983 (age 41)	1.87 m (6 ft 2 in)	72 kg (159 lb)	300 cm (120 in)	290 cm (110 in)	Opposite
18	(Croatia) Maja Poljak	2 May 1983 (age 42)	1.94 m (6 ft 4 in)	76 kg (168 lb)	310 cm (120 in)	305 cm (120 in)	Middle-blocker
19	(Turkey) Nilay Özdemir	24 October 1985 (age 40)	1.80 m (5 ft 11 in)	63 kg (139 lb)	285 cm (112 in)	280 cm (110 in)	Setter

=== Pomi Casalmaggiore ===
The following is the roster of the Italian club Pomi Casalmaggiore in the 2015–16 CEV Women's Champions League.

Head coach: (Italy) Massimo Barbolini

No.	Name	Date of birth	Height	Weight	Spike	Block	Position
1	(Italy) Lucia Bacchi	4 January 1981 (age 44)	1.81 m (5 ft 11 in)	74 kg (163 lb)	295 cm (116 in)	276 cm (109 in)	Outside-spiker
3	(United States) Carli Lloyd	6 August 1989 (age 36)	1.78 m (5 ft 10 in)	75 kg (165 lb)	303 cm (119 in)	287 cm (113 in)	Setter
5	(Italy) Immacolata Sirressi	19 May 1990 (age 35)	1.76 m (5 ft 9 in)	62 kg (137 lb)	281 cm (111 in)	264 cm (104 in)	Libero
6	(Italy) Giada Cecchetto	6 June 1991 (age 34)	1.63 m (5 ft 4 in)	57 kg (126 lb)	268 cm (106 in)	259 cm (102 in)	Libero
8	(United States) Lauren Gibbemeyer	8 September 1989 (age 36)	1.87 m (6 ft 2 in)	71 kg (157 lb)	307 cm (121 in)	293 cm (115 in)	Middle-blocker
10	(Italy) Carlotta Cambi	28 May 1996 (age 29)	1.76 m (5 ft 9 in)	66 kg (146 lb)	298 cm (117 in)	287 cm (113 in)	Setter
12	(Italy) Francesca Piccinini	10 January 1979 (age 46)	1.85 m (6 ft 1 in)	71 kg (157 lb)	304 cm (120 in)	297 cm (117 in)	Outside-spiker
13	(Italy) Rossella Olivotto	27 April 1991 (age 34)	1.84 m (6 ft 0 in)	71 kg (157 lb)	304 cm (120 in)	297 cm (117 in)	Middle-blocker
14	(Germany) Margareta Kozuch	30 October 1986 (age 38)	1.87 m (6 ft 2 in)	70 kg (150 lb)	309 cm (122 in)	297 cm (117 in)	Opposite
15	(Serbia) Jovana Stevanović	30 June 1992 (age 33)	1.91 m (6 ft 3 in)	75 kg (165 lb)	308 cm (121 in)	295 cm (116 in)	Middle-blocker
16	(Italy) Valentina Tirozzi	26 March 1986 (age 39)	1.82 m (6 ft 0 in)	69 kg (152 lb)	296 cm (117 in)	277 cm (109 in)	Outside-spiker
18	(Czech Republic) Tereza Rossi	3 December 1982 (age 42)	1.90 m (6 ft 3 in)	82 kg (181 lb)	307 cm (121 in)	295 cm (116 in)	Opposite

== Pool D ==
=== RC Cannes ===
The following is the roster of the French club RC Cannes in the 2015–16 CEV Women's Champions League.

Head coach: (China) Yan Fang

No.	Name	Date of birth	Height	Weight	Spike	Block	Position
1	(France) Myriam Kloster	4 August 1989 (age 36)	1.88 m (6 ft 2 in)	78 kg (172 lb)	318 cm (125 in)	308 cm (121 in)	Middle-blocker
2	(France) Margaux Buzinac	4 September 1996 (age 29)	1.80 m (5 ft 11 in)	80 kg (180 lb)	300 cm (120 in)	290 cm (110 in)	Setter
3	(France) Lucille Gicquel	13 November 1997 (age 27)	1.89 m (6 ft 2 in)	71 kg (157 lb)	325 cm (128 in)	315 cm (124 in)	Outside-spiker
4	(Italy) Marika Bianchini	23 April 1993 (age 32)	1.78 m (5 ft 10 in)	70 kg (150 lb)	310 cm (120 in)	300 cm (120 in)	Outside-spiker
5	(Ukraine) Viktoriya Delros	12 May 1993 (age 32)	1.72 m (5 ft 8 in)	66 kg (146 lb)	300 cm (120 in)	290 cm (110 in)	Libero
6	(France) Déborah Ortschitt	10 June 1987 (age 38)	1.65 m (5 ft 5 in)	61 kg (134 lb)	300 cm (120 in)	290 cm (110 in)	Libero
7	(Serbia) Sanja Bursać	10 January 1990 (age 35)	1.78 m (5 ft 10 in)	65 kg (143 lb)	305 cm (120 in)	295 cm (116 in)	Outside-spiker
9	(Italy) Letizia Camera	1 October 1992 (age 33)	1.75 m (5 ft 9 in)	61 kg (134 lb)	300 cm (120 in)	290 cm (110 in)	Setter
11	(Sweden) Alexandra Lazic	24 September 1994 (age 31)	1.89 m (6 ft 2 in)	72 kg (159 lb)	328 cm (129 in)	318 cm (125 in)	Outside-spiker
14	(Cuba) Rachel Sánchez	9 January 1989 (age 36)	1.88 m (6 ft 2 in)	81 kg (179 lb)	320 cm (130 in)	310 cm (120 in)	Middle-blocker
15	(Slovenia) Sara Hutinski	20 June 1991 (age 34)	1.86 m (6 ft 1 in)	75 kg (165 lb)	318 cm (125 in)	308 cm (121 in)	Middle-blocker
16	(Ukraine) Nadiia Kodola	29 September 1988 (age 37)	1.84 m (6 ft 0 in)	78 kg (172 lb)	318 cm (125 in)	308 cm (121 in)	Outside-spiker
17	(Bulgaria) Gergana Dimitrova	28 February 1996 (age 29)	1.84 m (6 ft 0 in)	75 kg (165 lb)	315 cm (124 in)	305 cm (120 in)	Outside-spiker
18	(France) Romane Ruiz	5 January 1997 (age 28)	1.78 m (5 ft 10 in)	60 kg (130 lb)	283 cm (111 in)	273 cm (107 in)	Libero

=== Uralochka-NTMK Ekaterinburg ===
The following is the roster of the Russian club Uralochka-NTMK Ekaterinburg in the 2015–16 CEV Women's Champions League.

Head coach: (Russia) Nikolay Karpol

No.	Name	Date of birth	Height	Weight	Spike	Block	Position
1	(Russia) Valeriya Safonova	28 March 1992 (age 33)	1.83 m (6 ft 0 in)	68 kg (150 lb)	298 cm (117 in)	294 cm (116 in)	Middle-blocker
3	(Russia) Ekaterina Rusakova	15 December 1990 (age 34)	1.82 m (6 ft 0 in)	71 kg (157 lb)	297 cm (117 in)	291 cm (115 in)	Setter
4	(Russia) Ekaterina Romanova	26 January 1986 (age 39)	1.75 m (5 ft 9 in)	64 kg (141 lb)	285 cm (112 in)	282 cm (111 in)	Libero
5	(Russia) Elena Irisova	15 December 1987 (age 37)	1.87 m (6 ft 2 in)	76 kg (168 lb)	305 cm (120 in)	309 cm (122 in)	Middle-blocker
6	(Russia) Irina Zaryazhko	10 April 1991 (age 34)	1.96 m (6 ft 5 in)	78 kg (172 lb)	310 cm (120 in)	308 cm (121 in)	Middle-blocker
7	(Russia) Olga Sazhina	19 February 1986 (age 39)	1.90 m (6 ft 3 in)	72 kg (159 lb)	303 cm (119 in)	293 cm (115 in)	Outside-spiker
8	(Trinidad and Tobago) Sinead Jack	8 November 1993 (age 31)	1.90 m (6 ft 3 in)	78 kg (172 lb)	320 cm (130 in)	315 cm (124 in)	Middle-blocker
9	(Russia) Daria Evtukhova	22 April 1991 (age 34)	1.92 m (6 ft 4 in)	72 kg (159 lb)	305 cm (120 in)	295 cm (116 in)	Outside-spiker
11	(Belarus) Anna Klimets	4 March 1998 (age 27)	1.86 m (6 ft 1 in)	70 kg (150 lb)	304 cm (120 in)	298 cm (117 in)	Opposite
12	(Russia) Marina Babeshina	26 June 1985 (age 40)	1.80 m (5 ft 11 in)	65 kg (143 lb)	295 cm (116 in)	280 cm (110 in)	Setter
13	(Russia) Ksenia Ilchenko	31 October 1994 (age 30)	1.83 m (6 ft 0 in)	70 kg (150 lb)	306 cm (120 in)	300 cm (120 in)	Outside-spiker
14	(Russia) Anastasiia Kostylenko	7 May 1993 (age 32)	1.72 m (5 ft 8 in)	68 kg (150 lb)	285 cm (112 in)	288 cm (113 in)	Setter
15	(Russia) Evgeniya Bochkareva	9 April 1996 (age 29)	1.85 m (6 ft 1 in)	76 kg (168 lb)	303 cm (119 in)	297 cm (117 in)	Outside-spiker
16	(Russia) Ekaterina Voronova	15 January 1994 (age 31)	1.75 m (5 ft 9 in)	62 kg (137 lb)	280 cm (110 in)	290 cm (110 in)	Libero

=== Vizura Beograd ===
The following is the roster of the Serbian club Vizura Beograd in the 2015–16 CEV Women's Champions League.

Head coach: (Serbia) Željko Tanasković

No.	Name	Date of birth	Height	Weight	Spike	Block	Position
1	(Serbia) Jovana Kocić	24 February 1998 (age 27)	1.90 m (6 ft 3 in)	74 kg (163 lb)	310 cm (120 in)	306 cm (120 in)	Middle-blocker
2	(Serbia) Ana Jeković	1 November 1997 (age 27)	1.85 m (6 ft 1 in)	76 kg (168 lb)	290 cm (110 in)	290 cm (110 in)	Middle-blocker
4	(Serbia) Sara Lozo	29 April 1997 (age 28)	1.85 m (6 ft 1 in)	75 kg (165 lb)	309 cm (122 in)	306 cm (120 in)	Opposite
5	(Serbia) Staša Miljević	8 October 1997 (age 28)	1.87 m (6 ft 2 in)	73 kg (161 lb)	301 cm (119 in)	297 cm (117 in)	Middle-blocker
6	(Serbia) Maja Aleksić	6 June 1997 (age 28)	1.88 m (6 ft 2 in)	75 kg (165 lb)	310 cm (120 in)	306 cm (120 in)	Middle-blocker
7	(Serbia) Katarina Lazović	12 September 1999 (age 26)	1.82 m (6 ft 0 in)	67 kg (148 lb)	307 cm (121 in)	299 cm (118 in)	Outside-spiker
8	(Serbia) Liljana Ranković	8 April 1993 (age 32)	1.80 m (5 ft 11 in)	69 kg (152 lb)	303 cm (119 in)	293 cm (115 in)	Outside-spiker
10	(Serbia) Nataša Čikiriz	26 June 1995 (age 30)	1.94 m (6 ft 4 in)	73 kg (161 lb)	309 cm (122 in)	303 cm (119 in)	Outside-spiker
14	(Serbia) Aleksandra Ćirović	30 September 1997 (age 28)	1.78 m (5 ft 10 in)	63 kg (139 lb)	288 cm (113 in)	280 cm (110 in)	Setter
15	(Serbia) Ana Matović	18 January 1993 (age 32)	1.85 m (6 ft 1 in)	75 kg (165 lb)	301 cm (119 in)	291 cm (115 in)	Opposite
16	(Serbia) Milena Dimić	31 August 1997 (age 28)	1.68 m (5 ft 6 in)	69 kg (152 lb)	256 cm (101 in)	245 cm (96 in)	Libero
17	(Serbia) Jelena Vignjević	7 June 1996 (age 29)	1.78 m (5 ft 10 in)	70 kg (150 lb)	290 cm (110 in)	291 cm (115 in)	Setter
20	(Serbia) Teodora Pusić	12 March 1993 (age 32)	1.70 m (5 ft 7 in)	62 kg (137 lb)	260 cm (100 in)	245 cm (96 in)	Libero

=== Voléro Zürich ===
The following is the roster of the Swiss club Voléro Zürich in the 2015–16 CEV Women's Champions League.

Head coach: (Netherlands) Avital Selinger

No.	Name	Date of birth	Height	Weight	Spike	Block	Position
1	(Bulgaria) Petya Barakova	18 June 1994 (age 31)	1.76 m (5 ft 9 in)	71 kg (157 lb)	280 cm (110 in)	269 cm (106 in)	Setter
3	(Brazil) Fabíola de Souza	3 February 1983 (age 42)	1.84 m (6 ft 0 in)	70 kg (150 lb)	300 cm (120 in)	285 cm (112 in)	Setter
4	(Serbia) Bojana Živković	29 March 1988 (age 37)	1.86 m (6 ft 1 in)	72 kg (159 lb)	300 cm (120 in)	292 cm (115 in)	Setter
5	(Bulgaria) Dobriana Rabadzhieva	14 June 1991 (age 34)	1.94 m (6 ft 4 in)	72 kg (159 lb)	305 cm (120 in)	285 cm (112 in)	Outside-spiker
7	(Ukraine) Olesia Rykhliuk	11 December 1987 (age 37)	1.96 m (6 ft 5 in)	83 kg (183 lb)	316 cm (124 in)	304 cm (120 in)	Opposite
8	(Serbia) Silvija Popović	15 March 1986 (age 39)	1.78 m (5 ft 10 in)	65 kg (143 lb)	236 cm (93 in)	226 cm (89 in)	Libero
9	(Azerbaijan) Natalya Mammadova	2 December 1984 (age 40)	1.96 m (6 ft 5 in)	78 kg (172 lb)	319 cm (126 in)	302 cm (119 in)	Outside-spiker
11	(United States) Natalie Hagglund	1 July 1992 (age 33)	1.78 m (5 ft 10 in)	68 kg (150 lb)	292 cm (115 in)	290 cm (110 in)	Libero
12	(Serbia) Ana Antonijević	26 August 1987 (age 38)	1.85 m (6 ft 1 in)	70 kg (150 lb)	295 cm (116 in)	283 cm (111 in)	Setter
13	(Switzerland) Inès Granvorka	13 August 1991 (age 34)	1.79 m (5 ft 10 in)	70 kg (150 lb)	303 cm (119 in)	283 cm (111 in)	Outside-spiker
14	(Switzerland) Julie Lengweiler	6 November 1998 (age 26)	1.86 m (6 ft 1 in)	70 kg (150 lb)	302 cm (119 in)	285 cm (112 in)	Opposite
15	(Russia) Ekaterina Orlova	21 October 1987 (age 38)	1.93 m (6 ft 4 in)	77 kg (170 lb)	307 cm (121 in)	301 cm (119 in)	Middle-blocker
16	(United States) Foluke Akinradewo	5 October 1987 (age 38)	1.91 m (6 ft 3 in)	79 kg (174 lb)	331 cm (130 in)	300 cm (120 in)	Middle-blocker
17	(Switzerland) Laura Unternährer	11 July 1993 (age 32)	1.79 m (5 ft 10 in)	70 kg (150 lb)	303 cm (119 in)	283 cm (111 in)	Outside-spiker
18	(Russia) Yuliya Podskalnaya	18 April 1989 (age 36)	1.90 m (6 ft 3 in)	75 kg (165 lb)	306 cm (120 in)	295 cm (116 in)	Middle-blocker
19	(United States) Krista Vansant	31 March 1993 (age 32)	1.88 m (6 ft 2 in)	75 kg (165 lb)	310 cm (120 in)	300 cm (120 in)	Outside-spiker

== Pool E ==
=== Dresdner SC ===
The following is the roster of the German club Dresdner SC in the 2015–16 CEV Women's Champions League.

Head coach: (Germany) Alexander Waibl

No.	Name	Date of birth	Height	Weight	Spike	Block	Position
1	(Germany) Mareike Hindriksen	14 November 1987 (age 37)	1.82 m (6 ft 0 in)	62 kg (137 lb)	308 cm (121 in)	296 cm (117 in)	Setter
3	(Belarus) Kristina Mikhailenko	26 March 1992 (age 33)	1.88 m (6 ft 2 in)	70 kg (150 lb)	317 cm (125 in)	303 cm (119 in)	Opposite
7	(Netherlands) Laura Dijkema	18 February 1990 (age 35)	1.84 m (6 ft 0 in)	70 kg (150 lb)	310 cm (120 in)	298 cm (117 in)	Setter
8	(Germany) Louisa Lippmann	23 September 1994 (age 31)	1.91 m (6 ft 3 in)	78 kg (172 lb)	319 cm (126 in)	307 cm (121 in)	Opposite
9	(Netherlands) Myrthe Schoot	29 August 1988 (age 37)	1.84 m (6 ft 0 in)	69 kg (152 lb)	298 cm (117 in)	286 cm (113 in)	Libero
10	(United States) Kathleen Slay	4 November 1991 (age 33)	1.98 m (6 ft 6 in)	82 kg (181 lb)	321 cm (126 in)	310 cm (120 in)	Middle-blocker
11	(United States) Whitney Little	3 April 1993 (age 32)	1.90 m (6 ft 3 in)	75 kg (165 lb)	319 cm (126 in)	309 cm (122 in)	Middle-blocker
12	(Canada) Jennifer Cross	4 July 1992 (age 33)	1.95 m (6 ft 5 in)	78 kg (172 lb)	319 cm (126 in)	306 cm (120 in)	Middle-blocker
13	(Germany) Lisa Izquierdo	29 August 1994 (age 31)	1.80 m (5 ft 11 in)	60 kg (130 lb)	308 cm (121 in)	294 cm (116 in)	Outside-spiker
14	(Germany) Lisa Stock	6 June 1994 (age 31)	1.70 m (5 ft 7 in)	50 kg (110 lb)	280 cm (110 in)	267 cm (105 in)	Libero
15	(United States) Michelle Bartsch	12 February 1990 (age 35)	1.93 m (6 ft 4 in)	73 kg (161 lb)	318 cm (125 in)	305 cm (120 in)	Outside-spiker
16	(Germany) Katharina Schwabe	29 April 1993 (age 32)	1.80 m (5 ft 11 in)	66 kg (146 lb)	311 cm (122 in)	302 cm (119 in)	Outside-spiker
17	(United States) Gina Mancuso	31 May 1991 (age 34)	1.83 m (6 ft 0 in)	70 kg (150 lb)	315 cm (124 in)	301 cm (119 in)	Outside-spiker
18	(Belgium) Valerie Courtois	1 November 1990 (age 34)	1.71 m (5 ft 7 in)	66 kg (146 lb)	280 cm (110 in)	270 cm (110 in)	Libero

=== Fenerbahçe Grundig Istanbul ===
The following is the roster of the Turkish club Fenerbahçe Grundig Istanbul in the 2015–16 CEV Women's Champions League.

Head coach: (Italy) Marcello Abbondanza

No.	Name	Date of birth	Height	Weight	Spike	Block	Position
1	(Turkey) Merve Dalbeler	27 June 1987 (age 38)	1.80 m (5 ft 11 in)	70 kg (150 lb)	295 cm (116 in)	248 cm (98 in)	Libero
2	(Turkey) Gizem Karadayı	14 January 1987 (age 38)	1.76 m (5 ft 9 in)	65 kg (143 lb)	290 cm (110 in)	245 cm (96 in)	Libero
5	(Turkey) Ergül Avcı	24 July 1987 (age 38)	1.90 m (6 ft 3 in)	72 kg (159 lb)	309 cm (122 in)	288 cm (113 in)	Middle-blocker
6	(Turkey) Polen Uslupehlivan	27 August 1990 (age 35)	1.92 m (6 ft 4 in)	68 kg (150 lb)	315 cm (124 in)	300 cm (120 in)	Opposite
8	(Turkey) Dicle Nur Babat	15 September 1992 (age 33)	1.91 m (6 ft 3 in)	81 kg (179 lb)	318 cm (125 in)	305 cm (120 in)	Middle-blocker
9	(Turkey) Meliha İsmailoğlu	17 September 1993 (age 32)	1.88 m (6 ft 2 in)	71 kg (157 lb)	300 cm (120 in)	290 cm (110 in)	Outside-spiker
10	(South Korea) Kim Yeon-Koung	26 February 1988 (age 37)	1.92 m (6 ft 4 in)	73 kg (161 lb)	335 cm (132 in)	315 cm (124 in)	Outside-spiker
11	(Turkey) Ezgi Dilik	12 June 1995 (age 30)	1.70 m (5 ft 7 in)	68 kg (150 lb)	282 cm (111 in)	278 cm (109 in)	Setter
12	(Serbia) Brankica Mihajlović	13 April 1991 (age 34)	1.89 m (6 ft 2 in)	72 kg (159 lb)	316 cm (124 in)	302 cm (119 in)	Opposite
13	(United States) Christa Harmotto	12 October 1986 (age 39)	1.90 m (6 ft 3 in)	79 kg (174 lb)	326 cm (128 in)	309 cm (122 in)	Middle-blocker
14	(Turkey) Eda Erdem Dündar	22 June 1987 (age 38)	1.88 m (6 ft 2 in)	75 kg (165 lb)	308 cm (121 in)	301 cm (119 in)	Middle-blocker
15	(Turkey) Şeyma Ercan	5 July 1994 (age 31)	1.86 m (6 ft 1 in)	69 kg (152 lb)	303 cm (119 in)	290 cm (110 in)	Outside-spiker
16	(Italy) Lucia Bosetti	9 July 1989 (age 36)	1.76 m (5 ft 9 in)	59 kg (130 lb)	306 cm (120 in)	286 cm (113 in)	Outside-spiker
18	(Poland) Katarzyna Skorupa	16 September 1984 (age 41)	1.82 m (6 ft 0 in)	69 kg (152 lb)	302 cm (119 in)	296 cm (117 in)	Setter

=== Impel Wrocław ===
The following is the roster of the Polish club Impel Wrocław in the 2015–16 CEV Women's Champions League.

Head coach: (Italy) Nicola Negro

No.	Name	Date of birth	Height	Weight	Spike	Block	Position
1	(Czech Republic) Andrea Kossanyiová	6 August 1993 (age 32)	1.85 m (6 ft 1 in)	65 kg (143 lb)	306 cm (120 in)	300 cm (120 in)	Outside-spiker
3	(Poland) Monika Ptak	14 May 1990 (age 35)	1.88 m (6 ft 2 in)	76 kg (168 lb)	310 cm (120 in)	303 cm (119 in)	Middle-blocker
4	(Poland) Karolina Piśla	8 May 1996 (age 29)	1.84 m (6 ft 0 in)	65 kg (143 lb)	305 cm (120 in)	295 cm (116 in)	Outside-spiker
5	(Poland) Agnieszka Kąkolewska	17 October 1994 (age 31)	2.00 m (6 ft 7 in)	85 kg (187 lb)	320 cm (130 in)	305 cm (120 in)	Middle-blocker
6	(Poland) Barbara Cembrzyńska	19 May 1997 (age 28)	1.85 m (6 ft 1 in)	65 kg (143 lb)	303 cm (119 in)	283 cm (111 in)	Opposite
7	(Poland) Joanna Kaczor	16 September 1984 (age 41)	1.91 m (6 ft 3 in)	72 kg (159 lb)	315 cm (124 in)	302 cm (119 in)	Opposite
8	(Germany) Lenka Dürr	10 December 1990 (age 34)	1.71 m (5 ft 7 in)	59 kg (130 lb)	286 cm (113 in)	275 cm (108 in)	Libero
9	(Poland) Agata Sawicka	17 January 1985 (age 40)	1.81 m (5 ft 11 in)	74 kg (163 lb)	285 cm (112 in)	274 cm (108 in)	Libero
10	(United States) Kristin Hildebrand	30 June 1985 (age 40)	1.85 m (6 ft 1 in)	68 kg (150 lb)	305 cm (120 in)	300 cm (120 in)	Outside-spiker
11	(Poland) Aleksandra Sikorska	28 April 1993 (age 32)	1.86 m (6 ft 1 in)	68 kg (150 lb)	306 cm (120 in)	300 cm (120 in)	Middle-blocker
12	(Poland) Milena Radecka	18 October 1984 (age 41)	1.78 m (5 ft 10 in)	67 kg (148 lb)	304 cm (120 in)	297 cm (117 in)	Setter
13	(Poland) Magdalena Gryka	28 March 1994 (age 31)	1.78 m (5 ft 10 in)	65 kg (143 lb)	302 cm (119 in)	295 cm (116 in)	Setter
14	(Poland) Aleksandra Sochacka	5 May 1997 (age 28)	1.81 m (5 ft 11 in)	70 kg (150 lb)	295 cm (116 in)	282 cm (111 in)	Outside-spiker
15	(Poland) Magda Stasiak	10 July 1995 (age 30)	1.63 m (5 ft 4 in)	58 kg (128 lb)	275 cm (108 in)	260 cm (100 in)	Libero
17	(Poland) Katarzyna Skowrońska-Dolata	30 June 1983 (age 42)	1.89 m (6 ft 2 in)	75 kg (165 lb)	317 cm (125 in)	302 cm (119 in)	Opposite
18	(Italy) Carolina Costagrande	15 October 1980 (age 45)	1.88 m (6 ft 2 in)	78 kg (172 lb)	312 cm (123 in)	300 cm (120 in)	Outside-spiker

=== Telekom Baku ===
The following is the roster of the Azerí club Telekom Baku in the 2015–16 CEV Women's Champions League.

Head coach: (Serbia) Zoran Gajic

No.	Name	Date of birth	Height	Weight	Spike	Block	Position
1	(Azerbaijan) Anastasiia Baidiuk	5 December 1999 (age 25)	1.89 m (6 ft 2 in)	67 kg (148 lb)	303 cm (119 in)	295 cm (116 in)	Outside-spiker
2	(Azerbaijan) Krystsina Yagubova	13 February 1996 (age 29)	1.84 m (6 ft 0 in)	69 kg (152 lb)	295 cm (116 in)	285 cm (112 in)	Setter
3	(Azerbaijan) Yelyzaveta Samadova	3 March 1995 (age 30)	1.85 m (6 ft 1 in)	72 kg (159 lb)	305 cm (120 in)	290 cm (110 in)	Outside-spiker
5	(Azerbaijan) Marharyta Azizova	25 April 1993 (age 32)	1.86 m (6 ft 1 in)	73 kg (161 lb)	308 cm (121 in)	289 cm (114 in)	Outside-spiker
7	(Bulgaria) Gabriela Koeva	25 July 1989 (age 36)	1.85 m (6 ft 1 in)	66 kg (146 lb)	297 cm (117 in)	293 cm (115 in)	Middle-blocker
8	(Bulgaria) Mariya Filipova	10 September 1982 (age 43)	1.79 m (5 ft 10 in)	67 kg (148 lb)	289 cm (114 in)	280 cm (110 in)	Libero
9	(Azerbaijan) Anastasiya Bezsonova	21 December 1999 (age 25)	1.87 m (6 ft 2 in)	68 kg (150 lb)	295 cm (116 in)	285 cm (112 in)	Outside-spiker
10	(Cuba) Ana Cleger	27 November 1989 (age 35)	1.85 m (6 ft 1 in)	73 kg (161 lb)	306 cm (120 in)	301 cm (119 in)	Opposite
11	(Azerbaijan) Olena Hasanova	25 November 1995 (age 29)	1.88 m (6 ft 2 in)	73 kg (161 lb)	305 cm (120 in)	285 cm (112 in)	Middle-blocker
12	(Montenegro) Ksenija Ivanović	22 May 1986 (age 39)	1.88 m (6 ft 2 in)	78 kg (172 lb)	315 cm (124 in)	310 cm (120 in)	Outside-spiker
14	(Azerbaijan) Bayaz Aliyeva	9 June 1990 (age 35)	1.76 m (5 ft 9 in)	60 kg (130 lb)	255 cm (100 in)	245 cm (96 in)	Libero
15	(Czech Republic) Lucie Mühlsteinová	15 October 1984 (age 41)	1.78 m (5 ft 10 in)	70 kg (150 lb)	294 cm (116 in)	281 cm (111 in)	Setter
17	(Bulgaria) Hristina Ruseva	1 October 1991 (age 34)	1.90 m (6 ft 3 in)	77 kg (170 lb)	305 cm (120 in)	290 cm (110 in)	Middle-blocker

== Pool F ==
=== CS Volei Alba Blaj ===
The following is the roster of the Romanian club CS Volei Alba Blaj in the 2015–16 CEV Women's Champions League.

Head coach: (Serbia) Darko Zakoč

No.	Name	Date of birth	Height	Weight	Spike	Block	Position
2	(Romania) Adina Salaoru	5 August 1989 (age 36)	1.833 m (6 ft 0 in)	63 kg (139 lb)	305 cm (120 in)	301 cm (119 in)	Outside-spiker
3	(Serbia) Jovana Vesović	21 June 1987 (age 38)	1.83 m (6 ft 0 in)	68 kg (150 lb)	283 cm (111 in)	268 cm (106 in)	Outside-spiker
4	(Argentina) Leticia Boscacci	8 November 1985 (age 39)	1.86 m (6 ft 1 in)	70 kg (150 lb)	302 cm (119 in)	284 cm (112 in)	Opposite
5	(Romania) Denisa Viloiu	19 March 1994 (age 31)	1.77 m (5 ft 10 in)	57 kg (126 lb)	290 cm (110 in)	260 cm (100 in)	Setter
6	(Romania) Anamaria Berdilă	8 August 1993 (age 32)	1.75 m (5 ft 9 in)	55 kg (121 lb)	290 cm (110 in)	270 cm (110 in)	Outside-spiker
8	(Croatia) Ana Grbac	23 March 1988 (age 37)	1.87 m (6 ft 2 in)	64 kg (141 lb)	302 cm (119 in)	288 cm (113 in)	Setter
9	(Serbia) Dubravka Đurić	25 November 1991 (age 33)	1.90 m (6 ft 3 in)	71 kg (157 lb)	304 cm (120 in)	285 cm (112 in)	Middle-blocker
11	(Romania) Ioana Nemțanu	1 January 1989 (age 36)	1.81 m (5 ft 11 in)	72 kg (159 lb)	299 cm (118 in)	275 cm (108 in)	Outside-spiker
15	(Romania) Adriana Bobi	11 February 1988 (age 37)	1.84 m (6 ft 0 in)	71 kg (157 lb)	287 cm (113 in)	274 cm (108 in)	Middle-blocker
16	(Serbia) Marina Vujović	23 January 1984 (age 41)	1.63 m (5 ft 4 in)	59 kg (130 lb)	279 cm (110 in)	257 cm (101 in)	Libero
17	(Czech Republic) Ivana Plchotová	28 October 1982 (age 42)	1.92 m (6 ft 4 in)	73 kg (161 lb)	307 cm (121 in)	299 cm (118 in)	Middle-blocker
18	(Bulgaria) Silvana Chausheva	19 May 1995 (age 30)	1.86 m (6 ft 1 in)	69 kg (152 lb)	303 cm (119 in)	285 cm (112 in)	Opposite

=== Dinamo Moscow ===
The following is the roster of the Russian club Dinamo Moscow in the 2015–16 CEV Women's Champions League.

Head coach: (Russia) Yury Panchenko

No.	Name	Date of birth	Height	Weight	Spike	Block	Position
1	(Russia) Iuliia Morozova	8 January 1985 (age 40)	1.92 m (6 ft 4 in)	78 kg (172 lb)	303 cm (119 in)	301 cm (119 in)	Middle-blocker
2	(Russia) Anastasia Bavykina	6 July 1992 (age 33)	1.88 m (6 ft 2 in)	79 kg (174 lb)	303 cm (119 in)	301 cm (119 in)	Outside-spiker
3	(Russia) Anna Malova	16 April 1990 (age 35)	1.75 m (5 ft 9 in)	59 kg (130 lb)	285 cm (112 in)	280 cm (110 in)	Libero
4	(Russia) Anastasiia Maksimova	23 May 1998 (age 27)	1.70 m (5 ft 7 in)	52 kg (115 lb)	285 cm (112 in)	280 cm (110 in)	Libero
5	(Russia) Anastasia Markova	16 October 1987 (age 38)	1.90 m (6 ft 3 in)	77 kg (170 lb)	302 cm (119 in)	300 cm (120 in)	Outside-spiker
6	(Russia) Yana Shcherban	6 September 1989 (age 36)	1.87 m (6 ft 2 in)	71 kg (157 lb)	304 cm (120 in)	300 cm (120 in)	Outside-spiker
7	(Russia) Ekaterina Romanenko	23 December 1993 (age 31)	1.70 m (5 ft 7 in)	65 kg (143 lb)	285 cm (112 in)	280 cm (110 in)	Libero
8	(Russia) Nataliya Obmochaeva	1 June 1989 (age 36)	1.96 m (6 ft 5 in)	75 kg (165 lb)	312 cm (123 in)	308 cm (121 in)	Opposite
9	(Russia) Vera Vetrova	21 August 1986 (age 39)	1.82 m (6 ft 0 in)	68 kg (150 lb)	297 cm (117 in)	295 cm (116 in)	Setter
10	(Russia) Ekaterina Kosianenko	2 February 1990 (age 35)	1.75 m (5 ft 9 in)	76 kg (168 lb)	275 cm (108 in)	270 cm (110 in)	Setter
11	(Russia) Ekaterina Lyubushkina	1 February 1990 (age 35)	1.88 m (6 ft 2 in)	81 kg (179 lb)	300 cm (120 in)	298 cm (117 in)	Middle-blocker
13	(Russia) Irina Fetisova	7 September 1994 (age 31)	1.90 m (6 ft 3 in)	76 kg (168 lb)	304 cm (120 in)	300 cm (120 in)	Middle-blocker
14	(Russia) Polina Prokudina	18 December 1998 (age 26)	1.91 m (6 ft 3 in)	79 kg (174 lb)	304 cm (120 in)	300 cm (120 in)	Outside-spiker
15	(Russia) Anna Lazareva	31 January 1997 (age 28)	1.90 m (6 ft 3 in)	67 kg (148 lb)	310 cm (120 in)	305 cm (120 in)	Outside-spiker
16	(Brazil) Fernanda Garay	10 May 1986 (age 39)	1.80 m (5 ft 11 in)	73 kg (161 lb)	320 cm (130 in)	300 cm (120 in)	Outside-spiker
17	(Russia) Regina Moroz	14 January 1987 (age 38)	1.88 m (6 ft 2 in)	76 kg (168 lb)	301 cm (119 in)	300 cm (120 in)	Middle-blocker

=== Nordmeccanica Piacenza ===
The following is the roster of the Italian club Nordmeccanica Piacenza in the 2015–16 CEV Women's Champions League.

Head coach: (Italy) Marco Gaspari

No.	Name	Date of birth	Height	Weight	Spike	Block	Position
1	(Italy) Indre Sorokaite	2 July 1988 (age 37)	1.88 m (6 ft 2 in)	76 kg (168 lb)	250 cm (98 in)	240 cm (94 in)	Outside-spiker
2	(Italy) Federica Valeriano	15 October 1985 (age 40)	1.79 m (5 ft 10 in)	69 kg (152 lb)	239 cm (94 in)	229 cm (90 in)	Outside-spiker
3	(Netherlands) Yvon Beliën	28 December 1993 (age 31)	1.88 m (6 ft 2 in)	74 kg (163 lb)	250 cm (98 in)	240 cm (94 in)	Middle-blocker
4	(France) Christina Bauer	1 January 1988 (age 37)	1.96 m (6 ft 5 in)	84 kg (185 lb)	270 cm (110 in)	260 cm (100 in)	Middle-blocker
6	(Italy) Giulia Leonardi	1 December 1987 (age 37)	1.65 m (5 ft 5 in)	58 kg (128 lb)	225 cm (89 in)	215 cm (85 in)	Libero
7	(Italy) Francesca Marcon	9 July 1983 (age 42)	1.80 m (5 ft 11 in)	70 kg (150 lb)	240 cm (94 in)	230 cm (91 in)	Outside-spiker
9	(Italy) Laura Melandri	31 January 1995 (age 30)	1.86 m (6 ft 1 in)	73 kg (161 lb)	248 cm (98 in)	238 cm (94 in)	Middle-blocker
10	(Italy) Virginia Poggi	29 March 1995 (age 30)	1.63 m (5 ft 4 in)	58 kg (128 lb)	220 cm (87 in)	210 cm (83 in)	Libero
11	(Italy) Alessandra Petrucci	11 February 1983 (age 42)	1.85 m (6 ft 1 in)	73 kg (161 lb)	245 cm (96 in)	235 cm (93 in)	Setter
12	(Italy) Giulia Pascucci	29 September 1993 (age 32)	1.88 m (6 ft 2 in)	76 kg (168 lb)	250 cm (98 in)	240 cm (94 in)	Outside-spiker
14	(Netherlands) Floortje Meijners	16 January 1987 (age 38)	1.90 m (6 ft 3 in)	77 kg (170 lb)	243 cm (96 in)	253 cm (100 in)	Outside-spiker
16	(Italy) Veronica Taborelli	22 March 1994 (age 31)	1.85 m (6 ft 1 in)	73 kg (161 lb)	245 cm (96 in)	235 cm (93 in)	Outside-spiker
18	(Serbia) Maja Ognjenović	6 August 1984 (age 41)	1.83 m (6 ft 0 in)	72 kg (159 lb)	240 cm (94 in)	238 cm (94 in)	Setter

=== Rocheville Le Cannet ===
The following is the roster of the French club Rocheville Le Cannet in the 2015–16 CEV Women's Champions League.

Head coach: (Italy) Riccardo Marchesi

No.	Name	Date of birth	Height	Weight	Spike	Block	Position
1	(Dominican Republic) Jineiry Martínez	3 December 1997 (age 27)	1.90 m (6 ft 3 in)	68 kg (150 lb)	305 cm (120 in)	280 cm (110 in)	Middle-blocker
2	(France) Karine Psila	2 March 1989 (age 36)	1.70 m (5 ft 7 in)	70 kg (150 lb)	260 cm (100 in)	250 cm (98 in)	Outside-spiker
3	(France) Marjorie Molina	29 November 1980 (age 44)	1.71 m (5 ft 7 in)	67 kg (148 lb)	280 cm (110 in)	270 cm (110 in)	Outside-spiker
4	(France) Anne-Sophie Bauer	7 January 1993 (age 32)	1.78 m (5 ft 10 in)	65 kg (143 lb)	298 cm (117 in)	280 cm (110 in)	Outside-spiker
5	(Ukraine) Yevgeniya Nyukhalova	23 May 1995 (age 30)	1.93 m (6 ft 4 in)	73 kg (161 lb)	285 cm (112 in)	275 cm (108 in)	Opposite
6	(Brazil) Alessandra Guerra	5 April 1981 (age 44)	1.83 m (6 ft 0 in)	70 kg (150 lb)	301 cm (119 in)	288 cm (113 in)	Outside-spiker
7	(Dominican Republic) Niverka Marte	19 October 1990 (age 35)	1.78 m (5 ft 10 in)	67 kg (148 lb)	295 cm (116 in)	283 cm (111 in)	Setter
9	(France) Élisabeth Fedèle	11 January 1994 (age 31)	1.75 m (5 ft 9 in)	62 kg (137 lb)	305 cm (120 in)	290 cm (110 in)	Outside-spiker
10	(France) Estelle Querard	19 March 1979 (age 46)	1.80 m (5 ft 11 in)	69 kg (152 lb)	289 cm (114 in)	280 cm (110 in)	Outside-spiker
11	(Bulgaria) Mira Todorova	12 April 1994 (age 31)	1.87 m (6 ft 2 in)	70 kg (150 lb)	312 cm (123 in)	300 cm (120 in)	Middle-blocker
12	(France) Emeline Roy	11 October 1993 (age 32)	1.65 m (5 ft 5 in)	55 kg (121 lb)	270 cm (110 in)	260 cm (100 in)	Libero
13	(Russia) Anastasia Kornienko	9 September 1992 (age 33)	1.82 m (6 ft 0 in)	71 kg (157 lb)	290 cm (110 in)	278 cm (109 in)	Setter
14	(France) Alexandra Lourenco	12 April 1995 (age 30)	1.72 m (5 ft 8 in)	55 kg (121 lb)	280 cm (110 in)	270 cm (110 in)	Setter
15	(France) Anais Caullet	29 July 1999 (age 26)	1.79 m (5 ft 10 in)	65 kg (143 lb)	289 cm (114 in)	280 cm (110 in)	Middle-blocker
16	(Netherlands) Debby Stam-Pilon	24 July 1984 (age 41)	1.84 m (6 ft 0 in)	68 kg (150 lb)	303 cm (119 in)	281 cm (111 in)	Outside-spiker
18	(Italy) Marina Zambelli	1 January 1990 (age 35)	1.87 m (6 ft 2 in)	67 kg (148 lb)	305 cm (120 in)	290 cm (110 in)	Middle-blocker
20	(Japan) Sayaka Tsutsui	29 September 1992 (age 33)	1.57 m (5 ft 2 in)	51 kg (112 lb)	260 cm (100 in)	250 cm (98 in)	Libero
