= Czech Women's Volleyball Cup =

Volleyball in the Czech Republic

- Sport: Volleyball
- Founded: 1993
- Administrator: ČVS
- Country: Czech Republic
- Continent: Europe
- Most recent champion: VK Dukla Liberec (2nd title)
- Most titles: VK Prostějov (10 titles)
- Website: https://www.cvf.cz/

The Czech Women's Volleyball Cup is organized by the Czech Volleyball Federation (Český volejbalový svaz , ČVS). It was created in 1993 and it is the second most important Women's Volleyball club competition after the Czech Women's Volleyball Extraliga in the Czech Republic.

== Competition Format ==
The competition is played in a knockout format on an autumn–spring schedule. The winners of the quarter-finals advance to the Final Four, where they compete for the Cup. In the 2025/26 Cup final, Šelmy Brno defeated Prostějov 3–2.

== Winners list ==
Years	Winners	Score	Runners-up
1993	TJ KP Brno		SK Slavia Praha
1994	SK UP Mora Olomouc		TJ KP Brno
1995	SK UP Mora Olomouc		SK Královo Pole Brno
1996	PVK Olymp Praha		SK Slavia Praha
1997	PVK Olymp Praha		SK Královo Pole Brno
1998	PVK Olymp Praha		SK Lapos Frenštát pod Radhoštěm
1999	PVK Olymp Praha		SK Lapos Frenštát pod Radhoštěm
2000	PVK Olymp Praha		VK Královo Pole Brno
2001	VK Královo Pole Brno		PVK Olymp Praha
2002	VK Královo Pole Brno		SK Lapos Frenštát pod Radhoštěm
2003	VK Královo Pole Brno		TJ Sokol Frýdek-Místek
2004	PVK Olymp Praha		VK Královo Pole Brno
2005	PVK Olymp Praha		VK Královo Pole Brno
2006	VK Královo Pole Brno	3 - 1 (25-20, 20-25, 25-19, 25-20)	PVK Olymp Praha
2007	PVK Olymp Praha	3 - 0 (25-17, 25-21, 25-23)	VK Královo Pole Brno
2008	VK Prostějov	3 - 0 (25-20, 25-15, 25-13)	PVK Olymp Praha
2009	VK Prostějov	3 - 0 (25-19, 25-14, 25-15)	SK UP Olomouc
2010	VK Modřanská Prostějov	3 - 2 (20-25, 25-22, 25-19, 20-25, 15-9)	VK Královo Pole Brno
2011	VK Modřanská Prostějov	3 - 0 (25-20, 25-15, 25-15)	SK UP Olomouc
2012	VK AGEL Prostějov	3 - 0 (25-21, 25-13, 25-10)	SK UP Olomouc
2013	VK AGEL Prostějov	3 - 1 (25-14, 21-25, 25-19, 25-23)	PVK Olymp Praha
2014	VK AGEL Prostějov	3 - 1 (25-17, 21-25, 27-25, 27-25)	PVK Olymp Praha
2015	VK AGEL Prostějov	3 - 0 (25-21, 25-21, 25-17)	PVK Olymp Praha
2016	VK AGEL Prostějov	3 - 0 (27-25, 25-23, 25-17)	TJ Ostrava
2017	VK UP Olomouc	3 - 2 (25-18, 25-21, 19-25, 20-25, 16-14)	VK AGEL Prostějov
2018	VK AGEL Prostějov	3 - 1 (25-12, 25-18, 20-25, 25-18)	VK UP Olomouc
2019	VK UP Olomouc	3 - 1 (25-21, 25-19, 21-25, 25-17)	VK Prostějov
2020	VK UP Olomouc	3 - 2 (25-27, 17-25, 25-15, 25-20, 15-7)	PVK Olymp Praha
2021	VK UP Olomouc	3 - 1 (21-25, 26-24, 25-20, 25-21)	VK Dukla Liberec
2022	VK Královo Pole Brno		VK Dukla Liberec
2023	VK Královo Pole Brno		TJ Ostrava
2024	VK Dukla Liberec		VK Královo Pole Brno
2025	VK Dukla Liberec		VK Královo Pole Brno

== Honours by club ==
Rk	Club	Titles	City	Years won
1	VK Prostějov	10	Prostějov	(2008–2016), 2018
2	PVK Olymp Praha	8	Prague	(1996–2000), (2004–2005), 2007
3	VK Královo Pole Brno	7	Brno	1993, (2001–2003), 2006, 2022, 2023
4	SK UP Olomouc	6	Olomouc	(1994–1995), 2017, (2019–2021)
