= Marie Kurková =

Czech volleyball player (born 1996)

Personal information
- Nationality: Czech
- Born: 20 May 1996 (age 30); Opava, Czech Republic
- Height: 181 cm (71 in)
- Weight: 75 kg (165 lb)
- Spike: 290 cm (114 in)
- Block: 284 cm (112 in)

Volleyball information
- Current club: University of Nebraska
- Number: 7 (national team)

Career
Years	Teams
2014-2017	PVK Olymp Praha

National team
2014-	Czech Republic

Marie Kurková (born 20 May 1996) is a Czech female volleyball player. She is part of the Czech Republic women's national volleyball team.

She participated in the 2014 FIVB Volleyball World Grand Prix. On club level she played for PVK Olymp Praha in 2014. In 2018 she transferred to college team in Nebraska. With Huskers she ended up as a first runner-up in division 1 volleyball championship, when Nebraska lost against Stanford 2:3.
