= PVK Olymp Praha =

- Full name: Policejní Volejbalový Klub Olymp Praha
- Founded: 1953
- Chairman: Vladimír Pirunčík
- Head coach: Stanislav Mitáč
- League: Czech Women's Volleyball Extraliga
- 2016–17: 4th (Playoff quarterfinalists)
- Website: Club home page

Policejní Volejbalový Klub Olymp Praha (English: Police Volleyball Club Olymp Prague) is a professional Czech women's volleyball club (until 1993 it also had a men's team) based in Prague and currently playing in the Czech Women's Volleyball Extraliga, the highest Czech league. During the Czechoslovakia era, the club was called Rudá Hvězda Praha (English: Red Star Prague) and had its most successful period.

== Previous names ==
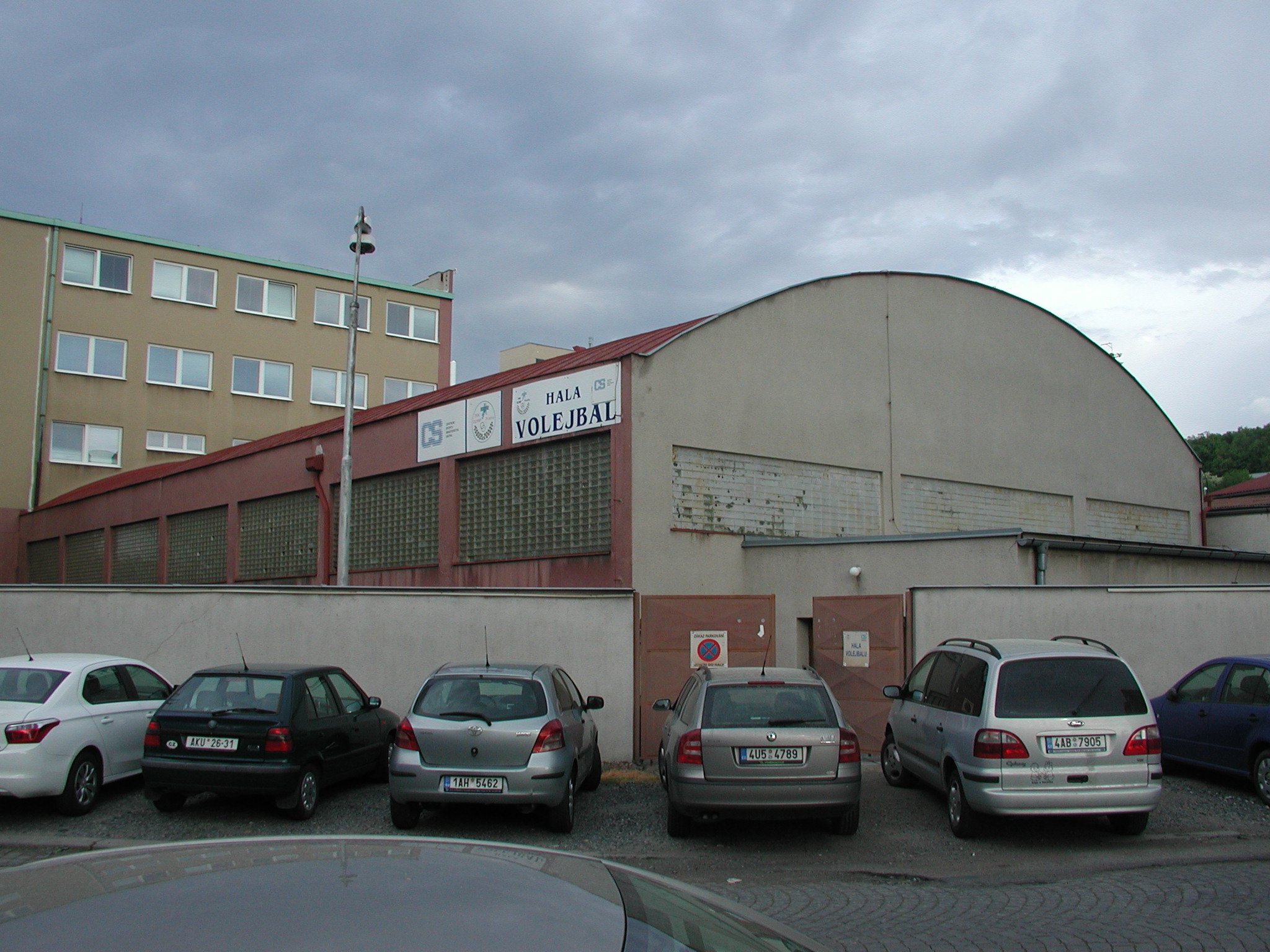
Training hall

The club have competed under the following names:

- Rudá Hvězda Praha (1953–1990)
- PSK Olymp Praha (1990–1994)
- PVK Olymp Praha (1994–present)

== History ==
=== Background ===
Following the end of the Second World War in 1945, the Czechoslovakia military corps begin forming sports teams to keep the physical fitness of soldiers and soon regional and national competitions for these teams were created. In 1948 most sports were banned from being professional in the country, in that same year the army formed a club called Armádní tělovýchovný klub (ATK) Praha and by 1953 a law (following the Soviet model) determined that all clubs should be voluntary sports societies (Czech: Dobrovolná sportovní organizace or DSO), with athletes being allocated to clubs according to their civic occupation. In that same year, ATK Praha becomes a DSO called Ústřední dům armády (ÚDA) Praha and the national security corps (until then part of the ATK Praha) formed a new DSO called Rudá Hvězda (RH) Praha.

=== Czechoslovak years ===
Originally, Rudá Hvězda had only a men's team which started competing in the local competition, progressing to the regional and arriving at the national competition in 1956. The men's team would remain in the highest national level until it was dissolved in 1993, with its most successful period happening between 1970 and 1990, having won the national championship nine times. The men's team also participated in European competitions, winning the 1977–78 Cup Winners Cup and finishing the CEV Champions League in the top four positions on three occasions (third in 1972–73 and fourth in both 1984–85 and 1985–86).

The women's team came to notoriety in the 1960s, arriving at the highest national level in 1969. The first titles came in 1973–74 (Czechoslovak championship and cup) with more success following in the 1970s and 1980s. The team also achieved international success by winning the CEV Women's Champions League twice (1975–76 and 1979–80) and reaching the Women's Cup Winners Cup final three times, winning in 1978–79 and finishing second in 1973–74 and 1982–83.

As a result of the fall of Real socialism in the Eastern Bloc countries, the club changed its name to Policejní sportovní klub (PSK) Olymp Praha in 1990. By the time the Czechoslovak championships came to an end, in 1992, the club had won a total of 21 national championship titles (12 women's and 9 men's).

=== Czech Republic years ===
After the dissolution of Czechoslovakia and the creation of the new Czech league in 1993, Olymp Praha decided to focus only on women's volleyball, changing from sports club (PSK) to volleyball club (Policejní volejbalový klub or PVK) in 1994. The club proved to be competitive in the league, having never been relegated (since 1969) and despite not being as dominant as during the Czechoslovak days, it achieved some degree of success, winning the league on four occasions and the cup eight times.

== Honours ==
=== Men ===
National competitions

- Czechoslovak Championship: 9

1965–66, 1971–72, 1981–82, 1983–84, 1984–85, 1985–86, 1988–89, 1990–91, 1991–92

International competitions

- CEV Cup: 1

1977–78

=== Women ===
National competitions

- Czechoslovak Championship: 12

1973–74, 1974–75, 1976–77, 1978–79, 1979–80, 1980–81, 1983–84, 1984–85, 1985–86, 1986–87, 1987–88, 1991–92

- Czechoslovak Cup: 7

1973–74, 1975–76, 1976–77, 1977–78, 1978–79, 1979–80, 1981–82

- Czech League: 4

1996–97, 1998–99, 2004–05, 2007–08

- Czech Cup: 8

1995–96, 1996–97, 1997–98, 1998–99, 1999–00, 2003–04, 2004–05, 2006–07

International competitions

- CEV Champions League: 2

1975–76, 1979–80

- CEV Cup: 1

1978–79

== Team ==
Season 2017–2018, as of December 2017.

Number	Player	Position	Height (m)	Weight (kg)	Birth date
2	(Czech Republic) Lucie Kalhousová	Outside hitter	1.85	76	14 May 1996 (age 29)
3	(Czech Republic) Klára Melicharová	Outside hitter	1.83	80	24 May 1994 (age 31)
4	(Czech Republic) Anna Šotkovská	Outside hitter			18 April 1997 (age 28)
5	(Czech Republic) Adéla Stavinohová	Libero	1.73	70	19 May 1998 (age 27)
6	(Czech Republic) Gabriela Bartošová	Middle blocker	1.78	67	21 September 1996 (age 28)
7	(Czech Republic) Simona Kopecká	Setter	1.71	67	28 November 1993 (age 31)
8	(Czech Republic) Pavlína Šimáňová	Middle blocker	1.86	80	5 April 1996 (age 29)
9	(Czech Republic) Anna Komárková	Outside hitter	1.77	70	20 February 1996 (age 29)
10	(Czech Republic) Marie Kurková	Setter	1.79	79	20 May 1996 (age 29)
12	(Czech Republic) Daniela Černá	Outside hitter	1.84	72	12 September 1998 (age 26)
14	(Czech Republic) Veronika Pešková	Libero	1.65	53	24 July 1994 (age 30)
15	(Czech Republic) Nikola Bartecká	Middle blocker	1.85	72	12 March 2000 (age 25)
16	(Czech Republic) Klára Fomenková	Outside hitter	1.81	66	30 March 2001 (age 24)
	(Czech Republic) Simona Šnajdrová	Middle blocker	1.83	63	6 February 2000 (age 25)
