= Hristina Ruseva =

Bulgarian volleyball player (born 1991)

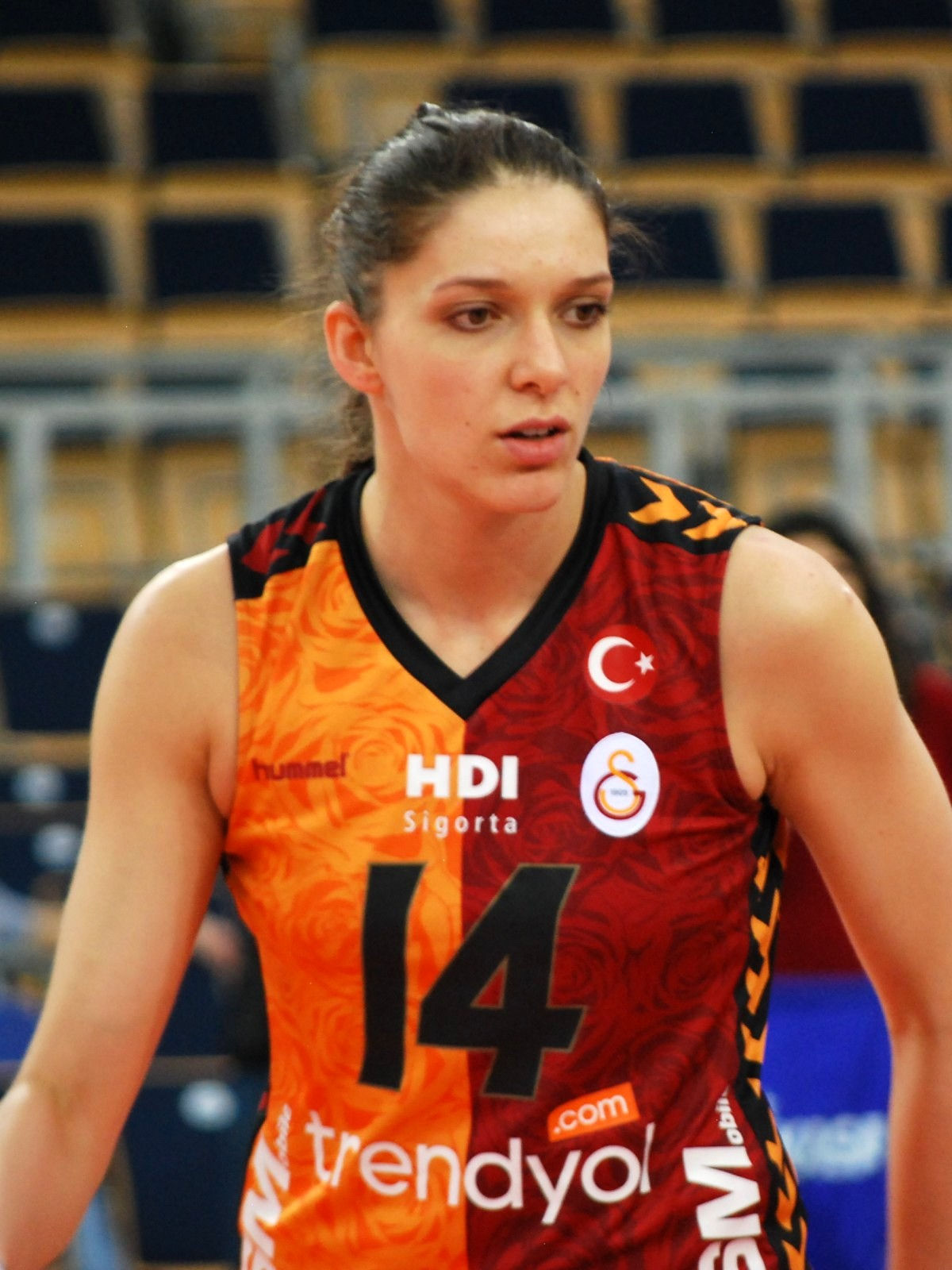
- Ruseva in 2017

Personal information
- Full name: Hristina Ruseva
- Nationality: Bulgarian
- Born: 1 October 1991 (age 35); Sofia, Bulgaria
- Height: 1.92 m (6 ft 4 in)
- Weight: 75 kg (165 lb)

Volleyball information
- Position: Middle blocker
- Current club: Fenerbahçe
- Number: 11

National team
Bulgaria

Hristina Ruseva (Bulgarian Cyrillic: Христина Русева; born 1 October 1991) is a Bulgarian volleyball player. She currently plays for Fenerbahçe and Bulgaria and Omaha Supernovas.

== Career ==
She competed at the 2011 Women's European Volleyball League, 2011 Women's European Volleyball Championship, 2013 Women's European Volleyball Championship, 2013 FIVB World Grand Prix, 2014 FIVB World Grand Prix, 2014 FIVB Volleyball Women's World Championship, 2015 European Games, 2015 Women's European Volleyball Championship, 2015 FIVB World Grand Prix, 2015–16 CEV Women's Champions League, 2017 Women's European Volleyball Championship, 2017 FIVB Volleyball World Grand Prix, 2018 Women's European Volleyball League, 2018 FIVB Volleyball Women's World Championship, 2018 FIVB Volleyball Women's Challenger Cup, 2021 Women's European Volleyball Championship, and 2023–24 CEV Women's Champions League.

At the club level. she played for CSKA Sofia, Türk Hava Yolları, Galatasaray, and Prosecco DOC Imoco Conegliano as middle blocker.

== Awards ==
=== Clubs ===
- 2009-10 Bulgarian League - Champions, with CSKA Sofia
- 2010-11 Bulgarian Cup - Champions, with CSKA Sofia
- 2010-11 Bulgarian League - Champions, with CSKA Sofia
- 2019-20 Bulgarian League - Champions, with Maritsa Plovdiv
- 2021 Italian Supercup - Champions, with Imoco Volley Conegliano
- 2021-22 Italian Cup (Coppa Italia) - Champion, with Imoco Volley Conegliano
- 2021–22 Italian League - Champion, with Imoco Volley Conegliano
- 2024 Turkish Super Cup – Champion, with Fenerbahçe Medicana
- 2024–25 Turkish Cup – Champion, with Fenerbahçe Medicana
