= Laura Weihenmaier =

German volleyball player (born 1991)

Laura Emonts
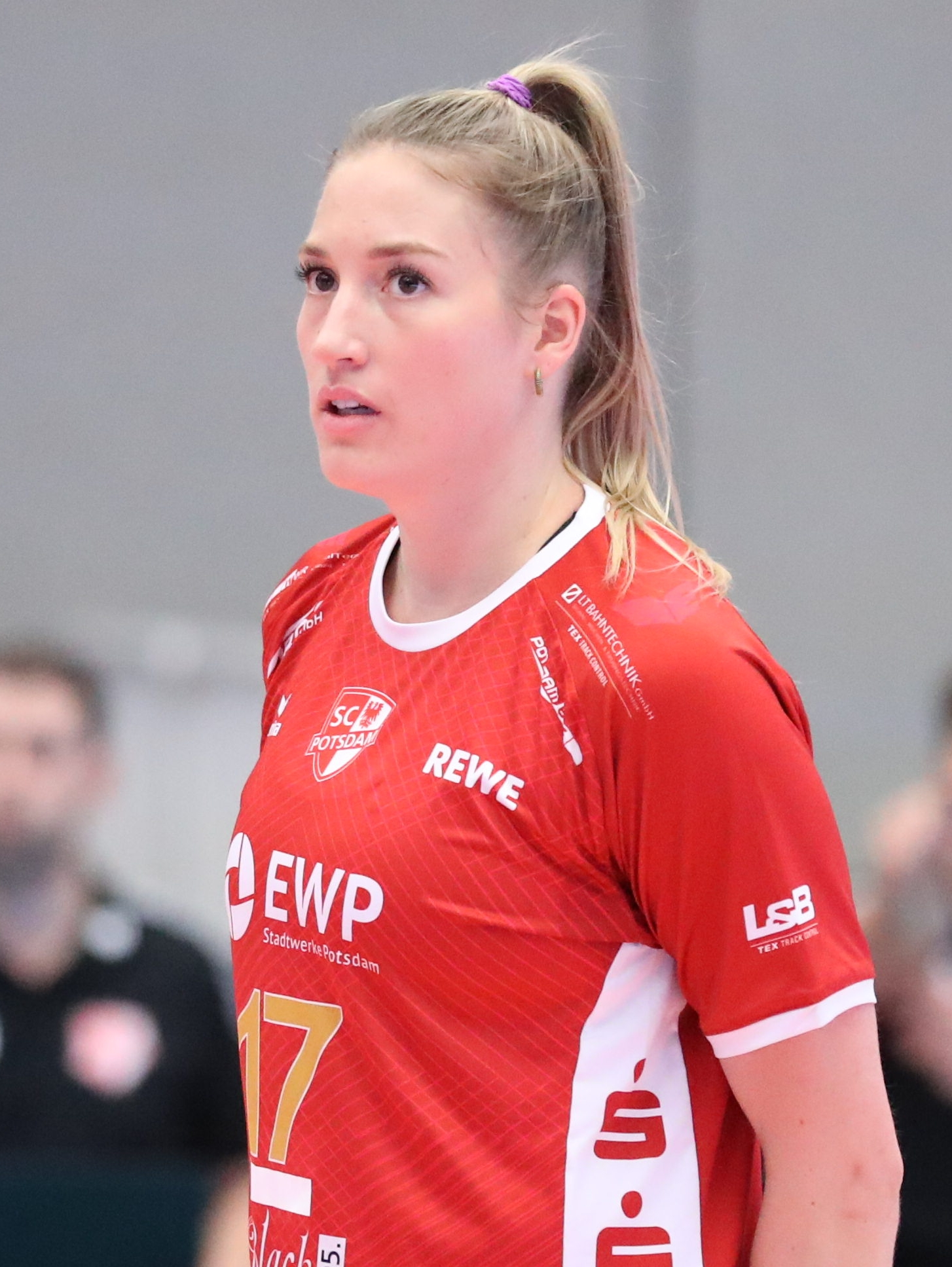

Personal information
- Full name: Laura Weihenmaier-Emonts
- Nationality: Germany
- Born: 4 April 1991 (age 35); Tuttlingen, Germany
- Height: 1.80 m (5 ft 11 in)
- Weight: 70 kg (154 lb)
- Spike: 297 cm (117 in)
- Block: 286 cm (113 in)

Volleyball information
- Number: 19

Career
Years	Teams
2000–2005; 2005–2007; 2007–2009; 2009–2012; 2012–2014; 2014–2015; 2015–2016; 2016; 2015–2018; 2018–2019	(Germany) TG Tuttlingen (Germany) TV Villingen (Germany) VC Olympia Berlin (Germany) SC Potsdam (Germany) Ladies in Black Aachen (Germany) Schweriner SC (Germany) Ladies in Black Aachen (Germany) NawaRo Straubing (Czech Republic) VK Prostějov (Greece) Olympiacos Piraeus

Laura Emonts, née Weihenmaier (born 4 April 1991) is a German volleyball player. She is a member of the Germany women's national volleyball team. She was part of the German national team at the 2014 FIVB Volleyball Women's World Championship in Italy.

== Sporting achievements ==
=== National team ===
- 2009 Women's U20 World Championship (Tijuana & Mexicali, Mexico)
- 2014 Women's European League
- 2015 5th place Women's European Championship

=== Clubs ===
==== National championships ====
- 2014/2015 German Championship, with Schweriner SC
- 2016/2017 Czech Championship, with VK Prostějov
- 2017/2018 Czech Championship, with VK Prostějov
- 2018/2019 Hellenic Championship, with Olympiacos Piraeus

==== National cups ====
- 2016/2017 Czech Cup, with VK Prostějov
- 2017/2018 Czech Cup, with VK Prostějov
- 2018/2019 Hellenic Cup, with Olympiacos Piraeus

=== Individuals ===
- 2016-17 Czech Championship M.V.P., with VK Prostějov
