= VK Prostějov =

Czech volleyball club

- Full name: Volejbalový Klub Prostějov
- Founded: 2007
- Ground: Národní sportovní centrum Prostějov, Za Velodromem 7, Prostějov, Czech Republic, 796 01 (Capacity: 500)
- Chairman: Petr Chytil
- Head coach: Petr Zapletal
- League: Czech Women's Volleyball Extraliga
- 2024–25: 1st
- Website: Club home page

Uniforms
Home	Away

VK Prostějov is a Czech women's volleyball club based in Prostějov. The club competes in the Czech Women's Volleyball Extraliga, the highest Czech league.

== Previous names ==
Due to sponsorship, the club have competed under the following names:

- VK Prostějov (2007–2009)
- VK Modranská Prostějov (2009–2010)
- VK Prostějov (2010–2011)
- VK Agel Prostějov (2011–2017)
- VK Prostějov (2017–present)

== History ==
The club was founded in 2007, when TK Plus decided to create a top class women's volleyball team in Prostějov. After agreements with TJ OP Prostějov and Moravská Slavia Brno, the club was able to compete in the 2007–08 season of the Extraliga (highest national league). The club plays its home matches at the 500 capacity Národní sportovní centrum Prostějov.

== Honours ==
=== National competitions ===
- Czech Championship: 12

2008–09, 2009–10, 2010–11, 2011–12, 2012–13, 2013–14, 2014–15, 2015–16, 2016–17,2017–18, 2021–22, 2024–25

- Czech Cup: 10

2007–08, 2008–09, 2009–10, 2010–11, 2011–12, 2012–13, 2013–14, 2014–15, 2015–16, 2017–18

=== International competitions ===
- MEVZA Cup: 1

2010–11

== Team ==
Season 2017–2018, as of December 2017.

Number	Player	Position	Height (m)	Weight (kg)	Birth date
1	(Czech Republic) Andrea Kossányiová	Outside hitter	1.85	72	6 August 1993 (age 32)
2	(Czech Republic) Helena Horká	Opposite	1.90	73	15 June 1981 (age 44)
3	(Czech Republic) Veronika Trnková	Middle blocker	1.88	86	13 October 1995 (age 30)
4	(Czech Republic) Sarah Cruz	Opposite	1.84	69	8 March 1998 (age 27)
6	(Germany) Kathleen Weiß	Setter	1.71	64	2 February 1984 (age 41)
8	(Slovakia) Gabriela Kozmík Tomášeková	Middle blocker	1.85	68	20 September 1983 (age 42)
9	(Slovakia) Nina Herelová	Middle blocker	1.82	69	30 July 1993 (age 32)
10	(Czech Republic) Tereza Slavíková	Libero	1.70	66	5 August 1998 (age 27)
12	(Czech Republic) Julie Kovářová	Libero	1.79	62	14 September 1987 (age 38)
13	(Czech Republic) Lucie Nová	Outside hitter	1.84	68	3 May 1996 (age 29)
16	(Czech Republic) Michaela Zatloukalová	Setter	1.80	74	16 April 1995 (age 30)
17	(Germany) Laura Emonts	Outside hitter	1.80	71	4 April 1991 (age 34)
	(Czech Republic) Klára Dvořáčková	Setter	1.80	66	1 July 2000 (age 25)
	(Czech Republic) Aneta Weidenthalerová	Outside hitter	1.78	65	22 January 1999 (age 27)

2016–2017 Team
Number	Player	Position	Height (m)	Weight (kg)	Birth date
1	(Cuba) Heidy Rodríguez	Opposite	1.90	70	24 June 1993 (age 32)
2	(Czech Republic) Barbora Gambová	Outside hitter	1.77	70	7 March 1992 (age 33)
3	(Czech Republic) Veronika Trnková	Middle blocker	1.87	88	13 October 1995 (age 30)
7	(Czech Republic) Veronika Tinklová	Setter	1.77	60	14 October 1986 (age 39)
9	(Slovakia) Nina Herelová	Middle blocker	1.82	65	30 July 1993 (age 32)
10	(Turkey) Yeliz Başa	Opposite	1.88	75	13 August 1987 (age 38)
11	(Italy) Laura Frigo	Middle blocker	1.85	72	26 October 1990 (age 35)
12	(Czech Republic) Julie Kovářová	Libero	1.79	62	14 September 1987 (age 38)
13	(Czech Republic) Lucie Nova	Outside hitter	1.86	70	3 May 1996 (age 29)
14	(Germany) Mareike Hindriksen	Setter	1.82	60	14 November 1987 (age 38)
17	(Germany) Laura Emonts	Outside hitter	1.80	70	4 April 1991 (age 34)
18	(Cuba) Sulian Matienzo	Outside hitter	1.82	67	14 December 1994 (age 31)
	(Czech Republic) Sarah Cruz	Outside hitter	1.83	65	8 March 1998 (age 27)
	(Czech Republic) Tereza Slavíková	Libero	1.68	60	5 August 1998 (age 27)
	(Czech Republic) Vendula Valášková	Outside hitter	1.84	70	10 February 1998 (age 27)

2015–2016 Team
Number	Player	Position	Height (m)	Birth date
1	(Croatia) Mira Topić	Outside spiker	1.86	02/06/1993
2	(Czech Republic) Barbora Gambová	Outside spiker	1.78	07/03/1992
4	(Cuba) Melissa Vargas	Outside spiker	1.91	16/10/1999
5	(Germany) Kathleen Weiß	Setter	1.77	02/02/1984
6	(Slovakia) Nina Herelová	Middle blocker	1.85	30/07/1993
7	(Netherlands) Quinta Steenbergen	Middle blocker	1.87	02/04/1985
9	(Slovenia) Sonja Borovinšek	Middle blocker	1.87	04/07/1980
10	(Slovakia) Solange Soares	Opposite	1.81	01/07/1980
11	(Cuba) Leanny Castañeda	Opposite	1.86	18/10/1986
12	(Czech Republic) Julie Kovářová	Libero	1.79	14/09/1987
14	(Czech Republic) Kristyna Adamciková	Outside spiker	1.83	02/07/1997
15	(Belarus) Tatsiana Markevich	Outside spiker	1.84	25/03/1988
16	(Czech Republic) Veronika Tinklová	Setter	1.81	14/10/1986
18	(Cuba) Sulian Matienzo	Outside spiker	1.78	14/12/1994
	(Czech Republic) Aneta Chludova	Middle blocker	1.80	01/11/1996
	(Czech Republic) Sarah Cruz	Outside spiker	1.83	08/03/1998
	(Czech Republic) Lucie Zatloukalová	Setter	1.77	11/08/1997

=== Notable players ===
- (Turkey) Melisa Vargas
