= Barbora Gambová =

Czech volleyball player (born 1992)

Personal information
- Nationality: Czech
- Born: 7 March 1992 (age 34)
- Height: 177 cm (5 ft 10 in)
- Weight: 77 kg (170 lb)
- Spike: 302 cm (119 in)
- Block: 288 cm (113 in)

Volleyball information
- Number: 23 (national team)

Career
Years	Teams
2015	VK Prostějov

National team
2015	Czech Republic

Barbora Gambová (born 7 March 1992) is a Czech female volleyball player. She is part of the Czech Republic women's national volleyball team.

She participated in the 2015 FIVB Volleyball World Grand Prix. On club level she played for VK Prostějov in 2015.
