= Kathleen Weiß =

German volleyball player (born 1984)

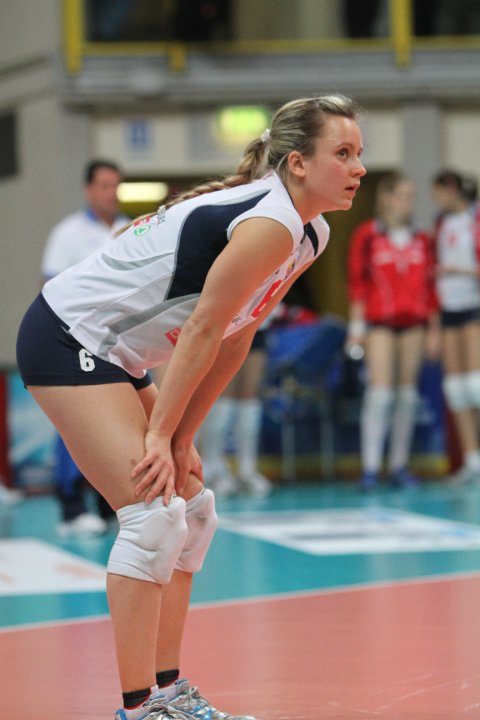

Personal information
- Nationality: German
- Born: 2 February 1984 (age 42); Schwerin, Mecklenburg-Vorpommern, East Germany
- Height: 1.71 m (5 ft 7 in)
- Weight: 66 kg (146 lb)
- Spike: 290 cm (110 in)
- Block: 273 cm (107 in)

Volleyball information
- Position: Setter
- Current club: VK Agel Prostějov
- Number: 2 (national team)

Career
Years	Teams
1993–2001	Schweriner SC
2001–2003	VC Parchim
2003–2008	Schweriner SC
2008–2009	Martinus Amstelveen
2009–2010	Sirio Perugia
2010–2011	Igtisadchi Baku
2011–2012	Spes Volley Conegliano
2012–2012	Chieri Volley
2012–2014	Volley Bergamo
2014–2016	VK Prostějov
2016–2017	MKS Dąbrowa Górnicza
2017–	VK Prostějov

National team
2003–	Germany
Honours
Women's volleyball
Representing Germany
European Championship
Silver medal – second place	2011 Italy/Serbia	Team
Silver medal – second place	2013 Switzerland/Germany	Team
FIVB Grand Prix
Bronze medal – third place	2009 Tokyo	Team
- Last updated: 27 September 2017

Kathleen Weiß (born 2 February 1984) is a German volleyball player. She plays as setter and has over 300 appearances for the Germany women's national volleyball team. At club level she plays for Czech VK Agel Prostějov. Weiß has played in many international competitions (FIVB World Championships, FIVB World Cup, FIVB World Grand Prix, European Championships, European Leagues, European Games) and won various national championships and cups with the clubs she played for.

== Career ==
Born in Schwerin, Weiß began playing volleyball at the age of eight when her mother, who was a volleyball player, made a training group teaching techniques and tricks. She then joining her town's club Schweriner SC in 1993, where she progressed through the youth team system until reaching the first team and becoming professional. In 2000, she was combining her studies with volleyball training while trying to break into the first team. She then played for 2 Bundesliga club VC Parchim from 2001 to 2003, gaining more playing opportunities and experience.

She also became involved in the Germany women's national volleyball team as a teenager, firstly in the youth national teams, appearing at youth and junior international competitions from 2001 until 2003, winning the gold medal at the 2001 European Youth Olympics during that period. On 10 March 2003, she made her debut for the senior team in a match against Russia which ended with Germany losing by 2–3. Due to her height (1.71 metres), she was used as a libero by then national team coach Hee Wan-Lee.

Her return to Schweriner SC in 2003 and the appointment of Giovanni Guidetti as the national team head coach in 2006, who decided to use her as a setter (her original position), provided Weiß with opportunities and her performances started to improve. In 2005–06, she won the German Bundesliga (championship) and Cup. In the following season she finished third at the 2006–07 CEV Top Teams Cup, won the German Cup again and despite missing on the championship, was elected the best setter of the Bundesliga. Her performances at the 2006 FIVB Volleyball Women's World Championship were praised by Guidetti, who recognized her improvement. In August 2008, she decided to look for new challenges and leave Schweriner SC.

In September 2008, she moved to the Netherlands to play for DELA Martinus, to improve further her development under head coach Avital Selinger a former experienced Dutch international player. Her only season in the Dutch club yielded a Dutch Championship, Cup and Super Cup titles.

With the national team she won a bronze medal at the 2009 World Grand Prix before joining Italian Serie A1 club Despar Perugia on 16 September 2009. Later that year she finish fourth with the national team in the 2009 European Championship, after losing the hosts Poland in the bronze medal match.

Ahead of the 2010–11 season she moved to Igtisadchi Baku of the Azerbaijani Super League. The club reached the semifinals of the 2010–11 CEV Women's Challenge Cup, missing a place in the final by losing to Lokomotiv Baku in the golden set.

She returned to Italy in July 2011, when she joined Serie A1 club Spes Conegliano. A few months later she won a silver medal with the national team at the 2011 European Championship. Due to financial issues, Spes Conegliano was forced to withdraw from the league and the club closed down in December 2011. Wishing to remain in Italy, she joined Chieri Torino mid-season in January 2012.

Remaining in the Italian Serie A1, she switched clubs, joining Foppapedretti Bergamo for the 2012–13 season. With the national team she won the 2013 European Volleyball League and finish second at the 2013 European Championship. After her first season at Bergamo, a renewed contract is agreed with the club for another season. She was runner up of the 2013–14 Italian Cup after losing the final with Bergamo to Rebecchi Nordmeccanica Piacenza.

Serving the national team in the summer of 2014, she won the 2014 Montreux Volley Masters and was second at the 2014 European League.

In October 2014, she joined AGEL Prostějov of the Czech Extraliga. She won the Czech Cup and Championship in the 2014–15 season, and after playing a key role during the season, with the club going undefeated in both national competitions, she agreed to a new contract with the club. With the national team, she reached the quarterfinals of the 2015 European Games in Baku. On 18 July 2015, she made her 300th appearance for the German national team in a 3–1 win against Serbia at the 2015 World Grand Prix. In her second season with AGEL Prostějov, she won the double (Czech championship and cup) for a second time in a row.

In October 2016, she signed with MKS Dąbrowa Górnicza, a club of the Polish Orlen Liga. Her season in Poland yielded a 5th place in the League, a cup quarterfinals and group stage matches at the 2016–17 CEV Women's Champions League.

On 16 June 2017, AGEL Prostějov announced Weiß return to the club for the 2017–18 season.

== Personal life ==
She is the daughter of Gerald Weiß and Petra Weiß. Both were athletes at SC Traktor Schwerin, her father a javelin thrower and her mother a volleyball player.

== Clubs ==
- (Germany) Schweriner SC (1993–2001)
- (Germany) VC Parchim (2001–2003)
- (Germany) Schweriner SC (2003–2008)
- (Netherlands) DELA Martinus Amstelveen (2008–2009)
- (Italy) Despar Perugia (2009–2010)
- (Azerbaijan) İqtisadçı Bakı (2010–2011)
- (Italy) Spes Conegliano (2011–2012)
- (Italy) Chieri Torino Volley Club (Jan 2012–May 2012)
- (Italy) Foppapedretti Bergamo (2012–2014)
- (Czech Republic) AGEL Prostějov (2014–2016)
- (Poland) MKS Dąbrowa Górnicza (2016–2017)
- (Czech Republic) AGEL Prostějov (2017–present)

== Awards ==
=== Individual ===
- 2006–07 German Championship "Best Setter"

=== National team results ===
==== Junior ====
- 2001 Girls' Youth European Volleyball Championship — 4th place
- 2001 European Youth Summer Olympic Festival — Gold medal
- 2002 Women's Junior European Volleyball Championship — 8th place
- 2003 FIVB Volleyball Women's U20 World Championship — 5th place

==== Senior ====
- 2003 FIVB Volleyball World Grand Prix — 7th place
- 2004 Montreux Volley Masters — 5th place
- 2004 FIVB Volleyball World Grand Prix — 6th place
- 2005 FIVB Volleyball World Grand Prix — 10th place
- 2006 Montreux Volley Masters — 5th place
- 2006 FIVB Volleyball Women's World Championship — 11th place
- 2007 Montreux Volley Masters — 5th place
- 2007 Women's European Volleyball Championship — 6th place
- 2009 Montreux Volley Masters — 6th place
- 2009 FIVB Volleyball World Grand Prix — Bronze medal
- 2009 Women's European Volleyball Championship — 4th place
- 2010 Montreux Volley Masters — 7th place
- 2010 FIVB Volleyball World Grand Prix — 9th place
- 2010 FIVB Volleyball Women's World Championship — 7th place
- 2011 Montreux Volley Masters — 6th place
- 2011 FIVB Volleyball World Grand Prix — 13th place
- 2011 Women's European Volleyball Championship — Silver medal
- 2011 FIVB Volleyball Women's World Cup — 6th place
- 2012 FIVB Volleyball World Grand Prix — 7th place
- 2013 Women's European Volleyball League — Gold medal
- 2013 FIVB Volleyball World Grand Prix — 11th place
- 2013 Women's European Volleyball Championship — Silver medal
- 2014 Montreux Volley Masters — Gold medal
- 2014 Women's European Volleyball League — Silver medal
- 2014 FIVB Volleyball World Grand Prix — 10th place
- 2014 FIVB Volleyball Women's World Championship — 9th place
- 2015 European Games — 5th place
- 2015 FIVB Volleyball World Grand Prix — 7th
- 2015 Women's European Volleyball Championship — 5th place

=== Club honours ===
- 2005–06 German Championship — Gold medal (with Schweriner SC)
- 2005–06 German Cup — Gold medal (with Schweriner SC)
- 2006–07 CEV Top Teams Cup — Bronze medal (with Schweriner SC)
- 2006–07 German Championship — Silver medal (with Schweriner SC)
- 2006–07 German Cup — Gold medal (with Schweriner SC)
- 2007–08 German Championship — Bronze medal (with Schweriner SC)
- 2008–09 Dutch Championship — Gold medal (with DELA Martinus)
- 2008–09 Dutch Cup — Gold medal (with DELA Martinus)
- 2008–09 Dutch Super Cup — Gold medal (with DELA Martinus)
- 2010–11 Azerbaijani Championship — Bronze medal (with Igtisadchi Baku)
- 2013–14 Italian Cup — Silver medal (with Foppapedretti Bergamo)
- 2014–15 Czech Championship — Gold medal (with AGEL Prostějov)
- 2014–15 Czech Cup — Gold medal (with AGEL Prostějov)
- 2015–16 Czech Championship — Gold medal (with AGEL Prostějov)
- 2015–16 Czech Cup — Gold medal (with AGEL Prostějov)
