= Czech Women's Volleyball Extraliga =

Premier women's volleyball league in the Czech Republic

Extraliga žen
- Current season, competition or edition: 2025–26 Volleyball Extraliga žen
- Sport: Volleyball
- Founded: 1992
- First season: 1992
- Administrator: ČVS
- No. of teams: 10 (2019–20)
- Country: Czech Republic
- Continent: Europe
- Most recent champion: VK Prostějov (12th title)
- Most titles: VK Prostějov (12 titles)
- Level on pyramid: 1
- Relegation to: 2nd League
- Domestic cups: Czech Cup; Czech Super Cup
- International cups: CEV Champions League; CEV Cup; CEV Challenge Cup
- Website: https://www.cvf.cz/

The Czech Women's Volleyball Extraliga or in (Czech Česká volejbalová extraliga žen) is a women's volleyball competition organized by the Czech Volleyball Association (Český volejbalový svaz, ČVS). It was created in 1992, just after the dissolution of Czechoslovakia.

== Name History ==
Extraliga logo from 2010 to 2025

The Championship currently funded by the Czech electronics retailer Datart and is officially known as Datart Extraliga ženy.

- Extraliga žen (1992–2005)
- ArginMax Extraliga žen (2005–2007)
- Extraliga žen (2007–2010)
- UNIQA Extraliga žen (2010–2025)
- Datart Extraliga ženy (2025–...)

== List of Champions ==
Years	(gold) Gold	(silver) Silver	(bronze) Bronze
1993	SK UP Olomouc	PVK Olymp Praha	VK Královo Pole Brno
1994	SK UP Mora Olomouc	VK Královo Pole Brno	
1995	SK UP Mora Olomouc	PVK Olymp Praha	VK Královo Pole Brno
1996	SK UP Mora Olomouc	PVK Olymp Praha	VK Královo Pole Brno
1997	PVK Olymp Praha	SK Frenštát pod Radhoštěm	VK Královo Pole Brno
1998	SK Lapos Frenštát pod Radhoštěm	PVK Olymp Praha	VK Královo Pole Brno
1999	PVK Olymp Praha	SK Lapos Frenštát pod Radhoštěm	SK UP Olomouc
2000	SK Lapos Frenštát pod Radhoštěm	VK Královo Pole Brno	
2001	SK Radegast Lapos Frenštát pod Radhoštěm	VK Královo Pole Brno	
2002	VK Královo Pole Brno	PVK Olymp Praha	SK Lapos Frenštát pod Radhoštěm
2003	VK Královo Pole Brno	PVK Olymp Praha	SK UP Olomouc
2004	VK Královo Pole Brno	PVK Olymp Praha	TJ Sokol Frýdek-Místek
2005	PVK Olymp Praha	TJ Sokol Frýdek-Místek	VK Královo Pole Brno
2006	VK Královo Pole Brno	SK Slavia Praha	PVK Olymp Praha
2007	VK Královo Pole Brno	PVK Olymp Praha	SK Slavia Praha
2008	PVK Olymp Praha	SK UP Olomouc	VK Královo Pole Brno
2009	VK Prostějov	VK Královo Pole Brno	SK UP Olomouc
2010	VK Modřanská Prostějov	VK Královo Pole Brno	PVK Olymp Praha
2011	VK Modřanská Prostějov	SK UP Olomouc	VK Královo Pole Brno
2012	VK AGEL Prostějov	PVK Olymp Praha	SK UP Olomouc
2013	VK AGEL Prostějov	PVK Olymp Praha	SK UP Olomouc
2014	VK AGEL Prostějov	PVK Olymp Praha	SK UP Olomouc
2015	VK AGEL Prostějov	PVK Olymp Praha	TJ Sokol Frýdek-Místek
2016	VK AGEL Prostějov	VK UP Olomouc	TJ Ostrava
2017	VK AGEL Prostějov	VK UP Olomouc	VK Královo Pole Brno
2018	VK AGEL Prostějov	VK UP Olomouc	TJ Ostrava
2019	VK UP Olomouc	VK Prostějov	VK Dukla Liberec
2020	The League Has stopped due to coronavirus spread.		
2021	VK Dukla Liberec	PVK Olymp Praha	VK UP Olomouc
2022	VK Prostějov	VK Královo Pole Brno	VK Dukla Liberec
2023	VK Královo Pole Brno	VK Šelmy Brno	VK Dukla Liberec
2024	VK Šelmy Brno	VK Dukla Liberec	VK Prostějov
2025	VK Prostějov	VK UP Olomouc	VK Dukla Liberec

== Table by clubs ==
Rk	Club	Titles	City	Years Won
1	VK Prostějov	12	Prostějov	(2009—2018), 2022, 2025
2	VK Královo Pole Brno	6	Brno	(2002—2004), (2006—2007), 2023
3	SK UP Olomouc	5	Olomouc	(1993—1996), 2019
4	PVK Olymp Praha	4	Prague	1997, 1999, 2005, 2008
5	SK Frenštát pod Radhoštěm	3	Frenštát pod Radhoštěm	1998, (2000—2001)
