= 2016–17 CEV Women's Champions League qualification =

This article shows the qualification phase for 2017 CEV Women's Champions League. A total of 18 teams enter qualification round. During qualification, the winners keep on progressing until the last 4 teams standing join the 12 teams which have directly qualified to the main tournament League round based on the European Cups' Ranking List. All 14 teams which do not progress in qualification are allocated to different stages of the 2017 Women's CEV Cup.

== Participating teams ==
- (Czech Republic) Agel Prostějov
- (Slovenia) Calcit Ljubljana
- (Russia) Dinamo Krasnodar
- (Turkey) Eczacibasi VitrA Istanbul
- (Finland) HPK Hämeenlinna
- (Ukraine) Khimik Yuzhny
- (Estonia) Kohila VC
- (Kosovo) KV Drita Gjilan
- (Hungary) Linamar - Békéscsabai RSE
- (Italy) Liu Jo Nordmeccanica Modena
- (Montenegro) Luka Bar
- (Israel) Maccabi Haifa
- (Bulgaria) Maritza Plovdiv
- (Belarus) Minchanka Minsk
- (Poland) MKS Dąbrowa Górnicza
- (France) RC Cannes
- (Serbia) Vizura Beograd
- (Bosnia and Herzegovina) ŽOK Bimal-Jedinstvo Brčko

== First round ==
- Home-Away matches.
- Winners advances to the Second round. Losers will compete in 32nd Finals of 2017 Women's CEV Cup.
- All times are local.

Team 1	Agg.	Team 2	1st leg	2nd leg
KV Drita Gjilan (Kosovo)	0–6	(Bulgaria) Maritza Plovdiv	0–3	0–3
Kohila VC (Estonia)	5–1	(Montenegro) Luka Bar	3–1	3–2

=== First leg ===
Date	Time		Score		Set 1	Set 2	Set 3	Set 4	Set 5	Total	Report
18 Oct	19:00	KV Drita Gjilan (Kosovo)	0–3	(Bulgaria) Maritza Plovdiv	13–25	11–25	15–25			39–75	Report
18 Oct	18:00	Kohila VC (Estonia)	3–1	(Montenegro) Luka Bar	25–15	22–25	25–13	25–21		97–74	Report

=== Second leg ===
Date	Time		Score		Set 1	Set 2	Set 3	Set 4	Set 5	Total	Report
22 Oct	18:00	Maritza Plovdiv (Bulgaria)	3–0	(Kosovo) KV Drita Gjilan	25–13	25–18	25–15			75–46	Report
22 Oct	17:00	Luka Bar (Montenegro)	2–3	(Estonia) Kohila VC	25–18	19–25	25–18	22–25	13–15	104–101	Report

== Second round ==
- 16 teams will compete in the second round.
- Winners will advance to the third round. Losers will compete in 16th Finals of 2017 Women's CEV Cup.
- All times are local.

Team 1	Agg.	Team 2	1st leg	2nd leg	Golden set
Minchanka Minsk (Belarus)	3–3	(Finland) HPK Hämeenlinna	3–1	0–3	15–10
Maritza Plovdiv (Bulgaria)	0–6	(Turkey) Eczacibasi VitrA Istanbul	0–3	0–3	
Linamar - Békéscsabai RSE (Hungary)	2–4	(Czech Republic) Agel Prostějov	0–3	3–2	
Maccabi Haifa (Israel)	0–6	(Poland) MKS Dąbrowa Górnicza	1–3	0–3	
Calcit Ljubljana (Slovenia)	0–6	(Italy) Liu Jo Nordmeccanica Modena	0–3	1–3	
ZOK Bimal-Jedinstvo Brčko (Bosnia and Herzegovina)	0–6	(France) RC Cannes	0–3	1–3	
Kohila VC (Estonia)	1–5	(Serbia) Vizura Beograd	2–3	0–3	
Khimik Yuzhny (Ukraine)	2–4	(Russia) Dinamo Krasnodar	2–3	2–3	

=== First leg ===
Date	Time		Score		Set 1	Set 2	Set 3	Set 4	Set 5	Total	Report
1 Nov	20:00	Minchanka Minsk (Belarus)	3–1	(Finland) HPK Hämeenlinna	25–15	25–18	22–25	25–19		97–77	Report
1 Nov	18:00	Maritza Plovdiv (Bulgaria)	0–3	(Turkey) Eczacibasi VitrA Istanbul	13–25	13–25	19–25			45–75	Report
1 Nov	18:00	Linamar - Békéscsabai RSE (Hungary)	0–3	(Czech Republic) Agel Prostějov	21–25	18–25	23–25			62–75	Report
1 Nov	19:00	Maccabi Haifa (Israel)	1–3	(Poland) MKS Dąbrowa Górnicza	16–25	20–25	25–19	22–25		83–94	Report
1 Nov	18:00	Calcit Ljubljana (Slovenia)	0–3	(Italy) Liu Jo Nordmeccanica Modena	19–25	21–25	22–25			62–75	Report
1 Nov	19:30	ZOK Bimal-Jedinstvo Brčko (Bosnia and Herzegovina)	0–3	(France) RC Cannes	8–25	21–25	16–25			45–75	Report
1 Nov	18:00	Kohila VC (Estonia)	2–3	(Serbia) Vizura Beograd	13–25	25–16	14–25	25–17	9–15	86–98	Report
1 Nov	17:00	Khimik Yuzhny (Ukraine)	2–3	(Russia) Dinamo Krasnodar	17–25	25–20	25–23	16–25	5–15	88–108	Report

=== Second leg ===
Date	Time		Score		Set 1	Set 2	Set 3	Set 4	Set 5	Total	Report
5 Nov	18:00	HPK Hämeenlinna (Finland)	3–0	(Belarus) Minchanka Minsk	25–23	25–16	25–13			75–52	Report
Golden set		HPK Hämeenlinna (Finland)	10–15	(Belarus) Minchanka Minsk							
5 Nov	17:00	Eczacibasi VitrA Istanbul (Turkey)	3–0	(Bulgaria) Maritza Plovdiv	25–16	25–15	25–19			75–50	Report
5 Nov	17:00	Agel Prostějov (Czech Republic)	2–3	(Hungary) Linamar - Békéscsabai RSE	33–31	25–21	14–25	27–29	10–15	109–121	Report
5 Nov	17:00	MKS Dąbrowa Górnicza (Poland)	3–0	(Israel) Maccabi Haifa	25–21	25–19	25–20			75–60	Report
5 Nov	20:30	Liu Jo Nordmeccanica Modena (Italy)	3–1	(Slovenia) Calcit Ljubljana	25–18	23–25	25–20	25–13		98–76	Report
5 Nov	20:40	RC Cannes (France)	3–1	(Bosnia and Herzegovina) ZOK Bimal-Jedinstvo Brčko	25–12	22–25	25–14	25–18		97–69	Report
5 Nov	18:00	Vizura Beograd (Serbia)	3–0	(Estonia) Kohila VC	25–20	25–18	25–15			75–53	Report
5 Nov	18:00	Dinamo Krasnodar (Russia)	3–2	(Ukraine) Khimik Yuzhny	12–25	29–27	25–14	23–25	15–5	104–96	Report

== Third round ==
- Second round winners will be paired up one another.
- Winners will advance to the League round. Losers will compete in 8th Finals of 2017 Women's CEV Cup.
- All times are local.

Team 1	Agg.	Team 2	1st leg	2nd leg
Minchanka Minsk (Belarus)	0–6	(Turkey) Eczacibasi VitrA Istanbul	1–3	0–3
Agel Prostějov (Czech Republic)	0–6	(Poland) MKS Dąbrowa Górnicza	1–3	1–3
Liu Jo Nordmeccanica Modena (Italy)	6–0	(France) RC Cannes	3–0	3–1
Vizura Beograd (Serbia)	2–4	(Russia) Dinamo Krasnodar	3–2	0–3

=== First leg ===
Date	Time		Score		Set 1	Set 2	Set 3	Set 4	Set 5	Total	Report
15 Nov	19:00	Minchanka Minsk (Belarus)	1–3	(Turkey) Eczacibasi VitrA Istanbul	22–25	25–21	11–25	19–25		77–96	Report
15 Nov	17:30	Agel Prostějov (Czech Republic)	1–3	(Poland) MKS Dąbrowa Górnicza	25–13	19–25	19–25	17–25		80–88	Report
15 Nov	20:30	Liu Jo Nordmeccanica Modena (Italy)	3–0	(France) RC Cannes	25–19	25–23	25–16			75–58	Report
15 Nov	17:30	Vizura Beograd (Serbia)	3–2	(Russia) Dinamo Krasnodar	23–25	25–21	19–25	25–19	15–7	107–97	Report

=== Second leg ===
Date	Time		Score		Set 1	Set 2	Set 3	Set 4	Set 5	Total	Report
19 Nov	17:00	Eczacibasi VitrA Istanbul (Turkey)	3–0	(Belarus) Minchanka Minsk	25–14	28–26	25–19			78–59	Report
19 Nov	17:00	MKS Dąbrowa Górnicza (Poland)	3–1	(Czech Republic) Agel Prostějov	25–19	23–25	25–19	26–24		99–87	Report
19 Nov	20:40	RC Cannes (France)	1–3	(Italy) Liu Jo Nordmeccanica Modena	24–26	26–28	25–23	9–25		84–102	Report
19 Nov	17:00	Dinamo Krasnodar (Russia)	3–0	(Serbia) Vizura Beograd	25–18	25–23	25–23			75–64	Report

== League round ==
- Drawing of lots was held on 9 June 2016

Pool Summary

Pool A	Pool B	Pool C	Pool D
(Poland) Chemik Police	(Russia) Dinamo Moscow	(Azerbaijan) Azerrail Baku	(Turkey) VakıfBank Istanbul
(Italy) Imoco Volley Conegliano	(Switzerland) Voléro Zürich	(France) Saint-Raphaël Var VB	(Germany) Dresdner SC
(Azerbaijan) Telekom Baku	(Romania) CS Volei Alba-Blaj	(Turkey) Fenerbahçe Grundig Istanbul	(Russia) Uralochka-NTMK Ekaterinburg
(Italy) Liu Jo Nordmeccanica Modena	(Russia) Dinamo Krasnodar	(Poland) MKS Dąbrowa Górnicza	(Turkey) Eczacibasi VitrA Istanbul
