= Jocelynn Birks =

American volleyball player

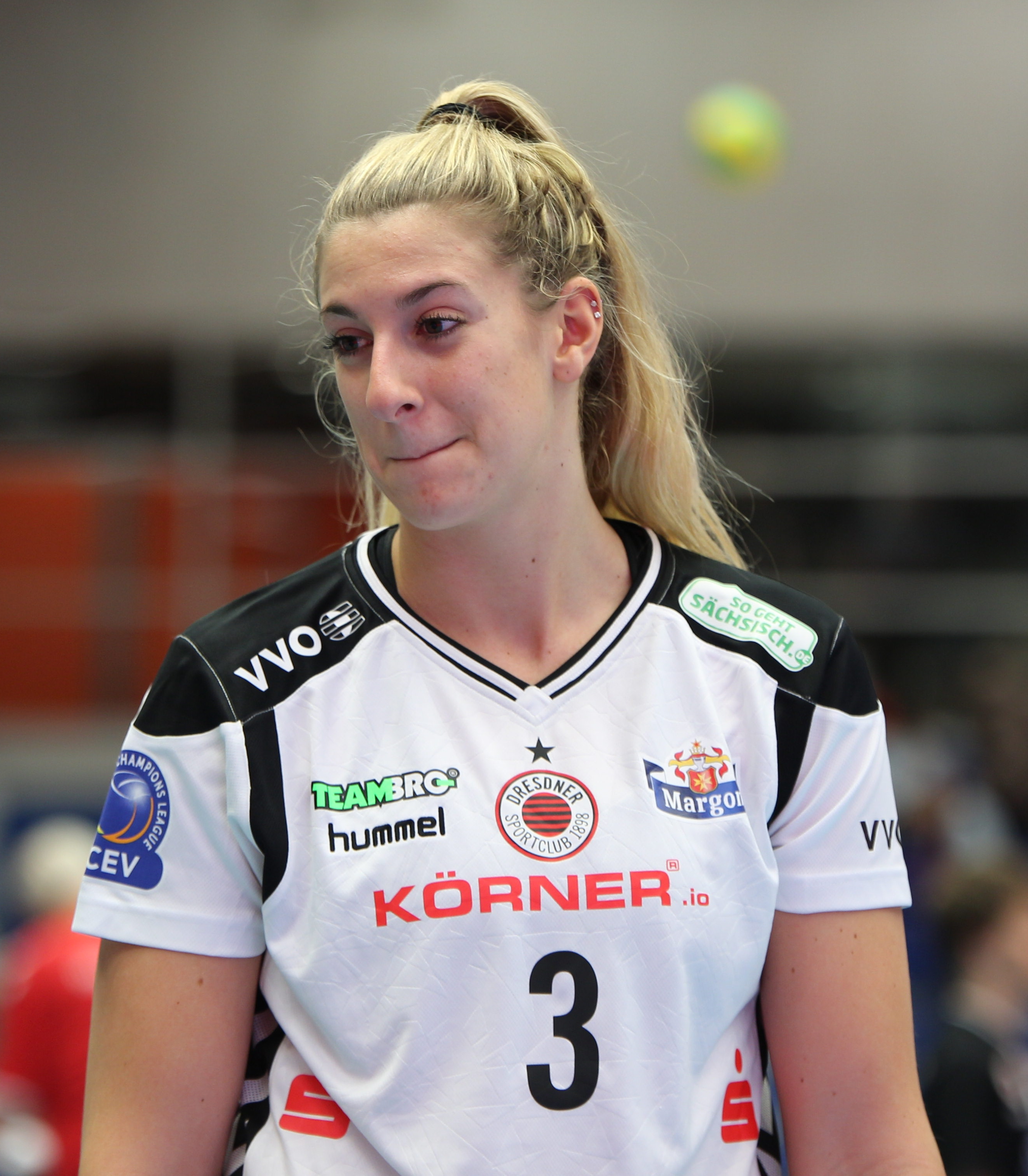

Personal information
- Born: August 21, 1993 (age 33)
- Education: University of Illinois

Volleyball information
- Position: libero
- Current club: Dresdner SC
- Number: 3

Jocelynn Birks (born August 21, 1993) is an American volleyball player who plays in the German Women's Volleyball League.

== Playing career ==
She played for the University of Illinois. She participated at the 2016–17 Women's CEV Cup, with Dresdner SC.

== Clubs ==
Club	Country	From	To
Dresdner SC	Germany	2016-2017	2016-2017
