= 2017–18 Women's CEV Cup =

- League: Women's CEV Cup
- Sport: Volleyball
- Duration: 12 December 2017 – 10 April 2018
- Number of teams: 32

Finals
- Champions: (Turkey) Eczacıbaşı VitrA Istanbul (2nd title)
- Runners-up: (Belarus) Minchanka Minsk
- Finals MVP: (Serbia) Tijana Bošković

Women's CEV Cup seasons
- ← 2016–17 2018–19 →

The 2017–18 Women's CEV Cup was the 46th edition of the European CEV Cup volleyball club tournament, the former "Top Teams Cup".

== Format ==
The tournament is played on a knockout format, with 32 teams participating. Initially 22 teams were allocated direct vacancies to enter the competition, with another 10 teams joining the competition via Champions League qualification. On 14 June 2017, a drawing of lots in Luxembourg City, Luxembourg, determined the team's pairing for each match. Each team plays a home and an away match with result points awarded for each leg (3 points for 3–0 or 3–1 wins, 2 points for 3–2 win, 1 point for 2–3 loss). After two legs, the team with the most result points advances to the next round. In case the teams are tied after two legs, a Golden Set is played immediately at the completion of the second leg. The Golden Set winner is the team that first obtains 15 points, provided that the points difference between the two teams is at least 2 points (thus, the Golden Set is similar to a tiebreak set in a normal match).

== Participating teams ==
- Drawing of lots for the 32 participating team was held in Luxembourg City, Luxembourg on 14 June 2017.
- 22 teams allocated vacancies spots and 10 teams qualified as Champions League qualification losers.

Rank	Country	No. teams			Qualified teams
Rank	Country	Vac	Qual	Total	Qualified teams
1	Turkey	1	-	1	Eczacıbaşı VitrA Istanbul
2	Russia	1	1	2	Uralochka-NTMK Ekaterinburg
2	Russia	1	1	2	Yenisei Krasnoyarsk^{1}
5	Germany	3	-	3	Allianz MTV Stuttgart
5	Germany	3	-	3	Dresdner SC
5	Germany	3	-	3	SSC Palmberg Schwerin
6	Switzerland	2	-	2	ZesarVFM Franches-Montagnes
6	Switzerland	2	-	2	TS Volley Düdingen
7	Italy	2	-	2	Pomì Casalmaggiore
7	Italy	2	-	2	Unet Yamamay Busto Arsizio
8	France	2	1	3	Beziers VB
8	France	2	1	3	Pays d'Aix Venelles VB
8	France	2	1	3	Rocheville Le Cannet^{1}
9	Romania	1	-	1	CSM București
10	Czech Republic	2	-	2	VK UP Olomouc
10	Czech Republic	2	-	2	Královo Pole Brno
11	Serbia	1	-	1	Jedinstvo Stara Pazova
12	Belgium	1	1	2	VC Oudegem
12	Belgium	1	1	2	Asterix Avo Beveren^{1}
13	Finland	1	1	2	HPK Hämeenlinna
13	Finland	1	1	2	LP Salo^{1}
14	Slovenia	1	1	2	Calcit Kamnik
14	Slovenia	1	1	2	Nova KBM Branik Maribor^{1}
15	Ukraine	1	-	1	Khimik Yuzhny
17	Israel	1	1	2	Maccabi XT Haifa
17	Israel	1	1	2	Hapoel Kfar Saba^{1}
18	Netherlands	1	1	2	VC Sneek
18	Netherlands	1	1	2	Sliedrecht Sport^{1}
19	Hungary	1	1	2	Fatum-Nyíregyháza
19	Hungary	1	1	2	Linamar-Békéscsabai RSE^{1}
20	Belarus	-	1	1	Minchanka Minsk^{1}
23	Bosnia and Herzegovina	-	1	1	ŽOK Bimal-Jedinstvo Brčko^{1}

1. Team qualified via Champions League qualification.

== Main phase ==
=== 16th Finals ===
- 1st leg (Team #1 home) 12–14 December 2017
- 2nd leg (Team #2 home) 9–11 January 2018

Match#	Team #1	Results	Team #2
1	VC Oudegem (Belgium)	0 – 3; 0 – 3	(Turkey) Eczacıbaşı VitrA Istanbul
2	Unet Yamamay Busto Arsizio (Italy)	3 – 0; 3 – 0	(Bosnia and Herzegovina) ŽOK Bimal-Jedinstvo Brčko
3	Calcit Kamnik (Slovenia)	1 – 3; 1 – 3	(Slovenia) Nova KBM Branik Maribor
4	HPK Hämeenlinna (Finland)	0 – 3; 0 – 3	(Russia) Yenisei Krasnoyarsk
5	VC Sneek (Netherlands)	0 – 3; 0 – 3	(Italy) Pomì Casalmaggiore
6	Maccabi XT Haifa (Israel)	1 – 3; 1 – 3	(Hungary) Linamar-Békéscsabai RSE
7	SSC Palmberg Schwerin (Germany)	3 – 1; 3 – 1	(France) Rocheville Le Cannet
8	Khimik Yuzhny (Ukraine)	3 – 0; 3 – 1	(Switzerland) ZesarVFM Franches-Montagnes
9	VK UP Olomouc (Czech Republic)	0 – 3; 0 – 3	(Germany) Allianz MTV Stuttgart
10	Fatum-Nyíregyháza (Hungary)	0 – 3; 0 – 3	(Belgium) Asterix Avo Beveren
11	TS Volley Düdingen (Switzerland)	3 – 1; 0 – 3 Golden Set: 15–13	(Israel) Hapoel Kfar Saba
12	Dresdner SC (Germany)	3 – 0; 3 – 0	(France) Pays d'Aix Venelles VB
13	Jedinstvo Stara Pazova (Serbia)	1 – 3; 0 – 3	(Belarus) Minchanka Minsk
14	Beziers VB (France)	3 – 0; 3 – 0	(Netherlands) Sliedrecht Sport
15	Královo Pole Brno (Czech Republic)	0 – 3; 3 – 0 Golden Set: 15–13	(Finland) LP Salo
16	CSM București (Romania)	0 – 3; 2 – 3	(Russia) Uralochka-NTMK Ekaterinburg

=== 8th Finals ===
- 1st leg (Team #1 home) 23–25 January 2018
- 2nd leg (Team #2 home) 6–8 February 2018

Match#	Team #1	Results	Team #2
17	Eczacıbaşı VitrA Istanbul (Turkey)	3 – 1; 3 – 1	(Italy) Unet Yamamay Busto Arsizio
18	Yenisei Krasnoyarsk (Russia)	3 – 0; 3 – 1	(Slovenia) Nova KBM Branik Maribor
19	Linamar-Békéscsabai RSE (Hungary)	0 – 3; 0 – 3	(Italy) Pomì Casalmaggiore
20	SSC Palmberg Schwerin (Germany)	3 – 0; 3 – 1	(Ukraine) Khimik Yuzhny
21	Allianz MTV Stuttgart (Germany)	3 – 0; 2 – 3	(Belgium) Asterix Avo Beveren
22	TS Volley Düdingen (Switzerland)	0 – 3; 1 – 3	(Germany) Dresdner SC
23	Beziers VB (France)	3 – 2; 1 – 3	(Belarus) Minchanka Minsk
24	Uralochka-NTMK Ekaterinburg (Russia)	3 – 0; 3 – 1	(Czech Republic) Královo Pole Brno

=== 4th Finals ===
- 1st leg (Team #1 home) 20–22 February 2018
- 2nd leg (Team #2 home) 27 February – 1 March 2018

Match#	Team #1	Results	Team #2
25	Yenisei Krasnoyarsk (Russia)	1 – 3; 0 – 3	(Turkey) Eczacıbaşı VitrA Istanbul
26	Pomì Casalmaggiore (Italy)	0 – 3; 1 – 3	(Germany) SSC Palmberg Schwerin
27	Dresdner SC (Germany)	0 – 3; 1 – 3	(Germany) Allianz MTV Stuttgart
28	Uralochka-NTMK Ekaterinburg (Russia)	1 – 3; 0 – 3	(Belarus) Minchanka Minsk

== Final phase ==
=== Semifinals ===
- 1st leg (Team #1 home) 13 March 2018
- 2nd leg (Team #2 home) 20 March 2018

Match#	Team #1	Results	Team #2
29	SSC Palmberg Schwerin (Germany)	0 – 3; 0 – 3	(Turkey) Eczacıbaşı VitrA Istanbul
30	Allianz MTV Stuttgart (Germany)	2 – 3; 3 – 2 Golden Set: 8–15	(Belarus) Minchanka Minsk

=== Finals ===
- 1st leg (Team #1 home) 3 April 2018
- 2nd leg (Team #2 home) 10 April 2018

Match#	Team #1	Results	Team #2
31	Minchanka Minsk (Belarus)	1 – 3; 0 – 3	(Turkey) Eczacıbaşı VitrA Istanbul
