= Ana Cleger =

Cuban volleyball player (born 1989)

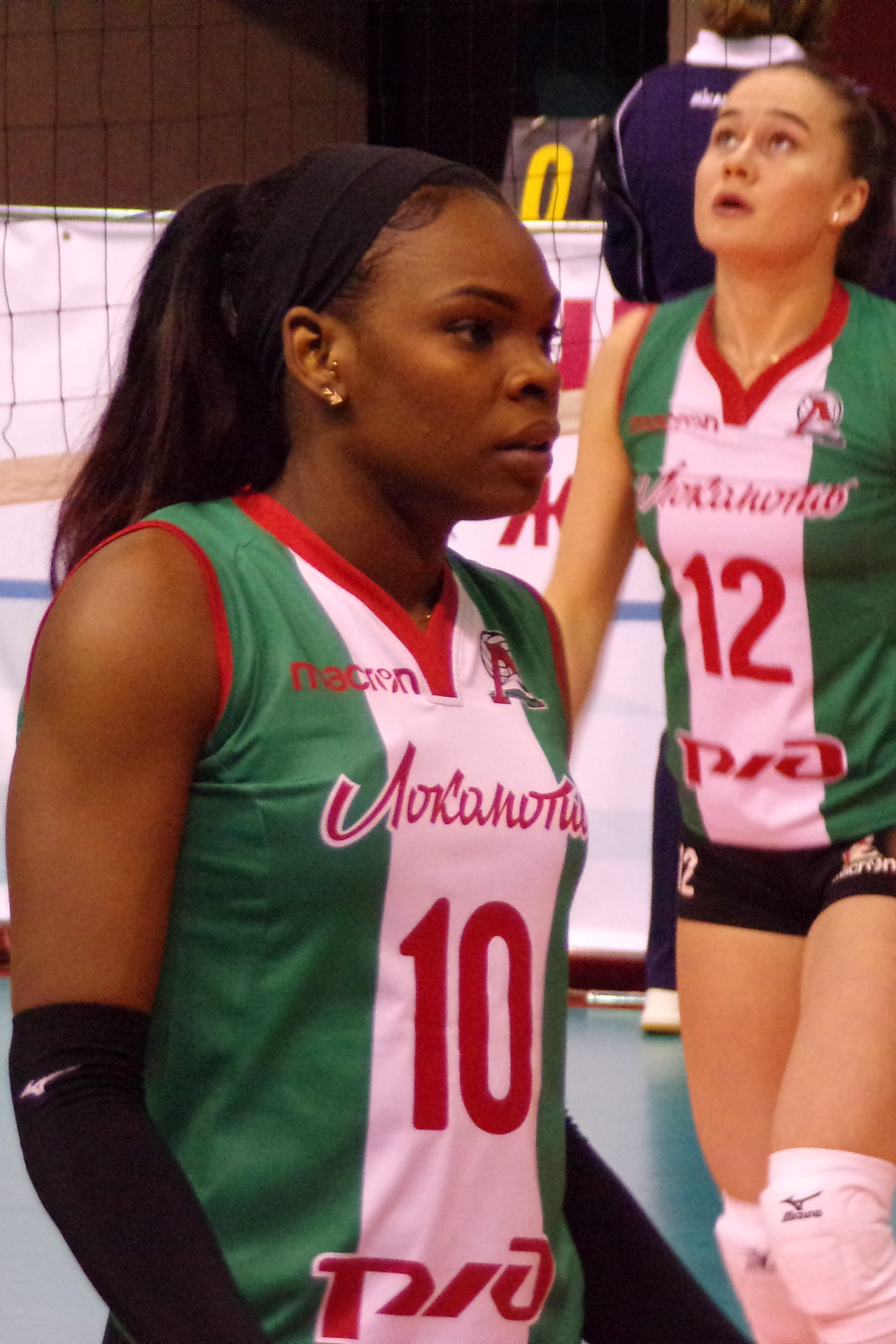

Personal information
- Full name: Ana Yilian Cleger Abel
- Nationality: Cuban
- Born: 27 November 1989 (age 36)
- Height: 1.83 m (6 ft 0 in)
- Weight: 69 kg (152 lb)
- Spike: 300 cm (118 in)
- Block: 285 cm (112 in)

Volleyball information
- Position: Opposite

Career
- Years: Team
- 2018: Lokomotiv Kaliningrad

National team
- Years: Team
- 2006-2013: Cuba
Honours
Women's volleyball
Representing Cuba
Pan American Games
Silver medal – second place	2011 Guadalajara	Team

Ana Yilian Cleger Abel (born 27 November 1989) is a Cuban volleyball player. She was part of the Cuba women's national volleyball team.

She participated at the 2010 FIVB Volleyball Women's World Championship in Japan. She left the Cuban team before the 2013 FIVB Volleyball World Grand Prix. She played with Santiago de Cuba, and for VakıfBank Istanbul at the 2017–18 CEV Women's Champions League.

== Clubs ==
- Santiago de Cuba (2010)
- (Turkey) Vakıfbank S.K. (2018)

== Awards ==
=== Individuals ===
- 2017-18 CEV Champions League "Best Opposite Spiker"

=== Clubs ===
- 2017–18 CEV Champions League - Runner-Up, with CSM Volei Alba Blaj

Awards
Preceded by (Netherlands) Lonneke Sloetjes	Best Opposite Spiker of CEV Champions League; 2017-2018	Succeeded by TBA
