= Milena Rašić =

Serbian volleyball player

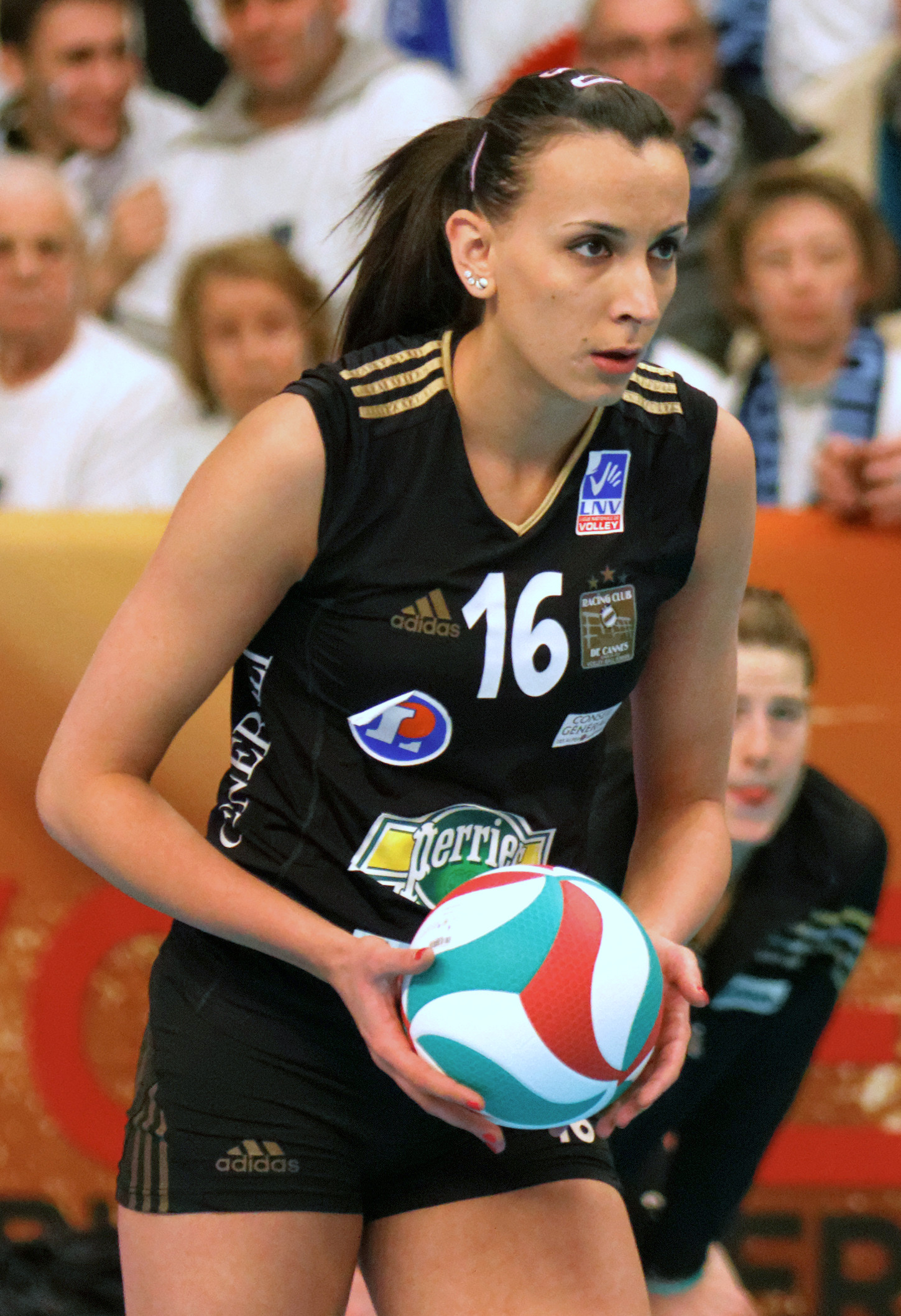
- Rašić in 2013

Personal information
- Nationality: Serbian
- Born: 25 October 1990 (age 36); Priština, SR Serbia, SFR Yugoslavia
- Height: 1.93 m (6 ft 4 in)
- Weight: 75 kg (165 lb)
- Spike: 315 cm (124 in)
- Block: 310 cm (122 in)

Volleyball information
- Position: Middle blocker
- Current club: Vakifbank Istanbul
- Number: 16

Career
Years	Teams
2002–2007; 2007–2010; 2010–2014; 2014–2021	Sumadija AV Arandjelovac; Dinamo Azotara Pančevo; RC Cannes; Vakıfbank İstanbul

National team
2009–2021	Serbia
Honours
Women's volleyball
Representing Serbia
Olympic Games
Silver medal – second place	2016 Rio de Janeiro	Team
Bronze medal – third place	2020 Tokyo	Team
World Championship
Gold medal – first place	2018 Japan	Team
European Championships
Gold medal – first place	2011 Serbia/Italy
Gold medal – first place	2017 Azerbaijan/Georgia
Silver medal – second place	2021 Serbia/Croatia/Bulgaria/Romania
Bronze medal – third place	2015 Netherlands/Belgium
World Cup
Silver medal – second place	2015 Japan
FIVB World Grand Prix
Bronze medal – third place	2011 Macau
Bronze medal – third place	2013 Sapporo
Bronze medal – third place	2017 Nanjing
European Games
Bronze medal – third place	2015 Baku	Team
European League
Gold medal – first place	2010 Ankara
Gold medal – first place	2011 Istanbul
Bronze medal – third place	2012 Karlovy Vary
Universiade
Silver medal – second place	2009 Belgrade	Team

Milena Rašić (Serbian Cyrillic: Милена Рашић; born 25 October 1990) is a Serbian former professional volleyball player. She played for the Serbia women's national volleyball team. She won a silver medal at the 2016 Summer Olympics and also competed at the 2012 Summer Olympics. She won a bronze medal at the 2020 Summer Olympics. She is 1.93 m (6 ft 4 in) tall.

== Career ==
Having been part of the Serbian team that finished in last place at the London Olympics, Rašić was part of the Serbian team that won the silver medal at the 2016 Summer Olympics.

Rašić won the 2016–17 CEV Champions League gold medal with VakıfBank Istanbul when her team defeated the Italian Imoco Volley Conegliano 3-0 and she was also awarded Best Middle Blocker. She won the bronze medal of the 2017 FIVB World Grand Prix and the Best Middle Blocker individual award.

== Awards ==
=== Individual awards ===
- 2011 World Grand Prix "Best Spiker"
- 2013 World Grand Prix "Best Middle Blocker"
- 2014–15 CEV Champions League "Best Middle Blocker"
- 2015–16 Turkish Women's Volleyball League "Best Middle Blockers"
- 2016 Olympic Games "Best Middle Blocker"
- 2016 FIVB Club World Championship "Best Middle Blocker"
- 2016–17 CEV Champions League "Best Middle Blocker"
- 2017 World Grand Prix "Best Middle Blocker"
- 2017–18 CEV Champions League "Best Middle Blocker"
- 2018 FIVB World Championship "Best Middle Blocker"
- 2018 FIVB Women's Club World Championship "Best Middle Blocker"

=== Clubs ===
- 2016–17 CEV Champions League - Champion, with VakıfBank Istanbul
- 2017–18 CEV Champions League - Champion, with VakıfBank
- 2017 Club World Championship - Champion, with VakıfBank
- 2018 Club World Championship - Champion, with VakıfBank
- 2017 Turkish Super Cup - Champion, with VakıfBank
- 2017–18 Turkish League - Champion, with VakıfBank
- 2018–19 Turkish League - Champion, with VakıfBank
- 2019 FIVB Club World Championship – Bronze medal, with VakıfBank
- 2021 Turkish Cup - Champion, with VakıfBank S.K.
- 2020–21 Turkish League - Champion, with VakıfBank
- 2020-21 CEV Champions League - Runner-Up, with Vakıfbank S.K.

== Gallery ==
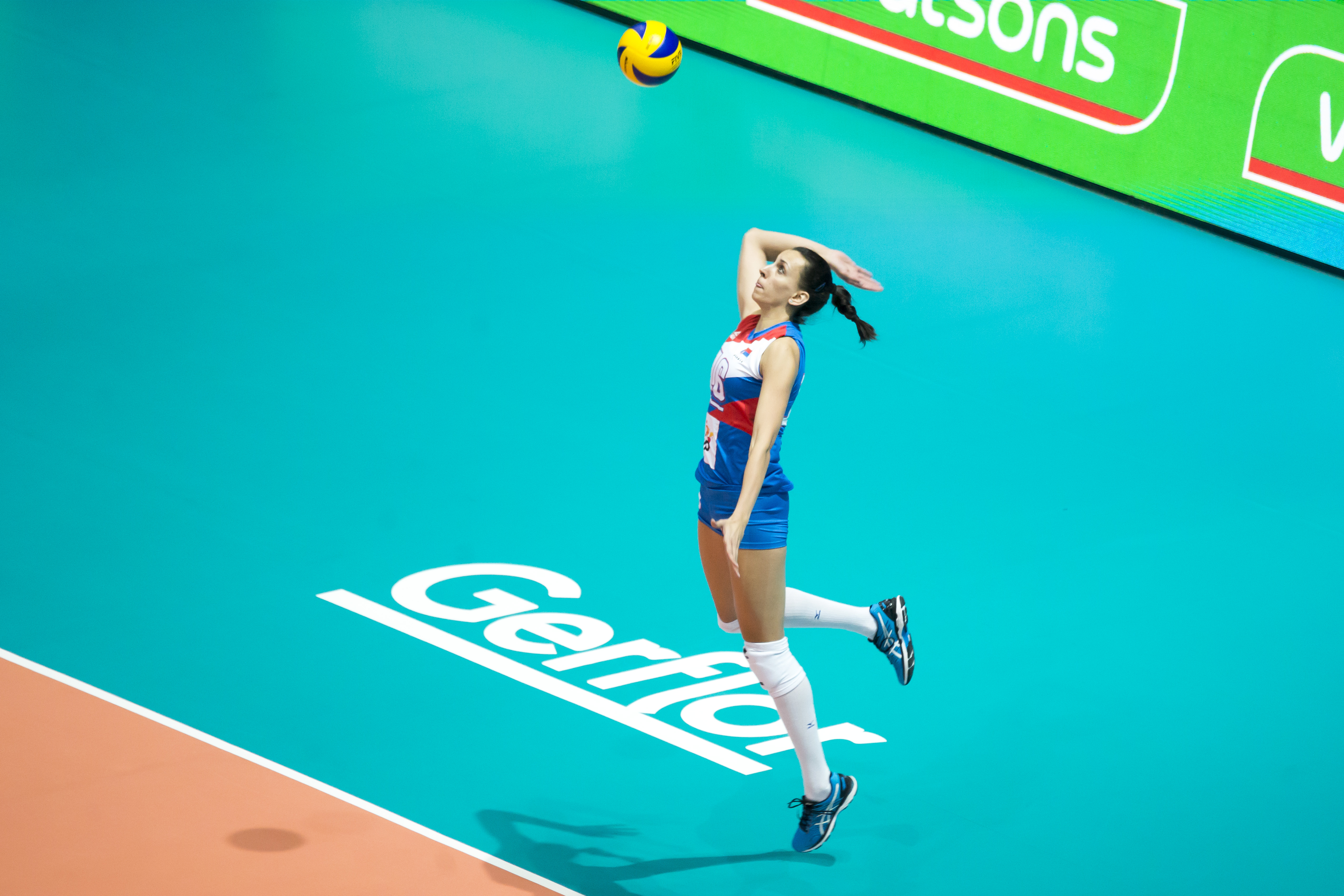
Rašić at serve

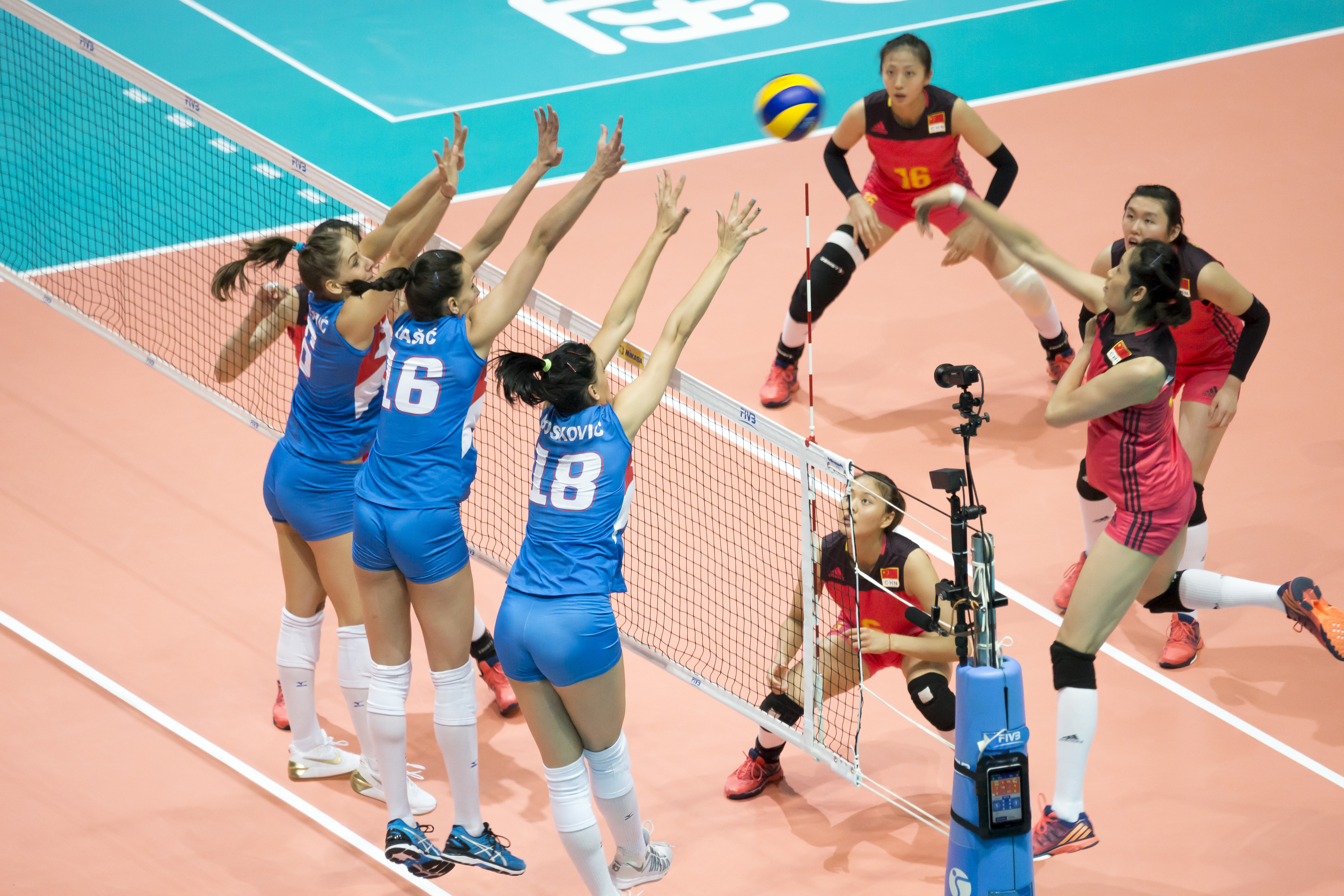
Triple block by Rašić, Tijana Bošković, and Tijana Malešević

Awards
Preceded by (Croatia) Maja Poljak (Turkey) Kübra Akman	Best Middle Blockers of FIVB Club World Championship; 2018; With: (Brazil) Mayany de Souza	Succeeded by TBD
