= 2017–18 CEV Women's Champions League qualification =

Qualification phase of European volleyball league

This article shows the qualification phase for 2017–18 CEV Women's Champions League. A total of 14 teams entered this qualification round. During qualification, the winners keep on progressing until the last 4 teams standing join the 12 teams which have directly qualified to the main tournament League round based on the European Cups' Ranking List. All 10 teams which do not progress in qualification are allocated to the 2017–18 Women's CEV Cup.

== Participating teams ==
| Rank | Country | No. teams | Team(s) | Outcome (qualified to) |
|---|---|---|---|---|
| 1 | Turkey | 1 | Vakıfbank Istanbul^{2} | Pool D of Champions League |
| 2 | Russia | 1 | Yenisei Krasnoyarsk^{2} | 16th Finals of CEV Cup |
| 3 | Poland | 1 | Developres SkyRes Rzeszów^{1} | Pool A of Champions League |
| 7 | Italy | 1 | Imoco Volley Conegliano^{1} | Pool B of Champions League |
| 8 | France | 1 | Rocheville Le Cannet^{1} | 16th Finals of CEV Cup |
| 12 | Belgium | 1 | Asterix Avo Beveren^{1} | 16th Finals of CEV Cup |
| 13 | Finland | 1 | LP Salo^{1} | 16th Finals of CEV Cup |
| 14 | Slovenia | 1 | Nova KBM Branik Maribor^{1} | 16th Finals of CEV Cup |
| 17 | Israel | 1 | Hapoel Kfar Saba^{1} | 16th Finals of CEV Cup |
| 18 | Netherlands | 1 | Sliedrecht Sport^{1} | 16th Finals of CEV Cup |
| 19 | Hungary | 1 | Linamar-Békéscsabai RSE^{1} | 16th Finals of CEV Cup |
| 20 | Belarus | 1 | Minchanka Minsk^{1} | 16th Finals of CEV Cup |
| 23 | Bosnia and Herzegovina | 1 | ŽOK Bimal-Jedinstvo Brčko^{1} | 16th Finals of CEV Cup |
| 28 | Bulgaria | 1 | Maritza Plovdiv^{1} | Pool C of Champions League |

1. Team entering at the 2nd round.
2. Team entering at the 3rd round.

== Second round ==
- 12 teams compete in the second round.
- Winners advance to the third round. Losers will compete in 16th Finals of the 2017–18 Women's CEV Cup.
- All times are local.

| Team 1 | Agg. | Team 2 | 1st leg | 2nd leg | Golden set |
|---|---|---|---|---|---|
| Hapoel Kfar Saba (Israel) | 0–6 | (Poland) Developres SkyRes Rzeszów | 1–3 | 0–3 | |
| Linamar-Békéscsabai RSE (Hungary) | 0–6 | (Italy) Imoco Volley Conegliano | 0–3 | 0–3 | |
| Minchanka Minsk (Belarus) | 4–2 | (France) Rocheville Le Cannet | 3–2 | 3–2 | |
| Sliedrecht Sport (Netherlands) | 5–1 | (Belgium) Asterix Avo Beveren | 3–2 | 3–1 | |
| Maritza Plovdiv (Bulgaria) | 3–3 | (Finland) LP Salo | 3–1 | 1–3 | 15–12 |
| ŽOK Bimal-Jedinstvo Brčko (Bosnia and Herzegovina) | 0–6 | (Slovenia) Nova KBM Branik Maribor | 0–3 | 0–3 | |

Notes

- The table displays teams (1 and 2) as per draw result.
- The order of the fixtures between Minchanka Minsk and Rocheville Le Cannet was reversed, the first leg was played in France and the second in Belarus.

=== First leg ===
| Date | Time | | Score | | Set 1 | Set 2 | Set 3 | Set 4 | Set 5 | Total | Report |
|---|---|---|---|---|---|---|---|---|---|---|---|
| 17 Oct | 19:30 | Hapoel Kfar Saba (Israel) | 1–3 | (Poland) Developres SkyRes Rzeszów | 20–25 | 28–30 | 32–30 | 13–25 | | 93–110 | Report |
| 17 Oct | 18:00 | Linamar-Békéscsabai RSE (Hungary) | 0–3 | (Italy) Imoco Volley Conegliano | 4–25 | 10–25 | 17–25 | | | 31–75 | Report |
| 17 Oct | 20:00 | Rocheville Le Cannet (France) | 2–3 | (Belarus) Minchanka Minsk | 22–25 | 27–25 | 25–22 | 26–28 | 13–15 | 113–115 | Report |
| 17 Oct | 19:00 | Sliedrecht Sport (Netherlands) | 3–2 | (Belgium) Asterix Avo Beveren | 25–19 | 25–23 | 24–26 | 23–25 | 15–13 | 112–106 | Report |
| 17 Oct | 19:00 | ŽOK Bimal-Jedinstvo Brčko (Bosnia and Herzegovina) | 0–3 | (Slovenia) Nova KBM Branik Maribor | 17–25 | 13–25 | 22–25 | | | 52–75 | Report |
| 19 Oct | 19:00 | Maritza Plovdiv (Bulgaria) | 3–1 | (Finland) LP Salo | 25–18 | 25–20 | 23–25 | 25–21 | | 98–84 | Report |

=== Second leg ===
| Date | Time | | Score | | Set 1 | Set 2 | Set 3 | Set 4 | Set 5 | Total | Report |
|---|---|---|---|---|---|---|---|---|---|---|---|
| 21 Oct | 20:00 | Developres SkyRes Rzeszów (Poland) | 3–0 | (Israel) Hapoel Kfar Saba | 25–21 | 25–19 | 25–15 | | | 75–55 | Report |
| 21 Oct | 20:35 | Imoco Volley Conegliano (Italy) | 3–0 | (Hungary) Linamar-Békéscsabai RSE | 25–11 | 25–10 | 25–15 | | | 75–36 | Report |
| 21 Oct | 17:00 | Minchanka Minsk (Belarus) | 3–2 | (France) Rocheville Le Cannet | 25–21 | 25–12 | 21–25 | 22–25 | 18–16 | 111–99 | Report |
| 21 Oct | 19:30 | Asterix Avo Beveren (Belgium) | 1–3 | (Netherlands) Sliedrecht Sport | 25–13 | 24–26 | 21–25 | 17–25 | | 87–89 | Report |
| 21 Oct | 18:00 | Nova KBM Branik Maribor (Slovenia) | 3–0 | (Bosnia and Herzegovina) ŽOK Bimal-Jedinstvo Brčko | 25–17 | 25–21 | 25–16 | | | 75–54 | Report |
| 25 Oct | 19:00 | LP Salo (Finland) | 3–1 | (Bulgaria) Maritza Plovdiv | 14–25 | 25–22 | 26–24 | 25–19 | | 90–90 | Report |
| Golden set | | LP Salo (Finland) | 12–15 | (Bulgaria) Maritza Plovdiv | | | | | | | |

== Third round ==
- 8 teams compete in the third round.
- Winners advance to the League round. Losers will compete in 16th Finals of the 2017–18 Women's CEV Cup.
- All times are local.

| Team 1 | Agg. | Team 2 | 1st leg | 2nd leg | Golden set |
|---|---|---|---|---|---|
| Minchanka Minsk (Belarus) | 0–6 | (Turkey) Vakıfbank Istanbul | 0–3 | 0–3 | |
| Maritza Plovdiv (Bulgaria) | 3–3 | (Russia) Yenisei Krasnoyarsk | 2–3 | 3–2 | 15–11 |
| Nova KBM Branik Maribor (Slovenia) | 0–6 | (Poland) Developres SkyRes Rzeszów | 1–3 | 1–3 | |
| Sliedrecht Sport (Netherlands) | 0–6 | (Italy) Imoco Volley Conegliano | 0–3 | 0–3 | |

=== First leg ===
| Date | Time | | Score | | Set 1 | Set 2 | Set 3 | Set 4 | Set 5 | Total | Report |
|---|---|---|---|---|---|---|---|---|---|---|---|
| 7 Nov | 17:00 | Minchanka Minsk (Belarus) | 0–3 | (Turkey) Vakıfbank Istanbul | 17–25 | 20–25 | 27–29 | | | 64–79 | Report |
| 7 Nov | 18:00 | Maritza Plovdiv (Bulgaria) | 2–3 | (Russia) Yenisei Krasnoyarsk | 25–21 | 25–18 | 22–25 | 20–25 | 14–16 | 106–105 | Report |
| 7 Nov | 20:00 | Nova KBM Branik Maribor (Slovenia) | 1–3 | (Poland) Developres SkyRes Rzeszów | 22–25 | 25–23 | 23–25 | 22–25 | | 92–98 | Report |
| 7 Nov | 19:00 | Sliedrecht Sport (Netherlands) | 0–3 | (Italy) Imoco Volley Conegliano | 15–25 | 23–25 | 21–25 | | | 59–75 | Report |

=== Second leg ===
| Date | Time | | Score | | Set 1 | Set 2 | Set 3 | Set 4 | Set 5 | Total | Report |
|---|---|---|---|---|---|---|---|---|---|---|---|
| 11 Nov | 17:00 | Vakıfbank Istanbul (Turkey) | 3–0 | (Belarus) Minchanka Minsk | 25–21 | 25–16 | 25–16 | | | 75–53 | Report |
| 11 Nov | 17:00 | Yenisei Krasnoyarsk (Russia) | 2–3 | (Bulgaria) Maritza Plovdiv | 25–20 | 25–19 | 22–25 | 25–27 | 12–15 | 109–106 | Report |
| Golden set | | Yenisei Krasnoyarsk (Russia) | 11–15 | (Bulgaria) Maritza Plovdiv | | | | | | | |
| 11 Nov | 18:30 | Developres SkyRes Rzeszów (Poland) | 3–1 | (Slovenia) Nova KBM Branik Maribor | 25–15 | 25–20 | 20–25 | 27–25 | | 97–85 | Report |
| 11 Nov | 20:30 | Imoco Volley Conegliano (Italy) | 3–0 | (Netherlands) Sliedrecht Sport | 25–10 | 25–12 | 25–7 | | | 75–29 | Report |
