= 2016–17 CEV Women's Champions League =

- League: CEV Women's Champions League
- Sport: Volleyball
- Duration: Qualifying round: 18 October – 19 November 2016; Main tournament: 13 December 2016 – 23 April 2017
- Matches: 86 (28 qual. + 58 main tourn.)
- Teams: 30 (18 qual. + 12 main tourn.)

Finals
- Champions: (Turkey) VakıfBank Istanbul (3rd title)
- Runners-up: (Italy) Imoco Volley Conegliano
- Finals MVP: (China) Zhu Ting

CEV Women's Champions League seasons
- ← 2015–16 2017–18 →

The CEV Champions League was the highest level of European club volleyball in the 2016–17 season and the 57th edition. The Turkish club VakıfBank Istanbul won its third title and qualified to the 2017 FIVB Club World Championship as European champion, besides being already invited by the FIVB, along with Eczacıbaşı VitrA and Voléro Zürich. The Italian club Imoco Volley Conegliano won the silver medal and Turkish Eczacıbaşı VitrA claimed the bronze medal. The Chinese Zhu Ting from VakıfBank Istanbul was awarded Most Valuable Player. Fourth placed club, Dinamo Moscow later received the last wild card to the Club World Championship by the FIVB.

== Qualification ==
A total of 16 team participate of the main competition, with 12 teams being allocated direct vacancies on the basis of ranking list for European Cup Competitions and 4 teams qualified from the qualification rounds.

Rank	Country	No. teams			Qualified teams
Rank	Country	Vac	Qual	Total	Qualified teams
1	Turkey	2	1	3	Eczacıbaşı VitrA Istanbul^{1}
1	Turkey	2	1	3	Fenerbahçe SK Istanbul
1	Turkey	2	1	3	VakıfBank Istanbul
2	Russia	2	1	3	Dinamo Krasnodar^{1}
2	Russia	2	1	3	Dinamo Moscow
2	Russia	2	1	3	Uralochka-NTMK Ekaterinburg
3	Poland	1	1	2	Chemik Police
3	Poland	1	1	2	MKS Dąbrowa Górnicza^{1}
4	Azerbaijan	2	-	2	Azerrail Baku
4	Azerbaijan	2	-	2	Telekom Baku
5	France	1	-	1	Saint-Raphaël Var VB
6	Italy	1	1	2	Imoco Volley Conegliano
6	Italy	1	1	2	Liu Jo Nordmeccanica Modena^{1}
7	Germany	1	-	1	Dresdner SC
8	Switzerland	1	-	1	Voléro Zürich
9	Romania	1	-	1	CS Volei Alba Blaj

1.Team qualified via Champions League qualification round.

== Format ==
League round

A round-robin format (each team plays every other team in its pool twice, once home and once away) where 16 teams were drawn to 4 pools of 4 teams each.
Pool winners and two second place with the best results qualified for the Playoffs.
The organizer of the Final Four were determined during the League Round and qualified directly for the Final Four.

The standings is determined by the number of matches won. In case of a tie in the number of matches won by two or more teams, their ranking is based on the following criteria:

- result points (points awarded for results: 3 points for 3–0 or 3–1 wins, 2 points for 3–2 win, 1 point for 2–3 loss);
- set quotient (the number of total sets won divided by the number of total sets lost);
- points quotient (the number of total points scored divided by the number of total points lost);
- results of head-to-head matches between the teams in question.

Playoffs

A knockout format where the 6 qualified teams are each draw into one of the 3 matches with each match consisting of two legs (home and away).
Result points are awarded for each leg (3 points for 3–0 or 3–1 wins, 2 points for 3–2 win, 1 point for 2–3 loss). After two legs, the team with the most result points advances to the Final Four. In case the teams are tied after two legs, a Golden Set is played immediately at the completion of the second leg. The Golden Set winner is the team that first obtains 15 points, provided that the points difference between the two teams is at least 2 points (thus, the Golden Set is similar to a tiebreak set in a normal match).

Final Four

A single-elimination format where the three winners of the Playoffs are joined by the Final Four hosts and draw to play the semifinals (winners advance to the final and losers to the 3rd place match). In case two teams from the same country qualify for the semifinals, they will play each other.

== Pools composition ==
- Drawing of lots was held in Rome, Italy on 9 June 2016.

Pool A	Pool B	Pool C	Pool D
(Poland) Chemik Police	(Russia) Dinamo Moscow	(Azerbaijan) Azerrail Baku	(Turkey) VakıfBank Istanbul
(Italy) Imoco Volley Conegliano	(Switzerland) Voléro Zürich	(France) Saint-Raphaël Var VB	(Germany) Dresdner SC
(Azerbaijan) Telekom Baku	(Romania) CS Volei Alba Blaj	(Turkey) Fenerbahçe SK Istanbul	(Russia) Uralochka-NTMK Ekaterinburg
(Italy) Liu Jo Nordmeccanica Modena	(Russia) Dinamo Krasnodar	(Poland) MKS Dąbrowa Górnicza	(Turkey) Eczacıbaşı VitrA Istanbul

== League round ==
- All times are local.

=== Pool A ===
Pos	Team	Pld	W	L	Pts	SW	SL	SR	SPW	SPL	SPR	Qualification
1	(Italy) Liu Jo Nordmeccanica Modena	6	5	1	15	17	7	2.429	570	510	1.118	Playoff round
2	(Italy) Imoco Volley Conegliano	6	4	2	12	16	10	1.600	566	525	1.078	Hosts of the Final Four
3	(Poland) Chemik Police	6	3	3	9	12	12	1.000	511	491	1.041	
4	(Azerbaijan) Telekom Baku	6	0	6	0	2	18	0.111	380	501	0.758	

Date	Time		Score		Set 1	Set 2	Set 3	Set 4	Set 5	Total	Report
14 Dec	20:30	Imoco Volley Conegliano (Italy)	3–0	(Azerbaijan) Telekom Baku	31–29	25–14	25–22			81–65	Report
15 Dec	18:00	Chemik Police (Poland)	1–3	(Italy) Liu Jo Nordmeccanica Modena	21–25	27–29	25–21	13–25		86–100	Report
10 Jan	17:00	Telekom Baku (Azerbaijan)	0–3	(Poland) Chemik Police	16–25	21–25	20–25			57–75	Report
12 Jan	20:30	Liu Jo Nordmeccanica Modena (Italy)	3–2	(Italy) Imoco Volley Conegliano	23–25	26–24	20–25	25–23	16–14	110–111	Report
25 Jan	18:00	Chemik Police (Poland)	2–3	(Italy) Imoco Volley Conegliano	18–25	25–14	25–12	14–25	11–15	93–91	Report
25 Jan	20:30	Liu Jo Nordmeccanica Modena (Italy)	3–0	(Azerbaijan) Telekom Baku	25–20	25–16	26–24			76–60	Report
8 Feb	17:00	Telekom Baku (Azerbaijan)	1–3	(Italy) Liu Jo Nordmeccanica Modena	20–25	25–23	23–25	22–25		90–98	Report
8 Feb	20:30	Imoco Volley Conegliano (Italy)	2–3	(Poland) Chemik Police	25–23	20–25	20–25	25–20	8–15	98–108	Report
21 Feb	18:00	Chemik Police (Poland)	3–1	(Azerbaijan) Telekom Baku	21–25	25–16	25–13	25–16		96–70	Report
22 Feb	20:30	Imoco Volley Conegliano (Italy)	3–2	(Italy) Liu Jo Nordmeccanica Modena	26–24	19–25	22–25	25–21	18–16	110–111	Report
28 Feb	17:00	Telekom Baku (Azerbaijan)	0–3	(Italy) Imoco Volley Conegliano	13–25	9–25	16–25			38–75	Report
28 Feb	20:30	Liu Jo Nordmeccanica Modena (Italy)	3–0	(Poland) Chemik Police	25–13	25–18	25–22			75–53	Report

=== Pool B ===
Pos	Team	Pld	W	L	Pts	SW	SL	SR	SPW	SPL	SPR	Qualification
1	(Russia) Dinamo Moscow	6	6	0	15	18	8	2.250	592	508	1.165	Playoff round
2	(Switzerland) Voléro Zürich	6	4	2	14	16	7	2.286	522	462	1.130	Playoff round
3	(Russia) Dinamo Krasnodar	6	1	5	4	6	16	0.375	436	521	0.837	
4	(Romania) CS Volei Alba Blaj	6	1	5	3	6	15	0.400	431	490	0.880	

Date	Time		Score		Set 1	Set 2	Set 3	Set 4	Set 5	Total	Report
13 Dec	19:00	Dinamo Krasnodar (Russia)	1–3	(Switzerland) Voléro Zürich	15–25	21–25	27–25	18–25		81–100	Report
14 Dec	19:00	Dinamo Moscow (Russia)	3–1	(Romania) CS Volei Alba Blaj	23–25	25–19	25–21	25–14		98–79	Report
11 Jan	18:00	CS Volei Alba Blaj (Romania)	1–3	(Russia) Dinamo Krasnodar	23–25	25–16	19–25	22–25		89–91	Report
12 Jan	20:00	Voléro Zürich (Switzerland)	2–3	(Russia) Dinamo Moscow	17–25	25–20	25–22	18–25	11–15	96–107	Report
25 Jan	18:00	CS Volei Alba Blaj (Romania)	0–3	(Switzerland) Voléro Zürich	21–25	15–25	16–25			52–75	Report
25 Jan	19:00	Dinamo Moscow (Russia)	3–2	(Russia) Dinamo Krasnodar	25–11	21–25	19–25	25–11	15–10	105–82	Report
7 Feb	19:00	Dinamo Krasnodar (Russia)	0–3	(Russia) Dinamo Moscow	19–25	22–25	25–27			66–77	Report
9 Feb	20:00	Voléro Zürich (Switzerland)	3–0	(Romania) CS Volei Alba Blaj	25–17	25–18	25–17			75–52	Report
21 Feb	19:00	Dinamo Krasnodar (Russia)	0–3	(Romania) CS Volei Alba Blaj	18–25	18–25	17–25			53–75	Report
22 Feb	19:00	Dinamo Moscow (Russia)	3–2	(Switzerland) Voléro Zürich	25–19	22–25	20–25	25–20	15–12	107–101	Report
28 Feb	18:00	CS Volei Alba Blaj (Romania)	1–3	(Russia) Dinamo Moscow	21–25	25–23	16–25	22–25		84–98	Report
28 Feb	20:00	Voléro Zürich (Switzerland)	3–0	(Russia) Dinamo Krasnodar	25–18	25–23	25–22			75–63	Report

=== Pool C ===
Pos	Team	Pld	W	L	Pts	SW	SL	SR	SPW	SPL	SPR	Qualification
1	(Turkey) Fenerbahçe SK Istanbul	6	6	0	18	18	1	18.000	475	368	1.291	Playoff round
2	(Azerbaijan) Azerrail Baku	6	4	2	11	12	10	1.200	458	474	0.966	
3	(Poland) MKS Dąbrowa Górnicza	6	2	4	7	10	13	0.769	510	497	1.026	
4	(France) Saint-Raphaël Var VB	6	0	6	0	2	18	0.111	386	490	0.788	

Date	Time		Score		Set 1	Set 2	Set 3	Set 4	Set 5	Total	Report
15 Dec	18:00	Azerrail Baku (Azerbaijan)	3–1	(Poland) MKS Dąbrowa Górnicza	25–21	15–25	25–22	28–26		93–94	Report
15 Dec	20:30	Saint-Raphaël Var VB (France)	0–3	(Turkey) Fenerbahçe SK Istanbul	23–25	21–25	19–25			63–75	Report
10 Jan	20:30	Saint-Raphaël Var VB (France)	1–3	(Poland) MKS Dąbrowa Górnicza	18–25	15–25	25–20	22–25		80–95	Report
11 Jan	19:00	Fenerbahçe SK Istanbul (Turkey)	3–0	(Azerbaijan) Azerrail Baku	25–12	25–19	25–9			75–40	Report
25 Jan	20:30	MKS Dąbrowa Górnicza (Poland)	1–3	(Turkey) Fenerbahçe SK Istanbul	23–25	19–25	25–22	14–25		81–97	Report
25 Jan	20:30	Saint-Raphaël Var VB (France)	1–3	(Azerbaijan) Azerrail Baku	16–25	21–25	25–18	20–25		82–93	Report
8 Feb	19:30	Fenerbahçe SK Istanbul (Turkey)	3–0	(Poland) MKS Dąbrowa Górnicza	25–15	25–20	26–24			76–59	Report
9 Feb	18:00	Azerrail Baku (Azerbaijan)	3–0	(France) Saint-Raphaël Var VB	25–20	25–11	25–11			75–42	Report
22 Feb	18:00	MKS Dąbrowa Górnicza (Poland)	3–0	(France) Saint-Raphaël Var VB	25–19	25–17	25–15			75–51	Report
23 Feb	18:00	Azerrail Baku (Azerbaijan)	0–3	(Turkey) Fenerbahçe SK Istanbul	19–25	16–25	22–25			57–75	Report
28 Feb	18:00	MKS Dąbrowa Górnicza (Poland)	2–3	(Azerbaijan) Azerrail Baku	24–26	25–16	22–25	25–18	10–15	106–100	Report
28 Feb	19:30	Fenerbahçe SK Istanbul (Turkey)	3–0	(France) Saint-Raphaël Var VB	27–25	25–22	25–21			77–68	Report

=== Pool D ===
Pos	Team	Pld	W	L	Pts	SW	SL	SR	SPW	SPL	SPR	Qualification
1	(Turkey) VakıfBank Istanbul	6	6	0	17	18	5	3.600	545	415	1.313	Playoff round
2	(Turkey) Eczacıbaşı VitrA Istanbul	6	4	2	13	15	8	1.875	524	473	1.108	Playoff round
3	(Russia) Uralochka-NTMK Ekaterinburg	6	1	5	3	7	16	0.438	477	544	0.877	
4	(Germany) Dresdner SC	6	1	5	3	5	16	0.313	382	496	0.770	

Date	Time		Score		Set 1	Set 2	Set 3	Set 4	Set 5	Total	Report
14 Dec	19:00	VakıfBank Istanbul (Turkey)	3–1	(Russia) Uralochka-NTMK Ekaterinburg	18–25	25–20	25–16	25–13		93–74	Report
14 Dec	19:00	Dresdner SC (Germany)	0–3	(Turkey) Eczacıbaşı VitrA Istanbul	17–25	11–25	21–25			49–75	Report
10 Jan	17:00	Eczacıbaşı VitrA Istanbul (Turkey)	2–3	(Turkey) VakıfBank Istanbul	21–25	21–25	25–21	25–20	10–15	102–106	Report
10 Jan	19:00	Uralochka-NTMK Ekaterinburg (Russia)	3–1	(Germany) Dresdner SC	16–25	25–17	25–20	25–16		91–78	Report
24 Jan	19:00	Uralochka-NTMK Ekaterinburg (Russia)	0–3	(Turkey) Eczacıbaşı VitrA Istanbul	11–25	24–26	24–26			59–77	Report
25 Jan	19:00	VakıfBank Istanbul (Turkey)	3–0	(Germany) Dresdner SC	25–12	25–16	25–11			75–39	Report
8 Feb	16:30	Eczacıbaşı VitrA Istanbul (Turkey)	3–1	(Russia) Uralochka-NTMK Ekaterinburg	25–16	26–24	25–27	25–16		101–83	Report
8 Feb	19:00	Dresdner SC (Germany)	0–3	(Turkey) VakıfBank Istanbul	18–25	11–25	12–25			41–75	Report
22 Feb	19:00	VakıfBank Istanbul (Turkey)	3–1	(Turkey) Eczacıbaşı VitrA Istanbul	25–21	25–14	21–25	25–15		96–75	Report
22 Feb	19:00	Dresdner SC (Germany)	3–1	(Russia) Uralochka-NTMK Ekaterinburg	25–22	25–20	20–25	25–19		95–86	Report
28 Feb	16:30	Eczacıbaşı VitrA Istanbul (Turkey)	3–1	(Germany) Dresdner SC	25–15	19–25	25–22	25–18		94–80	Report
28 Feb	19:00	Uralochka-NTMK Ekaterinburg (Russia)	1–3	(Turkey) VakıfBank Istanbul	19–25	27–25	20–25	18–25		84–100	Report

== Playoffs ==
- Drawing of lots was held in Luxembourg City, Luxembourg on 3 March 2017.
- All times are local.

=== Playoff 6 ===
Team 1	Agg.	Team 2	1st leg	2nd leg
Eczacıbaşı VitrA Istanbul (Turkey)	4–2	(Turkey) Fenerbahçe SK Istanbul	2–3	3–1
Voléro Zürich (Switzerland)	0–6	(Turkey) VakıfBank Istanbul	1–3	1–3
Liu Jo Nordmeccanica Modena (Italy)	0–6	(Russia) Dinamo Moscow	0–3	0–3

==== First leg ====
Date	Time		Score		Set 1	Set 2	Set 3	Set 4	Set 5	Total	Report
22 Mar	20:30	Liu Jo Nordmeccanica Modena (Italy)	0–3	(Russia) Dinamo Moscow	22–25	13–25	13–25			48–75	Report
23 Mar	18:00	Eczacıbaşı VitrA Istanbul (Turkey)	2–3	(Turkey) Fenerbahçe SK Istanbul	25–16	22–25	19–25	25–21	12–15	103–102	Report
23 Mar	20:00	Voléro Zürich (Switzerland)	1–3	(Turkey) VakıfBank Istanbul	25–15	20–25	17–25	21–25		83–90	Report

==== Second leg ====
Date	Time		Score		Set 1	Set 2	Set 3	Set 4	Set 5	Total	Report
4 Apr	19:00	Fenerbahçe SK Istanbul (Turkey)	1–3	(Turkey) Eczacıbaşı VitrA Istanbul	31–29	14–25	25–27	23–25		93–106	Report
5 Apr	19:00	VakıfBank Istanbul (Turkey)	3–1	(Switzerland) Voléro Zürich	22–25	25–21	25–16	25–22		97–84	Report
5 Apr	19:00	Dinamo Moscow (Russia)	3–0	(Italy) Liu Jo Nordmeccanica Modena	25–20	25–19	25–21			75–60	Report

== Final four ==
- Organizer: (Italy) Imoco Volley Conegliano
- Venue: PalaVerde, Treviso, Italy
- All times are Central European Summer Time (UTC+02:00).
- In case that two teams from the same country qualify for the semifinals, they will have to play each other.

Semifinals
22 April
(Russia) Dinamo Moscow	1
(Italy) Imoco Volley Conegliano	3
22 April
(Turkey) VakıfBank Istanbul	3
(Turkey) Eczacıbaşı VitrA Istanbul	0

Final
23 April
(Italy) Imoco Volley Conegliano	0
(Turkey) VakıfBank Istanbul	3
3rd place match
23 April
(Russia) Dinamo Moscow	1
(Turkey) Eczacıbaşı VitrA Istanbul	3

=== Semifinals ===
Date	Time		Score		Set 1	Set 2	Set 3	Set 4	Set 5	Total	Report
22 Apr	17:00	VakıfBank Istanbul (Turkey)	3–0	(Turkey) Eczacıbaşı VitrA Istanbul	25–20	26–24	25–22			76–66	Report
22 Apr	20:00	Dinamo Moscow (Russia)	1–3	(Italy) Imoco Volley Conegliano	18–25	15–25	25–15	25–27		83–92	Report

=== 3rd place match ===
Date	Time		Score		Set 1	Set 2	Set 3	Set 4	Set 5	Total	Report
23 Apr	15:00	Dinamo Moscow (Russia)	1–3	(Turkey) Eczacıbaşı VitrA Istanbul	19–25	25–19	23–25	22–25		89–94	Report

=== Final ===
Date	Time		Score		Set 1	Set 2	Set 3	Set 4	Set 5	Total	Report
23 Apr	18:00	Imoco Volley Conegliano (Italy)	0–3	(Turkey) VakıfBank Istanbul	19–25	13–25	23–25			55–75	Report

== Final standing ==
Rank	Team
1st place, gold medalist(s)	(Turkey) VakıfBank Istanbul (C)
2nd place, silver medalist(s)	(Italy) Imoco Volley Conegliano
3rd place, bronze medalist(s)	(Turkey) Eczacıbaşı VitrA Istanbul
4	(Russia) Dinamo Moscow
5	(Switzerland) Voléro Zürich
5	(Turkey) Fenerbahçe SK Istanbul
5	(Italy) Liu Jo Nordmeccanica Modena
8	(Azerbaijan) Azerrail Baku
9	(Poland) Chemik Police
9	(Russia) Dinamo Krasnodar
9	(Poland) MKS Dąbrowa Górnicza
9	(Russia) Uralochka-NTMK Ekaterinburg
13	(Azerbaijan) Telekom Baku
13	(Romania) CS Volei Alba Blaj
13	(France) Saint-Raphaël Var VB
13	(Germany) Dresdner SC

(C)	Qualified for the 2017 FIVB Club World Championship

2016–17 Women's Club European Champions

3rd title

Roster for Final Four
Örge, Kırdar Sonsırma, Özbay, Zhu, Akman Çalışkan, Gürkaynak, ykaç, Slöetjes, Aydemir Akyol, Yurtdagülen, Durul, Hill, Rašić, Çetin
Head coach
Guidetti

== Awards ==
- Most valuable player
  (China) Zhu Ting (VakıfBank Istanbul)
- Best setter
  (Turkey) Naz Aydemir (VakıfBank Istanbul)
- Best outside spikers
  (United States) Kelsey Robinson (Imoco Volley Conegliano)
  (United States) Kimberly Hill (VakıfBank Istanbul)
- Best middle blockers
  (Serbia) Milena Rasic (VakıfBank Istanbul)
  (United States) Rachael Adams (Eczacıbaşı VitrA)
- Best opposite spiker
  (Netherlands) Lonneke Sloetjes (VakıfBank Istanbul)
- Best libero
  (Italy) Monica De Gennaro (Imoco Volley Conegliano)
