= Valentina Diouf =

Italian professional volleyball player

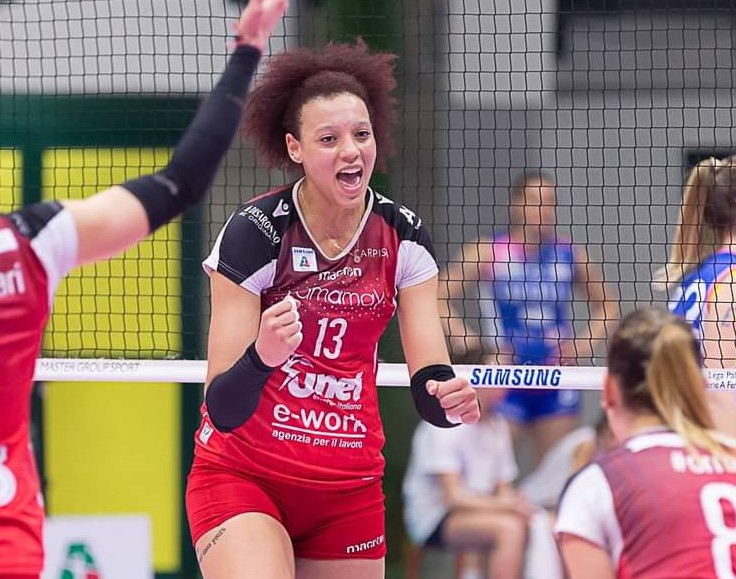
- Diouf with Bergamo in 2012

Personal information
- Born: January 10, 1993 (age 33) Milan, Italy
- Height: 2.02 m (6 ft 7 1/2 in)
- Weight: 89 kg (196 lb)
- Spike: 320 cm (130 in)
- Block: 303 cm (119 in)

Volleyball information
- Position: Opposite
- Current club: ŁKS Commercecon Łódź
Honours
Women's volleyball
Representing Italy
U20 World Championship
Gold medal – first place	2011 Perú	Team
Mediterranean Games
Gold medal – first place	2013 Turkey	Team

Valentina Diouf (born 10 January 1993) is an Italian professional volleyball player who played with her national team at the 2014 World Championship.

== Life ==
Diouf was born in Milan, to a father from Senegal and a mother from Italy.

== Career ==
Diouf played with her national team at the 2014 World Championship. There her team ended up in fourth place after losing 2–3 to Brazil the bronze medal match.

== Clubs ==
- (Italy) Club Italia (2008–2011)
- (Italy) Volley Bergamo (2011–2014)
- (Italy) Busto Arsizio (2014–2015)
- (Italy) LJ Modena (2015–2016)
- (Italy) Busto Arsizio (2016–2018)
- (Brazil) SESI Vôlei Bauru (2018–2019)
- (South Korea) Daejeon KGC (2019–2021)
- (Italy) Wealth Planet Perugia Volley (2021–2022)
- (Poland) ŁKS Commercecon Łódź (2022–2023)
- (France) ASPTT Mulhouse (2024)
- (Indonesia) Jakarta Elektrik PLN (2025–)

== Awards ==
=== Individuals ===
- 2014-15 CEV Champions League "Best opposite spiker"
- 2016–17 CEV Cup "MVP"

=== Clubs ===
- 2011 Italian Supercup – Champions, with Volley Bergamo
- 2014 Italian Cup – Runner-Up, with Busto Arsizio
- 2014–15 CEV Champions League – Runner-Up, with Busto Arsizio
- 2016–17 CEV Cup – Runner-Up, with Busto Arsizio
- 2018 São Paulo State Championship – Champions, with Vôlei Bauru
