= 2017–18 CEV Women's Champions League =

- League: CEV Women's Champions League
- Sport: Volleyball
- Duration: Qualifying round: 17 October – 11 November 2017; Main tournament: 12 December 2017 – 6 May 2018
- Number of teams: 26 (14 qual. + 12 main tourn.)

Finals
- Champions: (Turkey) VakıfBank Istanbul (4th title)
- Runners-up: (Romania) CSM Volei Alba Blaj
- Finals MVP: (Turkey) Gözde Kırdar Sonsırma

CEV Women's Champions League seasons
- ← 2016–17 2018–19 →

The CEV Champions League was the highest level of European club volleyball in the 2017–18 season and the 58th edition. The Turkish club VakıfBank Istanbul won its fourth overall and second consecutive title. The Romanian club CSM Volei Alba Blaj won the silver medal and Italian Imoco Volley Conegliano claimed the bronze medal. The Turkish Gözde Kırdar Sonsırma from VakıfBank Istanbul, who will retire, was awarded Most Valuable Player.

== Qualification ==
A total of 16 team participate of the main competition, with 12 teams being allocated direct vacancies on the basis of ranking list for European Cup Competitions and 4 teams qualified from the qualification rounds. Drawing of lots was held in Moscow, Russia on 17 November 2017.

Rank	Country	No. teams			Qualified teams
Rank	Country	Vac	Qual	Total	Qualified teams
1	Turkey	2	1	3	Fenerbahçe SK Istanbul
1	Turkey	2	1	3	Galatasaray SK Istanbul
1	Turkey	2	1	3	Vakıfbank Istanbul^{1}
2	Russia	2	-	2	Dinamo Kazan
2	Russia	2	-	2	Dinamo Moscow
3	Poland	2	1	3	Chemik Police
3	Poland	2	1	3	Grot Budowlani Łódź
3	Poland	2	1	3	Developres SkyRes Rzeszów^{1}
6	Switzerland	1	-	1	Voléro Zürich
7	Italy	1	1	2	Igor Gorgonzola Novara
7	Italy	1	1	2	Imoco Volley Conegliano^{1}
8	France	1	-	1	ASPTT Mulhouse
9	Romania	1	-	1	CSM Volei Alba Blaj
10	Czech Republic	1	-	1	Agel Prostějov
11	Serbia	1	-	1	Vizura Ruma
28	Bulgaria	-	1	1	Maritza Plovdiv^{1}

1. Team qualified via Champions League qualification.

== Format ==
League round

A round-robin format (each team plays every other team in its pool twice, once home and once away) where the 16 participating teams are drawn into 4 pools of 4 teams each.
The four pool winners and the best two second placed teams among all pools qualify for the Playoffs.
The organizer of the Final Four is determined at the conclusion League Round and qualify directly for the Final Four.

The standings is determined by the number of matches won. In case of a tie in the number of matches won by two or more teams, their ranking is based on the following criteria:

- result points (points awarded for results: 3 points for 3–0 or 3–1 wins, 2 points for 3–2 win, 1 point for 2–3 loss);
- set quotient (the number of total sets won divided by the number of total sets lost);
- points quotient (the number of total points scored divided by the number of total points lost);
- results of head-to-head matches between the teams in question.

Playoffs

A knockout format where the 6 qualified teams are each draw into one of the 3 matches with each match consisting of two legs (home and away).
Result points are awarded for each leg (3 points for 3–0 or 3–1 wins, 2 points for 3–2 win, 1 point for 2–3 loss). After two legs, the team with the most result points advances to the Final Four. In case the teams are tied after two legs, a Golden Set is played immediately at the completion of the second leg. The Golden Set winner is the team that first obtains 15 points, provided that the points difference between the two teams is at least 2 points (thus, the Golden Set is similar to a tiebreak set in a normal match).

Final Four

A single-elimination format where the three winners of the Playoffs are joined by the Final Four hosts and draw to play the semifinals (winners advance to the final and losers to the 3rd place match). In case two teams from the same country qualify for the semifinals, they will play each other.

== Pools composition ==
- Drawing of lots was held on 17 November 2017 in Moscow, Russia.

Pool A	Pool B	Pool C	Pool D
Voléro Zürich	Fenerbahçe SK Istanbul	Chemik Police	Dinamo Moscow
ASPTT Mulhouse	Igor Gorgonzola Novara	Dinamo Kazan	Galatasaray SK Istanbul
CSM Volei Alba Blaj	Agel Prostějov	Vizura Ruma	Grot Budowlani Łódź
Developres SkyRes Rzeszów	Imoco Volley Conegliano	Maritza Plovdiv	VakıfBank Istanbul

== League round ==
- All times are local.

=== Pool A ===
Pos	Team	Pld	W	L	Pts	SW	SL	SR	SPW	SPL	SPR	Qualification
1	(Romania) CSM Volei Alba Blaj (Note: Qualified as hosts) (H)	6	5	1	14	15	8	1.875	516	488	1.057	Final round
2	(Switzerland) Voléro Zürich	6	4	2	13	15	8	1.875	531	488	1.088	Playoff round
3	(Poland) Developres SkyRes Rzeszów	6	2	4	6	8	14	0.571	463	494	0.937	
4	(France) ASPTT Mulhouse	6	1	5	3	9	17	0.529	545	586	0.930	

(H) Host
Notes:

Date	Time		Score		Set 1	Set 2	Set 3	Set 4	Set 5	Total	Report
13 Dec	18:00	CSM Volei Alba Blaj (Romania)	3–1	(Switzerland) Voléro Zürich	26–24	25–22	24–26	25–21		100–93	Report
13 Dec	18:00	Developres SkyRes Rzeszów (Poland)	3–1	(France) ASPTT Mulhouse	25–18	20–25	25–14	25–17		95–74	Report
11 Jan	18:00	Developres SkyRes Rzeszów (Poland)	0–3	(Romania) CSM Volei Alba Blaj	19–25	25–27	17–25			61–77	Report
11 Jan	20:00	Voléro Zürich (Switzerland)	2–3	(France) ASPTT Mulhouse	19–25	19–25	25–23	25–23	10–15	98–111	Report
24 Jan	20:00	ASPTT Mulhouse (France)	1–3	(Romania) CSM Volei Alba Blaj	20–25	25–20	16–25	20–25		81–95	Report
25 Jan	20:00	Voléro Zürich (Switzerland)	3–0	(Poland) Developres SkyRes Rzeszów	26–24	25–19	25–13			76–56	Report
7 Feb	18:00	CSM Volei Alba Blaj (Romania)	3–2	(France) ASPTT Mulhouse	15–25	25–21	20–25	28–26	15–13	103–110	Report
7 Feb	18:00	Developres SkyRes Rzeszów (Poland)	1–3	(Switzerland) Voléro Zürich	16–25	25–18	22–25	22–25		85–93	Report
21 Feb	20:00	ASPTT Mulhouse (France)	1–3	(Switzerland) Voléro Zürich	24–26	25–20	22–25	19–25		90–96	Report
22 Feb	18:00	CSM Volei Alba Blaj (Romania)	3–1	(Poland) Developres SkyRes Rzeszów	25–16	25–16	20–25	25–12		95–69	Report
27 Feb	20:00	Voléro Zürich (Switzerland)	3–0	(Romania) CSM Volei Alba Blaj	25–22	25–15	25–9			75–46	Report
27 Feb	20:00	ASPTT Mulhouse (France)	1–3	(Poland) Developres SkyRes Rzeszów	23–25	14–25	25–23	17–25		79–98	Report

=== Pool B ===
Pos	Team	Pld	W	L	Pts	SW	SL	SR	SPW	SPL	SPR	Qualification
1	(Italy) Igor Gorgonzola Novara	6	5	1	14	16	7	2.286	528	447	1.181	Playoff round
2	(Italy) Imoco Volley Conegliano	6	5	1	13	16	9	1.778	564	496	1.137	Playoff round
3	(Turkey) Fenerbahçe SK Istanbul	6	2	4	9	12	14	0.857	540	547	0.987	
4	(Czech Republic) Agel Prostějov	6	0	6	0	4	18	0.222	395	537	0.736	

Date	Time		Score		Set 1	Set 2	Set 3	Set 4	Set 5	Total	Report
12 Dec	17:30	Agel Prostějov (Czech Republic)	1–3	(Turkey) Fenerbahçe SK Istanbul	25–20	14–25	19–25	21–25		79–95	Report
13 Dec	20:35	Imoco Volley Conegliano (Italy)	3–1	(Italy) Igor Gorgonzola Novara	25–13	25–18	20–25	25–14		95–70	Report
10 Jan	20:30	Imoco Volley Conegliano (Italy)	3–1	(Czech Republic) Agel Prostějov	25–14	21–25	25–16	25–17		96–72	Report
11 Jan	19:00	Fenerbahçe SK Istanbul (Turkey)	2–3	(Italy) Igor Gorgonzola Novara	26–24	25–19	22–25	19–25	6–15	98–108	Report
25 Jan	19:00	Fenerbahçe SK Istanbul (Turkey)	2–3	(Italy) Imoco Volley Conegliano	25–21	27–25	15–25	17–25	10–15	94–111	Report
25 Jan	20:30	Igor Gorgonzola Novara (Italy)	3–1	(Czech Republic) Agel Prostějov	25–12	25–13	22–25	25–14		97–64	Report
7 Feb	17:00	Agel Prostějov (Czech Republic)	0–3	(Italy) Igor Gorgonzola Novara	24–26	13–25	15–25			52–76	Report
7 Feb	20:30	Imoco Volley Conegliano (Italy)	3–2	(Turkey) Fenerbahçe SK Istanbul	20–25	18–25	25–18	25–22	15–11	103–101	Report
21 Feb	17:00	Agel Prostějov (Czech Republic)	0–3	(Italy) Imoco Volley Conegliano	21–25	21–25	15–25			57–75	Report
22 Feb	20:30	Igor Gorgonzola Novara (Italy)	3–0	(Turkey) Fenerbahçe SK Istanbul	25–23	25–18	25–13			75–54	Report
27 Feb	17:00	Fenerbahçe SK Istanbul (Turkey)	3–1	(Czech Republic) Agel Prostějov	25–23	23–25	25–13	25–10		98–71	Report
27 Feb	20:30	Igor Gorgonzola Novara (Italy)	3–1	(Italy) Imoco Volley Conegliano	25–16	29–27	23–25	25–16		102–84	Report

=== Pool C ===
Pos	Team	Pld	W	L	Pts	SW	SL	SR	SPW	SPL	SPR	Qualification
1	(Russia) Dinamo Kazan	6	6	0	18	18	2	9.000	495	367	1.349	Playoff round
2	(Poland) Chemik Police	6	4	2	10	13	10	1.300	502	487	1.031	
3	(Serbia) Vizura Ruma	6	2	4	7	8	13	0.615	431	463	0.931	
4	(Bulgaria) Maritza Plovdiv	6	0	6	1	4	18	0.222	414	525	0.789	

Date	Time		Score		Set 1	Set 2	Set 3	Set 4	Set 5	Total	Report
12 Dec	18:00	Vizura Ruma (Serbia)	0–3	(Poland) Chemik Police	17–25	21–25	14–25			52–75	Report
13 Dec	18:30	Maritza Plovdiv (Bulgaria)	0–3	(Russia) Dinamo Kazan	19–25	23–25	23–25			65–75	Report
10 Jan	18:00	Chemik Police (Poland)	0–3	(Russia) Dinamo Kazan	17–25	20–25	19–25			56–75	Report
11 Jan	18:30	Maritza Plovdiv (Bulgaria)	1–3	(Serbia) Vizura Ruma	17–25	25–22	17–25	13–25		72–97	Report
24 Jan	18:00	Chemik Police (Poland)	3–0	(Bulgaria) Maritza Plovdiv	25–16	26–24	25–12			76–52	Report
25 Jan	19:00	Dinamo Kazan (Russia)	3–0	(Serbia) Vizura Ruma	25–18	25–23	25–11			75–52	Report
6 Feb	20:30	Vizura Ruma (Serbia)	0–3	(Russia) Dinamo Kazan	12–25	16–25	18–25			46–75	Report
8 Feb	18:30	Maritza Plovdiv (Bulgaria)	2–3	(Poland) Chemik Police	19–25	25–18	25–23	20–25	11–15	100–106	Report
20 Feb	20:30	Vizura Ruma (Serbia)	3–0	(Bulgaria) Maritza Plovdiv	25–23	25–19	25–14			75–56	Report
21 Feb	19:00	Dinamo Kazan (Russia)	3–1	(Poland) Chemik Police	24–26	25–16	25–23	25–14		99–79	Report
27 Feb	18:00	Chemik Police (Poland)	3–2	(Serbia) Vizura Ruma	22–25	25–23	19–25	25–19	19–17	110–109	Report
27 Feb	19:00	Dinamo Kazan (Russia)	3–1	(Bulgaria) Maritza Plovdiv	25–23	21–25	25–15	25–6		96–69	Report

=== Pool D ===
Pos	Team	Pld	W	L	Pts	SW	SL	SR	SPW	SPL	SPR	Qualification
1	(Turkey) VakıfBank Istanbul	6	6	0	17	18	5	3.600	554	453	1.223	Playoff round
2	(Turkey) Galatasaray SK Istanbul	6	4	2	12	14	9	1.556	536	482	1.112	Playoff round
3	(Russia) Dinamo Moscow	6	2	4	7	10	12	0.833	462	481	0.960	
4	(Poland) Grot Budowlani Łódź	6	0	6	0	2	18	0.111	351	487	0.721	

Date	Time		Score		Set 1	Set 2	Set 3	Set 4	Set 5	Total	Report
14 Dec	19:00	VakıfBank Istanbul (Turkey)	3–1	(Turkey) Galatasaray SK Istanbul	25–22	25–18	23–25	26–24		99–89	Report
21 Dec	20:00	Grot Budowlani Łódź (Poland)	0–3	(Russia) Dinamo Moscow	18–25	20–25	23–25			61–75	Report
9 Jan	19:00	Dinamo Moscow (Russia)	1–3	(Turkey) Galatasaray SK Istanbul	21–25	18–25	25–23	17–25		81–98	Report
10 Jan	19:00	VakıfBank Istanbul (Turkey)	3–1	(Poland) Grot Budowlani Łódź	25–16	24–26	25–15	25–16		99–73	Report
23 Jan	19:00	Galatasaray SK Istanbul (Turkey)	3–0	(Poland) Grot Budowlani Łódź	25–16	25–21	25–17			75–54	Report
24 Jan	19:00	Dinamo Moscow (Russia)	0–3	(Turkey) VakıfBank Istanbul	20–25	22–25	18–25			60–75	Report
6 Feb	18:00	Grot Budowlani Łódź (Poland)	1–3	(Turkey) Galatasaray SK Istanbul	9–25	18–25	25–13	15–25		67–88	Report
8 Feb	19:00	VakıfBank Istanbul (Turkey)	3–2	(Russia) Dinamo Moscow	22–25	25–18	25–11	21–25	15–9	108–88	Report
20 Feb	19:00	Galatasaray SK Istanbul (Turkey)	3–1	(Russia) Dinamo Moscow	19–25	25–22	25–15	25–21		94–83	Report
20 Feb	20:00	Grot Budowlani Łódź (Poland)	0–3	(Turkey) VakıfBank Istanbul	13–25	22–25	16–25			51–75	Report
27 Feb	19:00	Dinamo Moscow (Russia)	3–0	(Poland) Grot Budowlani Łódź	25–12	25–13	25–20			75–45	Report
27 Feb	20:30	Galatasaray SK Istanbul (Turkey)	1–3	(Turkey) VakıfBank Istanbul	21–25	22–25	25–22	24–26		92–98	Report

== Playoffs ==
- Drawing of lots held in Luxembourg City, Luxembourg on 2 March 2018.

=== Playoff 6 ===
Team 1	Agg.	Team 2	1st leg	2nd leg
Voléro Zürich (Switzerland)	0–6	(Turkey) VakıfBank Istanbul	0–3	0–3
Imoco Volley Conegliano (Italy)	4–2	(Russia) Dinamo Kazan	3–0	2–3
Galatasaray SK Istanbul (Turkey)	4–2	(Italy) Igor Gorgonzola Novara	2–3	3–1

==== First leg ====
Date	Time		Score		Set 1	Set 2	Set 3	Set 4	Set 5	Total	Report
21 Mar	19:00	Galatasaray SK Istanbul (Turkey)	2–3	(Italy) Igor Gorgonzola Novara	21–25	25–7	25–16	21–25	10–15	102–88	Report
21 Mar	20:30	Imoco Volley Conegliano (Italy)	3–0	(Russia) Dinamo Kazan	25–19	25–18	25–17			75–54	Report
22 Mar	20:00	Voléro Zürich (Switzerland)	0–3	(Turkey) VakıfBank Istanbul	17–25	22–25	21–25			60–75	Report

==== Second leg ====
Date	Time		Score		Set 1	Set 2	Set 3	Set 4	Set 5	Total	Report
4 Apr	19:00	Dinamo Kazan (Russia)	3–2	(Italy) Imoco Volley Conegliano	25–15	21–25	20–25	25–17	15–13	106–95	Report
5 Apr	19:00	VakıfBank Istanbul (Turkey)	3–0	(Switzerland) Voléro Zürich	25–12	25–14	25–17			75–43	Report
5 Apr	20:30	Igor Gorgonzola Novara (Italy)	1–3	(Turkey) Galatasaray SK Istanbul	26–24	20–25	17–25	19–25		82–99	Report

== Final four ==
- Organizer: CSM Volei Alba Blaj
- Venue: Sala Polivalentă, Bucharest, Romania

Semifinals
5 May
(Italy) Imoco Volley Conegliano	2
(Turkey) VakıfBank Istanbul	3
5 May
(Romania) CSM Volei Alba Blaj	3
(Turkey) Galatasaray SK Istanbul	1

Final
6 May
(Romania) CSM Volei Alba Blaj	0
(Turkey) VakıfBank Istanbul	3
3rd place match
6 May
(Turkey) Galatasaray SK Istanbul	0
(Italy) Imoco Volley Conegliano	3

=== Semifinals ===
Date	Time		Score		Set 1	Set 2	Set 3	Set 4	Set 5	Total	Report
5 May	15:00	Imoco Volley Conegliano (Italy)	2–3	(Turkey) VakıfBank Istanbul	22–25	21–25	25–17	25–15	14–16	107–98	Report
5 May	18:00	CSM Volei Alba Blaj (Romania)	3–1	(Turkey) Galatasaray SK Istanbul	23–25	25–17	25–22	25–22		98–86	Report

=== 3rd place match ===
Date	Time		Score		Set 1	Set 2	Set 3	Set 4	Set 5	Total	Report
6 May	16:00	Galatasaray SK Istanbul (Turkey)	0–3	(Italy) Imoco Volley Conegliano	17–25	18–25	20–25			55–75	Report

=== Final ===
Date	Time		Score		Set 1	Set 2	Set 3	Set 4	Set 5	Total	Report
6 May	19:00	CSM Volei Alba Blaj (Romania)	0–3	(Turkey) VakıfBank Istanbul	17–25	11–25	17–25			45–75	Report

== Final standing ==
Rank	Team
1st place, gold medalist(s)	(Turkey) VakıfBank Istanbul
2nd place, silver medalist(s)	(Romania) CSM Volei Alba Blaj
3rd place, bronze medalist(s)	(Italy) Imoco Volley Conegliano
4	(Turkey) Galatasaray SK Istanbul
5	(Switzerland) Voléro Zürich
5	(Italy) Igor Gorgonzola Novara
5	(Russia) Dinamo Kazan
8	(Poland) Chemik Police
9	(Poland) Developres SkyRes Rzeszów
9	(Turkey) Fenerbahçe SK Istanbul
9	(Serbia) Vizura Ruma
9	(Russia) Dinamo Moscow
13	(France) ASPTT Mulhouse
13	(Bulgaria) Maritza Plovdiv
13	(Czech Republic) Agel Prostějov
13	(Poland) Grot Budowlani Łódź

(C)	Qualified for the 2018 FIVB Club World Championship

2017–18 Women's Club European Champions

VakıfBank Istanbul
4th title

Roster for Final Four
Örge, Kırdar Sonsırma, Özbay, Zhu, Akman Çalışkan, Robinson, Gürkaynak, Aykaç, Slöetjes, Aydemir Akyol, Karakurt, Rašić, Şenoğlu, Güneş
Head coach Guidetti

== Awards ==
- Most valuable player
  (Turkey) Gözde Kırdar Sonsırma (VakıfBank Istanbul)
- Best setter
  (Poland) Joanna Wołosz (Imoco Volley Conegliano)
- Best outside spikers
  (China) Zhu Ting (VakıfBank Istanbul)
  (United States) Kimberly Hill (Imoco Volley Conegliano)
- Best middle blockers
  (Serbia) Milena Rašić (VakıfBank Istanbul)
  (Romania) Nneka Onyejekwe (CSM Volei Alba Blaj)
- Best opposite spiker
  (Cuba) Ana Cleger (CSM Volei Alba Blaj)
- Best libero
  (Turkey) Hatice Gizem Örge (VakıfBank Istanbul)

== Record ==
On 6 May 2018, in the final game of the 2018 Champions League, VakıfBank Istanbul attained the record of the best score in a volleyball European cup final since the Rally Point System was adopted, with only 45 points lost. Consequently, CSM Volei Alba Blaj holds the record for the worst score.
