= KV Drita =

Volleyball club

- Full name: Klubi Vollejbollit Drita
- Short name: Drita
- Nickname: Intelektualet
- Founded: 1951; 75 years ago
- Ground: Sport Hall "Bashkim Selishta"
- Manager: Arben Bislimi (men's); Lorik Iliazi (women)
- League: Volleyball Superleague of Kosovo
- 2017-18: 1
- Website: Club home page
- Championships: Champion of Kosovo

Uniforms
Home	Away

KV Drita is a volleyball club based in Gjilan, Kosovo, founded in 1953. The club was formed on the initiative of the professors and students of a normal school led by Enver Gjinolli.

== Name ==
In its early years, the club was named "Partizani". In 1898, the name was changed to "Akademiku", and in 1977, after a merger with "Tekstil", the club became "Taftison". Finally, in 1990, the name was changed to "KV Drita" because all other Gjilan sports teams used this name.

== History ==
After uniting with the "Tekstil" the club became Kosovan champions in the 1980-81 season and ranked highly in the Sixth Federal League of Yugoslavia.

In 1982, Professor Hajrush Fazliu formed a club for women in Selami Hallaqi School in Gjilan, where coaches Hajrush Fazliu, Hafiz Gashi, Shaban Kastrati spotted talent to join KV "Taftison". Over time, they became the most successful volleyball club in Gjilan and Kosovo.

In 1989, events shut down competitions in Yugoslavia. In 1990 competition resumed. In 1997-98 the club was Kosovo champion.

The women's club was Kosovan champion in 1994, 1995 and 1996, and runner up in 1997.

=== After the Kosovo war ===
The men's club was reformed in 2004, and in 2005 and 2007 it was Kosovan champion and in 2009 it was runner-up.

In 2000/01 the women's club was Kosovan runner up. The women's club was Kosovan champion in 2001, 2008, 2009, 2011, 2013, 2014, 2015 and 2016.

== Honours ==
=== Men ===
==== Champions of Kosovo ====
1997-98, 1997-98 January Club

=== Women ===
==== Champions of Kosovo ====
1991-92, 1992–93, 1993–94, 1994–95, 1995–96, 1996–97, 1997–98, 2011–12, 2013–14, 20150-16, 2017–18

== Team roster ==
Women Team - Season 2017–2018, as of October 2018.

Number	Player	Position	Height (m)	Weight (kg)	Birth date
1	(Kosovo) Adelajda Iliazi	Outside-spiker	170	60	1991
1	(United States) Capri RICHARDSON	Middle-blocker	183	70	1993
2	(Kosovo) Elmira Asani	Libero	160	54	2000
3	(Kosovo) Brikena Dushica	Opposite	179	69	1999
4	(Kosovo) Olsa Syla	Middle-blocker	192	70	2001
6	(Kosovo) Blinera Jaha	Setter	172	71	1998
7	(Kosovo) Venera Kadriu	Opposite	177	60	2000
8	(Kosovo) Ronita Leka	Middle-blocker	180	60	1997
9	(Kosovo) Lorina Mehmeti	Outside-spiker	177	68	1999
10	(Brazil) Melissa ROMANO ORTEGA	Setter	177	65	1994
11	(Kosovo) Vlora Berisha	Middle Blocker	189	67	1984
12	(Kosovo) Fjolla Hyseni	Libero	170	60	1997
13	(Kosovo) Viola Latifi	Setter	175	68	2000
17	(Kosovo) Vesa Shabani	Middle-blocker	174	55	2001

== Personnel ==
Current technical staff
Position	Name
Head coach	(Kosovo) Lorik Ilazi
Assistant coach	(Kosovo) Valon Zymeri
Board members
Office	Name
President	(Kosovo) Jakup Shabani
Vice-President	(Kosovo) Florent Haziri
Secretary	(Kosovo) Idriz BERISHA
Board member	(Kosovo) Lorik Ilazi
Board member	(Kosovo) Vlora BERISHA
Board member	(Kosovo) Selver KAMBERI
Board member	(Kosovo) Enver SADIKU
Board member	(Kosovo) Arben BISLIMI
Board member	(Kosovo) Jakup DEMI

== See also ==
- 2016–17 CEV Women's Champions League
- Sport in Kosovo
