= 2016–17 Women's CEV Cup =

- League: Women's CEV Cup
- Sport: Volleyball
- Duration: 13 December 2016 – 15 April 2017
- Number of matches: 69
- Number of teams: 36

Finals
- Champions: (Russia) Dynamo Kazan (1st title)
- Runners-up: (Italy) Unet Yamamay Busto Arsizio
- Finals MVP: (Italy) Valentina Diouf

Women's CEV Cup seasons
- ← 2015–16 2017–18 →

The 2016–17 Women's CEV Cup was the 45th edition of the European CEV Cup volleyball club tournament, the former "Top Teams Cup".

== Format ==
The tournament was played on a knockout format, with 36 teams participating. Initially 22 teams were allocated vacancies to enter the competition, with 8 of them directly qualified to the 16th Finals on the basis of the latest CEV European Ranking List. 14 teams came from the CEV Women's Champions League qualification entering the competition at different stages (as per 'Round composition' below).

On 30 June 2016, a drawing of lots in Varna, Bulgaria, determined the team's pairing for each match. Each team plays a home and an away match with result points awarded for each leg (3 points for 3–0 or 3–1 wins, 2 points for 3–2 win, 1 point for 2–3 loss). After two legs, the team with the most result points advances to the next round. In case the teams are tied after two legs, a Golden Set is played immediately at the completion of the second leg. The Golden Set winner is the team that first obtains 15 points, provided that the points difference between the two teams is at least 2 points (thus, the Golden Set is similar to a tiebreak set in a normal match).

Round composition

- 32nd Final: 14 teams + 2 teams from Champions League
- 16th Final: 8 teams + 32nd Final winners (8 teams) + 8 teams from Champions League
- 8th Final: 16th Final winners (12 teams) + 4 teams from Champions League
- 4th Final onwards: winners

== Participating teams ==
- A total of 36 teams participate in the competition.
- Drawing of lots was held in Varna, Bulgaria on 30 June 2016.

Rank	Country	No. teams			Qualified teams
Rank	Country	Vac	Qual	Total	Qualified teams
1	Turkey	1	-	1	Galatasaray Daikin Istanbul^{1}
2	Russia	1	-	1	Dynamo Kazan^{1}
3	Poland	1	-	1	Budowlani Łódź^{1}
5	France	2	1	3	Beziers VB^{1}
5	France	2	1	3	RC Cannes^{4}
5	France	2	1	3	SF Paris Saint Cloud
6	Italy	2	-	2	Pomì Casalmaggiore^{1}
6	Italy	2	-	2	Unet Yamamay Busto Arsizio
7	Germany	2	-	2	Allianz MTV Stuttgart^{1}
7	Germany	2	-	2	Rote Raben Vilsbiburg
8	Switzerland	2	-	2	TS Volley Düdingen^{1}
8	Switzerland	2	-	2	VFM Franches-Montagnes
9	Romania	1	-	1	CSM Târgoviște^{1}
10	Czech Republic	1	1	2	Agel Prostějov^{4}
10	Czech Republic	1	1	2	VK UP Olomouc
11	Serbia	1	1	2	Jedinstvo Stara Pazova
11	Serbia	1	1	2	Vizura Beograd^{4}
12	Belgium	1	-	1	VDK Gent Dames
13	Finland	1	1	2	HPK Hämeenlinna^{3}
13	Finland	1	1	2	LP Viesti Salo
14	Ukraine	-	1	1	Khimik Yuzhny^{3}
15	Slovenia	1	1	2	Calcit Ljubljana^{3}
15	Slovenia	1	1	2	Nova KBM Branik Maribor
16	Greece	1	-	1	A.O. Thiras
17	Austria	1	-	1	VC Tirol Innsbruck
18	Netherlands	1	-	1	Eurosped Almelo
19	Israel	1	1	2	Hapoel Kfar Saba
19	Israel	1	1	2	Maccabi Haifa^{3}
20	Bosnia and Herzegovina	-	1	1	Bimal-Jedinstvo Brčko^{3}
22	Croatia	1	-	1	Mladost Zagreb
23	Belarus	-	1	1	Minchanka Minsk^{4}
24	Hungary	-	1	1	Linamar - Békéscsabai RSE^{3}
30	Bulgaria	-	1	1	Maritza Plovdiv^{3}
31	Montenegro	-	1	1	Luka Bar^{2}
34	Estonia	-	1	1	Kohila VC^{3}
35	Kosovo	-	1	1	Drita Gjilan^{2}

1. Team that received a 32nd Final bye.
2. Team that qualified via Champions League entering the 32nd Final.
3. Team that qualified via Champions League entering the 16th Final.
4. Team that qualified via Champions League entering the 8th Final.

== Main phase ==
=== 32nd Final ===
- 1st leg (Team #1 home) 13–15 December 2016
- 2nd leg (Team #2 home) 21–22 December 2016

Match#	Team #1	Results	Team #2
1	VFM Franches-Montagnes (Switzerland)	3 – 0; 3 – 0	(Kosovo) Drita Gjilan
2	VC Tirol Innsbruck (Austria)	3 – 1; 1 – 3 Golden Set: 10 – 15	(Montenegro) Luka Bar
3	Eurosped Almelo (Netherlands)	0 – 3; 0 – 3	(Czech Republic) VK UP Olomouc
4	Rote Raben Vilsbiburg (Germany)	3 – 1; 0 – 3 Golden Set: 16 – 18	(Serbia) Jedinstvo Stara Pazova
5	Unet Yamamay Busto Arsizio (Italy)	3 – 1; 3 – 0	(Belgium) VDK Gent Dames
6	Mladost Zagreb (Croatia)	0 – 3; 0 – 3	(Finland) LP Viesti Salo
7	SF Paris Saint Cloud (France)	0 – 3; 1 – 3	(Slovenia) Nova KBM Branik Maribor
8	Hapoel Kfar Saba (Israel)	3 – 0; 3 – 2	(Greece) A.O. Thiras

=== 16th Final ===
- 1st leg (Team #1 home) 11–12 January 2017
- 2nd leg (Team #2 home) 24–26 January 2017

Match#	Team #1	Results	Team #2
9	LP Viesti Salo (Finland)	0 – 3; 0 – 3	(Finland) HPK Hämeenlinna
10	Unet Yamamay Busto Arsizio (Italy)	3 – 1; 2 – 3	(Bulgaria) Maritza Plovdiv
11	Jedinstvo Stara Pazova (Serbia)	1 – 3; 2 – 3	(Hungary) Linamar - Békéscsabai RSE
12	Pomì Casalmaggiore (Italy)	3 – 0; 3 – 0	(Israel) Maccabi Haifa
13	Nova KBM Branik Maribor (Slovenia)	3 – 1; 3 – 0	(Slovenia) Calcit Ljubljana
14	Hapoel Kfar Saba (Israel)	3 – 0; 1 – 3 Golden Set: 8 – 15	(Bosnia and Herzegovina) Bimal-Jedinstvo Brčko
15	Allianz MTV Stuttgart (Germany)	3 – 0; 3 – 0	(Estonia) Kohila VC
16	CSM Târgoviște (Romania)	2 – 3; 2 – 3	(Ukraine) Khimik Yuzhny
17	VFM Franches-Montagnes (Switzerland)	1 – 3; 0 – 3	(Turkey) Galatasaray Daikin Istanbul
18	VK UP Olomouc (Czech Republic)	0 – 3; 0 – 3	(Russia) Dynamo Kazan
19	Luka Bar (Montenegro)	0 – 3; 0 – 3	(Poland) Budowlani Łódź
20	TS Volley Düdingen (Switzerland)	1 – 3; 0 – 3	(France) Beziers VB

=== 8th Final ===
- 1st leg (Team #1 home) 7–8 February 2017
- 2nd leg (Team #2 home) 21–23 February 2017

Match#	Team #1	Results	Team #2
21	Linamar - Békéscsabai RSE (Hungary)	3 – 1; 3 – 1	(France) Beziers VB
22	Unet Yamamay Busto Arsizio (Italy)	3 – 0; 2 – 3	(Belarus) Minchanka Minsk
23	Pomì Casalmaggiore (Italy)	3 – 0; 3 – 2	(Finland) HPK Hämeenlinna
24	Allianz MTV Stuttgart (Germany)	3 – 0; 3 – 2	(Czech Republic) Agel Prostějov
25	Galatasaray Daikin Istanbul (Turkey)	3 – 0; 2 – 3	(Slovenia) Nova KBM Branik Maribor
26	Budowlani Łódź (Poland)	3 – 0; 2 – 3	(France) RC Cannes
27	Dynamo Kazan (Russia)	3 – 0; 3 – 0	(Bosnia and Herzegovina) Bimal-Jedinstvo Brčko
28*	Khimik Yuzhny (Ukraine)	2 – 3	(Serbia) Vizura Beograd

*Note: A first leg, originally scheduled on 7 February 2017, did not take place as Vizura did not turn up for the match. Serbian press reported the Vizura team flight from Istanbul to Odesa had two aborted landing attempts due to bad weather (thick fog) before returning to Istanbul. The CEV with both clubs consent, decided a single match in a neutral venue (Brčko in Bosnia and Herzegovina) played behind closed doors as the way to determine the team advancing in the competition.

=== 4th Final ===
- 1st leg (Team #1 home) 7–8 March 2017
- 2nd leg (Team #2 home) 15–16 March 2017

Match#	Team #1	Results	Team #2
29	Linamar - Békéscsabai RSE (Hungary)	1 – 3; 0 – 3	(Italy) Unet Yamamay Busto Arsizio
30	Allianz MTV Stuttgart (Germany)	2 – 3; 0 – 3	(Italy) Pomì Casalmaggiore
31	Galatasaray Daikin Istanbul (Turkey)	3 – 1; 3 – 0	(Poland) Budowlani Łódź
32	Dynamo Kazan (Russia)	3 – 0; 3 – 0	(Serbia) Vizura Beograd

== Final phase ==
=== Semifinals ===
- 1st leg (Team #1 home) 28 March 2017
- 2nd leg (Team #2 home) 1–2 April 2017

Match#	Team #1	Results	Team #2
33	Pomì Casalmaggiore (Italy)	0 – 3; 2 – 3	(Italy) Unet Yamamay Busto Arsizio
34	Galatasaray Daikin Istanbul (Turkey)	3 – 0; 0 – 3 Golden Set: 11 – 15	(Russia) Dynamo Kazan

=== Final ===
- 1st leg (Team #1 home) 11 April 2017
- 2nd leg (Team #2 home) 15 April 2017

Match#	Team #1	Results	Team #2
35	Dynamo Kazan (Russia)	3 – 1; 3 – 2	(Italy) Unet Yamamay Busto Arsizio

2016–17 Women's CEV Cup Champions

Dynamo Kazan
1st title

== Awards ==
Award	Winner	Team
MVP	(Italy) Valentina Diouf	Unet Yamamay Busto Arsizio
