= Dresdner SC (volleyball) =

German women's volleyball team

- Full name: Dresdner Sportclub 1898
- Short name: DSC
- Founded: 1990
- Association: Deutscher Volleyball-Verband
- League: German Women's Volleyball League
- Location: Magdeburger Straße 12; 01067 Dresden
- Arena: Margon Arena
- Chairman: Jörg Dittrich
- Head coach: Alexander Waibl
- Championships: Champions 1999, 2007, 2014, 2015, 2016, 2021; DVV Cup 1999, 2002, 2010, 2016, 2018, 2020; Challenge Cup 2010, 3. Platz 2008
- Website: dresdnersportclub.de

The volleyball department of the Dresdner Sportclub was founded in 1990. The women's team plays in the Bundesliga and has been German champion six times, DVV-Pokal cup winner six times and Challenge Cup winner at European level once.

As of 2021, current players include Jocelynn Birks, Jenna Gray, Madeleine Gates and Swiss international Maja Storck.

== Bundesliga ==
The Dresden women have been playing in the 1. Bundesliga since 1997. In 1999 they became German champions for the first time. In the 2007 season they were able to win the title again. In the 2007/08 season they were runner-up. In the 2008/09 season they reached third place and fourth place in 2010. In 2011, 2012 and 2013, the Dresden women were only runners up to Schweriner SC. In the 2013/14 season, the team celebrated their third championship title with three wins in the championship final against the Rote Raben Vilsbiburg. In the 2014/15 season, the Dresden women won the fourth championship title with three victories in the championship final against Allianz MTV Stuttgart. In the following season they defended the title after five finals against the same opponent. In the 2020/21 season, the Dresden women were again in the play-off final against Stuttgart. After the first two games of the best-of-five series were lost, Dresden won the remaining games and secured the championship title again.

== Margon Arena ==
Dresdnen plays its home games in the multifunctional sports hall "Margon Arena". It was opened in 1998. Since 2007 it has had its current name in honor of its main sponsor - the company "Margon Brunnen GmbH". The capacity is 3,000 spectators. It also serves as the home for the Dresden Titans basketball team and is a concert and cultural venue.

== Players ==
- Marta Levinska
- Lorena Lorber Fijok
- Martina Utla
- Eva Zatkovič
- Dominika Strumilo
- Nathalie Lemmens
- Viktoria Demidova
