= 2017–18 CEV Women's Champions League squads =

This article shows the rosters of all participating teams at the 2017–18 CEV Women's Champions League in several countries.

== Pool A ==
=== ASPTT Mulhouse ===
The following is the roster of the France club ASPTT Mulhouse in the 2017–18 CEV Women's Champions League.

Head coach: (France) Magali Magail

No.	Name	Date of birth	Height	Weight	Spike	Block	Position
1	(Serbia) Bojana Marković	20 June 1990 (age 34)	1.78 m (5 ft 10 in)	67 kg (148 lb)	292 cm (115 in)	282 cm (111 in)	Outside-spiker
2	(United States) Alexa Marie Dannemiller	9 June 1993 (age 31)	1.80 m (5 ft 11 in)	74 kg (163 lb)	296 cm (117 in)	289 cm (114 in)	Setter
3	(Ukraine) Olga Trach	28 March 1984 (age 40)	1.88 m (6 ft 2 in)	65 kg (143 lb)	300 cm (120 in)	282 cm (111 in)	Middle-blocker
4	(Belgium) Britt Herbots	24 November 1999 (age 25)	1.82 m (6 ft 0 in)	66 kg (146 lb)	310 cm (120 in)	290 cm (110 in)	Outside-spiker
5	(United Kingdom) Ciara Michel	7 February 1985 (age 40)	1.95 m (6 ft 5 in)	71 kg (157 lb)	318 cm (125 in)	294 cm (116 in)	Middle-blocker
6	(France) Manon Jaegy	25 October 2001 (age 23)	1.61 m (5 ft 3 in)	47 kg (104 lb)	238 cm (94 in)	228 cm (90 in)	Libero
7	(Belgium) Aziliz Divoux	3 January 1995 (age 30)	1.83 m (6 ft 0 in)	68 kg (150 lb)	293 cm (115 in)	278 cm (109 in)	Setter
8	(France) Lisa Jeanpierre	28 July 1999 (age 25)	1.83 m (6 ft 0 in)	72 kg (159 lb)	304 cm (120 in)	286 cm (113 in)	Outside-spiker
9	(France) Léa Soldner	10 February 1996 (age 29)	1.74 m (5 ft 9 in)	71 kg (157 lb)	271 cm (107 in)	254 cm (100 in)	Libero
10	(United States) Hayley Spelman	11 June 1991 (age 33)	2.03 m (6 ft 8 in)	78 kg (172 lb)	321 cm (126 in)	297 cm (117 in)	Opposite
11	(Slovakia) Michaela Abrhámová	31 August 1993 (age 31)	1.88 m (6 ft 2 in)	85 kg (187 lb)	299 cm (118 in)	287 cm (113 in)	Middle-blocker
12	(Montenegro) Katarina Budrak	5 February 1998 (age 27)	1.95 m (6 ft 5 in)	82 kg (181 lb)	309 cm (122 in)	294 cm (116 in)	Outside-spiker
13	(France) Lara Davidović	13 December 1997 (age 27)	1.84 m (6 ft 0 in)	74 kg (163 lb)	304 cm (120 in)	285 cm (112 in)	Outside-spiker
14	(France) Aurelia Ebatombo	1 October 1998 (age 26)	1.84 m (6 ft 0 in)	65 kg (143 lb)	261 cm (103 in)	273 cm (107 in)	Outside-spiker
16	(France) Margaux Chambon	3 May 2000 (age 24)	1.67 m (5 ft 6 in)	76 kg (168 lb)	251 cm (99 in)	242 cm (95 in)	Setter
17	(France) Laura Dreyer	26 August 1999 (age 25)	1.77 m (5 ft 10 in)	62 kg (137 lb)	272 cm (107 in)	264 cm (104 in)	Middle-blocker
20	(Peru) Carla Rueda	19 April 1990 (age 34)	1.81 m (5 ft 11 in)	75 kg (165 lb)	295 cm (116 in)	286 cm (113 in)	Outside-spiker

=== CS Volei Alba-Blaj ===
The following is the roster of the Romania club CS Volei Alba-Blaj in the 2017–18 CEV Women's Champions League.

Head coach: (Serbia) Darko Zakoč

No.	Name	Date of birth	Height	Weight	Spike	Block	Position
1	(Romania) Ramona Rus	8 October 1996 (age 28)	1.80 m (5 ft 11 in)	73 kg (161 lb)	297 cm (117 in)	291 cm (115 in)	Outside-spiker
2	(Romania) Adina Salaoru	5 July 1989 (age 35)	1.83 m (6 ft 0 in)	69 kg (152 lb)	304 cm (120 in)	300 cm (120 in)	Outside-spiker
3	(Romania) Andreea Cristina Tamas	26 November 1998 (age 26)	1.82 m (6 ft 0 in)	63 kg (139 lb)	295 cm (116 in)	280 cm (110 in)	Setter
4	(Brazil) Mariana Thomaz De Aquino	2 May 1991 (age 33)	1.92 m (6 ft 4 in)	68 kg (150 lb)	310 cm (120 in)	301 cm (119 in)	Middle-blocker
7	(Bulgaria) Slavina Koleva	22 November 1986 (age 38)	1.83 m (6 ft 0 in)	65 kg (143 lb)	300 cm (120 in)	290 cm (110 in)	Outside-spiker
8	(Bulgaria) Petya Barakova	18 June 1994 (age 30)	1.78 m (5 ft 10 in)	70 kg (150 lb)	280 cm (110 in)	270 cm (110 in)	Setter
9	(Serbia) Aleksandra Crnčević	30 May 1987 (age 37)	1.85 m (6 ft 1 in)	74 kg (163 lb)	305 cm (120 in)	303 cm (119 in)	Outside-spiker
10	(Cuba) Ana Cleger	27 November 1989 (age 35)	1.85 m (6 ft 1 in)	70 kg (150 lb)	305 cm (120 in)	300 cm (120 in)	Opposite
11	(Brazil) Renata Maggioni	21 April 1988 (age 36)	1.91 m (6 ft 3 in)	67 kg (148 lb)	308 cm (121 in)	300 cm (120 in)	Middle-blocker
13	(Turkey) Selime İlyasoğlu	18 November 1988 (age 36)	1.83 m (6 ft 0 in)	68 kg (150 lb)	303 cm (119 in)	297 cm (117 in)	Outside-spiker
15	(Germany) Lena Möllers	6 January 1990 (age 35)	1.89 m (6 ft 2 in)	75 kg (165 lb)	305 cm (120 in)	299 cm (118 in)	Setter
16	(Serbia) Marina Vujović	23 January 1984 (age 41)	1.63 m (5 ft 4 in)	59 kg (130 lb)	279 cm (110 in)	257 cm (101 in)	Libero
17	(Puerto Rico) Lynda Morales	23 January 1984 (age 41)	1.88 m (6 ft 2 in)	70 kg (150 lb)	305 cm (120 in)	298 cm (117 in)	Middle-blocker
18	(Romania) Nneka Onyejekwe	18 July 1989 (age 35)	1.89 m (6 ft 2 in)	70 kg (150 lb)	305 cm (120 in)	301 cm (119 in)	Middle-blocker
19	(Cuba) Jennifer Álvarez	19 November 1993 (age 31)	1.84 m (6 ft 0 in)	72 kg (159 lb)	305 cm (120 in)	298 cm (117 in)	Outside-spiker

=== Developres SkyRes Rzeszów ===
The following is the roster of the Poland club Developres SkyRes Rzeszów in the 2017–18 CEV Women's Champions League.

Head coach: (Italy) Lorenzo Micelli

No.	Name	Date of birth	Height	Weight	Spike	Block	Position
1	(Belgium) Hélène Rousseaux	25 September 1991 (age 33)	1.87 m (6 ft 2 in)	75 kg (165 lb)	322 cm (127 in)	305 cm (120 in)	Outside-spiker
3	(Poland) Monika Ptak	15 April 1990 (age 34)	1.87 m (6 ft 2 in)	77 kg (170 lb)	317 cm (125 in)	305 cm (120 in)	Middle-blocker
4	(Poland) Natalia Gajewska	24 May 1994 (age 30)	1.77 m (5 ft 10 in)	67 kg (148 lb)	285 cm (112 in)	272 cm (107 in)	Setter
5	(Poland) Magdalena Hawryła	1 January 1989 (age 36)	1.90 m (6 ft 3 in)	75 kg (165 lb)	315 cm (124 in)	305 cm (120 in)	Middle-blocker
6	(Poland) Katarzyna Żabińska	20 February 1989 (age 36)	1.83 m (6 ft 0 in)	75 kg (165 lb)	305 cm (120 in)	295 cm (116 in)	Middle-blocker
7	(Poland) Ewa Żak	27 April 1993 (age 31)	1.82 m (6 ft 0 in)	69 kg (152 lb)	291 cm (115 in)	285 cm (112 in)	Outside-spiker
8	(Poland) Anna Kaczmar	26 September 1985 (age 39)	1.81 m (5 ft 11 in)	67 kg (148 lb)	290 cm (110 in)	285 cm (112 in)	Setter
9	(Poland) Agata Sawicka	17 January 1985 (age 40)	1.81 m (5 ft 11 in)	74 kg (163 lb)	295 cm (116 in)	289 cm (114 in)	Libero
10	(Serbia) Adela Helić	24 February 1990 (age 35)	1.85 m (6 ft 1 in)	80 kg (180 lb)	311 cm (122 in)	300 cm (120 in)	Opposite
13	(Poland) Kamila Ganszczyk	2 December 1991 (age 33)	1.91 m (6 ft 3 in)	79 kg (174 lb)	325 cm (128 in)	310 cm (120 in)	Middle-blocker
14	(Poland) Agnieszka Rabka	30 August 1978 (age 46)	1.78 m (5 ft 10 in)	65 kg (143 lb)	294 cm (116 in)	280 cm (110 in)	Setter
16	(Poland) Klaudia Kaczorowska	20 December 1988 (age 36)	1.83 m (6 ft 0 in)	70 kg (150 lb)	297 cm (117 in)	290 cm (110 in)	Outside-spiker
17	(Russia) Yulia Andrushka	5 July 1985 (age 39)	1.98 m (6 ft 6 in)	94 kg (207 lb)	330 cm (130 in)	312 cm (123 in)	Opposite
18	(Poland) Lucyna Borek	22 June 1987 (age 37)	1.63 m (5 ft 4 in)	59 kg (130 lb)	275 cm (108 in)	269 cm (106 in)	Libero
19	(Poland) Pola Nowakowska	30 January 1996 (age 29)	1.80 m (5 ft 11 in)	75 kg (165 lb)	300 cm (120 in)	285 cm (112 in)	Libero
20	(Serbia) Jelena Blagojević	1 December 1988 (age 36)	1.81 m (5 ft 11 in)	67 kg (148 lb)	302 cm (119 in)	284 cm (112 in)	Outside-spiker

=== Voléro Zürich ===
The following is the roster of the Switzerland club Voléro Zürich in the 2017–18 CEV Women's Champions League.

Head coach: (Brazil) Gil Ferrer Cutiño

No.	Name	Date of birth	Height	Weight	Spike	Block	Position
1	(Russia) Angelina Lazarenko	13 April 1998 (age 26)	1.93 m (6 ft 4 in)	80 kg (180 lb)	320 cm (130 in)	305 cm (120 in)	Middle-blocker
2	(Finland) Tiiamari Sievänen	19 July 1994 (age 30)	1.65 m (5 ft 5 in)	60 kg (130 lb)	275 cm (108 in)	287 cm (113 in)	Libero
3	(Serbia) Ljubica Milojevic	13 February 1999 (age 26)	1.93 m (6 ft 4 in)	70 kg (150 lb)	300 cm (120 in)	300 cm (120 in)	Middle-blocker
4	(Brazil) Samara Almeida	16 July 1992 (age 32)	1.85 m (6 ft 1 in)	61 kg (134 lb)	293 cm (115 in)	278 cm (109 in)	Outside-spiker
5	(Bulgaria) Gergana Dimitrova	28 February 1996 (age 29)	1.84 m (6 ft 0 in)	71 kg (157 lb)	305 cm (120 in)	288 cm (113 in)	Outside-spiker
6	(Switzerland) Gabi Schottroff	8 February 1997 (age 28)	1.92 m (6 ft 4 in)	78 kg (172 lb)	302 cm (119 in)	285 cm (112 in)	Middle-blocker
7	(Serbia) Ana Antonijević	26 August 1987 (age 37)	1.85 m (6 ft 1 in)	71 kg (157 lb)	282 cm (111 in)	269 cm (106 in)	Setter
8	(Serbia) Silvija Popović	15 March 1986 (age 39)	1.78 m (5 ft 10 in)	65 kg (143 lb)	286 cm (113 in)	276 cm (109 in)	Libero
11	(Bulgaria) Mira Todorova	12 April 1994 (age 30)	1.87 m (6 ft 2 in)	77 kg (170 lb)	312 cm (123 in)	300 cm (120 in)	Middle-blocker
12	(Russia) / (Cuba) Rosir Calderón	28 December 1984 (age 40)	1.91 m (6 ft 3 in)	73 kg (161 lb)	330 cm (130 in)	325 cm (128 in)	Opposite
13	(Russia) Anastasia Kornienko	9 September 1992 (age 32)	1.84 m (6 ft 0 in)	71 kg (157 lb)	290 cm (110 in)	278 cm (109 in)	Setter
14	(Switzerland) Julie Lengweiler	6 November 1998 (age 26)	1.86 m (6 ft 1 in)	70 kg (150 lb)	302 cm (119 in)	285 cm (112 in)	Opposite
17	(Switzerland) Laura Unternährer	11 July 1993 (age 31)	1.79 m (5 ft 10 in)	70 kg (150 lb)	303 cm (119 in)	285 cm (112 in)	Outside-spiker
18	(Sweden) Alexandra Lazić	29 April 1994 (age 30)	1.85 m (6 ft 1 in)	72 kg (159 lb)	318 cm (125 in)	307 cm (121 in)	Outside-spiker

== Pool B ==
=== Agel Prostějov ===
The following is the roster of the Czech Republic club Agel Prostějov in the 2017–18 CEV Women's Champions League.

Head coach: (Czech Republic) Miroslav Čada

No.	Name	Date of birth	Height	Weight	Spike	Block	Position
1	(Czech Republic) Andrea Kossanyiová	6 August 1993 (age 31)	1.85 m (6 ft 1 in)	72 kg (159 lb)	310 cm (120 in)	305 cm (120 in)	Outside Hitter
2	(Czech Republic) Helena Horka	15 June 1981 (age 43)	1.91 m (6 ft 3 in)	79 kg (174 lb)	320 cm (130 in)	310 cm (120 in)	Opposite
3	(Czech Republic) Veronika Trnková	13 October 1995 (age 29)	1.88 m (6 ft 2 in)	86 kg (190 lb)	315 cm (124 in)	310 cm (120 in)	Middle-blocker
4	(Czech Republic) Sarah Cruz	8 March 1998 (age 27)	1.83 m (6 ft 0 in)	70 kg (150 lb)	305 cm (120 in)	300 cm (120 in)	Opposite
6	(Germany) Kathleen Weiß	2 February 1984 (age 41)	1.76 m (5 ft 9 in)	55 kg (121 lb)	298 cm (117 in)	290 cm (110 in)	Setter
8	(Slovakia) Gabriela Tomášeková	20 September 1983 (age 41)	1.86 m (6 ft 1 in)	65 kg (143 lb)	308 cm (121 in)	300 cm (120 in)	Middle-blocker
9	(Slovakia) Nina Herelová	30 July 1993 (age 31)	1.84 m (6 ft 0 in)	63 kg (139 lb)	314 cm (124 in)	306 cm (120 in)	Middle-blocker
12	(Czech Republic) Julie Jášová	14 September 1987 (age 37)	1.79 m (5 ft 10 in)	62 kg (137 lb)	295 cm (116 in)	290 cm (110 in)	Libero
13	(Czech Republic) Lucie Nová	3 May 1996 (age 28)	1.84 m (6 ft 0 in)	68 kg (150 lb)	312 cm (123 in)	303 cm (119 in)	Outside-spiker
15	(Czech Republic) Michaela Zatloukalová	16 April 1995 (age 29)	1.82 m (6 ft 0 in)	72 kg (159 lb)	300 cm (120 in)	295 cm (116 in)	Setter
16	(Czech Republic) Tereza Slavíková	5 August 1998 (age 26)	1.75 m (5 ft 9 in)	63 kg (139 lb)	285 cm (112 in)	280 cm (110 in)	Libero
17	(Germany) Laura Weihenmaier	4 April 1991 (age 33)	1.80 m (5 ft 11 in)	65 kg (143 lb)	312 cm (123 in)	304 cm (120 in)	Outside-spiker

=== Fenerbahçe SK Istanbul ===
The following is the roster of the Turkey club Fenerbahçe SK Istanbul in the 2017–18 CEV Women's Champions League.

Head coach: (Belgium) Jan De Brandt

No.	Name	Date of birth	Height	Weight	Spike	Block	Position
1	(Turkey) Melis Yılmaz	28 June 1997 (age 27)	1.67 m (5 ft 6 in)	52 kg (115 lb)	257 cm (101 in)	245 cm (96 in)	Libero
2	(Turkey) Merve Dalbeler	27 June 1987 (age 37)	1.80 m (5 ft 11 in)	70 kg (150 lb)	295 cm (116 in)	248 cm (98 in)	Libero
4	(Turkey) Ezgi Dağdelenler	3 November 1993 (age 31)	1.84 m (6 ft 0 in)	69 kg (152 lb)	305 cm (120 in)	272 cm (107 in)	Outside-spiker
6	(Turkey) Polen Uslupehlivan	27 August 1990 (age 34)	1.92 m (6 ft 4 in)	70 kg (150 lb)	315 cm (124 in)	300 cm (120 in)	Opposite
7	(Turkey) Çağla Akın	19 January 1995 (age 30)	1.78 m (5 ft 10 in)	67 kg (148 lb)	295 cm (116 in)	271 cm (107 in)	Setter
8	(Turkey) Dicle Nur Babat	15 September 1992 (age 32)	1.91 m (6 ft 3 in)	78 kg (172 lb)	318 cm (125 in)	305 cm (120 in)	Middle-blocker
11	(Turkey) Bahar Toksoy	6 February 1988 (age 37)	1.90 m (6 ft 3 in)	75 kg (165 lb)	315 cm (124 in)	300 cm (120 in)	Middle-blocker
12	(Brazil) Natália Pereira	4 April 1989 (age 35)	1.83 m (6 ft 0 in)	80 kg (180 lb)	325 cm (128 in)	288 cm (113 in)	Outside-spiker
13	(Thailand) Nootsara Tomkom	7 July 1985 (age 39)	1.75 m (5 ft 9 in)	54 kg (119 lb)	290 cm (110 in)	280 cm (110 in)	Setter
14	(Turkey) Eda Erdem Dündar	16 April 1995 (age 29)	1.88 m (6 ft 2 in)	75 kg (165 lb)	315 cm (124 in)	302 cm (119 in)	Middle-blocker
15	(Turkey) Damla Çakıroğlu	5 August 1998 (age 26)	1.81 m (5 ft 11 in)	78 kg (172 lb)	304 cm (120 in)	273 cm (107 in)	Outside-spiker
17	(Azerbaijan) Polina Rahimova	5 June 1990 (age 34)	1.98 m (6 ft 6 in)	87 kg (192 lb)	330 cm (130 in)	305 cm (120 in)	Opposite
18	(Croatia) Mia Jerkov	5 December 1982 (age 42)	1.92 m (6 ft 4 in)	87 kg (192 lb)	307 cm (121 in)	298 cm (117 in)	Opposite

=== Imoco Volley Conegliano ===
The following is the roster of the Italia club Imoco Volley Conegliano in the 2017–18 CEV Women's Champions League.

Head coach: (Italy) Daniele Santarelli

No.	Name	Date of birth	Height	Weight	Spike	Block	Position
2	(Mexico) Samantha Bricio	22 November 1994 (age 30)	1.88 m (6 ft 2 in)	60 kg (130 lb)	302 cm (119 in)	283 cm (111 in)	Outside-spiker
3	(Italy) Silvia Fiori	18 July 1994 (age 30)	1.62 m (5 ft 4 in)	60 kg (130 lb)	292 cm (115 in)	210 cm (83 in)	Libero
4	(United States) Simone Lee	7 October 1996 (age 28)	1.86 m (6 ft 1 in)	70 kg (150 lb)	307 cm (121 in)	292 cm (115 in)	Outside-spiker
5	(Netherlands) Robin de Kruijf	5 May 1991 (age 33)	1.93 m (6 ft 4 in)	79 kg (174 lb)	313 cm (123 in)	300 cm (120 in)	Middle-blocker
6	(Italy) Elisa Cella	4 June 1982 (age 42)	1.86 m (6 ft 1 in)	72 kg (159 lb)	319 cm (126 in)	237 cm (93 in)	Outside-spiker
7	(Italy) Raphaela Folie	19 January 1995 (age 30)	1.85 m (6 ft 1 in)	69 kg (152 lb)	327 cm (129 in)	238 cm (94 in)	Middle-blocker
8	(United States) Megan Hodge	15 October 1988 (age 36)	1.91 m (6 ft 3 in)	70 kg (150 lb)	322 cm (127 in)	318 cm (125 in)	Outside-spiker
9	(Italy) Laura Melandri	31 January 1995 (age 30)	1.87 m (6 ft 2 in)	73 kg (161 lb)	310 cm (120 in)	237 cm (93 in)	Middle-blocker
10	(Italy) Monica De Gennaro	8 January 1987 (age 38)	1.72 m (5 ft 8 in)	62 kg (137 lb)	295 cm (116 in)	217 cm (85 in)	Libero
11	(Italy) Anna Danesi	20 April 1996 (age 28)	1.95 m (6 ft 5 in)	77 kg (170 lb)	312 cm (123 in)	246 cm (97 in)	Middle-blocker
12	(Greece) Athina Papafotiou	23 August 1989 (age 35)	1.80 m (5 ft 11 in)	67 kg (148 lb)	284 cm (112 in)	280 cm (110 in)	Setter
13	(Croatia) Samanta Fabris	8 February 1992 (age 33)	1.88 m (6 ft 2 in)	79 kg (174 lb)	318 cm (125 in)	304 cm (120 in)	Opposite
14	(Poland) Joanna Wołosz	7 April 1990 (age 34)	1.81 m (5 ft 11 in)	65 kg (143 lb)	303 cm (119 in)	281 cm (111 in)	Setter
15	(United States) Kimberly Hill	30 November 1989 (age 35)	1.93 m (6 ft 4 in)	72 kg (159 lb)	320 cm (130 in)	310 cm (120 in)	Outside-spiker
16	(Italy) Anna Nicoletti	3 January 1996 (age 29)	1.93 m (6 ft 4 in)	85 kg (187 lb)	312 cm (123 in)	292 cm (115 in)	Opposite

=== Igor Gorgonzola Novara ===
The following is the roster of the Italia club Igor Gorgonzola Novara in the 2017–18 CEV Women's Champions League.

Head coach: (Italy) Massimo Barbolini

No.	Name	Date of birth	Height	Weight	Spike	Block	Position
1	(Greece) Anthí Vasilantonáki	9 April 1996 (age 28)	1.96 m (6 ft 5 in)	80 kg (180 lb)	305 cm (120 in)	284 cm (112 in)	Outside-spiker
3	(Italy) Letizia Camera	1 October 1992 (age 32)	1.75 m (5 ft 9 in)	70 kg (150 lb)	286 cm (113 in)	275 cm (108 in)	Setter
4	(Netherlands) Celeste Plak	26 October 1995 (age 29)	1.90 m (6 ft 3 in)	84 kg (185 lb)	314 cm (124 in)	302 cm (119 in)	Outside-spiker
5	(United States) Lauren Gibbemeyer	8 September 1988 (age 36)	1.87 m (6 ft 2 in)	71 kg (157 lb)	307 cm (121 in)	293 cm (115 in)	Middle-blocker
7	(Puerto Rico) Stephanie Enright	15 December 1990 (age 34)	1.79 m (5 ft 10 in)	56 kg (123 lb)	300 cm (120 in)	292 cm (115 in)	Outside-spiker
8	(Poland) Katarzyna Skorupa	16 September 1984 (age 40)	1.83 m (6 ft 0 in)	73 kg (161 lb)	302 cm (119 in)	296 cm (117 in)	Setter
9	(Italy) Sara Bonifacio	3 July 1996 (age 28)	1.84 m (6 ft 0 in)	72 kg (159 lb)	308 cm (121 in)	294 cm (116 in)	Middle-blocker
10	(Italy) Cristina Chirichella	10 February 1994 (age 31)	1.95 m (6 ft 5 in)	76 kg (168 lb)	320 cm (130 in)	301 cm (119 in)	Middle-blocker
11	(Italy) Stefania Sansonna	1 November 1982 (age 42)	1.75 m (5 ft 9 in)	72 kg (159 lb)	295 cm (116 in)	270 cm (110 in)	Libero
12	(Italy) Francesca Piccinini	10 January 1979 (age 46)	1.84 m (6 ft 0 in)	75 kg (165 lb)	315 cm (124 in)	288 cm (113 in)	Outside-spiker
15	(Italy) Giorgia Zannoni	8 February 1992 (age 33)	1.75 m (5 ft 9 in)	68 kg (150 lb)	318 cm (125 in)	304 cm (120 in)	Libero
18	(Italy) Paola Egonu	18 December 1998 (age 26)	1.90 m (6 ft 3 in)	79 kg (174 lb)	336 cm (132 in)	281 cm (111 in)	Opposite

== Pool C ==
=== Chemik Police ===
The following is the roster of the Poland club Chemik Police in the 2017–18 CEV Women's Champions League.

Head coach: (Poland) Jakub Głuszak

No.	Name	Date of birth	Height	Weight	Spike	Block	Position
1	(Serbia) Bianka Buša	25 July 1994 (age 30)	1.87 m (6 ft 2 in)	74 kg (163 lb)	312 cm (123 in)	298 cm (117 in)	Outside-spiker
3	(United States) Alexandra Holston	3 April 1995 (age 29)	1.88 m (6 ft 2 in)	73 kg (161 lb)	323 cm (127 in)	307 cm (121 in)	Opposite
4	(Poland) Katarzyna Gajgał-Anioł	21 September 1981 (age 43)	1.91 m (6 ft 3 in)	85 kg (187 lb)	308 cm (121 in)	298 cm (117 in)	Middle-blocker
6	(Poland) Agnieszka Bednarek-Kasza	20 February 1986 (age 39)	1.85 m (6 ft 1 in)	72 kg (159 lb)	310 cm (120 in)	303 cm (119 in)	Middle-blocker
7	(Poland) Malwina Smarzek	3 June 1996 (age 28)	1.91 m (6 ft 3 in)	79 kg (174 lb)	318 cm (125 in)	305 cm (120 in)	Outside-spiker
8	(Poland) Izabela Bełcik	29 November 1980 (age 44)	1.85 m (6 ft 1 in)	70 kg (150 lb)	304 cm (120 in)	292 cm (115 in)	Setter
11	(Serbia) Stefana Veljković	9 January 1990 (age 35)	1.90 m (6 ft 3 in)	76 kg (168 lb)	325 cm (128 in)	310 cm (120 in)	Middle-blocker
13	(Serbia) Slađana Mirković	7 October 1995 (age 29)	1.85 m (6 ft 1 in)	78 kg (172 lb)	293 cm (115 in)	283 cm (111 in)	Setter
14	(Poland) Natalia Mędrzyk	13 January 1992 (age 33)	1.84 m (6 ft 0 in)	74 kg (163 lb)	306 cm (120 in)	296 cm (117 in)	Outside-spiker
15	(Bulgaria) Strashimira Filipova	18 August 1985 (age 39)	1.95 m (6 ft 5 in)	78 kg (172 lb)	308 cm (121 in)	308 cm (121 in)	Middle-blocker
16	(Netherlands) Maret Balkestein-Grothues	16 September 1988 (age 36)	1.80 m (5 ft 11 in)	72 kg (159 lb)	304 cm (120 in)	285 cm (112 in)	Outside-spiker
17	(Poland) Aleksandra Krzos	23 June 1989 (age 35)	1.81 m (5 ft 11 in)	71 kg (157 lb)	282 cm (111 in)	269 cm (106 in)	Libero
18	(Poland) Katarzyna Zaroślińska	3 February 1987 (age 38)	1.87 m (6 ft 2 in)	82 kg (181 lb)	322 cm (127 in)	300 cm (120 in)	Opposite

=== Dinamo Kazan ===
The following is the roster of the Russia club Dinamo Kazan in the 2017–18 CEV Women's Champions League.

Head coach: (Russia) Rishat Gilyazutdinov

No.	Name	Date of birth	Height	Weight	Spike	Block	Position
3	(Russia) Elena Ezhova	14 August 1977 (age 47)	1.78 m (5 ft 10 in)	65 kg (143 lb)	260 cm (100 in)	255 cm (100 in)	Libero
4	(Russia) Marina Vladimirovna Maryukhnich	26 November 1982 (age 42)	1.96 m (6 ft 5 in)	78 kg (172 lb)	320 cm (130 in)	305 cm (120 in)	Middle-blocker
5	(Russia) Svetlana Masaleva	29 April 1999 (age 25)	1.72 m (5 ft 8 in)	67 kg (148 lb)	200 cm (79 in)	190 cm (75 in)	Libero
6	(Russia) Irina Zaryazhko	4 October 1991 (age 33)	1.96 m (6 ft 5 in)	78 kg (172 lb)	315 cm (124 in)	305 cm (120 in)	Middle-blocker
7	(Russia) Anna Kotikova	13 October 1999 (age 25)	1.86 m (6 ft 1 in)	75 kg (165 lb)	300 cm (120 in)	295 cm (116 in)	Outside-spiker
8	(Russia) Irina Voronkova	20 October 1995 (age 29)	1.94 m (6 ft 4 in)	86 kg (190 lb)	310 cm (120 in)	300 cm (120 in)	Outside-spiker
9	(Azerbaijan) Natalya Mammadova	2 December 1984 (age 40)	1.96 m (6 ft 5 in)	78 kg (172 lb)	319 cm (126 in)	302 cm (119 in)	Opposite
13	(Russia) Yevgeniya Startseva	12 February 1989 (age 36)	1.85 m (6 ft 1 in)	65 kg (143 lb)	295 cm (116 in)	290 cm (110 in)	Setter
14	(Russia) Ekaterina Ulanova	5 August 1986 (age 38)	1.70 m (5 ft 7 in)	60 kg (130 lb)	290 cm (110 in)	280 cm (110 in)	Libero
15	(Russia) Irina Filishtinskaia	14 June 1990 (age 34)	1.80 m (5 ft 11 in)	71 kg (157 lb)	305 cm (120 in)	293 cm (115 in)	Setter
18	(Bulgaria) Elitsa Vasileva	13 May 1990 (age 34)	1.92 m (6 ft 4 in)	73 kg (161 lb)	305 cm (120 in)	295 cm (116 in)	Outside-spiker
19	(Russia) Daria Malygina	4 April 1994 (age 30)	2.01 m (6 ft 7 in)	80 kg (180 lb)	320 cm (130 in)	310 cm (120 in)	Opposite
20	(Russia) Anastasia Shlyakhovaya	5 October 1990 (age 34)	1.92 m (6 ft 4 in)	78 kg (172 lb)	315 cm (124 in)	300 cm (120 in)	Middle-blocker

=== Maritza Plovdiv ===
The following is the roster of the Bulgaria club Maritza Plovdiv in the 2017–18 CEV Women's Champions League.

Head coach: (Bulgaria) Ivan Petkov

No.	Name	Date of birth	Height	Weight	Spike	Block	Position
1	(Bulgaria) Mariya Dancheva	4 December 1995 (age 29)	1.95 m (6 ft 5 in)	73 kg (161 lb)	315 cm (124 in)	310 cm (120 in)	Middle-blocker
2	(Bulgaria) Nasya Dimitrova	6 November 1992 (age 32)	1.92 m (6 ft 4 in)	74 kg (163 lb)	312 cm (123 in)	310 cm (120 in)	Middle-blocker
3	(Bulgaria) Tanya Petkova	10 June 1988 (age 36)	1.86 m (6 ft 1 in)	68 kg (150 lb)	300 cm (120 in)	292 cm (115 in)	Outside-spiker
4	(Bulgaria) Lora Kitipova	19 May 1991 (age 33)	1.83 m (6 ft 0 in)	68 kg (150 lb)	295 cm (116 in)	290 cm (110 in)	Setter
6	(Bulgaria) Kremena Kamenova	21 May 1988 (age 36)	1.85 m (6 ft 1 in)	66 kg (146 lb)	303 cm (119 in)	295 cm (116 in)	Outside-spiker
7	(Bulgaria) Desislava Nikolova	21 December 1991 (age 33)	1.80 m (5 ft 11 in)	63 kg (139 lb)	295 cm (116 in)	290 cm (110 in)	Outside-spiker
8	(Bulgaria) Simona Dimitrova	17 July 1994 (age 30)	1.84 m (6 ft 0 in)	70 kg (150 lb)	300 cm (120 in)	293 cm (115 in)	Outside-spiker
9	(Serbia) Kristina Cesljar	11 July 1985 (age 39)	1.80 m (5 ft 11 in)	65 kg (143 lb)	295 cm (116 in)	284 cm (112 in)	Setter
10	(Bulgaria) Radosveta Teneva	21 November 1980 (age 44)	1.86 m (6 ft 1 in)	73 kg (161 lb)	308 cm (121 in)	300 cm (120 in)	Outside-spiker
11	(Bulgaria) Viktoriya Grigorova	25 July 1990 (age 34)	1.90 m (6 ft 3 in)	71 kg (157 lb)	305 cm (120 in)	300 cm (120 in)	Middle-blocker
12	(Bulgaria) Dima Usheva	16 December 2000 (age 24)	1.94 m (6 ft 4 in)	75 kg (165 lb)	305 cm (120 in)	300 cm (120 in)	Middle-blocker
13	(Bulgaria) Ivelina Monova	17 January 1986 (age 39)	1.72 m (5 ft 8 in)	65 kg (143 lb)	285 cm (112 in)	280 cm (110 in)	Libero
14	(Bulgaria) Gabriela Tsvetanova	11 April 1991 (age 33)	1.90 m (6 ft 3 in)	75 kg (165 lb)	305 cm (120 in)	300 cm (120 in)	Opposite
15	(Bulgaria) Zhana Todorova	6 January 1997 (age 28)	1.68 m (5 ft 6 in)	57 kg (126 lb)	275 cm (108 in)	270 cm (110 in)	Libero
17	(Bulgaria) Silvia Andreeva	18 August 1995 (age 29)	1.82 m (6 ft 0 in)	63 kg (139 lb)	295 cm (116 in)	290 cm (110 in)	Outside-spiker
19	(Bulgaria) Mirela Shahpazova	28 October 1997 (age 27)	1.72 m (5 ft 8 in)	65 kg (143 lb)	270 cm (110 in)	265 cm (104 in)	Setter
20	(Bulgaria) Milena Dimova	5 July 1994 (age 30)	1.92 m (6 ft 4 in)	61 kg (134 lb)	305 cm (120 in)	298 cm (117 in)	Middle-blocker

=== Vizura Ruma ===
The following is the roster of the Serbia club Vizura Ruma in the 2017–18 CEV Women's Champions League.

Head coach: (Serbia) Dejan Desnica

No.	Name	Date of birth	Height	Weight	Spike	Block	Position
1	(Serbia) Slađana Erić	29 July 1983 (age 41)	1.86 m (6 ft 1 in)	86 kg (190 lb)	306 cm (120 in)	290 cm (110 in)	Opposite
2	(Serbia) Katarina Gajevic	12 October 2000 (age 24)	1.85 m (6 ft 1 in)	68 kg (150 lb)	290 cm (110 in)	278 cm (109 in)	Outside-spiker
3	(Serbia) Milena Dimic	31 August 1997 (age 27)	1.71 m (5 ft 7 in)	68 kg (150 lb)	260 cm (100 in)	250 cm (98 in)	Libero
4	(Serbia) Sara Lozo	29 April 1997 (age 27)	1.85 m (6 ft 1 in)	69 kg (152 lb)	293 cm (115 in)	280 cm (110 in)	Outside-spiker
5	(Serbia) Andjela Micunovic	11 March 1999 (age 26)	1.68 m (5 ft 6 in)	63 kg (139 lb)	260 cm (100 in)	245 cm (96 in)	Libero
6	(Serbia) Jovana Adzic	25 February 2000 (age 25)	1.95 m (6 ft 5 in)	79 kg (174 lb)	293 cm (115 in)	283 cm (111 in)	Middle-blocker
7	(Serbia) Katarina Lazovic	12 September 1999 (age 25)	1.83 m (6 ft 0 in)	66 kg (146 lb)	297 cm (117 in)	280 cm (110 in)	Outside-spiker
8	(Serbia) Maja Aleksic	6 June 1997 (age 27)	1.88 m (6 ft 2 in)	72 kg (159 lb)	302 cm (119 in)	289 cm (114 in)	Middle-blocker
10	(Serbia) Andjela Veselinovic	5 February 1992 (age 33)	1.78 m (5 ft 10 in)	68 kg (150 lb)	286 cm (113 in)	272 cm (107 in)	Setter
13	(Serbia) Jovana Kocic	24 February 1998 (age 27)	1.91 m (6 ft 3 in)	78 kg (172 lb)	302 cm (119 in)	288 cm (113 in)	Middle-blocker
14	(Serbia) Aleksandra Cirovic	30 September 1997 (age 27)	1.80 m (5 ft 11 in)	64 kg (141 lb)	290 cm (110 in)	270 cm (110 in)	Setter
15	(Serbia) Ana Pejicic	5 November 2000 (age 24)	1.91 m (6 ft 3 in)	74 kg (163 lb)	302 cm (119 in)	290 cm (110 in)	Outside-spiker
16	(Serbia) Isidora Rodic	27 January 2001 (age 24)	1.85 m (6 ft 1 in)	77 kg (170 lb)	290 cm (110 in)	281 cm (111 in)	Middle-blocker
17	(Serbia) Mila Kocic	31 August 2001 (age 23)	1.70 m (5 ft 7 in)	67 kg (148 lb)	262 cm (103 in)	255 cm (100 in)	Libero
18	(Serbia) Sara Caric	1 February 2001 (age 24)	1.92 m (6 ft 4 in)	68 kg (150 lb)	295 cm (116 in)	288 cm (113 in)	Opposite
