= Paulina Maj-Erwardt =

Polish volleyball player

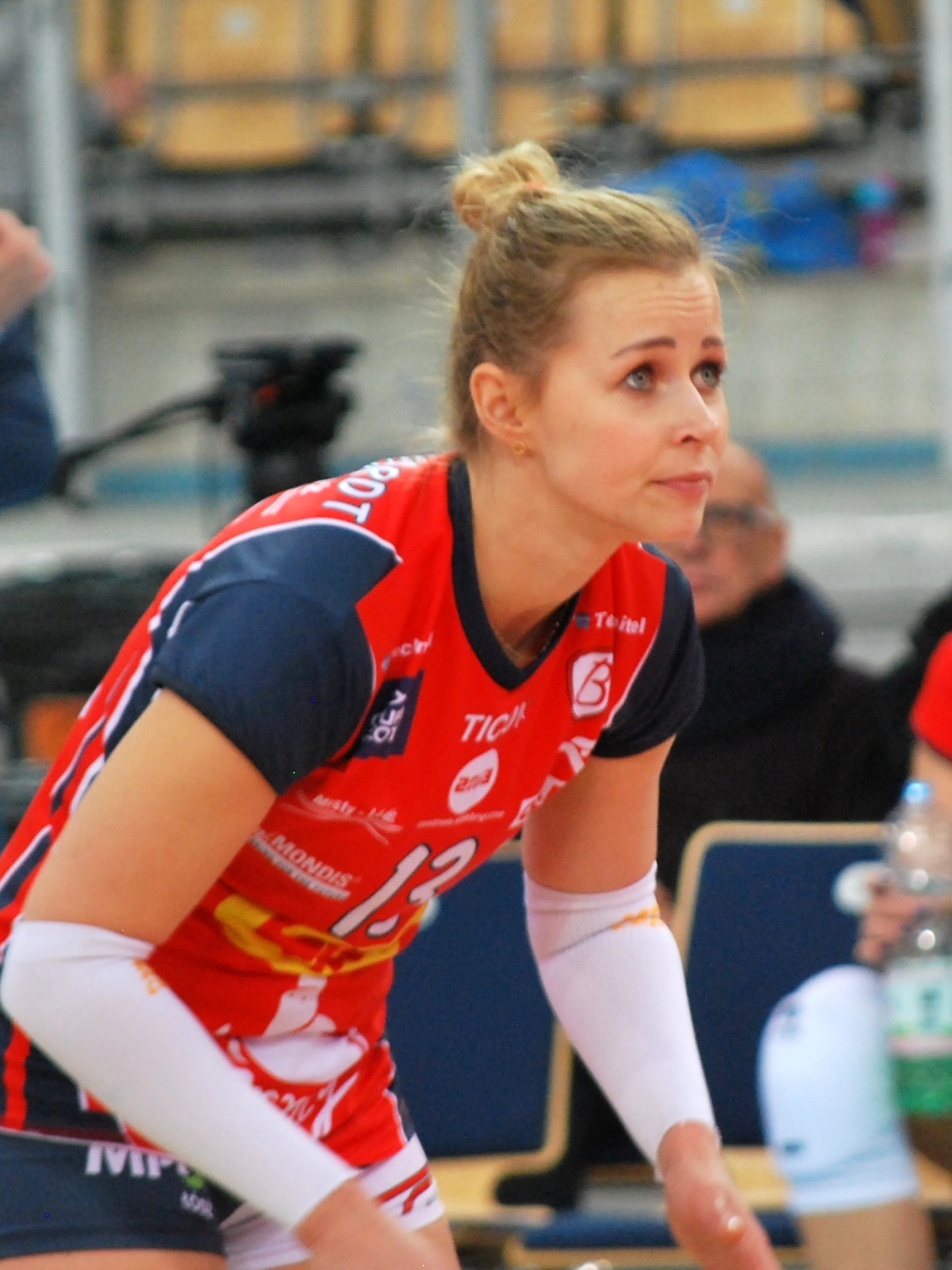
- Paulina Maj-Erwardt in 2016

Personal information
- Nationality: Polish
- Born: Paulina Maj; 22 March 1987 (age 39); Złotów, Poland
- Height: 166 cm (5 ft 5 in)

Volleyball information
- Position: Libero

Career
Years	Teams
2005–2008	BKS Bielsko-Biała
2008–2010	PTPS Piła
2010–2012	Atom Trefl Sopot
2012–2015	Muszynianka Muszyna
2015–2016	KPS Chemik Police
2016–2017	Budowlani Łódź
2018–2019	BKS Bielsko-Biała
2019–2021	KPS Chemik Police
2021–2024	ŁKS Łódź
2025	Sparta Złotów

National team
2006–?	Poland
Honours
Representing Poland
European Volleyball Championship
Bronze medal – third place	2009 Poland	Volleyball
Summer Universiade
Bronze medal – third place	2009 Belgrade	Volleyball
- Last updated: 23 September 2021

Paulina Maj-Erwardt (née Maj, born 22 March 1987) is a Polish volleyball player, who plays as a libero. She was part of the Polish team that came third at the 2009 Women's European Volleyball Championship and the 2009 Summer Universiade. She most recently played for Sparta Złotów.

== Domestic career ==
Maj-Erwadt has played in Poland for her entire career. Between 2005 and 2008, she played for BKS Bielsko-Biała, and later played for PTPS Piła, Atom Trefl Sopot, Muszynianka Muszyna, KPS Chemik Police, and Budowlani Łódź. Maj-Erwardt took time away from the sport for the birth of her child. She returned for the 2018–2019 season, playing for BKS Bielsko-Biała, in a second stint for the club. For the 2019–20 season, Maj-Erwardt signed for KPS Chemik Police. She was the fifth best receiver in the 2019–20 season, and resigned for Chemik Police for the 2020–21 season. In 2021, she signed for ŁKS Łódź for the 2021–22 season.

In 2024, Maj-Erwadt announced her retirement from volleyball, but changed her mind in January 2025 and signed for Sparta Złotów, a club where she was also youth president. In July 2025, she became a member of the Polish Volleyball Federation focusing on women's volleyball.

== International career ==
Maj-Erwadt has made 108 appearances for the Poland national team. Maj was part of the Polish team that came third at the 2009 Women's European Volleyball Championship, and came third in the women's volleyball event at the 2009 Summer Universiade. She was named the tournament's sixth best libero. She represented Poland in qualifying for the 2012 and 2016 Summer Olympics. She played at the 2019 Montreux Volley Masters
