= KPS Chemik Police =

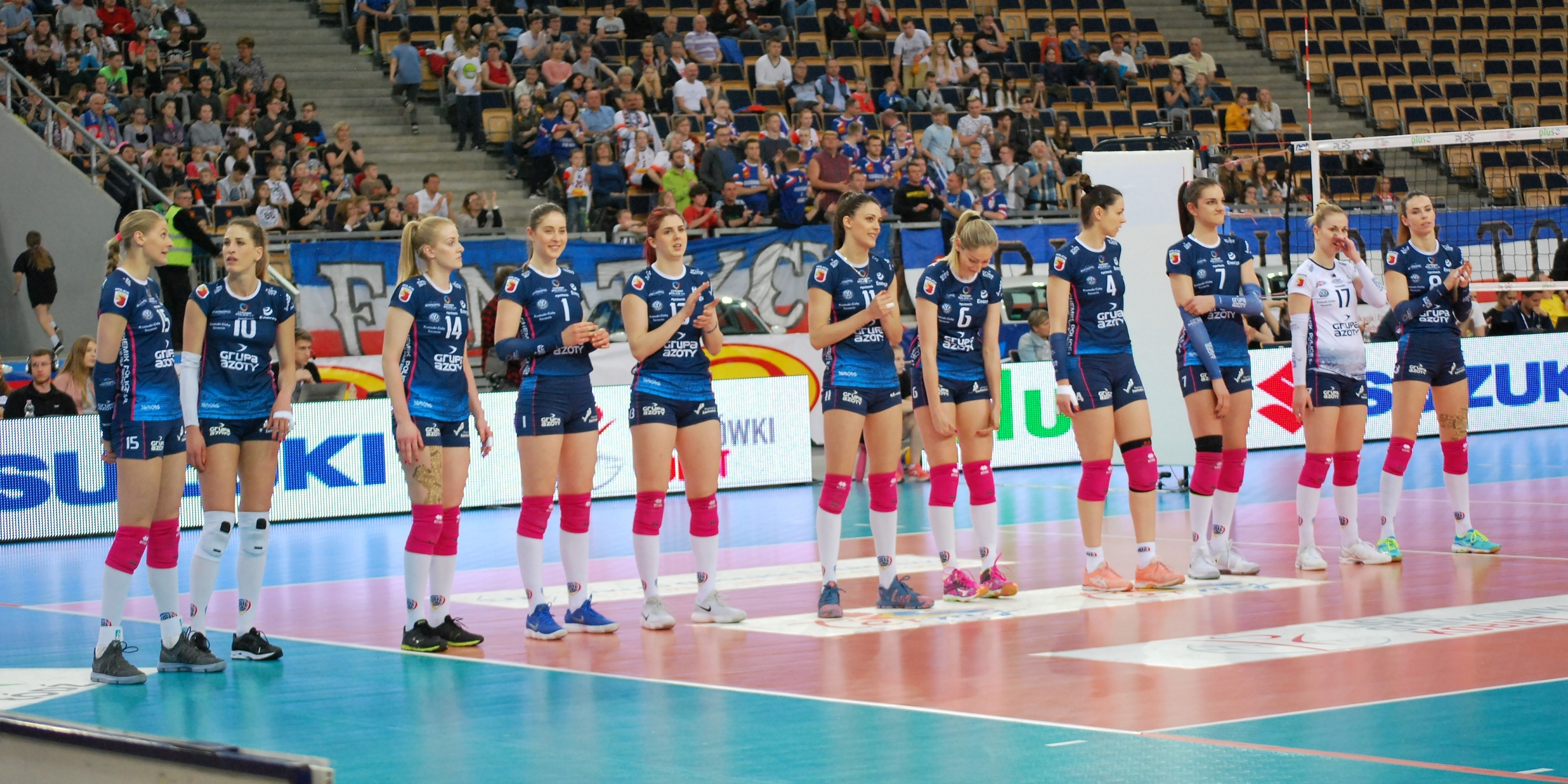
- Full name: Klub Piłki Siatkowej Chemik Police Spółka Akcyjna
- Short name: Chemik Police
- Nickname: Chemiczki
- Founded: 1989
- Ground: Azoty Arena, Szczecin, Poland (Capacity: 5,403)
- Chairman: (Poland) Paweł Frankowski
- Manager: (Italy) Marco Fenoglio
- League: TAURON Liga
- 2020–21: Gold
- Website: Club home page

Uniforms
Home	Away

KPS Chemik Police is the professional women's volleyball department of Polish sports club Chemik Police based in Police and plays in the Tauron Liga.

== Previous names ==
Due to sponsorship, the club have competed under the following names:

- KS Chemik Police (1989–1993)
- ARS Komfort Police (1993–1994)
- KS Chemik Police (1994–....)
- PSPS Chemik Police (....–2013)
- KPS Chemik Police (2013–2014)
- Chemik Police (2014–present)

== History ==
Sports club Klub Sportowy (KS) Chemik Police created its women's volleyball department in 1989. Two years later, in 1991, the club made its debut in the League 1, the highest division in Poland. It was relegated at the end of the 1991–92 season, but in the following season it won the Polish Cup and promotion to the Liga 1 before (due to sponsorship) changing its name to ARS Komfort in July 1993. In its second spell at League 1, the club had immediate success, winning the Polish Championships and the Polish Cup for two consecutive seasons (1993–94 and 1994–95). In that same period the club finished third at the 1993–94 CEV Cup Winners Cup. In October 1994, the club was renamed KS Chemik Police after losing its main sponsor and with financial issues in the following seasons, the club was relegated in 1998.

After years playing in the lower leagues under the name Polickie Stowarzyszenie Pilki Siatkowej (PSPS) Chemik Police, a large industrial local chemical plant called Zakłady Chemiczne Police S.A. (a subsidiary of Grupa Azoty) which for long had a strategic partnership with the club, decided to invest in the club.

In 2013 the club was promoted to the Orlen Liga and was renamed Klub Piłki Siatkowej (KPS) Chemik Police. Since then the club won four Polish Championships (2013–14, 2014–15, 2015–16, 2016–17), three the Polish Cups (2013–14, 2015–16, 2016–17), two Polish Super Cups (2014, 2015) and finished fourth in the 2014–15 CEV Women's Champions League.

== Honours ==
=== National competitions ===
- Polish Championship: 11

1993–94, 1994–95, 2013–14, 2014–15, 2015–16, 2016–17, 2017-18, 2019-2020, 2020-2021, 2021-2022, 2023-24

- Polish Cup: 10

1992–93, 1993–94, 1994–95, 2013–14, 2015–16, 2016–17, 2018-2019, 2019-2020, 2020-2021, 2022-2023

- Polish Super Cup: 4

2014, 2015, 2019, 2023

== Team ==
2017–2018 squad, as per March 2018.

Number	Player	Position	Height (m)	Weight (kg)	Birth date
1	(Serbia) Bianka Buša	Outside hitter	1.87	74	25 July 1994 (age 30)
3	(United States) Alexandra Holston	Opposite	1.88	73	3 April 1995 (age 29)
4	(Poland) Katarzyna Gajgał-Anioł	Middle blocker	1.91	85	21 September 1981 (age 43)
6	(Poland) Agnieszka Bednarek-Kasza	Middle blocker	1.85	70	20 February 1986 (age 39)
7	(Poland) Malwina Smarzek	Outside hitter	1.91	79	3 June 1996 (age 28)
8	(Poland) Izabela Bełcik	Setter	1.86	70	29 November 1980 (age 44)
11	(Serbia) Stefana Veljković	Middle blocker	1.90	76	9 January 1990 (age 35)
13	(Serbia) Slađana Mirković	Setter	1.85	78	7 October 1995 (age 29)
14	(Poland) Natalia Medrzyk	Outside Hitter	1.84	74	13 January 1992 (age 33)
15	(Bulgaria) Simeonova Strashimira	Middle-Blocker	1.95	78	18 August 1985 (age 39)
17	(Poland) Aleksandra Krzos	Libero	1.81	71	23 June 1989 (age 35)
18	(Poland) Katarzyna Zaroślińska	Opposite	1.87	79	3 February 1987 (age 38)

2016–2017 Team
Number	Player	Position	Height (m)	Weight (kg)	Birth date
1	(Poland) Anna Werblińska	Outside hitter	1.78	65	14 May 1984 (age 40)
2	(Poland) Mariola Zenik	Libero	1.73	67	3 July 1982 (age 42)
3	(Colombia) Madelaynne Montaño	Opposite	1.85	68	6 January 1983 (age 42)
4	(Poland) Katarzyna Gajgał-Anioł	Middle blocker	1.91	85	21 September 1981 (age 43)
6	(Poland) Agnieszka Bednarek-Kasza	Middle blocker	1.85	70	20 February 1986 (age 39)
7	(Poland) Malwina Smarzek	Outside hitter	1.91	79	3 June 1996 (age 28)
8	(Poland) Izabela Bełcik	Setter	1.86	70	29 November 1980 (age 44)
9	(Poland) Magdalena Stysiak	Outside hitter	1.99	80	3 December 2000 (age 24)
11	(Serbia) Stefana Veljković	Middle blocker	1.90	76	9 January 1990 (age 35)
13	(Poland) Nikola Abramajtyz	Middle blocker	1.85	74	13 February 1997 (age 28)
14	(Poland) Joanna Wołosz	Setter	1.81	71	7 April 1990 (age 34)
15	(Serbia) Jelena Blagojević	Outside hitter	1.81	67	1 December 1988 (age 36)
16	(Poland) Aleksandra Jagieło	Outside hitter	1.80	68	2 June 1980 (age 44)
17	(Poland) Aleksandra Krzos	Libero	1.81	71	23 June 1989 (age 35)
18	(Poland) Katarzyna Zaroślińska	Opposite	1.87	79	3 February 1987 (age 38)

2015–2016 Team
Number	Player	Position	Height (m)	Birth date
1	(Poland) Anna Werblińska	Outside Hitter	1.78	14/05/1984
2	(Poland) Mariola Zenik	Libero	1.73	03/07/1982
3	(Colombia) Madelaynne Montaño	Opposite Hitter	1.85	06/01/1983
4	(Poland) Katarzyna Gajgał-Anioł	Middle Blocker	1.90	21/09/1981
6	(Poland) Agnieszka Bednarek-Kasza	Middle Blocker	1.86	20/02/1986
8	(Poland) Izabela Bełcik	Setter	1.85	29/11/1980
9	(Czech Republic) Helena Havelková	Outside Hitter	1.86	25/07/1988
10	(Dominican Republic) Yonkaira Peña	Outside Hitter	1.90	10/05/1993
11	(Serbia) Stefana Veljković	Middle Blocker	1.90	09/01/1990
12	(Poland) Izabela Kowalińska	Opposite Hitter	1.89	23/02/1985
13	(Poland) Katarzyna Mróz	Middle Blocker	1.94	19/02/1981
14	(Poland) Joanna Wołosz	Setter	1.81	07/04/1990
16	(Poland) Aleksandra Jagieło	Outside Hitter	1.80	02/06/1980
19	(Poland) Paulina Maj-Erwardt	Libero	1.66	22/03/1987
