= Agnieszka Bednarek-Kasza =

Polish volleyball player

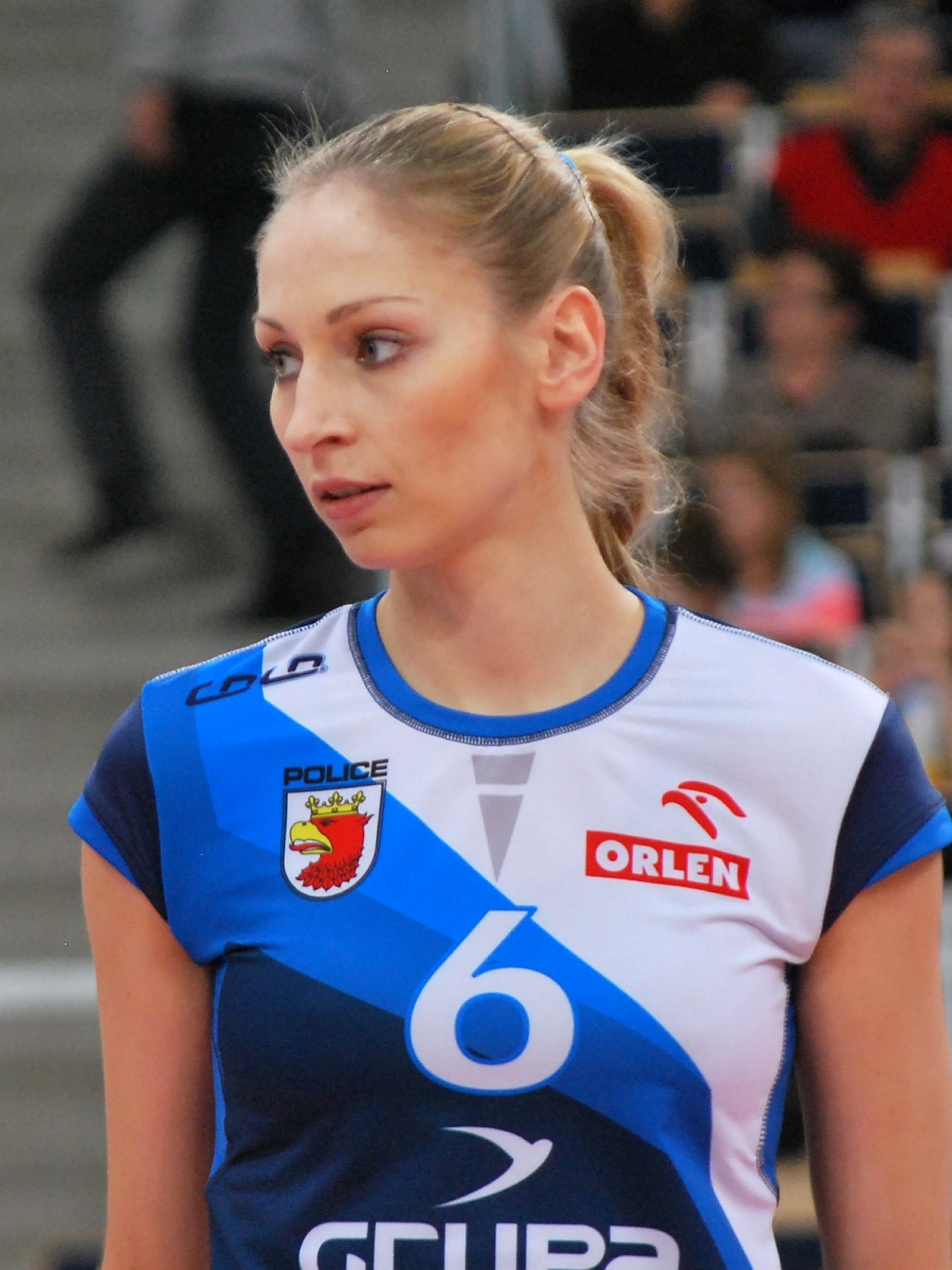

Personal information
- Full name: Agnieszka Bednarek-Kasza
- Nationality: Polish
- Born: 20 February 1986 (age 40); Złotów, Poland
- Height: 1.85 m (6 ft 1 in)
- Weight: 69 kg (152 lb)
- Spike: 310 cm (122 in)
- Block: 295 cm (116 in)

Volleyball information
- Position: Middle blocker
- Current club: (Poland) KPS Chemik Police
- Number: 6

Career
Years	Teams
2005–2009; 2009–2013; 2013–	(Poland) Sparta Złotów (Poland) SMS PZPS Sosnowiec (Poland) Nafta-Gaz Piła (Poland) Muszynianka Muszyna (Poland) KPS Chemik Police

National team
2007–	Poland
Honours
Women's volleyball
Representing Poland
European Championship
Bronze medal – third place	2009 Poland	Team
European Games
Silver medal – second place	2015 Baku	Team
- Last updated: 3 April 2016

Agnieszka Bednarek-Kasza (born 20 February 1986) is a Polish volleyball player, a member of Poland women's national volleyball team and Polish club KPS Chemik Police, a participant of the Olympic Games Beijing 2008, bronze medalist of the European Championship 2009, Polish Champion (2011, 2014).

== Personal life ==
On 20 June 2010 she married Wojciech Kasza.

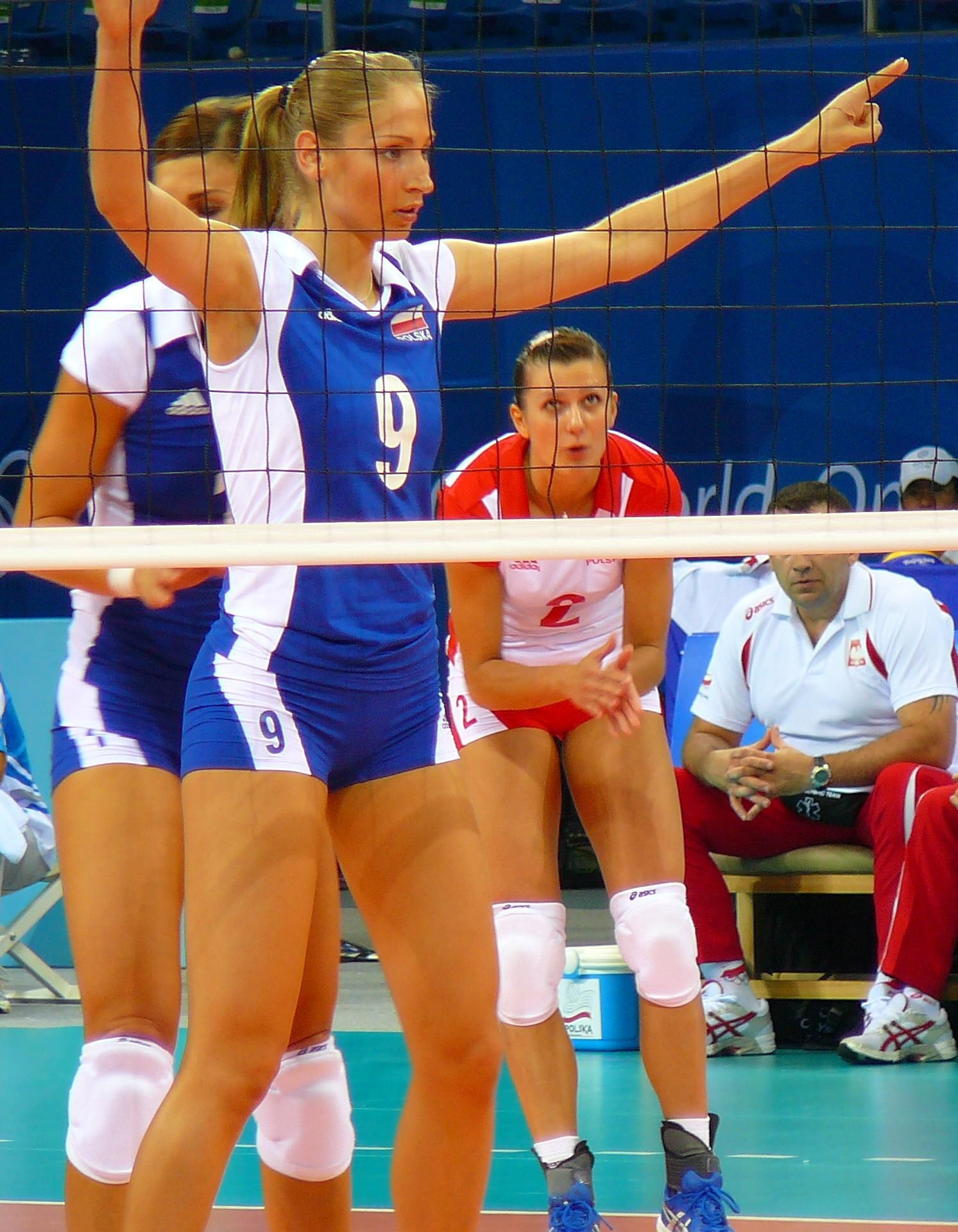
Agnieszka Bednarek during the match at Olympic Games Beijing 2008.

== Career ==
In 2013 moved to KPS Chemik Police. On 9 March 2014 Bednarek-Kasza and her teammates achieved Polish Cup 2014. In the same season she won her second title of Polish Champion. On 28 September 2014 KPS Chemik Police, including Bednarek-Kasza, beat Polski Cukier Muszynianka Fakro Bank BPS Muszyna and won first trophy in season 2014/2015 - Polish SuperCup 2014. She took part in 1st edition of European Games. In semi final her national team beat Serbia and qualified to final match. On 27 June 2015 Poland was beaten by Turkey and Bednarek-Kasza with her teammates achieved silver medal.

== Sporting achievements ==
=== Clubs ===
==== CEV Cup ====
- 2012/2013 - with Muszynianka Fakro Muszyna

==== National championships ====
- 2005/2006 Polish Championship, with PTPS Farmutil Piła
- 2006/2007 Polish Championship, with PTPS Farmutil Piła
- 2007/2008 Polish Cup, with PTPS Farmutil Piła
- 2007/2008 Polish Championship, with PTPS Farmutil Piła
- 2008/2009 Polish Championship, with PTPS Farmutil Piła
- 2009/2010 Polish SuperCup 2009, with Muszynianka Fakro Muszyna
- 2009/2010 Polish Championship, with Muszynianka Fakro Muszyna
- 2010/2011 Polish Cup, with Muszynianka Fakro Muszyna
- 2010/2011 Polish Championship, with Muszynianka Fakro Muszyna
- 2011/2012 Polish SuperCup 2011, with Muszynianka Fakro Muszyna
- 2011/2012 Polish Championship, with Muszynianka Fakro Muszyna
- 2012/2013 Polish Championship, with Muszynianka Fakro Muszyna
- 2013/2014 Polish Cup, with KPS Chemik Police
- 2013/2014 Polish Championship, with KPS Chemik Police
- 2014/2015 Polish SuperCup 2014, with KPS Chemik Police

=== National team ===
- 2009 CEV European Championship
- 2015 European Games

=== Individually ===
- 2009 CEV European Championship - Best Server
