= Izabela Kowalińska =

Polish volleyball player (born 1985)

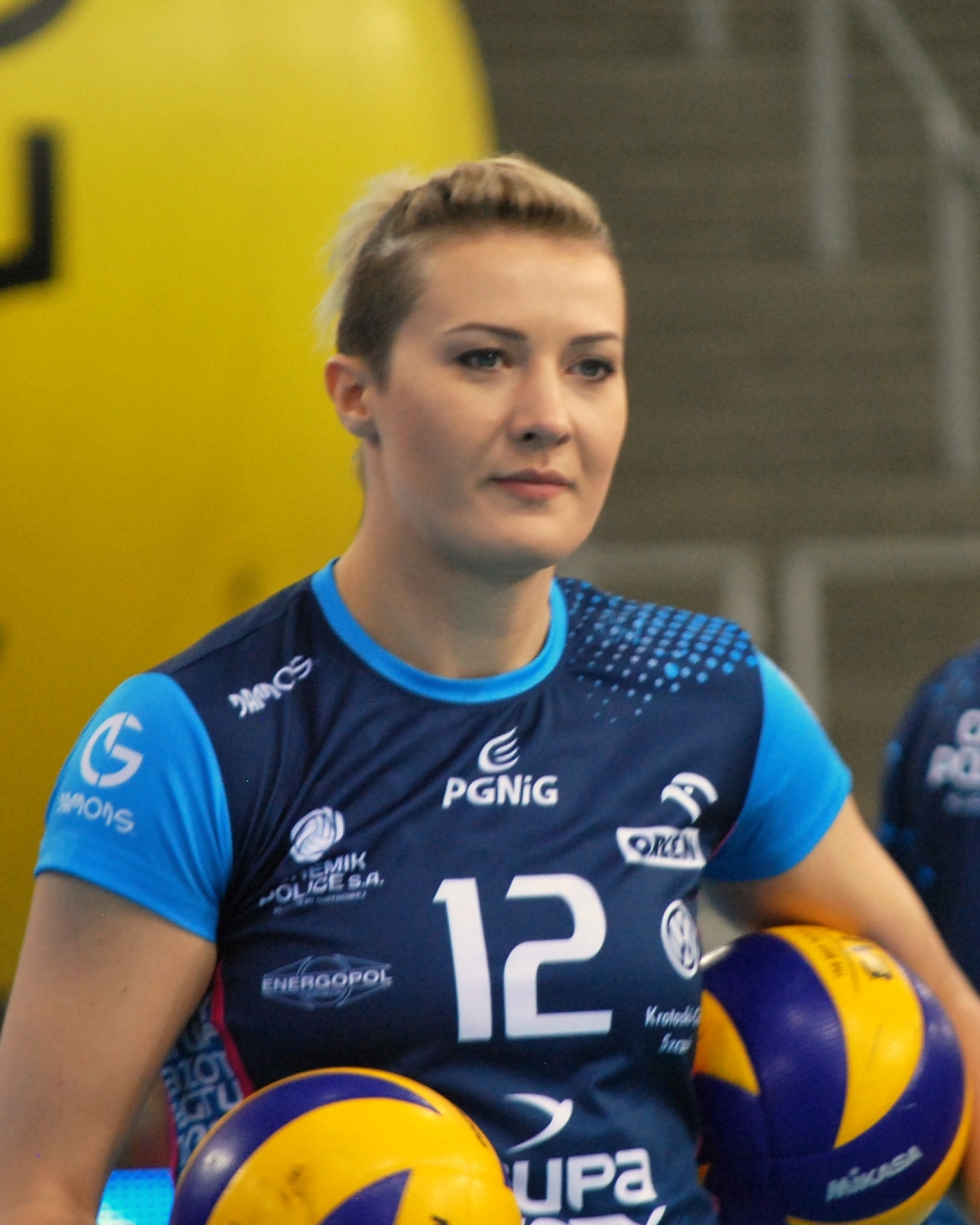
- Izabela Kowalińska

Personal information
- Full name: Izabela Żebrowska Kowalińska
- Nationality: Polish
- Born: 23 February 1985 (age 41); Świdnik, Poland
- Height: 189 cm (74 in)
- Weight: 84 kg (185 lb)
- Spike: 312 cm (123 in)
- Block: 291 cm (115 in)

Volleyball information
- Position: Opposite
- Number: 12 (national team)

Career
Teams
	(Poland) Chemik Police

National team
2003, 2015	Poland

Izabela Żebrowska Kowalińska (born 23 February 1985) is a Polish volleyball player, playing as an opposite. She is part of the Poland women's national volleyball team.

She participated in the 2002 FIVB Volleyball Women's World Championship, and the 2003 FIVB Women's World Cup. She competed at the 2015 Women's European Volleyball Championship. On club level she plays for Chemik Police.
