= Aleksandra Krzos =

Polish volleyball player (born 1989)

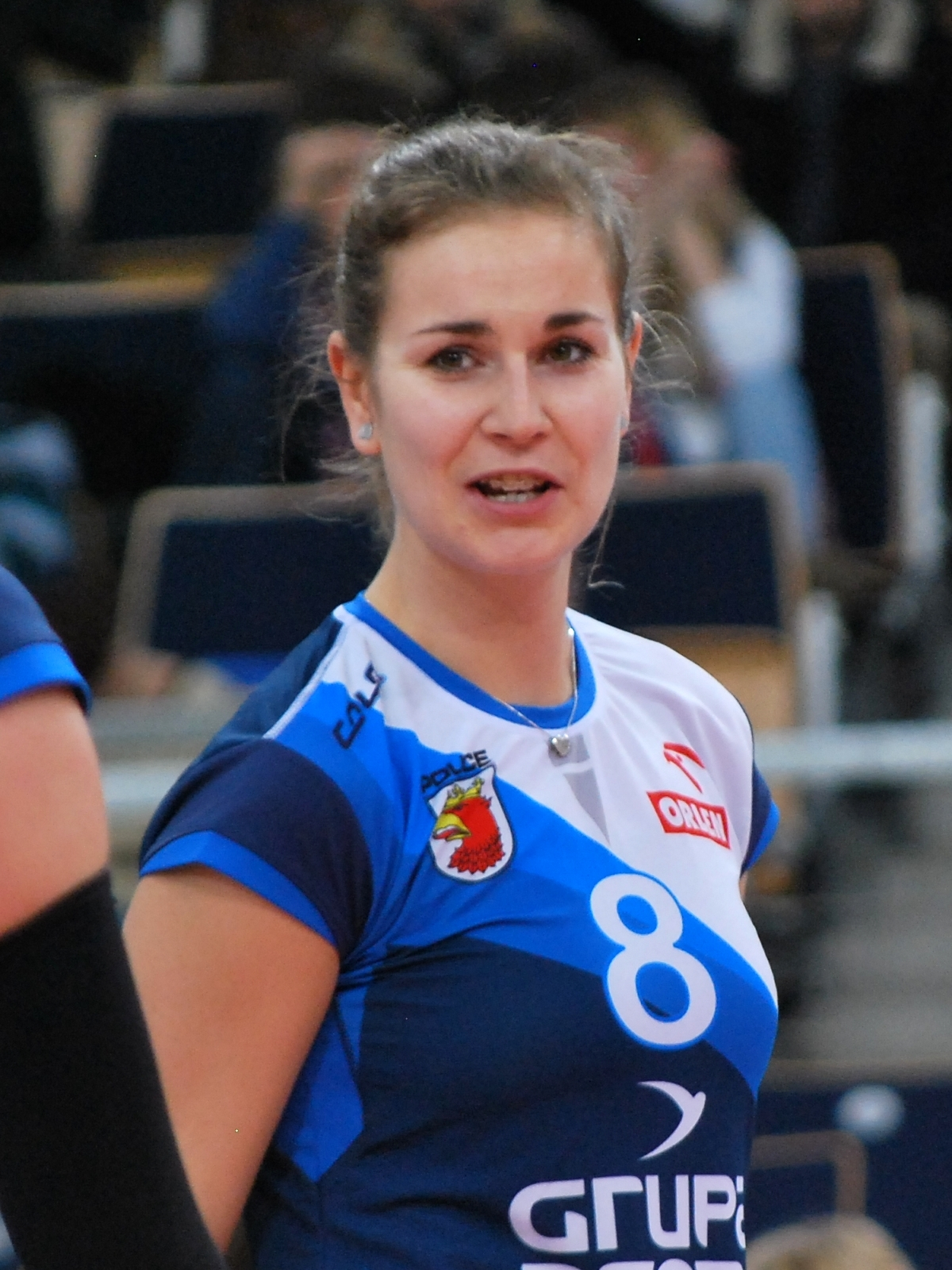

Personal information
- Nationality: Polish
- Born: 23 June 1989 (age 37)
- Height: 181 cm (71 in)
- Weight: 71 kg (157 lb)
- Spike: 275 cm (108 in)
- Block: 260 cm (102 in)

Volleyball information
- Number: 1 (national team)

Career
- Years: Team
- 2015: KPS Chemik Police

National team
- Years: Team
- 2015: Poland

Aleksandra Krzos (born 23 June 1989) is a Polish volleyball player. She is part of the Poland women's national volleyball team.

She participated in the 2015 FIVB Volleyball World Grand Prix. On club level she played for KPS Chemik Police in 2015.
