= Stefana Veljković =

Serbian volleyball player (born 1990)

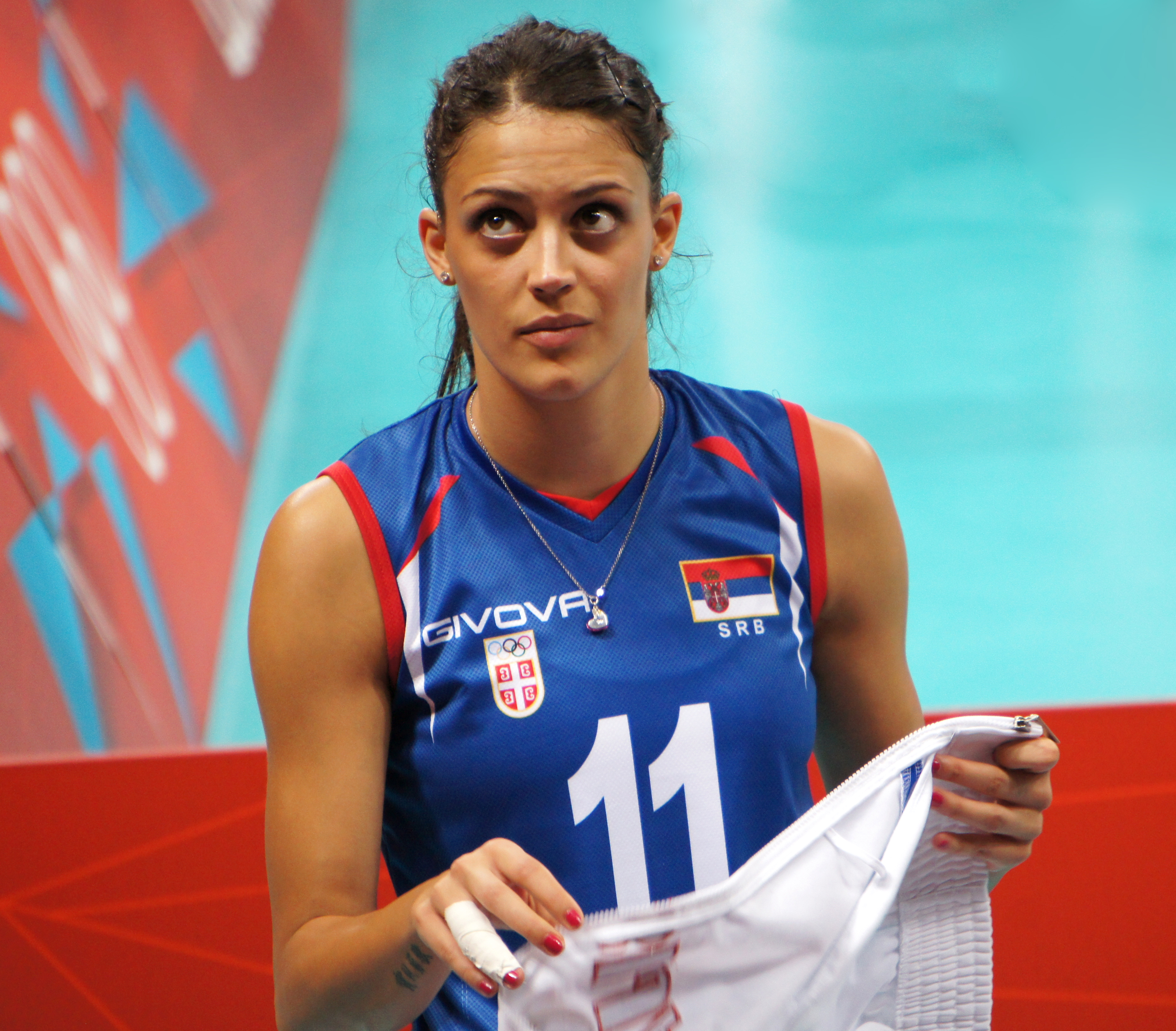
- Stefana Veljković at London 2012.

Personal information
- Nationality: Serbian
- Born: 9 January 1990 (age 36); Svetozarevo, SR Serbia, SFR Yugoslavia
- Height: 1.90 m (6 ft 3 in)
- Weight: 76 kg (168 lb)
- Spike: 320 cm (126 in)
- Block: 305 cm (120 in)

Volleyball information
- Position: Middle blocker

Career
Years	Teams
2001–2004; 2004–2008; 2008–2010; 2010–2012; 2012–2013; 2013–2014; 2014–2018; 2018–2020; 2020–2021	OK Jagodina; Postar 064 Belgrade; OK Crvena Zvezda; Asystel Novara; Asystel MC Carnaghi; Galatasaray İstanbul; Chemik Police; AGIL Novara pause (pregnancy)

National team
2008-2021	Serbia
Honours
Volleyball
Olympic Games
Silver medal – second place	2016 Rio de Janeiro	Team
World Championship
Gold medal – first place	2018 Japan	Team
European Championship
Gold medal – first place	2017 Azerbaijan/Georgia
Gold medal – first place	2019 Turkey
Silver medal – second place	2021 Serbia/Croatia/Bulgaria/Romania
Bronze medal – third place	2015 Netherlands/Belgium
World Cup
Silver medal – second place	2015 Japan
FIVB World Grand Prix
Bronze medal – third place	2013 Sapporo
Bronze medal – third place	2017 Nanjing
European League
Gold medal – first place	2010 Ankara
Universiade
Silver medal – second place	2009 Belgrade	Team

Stefana Veljković (Serbian Cyrillic: Стефана Вељковић; born 9 January 1990, in Svetozarevo) is a Serbian volleyball player who competed in the 2008, 2012 and 2016 Summer Olympics. In 2016, she won the silver medal with the Serbian team. With the Serbian team, she also won the 2018 FIVB Volleyball Women's World Championship.

== Awards ==
=== Clubs ===
- 2015–16 Polish Volleyball League — Champion, with KPS Chemik Police
- 2016–17 Polish Volleyball League — Champion, with KPS Chemik Police
- 2017–18 Polish Volleyball League — Champion, with KPS Chemik Police
- 2018–19 CEV Champions League — Champion, with AGIL Volley
- 2018–19 Italian Volleyball Cup — Champion, with AGIL Volley

=== Individual ===
- 2009–10 CEV Cup Final Four "Best server"
- 2017 European Championship "Best Middle Blocker"
