= Sparta Złotów =

Polish sports club

MKS Sparta Złotów is a Polish multi-sports club based in Złotów, founded in 1928.

== Sections ==
The club provides seven sections:

- Association football - as of the 2024–25 season, the men's team plays in the regional league. The women's team formerly played in the Ekstraliga, Poland's highest league.
- Volleyball - the women's team plays in the III liga.
- Badminton
- Athletics
- Table tennis
- Boxing
- Aikido

== History ==
he most notable former players include Paulina Maj, Wanda Wiecha (volleyball) and Jakub Wawrzyniak (football), former national team players.
