= Aleksandra Jagieło =

Polish volleyball player

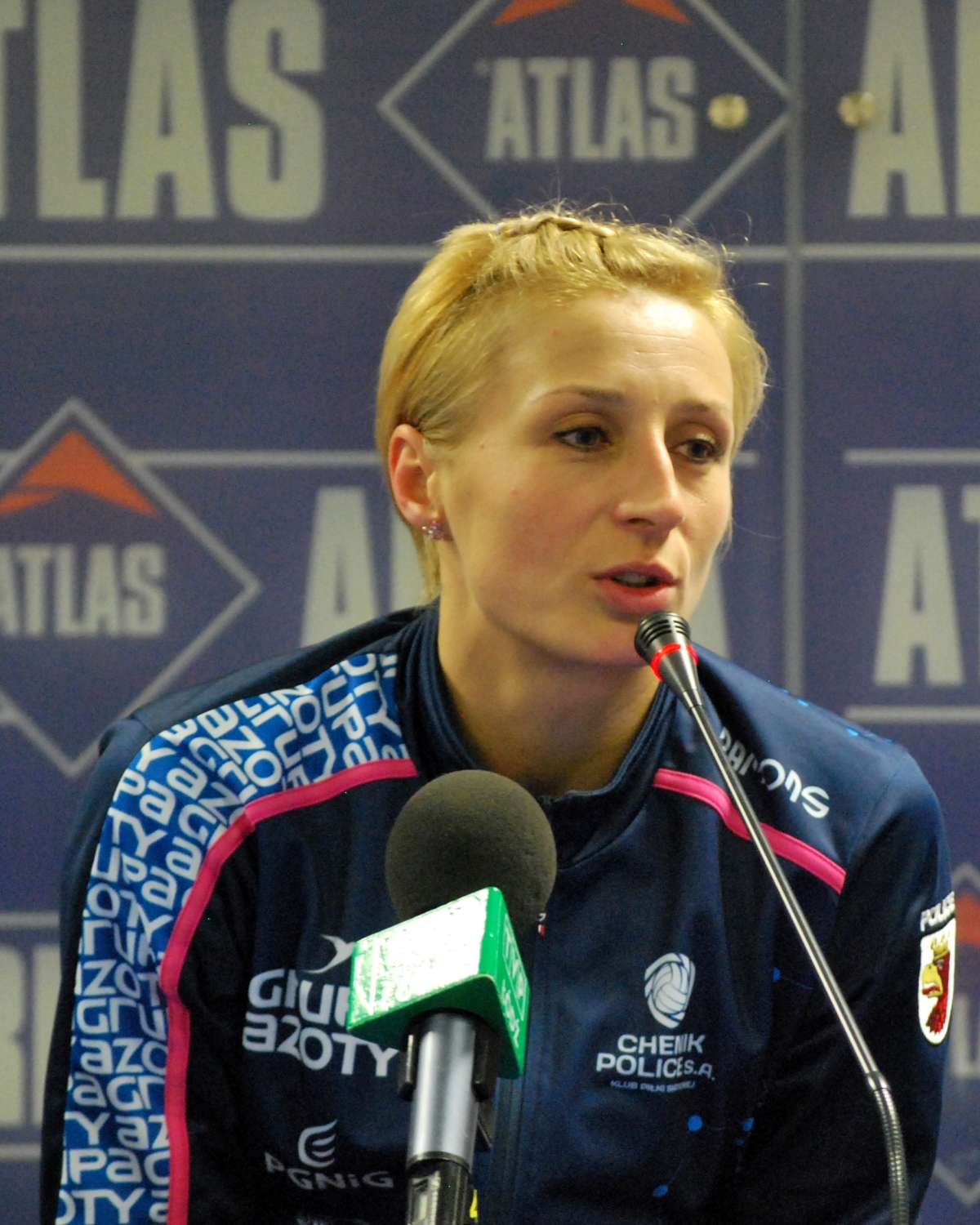
- updated=

Personal information
- Full name: Aleksandra Katarzyna Jagieło
- Nationality: Polish
- Born: 2 June 1980 (age 46)

National team
2000–2010	Poland
Honours
Representing Poland
European Championship
Gold medal – first place	2003 Turkey

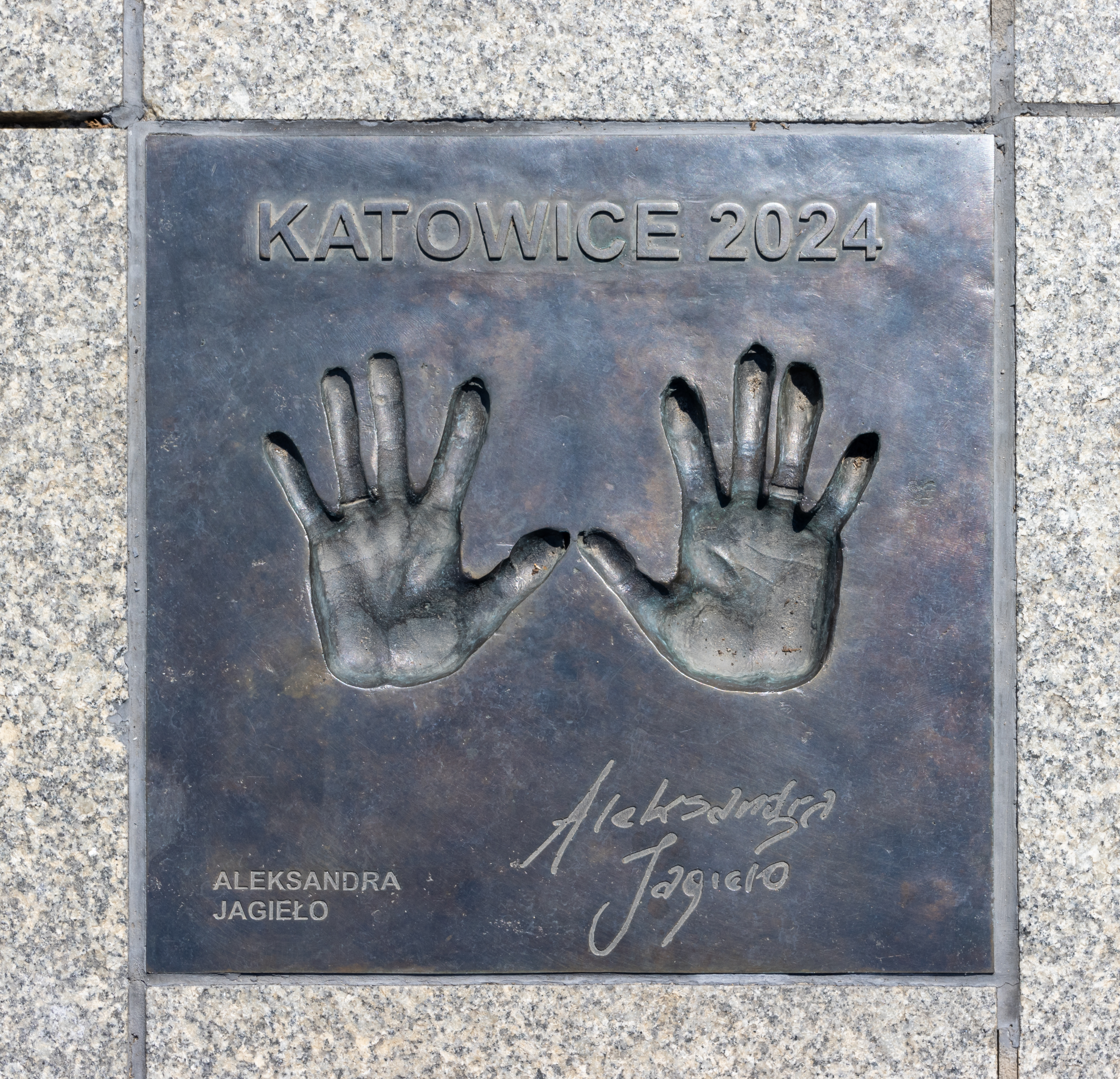
Hand prints and signature at the Avenue of Volleyball Stars, Katowice

Aleksandra Katarzyna Jagieło (born Aleksandra Przybysz 2 June 1980 Nisko ) is a Polish volleyball player. In October 2021, she became a member of the PZPS Board for women's volleyball.

From 2000 to 2010, she played 283 matches for the Poland women's national volleyball team She competed in the 2003 Women's European Volleyball Championship and 2005 Women’s European Volleyball Championship, and 2009 Women's European Volleyball Championship, winning the bronze medal.

== Clubs ==
She joined the ranks of BKS Stal Bielsko-Biała, Rebecchi River Volley Rivergaro, from 2007 to 2011 Muszynianka Fakro Muszyna.

In May 2012, she returned to the club from Muszyna. In the 2014 to 2015 season she performed in Chemik Police. In the 2017 to 2018 season, she played for BKS PROFI CREDIT Bielsko-Biała.
