= Katarzyna Gajgał-Anioł =

Polish volleyball player (born 1981)

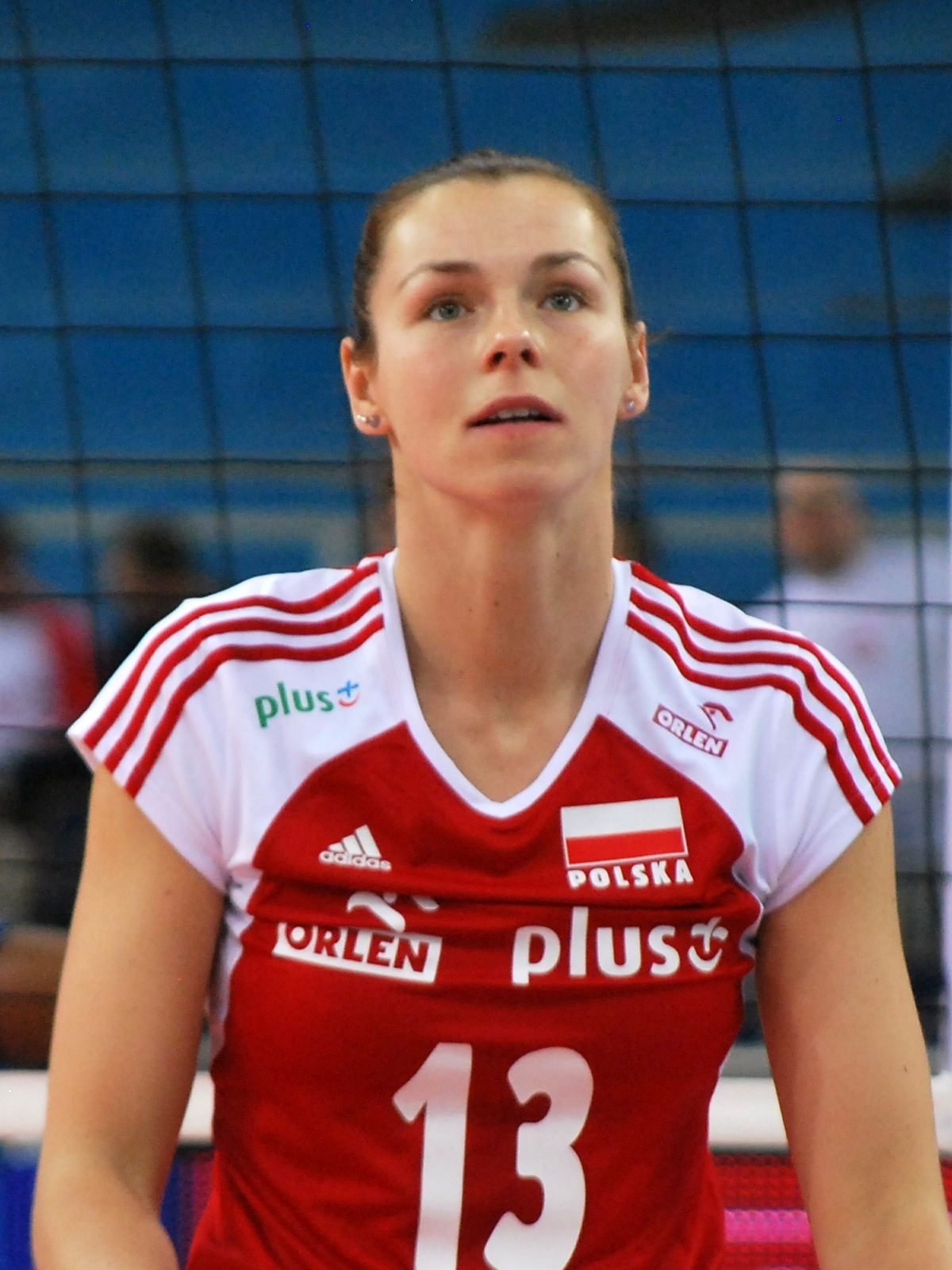

Personal information
- Full name: Katarzyna Gajgał-Anioł (née Biel)
- Nationality: Polish
- Born: 21 September 1981 (age 45); Dębica, Poland
- Height: 1.91 m (6 ft 3 in)
- Weight: 83 kg (183 lb)
- Spike: 308 cm (121 in)
- Block: 287 cm (113 in)

Volleyball information
- Position: Middle blocker
- Current team: (Poland) KPS Chemik Police
- Number: 4 (club), 15 (national team)

Career
| Years | Teams |
|---|---|
| 1996–1999; 1999–2009; 2009–2010; 2010–2013; 2013– | (Poland) MKS Lubań Śląski (Poland) SMS PZPS Sosnowiec (Poland) BKS Stal Bielsko-Biała (Poland) MKS Dąbrowa Górnicza (Poland) Muszynianka Muszyna (Poland) KPS Chemik Police |

National team
| 2003–2014 | Poland |
Honours
Representing Poland
Women's volleyball
European Championship
| Bronze medal – third place | 2009 Poland |
- Last updated: 11 June 2015

Katarzyna Gajgał-Anioł (née Biel) (born 21 September 1981) is a Polish volleyball player, a member of Poland women's national volleyball team in 2003–14 and Polish club KPS Chemik Police, a participant of the Olympic Games Beijing 2008, bronze medalist of European Championship 2009, four-time Polish Champion (2004, 2011, 2014, 2015).

== Personal life ==
She married on 9 July 2005. On 23 January 2007 she gave birth to a son named Filip. On 2 June 2012 she married Radosław Anioł, and it is her second marriage.

== Career ==
=== National team ===
In October 2009 she won with teammates the bronze medal of European Championship 2009 after winning the match against Germany.

== Sporting achievements ==
=== Clubs ===
==== National championships ====
- 1999/2000 Polish Championship, with BKS Stal Bielsko-Biała
- 2002/2003 Polish Championship, with BKS Stal Bielsko-Biała
- 2003/2004 Polish Cup, with BKS Stal Bielsko-Biała
- 2003/2004 Polish Championship, with BKS Stal Bielsko-Biała
- 2005/2006 Polish Cup, with BKS Stal Bielsko-Biała
- 2008/2009 Polish Cup, with BKS Stal Bielsko-Biała
- 2008/2009 Polish Championship, with BKS Stal Bielsko-Biała
- 2009/2010 Polish Championship, with Enionem Energia MKS Dąbrowa Górnicza
- 2010/2011 Polish Cup, with Bank BPS Muszynianka Fakro Muszyna
- 2010/2011 Polish Championship, with Bank BPS Muszynianka Fakro Muszyna
- 2011/2012 Polish SuperCup 2011, with Bank BPS Muszynianka Fakro Muszyna
- 2011/2012 Polish Championship, with Bank BPS Muszynianka Fakro Muszyna
- 2012/2013 Polish Championship, with Bank BPS Muszynianka Fakro Muszyna
- 2013/2014 Polish Cup, with KPS Chemik Police
- 2013/2014 Polish Championship, with KPS Chemik Police
- 2014/2015 Polish SuperCup 2014, with KPS Chemik Police
- 2014/2015 Polish Championship, with KPS Chemik Police

=== National team ===
- 2005 Universiade
- 2009 CEV European Championship
