= 2015–16 Nemzeti Bajnokság I (disambiguation) =

The 2015–16 Nemzeti Bajnokság I, or NB I, was the 117th season of top-tier football in Hungary.

2015–16 Nemzeti Bajnokság I may also refer to:

- 2015–16 Nemzeti Bajnokság I (men's handball)
- 2015–16 Nemzeti Bajnokság I (men's volleyball)
- 2015–16 Nemzeti Bajnokság I (women's handball)
- 2015–16 Nemzeti Bajnokság I (women's volleyball)

== See also ==
- 2015–16 Nemzeti Bajnokság I/A (men's basketball)
- 2015–16 Nemzeti Bajnokság I/A (women's basketball)
