= 2016–17 Nemzeti Bajnokság I (women's volleyball) =

2015–16 Női Röplabda NB I
- League: Nemzeti Bajnokság I
- Sport: Women's volleyball
- Duration: October 21, 2016 – April 24, 2017
- Teams: 11
- TV partner: M4 Sport

Finals
- Champions: Békéscsabai RSE (4th title)
- Runners-up: Vasas-Óbuda

Nemzeti Bajnokság I seasons
- 2015–16 2017–18

2016–17 NB I is the 72nd season of the Hungarian Championship (Nemzeti Bajnokság I) organized under the supervision of Magyar Röplabda Szövetség (MRSZ).

== Team information ==
Location of teams in 2016–17 Nemzeti Bajnokság I

The following 11 clubs compete in the NB I during the 2016–17 season:

Team	Location	Arena	Position 2015–16
Békéscsabai RSE	Békéscsaba	Városi Sportcsarnok	Champion
Budaörsi DSE	Budaörs	Illyés Gyula Gimnázium és KSZKI	10th
Gödöllői RC	Gödöllő	SZIE Sportcsarnok	6th
Jászberényi RK	Jászberény	Belvárosi Általános Iskola	4th
Kaposvári NRC	Kaposvár	Kaposvári Sportcsarnok	8th
MTK Budapest	Budapest	MTK Röplabda Csarnok	5th
Fatum-Nyíregyháza	Nyíregyháza	Bujtosi Szabadidő Csarnok	7th
Palota RSC	Budapest	Sződliget utcai Csarnok	1st (NB II East)
TF SE	Budapest	TF "D" terem	9th
Újpesti TE	Budapest	Tungsram Csarnok	Third place
Vasas-Óbuda	Budapest	Folyandár Sport és Táncközpont	Runner-up

== Regular season ==
Pos	Team	Pld	W	L	Pts	SW	SL	SR	SPW	SPL	SPR	Qualification
1	Linamar BRSE	20	20	0	60	60	4	15.000	0	0	—	Play–off
2	Vasas Óbuda	20	17	3	48	51	17	3.000	0	0	—	Play–off
3	Fatum-Nyíregyháza	20	16	4	48	51	17	3.000	0	0	—	Play–off
4	Jászberényi RK	20	13	7	38	41	26	1.577	0	0	—	Play–off
5	MTK Budapest	20	12	8	37	41	29	1.414	0	0	—	Play–off
6	UTE	20	11	9	33	40	33	1.212	0	0	—	Play–off
7	1. MCM-Diamant KE	20	8	12	25	31	41	0.756	0	0	—	Play–off
8	Penta Gödöllői RC	20	7	13	23	29	41	0.707	0	0	—	Play–off
9	TFSE	20	3	17	10	14	53	0.264	0	0	—	Relegation round
10	Budaörsi DSE	20	3	17	8	15	53	0.283	0	0	—	Relegation round
11	Palota RSC	20	0	20	0	1	60	0.017	0	0	—	Relegation round

Updated to match(es) played on 13 March 2017. Source:

=== Results ===
Home \ Away	BDS	BRS	GRC	JBR	KAP	MTK	NYÍ	PRS	TFS	UTE	VAS
Budaörsi DSE		0–3	1–3	0–3	1–3	1–3	0–3	3–0	1–3	0–3	0–3
Linamar BRSE	3–0		3–1	3–0	3–0	3–0	3–1	3–0	3–0	3–0	3–0
Penta Gödöllői RC	3–1	0–3		0–3	2–3	0–3	1–3	3–0	3–0	2–3	0–3
Jászberényi RK	3–0	1–3	3–1		3–0	3–1	1–3	3–0	3–0	3–1	0–3
1. MCM-Diamant KE	3–1	1–3	0–3	0–3		1–3	0–3	3–0	3–0	1–3	0–3
MTK Budapest	3–0	0–3	3–0	2–3	0–3		2–3	3–0	3–0	3–2	3–0
Fatum-Nyíregyháza	3–0	0–3	3–0	3–0	3–0	3–0		3–0	3–0	3–0	0–3
Palota RSC	0–3	0–3	0–3	0–3	0–3	0–3	0–3		1–3	0–3	0–3
TFSE	2–3	0–3	0–3	0–3	1–3	0–3	0–3	3–0		1–3	1–3
UTE	3–0	0–3	3–0	3–0	3–2	1–3	1–3	3–0	3–0		0–3
Vasas Óbuda	3–0	0–3	3–1	3–0	3–2	3–0	3–2	3–0	3–0	3–2	

Legend: Blue = home team win; Red = away team win.

== Playoff ==
The eight teams that finished in the places 1 to 8 in the Regular season, compete in the Playoff (1–8).

Quarter-finals
1	Linamar BRSE	2
8	Penta Gödöllői RC	0
4	Jászberényi RK	2
5	MTK Budapest	0
2	Vasas Óbuda	2
7	1. MCM-Diamant KE	0
3	Fatum-Nyíregyháza	2
6	UTE	0

Semi-finals
1	Linamar BRSE	3
4	Jászberényi RK	0
2	Vasas Óbuda	3
3	Fatum-Nyíregyháza	1

Finals
1	Linamar BRSE	3
2	Vasas Óbuda	0
Third place
3	Fatum-Nyíregyháza	3
4	Jászberényi RK	1

=== Final ===
In the Playoff's final the two qualified teams play against each other in a series where the team winning three games will become the 2016–17 NB I championship. The team that finished in the higher Regular season place will be played the first, the third and the fifth (if it is necessary) game of the series at home.

Linamar BRSE – Vasas Óbuda (3–0)

Date	Time		Score		Set 1	Set 2	Set 3	Set 4	Set 5	Total	Report
17 Apr	18:00	Linamar BRSE	3–0	Vasas Óbuda	25–15	25–18	25–20	—	—	75–53	Report
20 Apr	20:15	Vasas Óbuda	1–3	Linamar BRSE	13–25	18–25	25–23	13–25	—	69–98	Report
24 Apr	19:00	Linamar BRSE	3–0	Vasas Óbuda	25–20	25–17	25–14	—	—	75–51	Report

== Season statistics ==
=== Number of teams by counties ===
Pos.	County (megye)	No. of teams	Teams
1	Budapest (capital)	5	MTK, Palota RSC, TF SE, Újpesti TE and Vasas-Óbuda
2	Pest	2	Budaörsi DSE and Gödöllői RC
3	Békés	1	Békéscsabai RSE
3	Jász-Nagykun-Szolnok	1	Jászberényi RK
3	Somogy	1	Kaposvári NRC
3	Szabolcs-Szatmár-Bereg	1	Fatum-Nyíregyháza

== Final standings ==
Qualified for the 2017–18 CEV Cup
Qualified for the 2017–18 CEV Challenge Cup
Relegated to the 2017–18 NB II

Pos	Team
1st place, gold medalist(s)	Linamar-BRSE
2nd place, silver medalist(s)	Vasas Óbuda
3rd place, bronze medalist(s)	Fatum-Nyíregyháza
4	Jászberényi RK
5	UTE
6	MTK Budapest
7	1. MCM-Diamant KE
8	Penta Gödöllői RC
9	Budaörsi DSE
10	TFSE
11	Palota RSC
