= 2015–16 Nemzeti Bajnokság I (women's volleyball) =

- League: NB I
- Sport: Volleyball
- Duration: 2015 - 2016
- Teams: 12
- TV partner: M4 Sport

NB I seasons
- 2014–15 2016–17

The 2015–16 Nemzeti Bajnokság I is the 71st season of the Nemzeti Bajnokság I, Hungary's premier Volleyball league.

== Team information ==
Location of teams in 2014-15 Nemzeti Bajnokság I

The following 12 clubs compete in the NB I during the 2015–16 season:

Team	Location	Arena	Position 2014-15
Békéscsaba	Békéscsaba	Városi Sportcsarnok	Champion
Budaörs	Budaörs	Illyés Gyula Gimnázium és KSZKI	
Gödöllő	Gödöllő	SZIE Sportcsarnok	4th
Jászberény	Jászberény	Belvárosi Általános Iskola	
Kaposvár	Kaposvár	Kaposvári Sportcsarnok	
Miskolci VSC	Miskolc	Csokonai úti csarnok	
MTK	Budapest	MTK Röplabda Csarnok	
Nyírsuli	Nyíregyháza	Bujtosi Szabadidő Csarnok	
TF	Budapest	TF "D" terem	
Újpest	Budapest	Tungsram Csarnok	Third place
Vasas	Budapest	Folyandár Sport és Táncközpont	Runner-up

== Playoffs ==
Teams in bold won the playoff series. Numbers to the left of each team indicate the team's original playoff seeding. Numbers to the right indicate the score of each playoff game.

Quarterfinals
1	**Linamar BRSE**	**3**	**3**
8	1. MCM-Diamant KE	0	0
4	**Jászberényi RK**	**3**	0	**3**
5	MTK Budapest	2	**3**	0
2	**Vasas Óbuda**	**3**	**3**
7	Fatum-Nyíregyháza	2	1
3	**UTE**	**3**	**3**
6	TEVA Gödöllő	0	1

Semifinals
1	**Linamar BRSE**	**3**	**3**	**3**
4	Jászberényi RK	0	0	0
2	**Vasas Óbuda**	**3**	**3**	1	1	**3**
3	UTE	1	1	**3**	**3**	0

Final
1	Linamar BRSE	**3**	**3**
2	Vasas Óbuda	1	0
Third place
3	UTE	**3**	2
4	Jászberényi RK	0	**3**

=== Final ===
(to 3 victories)

Date	Time		Score		Set 1	Set 2	Set 3	Set 4	Set 5	Total	Report
18 Apr	18:00	**Linamar BRSE**	**3–1**	Vasas Óbuda	25–14	23–25	30–28	25–15		**103–82**	
21 Apr	18:00	Vasas Óbuda	**0–3**	**Linamar BRSE**	20–25	15–25	17–25			**52–75**	
26 Apr	17:00	Linamar BRSE	–	Vasas Óbuda	–	–	–	–	–	**0–0**	
Apr	20:30	Asseco Resovia Rzeszów	–	ZAKSA Kędzierzyn-Koźle	–	–	–	–	–	**0–0**	
May	18:00	ZAKSA Kędzierzyn-Koźle	–	Asseco Resovia Rzeszów	–	–	–	–	–	**0–0**	

== Hungarian clubs in European competitions ==
Women's CEV Cup

- Linamar-Békéscsabai RSE

Round	Club	Home	Away
16th Final	(Greece) Olympiacos	3 - 1	3 - 1
8th Final	(Russia) Dinamo Krasnodar	0 - 3	0 - 3

CEV Women's Challenge Cup

- Vasas Óbuda

Round		Club	Home	Away
QP	2nd Round	(Austria) UVC Holding Graz	3 - 1	3 - 0
16th Final		(Greece) Olympiacos	1 - 3	0 - 3

- TEVA Gödöllő

Round		Club	Home	Away
QP	2nd Round	(Croatia) Mladost Zagreb	0 - 3	0 - 3

- Fatum-Nyíregyháza

Round		Club	Home	Away
QP	2nd Round	(Serbia) Jedinstvo Stara Pazova	1 - 3	1 - 3
