= 2014–15 Nemzeti Bajnokság I (women's volleyball) =

NB I 2014–15
- League: Nemzeti Bajnokság I
- Sport: volleyball
- Duration: 26 September 2014 – 22 February 2015 (regular season)
- Teams: 12

Summary

NB I seasons
- ← 2013–14 2015–16 →

The 2014–15 Nemzeti Bajnokság I is the 70th season of the Nemzeti Bajnokság I, Hungary's premier Volleyball league.

== Team information ==
Location of teams in 2014-15 Nemzeti Bajnokság I

The following 12 clubs compete in the NB I during the 2014–15 season:

Team	Location	Arena	Position 2013-14
Békéscsaba	Békéscsaba	Városi Sportcsarnok	1st
Budaörs	Budaörs	Illyés Gyula Gimnázium és KSZKI	1st (NB II) West
Gödöllő	Gödöllő	SZIE Sportcsarnok	3rd
Jászberény	Jászberény	Belvárosi Általános Iskola	1st (NB II) East
Kaposvár	Kaposvár	Kaposvári Sportcsarnok	8th
Miskolci VSC	Miskolc	Csokonai úti csarnok	9th
MTK	Budapest	MTK Röplabda Csarnok	5th
Nyírsuli	Nyíregyháza	Bujtosi Szabadidő Csarnok	7th
Palota RSC	Budapest	Sződliget utcai tornaterem	10th
TF	Budapest	TF "D" terem	4th
Újpest	Budapest	Tungsram Csarnok	6th
Vasas	Budapest	Folyandár Sport és Táncközpont	2nd

== Regular season ==
=== Standings ===
#	Team	P	W	Wx3-2	Lx3-2	L	Sets	Pts	Qualification or relegation
1	Vasas-Óbuda	22	17	3	1	1	62:18	58	Championship playoff
2	TEVA Gödöllői RC	22	17	1	2	2	60:19	55	Championship playoff
3	Linamar-BRSE	22	16	1	3	2	59:20	53	Championship playoff
4	Aluprof-TF-Budapest	22	13	1	2	6	49:37	43	Championship playoff
5	UTE	22	11	5	0	6	50:33	42	Championship playoff
6	Fatum-Nyírsuli	22	10	3	1	8	44:37	37	Championship playoff
7	Jászberényi RK	22	9	0	4	9	38:43	31	Championship playoff
8	MCM-Diamant-Kaposvár	22	9	1	1	11	38:39	30	Championship playoff
9	MTK Budapest	22	7	1	2	12	31:46	25	Relegation Round
10	Budaörsi DSE	22	3	0	2	17	14:60	11	Relegation Round
11	Albrecht MVSC-MISI	22	1	2	0	19	15:61	7	Relegation Round
12	Palota RSC	22	1	0	0	21	8:64	3	Relegation Round

== Championship playoff ==
Teams in bold won the playoff series. Numbers to the left of each team indicate the team's original playoff seeding. Numbers to the right indicate the score of each playoff game.

Quarterfinals
1	**Vasas-Óbuda**	**3**	**3**	–	–
8	MCM-Diamant-Kaposvár	0	0	–	–
4	Aluprof-TF-Budapest	**3**	1	0	1
5	**UTE**	1	**3**	**3**	**3**
2	**TEVA Gödöllői RC**	**3**	**3**	–	–
7	Jászberényi RK	0	1	–	–
3	**Linamar-BRSE**	**3**	**3**	**3**
6	Fatum-Nyíregyháza	1	2	2

Semifinals
1	**Vasas-Óbuda**
5	UTE
2	TEVA Gödöllői RC	1
3	**Linamar-BRSE**	**3**

Final
1	Vasas-Óbuda	2	0	**3**	1
3	**Linamar-BRSE**	**3**	**3**	2	**3**
Third place
2	TEVA Gödöllői RC	0	0	**3**	1
5	**UTE**	**3**	**3**	1	**3**

== Final standing ==
Qualified for the 2015–16 CEV Cup
Qualified for the 2015–16 CEV Challenge Cup
Relegation to the 2014–15 NB II

Rank	Team
1st place, gold medalist(s)	Linamar-BRSE
2nd place, silver medalist(s)	Vasas-Óbuda
3rd place, bronze medalist(s)	UTE
4	TEVA Gödöllői RC
5	Fatum-Nyíregyháza
6	Aluprof-TF-Budapest
7	Jászberényi RK
8	MCM-Diamant-Kaposvár
9	MTK Budapest
10	Albrecht MVSC-MISI
11	Budaörsi DSE
12	Palota RSC

2014–15 NB I Champions
**Linamar-BRSE**
**2nd title**

Fanni Bagyinka, Dorottya Bodnár, Andrea Gyenge, Bettina Ilyés, Ivana Radonjić
Dorottya Kanizsai, Ildikó Korniss, Ali Skayhan, Rita Molcsányi, Viktória Nagy
Sarah Clement, Nikolett Soós, Renáta Szpin
**Head coach**
Mihály Kormos
