= Péter Nagy =

Péter Nagy or Peter Nagy may refer to:

- Peter Nagy (artist) (1959–2026), American artist and gallery owner in India
- Peter Nagy (canoeist) (1964–2021), Slovak slalom canoeist
- Peter Nagy (singer) (born 1959), Slovak musician
- Péter Nagy (tennis) (born 1992), Hungarian tennis player
- Péter Nagy (volleyball) (born 1984), Hungarian volleyball player
- Péter Nagy (weightlifter) (born 1986), Hungarian weightlifter
