= 2005 Men's European Volleyball Championship qualification =

The 2005 Men's European Volleyball Championship Qualification was the qualifying event for the 24th edition of the event, hosted in Belgrade and Rome from September 2 to September 11, 2005 and organised by Europe's governing volleyball body, the European Volleyball Confederation. The qualifying matches were all played in 2004. The four group winners and two highest scorers qualified.

== Group A ==
Pos	Team	Pld	W	L	Pts	SW	SL	SR	SPW	SPL	SPR
1	Portugal	6	5	1	11	15	8	1.875	543	485	1.120
2	Germany	6	4	2	10	15	8	1.875	549	496	1.107
3	Hungary	6	3	3	9	13	13	1.000	555	573	0.969
4	Israel	6	0	6	6	4	18	0.222	437	530	0.825

Date	Time		Score		Set 1	Set 2	Set 3	Set 4	Set 5	Total	Report
		[[ men's national volleyball team|]]	–	[[ men's national volleyball team|]]	–	–	–	–	–	0–0	
		[[ men's national volleyball team|]]	–	[[ men's national volleyball team|]]	–	–	–	–	–	0–0	
		[[ men's national volleyball team|]]	–	[[ men's national volleyball team|]]	–	–	–	–	–	0–0	
		[[ men's national volleyball team|]]	–	[[ men's national volleyball team|]]	–	–	–	–	–	0–0	
		[[ men's national volleyball team|]]	–	[[ men's national volleyball team|]]	–	–	–	–	–	0–0	
		[[ men's national volleyball team|]]	–	[[ men's national volleyball team|]]	–	–	–	–	–	0–0	
		[[ men's national volleyball team|]]	–	[[ men's national volleyball team|]]	–	–	–	–	–	0–0	
		[[ men's national volleyball team|]]	–	[[ men's national volleyball team|]]	–	–	–	–	–	0–0	
		[[ men's national volleyball team|]]	–	[[ men's national volleyball team|]]	–	–	–	–	–	0–0	
		[[ men's national volleyball team|]]	–	[[ men's national volleyball team|]]	–	–	–	–	–	0–0	
		[[ men's national volleyball team|]]	–	[[ men's national volleyball team|]]	–	–	–	–	–	0–0	
		[[ men's national volleyball team|]]	–	[[ men's national volleyball team|]]	–	–	–	–	–	0–0	

== Group B ==
Pos	Team	Pld	W	L	Pts	SW	SL	SR	SPW	SPL	SPR
1	Croatia	6	5	1	11	17	10	1.700	600	559	1.073
2	Spain	6	5	1	11	17	12	1.417	647	598	1.082
3	Belarus	6	2	4	8	13	13	1.000	561	569	0.986
4	Slovakia	6	0	6	6	6	18	0.333	477	559	0.853

Date	Time		Score		Set 1	Set 2	Set 3	Set 4	Set 5	Total	Report
		[[ men's national volleyball team|]]	–	[[ men's national volleyball team|]]	–	–	–	–	–	0–0	
		[[ men's national volleyball team|]]	–	[[ men's national volleyball team|]]	–	–	–	–	–	0–0	
		[[ men's national volleyball team|]]	–	[[ men's national volleyball team|]]	–	–	–	–	–	0–0	
		[[ men's national volleyball team|]]	–	[[ men's national volleyball team|]]	–	–	–	–	–	0–0	
		[[ men's national volleyball team|]]	–	[[ men's national volleyball team|]]	–	–	–	–	–	0–0	
		[[ men's national volleyball team|]]	–	[[ men's national volleyball team|]]	–	–	–	–	–	0–0	
		[[ men's national volleyball team|]]	–	[[ men's national volleyball team|]]	–	–	–	–	–	0–0	
		[[ men's national volleyball team|]]	–	[[ men's national volleyball team|]]	–	–	–	–	–	0–0	
		[[ men's national volleyball team|]]	–	[[ men's national volleyball team|]]	–	–	–	–	–	0–0	
		[[ men's national volleyball team|]]	–	[[ men's national volleyball team|]]	–	–	–	–	–	0–0	
		[[ men's national volleyball team|]]	–	[[ men's national volleyball team|]]	–	–	–	–	–	0–0	
		[[ men's national volleyball team|]]	–	[[ men's national volleyball team|]]	–	–	–	–	–	0–0	

== Group C ==
Pos	Team	Pld	W	L	Pts	SW	SL	SR	SPW	SPL	SPR
1	Greece	6	5	1	11	16	7	2.286	529	492	1.075
2	Bulgaria	6	4	2	10	14	9	1.556	534	486	1.099
3	Finland	6	3	3	9	12	13	0.923	543	549	0.989
4	Belgium	6	0	6	6	5	18	0.278	472	551	0.857

Date	Time		Score		Set 1	Set 2	Set 3	Set 4	Set 5	Total	Report
		[[ men's national volleyball team|]]	–	[[ men's national volleyball team|]]	–	–	–	–	–	0–0	
		[[ men's national volleyball team|]]	–	[[ men's national volleyball team|]]	–	–	–	–	–	0–0	
		[[ men's national volleyball team|]]	–	[[ men's national volleyball team|]]	–	–	–	–	–	0–0	
		[[ men's national volleyball team|]]	–	[[ men's national volleyball team|]]	–	–	–	–	–	0–0	
		[[ men's national volleyball team|]]	–	[[ men's national volleyball team|]]	–	–	–	–	–	0–0	
		[[ men's national volleyball team|]]	–	[[ men's national volleyball team|]]	–	–	–	–	–	0–0	
		[[ men's national volleyball team|]]	–	[[ men's national volleyball team|]]	–	–	–	–	–	0–0	
		[[ men's national volleyball team|]]	–	[[ men's national volleyball team|]]	–	–	–	–	–	0–0	
		[[ men's national volleyball team|]]	–	[[ men's national volleyball team|]]	–	–	–	–	–	0–0	
		[[ men's national volleyball team|]]	–	[[ men's national volleyball team|]]	–	–	–	–	–	0–0	
		[[ men's national volleyball team|]]	–	[[ men's national volleyball team|]]	–	–	–	–	–	0–0	
		[[ men's national volleyball team|]]	–	[[ men's national volleyball team|]]	–	–	–	–	–	0–0	

== Group D ==
Pos	Team	Pld	W	L	Pts	SW	SL	SR	SPW	SPL	SPR
1	Czech Republic	6	5	1	11	15	4	3.750	470	396	1.187
2	Ukraine	6	5	1	11	15	6	2.500	514	479	1.073
3	Estonia	6	1	5	7	6	16	0.375	466	516	0.903
4	Slovenia	6	1	5	7	5	15	0.333	437	496	0.881

Date	Time		Score		Set 1	Set 2	Set 3	Set 4	Set 5	Total	Report
		[[ men's national volleyball team|]]	–	[[ men's national volleyball team|]]	–	–	–	–	–	0–0	
		[[ men's national volleyball team|]]	–	[[ men's national volleyball team|]]	–	–	–	–	–	0–0	
		[[ men's national volleyball team|]]	–	[[ men's national volleyball team|]]	–	–	–	–	–	0–0	
		[[ men's national volleyball team|]]	–	[[ men's national volleyball team|]]	–	–	–	–	–	0–0	
		[[ men's national volleyball team|]]	–	[[ men's national volleyball team|]]	–	–	–	–	–	0–0	
		[[ men's national volleyball team|]]	–	[[ men's national volleyball team|]]	–	–	–	–	–	0–0	
		[[ men's national volleyball team|]]	–	[[ men's national volleyball team|]]	–	–	–	–	–	0–0	
		[[ men's national volleyball team|]]	–	[[ men's national volleyball team|]]	–	–	–	–	–	0–0	
		[[ men's national volleyball team|]]	–	[[ men's national volleyball team|]]	–	–	–	–	–	0–0	
		[[ men's national volleyball team|]]	–	[[ men's national volleyball team|]]	–	–	–	–	–	0–0	
		[[ men's national volleyball team|]]	–	[[ men's national volleyball team|]]	–	–	–	–	–	0–0	
		[[ men's national volleyball team|]]	–	[[ men's national volleyball team|]]	–	–	–	–	–	0–0	
