= 2014–15 Nemzeti Bajnokság I (men's volleyball) =

NB I 2014–15
- League: Nemzeti Bajnokság I
- Sport: volleyball
- Duration: 27 September 2014 – 29 March 2015 (regular season); 5 April 2015 – 7 May 2015 (playoffs)
- Teams: 12

Summary

NB I seasons
- ← 2013–14 2015–16 →

The 2014–15 Nemzeti Bajnokság I is the 70th season of the Nemzeti Bajnokság I, Hungary's premier Volleyball league.

== Team information ==
Location of teams in 2014-15 Nemzeti Bajnokság I

The following 12 clubs compete in the NB I during the 2014–15 season:

| Team | Location | Arena | Position 2013-14 |
|---|---|---|---|
| Dág | Dág | Oszuska Miklós Sportcsarnok | 5th |
| Dunaferr | Dunaújváros | Dunaferr Sportcsarnok | 4th |
| DEAC | Debrecen | DE AGTC Kecskeméti János Sportcsarnok | 10th |
| Kaposvár | Kaposvár | Városi Sportcsarnok | 2nd |
| Kecskemét | Kecskemét | Messzi István Sportcsarnok | 1st |
| MAFC-BME | Budapest | BME EL csarnok | 3rd |
| PEAC | Pécs | PTE-ÁOK Mozgástani Intézet | 9th |
| Pénzügyőr | Budapest | Gyulai István Általános Iskola | 1st (NB II) |
| Sümeg | Sümeg | Tatár Mihály Sportcsarnok | 8th |
| SZESE | Győr | SZESE Edzőcsarnok | 11th |
| Szolnok | Szolnok | Tiszaligeti Sportcsarnok | 7th |
| Vegyész RC | Kazincbarcika | Városi Tornacsarnok | 6th |

== Regular season ==
=== Standings ===
| # | Team | P | W | Wx3-2 | Lx3-2 | L | Sets | Pts | Qualification or relegation |
|---|---|---|---|---|---|---|---|---|---|
| 1 | FINO Kaposvár | 22 | 20 | 2 | 0 | 0 | 66:6 | 64 | Championship Playoff |
| 2 | Gorter Kecskemét RC | 22 | 18 | 2 | 1 | 1 | 63:12 | 59 | Championship Playoff |
| 3 | Vegyész RC-Kazincbarcika | 22 | 16 | 2 | 0 | 4 | 54:21 | 52 | Championship Playoff |
| 4 | Dági KSE | 22 | 15 | 1 | 2 | 4 | 53:22 | 49 | Championship Playoff |
| 5 | MAFC-BME | 22 | 9 | 3 | 2 | 8 | 42:38 | 35 | Championship Playoff |
| 6 | Sümegi RE | 22 | 8 | 2 | 3 | 9 | 37:44 | 31 | Championship Playoff |
| 7 | Pénzügyőr SE | 22 | 6 | 2 | 4 | 10 | 34:51 | 26 | Championship Playoff |
| 8 | Dunaferr SE | 22 | 6 | 2 | 1 | 13 | 30:50 | 23 | Championship Playoff |
| 9 | Szolnoki Főiskola RKSI | 22 | 4 | 3 | 2 | 13 | 32:52 | 20 | Relegation Round |
| 10 | VANNET PTE-PEAC | 22 | 4 | 1 | 3 | 12 | 27:53 | 17 | Relegation Round |
| 11 | SZESE-Győr | 22 | 3 | 0 | 1 | 18 | 13:59 | 10 | Relegation Round |
| 12 | DEAC | 22 | 1 | 2 | 3 | 16 | 19:61 | 10 | Relegation Round |

== Championship playoff ==
Teams in bold won the playoff series. Numbers to the left of each team indicate the team's original playoff seeding. Numbers to the right indicate the score of each playoff game.

Quarterfinals
1 | **FINO Kaposvár** | **3** | **3** | **3**
8 | Dunaferr SE | 0 | 0 | 0
4 | **Dági KSE** | **3** | 2 | **3** | **3**
5 | MAFC-BME | 2 | **3** | 2 | 0
2 | **Gorter Kecskemét RC** | **3** | **3** | **3**
7 | Pénzügyőr SE | 0 | 0 | 1
3 | **Vegyész RC-Kazincbarcika** | **3** | **3** | **3**
6 | Sümegi RE | 0 | 0 | 0

Semifinals
1 | **FINO Kaposvár** | **3** | **3** | **3**
4 | Dági KSE | 0 | 0 | 0
2 | **Gorter Kecskemét RC** | **3** | **3** | **3**
3 | Vegyész RC-Kazincbarcika | 1 | 1 | 0

Final
1 | **FINO Kaposvár** | 2 | 1 | **3** | **3** | **3**
2 | Kecskeméti RC | **3** | **3** | 2 | 1 | 1
Third place
3 | **Vegyész RC-Kazincbarcika** | **3** | 1 | 2 | **3** | **3**
4 | Dági KSE | 0 | **3** | **3** | 0 | 0

== Final standing ==
| Qualified for the 2015–16 CEV Challenge Cup |

| Rank | Team |
|---|---|
| 1st place, gold medalist(s) | FINO Kaposvár SE |
| 2nd place, silver medalist(s) | Kecskeméti RC |
| 3rd place, bronze medalist(s) | Vegyész RC-Kazincbarcika |
| 4 | Dági KSE |
| 5 | MAFC-BME |
| 6 | Pénzügyőr SE |
| 7 | Dunaferr SE |
| 8 | Sümegi RE |
| 9 | Szolnoki Főiskola RKSI |
| 10 | PTE-PEAC-Andragora |
| 11 | DEAC |
| 12 | SZESE-Győr |

2014–15 NB I Champions
**FINO Kaposvár SE**
**16th title**

Balázs Bagics, Bence Bozóki, Gábor Bögöly, Gábor Bögöly, Márk Deák
Péter Juhász, Keen Cameron, Bálint Magyar, Ferenc Németh, Máté Pavlényi
Alex Rása, Alpár Szabó, István Tóth, Tamás Vajda
**Head coach**
György Demeter
