= 1997 Men's European Volleyball Championship qualification =

The 1997 Men's European Volleyball Championship Qualification was the qualifying event for the 20th edition of the event, hosted in Eindhoven and Den Bosch, The Netherlands from 6 September to 14 September 1997, and organised by Europe's governing volleyball body, the European Volleyball Confederation. The qualifying matches were played in 1996 and 1997. The Netherlands qualified as hosts while Italy, Yugoslavia, Bulgaria and Russia automatically qualified from the 1995 edition of the Men's European Volleyball Championship. The five group winners and two teams from promotion round qualified for the 1997 edition.

== Qualification summary ==
Qualified teams

- Hosts
  - Netherlands
- Directly qualified after 1995 edition
  - Italy
  - Yugoslavia
  - Bulgaria
  - Russia
- Qualified through qualification
  - Group A: Slovakia
  - Group B: Greece
  - Group C: France
  - Group D: Ukraine
  - Group E: Czech Republic
- Qualified through promotion round
  - Finland
  - Germany

== Groups round ==
All games were played in home/away basis.

=== Group A ===
Pos	Team	Pld	W	L	Pts	SW	SL	SR	SPW	SPL	SPR	Qualification
1	Slovakia	6	5	1	13	16	9	1.778	342	299	1.144	1997 European Championship
2	Poland	6	3	3	11	14	11	1.273	315	297	1.061	Promotion round
3	Israel	6	3	3	10	11	12	0.917	273	295	0.925	
4	Latvia	6	1	5	2	8	17	0.471	299	338	0.885	

Date	Time		Score		Set 1	Set 2	Set 3	Set 4	Set 5	Total	Report
14 Sep		Slovakia	3–2	Poland	13–15	15–7	10–15	15–2	17–15	70–54	
21 Sep		Slovakia	3–1	Latvia	15–13	15–11	12–15	15–9		57–48	
28 Dec		Israel	3–1	Poland	15–6	9–15	16–14	15–8		55–43	
12 Apr		Israel	3–1	Latvia	15–9	5–15	15–13	15–4		50–41	
19 Apr		Latvia	3–2	Israel	15–4	15–13	13–15	16–17	15–13	74–62	
23 Apr		Poland	3–0	Israel	15–8	15–8	15–9			45–25	
26 Apr		Latvia	1–3	Slovakia	15–17	15–11	9–15	14–16		53–59	
3 May		Poland	3–1	Latvia	13–15	15–8	15–8	15–8		58–39	
10 May		Poland	2–3	Slovakia	12–15	15–5	16–14	12–15	8–15	63–64	
17 May		Israel	3–1	Slovakia	12–15	15–11	15–11	15–10		57–47	
24 May		Slovakia	3–0	Israel	15–6	15–10	15–8			45–24	
31 May		Latvia	1–3	Poland	6–15	15–7	13–15	10–15		44–52	

=== Group B ===
Pos	Team	Pld	W	L	Pts	SW	SL	SR	SPW	SPL	SPR	Qualification
1	Greece	6	5	1	15	15	4	3.750	254	187	1.358	1997 European Championship
2	Belgium	6	4	2	12	12	7	1.714	259	172	1.506	Promotion round
3	Romania	6	3	3	9	9	10	0.900	216	236	0.915	
4	Macedonia	6	0	6	0	3	18	0.167	175	309	0.566	

Date	Time		Score		Set 1	Set 2	Set 3	Set 4	Set 5	Total	Report
7 Jul		Romania	0–3	Greece	10–15	8–15	10–15			28–45	
26 Oct		Macedonia	0–3	Romania	7–15	12–15	9–15			28–45	
2 Nov		Romania	3–1	Macedonia	9–15	15–5	15–12	15–13		54–45	
23 Nov		Romania	3–1	Belgium	15–9	15–7	15–12			45–28	
15 Dec		Belgium	3–0	Macedonia	15–4	15–9	15–4			45–17	
30 Dec		Belgium	3–0	Greece	15–6	15–4	15–4			45–14	
30 Apr		Macedonia	1–3	Greece	17–15	4–15	10–15	4–15		35–60	
10 May		Greece	3–0	Macedonia	15–6	15–10	15–7			45–23	
14 May		Greece	3–0	Belgium	15–12	15–11	15–13			45–36	
17 May		Macedonia	1–3	Belgium	2–15	17–15	1–15	7–15		27–60	
20 May		Greece	3–0	Romania	15–8	15–3	15–9			45–20	
24 May		Belgium	3–0	Romania	15–6	15–8	15–10			45–24	

=== Group C ===
Pos	Team	Pld	W	L	Pts	SW	SL	SR	SPW	SPL	SPR	Qualification
1	France	8	7	1	20	22	6	3.667	390	286	1.364	1997 European Championship
2	Germany	8	5	3	16	18	11	1.636	389	319	1.219	Promotion round
3	Turkey	8	5	3	16	18	12	1.500	360	335	1.075	
4	Sweden	8	2	6	5	9	21	0.429	344	398	0.864	
5	Belarus	8	1	7	3	4	21	0.190	211	356	0.593	

Date	Time		Score		Set 1	Set 2	Set 3	Set 4	Set 5	Total	Report
8 Sep		France	3–0	Belarus	15–11	15–9	15–2			45–22	
15 Sep		France	3–0	Sweden	15–7	15–13	15–5			45–25	
22 Sep		Sweden	3–1	Belarus	15–11	12–15	15–9	15–7		57–42	
26 Oct		Turkey	3–1	France	12–15	15–10	15–6	15–13		57–44	
3 Nov		Belarus	0–3	France	6–15	2–15	7–15			15–45	
20 Nov		France	3–0	Turkey	15–5	15–3	15–8			45–16	
14 Dec		Germany	3–0	Belarus	15–3	15–6	15–8			45–17	
21 Dec		Belarus	0–3	Turkey	10–15	6–15	12–15			28–45	
21 Dec		Germany	3–0	Sweden	15–6	15–11	15–9			45–26	
4 Jan		Sweden	1–3	Germany	15–12	16–17	6–15	13–15		50–59	
19 Mar		Turkey	3–0	Belarus	15–9	15–4	15–4			45–17	
18 Apr		Turkey	3–1	Germany	15–8	15–6	10–15	15–10		55–39	
26 Apr		Belarus	0–3	Germany	10–15	4–15	11–15			25–45	
30 Apr		France	3–2	Germany	10–15	15–12	15–7	7–15	21–19	68–68	
7 May		Sweden	3–2	Turkey	15–10	15–6	13–15	12–15	15–12	70–58	
8 May		Germany	0–3	France	12–15	13–15	11–15			36–45	
11 May		Germany	3–1	Turkey	7–15	15–4	15–12	15–2		52–33	
13 May		Sweden	1–3	France	14–16	7–15	15–7	11–15		47–53	
18 May		Turkey	3–1	Sweden	15–11	6–15	15–6	15–8		51–40	
25 May		Belarus	3–0	Sweden	15–13	15–13	15–3			45–29	

=== Group D ===
Pos	Team	Pld	W	L	Pts	SW	SL	SR	SPW	SPL	SPR	Qualification
1	Ukraine	8	8	0	24	24	2	12.000	381	217	1.756	1997 European Championship
2	Portugal	8	5	3	13	16	15	1.067	378	363	1.041	Promotion round
3	Hungary	8	4	4	11	15	17	0.882	393	424	0.927	
4	Croatia	8	3	5	8	11	17	0.647	305	370	0.824	
5	Denmark	8	0	8	4	9	24	0.375	380	463	0.821	

Date	Time		Score		Set 1	Set 2	Set 3	Set 4	Set 5	Total	Report
8 Jun		Croatia	1–3	Hungary	9–15	17–16	15–17	12–15		53–63	
15 Jun		Hungary	3–0	Croatia	15–9	15–8	15–13			45–30	
18 Sep		Denmark	2–3	Hungary	15–9	11–15	15–17	15–13	13–15	69–69	
14 Dec		Hungary	3–2	Denmark	15–12	15–5	12–15	10–15	15–11	67–58	
21 Dec		Denmark	2–3	Portugal	13–15	5–15	15–11	15–13	12–15	60–69	
14 Apr		Denmark	2–3	Croatia	5–15	15–9	10–15	15–11	9–15	54–65	
18 Apr		Croatia	3–0	Denmark	15–11	15–8	15–13			45–32	
19 Apr		Portugal	3–1	Hungary	15–3	13–15	15–8	15–1		58–27	
23 Apr		Hungary	0–3	Ukraine	3–15	13–15	8–15			24–45	
26 Apr		Hungary	2–3	Portugal	15–7	11–15	15–13	13–15	12–15	66–65	
30 Apr		Ukraine	3–0	Hungary	16–14	15–10	15–8			46–32	
3 May		Portugal	3–0	Denmark	15–11	15–12	16–14			46–37	
7 May		Denmark	1–3	Ukraine	13–15	11–15	15–12	9–15		48–57	
10 May		Portugal	3–1	Croatia	15–4	13–15	15–4	15–7		58–30	
11 May		Ukraine	3–0	Denmark	15–5	15–12	15–5			45–22	
15 May		Portugal	1–3	Ukraine	15–8	7–15	7–15	10–15		39–53	
18 May		Croatia	0–3	Ukraine	11–15	11–15	5–15			27–45	
24 May		Croatia	3–0	Portugal	15–7	15–12	15–9			45–28	
28 May		Ukraine	3–0	Portugal	15–4	15–3	15–8			45–15	
31 May		Ukraine	3–0	Croatia	15–3	15–6	15–1			45–10	

=== Group E ===
Pos	Team	Pld	W	L	Pts	SW	SL	SR	SPW	SPL	SPR	Qualification
1	Czech Republic	8	7	1	21	22	7	3.143	389	289	1.346	1997 European Championship
2	Finland	8	5	3	16	18	11	1.636	378	321	1.178	Promotion round
3	Spain	8	5	3	15	18	12	1.500	409	358	1.142	
4	Slovenia	8	3	5	9	11	19	0.579	328	405	0.810	
5	Bosnia and Herzegovina	8	0	8	0	9	24	0.375	265	396	0.669	

Date	Time		Score		Set 1	Set 2	Set 3	Set 4	Set 5	Total	Report
16 Nov		Spain	3–0	Finland	15–13	16–14	15–10			46–37	
20 Nov		Spain	3–0	Bosnia and Herzegovina	15–6	15–6	15–5			45–17	
23 Nov		Finland	3–1	Spain	11–15	15–8	15–9	17–15		58–47	
28 Dec		Bosnia and Herzegovina	1–3	Czech Republic	7–15	13–15	15–7	5–15		40–52	
27 Apr		Czech Republic	3–0	Spain	15–10	16–14	15–12			46–36	
30 Apr		Czech Republic	3–0	Bosnia and Herzegovina	15–6	16–14	15–6			46–26	
30 Apr		Finland	3–0	Slovenia	15–4	15–7	15–10			45–21	
3 May		Slovenia	3–0	Bosnia and Herzegovina	15–11	15–8	15–6			45–25	
4 May		Finland	3–1	Czech Republic	15–10	15–6	0–15	15–3		45–34	
8 May		Bosnia and Herzegovina	1–3	Spain	16–14	6–15	6–15	7–15		35–59	
10 May		Slovenia	3–2	Finland	12–15	7–15	15–9	16–14	15–12	65–65	
11 May		Spain	2–3	Czech Republic	12–15	15–11	15–13	7–15	13–15	62–69	
13 May		Bosnia and Herzegovina	0–3	Finland	14–16	5–15	7–15			26–46	
14 May		Slovenia	2–3	Spain	12–15	15–11	15–13	7–15	13–15	62–69	
21 May		Spain	3–0	Slovenia	15–13	15–10	15–11			45–34	
24 May		Finland	3–0	Bosnia and Herzegovina	15–8	15–13	15–9			45–30	
24 May		Slovenia	0–3	Czech Republic	4–15	11–15	2–15			17–45	
27 May		Czech Republic	3–0	Slovenia	15–11	15–8	15–7			45–26	
31 May		Czech Republic	3–1	Finland	7–15	15–6	15–6	15–10		52–37	
31 May		Bosnia and Herzegovina	2–3	Slovenia	15–7	15–5	13–15	9–15	14–16	66–58	

== Promotion round ==
- Venue: Vienna, Austria
- Austria added as a host to qualified teams.

All times are local

=== Group F ===
Pos	Team	Pld	W	L	Pts	SW	SL	SR	SPW	SPL	SPR	Qualification
1	Belgium	5	4	1	12	12	6	2.000	245	151	1.623	Semifinals
2	Germany	5	4	1	10	13	8	1.625	264	232	1.138	Semifinals
3	Poland	5	3	2	10	12	7	1.714	232	223	1.040	Semifinals
4	Finland	5	2	3	7	10	11	0.909	271	258	1.050	Semifinals
5	Austria	5	2	3	4	7	13	0.538	200	269	0.743	
6	Portugal	5	0	5	2	6	15	0.400	220	299	0.736	

Date	Time		Score		Set 1	Set 2	Set 3	Set 4	Set 5	Total	Report
2 Jul	15:00	Belgium	3–1	Germany	11–15	15–4	15–6	15–9		56–34	
2 Jul	17:30	Finland	3–2	Portugal	12–15	15–8	11–15	15–9	15–11	68–58	
2 Jul	20:00	Poland	3–1	Austria	7–15	15–13	15–8	15–7		52–43	
3 Jul	15:00	Finland	3–0	Belgium	15–11	15–9	15–12			45–32	
3 Jul	17:30	Poland	3–0	Portugal	16–14	15–8	15–9			46–31	
3 Jul	20:00	Germany	3–0	Austria	15–3	15–8	15–3			45–14	
5 Jul	15:00	Belgium	3–1	Poland	15–4	11–15	15–1	15–10		56–30	
5 Jul	17:30	Germany	3–2	Finland	17–15	8–15	15–6	6–15	15–12	61–63	
5 Jul	20:00	Austria	3–2	Portugal	12–15	12–15	15–11	15–7	15–13	69–61	
6 Jul	15:00	Germany	3–2	Poland	11–15	15–13	8–15	15–4	15–12	64–59	
6 Jul	17:30	Austria	3–2	Finland	15–10	10–15	7–15	15–13	15–13	62–66	
6 Jul	20:00	Belgium	3–1	Portugal	11–15	15–5	15–5	15–5		56–30	
7 Jul	15:00	Poland	3–0	Finland	15–11	15–8	15–10			45–29	
7 Jul	17:30	Germany	3–1	Portugal	15–17	15–10	15–7	15–6		60–40	
7 Jul	20:00	Belgium	3–0	Austria	15–2	15–2	15–8			45–12	

=== Semifinals ===
Date	Time		Score		Set 1	Set 2	Set 3	Set 4	Set 5	Total	Report
9 Jul	17:30	Finland	3–2	Belgium	7–15	15–12	7–15	15–5	22–20	66–67	
9 Jul	20:00	Germany	3–1	Poland	15–7	15–11	6–15	15–13		51–46	

=== Third place game ===
Date	Time		Score		Set 1	Set 2	Set 3	Set 4	Set 5	Total	Report
10 Jul	17:30	Poland	3–0	Belgium	15–9	15–5	15–9			45–23	

=== Final ===
Date	Time		Score		Set 1	Set 2	Set 3	Set 4	Set 5	Total	Report
10 Jul	20:00	Finland	3–0	Germany	15–9	15–13	15–10			45–32	

== Final standing ==
Qualified to 1997 European Championship

Rank	Team
1	Finland
2	Germany
3	Poland
4	Belgium
5	Austria
6	Portugal
