= 2016–17 Nemzeti Bajnokság I (men's volleyball) =

2016–17 Férfi Röplabda NB I
- League: Nemzeti Bajnokság I
- Sport: Volleyball (men's)
- Duration: September 24, 2016 – 13 May 2017
- Teams: 11
- TV partner: M4 Sport

Finals
- Champions: Fino Kaposvár (18th title)
- Runners-up: Pénzügyőr

Nemzeti Bajnokság I seasons
- 2015–16 2017–18

2016–17 NB I is the 72nd season of the Hungarian Championship (Nemzeti Bajnokság I) organized under the supervision of Magyar Röplabda Szövetség (MRSZ).

== Team information ==
Location of teams in 2016-17 Nemzeti Bajnokság I

The following 10 + 1 clubs compete in the NB I during the 2016–17 season:

Team	Location	Arena	Position 2015–16
Dunaferr SE	Dunaújváros	Dunaferr Sportcsarnok	5
DEAC	Debrecen	DE AGTC Kecskeméti János Sportcsarnok	11
Kaposvár Volley	Kaposvár	Városi Sportcsarnok	Champion
Kecskeméti RC	Kecskemét	Messzi István Sportcsarnok	Third place
MAFC-BME	Budapest	BME EL csarnok	6
PTE-PEAC	Pécs	PTE-ÁOK Mozgástani Intézet	10
Pénzügyőr SE	Budapest	Gyulai István Általános Iskola	7
Sümegi RE	Sümeg	Tatár Mihály Sportcsarnok	8
Szolnok FRKSI	Szolnok	Tiszaligeti Sportcsarnok	9
Vegyész RC	Kazincbarcika	Don Bosco Sportközpont	Runner-up

== Regular season ==
Pos	Team	Pld	W	L	Pts	SW	SL	SR	SPW	SPL	SPR	Qualification
1	Fino Kaposvár SE	20	19	1	56	59	10	5.900	0	0	—	Play–off
2	Vegyész RCK	20	16	4	47	51	19	2.684	0	0	—	Play–off
3	Pénzügyőr SE	20	16	4	47	53	20	2.650	0	0	—	Play–off
4	Openhouse Szolnoki RKSI	20	13	7	41	47	26	1.808	0	0	—	Play–off
5	Dunaferr SE	20	12	8	33	41	34	1.206	0	0	—	Play–off
6	HÉP-Kecskeméti RC	20	11	9	37	44	32	1.375	0	0	—	Play–off
7	MAFC-BME	20	10	10	31	37	34	1.088	0	0	—	Relegation round
8	Sümegi RE	20	5	15	15	18	47	0.383	0	0	—	Relegation round
9	Debreceni EAC	20	4	16	12	14	48	0.292	0	0	—	Relegation round
10	PTE-PEAC C-Doki	20	3	17	8	10	54	0.185	0	0	—	Relegation round
11	Hungary national junior team	20	1	19	3	9	59	0.153	0	0	—	

Updated to match(es) played on 15 February 2017. Source:

=== Results ===
Home \ Away	DEA	DFS	JUN	KAP	KRC	MAF	PEA	PSE	SRE	SZO	VRC
Debreceni EAC		0–3	3–0	0–3	0–3	0–3	1–3	0–3	3–0	0–3	0–3
Dunaferr SE	3–0		3–1	3–2	3–2	3–2	3–0	1–3	3–0	3–1	0–3
National junior team	0–3	3–2		0–3	1–3	1–3	0–3	0–3	0–3	0–3	0–3
Fino Kaposvár SE	3–0	3–0	3–0		3–0	3–0	3–0	3–2	3–0	3–0	3–0
HÉP-Kecskeméti RC	3–0	3–1	3–0	1–3		3–1	3–0	3–0	3–1	1–3	0–3
MAFC-BME	3–0	3–0	3–1	0–3	3–2		3–0	0–3	3–0	1–3	1–3
PTE-PEAC C-Doki	0–3	0–3	3–2	0–3	0–3	0–3		0–3	1–3	0–3	0–3
Pénzügyőr SE	3–0	3–0	3–0	2–3	3–2	3–2	3–0		3–0	3–0	3–1
Sümegi RE	3–1	0–3	3–0	1–3	1–3	0–3	3–0	0–3		0–3	0–3
Openhouse Szolnoki RKSI	3–0	2–3	3–0	1–3	3–2	3–0	3–0	3–1	3–0		2–3
Vegyész RCK	3–0	3–1	3–0	0–3	3–1	3–0	3–0	2–3	3–0	3–2	

Legend: Blue = home team win; Red = away team win.

== Play–off ==
The six teams that finished in the places 1 to 6 in the Regular season, compete in the Play-off (1-6).

Quarter-finals
4	Openhouse Szolnoki RKSI	2
5	Dunaferr SE	0
3	Pénzügyőr SE	2
6	HÉP-Kecskeméti RC	1

Semi-finals
1	Fino Kaposvár SE	3
4	Openhouse Szolnoki RKSI	0
2	Vegyész RCK	2
3	Pénzügyőr SE	3

Finals
1	Fino Kaposvár SE	3
3	Pénzügyőr SE	2

=== Final ===
In the Playoff's final the two qualified teams play against each other in a series where the team winning three games will become the 2016–17 NB I championship. The team that finished in the higher Regular season place will be played the first, the third and the fifth (if it is necessary) game of the series at home.

Fino Kaposvár SE – Pénzügyőr SE (3–2):

Date	Time		Score		Set 1	Set 2	Set 3	Set 4	Set 5	Total	Report
19 Mar	15:15	Fino Kaposvár SE	1–3	Pénzügyőr SE	25–27	26–24	22–25	19–25	—	92–101	Report
22 Mar	20:00	Pénzügyőr SE	3–0	Fino Kaposvár SE	25–16	25–23	25–15	—	—	75–54	Report
26 Mar	15:15	Fino Kaposvár SE	3–1	Pénzügyőr SE	25–17	23–25	25–22	25–20	—	98–84	Report
29 Mar	20:00	Pénzügyőr SE	1–3	Fino Kaposvár SE	25–23	20–25	21–25	18–25	—	84–98	Report
4 Apr	17:30	Fino Kaposvár SE	3–2	Pénzügyőr SE	25–23	25–21	21–25	24–26	15–11	110–106	

== Season statistics ==
=== Number of teams by counties ===
Pos.	County (megye)	No. of teams	Teams
1	Budapest (capital)	2	MAFC-BME and Pénzügyőr SE
2	Baranya	1	PTE-PEAC
2	Bács-Kiskun	1	Kecskeméti RC
2	Borsod-Abaúj-Zemplén	1	Vegyész RCK
2	Fejér	1	Dunaferr SE
2	Hajdú-Bihar	1	Debreceni EAC
2	Jász-Nagykun-Szolnok	1	Szolnoki RKSI
2	Somogy	1	Kaposvár Volley
2	Veszprém	1	Sümegi RE

== Final standings ==
Qualified for the 2017–18 CEV Cup
Qualified for the 2017–18 CEV Challenge Cup
Relegated to the 2017–18 NB II

Rank	Team
1st place, gold medalist(s)	Fino Kaposvár SE
2nd place, silver medalist(s)	Pénzügyőr SE
3rd place, bronze medalist(s)	Vegyész RC Kazincbarcika
4	Openhouse Szolnoki RKSI
5	
6	
7	
8	Sümegi RE
9	DEAC
10	PTE-PEAC C-Doki
11	Hungary national junior team
