= György Demeter =

Hungarian volleyball player and coach

György Demeter (Hungarian: Demeter György) (born February 24, 1957, in Szarvas, Hungary) is a former Hungarian volleyball player. He also coached for Hungary men's national volleyball team, Erdemirspor where he won Turkish Men's Volleyball League both by player and coach and Fenerbahçe Istanbul from Turkey.

== Honors ==
- Turkish Men's Volleyball League
  - Erdemirspor (2): 2003–04, 2004–05
  - Fenerbahçe Istanbul (2): 2007–08, 2009–10
- Turkish Cup
  - Fenerbahçe Istanbul (1): 2007–08
