= Péter Nagy (volleyball) =

Hungarian volleyball player (born 1984)

Péter Nagy (born 15 May 1984) is a Hungarian volleyball player who plays for Remat Zalău and the Hungarian national team.

Nagy previously played in Germany for VfB Friedrichshafen, in Italy for Canadiens Mantova and in Austria for Aon hotVolleys Vienna. He achieved his biggest success with Friedrichshafen by winning the CEV Champions League in 2007. With his performances in 2011 he earned the Player of Year award in the Romanian championship.
