= 2015–16 Nemzeti Bajnokság I (men's volleyball) =

- League: NB I
- Sport: Volleyball
- Duration: 2015–2016
- Teams: 12
- TV partner: M4 Sport

NB I seasons
- 2014–15 2016–17

The 2015–16 Nemzeti Bajnokság I is the 71st season of the Nemzeti Bajnokság I, Hungary's premier Volleyball league.

In season 2015/2016 Hungary will be representing by Kaposvár Volley in CEV Challenge Cup.

== Team information ==
Location of teams in 2015-16 Nemzeti Bajnokság I

The following 11 clubs compete in the NB I during the 2015–16 season:

Team	Location	Arena	Position 2014–15
Dági KSE	Dág	Oszuska Miklós Sportcsarnok	4th
Dunaferr SE	Dunaújváros	Dunaferr Sportcsarnok	7th
DEAC	Debrecen	DE AGTC Kecskeméti János Sportcsarnok	11th
Kaposvár Volley	Kaposvár	Városi Sportcsarnok	Champion
Kecskeméti RC	Kecskemét	Messzi István Sportcsarnok	Runner-up
MAFC-BME	Budapest	BME EL csarnok	5th
PTE-PEAC	Pécs	PTE-ÁOK Mozgástani Intézet	10th
Pénzügyőr SE	Budapest	Gyulai István Általános Iskola	6th
Sümegi RE	Sümeg	Tatár Mihály Sportcsarnok	8th
Szolnok FRKSI	Szolnok	Tiszaligeti Sportcsarnok	9th
Vegyész RC	Kazincbarcika	Városi Tornacsarnok	Third place

== Regular season (Alapszakasz) ==
Pos	Team	Pld	W	L	Pts	SW	SL	SR	SPW	SPL	SPR	Qualification
1	Fino Kaposvár SE	22	22	0	63	57	6	9.500	1114	781	1.426	Playoffs
2	Kecskeméti RC	14	12	2	33	38	12	3.167	1197	995	1.203	Playoffs
3	Dági KSE	5	4	1	11	12	4	3.000	0	0	—	Playoffs
4	Vegyész RCK	3	3	0	9	9	0	MAX	0	0	—	Playoffs
5	MAFC-BME	0	0	0	0	0	0	—	0	0	—	Playoffs
6	Pénzügyőr SE	0	0	0	0	0	0	—	0	0	—	Playoffs
7	Dunaferr SE	0	0	0	0	0	0	—	0	0	—	Playoffs
8	Sümegi RE	0	0	0	0	0	0	—	0	0	—	Playoffs
9	Szolnoki FRKSI	0	0	0	0	0	0	—	0	0	—	Relegation Round
10	PTE-PEAC C-Doki	0	0	0	0	0	0	—	0	0	—	Relegation Round
11	Debreceni EAC	0	0	0	0	0	0	—	0	0	—	Relegation Round

== Playoffs ==
Teams in bold won the playoff series. Numbers to the left of each team indicate the team's original playoff seeding. Numbers to the right indicate the score of each playoff game.

Quarterfinals
1	**Fino Kaposvár**	**3**	**3**
8	Sümeg	0	0
4	**Dági KSE**	**3**	2	**3**
5	MAFC-BME	0	**3**	2
2	**Kecskeméti RC**	**3**
7	Pénzügyőr SE	2
3	**Vegyész RC Kazincbarcika**	**3**	**3**
6	Dunaferr SE	0	2

Semifinals
1	Fino Kaposvár SE
4	Dági KSE
2	Kecskeméti RC
3	Vegyész RC Kazincbarcika

Final
3rd Place

=== Final ===
(to 3 victories)

Date	Time		Score		Set 1	Set 2	Set 3	Set 4	Set 5	Total	Report
21 Apr	19:00	**Fino Kaposvár SE**	**3–0**	Vegyész RC Kazincbarcika	25–15	25–19	25–21			**75–55**	
23 Apr	11:00	Vegyész RC Kazincbarcika	–	Fino Kaposvár SE	–	–	–	–	–	**0–0**	
25 Apr	20:00	Fino Kaposvár SE	–	Vegyész RC Kazincbarcika	–	–	–	–	–	**0–0**	
Apr	20:30	Asseco Resovia Rzeszów	–	ZAKSA Kędzierzyn-Koźle	–	–	–	–	–	**0–0**	
May	18:00	ZAKSA Kędzierzyn-Koźle	–	Asseco Resovia Rzeszów	–	–	–	–	–	**0–0**	

== Season statistics ==
=== Number of teams by counties ===
Pos.	County (megye)	No. of teams	Teams
1	Budapest	2	MAFC and Pénzügyőr
2	Bács-Kiskun	1	Kecskemét
2	Baranya	1	PEAC
2	Borsod-Abaúj-Zemplén	1	Vegyész RC
2	Fejér	1	Dunaferr
2	Hajdú-Bihar	1	DEAC
2	Jász-Nagykun-Szolnok	1	Szolnok
2	Komárom-Esztergom	1	Dági KSE
2	Somogy	1	Kaposvár
2	Veszprém	1	Sümeg
