= Hungarian Women's Volleyball League =

Hungarian women's volleyball competition

- Current season, competition or edition: 2021–22 Women's Hungarian Volleyball League
- Sport: Volleyball
- Founded: 1947
- First season: 1947
- Administrator: MRS
- No. of teams: 8 (2021–22)
- Country: Hungary
- Continent: Europe
- Most recent champion: Fatum-Nyíregyháza (1st title)
- Most titles: NIM SE (11 titles)
- Level on pyramid: 1
- Relegation to: 2nd League
- Domestic cups: Hungarian Cup; Hungarian Super Cup
- International cups: CEV Champions League; CEV Cup; CEV Challenge Cup
- Website: http://www.hunvolley.hu/

The Hungarian Women's Volleyball League in (Hungarian Magyar női röplabdabajnokság) is a Hungarian women's volleyball competition organized by the Hungarian Volleyball Federation (Magyar Röplabda Szövetség, MRS). It was created in 1947.

== History ==
The Hungarian Women's Volleyball League also called Extraliga is Hungary topflight league in Women's Volleyball and the first edition was played in 1946/47 and was continually Exist since, Only the 1955/56 season wasn't Disputed, Among the most Dominated clubs there is the Nim-Se Budapest who won a total of 11 titles record followed by Újpesti TE 10 titles and most recently Vasas Sport Club with 6 the first two spot teams are qualified to represent Hungary in the European clubs competitions.

== List of Champions ==
Years	(gold) Gold	(silver) Silver	(bronze) Bronze
1947	Columbia SE	Ganz TE	NTE
1948	Columbia SE	Ganz TE	Polgári Sör
1949	Ganz TE	Háztartási Bolt	Polgári Sör
1949-50	Ganz TE	Csepeli Vasas SK	BSE
1950	BSE	X. Kerültei ÉDOSZ	Csepeli Vasas SK
1951	Bp. Petőfi VTSK	Ganz Villamossági SK	Bp. Haladás
1952	Bp. Haladás	Bp. Petőfi VTSK	Háztartási Bolt
1953	Vasas Turbó	Bp. Haladás	Háztartási Bolt
1954	Pénzügyminisztérium SC	Bp. Petőfi VTSK	Bp. Haladás
1955	Pénzügyminisztérium SC	Vasas Turbó	Háztartási Bolt
1956	Competition Not Played		
1957	Pénzügyminisztérium SC	Háztartási Bolt	Bp. Petőfi VTSK
1958	Háztartási Bolt	Bp. Petőfi VTSK	BVSC
1959	Vasas Turbó	Bp. Petőfi VTSK	Háztartási Bolt
1960	Háztartási Bolt	Bp. Petőfi VTSK	Vasas Turbó
1961	Bp. Petőfi VTSK	Vasas Turbó	Bp. Vörös Meteor
1962	Vasas Turbó	Bp. Építők	Bp. Petőfi VTSK
1963	Újpesti Dózsa	Bp. Építők	Bp. Vörös Meteor
1964	Újpesti Dózsa	Vasas Turbó	Bp. Vörös Meteor
1965	Újpesti Dózsa	Bp. Vörös Meteor	Vasas Turbó
1966	Újpesti Dózsa	Testnevelési Főiskola SE	NIM SE (Nehézipari Minisztérium SE)
1967	Újpesti Dózsa	Bp. Vörös Meteor	Bp. Előre
1968	Újpesti Dózsa	NIM SE (Nehézipari Minisztérium SE)	Bp. Előre
1969	NIM SE (Nehézipari Minisztérium SE)	Újpesti Dózsa	BKV Előre
1970	Újpesti Dózsa	NIM SE (Nehézipari Minisztérium SE)	BKV Előre
1971	NIM SE (Nehézipari Minisztérium SE)	Újpesti Dózsa	BKV Előre
1972	NIM SE (Nehézipari Minisztérium SE)	Újpesti Dózsa	BKV Előre
1973	NIM SE (Nehézipari Minisztérium SE)	Újpesti Dózsa	Bp. Spartacus
1974	NIM SE (Nehézipari Minisztérium SE)	Újpesti Dózsa	Bp. Spartacus
1975	NIM SE (Nehézipari Minisztérium SE)	Újpesti Dózsa	Bp. Spartacus
1976	NIM SE (Nehézipari Minisztérium SE)	Újpesti Dózsa	Bp. Vasas Izzó SK
1977	NIM SE (Nehézipari Minisztérium SE)	Újpesti Dózsa	Bp. Vasas Izzó SK
1978	NIM SE (Nehézipari Minisztérium SE)	Bp. Vasas Izzó SK	Újpesti Dózsa
1979	NIM SE (Nehézipari Minisztérium SE)	Újpesti Dózsa	Bp. Vasas Izzó SK
1980	Bp. Vasas Izzó SK	NIM SE (Nehézipari Minisztérium SE)	Újpesti Dózsa
1981	NIM SE (Nehézipari Minisztérium SE)	Bp. Vasas Izzó SK	Újpesti Dózsa
1982	Bp. Vasas Izzó SK	Vasas SC Budapest	Újpesti Dózsa
1983	Tungsram SC	Vasas SC Budapest	Újpesti Dózsa
1984	Tungsram SC	Újpesti Dózsa	Vasas SC Budapest
1985	Tungsram SC	Újpesti Dózsa	Bp. Spartacus
1986	Újpesti Dózsa	Tungsram SC	Alba Volán SC
1987	Újpesti Dózsa	Tungsram SC	Vasas SC Budapest
1988	Tungsram SC	Újpesti Dózsa	BVSC
1989	Vasas SC Budapest	Tungsram SC	Eger SE
1990	Újpesti Dózsa	Vasas SC Budapest	Eger SE
1991	Eger SE	BVSC-Miriad	Tungsram SC
1992	Tungsram SC	Eger SE	BVSC
1993	Tungsram SC	Eger SE	Vasas TuttoMobili
1994	Kordax-Eger SC	Tungsram SC	Extrade SC
1995	Kordax-Eger SC	Tungsram SC	Vasas SC Budapest
1996	Kordax-Eger SC	Vasas-Budai Tégla SC	Budapest SE-CSM
1997	Eger-AgriaComputer RC	Vértes Volán SE-Tatabánya	Budapest SE-CSM
1998	Eger-AgriaComputer RC	Budapest SE-CSM	Vértes Volán SE-Tatabánya
1999	Vértes Volán SE-Tatabánya	Budapest SE-CSM	EGUT RC-Eger
2000	Szakszig NRK-Nyíregyháza	EGUT RC-Eger	Budapest SE-CSM
2001	Szakszig NRK-Nyíregyháza	EGUT RC-Eger	Budapest SE-CSM
2002	Szabolcsút NRK-Nyíregyháza	Budapest SE-FCSM	V-fon Jászberényi RK
2003	NRK Nyíregyháza	Budapest SE-FCSM	Vasas-Budai Tégla SC
2004	Budapest SE-FCSM	Vasas SC Opus-Via Óbuda	Minor-Phoenix-Mecano-Kecskeméti RC
2005	Vasas SC Opus-Via Óbuda	NRK Nyíregyháza	Budapest SE-FCSM
2006	Budapest SE-FCSM	Vasas SC Opus-Via Óbuda	NRK Nyíregyháza
2007	Betonút-NRK Nyíregyháza	TEVA Gödöllői RC	Budapest SE-FCSM
2008	Vasas SC Opus-Via Óbuda	Betonút-NRK Nyíregyháza	Budapest SE-FCSM
2009	Budapest SE-FCSM	Betonút-NRK-Nyíregyháza	Vasas SC Duna Autó Óbuda
2010	Budapest SE-FCSM	Vasas SC Duna Autó Óbuda	TEVA Gödöllői RC
2011	Budapest SE-FCSM	Vasas SC Duna Autó Óbuda	Újpest UTE
2012	Vasas Óbuda Hofeka	TEVA Gödöllői RC	Budapest SE-FKF
2013	Vasas SC-Óbuda	TEVA Gödöllői RC	Budapest Bank-Békéscsabai RSE
2014	Linamar-Békéscsabai RSE	Vasas SC-Óbuda	TEVA Gödöllői RC
2015	Linamar-Békéscsabai RSE	Vasas SC-Óbuda	Újpest UTE
2016	Linamar-Békéscsabai RSE	Vasas SC-Óbuda	Újpest UTE
2017	Linamar-Békéscsabai RSE	Vasas SC-Óbuda	Fatum-Nyíregyháza
2018	Linamar-Békéscsabai RSE	Fatum-Nyíregyháza	Újpest UTE
2019	Vasas SC-Óbuda	Fatum-Nyíregyháza	Linamar-Békéscsabai RSE
2020	Cancelled due to the COVID-19 pandemic		
2021	Fatum-Nyíregyháza	Swietelsky-Békéscsabai RSE	Vasas SC-Óbuda
