= Békéscsabai RSE =

Women's volleyball club in Békéscsaba, Hungary

- Full name: Békéscsabai Röplabda Sportegyesület
- Short name: BRSE
- Ground: Városi Sporcsarnok
- Manager: (Romania) Bogdan Paul
- League: NB I
- 2017–18: NB I, 1st
- Website: Club home page

Békéscsabai RSE, is a Hungarian women's volleyball club based in Békéscsaba. They won the Hungarian Championships five times in a row from 2014 to 2018.

== Honours ==
=== National competitions ===
- NB I: 5

2014, 2015, 2016, 2017, 2018

- Hungarian Cup: 2

2016, 2017

== Team ==
=== Current squad ===
- 1 (Montenegro) Ksenija Ivanović
- 2 (Hungary) Renáta Szpin
- 3 (Montenegro) Nikoleta Perović
- 4 (Hungary) Fanny Fábián
- 5 (Serbia) Sofija Medić
- 6 (Hungary) Zóra Glemboczki
- 7 (Hungary) Zsuzsanna Tálas
- 8 (Hungary) Eszter Anna Pekárik
- 9 (Croatia) Lucija Mlinar
- 10 (Hungary) Dorottya Bodnár
- 11 (Hungary) Réka Szedmák
- 12 (Hungary) Flóra Sebestyén
- 13 (Hungary) Rita Molcsányi
- 14 (Montenegro) Tatjana Bokan
- 15 (Hungary) Hanna Bodovics
