= Volleyball at the 2015 European Games – Women's team rosters =

This article shows the rosters of all participating teams at the 2015 European Games – Women's tournament in Azerbaijan.

== Pool A ==
=== Azerbaijan ===
The following is the Azerbaijani roster in the 2015 European Games.

Head coach: Aleksandr Chervyakov

No.	Name	Date of birth	Height	Weight	Spike	Block	2015 club
2	Kseniya Kovalenko	21 November 1986	1.90 m (6 ft 3 in)	78 kg (172 lb)	300 cm (120 in)	295 cm (116 in)	(Azerbaijan) Azeryol Baku
4	Oksana Kurt (C)	28 July 1984	1.84 m (6 ft 0 in)	77 kg (170 lb)	300 cm (120 in)	290 cm (110 in)	(Azerbaijan) Azeryol Baku
5	Odina Bayramova	25 May 1990	1.86 m (6 ft 1 in)	88 kg (194 lb)	315 cm (124 in)	295 cm (116 in)	(Azerbaijan) Azeryol Baku
6	Ayshan Abdulazimova	11 April 1993	1.84 m (6 ft 0 in)	68 kg (150 lb)	265 cm (104 in)	260 cm (100 in)	(Azerbaijan) Lokomotiv Baku
7	Yelena Parkhomenko	11 September 1982	1.86 m (6 ft 1 in)	68 kg (150 lb)	300 cm (120 in)	293 cm (115 in)	(Azerbaijan) Azerrail Baku
8	Natavan Gasimova	8 July 1985	1.78 m (5 ft 10 in)	61 kg (134 lb)	287 cm (113 in)	275 cm (108 in)	Unattached
10	Jana Aghayeva	7 July 1987	1.95 m (6 ft 5 in)	76 kg (168 lb)	318 cm (125 in)	302 cm (119 in)	(Turkey) Chanakkale Belediyespor
11	Katerina Zhidkova	28 September 1989	1.87 m (6 ft 2 in)	68 kg (150 lb)	298 cm (117 in)	285 cm (112 in)	(Azerbaijan) Azeryol Baku
12	Valeriya Mammadova (L)	29 January 1984	1.74 m (5 ft 9 in)	65 kg (143 lb)	286 cm (113 in)	272 cm (107 in)	(Azerbaijan) Azeryol Baku
14	Krystsina Yagubova (L)	13 February 1996	1.84 m (6 ft 0 in)	69 kg (152 lb)	295 cm (116 in)	285 cm (112 in)	(Azerbaijan) Telekom Baku
15	Aynur Karimova	7 December 1988	1.86 m (6 ft 1 in)	71 kg (157 lb)	295 cm (116 in)	285 cm (112 in)	(Azerbaijan) Azerrail Baku
16	Oksana Kiselyova	30 May 1992	1.77 m (5 ft 10 in)	70 kg (150 lb)	275 cm (108 in)	260 cm (100 in)	(Azerbaijan) Lokomotiv Baku
17	Polina Rahimova	5 June 1990	1.95 m (6 ft 5 in)	73 kg (161 lb)	307 cm (121 in)	290 cm (110 in)	(Japan) TAB Queenseis
20	Marharyta Azizova	25 April 1993	1.86 m (6 ft 1 in)	73 kg (161 lb)	308 cm (121 in)	289 cm (114 in)	(Azerbaijan) Telekom Baku

=== Belgium ===
The following is the Belgian roster in the 2015 European Games.

Head coach: Gert Vande Broek

No.	Name	Date of birth	Height	Weight	Spike	Block	2015 club
2	Jasmien Biebauw	24 September 1990	1.80 m (5 ft 11 in)	81 kg (179 lb)	295 cm (116 in)	274 cm (108 in)	(Belgium) Asterix Kieldrecht
4	Valérie Courtois	1 November 1990	1.71 m (5 ft 7 in)	66 kg (146 lb)	280 cm (110 in)	270 cm (110 in)	(Poland) Organika Budowlani Łódź
5	Laura Heyrman	17 May 1993	1.86 m (6 ft 1 in)	73 kg (161 lb)	310 cm (120 in)	280 cm (110 in)	(Italy) Liu Jo Modena
6	Charlotte Leys (C)	18 March 1989	1.84 m (6 ft 0 in)	78 kg (172 lb)	305 cm (120 in)	293 cm (115 in)	(Poland) PGE Atom Trefl Sopot
7	Jolien Wittock	22 February 1990	1.88 m (6 ft 2 in)	75 kg (165 lb)	310 cm (120 in)	295 cm (116 in)	(Belgium) VC Oudegem
8	Kaja Grobelna	4 January 1995	1.88 m (6 ft 2 in)	72 kg (159 lb)	318 cm (125 in)	289 cm (114 in)	(Belgium) Asterix Kieldrecht
9	Freya Aelbrecht	10 February 1990	1.87 m (6 ft 2 in)	81 kg (179 lb)	312 cm (123 in)	295 cm (116 in)	(Italy) Yamamay Busto Arsizio
10	Lise Van Hecke	1 July 1992	1.86 m (6 ft 1 in)	70 kg (150 lb)	299 cm (118 in)	281 cm (111 in)	(Italy) Rebecchi Nordameccanica Piacenza
11	Els Vandesteene	30 May 1987	1.84 m (6 ft 0 in)	70 kg (150 lb)	308 cm (121 in)	291 cm (115 in)	(France) Volleyball Nantes
12	Dominika Strumilo	26 December 1996	1.86 m (6 ft 1 in)	66 kg (146 lb)	311 cm (122 in)	292 cm (115 in)	(Belgium) Asterix Kieldrecht
17	Ilka Van De Vyver	26 January 1993	1.79 m (5 ft 10 in)	73 kg (161 lb)	296 cm (117 in)	273 cm (107 in)	(France) RC Cannes
18	Britt Ruysschaert	27 May 1994	1.77 m (5 ft 10 in)	62 kg (137 lb)	302 cm (119 in)	281 cm (111 in)	(Belgium) Asterix Kieldrecht
19	Sarah Cools	14 April 1997	1.88 m (6 ft 2 in)	68 kg (150 lb)	312 cm (123 in)	291 cm (115 in)	(Belgium) Asterix Kieldrecht
20	Maud Catry	4 September 1990	1.89 m (6 ft 2 in)	78 kg (172 lb)	307 cm (121 in)	302 cm (119 in)	(France) Saint-Cloud Paris

=== Italy ===
The following is the Italian roster in the 2015 European Games.

Head coach: Fabio Soli

No.	Name	Date of birth	Height	Weight	Spike	Block	2015 club
3	Elena Perinelli	27 June 1995	1.81 m (5 ft 11 in)	68 kg (150 lb)	279 cm (110 in)	264 cm (104 in)	(Italy) Scandicci
4	Sara Loda	22 August 1990	1.79 m (5 ft 10 in)	67 kg (148 lb)	290 cm (110 in)	276 cm (109 in)	(Italy) Bergamo Foppapedretti
5	Anastasia Guerra	15 October 1996	1.86 m (6 ft 1 in)	74 kg (163 lb)	300 cm (120 in)	286 cm (113 in)	(Italy) Club Italia
7	Laura Melandri	31 January 1995	1.86 m (6 ft 1 in)	60 kg (130 lb)	285 cm (112 in)	275 cm (108 in)	(Italy) Bergamo Foppapedretti
9	Letizia Camera	1 October 1992	1.75 m (5 ft 9 in)	62 kg (137 lb)	285 cm (112 in)	270 cm (110 in)	(Italy) Busto Arsizio Volley
10	Beatrice Parrocchiale	26 December 1995	1.68 m (5 ft 6 in)	59 kg (130 lb)	286 cm (113 in)	258 cm (102 in)	(Italy) San Casciano Volley
11	Miriam Fatime Sylla	8 January 1995	1.81 m (5 ft 11 in)	80 kg (180 lb)	314 cm (124 in)	287 cm (113 in)	(Italy) Bergamo Foppapedretti
12	Giulia Pascucci	29 September 1993	1.88 m (6 ft 2 in)	70 kg (150 lb)	289 cm (114 in)	275 cm (108 in)	(Italy) San Casciano Volley
13	Raffaella Calloni (C)	4 May 1983	1.84 m (6 ft 0 in)	70 kg (150 lb)	302 cm (119 in)	283 cm (111 in)	(Italy) San Casciano Volley
14	Valeria Caracuta	14 December 1987	1.73 m (5 ft 8 in)	57 kg (126 lb)	275 cm (108 in)	260 cm (100 in)	(Italy) Piacenza Nordmeccanica
17	Giulia Pisani	4 June 1992	1.84 m (6 ft 0 in)	69 kg (152 lb)	313 cm (123 in)	298 cm (117 in)	(Italy) Busto Arsizio Volley
20	Ilaria Spirito	20 February 1994	1.74 m (5 ft 9 in)	56 kg (123 lb)	250 cm (98 in)	243 cm (96 in)	(Italy) Club Italia

=== Poland ===
The following is the Polish roster in the 2015 European Games.

Head coach: Jacek Nawrocki

No.	Name	Date of birth	Height	Weight	Spike	Block	2015 club
1	Anna Werblińska	14 May 1984	1.78 m (5 ft 10 in)	69 kg (152 lb)	306 cm (120 in)	292 cm (115 in)	(Poland) Chemik Police
2	Maja Tokarska	22 February 1991	1.93 m (6 ft 4 in)	72 kg (159 lb)	325 cm (128 in)	298 cm (117 in)	(Poland) Atom Trefl Sopot
4	Izabela Bełcik (C)	29 November 1980	1.86 m (6 ft 1 in)	70 kg (150 lb)	310 cm (120 in)	298 cm (117 in)	(Poland) Atom Trefl Sopot
5	Agnieszka Kąkolewska	17 October 1994	1.99 m (6 ft 6 in)	85 kg (187 lb)	320 cm (130 in)	310 cm (120 in)	(Poland) Impel Wrocław
6	Agnieszka Bednarek-Kasza	20 February 1986	1.85 m (6 ft 1 in)	69 kg (152 lb)	310 cm (120 in)	297 cm (117 in)	(Poland) Chemik Police
7	Anna Miros	30 October 1985	1.96 m (6 ft 5 in)	79 kg (174 lb)	325 cm (128 in)	305 cm (120 in)	(Poland) Atom Trefl Sopot
8	Katarzyna Zaroślińska	3 February 1987	1.87 m (6 ft 2 in)	80 kg (180 lb)	322 cm (127 in)	310 cm (120 in)	(Poland) Atom Trefl Sopot
9	Agata Sawicka	17 January 1985	1.81 m (5 ft 11 in)	74 kg (163 lb)	295 cm (116 in)	285 cm (112 in)	(Poland) Impel Wrocław
10	Daria Paszek	30 August 1991	1.86 m (6 ft 1 in)	75 kg (165 lb)	290 cm (110 in)	280 cm (110 in)	(Poland) Legionovia Legionowo
11	Sylwia Pycia	20 April 1981	1.84 m (6 ft 0 in)	70 kg (150 lb)	302 cm (119 in)	283 cm (111 in)	(Poland) Budowlani Łódź
13	Agata Durajczyk	19 August 1989	1.70 m (5 ft 7 in)	63 kg (139 lb)	288 cm (113 in)	275 cm (108 in)	(Poland) Atom Trefl Sopot
14	Joanna Wołosz	6 April 1990	1.81 m (5 ft 11 in)	66 kg (146 lb)	303 cm (119 in)	290 cm (110 in)	(Poland) Chemik Police
15	Natalia Kurnikowska	13 January 1992	1.84 m (6 ft 0 in)	69 kg (152 lb)	305 cm (120 in)	296 cm (117 in)	(Poland) Muszynianka Muszyna
17	Katarzyna Skowrońska-Dolata	30 June 1983	1.89 m (6 ft 2 in)	73 kg (161 lb)	317 cm (125 in)	302 cm (119 in)	(Poland) Impel Wrocław

=== Romania ===
The following is the Romanian roster in the 2015 European Games.

Head coach: Guillermo Gallardo

No.	Name	Date of birth	Height	Weight	Spike	Block	2015 club
1	Valentina Ivanof	9 February 1985	1.86 m (6 ft 1 in)	74 kg (163 lb)	305 cm (120 in)	300 cm (120 in)	(Romania) CS Volei Alba-Blaj
2	Irina Radu	17 February 1983	1.81 m (5 ft 11 in)	72 kg (159 lb)	292 cm (115 in)	290 cm (110 in)	(Romania) CS Știința Bacău
3	Roxana Bacsis	19 August 1988	1.90 m (6 ft 3 in)	72 kg (159 lb)	305 cm (120 in)	295 cm (116 in)	(Romania) CSM București
4	Alexandra Trica	21 October 1985	1.82 m (6 ft 0 in)	70 kg (150 lb)	305 cm (120 in)	290 cm (110 in)	(Romania) CSM Târgoviște
6	Mihaela Albu	1 January 1994	1.68 m (5 ft 6 in)	52 kg (115 lb)	264 cm (104 in)	258 cm (102 in)	(Romania) CS Știința Bacău
7	Liana Badea	9 August 1989	1.86 m (6 ft 1 in)	70 kg (150 lb)	315 cm (124 in)	290 cm (110 in)	(Romania) Dinamo București
9	Diana Calota (C)	24 May 1986	1.79 m (5 ft 10 in)	63 kg (139 lb)	290 cm (110 in)	280 cm (110 in)	(Romania) CSM Târgoviște
10	Nicoleta Manu	3 December 1980	1.74 m (5 ft 9 in)	67 kg (148 lb)	275 cm (108 in)	260 cm (100 in)	(Romania) Dinamo București
11	Ioana Nemtanu	1 January 1989	1.84 m (6 ft 0 in)	80 kg (180 lb)	295 cm (116 in)	286 cm (113 in)	(Romania) CS Volei Alba-Blaj
12	Adina Salaoru	5 August 1989	1.84 m (6 ft 0 in)	67 kg (148 lb)	305 cm (120 in)	301 cm (119 in)	(Romania) CS Volei Alba-Blaj
13	Sabina Moisa	4 December 1990	1.90 m (6 ft 3 in)	73 kg (161 lb)	300 cm (120 in)	295 cm (116 in)	(Romania) CS Știința Bacău
15	Georgiana Fales	4 February 1986	1.86 m (6 ft 1 in)	75 kg (165 lb)	305 cm (120 in)	290 cm (110 in)	(Romania) CSM București
17	Daiana Muresan	6 July 1990	1.91 m (6 ft 3 in)	75 kg (165 lb)	315 cm (124 in)	310 cm (120 in)	(Italy) Pallavolo Scandicci
18	Nneka Onyejekwe	18 August 1989	1.88 m (6 ft 2 in)	74 kg (163 lb)	319 cm (126 in)	301 cm (119 in)	(France) RC Cannes

=== Turkey ===
The following is the Turkish roster in the 2015 European Games.

Head coach: Ferhat Akbas

No.	Name	Date of birth	Height	Weight	Spike	Block	2015 club
2	Merve Dalbeler	27 June 1987	1.82 m (6 ft 0 in)	73 kg (161 lb)	310 cm (120 in)	300 cm (120 in)	(Turkey) Fenerbahçe
3	Gizem Karadayı	14 January 1987	1.78 m (5 ft 10 in)	60 kg (130 lb)	290 cm (110 in)	285 cm (112 in)	(Turkey) Fenerbahçe
4	Dicle Nur Babat	15 September 1992	1.90 m (6 ft 3 in)	78 kg (172 lb)	296 cm (117 in)	289 cm (114 in)	(Turkey) Fenerbahçe
5	Kübra Akman	13 October 1994	1.97 m (6 ft 6 in)	89 kg (196 lb)	314 cm (124 in)	305 cm (120 in)	(Turkey) Vakıfbank
6	Polen Uslupehlivan	27 August 1990	1.93 m (6 ft 4 in)	65 kg (143 lb)	305 cm (120 in)	298 cm (117 in)	(Turkey) Fenerbahçe
7	Seda Aslanyurek	25 June 1986	1.92 m (6 ft 4 in)	70 kg (150 lb)	310 cm (120 in)	303 cm (119 in)	(Turkey) Vakıfbank
9	Büşra Cansu	16 July 1990	1.88 m (6 ft 2 in)	84 kg (185 lb)	297 cm (117 in)	291 cm (115 in)	(Turkey) Eczacıbaşı
10	Güldeniz Önal (C)	25 March 1986	1.83 m (6 ft 0 in)	75 kg (165 lb)	302 cm (119 in)	293 cm (115 in)	(Turkey) Galatasaray
11	Naz Aydemir	14 August 1990	1.86 m (6 ft 1 in)	75 kg (165 lb)	290 cm (110 in)	249 cm (98 in)	(Turkey) Vakıfbank
13	Neriman Özsoy	13 July 1988	1.88 m (6 ft 2 in)	76 kg (168 lb)	310 cm (120 in)	291 cm (115 in)	(Turkey) Eczacıbaşı
14	Gözde Yılmaz	9 September 1991	1.95 m (6 ft 5 in)	82 kg (181 lb)	306 cm (120 in)	299 cm (118 in)	(Italy) Busto Arsizio Volley
16	Meliha İsmailoğlu	17 September 1993	1.88 m (6 ft 2 in)	70 kg (150 lb)	304 cm (120 in)	301 cm (119 in)	(Turkey) Fenerbahçe
18	Asli Kalac	13 December 1995	1.83 m (6 ft 0 in)	73 kg (161 lb)	300 cm (120 in)	290 cm (110 in)	(Turkey) Galatasaray
20	Çağla Akın	19 January 1995	1.77 m (5 ft 10 in)	70 kg (150 lb)	287 cm (113 in)	280 cm (110 in)	(Turkey) Vakıfbank

== Pool B ==
=== Bulgaria ===
The following is the Bulgarian roster in the 2015 European Games.

Head coach: Aleksandr Chervyakov

No.	Name	Date of birth	Height	Weight	Spike	Block	2015 club
3	Nasya Dimitrova	6 November 1992	1.87 m (6 ft 2 in)	60 kg (130 lb)	300 cm (120 in)	290 cm (110 in)	(Azerbaijan) Azerrail Baku
4	Lora Kitipova	19 May 1991	1.84 m (6 ft 0 in)	66 kg (146 lb)	290 cm (110 in)	283 cm (111 in)	(Azerbaijan) Azerrail Baku
5	Dobriana Rabadzhieva	14 June 1991	1.94 m (6 ft 4 in)	72 kg (159 lb)	305 cm (120 in)	285 cm (112 in)	(Switzerland) Voléro Zürich
7	Gabriela Koeva	25 July 1989	1.85 m (6 ft 1 in)	66 kg (146 lb)	295 cm (116 in)	290 cm (110 in)	(Turkey) Beşiktaş
9	Petya Barakova	18 June 1994	1.75 m (5 ft 9 in)	64 kg (141 lb)	293 cm (115 in)	288 cm (113 in)	(Bulgaria) Levski Volley
10	Gergana Dimitrova	28 February 1996	1.83 m (6 ft 0 in)	71 kg (157 lb)	300 cm (120 in)	291 cm (115 in)	(Switzerland) Smaesch Pfeffingen
11	Hristina Ruseva	1 October 1991	1.90 m (6 ft 3 in)	77 kg (170 lb)	305 cm (120 in)	290 cm (110 in)	(Azerbaijan) Telekom Baku
13	Mariya Filipova	10 September 1982	1.78 m (5 ft 10 in)	68 kg (150 lb)	295 cm (116 in)	275 cm (108 in)	(Italy) Volley 2002 Forlì
14	Silvana Chausheva	19 May 1995	1.88 m (6 ft 2 in)	74 kg (163 lb)	305 cm (120 in)	293 cm (115 in)	(Bulgaria) VC Maritsa
15	Zhana Torodova	6 January 1997	1.70 m (5 ft 7 in)	56 kg (123 lb)	280 cm (110 in)	270 cm (110 in)	(Bulgaria) VC Maritsa
16	Elitsa Vasileva (C)	13 May 1990	1.90 m (6 ft 3 in)	73 kg (161 lb)	302 cm (119 in)	290 cm (110 in)	(Russia) Dynamo Kazan
18	Emiliya Nikolova	26 December 1991	1.85 m (6 ft 1 in)	59 kg (130 lb)	302 cm (119 in)	287 cm (113 in)	(Italy) Pallavolo Scandicci
20	Mira Todorova	12 April 1994	1.87 m (6 ft 2 in)	69 kg (152 lb)	310 cm (120 in)	301 cm (119 in)	(Switzerland) Smaesch Pfeffingen
22	Simona Dimitrova	17 July 1994	1.86 m (6 ft 1 in)	81 kg (179 lb)	300 cm (120 in)	291 cm (115 in)	(Hungary) TFSE

=== Croatia ===
The following is the Croatian roster in the 2015 European Games.

Head coach: (Brazil) Angelo Vercesi

No.	Name	Date of birth	Height	Weight	Spike	Block	2015 club
1	Senna Ušić (C)	14 May 1986	1.91 m (6 ft 3 in)	78 kg (172 lb)	302 cm (119 in)	292 cm (115 in)	(Italy) Pallavolo Scandicci
2	Ana Grbac	23 March 1988	1.87 m (6 ft 2 in)	64 kg (141 lb)	298 cm (117 in)	288 cm (113 in)	(Switzerland) Voléro Zürich
3	Nikolina Bozicevic	14 January 1995	1.67 m (5 ft 6 in)	56 kg (123 lb)	281 cm (111 in)	270 cm (110 in)	(Croatia) HAOK Mladost
4	Nikolina Jelić	9 November 1991	1.88 m (6 ft 2 in)	69 kg (152 lb)	254 cm (100 in)	250 cm (98 in)	(Germany) Vfb 91 Suhl
5	Dinka Kulić	2 August 1997	1.87 m (6 ft 2 in)	70 kg (150 lb)	300 cm (120 in)	288 cm (113 in)	(Croatia) Zok Vibrobeton
9	Maja Burazer	20 March 1988	1.90 m (6 ft 3 in)	80 kg (180 lb)	315 cm (124 in)	310 cm (120 in)	(Germany) Ladies in Black Aachen
12	Tamara Sušić	28 November 1990	1.92 m (6 ft 4 in)	76 kg (168 lb)	318 cm (125 in)	307 cm (121 in)	(Croatia) HAOK Mladost
13	Samanta Fabris	8 February 1992	1.90 m (6 ft 3 in)	80 kg (180 lb)	316 cm (124 in)	306 cm (120 in)	(Italy) AGIL Volley
14	Karla Klarić	5 September 1994	1.90 m (6 ft 3 in)	85 kg (187 lb)	317 cm (125 in)	308 cm (121 in)	(Romania) CSM București
16	Vedrana Jakšetic	17 September 1996	1.83 m (6 ft 0 in)	72 kg (159 lb)	308 cm (121 in)	297 cm (117 in)	(Croatia) OK Poreč
21	Marija Ušić	5 February 1992	1.82 m (6 ft 0 in)	69 kg (152 lb)	304 cm (120 in)	295 cm (116 in)	(Belgium) Datovoc Tongeren
22	Marija Prsa	27 November 1989	1.78 m (5 ft 10 in)	68 kg (150 lb)	302 cm (119 in)	293 cm (115 in)	(Italy) Volley 2002 Forlì

=== Germany ===
The following is the German roster in the 2015 European Games.

Head coach: (Italy) Luciano Pedullà

No.	Name	Date of birth	Height	Weight	Spike	Block	2015 club
1	Lenka Dürr	10 December 1990	1.71 m (5 ft 7 in)	59 kg (130 lb)	280 cm (110 in)	270 cm (110 in)	(Azerbaijan) Azeryol Baku
2	Kathleen Weiß	2 February 1984	1.71 m (5 ft 7 in)	66 kg (146 lb)	290 cm (110 in)	273 cm (107 in)	(Czech Republic) VK Prostějov
4	Maren Brinker	10 July 1986	1.84 m (6 ft 0 in)	68 kg (150 lb)	303 cm (119 in)	295 cm (116 in)	(Italy) Promoball Flero
6	Jennifer Geerties	5 April 1994	1.84 m (6 ft 0 in)	58 kg (128 lb)	298 cm (117 in)	288 cm (113 in)	(Germany) Schweriner SC
8	Louisa Lippmann	23 September 1984	1.91 m (6 ft 3 in)	78 kg (172 lb)	319 cm (126 in)	312 cm (123 in)	(Germany) Schweriner SC
9	Leonie Schwertmann	12 January 1994	1.90 m (6 ft 3 in)	80 kg (180 lb)	314 cm (124 in)	307 cm (121 in)	(Germany) USC Münster
10	Lena Stigrot	20 December 1994	1.84 m (6 ft 0 in)	68 kg (150 lb)	303 cm (119 in)	295 cm (116 in)	(Germany) Rote Raben Vilsbiburg
12	Anja Brandt	15 February 1990	1.95 m (6 ft 5 in)	77 kg (170 lb)	310 cm (120 in)	295 cm (116 in)	(Germany) Schweriner SC
13	Saskia Hippe	16 January 1991	1.85 m (6 ft 1 in)	67 kg (148 lb)	315 cm (124 in)	292 cm (115 in)	(Germany) Schweriner SC
14	Margareta Kozuch (C)	30 October 1986	1.87 m (6 ft 2 in)	70 kg (150 lb)	309 cm (122 in)	297 cm (117 in)	(Italy) Nordameccanica Piacenza
15	Lisa Thomsen	20 August 1985	1.72 m (5 ft 8 in)	68 kg (150 lb)	290 cm (110 in)	285 cm (112 in)	(Azerbaijan) Lokomotiv Baku
17	Laura Weihenmaier	4 April 1991	1.80 m (5 ft 11 in)	70 kg (150 lb)	297 cm (117 in)	286 cm (113 in)	(Germany) Schweriner SC
18	Wiebke Silge	16 July 1996	1.90 m (6 ft 3 in)	75 kg (165 lb)	302 cm (119 in)	291 cm (115 in)	(Germany) USC Münster
20	Mareen Apitz	26 March 1987	1.83 m (6 ft 0 in)	73 kg (161 lb)	295 cm (116 in)	284 cm (112 in)	(France) RC Cannes

=== Netherlands ===
The following is the Dutch roster in the 2015 European Games.

Head coach: (Italy) Giovanni Guidetti

No.	Name	Date of birth	Height	Weight	Spike	Block	2015 club
2	Femke Stoltenborg	30 July 1991	1.90 m (6 ft 3 in)	79 kg (174 lb)	303 cm (119 in)	299 cm (118 in)	(Italy) Forlì
3	Yvon Belien	28 December 1993	1.88 m (6 ft 2 in)	73 kg (161 lb)	307 cm (121 in)	303 cm (119 in)	(Italy) Nordameccanica Piacenza
4	Celeste Plak	26 October 1995	1.90 m (6 ft 3 in)	84 kg (185 lb)	314 cm (124 in)	302 cm (119 in)	(Italy) Volley Bergamo
5	Robin de Kruijf	5 May 1991	1.93 m (6 ft 4 in)	79 kg (174 lb)	313 cm (123 in)	300 cm (120 in)	(Turkey) VakifBank Istanbul
6	Maret Grothues (C)	16 September 1988	1.80 m (5 ft 11 in)	68 kg (150 lb)	304 cm (120 in)	285 cm (112 in)	(Poland) Atom Trefl Sopot
7	Quinta Steenbergen	2 April 1985	1.89 m (6 ft 2 in)	74 kg (163 lb)	309 cm (122 in)	300 cm (120 in)	(Azerbaijan) Lokomotiv Baku
8	Judith Pietersen	3 July 1989	1.88 m (6 ft 2 in)	73 kg (161 lb)	306 cm (120 in)	296 cm (117 in)	(Turkey) Trabzon İdmanocağı
9	Myrthe Schoot	29 August 1988	1.84 m (6 ft 0 in)	69 kg (152 lb)	298 cm (117 in)	286 cm (113 in)	(Germany) Dresdner SC
10	Lonneke Slöetjes	15 November 1990	1.92 m (6 ft 4 in)	76 kg (168 lb)	322 cm (127 in)	315 cm (124 in)	(Turkey) VakifBank Istanbul
11	Anne Buijs	2 December 1991	1.91 m (6 ft 3 in)	75 kg (165 lb)	317 cm (125 in)	299 cm (118 in)	(Turkey) VakifBank Istanbul
14	Laura Dijkema	18 February 1990	1.84 m (6 ft 0 in)	70 kg (150 lb)	293 cm (115 in)	279 cm (110 in)	(Germany) Dresdner SC
16	Debby Stam	24 July 1984	1.84 m (6 ft 0 in)	69 kg (152 lb)	303 cm (119 in)	281 cm (111 in)	Unattached
17	Nicole Luttikhuis	26 December 1997	1.91 m (6 ft 3 in)	74 kg (163 lb)	298 cm (117 in)	287 cm (113 in)	(Netherlands) Talent Team Papendal
22	Nicole Koolhaas	31 January 1991	1.98 m (6 ft 6 in)	77 kg (170 lb)	310 cm (120 in)	300 cm (120 in)	(Switzerland) VFM Volley Franches-Montagnes

=== Russia ===
The following is the Russian roster in the 2015 European Games.

Head coach: Vadim Pankov

No.	Name	Date of birth	Height	Weight	Spike	Block	2015 club
3	Anastasia Bavykina	6 July 1992	1.88 m (6 ft 2 in)	73 kg (161 lb)	313 cm (123 in)	300 cm (120 in)	(Russia) Zarechie Odintsovo
7	Ekaterina Romanenko	23 December 1993	1.70 m (5 ft 7 in)	62 kg (137 lb)	289 cm (114 in)	285 cm (112 in)	(Russia) Zarechie Odintsovo
8	Daria Pisarenko	22 April 1991	1.90 m (6 ft 3 in)	71 kg (157 lb)	305 cm (120 in)	190 cm (75 in)	(Russia) Uralochka
9	Daria Isaeva	29 March 1990	1.86 m (6 ft 1 in)	75 kg (165 lb)	310 cm (120 in)	304 cm (120 in)	(Russia) Omichka Omsk
11	Anna Matienko (C)	12 July 1981	1.82 m (6 ft 0 in)	68 kg (150 lb)	298 cm (117 in)	292 cm (115 in)	(Russia) Uralochka
12	Irina Zaryazhko	4 October 1991	1.96 m (6 ft 5 in)	78 kg (172 lb)	305 cm (120 in)	290 cm (110 in)	(Russia) Uralochka
14	Irina Filishtinskaia	14 June 1990	1.70 m (5 ft 7 in)	65 kg (143 lb)	285 cm (112 in)	275 cm (108 in)	(Russia) Dinamo Krasnodar
15	Anastasia Chernaya	20 March 1987	1.88 m (6 ft 2 in)	77 kg (170 lb)	307 cm (121 in)	296 cm (117 in)	(Russia) Avtodor-Metar
16	Yuliya Podskalnaya	18 April 1989	1.90 m (6 ft 3 in)	75 kg (165 lb)	306 cm (120 in)	295 cm (116 in)	(Russia) Dinamo Krasnodar
17	Kristina Kurnosova	17 June 1997	1.71 m (5 ft 7 in)	62 kg (137 lb)	288 cm (113 in)	278 cm (109 in)	Unattached
18	Irina Malkova	23 March 1989	1.92 m (6 ft 4 in)	80 kg (180 lb)	306 cm (120 in)	294 cm (116 in)	(Russia) Dinamo Kazan
19	Irina Voronkova	20 October 1995	1.90 m (6 ft 3 in)	84 kg (185 lb)	305 cm (120 in)	290 cm (110 in)	(Russia) Zarechie Odintsovo
20	Olesya Nikolaeva	18 March 1994	1.87 m (6 ft 2 in)	66 kg (146 lb)	301 cm (119 in)	284 cm (112 in)	(Russia) Dinamo Kazan

=== Serbia ===
The following is the Serbian roster in the 2015 European Games.

Head coach: Zoran Terzić

No.	Name	Date of birth	Height	Weight	Spike	Block	2015 club
1	Maja Savić	14 August 1993	1.89 m (6 ft 2 in)	70 kg (150 lb)	305 cm (120 in)	295 cm (116 in)	(Serbia) Partizan Vizura
2	Marta Drpa	20 April 1989	1.92 m (6 ft 4 in)	73 kg (161 lb)	304 cm (120 in)	292 cm (115 in)	(Serbia) Spartak Subotica
4	Bojana Živković	29 March 1988	1.86 m (6 ft 1 in)	72 kg (159 lb)	300 cm (120 in)	292 cm (115 in)	(Turkey) İller Bankası
5	Mina Popović	16 September 1994	1.87 m (6 ft 2 in)	73 kg (161 lb)	315 cm (124 in)	305 cm (120 in)	(Serbia) Crvena Zvezda
6	Tijana Malešević	18 March 1991	1.85 m (6 ft 1 in)	78 kg (172 lb)	300 cm (120 in)	286 cm (113 in)	(Czech Republic) VK Prostějov
7	Brižitka Molnar	28 July 1985	1.82 m (6 ft 0 in)	69 kg (152 lb)	304 cm (120 in)	290 cm (110 in)	(China) Tianjin
9	Brankica Mihajlović	13 April 1991	1.89 m (6 ft 2 in)	64 kg (141 lb)	282 cm (111 in)	264 cm (104 in)	(Japan) Hisamitsu Springs
12	Jelena Nikolić (C)	13 April 1982	1.94 m (6 ft 4 in)	79 kg (174 lb)	315 cm (124 in)	300 cm (120 in)	(Azerbaijan) Azerrail Baku
13	Ana Bjelica	3 April 1992	1.90 m (6 ft 3 in)	78 kg (172 lb)	310 cm (120 in)	305 cm (120 in)	(Poland) KPS Chemik Police
15	Jovana Stevanović	30 June 1992	1.92 m (6 ft 4 in)	72 kg (159 lb)	308 cm (121 in)	295 cm (116 in)	(Italy) Pomi Casalmaggiore
16	Milena Rašić	25 October 1990	1.93 m (6 ft 4 in)	75 kg (165 lb)	303 cm (119 in)	293 cm (115 in)	(Turkey) Vakıfbank Istanbul
17	Silvija Popović	15 March 1986	1.78 m (5 ft 10 in)	65 kg (143 lb)	236 cm (93 in)	226 cm (89 in)	(Switzerland) Voléro Zürich
20	Slađana Mirković	7 October 1995	1.85 m (6 ft 1 in)	78 kg (172 lb)	293 cm (115 in)	282 cm (111 in)	(Serbia) Partizan Vizura
21	Bianka Buša	25 July 1994	1.87 m (6 ft 2 in)	74 kg (163 lb)	293 cm (115 in)	282 cm (111 in)	(Serbia) Partizan Vizura
