= Klaudia Kaczorowska =

Polish volleyball player (born 1988)

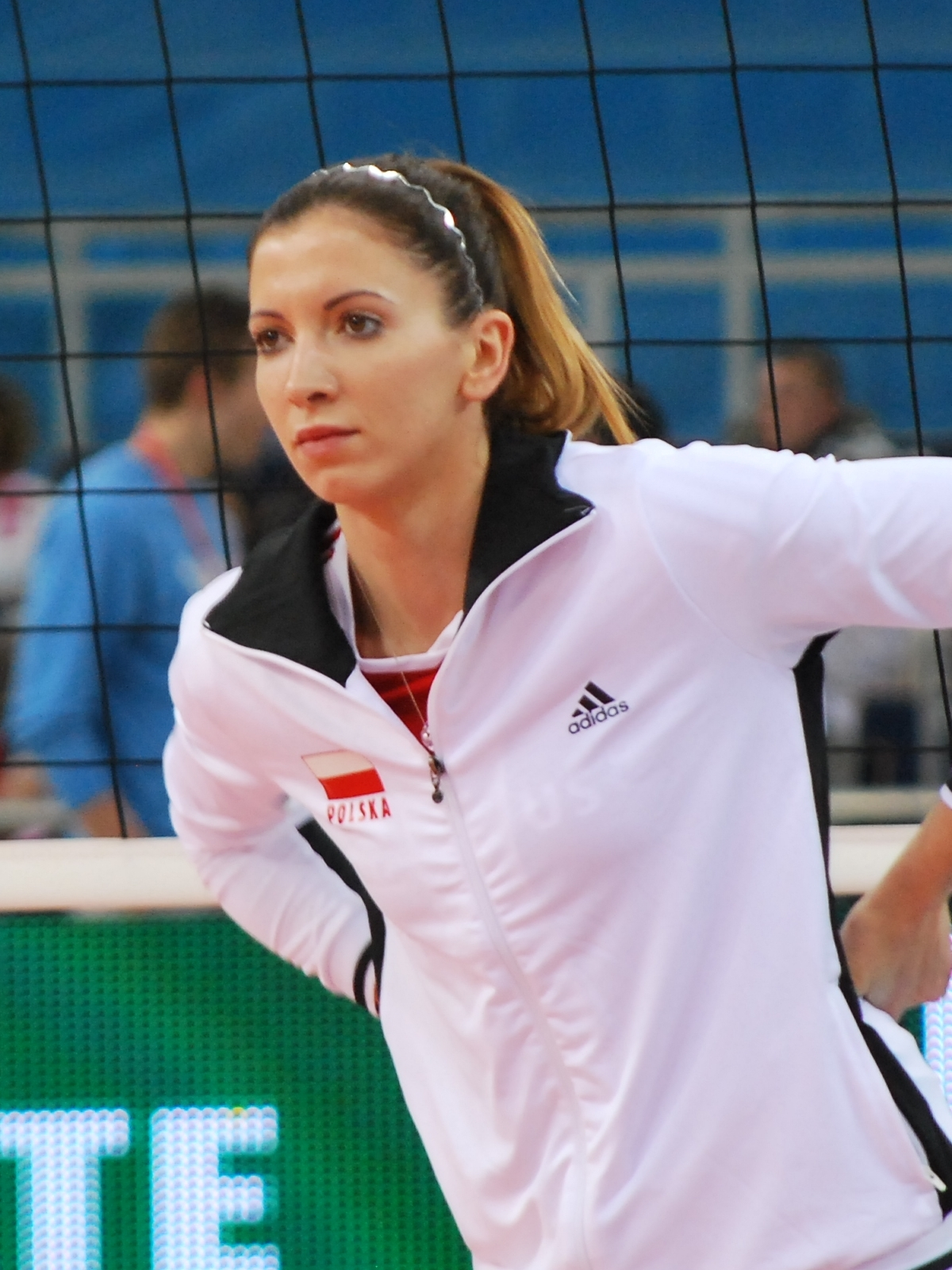

Personal information
- Full name: Klaudia Kaczorowska
- Nationality: Polish
- Born: 20 December 1988 (age 37); Trzcianka, Poland
- Height: 1.83 m (6 ft 0 in)
- Weight: 66 kg (146 lb)
- Spike: 317 cm (125 in)
- Block: 300 cm (120 in)

Volleyball information
- Position: Outside hitter
- Current team: (Greece) PAOK
- Number: 16 (club), 8 (national team)

Career
| Years | Teams |
|---|---|
| 2003–2004; 2004–2007; 2007–2010; 2010–2011; 2011–2012; 2012– | (Poland) MKS MDK Trzcianka (Poland) PTPS Farmutil Piła (Poland) SMS PZPS Sosnowiec (Poland) PTPS Farmutil Piła (Poland) Muszynianka Muszyna (Poland) BKS Stal Bielsko-Biała (Poland) PGE Atom Trefl Sopot |

National team
| 2007– | Poland |
Honours
Representing Poland
Women's volleyball
European Championship
| Bronze medal – third place | 2009 Poland |
European League
| Bronze medal – third place | 2014 Germany |
- Last updated: 10 June 2015

Klaudia Kaczorowska (born 20 December 1988) is a Polish volleyball player, a member of Poland women's national volleyball team and Polish club PGE Atom Trefl Sopot, bronze medalist of European Championship 2009, and Polish Champion (2011, 2013).

== Career ==
In 2012, Kaczorowska went to Polish club Atom Trefl Sopot. On March 15, 2015 she achieved with the team from Sopot the Polish Cup 2015. In May 2015 she signed a new contract with her current team.

== Sporting achievements ==
=== Clubs ===
==== CEV Cup ====
- 2014/2015 - with PGE Atom Trefl Sopot

==== National championships ====
- 2007/2008 Polish Cup, with PTPS Farmutil Piła
- 2007/2008 Polish Championship, with PTPS Farmutil Piła
- 2008/2009 Polish SuperCup 2008, with PTPS Farmutil Piła
- 2008/2009 Polish Championship, with PTPS Farmutil Piła
- 2010/2011 Polish Cup, with Bank BPS Muszynianka Fakro Muszyna
- 2010/2011 Polish Championship, with Bank BPS Muszynianka Fakro Muszyna
- 2012/2013 Polish Championship, with PGE Atom Trefl Sopot
- 2013/2014 Polish Championship, with PGE Atom Trefl Sopot
- 2014/2015 Polish Cup, with PGE Atom Trefl Sopot

=== National team ===
- 2009 Universiade
- 2009 CEV European Championship
- 2014 European League

=== Individually ===
- 2008 Polish Cup - Best Server
- 2015 Polish Cup - Best Server
- 2015 Polish Cup - Most Valuable Player
