= Daria Paszek =

Polish volleyball player (born 1991)

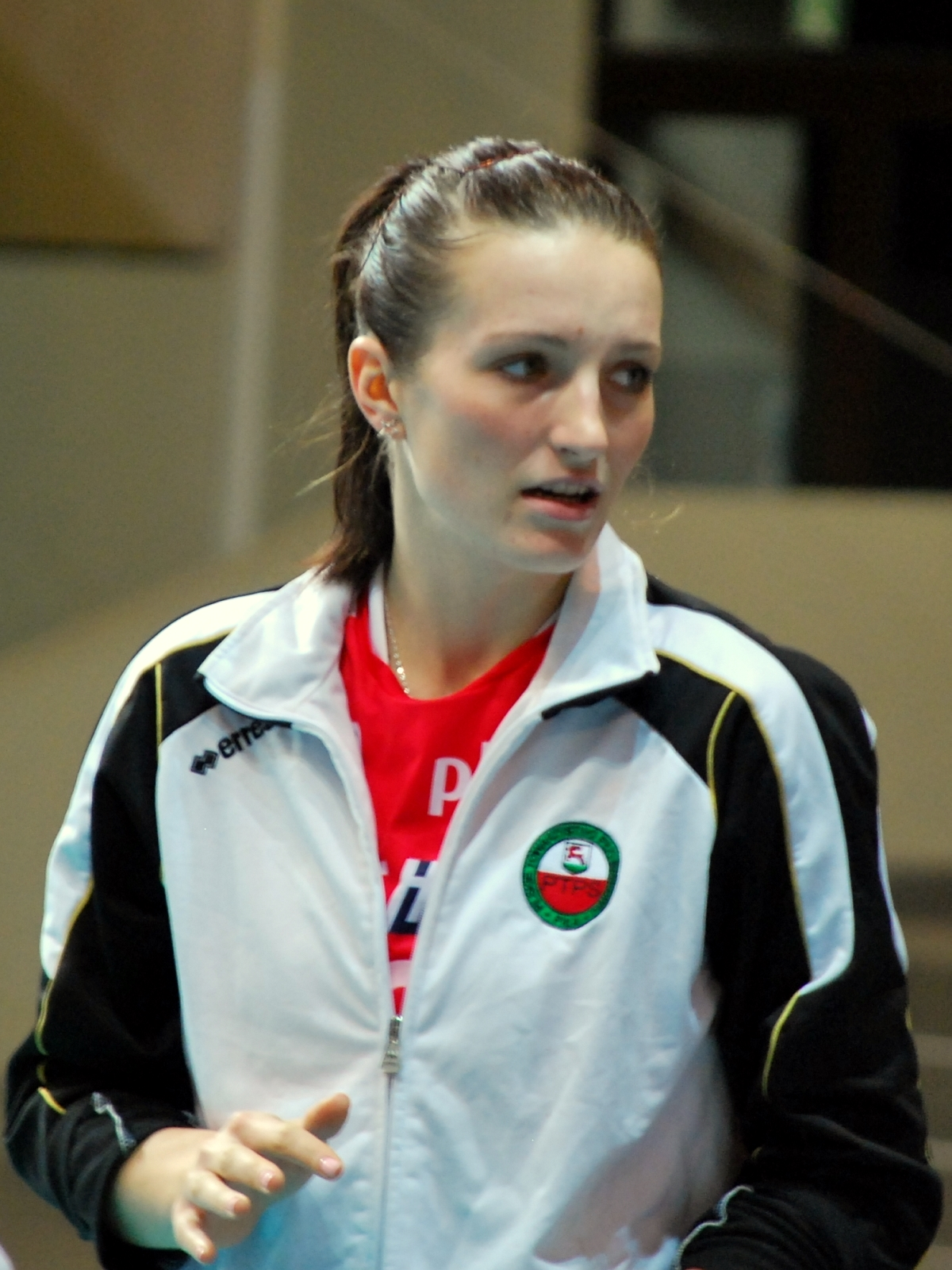
- Paszek in 2011

Personal information
- Nationality: Poland
- Born: 30 August 1991 (age 35); Krotoszyn, Poland
- Height: 1.85 m (6 ft 1 in)
- Weight: 76 kg (168 lb)
- Spike: 303 cm (119 in)
- Block: 294 cm (116 in)

Volleyball information
- Position: Outside hitter
- Current club: MKS Dąbrowa Górnicza
- Number: 8 (club), 10 (national team)

Career
Years	Teams
	Astra Krotoszyn
2007–2008	Winiary Kalisz
2008–2009	AZS AWF Poznań
2009–2014	Nafta-Gaz Piła
2014–2016	LTS Legionovia Legionowo
2016–	MKS Dąbrowa Górnicza

National team
2014–	Poland
Honours
Women's volleyball
Representing Poland
European League
Bronze medal – third place	2014
European Games
Silver medal – second place	2015 Baku
- Last updated: 12 December 2016

Daria Przybylak (née Paszek, born 30 August 1991) is a Polish volleyball player, who plays for MKS Dąbrowa Górnicza and is a member of Poland women's national volleyball team. She is a bronze medallist of the European League and a silver medallist of the European Games.

== Career ==
Paszek took part in the 1st edition of the European Games. In the semifinal her national team beat Serbia and qualified to the final match. On 27 June 2015, Poland was beaten by Turkey and Paszek with her teammates achieved the silver medal.

On June 27, 2018 it was announced that she will move to Germany and join the 8th team of Rote Raben Vilsbiburg, Vilsbiburg of Deutsche Volleyball-Bundesliga. For the first time she will be playing under her new name after her marriage in February.

=== Clubs ===
- (Poland) Astra Krotoszyn
- (Poland) Winiary Kalisz (2007–2008)
- (Poland) AZS AWF Poznań (2008–2009)
- (Poland) Nafta-Gaz Piła (2009–2014)
- (Poland) LTS Legionovia Legionowo (2014–2016)
- (Poland) MKS Dąbrowa Górnicza (2016–2017)
- (Poland) Trefl Proxima Kraków (2017–2018)
- (Germany) Rote Raben Vilsbiburg (2018–present)

== Sporting achievements ==
=== National team ===
- 2014 European League
- 2015 European Games
