= Legionovia Legionowo =

Legionovia Legionowo can refer to the following:

- Legionovia Legionowo (football)
- Legionovia Legionowo (women's volleyball)
