= Maja Tokarska =

Polish volleyball player (born 1991)

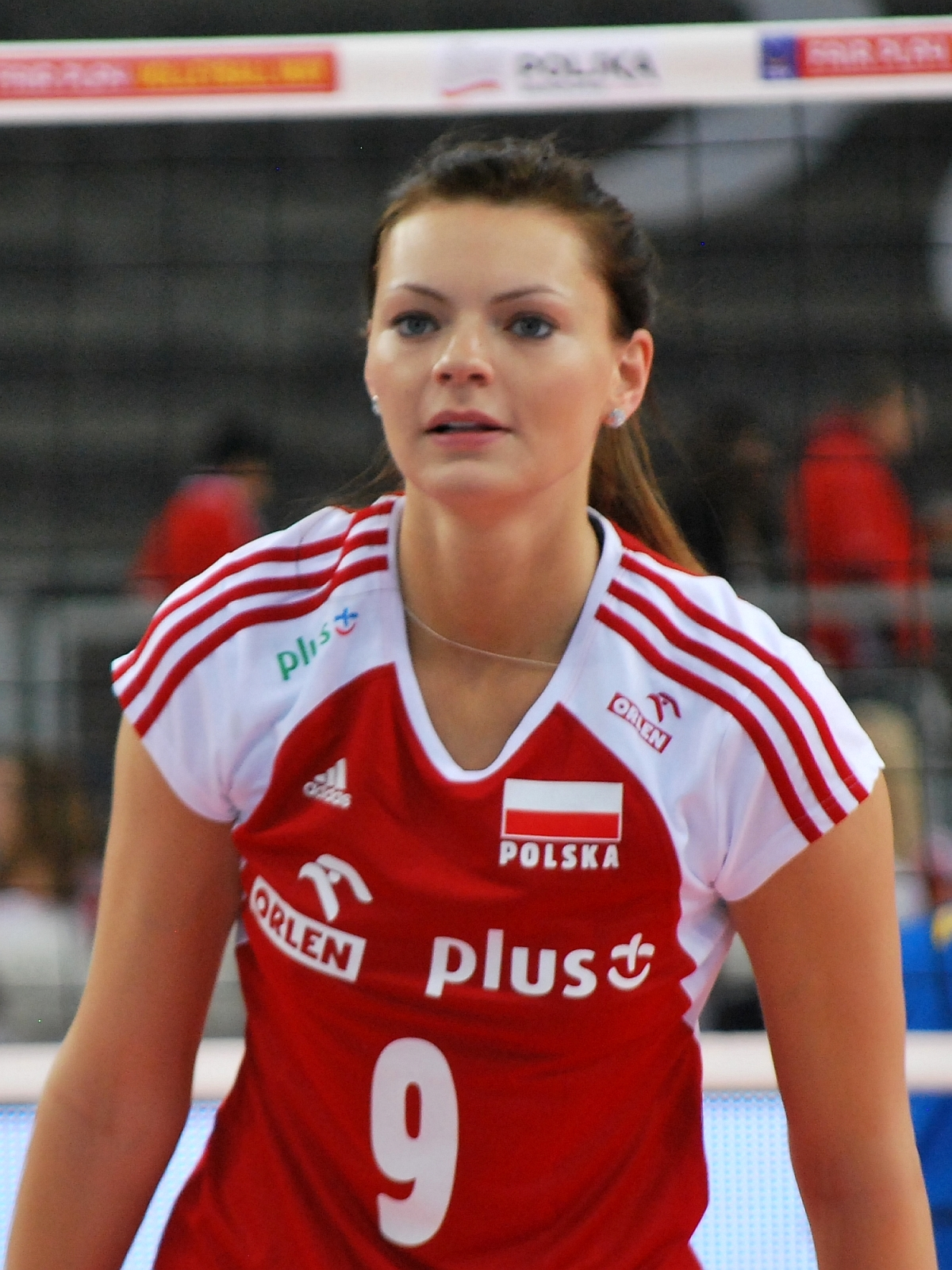

Personal information
- Full name: Maja Tokarska
- Nationality: Polish
- Born: February 22, 1991 (age 35); Gdańsk, Poland
- Height: 1.93 m (6 ft 4 in)
- Weight: 72 kg (159 lb)
- Spike: 325 cm (128 in)
- Block: 305 cm (120 in)

Volleyball information
- Position: Middle blocker
- Current club: (Poland) Legionovia Legionowo
- Number: 1 (club), 9 (national team)

Career
| Years | Teams |
|---|---|
| 2005–2008; 2008–2009; 2009–2010; 2010–2011; 2011–2012; 2012–2013; 2013–2014; 2014–2016; 2016-2017; 2017--2018; 2018–2019; 2019–2022 | (Poland) Gedania Gdańsk (Poland) SMS PZPS Sosnowiec (Poland) Gedania Gdańsk (Poland) PTPS Piła (Poland) Impel Wrocław (Poland) Trefl Sopot (Poland) MKS Dąbrowa Górnicza (Italy) AGIL Volley (Poland) Trefl Sopot (Japan) Hisamitsu Springs (Turkey) Beşiktaş (Poland) KS Developres Rzeszów (Poland) Legionovia Legionowo |

National team
| 2010– | Poland |
Honours
Representing Poland
Women's volleyball
European League
| Bronze medal – third place | 2014 |
European Games
| Silver medal – second place | 2015 Baku |
- Last updated: 3 September 2024

Maja Tokarska (born 22 February 1991) is a Polish volleyball player, a member of the national team and Polish club Legionovia Legionowo.

Internationally she was the bronze medalist of European League and silver medalist of European Games, as well as winning multiple domestic club honours in Poland and Japan.

== Career ==
She took part in 1st edition of European Games. On June 27, 2015 Poland was beaten by Turkey and Tokarska with her teammates achieved silver medal.

== Sporting achievements ==
=== Clubs ===
- 2012 Polish League Championship – Champion, with Trefl Sopot
- 2012 Polish Cup – Runner-up, with Trefl Sopot
- 2013 Polish League Championship – Runner-up, with MKS Dąbrowa Górnicza
- 2013 Polish Cup – Champion, with MKS Dąbrowa Górnicza
- 2015 Polish League Championship – Runner-up, with Trefl Sopot
- 2015 Polish League Championship – Champion, with Trefl Sopot
- 2015 CEV Cup – Runner-up, with Trefl Sopot
- 2016 Polish League Championship – Runner-up, with Trefl Sopot
- 2016 Polish Cup – Runner-up, with Trefl Sopot
- 2017 Japanese League Championship – Runner-up, with Hisamitsu Springs
- 2017 Japanese Cup – Runner-up, with Hisamitsu Springs
- 2019 Polish League Championship – podium finish, with Trefl Sopot
- 2022 Polish Cup - Champion with Legionovia Legionowo

=== National team ===
- 2014 European League
- 2015 European Games
