= Mariola Zenik =

Polish volleyball player (born 1982)

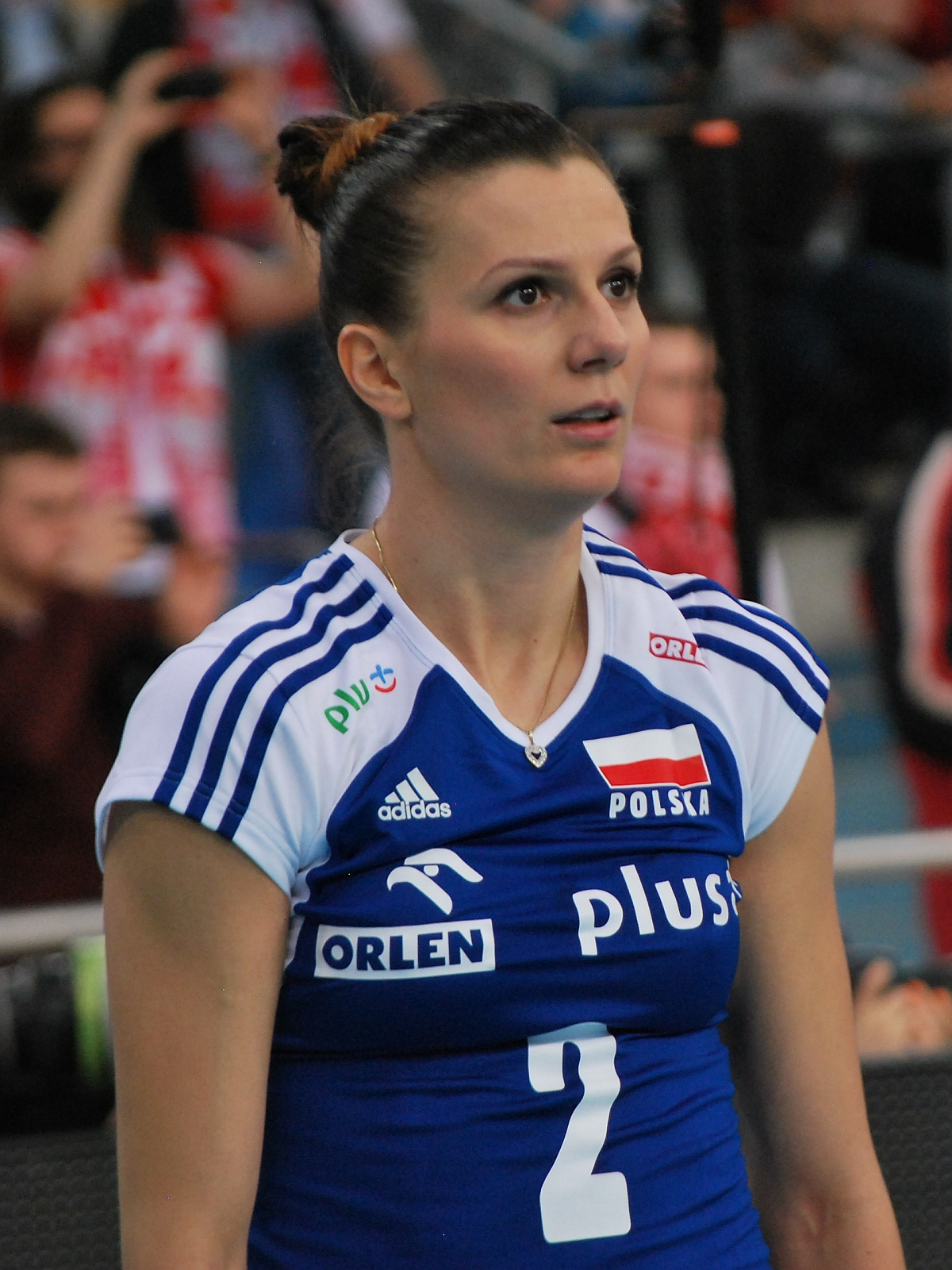

Personal information
- Full name: Mariola Katarzyna Zenik (nee Barbachowska)
- Nationality: Polish
- Born: 3 July 1982 (age 44); Węgrów, Poland
- Height: 1.73 m (5 ft 8 in)
- Weight: 64 kg (141 lb)
- Spike: 300 cm (120 in)
- Block: 295 cm (116 in)

Volleyball information
- Position: Libero
- Number: 2

Career
Years	Teams
2001–2003; 2003–2004; 2004–2005; 2005–2006; 2006–2007; 2007–2012; 2012–2014; 2014–2017	Nike Węgrów; Skra Warszawa; KPSK Stal Mielec; Volley Modena; Nafta-Gaz Piła; VC Zarechie Odintsovo; Muszynianka Muszyna; PGE Atom Trefl Sopot; KPS Chemik Police

National team
2001–	Poland
Honours
Representing Poland
Women's volleyball
European Championship
Gold medal – first place	2005 Croatia
Bronze medal – third place	2009 Poland
- Last updated: 11 August 2017

Mariola Katarzyna Zenik (née Barbachowska; born 3 July 1982) is a retired Polish volleyball player, a member of the Poland women's national volleyball team, a participant in the Olympic Games Beijing 2008, European Champion 2005, a bronze medalist of the European Championship 2009, and five-time Polish Champion (2008, 2009, 2011, 2013, 2015).

== Career ==
=== National team ===
In 2005 Zenik achieved the title of European Champion. In October 2009 with her teammates she won the bronze medal of European Championship 2009 after winning a match against Germany.

In August 2017 she took a break from her career because she was pregnant.

== Sporting achievements ==
=== Clubs ===
==== CEV Cup ====
- 2006/2007 - with VC Zarechie Odintsovo

==== National championships ====
- 2001/2002 Polish Championship, with Skra Warszawa
- 2003/2004 Polish Championship, with KPSK Stal Mielec
- 2005/2006 Polish Championship, with Nafta-Gaz Piła
- 2006/2007 Russian Cup, with VC Zarechie Odintsovo
- 2007/2008 Polish Championship, with MKS Muszynianka-Fakro Muszyna
- 2008/2009 Polish Championship, with MKS Muszynianka-Fakro Muszyna
- 2009/2010 Polish SuperCup 2009, with Bank BPS Muszynianka Fakro Muszyna
- 2009/2010 Polish Championship, with Bank BPS Muszynianka Fakro Muszyna
- 2010/2011 Polish Cup, with Bank BPS Muszynianka Fakro Muszyna
- 2010/2011 Polish Championship, with Bank BPS Muszynianka Fakro Muszyna
- 2011/2012 Polish SuperCup 2011, with Bank BPS Muszynianka Fakro Muszyna
- 2011/2012 Polish Championship, with Bank BPS Muszynianka Fakro Muszyna
- 2012/2013 Polish Championship, with PGE Atom Trefl Sopot
- 2013/2014 Polish Championship, with PGE Atom Trefl Sopot
- 2014/2015 Polish SuperCup 2014, with KPS Chemik Police
- 2014/2015 Polish Championship, with KPS Chemik Police

=== National team ===
- 1999 CEV U18 European Championship
- 2000 CEV U20 European Championship
- 2005 CEV European Championship
- 2009 CEV European Championship

=== Individually ===
- 1999 CEV U18 European Championship - Most Valuable Player
- 2006 Polish Cup - Best Receiver
- 2007 Montreux Volley Masters - Best Digger
- 2009 Polish Cup - Best Digger
- 2010 Polish Cup - Best Digger
- 2011 Polish Cup - Best Receiver

=== State awards ===
- 2005 Gold Cross of Merit
