= Magdalena Damaske =

Polish volleyball player (born 1996)

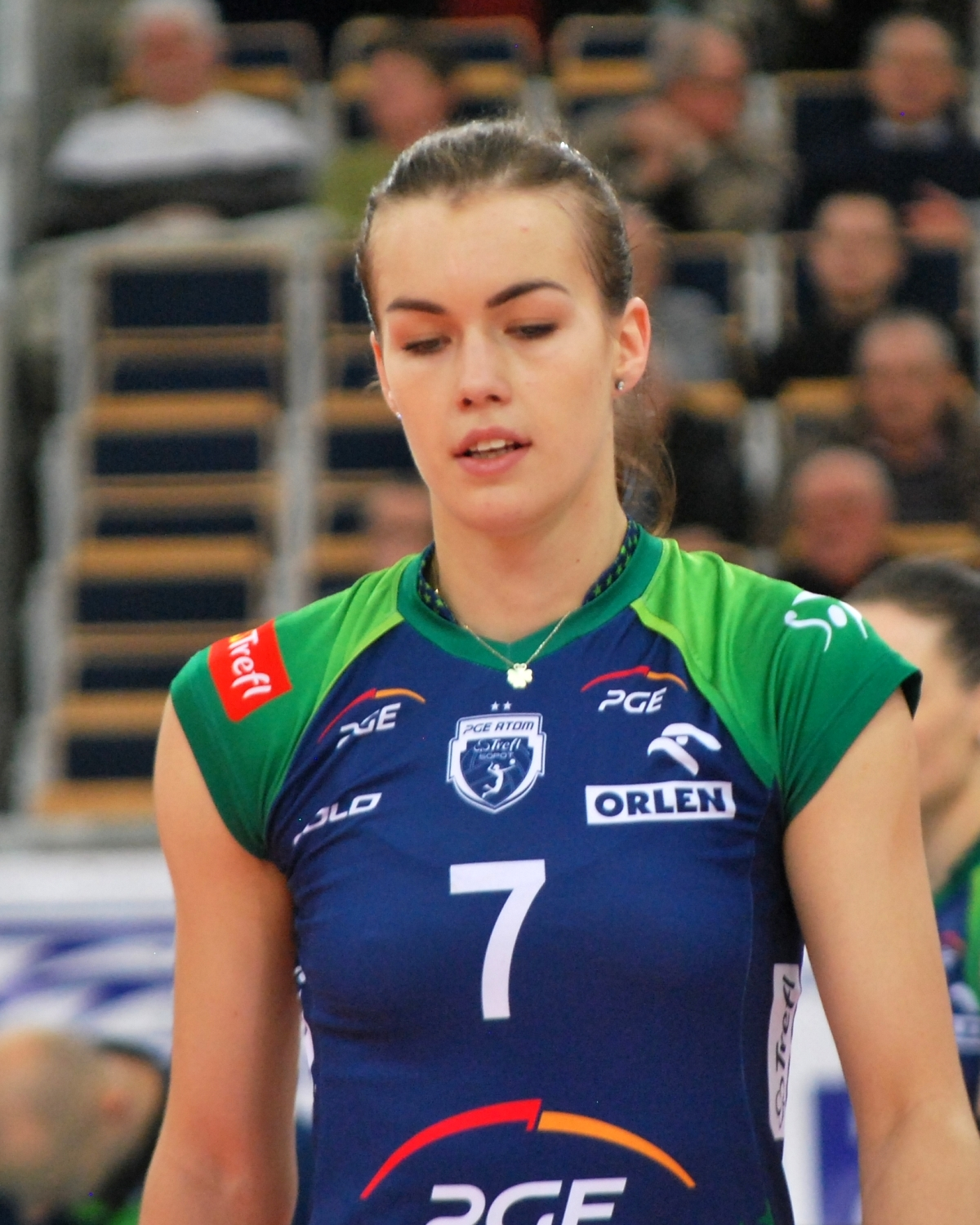
Damaske in 2016

Magdalena Damaske - Dawid (born 19 February 1996 in Rumia) is a Polish volleyball player. She plays for Atom Trefl Sopot in the Orlen Liga.

Damaske was part of the winning Polish team at the 2013 Girls' Youth European Volleyball Championship.
