= Izabela Bełcik =

Polish volleyball player

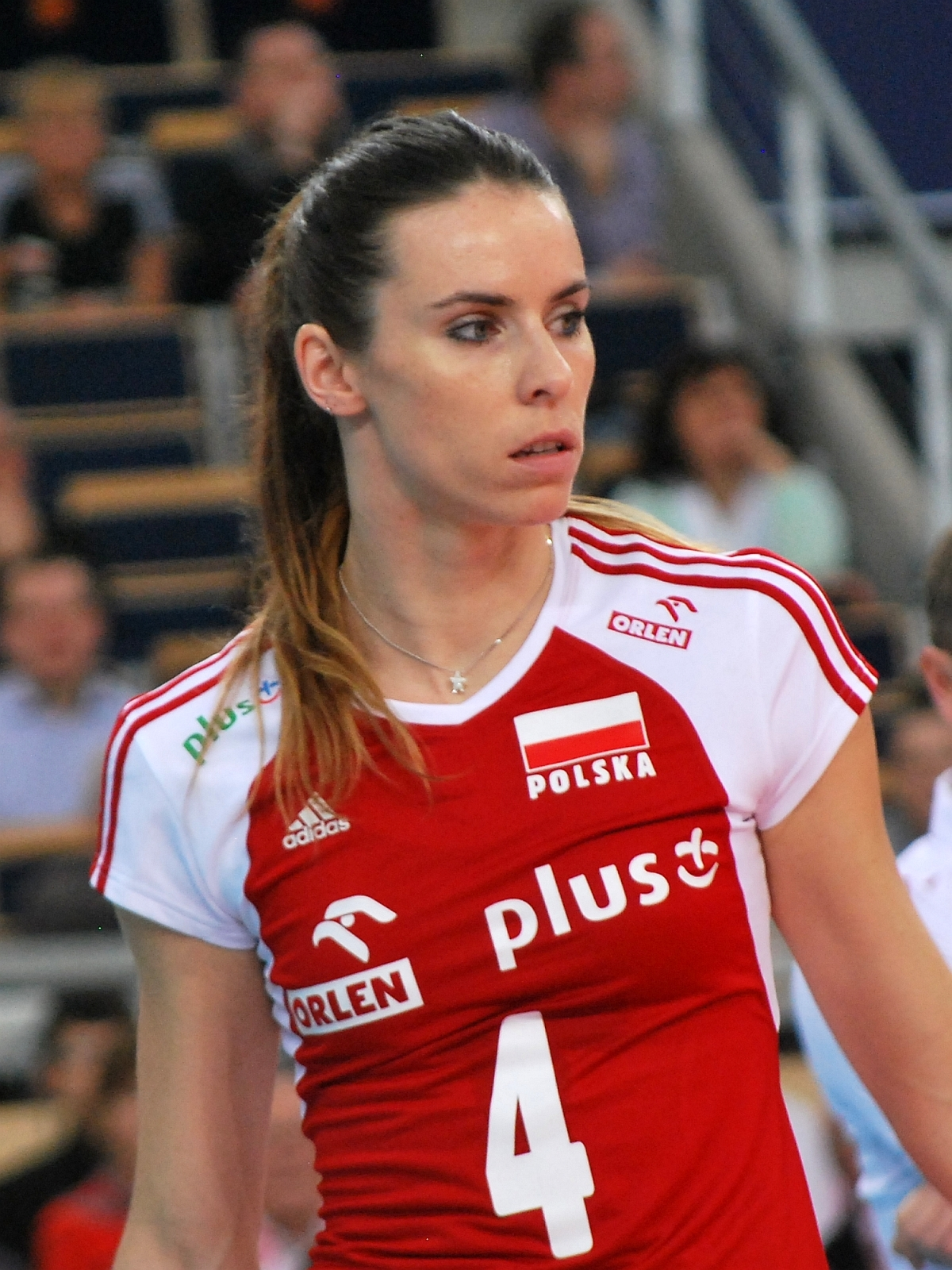

Personal information
- Full name: Izabela Bełcik
- Nationality: Polish
- Born: 29 November 1980 (age 45); Malbork, Poland
- Height: 1.85 m (6 ft 1 in)
- Weight: 65 kg (143 lb)
- Spike: 304 cm (120 in)
- Block: 292 cm (115 in)

Volleyball information
- Position: Setter
- Current club: (Poland) PGE Atom Trefl Sopot
- Number: 4

Career
Years	Teams
1997–1999; 1999–2004; 2004–2006; 2006–2010; 2010–	(Poland) Jurand Malbork (Poland) SMS PZPS Sosnowiec (Poland) Energa Gedania Gdańsk (Poland) PTPS Farmutil Piła (Poland) Muszynianka Muszyna (Poland) PGE Atom Trefl Sopot

National team
1999–	Poland
Honours
Representing Poland
Women's volleyball
European Championship
Gold medal – first place	2003 Turkey
Gold medal – first place	2005 Croatia
Bronze medal – third place	2009 Poland
European Games
Silver medal – second place	2015 Baku
- Last updated: 9 November 2015

Izabela Monika Bełcik (born 29 November 1980) is a Polish volleyball player, a member of Poland women's national volleyball team in 1999–2014, double European Champion (2003, 2005), bronze medalist of the European Championship 2009, four-time Polish Champion (2008, 2009, 2012, 2013).

== Career ==
=== Clubs ===
She went to PGE Atom Trefl Sopot in 2010. On 15 March 2015 she achieved with team from Sopot Polish Cup 2015.

=== National team ===
On 28 September 2003 Poland women's national volleyball team, including Bełcik, beat Turkey (3–0) in final and won title of European Champion 2003. Two years later, Polish team with Bełcik in squad defended title and achieved second title of European Champion. In October 2009 she won with teammates bronze medal of European Championship 2009 after winning match against Germany. She took part in 1st edition of European Games. In semi final her national team beat Serbia and qualified to final match. On 27 June 2015 Poland was beaten by Turkey and Bełcik with her teammates achieved silver medal.

== Sporting achievements ==
=== Clubs ===
==== CEV Cup ====
- 2014/2015 - with PGE Atom Trefl Sopot

==== National championships ====
- 2004/2005 Polish Championship, with Nafta-Gaz Piła
- 2005/2006 Polish Championship, with Nafta-Gaz Piła
- 2007/2008 Polish Championship, with MKS Muszynianka-Fakro Muszyna
- 2008/2009 Polish Championship, with MKS Muszynianka-Fakro Muszyna
- 2009/2010 Polish SuperCup 2009, with Bank BPS Muszynianka Fakro Muszyna
- 2009/2010 Polish Championship, with Bank BPS Muszynianka Fakro Muszyna
- 2010/2011 Polish Championship, with PGE Atom Trefl Sopot
- 2011/2012 Polish Championship, with PGE Atom Trefl Sopot
- 2012/2013 Polish Championship, with PGE Atom Trefl Sopot
- 2013/2014 Polish Championship, with PGE Atom Trefl Sopot
- 2014/2015 Polish Cup, with PGE Atom Trefl Sopot

=== National team ===
- 1997 CEV U18 European Championship
- 2003 CEV European Championship
- 2005 CEV European Championship
- 2009 CEV European Championship
- 2015 European Games

=== Individually ===
- 2013 Polish Cup - Best Server
- 2015 Polish Cup - Best Setter

=== State awards ===
- 2005 Gold Cross of Merit
