= Zuzanna Efimienko =

Polish volleyball player (born 1989)

Zuzanna Efimienko-Młotkowska
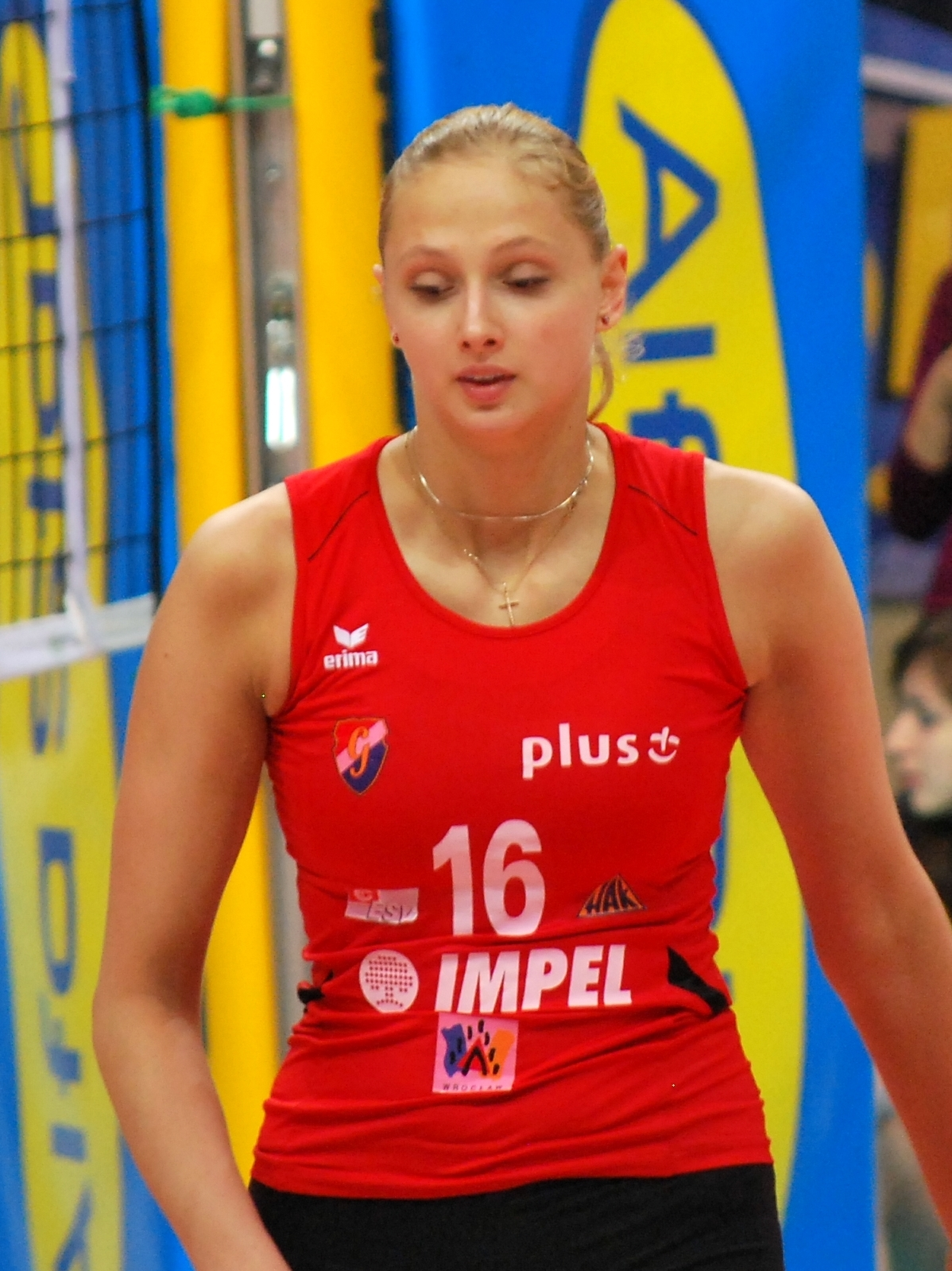

Personal information
- Nationality: Polish
- Born: 8 August 1989 (age 37) Lubań, Poland
- Height: 1.96 m (6 ft 5 in)
- Weight: 72 kg (159 lb)
- Spike: 318 cm (125 in)
- Block: 303 cm (119 in)

Volleyball information
- Position: middle blocker
- Number: 20

Career
- Years: Team
- 2010: (Poland) Atom Trefl Sopot

National team
- Years: Team
- 2010-present: Poland

Zuzanna Efimienko-Młotkowska (born 8 August 1989) is a Polish volleyball player. She was part of the Poland women's national volleyball team. She played with Impel Gwardia Wrocław.

== Clubs ==
- (Poland) SMS PZPS Sosnowiec (2003–2007)
- (Poland) Impel Gwardia Wrocław (2007–2012)
- (Italy) Imoco Volley (2012–2013)
- (Poland) Atom Trefl Sopot (2013–2016)
- (Italy) Metalleghe Sanitars Montichiari (2016–present)
