= Anastasia Chernaya =

Russian volleyball player (born 1987)

Personal information
- Nationality: Russian
- Born: 20 March 1987 (age 39)
- Height: 1.88 m (74 in)
- Weight: 77 kg (170 lb)
- Spike: 307 cm (121 in)
- Block: 296 cm (117 in)

Volleyball information
- Position: Opposite
- Number: 15 (national team)

Career
Years	Teams
2015	Avtodor-Metar

National team
2015	Russia

Anastasia Chernaya (born 1987) is a Russian volleyball player, playing as an opposite. She is part of the Russia women's national volleyball team.

She competed at the 2015 European Games in Baku. On club level she played for Avtodor-Metar in 2015. In 2012 she played for VC Leningradka.
