= Liana Badea =

Romanian volleyball player (born 1989)

Personal information
- Full name: Liana Gabriela Smărăndache Badea
- Nationality: Romanian
- Born: 9 August 1989 (age 37)
- Height: 1.86 m (73 in)
- Weight: 70 kg (154 lb)
- Spike: 315 cm (124 in)
- Block: 290 cm (114 in)

Volleyball information
- Position: Middle-blocker
- Number: 7 (national team)

Career
Years	Teams
2015	Dinamo București

National team
2015	Romania

Liana Gabriela Smărăndache Badea (born 9 August 1989) is a Romanian female volleyball player, playing as a middle-blocker. She is part of the Romania women's national volleyball team.

She competed at the 2015 European Games in Baku and at the 2015 Women's European Volleyball Championship. On club level she played for Dinamo București in 2015.
