= Charlotte Leys =

Belgian volleyball player

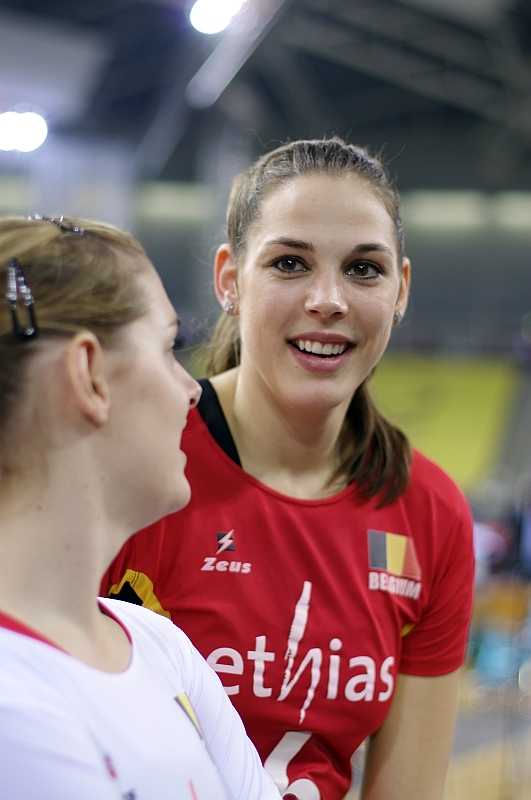

Personal information
- Nationality: Belgium
- Born: 18 March 1989 (age 37)
- Height: 1.84 m (6 ft 0 in)
- Weight: 78 kg (172 lb)
- Spike: 305 cm (120 in)
- Block: 293 cm (115 in)

Volleyball information
- Number: 6

Career
Years	Teams
2015	(Turkey) Galatasaray İstanbul
Honours
Women's volleyball
Representing Belgium
European Championships
Bronze medal – third place	2013 Germany	Team

Charlotte Leys (born 18 March 1989) is a Belgian female volleyball player. She was a member of the Belgium women's national volleyball team and played for Atom Trefl Sopot in 2014. Now she's a member of the Hermes Volley Oostende in the new season (2021–2022) She also was part of the Belgian national team at the 2014 FIVB Volleyball Women's World Championship in Italy, and 2015 FIVB World Grand Prix.

== Clubs ==
- (Belgium) Asterix Kieldrecht (2007–2010)
- (Poland) Pałac Bydgoszcz (2010–2011)
- (Poland) MKS Dąbrowa Górnicza (volleyball) (2011–2013)
- (Poland) Atom Trefl Sopot (2013–2015)
- (Turkey) Galatasaray İstanbul (2015–2017)
- (Turkey) Bursa Büyükşehir Belediyespor (2017–2021)
- (Belgium) Hermes Volley Oostende (2021–2022)
