= Agata Sawicka =

Polish volleyball player (born 1985)

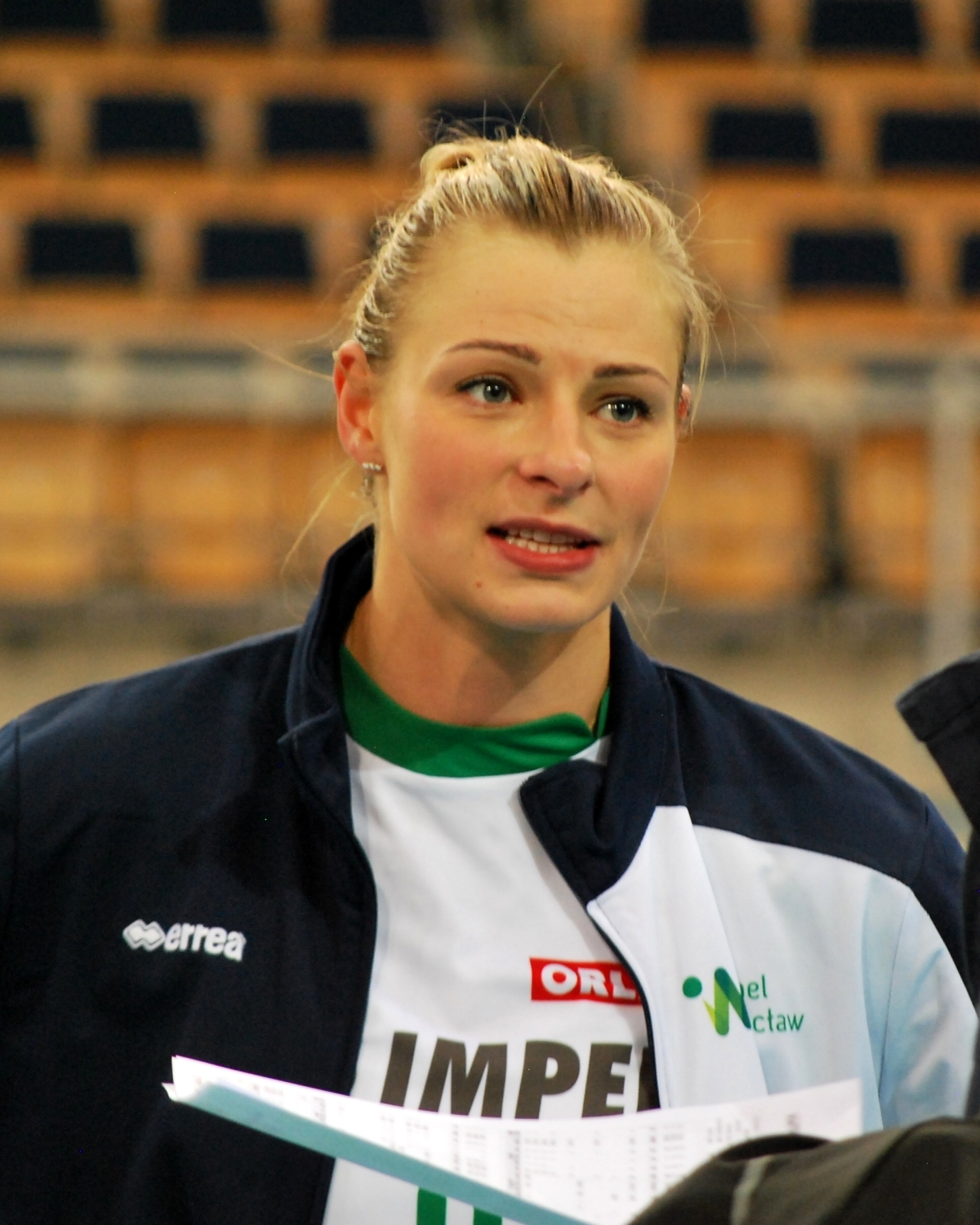

Personal information
- Nationality: Polish
- Born: 17 January 1985 (age 41); Łódź, Poland
- Height: 74 cm (29 in)
- Weight: 1.81 kg (4 lb)
- Spike: 295 cm (116 in)
- Block: 285 cm (112 in)

Volleyball information
- Position: Libero

Career
Teams
| | Impel Wrocław |

National team
| 2007 | Poland (35) |
Honours
Women's volleyball
Representing Poland
European Games
| Silver medal – second place | 2015 Baku |

Agata Sawicka (born 17 January 1985) is a Polish volleyball player, playing as a libero. She is part of the Poland women's national volleyball team.

She competed at the 2015 European Games in Baku. On club level she played for Impel Wrocław in 2015.
