= Maja Savić (volleyball) =

Serbian volleyball player (born 1993)

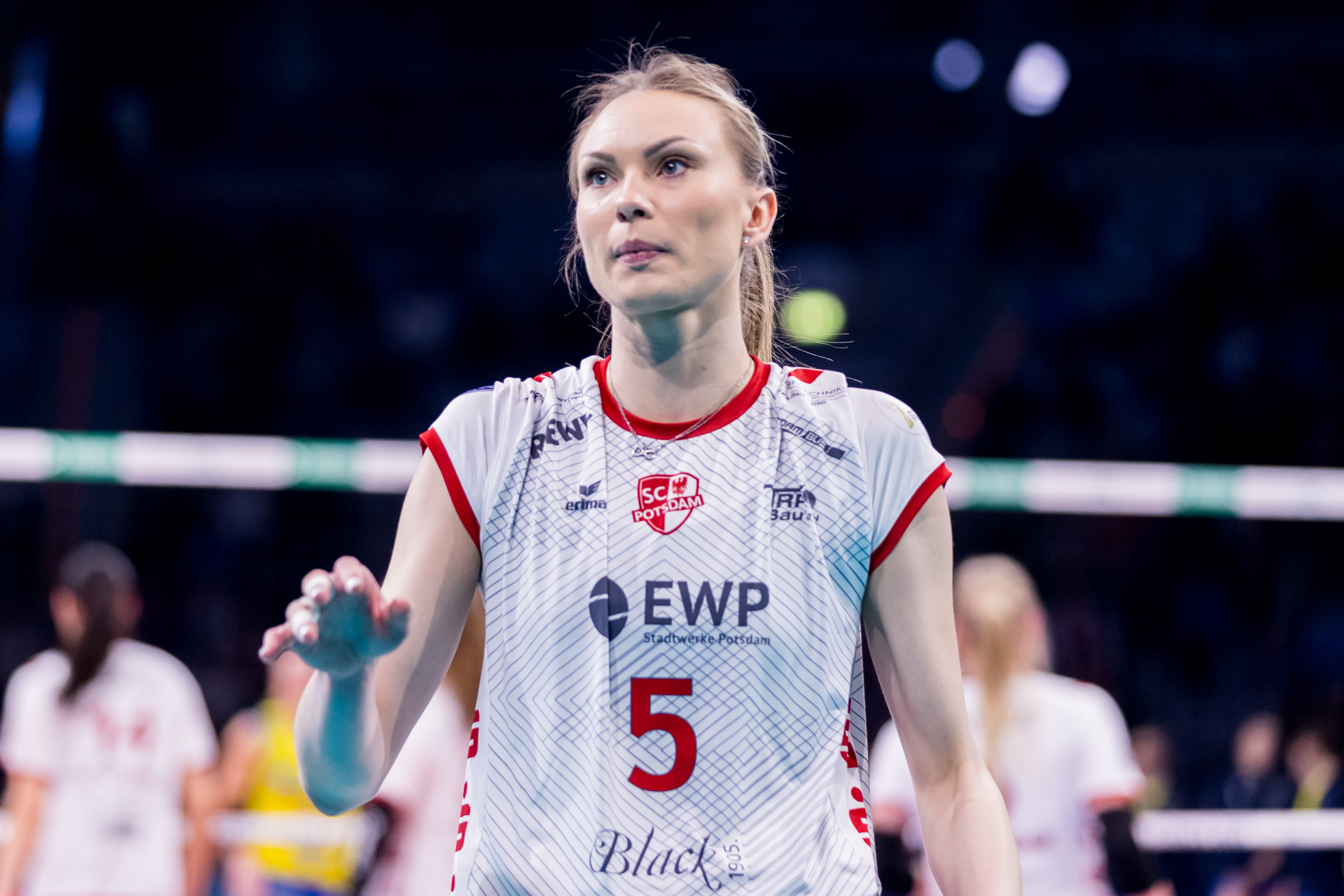

Personal information
- Nationality: Serbian
- Born: 14 August 1993 (age 33); Valjevo, Serbia, FR Yugoslavia
- Height: 1.89 m (74 in)
- Weight: 70 kg (154 lb)
- Spike: 305 cm (120 in)
- Block: 295 cm (116 in)

Volleyball information
- Position: Middle-blocker
- Current club: SC Potsdam
- Number: 1 (national team),5 (SC Potsdam)

Career
| Years | Teams |
|---|---|
| 2015 | Partizan Vizura |

National team
| 2015 | Serbia |
Honours
Women's volleyball
Representing Serbia
European Games
| Bronze medal – third place | 2015 Baku | Team |

Maja Savić (born 14 August 1993) is a Serbian volleyball player, playing as a middle-blocker. She is part of the Serbia women's national volleyball team. She won the bronze medal at the 2015 European Games in Baku. At club level she played for Vizura Belgrade in 2015. Since 2021 she is a part of the SC Potsdam 1. national league volleyball team.
