= Sylwia Pycia =

Polish volleyball player (born 1981)

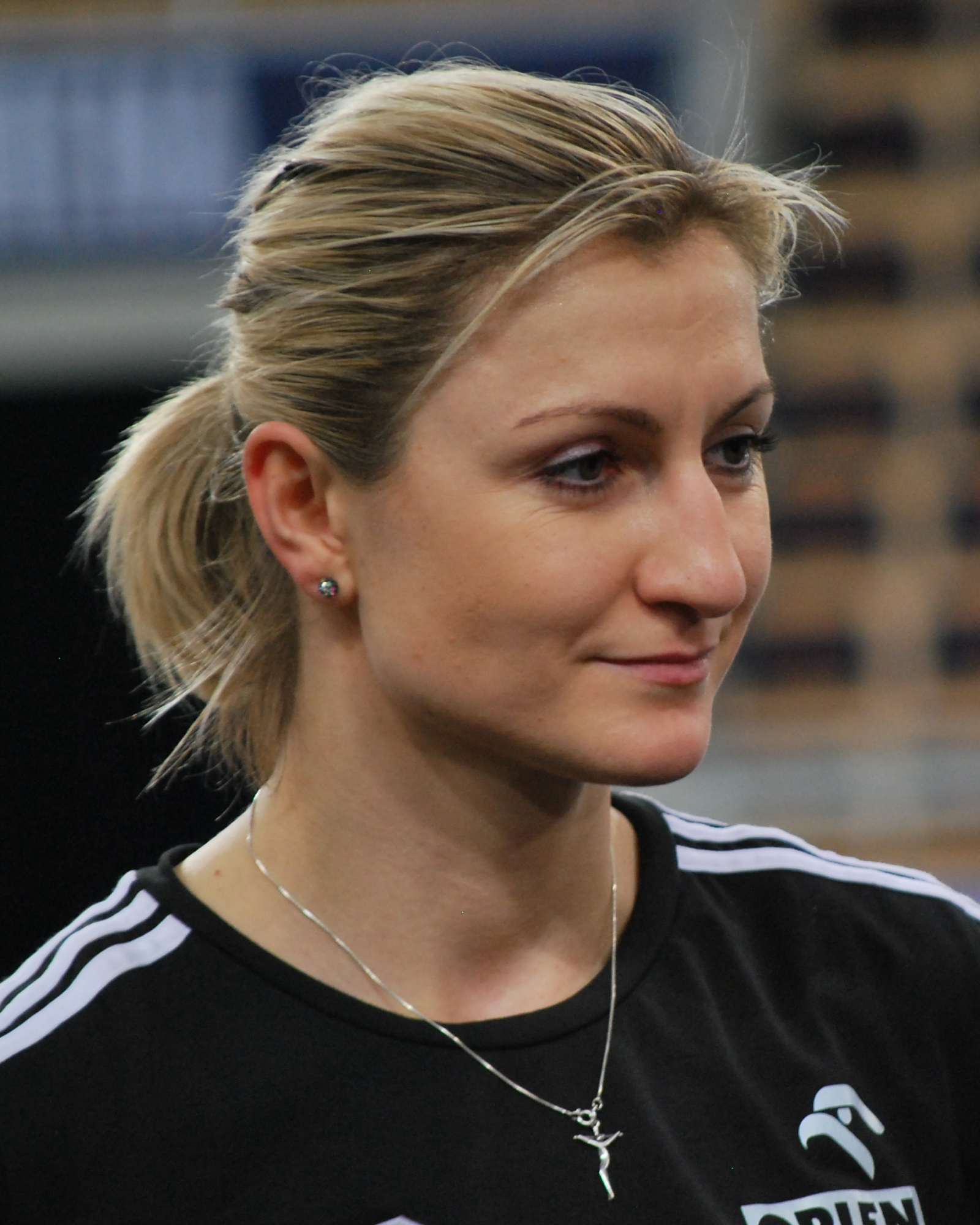

Personal information
- Full name: Sylwia Pycia
- Nationality: Polish
- Born: 20 April 1981 (age 45); Kraków, Poland
- Height: 1.89 m (6 ft 2 in)
- Weight: 78 kg (172 lb)
- Spike: 307 cm (121 in)
- Block: 302 cm (119 in)

Volleyball information
- Position: Middle blocker
- Current club: Budowlani Łódź
- Number: 11

Career
Years	Teams
1996–2000; 2000–2003; 2004–2006; 2006–2007; 2007–2010; 2010–2012; 2012–2017	MOSiR-MOSM Tychy; SMS PZPS Sosnowiec; Skra Warszawa; AZS AWF Poznań; AZS Białystok; Muszynianka Muszyna; KPSK Stal Mielec; Budowlani Łódź

National team
1998–2006; 2014–2017	Poland
Honours
Representing Poland
Women's volleyball
European Championship
Gold medal – first place	2005 Croatia
European Games
Silver medal – second place	2015 Baku
- Last updated: 19 April 2017

Sylwia Pycia (born 20 April 1981) is a Polish volleyball player, a member of Poland women's national volleyball team, European Champion 2005, silver medalist of European Games 2015, Polish Champion (2008, 2009).

== Career ==
In 2005, she achieved title of European Champion. She took part in 1st edition of European Games. In semi final her national team beat Serbia and qualified to final match. On 27 June 2015 Poland was beaten by Turkey and Pycia with her team mates winning a silver medal.

In April 2017 she decided to end her career.

== Sporting achievements ==
=== National team ===
- 2005 CEV European Championship
- 2015 European Games

=== State awards ===
- 2005 Gold Cross of Merit
