= Anna Miros =

Polish volleyball player (born 1985)

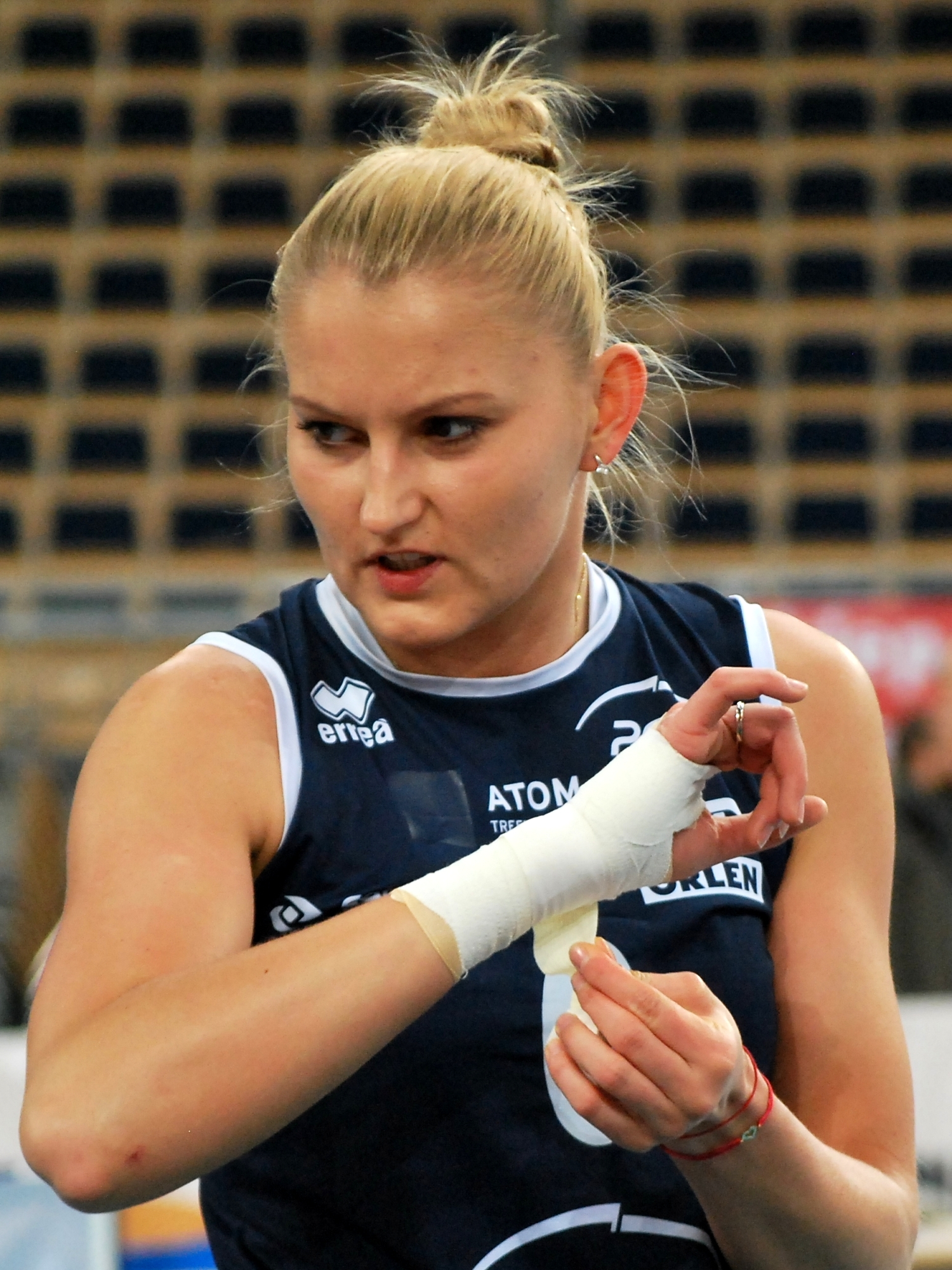

Personal information
- Full name: Anna Barbara Miros
- Nationality: Poland
- Born: Anna Barbara Podolec; 30 October 1985 (age 40); Łańcut, Poland
- Height: 1.93 m (6 ft 4 in)
- Weight: 80 kg (176 lb)
- Spike: 318 cm (125 in)
- Block: 305 cm (120 in)

Volleyball information
- Position: Opposite
- Current club: MKS Dąbrowa Górnicza
- Number: 7

Career
Years	Teams
	MKS Łańcut
–2003	SMS PZPS Sosnowiec
2003–2007	BKS Stal Bielsko-Biała
2007–2008	Proton Balakovo
2008–2010	Asystel Novara
2010–2011	BKS Stal Bielsko-Biała
2011–2012	CS Dinamo București
2012–2012	Avtodor-Metar
2012–2016	Atom Trefl Sopot
2016–	MKS Dąbrowa Górnicza

National team
2002–	Poland
Honours
Representing Poland
Women's volleyball
European Championship
Gold medal – first place	2003 Turkey
European Games
Silver medal – second place	2015 Baku
- Last updated: 12 December 2016

Anna Barbara Miros (née Podolec) (born 30 October 1985) is a Polish volleyball player. She plays for MKS Dąbrowa Górnicza in Poland and is also a member of Poland women's national volleyball team. She won the European Champion in 2003 with the latter.

== Career ==
In 2012, she moved to Atom Trefl Sopot. With Poland, she took part in the first edition of the European Games, beating Serbia in the tournament's semifinal and qualified to the final match. On 27 June 2015, Poland was beaten by Turkey in the final, becoming the tournament silver medalists.

== Clubs ==
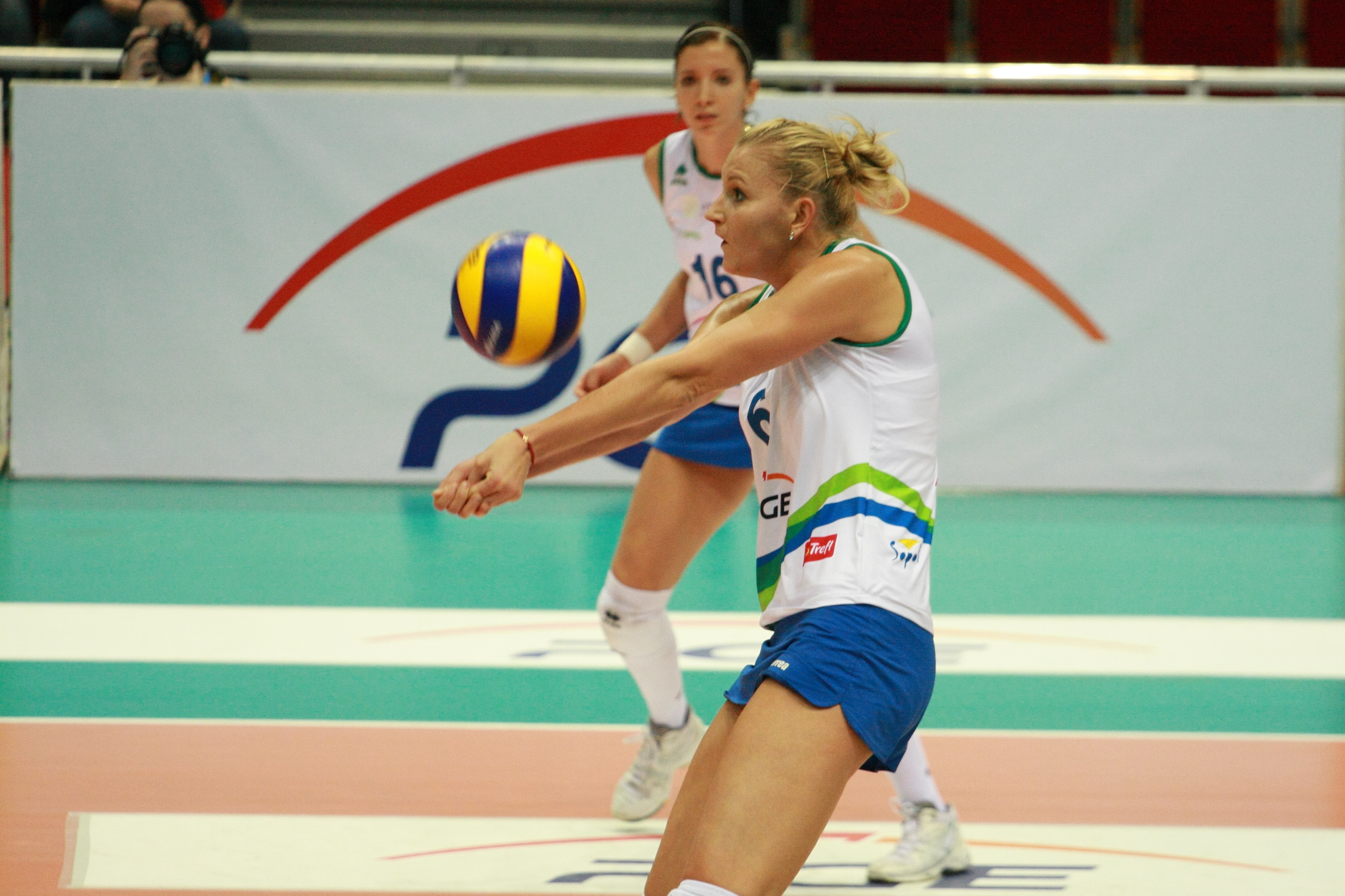
Podolec as a player of Atom Trefl Sopot in 2012

- (Poland) MKS Łańcut
- (Poland) SMS PZPS Sosnowiec
- (Poland) BKS Stal Bielsko-Biała (2003–2007)
- (Russia) Proton Balakovo (2007–2008)
- (Italy) Asystel Novara (2008–2010)
- (Poland) BKS Stal Bielsko-Biała (2010–2011)
- (Romania) CS Dinamo București (2011–2012)
- (Russia) Avtodor-Metar (2012–2012)
- (Poland) Atom Trefl Sopot (2012–2016)
- (Poland) MKS Dąbrowa Górnicza (2016–present)

== Sporting achievements ==
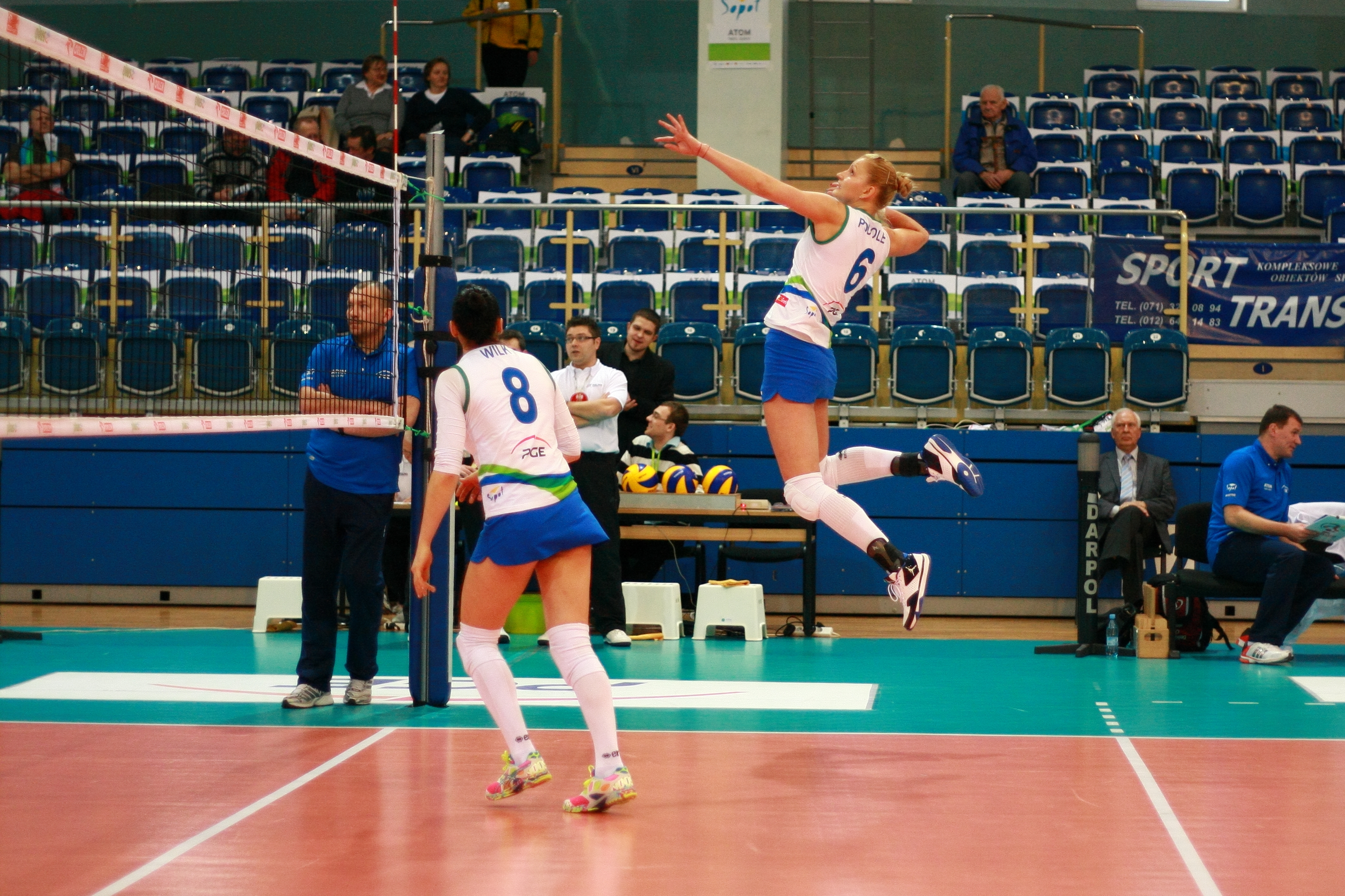
Podolec as a player of Atom Trefl Sopot in 2013

=== National team ===
- 2001 CEV U18 European Championship
- 2001 FIVB U18 World Championship
- 2002 CEV U20 European Championship
- 2003 FIVB U20 World Championship
- 2003 CEV European Championship
- 2015 European Games
