= Agata Witkowska =

Polish volleyball player (born 1989)

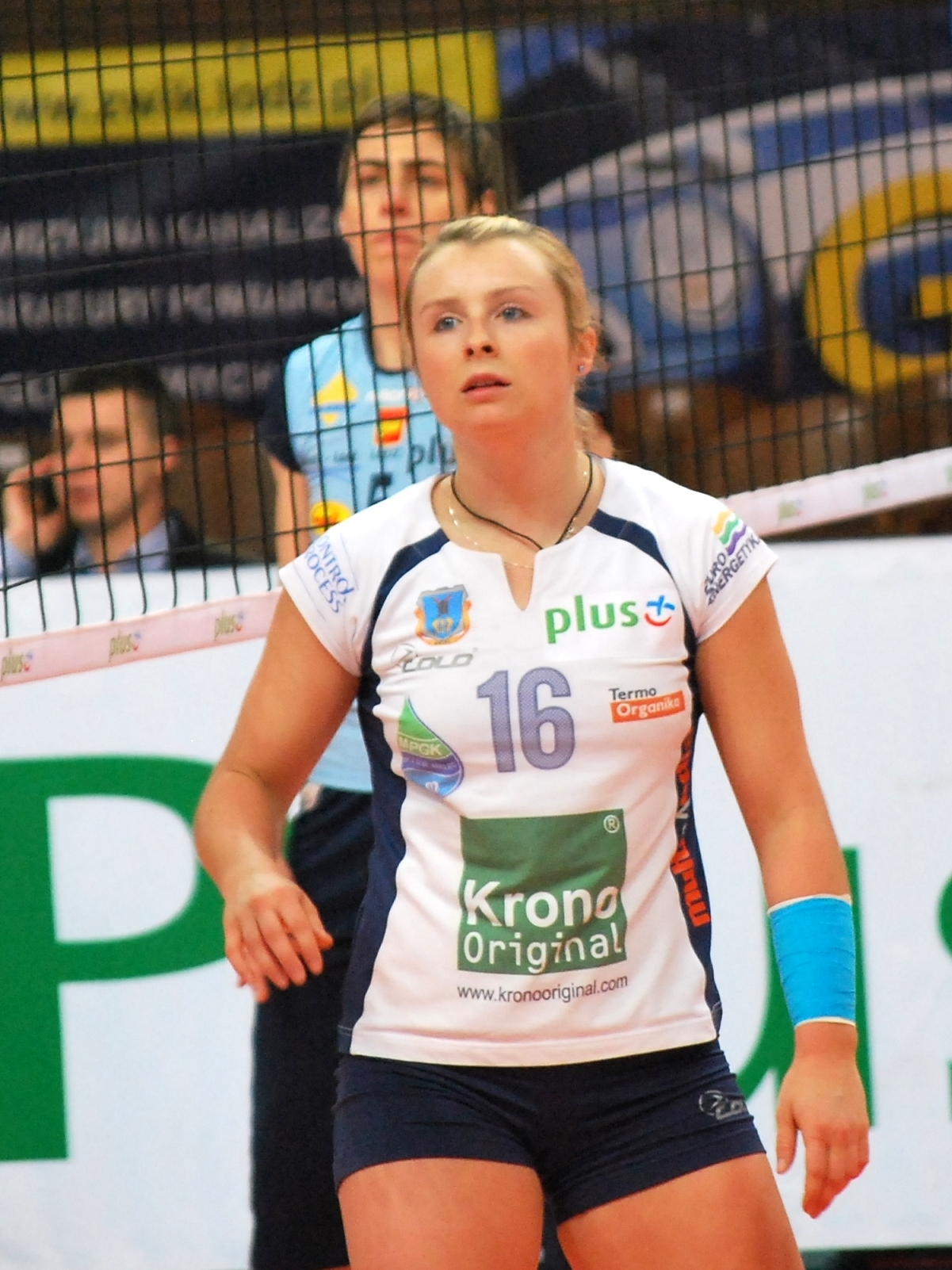

Personal information
- Full name: Agata Witkowska
- Nationality: Polish
- Born: 19 August 1989 (age 37); Gdańsk, Poland
- Height: 170 cm (67 in)
- Weight: 63 kg (139 lb)
- Spike: 280 cm (110 in)
- Block: 260 cm (102 in)

Volleyball information
- Position: Libero
- Current club: Unet Yamamay Busto Arsizio
- Number: 7

National team
2014–	Poland (20)
Honours
Women's volleyball
Representing Poland
European Games
Silver medal – second place	2015 Baku

Agata Witkowska (née Durajczyk; born 19 August 1989) is a Polish volleyball player, playing as a libero. She is part of the Poland women's national volleyball team.

She competed at the 2015 European Games, and 2015 Women's European Volleyball Championship. On club level she plays for Atom Trefl Sopot.
