= Volleyball at the 2015 European Games – Women's tournament =

2015 European Games
Tournament details
- Host country: Azerbaijan
- Dates: 13 June – 27 June
- Teams: 12
- Venue: 1 (in 1 host city)

Final positions
- Champions: Turkey (1st title)

The Women's tournament in volleyball at the 2015 European Games in Baku was the 1st edition of the event in a European Games. It was held at Baku Crystal Hall from 13 June to 27 June 2015.

== Qualification ==
Means of qualification	Vacancies	Qualified
Host nation	1	Azerbaijan
CEV European Ranking (as of 1 January 2015)	9	Russia; Serbia; Italy; Turkey; Germany; Netherlands; Poland; Belgium; Croatia
CEV European League Ranking List (2011–2014)	2	Bulgaria; Romania
Total	12	

== Pools composition ==
Teams were seeded following the Serpentine system according to their European ranking as of January 1, 2015.

Twelve qualified nations were drawn into two groups, each consisting of six teams. After a robin-round, the four highest-placed teams in each group advanced to a knock-out round to decide the medals.

Pool A	Pool B
Azerbaijan (Host)	Russia (1)
Italy (2)	Serbia (2)
Turkey (4)	Germany (5)
Poland (6)	Netherlands (6)
Belgium (8)	Croatia (8)
Romania (15)	Bulgaria (10)

== Pool standing procedure ==
1. Numbers of matches won
2. Match points
3. Sets ratio
4. Points ratio
5. Result of the last match between the tied teams

Match won 3–0 or 3–1: 3 match points for the winner, 0 match points for the loser
Match won 3–2: 2 match points for the winner, 1 match point for the loser

== Preliminary round ==
- All times are Azerbaijan Summer Time (UTC+05:00).

=== Pool A ===
Pos	Team	Pld	W	L	Pts	SW	SL	SR	SPW	SPL	SPR	Qualification
1	Turkey	5	4	1	13	14	3	4.667	403	319	1.263	Quarterfinals
2	Azerbaijan	5	4	1	11	12	7	1.714	453	409	1.108	Quarterfinals
3	Poland	5	3	2	9	11	8	1.375	425	403	1.055	Quarterfinals
4	Belgium	5	2	3	6	8	11	0.727	393	431	0.912	Quarterfinals
5	Romania	5	1	4	3	4	12	0.333	334	387	0.863	
6	Italy	5	1	4	3	4	12	0.333	325	384	0.846	

Date	Time		Score		Set 1	Set 2	Set 3	Set 4	Set 5	Total	Report
13 Jun	11:00	Italy	3–0	Belgium	25–22	25–20	25–20			75–62	Report
13 Jun	17:30	Azerbaijan	3–1	Romania	25–20	25–18	27–29	25–15		102–82	Report
13 Jun	22:00	Poland	3–2	Turkey	18–25	26–24	18–25	25–17	15–11	102–102	Report
15 Jun	11:00	Turkey	3–0	Italy	25–16	25–10	25–17			75–43	Report
15 Jun	16:30	Romania	0–3	Belgium	21–25	21–25	23–25			65–75	Report
15 Jun	22:00	Azerbaijan	3–0	Poland	28–26	25–16	25–23			78–65	Report
17 Jun	11:00	Poland	3–0	Romania	25–23	25–15	25–17			75–55	Report
17 Jun	16:30	Italy	1–3	Azerbaijan	22–25	20–25	25–22	22–25		89–97	Report
17 Jun	20:00	Belgium	0–3	Turkey	16–25	15–25	18–25			49–75	Report
19 Jun	09:00	Romania	0–3	Turkey	16–25	22–25	19–25			57–75	Report
19 Jun	16:30	Poland	3–0	Italy	25–17	25–18	25–23			75–58	Report
19 Jun	20:00	Azerbaijan	3–2	Belgium	25–21	22–25	25–20	21–25	15–6	108–97	Report
21 Jun	09:00	Belgium	3–2	Poland	25–22	21–25	23–25	25–22	16–14	110–108	Report
21 Jun	14:30	Italy	0–3	Romania	23–25	16–25	21–25			60–75	60–75
21 Jun	20:00	Turkey	3–0	Azerbaijan	25–23	26–24	25–21			76–68	Report

=== Pool B ===
Pos	Team	Pld	W	L	Pts	SW	SL	SR	SPW	SPL	SPR	Qualification
1	Serbia	5	4	1	13	14	4	3.500	426	359	1.187	Quarterfinals
2	Netherlands	5	4	1	11	12	7	1.714	432	405	1.067	Quarterfinals
3	Germany	5	3	2	9	12	8	1.500	428	434	0.986	Quarterfinals
4	Russia	5	2	3	5	7	11	0.636	392	406	0.966	Quarterfinals
5	Bulgaria	5	1	4	4	6	12	0.500	390	404	0.965	
6	Croatia	5	1	4	3	4	13	0.308	352	412	0.854	

Date	Time		Score		Set 1	Set 2	Set 3	Set 4	Set 5	Total	Report
13 Jun	09:00	Serbia	3–0	Croatia	25–15	25–17	25–17			75–49	Report
13 Jun	14:30	Germany	3–2	Bulgaria	25–22	24–26	10–25	28–26	15–10	102–109	Report
13 Jun	20:00	Netherlands	3–1	Russia	25–19	21–25	25–22	25–21		96–87	Report
15 Jun	09:00	Bulgaria	3–0	Russia	25–16	25–22	25–20			75–58	Report
15 Jun	14:30	Croatia	1–3	Netherlands	23–25	17–25	25–17	21–25		86–92	Report
15 Jun	20:00	Germany	1–3	Serbia	24–26	25–18	15–25	22–25		86–94	Report
17 Jun	09:00	Netherlands	0–3	Germany	13–25	23–25	22–25			58–75	Report
17 Jun	14:30	Serbia	3–0	Bulgaria	27–25	25–12	25–18			77–55	Report
17 Jun	22:00	Russia	3–0	Croatia	25–22	25–19	26–24			76–65	Report
19 Jun	11:00	Bulgaria	1–3	Croatia	23–25	23–25	25–15	23–25		94–90	Report
19 Jun	14:30	Serbia	2–3	Netherlands	25–20	22–25	28–26	16–25	9–15	100–111	Report
19 Jun	22:00	Germany	2–3	Russia	26–24	9–25	20–25	25–22	10–15	90–111	Report
21 Jun	11:00	Netherlands	3–0	Bulgaria	25–20	25–18	25–19			75–57	Report
21 Jun	16:30	Croatia	0–3	Germany	21–25	22–25	19–25			62–75	Report
21 Jun	22:00	Russia	0–3	Serbia	28–30	14–25	16–25			58–80	Report

== Final round ==
- All times are Azerbaijan Summer Time (UTC+05:00).

The teams who rank 1st in each pool played against the teams who rank 4th in the other pool. The 2nd place teams in pool A played against the 2nd or 3rd place teams in the pool B, determined by drawing of lots. The remaining teams played each other.

Quarterfinals
23 June
Turkey	3
Russia	1
23 June
Azerbaijan	3
Netherlands	0
23 June
Poland	3
Germany	2
23 June
Belgium	2
Serbia	3

Semifinals
25 June
Turkey	3
Azerbaijan	2
25 June
Poland	3
Serbia	2

Final
27 June
Turkey	3
Poland	0
3rd place
27 June
Azerbaijan	2
Serbia	3

=== Quarterfinals ===
Date	Time		Score		Set 1	Set 2	Set 3	Set 4	Set 5	Total	Report
23 Jun	13:00	Poland	3–2	Germany	25–23	25–17	18–25	14–25	15–10	97–100	Report
23 Jun	15:00	Turkey	3–1	Russia	25–18	23–25	25–22	25–19		98–84	Report
23 Jun	19:00	Azerbaijan	3–0	Netherlands	25–21	25–23	25–14			75–58	Report
23 Jun	21:00	Belgium	2–3	Serbia	22–25	25–19	14–25	25–21	17–19	103–109	Report

=== Semifinals ===
Date	Time		Score		Set 1	Set 2	Set 3	Set 4	Set 5	Total	Report
25 Jun	17:00	Poland	3–2	Serbia	25–23	20–25	25–19	22–25	15–12	107–104	Report
25 Jun	19:30	Turkey	3–2	Azerbaijan	25–21	23–25	25–19	23–25	15–11	111–101	Report

=== Third Place ===
Date	Time		Score		Set 1	Set 2	Set 3	Set 4	Set 5	Total	Report
27 Jun	16:00	Azerbaijan	2–3	Serbia	25–21	19–25	25–17	14–25	9–15	92–103	Report

=== Final ===
Date	Time		Score		Set 1	Set 2	Set 3	Set 4	Set 5	Total	Report
27 Jun	18:30	Turkey	3–0	Poland	25–11	25–19	25–13			75–43	Report

== Final standings ==
Rank	Team
1st place, gold medalist(s)	Turkey
2nd place, silver medalist(s)	Poland
3rd place, bronze medalist(s)	Serbia
4	Azerbaijan
5	Belgium
5	Germany
5	Netherlands
5	Russia
9	Bulgaria
9	Romania
11	Croatia
11	Italy

2015 Women's European Games champions

Turkey
1st title

== Medalists ==
Gold	Silver	Bronze
Turkey (TUR) Çağla Akın; Kübra Akman; Seda Aslanyürek; Naz Aydemir; Dicle Nur Babat; Büşra Cansu; Merve Dalbeler; Meliha İsmailoğlu; Aslı Kalaç; Gizem Güreşen Karadayı; Güldeniz Önal Paşalıoğlu (C); Neriman Özsoy; Polen Uslupehlivan; Gözde Yılmaz	Poland (POL) Anna Werblińska; Maja Tokarska; Izabela Bełcik (captain); Agnieszka Kąkolewska; Agnieszka Bednarek-Kasza; Anna Miros; Katarzyna Zaroślińska; Agata Sawicka; Daria Paszek; Sylwia Pycia; Agata Durajczyk; Joanna Wołosz; Natalia Kurnikowska; Katarzyna Skowrońska-Dolata	Serbia (SRB) Maja Savić; Marta Drpa; Bojana Živković; Mina Popović; Tijana Malešević; Brižitka Molnar; Brankica Mihajlović; Jelena Nikolić (captain); Ana Bjelica; Jovana Stevanović; Milena Rašić; Silvija Popović; Sladana Mirković; Bianka Busa

== See also ==
- Volleyball at the 2015 European Games – Men's tournament
