= Kübra Akman =

Turkish volleyball player (born 1994)

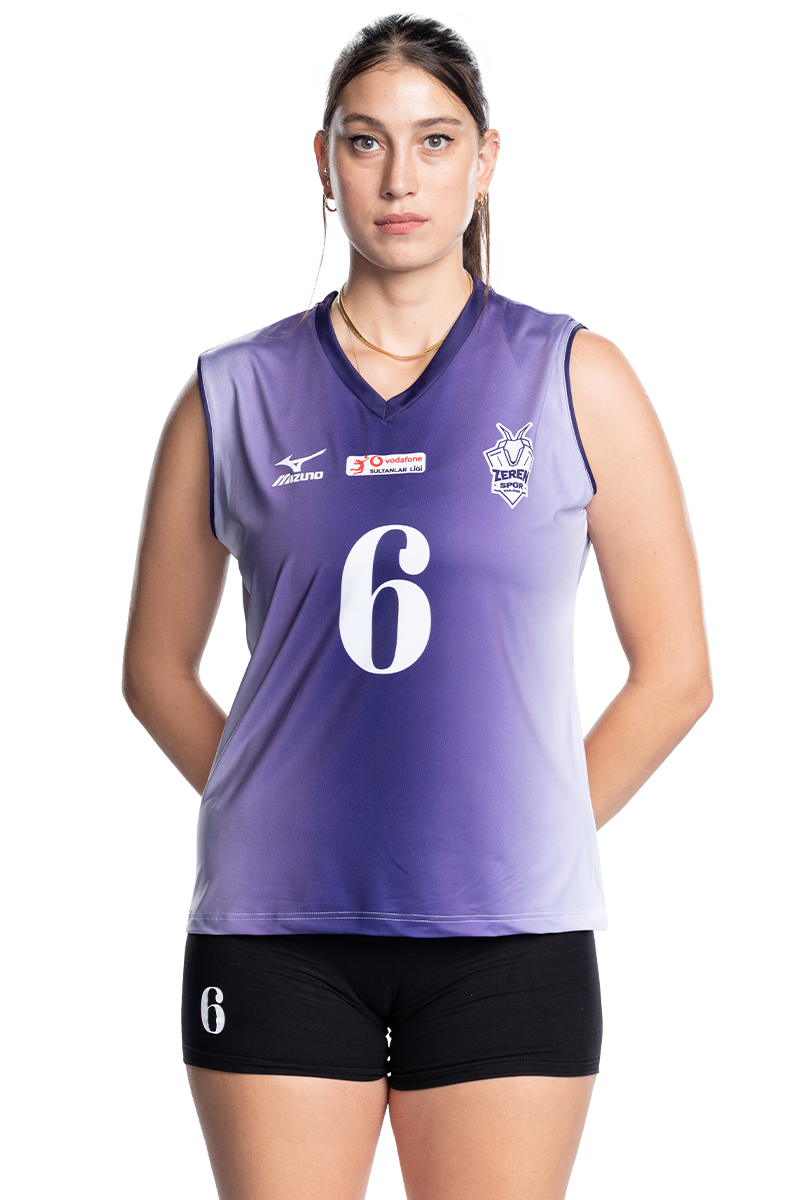
- Akman in 2024

Personal information
- Full name: Kübra Akman
- Nationality: Turkish
- Born: 13 October 1994 (age 32); İznik, Turkey
- Height: 200 cm (6 ft 7 in)
- Weight: 88 kg (194 lb)
- Spike: 320 cm (126 in)
- Block: 310 cm (122 in)

Volleyball information
- Position: Middle blocker
- Current club: Fenerbahçe
- Number: 6

Career
Years
- 2008–2013
- 2013–2023
- 2023–2024
- 2024–2026
- 2026-
Teams
- Nilüfer Belediyespor
- VakıfBank Türk Telekom
- Türk Hava Yolları
- Zeren SK
- Fenerbaçhe S.K

National team
- 2011
- 2012
- 2013–2023
- Turkey U19
- Turkey U20
- Turkey
Honours
Women's volleyball
Representing Turkey
European Championship
Bronze medal – third place	2017 Azerbaijan/Georgia	Team
Silver medal – second place	2019 Turkey	Team
Gold medal – first place	2023 Belgium/Italy/Estonia/Germany	Team
European Games
Gold medal – first place	2015 Baku	Team
Montreux Volley Masters
Gold medal – first place	2015 Montreux	Team
U23 World Championship
Silver medal – second place	2015 Ankara
Women's European Volleyball League
Gold medal – first place	2014 Germany/Turkey	Team
Junior European Championship
Gold medal – first place	2012 Ankara
Youth World Championship
Gold medal – first place	2011 Ankara
European Youth Olympic Festival
Bronze medal – third place	2011 Trabzon	Team
FIVB Nations League
Bronze medal – third place	2021 Rimini	Team

Kübra Akman (born 13 October 1994), also known as Kübra Çalışkan, is a Turkish professional volleyball player of Fenerbahçe.

== Career ==
She played for Nilüfer Belediyespor before she transferred in 2012 to VakıfBank Türk Telekom. Akman was a member of the Turkey U19 and Turkey U20 national teams. She wore number 3.

Akman won the gold medal at the 2013 Club World Championship playing with Vakıfbank Istanbul. Three years later she won the bronze medal at the 2016 Club World Championship with the same club.

== Awards ==
=== National team ===
- 2011 FIVB Girls Youth World Championship - Gold
- 2011 European Youth Summer Olympic Festival - Bronze
- 2012 Women's Junior European Volleyball Championship - Gold
- 2014 Women's European Volleyball League - Gold
- 2015 FIVB Volleyball Women's U23 World Championship - Silver
- 2015 European Games - (gold) champion
- 2017 European Championship - Bronze Medal
- 2019 European Championship - Silver Medal
- 2021 Nations League - Bronze Medal
- 2023 Nations League - Gold Medal
- 2023 European Championship – Gold Medal

=== Clubs ===
- 2013 Club World Championship - Gold, with Vakıfbank Istanbul
- 2016 Club World Championship - Bronze, with Vakıfbank Istanbul
- 2016–17 CEV Champions League - Gold, with VakıfBank Istanbul
- 2017 FIVB Women's Club World Championship - Gold, with VakıfBank Istanbul
- 2017–18 Turkish League - Gold, with VakıfBank Istanbul
- 2017–18 CEV Champions League - Gold, with VakıfBank Istanbul
- 2019 FIVB Club World Championship – Bronze medal, with VakıfBank
- 2020 Turkish Super Cup - Runner-Up, with VakıfBank S.K.
- 2021–22 Turkish League - Gold, with VakıfBank Istanbul
- 2021–22 CEV Champions League - Gold, with VakıfBank Istanbul

=== Individuals ===
- 2014 Women's European Volleyball League Most Valuable Player
- 2015 FIVB Volleyball Women's U23 World Championship Best Middle Blocker
- 2017 FIVB Women's Club World Championship 2nd Best Middle Blocker

== See also ==
- Turkish women in sports
