= Atom Trefl Sopot =

Polish women's volleyball club

- 2016–17
- Full name: Atom Trefl Sopot Spółka Akcyjna
- Nickname: Atomówki
- Founded: 2008
- Ground: Ergo Arena; Gdańsk/Sopot, Poland (Capacity: 11,200)
- Owner: Kazimierz Wierzbicki
- Chairman: Marek Wierzbicki
- Head coach: Piotr Matela
- League: Orlen Liga
- 2016–17: 9th
- Website: Club home page

Uniforms
Home	Away

Atom Trefl Sopot was a Polish women's volleyball club based in Sopot and playing in the Orlen Liga.

== Previous names ==
Due to sponsorship, the club have competed under the following names:

- Trefl Gdynia (2008–2009)
- Trefl Sopot (2009–2010)
- Atom Trefl Sopot (2010–2014)
- PGE Atom Trefl Sopot (2014–2016)
- Atom Trefl Sopot (2016–2017)

== History ==
The club was founded in 2008 as Trefl Gdynia and since its creation is a project designed to focus on professional sport at the highest league. The club reached the top Polish league after two seasons, in 2010 and achieved league success shortly after, winning the Championship in 2011–12 and 2012–13. The club proved to be very competitive at the highest national level as on its first six seasons (from 2010 until 2016), apart from the two titles mentioned earlier, it finished the league no lower than third placed. In the same period, it has also reached the Polish Cup finals on four occasions (winning in 2014–15) and was involved in three Polish Super Cups. In international competitions the club has yet to win a title, it has been often featuring in European competitions with a second place at the 2014–15 CEV Cup as its best result. In 2017 club replaced by Proxima Kraków and changed name on Trefl Proxima Kraków. This new club had promoted from I liga.

== Honours ==
=== National competitions ===
- Polish Championship: 2

2011–12, 2012–13

- Polish Cup: 1

2014–15

== Team ==
Season 2016–2017, as of February 2017.

Number	Player	Position	Height (m)	Weight (kg)	Birth date
1	(Poland) Joanna Grzmocińska	Outside hitter	1.78	77	23 April 1998 (age 28)
2	(Poland) Beata Mielczarek	Outside hitter	1.78	60	12 March 1991 (age 35)
3	(Poland) Martyna Łukasik	Opposite	1.89	62	26 November 1999 (age 26)
4	(Poland) Karolina Bednarek	Middle blocker	1.90	75	31 October 1988 (age 37)
5	(Poland) Daria Szczyrba	Outside hitter	1.80	67	2 December 1998 (age 27)
6	(Poland) Małgorzata Skorupa	Middle blocker	1.81	69	16 September 1984 (age 41)
7	(Poland) Magdalena Damaske	Outside hitter	1.85	69	19 February 1996 (age 30)
8	(Belgium) Karolina Goliat	Opposite	1.90	76	25 October 1996 (age 29)
9	(Poland) Alicja Wójcik	Middle blocker	1.86	78	10 November 1994 (age 31)
10	(Poland) Dominika Mras	Setter	1.81	70	19 April 1996 (age 30)
11	(Poland) Justyna Łukasik	Middle blocker	1.89	75	27 January 1993 (age 33)
13	(Poland) Natalia Gajewska	Setter	1.78	65	24 May 1994 (age 32)
14	(Poland) Monika Fedusio	Outside hitter	1.83	76	6 November 1999 (age 26)
16	(Poland) Klaudia Kulig	Libero	1.73	61	1 May 1997 (age 29)
17	(Poland) Anna Bodasińska	Libero	1.68	61	15 June 1998 (age 28)

Season 2015–2016
Number	Player	Position	Height (m)	Birth date
1	(Poland) Maja Tokarska	Middle Blocker	1.93	22/02/1991
2	(Netherlands) Maret Balkestein-Grothues	Outside spiker	1.80	16/09/1988
3	(Poland) Daria Szczyrba	Outside spiker	1.80	02/12/1998
5	(Ukraine) Olga Savenchuk	Outside spiker	1.88	20/05/1988
6	(Poland) Anna Miros	Opposite	1.96	30/10/1985
7	(Poland) Magdalena Damaske	Outside spiker	1.85	19/02/1996
8	(Poland) Zuzanna Efimienko	Middle Blocker	1.96	08/08/1989
9	(Serbia) Danica Radenković	Setter	1.85	09/10/1992
10	(Poland) Anna Kaczmar	Setter	1.81	26/09/1985
11	(Poland) Justyna Łukasik	Middle Blocker	1.88	27/01/1993
13	(Poland) Agata Durajczyk	Libero	1.70	19/08/1989
14	(Poland) Klaudia Kulig	Libero	1.73	01/05/1997
15	(United States) Brittnee Cooper	Middle Blocker	1.88	26/02/1988
16	(Poland) Klaudia Kaczorowska	Outside spiker	1.83	20/12/1988
17	(Poland) Martyna Łukasik	Opposite	1.85	26/11/1999
18	(Poland) Katarzyna Zaroślińska	Opposite	1.87	03/02/1987
19	(Poland) Dominika Mras	Setter	1.81	19/04/1996

Season 2013–2014
Number	Player	Position	Height (m)
1.	(Poland) Natalia Gajewska	Setter	1.74
2.	(Poland) Mariola Zenik	Libero	1.75
3.	(Belgium) Charlotte Leys	Wing-spiker	1.84
4.	(Poland) Izabela Bełcik	Setter	1.85
5.	(Netherlands) Judith Pietersen	Opposite	1.88
6.	(Poland) Anna Podolec	Opposite	1.93
7.	(Poland) / (Ukraine) Julia Shelukhina	Middle Blocker	1.92
8.	(Poland) Zuzanna Efimierenko	Middle Blocker	1.97
9.	(United States) Kimberly Hill	Wing-spiker	1.93
10.	(Serbia) Brizitka Molnar	Wing-spiker	1.82
11.	(Poland) Justyna Łukasik	Middle Blocker	1.87
12.	(Poland) Magdalena Kuziak	Libero	1.61
13.	(Serbia) Bojana Radulović	Setter	1.84
16.	(Poland) Klaudia Kaczorowska	Wing-spiker	1.83

Season 2010–2011
Number	Player	Position	Height (cm)
1.	(Poland) Maja Tokarska	Middle Blocker	1.94
2.	(Poland) Katarzyna Konieczna	Opposite	1.84
3.	(Poland) Dorota Świeniewicz	Wing Spiker	1.80
4.	(Poland) Izabela Bełcik	Setter	1.85
6.	(Poland) Eleonora Dziękiewicz	Middle Blocker	1.85
7.	(Spain) Amaranta Fernández	Middle Blocker	1.88
8.	(United States) Alisha Glass	Setter	1.84
9.	(Germany) Corina Ssuschke-Voigt	Middle Blocker	1.89
10.	(Poland) Magdalena Saad	Libero	1.68
11.	(United States) Megan Hodge	Wing Spiker	1.91
12.	(Turkey) Neriman Özsoy	Wing Spiker	1.88
13.	(Poland) Paulina Maj	Libero	1.66
14.	(Poland) Ewelina Sieczka	Wing Spiker	1.82
15.	(Germany) / (Poland) Margareta Kozuch	Opposite	1.88

== Notable players ==
- (Poland) Izabela Bełcik
- (Poland) Eleonora Dziękiewicz
- (Poland) Zuzanna Efimienko
- (Poland) Klaudia Kaczorowska
- (Poland) Paulina Maj
- (Poland) Anna Podolec
- (Poland) Dorota Pykosz
- (Poland) Magdalena Śliwa
- (Poland) Dorota Świeniewicz
- (Poland) Maja Tokarska
- (Poland) Martyna Łukasik (Poland) Sylwia Wojcieska
- (Poland) Mariola Zenik
- (Australia) Rachel Rourke
- (Belgium) Charlotte Leys
- (Brazil) Érika Coimbra
- (Cuba) Noris Cabrera
- (France) / (Poland) Kinga Maculewicz
- (Germany) / (Poland) Margareta Kozuch
- (Germany) Corina Ssuschke-Voigt
- (Italy) Simona Rinieri
- (Netherlands) Judith Pietersen
- (Russia) Olga Fateeva
- (Spain) Amaranta Fernández
- (Ukraine) / (Poland) Yulia Shelukhina
- (United States) Alisha Glass
- (United States) Megan Hodge
- (Turkey) Meryem Boz
- (Turkey) Neriman Özsoy
- (United States) Kimberly Hill
