= 2014 Women's European Volleyball League =

European volleyball tournament

- Dates: 6 June–19 July
- Teams: 8

Final positions
- Champions: Turkey (1st title)

Tournament awards
- MVP: (Turkey) Kübra Akman

The 2014 Women's European Volleyball League was the sixth edition of the annual Women's European Volleyball League, which featured women's national volleyball teams from eight European countries.

Turkey defeated Germany 6–2 in the final, which was played over two legs, to capture their first title.

== Format ==
This year saw no final four tournament. Instead the eight teams were split into two pools and played a round robin with playing three matchups at home and away, making a total of twelve games for each team. The top placed team of each group advanced to the final.

== Teams ==
- Azerbaijan
- Bulgaria
- Germany
- Greece
- Poland
- Slovenia
- Spain
- Turkey

== League round ==
=== Pool A ===
Pos	Team	Pld	W	L	Pts	SW	SL	SR	SPW	SPL	SPR	Qualification
1	Turkey	12	9	3	27	29	12	2.417	949	848	1.119	Final
2	Azerbaijan	12	5	7	16	21	25	0.840	951	987	0.964	
3	Bulgaria	12	4	8	15	20	27	0.741	1002	1020	0.982	
4	Slovenia	12	6	6	14	21	27	0.778	1011	1058	0.956	

==== Leg 1 ====
Date	Time		Score		Set 1	Set 2	Set 3	Set 4	Set 5	Total	Report
6 Jun	17:30	Bulgaria	3–0	Azerbaijan	25–15	25–23	25–17			75–55	Report
7 Jun	17:30	Bulgaria	3–1	Azerbaijan	19–25	25–19	25–17	25–13		94–74	Report
7 Jun	18:00	Turkey	3–0	Slovenia	25–19	25–13	25–20			75–52	Report
8 Jun	18:00	Turkey	0–3	Slovenia	20–25	11–25	21–25			52–75	Report

==== Leg 2 ====
Date	Time		Score		Set 1	Set 2	Set 3	Set 4	Set 5	Total	Report
14 Jun	17:00	Bulgaria	3–1	Turkey	16–25	25–12	25–16	25–23		91–76	Report
14 Jun	19:00	Azerbaijan	2–3	Slovenia	25–14	25–16	9–25	18–25	8–15	85–95	Report
15 Jun	17:00	Bulgaria	1–3	Turkey	25–19	13–25	18–25	16–25		72–94	Report
15 Jun	19:00	Azerbaijan	3–0	Slovenia	25–18	25–19	25–11			75–48	Report

==== Leg 3 ====
Date	Time		Score		Set 1	Set 2	Set 3	Set 4	Set 5	Total	Report
19 Jun	18:00	Slovenia	3–2	Bulgaria	25–21	25–23	24–26	18–25	15–12	107–107	Report
20 Jun	15:00	Slovenia	3–2	Bulgaria	25–21	20–25	18–25	25–21	15–10	103–102	Report
21 Jun	18:00	Turkey	3–0	Azerbaijan	25–11	25–14	25–18			75–43	Report
22 Jun	18:00	Turkey	3–1	Azerbaijan	25–27	26–24	25–22	25–14		101–87	Report

==== Leg 4 ====
Date	Time		Score		Set 1	Set 2	Set 3	Set 4	Set 5	Total	Report
27 Jun	18:00	Azerbaijan	3–1	Turkey	25–16	19–25	25–16	25–15		94–72	Report
28 Jun	18:00	Bulgaria	3–1	Slovenia	25–21	19–25	25–21	25–18		94–85	Report
28 Jun	18:00	Azerbaijan	0–3	Turkey	25–27	16–25	11–25			52–77	Report
29 Jun	18:00	Bulgaria	1–3	Slovenia	22–25	25–16	20–25	23–25		90–91	Report

==== Leg 5 ====
Date	Time		Score		Set 1	Set 2	Set 3	Set 4	Set 5	Total	Report
5 Jul	17:30	Slovenia	1–3	Azerbaijan	25–21	19–25	17–25	21–25		82–96	Report
5 Jul	20:00	Turkey	3–0	Bulgaria	25–19	25–22	25–17			75–58	Report
6 Jul	17:30	Slovenia	3–2	Azerbaijan	19–25	23–25	25–20	30–28	15–7	112–105	Report
6 Jul	20:00	Turkey	3–0	Bulgaria	25–23	25–23	25–17			75–63	Report

==== Leg 6 ====
Date	Time		Score		Set 1	Set 2	Set 3	Set 4	Set 5	Total	Report
11 Jul	18:00	Azerbaijan	3–2	Bulgaria	20–25	21–25	25–19	25–18	15–9	106–96	Report
11 Jul	20:30	Slovenia	1–3	Turkey	24–26	26–24	23–25	24–26		97–101	Report
12 Jul	18:00	Azerbaijan	3–0	Bulgaria	25–18	29–27	25–15			79–60	Report
12 Jul	18:00	Slovenia	0–3	Turkey	21–25	19–25	24–26			64–76	Report

=== Pool B ===
Pos	Team	Pld	W	L	Pts	SW	SL	SR	SPW	SPL	SPR	Qualification
1	Germany	12	9	3	26	30	11	2.727	967	826	1.171	Final
2	Poland	12	7	5	20	22	21	1.048	979	919	1.065	
3	Spain	12	5	7	16	20	25	0.800	934	1027	0.909	
4	Greece	12	3	9	10	14	29	0.483	900	1008	0.893	

==== Leg 1 ====
Date	Time		Score		Set 1	Set 2	Set 3	Set 4	Set 5	Total	Report
6 Jun	14:30	Poland	3–0	Greece	25–12	26–24	25–14			76–50	Report
7 Jun	19:00	Germany	3–0	Spain	25–15	25–10	25–17			75–42	Report
8 Jun	14:30	Poland	3–2	Greece	23–25	26–28	25–19	25–16	15–4	114–92	Report
8 Jun	15:30	Germany	3–0	Spain	25–19	25–18	25–14			75–51	Report

==== Leg 2 ====
Date	Time		Score		Set 1	Set 2	Set 3	Set 4	Set 5	Total	Report
13 Jun	18:00	Greece	3–1	Germany	25–20	25–18	24–26	25–20		99–84	Report
13 Jun	19:30	Spain	1–3	Poland	25–21	12–25	24–26	14–25		75–97	Report
14 Jun	19:30	Spain	1–3	Poland	25–20	18–25	18–25	16–25		77–95	Report
15 Jun	17:30	Greece	0–3	Germany	25–27	23–25	20–25			68–77	Report

==== Leg 3 ====
Date	Time		Score		Set 1	Set 2	Set 3	Set 4	Set 5	Total	Report
20 Jun	17:30	Greece	3–0	Poland	25–21	25–18	25–23			75–62	Report
20 Jun	19:30	Spain	2–3	Germany	25–18	25–21	22–25	23–25	7–15	102–104	Report
21 Jun	17:30	Greece	3–1	Poland	25–19	16–25	25–21	25–22		91–87	Report
21 Jun	19:30	Spain	3–1	Germany	25–17	25–19	13–25	25–23		88–84	Report

==== Leg 4 ====
Date	Time		Score		Set 1	Set 2	Set 3	Set 4	Set 5	Total	Report
27 Jun	19:30	Spain	3–1	Greece	19–25	26–24	25–22	25–23		95–94	Report
28 Jun	19:30	Spain	3–0	Greece	25–22	25–16	25–22			75–60	Report
28 Jun	20:00	Poland	0–3	Germany	15–25	20–25	16–25			51–75	Report
29 Jun	18:00	Poland	3–1	Germany	19–25	25–18	25–19	25–23		94–85	Report

==== Leg 5 ====
Date	Time		Score		Set 1	Set 2	Set 3	Set 4	Set 5	Total	Report
4 Jul	19:00	Greece	1–3	Spain	25–19	23–25	22–25	23–25		93–94	Report
5 Jul	15:00	Germany	3–0	Poland	25–20	25–23	27–25			77–68	Report
5 Jul	19:00	Greece	1–3	Spain	25–19	13–25	21–25	16–25		75–94	Report
6 Jul	15:00	Germany	3–0	Poland	31–29	25–15	25–16			81–60	Report

==== Leg 6 ====
Date	Time		Score		Set 1	Set 2	Set 3	Set 4	Set 5	Total	Report
11 Jul	20:00	Poland	3–0	Spain	25–14	25–19	26–24			76–57	Report
11 Jul	20:00	Germany	3–0	Greece	25–22	25–12	25–11			75–45	Report
12 Jul	20:00	Poland	3–1	Spain	25–19	24–26	25–18	25–21		99–84	Report
13 Jul	15:00	Germany	3–0	Greece	25–21	25–20	25–17			75–58	Report

== Final ==
Team 1	Agg.	Team 2	1st leg	2nd leg
Turkey	6–2	Germany	3–1	3–1

Date	Time		Score		Set 1	Set 2	Set 3	Set 4	Set 5	Total	Report
16 Jul	17:00	Turkey	3–1	Germany	25–15	25–23	16–25	25–21		91–84	Report
19 Jul	13:00	Germany	1–3	Turkey	19–25	23–25	25–20	20–25		87–95	Report

== Final standing ==
Rank	Team
1st place, gold medalist(s)	Turkey
2nd place, silver medalist(s)	Germany
3rd place, bronze medalist(s)	Poland
4	Azerbaijan
5	Spain
6	Bulgaria
7	Slovenia
8	Greece

Qualified for the 2015 World Grand Prix

2014 Women's European League winners

Turkey
First title

== Awards ==
- MVP: (Turkey) Kübra Akman
