= Legionovia Legionowo (women's volleyball) =

Polish women's volleyball club

- Short name: Legionovia
- Founded: 1957
- Ground: Arena Legionowo (Capacity: 2000)
- Chairman: Zbigniew Madejski
- Manager: Alessandro Chiappini; Adrian Chyliński (assistant)
- Captain: Maja Tokarska
- League: Polish Women's Volleyball League
- 2020-21: 8th
- Website: Club home page

Uniforms
Home	Away

Legionovia Legionowo is a Polish professional women's volleyball club, founded initially in 1957 as a section of a multi-sports club of the same name. The senior professional team is a separate legal entity to the academy and its reserve team.

== Naming history ==
- 2003-2011 LTS Legionovia Legionowo
- 2011-2013 Siódemka Legionovia Legionowo
- 2013-2014 Siódemka SK Bank Legionovia Legionowo
- 2014-2015 SK Bank Legionovia Legionowo
- 2015-2018 Legionovia Legionowo
- 2018-2020 DPD Legionovia Legionowo
- 2021- IŁ Capital Legionovia Legionowo

== Achievements ==
- I liga:
  - Winners: 2011-12
- II liga:
  - Winners: 2010–11, 2002–03
  - Runners-up: 2007–08, 2001–02
- III liga:
  - Winners: 1999-00
- Polish Cup:
  - Semi-finals: 2019-20
  - Quarter-finals: 2018–19, 2015–16
