= PTPS Piła =

Polish women's volleyball club

Enea PTPS Piła
- Full name: Pilskie Towarzystwo Piłki Siatkowej Spółka Akcyjna
- Short name: PTPS Piła
- Founded: 1993
- Ground: MOSiR Sports Hall, Piła, Poland (Capacity: 1,500)
- Chairman: Radosław Ciemięga
- Head coach: Jacek Pasiński
- League: TAURON Liga
- 2020–21: 12th
- Website: Club home page

Uniforms
Home	Away

Pilskie Towarzystwo Piłki Siatkowej Piła or simply PTPS Piła, is a Polish women's volleyball club based in Piła and playing in the Orlen Liga.

== Previous names ==
Due to sponsorship, the club have competed under the following names:

- PTPS Prasa Piła (1993–1995)
- PTPS Nafta Piła (1995–2001)
- PTPS Nafta-Gaz Piła (2001–2006)
- PTPS Nafta Piła (2006–2007)
- PTPS Farmutil Piła (2007–2009)
- PTPS Piła (2009–2013)
- PGNiG Nafta Piła (2013–2015)
- PTPS Piła (2015–2016)
- Enea PTPS Piła (2016–present)

== History ==
The club was founded in May 1993 under the name Pilskiego Towarzystwa Piłki Siatkowej Prasa, taking over the volleyball activities of B1 league side WKS Sokół. In its first season (1993–94) the club gained promotion to the A1 league, but without necessary support the club had financial issues and was relegated at the end of its first A1 league season. Supported by new sponsors, the club achieved league A1 promotion in 1997 with success following shortly after with 4 consecutive Polish Championships (1998–99, 1999–00, 2000–01, 2001–02) and 3 Polish Cup titles (1999–00, 2001–02, 2002–03) during a six-year period (from 1997 to 2003). Sponsorship issues in the following years affected the club's performances (it won the Polish Cup in 2007–08 and the Polish Super Cup in 2008) culminating in an agreement with Atom Trefl Sopot for the club's withdraw from the league in May 2010. In the agreement, made in order for PTPS to restructure, Atom Trefl and PTPS switched places (Atom took PTPS place in the highest league with PTPS replacing Atom in the second division). After its first season at the second division, the club gained promotion back to the highest league.

It has also participated in European competitions (Champions League, CEV Cup and Challenge Cup) finishing 4th in 1999–00 Champions League.

== Honours ==
=== National competitions ===
- Polish Championship: 4

1998–99, 1999–00, 2000–01, 2001–02

- Polish Cup: 4

1999–00, 2001–02, 2002–03, 2007–08

- Polish Super Cup: 1

2008

== Team ==
Season 2016–2017, as of March 2017.

Number	Player	Position	Height (m)	Weight (kg)	Birth date
1	(Poland) Karolina Piśla	Outside hitter	1.85	75	8 May 1996 (age 28)
2	(Poland) Sylwia Kucharska	Setter	1.78	64	8 November 1995 (age 29)
3	(United States) Alexis Austin	Outside hitter	1.84	78	21 April 1994 (age 30)
4	(Poland) Anita Kwiatkowska	Opposite	1.84	68	5 March 1985 (age 40)
5	(Poland) Żaneta Baran	Opposite	1.88	72	23 August 1989 (age 35)
6	(Poland) Adrianna Kukulska	Outside hitter	1.77	67	4 October 1998 (age 26)
8	(Poland) Anna Stencel	Middle blocker	1.87	72	28 August 1995 (age 29)
9	(Canada) Alicia Ogoms	Middle blocker	1.92	89	2 April 1994 (age 30)
11	(Poland) Agata Babicz	Outside hitter	1.71	63	16 March 1986 (age 39)
13	(Croatia) Beta Dumančić	Middle blocker	1.89	75	26 March 1991 (age 33)
14	(Poland) Emilia Szubert	Setter	1.80	62	10 March 1992 (age 33)
15	(Poland) Alicja Markiewicz	Libero	1.71	73	13 August 1991 (age 33)
16	(Poland) Zuzanna Kucińska	Libero	1.74	58	9 December 1994 (age 30)
17	(Poland) Oliwia Urban	Outside hitter	1.83	67	21 November 1996 (age 28)
