= Agnieszka Korneluk =

Polish volleyball player (born 1994)

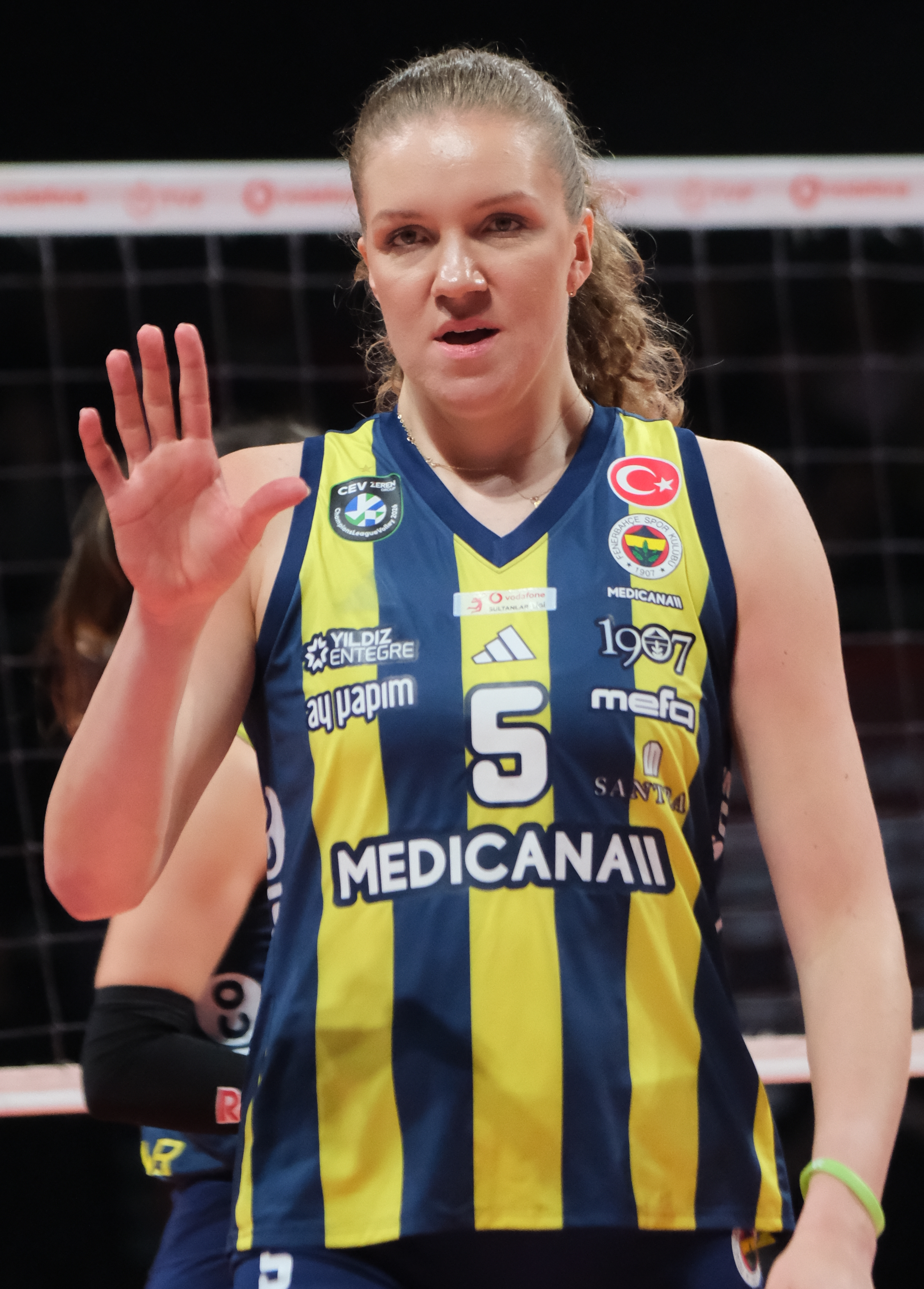

Personal information
- Nationality: Polish
- Born: 17 October 1994 (age 32) Poznań, Poland
- Height: 2.04 m (6 ft 8 in)
- Weight: 75 kg (165 lb)

Volleyball information
- Position: Middle blocker
- Current club: Fenerbahçe
- Number: 5

Career
- Years: Team
- 2005–2010: (Poland) KS Energetyk Poznań
- 2010–2013: (Poland) SMS PZPS Sosnowiec
- 2013–2017: (Poland) Impel Wrocław
- 2017–2018: (Poland) Grot Budowlani Łódź
- 2018–2019: (Italy) Pomì Casalmaggiore
- 2019–2020: (Italy) Pallavolo Scandicci
- 2020–2024: (Poland) KPS Chemik Police
- 2024–2025: (Poland) KS Developres Rzeszów
- 2025–2026: (Turkey) Fenerbahçe

National team
- Years: Team
- 2012–2026: Poland (5)
Honours
Women's volleyball
Representing Poland
FIVB Nations League
Bronze medal – third place	2023 Arlington	Team
Bronze medal – third place	2024 Bangkok	Team
Bronze medal – third place	2025 Łódź	Team
Women's European Volleyball League
Bronze medal – third place	2014
European Games
Silver medal – second place	2015 Baku
Montreux Volley Masters
Gold medal – first place	2019 Montreux
- Updated on 28 July 2025

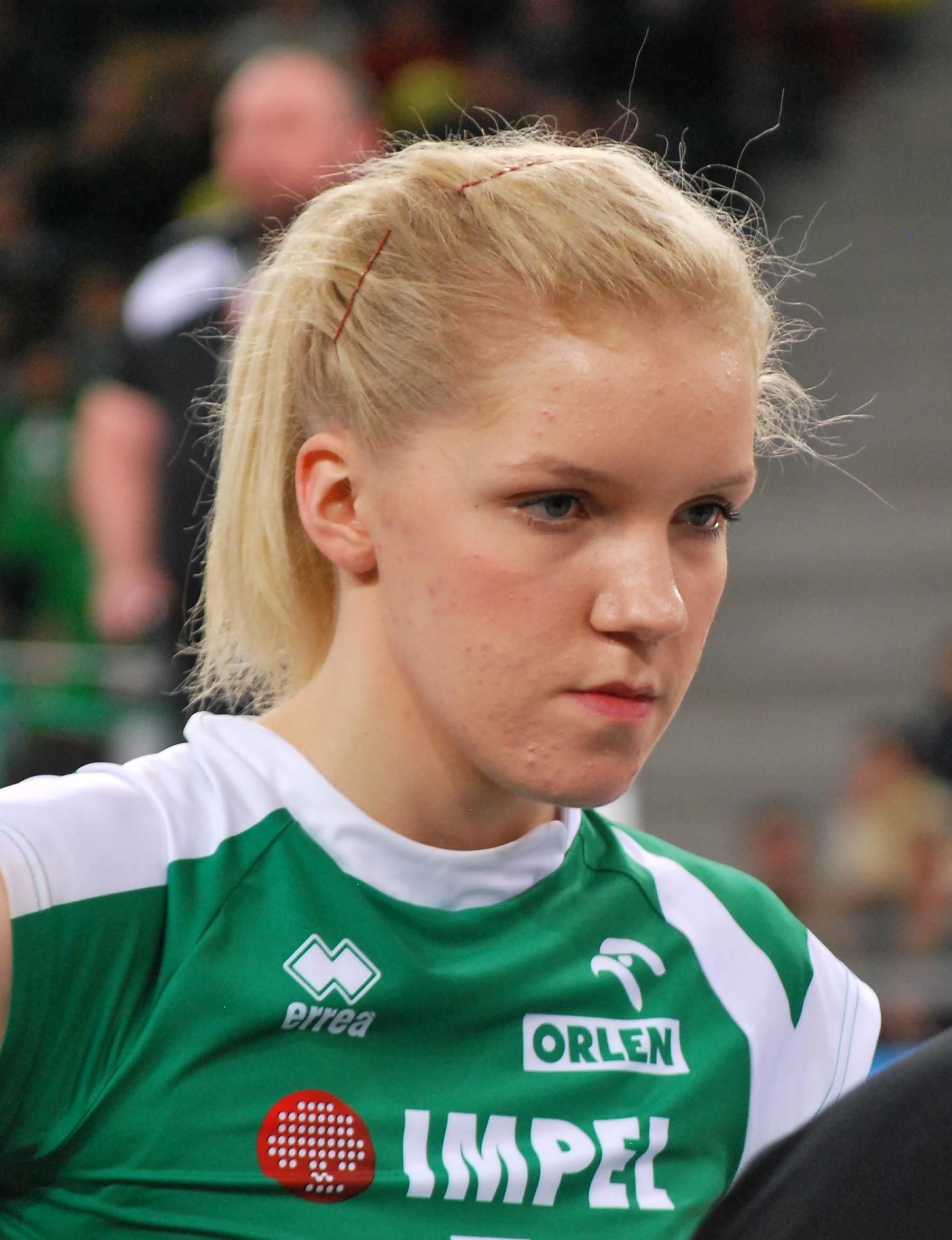

Agnieszka Korneluk, née Kąkolewska (born 17 October 1994) is a Polish volleyball player of Fenerbahçe. She is playing as a middle blocker and part of the Poland women's national volleyball team.

She competed at the 2013 Women's European Volleyball Championship, and 2019 Montreux Volley Masters. On club level she played for SMS PZPS Sosnowiec.

In 2026, Korneluk announced she would retire from volleyball all together. She won three VNL Bronze Medals, and was named best MB in the VNL in 2024 and 2025, leaving a legacy for Polish Volleyball.

== Awards ==
=== Club ===
- (Poland) Grot Budowlani Łódź (2017–2018)
  - Polish Cup (1): 2017-2018
  - Polish Super Cup (1): 2017-2018
- (Poland) KPS Chemik Police (2020–2024)
  - Polish Championship (3): 2020-2021, 2021-2022, 2023-24
  - Polish Cup (2): 2020-2021, 2022-2023
  - Polish Super Cup (1): 2023-2024
- (Poland) KS Developres Rzeszów (2024–2025)
  - Polish Championship (1): 2024-25
  - Polish Cup (1): 2024-2025
- (Turkey) Fenerbahçe (2025–...)
  - Turkish Super Cup (1): 2025

=== Individual ===
- 2014 Polish Championship "Best Blocker"
- 2017 Polish Championship "Best Blocker"
- 2018 Polish Championship "Best Blocker"
- 2018 Polish Super Cup "MVP"
- 2019 Montreux Volley Masters "Best Middle Blocker"
- 2019 European Championship "Best Middle Blocker"
- 2024 Volleyball Nations League "Best Middle Blocker"
- 2025 Volleyball Nations League "Best Middle Blocker"
- 2023 Polish Championship "Best Blocker"
- 2025 Polish Championship "Best Middle Blocker"
- 2024 Polish Championship "Best Attacker"
- 2024 Polish Championship "Best Middle Blocker"
- 2025 Polish Championship "MVP"
- 2025 Polish Championship "Best Middle Blocker"
