= Mariola Wojtowicz =

Polish volleyball player

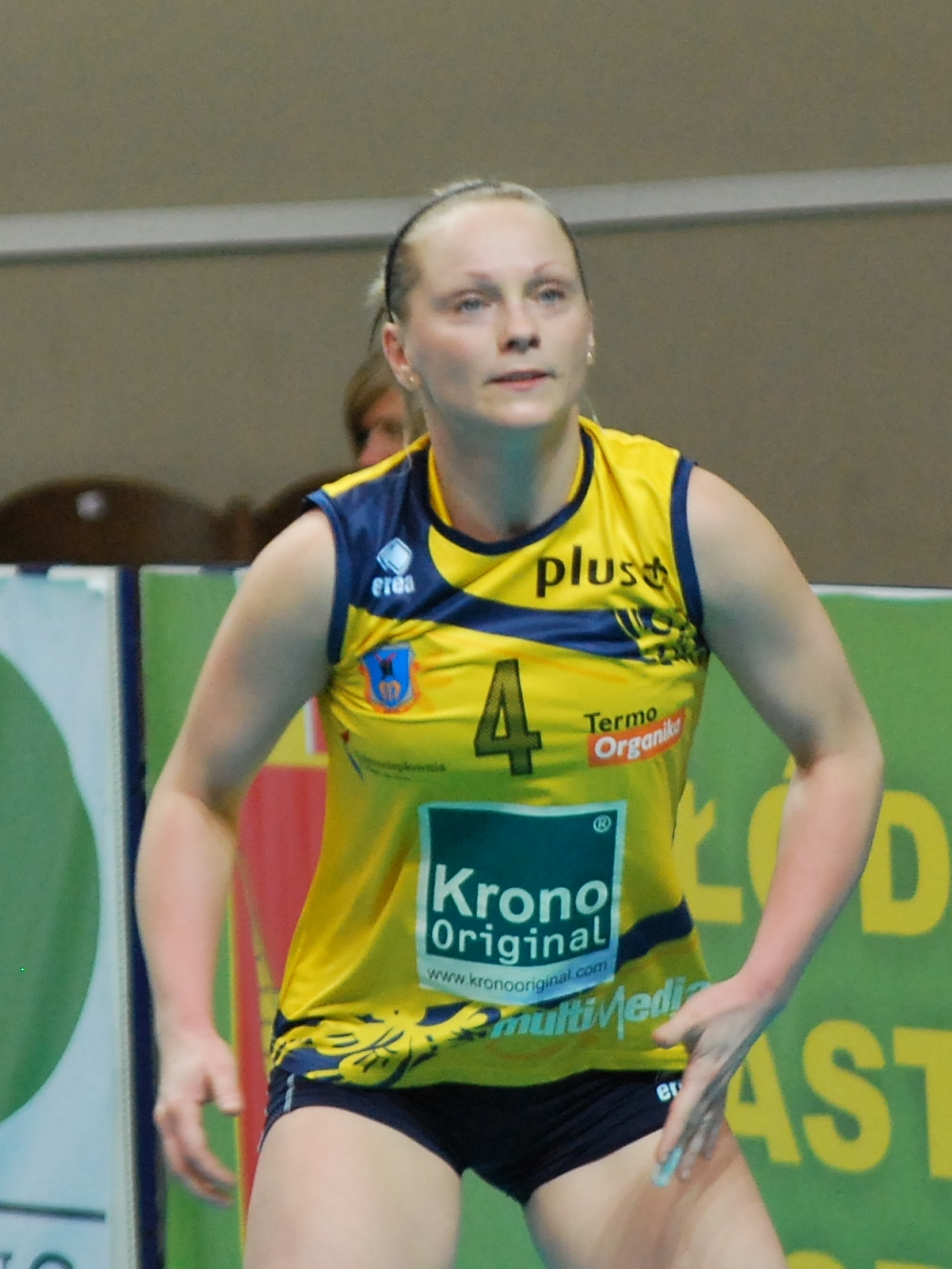

Personal information
- Nationality: Polish
- Born: 4 January 1980 (age 46); Lubań
- Height: 5 ft 5 in (1.64 m)

Volleyball information
- Position: Libero

Career
Years	Teams
2000-2007; 2007-2008; 2008-2009; 2009-2010; 2010-2011; 2011-2012; 2012-2017	(Poland) BKS Stal Bielsko-Biała (Russia) Leningradka Saint Petersburg (Poland) Pronar Zeto Astwa AZS Białystok (Poland) BKS Aluprof Bielsko-Biała (Poland) Silesia Volley I Mysłowice/Chorzów (Poland) KPSK Stal Mielec (Poland) BKS Aluprof Bielsko-Biała

Mariola Wojtowicz (born 4 January 1980) is a Polish volleyball player, playing in position libero.

== Sporting achievements ==
=== Clubs ===
Polish Championship:

- 2003, 2004, 2010
- 2007

Polish Cup:

- 2004, 2006

Polish Supercup:

- 2006

=== National team ===
Universiade:

- 2007
- 2005
