= Magdalena Sadowska =

Polish volleyball player

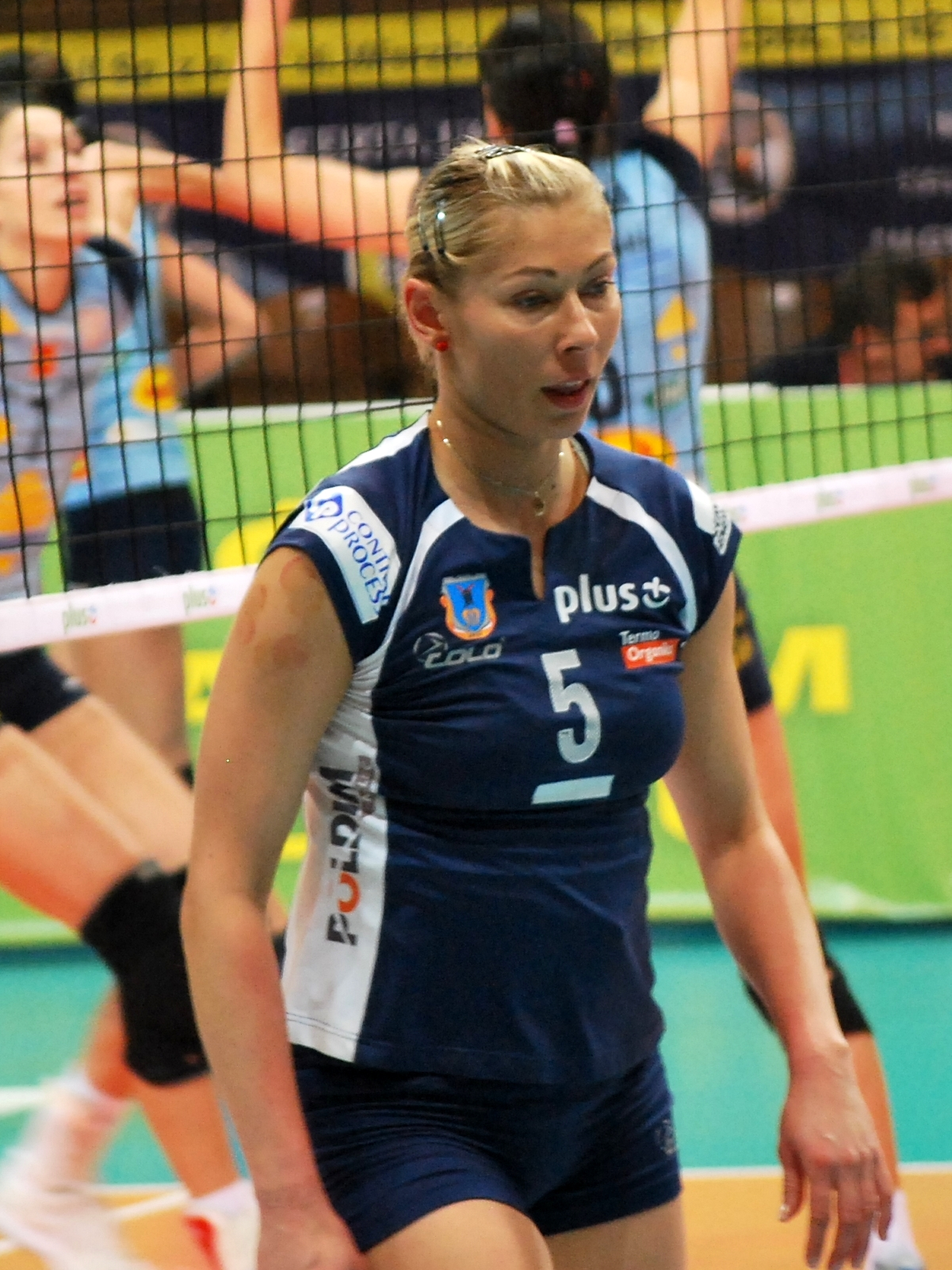

Personal information
- Born: 26 August 1979 (age 47)
- Spike: 305 cm (120 in)
- Block: 296 cm (117 in)

Volleyball information
- Number: 5

Career
Years	Teams
2013-2014	MKS Świdnica

Magdalena Sadowska (born 26 August 1979 Świdnica) is a Polish volleyball player who played in the Polish Women's Volleyball League.

== Playing career ==
She participated at the 2001–02 Women's CEV Cup, with Skra Warszawa.

== Clubs ==
Club	From	To
POL Skra Warszawa	2001-2002	2006-2007
GER VfB Suhl	2007-2008	2007-2008
POL Dąbrowa Górnicza	2008-2009	2009-2010
POL KPSK Stal Mielec	2010-2011	2011-2012
POL Eliteski AZS UEK	2012-2013	2012-2013
POL MKS Polonia Świdnica	2013-2014	...
