= Gwardia Wrocław (women's volleyball) =

Polish women's volleyball club

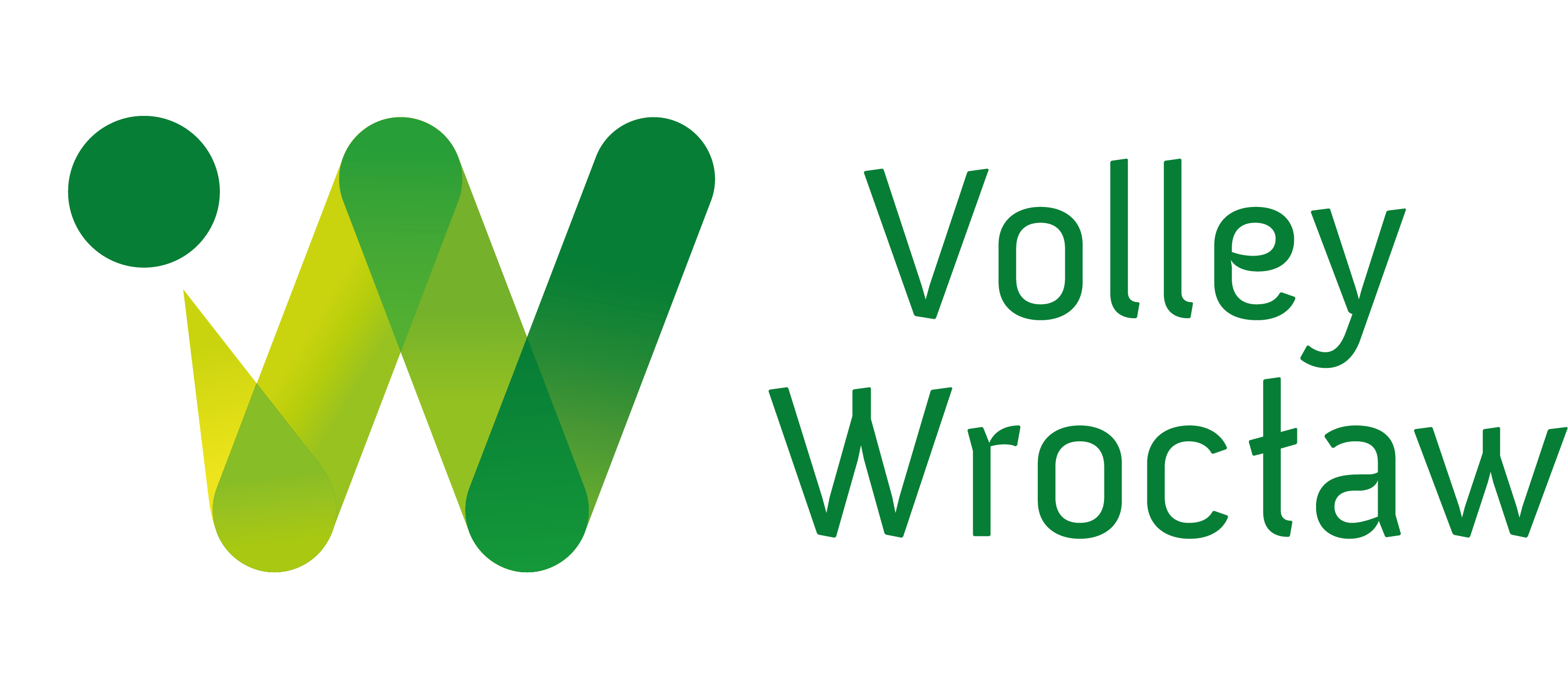
- Full name: Volleyball Wrocław Spółka Akcyjna
- Founded: 1945
- Ground: Hala Orbita, Wrocław, Poland (Capacity: 3,000)
- Chairman: Jacek Grabowski
- Head coach: Marek Solarewicz
- League: Polish Volleyball League
- 2020–21: 10th

Uniforms
Home	Away

Gwardia Wrocław, officially Volleyball Wrocław stylised as #VolleyWrocław for sponsorship reasons, is a Polish women's volleyball club based in Wrocław and playing in the Polish Volleyball League.

== Previous names ==
Due to sponsorship, the club have competed under the following names:

- KS Gwardia Wrocław (1945–1990s)
- ZEC ESV Gwardia Wrocław (1990s–2004)
- ZEC SV Gwardia Wrocław (2004–2006)
- Dialog Gwardia Wrocław (2006–2007)
- Impel Gwardia Wrocław (2007–2012)
- Impel Wrocław (2012–2018)
- #VolleyWrocław (2018–present)

== History ==
The club was established in July 1945 as the police sports club and was named Klub Sportowy Gwardia Wrocław. It offered many different sports (at its peak in the 1980s it had 19 sports departments) and volleyball has always been one of its most important departments. It gained importance in the 1990s when women's volleyball started to become professional in Poland. That commercialization brought sponsors (the club has been renamed few times through the years) and investors. The club first played in the highest Polish Women's Volleyball League in 1999 and has also participated in European competitions (Top Teams Cup and Challenge Cup).

=== 2010–2011 season ===
Since the new season there was more money in the budget. Impel Gwardia Wroclaw could afford good athletes. The top athletes in the club: Katarzyna Mroczkowska, Bogumiła Barańska, Joanna Wołosz, Monika Czypiruk, Zuzanna Efimienko, Dominika Sobolska, Ola Krzos have been preserved. The team left Olga Owczynnikowa, Aleksandra Szafraniec, Marta Czerwińska. Another player- Agnieszka Jagiełło ended his career volleyball. There have been interesting transfers. The team joined Anna Witczak of Muszynianka Muszyna, Ewa Matyjaszek and Maja Tokarska of PTPS Piła, the sister of Dominika Sobolska - Marta and returning after maternity leave Katarzyna Jaszewska. Additionally there was a change on the coach of physician coach- Christian Verona, who worked last season with the club Monte Schiavo Banca Marche Jesi. Ultimately, the team finished the game on the 5th place.

=== 2011–2012 season ===
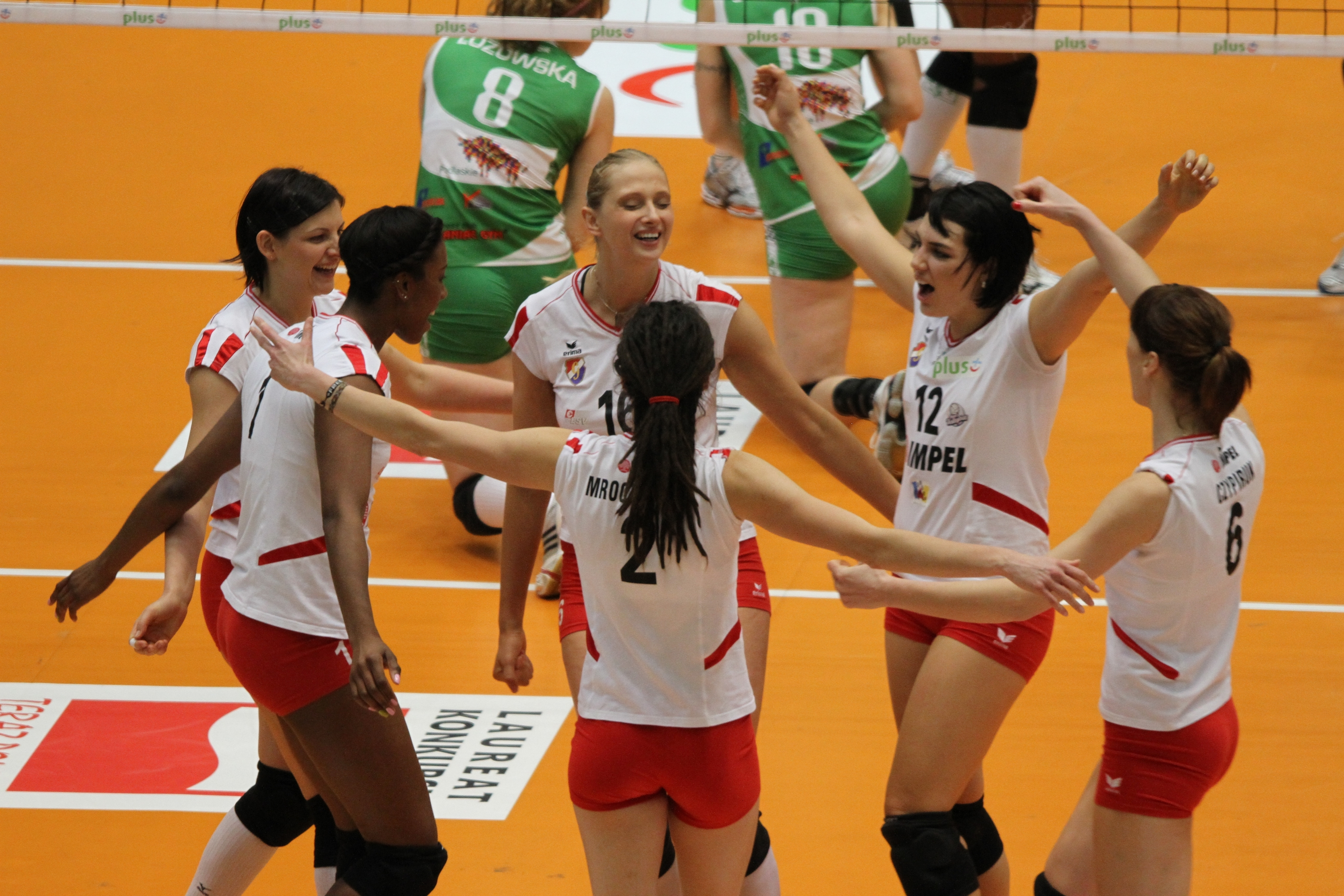
Gwardia Wrocław players in 2012

In 2011 the owner of the Impel Gwardia Wrocław became Impel S.A. The investor responsible for the team supervision is Impel Volleyball S.A.- the company belonging to the Impel Group. The core team from last season: Katarzyna Mroczkowska, Bogumiła Pyziołek or Anna Witczak hasn't been changed. The contract with the club has also renewed Katarzyna Jaszewska – Impel's Gwardia best volleyball player in the 2010/2011 season. Jaszewska along with Susan Efimienko represented our country at the last European Championship volleyball team taking the 5th place. Joanna Wołosz and Maja Tokarska left the team to join BKS Bielsko-Biała and Atom Trefl Sopot, respectively. In return the team strengthened: Arielle Wilson (from the USA - academic game), Milena Rosner, member of the Poland national team, which won the 2005 Women's European Volleyball Championship, Marta Haładyn (from MKS Dąbrowa Górnicza) and Dorota Medyńska (SMS Sosnowiec / TOP Bolesławiec). The injury healed Aleksandra Folta, which together with Dorota Medyńska is the youngest part of the Impel Gwardia. Women's team played in Women PlusLiga so far 15 matches, winning five of them. Team has the 17 points and followed by the 7th position. Team is doing very well in the Challenge Cup, advancing to 1 / 8 of the tournament. The team finished the game on the 5th place.

== Honours ==
- Polish Championship

Runners-up (1): 2013–14

- Polish Cup:

Runners-up (3): 1960–61, 2002–03, 2003–04

== Team ==
Season 2016–2017, as of March 2017.

Number	Player	Position	Height (m)	Weight (kg)	Birth date
1	(Czech Republic) Andrea Kossanyiová	Outside hitter	1.85	65	6 August 1993 (age 33)
3	(Poland) Monika Ptak	Middle blocker	1.88	76	14 May 1990 (age 36)
4	(Poland) Katarzyna Konieczna	Opposite	1.84	78	22 March 1985 (age 41)
5	(Poland) Agnieszka Kąkolewska	Middle blocker	1.99	85	17 October 1994 (age 31)
6	(Poland) Barbara Cembrzyńska	Opposite	1.85	70	19 May 1997 (age 29)
7	(Poland) Joanna Kaczor	Opposite	1.91	70	16 September 1984 (age 41)
9	(Poland) Agata Sawicka	Libero	1.81	72	17 January 1985 (age 41)
10	(Poland) Izabela Bałucka	Middle blocker	1.85	77	15 February 1993 (age 33)
12	(United States) Micha Hancock	Setter	1.80	78	10 November 1992 (age 33)
13	(Poland) Adrianna Wysocka	Setter	1.86	72	12 June 1998 (age 28)
14	(Poland) Natalia Mędrzyk	Outside hitter	1.84	75	13 January 1992 (age 34)
15	(Poland) Magdalena Stasiak	Libero	1.63	60	10 July 1995 (age 31)
17	(United States) Megan Courtney	Outside hitter	1.86	66	27 October 1993 (age 32)
18	(Poland) Aleksandra Sikorska	Middle blocker	1.85	67	28 April 1993 (age 33)
First coach : POL Marek Solarewicz; Second coach: POL Wojciech Kurczyński; Assistant coach: POL Mateusz Żarczyński; Physiotherapist : POL Artur Hnida

2015–2016 Team
Number	Name and surname	Date of birth	Height	Nationality	Position
1	Andrea Kossanyiová	August 6, 1993	1,85	CZE	outside hitter
3	Monika Ptak	May 14, 1990	1,88	POL	middle blocker
4	Karolina Piśla	August 5, 1996	1,84	POL	outside hitter
5	Agnieszka Kąkolewska	October 17, 1994	1,99	POL	middle blocker
6	Barbara Cembrzyńska	May 19, 1997	1,85	POL	opposite
7	Joanna Kaczor	September 16, 1984	1,91	POL	opposite
8	Lenka Dürr	December 10, 1990	1,71	GER	libero
9	Agata Sawicka	January 17, 1985	1,81	POL	libero
10	Kristin Hildebrand	June 30, 1985	1,85	USA	outside hitter
11	Aleksandra Sikorska	April 28, 1993	1,86	POL	middle blocker
12	Milena Radecka	October 18, 1984	1,78	POL	setter
13	Magdalena Gryka	March 28, 1994	1,78	POL	setter
14	Aleksandra Sochacka	May 5, 1997	1,81	POL	outside hitter
15	Magdalena Stasiak	July 10, 1995	1,63	POL	libero
17	Katarzyna Skowrońska-Dolata	June 30, 1983	1,89	POL	opposite
18	Carolina Costagrande	October 15, 1980	1,88	ITA	outside hitter
First coach : POL Jacek Grabowski; Second coach and statistics : POL Marek Solarewicz; Physiotherapist : POL Artur Hnida; Physician coach: ITA Christian Verona; Menager: POL Dariusz Gintowt

2011–2012 Team
Number	Name and surname	Date of birth	Height	Nationality	In the club since	Position
1	Arielle Wilson	January 3, 1989	1,91	USA	2011	middle blocker
2	Katarzyna Mroczkowska	December 30, 1980	1,82	POL	2002	opposite
3	Anna Witczak	March 2, 1982	1,82	POL	2010	receiver
4	Marta Sobolska	February 16, 1987	1,80	BEL/POL	2010	receiver
5	Aleksandra Folta	June 20, 1992	1,82	POL	ward	receiver
6	Monika Czypiruk	July 27, 1982	1,86	POL	2009	opposite
7	Ewa Matyjaszek	April 23, 1979	1,76	POL	2010	setter
8	Aleksandra Krzos	June 23, 1989	1,81	POL	ward	libero
9	Katarzyna Jaszewska	December 6, 1981	1,81	POL	2010	receiver
10	Bogumiła Pyziołek	December 1, 1986	1,80	POL	2002	receiver
11	Dorota Medyńska	April 25, 1993	1,68	POL	2011	libero
12	Marta Haładyn	January 3, 1988	1,79	POL	ward	setter
13	Milena Rosner	January 4, 1980	1,80	POL	2011	receiver
15	Dominika Sobolska	December 3, 1991	1,91	BEL/POL	2009	middle blocker
16	Zuzanna Efimienko	August 8, 1989	1,97	POL	2007	middle blocker
First coach : POL Rafał Błaszczyk; Second coach and statistics : POL Marek Solarewicz; Physiotherapist : POL Artur Hnida; Physician coach: ITA Christian Verona; Menager: POL Dariusz Gintowt

2009–2010 Team
Number	Name	Height	Nationality	In club since	Position
1	Olga Owczynnikowa	1,80	Belarus / Poland	2009	Setter
2	Katarzyna Mroczkowska	1,81	Poland	2002	Middle Blocker
6	Monika Czypiruk	1,84	Poland	2009	Wing Spiker
8	Aleksandra Krzos	1,80	Poland	2007	Opposite / Libero
9	Marta Czerwińska	1,79	Poland	2008	Wing Spiker
10	Bogumiła Barańska	1,80	Poland	2002	Wing Spiker
11	Agnieszka Jagiełło	1,67	Poland	?	Opposite / Libero
12	Joanna Wołosz	1,81	Poland	2009	Setter
13	Aleksandra Szafraniec	1,92	Poland	2008	Middle Blocker
15	Dominika Sobolska	1,91	Belgium / Poland	2009	Middle Blocker
16	Zuzanna Efimienko	1,96	Poland	2007	Middle Blocker
Manager : POL Rafał Błaszczyk; Physiotherapist: POL Artur Hnida; Statistics: POL Marek Solarewicz
