= Magdalena Woźniczka =

Polish volleyball player

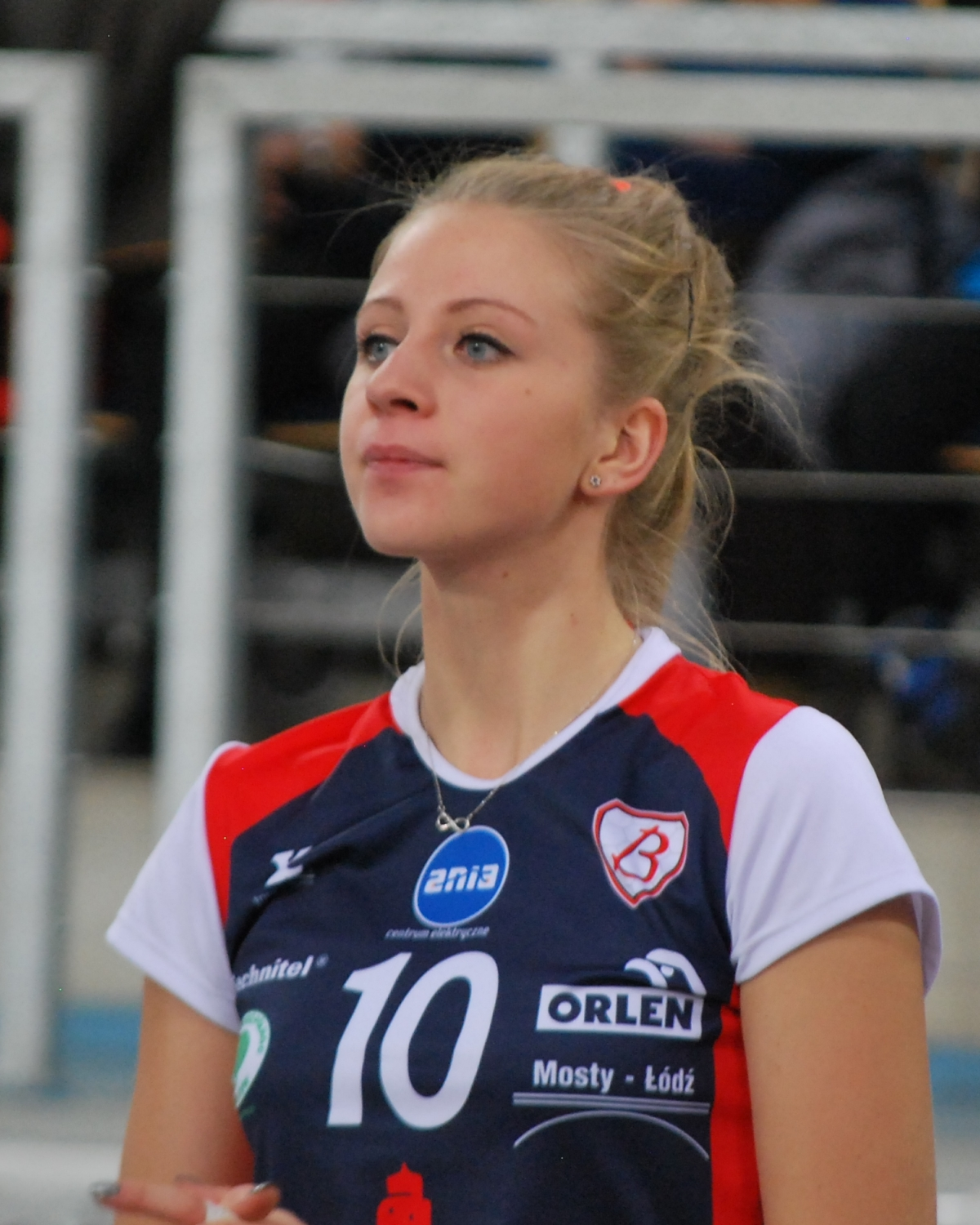

Personal information
- Nationality: Polish
- Born: 11 April 1997 (age 29)
- Height: 177 cm (5 ft 10 in)
- Weight: 65 kg (143 lb)
- Spike: 285 cm (112 in)

Volleyball information
- Position: Outside hitter
- Current club: (Poland) Libero Aleksandrów Łódzki

Career
Years	Teams
2014-2016; 2016-2019; 2019-2020; 2020-2022	(Poland) Budowlani Łódź (Poland) UNI Opole (Poland) UKS Szóstka Mielec (Poland) Libero Aleksandrów Łódzki

Magdalena Woźniczka (born 11 April 1997) is a Polish volleyball player, playing in position outside hitter. Since the 2020/2021 season, she has played for Libero VIP Biesiadowo Aleksandrów Łódzki.

Her twin sister Maria is also a volleyball player.

== Sporting achievements ==
=== Clubs ===
Polish Junior Championships:

- 2015
