= Klaudia Konieczna =

Polish volleyball player (born 1995)

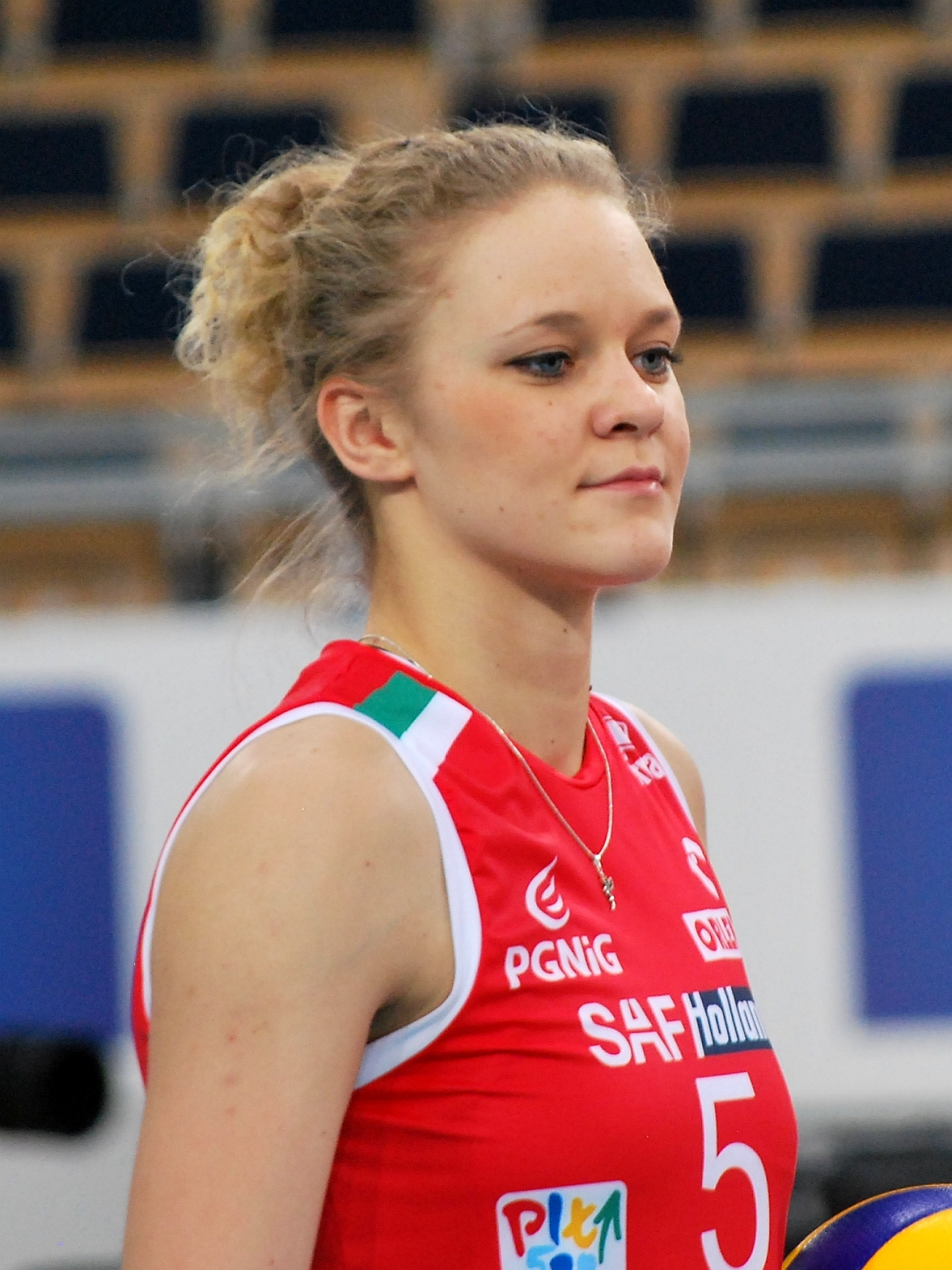
Konieczna in 2013

Klaudia Konieczna (born 7 September 1995) is a Polish volleyball player. She plays for Karpaty Krosno, having formerly played for PTPS Piła in the Orlen Liga.
