= Paula Słonecka =

Polish volleyball player

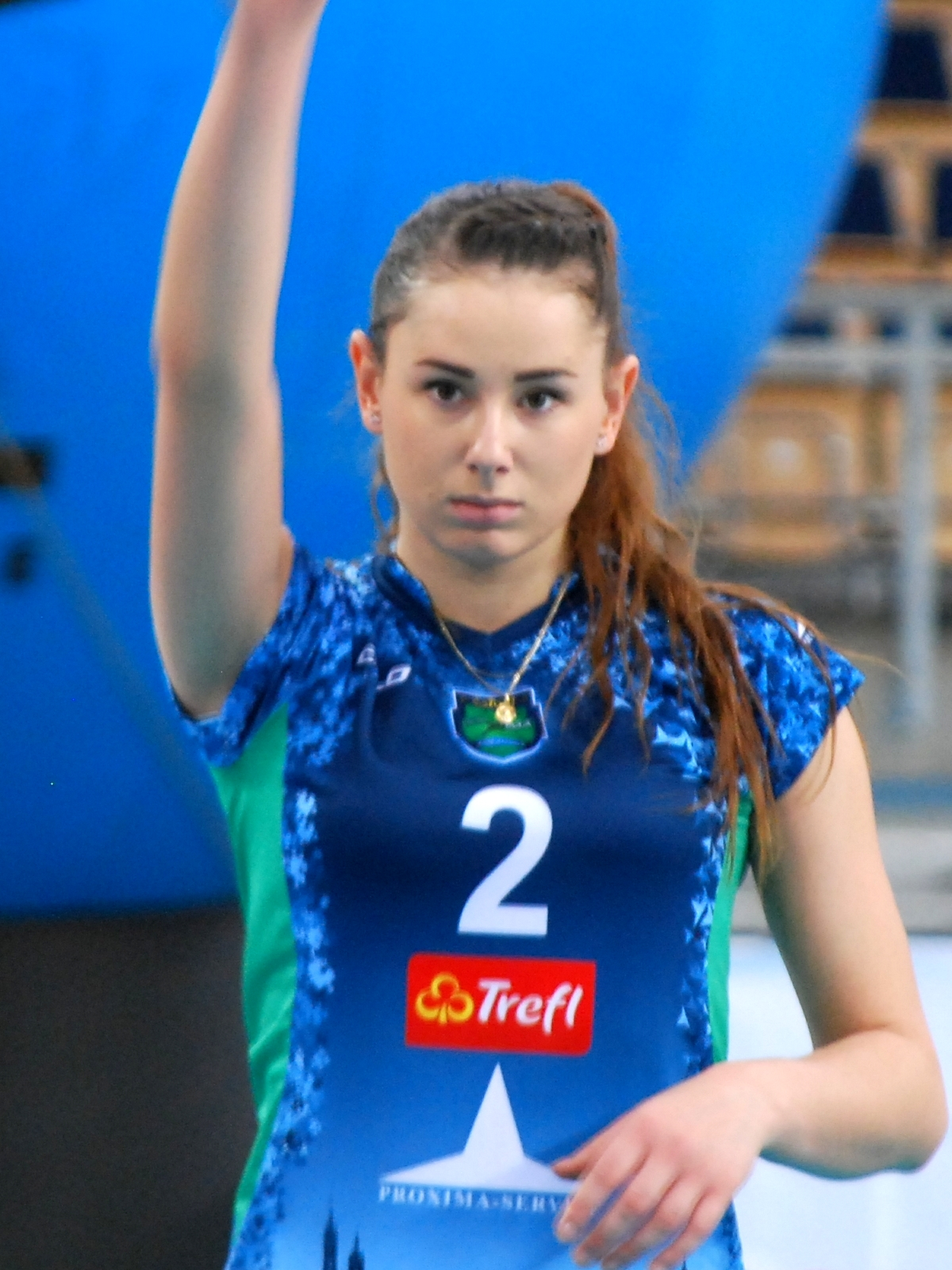

Personal information
- Nationality: Polish
- Born: 9 April 1992 (age 34); Biała Podlaska
- Height: 1.80 cm (1 in)
- Weight: 70 kg (154 lb)
- Spike: 300 cm (118 in)

Volleyball information
- Position: Outside hitter
- Current club: (Poland) Volleyball Wrocław

Career
Years	Teams
2011-2012; 2012-2013; 2013-2016; 2016-2018; 2018-01.2019; 01.2019-2020; 2020-	(Poland) KSZO Ostrowiec Świętokrzyski (Poland) Budowlani Toruń (Poland) PWSZ Karpaty Krosno (Poland) Trefl Proxima Kraków (Poland) KSZO Ostrowiec Świętokrzyski (Poland) Enea PTPS Piła (Poland) Volleyball Wrocław

Paula Słonecka (born 9 April 1992) is a Polish volleyball player, playing in position outside hitter. Since the 2020/2021 season, she has played for Volleyball Wrocław.
