= Paulina Bałdyga =

Polish volleyball player (born 1996)

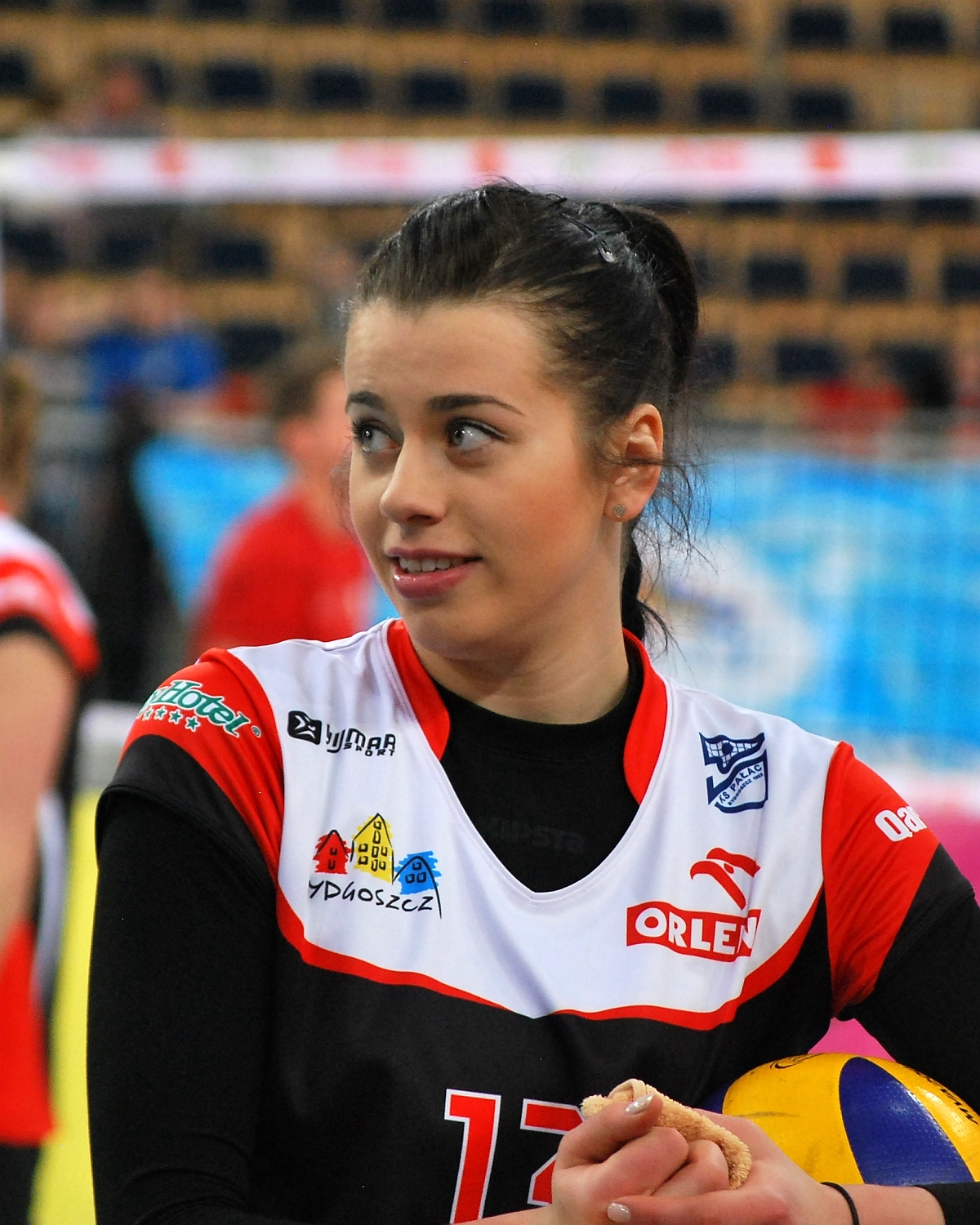
Bałdyga in 2015

Paulina Bałdyga (born 24 July 1996) is a Polish volleyball player. She plays for KC Pałac Bydgoszcz in the Orlen Liga.

Bałdyga was part of the winning Polish team at the 2013 Girls' Youth European Volleyball Championship.
