= Polish Seria A Volleyball League =

Polish Seria A Volleyball League means

- PlusLiga, the highest level of men's volleyball in Poland
- Polish Women's Volleyball League
