= Martyna Grajber =

Polish volleyball player

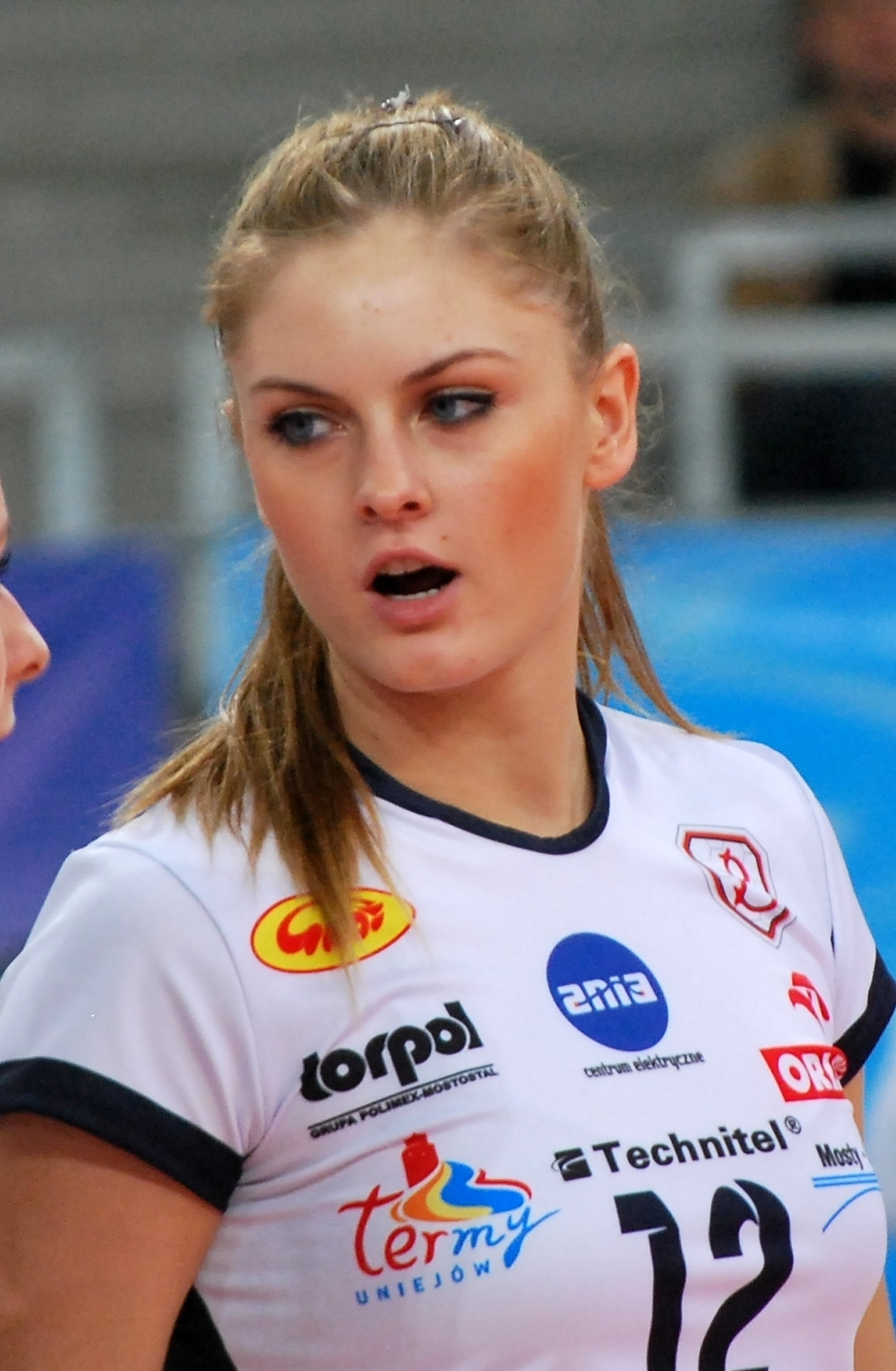
- Grajber in 2013

Personal information
- Nationality: Polish
- Born: 28 March 1995 (age 31); Żywiec, Poland
- Height: 180 cm (71 in)
- Weight: 67 kg (148 lb)
- Spike: 297 cm (117 in)
- Block: 277 cm (109 in)

Volleyball information
- Position: Wing Spiker (Outside Hitter)
- Number: 15 (national team)

Career
Years	Teams
2013 –	Budowlani Łódź

National team
Poland
Honours
Women's Volleyball
Representing Poland
Montreux Volley Masters
Gold medal – first place	2019 Montreux	Team

Martyna Grajber (born 28 March 1995) is a Polish volleyball player. She plays for Budowlani Łódź in the Polish Orlen Liga.

She was part of the Polish squad that competed at the 2016 FIVB Volleyball World Grand Prix.

== Awards ==
=== Individual ===
- 2019 Montreux Volley Masters "Best outside spiker"
