= Magdalena Banecka =

Polish volleyball player

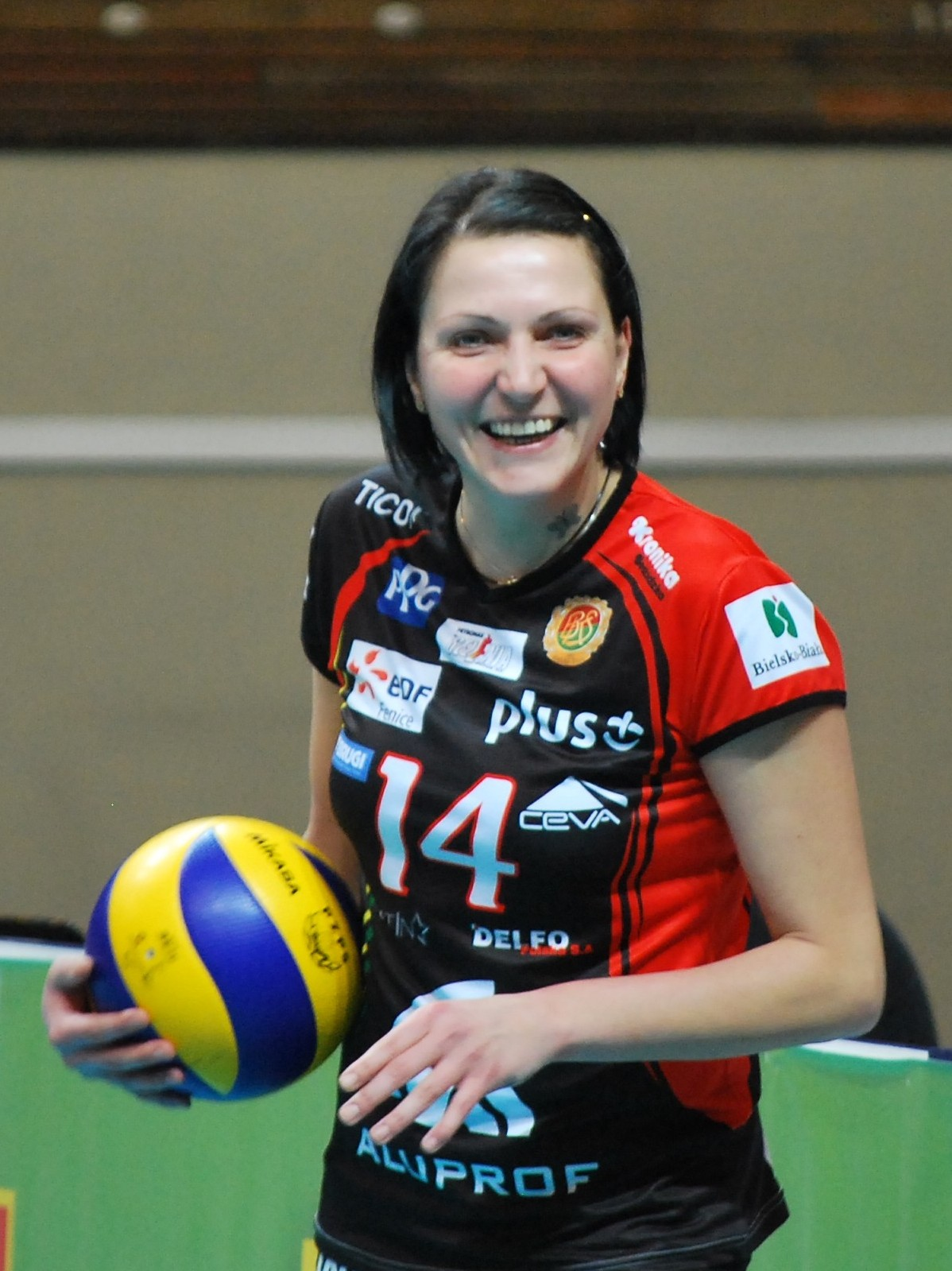

Personal information
- Born: 11 February 1980 (age 46)

Volleyball information
- Position: libero

Magdalena Banecka (born 11 February 1980) is a Polish volleyball player who played in the Polish Women's Volleyball League.

== Playing career ==
She participated at the 2011–12 Women's CEV Cup, with BKS Bielsko-Biała.

== Clubs ==
Club	Country	From	To
AZS AWF Poznań	Poland	2004-2005	2004-2005
Muszynianka Muszyna	Poland	2005-2006	2006-2007
KPSK Stal Mielec	Poland	2007-2008	2008-2009
BKS Szóstka Biłgoraj	Poland	2009-2010	2010-2011
BKS Bielsko-Biała	Poland	2011-2012	2011-2012
MLKS Zawisza Sulechów	Poland	2012-2013	2012-2013
