= Vincour =

Vincour (feminine: Vincourová) is a surname. Notable people with the surname include:

- David Vincour (born 1984), Czech ice dancer
- Pavla Vincourová (born 1992), Czech volleyball player
- Tomáš Vincour (born 1990), Czech ice hockey player
