= Orlen Liga =

- Orlen Basket Liga, the Polish Basketball League name from 2023
- Polish Women's Volleyball League in 2012–2017
