= Joanna Kaczor =

Polish volleyball player (born 1984)

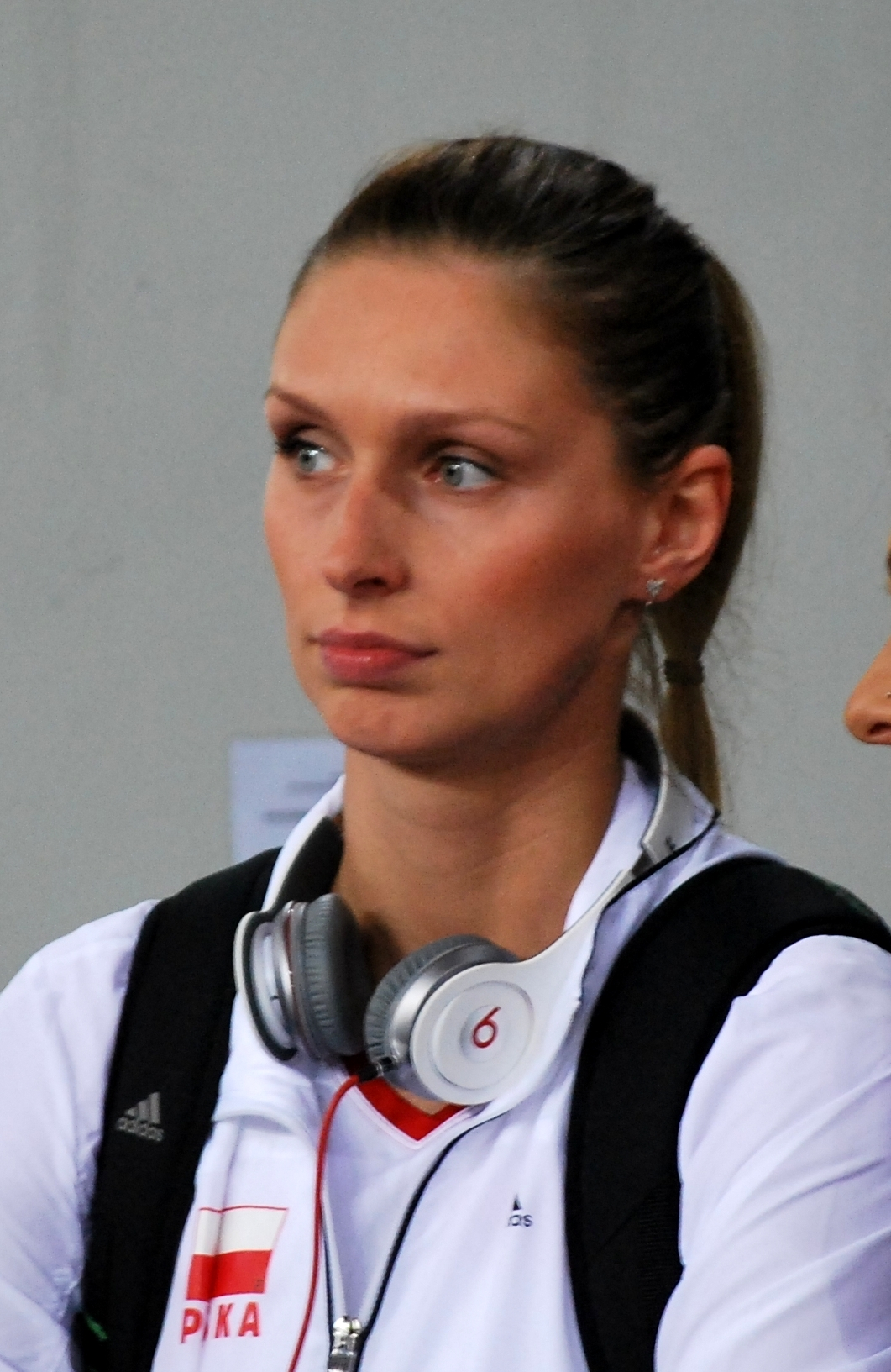

Personal information
- Full name: Joanna Kaczor
- Nickname: Asia
- Nationality: Polish
- Born: September 16, 1984 (age 42); Wrocław, Poland
- Height: 1.91 m (6 ft 3 in)
- Weight: 72 kg (159 lb)
- Spike: 314 cm (124 in)
- Block: 301 cm (119 in)

Volleyball information
- Position: Opposite
- Current team: (Poland) Impel Wrocław
- Number: 17 (club), 7 (national team)

Career
| Years | Teams |
|---|---|
| 1995–2005; 2005–2006; 2006–2008; 2008; 2008–2009; 2009–2010; 2010–2012; 2012–2013; 2013– | (Poland) Gwardia Wrocław (United States) Idaho Twin Falls (United States) USC Trojans (Poland) Gwardia Wrocław (Poland) Muszynianka Muszyna (Italy) River Volley Piacenza (Poland) Muszynianka Muszyna (Poland) MKS Dąbrowa Górnicza (Poland) Impel Wrocław |

National team
| 2003– | Poland |
Honours
Representing Poland
Women's volleyball
European Championship
| Bronze medal – third place | 2009 Poland |
- Last updated: 12 June 2015

Joanna Kaczor-Bednarska (born 16 September 1984) is a Polish volleyball player, a member of Poland women's national volleyball team and Polish club Impel Wrocław, a participant of the Olympic Games Beijing 2008, bronze medalist of European Championship 2009), Polish Champion (2009, 2011).

== Early life ==
Kaczor was born on September 16, 1984, in Wroclaw, Poland to Stanisław and Helena Kaczor.

== College career ==
=== College of Southern Idaho ===
Kaczor was the National Junior College Athletic Association Player of the Year in her 2005 freshman season after the team went 50–2 to win the NJCAA national championship under head coach Ben Stroud. Kaczor led the team with 605 kills on the season (4.96 kpg) with a .456 hitting percentage.

=== University of Southern California ===
Kaczor transferred to USC in 2006, and was a two time All-American and set several school single-season and career marks She set the top two single-season records for kills (659 in 2007 and 563 in 2006), top two marks for attempts (1,542 in 2007 and 1,272 in 2006), top two marks for total points (745.5 in 2007 and 642.5 in 2006) and top mark for points per game (5.83 in 2007). Her 5.64 ppg in 2006 tied the former record held by Bibiana Candelas in 2005.

== National team ==
Kaczor has been in the Polish National Team program since 2000 and is a current member of the National Team. As a member of the Junior National Team, her squad finished third at the 2003 World Junior Championship and won the 2002 European Junior Championship.

Kaczor played with Poland at the 2008 Summer Olympics.
