= Katarzyna Mroczkowska =

Polish volleyball player (born 1980)

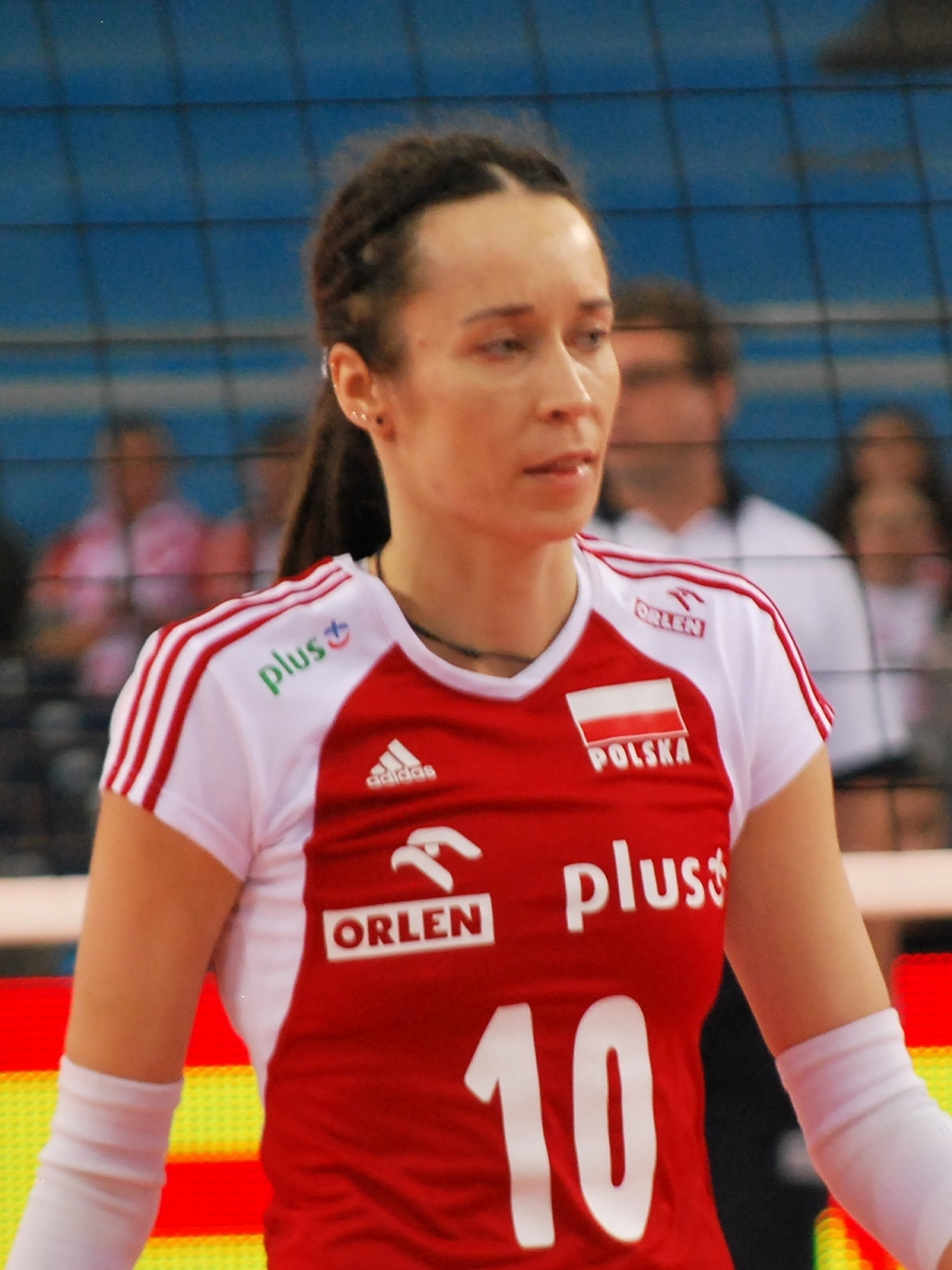
- Mroczkowska in 2014

Personal information
- Nationality: Polish
- Born: 30 December 1980 (age 45)
- Height: 1.81 m (5 ft 11 in)

Volleyball information
- Position: middle blocker
- Current club: Pałac Bydgoszcz
- Number: 1 (national team)

National team
2001-2002	Poland

Katarzyna Mroczkowska (born 30 December 1980) is a retired Polish volleyball player, who played as a middle blocker.

She was part of the Poland women's national volleyball team at the 2001 Women's European Volleyball Championship, and 2002 FIVB Volleyball Women's World Championship in Germany. On club level she played with Pałac Bydgoszcz.

== Clubs ==
- Pałac Bydgoszcz (2002)
