= Calisia Kalisz =

Polish sports club

Calisia Kalisz is a Polish multi-sports club based in Kalisz, most notable for its women's volleyball team, SSK Calisia Kalisz (formerly Winiary Kalisz), playing in the Liga Siatkówki Kobiet (Polish Women's Volleyball League), which folded in 2010. The other large section of the club is the athletics department.

The club also possesses several junior football teams, the senior men's team having folded halfway through the 2014/15 Third Division season.

== Honours ==
=== Women's Volleyball ===
- Polish Championship
  - 1st place
    - 1996/1997, 1997/1998, 2004/2005, 2006/2007
  - 2nd Place
    - 1995/1996, 1998/1999, 2003/2004
  - 3rd Place
    - 2000/2001, 2002/2003, 2005/2006, 2007/2008
- Polish Cup
  - 1995/1996, 1997/1998, 1998/1999, 2006/2007

=== Association football ===
- Polish Cup Semi-finals – 1955/56
- 5th place in Second Division – 1958/59

== Squad ==
=== Women's Volleyball ===
No.	Name and surname	Country	Position
1	Anita Chojnacka	Poland	Opposite hitter
2	Ewelina Toborek	Poland	Middle blocker
3	Anna Woźniakowska	Poland	Outside hitter
6	Olga Owczynnikowa	Poland	Setter
7	Magdalena Wawrzyniak	Poland	Opposite hitter
8	Katarzyna Wawrzyniak	Poland	Setter
10	Magdalena Godos	Poland	Setter
13	Daria Paszek	Poland	Opposite hitter
–	Marta Kuehn-Jarek	Poland	Libero

== See also ==
- Volleyball in Poland
- Sports in Poland
