= 2019 Montreux Volley Masters =

Women's volleyball tournament

Tournament details
- Host country: Switzerland
- Dates: 13–18 May
- Teams: 8
- Venue: 1 (in 1 host city)

Final positions
- Champions: Poland (1st title)

Tournament awards
- MVP: Malwina Smarzek (POL)

The 2019 Montreux Volley Masters was the 34th edition of the women's volleyball competition set in Montreux, Switzerland.

== Participating teams ==
Teams:

Pool A	Pool B
China; Germany; Japan; Poland	Italy (Defending champion); Switzerland; Thailand; Turkey

== Group stage ==
The first 2 teams of each group qualify for the final round.

- All times are Central European Summer Time (UTC+02:00).

=== Group A ===
Pos	Team	Pld	W	L	Pts	SW	SL	SR	SPW	SPL	SPR	Qualification
1	Poland	3	2	1	6	7	5	1.400	280	254	1.102	Semifinals
2	Japan	3	2	1	6	7	5	1.400	276	274	1.007	Semifinals
3	China	3	2	1	5	7	6	1.167	301	273	1.103	Classification round
4	Germany	3	0	3	1	4	9	0.444	254	310	0.819	Classification round

Date	Time		Score		Set 1	Set 2	Set 3	Set 4	Set 5	Total	Report
13 May	18:45	Japan	3–1	China	25–20	17–25	27–25	25–21		94–91	Report
14 May	16:30	Germany	2–3	China	21–25	9–25	26–24	25–22	9–15	90–111	Report
14 May	21:15	Poland	3–1	Japan	25–15	19–25	25–21	25–19		94–80	Report
15 May	16:30	China	3–1	Poland	22–25	25–17	25–22	27–25		99–89	Report
15 May	21:15	Japan	3–1	Germany	25–19	23–25	25–18	29–27		102–89	Report
16 May	18:45	Germany	1–3	Poland	14–25	25–22	18–25	18–25		75–97	Report

=== Group B ===
Pos	Team	Pld	W	L	Pts	SW	SL	SR	SPW	SPL	SPR	Qualification
1	Italy	3	2	1	6	7	5	1.400	269	252	1.067	Semifinals
2	Thailand	3	2	1	6	7	5	1.400	271	258	1.050	Semifinals
3	Turkey	3	2	1	6	7	5	1.400	285	278	1.025	Classification round
4	Switzerland	3	0	3	0	3	9	0.333	242	279	0.867	Classification round

Date	Time		Score		Set 1	Set 2	Set 3	Set 4	Set 5	Total	Report
13 May	16:30	Switzerland	1–3	Turkey	20–25	24–26	25–21	20–25		89–97	Report
13 May	21:15	Thailand	3–1	Italy	25–20	25–14	16–25	25–19		91–78	Report
14 May	18:45	Switzerland	1–3	Thailand	24–26	19–25	25–15	14–25		82–91	Report
15 May	18:45	Italy	3–1	Turkey	25–27	25–20	25–20	25–23		100–90	Report
16 May	16:30	Italy	3–1	Switzerland	25–17	25–16	16–25	25–13		91–71	Report
16 May	21:15	Turkey	3–1	Thailand	22–25	25–19	25–21	26–24		98–89	Report

== Classification round ==
Date	Time		Score		Set 1	Set 2	Set 3	Set 4	Set 5	Total	Report
18 May	12:30	China	1–3	Turkey	18–25	25–16	23–25	18–25		84–91	Report
17 May	16:30	Germany	3–1	Switzerland	21–25	25–19	25–15	25–17		96–76	Report

== Final round ==
Semifinal
17 May
Poland	3
Thailand	0
17 May
Italy	0
Japan	3

Final
18 May
Poland	3
Japan	1
Third place match
18 May
Thailand	0
Italy	3

=== Semifinal ===
Date	Time		Score		Set 1	Set 2	Set 3	Set 4	Set 5	Total	Report
17 May	18:45	Poland	3–0	Thailand	25–18	25–9	25–23			75–50	Report
17 May	21:15	Italy	0–3	Japan	21–25	14–25	16–25			51–75	Report

=== 3rd place ===
Date	Time		Score		Set 1	Set 2	Set 3	Set 4	Set 5	Total	Report
18 May	14:45	Thailand	0–3	Italy	20–25	18–25	14–25			52–75	Report

=== Final ===
Date	Time		Score		Set 1	Set 2	Set 3	Set 4	Set 5	Total	Report
18 May	17:15	Poland	3–1	Japan	25–15	22–25	25–17	26–24		98–81	Report

== Final standings ==
Rank	Team
1st place, gold medalist(s)	Poland
2nd place, silver medalist(s)	Japan
3rd place, bronze medalist(s)	Italy
4	Thailand
5	Turkey
6	China
7	Germany
8	Switzerland

== Awards ==
- Most valuable player
  Malwina Smarzek (POL)
- Best setter
  Nanami Seki (JPN)
- Best outside spikers
  Yurie Nabeya (JPN)
  Martyna Grajber (POL)
- Best middle blockers
  Agnieszka Kąkolewska (POL)
  Sarah Luisa Fahr (ITA)
- Best opposite spiker
  Malwina Smarzek (POL)
- Best libero
  Mako Kobata (JPN)
