= Yurie Nabeya =

Japanese volleyball player (born 1993)

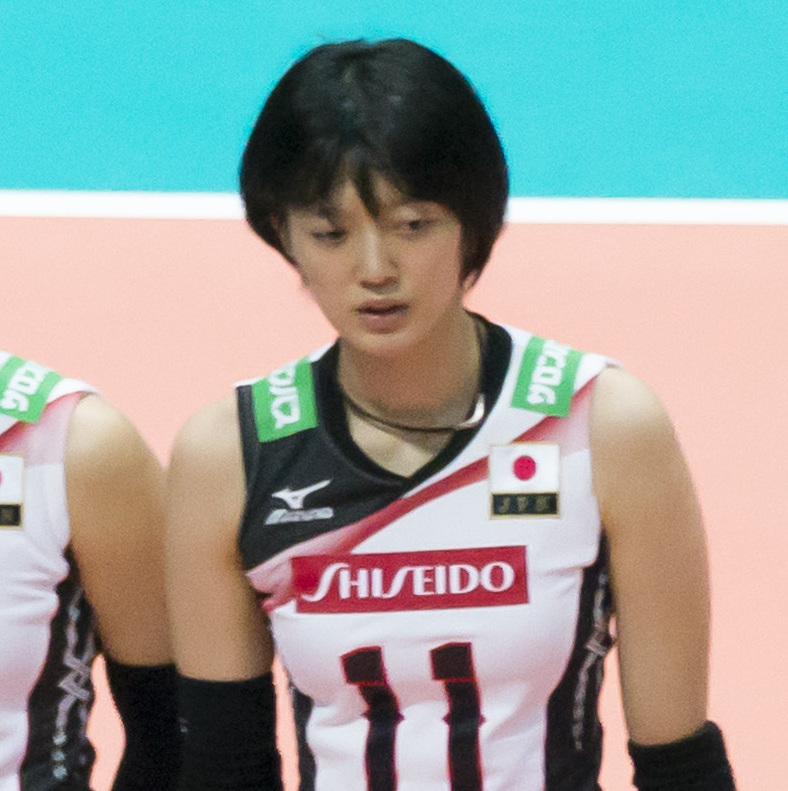
- Yurie Nabeya in 2017

Personal information
- Nationality: Japanese
- Born: 15 December 1993 (age 32) Kawasaki, Kanagawa, Japan
- Height: 176 cm (69 in)
- Weight: 58 kg (128 lb)
- Spike: 302 cm (119 in)
- Block: 288 cm (113 in)

Volleyball information
- Position: Outside hitter
- Number: 22 (national team)

Career
- Years: Team
- 2012-2021: Denso Airybees
- 2021-2023: PFU Blue Cats
- 2023-2025: Toyota Auto Body Queenseis

National team
- Years: Team
- 2015-2025t: Japan
Honours
Women's volleyball
Representing Japan
Montreux Volley Masters
Silver medal – second place	2019 Montreux	Team

Yurie Nabeya (鍋谷 友理枝, Nabeya Yurie; born 15 December 1993) is a Japanese former volleyball player. She played in the 2016 Summer Olympics.

== Life ==
She is part of the Japan women's national volleyball team. She participated at the 2015 FIVB Volleyball World Grand Prix, and the 2017 FIVB Volleyball World Grand Prix.

On club level she played for Toyota Auto Body Queenseis in 2023.

== Awards ==
=== Individual ===
- 2019 Montreux Volley Masters "Best outside spiker"
