= Ewelina Tobiasz =

Polish volleyball player (born 1994)

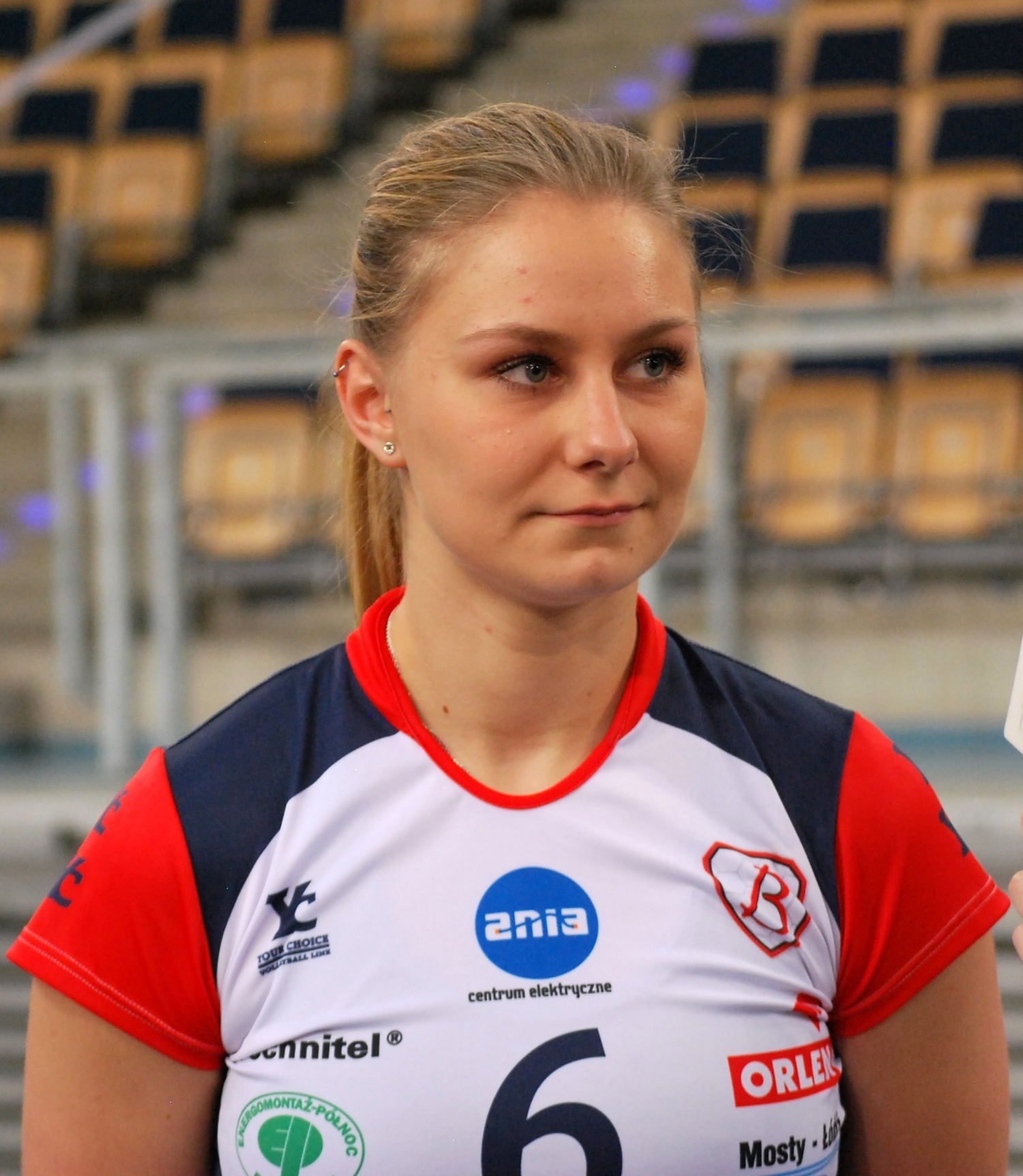

Personal information
- Nationality: Polish
- Born: 6 February 1994 (age 32)
- Height: 177 cm (70 in)
- Weight: 67 kg (148 lb)
- Spike: 293 cm (115 in)
- Block: 276 cm (109 in)

Volleyball information
- Number: 23 (national team)

Career
Years	Teams
2015	Budowlani Łódź

National team
2015	Poland

Ewelina Tobiasz (born 6 February 1994) is a Polish volleyball player. She is part of the Poland women's national volleyball team.

She participated in the 2015 FIVB Volleyball World Grand Prix, and in the 2016 FIVB Volleyball World Grand Prix.

On club level she played for Budowlani Łódź
