= Gabriela Polańska =

Polish volleyball player (born 1988)

Gabriela Polanska
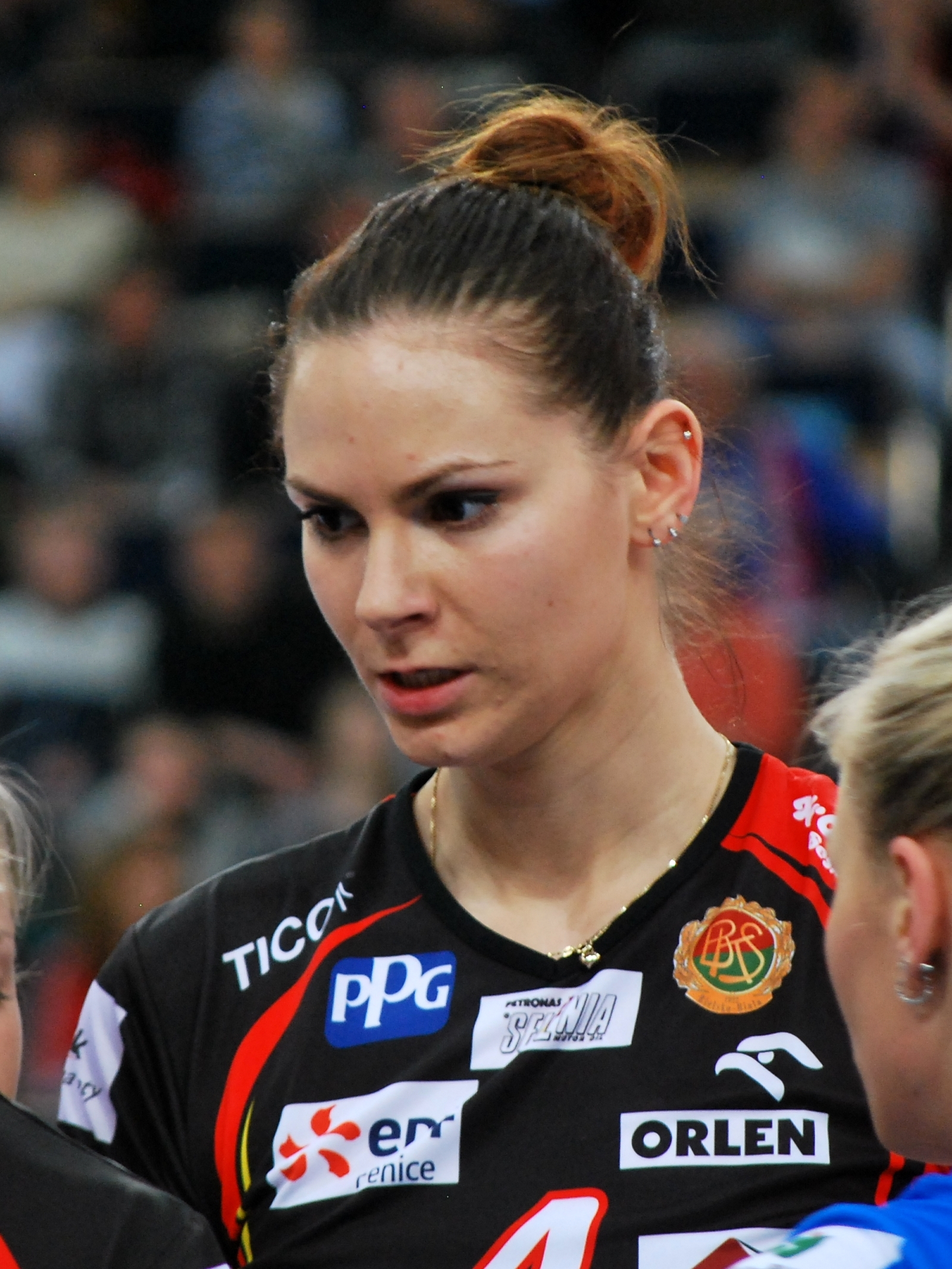

Personal information
- Nickname: Gabi
- Nationality: Polish
- Born: 27 November 1988 (age 37)
- Height: 202 cm (6 ft 8 in)
- Weight: 77 kg (170 lb)
- Spike: 308 cm (121 in)
- Block: 299 cm (118 in)

Volleyball information
- Current club: Budowlani Łódź
- Number: 7 (national team)

Career
Years	Teams
2015	Budowlani Łódź

National team
2008-	Poland

Gabriela Polanska née Wojtowicz (born 27 November 1988) is a Polish volleyball player. She is part of the Poland women's national volleyball team.

She participated in the 2015 FIVB Volleyball World Grand Prix, and 2018 FIVB Volleyball Women's Nations League. On club level she played for Budowlani Łódź in 2015.
