= BKS Bielsko-Biała =

BKS Profi Credit Bielsko-Biała
- Full name: Bialski Klub Sportowy Spółka Akcyjna
- Short name: BKS
- Founded: 1951
- Ground: BKS Stal Hall, Bielsko-Biała, Poland (Capacity: 1,400)
- Chairman: Andrzej Pyć
- Head coach: Tore Aleksandersen
- League: TAURON Liga
- 2020–21: 6th
- Website: Club home page

Uniforms
Home	Away

BKS Bielsko-Biała is the women's volleyball department of Polish sports club BKS Stal Bielsko-Biała based in Bielsko-Biała and plays in the Orlen Liga.

== Previous names ==
Due to sponsorship, the club have competed under the following names:

- BKS Stal Bielsko-Biała (1951–2006)
- BKS Aluprof Bielsko-Biała (2006–2015)
- BKS Aluprof Profi Credit Bielsko-Biała (2015–2016)
- BKS Profi Credit Bielsko-Biała (2016–2019)
- BKS Stal Bielsko-Biała (2019-2020)
- BKS BOSTIK Bielsko-Biała (2020-2023)
- BKS BOSTIK ZGO Bielsko-Biała (2023-present)

== History ==
The sports club Bialski Klub Sportowy was established in 1922 and through the years had many different sports departments (today only the men's football and the later founded women's volleyball are still active). All activities were suspended during World War II and when the club resumed its activities after the war, with sports facility reconstruction efforts, it was under the patronage of several industries, most notably the Bielska Fabryka Maszyn Włókienniczych (Bielsko Sewing Machine factory or in short "Befama"), and as sports associations were under supervision of trade unions, the club was renamed Bialski Klub Sportowy Stal (Bialski Sports Club Steel). It was under this set up that in 1951 the women's volleyball department was created. It has various teams (girls, youth, second and first senior team) playing across many divisions in the Polish leagues. The main senior team reached the first division three years after its foundation and in the 1954–55 season won the Polish Cup for the first time, with a second Cup title arriving in 1978–79. During the late 1980s the club achieved success winning the Polish Championships for four consecutive years (1987–88, 1988–89, 1989–90, 1990–91) and three consecutive Polish Cups (1987–88, 1988–89, 1989–90). In the period that followed, the club won another four Championships (1995–96, 2002–03, 2003–04, 2009–10), three Cups (2003–04, 2005–06, 2008–09) and two Polish Super Cups (2006, 2010).

In 2011 the club became a corporation and changed its name to Bialski Klub Sportowy Spółka Akcyjna (BSK S.A.).

== Honours ==
=== National competitions ===
- Polish Championship: 8

1987–88, 1988–89, 1989–90, 1990–91, 1995–96, 2002–03, 2003–04, 2009–10

- Polish Cup: 8

1954–55, 1978–79, 1987–88, 1988–89, 1989–90, 2003–04, 2005–06, 2008–09

- Polish Super Cup: 2

2006, 2010

== Team ==
2016–2017 squad, as per March 2017.

Number	Player	Position	Height (m)	Weight (kg)	Birth date
1	(Poland) Natalia Perlińska	Middle blocker	1.90	73	4 June 1988 (age 38)
2	(Poland) Joanna Staniucha-Szczurek	Outside hitter	1.84	73	5 December 1981 (age 44)
3	(Poland) Mariola Wojtowicz	Libero	1.64	60	4 January 1980 (age 46)
4	(Poland) Aleksandra Wańczyk	Opposite	1.93	81	1 January 1996 (age 30)
6	(Slovakia) Jaroslava Pencová	Middle blocker	1.90	86	24 June 1990 (age 36)
7	(Poland) Natalia Skrzypkowska	Outside hitter	1.80	68	23 February 1989 (age 37)
8	(Poland) Aleksandra Pasznik	Setter	1.83	63	26 February 1990 (age 36)
9	(United States) Erica Handley	Setter	1.83	68	22 April 1995 (age 31)
11	(Czech Republic) Soňa Mikysková	Opposite	1.89	79	2 May 1989 (age 37)
12	(Poland) Aleksandra Trojan	Middle blocker	1.96	68	6 June 1991 (age 35)
13	(Germany) Magdalena Gryka	Setter	1.79	69	28 March 1994 (age 32)
14	(Poland) Ewelina Brzezińska	Outside hitter	1.83	73	26 January 1988 (age 38)
15	(Poland) Kornelia Moskwa	Middle blocker	1.86	80	30 October 1996 (age 29)
16	(Poland) Emilia Mucha	Outside hitter	1.86	73	7 December 1993 (age 32)
17	(Poland) Aneta Wilczek	Libero	1.76	63	11 December 1997 (age 28)
18	(Poland) Wiktoria Szumera	Outside hitter	1.82	67	28 December 1999 (age 26)
