= Pałac Bydgoszcz =

Polish women's volleyball club

Metalkas Pałac Bydgoszcz
- Full name: Klub Sportowy Pałac Bydgoszcz Spółka Akcyjna
- Short name: Pałac
- Nickname: Pałacanki
- Founded: 1982
- Ground: Hala Łuczniczka, Bydgoszcz, Poland (Capacity: 6,082)
- Chairman: Piotr Makowski
- Head coach: Jakub Tęcza
- Captain: Magdalena Mazurek
- League: TAURON Liga
- 2022–23: 8th
- Website: Club home page

Uniforms
| Home | Away |

Pałac Bydgoszcz is a Polish women's volleyball club based in Bydgoszcz, currently playing in TAURON Liga - the highest level of women's volleyball played in Poland.

== Previous names ==
Due to sponsorship, the club has competed under the following names:

- Pałac Bydgoszcz (1982–1993)
- Gryf Bydgoszcz (1993–1994)
- Gryf Pałac Bydgoszcz (1994–1995)
- Pałac Centrostal Bydgoszcz (1995–1998)
- Centrostal Eltra Bydgoszcz (1998–1999)
- Centrostal AMT Bydgoszcz (1999–2000)
- Bank Pocztowy Centrostal Bydgoszcz (2000–2002)
- Bank Pocztowy GCB Adriana Gazeta Pomorska Bydgoszcz (2002–2003)
- GCB Adriana Gazeta Pomorska Bydgoszcz (2003–2004)
- Centrostal Adriana Gazeta Pomorska Bydgoszcz (2004–2005)
- Centrostal Focus Park Bydgoszcz (2005–2007)
- GCB Centrostal Bydgoszcz (2007–2011)
- Pałac Bydgoszcz (2011–2018)
- Bank Pocztowy Pałac Bydgoszcz (2018–2020)
- Polskie Przetwory Pałac Bydgoszcz (2020–2022)
- OnlyBio Pałac Bydgoszcz (2022–2023)
- Metalkas Pałac Bydgoszcz (2023–present)

== History ==
The club was created in 1982 at the Pałac Młodzieży (Palace of the Youth) in Bydgoszcz and was named Klub Sportowy (KS) Pałac. It has various youth teams and a senior team competing in the Polish national leagues. The senior team is playing in the Polish highest league since the 1992–93 season. The team (playing in the past under various names due to sponsorship reasons) has finished amongst the top three of the highest league, including once champions, for five times. The club is also noted for its very good work with the youth, carrying on practices for all youth-age player groups, starting from the youngest. Among other honours its junior team has won the national junior competitions championship for three times (recently in the 2009–10 season). Several players of the Polish national team (senior, academic and junior) have played or are currently playing in the club teams, several of them have been or are the club wards.

== Honours ==
=== National competitions ===
- Polish Championship: 1
  1992–93
- Polish Cup: 3
  1991–92, 2000–01, 2004–05
- Polish Super Cup: 1
  2005

== Team ==
Season 2016–2017, as of February 2017.

| Number | Player | Position | Height (m) | Weight (kg) | Birth date |
|---|---|---|---|---|---|
| 3 | (Poland) Paulina Bałdyga | Setter | 1.73 | 68 | 24 July 1996 (age 30) |
| 5 | (Poland) Anna Lewandowska | Middle hitter | 1.87 | 80 | 2 December 1995 (age 30) |
| 6 | (Poland) Aleksandra Justka | Libero | 1.68 | 60 | 13 May 2002 (age 24) |
| 7 | (Poland) Magdalena Mazurek | Setter | 1.82 | 71 | 12 September 1983 (age 42) |
| 8 | (Poland) Ewelina Żurowska | Przyjmująca | 1.78 | 65 | 10 August 1992 (age 33) |
| 9 | (Poland) Pola Nowakowska | Przyjmująca | 1.80 | 75 | 30 January 1996 (age 30) |
| 10 | (Poland) Kamila Kobus | Middle hitter | 1.86 | 76 | 29 June 1999 (age 27) |
| 12 | (Poland) Monika Gałkowska | Attacker | 1.88 | 77 | 6 April 1996 (age 30) |
| 13 | (Poland) Kinga Rózyńska | Middle hitter | 1.90 | 78 | 12 July 1998 (age 28) |
| 15 | (Poland) Dominika Milun | Przyjmująca | 1.80 | 65 | 18 March 2005 (age 21) |
| 16 | (Poland) Agata Witkowska | Libero | 1.70 | 67 | 19 August 1989 (age 36) |
| 22 | (Poland) Koleta Łyszkiewicz | Przyjmująca | 1.93 | 83 | 22 January 1993 (age 33) |
