= Budowlani Łódź (volleyball) =

PGE Budowlani Łódź
- Full name: Budowlani Łódź Sportowa Spółka Akcyjna
- Short name: Budowlani Łódź
- Nickname: Budowlane
- Founded: 2006
- Ground: Łódź Sport Arena, Łódź, Poland (Capacity: 3,000)
- Chairman: Marcin Chudzik
- Head coach: Maciej Biernat
- League: Tauron Liga Kobiet
- 2025–26: 1st
- Website: Club home page

Uniforms
Home	Away

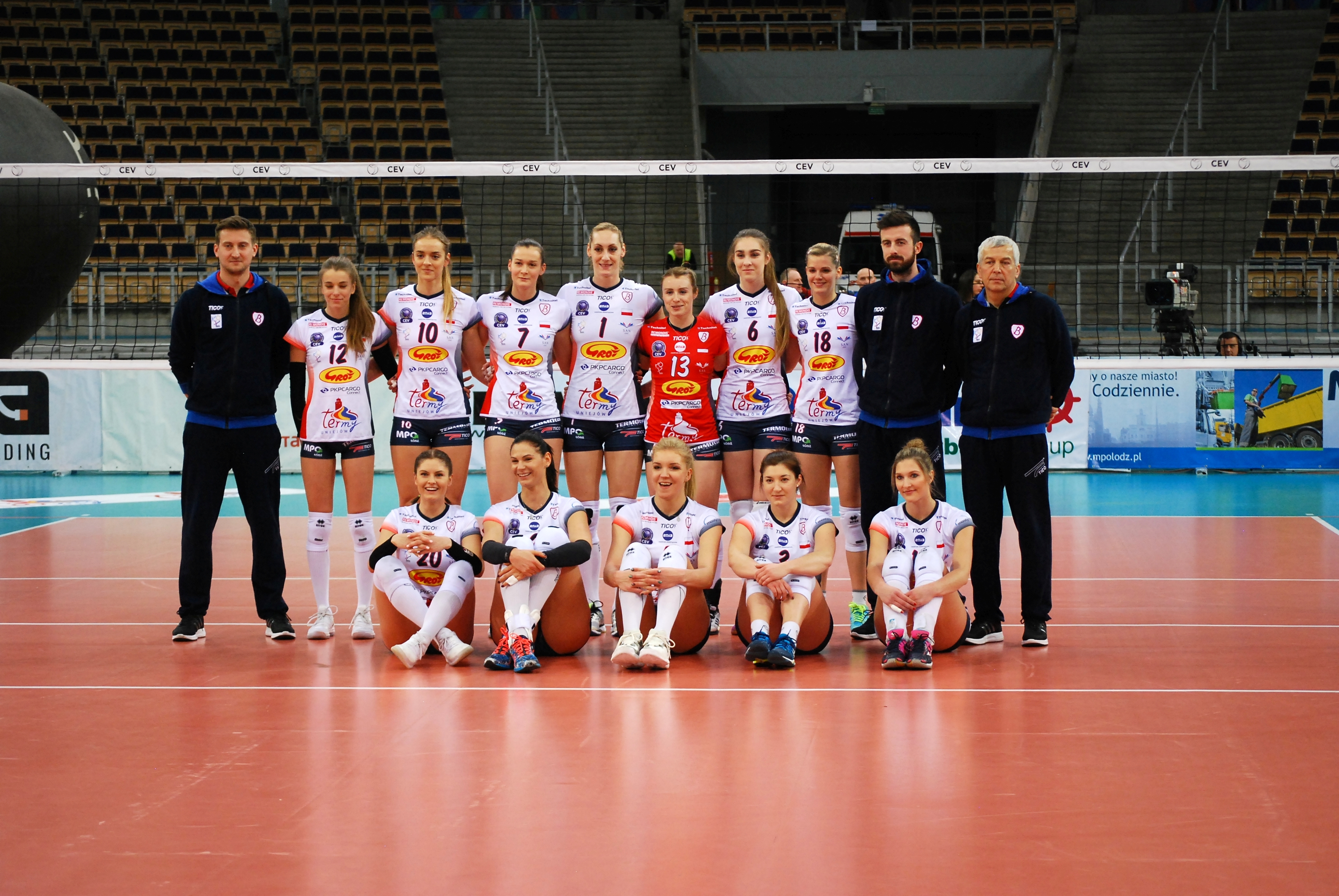
Budowlani Łódź in 2017

Budowlani Łódź, is the women's volleyball department of Polish sports club Budowlani Łódź based in the city of Łódź and plays in the Liga Siatkówki Kobiet.

== Previous names ==
Due to sponsorship, the club have competed under the following names:

- Organika Budowlani Łódź (2006–2011)
- Budowlani Łódź (2011–2013)
- Beef Master Budowlani Łódź (2013–2014)
- Budowlani Łódź (2014–2016)
- Grot Budowlani Łódź (2016–2024)
- PGE Grot Budowlani Łódź (2024–2025)
- PGE Budowlani Łódź (since 2025)

== History ==
Budowlani Łódź a sports club based in Łódź, first created a volleyball department in the 1970s, with the team reaching the division II at best. The club decided to focus on other sports and in the 1980s dissolved the volleyball department. Two decades later, in 2005 the club set up a project to relaunch its volleyball department with the goal of reaching the Polish highest league in 3 years. The team was created for the 2006–07 season and started playing in the third division. A season later it competed in the second division, reaching the first division in 2009. The club won its first major title by claiming the 2009–10 Polish Cup.

Since 2010, the club has also participated in European competitions.

== Honours ==
=== National competitions ===
- Polish Women's Volleyball League
  - Champions (1): 2026
  - Runners-up (1): 2017, 2019
- Polish Cup
  - Winners (3): 2010, 2018, 2026
  - Runners-up (2): 2017, 2021
- Polish Super Cup
  - Winners (2): 2017, 2018
  - Runners-up (1): 2010

== Team ==
Season 2018–2019, as of November 2018.

Number	Player	Position	Height (m)	Weight (kg)	Birth date
1	(Poland) Maria Stenzel	Libero	1.68	54	25 November 1998 (age 27)
2	(Poland) Gabriela Polańska	Middle blocker	2.02	83	27 November 1988 (age 37)
5	(Poland) Małgorzata Śmieszek	Middle blocker	1.87	75	11 July 1996 (age 30)
6	(Serbia) Jovana Brakočević	Opposite	1.96	77	5 March 1988 (age 38)
7	(Poland) Julia Twardowska	Outside hitter	1.87	78	4 May 1995 (age 31)
9	(Slovakia) Jaroslava Pencová	Middle blocker	1.91	79	24 June 1990 (age 36)
10	(Poland) Justyna Kędziora	Outside hitter	1.75		29 September 2000 (age 25)
11	(Poland) Agata Babicz	Outside hitter	1.71	62	16 March 1986 (age 40)
12	(Netherlands) Femke Stoltenborg	Setter	1.89	73	30 July 1991 (age 35)
16	(Poland) Ewelina Tobiasz	Setter	1.78	67	6 February 1994 (age 32)
17	(Poland) Oliwia Urban	Outside hitter	1.82	65	21 November 1996 (age 29)
18	(Poland) Justyna Lysiak	Libero	1.71	62	20 January 1999 (age 27)
22	(Poland) Koleta Łyszkiewicz	Outside hitter/Opposite	1.93	79	22 January 1993 (age 33)
Coach: (Poland) Błażej Krzyształowicz

== Notable players ==
- (Poland) Małgorzata Niemczyk (2007–2010)
- (Ukraine) (Poland) Yuliya Shelukhina (2008–2011)
- (Poland) Katarzyna Zaroślińska (2009–2011)
- (Poland) Karolina Kosek (2009–2011)
- (Brazil) Luana de Paula (2009–2012)
- (United States) Kathleen Olsovsky (2010)
- (Poland) Joanna Mirek (2010–2012)
- (Dominican Republic) Karla Echenique (2011)
- (Croatia) Ana Grbac (2011–2012)
- (Croatia) Matea Ikic (2011–2012)
- (Belgium) Hélène Rousseaux (2011–2012)
- (United States) Courtney Thompson (2012–2013)
- (Poland) Agata Witkowska (2012–2014, 2017–2018)
- (Poland) Sylwia Pycia (2012–2017)
- (Poland) Magdalena Śliwa (2013–2015)
- (Poland) Martyna Grajber (2013–2018)
- (Croatia) Sanja Popović (2014–2015)
- (Belgium) Valérie Courtois (2014–2015)
- (Poland) Ewelina Brzezińska (2014–2016)
- (Romania) Daiana Mureșan (2015–2016)
- (Germany) Heike Beier (2015–2017)
- (Czech Republic) Pavla Vincourová (2015–2018)
- (Poland) Paulina Maj–Erwardt (2016–2017)
- (Belgium) Kaja Grobelna (2016–2018)
