= Aleksandra Sikorska =

Polish volleyball player (born 1993)

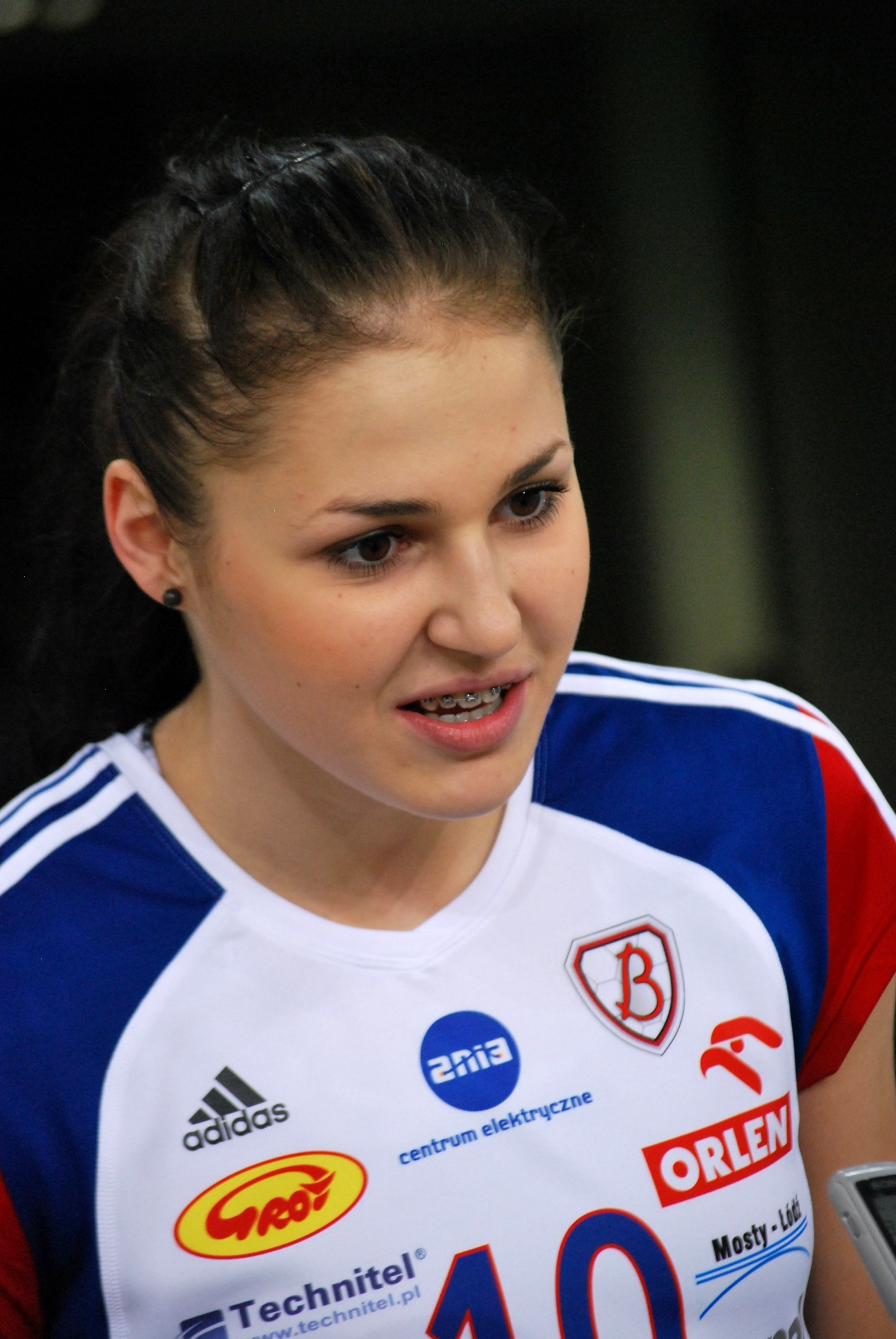

Personal information
- Nationality: Polish
- Born: 28 April 1993 (age 33); Warsaw, Poland
- Height: 185 cm (73 in)
- Weight: 67 kg (148 lb)
- Spike: 306 cm (120 in)
- Block: 286 cm (113 in)

Volleyball information
- Number: 21 (national team)

Career
Years	Teams
2014	Budowlani

National team
2014	Poland

Aleksandra Sikorska (born 28 April 1993) is a Polish volleyball player. She is part of the Poland women's national volleyball team.

She participated in the 2015 FIVB Volleyball World Grand Prix. On club level she played for Budowlani in 2014.
