= Polish Women's Volleyball Cup =

Volleyball in Poland

- Sport: Volleyball
- Founded: 1932
- Administrator: PZPS
- Country: Poland
- Continent: Europe
- Most recent champion: KS DevelopRes Rzeszów (2nd title)
- Most titles: Chemik Police (10 titles)
- Website: https://www.pzps.pl/pl/

The Polish Women's Volleyball Cup is a women's volleyball competition contested every year under the rule of the Polish Volleyball Federation (PZPS) and it considered one of the oldest women's Volleyball cup around the world since it manifested in 1932.

== Winners list ==
Years	Winners	Score	Runners-up
1932	AZS Warsaw		HKS Łódź
1933	AZS Warsaw		YMCA Kraków
1934	AZS Warsaw		HKS Łódź
1935	AZS Warsaw		AZS Lwów
1936	AZS Warsaw		KPW Olsza Kraków
1937–1949 : Competition Not Disputed
1950	Spójnia Marymont Warsaw		Unia Chemia Łódź
1951	Spójnia Warsaw		Unia Łódź
1952	Kolejarz Gdańsk		Unia Łódź
1953	Kolejarz Gdańsk		Spójnia Warsaw
1954	Kolejarz Gdańsk		Spójnia Warsaw
1955	Stal Bielsko-Biała		Sparta Warsaw
1956–1959 : Competition Not Disputed
1960	Wisła Kraków		Start Gdynia
1961	Wisła Kraków		Gwardia Wrocław
1962–1969 : Competition Not Disputed
1970	Start Łódź		AZS-AWF Warsaw
1971	Start Łódź		Płomień Milowice
1972	Start Łódź		AZS-AWF Warsaw
1973	Kolejarz Katowice		Płomień Milowice
1974	Start Łódź		Kolejarz Katowice
1975	Zawisza Sulechów		Start Łódź
1976	ŁKS Łódź		Siarka Tarnobrzeg
1977	Kolejarz Katowice		BKS Stal Bielsko-Biała
1978	Start Łódź		Kolejarz Katowice
1979	BKS Stal Bielsko-Biała		Start Łódź
1980 : Competition Not Disputed
1981	Czarni Słupsk		Kolejarz Katowice
1982	ŁKS Łódź		Płomień Sosnowiec
1983	Start Łódź		Czarni Słupsk
1984	Czarni Słupsk		Wisła Kraków
1985	Czarni Słupsk		Płomień Sosnowiec
1986	ŁKS Łódź		Czarni Słupsk
1987	Czarni Słupsk		BKS Stal Bielsko-Biała
1988	BKS Stal Bielsko-Biała		Czarni Słupsk
1989	BKS Stal Bielsko-Biała		Płomień Sosnowiec
1990	BKS Stal Bielsko-Biała		Płomień Sosnowiec
1991	Czarni Słupsk		BKS Stal Bielsko-Biała
1992	Pałac Polfrost Bydgoszcz		Czarni Słupsk
1993	Chemik Police		Pałac Samsung Bydgoszcz
1994	Chemik Police		BKS Stal Bielsko-Biała
1995	Chemik Police		BKS Stal Bielsko-Biała
1996	Augusto Kalisz		Chemik Police
1997	Dick Black Andrychów		BKS Stal Bielsko-Biała
1998	Augusto Kalisz		BKS Stal Bielsko-Biała
1999	Augusto Kalisz		Melnox Autopart Lobo Mielec
2000	PTPS Nafta Piła		Melnox Autopart Lobo Mielec
2001	Centrostal Bydgoszcz		BKS Stal Bielsko-Biała
2002	PTPS Nafta-Gaz Piła	3 - 2 (25-21, 25–17, 23–25, 20–25, 15–5)	BKS Stal Bielsko-Biała
2003	PTPS Nafta-Gaz Piła	3 - 0 (25-20, 26–24, 25–15)	Gwardia Wrocław
2004	BKS Stal Bielsko-Biała	3 - 0 (25-19, 25–16, 25–19)	Gwardia Wrocław
2005	Centrostal Bydgoszcz	3 - 1 (25-23, 21–25, 25–16, 25–22)	Winiary Kalisz
2006	BKS Stal Bielsko-Biała	3 - 0 (25-23, 25–21, 25–18)	PTPS Nafta-Gaz Piła
2007	Winiary Kalisz	3 - 2 (16-25, 21–25, 25–22, 25–22, 15–8)	BKS Aluprof Bielsko-Biała
2008	PTPS Farmutil Piła	3 - 0 (25-23, 25–23, 25–17)	Winiary-Bakalland Kalisz
2009	BKS Aluprof Bielsko-Biała	3 - 0 (25-15, 25–21, 25–20)	Muszynianka Fakro Muszyna
2010	Organika Budowlani Łódź	3 - 1 (25-22, 25–20, 22–25, 25–20)	Bank BPS Muszynianka Fakro Muszyna
2011	Bank BPS Muszynianka Fakro Muszyna	3 - 2 (23-25, 25–22, 28–30, 25–23, 15–9)	BKS Aluprof Bielsko-Biała
2012	Tauron MKS Dąbrowa Górnicza	3 - 1 (20-25, 25–18, 25–20, 26–24)	Atom Trefl Sopot
2013	Tauron MKS Dąbrowa Górnicza	3 - 2 (26-24, 25–20, 21–25, 23–25, 17–15)	Atom Trefl Sopot
2014	KPS Chemik Police	3 - 0 (25-15, 27–25, 25–17)	Polski Cukier Muszynianka Fakro Bank BPS Muszyna
2015	PGE Atom Trefl Sopot	3 - 2 (17-25, 25–18, 25–10, 19–25, 15–12)	KPS Chemik Police
2016	KPS Chemik Police	3 - 1 (19-25, 25–13, 25–21, 26–24)	PGE Atom Trefl Sopot
2017	KPS Chemik Police	3 - 0 (25-23, 25–16, 25–16)	Grot Budowlani Łódź
2018	Grot Budowlani Łódź	3 - 0 (25-20, 25–17, 25–20)	ŁKS Commercecon Łódź
2019	KPS Chemik Police	3 - 0 (25-23, 25–21, 25–22)	Developres SkyRes Rzeszów
2020	Grupa Azoty Chemik Police	3 - 2 (21-25, 25–20, 19–25, 25–23, 15–13)	Developres SkyRes Rzeszów
2021	Grupa Azoty Chemik Police	3 - 1 (23-25, 25–21, 25–18, 25–18)	Grot Budowlani Łódź
2022	Developres Bella Dolina Rzeszów	3 - 0 (25-23, 25–19, 25–18)	IŁ Capital Legionovia Legionowo
2023	Grupa Azoty Chemik Police	3 - 2 (21-25, 23–25, 25–22, 25–15, 15-12)	ŁKS Commercecon Łódź
2024	BKS Bostik ZGO Bielsko-Biała	3 - 2 (20-25, 26–24, 25–23, 12–25, 15-12)	ŁKS Commercecon Łódź
2025	KS DevelopRes Rzeszów	3 - 0 (32-30, 25–20, 25–18)	ŁKS Commercecon Łódź

== Titles by club ==
rk.	Club	Titles	City	Years won
1	KPS Chemik Police	10	Police	1993, 1994, 1995, 2014, 2016, 2017, 2019, 2020, 2021, 2023
2	BKS Stal Bielsko-Biała	9	Bielsko-Biała	1955, 1979, 1988, 1989, 1990, 2004, 2006, 2009, 2024
3	Start Łódź	6	Łódź	1970, 1971, 1972, 1974, 1978, 1983
4	AZS Warsaw	5	Warsaw	1932, 1933, 1934, 1935, 1936
=	Czarni Słupsk	5	Słupsk	1981, 1984, 1985, 1987, 1991
6	SSK Calisia Kalisz	4	Kalisz	1996, 1998, 1999, 2007
=	PTPS Piła	4	Piła	2000, 2002, 2003, 2008
8	Gedania Gdańsk	3	Gdańsk	1952, 1953, 1954
=	ŁKS Łódź	3	Łódź	1976, 1982, 1986
=	KS Pałac Bydgoszcz	3	Bydgoszcz	1992, 2001, 2005
11	Spójnia Warsaw	2	Warsaw	1950, 1951
=	Wisła Kraków	2	Kraków	1960, 1961
=	Kolejarz Katowice	2	Katowice	1973, 1977
=	Budowlani Łódź	2	Łódź	2010, 2018
=	MKS Dąbrowa Górnicza	2	Dąbrowa Górnicza	2012, 2013
=	KS DevelopRes Rzeszów	2	Rzeszów	2022, 2025
17	Zawisza Sulechów	1	Sulechów	1975
=	Dick Black Andrychów	1	Andrychów	1997
=	Muszynianka Muszyna	1	Muszyna	2011
=	Atom Trefl Sopot	1	Sopot	2015
