= KS Developres Rzeszów =

Polish women's volleyball club

Developres Rzeszów
- Full name: KS Developres Rzeszów S.A.
- Nickname: Rysice
- Founded: 2012; 14 years ago
- Ground: Hala Podpromie, Rzeszów, Poland (Capacity: 4,304)
- Head coach: Jelena Blagojević
- League: TAURON Liga
- 2025–26: 2nd
- Website: Club home page

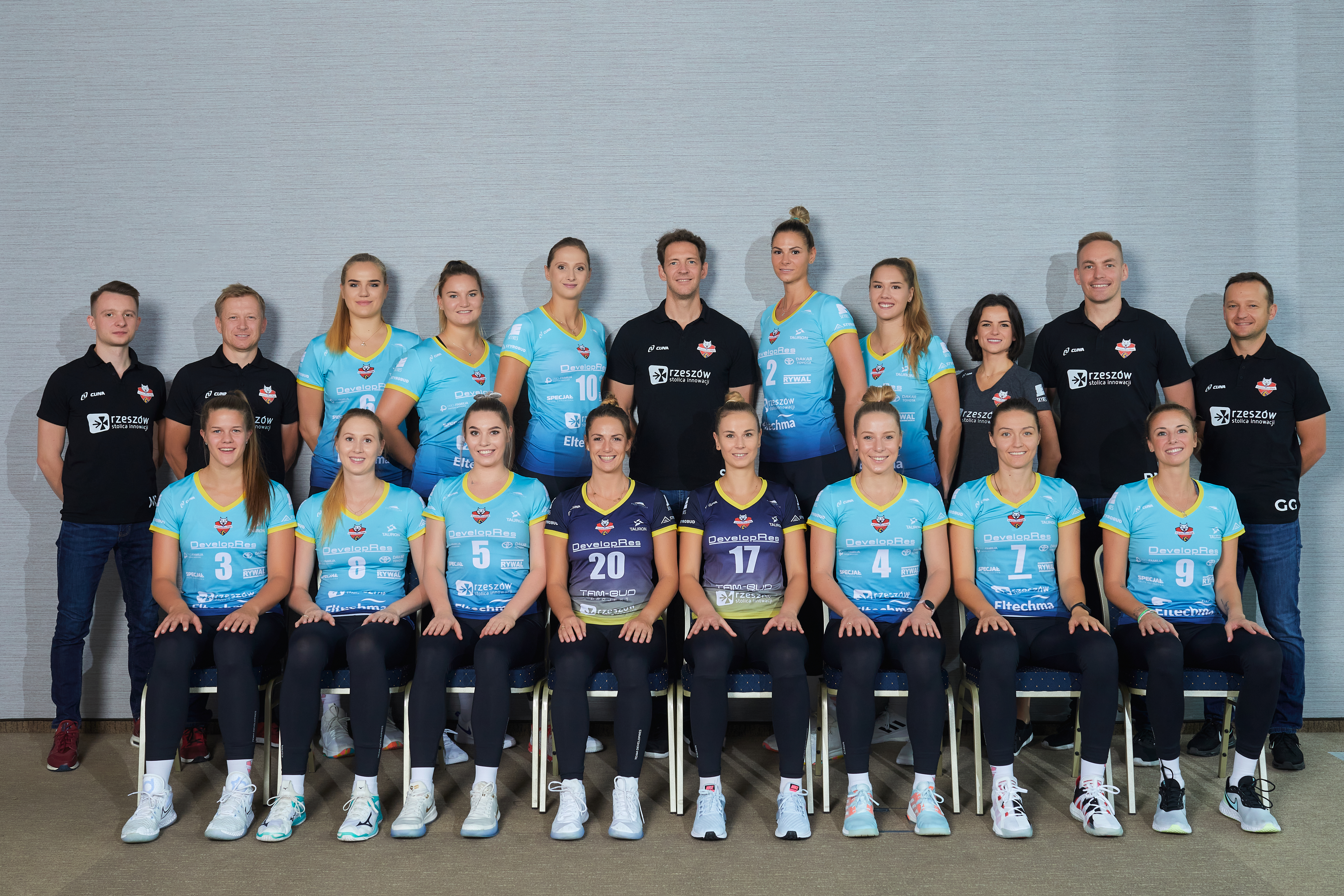
Developres Rzeszów in 2020-2021 season

KS Developres Rzeszów is a Polish women's volleyball club based in Rzeszów and playing in the Polish Women's Volleyball League.

The team won its first league title in 2025. They have also won the Polish Cup twice, in 2022 and 2025.

== History ==
KS Developres Rzeszów was founded in 2012. For the 2023–24 season, the team changed its name to PGE Rysice Rzeszów, but then it returned to the previous name in the following season.
