= Pavla Šmídová =

Czech volleyball player (born 1992)

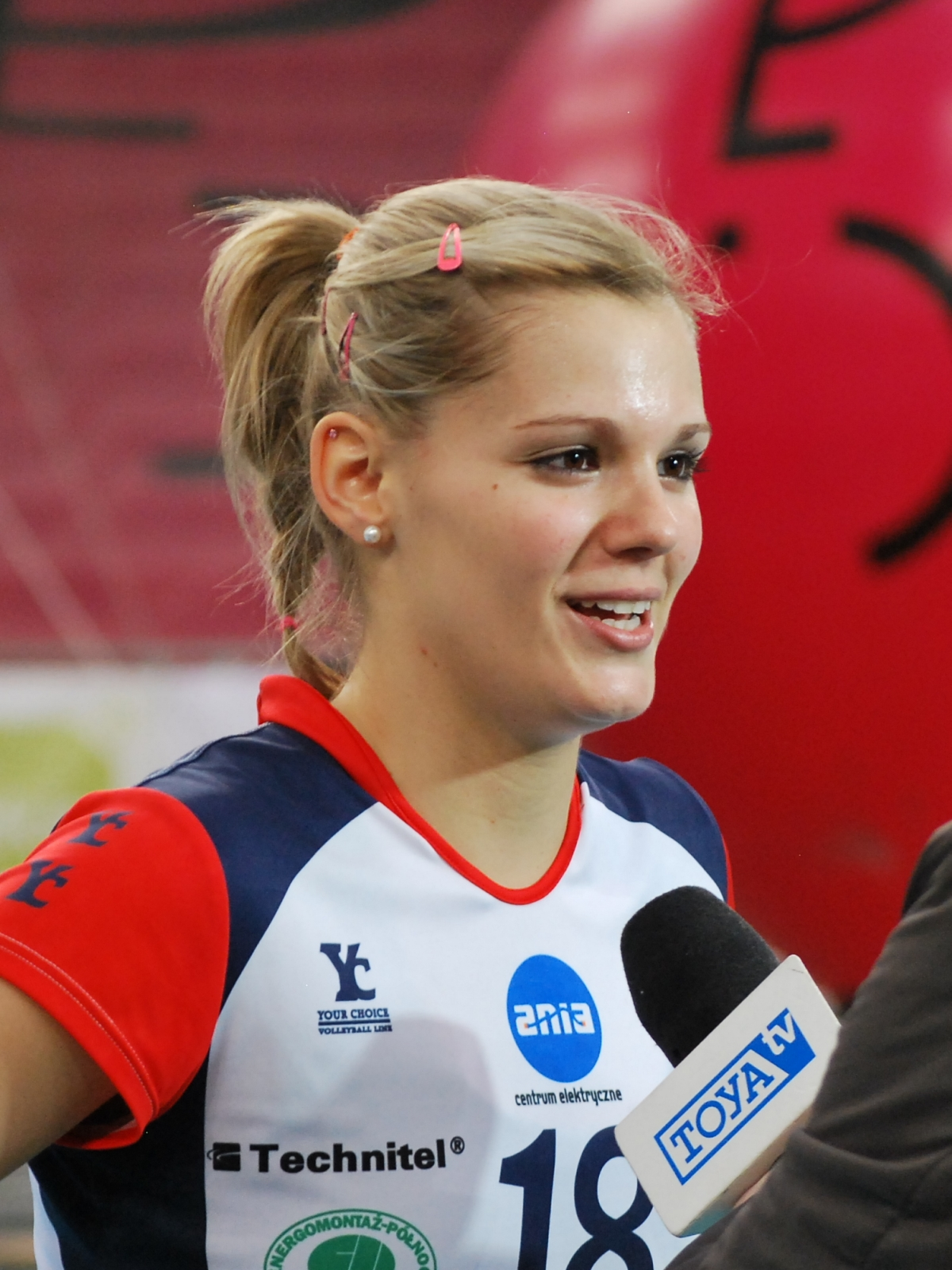

Personal information
- Nationality: Czech
- Born: 12 November 1992 (age 33); Brno, Czechoslovakia
- Height: 1.80 m (5 ft 11 in)
- Weight: 62 kg (137 lb)
- Spike: 303 cm (119 in)
- Block: 292 cm (115 in)

Volleyball information
- Position: setter
- Number: 18

Career
Years	Teams
2015	(Poland) Budowlani Łódź

National team
2010	Czech Republic

Pavla Šmídová, née Vincourová (born 12 November 1992) is a Czech female volleyball player. She was part of the Czech Republic women's national volleyball team.

She participated in the 2010 FIVB Volleyball Women's World Championship, and in the 2014 FIVB Volleyball World Grand Prix. She played with Budowlani Łódź.

== Clubs ==
- (Czech Republic) VK DDM Brno (2005–2007)
- (Czech Republic) VK Královo Pole Brno (2007–2012)
- (Czech Republic) VK AGEL Prostějov (2012–2014)
- (Italy) Pallavolo Scandicci (2014–2015)
- (Poland) Budowlani Łódź (2015–2016)
