= Volleyball in Poland =

Volleyball is one of the most popular sports in Poland. The men's national team is ranked first and the women's team is ranked fourth in the FIVB World Rankings. Both teams have had much success in international competitions.

- Tauron Liga
- Tauron 1. Liga (men's volleyball)
- Tauron Liga Kobiet
- I Liga (women's volleyball)
- Polish Men's Volleyball Cup
- Polish Men's Volleyball SuperCup
- Polish Women's Volleyball Cup
- Poland men's national volleyball team
- Poland women's national volleyball team

== See also ==
- Sports in Poland
