= KPSK Stal Mielec =

Klub Piłki Siatkowej Kobiet Stal Mielec is a Polish women's volleyball team, based in Mielec, playing in the Polish Women's Volleyball League.

== Current players ==
Number	Name	Nationality	Year of birth	Height in cm
1	Paulina Peret	POL	1989	167
2	Iwona Niedźwiecka	POL	1982	185
5	Karolina Olczyk	POL	1980	173
6	Marta Łukaszewska	POL	1982	184
7	Magdalena Banecka	POL	1980	173
8	Dorota Wilk	POL	1988	177
9	Ewelina Dązbłaż	POL	1981	183
10	Paulina Dutkiewicz	POL	1986	193
11	Agata Wilk	POL	1986	170
12	Dorota Burdzel	POL	1978	182
13	Małgorzata Skorupa	POL	1984	183

== Trainers ==
- Roman Murdza
- Maciej Banecki

== See also ==
- Volleyball in Poland
- Sports in Poland
