= Polish Women's Volleyball League =

Highest-level women's volleyball league in Poland

- Current season, competition or edition: 2026–27 Tauron Liga Kobiet
- Sport: Volleyball
- Founded: 17 August 2005; 21 years ago
- Administrator: PLS SA
- No. of teams: 12
- Country: Poland
- Confederation: CEV
- Continent: Europe
- Most recent champion: PGE Budowlani Łódź (1st title) (2025–26)
- Most titles: Chemik Police (11 titles)
- Broadcaster: Polsat Sport
- Sponsor: Tauron
- Relegation to: I Liga
- International cups: Champions League; CEV Cup; CEV Challenge Cup
- Website: tauronliga.pl

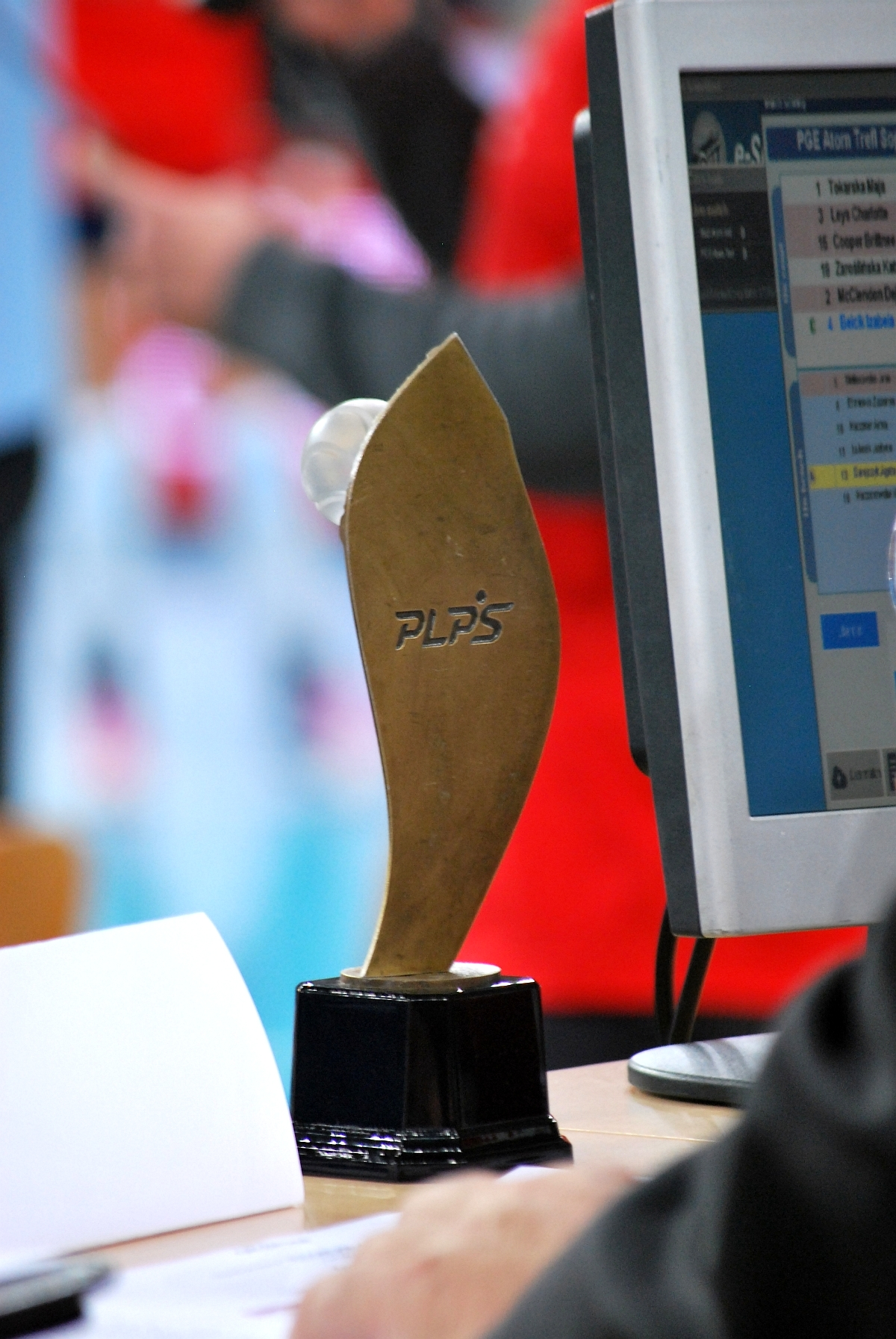
MVP Tauron Liga trophy

The Polish Women's Volleyball League, officially known as the Tauron Liga Kobiet due to its sponsorship by Tauron (previously known as Orlen Liga and PlusLiga Kobiet), is the highest level of women's volleyball played in Poland.

== Current teams ==
As of the 2026–27 season

| Team | Location |
|---|---|
| BKS Bostik ZGO Bielsko-Biała | Bielsko-Biała |
| Metalkas Pałac Bydgoszcz | Bydgoszcz |
| Netland MKS Kalisz | Kalisz |
| ŁKS Commercecon Łódź | Łódź |
| PGE Budowlani Łódź | Łódź |
| Ita Tools Stal Mielec | Mielec |
| Sokół & Hagric Mogilno | Mogilno |
| UNI Opole | Opole |
| Lotto Chemik Police | Police |
| Moya Radomka Radom | Radom |
| KS Developres Rzeszów | Rzeszów |
| #VolleyWrocław | Wrocław |

== Medallists ==
| Season | | Gold | Silver | Bronze |
|---|---|---|---|---|
| I. | 2005–06 | Muszynianka Fakro Muszyna | PTPS Nafta-Gaz Piła | Grześki Goplana Kalisz |
| II. | 2006–07 | Winiary Kalisz | PTPS Farmutil Piła | BKS Aluprof Bielsko-Biała |
| III. | 2007–08 | Muszynianka Fakro Muszyna | PTPS Farmutil Piła | Winiary-Bakalland Kalisz |
| IV. | 2008–09 | Muszynianka Fakro Muszyna | BKS Aluprof Bielsko-Biała | PTPS Farmutil Piła |
| V. | 2009–10 | BKS Aluprof Bielsko-Biała | Bank BPS Muszynianka Fakro Muszyna | Enion Energia MKS Dąbrowa Górnicza |
| VI. | 2010–11 | Bank BPS Muszynianka Fakro Muszyna | Atom Trefl Sopot | BKS Aluprof Bielsko-Biała |
| VII. | 2011–12 | Atom Trefl Sopot | Bank BPS Muszynianka Fakro Muszyna | Tauron MKS Dąbrowa Górnicza |
| VIII. | 2012–13 | Atom Trefl Sopot | Tauron MKS Dąbrowa Górnicza | Bank BPS Muszynianka Fakro Muszyna |
| IX. | 2013–14 | Chemik Police | Impel Wrocław | Atom Trefl Sopot |
| X. | 2014–15 | Chemik Police | Atom Trefl Sopot | Polski Cukier Muszyna |
| XI. | 2015–16 | Chemik Police | Atom Trefl Sopot | Impel Wrocław |
| XII. | 2016–17 | Chemik Police | Grot Budowlani Łódź | KS Developres Rzeszów |
| XIII. | 2017–18 | Chemik Police | ŁKS Commercecon Łódź | Grot Budowlani Łódź |
| XIV. | 2018–19 | ŁKS Commercecon Łódź | Grot Budowlani Łódź | KS Developres Rzeszów |
| XV. | 2019–20 | Chemik Police | KS Developres Rzeszów | ŁKS Commercecon Łódź |
| XVI. | 2020–21 | Chemik Police | KS Developres Rzeszów | ŁKS Commercecon Łódź |
| XVII. | 2021–22 | Chemik Police | KS Developres Rzeszów | ŁKS Commercecon Łódź |
| XVIII. | 2022–23 | ŁKS Commercecon Łódź | KS Developres Rzeszów | Grot Budowlani Łódź |
| XIX. | 2023–24 | Chemik Police | KS Developres Rzeszów | BKS Bielsko-Biała |
| XX. | 2024–25 | KS Developres Rzeszów | ŁKS Commercecon Łódź | PGE Grot Budowlani Łódź |
| XXI. | 2025–26 | PGE Budowlani Łódź | KS Developres Rzeszów | UNI Opole |

== Total titles won ==
| No. | Club | Gold | Silver | Bronze | Total |
|---|---|---|---|---|---|
| 1. | Chemik Police | 9 | 0 | 0 | 9 |
| 2. | Muszynianka Muszyna | 4 | 2 | 2 | 8 |
| 3. | Atom Trefl Sopot | 2 | 3 | 1 | 6 |
| 4. | ŁKS Commercecon Łódź | 2 | 1 | 3 | 6 |
| 5. | KS Developres Rzeszów | 1 | 5 | 2 | 8 |
| 6. | BKS Bielsko-Biała | 1 | 1 | 3 | 5 |
| 7. | Winiary Kalisz | 1 | 0 | 2 | 3 |
| 8. | PTPS Piła | 0 | 3 | 1 | 4 |
| 9. | Budowlani Łódź | 0 | 2 | 2 | 4 |
| 10. | MKS Dąbrowa Górnicza | 0 | 1 | 2 | 3 |
| 11. | Volleyball Wrocław | 0 | 1 | 1 | 2 |
| Total | | 18 | 18 | 18 | 54 |

== All-time team records ==
Since 1929:

| Team | Victories | First Victory | Last Victory |
|---|---|---|---|
| AWF Varsavia | 22 | 1929 | 1965/1966 |
| Bielsko-Biała | 8 | 1987/1988 | 2009/2010 |
| KPS Chemik Police | 8 | 1993/1994 | 2020/2021 |
| Wisła Kraków | 6 | 1958/1959 | 1983/1984 |
| Start Łódź | 5 | 1967/1968 | 1976/1977 |
| Płomień Milowice | 5 | 1973/1974 | 1980/1981 |
| Czarni Słupsk | 5 | 1977/1978 | 1991/1992 |
| Energa MKS Kalisz | 4 | 1996/1997 | 2006/2007 |
| MKS Muszyna | 4 | 2005/2006 | 2010/2011 |
| Piła PTPS | 4 | 1998/1999 | 2001/2002 |
| Trefl Sopot | 2 | 2011/2012 | 2012/2013 |
| Łódź HKS | 2 | 1937 | 1975/1976 |
| Unia-Chemia Łódź | 2 | 1949 | 1950 |
| Gedania Gdańsk | 2 | 1953 | 1953/1954 |
| ŁKS Łódź | 2 | 1982/1983 | 2018/2019 |
| Pałac Bydgoszcz | 1 | 1992/1993 | 1992/1993 |
| Budowlani Łódź | 1 | 2016/2017 | 2016/2017 |
| Warta Poznań | 1 | 1946 | 1946 |
| Legia Warsaw | 1 | 1960/1961 | 1960/1961 |

City

| Location | Winners | Finalists |
|---|---|---|
| Warsaw | 23 | 20 |
| Łódz | 12 | 15 |
| Bielsko-Biała | 8 | 5 |
| Police | 8 | 0 |
| Kraków | 6 | 13 |
| Słupsk | 5 | 4 |
| Sosnowiec | 5 | 1 |
| Kalisz | 4 | 3 |
| Piła | 4 | 3 |
| Muszyna | 4 | 2 |
| Sopot | 2 | 3 |
| Gdańsk | 2 | 2 |
| Bydgoszcz | 1 | 2 |
| Poznań | 1 | 1 |
| Wrocław | | 2 |
| Rzeszów | | 2 |
| Lwów | | 2 |
| Andrychów | | 2 |
| Mielec | | 1 |
| Dąbrowa Górnicza | | 1 |
| Gdynia | | 1 |
| Świdnica | | |
| Toruń | | |
Wilno

Since 2015–16:

Number of appearances
| 1 | Bielsko-Biała | 7 |
| 2 | Budowlani Łódź | 7 |
| 3 | Developres Rzeszów | 7 |
| 4 | Impel Wrocław | 7 |
| 5 | KPS Chemik Police | 7 |
| 6 | Legionovia Legionowo | 7 |
| 7 | Pałac Bydgoszcz | 7 |
| 8 | ŁKS Łódź | 6 |
| 9 | Piła PTPS | 6 |
| 10 | Energa MKS Kalisz | 4 |

Number of matches
| 1 | Developres Rzeszów | 171 |
| 2 | KPS Chemik Police | 168 |
| 3 | Budowlani Łódź | 165 |
| 4 | Impel Wroclaw | 157 |
| 5 | Legionovia Legionowo | 157 |
| 6 | Bielsko-Biała | 156 |
| 7 | Pałac Bydgoszcz | 156 |
| 8 | Piła PTPS | 151 |
| 9 | ŁKS Łódź | 142 |
| 10 | Ostrowiec Świętokrzyski | 109 |

Wins
| 1 | KPS Chemik Police | 144 |
| 2 | Developres Rzeszów | 116 |
| 3 | Budowlani Łódź | 109 |
| 4 | ŁKS Łódź | 95 |
| 5 | Bielsko-Biała | 73 |
| 6 | Impel Wrocław | 70 |
| 7 | Pałac Bydgoszcz | 59 |
| 8 | Piła PTPS | 59 |
| 9 | Legionovia Legionowo | 56 |
| 10 | MKS Muszyna | 37 |

Number of wins in games played
| 1 | KPS Chemik Police | 86 % |
| 2 | Developres Rzeszów | 68 % |
| 3 | ŁKS Łódź | 67 % |
| 4 | Budowlani Łódź | 66 % |
| 5 | Trefl Sopot | 54 % |
| 6 | Trefl Proxima Kraków | 48 % |
| 7 | Bielsko-Biała | 47 % |
| 8 | MKS Radomka Radom | 47 % |
| 9 | Impel Wrocław | 45 % |
| 10 | MKS Muszyna | 45 % |

(Based on W=2 pts and D=1 pts)

| | Team | S | Firs | Best | Pts | MP | W | L | GF | GA | diff |
|---|---|---|---|---|---|---|---|---|---|---|---|
| 1 | KPS Chemik Police | 7 | 2015/2016 | 1st | 312 | 168 | 144 | 24 | 462 | 157 | +305 |
| 2 | Developres Rzeszów | 7 | 2015/2016 | 2nd | 287 | 171 | 116 | 55 | 401 | 246 | +155 |
| 3 | Budowlani Łódź | 7 | 2015/2016 | 2nd | 274 | 165 | 109 | 56 | 377 | 249 | +128 |
| 4 | ŁKS Łódź | 6 | 2016/2017 | 1st | 237 | 142 | 95 | 47 | 323 | 216 | +107 |
| 5 | Bielsko-Biała | 7 | 2015/2016 | - | 229 | 156 | 73 | 83 | 295 | 304 | -9 |
| 6 | Impel Wrocław | 7 | 2015/2016 | 3rd | 227 | 157 | 70 | 87 | 286 | 320 | -34 |
| 7 | Pałac Bydgoszcz | 7 | 2015/2016 | - | 215 | 156 | 59 | 97 | 262 | 336 | -74 |
| 8 | Legionovia Legionowo | 7 | 2015/2016 | - | 213 | 157 | 56 | 101 | 240 | 355 | -115 |
| 9 | Piła PTPS | 6 | 2015/2016 | - | 210 | 151 | 59 | 92 | 229 | 323 | -94 |
| 10 | Ostrowiec Świętokrzyski | 4 | 2015/2016 | - | 136 | 109 | 27 | 82 | 133 | 277 | -144 |
| 11 | MKS Muszyna | 3 | 2015/2016 | - | 119 | 82 | 37 | 45 | 146 | 171 | -25 |
| 12 | Dąbrowa Górnicza | 3 | 2015/2016 | 4th | 117 | 81 | 36 | 45 | 142 | 161 | -19 |
| 13 | MKS Radomka Radom | 4 | 2018/2019 | 4th | 116 | 79 | 37 | 42 | 144 | 162 | -18 |
| 14 | Energa MKS Kalisz | 4 | 2018/2019 | - | 102 | 73 | 29 | 44 | 124 | 160 | -36 |
| 15 | Trefl Sopot | 2 | 2015/2016 | 2nd | 86 | 56 | 30 | 26 | 112 | 104 | +8 |
| 16 | Budowlani Toruń | 2 | 2016/2017 | - | 74 | 54 | 20 | 34 | 79 | 124 | -45 |
| 17 | Trefl Proxima Kraków | 1 | 2017/2018 | - | 43 | 29 | 14 | 15 | 56 | 56 | 0 |
| 18 | MUKS Joker Świecie | 2 | 2020/2021 | - | 26 | 22 | 4 | 18 | 25 | 57 | -32 |
| 19 | Wisła Warsaw | 1 | 2019/2020 | - | 22 | 22 | 0 | 22 | 8 | 66 | -58 |

== See also ==
- PlusLiga
- Volleyball in Poland
- Sports in Poland
