= Belgian Women's Volleyball Cup =

Volleyball in Belgium

- Sport: Volleyball
- Founded: 1968
- Administrator: KVBV
- Country: Belgium
- Continent: Europe
- Most recent champion: VC Oudegem 2nd Title
- Most titles: Asterix AVO 16 Titles
- Website: http://www.volleyvvb.be/

The Belgian Women's Volleyball Cup is a Belgian women's Volleyball Cup competition held every single year and it is organized by the Royal Belgian Volleyball Federation (Koninklijk Belgisch Volleybal Verbond KBVB), it was established in 1968.

== Competition Format ==
The competition is played in a knockout format on an autumn–spring schedule. The winners of the semi-finals advance to the final, where they compete for the Cup.

In the 2025/26 Cup final, VC Oudegem defeated Darta Bevo Roeselare 3–0.

== Winners list ==
Years	Winners	Score	Runners-up
1968	VC Verbroedering Ons Genoegen		
1969	VC Verbroedering Ons Genoegen		
1970	VC Verbroedering Ons Genoegen		
1971	Hermes Volley Oostende		
1972	Hermes Volley Oostende		
1973	VC Verbroedering Ons Genoegen		
1974	Dilbeek-Itterbeek SC		
1975	VC Verbroedering Ons Genoegen		
1976	VC Verbroedering Ons Genoegen		
1977	Hermes Volley Oostende		
1978	Dilbeek-Itterbeek SC		
1979	VC Temse Dames		
1980	Dilbeek-Itterbeek SC		
1981	Dilbeek-Itterbeek SC		
1982	Hermes Volley Oostende		
1983	Hermes Volley Oostende		
1984	DECO Denderhoutem		
1985	Antonius Herentals		
1986	Saco Halle		
1987	Antonius Herentals		
1988	Hermanas Wervik		
1989	VC Temse Dames		
1990	Antonius Herentals	3 – 2 (15-8, 13-15, 15-8, 10-15, 16-14)	VT Kortrijk
1991	VC Temse Dames		Antonius Herentals
1992	Hatovoc Tongeren		
1993	Antonius Herentals	3 – 1 (15-9, 10-15, 15-13, 15-6)	Dauphines Charleroi
1994	Datovoc Tongeren		
1995	Dauphines Charleroi	3 – 1 (15-9, 15-11, 12-15, 15-8)	Kärcher Herentals
1996	Asterix Kieldrecht		Datovoc Tongeren
1997	Kärcher Herentals		Datovoc Tongeren
1998	Asterix Kieldrecht		
1999	Asterix Kieldrecht	3 – 0 (?)	Isola Tongeren
2000	Isola Tongeren		Kärcher Herentals
2001	Asterix Kieldrecht	3 – 1 (23-25, 25-17, 25-23, 25-12)	Fortis Herentals
2002	Asterix Kieldrecht	3 – 0 (?)	AVO Melsele
2003	Eburon Tongeren		Asterix Kieldrecht
2004	Eburon Tongeren	3 – 1 (25-18, 27-29, 30-28, 25-22)	Asterix Kieldrecht
2005	Eburon Tongeren	3 – 0 (25-9, 25-20, 25-13)	Asterix Kieldrecht
2006	Asterix Kieldrecht	3 – 0 (25-20, 28-26, 25-15)	Dauphines Charleroi
2007	Asterix Kieldrecht	3 – 0 (25-21, 25-20, 25-17)	VDK Gent Dames
2008	Asterix Kieldrecht	3 – 1 (25-23, 16-25, 25-15, 25-20)	VDK Gent Dames
2009	VDK Gent Dames	3 – 2 (23-25, 25-20, 21-25, 25-21, 15-12)	Asterix Kieldrecht
2010	Asterix Kieldrecht	3 – 0 (25-21, 25-16, 26-24)	Dauphines Charleroi
2011	Asterix Kieldrecht	3 – 2 (25-22, 25-23, 13-25, 19-25, 15-12)	VDK Gent Dames
2012	Dauphines Charleroi	3 – 1 (25-20, 25-20, 16-25, 25-20)	Asterix Kieldrecht
2013	VC Oudegem	3 – 1 (27-29, 25-20, 25-16, 25-23)	Asterix Kieldrecht
2014	Asterix Kieldrecht	3 – 1 (25-14, 19-25, 25-20, 25-19)	Richa Michelbeke
2015	Asterix Kieldrecht	3 – 0 (25-10, 25-22, 25-16)	VDK Gent Dames
2016	Asterix Kieldrecht	3 – 0 (25-15, 25-18, 25-23)	Datovoc Tongeren
2017	Asterix Kieldrecht	3 – 1 (26-24, 25-15, 22-25, 25-18)	VDK Gent Dames
2018	Asterix Avo Beveren	3 – 0 (25-21, 25-15, 25-19)	VC Oudegem
2019	Hermes Volley Oostende	3 – 1 (25-21, 19-25, 25-17, 28-26)	Saturnus Michelbeke
2020	Rekkenshop Hermes Oostende	3 – 2 (25-20, 21-25, 25-16, 14-25, 15-13)	Asterix Avo Beveren
