= Turkish Volleyball Federation =

Governing body of volleyball in Turkey

- Sport: Volleyball; Beach volleyball
- Jurisdiction: Turkey
- Abbreviation: TVF
- Founded: 1958
- Affiliation: FIVB
- Regional affiliation: CEV
- Headquarters: Ankara
- Location: Turkey
- President: Mehmet Akif Ustundag (2016-present)

Official website
- www.tvf.org.tr
- (Turkey)

Turkish Volleyball Federation (TVF) (in Turkish: Türkiye Voleybol Federasyonu) is the governing body of volleyball and beach volleyball in Turkey. Formed in 1958, it is based in Ankara. The TVF is a member of the International Volleyball Federation (FIVB) and the European Volleyball Confederation (CEV).

== Volleyball ==
=== National League ===
Men's leagues

- AXA Sigorta Efeler Ligi (14 teams)
- Turkish Men's Volleyball First League (24 teams in two groups)
- Turkish Men's Volleyball Second League (54 teams in four groups)
- Turkish Men's Regional Volleybal League (125 teams in thirty five groups)

Men's cups

- Turkish Men's Volleyball Cup
- Turkish Men's Volleyball Super Cup

Women's leagues

- Vodafone Sultanlar Ligi (14 teams)

Turkish Women's Volleyball First League (24 teams in two groups)

- Turkish Women's Volleyball Second League (155 teams in sixteen groups)
- Turkish Women's Regional Volleybal League (219 teams in sixty four groups)

Women's cups

- Turkish Women's Volleyball Cup
- Turkish Women's Volleyball Super Cup

=== National teams ===
- Turkey men's team
- Turkey men's U19 team
- Turkey men's U21 team
- Turkey men's U23 team
- Turkey women's team
- Turkey women's U18 team
- Turkey women's U20 team
- Turkey women's U23 team
- Turkey men's national beach volleyball team
- Turkey women's national beach volleyball team

==== International ====
Turkish clubs and national teams participate after qualification at the Olympics, Mediterranean Games, Balkan Games as well as world and European events of following competitions:

Men's

National teams

Men's

- Men's European Volleyball Championship - Hosted: (1967, 2009)
- Men's European Volleyball League - Hosted: (2006, 2008, 2012, 2013)

(silver) (2012)
(bronze) (2008, 2010)
Men's Junior

- Men's Junior European Volleyball Championship - Hosted: (1994)

Boys' Youth

- Boys' Youth European Volleyball Championship

Clubs

- CEV Men's Champions League

(bronze) (1979-80 Eczacıbaşı)
(silver) (2013-14 Halkbank)

- Men's CEV Cup

(gold) (2012-13 Halkbank)

- Men's Challenge Cup

(gold) (2008-09 Arkas, 2013-14 Fenerbahçe Grundig)
(silver) (1996-97 Netaş, 2010-11 Arkas)

Women's

National teams

Women's

- FIVB Women's Volleyball World Championship
- FIVB World Grand Prix

(bronze) (2012)

- Women's European Volleyball Championship - Hosted: (1967, 2003)

(silver) (2003),
(bronze) (2011)

- European Volleyball League - Hosted: (2009, 2010, 2011)

(silver) (2009, 2011)
(bronze) (2010)
Women's Junior

- Women's Junior European Volleyball Championship - Hosted: (1996, 2012)

(gold) (2012)
(bronze) (2008)
Girls' Youth

- Girls Youth Volleyball World Championship - Hosted: (2011)

(gold) (2011)
(silver) (2007)

- Girls' Youth European Volleyball Championship - Hosted: (2011)

(gold) (2011)
(bronze) (2013)

- European Youth Olympic Festival

(gold) (2009)
(bronze) (2007, 2011)

Clubs

- FIVB Volleyball Women's Club World Championship

(gold) (2010 Fenerbahçe, 2013 Vakıfbank, 2015 Eczacıbaşı)
(silver) (2011 Vakıfbank)
(bronze) (2012 Fenerbahçe)

- CEV Women's Champions League

(gold) (2010-11 Vakıfbank, 2011-12 Fenerbahçe, 2012-13 Vakıfbank, 2014-15 Eczacıbaşı)
(silver) (1979-80 Eczacıbaşı, 1997-98 Vakıfbank, 1998-99 Vakıfbank, 2009-10 Fenerbahçe, 2013-14 Vakıfbank)
(bronze) (1999-20 Eczacıbaşı, 2010-11 Fenerbahçe, 2014-15 Vakıfbank)

- Women's CEV Cup

(gold) (1998-99 Eczacıbaşı, 2003-04 Vakıfbank, 2013-14 Fenerbahçe)
(silver) (2011-12 Galatasaray, 2012-13 Fenerbahçe, 2015-16 Galatasaray)

- Women's Challenge Cup

(gold) (2007-08 Vakıfbank, 2014-15 Bursa BBSK)
(silver) (1992-93 Eczacıbaşı, 1995-96 Emlakbank, 2013-2014 Beşiktaş, 2015-16 Trabzon İdmanocağı)

- Değer Eraybar Tournament:* Top Volley Tournament

== Beach volleyball ==
=== Competitions ===
- Men's Beach Volleyball League (8 teams)
- Women's Beach Volleyball League (5 teams)

== Medals ==
=== World Championship ===
Event	Gold	Silver	Bronze	Total
FIVB Women's Volleyball World Championship	0	1	0	1
FIVB Men's Volleyball World Championship	0	0	0	0
FIVB Volleyball Women's U23 World Championship	1	1	0	2
FIVB Volleyball Men's U23 World Championship	0	1	0	1
FIVB Volleyball Women's U21 World Championship	0	0	0	0
FIVB Volleyball Men's U21 World Championship	0	0	0	0
FIVB Volleyball Girls' U19 World Championship	1	2	0	3
FIVB Volleyball Boys' U19 World Championship	0	0	0	0
FIVB Volleyball Girls' U17 World Championship	0	0	0	0
FIVB Volleyball Boys' U17 World Championship	0	0	0	0
Total	2	4	0	6

=== European Championship ===
Event	Gold	Silver	Bronze	Total
Women's European Volleyball Championship	1	2	3	6
Men's European Volleyball Championship	0	0	0	0
CEV Women's U22 Volleyball European Championship	0	0	2	2
CEV U22 Volleyball European Championship	0	0	0	0
CEV Women's U20 Volleyball European Championship	3	0	3	6
CEV U20 Volleyball European Championship	0	0	0	0
CEV Women's U18 Volleyball European Championship	1	2	2	5
CEV U18 Volleyball European Championship	0	0	2	2
CEV Women's U16 Volleyball European Championship	1	2	0	3
CEV U16 Volleyball European Championship	0	0	1	1
Total	5	6	13	24

== Facilities ==
The federation owns volleyball venues TVF 50th Anniversary Sport Hall and TVF Burhan Felek Sport Hall in Üsküdar, Istanbul and Başkent Volleyball Hall in Yenimahalle, Ankara.

In 2009, it established TVF Fine Arts and Sports High School (Turkish: TVF Güzel Sanatlar ve Spor Lisesi) in Ankara, dedicated to raise talented youth to sportspeople particularly in volleyball.

== See also ==
- Turkish Football Federation
- Turkish Basketball Federation
