= Aylin Sarıoğlu =

Turkish volleyball player (born 1995)

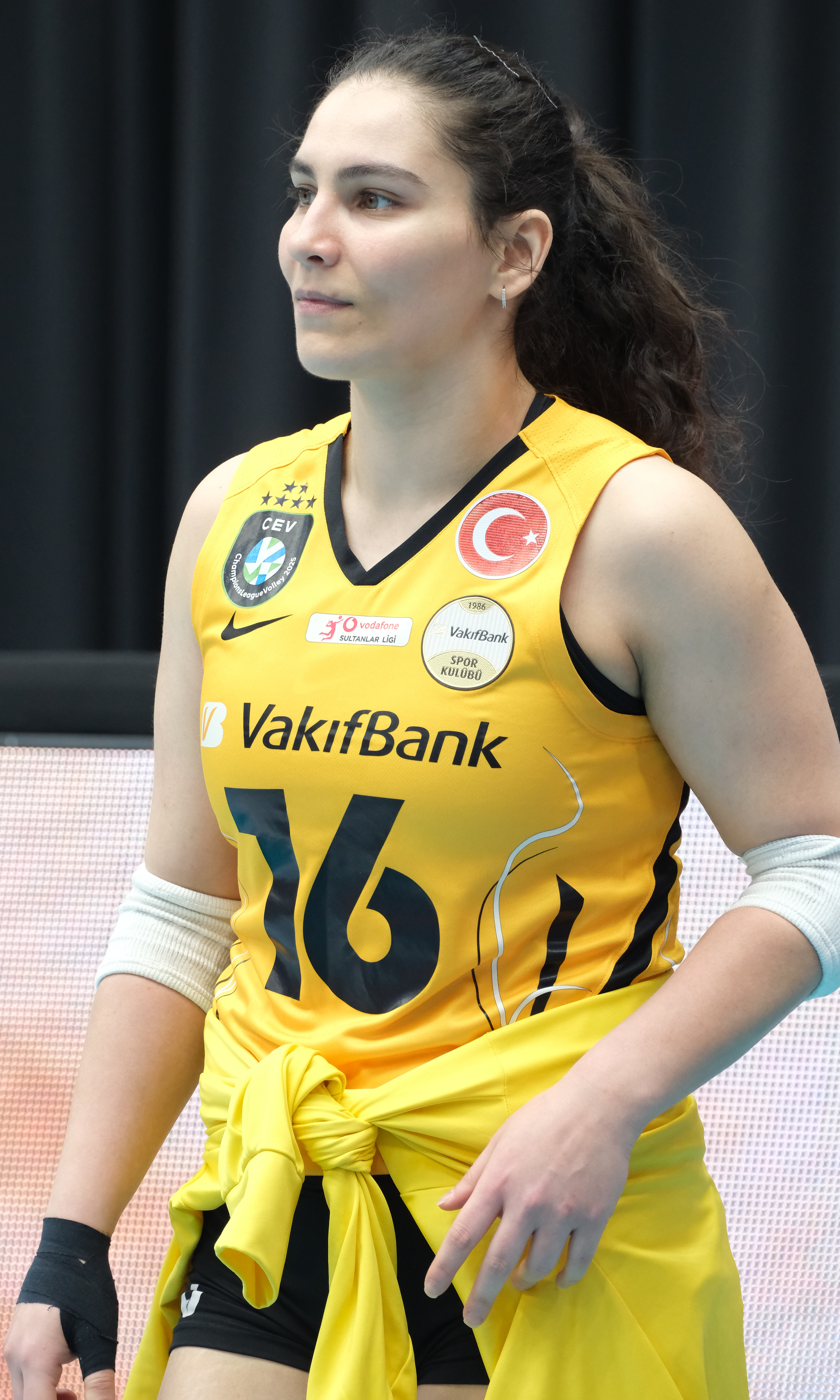
- Aylin Sarıoğlu in 2024

Personal information
- Born: 21 July 1995 (age 31); Turkey
- Height: 1.68 m (5 ft 6 in)
- Weight: 67 kg (148 lb)
- Spike: 250 cm (98 in)
- Block: 230 cm (91 in)

Volleyball information
- Position: Libero

Career
Years
- 2004–2018
- 2018-2019
- 2019-
Teams
- Bursa BB
- Nilüfer BS
- Fenerbahce Opet

National team
2018–	Turkey
Honours
Women's volleyball
Representing Turkey
FIVB Nations League
Silver medal – second place	2018 Nanjing	Team

Aylin Sarıoğlu (born 21 July 1995) is a Turkish professional volleyball player. She is 1.68 m (5 ft 6 in) tall and plays as libero. She is part of the Turkey women's national volleyball team.

== Personal life ==
Aylin Sarıoğlu was born in Turkey on 21 July 1995. Currently, she is a student at the Sports Academy of Uludağ University in Bursa.

== Playing career ==
=== Club ===
Sarıoğlu started to play volleyball at the age of nine joining her hometown club Bursa Büyükşehir Belediyespor. In the 2011–12 season, she was admitted o the senior team, and became professional. She enjoyed her team's promotion to the Turkish Women's Volleyball League, and played at the CEV Women's Challenge Cup in 2013–14, 2014–15, 2015–16, 2016–17 and 2017–18 with her team. She enjoyed her team's twice gold (2014–15, 2016–17), once silver (2017–18) and once bronze medal (2015–16).

After Bursa BB folded in 2018, Sarıoğlu signed with another Bursa-based club, Nilüfer BS, for the 2018–19 season.

=== International ===
Sarıoğşu was admitted to the Turkey women's national volleyball team first time in 2018. She played at the 2018 FIVB Volleyball Women's Nations League with the national team, which won the silver medal.

== Honours ==
=== Club ===
Champions (2)
2014–15 CEV Women's Challenge Cup (Bursa BB),
2016–17 CEV Women's Challenge Cup (Bursa BB)
Runners-up (1)
2017–18 CEV Women's Challenge Cup (Bursa BB)
Third places (1)
2015–16 CEV Women's Challenge Cup (Bursa BB)

=== International ===
Runners-up (1)
2018 FIVB Volleyball Women's Nations League
