= Ewa Piątkowska (volleyball) =

Polish volleyball player (born 1980)

Personal information
- Nationality: Polish
- Born: 24 June 1980 (age 46); Ruda Śląska
- Height: 1.88 cm (1 in)

Volleyball information
- Position: Middle blocker

Career
Years	Teams
2001-2005; 2005-2006; 2007-2008; 2009-2012; 2012-2013; 2014-2015; 2016-2017	(Spain) University of Granada (Belgium) Dauphines Charleroi (Belgium) Asterix Kieldrecht (Belgium) Dauphines Charleroi (Belgium) VC Oudegem (Belgium) VC Oudegem (Belgium) Dauphines Charleroi

Ewa Piątkowska (born 24 June 1980) is a Polish volleyball player.

== Sporting achievements ==
=== Clubs ===
Belgian Championship:

- 2006, 2008
- 2010, 2012

Belgian Cup:

- 2008, 2012, 2013
