= 2015–16 CEV Women's Challenge Cup =

- League: CEV Women's Challenge Cup
- Sport: Volleyball
- Duration: 10 November 2015 – 3 April 2016
- Number of matches: 90 (including 2 awarded)
- Number of teams: 46

Finals
- Champions: (Romania) CSM București
- Runners-up: (Turkey) Trabzon İdmanocağı
- Finals MVP: (Serbia) Jelena Blagojević

CEV Women's Challenge Cup seasons
- ← 2014–15 2016–17 →

The 2015–16 CEV Women's Challenge Cup was the 36th edition of the European Challenge Cup volleyball club tournament, the former "CEV Cup".

== Format ==
The tournament was played on a knockout format, with a total of 46 teams participating. Initially 30 teams were allocated vacancies to enter the competition at the 'Qualification phase', with another 16 teams joining from the Women's CEV Cup entering the competition at the 'Main phase' stage (as per 'Round composition' below).

On 5 June 2015, a drawing of lots in Luxembourg City, Luxembourg, determined the team's pairing for each match. Each team played a home and an away match with result points awarded for each leg (3 points for 3–0 or 3–1 wins, 2 points for 3–2 win, 1 point for 2–3 loss). After two legs, the team with the most result points advanced to the next round. In case the teams were tied after two legs, a Golden Set was played immediately at the completion of the second leg. The Golden Set winner is the team that first obtains 15 points, provided that the points difference between the two teams is at least 2 points (thus, the Golden Set is similar to a tiebreak set in a normal match).

Round composition

- 2nd Round: 30 teams
- 16th Final: 2nd Round winners (16 teams) + 16 teams from CEV Cup
- 8th Final onwards: winners

== Participating teams ==
- A total of 46 teams participated, 30 were allocated direct places and 16 joined from the Women's CEV Cup entering at the 'Main phase'.

| Rank | Country | No. teams | | | Teams (rankings in 2014–15 national championships) |
| Rank | Country | Vac | Cev | Total | Teams (rankings in 2014–15 national championships) |
|---|---|---|---|---|---|
| 1 | Turkey | 2 | - | 2 | Bursa BBSK (5); Trabzon İdmanocağı (6) |
| 2 | Russia | 1 | - | 1 | Zarechie Odintsovo (4) |
| 3 | France | 1 | 2 | 3 | Béziers VB; Nantes VB^{1} SF Paris Saint Cloud^{1} |
| 6 | Germany | 1 | 1 | 2 | Rote Raben Vilsbiburg; VC Wiesbaden^{1} |
| 8 | Romania | 1 | 1 | 2 | C.S.M. București; C.S.M. Târgovişte^{1} |
| 9 | Switzerland | 2 | 1 | 3 | Sm Aesch Pfeffingen; VFM Franches-Montagnes; Viteos Neuchâtel Université^{1} |
| 10 | Czech Republic | - | 2 | 2 | Královo Pole Brno^{1} VK UP Olomouc^{1} |
| 11 | Serbia | 2 | - | 2 | Jedinstvo Stara Pazova; KV Skenderaj |
| | Austria | 3 | - | 3 | SVS Post Schwechat; Ti-panoramabau Innsbruck; UVC Holding Graz |
| | Hungary | 3 | - | 3 | Fatum Nyíregyháza; Teva Gödöllõ; Vasas Obuda Budapest |
| | Greece | 2 | 1 | 3 | AEK Athens; AON Pannaxiakos Naxos; Olympiacos Piraeus^{1} |
| | Belgium | 1 | 2 | 3 | Asterix Kieldrecht; Dauphines Charleroi^{1} Hermes Oostende^{1} |
| | Netherlands | 1 | 2 | 3 | Eurosped TVT Almelo^{1} Sliedrecht Sport; VC Sneek^{1} |
| | Croatia | 2 | - | 2 | Mladost Zagreb; OK Poreč |
| | Finland | 1 | 1 | 2 | HPK Hämeenlinna^{1} Wovo Rovaniemi |
| | Israel | 1 | 1 | 2 | Haifa VC^{1} Hapoel Kfar Saba |
| | Belarus | 1 | - | 1 | Minchanka Minsk |
| | Bosnia and Herzegovina | 1 | - | 1 | ŽOK Bimal-Jedinstvo Brčko |
| | Luxembourg | 1 | - | 1 | RSR Walfer |
| | Norway | 1 | - | 1 | Stod Volley Steinkjer |
| | Portugal | 1 | - | 1 | AVC Famalicão |
| | Spain | 1 | - | 1 | Naturhouse Ciudad de Logroño |
| | Cyprus | - | 1 | 1 | Apollon Prestige Limassol^{1} |
| | Estonia | - | 1 | 1 | Kohila VC^{1} |

1. Team qualified via CEV Cup entering the 16th Final.

== Qualification phase ==
=== 2nd round ===
- 1st leg (Team #1 home) 10–12 November 2015
- 2nd leg (Team #2 home) 24–26 November 2015

| Match# | Team #1 | Results | Team #2 |
|---|---|---|---|
| 1 | Bursa BBSK (Turkey) | – – | Bye |
| 2 | Mladost Zagreb (Croatia) | 3 – 0; 3 – 0 | (Hungary) Teva Gödöllõ |
| 3 | RSR Walfer (Luxembourg) | 1 – 3; 2 – 3 | (Austria) Ti Meraner Volley Innsbruck |
| 4 | Sliedrecht Sport (Netherlands) | 1 – 3; 2 – 3 | (Belgium) Asterix Kieldrecht |
| 5 | CSM București (Romania) | 3 – 1; 3 – 0 | (Bosnia and Herzegovina) ŽOK Bimal-Jedinstvo Brčko |
| 6 | Vasas Obuda Budapest (Hungary) | 3 – 1; 3 – 0 | (Austria) UVC Holding Graz |
| 7 | Minchanka Minsk (Belarus) | 3 – 2; 3 – 0 | (Greece) AEK Athens |
| 8 | AVC Famalicão (Portugal) | 0 – 3; 0 – 3 | (Germany) Rote Raben Vilsbiburg |
| 9 | Béziers Volley (France) | 3 – 2; 0 – 3 | (Switzerland) Vfm Franches Montagnes |
| 10 | Trabzon İdmanocağı (Turkey) | 3 – 0; 3 – 0 | (Greece) Pannaxiakos |
| 11 | Hapoel Kfar Saba (Israel) | 3 – 0; 3 – 0 | (Serbia) KV Skenderaj |
| 12 | Naturhouse Ciudad de Logroño (Spain) | 2 – 3; 1 – 3 | (Switzerland) Sm Aesch Pfeffingen |
| 13 | ŽOK Jedinstvo Stara Pazova (Serbia) | 3 – 1; 3 – 1 | (Hungary) Fatum Nyíregyháza |
| 14 | OK Poreč (Croatia) | 3 – 1; 1 – 3 Golden Set: 15–11 | (Austria) SVS Post Schwechat |
| 15* | Stod Volley Steinkjer (Norway) | 0 – 3; 0 – 3 | (Finland) Wovo Rovaniemi |
| 16 | Bye | – – | (Russia) Zarechie Odintsovo |

*Note: Stod Volley Steinkjer withdrew from the competition. The CEV awarded Wovo Rovaniemi both matches by 3–0.

== Main phase ==
In this stage of the competition, the sixteen qualified teams of the Qualification phase were joined by the sixteen losing teams from the 2015–16 Women's CEV Cup.

| Qualified via the Qualification phase | Qualified via Women's CEV Cup |
|---|---|
| (Turkey) Bursa BBSK (Croatia) Mladost Zagreb (Austria) Ti Meraner Volley Innsbruck (Belgium) Asterix Kieldrecht (Romania) CSM București (Hungary) Vasas Obuda Budapest (Belarus) Minchanka Minsk (Germany) Rote Raben Vilsbiburg (Switzerland) Vfm Franches Montagnes (Turkey) Trabzon İdmanocağı (Israel) Hapoel Kfar Saba (Switzerland) Sm Aesch Pfeffingen (Serbia) ŽOK Jedinstvo Stara Pazova (Croatia) OK Poreč (Finland) Wovo Rovaniemi (Russia) Zarechie Odintsovo | (Switzerland) Viteos Neuchâtel Université (Netherlands) VC Sneek (Czech Republic) VK Královo Pole Brno (Finland) HPK Hämeenlinna (Germany) VC Wiesbaden (Estonia) Kohila VC (Israel) Haifa VC (Romania) CSM Târgovişte (France) SF Paris Saint Cloud (France) Nantes VB (Belgium) Dauphines Charleroi (Czech Republic) VK UP Olomouc (Cyprus) Apollon Prestige Limassol (Netherlands) Eurosped Tvt Almelo (Greece) Olympiacos Piraeus (Belgium) Hermes Oostende |

=== 16th final ===
- 1st leg (Team #1 home) 8–10 December 2015
- 2nd leg (Team #2 home) 15–17 December 2015

| Match# | Team #1 | Results | Team #2 |
|---|---|---|---|
| 17 | Bursa BBSK (Turkey) | 3 – 0; 3 – 0 | (Cyprus) Apollon Prestige Limassol |
| 18 | Nantes VB (France) | 3 – 0; 3 – 0 | (Croatia) Mladost Zagreb |
| 19 | Viteos Neuchâtel Université (Switzerland) | 3 – 0; 3 – 2 | (Austria) Ti Meraner Volley Innsbruck |
| 20 | Haifa VC (Israel) | 0 – 3; 0 – 3 | (Belgium) Asterix Kieldrecht |
| 21 | CSM București (Romania) | 3 – 2; 3 – 0 | (Czech Republic) VK Královo Pole Brno |
| 22 | Olympiacos Piraeus (Greece) | 3 – 0; 3 – 1 | (Hungary) Vasas Obuda Budapest |
| 23 | VC Wiesbaden (Germany) | 2 – 3; 3 – 1 | (Belarus) Minchanka Minsk |
| 24 | Rote Raben Vilsbiburg (Germany) | 0 – 3; 3 – 0 Golden Set: 15–12 | (Belgium) Dauphines Charleroi |
| 25 | Hermes Oostende (Belgium) | 0 – 3; 0 – 3 | (Switzerland) Vfm Franches Montagnes |
| 26 | Trabzon İdmanocağı (Turkey) | 3 – 1; 3 – 0 | (Romania) CSM Târgovişte |
| 27 | Kohila VC (Estonia) | 3 – 1; 0 – 3 Golden Set: 8–15 | (Israel) Hapoel Kfar Saba |
| 28 | Sm Aesch Pfeffingen (Switzerland) | 3 – 0; 1 – 3 Golden Set: 15–12 | (Finland) HPK Hämeenlinna |
| 29 | SF Paris Saint Cloud (France) | 3 – 1; 3 – 1 | (Serbia) ŽOK Jedinstvo Stara Pazova |
| 30 | VK UP Olomouc (Czech Republic) | 3 – 0; 3 – 0 | (Croatia) OK Poreč |
| 31 | Eurosped Tvt Almelo (Netherlands) | 3 – 0; 3 – 2 | (Finland) Wovo Rovaniemi |
| 32 | Zarechie Odintsovo (Russia) | 3 – 0; 3 – 1 | (Netherlands) VC Sneek |

=== 8th final ===
- 1st leg (Team #1 home) 19–21 January 2016
- 2nd leg (Team #2 home) 26–28 January 2016

| Match# | Team #1 | Results | Team #2 |
|---|---|---|---|
| 33 | Bursa BBSK (Turkey) | 3 – 1; 3 – 1 | (France) Nantes VB |
| 34 | Viteos Neuchâtel Université (Switzerland) | 2 – 3; 0 – 3 | (Belgium) Asterix Kieldrecht |
| 35 | Olympiacos Piraeus (Greece) | 3 – 0; 1 – 3 Golden Set: 13–15 | (Romania) CSM București |
| 36 | Rote Raben Vilsbiburg (Germany) | 2 – 3; 2 – 3 | (Germany) VC Wiesbaden |
| 37 | Vfm Franches Montagnes (Switzerland) | 0 – 3; 0 – 3 | (Turkey) Trabzon İdmanocağı |
| 38 | Hapoel Kfar Saba (Israel) | 2 – 3; 1 – 3 | (Switzerland) Sm Aesch Pfeffingen |
| 39 | VK UP Olomouc (Czech Republic) | 3 – 2; 1 – 3 | (France) SF Paris Saint Cloud |
| 40 | Eurosped Tvt Almelo (Netherlands) | 0 – 3; 0 – 3 | (Russia) Zarechie Odintsovo |

=== 4th final ===
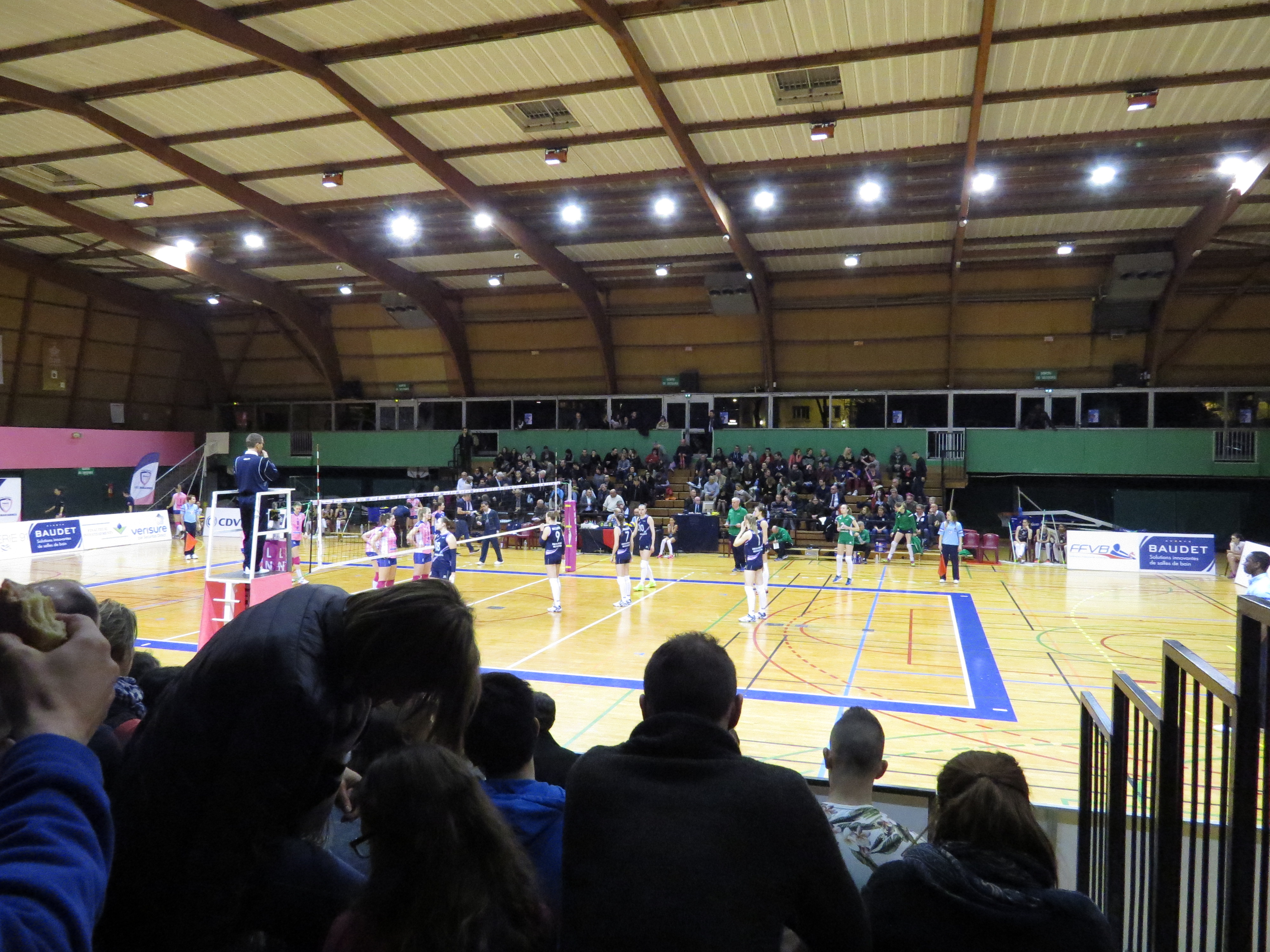
Saint-Cloud Paris Stade français - Zaretchie Odintsovo

- 1st leg (Team #1 home) 9–11 February 2016
- 2nd leg (Team #2 home) 23–25 February 2016

| Match# | Team #1 | Results | Team #2 |
|---|---|---|---|
| 41 | Asterix Kieldrecht (Belgium) | 0 – 3; 1 – 3 | (Turkey) Bursa BBSK |
| 42 | VC Wiesbaden (Germany) | 0 – 3; 0 – 3 | (Romania) CSM București |
| 43 | Sm Aesch Pfeffingen (Switzerland) | 0 – 3; 0 – 3 | (Turkey) Trabzon İdmanocağı |
| 44 | Zarechie Odintsovo (Russia) | 3 – 2; 3 – 0 | (France) SF Paris Saint Cloud |

== Final phase ==
=== Semi-finals ===
- 1st leg (Team #1 home) 9 March 2016
- 2nd leg (Team #2 home) 13 March 2016

| Match# | Team #1 | Results | Team #2 |
|---|---|---|---|
| 45 | Bursa BBSK (Turkey) | 1 – 3; 0 – 3 | (Romania) CSM București |
| 46 | Zarechie Odintsovo (Russia) | 2 – 3; 0 – 3 | (Turkey) Trabzon İdmanocağı |

=== Finals ===
- 1st leg (Team #1 home) 30 March 2016
- 2nd leg (Team #2 home) 3 April 2016

| Match# | Team #1 | Results | Team #2 |
|---|---|---|---|
| 47 | CSM București (Romania) | 3 – 1; 3 – 1 | (Turkey) Trabzon İdmanocağı |

2015–16 CEV Women's Challenge Cup Champions

CSM București
1st title

== Awards ==
| Award | Winner | Team |
|---|---|---|
| MVP | (Serbia) Jelena Blagojević | (Turkey) Trabzon İdmanocağı |
