= Anna Werblińska =

Polish volleyball player

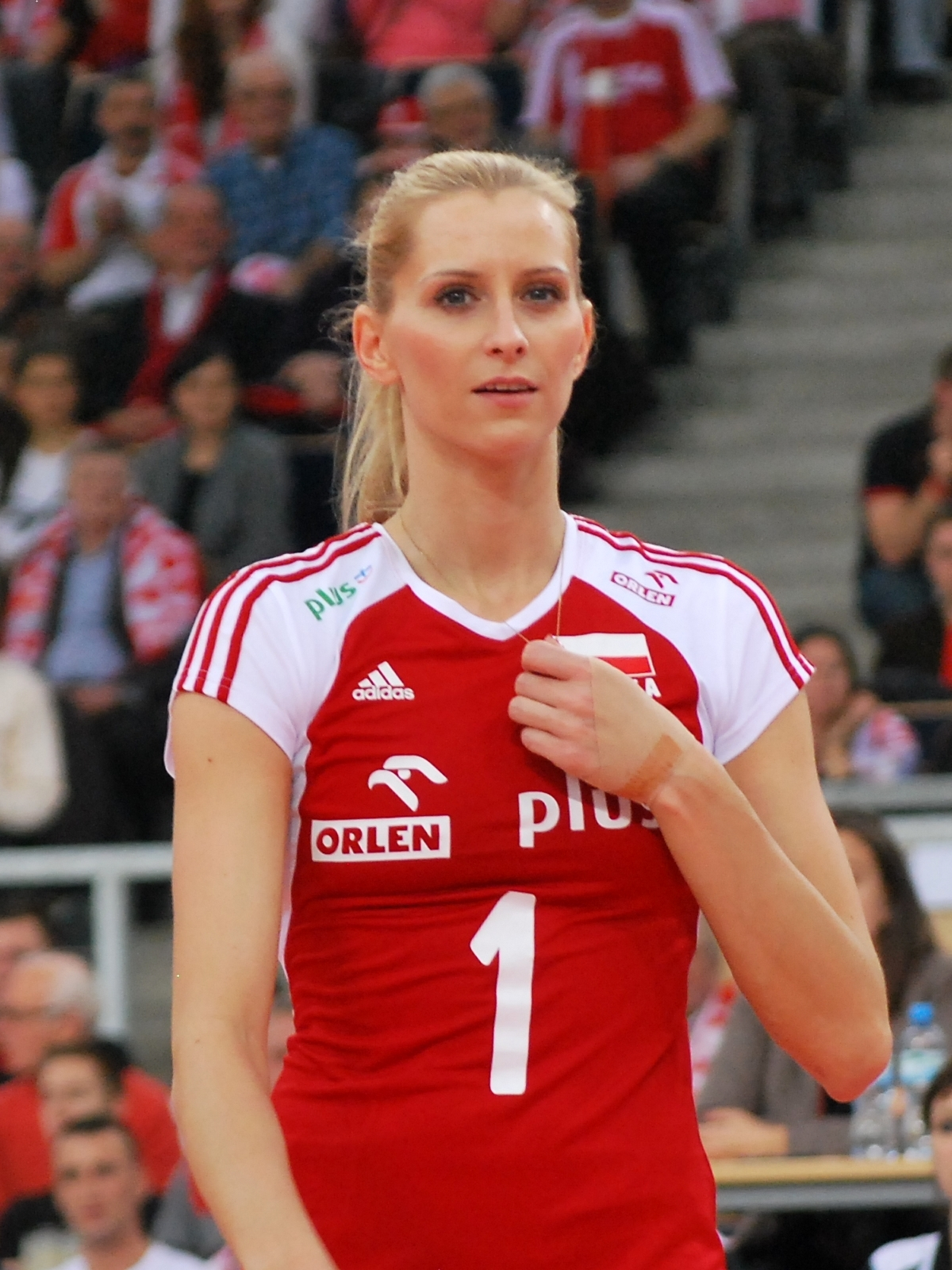

Personal information
- Full name: Anna Katarzyna Werblińska (nee Barańska)
- Nationality: Polish
- Born: 14 May 1984 (age 42); Świdnica, Poland
- Height: 1.78 m (5 ft 10 in)
- Weight: 69 kg (152 lb)
- Spike: 308 cm (121 in)
- Block: 292 cm (115 in)

Volleyball information
- Position: Outside hitter
- Number: 1

Career
Years	Teams
2001–2005; 2005–2008; 2008–2011; 2011–2013; 2013–	Polonia Świdnica; Impel Wrocław; Winiary Kalisz; BKS Stal Bielsko-Biała; Muszynianka Muszyna; KPS Chemik Police

National team
2006–2016	Poland
Honours
Women's volleyball
Representing Poland
European Championship
Bronze medal – third place	2009 Poland
European Games
Silver medal – second place	2015 Baku
- Last updated: 16 December 2017

Anna Werblińska (née Barańska, born 14 May 1984) is a Polish volleyball player, a member of Poland women's national volleyball team in 2006–2016, a participant of the Olympic Games Beijing 2008, a bronze medalist of European Championship 2009, and four-time Polish Champion (2007, 2010, 2014, 2015).

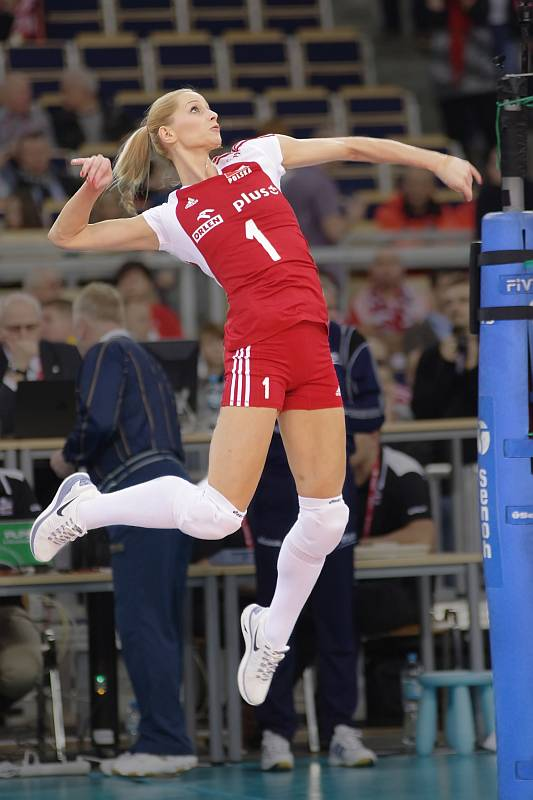
During the match Poland vs Spain at Atlas Arena in Łódź, Poland

== Personal life ==
On 19 June 2010 she married Sebastian Werbliński. In November 2017 she announced that she is expecting their first child.

Her sister Bogumiła (born 1986) is also a volleyball player.

== Career ==
=== National team ===
In October 2009 Werblińska won with her teammates the bronze medal of European Championship 2009 after winning a match against Germany. She took part in the first edition of the European Games. In the semifinals her national team beat Serbia and qualified to the final match. On 27 June 2015 Poland was beaten by Turkey, and Werblińska with her teammates won the silver medal.

== Sporting achievements ==
=== Clubs ===
==== CEV Cup ====
- 2012/2013 - with Bank BPS Muszynianka Fakro Muszyna

==== National championships ====
- 2005/2006 Polish Championship, with Winiary Kalisz
- 2006/2007 Polish Cup, with Winiary Kalisz
- 2006/2007 Polish Championship, with Winiary Kalisz
- 2007/2008 Polish Championship, with Winiary Kalisz
- 2008/2009 Polish Cup, with BKS Stal Bielsko-Biała
- 2008/2009 Polish Championship, with BKS Stal Bielsko-Biała
- 2009/2010 Polish Championship, with BKS Stal Bielsko-Biała
- 2010/2011 Polish SuperCup 2010, with BKS Stal Bielsko-Biała
- 2010/2011 Polish Championship, with BKS Stal Bielsko-Biała
- 2011/2012 Polish SuperCup 2011, with Bank BPS Muszynianka Fakro Muszyna
- 2011/2012 Polish Championship, with Bank BPS Muszynianka Fakro Muszyna
- 2012/2013 Polish Championship, with Bank BPS Muszynianka Fakro Muszyna
- 2013/2014 Polish Cup, with KPS Chemik Police
- 2013/2014 Polish Championship, with KPS Chemik Police
- 2014/2015 Polish SuperCup 2014, with KPS Chemik Police
- 2014/2015 Polish Championship, with KPS Chemik Police

=== National team ===
- 2001 CEV U18 European Championship
- 2001 FIVB U18 World Championship
- 2002 CEV U20 European Championship
- 2003 FIVB U20 World Championship
- 2009 CEV European Championship
- 2015 European Games

=== Individually ===
- 2001 CEV U18 European Championship - Best Spiker
- 2002 CEV U20 European Championship - Best Defender
- 2007 Polish Cup - Best Server
- 2009 Polish Cup - Most Valuable Player
- 2010 Polish Sportspersonality of the Year 2009 - 9th place
- 2013 CEV Cup - Best Receiver
- 2014 Polish Cup - Most Valuable Player
- 2014 Polish Championship - - Most Valuable Player
- 2015 Polish Cup - Best Receiver
