= 2014–15 CEV Women's Challenge Cup =

- League: CEV Women's Challenge Cup
- Sport: Volleyball
- Duration: 25 October 2014 – 12 April 2015
- Number of matches: 96
- Number of teams: 49

Finals
- Champions: (Turkey) Bursa BBSK
- Runners-up: (Russia) Uralochka-NTMK Ekaterinburg
- Finals MVP: (Turkey) Meryem Boz

CEV Women's Challenge Cup seasons
- ← 2013–14 2015–16 →

The 2014–15 CEV Women's Challenge Cup was the 35th edition of the European Challenge Cup volleyball club tournament, the former "CEV Cup".

== Format ==
The tournament was played on a knockout format, originally a total of 51 teams were to participate, due to withdraws a total of 49 teams participated. Initially 35 teams were allocated vacancies to enter the competition at the 'Qualification phase', with another 14 teams (after 2 teams withdraw) joining from the Women's CEV Cup entering the competition at the 'Main phase' stage (as per 'Round composition' below).

On 12 June 2014, a drawing of lots in Luxembourg City, Luxembourg, determined the team's pairing for each match. Each team played a home and an away match with result points awarded for each leg (3 points for 3–0 or 3–1 wins, 2 points for 3–2 win, 1 point for 2–3 loss). After two legs, the team with the most result points advanced to the next round. In case the teams were tied after two legs, a Golden Set was played immediately at the completion of the second leg. The Golden Set winner is the team that first obtains 15 points, provided that the points difference between the two teams is at least 2 points (thus, the Golden Set is similar to a tiebreak set in a normal match).

Round composition

- 1st Round: 6 teams
- 2nd Round: 1st Round winners (3 teams) + 29 teams
- 16th Final: 2nd Round winners (16 teams) + 14 teams from CEV Cup
- 8th Final onwards: winners

== Participating teams ==
- A total of 49 teams participated, 35 were allocated direct places and 14 joined from the Women's CEV Cup entering at the 'Main phase'.

Country	No. teams			Teams
Country	Vac	Cev	Total	Teams
Austria	3	2	5	ASKÖ Linz-Steg^{1} ATSC Sparkasse Klagenfurt^{1} SVS Post Schwechat; Ti Meraner Volley Innsbruck; UVC Holding Graz
Switzerland	2	2	4	Kanti Schaffhausen; Sagres Neuchâtel UC^{1} TSV Düdingen; Volley Köniz^{1}
Hungary	3	-	3	Linamar Békéscsabai RSE; Teva Gödöllõ; Vasas Obuda Budapest
Netherlands	3	-	3	Alterno Apeldoorn; Sliedrecht Sport; VC Sneek
Belgium	2	1	3	Asterix Kieldrecht; VC Oudegem; VDK Gent Dames^{1}
Romania	2	1	3	C.S.M. București; CSU Târgu Mureș; Dinamo Romprest București^{1}
Bosnia and Herzegovina	2	-	2	ŽOK Bimal-Jedinstvo Brčko; ŽOK Gacko
Greece	2	-	2	A.E.K. Athens; AON Pannaxiakos Naxos
Turkey	2	-	2	Bursa BBSK (5); İlbank Ankara (6)
France	1	1	2	ASPTT Mulhouse; Rocheville Le Cannet^{1}
Germany	1	1	2	Rote Raben Vilsbiburg^{1} Schweriner SC
Israel	1	1	2	Hapoel Kfar Saba; Haifa VC^{1}
Slovenia	1	1	2	Calcit Kamnik^{1} ŽOK Braslovče
Ukraine	-	2	2	Khimik Yuzhny^{1} Orbita ZTMC-ZNU Zaporozhye^{1}
Azerbaijan	1	-	1	Azerrail Baku (4)
Belarus	1	-	1	Minchanka Minsk
Bulgaria	1	-	1	Levski Sofia
Croatia	1	-	1	OK Poreč
Finland	1	-	1	Oriveden Ponnistus Orivesi
Luxembourg	1	-	1	RSR Walfer
Norway	1	-	1	Stod Volley Steinkjer
Russia	1	-	1	Uralochka-NTMK Ekaterinburg
Serbia	1	-	1	Jedinstvo Stara Pazova
Spain	1	-	1	CV Barcelona (3)
Czech Republic	-	1	1	SK UP Olomouc^{1}
Italy	-	1	1	Igor Gorgonzola Novara^{1}

1. Team qualified via CEV Cup entering the 16th Final.

== Qualification phase ==
=== 1st round ===
- 1st leg (Team #1 home) 25–26 October 2014
- 2nd leg (Team #2 home) 1–2 November 2014

Team #1	Results	Team #2
Teva Gödöllõ (Hungary)	3 – 0; 3 – 1	(Austria) SVS Post Schwechat
Sliedrecht Sport (Netherlands)	3 – 2; 3 – 2	(Hungary) Vasas Obuda Budapest
ŽOK Gacko (Bosnia and Herzegovina)	0 – 3; 0 – 3	(Turkey) İlbank Ankara

=== 2nd round ===
- 1st leg (Team #1 home) 11–13 November 2014
- 2nd leg (Team #2 home) 25–27 November 2014

Team #1	Results	Team #2
Bursa BBSK (Turkey)	3 – 0; 3 – 0	(Austria) UVC Holding Graz
A.E.K. Athens (Greece)	3 – 0; 0 – 3 Golden Set: 5–15	(Bosnia and Herzegovina) ŽOK Bimal-Jedinstvo Brčko
Linamar Békéscsabai RSE (Hungary)	3 – 1; 3 – 2	(Hungary) Teva Gödöllõ
OK Poreč (Croatia)	0 – 3; 0 – 3	(Serbia) Jedinstvo Stara Pazova
VC Oudegem (Belgium)	1 – 3; 0 – 3	(Germany) Schweriner SC
Asterix Kieldrecht (Belgium)	3 – 0; 3 – 1	(Spain) CV Barcelona
VC Sneek (Netherlands)	3 – 2; 0 – 3	(Netherlands) Alterno Apeldoorn
RSR Walfer (Luxembourg)	1 – 3; 0 – 3	(France) ASPTT Mulhouse
Ti Meraner Volley Innsbruck (Austria)	0 – 3; 0 – 3	(Azerbaijan) Azerrail Baku
Stod Volley Steinkjer (Norway)	3 – 0; 3 – 1	(Netherlands) Sliedrecht Sport
ŽOK Braslovče (Slovenia)	1 – 3; 1 – 3	(Switzerland) TSV Düdingen
Oriveden Ponnistus Orivesi (Finland)	3 – 2; 1 – 3	(Switzerland) Kanti Schaffhausen
C.S.U Târgu Mureș (Romania)	3 – 2; 1 – 3	(Israel) Hapoel Kfar Saba
Minchanka Minsk (Belarus)	3 – 1; 0 – 3 Golden Set: 10–15	(Greece) AON Pannaxiakos Naxos
İlbank Ankara (Turkey)	3 – 0; 3 – 0	(Bulgaria) Levski Sofia
Uralochka-NTMK Ekaterinburg (Russia)	3 – 1; 3 – 1	(Romania) C.S.M. București

== Main phase ==
In this stage of the competition, the sixteen qualified teams of the Qualification phase were joined by the losing teams from the 2014–15 Women's CEV Cup. From the 16 teams expected to join from the CEV Cup, 14 teams entered the competition, after the withdraw of 2 teams. That meant two teams received a 16th Final bye.

Qualified via the Qualification phase	Qualified via Women's CEV Cup
(Turkey) Bursa BBSK (Bosnia and Herzegovina) ŽOK Bimal-Jedinstvo Brčko (Hungary) Linamar Békéscsabai RSE (Serbia) Jedinstvo Stara Pazova (Germany) Schweriner SC (Belgium) Asterix Kieldrecht (Netherlands) Alterno Apeldoorn (France) ASPTT Mulhouse (Azerbaijan) Azerrail Baku (Norway) Stod Volley Steinkjer (Switzerland) TSV Düdingen (Switzerland) Kanti Schaffhausen (Israel) Hapoel Kfar Saba (Greece) AON Pannaxiakos Naxos (Turkey) İlbank Ankara (Russia) Uralochka-NTMK Ekaterinburg	(France) Rocheville Le Cannet (Belgium) VDK Gent Dames (Romania) Dinamo Romprest București (Switzerland) Volley Köniz (Israel) Haifa VC (Austria) ASKÖ Linz-Steg (Ukraine) Orbita ZTMC-ZNU Zaporozhye (Ukraine) Khimik Yuzhny (Switzerland) Sagres Neuchâtel UC (Czech Republic) SK UP Olomouc (Germany) Rote Raben Vilsbiburg (Slovenia) Calcit Kamnik (Austria) ATSC Sparkasse Klagenfurt (Italy) Igor Gorgonzola Novara

=== 16th Final ===
- 1st leg (Team #1 home) 9–11 December 2014
- 2nd leg (Team #2 home) 16–18 December 2014

Team #1	Results	Team #2
SK UP Olomouc (Czech Republic)	0 – 3; 0 – 3	(Turkey) Bursa BBSK
Orbita ZTMC-ZNU Zaporozhye (Ukraine)	3 – 0; 3 – 0	(Bosnia and Herzegovina) ŽOK Bimal-Jedinstvo Brčko
Bye	– –	(Hungary) Linamar Békéscsabai RSE
Rote Raben Vilsbiburg (Germany)	3 – 0; 1 – 3 Golden set: 15–13	(Serbia) Jedinstvo Stara Pazova
Schweriner SC (Germany)	– –	Bye
ATSC Sparkasse Klagenfurt (Austria)	0 – 3; 0 – 3	(Belgium) Asterix Kieldrecht
VDK Gent Dames (Belgium)	3 – 0; 0 – 3 Golden set: 10–15	(Netherlands) Alterno Apeldoorn
Igor Gorgonzola Novara (Italy)	3 – 0; 3 – 0	(France) ASPTT Mulhouse
Azerrail Baku (Azerbaijan)	3 – 0; 1 – 3 Golden set: 15–11	(Switzerland) Volley Köniz
Stod Volley Steinkjer (Norway)	3 – 0; 3 – 1	(Slovenia) Calcit Kamnik
TSV Düdingen (Switzerland)	0 – 3; 0 – 3	(Ukraine) Khimik Yuzhny
Haifa VC (Israel)	1 – 3; 1 – 3	(Switzerland) Kanti Schaffhausen
Rocheville Le Cannet (France)	3 – 0; 3 – 0	(Israel) Hapoel Kfar Saba
AON Pannaxiakos Naxos (Greece)	3 – 0; 2 – 3	(Switzerland) Sagres Neuchâtel UC
Dinamo Romprest București (Romania)	0 – 3; 1 – 3	(Turkey) İlbank Ankara
Uralochka-NTMK Ekaterinburg (Russia)	3 – 0; 3 – 0	(Austria) ASKÖ Linz-Steg

=== 8th Final ===
- 1st leg (Team #1 home) 13–15 January 2015
- 2nd leg (Team #2 home) 20–22 January 2015

Team #1	Results	Team #2
Bursa BBSK (Turkey)	3 – 0; 3 – 0	(Ukraine) Orbita ZTMC-ZNU Zaporozhye
Linamar Békéscsabai RSE (Hungary)	1 – 3; 0 – 3	(Germany) Rote Raben Vilsbiburg
Asterix Kieldrecht (Belgium)	0 – 3; 1 – 3	(Germany) Schweriner SC
Alterno Apeldoorn (Netherlands)	3 – 1; 0 – 3 Golden set: 5–15	(Italy) Igor Gorgonzola Novara
Stod Volley Steinkjer (Norway)	3 – 1; 0 – 3 Golden set: 18–16	(Azerbaijan) Azerrail Baku
Khimik Yuzhny (Ukraine)	3 – 0; 3 – 0	(Switzerland) Kanti Schaffhausen
AON Pannaxiakos Naxos (Greece)	3 – 0; 3 – 2	(France) Rocheville Le Cannet
İlbank Ankara (Turkey)	0 – 3; 0 – 3	(Russia) Uralochka-NTMK Ekaterinburg

=== 4th Final ===
- 1st leg (Team #1 home) 3–5 March 2015
- 2nd leg (Team #2 home) 10–12 March 2015

Team #1	Results	Team #2
Rote Raben Vilsbiburg (Germany)	0 – 3; 1 – 3	(Turkey) Bursa BBSK
Igor Gorgonzola Novara (Italy)	1 – 3; 2 – 3	(Germany) Schweriner SC
Stod Volley Steinkjer (Norway)	0 – 3; 0 – 3	(Ukraine) Khimik Yuzhny
AON Pannaxiakos Naxos (Greece)	0 – 3; 0 – 3	(Russia) Uralochka-NTMK Ekaterinburg

== Final phase ==
=== Semi-finals ===
- 1st leg (Team #1 home) 25 March 2015
- 2nd leg (Team #2 home) 29 March 2015

Team #1	Results	Team #2
Schweriner SC (Germany)	3 – 1; 0 – 3 Golden set: 10–15	(Turkey) Bursa BBSK
Uralochka-NTMK Ekaterinburg (Russia)	3 – 0; 3 – 0	(Ukraine) Khimik Yuzhny

=== Finals ===
- 1st leg (Team #1 home) 8 April 2015
- 2nd leg (Team #2 home) 12 April 2015

Team #1	Results	Team #2
Uralochka-NTMK Ekaterinburg (Russia)	3 – 0; 1 – 3 Golden set: 11–15	(Turkey) Bursa BBSK

2014–15 CEV Women's Challenge Cup Champions

Bursa BBSK
1st title

== Awards ==
Award	Winner	Team
MVP	(Turkey) Meryem Boz	(Turkey) Bursa BBSK
