= Turkey national beach volleyball team =

National beach volleyball team representing Turkey

The Turkey national beach volleyball team (Turkish: Türkiye Plaj Voleybolu Milli Takımı) is formed by the Turkish Volleyball Federation (TVF) and represents Turkey in international beach volleyball competitions by CEV and FIVB organizations.

== Men's ==
=== Tournament record ===
- 2015 Men's FIVB US$75,000 Lucerne Open, Switzerland, (bronze) .
- 2018–2020 CEV Beach Volleyball Continental Cup, did not advance from Ohase 2.

=== Notable players ===
- Murat Girginoğlu
- Volkan Göğtepe

== Tournament record ==
- 2023 CEV Women's Beach Volleyball Nations Cup.

=== Notable players ===
- Kezban Çağla Ateş
- Merve Çelebi
- Hümay Fırıncıoğlu
- Meliha İsmailoğlu
- Bahanur Şahin Gökalp
- Yeter Yalçın

== Women's U18/U19 ==
=== Tournament record ===
- 2024 FIVB Beach Volleyball U19 World Championships – Women's tournament, Shangluo, China, lost the round of 16.
- 2026 FIVB Beach Volleyball U18 World Championships – Women's tournament, The Hague, Netherlands, group fourth, failed to advance further.

== See also ==
- Turkey men's national volleyball team
- Turkey women's national volleyball team
