= Edgar Stakset =

Norwegian footballer (born 1937)

Personal information
- Date of birth: 30 April 1937 (age 89)
- Place of birth: Steinkjer, Norway
- Position: Midfielder

Senior career*
Years	Team	Apps	(Gls)
1957–1971	Steinkjer I&FK		
1972–1973	Beitstad		
1974	Steinkjer I&FK		
1975–1976	Stod		
1977	Verdal		

International career
1955	Norway U17	1	(0)
1959	Norway U21	2	(0)
1960–1964	Norway B	4	(0)
1960–1967	Norway	26	(0)

Managerial career
- 1968: Steinkjer I&FK (player-manager)
- 1972–1973: Beitstad (player-manager)
- 1975–1976: Steinkjer I&FK (youth)
- 1975–1976: Stod (player-manager)
- 1977–1978: Verdal
- 1979–1981: Sverre
- 1982: Henning
- * Club domestic league appearances and goals

Edgar Stakset (born 30 April 1937) is a Norwegian former footballer who played as a midfielder for Steinkjer FK. He made 26 appearances for the Norway national team from 1960 to 1967.

Stakset was the player-manager of Steinkjer in 1968. In 1972 he joined Beitstad as player-manager, and renewed his contract for another year. He went back to Steinkjer in 1974, being announced as their new youth coach after the 1974 season. At the same time, he would be player-manager for the fifth-tier team Stod IL. In 1977 he went on to manage Verdal IL. He also played during his first year. In 1979 he moved to Levanger club IL Sverre, and in 1982 IL Henning in rural Steinkjer.
