= Belgium national team =

The Belgian national team or Team Belgium may refer to any of a number of sports team representing the Belgium in international competitions.

== Badminton ==
- Belgium national badminton team

== Baseball ==
- Belgium national baseball team
- Belgium national under-18 baseball team

== Basketball ==
=== Men ===
- Belgium men's national basketball team
- Belgium men's national under-20 basketball team
- Belgium men's national under-18 basketball team
- Belgium men's national under-16 basketball team
- Belgium men's national 3x3 team

=== Women ===
- Belgium women's national basketball team
- Belgium women's national under-20 basketball team
- Belgium women's national under-18 and under-19 basketball team
- Belgium women's national under-16 and under-17 basketball team
- Belgium women's national 3x3 team

== Beach soccer ==
- Belgium national beach soccer team

== Bobsleigh ==
- Belgium national bobsleigh team

== Cricket ==
- Belgium national cricket team
- Belgium women's national cricket team
- Belgium national under-19 cricket team

== Field hockey ==
=== Men ===
- Belgium men's national field hockey team
- Belgium men's national under-21 field hockey team

=== Women ===
- Belgium women's national field hockey team
- Belgium women's national under-21 field hockey team

== Football ==
=== Men ===
- Belgium national football team
- Belgium national football B team
- Belgium national under-21 football team
- Belgium national under-19 football team
- Belgium national under-18 football team
- Belgium national under-17 football team

=== Women ===
- Belgium women's national football team
- Belgium women's national under-19 football team
- Belgium women's national under-17 football team

== Futsal ==
- Belgium national futsal team
- Belgium women's national futsal team

== Gymnastics ==
- Belgium women's national artistic gymnastics team

== Goalball ==
- Belgium men's national goalball team
- Belgium women's national goalball team

== Handball ==
- Belgium men's national handball team
- Belgium women's national handball team

== Ice hockey ==
=== Men ===
- Belgium men's national ice hockey team
- Belgium men's national junior ice hockey team
- Belgium men's national under-18 ice hockey team

=== Women ===
- Belgium women's national ice hockey team
- Belgium women's national under-18 ice hockey team

== Korfball ==
- Belgium national korfball team

== Quidditch ==
- Belgium national quidditch team

== Racquetball ==
- Belgium national racquetball team

== Relay ==
- Belgian men's 4 × 400 metres relay team

== Roller derby ==
- Belgium national roller derby team

== Rugby league ==
- Belgium national rugby league team

== Rugby union ==
=== Men ===
- Belgium national rugby union team
- Belgium national rugby sevens team

=== Women ===
- Belgium women's national rugby union team
- Belgium women's national rugby sevens team

== Softball ==
- Belgium men's national softball team
- Belgium women's national softball team

== Squash ==
- Belgium women's national squash team

== Tennis ==
- Belgium Davis Cup team
- Belgium Billie Jean King Cup team

== Volleyball ==
=== Men ===
- Belgium men's national volleyball team
- Belgium men's national under-21 volleyball team
- Belgium men's national under-19 volleyball team

=== Women ===
- Belgium women's national volleyball team
- Belgium women's national under-23 volleyball team
- Belgium women's national under-21 volleyball team
- Belgium women's national under-19 volleyball team

== Water polo ==
- Belgium men's national water polo team
- Belgium women's national water polo team

== See also ==
- Category:National sports teams of Belgium
