= Division of Honour =

Division of Honour may refer to:

- Luxembourg Division of Honour, the second-level football league in Luxembourg
- Division of Honour (Belgium), the top-level league for women's volleyball in Belgium
