= Belgium women's national under-23 volleyball team =

Young female national volleyball team from Belgium

Belgium U23
- Association: Koninklijk Belgisch Volleybalverbond (KBVBV)
- Confederation: CEV

Uniforms
Home	Away

FIVB U23 World Championship
- Appearances: None
- Top Volley Belgium

The Belgium women's national under-23 volleyball team represents Belgium in international women's volleyball competitions and friendly matches under the age 23 and it is ruled and managed by the Belgium Royal Volleyball Federation That is an affiliate of International Volleyball Federation FIVB and also a part of European Volleyball Confederation CEV.

== Results ==
=== FIVB U23 World Championship ===
Champions Runners up Third place Fourth place

FIVB U23 World Championship
Year	Round	Position	Pld	W	L	SW	SL	Squad
(Mexico) 2013	Didn't Qualify							
(Turkey) 2015	Didn't Qualify							
(Slovenia) 2017	Didn't Qualify							
Total	0 Titles	0/3						

== Team ==
=== Current squad ===
The Following list include Belgium women's under-20 team that also represent the under 23 national team.

- Head coach : (Belgium) Callens Fien

Name	Date of birth	Height	Current club
Coppin Charlotte	1 December 1998	1.86 m (6 ft 1 in)	(Belgium) Asterix Kieldrecht
De Donder Sara	11 February 2000	1.75 m (5 ft 9 in)	(Belgium) TSV Vilvoorde
De Quick Lotte	11 January 1998	1.72 m (5 ft 8 in)	(Belgium) VDK Gent Dames
Moulin Oriane	18 February 2000	1.81 m (5 ft 11 in)	(Belgium) Tchalou
Coppens Hanne	7 May 1998	1.84 m (6 ft 0 in)	(Belgium) Asterix Kieldrecht
Kindi Bieke	11 February 2000	1.91 m (6 ft 3 in)	(Belgium) TSV Vilvoorde
Peeters Elien	26 April 1999	1.82 m (6 ft 0 in)	(Belgium) TSV Vilvoorde
Van Avermaet Silke	6 February 1999	1.92 m (6 ft 4 in)	(Belgium) Asterix Kieldrecht
Verlinden Marie-Hélène	6 February 1999	1.86 m (6 ft 1 in)	(Belgium) TSV Vilvoorde
Claes Laura	31 March 1998	1.80 m (5 ft 11 in)	(Belgium) Datovoc Tongeren
De Paepe Nikita	22 February 2001	1.82 m (6 ft 0 in)	(Belgium) TSV Vilvoorde
De Sloover Manon	22 November 1999	1.81 m (5 ft 11 in)	(Belgium) TSV Vilvoorde
Devos Janne	25 May 1999	1.79 m (5 ft 10 in)	(Belgium) TSV Vilvoorde
D’hondt Justine	8 July 1999	1.78 m (5 ft 10 in)	(Belgium) TSV Vilvoorde
Flament Laure	18 June 1998	1.82 m (6 ft 0 in)	(Belgium) TSV Vilvoorde
Herbots Britt	24 September 1999	1.82 m (6 ft 0 in)	(Belgium) Asterix Kieldrecht
Maertens Louka	11 January 2000	1.83 m (6 ft 0 in)	(Belgium) TSV Vilvoorde
Stragiers Manon	12 March 1999	1.83 m (6 ft 0 in)	(Belgium) Asterix Kieldrecht
Vanassche Felice	28 July 2000	1.83 m (6 ft 0 in)	(Belgium) TSV Vilvoorde
Vleminckx Yasmine	24 January 1999	1.83 m (6 ft 0 in)	(Belgium) TSV Vilvoorde
De Tant Amber	22 March 1998	1.77 m (5 ft 10 in)	(Belgium) Asterix Kieldrecht
Goossens Sofie	22 October 2001	1.74 m (5 ft 9 in)	(Belgium) TSV Vilvoorde
Rampelberg Britt	5 June 2000	1.63 m (5 ft 4 in)	(Belgium) TSV Vilvoorde
Valkenborg Anna	4 January 1998	1.74 m (5 ft 9 in)	(Belgium) Asterix Kieldrecht
