= 2014–15 Women's CEV Cup =

- League: Women's CEV Cup
- Sport: Volleyball

Finals
- Champions: (Russia) Dinamo Krasnodar
- Finals MVP: (Russia) Tatiana Kosheleva

Women's CEV Cup seasons
- ← 2013–14 2015–16 →

The 2014–15 Women's CEV Cup was the 43rd edition of the European CEV Cup volleyball club tournament, the former "Top Teams Cup".

== Participating teams ==
Rank	Country	The number of teams	Teams
1	Turkey	1	Galatasaray Daikin Istanbul (4)
2	Russia	1	Dinamo Krasnodar
3	Italy	2	Prosecco Doc-Imoco Conegliano; Igor Gorgonzola Novara
4	Azerbaijan	2	Igtisadchi Baku (3); Lokomotiv Baku (5)
5	France	2	Béziers Volley; Rocheville Le Cannet
6	Poland	2	PGE Atom Trefl Sopot; Tauron MKS Dąbrowa Górnicza
7	Germany	1	Rote Raben Vilsbiburg
8	Switzerland	2	Volley Köniz; Sagres Neuchâtel UC
9	Romania	2	Dinamo Romprest București; CS Volei Alba Blaj
10	Serbia	1	Crvena Zvezda Beograd
11	Czech Republic	2	SK UP Olomouc; Královo Pole Brno
12	Austria	2	Askö Linz-Steg; ATSC Sparkasse Klagenfurt
13	Belgium	3	Dauphines Charleroi; VDK Gent Dames; Gea Happel Amigos Zoersel
15	Slovenia	2	Nova KBM Branik Maribor; Calcit Kamnik
16	Finland	1	HPK Hämeenlinna
17	Greece	1	Olympiacos Piraeus
18	Spain	1	Naturhouse Ciudad de Logroño (1)
19	Ukraine	3	Khimik Yuzhny; Severodonchonka Severodonec; Orbita ZTMC-ZNU Zaporozhye
24	Israel	1	Haifa Volleyball

== Main phase ==
=== 16th Final ===
- 1st leg 11–13 November 2014
- 2nd leg 25–27 November 2014

Team #1	Results	Team #2
Galatasaray Daikin Istanbul (Turkey)	3 – 0; 3 – 2	(France) Rocheville Le Cannet
Olympiacos Piraeus (Greece)	0 – 3; 3 – 0 Golden Set: 15–7	(Belgium) VDK Gent Dames
Dinamo Romprest București (Romania)	1 – 3; 2 – 3	(Poland) Tauron MKS Dąbrowa Górnicza
Volley Köniz (Switzerland)	3 – 2; 0 – 3	(Romania) CS Volei Alba Blaj
Haifa Volleyball (Israel)	3 – 2; 0 – 3	(France) Béziers Volley
Královo Pole Brno (Czech Republic)	3 – 1; 3 – 1	(Austria) Askö Linz-Steg
Orbita ZTMC-ZNU Zaporozhye (Ukraine)	2 – 3; 2 – 3	(Belgium) Dauphines Charleroi
Naturhouse Ciudad de Logroño (Spain)	3 – 0; 3 – 0	(Azerbaijan) Igtisadchi Baku
Khimik Yuzhny (Ukraine)	1 – 3; 1 – 3	(Italy) Prosecco Doc-Imoco Conegliano
Nova KBM Branik Maribor (Slovenia)	3 – 2; 3 – 2	(Switzerland) Sagres Neuchâtel UC
SK UP Olomouc (Czech Republic)	3 – 2; 1 – 3	(Belgium) Gea Happel Amigos Zoersel
PGE Atom Trefl Sopot (Poland)	3 – 0; 3 – 0	(Ukraine) Severodonchonka Severodonec
Rote Raben Vilsbiburg (Germany)	0 – 3; 1 – 3	(Azerbaijan) Lokomotiv Baku
Calcit Kamnik (Slovenia)	0 – 3; 1 – 3	(Serbia) Crvena Zvezda Beograd
ATSC Sparkasse Klagenfurt (Austria)	0 – 3; 1 – 3	(Finland) HPK Hämeenlinna
Igor Gorgonzola Novara (Italy)	1 – 3; 2 – 3	(Russia) Dinamo Krasnodar

Notes

1. Igtisadchi Baku withdrew from the competition.
2. Severodonchonka Severodonec withdrew from the competition.

=== 8th Final ===
- 1st leg 9–11 December 2014
- 2nd leg 16–18 December 2014

Team #1	Results	Team #2
Galatasaray Daikin Istanbul (Turkey)	3 – 1; 3 – 0	(Greece) Olympiacos Piraeus
Tauron MKS Dąbrowa Górnicza (Poland)	3 – 1; 2 – 3	(Romania) CS Volei Alba Blaj
Béziers Volley (France)	3 – 0; 3 – 0	(Czech Republic) Královo Pole Brno
Dauphines Charleroi (Belgium)	1 – 3; 0 – 3	(Spain) Naturhouse Ciudad de Logroño
Prosecco Doc-Imoco Conegliano (Italy)	3 – 0; 2 – 3	(Slovenia) Nova KBM Branik Maribor
PGE Atom Trefl Sopot (Poland)	3 – 0; 3 – 0	(Belgium) Gea Happel Amigos Zoersel
Crvena Zvezda Beograd (Serbia)	0 – 3; 1 – 3	(Azerbaijan) Lokomotiv Baku
Dinamo Krasnodar (Russia)	3 – 0; 3 – 0	(Finland) HPK Hämeenlinna

=== 4th Final ===
- 1st leg 13–15 January 2015
- 2nd leg 20–22 January 2015

Team #1	Results	Team #2
Tauron MKS Dąbrowa Górnicza (Poland)	3 – 2; 0 – 3	(Turkey) Galatasaray Daikin Istanbul
Naturhouse Ciudad de Logroño (Spain)	0 – 3; 0 – 3	(France) Béziers Volley
Prosecco Doc-Imoco Conegliano (Italy)	3 – 1; 0 – 3 Golden Set: 9–15	(Poland) PGE Atom Trefl Sopot
Lokomotiv Baku (Azerbaijan)	3 – 0; 0 – 3 Golden Set: 13–15	(Russia) Dinamo Krasnodar

== Challenge phase ==
- 1st leg 3–5 March 2015
- 2nd leg 10–12 March 2015

Team #1	Results	Team #2
Dinamo Krasnodar (Russia)	3 – 0; 3 – 0	(France) Nantes VB
Béziers Volley (France)	1 – 3; 0 – 3	(Azerbaijan) Rabita Baku
Omichka Omsk Region (Russia)	3 – 0; 1 – 3 Golden Set: 12–15	(Turkey) Galatasaray Daikin Istanbul
Ştiinţa Bacău (Romania)	0 – 3; 0 – 3	(Poland) PGE Atom Trefl Sopot

== Final phase ==
=== Semifinals ===
- 1st leg 24 March 2015
- 2nd leg 28 March 2015

Team #1	Results	Team #2
Dinamo Krasnodar (Russia)	3 – 1; 3 – 0	(Azerbaijan) Rabita Baku
PGE Atom Trefl Sopot (Poland)	3 – 0; 3 – 2	(Turkey) Galatasaray Daikin Istanbul

=== Final ===
- 1st leg 7 April 2015
- 2nd leg 11 April 2015

Team #1	Results	Team #2
Dinamo Krasnodar (Russia)	3 – 0; 1 – 3 Golden Set: 15–10	(Poland) PGE Atom Trefl Sopot

== Awards ==
Award	Winner	Team
MVP	(Russia) Tatiana Kosheleva	(Russia) Dinamo Krasnodar

== See also ==
- Women's CEV Cup 2013–14
