= Lies Eykens =

Belgian volleyball player (born 1989)

Personal information
- Nationality: Belgian
- Born: 3 March 1989 (age 37)
- Height: 180 cm (71 in)
- Weight: 66 kg (146 lb)
- Spike: 285 cm (112 in)
- Block: 275 cm (108 in)

Volleyball information
- Number: 13 (national team)

Career
Years	Teams
2015	Amigos Zoersel

National team
2015	Belgium

Lies Eykens (born 3 March 1989) is a Belgian female volleyball player. She is part of the Belgium women's national volleyball team.

She participated in the 2015 FIVB Volleyball World Grand Prix. On club level she played for Amigos Zoersel in 2015.
