= Zoersel =

- Municipality
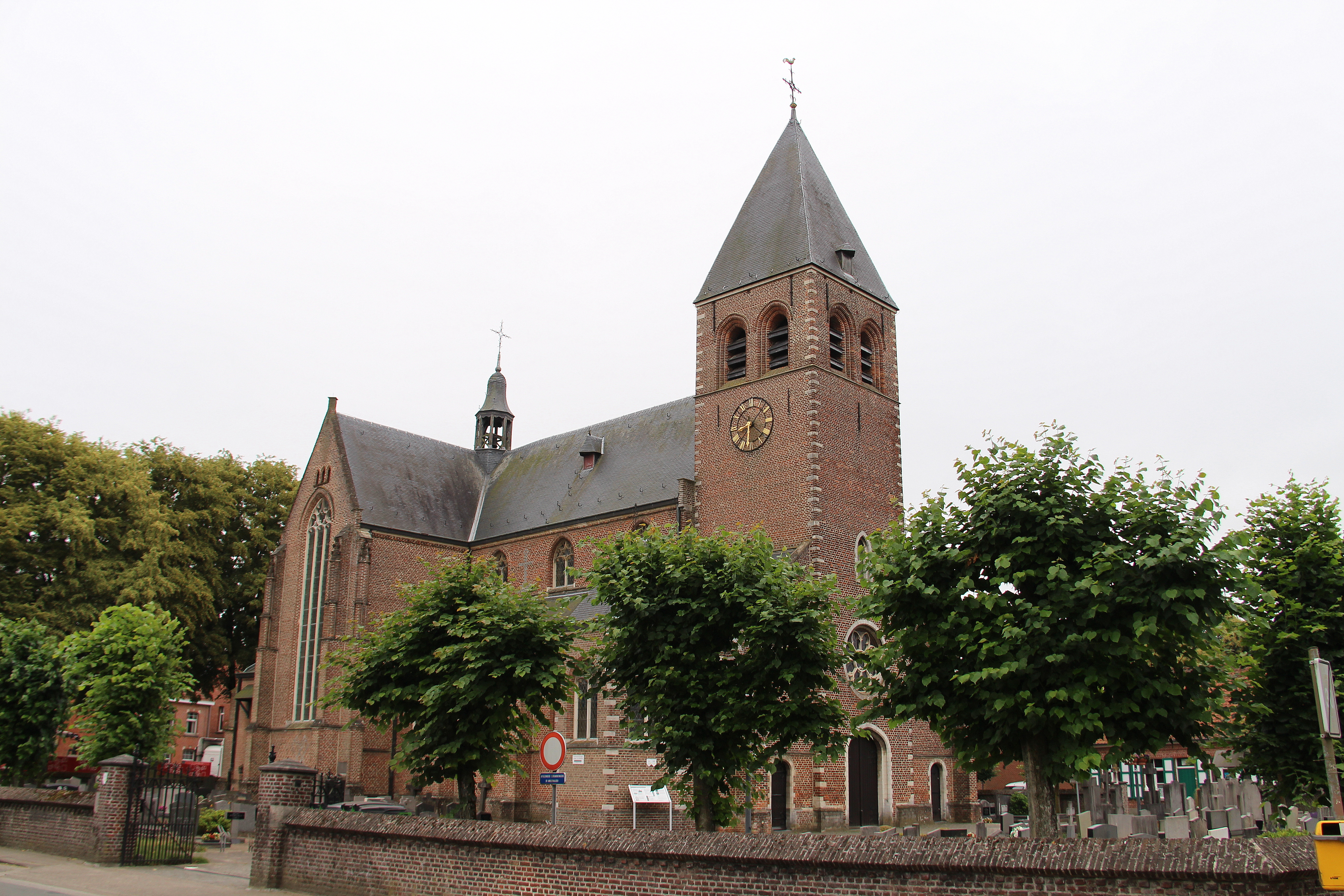

- Flag Coat of arms

- Location of Zoersel in the province of Antwerp
- Interactive map of Zoersel
- Location in Belgium
- Coordinates: 51°16′N 04°42′E
- Country: Belgium
- Community: Flemish Community
- Region: Flemish Region
- Province: Antwerp
- Arrondissement: Antwerp

Government
  - Mayor: Liesbeth Verstreken (N-VA)
  - Governing parties: N-VA, Groen, Open Vld

Area
  - Total: 38.68 km^{2} (14.93 sq mi)

Population (2018-01-01)
  - Total: 21,739
  - Density: 562.0/km^{2} (1,456/sq mi)
- Postal codes: 2980
- NIS code: 11055
- Area codes: 03
- Website: www.zoersel.be

Zoersel (Dutch pronunciation: [ˈzuːrsəl]) is a municipality located in the Belgian province of Antwerp. The municipality comprises the towns of Halle, St. Antonius, and Zoersel proper. In 2021, Zoersel had a total population of 22,142. The total area is 38.65 km^{2}.

== Sports ==
The women's A squad of volleyball club Gea Happel Amigos Zoersel plays at the highest level of the Belgian league pyramid.
