= Hümay Fırıncıoğlu =

Turkish volleyball player (born 1996)

Hümay Fırıncıoğlu (2024)

Hümay Fırıncıoğlu (born 3 August 1996) is a Turkish professional volleyball player who plays as a spiker for the Sultans League team PTT. She grew up in the Yeşilyurt infrastructure and played for Yeşilyurt A team, TVF Sports High School, Beşiktaş, Nilüfer Belediyespor and Kuzeyboru.

== Career ==
- (Turkey) Yeşilyurt (altyapı)
- (Turkey) TVF Spor Lisesi (2011–13)
- (Turkey) Yeşilyurt (2013–16)
- (Turkey) Beşiktaş (2016–19)
  - (Turkey) Türk Hava Yolları (2017–18)
- (Turkey) Nilüfer Belediyespor (2019–20)
- (Turkey) Kuzeyboru (2020–21)
- (Turkey) Nilüfer Belediyespor (2021–23)
- (Turkey) PTT (2023–24)

== Honours ==
=== Club ===
- Beşiktaş: 2017–18 BVA Cup – Winner

=== National team ===
- 2015 European Women's Volleyball League – Runners-up
- Volleyball at the 2017 Islamic Solidarity Games – Runners-up
