= Britt Ruysschaert =

Belgian volleyball player

Personal information
- Nationality: Belgium
- Born: 27 May 1994 (age 32)
- Height: 1.77 m (5 ft 10 in)
- Weight: 62 kg (137 lb)
- Spike: 302 cm (119 in)
- Block: 281 cm (111 in)

Volleyball information
- Number: 18

Career
Years	Teams
2015	(Belgium) Asterix Kieldrecht
Honours
Women's volleyball
Representing Belgium
European Championships
Bronze medal – third place	2013 Germany	Team

Britt Ruysschaert (born 27 May 1994) is a Belgian volleyball player. She is a member of the Belgium women's national volleyball team and played for Asterix Kieldrecht in 2014.

She was part of the Belgian national team at the 2014 FIVB Volleyball Women's World Championship in Italy, and the 2016 FIVB Volleyball World Grand Prix.

== Clubs ==
- (Belgium) Asterix Kieldrecht (2011–2017)
- Antwerp Ladies (2017-now)
