= Alterno =

Dutch volleyball club

Dros-Alterno Apeldoorn
- Full name: Volleybalvereniging (VV) Alterno Apeldoorn
- Short name: Alterno
- Founded: 1973
- Ground: Alternohal, Apeldoorn, Netherlands
- Chairman: Henk Wijnsma
- League: Eredivisie Dames
- Website: Club home page

Uniforms
| Home | Away |

VV Alterno is a Dutch volleyball club based in Apeldoorn. It has professional and amateur teams (men, women, youth and sitting volleyball) with the women's team being the most successful and currently playing in the Eredivisie Dames, the highest level in the Netherlands.

== Previous names ==
Due to sponsorship, the club have competed under the following names:

- Alterno (1973–1998)
- Middelink Alterno (1998–1999)
- Dros Alterno (1999–2010)
- Alterno (2010–2014)
- Coolen Alterno (2014–2018)
- Dros-Alterno (2018–present)

== History ==
Founded on 27 June 1973, its main teams (men and women) started playing in the second division, with both being relegated and promoted between the second and lower divisions throughout the years. In 2005 the women's team reached the highest division (Eredivisie) for the first time and were runners-up of the 2009 Dutch Cup. In 2013 the women's team won the Dutch Cup and claimed the Eredivisie title in the following year (2014). As a result, the team qualified for European competitions, participating in the CEV Women's Challenge Cup (in 2013–14 and 2014–15). The team reached the finals of the 2017–18 Eredivisie season and became the season's runners-up.

The men's team reached the highest division (Eredivisie) for the first time in 2015.

Besides its main teams, the club also has youth teams and a sitting volleyball team, with a total of over 70 teams in all categories and more than 700 athletes. The youth teams were awarded 'Best Volleybal Youth Training in the Netherlands' in 2006, 2012, 2013 and 2014, while the sitting volleyball won the national championship in 2012.

== Honours ==
=== National competitions ===
Women

- Eredivisie: 1

2013–14

- Dutch Cup: 1

2012–13
