= 2013–14 Women's CEV Cup =

- League: Women's CEV Cup
- Sport: Volleyball

Regular Season

Final
- Champions: (Turkey) Fenerbahçe
- Runners-up: (Russia) Uralochka-NTMK Ekaterinburg
- Finals MVP: (South Korea) Kim Yeon-koung

Women's CEV Cup seasons
- ← 2012–13 2014–15 →

The 2013–14 Women's CEV Cup was the 42nd edition of the European CEV Cup volleyball club tournament, the former Top Teams Cup.

== Teams of the 2013–2014 season ==
Rank	Country	The number of teams	Teams	
1	Austria	2	Askö Linz-Steg	SVS Post Schwechat
2	Azerbaijan	2	Azerrail Baku	Lokomotiv Baku
3	Belgium	2	Asterix Kieldrecht	VC Oudegem
4	Czech Republic	2	Kralovo Pole Brno	Sk Up Olomouc
5	France	2	ASPTT Mulhouse	Sf Paris Saint Cloud
6	Greece	2	A.E.K. Athens	Olympiacos Piraeus
7	Israel	2	Haifa Volleyball	Hapoel Kfar Saba
8	Poland	2	Aluprof Bielsko-Biala	Polski Cukier Fakro Muszyna
9	Switzerland	2	Kanti Schaffhausen	Volley Köniz
10	Turkey	2	Bursa BBSK	Fenerbahçe
11	Ukraine	2	Khimik Yuzhny	Orbita-Ztmc-Znu Zaporozhye
13	Belarus	1	Atlant Baranovichi	
12	Bosnia and Herzegovina	1	Zok Jedinstvo Brcko	
14	Croatia	1	Ok Porec	
15	Finland	1	Lp Salo	
16	Germany	1	Rote Raben Vilsbiburg	
17	Netherlands	1	Irmato Weert	
19	Serbia	1	Partizan Vizura Beograd	
18	Slovenia	1	Nova KBM Branik Maribor	
20	Romania	1	Volei 2004 Constanța	
21	Russia	1	Uralochka-NTMK Ekaterinburg	

== Main phase ==
=== 1/16 Finals ===
- 1st leg 22–23 October 2013
- 2nd leg 29–30 October 2013

The 16 winning teams from the 1/16 Finals will compete in the 1/8 Finals playing Home & Away matches. The losers of the 1/16 Final matches will qualify for the 3rd round in Challenge Cup.

Team #1	Results	Team #2
Bursa BBSK (Turkey)	0 – 3 (20-25, 19–25, 13–25); 0 – 3 (12-25, 18–25, 21–25)	(Turkey) Fenerbahçe
Irmato Weert (Netherlands)	1 – 3 (25-18, 11–25, 13–25, 13–25); 3 – 2 (25-20, 14–25, 26–24, 21–25, 15–13)	(Ukraine) Orbita-Ztmc-Znu Zaporozhye
Kanti Schaffhausen (Switzerland)	0 – 3 (19-25, 18–25, 8-25); 2 – 3 (11-25, 25–23, 21–25, 25–23, 10–15)	(Finland) Lp Salo
Rote Raben Vilsbiburg (Germany)	3 – 1 (25-20, 23–25, 25–14, 25–18); 3 – 0 (25-16, 25–10, 25–17)	(Bosnia and Herzegovina) Zok Jedinstvo Brcko
Lokomotiv Baku (Azerbaijan)	3 – 0 (25-20, 25–12, 25–17); 3 – 0 (25-21, 25–22, 25–20)	(Czech Republic) Kralovo Pole Brno
Hapoel Kfar Saba (Israel)	3 – 1 (25-21, 24–26, 25–22, 25–18); 3 – 2 (16-25, 25–21, 12–25, 25–20, 15–12)	(Croatia) Ok Porec
A.E.K. Athens (Greece)	3 – 2 (25-21, 25–20, 22–25, 21–25, 15–8); 1 – 3 (23-25, 25–23, 12–25, 15–25)	(Austria) SVS Post Schwechat
Haifa Volleyball (Israel)	1 – 3 (18-25, 13–25, 25–22, 9-25); 0 – 3 (16-25, 12–25, 15–25)	(Poland) Polski Cukier Fakro Muszyna
ASPTT Mulhouse (France)	3 – 0 (25-21, 25–20, 25–11); 0 – 3 (18-25, 17–25, 24–26); Golden Set: 15-17	(Poland) Aluprof Bielsko-Biala
Olympiacos Piraeus (Greece)	3 – 0 (25-23, 29–27, 26–24); 3 – 1 (25-23, 18–25, 27–25, 26–24)	(France) Sf Paris Saint Cloud
VC Oudegem (Belgium)	2 – 3 (26-28, 25–23, 15–25, 25–23, 13–15); 1 – 3 (25-23, 11–25, 16–25, 20–25)	(Ukraine) Khimik Yuzhny
Volei 2004 Constanța (Romania)	0 – 3 (23-25, 12–25, 12–25); 0 – 3 (5-25, 12–25, 10–25)	(Belarus) Atlant Baranovichi
Partizan Vizura Beograd (Serbia)	3 – 2 (25-20, 25–15, 18–25, 22–25, 16–14); 1 – 3 (9-25, 25–21, 17–25, 19–25)	(Azerbaijan) Azerrail Baku
Sk Up Olomouc (Czech Republic)	3 – 0 (25-10, 25–13, 25–12); 3 – 0 (25-20, 25–10, 25–18)	(Austria) Askö Linz-Steg
Nova KBM Branik Maribor (Slovenia)	1 – 3 (12-25, 23–25, 25–16, 27–29); 0 – 3 (18-25, 20–25, 19–25)	(Switzerland) Volley Köniz
Uralochka-NTMK Ekaterinburg (Russia)	3 – 0 (25-10, 25–21, 25–23); 3 – 1 (25-11, 25–23, 23–25, 25–19)	(Belgium) Asterix Kieldrecht

=== 1/8 Finals ===
- 1st leg 4–5 December 2013
- 2nd leg 10–11 December 2013

Team #1	Results	Team #2
Fenerbahçe (Turkey)	3 – 0 (25-22, 25–14, 25–16); 3 – 0 (25-14, 25–10, 25–22)	(Ukraine) Orbita-Ztmc-Znu Zaporozhye
Lp Salo (Finland)	3 – 1 (26-24, 20–25, 25–23, 25–14); 2 – 3 (24-26, 25–13, 25–23, 12–25, 7–15)	(Germany) Rote Raben Vilsbiburg
Lokomotiv Baku (Azerbaijan)	3 – 0 (25-16, 25–19, 25–14); 3 – 0 (25-18, 25–14, 25–11)	(Israel) Hapoel Kfar Saba
SVS Post Schwechat (Austria)	1 – 3 (25-22, 24–26, 16–25, 27–29); 0 – 3 (22-25,24-26,8-25)	(Poland) Polski Cukier Fakro Muszyna
Olympiacos Piraeus (Greece)	0 – 3 (23-25,25-27,22-25); 3 – 2 (20-25, 23–25, 25–18, 25–16, 15–11)	(Poland) Aluprof Bielsko-Biala
Khimik Yuzhny (Ukraine)	3 – 0(25-21, 25–18, 25–21); 3 – 0 (28-26, 25–22, 25–16)	(Belarus) Atlant Baranovichi
Azerrail Baku (Azerbaijan)	3 – 0 (25-21, 25–19, 25–20); 3 – 2 (25-27, 22–25, 25–19, 25–13, 15–10)	(Czech Republic) Sk Up Olomouc
Volley Köniz (Switzerland)	0 – 3 (20-25,22-25,24-26); 0 – 3 (12-25,16-25,18-25)	(Russia) Uralochka-NTMK Ekaterinburg

=== 1/4 Finals ===
- 1st leg 14–15 January 2014
- 2nd leg 22–23 January 2014

Team #1	Results	Team #2
Lp Salo (Finland)	0 – 3 (22-25, 13–25, 9-25); 0 – 3 (21-25, 25–27, 14–25)	(Turkey) Fenerbahçe
Polski Cukier Fakro Muszyna (Poland)	3 – 0 (25-15, 25–23, 26–24); 3 – 2 (26-24, 14–25, 25–21, 18–25, 15–12)	(Azerbaijan) Lokomotiv Baku
Khimik Yuzhny (Ukraine)	3 – 0 (25-17, 25–18, 25–20); 0 – 3 (24-26, 19–25, 16–25); Golden Set: 15-12	(Poland) Aluprof Bielsko-Biala
Azerrail Baku (Azerbaijan)	1 – 3 (25-22, 23–25, 13–25, 16–25); 1 – 3 (28-30, 18–25, 25–21, 13–25)	(Russia) Uralochka-NTMK Ekaterinburg

== Challenge Phase ==
- Teams from CEV Women's Champions League: Agel Prostějov, Azeryol Baku, Dresdner SC, Dinamo Romprest București
- Teams from Main phase: Fenerbahçe, Polski Cukier Fakro Muszyna, Khimik Yuzhny, Uralochka-NTMK Ekaterinburg
- 1st leg 4–5 February 2014
- 2nd leg 11–12 February 2014

Team #1	Results	Team #2
Agel Prostějov (Czech Republic)	0 – 3 (11-25, 21–25, 15–25); 0 – 3 (20-25, 17–25, 15–25)	(Turkey) Fenerbahçe
Polski Cukier Fakro Muszyna (Poland)	3 – 2 (25-20, 22–25, 22–25, 28–26, 15–13); 0 – 3 (21-25, 10–25, 19–25)	(Azerbaijan) Azeryol Baku
Khimik Yuzhny (Ukraine)	1 – 3 (25-18, 21–25, 22–25, 20–25); 3 – 1 (25-21, 21–25, 25–18, 25–23); Golden Set: 16-18	(Germany) Dresdner SC
Uralochka-NTMK Ekaterinburg (Russia)	3 – 0 (25-19, 25–20, 25–20); 2 – 3 (20-25, 26–24, 25–22, 21–25, 13–15)	(Romania) Dinamo Romprest București

== Final phase ==
=== Semi-finals ===
- 1st leg 25 February 2014
- 2nd leg 1 March 2014

Team #1	Results	Team #2
Fenerbahçe (Turkey)	3 – 0 (25-14, 25–12, 25–16); 3 - 0 (25-8, 25–17, 25–17)	(Azerbaijan) Azeryol Baku
Uralochka-NTMK Ekaterinburg (Russia)	2 – 3 (26-28, 25–15, 20–25, 25–22, 7–15); 3 – 1 (25-19, 19–25, 25–18, 25–23)	(Germany) Dresdner SC

=== Finals ===
- 1st leg 26 March 2014
- 2nd leg 29 March 2014

Team #1	Results	Team #2
Uralochka-NTMK Ekaterinburg (Russia)	2 – 3 (16-25, 17–25, 25–20, 25–23, 9–15); 0 - 3 (11-25, 26–28, 22–25)	(Turkey) Fenerbahçe

Women's CEV Cup 2013–14 Champions

Fenerbahçe
1st title
