= 2012–13 Women's CEV Cup =

- League: Women's CEV Cup
- Sport: Volleyball

Regular Season

Final
- Champions: (Poland) Bank BPS Fakro Muszyna
- Runners-up: (Turkey) Fenerbahçe

Women's CEV Cup seasons
- ← 2011–12 2013–14 →

The 2012–13 Women's CEV Cup was the 41st edition of the European CEV Cup volleyball club tournament, the former Top Teams Cup.

== Teams of the 2012–2013 ==
Rank	Country	The number of teams	Teams	
1	Austria	2	Askö Linz-Steg	SVS Post Schwechat
2	Azerbaijan	2	Azeryol Baku	Igtisadchi Baku
3	Belgium	2	Asterix Kieldrecht	Dauphines Charleroi
4	Croatia	2	ŽOK Rijeka	Zok Split 1700
5	Czech Republic	2	Kralovo Pole Brno	Sk Up Olomouc
6	France	2	Beziers VB	Ses Calais
7	Netherlands	2	Irmato Weert	Sliedrecht Sport
8	Poland	2	AZS Bialystok	Aluprof Bielsko-Biala
9	Switzerland	2	Sagres Neuchatel	Volley Köniz
10	Turkey	2	TED Ankara Kolejliler	Fenerbahçe
11	Ukraine	2	Khimik Yuzhny	Kontynium Volyn Lutsk
12	Albania	1	Minatori Rreshen	
13	Bosnia and Herzegovina	1	Jedinstvo Brcko	
14	Finland	1	Lp Salo	
15	Germany	1	Rote Raben Vilsbiburg	
16	Greece	1	A.E.K. Athens	
17	Italy	1	Rebecchin Meccanica Piacenza	
18	Serbia	1	TENT Obrenovac	
19	Slovenia	1	Nova KBM Branik Maribor	
20	Romania	1	Stiinta Bacau	
21	Russia	1	Omichka Omsk Region	

== Main phase ==
=== 1/16 Finals ===
- 1st leg 23–25 October 2012
- 2nd leg 30–1 November 2012

The 16 winning teams from the 1/16 Finals will compete in the 1/8 Finals playing Home & Away matches. The losers of the 1/16 Final matches will qualify for the 3rd round in Challenge Cup.

Team #1	Results	Team #2
Jedinstvo Brcko (Bosnia and Herzegovina)	0 – 3; 0 – 3	(Russia) Omichka Omsk Region
Igtisadchi Baku (Azerbaijan)	3 – 0; 3 – 0	(Netherlands) Sliedrecht Sport
Rote Raben Vilsbiburg (Germany)	3 – 0; 3 – 0	(Albania) Minatori Rreshen
Azeryol Baku (Azerbaijan)	3 – 0; 1 – 3 Golden Set: 15-9	(Slovenia) Nova KBM Branik Maribor
Kralovo Pole Brno (Czech Republic)	1 – 3; 1 – 3	(Poland) Aluprof Bielsko-Biala
Sk Up Olomouc (Czech Republic)	3 – 0; 1 – 3 Golden Set: 11-15	(Belgium) Dauphines Charleroi
AZS Bialystok (Poland)	3 – 1; 0 – 3	(Austria) SVS Post Schwechat
Lp Salo (Finland)	3 – 2; 0 – 3 Golden Set: 10-15	(France) Beziers VB
Khimik Yuzhny (Ukraine)	1 – 3; 3 – 2 Golden Set: 9-15	(Turkey) Fenerbahçe
TED Ankara Kolejliler (Turkey)	3 – 2; 0 – 3 Golden Set: 10-15	(Belgium) Asterix Kieldrecht
Sagres Neuchatel (Switzerland)	3 – 1; 3 – 2	(Netherlands) Irmato Weert
TENT Obrenovac (Serbia)	3 – 1; 2 – 3 Golden Set: 10-15	(Austria) Askö Linz-Steg
Zok Split 1700 (Croatia)	0 – 3; 0 – 3	(Romania) Stiinta Bacau
Volley Köniz (Switzerland)	3 – 0; 3 – 1	(Croatia) ŽOK Rijeka
A.E.K. Athens (Greece)	3 – 2; 2 – 3	(France) Ses Calais
Kontynium Volyn Lutsk (Ukraine)	3 – 2; 0 – 3 Golden Set: 15-10	(Italy) Rebecchin Meccanica Piacenza

=== 1/8 Finals ===
- 1st leg 13–15 November 2012
- 2nd leg 20–22 November 2012

Team #1	Results	Team #2
Igtisadchi Baku (Azerbaijan)	3 – 1; 1 – 3 Golden Set: 8-15	(Russia) Omichka Omsk Region
Rote Raben Vilsbiburg (Germany)	3 – 1; 2 – 3 Golden Set: 10-15	(Azerbaijan) Azeryol Baku
Dauphines Charleroi (Belgium)	0 – 3; 0 – 3	(Poland) Aluprof Bielsko-Biala
Beziers VB (France)	3 – 1; 3 – 2	(Austria) SVS Post Schwechat
Asterix Kieldrecht (Belgium)	0 – 3; 0 – 3	(Turkey) Fenerbahçe
Askö Linz-Steg (Austria)	3 – 2; 3 – 2	(Switzerland) Sagres Neuchatel
Volley Köniz (Switzerland)	2 – 3; 2 – 3	(Romania) Stiinta Bacau
Kontynium Volyn Lutsk (Ukraine)	3 – 0; 1 – 3 Golden Set: 8-15	(France) Ses Calais

=== 1/4 Finals ===
- 1st leg 4–6 December 2012
- 2nd leg 11–13 December 2012

Team #1	Results	Team #2
Omichka Omsk Region (Russia)	3 – 1; 3 – 1	(Azerbaijan) Azeryol Baku
Aluprof Bielsko-Biala (Poland)	3 – 1; 3 – 0	(France) Beziers VB
Askö Linz-Steg (Austria)	0 – 3; 0 – 3	(Turkey) Fenerbahçe
Ses Calais (France)	3 – 0; 3 – 1	(Romania) Stiinta Bacau

== Challenge Phase ==
- Teams from CEV Women's Champions League: 2004 Tomis Constanța, Bank BPS Fakro Muszyna, Tauron MKS Dabrowa Gornizca, Uralochka-NTMK Ekaterinburg
- Teams from Main phase: Omichka Omsk Region, Aluprof Bielsko-Biala, Fenerbahçe, Ses Calais
- 1st leg 15–16 January 2013
- 2nd leg 22–23 January 2013

Team #1	Results	Team #2
2004 Tomis Constanța (Romania)	1 – 3; 0 – 3	(Russia) Omichka Omsk Region
Bank BPS Fakro Muszyna (Poland)	3 – 1; 3 – 0	(Poland) Aluprof Bielsko-Biala
Fenerbahçe (Turkey)	3 – 0; 3 – 1	(Poland) Tauron MKS Dabrowa Gornizca
Ses Calais (France)	1 – 3; 0 – 3	(Russia) Uralochka-NTMK Ekaterinburg

== Final phase ==
=== Semi-finals ===
- 1st leg 6–7 February 2013
- 2nd leg 12–14 February 2013

Team #1	Results	Team #2
Omichka Omsk Region (Russia)	2 – 3; 0 – 3	(Poland) Bank BPS Fakro Muszyna
Fenerbahçe (Turkey)	3 – 0; 0 – 3 Golden Set: 15-11	(Russia) Uralochka-NTMK Ekaterinburg

=== Finals ===
- 1st leg 27 February 2013
- 2nd leg 2 March 2013

Team #1	Results	Team #2
Bank BPS Fakro Muszyna (Poland)	3 – 2; 3 – 2	(Turkey) Fenerbahçe

2012–13 Women's CEV Cup Champions

Bank BPS Fakro Muszyna
1st title
