= Richa Michelbeke =

Belgian volleyball club

- Ground: Saturnus; Brakel; Belgium
- Chairman: (Belgium) Karel Van Den Berge
- League: Ere Divisie Dames
- 2016–17: 7th
- Website: Club home page

Uniforms
Home	Away

Volley Richa Michelbeke is a Belgian volleyball team from Michelbeke (Brakel).

The club was founded in 1966 and joined the official Belgian leagues one year later. Richa's first chairman was Belgian politician Herman De Croo. Their women's compartiment was only established six years later, in 1973. They achieved promotion to the highest level of Belgian volleyball for the first time in 2004. Their highest league position ever achieved is 4th, in the 2008–09 season. However, their final ranking was 6th, after the season's playoffs.

== 2011-12 squad ==
Coach: (Belgium) Rutwin Willems
Assistant-Coach: (Belgium) Astrid Strobbe
Scout: (Belgium) Emmy De Langhe
Kine: (Belgium) Marjan Himpe
Kine: (Belgium) Heleen Van Damme

#	Nat.	Name
1	(Belgium)	Paulien Neyt
3	(Belgium)	Ellen Verheyden
4	(Belgium)	Evelien Roosens
5	(Latvia)	Nastja Donika
7	(Belgium)	Freja De Middeleer
9	(Belgium)	Deborah Christiaens
10	(Belgium)	Sandrine Cloquet
11	(Belgium)	Ilse Lambrechts
12	(Belgium)	Amber Vanhaecke
13	(Belgium)	Ines Sylverans
15	(Belgium)	Cathy Desmedt

== 2012-13 squad ==
Coach: (Belgium) Nico De Clercq
Assistant-Coach Scout: (Belgium) Tom Claes
Kine: (Belgium) Heleen Van Damme
Kine: (Belgium) Fabiaan De Couvreur

#	Nat.	Name
1	(Belgium)	Paulien Neyt
2	(Belgium)	Tatiana Teterina
3	(Belgium)	Ellen Verheyden
4	(Belgium)	Evelien Roosens
5	(United States)	Heather Young
6	(Belgium)	Charlotte Van Hoorde
7	(Belgium)	Freja De Middeleer
8	(Belgium)	Evi Watté
9	(Belgium)	Deborah Christiaens
11	(United States)	Kendalyn Hartsock
12	(Belgium)	Marine Kraghmann
13	(Belgium)	Kim Albert
15	(Belgium)	Cathy Desmedt
