= Gea Happel Amigos Zoersel =

Belgian volleyball club

Amigos - Van Pelt Sint Antonius Zoersel
- Ground: Amigos - Van Pelt Arena; Sint-Antonius; Belgium
- Chairman: (Belgium) Claude Holvoet
- Captain: (Belgium) Tara Lauwers (women) (Belgium) Robin Blondeel (men)
- Website: Club home page

Uniforms
Home	Away

Amigos - Van Pelt Sint Antonius Zoersel is a Belgian volleyball club based in Zoersel.

The team was founded in 1997, as a result of a merger between VOC Halle (founded 1974) and VC Amigos (founded 1972). Zoersel's women's A squad won promotion to the highest level of Belgian volleyball for the first time in 2006. The men's A squad currently participates in the EuroMillions Volley League since the season 2015-2016.

Amigos Zoersel is the club with most members in Belgium. It counts 8 women's and 9 men's senior teams, and many youth teams.

== Former squad (2018-2019) ==
=== Women 2018-2019 ===
Trainer & coach: (Belgium) Jeroen Rymen
Scouting: (Belgium) Maarten Adriaensen
Assistant-coach: (Belgium) Tania Celis
Strength trainer: (Belgium) Christine Deleuil
Physiotherapist: (Belgium) Gilles Biset
Mental performance coach: (Belgium) Michel Sneyers
Mentor: (Belgium) Rene Rogge

#	Nat.	Name	Position	Height
1	(Netherlands)	Lieke Clerckx	Outside-spiker/ Opposite	1m78
2	(Belgium)	Hélène Mertens	Middle-blocker	1m86
3	(Belgium)	Tara Lauwers (C)	Setter	1m83
4	(Belgium)	Lisette Hoff	Middle-blocker	1m83
6	(Belgium)	Leen Van Grinsven	Libero	1m77
8	(Netherlands)	Laura De Jong	Outside-spiker	1m83
9	(Belgium)	Aline Vervekken	Setter	1m75
11	(Belgium)	Birthe Wittock	Outside-spiker/ Opposite	1m83
13	(Belgium)	Sarah Cools	All round	1m89
14	(Belgium)	Luna Van Peer	Libero	1m68
18	(Belgium)	Valérie El Houssine	Outside-spiker	1m79
-	(Belgium)	Lore Tops	Outside-spiker	-

=== Men 2018-2019 ===
Trainer & coach: (Belgium) Eric Van Drom
Scouting: (Belgium) Elien van der Burgt
Physiotherapist: (Belgium) Gilles Biset
Team Manager: (Belgium) Rudi Brison

#	Nat.	Name	Position	Height
2	(Belgium)	Jan Loosen	Setter	1m90
3	(Belgium)	Wim Deville	Middle-blocker	2m03
4	(Belgium)	Jonas Colson	Outside-spiker	1m93
5	(Belgium)	Dirk Luyten	Opposite	1m93
6	(Belgium)	Jonathan Devriese	Middle-blocker	2m00
7	(Belgium)	Thomas Hofmans	Outside-spiker	1m90
8	(Belgium)	Robin Blondeel (C)	Setter	1m86
9	(Belgium)	Jeroen Oprins	Opposite	2m03
10	(Belgium)	Robin De Bont	Libero	1m83
11	(Belgium)	Mathias Blondeel	Outside-spiker	1m97
12	(Belgium)	Jef Vleugels	Outside-spiker/ Opposite	1m94
13	(Belgium)	Jesper Ribbens	Libero	1m85
14	(Belgium)	Tijs Van Der Maat	Middle-blocker	1m94
