= Hermes Volley Oostende =

Belgian volleyball club

- Ground: Mr. V-Arena; Ostend; Belgium
- Chairman: (Belgium) Philippe Develter
- League: Ere Divisie Dames
- 2016–17: 3rd
- Website: Club home page

Uniforms
Home	Away

Hermes Volley Oostende is a volleyball team based in Ostend (Oostende), Belgium. The club was founded in 1955, but consisted only of one men's team until 1963, when also a women's team was erected.

The women's A squad currently plays at the highest level of Belgian volleyball, Ere Divisie. They have also achieved a spot in the 2011-12 Challenge Cup with their performances of the past season, they were third in the Belgian playoffs. Hermes Oostende also has a B squad in the first national league, the 2nd tier of the Belgian volleyball league pyramid. The C, D and E team play in lower provincial leagues.

At the men's side, Hermes Volley Oostende A plays in the highest Flemish league (the 4th tier of the Belgian volleyball league), aiming for promotion this season. The B squad plays in the second provincial league.

== Honours (Women) ==
=== National competitions ===
- Belgian Championship: 13

1970–71, 1971–72, 1972–73, 1973–74, 1974–75, 1975–76, 1976–77, 1977–78, 1978–79, 1979–80, 1982–83, 1984–85, 1986–87

- Belgian Cup: 5

1970–71, 1971–72, 1976–77, 1981–82, 1982–83

== 2011–12 squads ==
=== Women ===
==== Hermes Volley Oostende A ====
Coach: Dries Wittebolle

#	Nat.	Name
1	(Belgium)	Julie Vermander
2	(Belgium)	Eline David
3	(Belgium)	Sarah Degryse
4	(Belgium)	Anke Allemeersch
5	(Belgium)	Nymphe Verrelst
6	(Belgium)	Renée Verhulst
7	(Belgium)	Karolien Verstrepen
8	(Belgium)	Lies Van Wyngene
9	(Belgium)	Anja Van Damme
10	(Belgium)	Lore Van den Vonder

==== Hermes Volley Oostende B ====
Coach: Bruno Remaut
Scouter: Celine Penson

#	Nat.	Name
1	(Belgium)	Maike Gyselen
3	(Belgium)	Liesbeth Tommelein
4	(Belgium)	Femke Allemeersch
5	(Belgium)	Leen Catrysse
6	(Belgium)	Sophie Huyghelier
7	(Belgium)	Liselot Tavernier
8	(Belgium)	Marjon Willaert
9	(Belgium)	Astrid Tommelein
11	(Belgium)	Margot Baes
13	(Belgium)	Leontien Demeyere
14	(Belgium)	Maxinne Vancrayelynghe
15	(Belgium)	Daryl Roels
16	(Belgium)	Joke Maertens
