= Muszynianka Muszyna =

Polski Cukier Muszynianka
- Full name: Małopolski Klub Siatkówki Muszyna Spółka Akcyjna
- Nickname: Mineralne
- Founded: 1982
- Ground: Hala sportowa Muszyna, Muszyna, Poland (Capacity: 1,000)
- Chairman: Grzegorz Jeżowski
- Head coach: Ryszard Litwin
- League: Orlen Liga
- 2016–17: 10th
- Website: Club home page

Uniforms
Home	Away

MKS Muszynianka is a Polish women's volleyball club based in Muszyna and playing in the Orlen Liga.

== Previous names ==
Due to sponsorship, the club have competed under the following names:

- Poprad Muszyna (1982–1985)
- Międzyszkolny Klub Sportowy (MKS) Kurier Muszyna (1985–2000)
- MKS Muszynianka Muszyna (2000–2005)
- MKS Muszynianka-Fakro Muszyna (2005–2009)
- Bank BPS Muszynianka Fakro Muszyna (2009–2013)
- Polski Cukier Muszynianka Fakro Bank BPS (2013–2014)
- Polski Cukier Muszynianka (2014–present)

== History ==
The club was founded in 1982 as the volleyball department of Ludowego Zespołu Sportowego Poprad and started competing in the lower divisions of Poland. After few seasons, financial problems forced the club to withdraw from the competition. Bogdan Serwiński and Grzegorz Jeżowski then submitted a youth team and to the lower Polish divisions under the name of Międzyszkolny Klub Sportowy (MKS) Kurier Muszyna. By achieving promotions the team begun to climb the national leagues, in 2000 it was renamed Muszynianka and in 2003 it gained promotion to the highest league (called Liga Serie A).

In 2005–06, its third season in the top level, the club won the championship. Another three titles were added (two championships and one super cup) before a remarkable season with the club winning the double (league and cup) in 2010–11 and a few months later it won the super cup of 2011. International success also came when the club claimed the 2012–13 CEV Cup.

== Honours ==
=== National competitions ===
- Polish Championship: 4

2005–06, 2007–08, 2008–09, 2010–11

- Polish Cup: 1

2010–11

- Polish Super Cup: 2

2009, 2011

=== International competitions ===
- CEV Cup: 1

2012–13

== Team ==
Season 2016–2017, as of February 2017.

Number	Player	Position	Height (m)	Weight (kg)	Birth date
2	(Poland) Magdalena Szabó	Outside hitter	1.80	66	14 September 1989 (age 35)
5	(Serbia) Maja Savić	Middle blocker	1.89	73	14 August 1993 (age 31)
6	(Poland) Anna Grejman	Outside hitter	1.83	70	8 June 1993 (age 31)
7	(Poland) Magdalena Wawrzyniak	Opposite	1.85	73	14 March 1990 (age 35)
9	(Poland) Agnieszka Rabka	Setter	1.78	65	30 August 1978 (age 46)
10	(Serbia) Nataša Čikiriz	Outside hitter	1.93	70	26 June 1995 (age 29)
11	(Poland) Małgorzata Lis	Middle blocker	1.85	74	14 April 1981 (age 43)
12	(Poland) Justyna Sosnowska	Middle blicker	1.88	78	14 June 1992 (age 32)
13	(Poland) Aleksandra Wójcik	Outside hitter	1.85	74	3 January 1994 (age 31)
14	(Poland) Koleta Łyszkiewicz	Opposite	1.93	79	22 January 1993 (age 32)
15	(Poland) Dorota Medyńska	Libero	1.70	61	25 April 1993 (age 31)
16	(Poland) Dorota Wilk	Setter	1.78	68	28 April 1988 (age 36)
17	(Slovenia) Marina Cvetanović	Outside hitter	1.88	75	14 February 1986 (age 39)
18	(Serbia) Tanja Sredić	Middle blocker	1.86	68	11 October 1991 (age 33)
