= Stod IL =

Norwegian sports club

Logo.

Stod Idrettslag is a Norwegian sports club from Stod in Steinkjer Municipality in Trøndelag county. It has sections for volleyball, association football and Nordic skiing.

It was founded in 1902.

The women's volleyball team plays in the highest Norwegian league. Its home arena is Stodhallen. It has a cooperation with Steinkjer Upper Secondary School.

The club currently does not field any senior team in football, only one seven-a-side team for men.
