= Belgium Women's Volleyball League (Liga A) =

Belgian professional sports league

- Sport: Volleyball
- Founded: 1950
- No. of teams: 9
- Country: Belgium
- Continent: Europe
- Most recent champion: Asterix Avo (13th title)
- Most titles: Hermes Volley Oostende; Asterix Avo (13 titles)

The Division of Honour (since 2013 known as Liga A) is the highest level of women's volleyball in Belgium.

== Teams ==
The following clubs are competing in the 2020–21 season:

,
2017-18 Liga A teams location.

Team	Location	Venue	Capacity
Asterix Avo	Beveren	Sporthal De Meerminnen	
Tchalou Volley	Thuin	Shape 'n go Arena	
Interfreight Antwerp Volley Team	Antwerp	Sporthal Arena in Deurne	
VDK Gent Dames A	Ghent	EDUGO Arena	1,000
Hermes Rekkenshop Oostende A	Oostende	Mr. V-Arena	
Jaraco Ladies Volley Limburg As-Tongeren	Genk	SportinGenk Park - Arcade Hall	
VC Oudegem A	Dendermonde	Sporthal Oudegem	
Volley Saturnus Michelbeke	Brakel	Sporthal Averbo	
Modal Charleroi	Charleroi	Centre Sportif Féminin Fernand Ballens	

Jaraco Ladies Volley Limburg As/Tongeren is the merger of former Liga A teams Datovoc Tongeren and Jaraco As.

== Previous winners ==
- 1950–51: Femina (1)
- 1951–52: Brabo Antwerpen (1)
- 1952–53: Brabo Antwerpen (2)
- 1953–54: Brabo Antwerpen (3)
- 1954–55: Spartacus (1)
- 1955–56: Brabo Antwerpen (4)
- 1956–57: Brabo Antwerpen (5)
- 1957–58: Brabo Antwerpen (6)
- 1958–59: Brabo Antwerpen (7)
- 1959–60: Brabo Antwerpen (8)
- 1960–61: Brabo Antwerpen (9)
- 1961–62: Brabo Antwerpen (10)
- 1962–63: CAPCI Ixelles (1)
- 1963–64: VOG Oostende (1)
- 1964–65: CAPCI Ixelles (2)
- 1965–66: VOG Oostende (2)
- 1966–67: VOG Oostende (3)
- 1967–68: VOG Oostende (4)
- 1968–69: VOG Oostende (5)
- 1969–70: VOG Oostende (6)
- 1970–71: Hermes Volley Oostende (1)
- 1971–72: Hermes Volley Oostende (2)
- 1972–73: Hermes Volley Oostende (3)
- 1973–74: Hermes Volley Oostende (4)
- 1974–75: Hermes Volley Oostende (5)
- 1975–76: Hermes Volley Oostende (6)
- 1976–77: Hermes Volley Oostende (7)
- 1977–78: Hermes Volley Oostende (8)
- 1978–79: Hermes Volley Oostende (9)
- 1979–80: Hermes Volley Oostende (10)
- 1980–81: Dilbeek-Itterbeek SC (1)
- 1981–82: VC Temse (1)
- 1982–83: Hermes Volley Oostende (11)
- 1983–84: Dilbeek-Itterbeek SC (2)
- 1984–85: Hermes Volley Oostende (12)
- 1985–86: DECO Denderhoutem (1)
- 1986–87: Hermes Volley Oostende (13)
- 1987–88: Antonius Herentals (1)
- 1988–89: VC Temse (2)
- 1989–90: Antonius Herentals (2)
- 1990–91: Antonius Herentals (3)
- 1991–92: Antonius Herentals (4)
- 1992–93: Antonius Herentals (5)
- 1993–94: Datovoc Tongeren (1)
- 1994–95: Datovoc Tongeren (2)
- 1995–96: Antonius Herentals (6)
- 1996–97: Antonius Herentals (7)
- 1997–98: Asterix Kieldrecht (1)
- 1998–99: Antonius Herentals (8)
- 1999–00: Asterix Kieldrecht (2)
- 2000–01: Asterix Kieldrecht (3)
- 2001–02: Datovoc Tongeren (3)
- 2002–03: Datovoc Tongeren (4)
- 2003–04: Datovoc Tongeren (5)
- 2004–05: Datovoc Tongeren (6)
- 2005–06: Dauphines Charleroi (1)
- 2006–07: Datovoc Tongeren (7)
- 2007–08: Asterix Kieldrecht (4)
- 2008–09: Dauphines Charleroi (2)
- 2009–10: Asterix Kieldrecht (5)
- 2010–11: Asterix Kieldrecht (6)
- 2011–12: Asterix Kieldrecht (7)
- 2012–13: VDK Gent Dames (1)
- 2013–14: Asterix Kieldrecht (8)
- 2014–15: Asterix Kieldrecht (9)
- 2015–16: Asterix Kieldrecht (10)
- 2016–17: Asterix Avo Beveren (11)
- 2017–18: Asterix Avo Beveren (12)
- 2018–19: Asterix Avo (13)
- 2019–20: none due to corona crisis
- 2020–21: Asterix Avo Beveren (14)
- 2021–22: Gent W (2)
- 2022–23: Asterix Avo Beveren (15)

== Titles by club ==
Club	Titles	Champions Years
Asterix Kieldrecht	15	1997–98, 1999–00, 2000–01, 2007–08, 2009–10, 2010–11, 2011–12, 2013–14, 2014–15, 2015–16, 2016–17, 2017–18, 2018–19, 2020-21, 2022-23
Hermes Volley Oostende	13	1970–71, 1971–72, 1972–73, 1973–74, 1974–75, 1975–76, 1976–77, 1977–78, 1978–79, 1979–80, 1982–83, 1984–85, 1986–87
Brabo Antwerpen	10	1951–52, 1952–53, 1953–54, 1955–56, 1956–57, 1957–58, 1958–59, 1959–60, 1960–61, 1961–62
Antonius Herentals	8	1987–88, 1989–90, 1990–91, 1991–92, 1992–93, 1995–96, 1996–97, 1998–99
Datovoc Tongeren	7	1993–94, 1994–95, 2001–02, 2002–03, 2003–04, 2004–05, 2006–07
VOG Oostende	6	1963–64, 1965–66, 1966–67, 1967–68, 1968–69, 1969–70
CAPCI Ixelles	2	1962–63, 1964–65
Dauphines Charleroi	2	2005–06, 2008–09
Dilbeek-Itterbeek SC	2	1980–81, 1983–84
VC Temse	2	1981–82, 1988–89
DECO Denderhoutem	1	1985–86
Femina	1	1950–51
Spartacus	1	1954–55
VDK Gent Dames	1	2012–13

== See also ==
- Belgium Men's Volleyball League
