= Datovoc Tongeren =

Belgian volleyball club

Datovoc
- Ground: Pibo; Tongeren; Belgium
- Chairman: (Belgium) Guy Dessers
- League: Ere Divisie Dames
- 2016–17: 9th
- Website: Club home page

Uniforms
Home	Away

Damesvolleybalclub Tongeren is a Belgian women's volleyball team based in Tongeren.

The club was founded in 1967, under the name Tovoc. After a merger with Hasselt, the club's name changed to Hatovoc. This team promoted for the first time to Ere Divisie Dames in 1985. The merger with Hasselt ended in 1990, and the name was again changed: Datovoc. Datovoc Tongeren has been present at the highest level of the Belgian volleyball league pyramid since 1985, no other team does better.

After several national titles and cup wins, and to avoid financial trouble, Datovoc has changed their strategy and now mainly focusses on young, talented Belgian players. This strategy is followed by most of the teams present in Ere Divisie.

== Honours ==
=== National competitions ===
- Belgian Championship: 7

1993–94, 1994–95, 2001–02, 2002–03, 2003–04, 2004–05, 2006–07

- Belgian Cup: 6

1991–92, 1993–94, 1999–00, 2002–03, 2003–04, 2004–05

- Belgian Supercup: 1

2008

=== International competitions ===
- Top Teams Cup:

Third (2): 2003–04, 2004–05
Fourth (2): 2001–02, 2005–06

== Current squad ==
Coach: (Belgium) Hans Bungeneers

#	Nat.	Name
3	(Belgium)	Anne Moors
4	(Belgium)	Sophie Vanimmen
5	(Belgium)	Aukje Janssen
7	(Belgium)	Tara Lauwers
8	(Belgium)	Joke Rommens
9	(Belgium)	Natalie Wouters
10	(Belgium)	Lotte Penders
11	(Belgium)	Evelien Martens
12	(Belgium)	Tara Daerden
