= Charleroi Volley =

Belgian volleyball club

- Ground: Salle Ballens; Monceau-sur-Sambre; Belgium
- League: Ere Divisie Dames
- Website: charleroivolley.be

Uniforms
Home	Away

Charleroi Volley, previously Dauphines Charleroi (until 2017), is a Belgian women's volleyball club from Charleroi.

The women's A squad currently plays at the highest level of Belgian volleyball, Ere Divisie. They achieved promotion to the highest level of Belgian volleyball in 1988.

Charleroi Volley also has a B squad in Nationale 3, the 4th tier of the Belgian volleyball league pyramid. The C and D team play in lower provincial leagues.

In 2016 Dauphines Charleroi was merged with Carolo Smashing Club. The merged club was first named Sharks Charleroi, but the name was later changed to Charleroi Volley.

== Previous names ==
The club have competed under the following names:

- Dauphines Charleroi (–2017)
- Sharks Charleroi (2017–2017)
- Charleroi Volley (2017–2018)
- Modal Charleroi Volley (2018–2021)
- Charleroi Volley (2021–2022)
- E.S. Charleroi Volley (2022–)

== Honours ==
=== National competitions ===
- Belgian Championship: 2

2005–06, 2008–09

- Belgian Cup: 2

1994–95, 2011–12

== Team squad ==
Season 2016–2017, as of January 2017.

Number	Player	Position	Height (m)	Weight (kg)	Birth date
1	(Spain) Diana Castaño Sarrias	Libero	1.71	61	5 April 1983 (age 43)
2	(Bulgaria) Milena Dimova	Middle blocker	1.90	62	5 July 1994 (age 31)
3	(Greece) Styliani-Marina Tsiakoula	Middle blocker	1.85	70	13 March 1998 (age 28)
4	(Belgium) Marine Hannaert	Libero	1.76	56	29 July 1996 (age 29)
5	(Belgium) Bente Daniels	Middle blocker	1.85	77	8 August 1996 (age 29)
6	(Belgium) Pauline Martin	Opposite	1.85	69	9 April 2002 (age 24)
9	(Croatia) Lucija Mlinar	Outside hitter	1.80	69	6 May 1995 (age 31)
10	(Croatia) Marcella Šaini	Setter	1.81	70	3 October 1992 (age 33)
13	(Denmark) Anelia Mintcheva	Setter	1.78	61	7 December 1984 (age 41)
14	(Spain) Sara Folgueira	Opposite	1.88	79	17 December 1996 (age 29)
15	(Argentina) Marcia Monica Scacchi	Outside hitter	1.83	77	29 January 1982 (age 44)
17	(Poland) Ewa Piątkowska	Middle blocker	1.88	75	24 June 1980 (age 45)
Coach: (Serbia) Velibor Ivanović

2011–2012 Team
#	Nationality	Name
1	Belgium	Céline Laforge
3	Belgium	Ophélie Gillain
4	Belgium	Charline Cambier
5	Romania	Ioana Pristavu
7	Bulgaria	Olga Krasteva
8	Serbia	Sonja Stanic
10	Bulgaria	Mariya Dimitrova
11	Belgium	Caroline Laforge
12	Belgium	Louise Staquet
16	Belgium	Hanne De Haes
—	Senegal	Bineta Ndiaye
Coach: Pascual Saurín
