= Asterix Kieldrecht =

Belgian volleyball club

Asterix Avo
- Founded: 1969
- Ground: Sporthal De Meerminnen; Beveren; Belgium
- Chairman: (Belgium) Jan Bens
- League: Ere Divisie Dames
- 2016–17: 1st
- Website: Club home page

Uniforms
Home	Away

Asterix Avo is a Belgian women's volleyball club based in Kieldrecht (Beveren).

The team was founded in 1969 as Damesvolleybalclub Asterix Kieldrecht. By the end of the 1980s, the team climbed to the highest level of women's volleyball in Belgium. The club won its first trophy in 1996, when Datovoc Tongeren was defeated in the Belgian cup final.

A highlight in the history of Asterix Kieldrecht was the 2001 CEV Top Teams Cup victory against the Austrian club Telekom Post Wien.

== Previous names ==
The club have competed under the following names:

- Asterix Kieldrecht (1969–2016)
- Asterix Avo (2016–present)

== Honours ==
=== National competitions ===
- Belgian Championship: 11

1997–98, 1999–00, 2000–01, 2007–08, 2009–10, 2010–11, 2011–12, 2013–14, 2014–15, 2015–16, 2016–17

- Belgian Cup: 14

1995–96, 1997–98, 1998–99, 2000–01, 2001–02, 2005–06, 2006–07, 2007–08, 2009–10, 2010–11, 2013–14, 2014–15, 2015–16, 2016–17

- Belgian Supercup: 9

1999–00, 2001–02, 2004–05, 2005–06, 2007–08, 2009–10, 2011–12, 2013–14, 2015–16

=== International competitions ===
- Top Teams Cup: 1

2000–01

== Team squad ==
Season 2016–2017, as of January 2017.

Number	Player	Position	Height (m)	Weight (kg)	Birth date
1	(Belgium) Amber De Tant	Libero	1.77	66	22 March 1998 (age 28)
2	(Belgium) Jasmien Biebauw	Setter	1.80	79	24 September 1990 (age 35)
3	(Belgium) Britt Herbots	Outside hitter	1.82	63	24 September 1999 (age 26)
4	(Belgium) Nathalie Lemmens	Middle blocker	1.92	82	12 March 1995 (age 31)
6	(Belgium) Silke Van Avermaet	Middle blocker	1.92	76	2 June 1999 (age 26)
7	(Belgium) Charlotte Coppin	Setter	1.86	67	1 December 1998 (age 27)
8	(Belgium) Britt Ruysschaert	Libero	1.76	60	27 May 1994 (age 31)
9	(Belgium) Manon Stragier	Outside hitter	1.84	69	12 March 1999 (age 27)
10	(Belgium) Justine D'Hondt	Outside hitter	1.75	60	8 July 1999 (age 26)
11	(Belgium) Hanne Coppens	Middle blocker	1.85	70	7 May 1998 (age 27)
13	(Belgium) Sarah Smits	Outside hitter	1.70	70	22 March 1988 (age 38)
14	(Belgium) Celine Van Gestel	Outside hitter	1.82	72	7 November 1997 (age 28)
Coach: (Belgium) Gert Vande Broek

2015–2016 Team
#	Nationality	Name
1	Belgium	Amber De Tant
2	Belgium	Jasmien Biebauw
3	Belgium	Britt Herbots
4	Belgium	Nathalie Lemmens
5	Belgium	Fien Callens
6	Belgium	Silke Van Avermaet
7	Belgium	Dominika Strumilo
8	Belgium	Britt Ruysschaert
9	Belgium	Manon Stragier
10	Belgium	Sarah Cools
12	Belgium	Lisa Van Den Vonder
13	Belgium	Sarah Smits
14	Belgium	Celine Van Gestel
Coach: (Belgium) Gert Vande Broek
