= Agata Mróz-Olszewska =

Polish volleyball player (1982–2008)

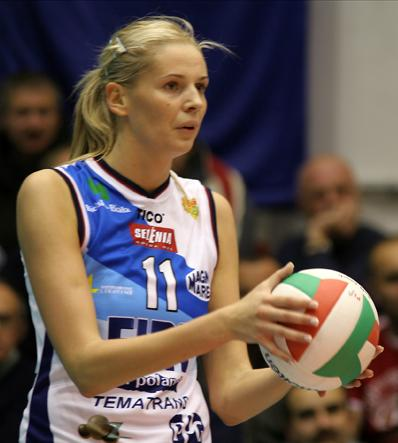

Personal information
- Full name: Agata Mróz-Olszewska (née Mróz)
- Nationality: Polish
- Born: 7 April 1982; Dąbrowa Tarnowska, Poland
- Died: 4 June 2008 (aged 26); Wrocław, Poland
- Hometown: Tarnów, Poland
- Height: 1.91 m (6 ft 3 in)
- Weight: 73 kg (161 lb)
- Spike: 315 cm (124 in)
- Block: 304 cm (120 in)

Volleyball information
- Position: Middle-blocker
- Number: 11

Career
Years	Teams
1995–1997; 1997–2000; 2002–2003; 2003–2006; 2006–2007	(Poland) Tarnovia Tarnów (Poland) SMS PZPS Sosnowiec (Poland) AZS Ostrowiec Św. (Poland) BKS Bielsko-Biała (Spain) CAV Murcia 2005

National team
1997–2007	Poland
Honours
Representing Poland
European Championship
Gold medal – first place	2003 Turkey
Gold medal – first place	2005 Croatia
- Last updated: 27 May 2014

Agata Danuta Mróz-Olszewska (7 April 1982 – 4 June 2008) was a Polish volleyball player, a member of the Poland women's national volleyball team in 1997–2007, double European Champion (Turkey 2003, Croatia 2005). She died of an infection following a bone marrow transplant to treat Myelodysplastic syndrome, which she had suffered from since the age of 17.

== Personal life ==
Agata was born in Dąbrowa Tarnowska, but raised in Tarnów. Her sister Katarzyna is a volleyball player and her brother Paweł a basketball player. On 9 June 2007, she married Jacek Olszewski. Since the age of 17, she suffered myelodysplastic syndrome. In 2007, she gave up her volleyball career because of her bone marrow disease, and began treatment. On 12 January 2008, she announced she was pregnant, and that as a result she could not change treatment. Their daughter Liliana was born prematurely on 4 April 2008.

On 22 May 2008, she had a bone marrow transplant in the Department of Bone Marrow Transplantation, Oncology and Hematology of the Medical University in Wrocław. She died fourteen days later from sepsis and septic shock. Her funeral was held on her first wedding anniversary, 9 June 2008.

== Career ==
=== Clubs ===
Olszewska-Mróz began her career in Tarnovia Tarnów, then moved to SMS Sosnowiec, WSBiP Ostrowiec Świętokrzyski and BKS Stal Bielsko-Biała, where she was twice champion of Poland (2003 and 2004). She also played for the Spanish team Grupo 2002 Murcia, winning both the Championship of Spain and the Cup of Spain tournament (2007).

=== National team ===
She was one of the main competitors in the team led by coach Andrzej Niemczyk. She won two gold medals with the Polish national team at the European Championships: Turkey 2003 and Croatia 2005. On 22 November 2005, received a state award granted by the Polish President - Gold Cross of Merit for her contribution to the development of sport.

== Sporting achievements ==
=== National team ===
- 1999 CEV U19 European Championship
- 2003 CEV European Championship
- 2005 CEV European Championship

=== State awards ===
- 2005 Gold Cross of Merit
- 2009 Knight's Cross of Polonia Restituta (posthumously)

== Memorial ==
Despite the latter posthumous award (badge), her husband did not accept it. He stated that the doctors who helped Agata should receive the distinction. On 11 May 2012, was the premiere of a film Nad życie about Agata Mroz-Olszewska, her private life, illness, marriage and the birth of her daughter. During the wedding scene among the guests appeared husband Jacek and daughter Liliana.
