= Berenika Tomsia =

Polish volleyball player (born 1988)

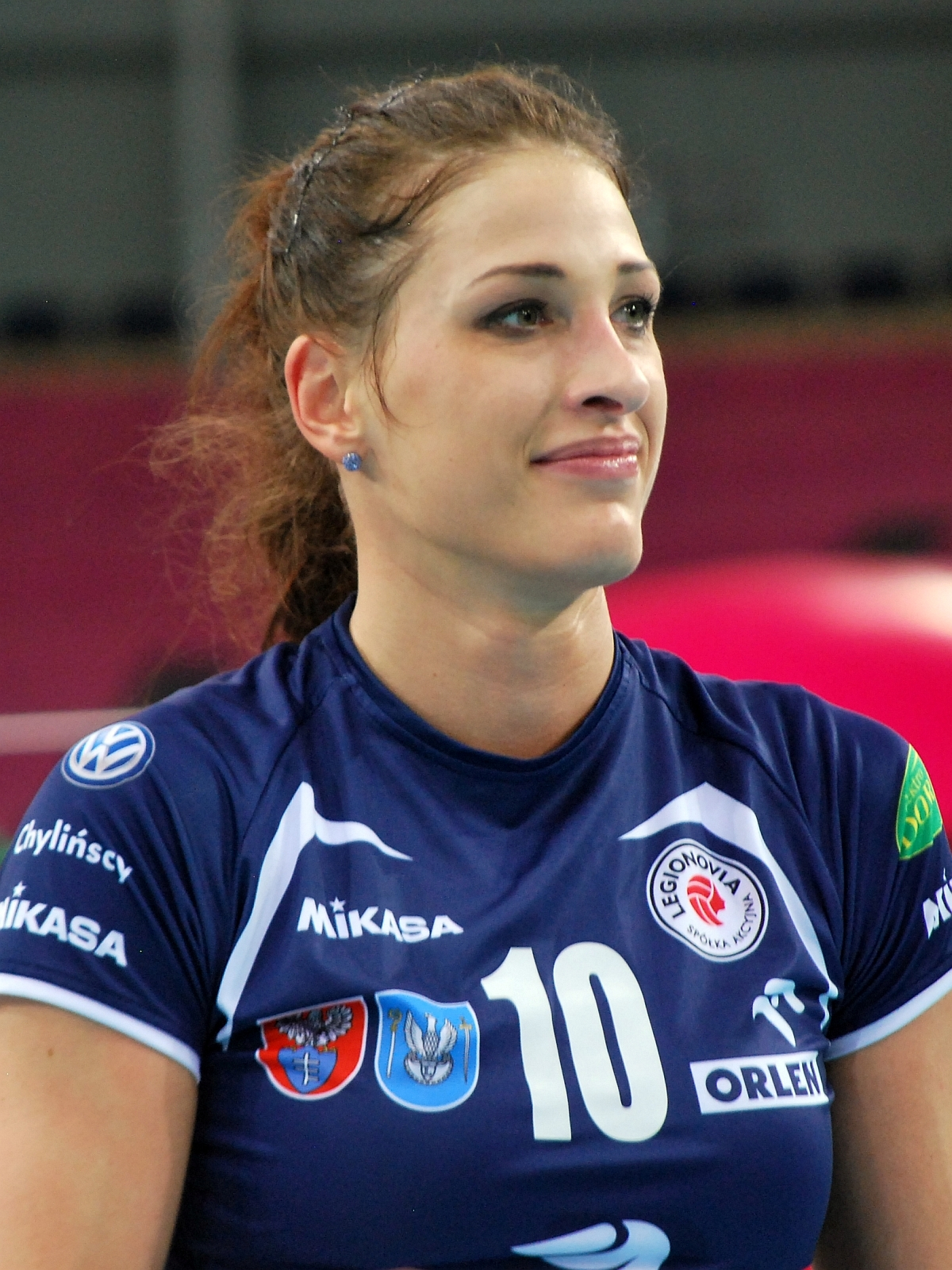

Personal information
- Born: 18 March 1988 (age 38); Gdańsk, Poland
- Height: 1.90 m (6 ft 3 in)
- Weight: 67 kg (148 lb)
- Spike: 325 cm (128 in)
- Block: 310 cm (122 in)

Volleyball information
- Position: Spiker
- Current team: NEC Red Rockets
- Number: 6

National team
2003-	Poland
Honours
Women's volleyball
Representing Poland
Universiade
Gold medal – first place	2007 Bangkok
Bronze medal – third place	2009 Belgrad
- Last updated: December 2017

Berenika Tomsia (born 18 March 1988) is a Polish volleyball player. She is a gold medalist of Summer Universiade Bangkok 2007 and bronze medalist of Summer Universiade Belgrad 2009.

== Career ==
=== Clubs ===
Berenika Tomsia played for Fenerbahçe in the 2012 FIVB Club World Championship held in Doha, Qatar and helped her team to win the bronze medal after defeating Puerto Rico's Lancheras de Cataño 3-0. She was selected to play the Italian League All-Star game in 2017.

Club	Country	From	To
Energa Gedania Gdańsk	Poland	1999	2008
BKS Stal Bielsko-Biała	Poland	2008	2011
Scavolini Pesaro	Italy	2011	2012
Fenerbahçe Istanbul	Turkey	2012	2013
LTS Legionovia Legionowo	Poland	2013	2014
Metalleghe Sanitars Montichiari	Italy	2014	2016
Imoco Volley Conegliano	Italy	2016	jan 2017
Saugella Team Monza	Italy	jan 2017	2017
Incheon Heungkuk Life Insurance Pink Spiders	South Korea	2018	2019
NEC Red Rockets	Japan		

== Sporting achievements ==
=== Clubs ===
==== CEV Cup ====
- 2012/2013 - with Fenerbahçe

==== FIVB Club World Championship ====
- Qatar 2012 - with Fenerbahçe

KOVO V-League

- Season 2018-19 with Incheon Heungkuk Life Insurance Pink Spiders

==== National championships ====
- 2008/2009 Polish Cup, with BKS Stal Bielsko-Biała
- 2008/2009 Polish Championship, with BKS Stal Bielsko-Biała
- 2009/2010 Polish Championship, with BKS Stal Bielsko-Biała
- 2010/2011 Polish SuperCup, with BKS Stal Bielsko-Biała
- 2010/2011 Polish Championship, with BKS Stal Bielsko-Biała

=== National team ===
==== Universiade ====
- 2007 Bangkok
- 2009 Belgrad

==== Individually ====
- 2011 Polish Cup - Best Blocker
- 2013 CEV Cup - Best Blocker
