= Izabela Lemańczyk =

Polish volleyball player (born 1990)

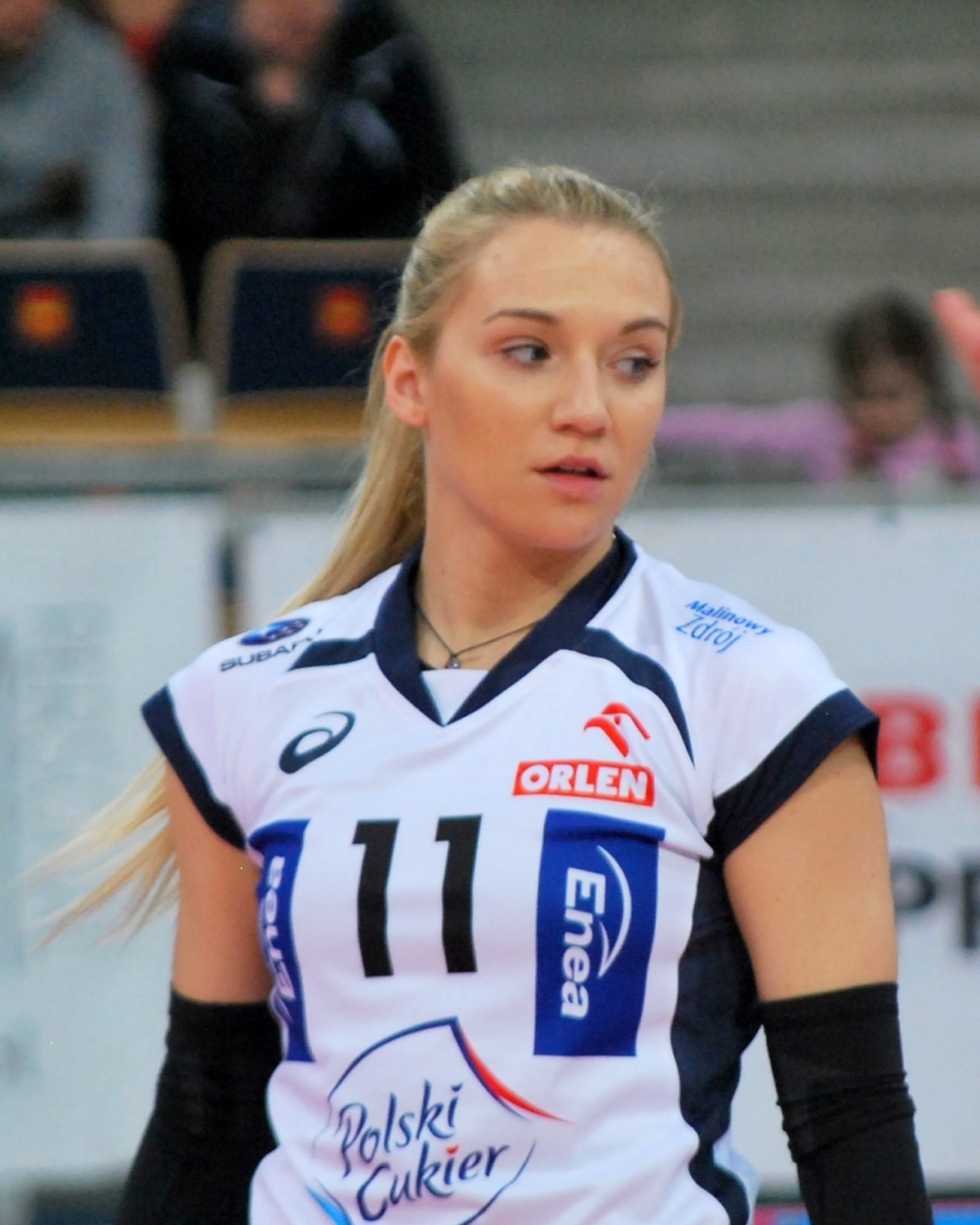

Personal information
- Full name: Izabela Lemańczyk (née Śliwa)
- Nickname: Pestka
- Nationality: Poland
- Born: 11 December 1990 (age 35); Kraków, Poland
- Height: 1.69 m (5 ft 7 in)
- Weight: 61 kg (134 lb)
- Spike: 290 cm (110 in)
- Block: 270 cm (110 in)

Volleyball information
- Position: Libero
- Current club: MKS Dąbrowa Górnicza
- Number: 11

Career
Years	Teams
2006–2009	Wisła Kraków
2009–2011	Atom Trefl Sopot
2011–2012	KS Murowana Goślina
2012–2013	KPS Chemik Police
2013–2014	VT Aurubis Hamburg
2014–2015	VC Wiesbaden
2015–2016	Muszynianka Muszyna
2016–	MKS Dąbrowa Górnicza
- Last updated: 12 December 2016

Izabela Lemańczyk (née Śliwa) (born 11 December 1990) is a Polish volleyball player who plays for MKS Dąbrowa Górnicza. She played for the under-18 and under-20 teams of Poland women's national volleyball team.

== Personal life ==
Her mother is Magdalena Śliwa, a double European Champion (2003, 2005), who played 359 matches for Poland women's national volleyball team. Izabela and her mother played together in the same team - Atom Trefl Sopot during the 2010–11 season.

== Clubs ==
- (Poland) Wisła Kraków (2006–2009)
- (Poland) Atom Trefl Sopot (2009–2011)
- (Poland) KS Murowana Goślina (2011–2012)
- (Poland) KPS Chemik Police (2012–2013)
- (Germany) VT Aurubis Hamburg (2013–2014)
- (Germany) VC Wiesbaden (2014–2015)
- (Poland) Muszynianka Muszyna (2015–2016)
- (Poland) MKS Dąbrowa Górnicza (2016–present)

== Sporting achievements ==
=== Clubs ===
==== National championships ====
- 2010/2011 Polish Championship, with Atom Trefl Sopot
