= Eleonora Dziękiewicz =

Polish volleyball player (born 1978)

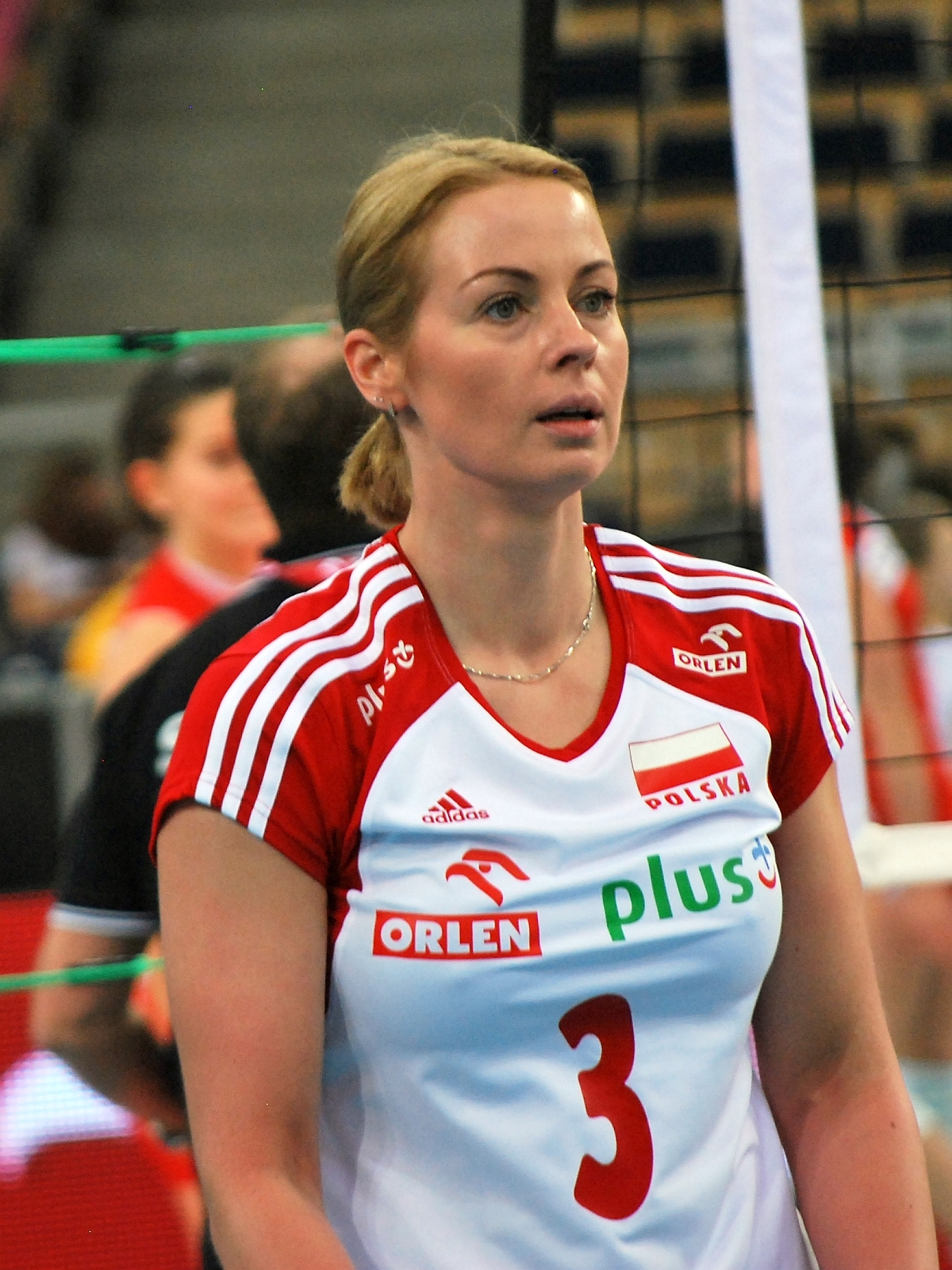

Personal information
- Full name: Eleonora Dziękiewicz (née Staniszewska)
- Nickname: Lena
- Nationality: Poland
- Born: 25 October 1978 (age 48); Gdańsk, Poland
- Height: 1.85 m (6 ft 1 in)
- Weight: 78 kg (172 lb)
- Spike: 308 cm (121 in)
- Block: 295 cm (116 in)

Volleyball information
- Position: Middle-blocker
- Current club: MKS Dąbrowa Górnicza
- Number: 6 (club), 3 (national team)

Career
Years	Teams
	Gedania Gdańsk
	Sokół Mogilno
	Gedania Gdańsk
2000–2003	KPSK Stal Mielec
2003–2006	Nafta-Gaz Piła
2006–2008	Winiary Kalisz
2008–2010	BKS Stal Bielsko-Biała
2010–2012	Atom Trefl Sopot
2012–2013	Muszynianka Muszyna
2013–	MKS Dąbrowa Górnicza

National team
2007–2014	Poland (69)
Honours
Representing Poland
Women's Volleyball
European Championship
Bronze medal – third place	2009 Poland
- Last updated: 11 December 2016

Eleonora Dziękiewicz (née Staniszewska) (born 25 October 1978) is a Polish volleyball player, a member of Poland women's national volleyball team and Polish club Tauron MKS Dąbrowa Górnicza, bronze medalist of European Championship 2009, three-time Polish Champion (2007, 2010, 2012).

== Career ==
=== Clubs ===
- (Poland) Gedania Gdańsk
- (Poland) Sokół Mogilno
- (Poland) Gedania Gdańsk
- (Poland) KPSK Stal Mielec (2000–2003)
- (Poland) Nafta-Gaz Piła (2003–2006)
- (Poland) Winiary Kalisz (2006–2008)
- (Poland) BKS Stal Bielsko-Biała (2008–2010)
- (Poland) Atom Trefl Sopot (2010–2012)
- (Poland) Muszynianka Muszyna (2012–2013)
- (Poland) MKS Dąbrowa Górnicza (2013–present)

=== National team ===
In October 2009 she won with teammates bronze medal of European Championship 2009 after winning match against Germany.

== Sporting achievements ==
=== Clubs ===
==== CEV Cup ====
- 2008/2009 – with BKS Stal Bielsko-Biała

==== National championships ====
- 2004/2005 Polish Championship, with Nafta-Gaz Piła
- 2005/2006 Polish Championship, with Nafta-Gaz Piła
- 2006/2007 Polish Cup, with Winiary Kalisz
- 2006/2007 Polish Championship, with Winiary Kalisz
- 2007/2008 Polish Championship, with Winiary Kalisz
- 2008/2009 Polish Cup, with BKS Stal Bielsko-Biała
- 2008/2009 Polish Championship, with BKS Stal Bielsko-Biała
- 2009/2010 Polish Championship, with BKS Stal Bielsko-Biała
- 2010/2011 Polish Championship, with Atom Trefl Sopot
- 2011/2012 Polish Championship, with Atom Trefl Sopot
- 2012/2013 Polish Championship, with Muszynianka Muszyna
- 2012/2013 Polish SuperCup, with Muszynianka Muszyna

=== National team ===
==== CEV European Championships ====
- 2009 Poland

=== Individually ===
- 2007 Polish Cup – Most Valuable Player
- 2007 FIVB World Grand Prix – Best Blocker

Awards
Preceded by (Italy) Sara Anzanello	Best Blocker of FIVB World Grand Prix; 2007	Succeeded by (Brazil) Walewska Oliveira
