= Helena Horká =

Czech volleyball player (born 1981)

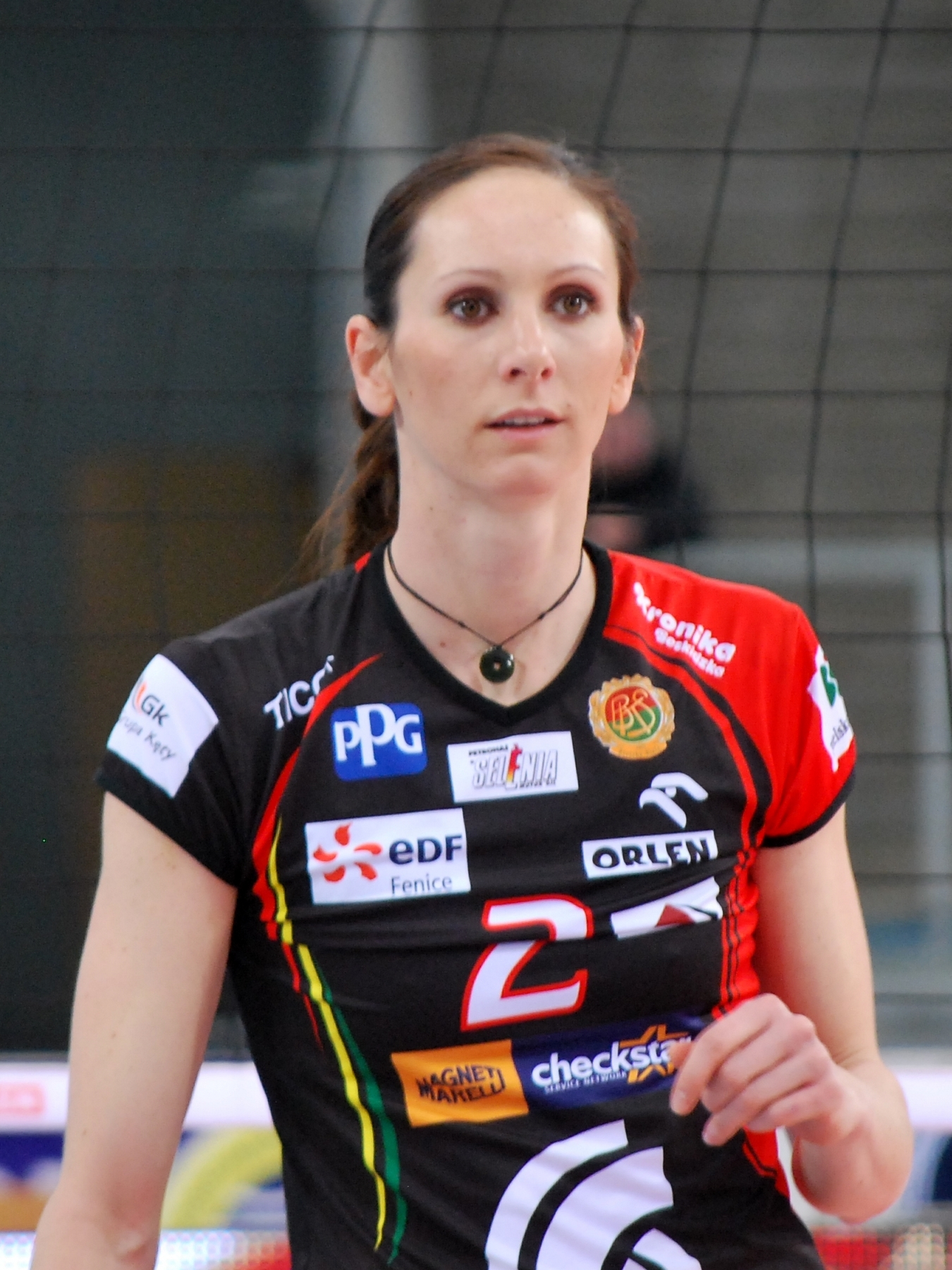

Personal information
- Nationality: Czech Republic
- Born: 15 June 1981 (age 45); Brno, Czechoslovakia
- Height: 1.88 m (6 ft 2 in)

Volleyball information
- Position: Outside-spiker
- Current club: MKS Dąbrowa Górnicza
- Number: 2

Career
Years	Teams
1999–2003	VK Královo Pole Brno
2003–2004	Volley Köniz
2004–2005	O.F.A. Apollonios
2005–2007	Panellinios V.C.
2007–2008	Winiary Kalisz
2008–2010	BKS Stal Bielsko-Biała
2011–2012	VK Prostějov
2012–2016	BKS Stal Bielsko-Biała
2016–	MKS Dąbrowa Górnicza

National team
2001–2012	Czech Republic
- Last updated: 11 December 2016

Helena Horká (born 15 June 1981) is a Czech female volleyball player, who plays as an outside-spiker for MKS Dąbrowa Górnicza.

She was part of the Czech Republic women's national volleyball team at the 2002 FIVB Volleyball Women's World Championship in Germany. She also competed at the 2001 Women's European Volleyball Championship and 2007 Women's European Volleyball Championship.

== Clubs ==
- (Czech Republic) VK Královo Pole Brno (1999–2003)
- (Switzerland) Volley Köniz (2003–2004)
- (Greece) O.F.A. Apollonios (2004–2005)
- (Greece) Panellinios V.C. (2005–2007)
- (Poland) Winiary Kalisz (2007–2008)
- (Poland) BKS Stal Bielsko-Biała (2008–2010)
- (Czech Republic) VK Prostějov (2011–2012)
- (Poland) BKS Stal Bielsko-Biała (2012–2016)
- (Poland) MKS Dąbrowa Górnicza (2016–present)

== See also ==
- pl:Helena Horká
- fr:Helena Horká
