= MKS Dąbrowa Górnicza =

MKS Dąbrowa Górnicza may refer to:

- MKS Dąbrowa Górnicza (basketball), professional basketball team
- MKS Dąbrowa Górnicza (volleyball), professional women's volleyball team
