= Tamara Kaliszuk =

Polish volleyball player (born 1990)

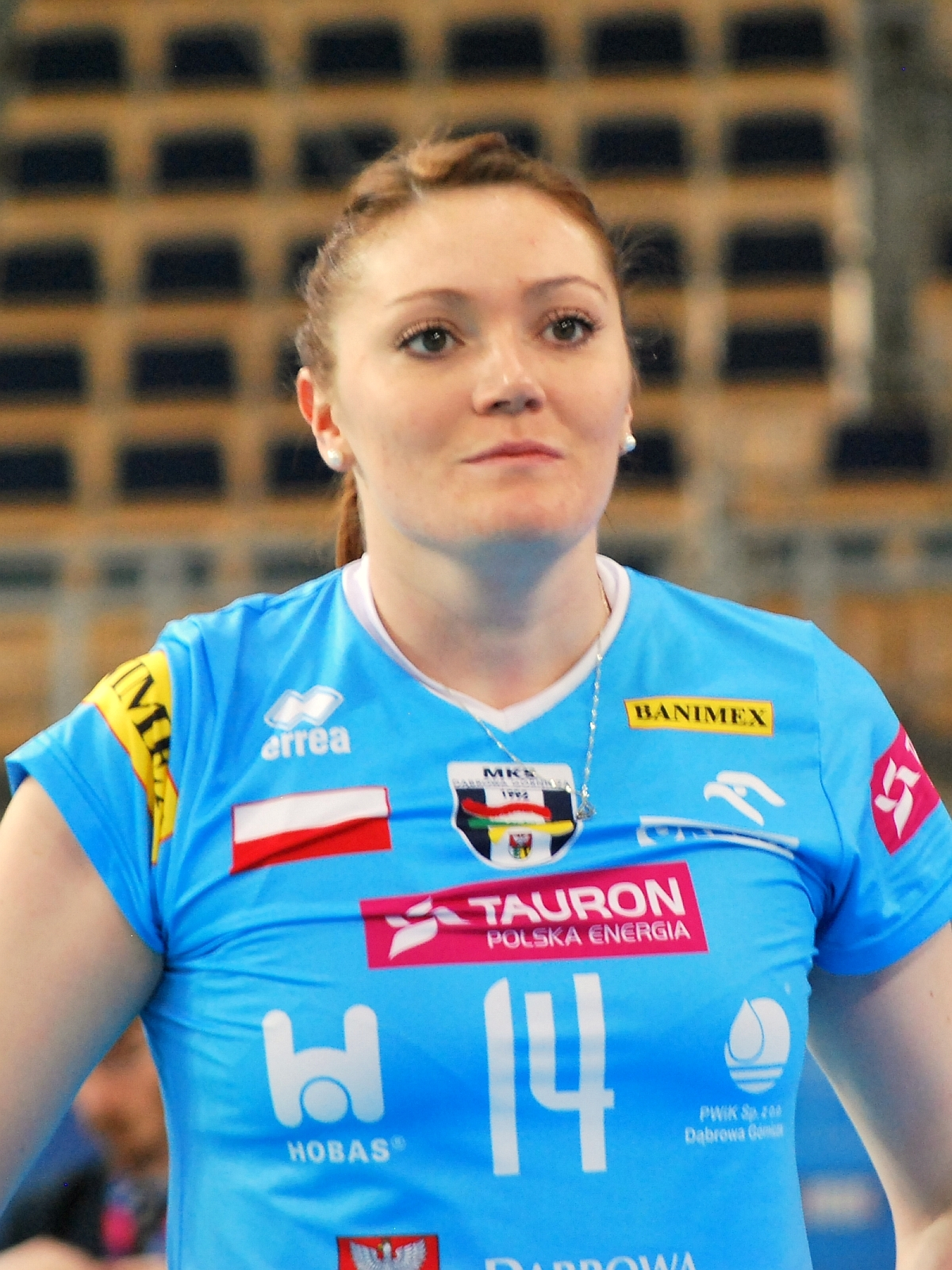
- Tamara Kaliszuk, 2014

Personal information
- Nationality: Poland
- Born: 20 March 1990 (age 36); Elbląg, Poland
- Height: 181 cm (71 in)
- Weight: 73 kg (161 lb)
- Spike: 296 cm (117 in)
- Block: 281 cm (111 in)

Volleyball information
- Position: Opposite
- Current club: MKS Dąbrowa Górnicza
- Number: 14 (club) 1 (national team)

Career
Years	Teams
2002–2006	Truso Elbląg
2006–2009	Gedania Gdańsk
2009–2010	Atom Trefl Sopot
2010–2011	PTPS Piła
2011–2012	KPS Chemik Police
2012–2013	Jedynka Aleksandrów Łódzki
2013–2014	Pałac Bydgoszcz
2014–	MKS Dąbrowa Górnicza

National team
2014–	Poland
- Last updated: 12 December 2016

Tamara Kaliszuk (born 20 March 1990) is a Polish female volleyball player. She is part of the Poland women's national volleyball team. On club level she played for MKS Dąbrowa Górnicza since 2014.

== Clubs ==
- (Poland) Truso Elbląg (2002–2006)
- (Poland) Gedania Gdańsk (2006–2009)
- (Poland) Atom Trefl Sopot (2009–2010)
- (Poland) PTPS Piła (2010–2011)
- (Poland) KPS Chemik Police (2011–2012)
- (Poland) Jedynka Aleksandrów Łódzki (2012–2013)
- (Poland) Pałac Bydgoszcz (2013–2014)
- (Poland) MKS Dąbrowa Górnicza (2014–present)
