= Dorota Świeniewicz =

Polish volleyball player (born 1972)

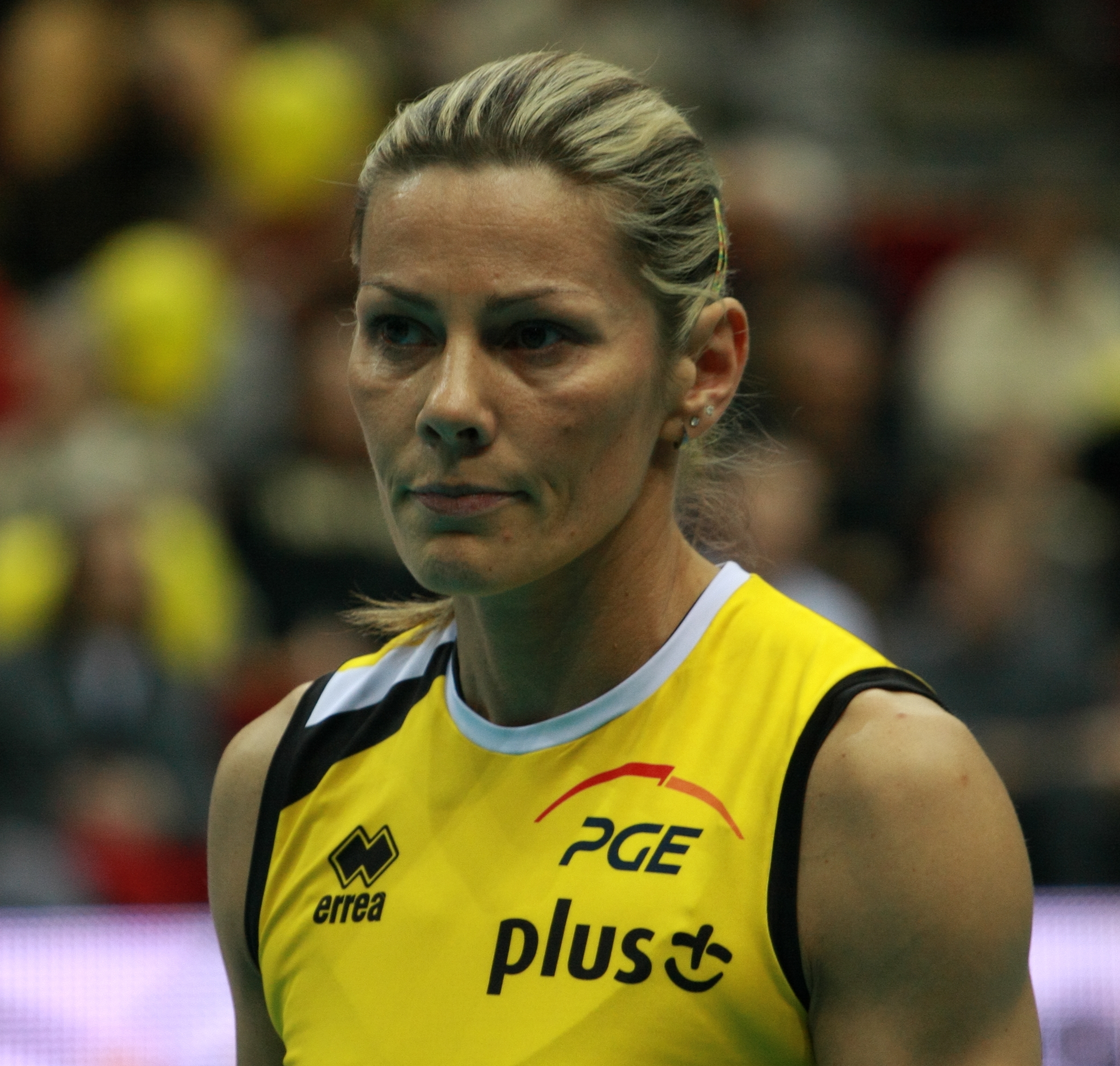

Personal information
- Full name: Dorota Świeniewicz
- Nickname: Dori
- Nationality: Polish
- Born: July 27, 1972 (age 54); Głuszyca, Poland
- Hometown: Świdnica, Poland
- Height: 1.80 m (5 ft 11 in)
- Weight: 65 kg (143 lb)
- Spike: 315 cm (124 in)
- Block: 305 cm (120 in)

Coaching information
Previous teams coached
Years	Teams
2012–2013; 2013	(Poland) PTPS Piła (II) (Poland) Sparta Warszawa (II)

Volleyball information
- Position: Outside hitter

Career
Years	Teams
1988–1993; 1993–1997; 1997–2006; 2007–2008; 2008–2009; 2009–2010; 2010–2012	(Poland) Polonia Świdnica (Poland) BKS Stal Bielsko-Biała (Italy) Pallavolo Sirio Perugia (Spain) Ícaro Palma (Italy) Santeramo Sport (Poland) BKS Stal Bielsko-Biała (Poland) Atom Trefl Sopot

National team
1991–2009	Poland (325)
Honours
Representing Poland
Women's volleyball
European Championship
Gold medal – first place	2003 Turkey
Gold medal – first place	2005 Croatia
- Last updated: 11 June 2015

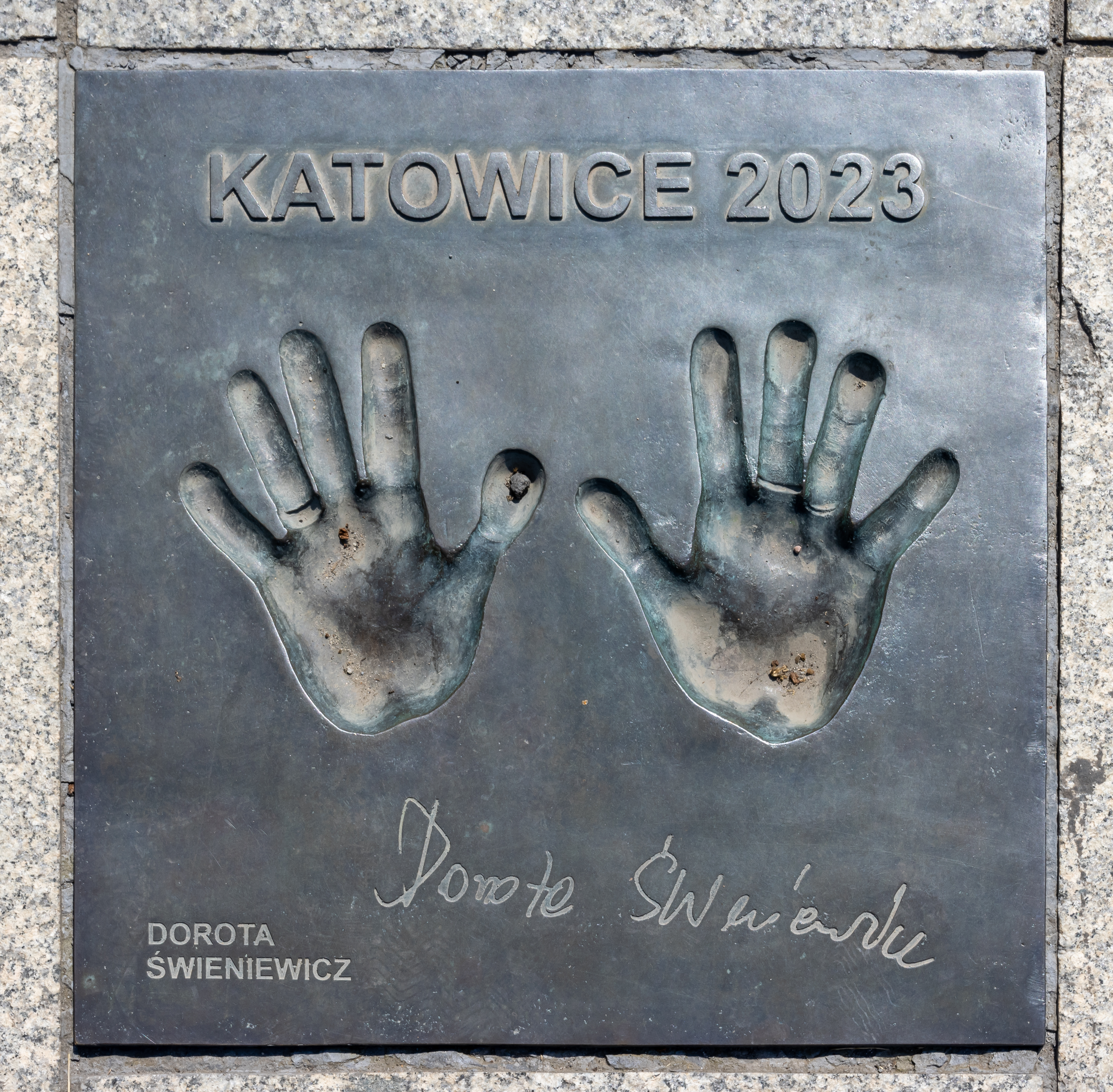
Hand prints and signature at the Avenue of Volleyball Stars, Katowice

Dorota Świeniewicz (born 27 July 1972) is a retired Polish volleyball player who was a member of Poland women's national volleyball team from 1991 to 2009. She was a double European Champion (2003, 2005), Polish Champion (1996, 2010), and Italian Champion (2003, 2005).

== Personal life ==
On March 1, 2007 she gave birth to son named Julian. Child's father is Marek Brandt - a former manager of Poland women's national volleyball team.

== Career ==
=== National team ===
On September 28, 2003 Poland women's national volleyball team, including Świeniewicz, beat Turkey (3–0) in final and won title of European Champion 2003. Two years later, Polish team with Świeniewicz in squad defended title and achieved second title of European Champion. She was Most Valuable Player of tournament.

== Sporting achievements ==
=== Clubs ===
==== CEV Champions League ====
- 2003/2004 - with Pallavolo Sirio Perugia
- 2005/2006 - with Pallavolo Sirio Perugia

==== CEV Cup ====
- 2004/2005 - with Pallavolo Sirio Perugia

==== National championships ====
- 1993/1994 Polish Championship, with BKS Stal Bielsko-Biała
- 1994/1995 Polish Championship, with BKS Stal Bielsko-Biała
- 1995/1996 Polish Championship, with BKS Stal Bielsko-Biała
- 1996/1997 Polish Championship, with BKS Stal Bielsko-Biała
- 1998/1999 Italian Cup, with Pallavolo Sirio Perugia
- 2002/2003 Italian Cup, with Pallavolo Sirio Perugia
- 2002/2003 Italian Championship, with Pallavolo Sirio Perugia
- 2004/2005 Italian Cup, with Pallavolo Sirio Perugia
- 2004/2005 Italian Championship, with Pallavolo Sirio Perugia
- 2007/2008 Spanish Championship, with Ícaro Palma
- 2009/2010 Polish Championship, with BKS Stal Bielsko-Biała
- 2010/2011 Polish Championship, with Atom Trefl Sopot

=== National team ===
- 2003 CEV European Championship
- 2005 CEV European Championship

=== Individually ===
- 2005 CEV European Championship - Most Valuable Player

=== State awards ===
- 2005 Knight's Cross of Polonia Restituta

Awards
Preceded by (Poland) Małgorzata Glinka	Most Valuable Player of CEV European Championship; 2005	Succeeded by (Italy) Taismary Agüero
