= Magdalena Śliwa =

Polish volleyball player (born 1969)

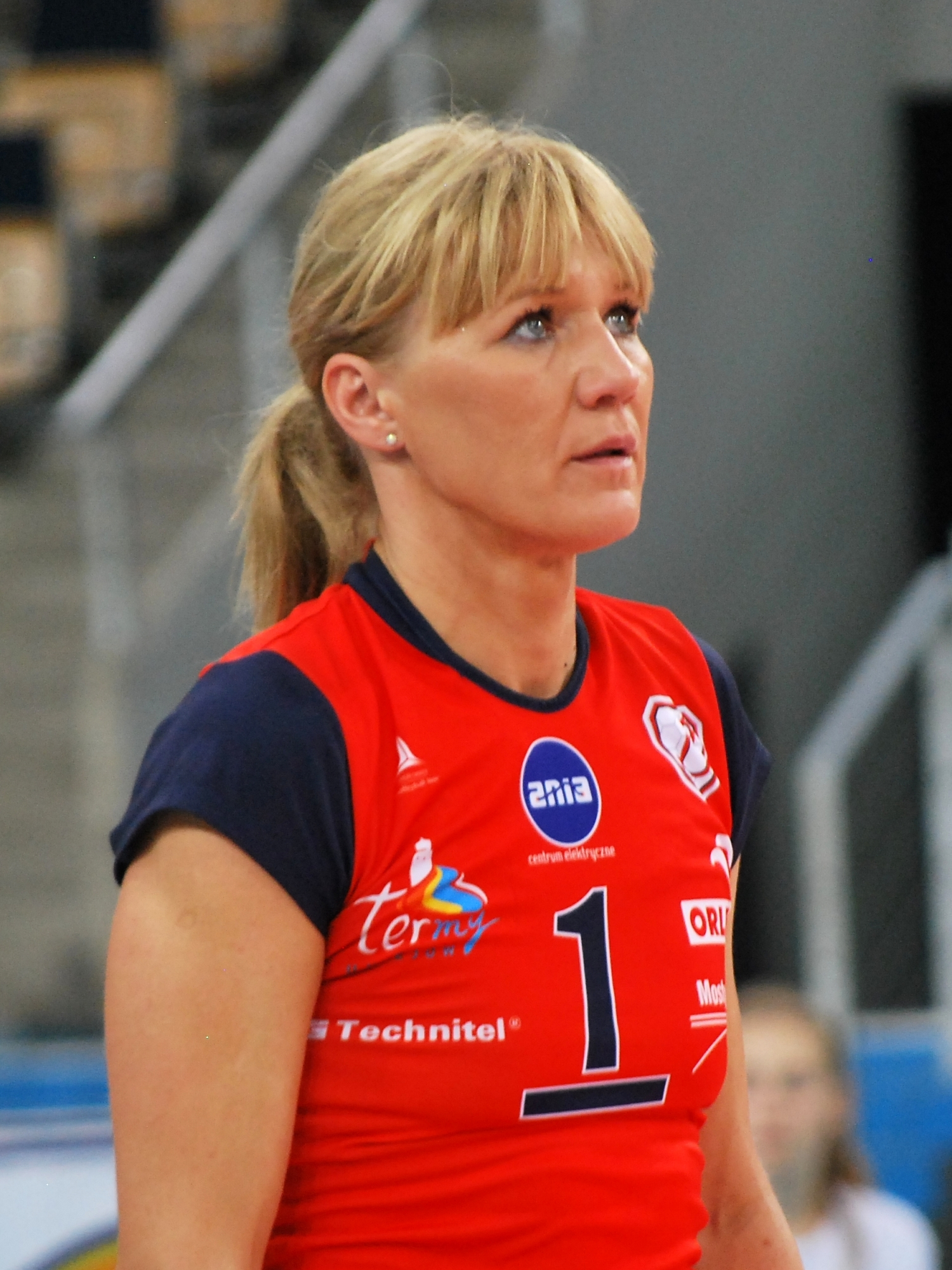

Personal information
- Full name: Magdalena Joanna Śliwa (nee Szryniawska)
- Nationality: Polish
- Born: November 17, 1969 (age 56); Maków Podhalański, Poland
- Height: 1.73 m (5 ft 8 in)
- Weight: 69 kg (152 lb)
- Spike: 290 cm (110 in)
- Block: 278 cm (109 in)

Coaching information
- Current team: (Poland) MKS Dąbrowa Górnicza (II)
Previous teams coached
Years	Teams
2015–	(Poland) MKS Dąbrowa Górnicza (II)

Volleyball information
- Position: Setter

Career
Years	Teams
1986–1990; 1991–1992; 1992–1996; 1996–1998; 1998–2001; 2001–2002; 2002–2003; 2003–2004; 2004–2006; 2006–2008; 2008–2010; 2010–2011; 2011–2013; 2013–2015	(Poland) Wisła Kraków (Poland) Wisła Kraków (Poland) KPS Chemik Police (Poland) BKS Stal Bielsko-Biała (Italy) Pallavolo Sirio Perugia (Italy) Foppapedretti Bergamo (Poland) BKS Stal Bielsko-Biała (Italy) Vini Monteschiavo Jesi (Italy) Vicenza Volley (Poland) Wisła Kraków (Poland) MKS Dąbrowa Górnicza (Poland) Atom Trefl Sopot (Poland) MKS Dąbrowa Górnicza (Poland) Budowlani Łódź

National team
1990–2007	Poland (359)
Honours
Representing Poland
Women's volleyball
European Championship
Gold medal – first place	2003 Turkey
Gold medal – first place	2005 Croatia
- Last updated: 12 June 2015

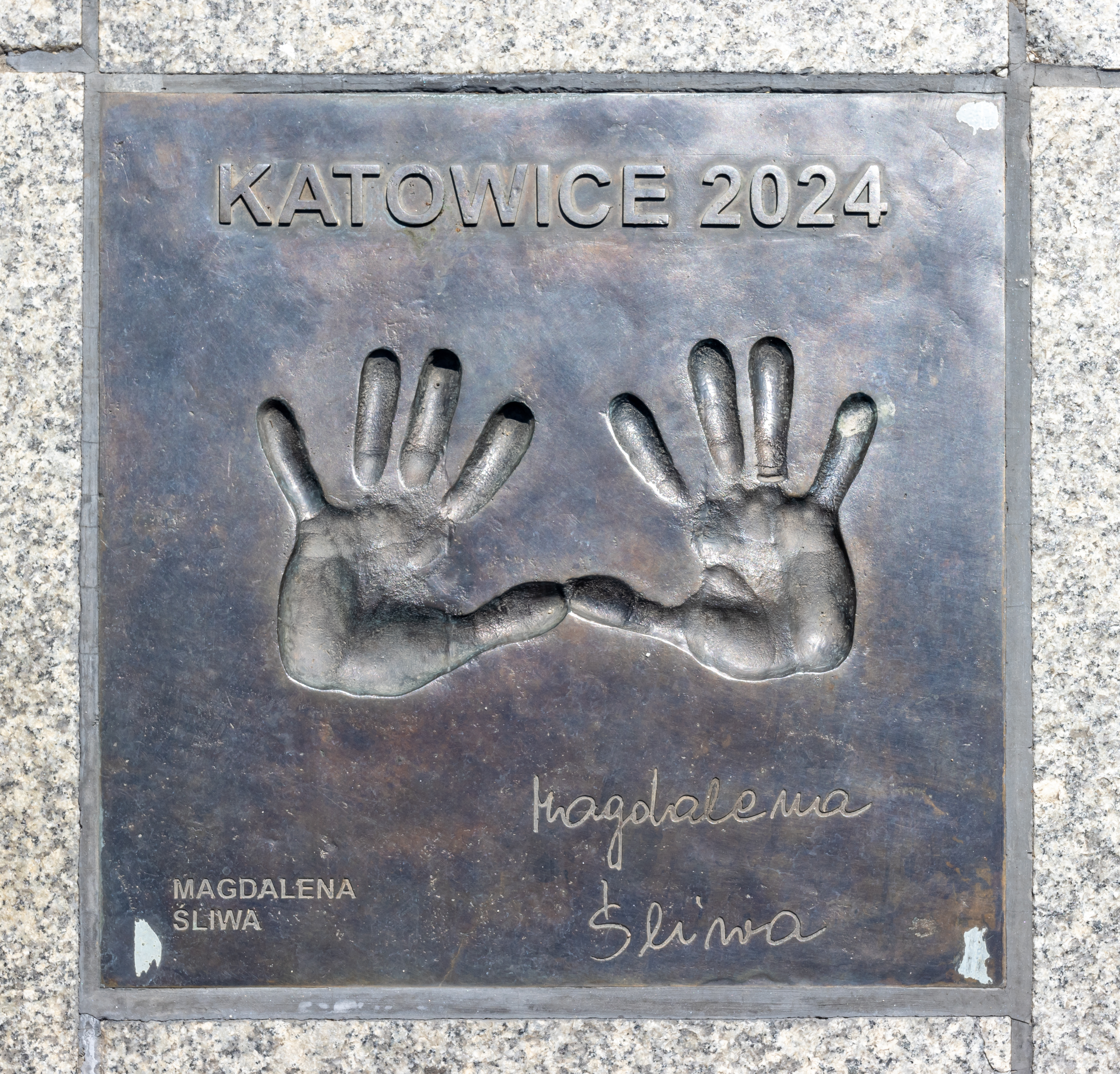
Hand prints and signature at the Avenue of Volleyball Stars, Katowice

Magdalena Joanna Śliwa (née Szryniawska; born 17 November 1969) is a Polish volleyball player, a member of Poland women's national volleyball team in 1990–2007, double European Champion (2003, 2005), three-time Polish Champion (1994, 1995, 2003), Italian Champion (2002).

== Personal life ==
She is married. On December 11, 1990, she gave birth to daughter Izabela, who is also volleyball player. Magdalena and her daughter played together in the same team - Atom Trefl Sopot in season 2010/2011.

== Career ==
=== National team ===
On September 28, 2003 Poland women's national volleyball team, including Śliwa, beat Turkey (3–0) in final and won title of European Champion 2003. Two years later, Polish team with Śliwa in squad defended title and achieved second title of European Champion.

She was an assistant to Marco Bonitta for the Poland women's national volleyball team.

== Sporting achievements ==
=== National team ===
- 2003 CEV European Championship
- 2005 CEV European Championship

=== State awards ===
- 2005 Knight's Cross of Polonia Restituta
