= Joanna Mirek =

Polish volleyball player (born 1977)

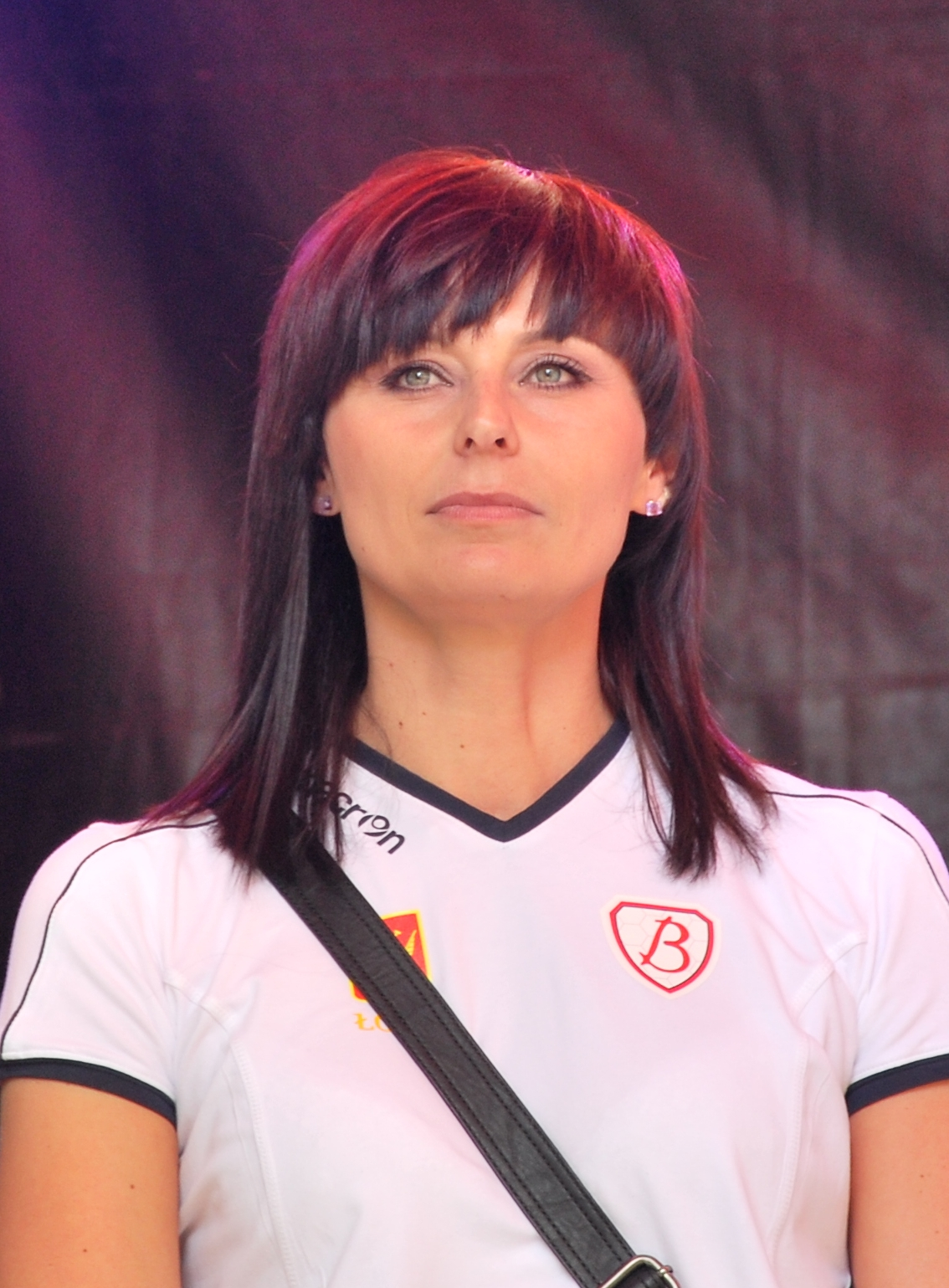

Personal information
- Full name: Joanna Mirek (née Podoba)
- Nationality: Polish
- Born: 17 February 1977 (age 49); Myślenice, Poland
- Height: 1.86 m (6 ft 1 in)
- Weight: 68 kg (150 lb)
- Spike: 316 cm (124 in)
- Block: 306 cm (120 in)

Volleyball information
- Position: Outside hitter
- Number: 10

Career
| Years | Teams |
|---|---|
| 1993–1997; 1997–1998; 1998–2000; 2000–2002; 2002; 2002–2004; 2004–2006; 2006–2007; 2007–2010; 2010–2012; 2012–2014 | (Poland) Dalin Myślenice (Poland) Wisła Kraków (Poland) Dick Black Andrychów (Poland) KPSK Stal Mielec (Poland) Nafta-Gaz Piła (Italy) Romanelli Volley (Poland) Nafta-Gaz Piła (Poland) Muszynianka Muszyna (Russia) VK Tulice (Poland) Muszynianka Muszyna (Poland) Budowlani Łódź (Poland) KPS Chemik Police |

National team
| 1996–2007 | Poland (234) |
Honours
Representing Poland
Women's volleyball
European Championship
| Gold medal – first place | 2003 Turkey |
| Gold medal – first place | 2005 Croatia |
- Last updated: 27 June 2014

Joanna Mirek (née Podoba) (born 17 February 1977) is a Polish volleyball player, a member of Poland women's national volleyball team in 1996–2007, double European Champion (2003, 2005), six-time Polish Champion (2001, 2002, 2006, 2008, 2009, 2014).

== Career ==
=== National team ===
On September 28, 2003 Poland women's national volleyball team, including Mirek, beat Turkey (3–0) in final and won title of European Champion 2003. Two years later, Polish team with Mirek in squad defended title and achieved second title of European Champion.

== Sporting achievements ==
=== National team ===
- 2003 CEV European Championship
- 2005 CEV European Championship

=== State awards ===
- 2005 Gold Cross of Merit
