= Gülden Kayalar Kuzubaşıoğlu =

Turkish volleyball player

Personal information
- Nationality: Turkish
- Born: Gülden Kayalar; December 5, 1980 (age 45) Samsun, Turkey
- Height: 1.68 m (5 ft 6 in)

Volleyball information
- Position: Libero
- Current club: Eczacıbaşı Zentiva
- Number: 2

Career
- Years: Team
- 2003-2012: Eczacıbaşı Zentiva

National team
- Years: Team
- –: Turkey
Medal record
Women's volleyball
Representing Turkey
FIVB World Grand Prix
Bronze medal – third place	2012 Ningbo	Team
European Championships
Silver medal – second place	2003 Ankara	Team
Women's European Volleyball League
Silver medal – second place	2009 Kayseri	Team
Mediterranean Games
Gold medal – first place	2005 Almeria	Team

Gülden Kayalar Kuzubaşıoğlu (née Kayalar, born 5 December 1980) is a Turkish volleyball player. She is 1.68 m (5 ft 6 in) tall and plays as libero. She plays for Eczacıbaşı Zentiva since 2003 and wears the number 2. She also played for Ankara Numunespor, Şanlıurfa Gençlikspor.

== Career ==
"I started playing volleyball in elementary school in Samsun at the age of eight", is how she describes the start of her career. Her first club team was Ladikspor. After Ladikspor she transferred to Samsun Atakum and DSI Spor before playing for the first division team Şanlıurfa Gençlikspor (2002–03). Then she signed a contract with Ankara Numunespor. At the beginning of the preparation phase for the European Championships, Gülden was chosen (out of a selection of many experienced libero players) as a candidate for the libero position in the national team. To her surprise, and to the amazement of many volleyball authorities, the national team coaches chose her to represent the Turkish colours in the European Championships 2002-03. Gülden tried her utmost to deserve this honor. "Being a part of the National Team means everything to me. I was very excited as I was just at the beginning of my career and was so afraid of not being successful. My team mates were very understanding and supportive. At the first national camp there were already two liberos and I did not expect to be chosen for the team. However, when they finally announced my selection, I was extremely excited'' she said.

During her first international appearance at the 23rd European Championships she demonstrated her defensive strengths, becoming a very effective weapon and the mascot of the national team of Turkey. At the end of the EC she was declared the best digger of the tournament. Although having lost the final to Poland, it has been Turkey’s biggest success in the history of the European Championships.

== Clubs ==
- (Turkey) Eczacıbaşı VitrA (2003–2011)

== Awards ==
=== Individuals ===
- 2003 European Championship "Best Digger"
- 2005 European Championship "Best Receiver"
- 2012 FIVB World Grand Prix "Best Receiver"
- 2012-13 Turkish League Final Series "Best Libero"

=== Clubs ===
- 2010-11 Turkish Cup - Champion, with Eczacıbaşı VitrA
- 2011 Turkish Volleyball Super Cup - Champion, with Eczacıbaşı VitrA
- 2011-12 Turkish Cup - Champion, with Eczacıbaşı VitrA
- 2011-12 Aroma Women's Volleyball League - Runner-Up, with Eczacıbaşı VitrA
- 2012 Turkish Volleyball Super Cup - Champion, with Eczacıbaşı VitrA
- 2012-2013 Turkish Women's Volleyball Cup - Runner-Up, with Eczacıbaşı VitrA
- 2012-2013 Turkish Women's Volleyball League - Runner-Up, with Eczacıbaşı VitrA
- 2016 FIVB Club World Championship - Champion, with Eczacıbaşı VitrA

=== National team ===
- 2003 European Championship - Silver Medal
- 2009 European League - Silver Medal
- 2012 FIVB World Grand Prix - Bronze Medal

Awards
Preceded by (Brazil) Fernanda Garay	Best Receiver of FIVB World Grand Prix; 2012	Succeeded by Not awarded
Preceded by (Romania) Nicoleta Tolisteanu	Best Receiver of European Championship; 2005	Succeeded by (Russia) Liubov Shashkova
