= Małgorzata Glinka-Mogentale =

Polish volleyball player (born 1978)

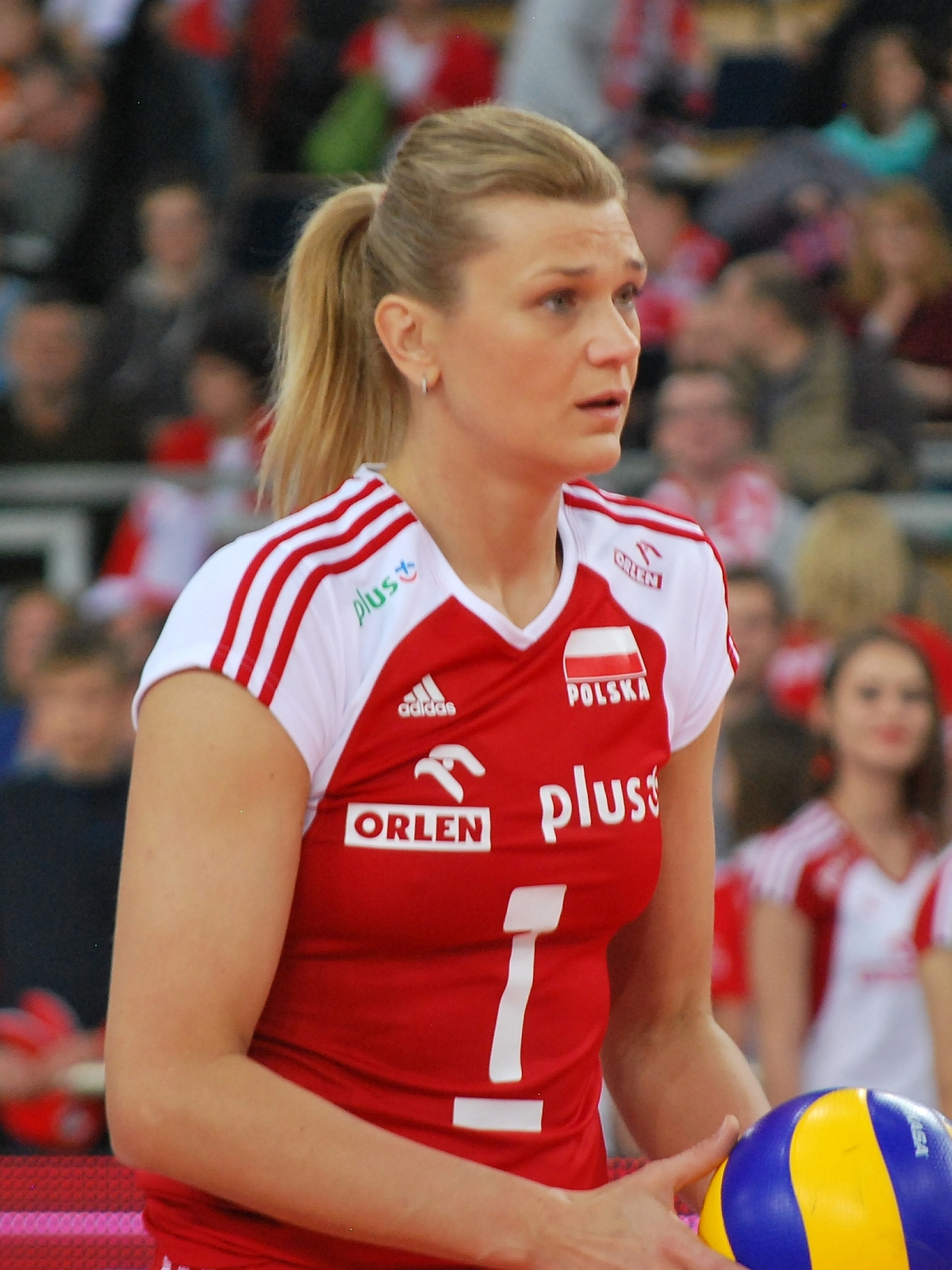

Personal information
- Full name: Małgorzata Glinka-Mogentale
- Nickname: Maggie
- Nationality: Polish
- Born: 30 September 1978 (age 48); Warsaw, Poland
- Height: 1.95 m (6 ft 5 in)
- Weight: 75 kg (165 lb)
- Spike: 315 cm (124 in)
- Block: 304 cm (120 in)

Volleyball information
- Position: Opposite/outside hitter

Career
Years	Teams
1993–1996; 1996–1998; 1998–1999; 1999–2003; 2003–2005; 2005–2006; 2006–2008; 2010–2013; 2013–2015	Skra Warszawa; MKS Andrychów; Augusto Kalisz; Minetti Vicenza; Asystel Novara; RC Cannes; CAV Murcia 2005; Vakıfbank Istanbul; KPS Chemik Police

National team
1997–2014	Poland
Honours
Women's volleyball
Representing Poland
European Championship
Gold medal – first place	2003 Turkey
Gold medal – first place	2005 Croatia
Bronze medal – third place	2009 Poland
- Last updated: 23 February 2017

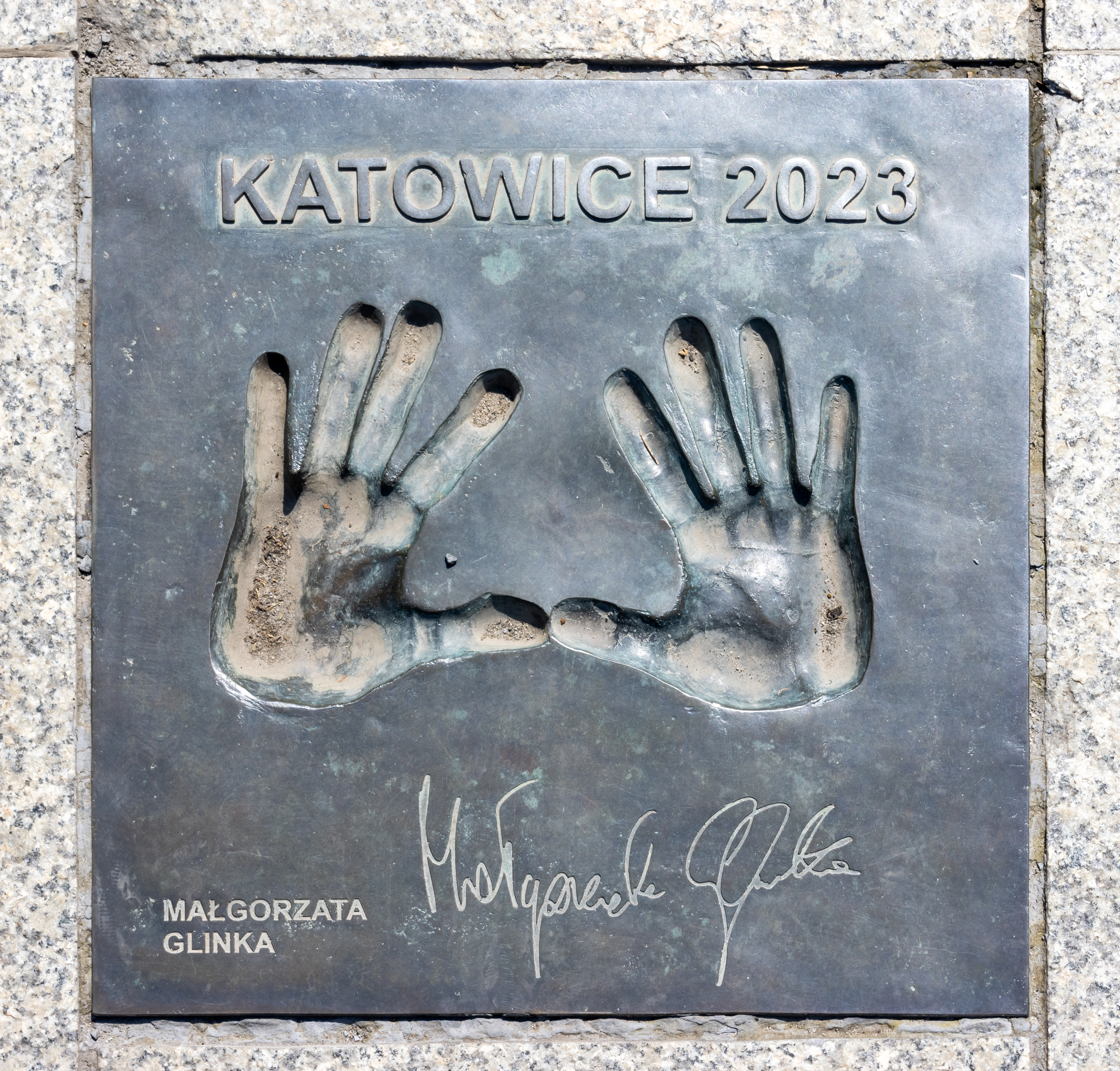
Hand prints and signature at the Avenue of Volleyball Stars, Katowice

Małgorzata Glinka-Mogentale (born 30 September 1978) is a Polish retired volleyball player. She was a member of Poland women's national volleyball team in 1997–2014, a participant of the Olympic Games Beijing 2008, double European Champion (2003, 2005), and a gold medalist of Polish, French, Spanish and Turkish national championships.

== Personal life ==
Glinka was born in Warsaw, Poland. She has an older sister, Dorota. On 24 June 2004 she married former Italian volleyball player, Roberto Mogentale in Wadowice. In July 2009 she gave birth to their daughter Michelle.

== Career ==
=== Clubs ===
The 195cm (6ft 5in) tall Glinka won the 2010–11 CEV Champions League with Vakıfbank Istanbul and she gained an individual award for the Most Valuable Player.

=== National team ===
Glinka was awarded Best Scorer and Most Valuable Player of the World Cup 2003.

On 28 September 2003 Poland women's national volleyball team, including Glinka, beat Turkey (3–0) in the final and won the title of European Champion 2003. She was also Best Scorer and Most Valuable Player of the tournament.

Two years later, the Polish team, with Glinka in the squad, defended the title and achieved the second title of European Champion.

In October 2009 she won with herteam mates the bronze medal of the European Championship 2009 after winning a match against Germany.

She participated with the national team at the Olympic Games 2008 held in Beijing, China.

== Records ==
- Glinka scored 41 points in a match between Poland and Germany (European Championships 2003 – semifinal).
- In the 2012–2013 Season, Vakıfbank İstanbul won all 47 games and reached three championship trophies (Turkish Cup, CEV Champions League, Turkish League). The Turkish team never lost in the 2012–13 season.

== Sporting achievements ==
=== Clubs ===
==== CEV Champions League ====
- 2004/2005 – with Asystel Novara
- 2005/2006 – with RC Cannes
- 2010/2011 – with Vakıfbank Istanbul
- 2012/2013 – with Vakıfbank Istanbul

==== CEV Cup ====
- 1999/2000 – with Minetti Vicenza
- 2000/2001 – with Minetti Vicenza
- 2006/2007 – with CAV Murcia 2005

==== FIVB Club World Championship ====
- Qatar 2011 – with Vakıfbank Istanbul

==== National championships ====
- 1993/1994 Polish Championship U18, with Skra Warszawa
- 1994/1995 Polish Championship U20, with Skra Warszawa
- 1995/1996 Polish Championship U20, with Skra Warszawa
- 1996/1997 Polish Cup, with MKS Andrychów
- 1996/1997 Polish Championship, with MKS Andrychów
- 1997/1998 Polish Championship, with MKS Andrychów
- 1998/1999 Polish Cup, with Augusto Kalisz
- 1998/1999 Polish Championship, with Augusto Kalisz
- 2000/2001 Italian Cup, with Minetti Vicenza
- 2000/2001 Italian SuperCup, with Minetti Vicenza
- 2003/2004 Italian Cup, with Asystel Novara
- 2003/2004 Italian Championship, with Asystel Novara
- 2005/2006 French Cup, with RC Cannes
- 2005/2006 French Championship, with RC Cannes
- 2006/2007 Spanish SuperCup 2006, with CAV Murcia 2005
- 2006/2007 Spanish Cup, with CAV Murcia 2005
- 2006/2007 Spanish Championship, with CAV Murcia 2005
- 2007/2008 Spanish SuperCup 2007, with CAV Murcia 2005
- 2007/2008 Spanish Cup, with CAV Murcia 2005
- 2007/2008 Spanish Championship, with CAV Murcia 2005
- 2010/2011 Turkish Championship, with Vakıfbank Istanbul
- 2011/2012 Turkish Championship, with Vakıfbank Istanbul
- 2012/2013 Turkish Cup, with Vakıfbank Istanbul
- 2012/2013 Turkish Championship, with Vakıfbank Istanbul
- 2013/2014 Polish Cup, with Chemik Police
- 2013/2014 Polish Championship, with Chemik Police
- 2014/2015 Polish SuperCup 2014, with Chemik Police
- 2014/2015 Polish Championship, with Chemik Police

=== National team ===
- 1996 CEV U20 European Championship
- 2003 CEV European Championship
- 2005 CEV European Championship

=== Individually ===
- 1997 FIVB U20 World Championship – Best Spiker
- 2001 CEV Cup – Most Valuable Player
- 2003 CEV European Championship – Best Scorer
- 2003 CEV European Championship – Most Valuable Player
- 2003 FIVB World Cup – Best Scorer
- 2003 FIVB World Cup – Most Valuable Player
- 2004 Italian Cup – Most Valuable Player
- 2006 French League – Most Valuable Player
- 2007 Spanish League – Most Valuable Player
- 2007 CEV European Championship – Best Spiker
- 2007 Spanish Super Cup – Most Valuable Player
- 2008 FIVB World Olympic Qualification Tournament – Best Spiker
- 2011 CEV Champions League - Most Valuable Player
- 2011 Turkish League – Best Scorer
- 2012 Turkish League – Best Scorer
- 2012 Turkish League – Best Spiker
- 2012 Turkish League – Best Server
- 2013 CEV Lifetime Award
- 2014 Polish SuperCup – Most Valuable Player

=== State awards ===
- 2005 Knight's Cross of Polonia Restituta

Awards
Preceded by (Bulgaria) Antonina Zetova	Best Scorer of CEV European Championship; 2003	Succeeded by -
Preceded by -	Most Valuable Player of CEV European Championship; 2003	Succeeded by (Poland) Dorota Świeniewicz
Preceded by (Croatia) Barbara Jelić	Best Scorer of FIVB World Cup; 2003	Succeeded by (Poland) Katarzyna Skowrońska-Dolata
Preceded by (Cuba) Taismary Agüero	Most Valuable Player of FIVB World Cup; 2003	Succeeded by (Italy) Simona Gioli
