= Maria Liktoras =

Polish volleyball player (born 1975)

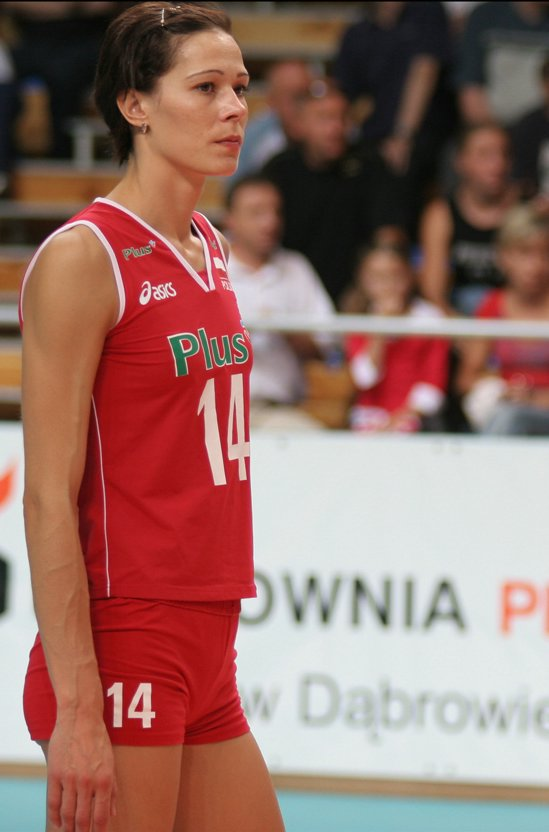

Personal information
- Full name: Maria Liktoras
- Nationality: Polish; Ukrainian
- Born: 20 February 1975 (age 51); Mineralnye Vody, Soviet Union
- Height: 1.91 m (6 ft 3 in)
- Weight: 73 kg (161 lb)
- Spike: 320 cm (130 in)
- Block: 307 cm (121 in)

Volleyball information
- Position: Middle blocker
- Number: 14

Career
Years	Teams
1997–1998; 1998–2003; 2003–2006; 2006–2007; 2007–2008	(Ukraine) Dynamo Jenestra Odesa (Poland) KPS Chemik Police (Poland) Nafta-Gaz Piła (Poland) Winiary Kalisz (Russia) Balakovskaia AES Balakovo (Russia) VC Dynamo Moscow

National team
2003–2008	Poland (173)
Honours
Representing Poland
Women's volleyball
European Championship
Gold medal – first place	2003 Ankara
- Last updated: 12 June 2015

Maria Liktoras (born 20 February 1975) is a former female Polish volleyball player, a member of Poland women's national volleyball team in 2003–2008, a participant of the Olympic Games Beijing 2008, European Champion 2003, five-time Polish Champion (1999, 2000, 2001, 2002, 2005).

== Personal life ==
She was born in Mineralnye Vody and grew up in Odesa. In April 2009 she gave birth to a son.

== Career ==
=== National team ===
On 28 September 2003 Poland women's national volleyball team, including Liktoras, beat Turkey (3–0) in final and won title of European Champion 2003.

== Sporting achievements ==
=== National team ===
- 2003 CEV European Championship
