= MKS Dąbrowa Górnicza (volleyball) =

Tauron MKS Dąbrowa Górnicza
- Full name: Miejski Klub Siatkarski Dąbrowa Górnicza Spółka Akcyjna
- Nickname: Dąbrowianki
- Founded: 1992
- Ground: Hala Sports Centrum, Dąbrowa Górnicza, Poland (Capacity: 3,000)
- Chairman: Robert Koćma
- Head coach: Magdalena Śliwa
- League: Orlen Liga
- 2016–17: 5th
- Website: Club home page

Uniforms
Home	Away

MKS Dąbrowa Górnicza, is the women's volleyball department of Polish sports club MKS Dąbrowa Górnicza based in Dąbrowa Górnicza and plays in the Orlen Liga.

== Previous names ==
Due to sponsorship, the club have competed under the following names:

- Miejski Międzyszkolny Klub Sportowy (MMKS) Dąbrowa Górnicza (1992–2007)
- MKS Dąbrowa Górnicza (2007–2009)
- Enion Energia MKS Dąbrowa Górnicza (2009–2010)
- Tauron MKS Dąbrowa Górnicza (2010–2013)
- Tauron Banimex MKS Dąbrowa Górnicza (2013–2015)
- Tauron MKS Dąbrowa Górnicza (2015–present)

== History ==
MKS Dąbrowa Górnicza (originally named Miejski Międzyszkolny Klub Sportowy (MMKS) Dąbrowa Górnicza) a sports club was founded in 1992 with various sports departments, including volleyball. It started competing with youth teams in regional leagues and due to the popularity of the sport amongst the secondary schools in the town, the club developed quickly and progressed through the lower national leagues until it reached the highest league in 2007. The club was renamed Miejski Klub Sportowy (MKS) Dąbrowa Górnicza and have won the Polish Cup twice (2011–12, 2012–13) and the Polish Super Cup twice (2012, 2013). The club has also often featured in European competitions since its first appearance in 2009.

== Honours ==
=== National competitions ===
- Polish Cup: 2

2011–12, 2012–13

- Polish Super Cup: 2

2012, 2013

== Team ==
Season 2016–2017, as of February 2017.

- Head Coach : (Argentina) Juan Manuel Serramalera (until February 2017), (Poland) Magdalena Śliwa (from February 2017)

Number	Player	Position	Height (m)	Weight (kg)	Birth date
1	(Cuba) Noris Cabrera	Outside hitter	1.83	75	25 October 1986 (age 38)
2	(Czech Republic) Helena Horka	Opposite	1.90	73	15 June 1981 (age 44)
3	(United States) Regan Elizabeth Hood	Outside hitter	1.88	74	10 August 1983 (age 42)
6	(Poland) Eleonora Dziękiewicz	Middle blocker	1.85	78	25 October 1978 (age 46)
7	(Poland) Anna Barbara Miros	Opposite	1.96	79	30 October 1985 (age 39)
8	(Poland) Daria Paszek	Outside hitter	1.86	74	30 August 1991 (age 34)
10	(Poland) Marta Ciesiulewicz	Outside hitter	1.83	68	6 March 1995 (age 30)
11	(Poland) Izabela Lemańczyk	Libero	1.69	61	11 December 1990 (age 34)
12	(Germany) Kathleen Weiß	Setter	1.72	63	2 February 1984 (age 41)
13	(Poland) Kamila Ganszczyk	Middle blocker	1.91	75	2 December 1991 (age 33)
14	(Poland) Tamara Kaliszuk	Outside hitter	1.82	75	20 March 1990 (age 35)
15	(Belgium) Dominika Sobolska	Middle blocker	1.87	78	3 December 1991 (age 33)
16	(Poland) Kinga Drabek	Libero	1.69	57	10 May 1998 (age 27)
18	(Argentina) Yael Castiglione	Setter	1.85	75	27 September 1985 (age 39)
19	(Poland) Aleksandra Sikorska	Middle blocker	1.85	67	28 April 1993 (age 32)

2013–2014 Team
Number	Player	Position	Height (m)	Weight (kg)	Birth date
1	(Poland) Katarzyna Urban	Outside hitter	1.82	68	30 October 1987 (age 37)
2	(Poland) Joanna Staniucha-Szczurek	Outside hitter	1.84	73	5 December 1981 (age 43)
3	(Poland) Aleksandra Liniarska	Middle blocker	1.88	76	12 December 1981 (age 43)
4	(Poland) Bożena Wylężek	Middle blocker	1.83	64	12 February 1996 (age 29)
5	(Italy) Natalia Guadalupe Brussa	Opposite	1.88	72	13 February 1985 (age 40)
6	(Poland) Eleonora Dziękiewicz	Middle blocker	1.85	78	25 October 1978 (age 46)
7	(Brazil) Wélissa Gonzaga	Outside hitter	1.78	76	9 September 1982 (age 43)
8	(Poland) Katarzyna Zaroślińska	Opposite	1.87	79	3 February 1987 (age 38)
9	(Turkey) Özge Çemberci	Setter	1.82	68	26 June 1985 (age 40)
10	(Poland) Krystyna Strasz	Libero	1.66	55	24 July 1987 (age 38)
11	(Poland) Anna Kaczmar	Setter	1.81	67	26 September 1985 (age 39)
13	(Croatia) Marina Katić	Setter	1.80	68	1 October 1983 (age 41)
14	(United States) Rachael Adams	Middle blocker	1.89	71	3 June 1990 (age 35)
16	(Poland) Elżbieta Skowrońska	Outside hitter	1.83	71	6 July 1983 (age 42)
