= 2005 Women's European Volleyball Championship =

2005 Women’s European Volleyball Championship

Tournament details
- Host country: Croatia
- Dates: 17 – 25 September
- Teams: 12
- Venue: 2 (in 2 host cities)

Final positions
- Champions: Poland (2nd title)

Tournament awards
- MVP: (Poland) Dorota Świeniewicz

The 2005 Women's European Volleyball Championship was the 24th edition of the event, organised by Europe's governing volleyball body, the Confédération Européenne de Volleyball. It was hosted in Pula and Zagreb, Croatia from 17 to 25 September 2005.

== Participating teams ==
Team	Method of qualification
Azerbaijan	Qualification Category A group 2 second
Bulgaria	Qualification Category A group 3 second
Croatia	Hosts
Germany	2003 edition third place
Italy	Qualification Category A group 2 winners
Netherlands	2003 edition fourth place
Poland	2003 edition first place
Romania	Qualification Category A group 1 second
Russia	Qualification Category A best third
Serbia and Montenegro	Qualification Category A group 3 winners
Spain	Qualification Category A group 1 winners
Turkey	2003 edition second place

== Format ==
The tournament was played in two different stages. In the first stage, the twelve participants were divided in two groups of six teams each. A single round-robin format was played within each group to determine the teams' group position. The second stage of the tournament consisted of two sets of semifinals to determine the tournament final ranking. The group stage firsts and seconds played the semifinals for 1st to 4th place, group stage thirds and fourths played the 5th to 8th place semifinals and the remaining four teams which finished group stages as fifth and sixth ended all tied in final ranking at 9th place. The pairing of the semifinals was made so teams played against the opposite group teams which finished in a different position (1st played against 2nd, 3rd played against 4th).

== Pools composition ==
Pool A	Pool B
Azerbaijan	Bulgaria
Croatia	Italy
Germany	Netherlands
Poland	Russia
Romania	Spain
Serbia and Montenegro	Turkey

== Venues ==
The tournament was played at two venues in two cities throughout Croatia. Each city hosted a group stage. Zagreb hosted the final round.

Pools A and Final round	Pool B	Host cities of the tournament
Zagreb	Pula	Host cities of the tournament
Dom Sportova	Sport Centre	Host cities of the tournament
Capacity: 5,000	Capacity: 2,400	Host cities of the tournament

== Preliminary round ==
- All times are Central European Summer Time (UTC+02:00).

=== Pool A ===
- venue: Dom Sportova, Zagreb

Pos	Team	Pld	W	L	Pts	SW	SL	SR	SPW	SPL	SPR	Qualification
1	Poland	5	5	0	10	15	4	3.750	456	391	1.166	1st–4th semifinals
2	Azerbaijan	5	4	1	9	12	5	2.400	413	371	1.113	1st–4th semifinals
3	Croatia	5	2	3	7	8	10	0.800	401	419	0.957	5th–8th semifinals
4	Serbia and Montenegro	5	2	3	7	9	12	0.750	456	454	1.004	5th–8th semifinals
5	Romania	5	1	4	6	7	13	0.538	405	469	0.864	
6	Germany	5	1	4	6	6	13	0.462	407	434	0.938	

Date	Time		Score		Set 1	Set 2	Set 3	Set 4	Set 5	Total	Report
17 Sep	15:30	Croatia	1–3	Romania	24–26	18–25	25–20	25–27		92–98	Report
17 Sep	18:00	Poland	3–0	Azerbaijan	26–24	25–20	25–23			76–67	Report
17 Sep	20:30	Germany	1–3	Serbia and Montenegro	22–25	25–17	13–25	16–25		76–92	Report
18 Sep	15:30	Azerbaijan	3–1	Romania	26–24	23–25	25–17	25–19		99–85	Report
18 Sep	18:00	Serbia and Montenegro	1–3	Croatia	25–16	19–25	23–25	16–25		83–91	Report
18 Sep	20:30	Poland	3–2	Germany	25–22	23–25	19–25	28–26	15–13	110–111	Report
19 Sep	15:30	Romania	2–3	Serbia and Montenegro	15–25	25–19	14–25	26–24	13–15	93–108	Report
19 Sep	18:00	Germany	0–3	Azerbaijan	24–26	14–25	21–25			59–76	Report
19 Sep	20:30	Croatia	1–3	Poland	16–25	21–25	25–22	20–25		82–97	Report
21 Sep	15:30	Azerbaijan	3–1	Serbia and Montenegro	18–25	25–19	25–20	28–26		96–90	Report
21 Sep	18:00	Poland	3–0	Romania	25–13	25–19	25–16			75–48	Report
21 Sep	20:30	Germany	0–3	Croatia	21–25	22–25	23–25			66–75	Report
22 Sep	15:30	Serbia and Montenegro	1–3	Poland	14–25	23–25	25–23	21–25		83–98	Report
22 Sep	18:00	Romania	1–3	Germany	25–20	18–25	21–25	17–25		81–95	Report
22 Sep	20:00	Croatia	0–3	Azerbaijan	23–25	16–25	22–25			61–75	Report

=== Pool B ===
- venue: Sport Centre, Pula

Pos	Team	Pld	W	L	Pts	SW	SL	SR	SPW	SPL	SPR	Qualification
1	Italy	5	5	0	10	15	3	5.000	429	366	1.172	1st–4th semifinals
2	Russia	5	4	1	9	14	6	2.333	447	411	1.088	1st–4th semifinals
3	Netherlands	5	2	3	7	11	10	1.100	473	467	1.013	5th–8th semifinals
4	Turkey	5	2	3	7	7	10	0.700	395	391	1.010	5th–8th semifinals
5	Bulgaria	5	2	3	7	7	11	0.636	374	406	0.921	
6	Spain	5	0	5	5	1	15	0.067	324	401	0.808	

Date	Time		Score		Set 1	Set 2	Set 3	Set 4	Set 5	Total	Report
17 Sep	15:30	Netherlands	2–3	Bulgaria	25–17	18–25	22–25	25–17	14–16	104–100	Report
17 Sep	18:00	Italy	3–0	Spain	25–21	29–27	25–21			79–69	Report
17 Sep	20:30	Turkey	0–3	Russia	23–25	24–26	20–25			67–76	Report
18 Sep	15:30	Bulgaria	0–3	Italy	23–25	14–25	20–25			57–75	Report
18 Sep	18:00	Russia	3–1	Spain	25–11	25–23	22–25	25–18		97–77	Report
18 Sep	20:30	Turkey	1–3	Netherlands	22–25	30–28	21–25	23–25		96–103	Report
19 Sep	15:30	Spain	0–3	Bulgaria	22–25	12–25	23–25			57–75	Report
19 Sep	18:00	Italy	3–0	Turkey	25–21	25–21	25–20			75–62	Report
19 Sep	20:30	Netherlands	2–3	Russia	25–18	25–21	20–25	26–28	9–15	105–107	Report
21 Sep	15:30	Turkey	3–0	Spain	25–22	25–13	25–21			75–56	Report
21 Sep	18:00	Netherlands	1–3	Italy	23–25	19–25	26–24	18–25		86–99	Report
21 Sep	20:30	Russia	3–0	Bulgaria	25–23	25–17	25–21			75–61	Report
22 Sep	15:30	Spain	0–3	Netherlands	23–25	20–25	22–25			65–75	Report
22 Sep	18:00	Italy	3–2	Russia	22–25	25–14	25–16	14–25	15–12	101–92	Report
22 Sep	20:30	Bulgaria	1–3	Turkey	25–20	14–25	19–25	23–25		81–95	Report

== Final round ==
- venue: Dom Sportova, Zagreb
- All times are Central European Summer Time (UTC+02:00).

=== 5th–8th place ===
- Pools A and B third and fourth positions play each other.

Semifinals
24 Sep
Croatia	1
Turkey	3
24 Sep
Serbia and Montenegro	0
Netherlands	3

5th place
25 Sep
Turkey	1
Netherlands	3
7th place
25 Sep
Croatia	0
Serbia and Montenegro	3

==== 5th–8th semifinals ====
Date	Time		Score		Set 1	Set 2	Set 3	Set 4	Set 5	Total	Report
24 Sep	12:00	Croatia	1–3	Turkey	25–18	22–25	23–25	22–25		92–93	Report
24 Sep	14:00	Serbia and Montenegro	0–3	Netherlands	15–25	11–25	21–25			47–75	Report

==== 7th place match ====
Date	Time		Score		Set 1	Set 2	Set 3	Set 4	Set 5	Total	Report
25 Sep	12:00	Croatia	0–3	Serbia and Montenegro	22–25	21–25	14–25			57–75	Report

==== 5th place match ====
Date	Time		Score		Set 1	Set 2	Set 3	Set 4	Set 5	Total	Report
25 Sep	14:00	Turkey	1–3	Netherlands	18–25	25–12	21–25	20–25		84–87	Report

=== Final ===
- Pools A and B first and second positions play each other.

Semifinals
24 Sep
Poland	3
Russia	2
24 Sep
Azerbaijan	0
Italy	3

Final
25 Sep
Poland	3
Italy	1
3rd place
25 Sep
Russia	3
Azerbaijan	0

==== Semifinals ====
Date	Time		Score		Set 1	Set 2	Set 3	Set 4	Set 5	Total	Report
24 Sep	16:30	Poland	3–2	Russia	26–24	25–22	26–28	20–25	22–20	119–119	Report
24 Sep	19:00	Azerbaijan	0–3	Italy	19–25	19–25	22–25			60–75	Report

==== 3rd place match ====
Date	Time		Score		Set 1	Set 2	Set 3	Set 4	Set 5	Total	Report
25 Sep	16:30	Russia	3–0	Azerbaijan	25–20	25–10	25–21			75–51	Report

==== Final ====
Date	Time		Score		Set 1	Set 2	Set 3	Set 4	Set 5	Total	Report
25 Sep	19:00	Poland	3–1	Italy	25–23	27–25	21–25	25–18		98–91	Report

== Final ranking ==
Place	Team
1st place, gold medalist(s)	Poland
2nd place, silver medalist(s)	Italy
3rd place, bronze medalist(s)	Russia
4	Azerbaijan
5	Netherlands
6	Turkey
7	Serbia and Montenegro
8	Croatia
9	Bulgaria
9	Romania
9	Germany
9	Spain

2005 Women's European champions

Poland
Second title

Team Roster:
Katarzyna Skowrońska, Mariola Zenik, Izabela Bełcik, Magdalena Śliwa, Małgorzata Glinka, Dorota Świeniewicz, Agata Mróz, Joanna Mirek, Sylwia Pycia, Natalia Bamber, Milena Rosner, Aleksandra Przybysz. Head coach: Andrzej Niemczyk

== Individual awards ==
Players awarded for their performances in the tournament.

- MVP: Dorota Świeniewicz (POL)
- Best scorer: Dorota Świeniewicz (POL)
- Best spiker: Elena Godina (RUS)
- Best server: Alla Hasanova (AZE)
- Best blocker: Özlem Özçelik (TUR)
- Best libero: Valeriya Korotenko (AZE)
- Best setter: Eleonora Lo Bianco (ITA)
- Best receiver: Gülden Kayalar (TUR)
