= Andrzej Niemczyk =

Polish volleyball player and coach (1944–2016)

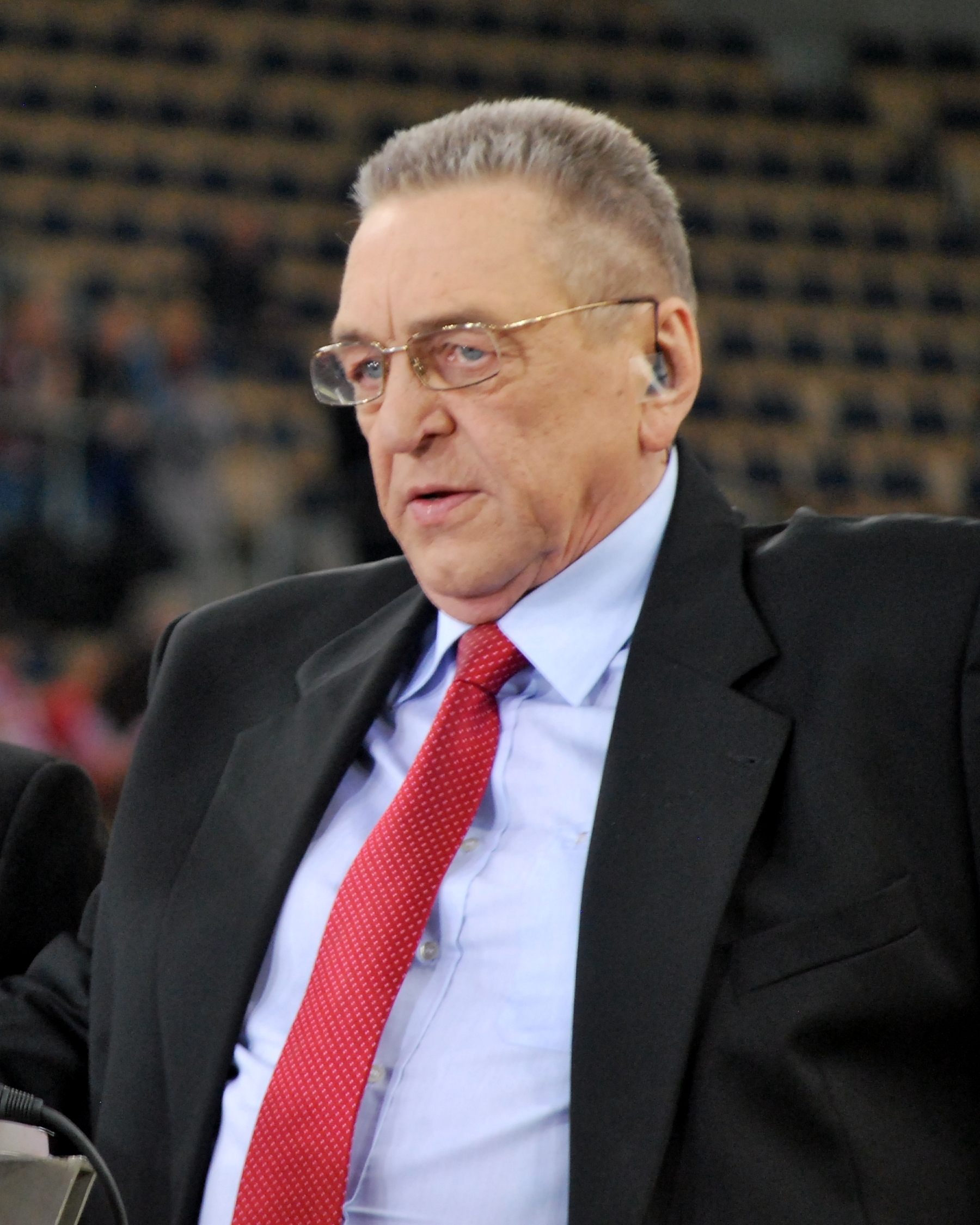

Personal information
- Full name: Andrzej Ryszard Niemczyk
- Nationality: (Poland) Polish
- Born: 16 January 1944; Łódź, Poland
- Died: June 2, 2016 (aged 72); Warsaw, Poland

Coaching information
Previous teams coached
Years	Teams
1975–1977; 1981–1993; 1981–1989; 1993–1996; 1996–1999; 2000–2001; 2003–2006	Poland (W); SV Lohhof; West Germany (W); SCC Berlin; VakıfBank Ankara; Eczacıbaşı; Poland (W)

Volleyball information
- Position: Setter
Honours
Women's volleyball
Head Coach Poland
CEV European Championship
Gold medal – first place	2003 Turkey
Gold medal – first place	2005 Croatia

Andrzej Ryszard Niemczyk (16 January 1944 – 2 June 2016) was a Polish volleyball player and coach.

He was the coach of the Poland women's national volleyball team that competed at the 2003 Women's European Volleyball Championship, and the 2005 Women's European Volleyball Championship.

Niemczyk was the true father of Kinga Maculewicz, according to her own statement and who has represented France, and father of Maculewicz's half-sisters Małgorzata, Saskia and Natascha. All of his daughters are also volleyball players.
