= 2003 Women's European Volleyball Championship =

2003 Women’s European Volleyball Championship
Tournament details
- Host country: Turkey
- Dates: 20 – 28 September
- Teams: 12
- Venues: 2 (in 2 host cities)

Final positions
- Champions: Poland (1st title)

Tournament awards
- MVP: (Poland) Małgorzata Glinka

The 2003 Women's European Volleyball Championship was the 23rd edition of the event, organised by Europe's governing volleyball body, the Confédération Européenne de Volleyball. It was hosted in Ankara, Turkey from 20 to 28 September 2003.

The two finalists Poland and Turkey claimed a ticket for the 2003 FIVB Women's World Cup and the first Olympic Qualification Tournament for the 2004 Summer Olympics held in Japan in November. The first six ranked teams (Poland, Turkey, Netherlands, Germany, Italy, and Russia) qualified for the European Olympic Qualification Tournament in Baku, from 5 to 10 January 2004. Semifinalists Turkey, Germany, Poland and the Netherlands also automatically qualified for the 2005 Women's European Championships, which took place in Croatia. Defending champion Russia finished out of the medals for the first time in volleyball history.

== Participating teams ==
Team	Method of qualification
Bulgaria	2001 edition third place
Czech Republic	Qualification Category A best third
Germany	Qualification Category A group 3 second
Italy	2001 edition second place
Netherlands	Qualification Category A group 2 second
Poland	Qualification Category A group 3 winners
Romania	Qualification Category A group 1 second
Russia	2001 edition first place
Serbia and Montenegro	Qualification Category A group 2 winners
Slovakia	Qualification Category A second best third
Turkey	Hosts
Ukraine	Qualification Category A group 1 winners

== Format ==
The tournament was played in two different stages. In the first stage, the twelve participants were divided in two groups of six teams each. A single round-robin format was played within each group to determine the teams' group position. The second stage of the tournament consisted of two sets of semifinals to determine the tournament final ranking. The group stage firsts and seconds played the semifinals for 1st to 4th place, group stage thirds and fourths played the 5th to 8th place semifinals and the remaining four teams which finished group stages as fifth and sixth ended all tied in final ranking at 9th place. The pairing of the semifinals was made so teams played against the opposite group teams which finished in a different position (1st played against 2nd, 3rd played against 4th).

== Pools composition ==
Pool A	Pool B
Germany	Bulgaria
Romania	Czech Republic
Russia	Italy
Serbia and Montenegro	Netherlands
Slovakia	Poland
Turkey	Ukraine

== Venues ==
Pool A and Final round	Pool B	Tournament host cities
Ankara	Antalya	Tournament host cities
Ankara Atatürk Sport Hall	Dilek Sabancı Sport Hall	Tournament host cities
Capacity: 6,000	Capacity: 2,500	Tournament host cities

== Preliminary round ==
- All times are Eastern European Summer Time (UTC+03:00).

=== Pool A ===
- venue location: Ankara Atatürk Sport Hall, Ankara, Turkey

Pos	Team	Pld	W	L	Pts	SW	SL	SR	SPW	SPL	SPR	Qualification
1	Germany	5	5	0	10	15	2	7.500	401	328	1.223	Semifinals
2	Turkey	5	4	1	9	14	3	4.667	393	342	1.149	Semifinals
3	Russia	5	3	2	8	9	7	1.286	378	342	1.105	5th–8th place
4	Romania	5	2	3	7	6	12	0.500	393	391	1.005	5th–8th place
5	Serbia and Montenegro	5	1	4	6	5	12	0.417	354	404	0.876	
6	Slovakia	5	0	5	5	2	15	0.133	310	422	0.735	

Date	Time		Score		Set 1	Set 2	Set 3	Set 4	Set 5	Total	Report
20 Sep	14:00	Germany	3–0	Slovakia	25–14	25–15	25–16			75–45	Report
20 Sep	16:30	Serbia and Montenegro	1–3	Russia	13–25	25–18	17–25	18–25		73–93	Report
20 Sep	19:00	Romania	0–3	Turkey	22–25	20–25	17–25			59–75	Report
21 Sep	14:00	Slovakia	0–3	Russia	25–27	17–25	19–25			61–77	Report
21 Sep	16:30	Germany	3–0	Romania	25–22	25–22	25–22			75–66	Report
21 Sep	19:00	Turkey	3–0	Serbia and Montenegro	25–23	25–20	25–20			75–63	Report
22 Sep	14:00	Romania	3–2	Slovakia	25–14	25–10	22–25	28–30	15–8	115–87	Report
22 Sep	16:30	Serbia and Montenegro	0–3	Germany	15–25	22–25	22–25			59–75	Report
22 Sep	19:00	Russia	0–3	Turkey	21–25	22–25	24–26			67–76	Report
24 Sep	14:00	Romania	3–1	Serbia and Montenegro	25–11	25–21	23–25	25–22		98–79	Report
24 Sep	16:30	Germany	3–0	Russia	25–22	27–25	25–19			77–66	Report
24 Sep	19:00	Slovakia	0–3	Turkey	20–25	20–25	14–25			54–75	Report
25 Sep	14:00	Russia	3–0	Romania	25–16	25–17	25–22			75–55	Report
25 Sep	16:30	Serbia and Montenegro	3–0	Slovakia	28–26	25–12	27–25			80–63	Report
25 Sep	19:00	Turkey	2–3	Germany	16–25	16–25	25–22	25–12	10–15	92–99	Report

=== Pool B ===
- venue location: Dilek Sabancı Sport Hall, Antalya, Turkey

Pos	Team	Pld	W	L	Pts	SW	SL	SR	SPW	SPL	SPR	Qualification
1	Netherlands	5	4	1	9	14	6	2.333	456	411	1.109	Semifinals
2	Poland	5	4	1	9	13	9	1.444	512	469	1.092	Semifinals
3	Italy	5	3	2	8	11	7	1.571	409	383	1.068	5th–8th place
4	Bulgaria	5	2	3	7	10	11	0.909	456	456	1.000	5th–8th place
5	Ukraine	5	2	3	7	7	12	0.583	405	426	0.951	
6	Czech Republic	5	0	5	5	5	15	0.333	367	460	0.798	

Date	Time		Score		Set 1	Set 2	Set 3	Set 4	Set 5	Total	Report
20 Sep	14:00	Poland	3–2	Netherlands	25–22	25–19	32–34	23–25	15–5	120–105	Report
20 Sep	16:30	Ukraine	3–1	Bulgaria	25–23	25–19	23–25	25–19		98–86	Report
20 Sep	19:00	Italy	3–0	Czech Republic	25–18	25–16	25–22			75–56	Report
21 Sep	14:00	Ukraine	1–3	Poland	19–25	25–23	19–25	23–25		86–98	Report
21 Sep	16:30	Bulgaria	3–0	Czech Republic	25–13	25–17	25–16			75–46	Report
21 Sep	19:00	Netherlands	3–0	Italy	25–20	25–19	25–18			75–57	Report
22 Sep	14:00	Poland	3–2	Bulgaria	25–17	25–22	22–25	20–25	15–12	107–101	Report
22 Sep	16:30	Czech Republic	2–3	Netherlands	14–25	25–18	17–25	25–20	10–15	91–103	Report
22 Sep	19:00	Italy	3–0	Ukraine	25–23	25–22	25–14			75–59	Report
24 Sep	14:00	Bulgaria	1–3	Netherlands	25–22	23–25	18–25	24–26		90–98	Report
24 Sep	16:30	Ukraine	3–2	Czech Republic	25–21	25–14	22–25	22–25	15–7	109–92	Report
24 Sep	19:00	Poland	1–3	Italy	25–20	22–25	20–25	22–25		89–95	Report
25 Sep	14:00	Netherlands	3–0	Ukraine	25–15	25–18	25–20			75–53	Report
25 Sep	16:30	Italy	2–3	Bulgaria	19–25	25–20	21–25	25–15	17–19	107–104	Report
25 Sep	19:00	Czech Republic	1–3	Poland	19–25	25–23	22–25	16–25		82–98	Report

== Final round ==
- venue location: Ankara Atatürk Sport Hall, Ankara, Turkey
- All times are Eastern European Summer Time (UTC+03:00).

=== 5th–8th place ===
- Pools A and B third and fourth positions play each other.

Semifinals
27 Sep
Russia	3
Bulgaria	2
27 Sep
Romania	1
Italy	3

5th place
28 Sep
Russia	3
Italy	0
7th place
28 Sep
Bulgaria	3
Romania	1

==== 5th–8th semifinals ====
Date	Time		Score		Set 1	Set 2	Set 3	Set 4	Set 5	Total	Report
27 Sep	11:30	Russia	3–2	Bulgaria	25–21	28–30	25–15	26–28	15–11	119–105	Report
27 Sep	14:00	Romania	1–3	Italy	25–21	15–25	26–28	21–25		87–99	Report

==== 7th place match ====
Date	Time		Score		Set 1	Set 2	Set 3	Set 4	Set 5	Total	Report
28 Sep	11:30	Bulgaria	3–1	Romania	25–21	20–25	25–20	25–22		95–88	Report

==== 5th place match ====
Date	Time		Score		Set 1	Set 2	Set 3	Set 4	Set 5	Total	Report
28 Sep	14:00	Russia	3–0	Italy	25–16	25–14	25–20			75–50	Report

=== Final ===
- Pools A and B first and second positions play each other.

Semifinals
27 Sep
Germany	2
Poland	3
27 Sep
Turkey	3
Netherlands	0

Final
28 Sep
Poland	3
Turkey	0
3rd place
28 Sep
Germany	3
Netherlands	2

==== Semifinals ====
Date	Time		Score		Set 1	Set 2	Set 3	Set 4	Set 5	Total	Report
27 Sep	16:30	Germany	2–3	Poland	23–25	25–20	25–22	22–25	9–15	104–107	Report
27 Sep	19:00	Turkey	3–0	Netherlands	25–17	25–22	25–22			75–61	Report

==== 3rd place match ====
Date	Time		Score		Set 1	Set 2	Set 3	Set 4	Set 5	Total	Report
28 Sep	16:30	Germany	3–2	Netherlands	25–20	25–15	24–26	23–25	18–16	115–102	Report

==== Final ====
Date	Time		Score		Set 1	Set 2	Set 3	Set 4	Set 5	Total	Report
28 Sep	19:00	Poland	3–0	Turkey	25–17	25–14	25–17			75–48	Report

== Final ranking ==
Place	Team
1st place, gold medalist(s)	Poland
2nd place, silver medalist(s)	Turkey
3rd place, bronze medalist(s)	Germany
4.	Netherlands
5.	Russia
6.	Italy
7.	Bulgaria
8.	Romania
9.	Ukraine
9.	Serbia and Montenegro
9.	Czech Republic
9.	Slovakia

2003 Women's European champions

Poland
First title

Team Roster
Izabela Bełcik, Małgorzata Glinka, Dominika Leśniewicz, Maria Liktoras, Agata Mróz, Małgorzata Niemczyk-Wolska, Anna Podolec, Aleksandra Przybysz, Katarzyna Skowrońska, Magdalena Śliwa, and Dorota Świeniewicz.
Head coach: Andrzej Niemczyk.

- Poland and Turkey qualified for the 2003 FIVB Women's World Cup

== Individual awards ==
Players awarded for their performances in the tournament.

- Best scorer: Małgorzata Glinka (POL)
- Best spiker: Elizaveta Tichtchenko (RUS)
- Best blocker: Kathy Radzuweit (GER)
- Best server: Elles Leferink (NED)
- Best digger: Gülden Kayalar (TUR)
- Best setter: Magdalena Śliwa (POL)
- Best receiver: Nicoleta Țolișteanu (ROM)
