= Gedania Gdańsk (volleyball) =

Polish women's volleyball club

Energa Gedania Gdańsk
- Founded: 1922
- Website: Club home page

Uniforms
Home	Away

Energa Gedania Gdańsk is a Polish women's volleyball club based in Gdańsk and won the Polish Championships in three occasions. Since the early 2010s only youth volleyball has become the club focus.

== Previous names ==
Due to sponsorship, the club have competed under the following names:

- Gedania Danzig (1922–1939)
- KKS Gedania Gdańsk (1945–2004)
- Energa Gedania Gdańsk (2004–2008)
- Gedania Żukowo (2008–2011)
- AWFiS Gedania Gdańsk (2011–2012)
- Energa Gedania Gdańsk (2012–2017)
- Gedania Gdańsk (2017–)

== History ==
The sports club Gedania Danzig was founded in 1922. The women's volleyball department was very successful during the early 1950s, winning Polish Championships in 1951, 1953, 1954 and was runner up in 1952. In the next three decades, the club spent more time in the second division and was relegated and promoted few times. It was only after promotion in 1987, that the club managed to play in the first division on a more regular basis, few promotions and relegations also occurred but this time the club spent more time in the first division. A second-place finish in the 1990–91 Championships ensured the club a place to play the 1991–92 CEV Cup. Following its last relegation from the first division in 2010, the club played in the I Liga in 2010–11 and due to financial issues made an agreement to swap places with AZS Politechnika Radom for the following season (moving to the II Liga, with AZS moving to I Liga).

Since it appeared in the II Liga of 2011–12, the club dissolved its senior team and have focused on its girls, youth and junior teams.

== Venue ==
From 2008 to 2011 the club played its home matches in the nearby town of Żukowo before moving to the Zespołu Szkół Energetycznych Hall in Gdańsk.

== Honours ==
Polish championships

- Winners: (2) 1953, 1954
- Runners-up: (2) 1952, 1991
