= BKS Stal Bielsko-Biała =

Polish football club

BKS Stal
- Full name: Bialski Klub Sportowy Stal
- Nickname: South Boys
- Founded: 1922; 104 years ago
- Ground: BBOSiR Stadium
- Capacity: 677
- Chairman: Zbigniew Garbacz
- Manager: Paweł Kozioł
- League: V liga Silesia II
- 2024–25: V liga Silesia II, 3rd of 16
- Website: https://bksstal.pl/strona-glowna
Home colours	Away colours

BKS Stal Bielsko-Biała is a Polish sports club, with two departments: the men's football team and the women's volleyball team. The club is based in Bielsko-Biała. The football team currently plays in the second group of V liga Silesia, the sixth level of competition.

== History ==
BKS Stal Bielsko-Biała (full name: Biała Sports Club Stal Bielsko-Biała) was founded in 1922 in Biała Krakowska, the town which in 1951 merged with Bielsko, to form Bielsko-Biała. The formation of BKS was connected with the rebirth of the Second Polish Republic: both Biała (located in former Austrian Galicia), and neighbouring Bielsko (which had belonged to the Duchy of Teschen) were the towns with large German communities. Local Poles wanted to create their own sports organization, as a counterbalance to the already existing German ones. BKS was based on the Sports Association Szczerbiec, formed in 1913. The hues of BKS were based on the colours of the city of Biała: red and green; in 1949 yellow was added. The club was under the patronage of several industries, most notably under the Bielsko Sewing Machine factory Befama (Bielska Fabryka Maszyn Włókienniczych "Befama"), under which the club expanded rapidly and later the FSM factory, which still exists today under a Fiat ownership.

== Football ==
From the very beginning, the officials of BKS were determined to form a football team. Apart from footballers, BKS had the departments of table tennis and gymnastics. In 1927, a stadium was built in Biała. To commemorate this occasion, an international football tournament took place, with teams from Czechoslovakia and Weimar Germany. In interwar Poland, the football team of BKS Bielsko played in local A Class, which was roughly the equivalent of the third level of Polish football system. BKS failed to win promotion to the top level of local football, the so-called Silesian League, or Silesian A-Class (see Lower Level Football Leagues in Interwar Poland).

In May 1945, following World War II, during which ethnic Poles were forbidden to officially play football games, BKS was recreated. In the early 1950s, BKS Stal, as it was called since 1949, gained a wealthy sponsor: the Textile Machine Factory Befama. Apart from Befama, other local factories also supported the club. In 1957, the stadium of BKS was renovated, and to mark the event, Stal tied 4–4 in a friendly game with Cracovia.

Until 1973, BKS Stal remained in the regional leagues, either 4th or 3rd level. In 1973, its football team won promotion to the Second Division. With a new, extremely wealthy sponsor (Fabryka Samochodow Malolitrazowych), Stal had a new manager, Antoni Piechniczek, who worked there in 1973–1975. In its first season, Stal was close to the promotion to the Ekstraklasa, finishing the year in the second spot, only behind GKS Tychy. In 1974, very talented goalkeeper Józef Młynarczyk joined BKS, to remain there until 1977. Stal remained in the Second Division for 5 years, to be relegated in mid-1978.

In 1981 Stal returned to the Second Division, and after one year, it was again close to the promotion to the Ekstraklasa, finishing the 1981/82 season as the second team, behind GKS Katowice. In 1982/1983, Stal was relegated. In 1980, Stal's U-19 team was Polish runner up, losing 0–2 to Polonia Bydgoszcz in the final game of the U-19 championship.

After the relegation of 1983, Stal so far has not returned to the Second Division. It was close in 1984, 1985 and 1987. In 1989, Stal was relegated to the fourth level, to return to the third level after one year. In the 1990s, Stal played either in the 3rd or 4th level, and in 2003, the team found itself in the 5th level. In the late 2000s Stal returned to the third level.

== Other sections ==
At the height of the clubs expansion, after the 1960s and 1950s, the club had 22 different sports departments. Only two remain to this day, and the declining economy and lack of money during the Polish Second Republic, as with many other Polish clubs at the time, meant that over the years the departments were shut down one by one. However, the weightlifting and hockey sections have produced several international athletes, such as weightlifting world record holder Antoni Pietruszek, and hockey national team player Wiktor Olszowski.

== Supporters and rivalries ==
BKS fans usually focus on football team due to the culture around the sport, however, they do sometimes support the women's volleyball team too for important games. The fans are usually nicknamed South Boys, and frequently highlight the fact they are the most southward major club in Poland. They have friendships with fans of Zagłębie Sosnowiec, Slavia Praha and Olimpia Elbląg, in the past they used to have a friendship with fans of Legia Warsaw. Their biggest rivals are fellow locals Podbeskidzie Bielsko-Biała with whom they contest the Bielsko-Biała Derby, however, they also have rivalries with most Upper Silesian teams.

== Honours ==
- II liga
  - Runners-up: 1973–74, 1981–82
- Polish Under-19 Championship
  - Runners-up: 1979–80

== See also ==
- BKS Bielsko-Biała - (Women's volleyball)
- Volleyball in Poland
- Football in Poland
- Sports in Poland
